= List of Polling divisions of Sri Lanka =

Polling divisions of Sri Lanka
- Electoral districts and polling divisions of Sri Lanka
- Category: Electoral districts
- Location: Sri Lanka
- Created by: 1978 Constitution
- Created: 7 September 1978
- Number: 160 (as of 2024)
- Government: Parliament of Sri Lanka

Polling divisions in Sri Lanka are subdivisions of the country's electoral districts. From the 1st parliamentary election in 1947 to the 8th in 1977, members were elected to the parliament using a first-past-the-post system from these polling divisions. This system changed in 1978.

The 1978 Constitution introduced a proportional representation electoral system, electing Members of Parliament from 22 multi-member electoral districts.

All but two electoral districts correspond to their respective administrative districts. The exceptions are Jaffna, covering both Jaffna District and Kilinochchi District, and Vanni, covering Mannar District, Mullaitivu District, and Vavuniya District. The first general election under this system was the 1989 election.

Polling divisions are still maintained for declaring election results, and for administrative purposes to facilitate the management and organisation of electoral processes.

== Electoral districts ==
Registered electors and seat allocation changes: 2020 to 2024
Provinces	Districts	Registered electors		Number of allocated seats		
Provinces	Districts	2020	2024	2020	2024	Change (+/-)
Western	Colombo	1,709,209	1,765,351	19	18	▼1
Western	Gampaha	1,785,964	1,881,129	18	19	▲1
Western	Kalutara	972,319	1,024,244	10	11	▲1
Central	Kandy	1,129,100	1,191,399	12	12	Steady
Central	Matale	407,569	429,991	5	5	Steady
Central	Nuwara Eliya	577,717	605,292	8	8	Steady
Southern	Galle	867,709	903,163	9	9	Steady
Southern	Matara	659,587	686,175	7	7	Steady
Southern	Hambantota	493,192	520,940	7	7	Steady
Northern	Jaffna	571,848	593,187	7	6	▼1
Northern	Vanni	287,024	306,081	6	6	Steady
Eastern	Batticaloa	409,808	449,686	5	5	Steady
Eastern	Ampara	513,979	555,432	7	7	Steady
Eastern	Trincomalee	288,868	315,925	4	4	Steady
North Western	Kurunegala	1,348,787	1,417,226	15	15	Steady
North Western	Puttalam	614,374	663,673	8	8	Steady
North Central	Anuradhapura	693,634	741,862	9	9	Steady
North Central	Polonnaruwa	331,109	351,302	5	5	Steady
Uva	Badulla	668,166	705,772	9	9	Steady
Uva	Monaragala	372,155	399,166	6	6	Steady
Sabaragamuwa	Ratnapura	877,582	923,736	11	11	Steady
Sabaragamuwa	Kegalle	684,189	709,622	9	9	Steady
National List	—N/a	—N/a	—N/a	29	29	Steady
Total	—N/a	16,263,885	17,140,354	225	225	Steady

== Polling divisions ==
=== Western Province ===
Electoral districts	Polling divisions				
Colombo	1. Colombo North	2. Colombo Central	3. Borella	4. Colombo East	5. Colombo West
Colombo	6. Dehiwala	7. Ratmalana	8. Kolonnawa	9. Kotte	10. Kaduwela
Colombo	11. Avissawella	12. Homagama	13. Maharagama	14. Kesbewa	15. Moratuwa
Gampaha	16. Wattala	17. Negombo	18. Katana	19. Divulapitiya	20. Mirigama
Gampaha	21. Minuwangoda	22. Attanagalla	23. Gampaha	24. Ja Ela	25. Mahara
Gampaha	26. Dompe	27. Biyagama	27. Biyagama	28. Kelaniya	—N/a
Kalutara	29. Panadura	30. Bandaragama	31. Horana	32. Bulathsinhala	33. Mathugama
Kalutara	34. Kalutara	35. Beruwala	36. Agalawatta	—N/a	—N/a

=== Central Province ===
Electoral districts	Polling divisions				
Kandy	37. Galagedara	38. Harispattuwa	39. Pathadumbara	40. Ududumbara	41. Teldeniya
Kandy	42. Kundasale	43. Hewaheta	44. Senkadagala	45. Mahanuwara	46. Yatinuwara
Kandy	47. Udunuwara	48. Gampola	49. Nawalapitiya	—N/a	—N/a
Matale	50. Dambulla	51. Laggala	52. Matale	53. Rattota	—N/a
Nuwara Eliya	54. Nuwara Eliya–Maskeliya	55. Kothmale	56. Hanguranketha	57. Walapane	—N/a

=== Southern Province ===
Electoral districts	Polling divisions				
Galle	58. Balapitiya	59. Ambalangoda	60. Karandeniya	61. Bentara–Elpitiya	62. Hiniduma
Galle	63. Baddegama	64. Ratgama	65. Galle	66. Akmeemana	67. Habaraduwa
Matara	68. Deniyaya	69. Hakmana	70. Akuressa	71. Kamburupitiya	72. Deniyaya
Matara	73. Matara	74. Weligama	—N/a	—N/a	—N/a
Hambantota	75. Mulkirigala	76. Beliatta	77. Tangalle	78. Thissamaharama	—N/a

=== Northern Province ===
Electoral districts	Polling divisions				
Jaffna	79. Kayts	80. Vaddukoddai	81. Kankesanthurai	82. Manipay	83. Kopay
Jaffna	84. Udupiddy	85. Point Pedro	86. Chavakachcheri	87. Nallur	88. Jaffna
Jaffna	89. Kilinochchi	—N/a	—N/a	—N/a	—N/a
Vanni	90. Mannar	91. Vavuniya	92. Mullaitivu	—N/a	—N/a

=== Eastern Province ===
Electoral districts	Polling divisions			
Batticaloa	93. Kalkudah	94. Batticaloa	95. Paddiruppu	—N/a
Ampara	96. Ampara	97. Sammanthurai	98. Kalmunai	99. Pothuvil
Trincomalee	100. Seruwila	101. Trincomalee	102. Mutur	—N/a

=== North Western Province ===
Electoral districts	Polling divisions				
Kurunegala	103. Galgamuwa	104. Nikaweratiya	105. Yapahuwa	106. Hiriyala	107. Wariyapola
Kurunegala	108. Panduwasnuwara	109. Bingiriya	110. Katugampola	111. Kuliyapitiya	112. Dambadeniya
Kurunegala	113. Polgahawela	114. Kurunegala	115. Mawathagama	116. Dodangaslanda	—N/a
Puttalam	117. Puttalam	118. Anamaduwa	119. Chilaw	120. Nattandiya	121. Wennappuwa

=== North Central Province ===
Electoral districts	Polling divisions				
Anuradhapura	122. Medawachchiya	123. Horowpothana	124. Anuradhapura East	125. Anuradhapura West	126. Kalawewa
Anuradhapura	127. Mihinthale	128. Kekirawa	—N/a	—N/a	—N/a
Polonnaruwa	129. Minneriya	130. Medirigiriya	131. Polonnaruwa	—N/a	—N/a

=== Uva Province ===
Electoral districts	Polling divisions				
Badulla	132. Mahiyanganaya	133. Viyaluwa	134. Passara	135. Badulla	136. Hali Ela
Badulla	137. Uva Paranagama	138. Welimada	139. Bandarawela	140. Haputale	—N/a
Moneragala	141. Bibile	142. Monaragala	143. Wellawaya	—N/a	—N/a

=== Sabaragamuwa Province ===
Electoral districts	Polling divisions				
Ratnapura	144. Eheliyagoda	145. Ratnapura	146. Pelmadulla	147. Balangoda	148. Rakwana
Ratnapura	149. Nivithigala	150. Kalawana	151. Kolonna	—N/a	—N/a
Kegalle	152. Dedigama	153. Galigamuwa	154. Kegalle	155. Rambukkana	156. Mawanella
Kegalle	157. Aranayaka	158. Yatiyanthota	159. Ruwanwella	160. Deraniyagala	—N/a
