= Mahara Polling Division =

Mahara
- Polling Division
- Coordinates: 7.023040°N 79.998235°E
- Country: Sri Lanka
- Province: Western Province, Sri Lanka
- Electoral District: Gampaha Electoral District

Area
  - Total: 103.66 km^{2} (40.02 sq mi)

Population (2012)
  - Total: 207,782
  - Density: 2,004/km^{2} (5,190/sq mi)
- ISO 3166 code: EC-02J

The Mahara Polling Division is a Polling Division in the Gampaha Electoral District, in the Western Province, Sri Lanka.

== Presidential Election Results ==
=== Summary ===
The winner of Mahara has matched the final country result 6 out of 8 times. Hence, Mahara is a Weak Bellwether for Presidential Elections.

Year	Mahara	Gampaha Electoral District	MAE %	Sri Lanka	MAE %
2019	SLPP	SLPP	4.70%	SLPP	11.66%
2015	UPFA	NDF	3.88%	NDF	5.51%
2010	UPFA	UPFA	4.11%	UPFA	7.42%
2005	UPFA	UPFA	4.64%	UPFA	8.91%
1999	PA	PA	2.23%	PA	7.24%
1994	PA	PA	2.24%	PA	4.48%
1988	SLFP	SLFP	3.20%	UNP	6.10%
1982	UNP	UNP	4.18%	UNP	5.99%
Matches/Mean MAE	6/8	7/8	3.65%	8/8	7.16%

=== 2019 Sri Lankan Presidential Election ===
Party	Mahara		Gampaha Electoral District		Sri Lanka	
Party	Votes	%	Votes	%	Votes	%
SLPP	83,989	64.43%	855,870	59.28%	6,924,255	52.25%
NDF	38,407	29.46%	494,671	34.26%	5,564,239	41.99%
NMPP	5,547	4.26%	61,760	4.28%	418,553	3.16%
Other Parties (with < 1%)	2,407	1.85%	31,499	2.18%	345,452	2.61%
Valid Votes	130,350	99.11%	1,443,800	98.92%	13,252,499	98.99%
Rejected Votes	1,166	0.89%	15,751	1.08%	135,452	1.01%
Total Polled	131,516	83.81%	1,459,551	83.31%	13,387,951	83.71%
Registered Electors	156,924		1,751,892		15,992,568	

=== 2015 Sri Lankan Presidential Election ===
Party	Mahara		Gampaha Electoral District		Sri Lanka	
Party	Votes	%	Votes	%	Votes	%
UPFA	64,314	53.43%	664,347	49.49%	5,768,090	47.58%
NDF	55,334	45.97%	669,007	49.83%	6,217,162	51.28%
Other Parties (with < 1%)	733	0.61%	9,142	0.68%	138,200	1.14%
Valid Votes	120,381	99.05%	1,342,496	98.92%	12,123,452	98.85%
Rejected Votes	1,154	0.95%	14,647	1.08%	140,925	1.15%
Total Polled	121,535	81.32%	1,357,143	80.77%	12,264,377	78.69%
Registered Electors	149,453		1,680,263		15,585,942	

=== 2010 Sri Lankan Presidential Election ===
Party	Mahara		Gampaha Electoral District		Sri Lanka	
Party	Votes	%	Votes	%	Votes	%
UPFA	69,085	65.85%	718,716	61.66%	6,015,934	57.88%
NDF	34,807	33.18%	434,506	37.28%	4,173,185	40.15%
Other Parties (with < 1%)	1,013	0.97%	12,426	1.07%	204,494	1.97%
Valid Votes	104,905	99.40%	1,165,648	99.24%	10,393,613	99.03%
Rejected Votes	629	0.60%	8,960	0.76%	101,838	0.97%
Total Polled	105,534	78.42%	1,174,608	78.03%	10,495,451	66.70%
Registered Electors	134,581		1,505,363		15,734,587	

=== 2005 Sri Lankan Presidential Election ===
Party	Mahara		Gampaha Electoral District		Sri Lanka	
Party	Votes	%	Votes	%	Votes	%
UPFA	56,759	59.51%	596,698	54.78%	4,887,152	50.29%
UNP	37,772	39.60%	481,764	44.23%	4,706,366	48.43%
Other Parties (with < 1%)	849	0.89%	10,815	0.99%	123,521	1.27%
Valid Votes	95,380	99.06%	1,089,277	98.94%	9,717,039	98.88%
Rejected Votes	901	0.94%	11,724	1.06%	109,869	1.12%
Total Polled	96,281	78.89%	1,101,001	79.17%	9,826,908	69.51%
Registered Electors	122,039		1,390,691		14,136,979	

=== 1999 Sri Lankan Presidential Election ===
Party	Mahara		Gampaha Electoral District		Sri Lanka	
Party	Votes	%	Votes	%	Votes	%
PA	46,703	58.69%	532,796	56.58%	4,312,157	51.12%
UNP	27,771	34.90%	353,969	37.59%	3,602,748	42.71%
JVP	3,941	4.95%	40,472	4.30%	343,927	4.08%
Other Parties (with < 1%)	1,159	1.46%	14,382	1.53%	176,679	2.09%
Valid Votes	79,574	97.78%	941,619	97.84%	8,435,754	97.69%
Rejected Votes	1,809	2.22%	20,768	2.16%	199,536	2.31%
Total Polled	81,383	75.56%	962,387	77.12%	8,635,290	72.17%
Registered Electors	107,701		1,247,860		11,965,536	

=== 1994 Sri Lankan Presidential Election ===
Party	Mahara		Gampaha Electoral District		Sri Lanka	
Party	Votes	%	Votes	%	Votes	%
PA	46,494	66.98%	550,654	64.74%	4,709,205	62.28%
UNP	21,935	31.60%	288,608	33.93%	2,715,283	35.91%
Other Parties (with < 1%)	985	1.42%	11,256	1.32%	137,040	1.81%
Valid Votes	69,414	98.49%	850,518	98.48%	7,561,526	98.03%
Rejected Votes	1,064	1.51%	13,137	1.52%	151,706	1.97%
Total Polled	70,478	71.85%	863,655	74.16%	7,713,232	69.12%
Registered Electors	98,091		1,164,625		11,158,880	

=== 1988 Sri Lankan Presidential Election ===
Party	Mahara		Gampaha Electoral District		Sri Lanka	
Party	Votes	%	Votes	%	Votes	%
SLFP	30,305	51.60%	355,553	48.83%	2,289,857	44.95%
UNP	26,024	44.31%	350,092	48.08%	2,569,199	50.43%
SLMP	2,407	4.10%	22,467	3.09%	235,701	4.63%
Valid Votes	58,736	98.76%	728,112	98.63%	5,094,754	98.24%
Rejected Votes	735	1.24%	10,108	1.37%	91,499	1.76%
Total Polled	59,471	74.40%	738,220	74.93%	5,186,256	55.87%
Registered Electors	79,936		985,206		9,283,143	

=== 1982 Sri Lankan Presidential Election ===
Party	Mahara		Gampaha Electoral District		Sri Lanka	
Party	Votes	%	Votes	%	Votes	%
UNP	25,853	48.07%	365,847	52.50%	3,450,815	52.93%
SLFP	25,580	47.57%	301,808	43.31%	2,546,348	39.05%
JVP	1,952	3.63%	23,701	3.40%	273,428	4.19%
Other Parties (with < 1%)	393	0.73%	5,491	0.79%	249,460	3.83%
Valid Votes	53,778	99.23%	696,847	99.15%	6,520,156	98.78%
Rejected Votes	418	0.77%	5,992	0.85%	80,470	1.22%
Total Polled	54,196	82.54%	702,839	82.70%	6,600,626	80.15%
Registered Electors	65,660		849,896		8,235,358	

== Parliamentary Election Results ==
=== Summary ===
The winner of Mahara has matched the final country result 5 out of 7 times. Hence, Mahara is a Weak Bellwether for Parliamentary Elections.

Year	Mahara	Gampaha Electoral District	MAE %	Sri Lanka	MAE %
2015	UPFA	UNP	4.83%	UNP	5.14%
2010	UPFA	UPFA	3.33%	UPFA	5.38%
2004	UPFA	UPFA	4.24%	UPFA	7.11%
2001	PA	UNP	1.91%	UNP	5.04%
2000	PA	PA	1.75%	PA	3.75%
1994	PA	PA	2.17%	PA	6.84%
1989	UNP	UNP	3.65%	UNP	4.44%
Matches/Mean MAE	5/7	7/7	3.13%	7/7	5.39%

=== 2015 Sri Lankan Parliamentary Election ===
Party	Mahara		Gampaha Electoral District		Sri Lanka	
Party	Votes	%	Votes	%	Votes	%
UPFA	54,362	49.70%	549,958	44.96%	4,732,664	42.48%
UNP	45,446	41.54%	577,004	47.17%	5,098,916	45.77%
JVP	8,603	7.86%	87,880	7.18%	544,154	4.88%
Other Parties (with < 1%)	979	0.89%	8,332	0.68%	81,501	0.73%
Valid Votes	109,390	95.86%	1,223,174	95.51%	11,140,333	95.35%
Rejected Votes	4,646	4.07%	56,246	4.39%	516,926	4.42%
Total Polled	114,112	76.35%	1,280,647	78.21%	11,684,111	77.66%
Registered Electors	149,453		1,637,537		15,044,490	

=== 2010 Sri Lankan Parliamentary Election ===
Party	Mahara		Gampaha Electoral District		Sri Lanka	
Party	Votes	%	Votes	%	Votes	%
UPFA	55,327	66.69%	589,476	63.40%	4,846,388	60.38%
UNP	20,387	24.57%	266,523	28.67%	2,357,057	29.37%
DNA	7,027	8.47%	69,747	7.50%	441,251	5.50%
Other Parties (with < 1%)	226	0.27%	3,985	0.43%	19,003	0.24%
Valid Votes	82,967	95.44%	929,731	94.83%	8,026,322	96.03%
Rejected Votes	3,925	4.52%	50,234	5.12%	581,465	6.96%
Total Polled	86,932	64.59%	980,467	65.06%	8,358,246	59.29%
Registered Electors	134,581		1,506,969		14,097,690	

=== 2004 Sri Lankan Parliamentary Election ===
Party	Mahara		Gampaha Electoral District		Sri Lanka	
Party	Votes	%	Votes	%	Votes	%
UPFA	47,558	54.98%	509,963	51.52%	4,223,126	45.70%
UNP	27,012	31.23%	367,572	37.14%	3,486,792	37.73%
JHU	11,194	12.94%	102,516	10.36%	552,723	5.98%
Other Parties (with < 1%)	734	0.85%	9,691	0.98%	57,229	0.62%
Valid Votes	86,498	96.15%	989,742	95.96%	9,241,931	94.52%
Rejected Votes	3,448	3.83%	41,462	4.02%	534,452	5.47%
Total Polled	89,962	76.35%	1,031,464	77.72%	9,777,821	75.74%
Registered Electors	117,826		1,327,145		12,909,631	

=== 2001 Sri Lankan Parliamentary Election ===
Party	Mahara		Gampaha Electoral District		Sri Lanka	
Party	Votes	%	Votes	%	Votes	%
PA	37,499	44.05%	428,780	43.08%	3,330,815	37.19%
UNP	34,904	41.00%	437,289	43.94%	4,086,026	45.62%
JVP	11,262	13.23%	113,990	11.45%	815,353	9.10%
Other Parties (with < 1%)	1,458	1.71%	15,171	1.52%	137,826	1.54%
Valid Votes	85,123	96.42%	995,230	96.30%	8,955,844	94.77%
Rejected Votes	3,158	3.58%	38,187	3.70%	494,009	5.23%
Total Polled	88,281	78.01%	1,033,417	80.36%	9,449,878	76.03%
Registered Electors	113,172		1,285,973		12,428,762	

=== 2000 Sri Lankan Parliamentary Election ===
Party	Mahara		Gampaha Electoral District		Sri Lanka	
Party	Votes	%	Votes	%	Votes	%
PA	40,884	50.17%	470,018	48.87%	3,899,329	45.33%
UNP	30,031	36.85%	378,328	39.34%	3,451,765	40.12%
JVP	7,489	9.19%	73,110	7.60%	518,725	6.03%
SU	1,983	2.43%	20,297	2.11%	127,859	1.49%
Other Parties (with < 1%)	1,098	1.35%	19,956	2.08%	319,123	3.71%
Valid Votes	81,485	N/A	961,709	N/A	8,602,617	N/A

=== 1994 Sri Lankan Parliamentary Election ===
Party	Mahara		Gampaha Electoral District		Sri Lanka	
Party	Votes	%	Votes	%	Votes	%
PA	43,413	58.88%	509,030	56.79%	3,887,805	48.94%
UNP	29,173	39.56%	375,631	41.91%	3,498,370	44.04%
SLPF	1,149	1.56%	11,627	1.30%	90,078	1.13%
Valid Votes	73,735	96.49%	896,288	96.39%	7,943,688	95.20%
Rejected Votes	2,685	3.51%	33,553	3.61%	400,395	4.80%
Total Polled	76,420	77.91%	929,841	79.65%	8,344,095	74.75%
Registered Electors	98,091		1,167,469		11,163,064	

=== 1989 Sri Lankan Parliamentary Election ===
Party	Mahara		Gampaha Electoral District		Sri Lanka	
Party	Votes	%	Votes	%	Votes	%
UNP	28,310	50.29%	385,733	54.14%	2,838,005	50.71%
SLFP	25,361	45.05%	294,490	41.34%	1,785,369	31.90%
USA	2,112	3.75%	21,665	3.04%	141,983	2.54%
Other Parties (with < 1%)	513	0.91%	10,549	1.48%	67,723	1.21%
Valid Votes	56,296	95.54%	712,437	95.64%	5,596,468	93.87%
Rejected Votes	2,631	4.46%	32,497	4.36%	365,563	6.13%
Total Polled	58,927	75.36%	744,934	76.82%	5,962,031	63.60%
Registered Electors	78,192		969,658		9,374,164	

== Demographics ==
=== Ethnicity ===
The Mahara Polling Division has a Sinhalese majority (93.9%) . In comparison, the Gampaha Electoral District (which contains the Mahara Polling Division) has a Sinhalese majority (90.5%)

Ethnicity in Mahara
1. Sinhalese (93.9%)
2. Moor (2.60%)
3. Malay (1.80%)
4. Sri Lankan Tamil (1.10%)
5. Other (0.60%)

=== Religion ===
The Mahara Polling Division has a Buddhist majority (84.9%) . In comparison, the Gampaha Electoral District (which contains the Mahara Polling Division) has a Buddhist majority (71.3%) and a significant Roman Catholic population (19.5%)

Religion in Mahara
1. Buddhist (84.9%)
2. Roman Catholic (8.80%)
3. Muslim (4.50%)
4. Other Christian (1.20%)
5. Other (0.70%)
