= Gampola Polling Division =

Gampola
- Polling Division
- Coordinates: 7.170807°N 80.667777°E
- Country: Sri Lanka
- Province: Central Province, Sri Lanka
- Electoral District: Kandy Electoral District

Area
  - Total: 151.3 km^{2} (58.4 sq mi)

Population (2012)
  - Total: 80,187
  - Density: 530/km^{2} (1,400/sq mi)
- ISO 3166 code: EC-04L

The Gampola Polling Division is a Polling Division in the Kandy Electoral District, in the Central Province, Sri Lanka.

== Presidential Election Results ==
=== Summary ===
The winner of Gampola has matched the final country result 6 out of 8 times. Hence, Gampola is a Weak Bellwether for Presidential Elections.

Year	Gampola	Kandy Electoral District	MAE %	Sri Lanka	MAE %
2019	NDF	SLPP	7.56%	SLPP	9.57%
2015	NDF	NDF	2.34%	NDF	5.62%
2010	UPFA	UPFA	4.33%	UPFA	7.99%
2005	UNP	UNP	2.95%	UPFA	8.84%
1999	PA	PA	2.75%	PA	1.44%
1994	PA	PA	2.33%	PA	3.25%
1988	UNP	UNP	0.99%	UNP	3.94%
1982	UNP	UNP	1.66%	UNP	6.17%
Matches/Mean MAE	6/8	7/8	3.11%	8/8	5.85%

=== 2019 Sri Lankan Presidential Election ===
Party	Gampola		Kandy Electoral District		Sri Lanka	
Party	Votes	%	Votes	%	Votes	%
NDF	46,531	52.95%	417,355	44.64%	5,564,239	41.99%
SLPP	37,648	42.84%	471,502	50.43%	6,924,255	52.25%
Other Parties (with < 1%)	2,233	2.54%	22,479	2.40%	345,452	2.61%
NMPP	1,469	1.67%	23,539	2.52%	418,553	3.16%
Valid Votes	87,881	99.08%	934,875	99.04%	13,252,499	98.99%
Rejected Votes	816	0.92%	9,020	0.96%	135,452	1.01%
Total Polled	88,697	84.43%	943,895	84.89%	13,387,951	83.71%
Registered Electors	105,054		1,111,860		15,992,568	

=== 2015 Sri Lankan Presidential Election ===
Party	Gampola		Kandy Electoral District		Sri Lanka	
Party	Votes	%	Votes	%	Votes	%
NDF	45,328	56.81%	466,994	54.56%	6,217,162	51.28%
UPFA	33,293	41.73%	378,585	44.23%	5,768,090	47.58%
Other Parties (with < 1%)	1,164	1.46%	10,329	1.21%	138,200	1.14%
Valid Votes	79,785	98.74%	855,908	98.73%	12,123,452	98.85%
Rejected Votes	1,020	1.26%	10,993	1.27%	140,925	1.15%
Total Polled	80,805	79.05%	866,901	79.71%	12,264,377	78.69%
Registered Electors	102,219		1,087,542		15,585,942	

=== 2010 Sri Lankan Presidential Election ===
Party	Gampola		Kandy Electoral District		Sri Lanka	
Party	Votes	%	Votes	%	Votes	%
UPFA	33,078	49.62%	406,636	54.16%	6,015,934	57.88%
NDF	32,090	48.14%	329,492	43.89%	4,173,185	40.15%
Other Parties (with < 1%)	1,489	2.23%	14,658	1.95%	204,494	1.97%
Valid Votes	66,657	98.73%	750,786	98.85%	10,393,613	99.03%
Rejected Votes	857	1.27%	8,700	1.15%	101,838	0.97%
Total Polled	67,514	74.07%	759,486	75.87%	10,495,451	66.70%
Registered Electors	91,146		1,001,074		15,734,587	

=== 2005 Sri Lankan Presidential Election ===
Party	Gampola		Kandy Electoral District		Sri Lanka	
Party	Votes	%	Votes	%	Votes	%
UNP	35,829	57.23%	387,150	54.33%	4,706,366	48.43%
UPFA	25,790	41.20%	315,672	44.30%	4,887,152	50.29%
Other Parties (with < 1%)	984	1.57%	9,798	1.37%	123,521	1.27%
Valid Votes	62,603	98.37%	712,620	98.64%	9,717,039	98.88%
Rejected Votes	1,036	1.63%	9,817	1.36%	109,869	1.12%
Total Polled	63,639	75.61%	722,437	77.37%	9,826,908	69.51%
Registered Electors	84,167		933,754		14,136,979	

=== 1999 Sri Lankan Presidential Election ===
Party	Gampola		Kandy Electoral District		Sri Lanka	
Party	Votes	%	Votes	%	Votes	%
PA	29,986	53.65%	308,187	50.29%	4,312,157	51.12%
UNP	23,928	42.81%	276,360	45.10%	3,602,748	42.71%
Other Parties (with < 1%)	1,151	2.06%	12,752	2.08%	176,679	2.09%
JVP	828	1.48%	15,512	2.53%	343,927	4.08%
Valid Votes	55,893	97.17%	612,811	97.29%	8,435,754	97.69%
Rejected Votes	1,626	2.83%	17,060	2.71%	199,536	2.31%
Total Polled	57,519	78.65%	629,871	77.61%	8,635,290	72.17%
Registered Electors	73,137		811,606		11,965,536	

=== 1994 Sri Lankan Presidential Election ===
Party	Gampola		Kandy Electoral District		Sri Lanka	
Party	Votes	%	Votes	%	Votes	%
PA	29,558	59.04%	320,110	56.64%	4,709,205	62.28%
UNP	19,692	39.33%	235,519	41.68%	2,715,283	35.91%
Other Parties (with < 1%)	817	1.63%	9,488	1.68%	137,040	1.81%
Valid Votes	50,067	97.05%	565,117	97.55%	7,561,526	98.03%
Rejected Votes	1,524	2.95%	14,179	2.45%	151,706	1.97%
Total Polled	51,591	77.22%	579,296	77.85%	7,713,232	69.12%
Registered Electors	66,812		744,151		11,158,880	

=== 1988 Sri Lankan Presidential Election ===
Party	Gampola		Kandy Electoral District		Sri Lanka	
Party	Votes	%	Votes	%	Votes	%
UNP	24,800	56.12%	234,124	54.88%	2,569,199	50.43%
SLFP	18,976	42.94%	186,187	43.65%	2,289,857	44.95%
Other Parties (with < 1%)	418	0.95%	6,266	1.47%	235,701	4.63%
Valid Votes	44,194	98.84%	426,577	98.57%	5,094,754	98.24%
Rejected Votes	517	1.16%	6,167	1.43%	91,499	1.76%
Total Polled	44,711	80.67%	432,744	68.36%	5,186,256	55.87%
Registered Electors	55,425		633,030		9,283,143	

=== 1982 Sri Lankan Presidential Election ===
Party	Gampola		Kandy Electoral District		Sri Lanka	
Party	Votes	%	Votes	%	Votes	%
UNP	26,380	62.01%	289,621	59.80%	3,450,815	52.93%
SLFP	15,340	36.06%	178,647	36.89%	2,546,348	39.05%
JVP	528	1.24%	12,493	2.58%	273,428	4.19%
Other Parties (with < 1%)	293	0.69%	3,536	0.73%	249,460	3.83%
Valid Votes	42,541	99.08%	484,297	99.07%	6,520,156	98.78%
Rejected Votes	394	0.92%	4,548	0.93%	80,470	1.22%
Total Polled	42,935	84.91%	488,845	89.44%	6,600,626	80.15%
Registered Electors	50,563		546,565		8,235,358	

== Parliamentary Election Results ==
=== Summary ===
The winner of Gampola has matched the final country result 5 out of 7 times. Hence, Gampola is a Weak Bellwether for Parliamentary Elections.

Year	Gampola	Kandy Electoral District	MAE %	Sri Lanka	MAE %
2015	UNP	UNP	2.35%	UNP	8.21%
2010	UPFA	UPFA	3.81%	UPFA	4.88%
2004	UNP	UNP	3.63%	UPFA	9.05%
2001	UNP	UNP	5.97%	UNP	4.82%
2000	PA	PA	4.92%	PA	5.57%
1994	UNP	UNP	1.89%	PA	6.65%
1989	UNP	UNP	1.90%	UNP	5.80%
Matches/Mean MAE	5/7	5/7	3.50%	7/7	6.43%

=== 2015 Sri Lankan Parliamentary Election ===
Party	Gampola		Kandy Electoral District		Sri Lanka	
Party	Votes	%	Votes	%	Votes	%
UNP	42,657	58.22%	440,761	55.61%	5,098,916	45.77%
UPFA	27,025	36.89%	309,152	39.00%	4,732,664	42.48%
JVP	1,583	2.16%	30,669	3.87%	544,154	4.88%
CWC	1,399	1.91%	4,400	0.56%	17,107	0.15%
Other Parties (with < 1%)	600	0.82%	7,655	0.97%	82,981	0.74%
Valid Votes	73,264	94.53%	792,637	95.48%	11,140,333	95.35%
Rejected Votes	4,204	5.42%	37,065	4.46%	516,926	4.42%
Total Polled	77,505	75.82%	830,165	79.13%	11,684,111	77.66%
Registered Electors	102,219		1,049,160		15,044,490	

=== 2010 Sri Lankan Parliamentary Election ===
Party	Gampola		Kandy Electoral District		Sri Lanka	
Party	Votes	%	Votes	%	Votes	%
UPFA	27,843	57.53%	339,819	60.81%	4,846,388	60.38%
UNP	19,144	39.55%	192,798	34.50%	2,357,057	29.37%
DNA	1,228	2.54%	23,728	4.25%	441,251	5.50%
Other Parties (with < 1%)	186	0.38%	2,459	0.44%	30,354	0.38%
Valid Votes	48,401	87.62%	558,804	90.49%	8,026,322	96.03%
Rejected Votes	6,780	12.27%	58,333	9.45%	581,465	6.96%
Total Polled	55,239	60.60%	617,559	61.70%	8,358,246	59.29%
Registered Electors	91,146		1,000,861		14,097,690	

=== 2004 Sri Lankan Parliamentary Election ===
Party	Gampola		Kandy Electoral District		Sri Lanka	
Party	Votes	%	Votes	%	Votes	%
UNP	30,109	54.76%	313,859	49.99%	3,486,792	37.73%
UPFA	22,066	40.14%	268,131	42.71%	4,223,126	45.70%
JHU	2,515	4.57%	42,192	6.72%	552,723	5.98%
Other Parties (with < 1%)	289	0.53%	3,684	0.59%	64,227	0.69%
Valid Votes	54,979	92.57%	627,866	93.24%	9,241,931	94.52%
Rejected Votes	4,415	7.43%	45,484	6.75%	534,452	5.47%
Total Polled	59,394	72.70%	673,380	76.47%	9,777,821	75.74%
Registered Electors	81,694		880,634		12,909,631	

=== 2001 Sri Lankan Parliamentary Election ===
Party	Gampola		Kandy Electoral District		Sri Lanka	
Party	Votes	%	Votes	%	Votes	%
UNP	25,089	47.35%	314,297	52.77%	4,086,026	45.62%
PA	24,798	46.80%	233,637	39.23%	3,330,815	37.19%
JVP	2,168	4.09%	37,146	6.24%	815,353	9.10%
Other Parties (with < 1%)	930	1.76%	10,496	1.76%	129,347	1.44%
Valid Votes	52,985	92.43%	595,576	93.40%	8,955,844	94.77%
Rejected Votes	4,338	7.57%	42,103	6.60%	494,009	5.23%
Total Polled	57,323	73.63%	637,679	76.03%	9,449,878	76.03%
Registered Electors	77,854		838,687		12,428,762	

=== 2000 Sri Lankan Parliamentary Election ===
Party	Gampola		Kandy Electoral District		Sri Lanka	
Party	Votes	%	Votes	%	Votes	%
PA	29,140	53.64%	282,282	46.66%	3,899,329	45.33%
UNP	19,769	36.39%	243,623	40.27%	3,451,765	40.12%
NUA	2,544	4.68%	32,023	5.29%	185,593	2.16%
Other Parties (with < 1%)	1,688	3.11%	25,435	4.20%	289,668	3.37%
JVP	1,181	2.17%	21,565	3.56%	518,725	6.03%
Valid Votes	54,322	N/A	604,928	N/A	8,602,617	N/A

=== 1994 Sri Lankan Parliamentary Election ===
Party	Gampola		Kandy Electoral District		Sri Lanka	
Party	Votes	%	Votes	%	Votes	%
UNP	27,942	54.49%	301,824	52.35%	3,498,370	44.04%
PA	22,962	44.78%	267,683	46.43%	3,887,805	48.94%
Other Parties (with < 1%)	376	0.73%	7,045	1.22%	175,576	2.21%
Valid Votes	51,280	94.27%	576,552	94.89%	7,943,688	95.20%
Rejected Votes	3,117	5.73%	31,019	5.11%	400,395	4.80%
Total Polled	54,397	81.42%	607,571	81.67%	8,344,095	74.75%
Registered Electors	66,812		743,939		11,163,064	

=== 1989 Sri Lankan Parliamentary Election ===
Party	Gampola		Kandy Electoral District		Sri Lanka	
Party	Votes	%	Votes	%	Votes	%
UNP	23,262	60.18%	204,973	61.72%	2,838,005	50.71%
SLFP	13,450	34.80%	105,977	31.91%	1,785,369	31.90%
SLMC	1,555	4.02%	14,697	4.43%	202,016	3.61%
Other Parties (with < 1%)	385	1.00%	6,462	1.95%	209,706	3.75%
Valid Votes	38,652	93.60%	332,109	93.69%	5,596,468	93.87%
Rejected Votes	2,642	6.40%	22,374	6.31%	365,563	6.13%
Total Polled	41,294	75.61%	354,483	56.42%	5,962,031	63.60%
Registered Electors	54,611		628,317		9,374,164	

== Demographics ==
=== Ethnicity ===
The Gampola Polling Division has a Sinhalese majority (61.3%), a significant Indian Tamil population (16.6%) and a significant Moor population (12.6%) . In comparison, the Kandy Electoral District (which contains the Gampola Polling Division) has a Sinhalese majority (74.4%) and a significant Moor population (13.9%)

Ethnicity in Gampola
1. Sinhalese (61.3%)
2. Indian Tamil (16.6%)
3. Moor (12.6%)
4. Sri Lankan Tamil (9.40%)
5. Other (0.20%)

=== Religion ===
The Gampola Polling Division has a Buddhist majority (60.9%), a significant Hindu population (24.1%) and a significant Muslim population (12.8%) . In comparison, the Kandy Electoral District (which contains the Gampola Polling Division) has a Buddhist majority (73.4%) and a significant Muslim population (14.3%)

Religion in Gampola
1. Buddhist (60.9%)
2. Hindu (24.1%)
3. Muslim (12.8%)
4. Other Christian (1.20%)
5. Other (1.00%)
