= Minuwangoda Polling Division =

Minuwangoda
- Polling Division
- Coordinates: 7.151204°N 79.971281°E
- Country: Sri Lanka
- Province: Western Province, Sri Lanka
- Electoral District: Gampaha Electoral District

Area
  - Total: 143.33 km^{2} (55.34 sq mi)

Population (2012)
  - Total: 178,331
  - Density: 1,244/km^{2} (3,220/sq mi)
- ISO 3166 code: EC-02F

The Minuwangoda Polling Division is a Polling Division in the Gampaha Electoral District, in the Western Province, Sri Lanka.

== Presidential Election Results ==
=== Summary ===
The winner of Minuwangoda has matched the final country result 6 out of 8 times. Hence, Minuwangoda is a Weak Bellwether for Presidential Elections.

Year	Minuwangoda	Gampaha Electoral District	MAE %	Sri Lanka	MAE %
2024	NPP	NPP		NPP	
2019	SLPP	SLPP	1.67%	SLPP	8.64%
2015	UPFA	NDF	1.72%	NDF	3.37%
2010	UPFA	UPFA	2.21%	UPFA	5.54%
2005	UPFA	UPFA	1.34%	UPFA	5.64%
1999	PA	PA	0.35%	PA	4.77%
1994	PA	PA	0.81%	PA	1.45%
1988	SLFP	SLFP	0.40%	UNP	2.92%
1982	UNP	UNP	1.23%	UNP	3.17%
Matches/Mean MAE	6/8	7/8	1.22%	8/8	4.43%

=== 2019 Sri Lankan Presidential Election ===
Party	Minuwangoda		Gampaha Electoral District		Sri Lanka	
Party	Votes	%	Votes	%	Votes	%
SLPP	69,978	61.03%	855,870	59.28%	6,924,255	52.25%
NDF	37,212	32.45%	494,671	34.26%	5,564,239	41.99%
NMPP	5,259	4.59%	61,760	4.28%	418,553	3.16%
Other Parties (with < 1%)	2,217	1.93%	31,499	2.18%	345,452	2.61%
Valid Votes	114,666	99.03%	1,443,800	98.92%	13,252,499	98.99%
Rejected Votes	1,123	0.97%	15,751	1.08%	135,452	1.01%
Total Polled	115,789	84.48%	1,459,551	83.31%	13,387,951	83.71%
Registered Electors	137,067		1,751,892		15,992,568	

=== 2015 Sri Lankan Presidential Election ===
Party	Minuwangoda		Gampaha Electoral District		Sri Lanka	
Party	Votes	%	Votes	%	Votes	%
UPFA	54,929	51.21%	664,347	49.49%	5,768,090	47.58%
NDF	51,581	48.09%	669,007	49.83%	6,217,162	51.28%
Other Parties (with < 1%)	760	0.71%	9,142	0.68%	138,200	1.14%
Valid Votes	107,270	99.09%	1,342,496	98.92%	12,123,452	98.85%
Rejected Votes	986	0.91%	14,647	1.08%	140,925	1.15%
Total Polled	108,256	81.41%	1,357,143	80.77%	12,264,377	78.69%
Registered Electors	132,981		1,680,263		15,585,942	

=== 2010 Sri Lankan Presidential Election ===
Party	Minuwangoda		Gampaha Electoral District		Sri Lanka	
Party	Votes	%	Votes	%	Votes	%
UPFA	60,318	63.87%	718,716	61.66%	6,015,934	57.88%
NDF	33,057	35.01%	434,506	37.28%	4,173,185	40.15%
Other Parties (with < 1%)	1,060	1.12%	12,426	1.07%	204,494	1.97%
Valid Votes	94,435	99.35%	1,165,648	99.24%	10,393,613	99.03%
Rejected Votes	618	0.65%	8,960	0.76%	101,838	0.97%
Total Polled	95,053	78.65%	1,174,608	78.03%	10,495,451	66.70%
Registered Electors	120,860		1,505,363		15,734,587	

=== 2005 Sri Lankan Presidential Election ===
Party	Minuwangoda		Gampaha Electoral District		Sri Lanka	
Party	Votes	%	Votes	%	Votes	%
UPFA	49,509	56.12%	596,698	54.78%	4,887,152	50.29%
UNP	37,801	42.85%	481,764	44.23%	4,706,366	48.43%
Other Parties (with < 1%)	910	1.03%	10,815	0.99%	123,521	1.27%
Valid Votes	88,220	98.94%	1,089,277	98.94%	9,717,039	98.88%
Rejected Votes	947	1.06%	11,724	1.06%	109,869	1.12%
Total Polled	89,167	80.18%	1,101,001	79.17%	9,826,908	69.51%
Registered Electors	111,211		1,390,691		14,136,979	

=== 1999 Sri Lankan Presidential Election ===
Party	Minuwangoda		Gampaha Electoral District		Sri Lanka	
Party	Votes	%	Votes	%	Votes	%
PA	42,314	56.05%	532,796	56.58%	4,312,157	51.12%
UNP	28,328	37.53%	353,969	37.59%	3,602,748	42.71%
JVP	3,658	4.85%	40,472	4.30%	343,927	4.08%
Other Parties (with < 1%)	1,191	1.58%	14,382	1.53%	176,679	2.09%
Valid Votes	75,491	98.03%	941,619	97.84%	8,435,754	97.69%
Rejected Votes	1,514	1.97%	20,768	2.16%	199,536	2.31%
Total Polled	77,005	77.84%	962,387	77.12%	8,635,290	72.17%
Registered Electors	98,927		1,247,860		11,965,536	

=== 1994 Sri Lankan Presidential Election ===
Party	Minuwangoda		Gampaha Electoral District		Sri Lanka	
Party	Votes	%	Votes	%	Votes	%
PA	42,041	63.91%	550,654	64.74%	4,709,205	62.28%
UNP	22,839	34.72%	288,608	33.93%	2,715,283	35.91%
Other Parties (with < 1%)	905	1.38%	11,256	1.32%	137,040	1.81%
Valid Votes	65,785	98.66%	850,518	98.48%	7,561,526	98.03%
Rejected Votes	892	1.34%	13,137	1.52%	151,706	1.97%
Total Polled	66,677	74.76%	863,655	74.16%	7,713,232	69.12%
Registered Electors	89,192		1,164,625		11,158,880	

=== 1988 Sri Lankan Presidential Election ===
Party	Minuwangoda		Gampaha Electoral District		Sri Lanka	
Party	Votes	%	Votes	%	Votes	%
SLFP	29,751	49.11%	355,553	48.83%	2,289,857	44.95%
UNP	29,424	48.57%	350,092	48.08%	2,569,199	50.43%
SLMP	1,404	2.32%	22,467	3.09%	235,701	4.63%
Valid Votes	60,579	98.66%	728,112	98.63%	5,094,754	98.24%
Rejected Votes	825	1.34%	10,108	1.37%	91,499	1.76%
Total Polled	61,404	78.67%	738,220	74.93%	5,186,256	55.87%
Registered Electors	78,056		985,206		9,283,143	

=== 1982 Sri Lankan Presidential Election ===
Party	Minuwangoda		Gampaha Electoral District		Sri Lanka	
Party	Votes	%	Votes	%	Votes	%
UNP	29,672	51.27%	365,847	52.50%	3,450,815	52.93%
SLFP	25,849	44.67%	301,808	43.31%	2,546,348	39.05%
JVP	1,992	3.44%	23,701	3.40%	273,428	4.19%
Other Parties (with < 1%)	357	0.62%	5,491	0.79%	249,460	3.83%
Valid Votes	57,870	99.32%	696,847	99.15%	6,520,156	98.78%
Rejected Votes	399	0.68%	5,992	0.85%	80,470	1.22%
Total Polled	58,269	83.76%	702,839	82.70%	6,600,626	80.15%
Registered Electors	69,566		849,896		8,235,358	

== Parliamentary Election Results ==
=== Summary ===
The winner of Minuwangoda has matched the final country result 5 out of 7 times. Hence, Minuwangoda is a Weak Bellwether for Parliamentary Elections.

Year	Minuwangoda	Gampaha Electoral District	MAE %	Sri Lanka	MAE %
2015	UPFA	UNP	2.25%	UNP	2.67%
2010	UPFA	UPFA	2.64%	UPFA	4.66%
2004	UPFA	UPFA	0.60%	UPFA	3.66%
2001	PA	UNP	1.39%	UNP	4.51%
2000	PA	PA	0.59%	PA	2.62%
1994	PA	PA	0.05%	PA	4.78%
1989	UNP	UNP	0.70%	UNP	5.30%
Matches/Mean MAE	5/7	7/7	1.17%	7/7	4.03%

=== 2015 Sri Lankan Parliamentary Election ===
Party	Minuwangoda		Gampaha Electoral District		Sri Lanka	
Party	Votes	%	Votes	%	Votes	%
UPFA	45,898	47.20%	549,958	44.96%	4,732,664	42.48%
UNP	43,373	44.61%	577,004	47.17%	5,098,916	45.77%
JVP	7,400	7.61%	87,880	7.18%	544,154	4.88%
Other Parties (with < 1%)	565	0.58%	8,332	0.68%	81,501	0.73%
Valid Votes	97,236	95.33%	1,223,174	95.51%	11,140,333	95.35%
Rejected Votes	4,667	4.58%	56,246	4.39%	516,926	4.42%
Total Polled	102,001	76.70%	1,280,647	78.21%	11,684,111	77.66%
Registered Electors	132,981		1,637,537		15,044,490	

=== 2010 Sri Lankan Parliamentary Election ===
Party	Minuwangoda		Gampaha Electoral District		Sri Lanka	
Party	Votes	%	Votes	%	Votes	%
UPFA	49,033	66.37%	589,476	63.40%	4,846,388	60.38%
UNP	19,295	26.12%	266,523	28.67%	2,357,057	29.37%
DNA	5,270	7.13%	69,747	7.50%	441,251	5.50%
Other Parties (with < 1%)	279	0.38%	3,985	0.43%	19,003	0.24%
Valid Votes	73,877	95.19%	929,731	94.83%	8,026,322	96.03%
Rejected Votes	3,675	4.73%	50,234	5.12%	581,465	6.96%
Total Polled	77,614	64.22%	980,467	65.06%	8,358,246	59.29%
Registered Electors	120,860		1,506,969		14,097,690	

=== 2004 Sri Lankan Parliamentary Election ===
Party	Minuwangoda		Gampaha Electoral District		Sri Lanka	
Party	Votes	%	Votes	%	Votes	%
UPFA	41,026	51.49%	509,963	51.52%	4,223,126	45.70%
UNP	28,632	35.93%	367,572	37.14%	3,486,792	37.73%
JHU	9,292	11.66%	102,516	10.36%	552,723	5.98%
Other Parties (with < 1%)	733	0.92%	9,691	0.98%	57,229	0.62%
Valid Votes	79,683	96.14%	989,742	95.96%	9,241,931	94.52%
Rejected Votes	3,169	3.82%	41,462	4.02%	534,452	5.47%
Total Polled	82,878	76.97%	1,031,464	77.72%	9,777,821	75.74%
Registered Electors	107,679		1,327,145		12,909,631	

=== 2001 Sri Lankan Parliamentary Election ===
Party	Minuwangoda		Gampaha Electoral District		Sri Lanka	
Party	Votes	%	Votes	%	Votes	%
PA	34,348	44.09%	428,780	43.08%	3,330,815	37.19%
UNP	32,726	42.01%	437,289	43.94%	4,086,026	45.62%
JVP	9,627	12.36%	113,990	11.45%	815,353	9.10%
Other Parties (with < 1%)	1,203	1.54%	15,171	1.52%	137,826	1.54%
Valid Votes	77,904	96.40%	995,230	96.30%	8,955,844	94.77%
Rejected Votes	2,906	3.60%	38,187	3.70%	494,009	5.23%
Total Polled	80,810	78.11%	1,033,417	80.36%	9,449,878	76.03%
Registered Electors	103,461		1,285,973		12,428,762	

=== 2000 Sri Lankan Parliamentary Election ===
Party	Minuwangoda		Gampaha Electoral District		Sri Lanka	
Party	Votes	%	Votes	%	Votes	%
PA	38,350	49.61%	470,018	48.87%	3,899,329	45.33%
UNP	30,025	38.84%	378,328	39.34%	3,451,765	40.12%
JVP	6,148	7.95%	73,110	7.60%	518,725	6.03%
SU	1,530	1.98%	20,297	2.11%	127,859	1.49%
Other Parties (with < 1%)	1,244	1.61%	19,956	2.08%	319,123	3.71%
Valid Votes	77,297	N/A	961,709	N/A	8,602,617	N/A

=== 1994 Sri Lankan Parliamentary Election ===
Party	Minuwangoda		Gampaha Electoral District		Sri Lanka	
Party	Votes	%	Votes	%	Votes	%
PA	39,893	56.83%	509,030	56.79%	3,887,805	48.94%
UNP	29,455	41.96%	375,631	41.91%	3,498,370	44.04%
SLPF	844	1.20%	11,627	1.30%	90,078	1.13%
Valid Votes	70,192	96.84%	896,288	96.39%	7,943,688	95.20%
Rejected Votes	2,288	3.16%	33,553	3.61%	400,395	4.80%
Total Polled	72,480	81.26%	929,841	79.65%	8,344,095	74.75%
Registered Electors	89,192		1,167,469		11,163,064	

=== 1989 Sri Lankan Parliamentary Election ===
Party	Minuwangoda		Gampaha Electoral District		Sri Lanka	
Party	Votes	%	Votes	%	Votes	%
UNP	32,021	54.41%	385,733	54.14%	2,838,005	50.71%
SLFP	25,061	42.58%	294,490	41.34%	1,785,369	31.90%
USA	1,015	1.72%	21,665	3.04%	141,983	2.54%
ELJP	756	1.28%	10,549	1.48%	67,723	1.21%
Valid Votes	58,853	96.03%	712,437	95.64%	5,596,468	93.87%
Rejected Votes	2,436	3.97%	32,497	4.36%	365,563	6.13%
Total Polled	61,289	80.35%	744,934	76.82%	5,962,031	63.60%
Registered Electors	76,279		969,658		9,374,164	

== Demographics ==
=== Ethnicity ===
The Minuwangoda Polling Division has a Sinhalese majority (95.8%) . In comparison, the Gampaha Electoral District (which contains the Minuwangoda Polling Division) has a Sinhalese majority (90.5%)

Ethnicity in Minuwangoda
1. Sinhalese (95.8%)
2. Moor (3.30%)
3. Other (0.90%)

=== Religion ===
The Minuwangoda Polling Division has a Buddhist majority (88.5%) . In comparison, the Gampaha Electoral District (which contains the Minuwangoda Polling Division) has a Buddhist majority (71.3%) and a significant Roman Catholic population (19.5%)

Religion in Minuwangoda
1. Buddhist (88.5%)
2. Roman Catholic (6.50%)
3. Muslim (3.50%)
4. Other Christian (1.20%)
5. Other (0.40%)
