= Polgahawela Polling Division =

Polgahawela
- Polling Division
- Coordinates: 7.461812°N 80.277710°E
- Country: Sri Lanka
- Province: North Western Province, Sri Lanka
- Electoral District: Kurunegala Electoral District

Area
  - Total: 311.05 km^{2} (120.10 sq mi)

Population (2012)
  - Total: 135,712
  - Density: 436/km^{2} (1,130/sq mi)
- ISO 3166 code: EC-15K

The Polgahawela Polling Division is a Polling Division in the Kurunegala Electoral District, in the North Western Province, Sri Lanka.

== Presidential Election Results ==
=== Summary ===
The winner of Polgahawela has matched the final country result 6 out of 8 times. Hence, Polgahawela is a Weak Bellwether for Presidential Elections.

Year	Polgahawela	Kurunegala Electoral District	MAE %	Sri Lanka	MAE %
2019	SLPP	SLPP	0.08%	SLPP	5.13%
2015	UPFA	UPFA	1.55%	NDF	4.09%
2010	UPFA	UPFA	0.11%	UPFA	5.00%
2005	UPFA	UPFA	0.65%	UPFA	1.17%
1999	PA	PA	0.82%	PA	1.51%
1994	PA	PA	2.23%	PA	5.22%
1988	SLFP	UNP	5.24%	UNP	5.75%
1982	UNP	UNP	0.58%	UNP	2.59%
Matches/Mean MAE	6/8	7/8	1.41%	8/8	3.81%

=== 2019 Sri Lankan Presidential Election ===
Party	Polgahawela		Kurunegala Electoral District		Sri Lanka	
Party	Votes	%	Votes	%	Votes	%
SLPP	36,836	57.98%	652,278	57.90%	6,924,255	52.25%
NDF	23,458	36.92%	416,961	37.01%	5,564,239	41.99%
NMPP	2,085	3.28%	36,178	3.21%	418,553	3.16%
Other Parties (with < 1%)	1,150	1.81%	21,193	1.88%	345,452	2.61%
Valid Votes	63,529	99.26%	1,126,610	99.25%	13,252,499	98.99%
Rejected Votes	472	0.74%	8,522	0.75%	135,452	1.01%
Total Polled	64,001	84.41%	1,135,132	85.24%	13,387,951	83.71%
Registered Electors	75,819		1,331,705		15,992,568	

=== 2015 Sri Lankan Presidential Election ===
Party	Polgahawela		Kurunegala Electoral District		Sri Lanka	
Party	Votes	%	Votes	%	Votes	%
UPFA	31,108	51.92%	556,868	53.46%	5,768,090	47.58%
NDF	28,365	47.34%	476,602	45.76%	6,217,162	51.28%
Other Parties (with < 1%)	446	0.74%	8,154	0.78%	138,200	1.14%
Valid Votes	59,919	99.28%	1,041,624	99.12%	12,123,452	98.85%
Rejected Votes	435	0.72%	9,285	0.88%	140,925	1.15%
Total Polled	60,354	78.06%	1,050,909	78.82%	12,264,377	78.69%
Registered Electors	77,321		1,333,377		15,585,942	

=== 2010 Sri Lankan Presidential Election ===
Party	Polgahawela		Kurunegala Electoral District		Sri Lanka	
Party	Votes	%	Votes	%	Votes	%
UPFA	34,501	63.24%	582,784	63.08%	6,015,934	57.88%
NDF	19,328	35.43%	327,594	35.46%	4,173,185	40.15%
Other Parties (with < 1%)	726	1.33%	13,515	1.46%	204,494	1.97%
Valid Votes	54,555	99.43%	923,893	99.29%	10,393,613	99.03%
Rejected Votes	311	0.57%	6,644	0.71%	101,838	0.97%
Total Polled	54,866	74.87%	930,537	75.59%	10,495,451	66.70%
Registered Electors	73,283		1,230,966		15,734,587	

=== 2005 Sri Lankan Presidential Election ===
Party	Polgahawela		Kurunegala Electoral District		Sri Lanka	
Party	Votes	%	Votes	%	Votes	%
UPFA	27,581	51.59%	468,507	52.26%	4,887,152	50.29%
UNP	25,317	47.35%	418,809	46.72%	4,706,366	48.43%
Other Parties (with < 1%)	569	1.06%	9,181	1.02%	123,521	1.27%
Valid Votes	53,467	99.19%	896,497	99.07%	9,717,039	98.88%
Rejected Votes	437	0.81%	8,458	0.93%	109,869	1.12%
Total Polled	53,904	77.20%	904,955	77.87%	9,826,908	69.51%
Registered Electors	69,821		1,162,099		14,136,979	

=== 1999 Sri Lankan Presidential Election ===
Party	Polgahawela		Kurunegala Electoral District		Sri Lanka	
Party	Votes	%	Votes	%	Votes	%
PA	22,890	50.22%	377,483	50.77%	4,312,157	51.12%
UNP	20,537	45.06%	326,327	43.89%	3,602,748	42.71%
JVP	1,353	2.97%	27,354	3.68%	343,927	4.08%
Other Parties (with < 1%)	799	1.75%	12,355	1.66%	176,679	2.09%
Valid Votes	45,579	98.05%	743,519	97.99%	8,435,754	97.69%
Rejected Votes	908	1.95%	15,272	2.01%	199,536	2.31%
Total Polled	46,487	75.12%	758,791	75.83%	8,635,290	72.17%
Registered Electors	61,882		1,000,624		11,965,536	

=== 1994 Sri Lankan Presidential Election ===
Party	Polgahawela		Kurunegala Electoral District		Sri Lanka	
Party	Votes	%	Votes	%	Votes	%
PA	23,447	57.10%	403,838	59.36%	4,709,205	62.28%
UNP	17,030	41.47%	266,740	39.21%	2,715,283	35.91%
Other Parties (with < 1%)	585	1.42%	9,766	1.44%	137,040	1.81%
Valid Votes	41,062	98.45%	680,344	98.48%	7,561,526	98.03%
Rejected Votes	647	1.55%	10,511	1.52%	151,706	1.97%
Total Polled	41,709	74.65%	690,855	76.97%	7,713,232	69.12%
Registered Electors	55,872		897,539		11,158,880	

=== 1988 Sri Lankan Presidential Election ===
Party	Polgahawela		Kurunegala Electoral District		Sri Lanka	
Party	Votes	%	Votes	%	Votes	%
SLFP	15,872	52.36%	182,220	46.89%	2,289,857	44.95%
UNP	13,915	45.90%	198,662	51.12%	2,569,199	50.43%
SLMP	528	1.74%	7,717	1.99%	235,701	4.63%
Valid Votes	30,315	98.78%	388,599	98.91%	5,094,754	98.24%
Rejected Votes	375	1.22%	4,281	1.09%	91,499	1.76%
Total Polled	30,690	59.75%	392,880	53.49%	5,186,256	55.87%
Registered Electors	51,363		734,453		9,283,143	

=== 1982 Sri Lankan Presidential Election ===
Party	Polgahawela		Kurunegala Electoral District		Sri Lanka	
Party	Votes	%	Votes	%	Votes	%
UNP	22,384	55.77%	345,769	55.77%	3,450,815	52.93%
SLFP	16,625	41.42%	248,479	40.08%	2,546,348	39.05%
JVP	911	2.27%	21,835	3.52%	273,428	4.19%
Other Parties (with < 1%)	214	0.53%	3,895	0.63%	249,460	3.83%
Valid Votes	40,134	98.44%	619,978	99.13%	6,520,156	98.78%
Rejected Votes	637	1.56%	5,431	0.87%	80,470	1.22%
Total Polled	40,771	85.27%	625,409	86.00%	6,600,626	80.15%
Registered Electors	47,812		727,202		8,235,358	

== Parliamentary Election Results ==
=== Summary ===
The winner of Polgahawela has matched the final country result 5 out of 7 times. Hence, Polgahawela is a Weak Bellwether for Parliamentary Elections.

Year	Polgahawela	Kurunegala Electoral District	MAE %	Sri Lanka	MAE %
2015	UPFA	UPFA	0.92%	UNP	3.01%
2010	UPFA	UPFA	0.58%	UPFA	2.37%
2004	UPFA	UPFA	1.08%	UPFA	4.00%
2001	UNP	UNP	1.00%	UNP	4.04%
2000	PA	PA	2.52%	PA	2.33%
1994	UNP	PA	3.92%	PA	3.57%
1989	UNP	UNP	6.09%	UNP	4.03%
Matches/Mean MAE	5/7	6/7	2.30%	7/7	3.34%

=== 2015 Sri Lankan Parliamentary Election ===
Party	Polgahawela		Kurunegala Electoral District		Sri Lanka	
Party	Votes	%	Votes	%	Votes	%
UPFA	26,517	48.34%	474,124	49.29%	4,732,664	42.48%
UNP	25,705	46.86%	441,275	45.87%	5,098,916	45.77%
JVP	2,395	4.37%	41,077	4.27%	544,154	4.88%
Other Parties (with < 1%)	240	0.44%	5,496	0.57%	83,041	0.75%
Valid Votes	54,857	95.62%	961,972	95.39%	11,140,333	95.35%
Rejected Votes	2,493	4.35%	46,036	4.56%	516,926	4.42%
Total Polled	57,370	74.20%	1,008,459	79.63%	11,684,111	77.66%
Registered Electors	77,321		1,266,443		15,044,490	

=== 2010 Sri Lankan Parliamentary Election ===
Party	Polgahawela		Kurunegala Electoral District		Sri Lanka	
Party	Votes	%	Votes	%	Votes	%
UPFA	25,485	63.41%	429,316	63.91%	4,846,388	60.38%
UNP	12,519	31.15%	213,713	31.81%	2,357,057	29.37%
DNA	2,070	5.15%	26,440	3.94%	441,251	5.50%
Other Parties (with < 1%)	116	0.29%	2,288	0.34%	34,779	0.43%
Valid Votes	40,190	93.35%	671,757	92.58%	8,026,322	96.03%
Rejected Votes	2,835	6.58%	53,130	7.32%	581,465	6.96%
Total Polled	43,054	58.75%	725,566	59.08%	8,358,246	59.29%
Registered Electors	73,283		1,228,044		14,097,690	

=== 2004 Sri Lankan Parliamentary Election ===
Party	Polgahawela		Kurunegala Electoral District		Sri Lanka	
Party	Votes	%	Votes	%	Votes	%
UPFA	24,473	50.62%	412,157	51.95%	4,223,126	45.70%
UNP	20,435	42.27%	340,768	42.95%	3,486,792	37.73%
JHU	3,237	6.70%	37,459	4.72%	552,723	5.98%
Other Parties (with < 1%)	204	0.42%	2,976	0.38%	64,640	0.70%
Valid Votes	48,349	95.83%	793,360	95.14%	9,241,931	94.52%
Rejected Votes	2,090	4.14%	40,261	4.83%	534,452	5.47%
Total Polled	50,453	74.10%	833,908	76.54%	9,777,821	75.74%
Registered Electors	68,091		1,089,482		12,909,631	

=== 2001 Sri Lankan Parliamentary Election ===
Party	Polgahawela		Kurunegala Electoral District		Sri Lanka	
Party	Votes	%	Votes	%	Votes	%
UNP	24,494	50.12%	382,768	48.59%	4,086,026	45.62%
PA	20,487	41.92%	332,775	42.24%	3,330,815	37.19%
JVP	3,223	6.59%	63,652	8.08%	815,353	9.10%
Other Parties (with < 1%)	670	1.37%	8,533	1.08%	133,770	1.49%
Valid Votes	48,874	95.65%	787,728	95.35%	8,955,844	94.77%
Rejected Votes	2,224	4.35%	38,451	4.65%	494,009	5.23%
Total Polled	51,098	77.31%	826,179	78.98%	9,449,878	76.03%
Registered Electors	66,099		1,046,102		12,428,762	

=== 2000 Sri Lankan Parliamentary Election ===
Party	Polgahawela		Kurunegala Electoral District		Sri Lanka	
Party	Votes	%	Votes	%	Votes	%
PA	21,421	46.17%	358,794	48.75%	3,899,329	45.33%
UNP	20,788	44.81%	308,106	41.86%	3,451,765	40.12%
JVP	2,374	5.12%	40,780	5.54%	518,725	6.03%
NUA	769	1.66%	11,927	1.62%	185,593	2.16%
Other Parties (with < 1%)	527	1.14%	9,730	1.32%	93,655	1.09%
SU	516	1.11%	6,691	0.91%	127,859	1.49%
Valid Votes	46,395	N/A	736,028	N/A	8,602,617	N/A

=== 1994 Sri Lankan Parliamentary Election ===
Party	Polgahawela		Kurunegala Electoral District		Sri Lanka	
Party	Votes	%	Votes	%	Votes	%
UNP	22,167	50.92%	332,547	47.02%	3,498,370	44.04%
PA	20,829	47.85%	366,856	51.87%	3,887,805	48.94%
Other Parties (with < 1%)	537	1.23%	7,876	1.11%	158,616	2.00%
Valid Votes	43,533	96.15%	707,279	95.92%	7,943,688	95.20%
Rejected Votes	1,745	3.85%	30,071	4.08%	400,395	4.80%
Total Polled	45,278	81.04%	737,350	82.15%	8,344,095	74.75%
Registered Electors	55,872		897,580		11,163,064	

=== 1989 Sri Lankan Parliamentary Election ===
Party	Polgahawela		Kurunegala Electoral District		Sri Lanka	
Party	Votes	%	Votes	%	Votes	%
UNP	19,458	51.92%	314,724	58.51%	2,838,005	50.71%
SLFP	15,847	42.29%	195,526	36.35%	1,785,369	31.90%
ELJP	1,687	4.50%	13,759	2.56%	67,723	1.21%
Other Parties (with < 1%)	482	1.29%	13,907	2.59%	232,463	4.15%
Valid Votes	37,474	95.02%	537,916	94.02%	5,596,468	93.87%
Rejected Votes	1,964	4.98%	34,212	5.98%	365,563	6.13%
Total Polled	39,438	78.47%	572,128	72.88%	5,962,031	63.60%
Registered Electors	50,258		784,991		9,374,164	

== Demographics ==
=== Ethnicity ===
The Polgahawela Polling Division has a Sinhalese majority (93.5%) . In comparison, the Kurunegala Electoral District (which contains the Polgahawela Polling Division) has a Sinhalese majority (91.4%)

Ethnicity in Polgahawela
1. Sinhalese (93.5%)
2. Moor (4.80%)
3. Other (1.60%)

=== Religion ===
The Polgahawela Polling Division has a Buddhist majority (91.8%) . In comparison, the Kurunegala Electoral District (which contains the Polgahawela Polling Division) has a Buddhist majority (88.5%)

Religion in Polgahawela
1. Buddhist (91.8%)
2. Muslim (5.10%)
3. Roman Catholic (1.60%)
4. Hindu (1.00%)
5. Other (0.50%)
