= Divulapitiya Polling Division =

Divulapitiya
- Polling Division
- Coordinates: 7.256056°N 80.002857°E
- Country: Sri Lanka
- Province: Western Province, Sri Lanka
- Electoral District: Gampaha Electoral District

Area
  - Total: 219.56 km^{2} (84.77 sq mi)

Population (2012)
  - Total: 144,506
  - Density: 658/km^{2} (1,700/sq mi)
- ISO 3166 code: EC-02D

The Divulapitiya Polling Division is a Polling Division in the Gampaha Electoral District, in the Western Province, Sri Lanka.

== Presidential Election Results ==
=== Summary ===
The winner of Divulapitiya has matched the final country result 6 out of 8 times. Hence, Divulapitiya is a Weak Bellwether for Presidential Elections.

Year	Divulapitiya	Gampaha Electoral District	MAE %	Sri Lanka	MAE %
2019	SLPP	SLPP	0.61%	SLPP	7.04%
2015	UPFA	NDF	3.44%	NDF	5.08%
2010	UPFA	UPFA	0.43%	UPFA	3.77%
2005	UPFA	UPFA	2.33%	UPFA	1.98%
1999	PA	PA	2.91%	PA	2.10%
1994	PA	PA	5.68%	PA	3.42%
1988	SLFP	SLFP	0.56%	UNP	2.72%
1982	UNP	UNP	2.03%	UNP	3.94%
Matches/Mean MAE	6/8	7/8	2.25%	8/8	3.76%

=== 2019 Sri Lankan Presidential Election ===
Party	Divulapitiya		Gampaha Electoral District		Sri Lanka	
Party	Votes	%	Votes	%	Votes	%
SLPP	55,371	59.93%	855,870	59.28%	6,924,255	52.25%
NDF	32,149	34.80%	494,671	34.26%	5,564,239	41.99%
NMPP	3,117	3.37%	61,760	4.28%	418,553	3.16%
Other Parties (with < 1%)	1,755	1.90%	31,499	2.18%	345,452	2.61%
Valid Votes	92,392	99.16%	1,443,800	98.92%	13,252,499	98.99%
Rejected Votes	780	0.84%	15,751	1.08%	135,452	1.01%
Total Polled	93,172	84.52%	1,459,551	83.31%	13,387,951	83.71%
Registered Electors	110,231		1,751,892		15,992,568	

=== 2015 Sri Lankan Presidential Election ===
Party	Divulapitiya		Gampaha Electoral District		Sri Lanka	
Party	Votes	%	Votes	%	Votes	%
UPFA	45,813	52.91%	664,347	49.49%	5,768,090	47.58%
NDF	40,112	46.33%	669,007	49.83%	6,217,162	51.28%
Other Parties (with < 1%)	658	0.76%	9,142	0.68%	138,200	1.14%
Valid Votes	86,583	99.20%	1,342,496	98.92%	12,123,452	98.85%
Rejected Votes	701	0.80%	14,647	1.08%	140,925	1.15%
Total Polled	87,284	80.42%	1,357,143	80.77%	12,264,377	78.69%
Registered Electors	108,529		1,680,263		15,585,942	

=== 2010 Sri Lankan Presidential Election ===
Party	Divulapitiya		Gampaha Electoral District		Sri Lanka	
Party	Votes	%	Votes	%	Votes	%
UPFA	48,149	62.03%	718,716	61.66%	6,015,934	57.88%
NDF	28,518	36.74%	434,506	37.28%	4,173,185	40.15%
Other Parties (with < 1%)	957	1.23%	12,426	1.07%	204,494	1.97%
Valid Votes	77,624	99.39%	1,165,648	99.24%	10,393,613	99.03%
Rejected Votes	476	0.61%	8,960	0.76%	101,838	0.97%
Total Polled	78,100	78.30%	1,174,608	78.03%	10,495,451	66.70%
Registered Electors	99,742		1,505,363		15,734,587	

=== 2005 Sri Lankan Presidential Election ===
Party	Divulapitiya		Gampaha Electoral District		Sri Lanka	
Party	Votes	%	Votes	%	Votes	%
UPFA	39,347	52.39%	596,698	54.78%	4,887,152	50.29%
UNP	34,945	46.53%	481,764	44.23%	4,706,366	48.43%
Other Parties (with < 1%)	808	1.08%	10,815	0.99%	123,521	1.27%
Valid Votes	75,100	99.10%	1,089,277	98.94%	9,717,039	98.88%
Rejected Votes	680	0.90%	11,724	1.06%	109,869	1.12%
Total Polled	75,780	80.89%	1,101,001	79.17%	9,826,908	69.51%
Registered Electors	93,677		1,390,691		14,136,979	

=== 1999 Sri Lankan Presidential Election ===
Party	Divulapitiya		Gampaha Electoral District		Sri Lanka	
Party	Votes	%	Votes	%	Votes	%
PA	35,245	54.10%	532,796	56.58%	4,312,157	51.12%
UNP	27,007	41.46%	353,969	37.59%	3,602,748	42.71%
JVP	2,046	3.14%	40,472	4.30%	343,927	4.08%
Other Parties (with < 1%)	849	1.30%	14,382	1.53%	176,679	2.09%
Valid Votes	65,147	98.58%	941,619	97.84%	8,435,754	97.69%
Rejected Votes	941	1.42%	20,768	2.16%	199,536	2.31%
Total Polled	66,088	79.55%	962,387	77.12%	8,635,290	72.17%
Registered Electors	83,077		1,247,860		11,965,536	

=== 1994 Sri Lankan Presidential Election ===
Party	Divulapitiya		Gampaha Electoral District		Sri Lanka	
Party	Votes	%	Votes	%	Votes	%
PA	35,220	59.06%	550,654	64.74%	4,709,205	62.28%
UNP	23,749	39.82%	288,608	33.93%	2,715,283	35.91%
Other Parties (with < 1%)	668	1.12%	11,256	1.32%	137,040	1.81%
Valid Votes	59,637	98.62%	850,518	98.48%	7,561,526	98.03%
Rejected Votes	832	1.38%	13,137	1.52%	151,706	1.97%
Total Polled	60,469	78.43%	863,655	74.16%	7,713,232	69.12%
Registered Electors	77,104		1,164,625		11,158,880	

=== 1988 Sri Lankan Presidential Election ===
Party	Divulapitiya		Gampaha Electoral District		Sri Lanka	
Party	Votes	%	Votes	%	Votes	%
SLFP	25,857	49.06%	355,553	48.83%	2,289,857	44.95%
UNP	25,792	48.94%	350,092	48.08%	2,569,199	50.43%
SLMP	1,055	2.00%	22,467	3.09%	235,701	4.63%
Valid Votes	52,704	98.61%	728,112	98.63%	5,094,754	98.24%
Rejected Votes	742	1.39%	10,108	1.37%	91,499	1.76%
Total Polled	53,446	78.16%	738,220	74.93%	5,186,256	55.87%
Registered Electors	68,377		985,206		9,283,143	

=== 1982 Sri Lankan Presidential Election ===
Party	Divulapitiya		Gampaha Electoral District		Sri Lanka	
Party	Votes	%	Votes	%	Votes	%
UNP	25,974	50.63%	365,847	52.50%	3,450,815	52.93%
SLFP	23,447	45.70%	301,808	43.31%	2,546,348	39.05%
JVP	1,547	3.02%	23,701	3.40%	273,428	4.19%
Other Parties (with < 1%)	338	0.66%	5,491	0.79%	249,460	3.83%
Valid Votes	51,306	99.17%	696,847	99.15%	6,520,156	98.78%
Rejected Votes	432	0.83%	5,992	0.85%	80,470	1.22%
Total Polled	51,738	84.14%	702,839	82.70%	6,600,626	80.15%
Registered Electors	61,494		849,896		8,235,358	

== Parliamentary Election Results ==
=== Summary ===
Divulapitiya has matched the final country result 6 out of 7 times. Hence, Divulapitiya is a bellwether for parliamentary elections.

Year	Divulapitiya	Gampaha Electoral District	MAE %	Sri Lanka	MAE %
2015	UPFA	UNP	2.76%	UNP	2.90%
2010	UPFA	UPFA	1.43%	UPFA	2.85%
2004	UPFA	UPFA	1.13%	UPFA	3.29%
2001	UNP	UNP	1.80%	UNP	2.93%
2000	PA	PA	2.17%	PA	3.37%
1994	PA	PA	4.31%	PA	2.91%
1989	UNP	UNP	2.20%	UNP	5.33%
Matches/Mean MAE	6/7	7/7	2.26%	7/7	3.37%

=== 2015 Sri Lankan Parliamentary Election ===
Party	Divulapitiya		Gampaha Electoral District		Sri Lanka	
Party	Votes	%	Votes	%	Votes	%
UPFA	38,471	49.04%	549,958	44.96%	4,732,664	42.48%
UNP	35,725	45.54%	577,004	47.17%	5,098,916	45.77%
JVP	3,951	5.04%	87,880	7.18%	544,154	4.88%
Other Parties (with < 1%)	307	0.39%	8,332	0.68%	81,501	0.73%
Valid Votes	78,454	95.44%	1,223,174	95.51%	11,140,333	95.35%
Rejected Votes	3,707	4.51%	56,246	4.39%	516,926	4.42%
Total Polled	82,203	75.74%	1,280,647	78.21%	11,684,111	77.66%
Registered Electors	108,529		1,637,537		15,044,490	

=== 2010 Sri Lankan Parliamentary Election ===
Party	Divulapitiya		Gampaha Electoral District		Sri Lanka	
Party	Votes	%	Votes	%	Votes	%
UPFA	38,957	64.76%	589,476	63.40%	4,846,388	60.38%
UNP	18,026	29.96%	266,523	28.67%	2,357,057	29.37%
DNA	2,931	4.87%	69,747	7.50%	441,251	5.50%
Other Parties (with < 1%)	245	0.41%	3,985	0.43%	19,003	0.24%
Valid Votes	60,159	93.72%	929,731	94.83%	8,026,322	96.03%
Rejected Votes	4,017	6.26%	50,234	5.12%	581,465	6.96%
Total Polled	64,191	64.36%	980,467	65.06%	8,358,246	59.29%
Registered Electors	99,742		1,506,969		14,097,690	

=== 2004 Sri Lankan Parliamentary Election ===
Party	Divulapitiya		Gampaha Electoral District		Sri Lanka	
Party	Votes	%	Votes	%	Votes	%
UPFA	34,257	51.27%	509,963	51.52%	4,223,126	45.70%
UNP	26,267	39.31%	367,572	37.14%	3,486,792	37.73%
JHU	5,666	8.48%	102,516	10.36%	552,723	5.98%
Other Parties (with < 1%)	631	0.94%	9,691	0.98%	57,229	0.62%
Valid Votes	66,821	95.83%	989,742	95.96%	9,241,931	94.52%
Rejected Votes	2,884	4.14%	41,462	4.02%	534,452	5.47%
Total Polled	69,731	77.18%	1,031,464	77.72%	9,777,821	75.74%
Registered Electors	90,352		1,327,145		12,909,631	

=== 2001 Sri Lankan Parliamentary Election ===
Party	Divulapitiya		Gampaha Electoral District		Sri Lanka	
Party	Votes	%	Votes	%	Votes	%
UNP	31,434	46.50%	437,289	43.94%	4,086,026	45.62%
PA	29,656	43.87%	428,780	43.08%	3,330,815	37.19%
JVP	5,817	8.61%	113,990	11.45%	815,353	9.10%
Other Parties (with < 1%)	686	1.01%	15,171	1.52%	137,826	1.54%
Valid Votes	67,593	96.20%	995,230	96.30%	8,955,844	94.77%
Rejected Votes	2,672	3.80%	38,187	3.70%	494,009	5.23%
Total Polled	70,265	80.72%	1,033,417	80.36%	9,449,878	76.03%
Registered Electors	87,050		1,285,973		12,428,762	

=== 2000 Sri Lankan Parliamentary Election ===
Party	Divulapitiya		Gampaha Electoral District		Sri Lanka	
Party	Votes	%	Votes	%	Votes	%
PA	32,294	49.12%	470,018	48.87%	3,899,329	45.33%
UNP	28,894	43.95%	378,328	39.34%	3,451,765	40.12%
JVP	3,289	5.00%	73,110	7.60%	518,725	6.03%
SU	658	1.00%	20,297	2.11%	127,859	1.49%
Other Parties (with < 1%)	604	0.92%	19,956	2.08%	319,123	3.71%
Valid Votes	65,739	N/A	961,709	N/A	8,602,617	N/A

=== 1994 Sri Lankan Parliamentary Election ===
Party	Divulapitiya		Gampaha Electoral District		Sri Lanka	
Party	Votes	%	Votes	%	Votes	%
PA	32,951	52.62%	509,030	56.79%	3,887,805	48.94%
UNP	29,141	46.54%	375,631	41.91%	3,498,370	44.04%
Other Parties (with < 1%)	523	0.84%	11,627	1.30%	90,078	1.13%
Valid Votes	62,615	96.56%	896,288	96.39%	7,943,688	95.20%
Rejected Votes	2,228	3.44%	33,553	3.61%	400,395	4.80%
Total Polled	64,843	84.10%	929,841	79.65%	8,344,095	74.75%
Registered Electors	77,104		1,167,469		11,163,064	

=== 1989 Sri Lankan Parliamentary Election ===
Party	Divulapitiya		Gampaha Electoral District		Sri Lanka	
Party	Votes	%	Votes	%	Votes	%
UNP	27,430	52.95%	385,733	54.14%	2,838,005	50.71%
SLFP	23,286	44.95%	294,490	41.34%	1,785,369	31.90%
USA	850	1.64%	21,665	3.04%	141,983	2.54%
Other Parties (with < 1%)	233	0.45%	10,549	1.48%	67,723	1.21%
Valid Votes	51,799	95.33%	712,437	95.64%	5,596,468	93.87%
Rejected Votes	2,536	4.67%	32,497	4.36%	365,563	6.13%
Total Polled	54,335	80.91%	744,934	76.82%	5,962,031	63.60%
Registered Electors	67,159		969,658		9,374,164	

== Demographics ==
=== Ethnicity ===
The Divulapitiya Polling Division has a Sinhalese majority (99.0%) . In comparison, the Gampaha Electoral District (which contains the Divulapitiya Polling Division) has a Sinhalese majority (90.5%)

Ethnicity in Divulapitiya
1. Sinhalese (99.0%)
2. Other (1.00%)

=== Religion ===
The Divulapitiya Polling Division has a Buddhist majority (85.1%) and a significant Roman Catholic population (13.4%) . In comparison, the Gampaha Electoral District (which contains the Divulapitiya Polling Division) has a Buddhist majority (71.3%) and a significant Roman Catholic population (19.5%)

Religion in Divulapitiya
1. Buddhist (85.1%)
2. Roman Catholic (13.4%)
3. Other (1.50%)
