= Mawathagama Polling Division =

Mawathagama
- Polling Division
- Coordinates: 7.419356°N 80.449840°E
- Country: Sri Lanka
- Province: North Western Province, Sri Lanka
- Electoral District: Kurunegala Electoral District

Area
  - Total: 111.48 km^{2} (43.04 sq mi)

Population (2012)
  - Total: 64,904
  - Density: 582/km^{2} (1,510/sq mi)
- ISO 3166 code: EC-15M

The Mawathagama Polling Division is a Polling Division in the Kurunegala Electoral District, in the North Western Province, Sri Lanka.

== Presidential Election Results ==
=== Summary ===
The winner of Mawathagama has matched the final country result 8 out of 8 times, and as a result, some consider Mawathagama to be a Bellwether for Presidential Elections.

Year	Mawathagama	Kurunegala Electoral District	MAE %	Sri Lanka	MAE %
2019	SLPP	SLPP	2.55%	SLPP	2.52%
2015	NDF	UPFA	5.50%	NDF	0.16%
2010	UPFA	UPFA	3.81%	UPFA	1.12%
2005	UPFA	UPFA	2.03%	UPFA	0.20%
1999	PA	PA	1.83%	PA	2.51%
1994	PA	PA	2.42%	PA	0.60%
1988	UNP	UNP	1.73%	UNP	1.72%
1982	UNP	UNP	0.73%	UNP	1.89%
Matches/Mean MAE	8/8	7/8	2.57%	8/8	1.34%

=== 2019 Sri Lankan Presidential Election ===
Party	Mawathagama		Kurunegala Electoral District		Sri Lanka	
Party	Votes	%	Votes	%	Votes	%
SLPP	41,961	55.14%	652,278	57.90%	6,924,255	52.25%
NDF	30,124	39.58%	416,961	37.01%	5,564,239	41.99%
NMPP	2,468	3.24%	36,178	3.21%	418,553	3.16%
Other Parties (with < 1%)	1,547	2.03%	21,193	1.88%	345,452	2.61%
Valid Votes	76,100	99.24%	1,126,610	99.25%	13,252,499	98.99%
Rejected Votes	581	0.76%	8,522	0.75%	135,452	1.01%
Total Polled	76,681	83.87%	1,135,132	85.24%	13,387,951	83.71%
Registered Electors	91,431		1,331,705		15,992,568	

=== 2015 Sri Lankan Presidential Election ===
Party	Mawathagama		Kurunegala Electoral District		Sri Lanka	
Party	Votes	%	Votes	%	Votes	%
NDF	35,591	51.22%	476,602	45.76%	6,217,162	51.28%
UPFA	33,243	47.84%	556,868	53.46%	5,768,090	47.58%
Other Parties (with < 1%)	647	0.93%	8,154	0.78%	138,200	1.14%
Valid Votes	69,481	98.81%	1,041,624	99.12%	12,123,452	98.85%
Rejected Votes	834	1.19%	9,285	0.88%	140,925	1.15%
Total Polled	70,315	77.54%	1,050,909	78.82%	12,264,377	78.69%
Registered Electors	90,682		1,333,377		15,585,942	

=== 2010 Sri Lankan Presidential Election ===
Party	Mawathagama		Kurunegala Electoral District		Sri Lanka	
Party	Votes	%	Votes	%	Votes	%
UPFA	36,237	59.13%	582,784	63.08%	6,015,934	57.88%
NDF	23,999	39.16%	327,594	35.46%	4,173,185	40.15%
Other Parties (with < 1%)	1,050	1.71%	13,515	1.46%	204,494	1.97%
Valid Votes	61,286	99.26%	923,893	99.29%	10,393,613	99.03%
Rejected Votes	458	0.74%	6,644	0.71%	101,838	0.97%
Total Polled	61,744	74.70%	930,537	75.59%	10,495,451	66.70%
Registered Electors	82,656		1,230,966		15,734,587	

=== 2005 Sri Lankan Presidential Election ===
Party	Mawathagama		Kurunegala Electoral District		Sri Lanka	
Party	Votes	%	Votes	%	Votes	%
UPFA	29,513	50.14%	468,507	52.26%	4,887,152	50.29%
UNP	28,658	48.68%	418,809	46.72%	4,706,366	48.43%
Other Parties (with < 1%)	696	1.18%	9,181	1.02%	123,521	1.27%
Valid Votes	58,867	98.98%	896,497	99.07%	9,717,039	98.88%
Rejected Votes	607	1.02%	8,458	0.93%	109,869	1.12%
Total Polled	59,474	76.43%	904,955	77.87%	9,826,908	69.51%
Registered Electors	77,819		1,162,099		14,136,979	

=== 1999 Sri Lankan Presidential Election ===
Party	Mawathagama		Kurunegala Electoral District		Sri Lanka	
Party	Votes	%	Votes	%	Votes	%
PA	23,463	48.52%	377,483	50.77%	4,312,157	51.12%
UNP	21,972	45.44%	326,327	43.89%	3,602,748	42.71%
JVP	1,838	3.80%	27,354	3.68%	343,927	4.08%
Other Parties (with < 1%)	1,080	2.23%	12,355	1.66%	176,679	2.09%
Valid Votes	48,353	97.98%	743,519	97.99%	8,435,754	97.69%
Rejected Votes	995	2.02%	15,272	2.01%	199,536	2.31%
Total Polled	49,348	73.32%	758,791	75.83%	8,635,290	72.17%
Registered Electors	67,307		1,000,624		11,965,536	

=== 1994 Sri Lankan Presidential Election ===
Party	Mawathagama		Kurunegala Electoral District		Sri Lanka	
Party	Votes	%	Votes	%	Votes	%
PA	28,057	61.70%	403,838	59.36%	4,709,205	62.28%
UNP	16,635	36.58%	266,740	39.21%	2,715,283	35.91%
Other Parties (with < 1%)	784	1.72%	9,766	1.44%	137,040	1.81%
Valid Votes	45,476	98.21%	680,344	98.48%	7,561,526	98.03%
Rejected Votes	831	1.79%	10,511	1.52%	151,706	1.97%
Total Polled	46,307	76.38%	690,855	76.97%	7,713,232	69.12%
Registered Electors	60,627		897,539		11,158,880	

=== 1988 Sri Lankan Presidential Election ===
Party	Mawathagama		Kurunegala Electoral District		Sri Lanka	
Party	Votes	%	Votes	%	Votes	%
UNP	20,429	53.13%	198,662	51.12%	2,569,199	50.43%
SLFP	17,465	45.42%	182,220	46.89%	2,289,857	44.95%
SLMP	557	1.45%	7,717	1.99%	235,701	4.63%
Valid Votes	38,451	99.02%	388,599	98.91%	5,094,754	98.24%
Rejected Votes	380	0.98%	4,281	1.09%	91,499	1.76%
Total Polled	38,831	73.52%	392,880	53.49%	5,186,256	55.87%
Registered Electors	52,815		734,453		9,283,143	

=== 1982 Sri Lankan Presidential Election ===
Party	Mawathagama		Kurunegala Electoral District		Sri Lanka	
Party	Votes	%	Votes	%	Votes	%
UNP	23,127	56.32%	345,769	55.77%	3,450,815	52.93%
SLFP	16,033	39.04%	248,479	40.08%	2,546,348	39.05%
JVP	1,580	3.85%	21,835	3.52%	273,428	4.19%
Other Parties (with < 1%)	324	0.79%	3,895	0.63%	249,460	3.83%
Valid Votes	41,064	98.95%	619,978	99.13%	6,520,156	98.78%
Rejected Votes	435	1.05%	5,431	0.87%	80,470	1.22%
Total Polled	41,499	85.53%	625,409	86.00%	6,600,626	80.15%
Registered Electors	48,522		727,202		8,235,358	

== Parliamentary Election Results ==
=== Summary ===
Year	Mawathagama	Kurunegala Electoral District	MAE %	Sri Lanka	MAE %
2015	UNP	UPFA	4.07%	UNP	2.94%
2010	UPFA	UPFA	0.97%	UPFA	2.45%
2004	UPFA	UPFA	2.79%	UPFA	3.78%
2001	UNP	UNP	2.51%	UNP	3.47%
2000	UNP	PA	4.53%	PA	3.43%
1994	PA	PA	0.34%	PA	2.55%
1989	UNP	UNP	2.87%	UNP	5.60%
Matches/Mean MAE	6/7	6/7	2.58%	7/7	3.46%

=== 2015 Sri Lankan Parliamentary Election ===
Party	Mawathagama		Kurunegala Electoral District		Sri Lanka	
Party	Votes	%	Votes	%	Votes	%
UNP	32,160	49.96%	441,275	45.87%	5,098,916	45.77%
UPFA	28,870	44.85%	474,124	49.29%	4,732,664	42.48%
JVP	2,927	4.55%	41,077	4.27%	544,154	4.88%
Other Parties (with < 1%)	414	0.64%	5,496	0.57%	83,041	0.75%
Valid Votes	64,371	94.71%	961,972	95.39%	11,140,333	95.35%
Rejected Votes	3,563	5.24%	46,036	4.56%	516,926	4.42%
Total Polled	67,965	74.95%	1,008,459	79.63%	11,684,111	77.66%
Registered Electors	90,682		1,266,443		15,044,490	

=== 2010 Sri Lankan Parliamentary Election ===
Party	Mawathagama		Kurunegala Electoral District		Sri Lanka	
Party	Votes	%	Votes	%	Votes	%
UPFA	28,106	62.78%	429,316	63.91%	4,846,388	60.38%
UNP	14,569	32.54%	213,713	31.81%	2,357,057	29.37%
DNA	1,945	4.34%	26,440	3.94%	441,251	5.50%
Other Parties (with < 1%)	147	0.33%	2,288	0.34%	34,779	0.43%
Valid Votes	44,767	92.06%	671,757	92.58%	8,026,322	96.03%
Rejected Votes	3,806	7.83%	53,130	7.32%	581,465	6.96%
Total Polled	48,627	58.83%	725,566	59.08%	8,358,246	59.29%
Registered Electors	82,656		1,228,044		14,097,690	

=== 2004 Sri Lankan Parliamentary Election ===
Party	Mawathagama		Kurunegala Electoral District		Sri Lanka	
Party	Votes	%	Votes	%	Votes	%
UPFA	24,974	48.17%	412,157	51.95%	4,223,126	45.70%
UNP	23,158	44.67%	340,768	42.95%	3,486,792	37.73%
JHU	3,391	6.54%	37,459	4.72%	552,723	5.98%
Other Parties (with < 1%)	320	0.62%	2,976	0.38%	64,640	0.70%
Valid Votes	51,843	94.93%	793,360	95.14%	9,241,931	94.52%
Rejected Votes	2,753	5.04%	40,261	4.83%	534,452	5.47%
Total Polled	54,614	72.56%	833,908	76.54%	9,777,821	75.74%
Registered Electors	75,264		1,089,482		12,909,631	

=== 2001 Sri Lankan Parliamentary Election ===
Party	Mawathagama		Kurunegala Electoral District		Sri Lanka	
Party	Votes	%	Votes	%	Votes	%
UNP	26,507	51.24%	382,768	48.59%	4,086,026	45.62%
PA	20,365	39.37%	332,775	42.24%	3,330,815	37.19%
JVP	4,134	7.99%	63,652	8.08%	815,353	9.10%
Other Parties (with < 1%)	724	1.40%	8,533	1.08%	133,770	1.49%
Valid Votes	51,730	95.45%	787,728	95.35%	8,955,844	94.77%
Rejected Votes	2,467	4.55%	38,451	4.65%	494,009	5.23%
Total Polled	54,197	75.25%	826,179	78.98%	9,449,878	76.03%
Registered Electors	72,027		1,046,102		12,428,762	

=== 2000 Sri Lankan Parliamentary Election ===
Party	Mawathagama		Kurunegala Electoral District		Sri Lanka	
Party	Votes	%	Votes	%	Votes	%
UNP	22,502	45.90%	308,106	41.86%	3,451,765	40.12%
PA	21,075	42.99%	358,794	48.75%	3,899,329	45.33%
JVP	2,760	5.63%	40,780	5.54%	518,725	6.03%
NUA	1,574	3.21%	11,927	1.62%	185,593	2.16%
Other Parties (with < 1%)	1,111	2.27%	16,421	2.23%	221,514	2.57%
Valid Votes	49,022	N/A	736,028	N/A	8,602,617	N/A

=== 1994 Sri Lankan Parliamentary Election ===
Party	Mawathagama		Kurunegala Electoral District		Sri Lanka	
Party	Votes	%	Votes	%	Votes	%
PA	23,746	51.35%	366,856	51.87%	3,887,805	48.94%
UNP	21,805	47.15%	332,547	47.02%	3,498,370	44.04%
SLPF	491	1.06%	4,990	0.71%	90,078	1.13%
Other Parties (with < 1%)	204	0.44%	2,886	0.41%	68,538	0.86%
Valid Votes	46,246	96.35%	707,279	95.92%	7,943,688	95.20%
Rejected Votes	1,752	3.65%	30,071	4.08%	400,395	4.80%
Total Polled	47,998	79.17%	737,350	82.15%	8,344,095	74.75%
Registered Electors	60,627		897,580		11,163,064	

=== 1989 Sri Lankan Parliamentary Election ===
Party	Mawathagama		Kurunegala Electoral District		Sri Lanka	
Party	Votes	%	Votes	%	Votes	%
UNP	22,899	61.12%	314,724	58.51%	2,838,005	50.71%
SLFP	12,270	32.75%	195,526	36.35%	1,785,369	31.90%
ELJP	1,316	3.51%	13,759	2.56%	67,723	1.21%
USA	854	2.28%	11,059	2.06%	141,983	2.54%
Other Parties (with < 1%)	128	0.34%	2,848	0.53%	90,480	1.62%
Valid Votes	37,467	93.53%	537,916	94.02%	5,596,468	93.87%
Rejected Votes	2,592	6.47%	34,212	5.98%	365,563	6.13%
Total Polled	40,059	77.13%	572,128	72.88%	5,962,031	63.60%
Registered Electors	51,935		784,991		9,374,164	

== Demographics ==
=== Ethnicity ===
The Mawathagama Polling Division has a Sinhalese majority (83.1%) and a significant Moor population (11.6%) . In comparison, the Kurunegala Electoral District (which contains the Mawathagama Polling Division) has a Sinhalese majority (91.4%)

Ethnicity in Mawathagama
1. Sinhalese (83.1%)
2. Moor (11.6%)
3. Sri Lankan Tamil (4.70%)
4. Other (0.60%)

=== Religion ===
The Mawathagama Polling Division has a Buddhist majority (81.1%) and a significant Muslim population (11.9%) . In comparison, the Kurunegala Electoral District (which contains the Mawathagama Polling Division) has a Buddhist majority (88.5%)

Religion in Mawathagama
1. Buddhist (81.1%)
2. Muslim (11.9%)
3. Hindu (4.20%)
4. Other Christian (1.50%)
5. Roman Catholic (1.40%)
6. Other (0.00%)
