= Ratnapura Polling Division =

Ratnapura
- Polling Division
- Interactive map of Ratnapura
- Coordinates: 6.721079°N 80.462737°E
- Country: Sri Lanka
- Province: Sabaragamuwa Province, Sri Lanka
- Electoral District: Ratnapura Electoral District

Area
  - Total: 332.69 km^{2} (128.45 sq mi)

Population (2012)
  - Total: 120,212
  - Density: 361/km^{2} (930/sq mi)
- ISO 3166 code: EC-21B

The Ratnapura Polling Division is a Polling Division in the Ratnapura Electoral District, in the Sabaragamuwa Province, Sri Lanka.

== Presidential Election Results ==
=== Summary ===
The winner of Ratnapura has matched the final country result 5 out of 8 times. Hence, Ratnapura can be considered a weak bellwether for presidential elections.

Year	Ratnapura	Ratnapura Electoral District	MAE %	Sri Lanka	MAE %
2019	SLPP	SLPP	0.54%	SLPP	7.32%
2015	UPFA	UPFA	0.62%	NDF	7.48%
2010	UPFA	UPFA	0.21%	UPFA	5.74%
2005	UPFA	UPFA	0.06%	UPFA	2.71%
1999	PA	PA	1.59%	PA	2.35%
1994	PA	PA	0.57%	PA	3.57%
1988	SLFP	UNP	4.35%	UNP	4.06%
1982	SLFP	UNP	3.78%	UNP	6.74%
Matches/Mean MAE	5/8	7/8	1.47%	8/8	5.00%

=== 2019 Sri Lankan Presidential Election ===
Party	Ratnapura		Ratnapura Electoral District		Sri Lanka	
Party	Votes	%	Votes	%	Votes	%
SLPP	64,809	60.58%	448,044	59.93%	6,924,255	52.25%
NDF	37,400	34.96%	264,503	35.38%	5,564,239	41.99%
NMPP	2,733	2.55%	18,887	2.53%	418,553	3.16%
Other Parties (with < 1%)	2,044	1.91%	16,237	2.17%	345,452	2.61%
Valid Votes	106,986	99.24%	747,671	99.22%	13,252,499	98.99%
Rejected Votes	818	0.76%	5,853	0.78%	135,452	1.01%
Total Polled	107,804	86.96%	753,524	87.11%	13,387,951	83.71%
Registered Electors	123,967		864,979		15,992,568	

=== 2015 Sri Lankan Presidential Election ===
Party	Ratnapura		Ratnapura Electoral District		Sri Lanka	
Party	Votes	%	Votes	%	Votes	%
UPFA	54,989	55.24%	379,053	55.74%	5,768,090	47.58%
NDF	43,608	43.80%	292,514	43.01%	6,217,162	51.28%
Other Parties (with < 1%)	955	0.96%	8,517	1.25%	138,200	1.14%
Valid Votes	99,552	98.93%	680,084	98.89%	12,123,452	98.85%
Rejected Votes	1,074	1.07%	7,656	1.11%	140,925	1.15%
Total Polled	100,626	83.09%	687,740	82.69%	12,264,377	78.69%
Registered Electors	121,108		831,712		15,585,942	

=== 2010 Sri Lankan Presidential Election ===
Party	Ratnapura		Ratnapura Electoral District		Sri Lanka	
Party	Votes	%	Votes	%	Votes	%
UPFA	55,225	63.95%	377,734	63.76%	6,015,934	57.88%
NDF	29,891	34.61%	203,566	34.36%	4,173,185	40.15%
Other Parties (with < 1%)	1,240	1.44%	11,126	1.88%	204,494	1.97%
Valid Votes	86,356	99.34%	592,426	99.26%	10,393,613	99.03%
Rejected Votes	575	0.66%	4,430	0.74%	101,838	0.97%
Total Polled	86,931	80.40%	596,856	79.75%	10,495,451	66.70%
Registered Electors	108,122		748,404		15,734,587	

=== 2005 Sri Lankan Presidential Election ===
Party	Ratnapura		Ratnapura Electoral District		Sri Lanka	
Party	Votes	%	Votes	%	Votes	%
UPFA	43,251	53.02%	294,260	53.01%	4,887,152	50.29%
UNP	37,253	45.67%	252,838	45.55%	4,706,366	48.43%
Other Parties (with < 1%)	1,068	1.31%	7,976	1.44%	123,521	1.27%
Valid Votes	81,572	99.13%	555,074	99.02%	9,717,039	98.88%
Rejected Votes	720	0.87%	5,510	0.98%	109,869	1.12%
Total Polled	82,292	82.10%	560,584	82.57%	9,826,908	69.51%
Registered Electors	100,230		678,909		14,136,979	

=== 1999 Sri Lankan Presidential Election ===
Party	Ratnapura		Ratnapura Electoral District		Sri Lanka	
Party	Votes	%	Votes	%	Votes	%
PA	38,665	54.29%	250,409	52.13%	4,312,157	51.12%
UNP	29,298	41.14%	202,621	42.18%	3,602,748	42.71%
JVP	1,914	2.69%	16,482	3.43%	343,927	4.08%
Other Parties (with < 1%)	1,338	1.88%	10,852	2.26%	176,679	2.09%
Valid Votes	71,215	98.25%	480,364	98.15%	8,435,754	97.69%
Rejected Votes	1,267	1.75%	9,038	1.85%	199,536	2.31%
Total Polled	72,482	80.97%	489,402	81.27%	8,635,290	72.17%
Registered Electors	89,518		602,172		11,965,536	

=== 1994 Sri Lankan Presidential Election ===
Party	Ratnapura		Ratnapura Electoral District		Sri Lanka	
Party	Votes	%	Votes	%	Votes	%
PA	38,221	58.76%	257,265	58.07%	4,709,205	62.28%
UNP	25,858	39.76%	177,924	40.16%	2,715,283	35.91%
Other Parties (with < 1%)	963	1.48%	7,842	1.77%	137,040	1.81%
Valid Votes	65,042	98.49%	443,031	98.31%	7,561,526	98.03%
Rejected Votes	996	1.51%	7,595	1.69%	151,706	1.97%
Total Polled	66,038	79.10%	450,626	80.02%	7,713,232	69.12%
Registered Electors	83,492		563,174		11,158,880	

=== 1988 Sri Lankan Presidential Election ===
Party	Ratnapura		Ratnapura Electoral District		Sri Lanka	
Party	Votes	%	Votes	%	Votes	%
SLFP	27,658	50.15%	159,879	45.81%	2,289,857	44.95%
UNP	26,029	47.20%	180,622	51.75%	2,569,199	50.43%
SLMP	1,460	2.65%	8,516	2.44%	235,701	4.63%
Valid Votes	55,147	98.91%	349,017	98.84%	5,094,754	98.24%
Rejected Votes	608	1.09%	4,113	1.16%	91,499	1.76%
Total Polled	55,755	79.60%	353,130	76.64%	5,186,256	55.87%
Registered Electors	70,048		460,735		9,283,143	

=== 1982 Sri Lankan Presidential Election ===
Party	Ratnapura		Ratnapura Electoral District		Sri Lanka	
Party	Votes	%	Votes	%	Votes	%
SLFP	25,402	49.37%	152,506	44.13%	2,546,348	39.05%
UNP	24,765	48.13%	175,903	50.90%	3,450,815	52.93%
JVP	860	1.67%	11,283	3.26%	273,428	4.19%
Other Parties (with < 1%)	426	0.83%	5,912	1.71%	249,460	3.83%
Valid Votes	51,453	99.04%	345,604	99.02%	6,520,156	98.78%
Rejected Votes	499	0.96%	3,407	0.98%	80,470	1.22%
Total Polled	51,952	83.81%	349,011	85.91%	6,600,626	80.15%
Registered Electors	61,986		406,275		8,235,358	

== Parliamentary Election Results ==
=== Summary ===
The winner of Ratnapura has matched the final country result 6 out of 7 times. Hence, Ratnapura can be considered a strong bellwether for parliamentary elections.

Year	Ratnapura	Ratnapura Electoral District	MAE %	Sri Lanka	MAE %
2015	UPFA	UPFA	0.47%	UNP	4.58%
2010	UPFA	UPFA	1.76%	UPFA	4.31%
2004	UPFA	UPFA	1.77%	UPFA	3.61%
2001	UNP	UNP	1.05%	UNP	3.11%
2000	PA	PA	0.57%	PA	3.67%
1994	PA	PA	1.12%	PA	2.73%
1989	UNP	UNP	8.93%	UNP	5.52%
Matches/Mean MAE	6/7	6/7	2.24%	7/7	3.93%

=== 2015 Sri Lankan Parliamentary Election ===
Party	Ratnapura		Ratnapura Electoral District		Sri Lanka	
Party	Votes	%	Votes	%	Votes	%
UPFA	47,596	51.72%	323,636	51.21%	4,732,664	42.48%
UNP	40,943	44.49%	284,117	44.96%	5,098,916	45.77%
JVP	3,111	3.38%	21,525	3.41%	544,154	4.88%
Other Parties (with < 1%)	381	0.41%	2,720	0.43%	83,333	0.75%
Valid Votes	92,031	97.16%	631,998	96.46%	11,140,333	95.35%
Rejected Votes	2,677	2.83%	23,026	3.51%	516,926	4.42%
Total Polled	94,725	78.22%	655,222	80.88%	11,684,111	77.66%
Registered Electors	121,108		810,082		15,044,490	

=== 2010 Sri Lankan Parliamentary Election ===
Party	Ratnapura		Ratnapura Electoral District		Sri Lanka	
Party	Votes	%	Votes	%	Votes	%
UPFA	42,637	67.02%	305,327	68.87%	4,846,388	60.38%
UNP	19,013	29.89%	125,076	28.21%	2,357,057	29.37%
DNA	1,755	2.76%	11,053	2.49%	441,251	5.50%
Other Parties (with < 1%)	215	0.34%	1,853	0.42%	35,498	0.44%
Valid Votes	63,620	92.41%	443,309	92.28%	8,026,322	96.03%
Rejected Votes	5,215	7.58%	37,022	7.71%	581,465	6.96%
Total Polled	68,842	63.67%	480,395	64.02%	8,358,246	59.29%
Registered Electors	108,122		750,416		14,097,690	

=== 2004 Sri Lankan Parliamentary Election ===
Party	Ratnapura		Ratnapura Electoral District		Sri Lanka	
Party	Votes	%	Votes	%	Votes	%
UPFA	37,386	51.06%	261,450	53.14%	4,223,126	45.70%
UNP	29,670	40.53%	205,490	41.77%	3,486,792	37.73%
JHU	5,605	7.66%	20,801	4.23%	552,723	5.98%
Other Parties (with < 1%)	552	0.75%	4,262	0.87%	58,082	0.63%
Valid Votes	73,213	94.91%	492,003	94.55%	9,241,931	94.52%
Rejected Votes	3,926	5.09%	28,346	5.45%	534,452	5.47%
Total Polled	77,139	79.23%	520,349	80.42%	9,777,821	75.74%
Registered Electors	97,357		647,035		12,909,631	

=== 2001 Sri Lankan Parliamentary Election ===
Party	Ratnapura		Ratnapura Electoral District		Sri Lanka	
Party	Votes	%	Votes	%	Votes	%
UNP	33,702	45.73%	227,202	46.41%	4,086,026	45.62%
PA	33,136	44.96%	212,794	43.46%	3,330,815	37.19%
JVP	5,334	7.24%	40,377	8.25%	815,353	9.10%
Other Parties (with < 1%)	1,525	2.07%	9,205	1.88%	131,990	1.47%
Valid Votes	73,697	95.27%	489,578	94.14%	8,955,844	94.77%
Rejected Votes	3,657	4.73%	30,483	5.86%	494,009	5.23%
Total Polled	77,354	82.05%	520,061	83.41%	9,449,878	76.03%
Registered Electors	94,271		623,506		12,428,762	

=== 2000 Sri Lankan Parliamentary Election ===
Party	Ratnapura		Ratnapura Electoral District		Sri Lanka	
Party	Votes	%	Votes	%	Votes	%
PA	36,981	51.49%	244,142	50.63%	3,899,329	45.33%
UNP	30,189	42.04%	204,017	42.30%	3,451,765	40.12%
JVP	3,165	4.41%	22,222	4.61%	518,725	6.03%
Other Parties (with < 1%)	1,482	2.06%	11,873	2.46%	239,421	2.78%
Valid Votes	71,817	N/A	482,254	N/A	8,602,617	N/A

=== 1994 Sri Lankan Parliamentary Election ===
Party	Ratnapura		Ratnapura Electoral District		Sri Lanka	
Party	Votes	%	Votes	%	Votes	%
PA	35,045	51.95%	233,687	50.77%	3,887,805	48.94%
UNP	31,619	46.87%	220,750	47.96%	3,498,370	44.04%
Other Parties (with < 1%)	794	1.18%	5,848	1.27%	223,848	2.82%
Valid Votes	67,458	95.35%	460,285	95.12%	7,943,688	95.20%
Rejected Votes	3,291	4.65%	23,611	4.88%	400,395	4.80%
Total Polled	70,749	84.74%	483,890	85.77%	8,344,095	74.75%
Registered Electors	83,492		564,194		11,163,064	

=== 1989 Sri Lankan Parliamentary Election ===
Party	Ratnapura		Ratnapura Electoral District		Sri Lanka	
Party	Votes	%	Votes	%	Votes	%
UNP	26,289	49.62%	196,323	57.89%	2,838,005	50.71%
SLFP	25,112	47.40%	123,360	36.38%	1,785,369	31.90%
USP	1,359	2.57%	17,323	5.11%	17,323	0.31%
Other Parties (with < 1%)	219	0.41%	2,116	0.62%	68,609	1.23%
Valid Votes	52,979	94.90%	339,122	94.37%	5,596,468	93.87%
Rejected Votes	2,847	5.10%	20,248	5.63%	365,563	6.13%
Total Polled	55,826	81.27%	359,370	78.60%	5,962,031	63.60%
Registered Electors	68,694		457,224		9,374,164	

== Demographics ==
=== Ethnicity ===
The Ratnapura Polling Division has a Sinhalese majority (78.9%) . In comparison, the Ratnapura Electoral District (which contains the Ratnapura Polling Division) has a Sinhalese majority (87.1%)

Ethnicity in Ratnapura
1. Sinhalese (78.9%)
2. Sri Lankan Tamil (9.80%)
3. Indian Tamil (6.30%)
4. Moor (4.80%)
5. Other (0.20%)

=== Religion ===
The Ratnapura Polling Division has a Buddhist majority (78.2%) and a significant Hindu population (14.0%) . In comparison, the Ratnapura Electoral District (which contains the Ratnapura Polling Division) has a Buddhist majority (86.7%)

Religion in Ratnapura
1. Buddhist (78.2%)
2. Hindu (14.0%)
3. Muslim (5.30%)
4. Roman Catholic (1.50%)
5. Other Christian (1.00%)
6. Other (0.00%)
