= Hiriyala Polling Division =

Hiriyala
- Polling Division
- Coordinates: 7.646873°N 80.435408°E
- Country: Sri Lanka
- Province: North Western Province, Sri Lanka
- Electoral District: Kurunegala Electoral District

Area
  - Total: 376.12 km^{2} (145.22 sq mi)

Population (2012)
  - Total: 125,446
  - Density: 334/km^{2} (870/sq mi)
- ISO 3166 code: EC-15D

The Hiriyala Polling Division is a Polling Division in the Kurunegala Electoral District, in the North Western Province, Sri Lanka.

== Presidential Election Results ==
=== Summary ===
The winner of Hiriyala has matched the final country result 5 out of 8 times. Hence, Hiriyala is a Weak Bellwether for Presidential Elections.

Year	Hiriyala	Kurunegala Electoral District	MAE %	Sri Lanka	MAE %
2019	SLPP	SLPP	0.41%	SLPP	4.64%
2015	UPFA	UPFA	0.71%	NDF	4.93%
2010	UPFA	UPFA	1.11%	UPFA	6.00%
2005	UNP	UPFA	3.24%	UPFA	1.41%
1999	UNP	PA	3.50%	PA	4.14%
1994	PA	PA	2.77%	PA	5.77%
1988	UNP	UNP	7.27%	UNP	6.66%
1982	UNP	UNP	5.63%	UNP	6.61%
Matches/Mean MAE	5/8	7/8	3.08%	8/8	5.02%

=== 2019 Sri Lankan Presidential Election ===
Party	Hiriyala		Kurunegala Electoral District		Sri Lanka	
Party	Votes	%	Votes	%	Votes	%
SLPP	46,443	57.44%	652,278	57.90%	6,924,255	52.25%
NDF	30,232	37.39%	416,961	37.01%	5,564,239	41.99%
NMPP	2,538	3.14%	36,178	3.21%	418,553	3.16%
Other Parties (with < 1%)	1,648	2.04%	21,193	1.88%	345,452	2.61%
Valid Votes	80,861	99.28%	1,126,610	99.25%	13,252,499	98.99%
Rejected Votes	590	0.72%	8,522	0.75%	135,452	1.01%
Total Polled	81,451	83.58%	1,135,132	85.24%	13,387,951	83.71%
Registered Electors	97,456		1,331,705		15,992,568	

=== 2015 Sri Lankan Presidential Election ===
Party	Hiriyala		Kurunegala Electoral District		Sri Lanka	
Party	Votes	%	Votes	%	Votes	%
UPFA	38,538	52.68%	556,868	53.46%	5,768,090	47.58%
NDF	33,944	46.40%	476,602	45.76%	6,217,162	51.28%
Other Parties (with < 1%)	666	0.91%	8,154	0.78%	138,200	1.14%
Valid Votes	73,148	98.86%	1,041,624	99.12%	12,123,452	98.85%
Rejected Votes	847	1.14%	9,285	0.88%	140,925	1.15%
Total Polled	73,995	75.59%	1,050,909	78.82%	12,264,377	78.69%
Registered Electors	97,886		1,333,377		15,585,942	

=== 2010 Sri Lankan Presidential Election ===
Party	Hiriyala		Kurunegala Electoral District		Sri Lanka	
Party	Votes	%	Votes	%	Votes	%
UPFA	42,240	64.14%	582,784	63.08%	6,015,934	57.88%
NDF	22,538	34.22%	327,594	35.46%	4,173,185	40.15%
Other Parties (with < 1%)	1,075	1.63%	13,515	1.46%	204,494	1.97%
Valid Votes	65,853	99.17%	923,893	99.29%	10,393,613	99.03%
Rejected Votes	548	0.83%	6,644	0.71%	101,838	0.97%
Total Polled	66,401	72.06%	930,537	75.59%	10,495,451	66.70%
Registered Electors	92,150		1,230,966		15,734,587	

=== 2005 Sri Lankan Presidential Election ===
Party	Hiriyala		Kurunegala Electoral District		Sri Lanka	
Party	Votes	%	Votes	%	Votes	%
UNP	31,412	49.94%	418,809	46.72%	4,706,366	48.43%
UPFA	30,785	48.94%	468,507	52.26%	4,887,152	50.29%
Other Parties (with < 1%)	703	1.12%	9,181	1.02%	123,521	1.27%
Valid Votes	62,900	98.75%	896,497	99.07%	9,717,039	98.88%
Rejected Votes	793	1.25%	8,458	0.93%	109,869	1.12%
Total Polled	63,693	73.97%	904,955	77.87%	9,826,908	69.51%
Registered Electors	86,112		1,162,099		14,136,979	

=== 1999 Sri Lankan Presidential Election ===
Party	Hiriyala		Kurunegala Electoral District		Sri Lanka	
Party	Votes	%	Votes	%	Votes	%
UNP	24,589	47.17%	326,327	43.89%	3,602,748	42.71%
PA	24,366	46.74%	377,483	50.77%	4,312,157	51.12%
JVP	2,101	4.03%	27,354	3.68%	343,927	4.08%
Other Parties (with < 1%)	1,073	2.06%	12,355	1.66%	176,679	2.09%
Valid Votes	52,129	97.14%	743,519	97.99%	8,435,754	97.69%
Rejected Votes	1,535	2.86%	15,272	2.01%	199,536	2.31%
Total Polled	53,664	71.90%	758,791	75.83%	8,635,290	72.17%
Registered Electors	74,632		1,000,624		11,965,536	

=== 1994 Sri Lankan Presidential Election ===
Party	Hiriyala		Kurunegala Electoral District		Sri Lanka	
Party	Votes	%	Votes	%	Votes	%
PA	28,159	56.44%	403,838	59.36%	4,709,205	62.28%
UNP	20,880	41.85%	266,740	39.21%	2,715,283	35.91%
Other Parties (with < 1%)	852	1.71%	9,766	1.44%	137,040	1.81%
Valid Votes	49,891	98.19%	680,344	98.48%	7,561,526	98.03%
Rejected Votes	919	1.81%	10,511	1.52%	151,706	1.97%
Total Polled	50,810	75.63%	690,855	76.97%	7,713,232	69.12%
Registered Electors	67,182		897,539		11,158,880	

=== 1988 Sri Lankan Presidential Election ===
Party	Hiriyala		Kurunegala Electoral District		Sri Lanka	
Party	Votes	%	Votes	%	Votes	%
UNP	12,154	58.48%	198,662	51.12%	2,569,199	50.43%
SLFP	8,193	39.42%	182,220	46.89%	2,289,857	44.95%
SLMP	436	2.10%	7,717	1.99%	235,701	4.63%
Valid Votes	20,783	98.98%	388,599	98.91%	5,094,754	98.24%
Rejected Votes	214	1.02%	4,281	1.09%	91,499	1.76%
Total Polled	20,997	35.12%	392,880	53.49%	5,186,256	55.87%
Registered Electors	59,781		734,453		9,283,143	

=== 1982 Sri Lankan Presidential Election ===
Party	Hiriyala		Kurunegala Electoral District		Sri Lanka	
Party	Votes	%	Votes	%	Votes	%
UNP	28,098	61.67%	345,769	55.77%	3,450,815	52.93%
SLFP	15,608	34.26%	248,479	40.08%	2,546,348	39.05%
JVP	1,496	3.28%	21,835	3.52%	273,428	4.19%
Other Parties (with < 1%)	357	0.78%	3,895	0.63%	249,460	3.83%
Valid Votes	45,559	98.74%	619,978	99.13%	6,520,156	98.78%
Rejected Votes	580	1.26%	5,431	0.87%	80,470	1.22%
Total Polled	46,139	83.11%	625,409	86.00%	6,600,626	80.15%
Registered Electors	55,516		727,202		8,235,358	

== Parliamentary Election Results ==
=== Summary ===
The winner of Hiriyala has matched the final country result 4 out of 7 times. Hence, Hiriyala is a Weak Bellwether for Parliamentary Elections.

Year	Hiriyala	Kurunegala Electoral District	MAE %	Sri Lanka	MAE %
2015	UPFA	UPFA	1.07%	UNP	2.64%
2010	UPFA	UPFA	0.33%	UPFA	3.04%
2004	UPFA	UPFA	3.05%	UPFA	4.50%
2001	UNP	UNP	2.28%	UNP	3.40%
2000	UNP	PA	5.18%	PA	4.09%
1994	UNP	PA	4.54%	PA	4.16%
1989	UNP	UNP	8.25%	UNP	9.74%
Matches/Mean MAE	4/7	6/7	3.53%	7/7	4.51%

=== 2015 Sri Lankan Parliamentary Election ===
Party	Hiriyala		Kurunegala Electoral District		Sri Lanka	
Party	Votes	%	Votes	%	Votes	%
UPFA	32,076	47.75%	474,124	49.29%	4,732,664	42.48%
UNP	31,258	46.54%	441,275	45.87%	5,098,916	45.77%
JVP	2,711	4.04%	41,077	4.27%	544,154	4.88%
DP	937	1.39%	3,119	0.32%	28,587	0.26%
Other Parties (with < 1%)	187	0.28%	2,377	0.25%	54,454	0.49%
Valid Votes	67,169	94.54%	961,972	95.39%	11,140,333	95.35%
Rejected Votes	3,835	5.40%	46,036	4.56%	516,926	4.42%
Total Polled	71,048	72.58%	1,008,459	79.63%	11,684,111	77.66%
Registered Electors	97,886		1,266,443		15,044,490	

=== 2010 Sri Lankan Parliamentary Election ===
Party	Hiriyala		Kurunegala Electoral District		Sri Lanka	
Party	Votes	%	Votes	%	Votes	%
UPFA	26,911	64.26%	429,316	63.91%	4,846,388	60.38%
UNP	13,181	31.47%	213,713	31.81%	2,357,057	29.37%
DNA	1,673	3.99%	26,440	3.94%	441,251	5.50%
Other Parties (with < 1%)	115	0.27%	2,288	0.34%	34,779	0.43%
Valid Votes	41,880	91.52%	671,757	92.58%	8,026,322	96.03%
Rejected Votes	3,832	8.37%	53,130	7.32%	581,465	6.96%
Total Polled	45,758	49.66%	725,566	59.08%	8,358,246	59.29%
Registered Electors	92,150		1,228,044		14,097,690	

=== 2004 Sri Lankan Parliamentary Election ===
Party	Hiriyala		Kurunegala Electoral District		Sri Lanka	
Party	Votes	%	Votes	%	Votes	%
UPFA	26,607	48.61%	412,157	51.95%	4,223,126	45.70%
UNP	25,167	45.98%	340,768	42.95%	3,486,792	37.73%
JHU	2,740	5.01%	37,459	4.72%	552,723	5.98%
Other Parties (with < 1%)	223	0.41%	2,976	0.38%	64,640	0.70%
Valid Votes	54,737	94.24%	793,360	95.14%	9,241,931	94.52%
Rejected Votes	3,326	5.73%	40,261	4.83%	534,452	5.47%
Total Polled	58,082	69.53%	833,908	76.54%	9,777,821	75.74%
Registered Electors	83,535		1,089,482		12,909,631	

=== 2001 Sri Lankan Parliamentary Election ===
Party	Hiriyala		Kurunegala Electoral District		Sri Lanka	
Party	Votes	%	Votes	%	Votes	%
UNP	26,882	50.95%	382,768	48.59%	4,086,026	45.62%
PA	20,884	39.58%	332,775	42.24%	3,330,815	37.19%
JVP	4,292	8.13%	63,652	8.08%	815,353	9.10%
Other Parties (with < 1%)	708	1.34%	8,533	1.08%	133,770	1.49%
Valid Votes	52,766	94.30%	787,728	95.35%	8,955,844	94.77%
Rejected Votes	3,191	5.70%	38,451	4.65%	494,009	5.23%
Total Polled	55,957	69.95%	826,179	78.98%	9,449,878	76.03%
Registered Electors	80,000		1,046,102		12,428,762	

=== 2000 Sri Lankan Parliamentary Election ===
Party	Hiriyala		Kurunegala Electoral District		Sri Lanka	
Party	Votes	%	Votes	%	Votes	%
UNP	25,875	47.86%	308,106	41.86%	3,451,765	40.12%
PA	23,423	43.33%	358,794	48.75%	3,899,329	45.33%
JVP	2,807	5.19%	40,780	5.54%	518,725	6.03%
Other Parties (with < 1%)	1,114	2.06%	16,421	2.23%	221,514	2.57%
NUA	840	1.55%	11,927	1.62%	185,593	2.16%
Valid Votes	54,059	N/A	736,028	N/A	8,602,617	N/A

=== 1994 Sri Lankan Parliamentary Election ===
Party	Hiriyala		Kurunegala Electoral District		Sri Lanka	
Party	Votes	%	Votes	%	Votes	%
UNP	26,181	51.67%	332,547	47.02%	3,498,370	44.04%
PA	23,984	47.34%	366,856	51.87%	3,887,805	48.94%
Other Parties (with < 1%)	502	0.99%	7,876	1.11%	158,616	2.00%
Valid Votes	50,667	94.73%	707,279	95.92%	7,943,688	95.20%
Rejected Votes	2,817	5.27%	30,071	4.08%	400,395	4.80%
Total Polled	53,484	79.61%	737,350	82.15%	8,344,095	74.75%
Registered Electors	67,182		897,580		11,163,064	

=== 1989 Sri Lankan Parliamentary Election ===
Party	Hiriyala		Kurunegala Electoral District		Sri Lanka	
Party	Votes	%	Votes	%	Votes	%
UNP	25,073	68.03%	314,724	58.51%	2,838,005	50.71%
SLFP	10,734	29.12%	195,526	36.35%	1,785,369	31.90%
ELJP	610	1.66%	13,759	2.56%	67,723	1.21%
Other Parties (with < 1%)	439	1.19%	13,907	2.59%	232,463	4.15%
Valid Votes	36,856	93.33%	537,916	94.02%	5,596,468	93.87%
Rejected Votes	2,632	6.67%	34,212	5.98%	365,563	6.13%
Total Polled	39,488	66.88%	572,128	72.88%	5,962,031	63.60%
Registered Electors	59,043		784,991		9,374,164	

== Demographics ==
=== Ethnicity ===
The Hiriyala Polling Division has a Sinhalese majority (92.5%) . In comparison, the Kurunegala Electoral District (which contains the Hiriyala Polling Division) has a Sinhalese majority (91.4%)

Ethnicity in Hiriyala
1. Sinhalese (92.5%)
2. Moor (6.50%)
3. Other (1.00%)

=== Religion ===
The Hiriyala Polling Division has a Buddhist majority (91.4%) . In comparison, the Kurunegala Electoral District (which contains the Hiriyala Polling Division) has a Buddhist majority (88.5%)

Religion in Hiriyala
1. Buddhist (91.4%)
2. Muslim (6.80%)
3. Other (1.80%)
