= Galgamuwa Polling Division =

Galgamuwa
- Polling Division
- Coordinates: 8.055996°N 80.264573°E
- Country: Sri Lanka
- Province: North Western Province, Sri Lanka
- Electoral District: Kurunegala Electoral District

Area
  - Total: 669.85 km^{2} (258.63 sq mi)

Population (2012)
  - Total: 112,271
  - Density: 168/km^{2} (440/sq mi)
- ISO 3166 code: EC-15A

The Galgamuwa Polling Division is a polling division in the Kurunegala Electoral District, in the North Western Province, Sri Lanka.

== Presidential Election Results ==
=== Summary ===
The winner of Galgamuwa has matched the final country result 6 out of 8 times.

Year	Galgamuwa	Kurunegala Electoral District	MAE %	Sri Lanka	MAE %
2019	SLPP	SLPP	1.19%	SLPP	6.22%
2015	UPFA	UPFA	6.17%	NDF	11.78%
2010	UPFA	UPFA	4.09%	UPFA	8.98%
2005	UPFA	UPFA	2.36%	UPFA	4.18%
1999	PA	PA	3.39%	PA	2.66%
1994	PA	PA	3.08%	PA	0.11%
1988	SLFP	UNP	3.96%	UNP	4.41%
1982	UNP	UNP	5.06%	UNP	3.81%
Matches/Mean MAE	6/8	7/8	3.66%	8/8	5.27%

=== 2019 Sri Lankan Presidential Election ===
Party	Galgamuwa		Kurunegala Electoral District		Sri Lanka	
Party	Votes	%	Votes	%	Votes	%
SLPP	50,185	59.17%	652,278	57.90%	6,924,255	52.25%
NDF	30,373	35.81%	416,961	37.01%	5,564,239	41.99%
NMPP	2,553	3.01%	36,178	3.21%	418,553	3.16%
Other Parties (with < 1%)	1,698	2.00%	21,193	1.88%	345,452	2.61%
Valid Votes	84,809	99.39%	1,126,610	99.25%	13,252,499	98.99%
Rejected Votes	518	0.61%	8,522	0.75%	135,452	1.01%
Total Polled	85,327	85.37%	1,135,132	85.24%	13,387,951	83.71%
Registered Electors	99,948		1,331,705		15,992,568	

=== 2015 Sri Lankan Presidential Election ===
Party	Galgamuwa		Kurunegala Electoral District		Sri Lanka	
Party	Votes	%	Votes	%	Votes	%
UPFA	46,848	59.66%	556,868	53.46%	5,768,090	47.58%
NDF	31,027	39.51%	476,602	45.76%	6,217,162	51.28%
Other Parties (with < 1%)	655	0.83%	8,154	0.78%	138,200	1.14%
Valid Votes	78,530	99.24%	1,041,624	99.12%	12,123,452	98.85%
Rejected Votes	602	0.76%	9,285	0.88%	140,925	1.15%
Total Polled	79,132	76.46%	1,050,909	78.82%	12,264,377	78.69%
Registered Electors	103,488		1,333,377		15,585,942	

=== 2010 Sri Lankan Presidential Election ===
Party	Galgamuwa		Kurunegala Electoral District		Sri Lanka	
Party	Votes	%	Votes	%	Votes	%
UPFA	46,752	67.11%	582,784	63.08%	6,015,934	57.88%
NDF	21,666	31.10%	327,594	35.46%	4,173,185	40.15%
Other Parties (with < 1%)	1,243	1.78%	13,515	1.46%	204,494	1.97%
Valid Votes	69,661	99.52%	923,893	99.29%	10,393,613	99.03%
Rejected Votes	334	0.48%	6,644	0.71%	101,838	0.97%
Total Polled	69,995	72.64%	930,537	75.59%	10,495,451	66.70%
Registered Electors	96,354		1,230,966		15,734,587	

=== 2005 Sri Lankan Presidential Election ===
Party	Galgamuwa		Kurunegala Electoral District		Sri Lanka	
Party	Votes	%	Votes	%	Votes	%
UPFA	37,876	54.63%	468,507	52.26%	4,887,152	50.29%
UNP	30,720	44.31%	418,809	46.72%	4,706,366	48.43%
Other Parties (with < 1%)	739	1.07%	9,181	1.02%	123,521	1.27%
Valid Votes	69,335	99.13%	896,497	99.07%	9,717,039	98.88%
Rejected Votes	610	0.87%	8,458	0.93%	109,869	1.12%
Total Polled	69,945	76.28%	904,955	77.87%	9,826,908	69.51%
Registered Electors	91,698		1,162,099		14,136,979	

=== 1999 Sri Lankan Presidential Election ===
Party	Galgamuwa		Kurunegala Electoral District		Sri Lanka	
Party	Votes	%	Votes	%	Votes	%
PA	31,610	53.97%	377,483	50.77%	4,312,157	51.12%
UNP	23,395	39.94%	326,327	43.89%	3,602,748	42.71%
JVP	2,645	4.52%	27,354	3.68%	343,927	4.08%
Other Parties (with < 1%)	920	1.57%	12,355	1.66%	176,679	2.09%
Valid Votes	58,570	98.21%	743,519	97.99%	8,435,754	97.69%
Rejected Votes	1,068	1.79%	15,272	2.01%	199,536	2.31%
Total Polled	59,638	75.35%	758,791	75.83%	8,635,290	72.17%
Registered Electors	79,147		1,000,624		11,965,536	

=== 1994 Sri Lankan Presidential Election ===
Party	Galgamuwa		Kurunegala Electoral District		Sri Lanka	
Party	Votes	%	Votes	%	Votes	%
PA	33,011	62.41%	403,838	59.36%	4,709,205	62.28%
UNP	19,033	35.99%	266,740	39.21%	2,715,283	35.91%
Other Parties (with < 1%)	847	1.60%	9,766	1.44%	137,040	1.81%
Valid Votes	52,891	98.40%	680,344	98.48%	7,561,526	98.03%
Rejected Votes	858	1.60%	10,511	1.52%	151,706	1.97%
Total Polled	53,749	76.92%	690,855	76.97%	7,713,232	69.12%
Registered Electors	69,872		897,539		11,158,880	

=== 1988 Sri Lankan Presidential Election ===
Party	Galgamuwa		Kurunegala Electoral District		Sri Lanka	
Party	Votes	%	Votes	%	Votes	%
SLFP	13,705	50.08%	182,220	46.89%	2,289,857	44.95%
UNP	12,687	46.36%	198,662	51.12%	2,569,199	50.43%
SLMP	975	3.56%	7,717	1.99%	235,701	4.63%
Valid Votes	27,367	98.68%	388,599	98.91%	5,094,754	98.24%
Rejected Votes	366	1.32%	4,281	1.09%	91,499	1.76%
Total Polled	27,733	45.50%	392,880	53.49%	5,186,256	55.87%
Registered Electors	60,948		734,453		9,283,143	

=== 1982 Sri Lankan Presidential Election ===
Party	Galgamuwa		Kurunegala Electoral District		Sri Lanka	
Party	Votes	%	Votes	%	Votes	%
UNP	23,438	50.33%	345,769	55.77%	3,450,815	52.93%
SLFP	20,998	45.09%	248,479	40.08%	2,546,348	39.05%
JVP	1,882	4.04%	21,835	3.52%	273,428	4.19%
Other Parties (with < 1%)	250	0.54%	3,895	0.63%	249,460	3.83%
Valid Votes	46,568	99.21%	619,978	99.13%	6,520,156	98.78%
Rejected Votes	369	0.79%	5,431	0.87%	80,470	1.22%
Total Polled	46,937	87.61%	625,409	86.00%	6,600,626	80.15%
Registered Electors	53,576		727,202		8,235,358	

== Parliamentary Election Results ==
=== Summary ===
The winner of Galgamuwa has matched the final country result 6 out of 7 times, making it a bellwether for parliamentary elections.

Year	Galgamuwa	Kurunegala Electoral District	MAE %	Sri Lanka	MAE %
2015	UPFA	UPFA	5.14%	UNP	7.63%
2010	UPFA	UPFA	6.56%	UPFA	7.67%
2004	UPFA	UPFA	4.17%	UPFA	6.93%
2001	UNP	UNP	2.28%	UNP	3.00%
2000	PA	PA	36.94%	PA	35.72%
1994	PA	PA	4.48%	PA	4.34%
1989	UNP	UNP	6.66%	UNP	3.47%
Matches/Mean MAE	6/7	6/7	9.46%	7/7	9.82%

=== 2015 Sri Lankan Parliamentary Election ===
Party	Galgamuwa		Kurunegala Electoral District		Sri Lanka	
Party	Votes	%	Votes	%	Votes	%
UPFA	39,539	54.91%	474,124	49.29%	4,732,664	42.48%
UNP	29,324	40.73%	441,275	45.87%	5,098,916	45.77%
JVP	2,903	4.03%	41,077	4.27%	544,154	4.88%
Other Parties (with < 1%)	238	0.33%	5,496	0.57%	83,041	0.75%
Valid Votes	72,004	95.07%	961,972	95.39%	11,140,333	95.35%
Rejected Votes	3,696	4.88%	46,036	4.56%	516,926	4.42%
Total Polled	75,736	73.18%	1,008,459	79.63%	11,684,111	77.66%
Registered Electors	103,488		1,266,443		15,044,490	

=== 2010 Sri Lankan Parliamentary Election ===
Party	Galgamuwa		Kurunegala Electoral District		Sri Lanka	
Party	Votes	%	Votes	%	Votes	%
UPFA	34,119	71.00%	429,316	63.91%	4,846,388	60.38%
UNP	12,267	25.53%	213,713	31.81%	2,357,057	29.37%
DNA	1,503	3.13%	26,440	3.94%	441,251	5.50%
Other Parties (with < 1%)	165	0.34%	2,288	0.34%	34,779	0.43%
Valid Votes	48,054	89.96%	671,757	92.58%	8,026,322	96.03%
Rejected Votes	5,319	9.96%	53,130	7.32%	581,465	6.96%
Total Polled	53,417	55.44%	725,566	59.08%	8,358,246	59.29%
Registered Electors	96,354		1,228,044		14,097,690	

=== 2004 Sri Lankan Parliamentary Election ===
Party	Galgamuwa		Kurunegala Electoral District		Sri Lanka	
Party	Votes	%	Votes	%	Votes	%
UPFA	36,037	57.79%	412,157	51.95%	4,223,126	45.70%
UNP	25,377	40.70%	340,768	42.95%	3,486,792	37.73%
JHU	795	1.27%	37,459	4.72%	552,723	5.98%
Other Parties (with < 1%)	146	0.23%	2,976	0.38%	64,640	0.70%
Valid Votes	62,355	95.28%	793,360	95.14%	9,241,931	94.52%
Rejected Votes	3,061	4.68%	40,261	4.83%	534,452	5.47%
Total Polled	65,442	73.68%	833,908	76.54%	9,777,821	75.74%
Registered Electors	88,822		1,089,482		12,909,631	

=== 2001 Sri Lankan Parliamentary Election ===
Party	Galgamuwa		Kurunegala Electoral District		Sri Lanka	
Party	Votes	%	Votes	%	Votes	%
UNP	28,330	46.01%	382,768	48.59%	4,086,026	45.62%
PA	27,465	44.61%	332,775	42.24%	3,330,815	37.19%
JVP	5,167	8.39%	63,652	8.08%	815,353	9.10%
Other Parties (with < 1%)	607	0.99%	8,533	1.08%	133,770	1.49%
Valid Votes	61,569	95.57%	787,728	95.35%	8,955,844	94.77%
Rejected Votes	2,855	4.43%	38,451	4.65%	494,009	5.23%
Total Polled	64,424	76.06%	826,179	78.98%	9,449,878	76.03%
Registered Electors	84,703		1,046,102		12,428,762	

=== 2000 Sri Lankan Parliamentary Election ===
Party	Galgamuwa		Kurunegala Electoral District		Sri Lanka	
Party	Votes	%	Votes	%	Votes	%
PA	31,133	88.38%	358,794	48.75%	3,899,329	45.33%
JVP	2,663	7.56%	40,780	5.54%	518,725	6.03%
Other Parties (with < 1%)	536	1.52%	320,835	43.59%	3,641,004	42.32%
NUA	495	1.41%	11,927	1.62%	185,593	2.16%
NLF	398	1.13%	3,692	0.50%	32,275	0.38%
Valid Votes	35,225	N/A	736,028	N/A	8,602,617	N/A

=== 1994 Sri Lankan Parliamentary Election ===
Party	Galgamuwa		Kurunegala Electoral District		Sri Lanka	
Party	Votes	%	Votes	%	Votes	%
PA	31,870	56.33%	366,856	51.87%	3,887,805	48.94%
UNP	23,996	42.41%	332,547	47.02%	3,498,370	44.04%
Other Parties (with < 1%)	714	1.26%	7,876	1.11%	158,616	2.00%
Valid Votes	56,580	96.05%	707,279	95.92%	7,943,688	95.20%
Rejected Votes	2,329	3.95%	30,071	4.08%	400,395	4.80%
Total Polled	58,909	84.31%	737,350	82.15%	8,344,095	74.75%
Registered Electors	69,872		897,580		11,163,064	

=== 1989 Sri Lankan Parliamentary Election ===
Party	Galgamuwa		Kurunegala Electoral District		Sri Lanka	
Party	Votes	%	Votes	%	Votes	%
UNP	20,412	50.90%	314,724	58.51%	2,838,005	50.71%
SLFP	16,976	42.33%	195,526	36.35%	1,785,369	31.90%
USA	1,232	3.07%	11,059	2.06%	141,983	2.54%
ELJP	1,173	2.92%	13,759	2.56%	67,723	1.21%
Other Parties (with < 1%)	311	0.78%	2,848	0.53%	90,480	1.62%
Valid Votes	40,104	91.89%	537,916	94.02%	5,596,468	93.87%
Rejected Votes	3,540	8.11%	34,212	5.98%	365,563	6.13%
Total Polled	43,644	72.31%	572,128	72.88%	5,962,031	63.60%
Registered Electors	60,359		784,991		9,374,164	

== Demographics ==
=== Ethnicity ===
The Galgamuwa Polling Division has a Sinhalese majority (93.3%) . In comparison, the Kurunegala Electoral District (which contains the Galgamuwa Polling Division) has a Sinhalese majority (91.4%)

Ethnicity in Galgamuwa
1. Sinhalese (93.3%)
2. Moor (5.90%)
3. Other (0.70%)

=== Religion ===
The Galgamuwa Polling Division has a Buddhist majority (92.7%) . In comparison, the Kurunegala Electoral District (which contains the Galgamuwa Polling Division) has a Buddhist majority (88.5%)

Religion in Galgamuwa
1. Buddhist (92.7%)
2. Muslim (6.00%)
3. Other (1.30%)
