= Attanagalla Polling Division =

Attanagalla
- Polling Division
- Coordinates: 7.117056°N 80.095826°E
- Country: Sri Lanka
- Province: Western Province, Sri Lanka
- Electoral District: Gampaha Electoral District

Area
  - Total: 163.13 km^{2} (62.98 sq mi)

Population (2012)
  - Total: 179,565
  - Density: 1,101/km^{2} (2,850/sq mi)
- ISO 3166 code: EC-02G

The Attanagalla Polling Division is a Polling Division in the Gampaha Electoral District, in the Western Province, Sri Lanka.

== Presidential Election Results ==
=== Summary ===
The winner of Attanagalla has matched the final country result 5 out of 8 times. Hence, Attanagalla is a Weak Bellwether for Presidential Elections.

Year	Attanagalla	Gampaha Electoral District	MAE %	Sri Lanka	MAE %
2019	SLPP	SLPP	0.40%	SLPP	6.53%
2015	UPFA	NDF	2.23%	NDF	3.88%
2010	UPFA	UPFA	4.63%	UPFA	7.93%
2005	UPFA	UPFA	5.76%	UPFA	10.04%
1999	PA	PA	8.87%	PA	13.85%
1994	PA	PA	8.88%	PA	11.09%
1988	SLFP	SLFP	10.67%	UNP	13.49%
1982	SLFP	UNP	12.02%	UNP	13.53%
Matches/Mean MAE	5/8	7/8	6.68%	8/8	10.04%

=== 2019 Sri Lankan Presidential Election ===
Party	Attanagalla		Gampaha Electoral District		Sri Lanka	
Party	Votes	%	Votes	%	Votes	%
SLPP	66,850	58.98%	855,870	59.28%	6,924,255	52.25%
NDF	39,548	34.89%	494,671	34.26%	5,564,239	41.99%
NMPP	4,829	4.26%	61,760	4.28%	418,553	3.16%
Other Parties (with < 1%)	2,121	1.87%	31,499	2.18%	345,452	2.61%
Valid Votes	113,348	99.16%	1,443,800	98.92%	13,252,499	98.99%
Rejected Votes	960	0.84%	15,751	1.08%	135,452	1.01%
Total Polled	114,308	84.29%	1,459,551	83.31%	13,387,951	83.71%
Registered Electors	135,618		1,751,892		15,992,568	

=== 2015 Sri Lankan Presidential Election ===
Party	Attanagalla		Gampaha Electoral District		Sri Lanka	
Party	Votes	%	Votes	%	Votes	%
UPFA	54,777	51.71%	664,347	49.49%	5,768,090	47.58%
NDF	50,380	47.56%	669,007	49.83%	6,217,162	51.28%
Other Parties (with < 1%)	774	0.73%	9,142	0.68%	138,200	1.14%
Valid Votes	105,931	99.04%	1,342,496	98.92%	12,123,452	98.85%
Rejected Votes	1,024	0.96%	14,647	1.08%	140,925	1.15%
Total Polled	106,955	80.40%	1,357,143	80.77%	12,264,377	78.69%
Registered Electors	133,023		1,680,263		15,585,942	

=== 2010 Sri Lankan Presidential Election ===
Party	Attanagalla		Gampaha Electoral District		Sri Lanka	
Party	Votes	%	Votes	%	Votes	%
UPFA	61,337	66.30%	718,716	61.66%	6,015,934	57.88%
NDF	30,110	32.55%	434,506	37.28%	4,173,185	40.15%
Other Parties (with < 1%)	1,068	1.15%	12,426	1.07%	204,494	1.97%
Valid Votes	92,515	99.31%	1,165,648	99.24%	10,393,613	99.03%
Rejected Votes	645	0.69%	8,960	0.76%	101,838	0.97%
Total Polled	93,160	77.06%	1,174,608	78.03%	10,495,451	66.70%
Registered Electors	120,900		1,505,363		15,734,587	

=== 2005 Sri Lankan Presidential Election ===
Party	Attanagalla		Gampaha Electoral District		Sri Lanka	
Party	Votes	%	Votes	%	Votes	%
UPFA	52,393	60.52%	596,698	54.78%	4,887,152	50.29%
UNP	33,171	38.32%	481,764	44.23%	4,706,366	48.43%
Other Parties (with < 1%)	1,004	1.16%	10,815	0.99%	123,521	1.27%
Valid Votes	86,568	98.76%	1,089,277	98.94%	9,717,039	98.88%
Rejected Votes	1,090	1.24%	11,724	1.06%	109,869	1.12%
Total Polled	87,658	77.64%	1,101,001	79.17%	9,826,908	69.51%
Registered Electors	112,898		1,390,691		14,136,979	

=== 1999 Sri Lankan Presidential Election ===
Party	Attanagalla		Gampaha Electoral District		Sri Lanka	
Party	Votes	%	Votes	%	Votes	%
PA	51,204	65.79%	532,796	56.58%	4,312,157	51.12%
UNP	21,709	27.89%	353,969	37.59%	3,602,748	42.71%
JVP	3,608	4.64%	40,472	4.30%	343,927	4.08%
Other Parties (with < 1%)	1,307	1.68%	14,382	1.53%	176,679	2.09%
Valid Votes	77,828	97.58%	941,619	97.84%	8,435,754	97.69%
Rejected Votes	1,933	2.42%	20,768	2.16%	199,536	2.31%
Total Polled	79,761	78.61%	962,387	77.12%	8,635,290	72.17%
Registered Electors	101,470		1,247,860		11,965,536	

=== 1994 Sri Lankan Presidential Election ===
Party	Attanagalla		Gampaha Electoral District		Sri Lanka	
Party	Votes	%	Votes	%	Votes	%
PA	51,923	73.64%	550,654	64.74%	4,709,205	62.28%
UNP	17,437	24.73%	288,608	33.93%	2,715,283	35.91%
Other Parties (with < 1%)	1,151	1.63%	11,256	1.32%	137,040	1.81%
Valid Votes	70,511	98.51%	850,518	98.48%	7,561,526	98.03%
Rejected Votes	1,065	1.49%	13,137	1.52%	151,706	1.97%
Total Polled	71,576	77.88%	863,655	74.16%	7,713,232	69.12%
Registered Electors	91,907		1,164,625		11,158,880	

=== 1988 Sri Lankan Presidential Election ===
Party	Attanagalla		Gampaha Electoral District		Sri Lanka	
Party	Votes	%	Votes	%	Votes	%
SLFP	35,758	60.12%	355,553	48.83%	2,289,857	44.95%
UNP	22,242	37.40%	350,092	48.08%	2,569,199	50.43%
SLMP	1,475	2.48%	22,467	3.09%	235,701	4.63%
Valid Votes	59,475	98.78%	728,112	98.63%	5,094,754	98.24%
Rejected Votes	735	1.22%	10,108	1.37%	91,499	1.76%
Total Polled	60,210	76.05%	738,220	74.93%	5,186,256	55.87%
Registered Electors	79,172		985,206		9,283,143	

=== 1982 Sri Lankan Presidential Election ===
Party	Attanagalla		Gampaha Electoral District		Sri Lanka	
Party	Votes	%	Votes	%	Votes	%
SLFP	31,495	55.92%	301,808	43.31%	2,546,348	39.05%
UNP	22,531	40.00%	365,847	52.50%	3,450,815	52.93%
JVP	1,926	3.42%	23,701	3.40%	273,428	4.19%
Other Parties (with < 1%)	369	0.66%	5,491	0.79%	249,460	3.83%
Valid Votes	56,321	99.24%	696,847	99.15%	6,520,156	98.78%
Rejected Votes	430	0.76%	5,992	0.85%	80,470	1.22%
Total Polled	56,751	84.63%	702,839	82.70%	6,600,626	80.15%
Registered Electors	67,061		849,896		8,235,358	

== Parliamentary Election Results ==
=== Summary ===
The winner of Attanagalla has matched the final country result 4 out of 7 times. Hence, Attanagalla is a Weak Bellwether for Parliamentary Elections.

Year	Attanagalla	Gampaha Electoral District	MAE %	Sri Lanka	MAE %
2015	UPFA	UNP	2.27%	UNP	2.70%
2010	UPFA	UPFA	6.28%	UPFA	8.25%
2004	UPFA	UPFA	5.57%	UPFA	8.37%
2001	PA	UNP	5.81%	UNP	8.71%
2000	PA	PA	6.67%	PA	8.56%
1994	PA	PA	7.56%	PA	11.90%
1989	SLFP	UNP	9.06%	UNP	9.12%
Matches/Mean MAE	4/7	7/7	6.17%	7/7	8.23%

=== 2015 Sri Lankan Parliamentary Election ===
Party	Attanagalla		Gampaha Electoral District		Sri Lanka	
Party	Votes	%	Votes	%	Votes	%
UPFA	44,926	47.36%	549,958	44.96%	4,732,664	42.48%
UNP	42,371	44.67%	577,004	47.17%	5,098,916	45.77%
JVP	6,973	7.35%	87,880	7.18%	544,154	4.88%
Other Parties (with < 1%)	586	0.62%	8,332	0.68%	81,501	0.73%
Valid Votes	94,856	94.97%	1,223,174	95.51%	11,140,333	95.35%
Rejected Votes	4,880	4.89%	56,246	4.39%	516,926	4.42%
Total Polled	99,885	75.09%	1,280,647	78.21%	11,684,111	77.66%
Registered Electors	133,023		1,637,537		15,044,490	

=== 2010 Sri Lankan Parliamentary Election ===
Party	Attanagalla		Gampaha Electoral District		Sri Lanka	
Party	Votes	%	Votes	%	Votes	%
UPFA	51,172	70.18%	589,476	63.40%	4,846,388	60.38%
UNP	15,912	21.82%	266,523	28.67%	2,357,057	29.37%
DNA	5,626	7.72%	69,747	7.50%	441,251	5.50%
Other Parties (with < 1%)	204	0.28%	3,985	0.43%	19,003	0.24%
Valid Votes	72,914	95.04%	929,731	94.83%	8,026,322	96.03%
Rejected Votes	3,774	4.92%	50,234	5.12%	581,465	6.96%
Total Polled	76,722	63.46%	980,467	65.06%	8,358,246	59.29%
Registered Electors	120,900		1,506,969		14,097,690	

=== 2004 Sri Lankan Parliamentary Election ===
Party	Attanagalla		Gampaha Electoral District		Sri Lanka	
Party	Votes	%	Votes	%	Votes	%
UPFA	45,529	57.54%	509,963	51.52%	4,223,126	45.70%
UNP	24,282	30.69%	367,572	37.14%	3,486,792	37.73%
JHU	8,741	11.05%	102,516	10.36%	552,723	5.98%
Other Parties (with < 1%)	576	0.73%	9,691	0.98%	57,229	0.62%
Valid Votes	79,128	95.33%	989,742	95.96%	9,241,931	94.52%
Rejected Votes	3,853	4.64%	41,462	4.02%	534,452	5.47%
Total Polled	83,008	75.65%	1,031,464	77.72%	9,777,821	75.74%
Registered Electors	109,731		1,327,145		12,909,631	

=== 2001 Sri Lankan Parliamentary Election ===
Party	Attanagalla		Gampaha Electoral District		Sri Lanka	
Party	Votes	%	Votes	%	Votes	%
PA	39,531	49.53%	428,780	43.08%	3,330,815	37.19%
UNP	29,618	37.11%	437,289	43.94%	4,086,026	45.62%
JVP	9,351	11.72%	113,990	11.45%	815,353	9.10%
Other Parties (with < 1%)	1,316	1.65%	15,171	1.52%	137,826	1.54%
Valid Votes	79,816	95.81%	995,230	96.30%	8,955,844	94.77%
Rejected Votes	3,490	4.19%	38,187	3.70%	494,009	5.23%
Total Polled	83,306	78.57%	1,033,417	80.36%	9,449,878	76.03%
Registered Electors	106,025		1,285,973		12,428,762	

=== 2000 Sri Lankan Parliamentary Election ===
Party	Attanagalla		Gampaha Electoral District		Sri Lanka	
Party	Votes	%	Votes	%	Votes	%
PA	42,537	54.82%	470,018	48.87%	3,899,329	45.33%
UNP	23,248	29.96%	378,328	39.34%	3,451,765	40.12%
JVP	6,229	8.03%	73,110	7.60%	518,725	6.03%
NUA	3,475	4.48%	11,013	1.15%	185,593	2.16%
SU	1,315	1.69%	20,297	2.11%	127,859	1.49%
Other Parties (with < 1%)	796	1.03%	8,943	0.93%	133,530	1.55%
Valid Votes	77,600	N/A	961,709	N/A	8,602,617	N/A

=== 1994 Sri Lankan Parliamentary Election ===
Party	Attanagalla		Gampaha Electoral District		Sri Lanka	
Party	Votes	%	Votes	%	Votes	%
PA	45,629	64.50%	509,030	56.79%	3,887,805	48.94%
UNP	24,269	34.30%	375,631	41.91%	3,498,370	44.04%
SLPF	849	1.20%	11,627	1.30%	90,078	1.13%
Valid Votes	70,747	96.41%	896,288	96.39%	7,943,688	95.20%
Rejected Votes	2,638	3.59%	33,553	3.61%	400,395	4.80%
Total Polled	73,385	79.85%	929,841	79.65%	8,344,095	74.75%
Registered Electors	91,907		1,167,469		11,163,064	

=== 1989 Sri Lankan Parliamentary Election ===
Party	Attanagalla		Gampaha Electoral District		Sri Lanka	
Party	Votes	%	Votes	%	Votes	%
SLFP	28,576	50.40%	294,490	41.34%	1,785,369	31.90%
UNP	25,194	44.43%	385,733	54.14%	2,838,005	50.71%
ELJP	1,765	3.11%	10,549	1.48%	67,723	1.21%
USA	1,166	2.06%	21,665	3.04%	141,983	2.54%
Valid Votes	56,701	95.49%	712,437	95.64%	5,596,468	93.87%
Rejected Votes	2,677	4.51%	32,497	4.36%	365,563	6.13%
Total Polled	59,378	76.92%	744,934	76.82%	5,962,031	63.60%
Registered Electors	77,198		969,658		9,374,164	

== Demographics ==
=== Ethnicity ===
The Attanagalla Polling Division has a Sinhalese majority (86.6%) and a significant Moor population (11.9%) . In comparison, the Gampaha Electoral District (which contains the Attanagalla Polling Division) has a Sinhalese majority (90.5%)

Ethnicity in Attanagalla
1. Sinhalese (86.6%)
2. Moor (11.9%)
3. Other (1.50%)

=== Religion ===
The Attanagalla Polling Division has a Buddhist majority (84.5%) and a significant Muslim population (12.4%) . In comparison, the Gampaha Electoral District (which contains the Attanagalla Polling Division) has a Buddhist majority (71.3%) and a significant Roman Catholic population (19.5%)

Religion in Attanagalla
1. Buddhist (84.5%)
2. Muslim (12.4%)
3. Roman Catholic (2.10%)
4. Other (1.00%)
