= Pallewela (Uva Paranagama) Grama Niladhari Division =

Pallewela
- Grama Niladhari Division
- Interactive map of Pallewela
- Coordinates: 6.944203°N 80.909524°E
- Country: Sri Lanka
- Province: Uva Province
- District: Badulla District
- Divisional Secretariat: Uva Paranagama Divisional Secretariat
- Electoral District: Badulla Electoral District
- Polling Division: Uva Paranagama Polling Division

Area
  - Total: 1.43 km^{2} (0.55 sq mi)
- Elevation: 1,079 m (3,540 ft)

Population (2012)
  - Total: 1,285
  - Density: 899/km^{2} (2,330/sq mi)
- ISO 3166 code: LK-8127220

Pallewela

Pallewela Grama Niladhari Division is a Grama Niladhari Division of the Uva Paranagama Divisional Secretariat of Badulla District of Uva Province, Sri Lanka . It has Grama Niladhari Division Code 45D.

Pallewela is a surrounded by the Busdulla, Unapana, Balagala, Kumarapattiya, Sapugolla and Lunuwatta Grama Niladhari Divisions.

== Demographics ==
=== Ethnicity ===
The Pallewela Grama Niladhari Division has a Sinhalese majority (97.9%) . In comparison, the Uva Paranagama Divisional Secretariat (which contains the Pallewela Grama Niladhari Division) has a Sinhalese majority (83.8%) and a significant Indian Tamil population (11.2%)

Ethnicity in Pallewela
1. Sinhalese (97.9%)
2. Indian Tamil (1.70%)
3. Other (0.40%)

=== Religion ===
The Pallewela Grama Niladhari Division has a Buddhist majority (98.5%) . In comparison, the Uva Paranagama Divisional Secretariat (which contains the Pallewela Grama Niladhari Division) has a Buddhist majority (83.8%) and a significant Hindu population (12.3%)

Religion in Pallewela
1. Buddhist (98.5%)
2. Hindu (1.50%)
3. Other (0.00%)
