= Haputale Polling Division =

Haputale
- Polling division
- Interactive map of Haputale
- Coordinates: 6.732968°N 80.944873°E
- Country: Sri Lanka
- Province: Uva Province
- Electoral district: Badulla Electoral District

Area
  - Total: 469.51 km^{2} (181.28 sq mi)

Population (2012)
  - Total: 87,356
  - Density: 186/km^{2} (480/sq mi)

The Haputale Polling Division is a Polling Division in the Badulla Electoral District, in the Uva Province, Sri Lanka.

== Presidential Election Results ==
=== Summary ===
The winner of Haputale has matched the final country result 4 out of 8 times.

Year	Haputale	Badulla Electoral District	MAE %	Sri Lanka	MAE %
2019	NDF	SLPP	8.67%	SLPP	11.46%
2015	NDF	NDF	8.91%	NDF	7.14%
2010	NDF	UPFA	9.49%	UPFA	13.99%
2005	UNP	UNP	7.73%	UPFA	12.61%
1999	UNP	UNP	1.13%	PA	5.80%
1994	PA	PA	3.12%	PA	3.54%
1988	UNP	UNP	4.78%	UNP	3.70%
1982	UNP	UNP	4.81%	UNP	1.94%
Matches/Mean MAE	4/8	6/8	6.08%	8/8	7.52%

=== 2019 Sri Lankan Presidential Election ===
Party	Haputale		Badulla Electoral District		Sri Lanka	
Party	Votes	%	Votes	%	Votes	%
NDF	29,641	54.29%	251,706	44.92%	5,564,239	41.99%
SLPP	21,993	40.28%	276,211	49.29%	6,924,255	52.25%
Other Parties (with < 1%)	1,941	3.56%	17,622	3.14%	345,452	2.61%
NMPP	1,023	1.87%	14,806	2.64%	418,553	3.16%
Valid Votes	54,598	98.58%	560,345	98.77%	13,252,499	98.99%
Rejected Votes	784	1.42%	6,978	1.23%	135,452	1.01%
Total Polled	55,382	84.83%	567,323	86.25%	13,387,951	83.71%
Registered Electors	65,289		657,766		15,992,568	

=== 2015 Sri Lankan Presidential Election ===
Party	Haputale		Badulla Electoral District		Sri Lanka	
Party	Votes	%	Votes	%	Votes	%
NDF	28,725	58.02%	249,524	49.21%	6,217,162	51.28%
UPFA	19,725	39.84%	249,243	49.15%	5,768,090	47.58%
Other Parties (with < 1%)	1,057	2.14%	8,303	1.64%	138,200	1.14%
Valid Votes	49,507	98.27%	507,070	98.47%	12,123,452	98.85%
Rejected Votes	874	1.73%	7,871	1.53%	140,925	1.15%
Total Polled	50,381	77.26%	514,941	79.51%	12,264,377	78.69%
Registered Electors	65,209		647,628		15,585,942	

=== 2010 Sri Lankan Presidential Election ===
Party	Haputale		Badulla Electoral District		Sri Lanka	
Party	Votes	%	Votes	%	Votes	%
NDF	23,856	54.02%	198,835	44.55%	4,173,185	40.15%
UPFA	19,135	43.33%	237,579	53.23%	6,015,934	57.88%
Other Parties (with < 1%)	1,168	2.64%	9,880	2.21%	204,494	1.97%
Valid Votes	44,159	98.15%	446,294	98.66%	10,393,613	99.03%
Rejected Votes	831	1.85%	6,083	1.34%	101,838	0.97%
Total Polled	44,990	74.11%	452,377	75.62%	10,495,451	66.70%
Registered Electors	60,706		598,190		15,734,587	

=== 2005 Sri Lankan Presidential Election ===
Party	Haputale		Badulla Electoral District		Sri Lanka	
Party	Votes	%	Votes	%	Votes	%
UNP	25,935	60.91%	226,582	53.11%	4,706,366	48.43%
UPFA	15,856	37.24%	192,734	45.18%	4,887,152	50.29%
Other Parties (with < 1%)	791	1.86%	7,283	1.71%	123,521	1.27%
Valid Votes	42,582	98.30%	426,599	98.43%	9,717,039	98.88%
Rejected Votes	736	1.70%	6,825	1.57%	109,869	1.12%
Total Polled	43,318	77.05%	433,424	78.67%	9,826,908	69.51%
Registered Electors	56,220		550,926		14,136,979	

=== 1999 Sri Lankan Presidential Election ===
Party	Haputale		Badulla Electoral District		Sri Lanka	
Party	Votes	%	Votes	%	Votes	%
UNP	18,053	49.60%	172,884	47.97%	3,602,748	42.71%
PA	16,622	45.67%	167,000	46.33%	4,312,157	51.12%
Other Parties (with < 1%)	895	2.46%	8,512	2.36%	176,679	2.09%
JVP	826	2.27%	12,025	3.34%	343,927	4.08%
Valid Votes	36,396	96.78%	360,421	97.04%	8,435,754	97.69%
Rejected Votes	1,210	3.22%	10,979	2.96%	199,536	2.31%
Total Polled	37,606	76.97%	371,400	78.25%	8,635,290	72.17%
Registered Electors	48,861		474,610		11,965,536	

=== 1994 Sri Lankan Presidential Election ===
Party	Haputale		Badulla Electoral District		Sri Lanka	
Party	Votes	%	Votes	%	Votes	%
PA	20,108	58.23%	182,810	55.27%	4,709,205	62.28%
UNP	13,371	38.72%	139,611	42.21%	2,715,283	35.91%
Ind 2	551	1.60%	3,847	1.16%	58,888	0.78%
Other Parties (with < 1%)	501	1.45%	4,504	1.36%	78,152	1.03%
Valid Votes	34,531	94.06%	330,772	95.91%	7,561,526	98.03%
Rejected Votes	2,182	5.94%	14,093	4.09%	151,706	1.97%
Total Polled	36,713	75.15%	344,865	77.47%	7,713,232	69.12%
Registered Electors	48,853		445,146		11,158,880	

=== 1988 Sri Lankan Presidential Election ===
Party	Haputale		Badulla Electoral District		Sri Lanka	
Party	Votes	%	Votes	%	Votes	%
UNP	10,426	55.34%	80,779	60.09%	2,569,199	50.43%
SLFP	8,003	42.48%	50,223	37.36%	2,289,857	44.95%
SLMP	412	2.19%	3,422	2.55%	235,701	4.63%
Valid Votes	18,841	97.92%	134,424	97.62%	5,094,754	98.24%
Rejected Votes	401	2.08%	3,276	2.38%	91,499	1.76%
Total Polled	19,242	62.79%	137,700	44.21%	5,186,256	55.87%
Registered Electors	30,645		311,473		9,283,143	

=== 1982 Sri Lankan Presidential Election ===
Party	Haputale		Badulla Electoral District		Sri Lanka	
Party	Votes	%	Votes	%	Votes	%
UNP	11,822	53.95%	141,062	58.67%	3,450,815	52.93%
SLFP	9,257	42.24%	88,462	36.79%	2,546,348	39.05%
JVP	482	2.20%	7,713	3.21%	273,428	4.19%
LSSP	242	1.10%	2,115	0.88%	58,531	0.90%
Other Parties (with < 1%)	110	0.50%	1,088	0.45%	190,929	2.93%
Valid Votes	21,913	98.91%	240,440	98.77%	6,520,156	98.78%
Rejected Votes	242	1.09%	2,982	1.23%	80,470	1.22%
Total Polled	22,155	79.82%	243,422	85.47%	6,600,626	80.15%
Registered Electors	27,756		284,801		8,235,358	

== Parliamentary Election Results ==
=== Summary ===
The winner of Haputale has matched the final country result 4 out of 7 times. Hence, Haputale is a Weak Bellwether for Parliamentary Elections.

Year	Haputale	Badulla Electoral District	MAE %	Sri Lanka	MAE %
2015	UNP	UNP	5.81%	UNP	11.70%
2010	UPFA	UPFA	5.59%	UPFA	7.71%
2004	UNP	UNP	7.03%	UPFA	9.39%
2001	UNP	UNP	4.80%	UNP	8.32%
2000	UNP	UNP	2.00%	PA	5.77%
1994	UNP	UNP	1.97%	PA	8.95%
1989	UNP	UNP	1.32%	UNP	5.67%
Matches/Mean MAE	4/7	4/7	4.07%	7/7	8.22%

=== 2015 Sri Lankan Parliamentary Election ===
Party	Haputale		Badulla Electoral District		Sri Lanka	
Party	Votes	%	Votes	%	Votes	%
UNP	26,813	59.66%	258,844	54.82%	5,098,916	45.77%
UPFA	13,539	30.12%	179,459	38.01%	4,732,664	42.48%
CWC	2,949	6.56%	10,259	2.17%	17,107	0.15%
JVP	1,413	3.14%	21,445	4.54%	544,154	4.88%
Other Parties (with < 1%)	231	0.51%	2,159	0.46%	76,945	0.69%
Valid Votes	44,945	93.01%	472,166	95.03%	11,140,333	95.35%
Rejected Votes	3,325	6.88%	24,167	4.86%	516,926	4.42%
Total Polled	48,325	74.11%	496,849	80.07%	11,684,111	77.66%
Registered Electors	65,209		620,486		15,044,490	

=== 2010 Sri Lankan Parliamentary Election ===
Party	Haputale		Badulla Electoral District		Sri Lanka	
Party	Votes	%	Votes	%	Votes	%
UPFA	17,197	49.86%	203,689	58.25%	4,846,388	60.38%
UNP	11,575	33.56%	112,886	32.28%	2,357,057	29.37%
UPF	3,829	11.10%	11,481	3.28%	24,670	0.31%
DNA	1,346	3.90%	15,768	4.51%	441,251	5.50%
IG4B	397	1.15%	4,646	1.33%	5,076	0.06%
Other Parties (with < 1%)	146	0.42%	1,208	0.35%	23,594	0.29%
Valid Votes	34,490	91.67%	349,678	93.54%	8,026,322	96.03%
Rejected Votes	3,134	8.33%	24,169	6.46%	581,465	6.96%
Total Polled	37,624	61.98%	373,847	62.46%	8,358,246	59.29%
Registered Electors	60,706		598,521		14,097,690	

=== 2004 Sri Lankan Parliamentary Election ===
Party	Haputale		Badulla Electoral District		Sri Lanka	
Party	Votes	%	Votes	%	Votes	%
UNP	21,258	56.38%	181,705	49.09%	3,486,792	37.73%
UPFA	15,499	41.10%	178,634	48.26%	4,223,126	45.70%
JHU	639	1.69%	6,932	1.87%	552,723	5.98%
Other Parties (with < 1%)	312	0.83%	2,907	0.79%	57,589	0.62%
Valid Votes	37,708	91.56%	370,178	92.47%	9,241,931	94.52%
Rejected Votes	3,475	8.44%	30,159	7.53%	534,452	5.47%
Total Polled	41,183	75.16%	400,337	78.33%	9,777,821	75.74%
Registered Electors	54,797		511,115		12,909,631	

=== 2001 Sri Lankan Parliamentary Election ===
Party	Haputale		Badulla Electoral District		Sri Lanka	
Party	Votes	%	Votes	%	Votes	%
UNP	22,114	59.91%	201,173	53.81%	4,086,026	45.62%
PA	12,340	33.43%	138,443	37.03%	3,330,815	37.19%
JVP	1,729	4.68%	26,820	7.17%	815,353	9.10%
IND3	575	1.56%	5,065	1.35%	6,161	0.07%
Other Parties (with < 1%)	152	0.41%	2,336	0.62%	73,230	0.82%
Valid Votes	36,910	91.74%	373,837	93.35%	8,955,844	94.77%
Rejected Votes	3,325	8.26%	26,626	6.65%	494,009	5.23%
Total Polled	40,235	77.73%	400,463	81.51%	9,449,878	76.03%
Registered Electors	51,762		491,288		12,428,762	

=== 2000 Sri Lankan Parliamentary Election ===
Party	Haputale		Badulla Electoral District		Sri Lanka	
Party	Votes	%	Votes	%	Votes	%
UNP	16,430	46.63%	167,351	46.36%	3,451,765	40.12%
PA	13,699	38.88%	154,172	42.71%	3,899,329	45.33%
CWC	2,975	8.44%	12,092	3.35%	22,985	0.27%
JVP	1,046	2.97%	16,414	4.55%	518,725	6.03%
Other Parties (with < 1%)	613	1.74%	5,935	1.64%	245,839	2.86%
NUA	473	1.34%	5,052	1.40%	185,593	2.16%
Valid Votes	35,236	N/A	361,016	N/A	8,602,617	N/A

=== 1994 Sri Lankan Parliamentary Election ===
Party	Haputale		Badulla Electoral District		Sri Lanka	
Party	Votes	%	Votes	%	Votes	%
UNP	19,574	56.10%	182,131	54.04%	3,498,370	44.04%
PA	14,491	41.53%	146,546	43.48%	3,887,805	48.94%
Other Parties (with < 1%)	478	1.37%	5,781	1.72%	206,815	2.60%
IND2	349	1.00%	2,601	0.77%	16,690	0.21%
Valid Votes	34,892	90.23%	337,059	92.19%	7,943,688	95.20%
Rejected Votes	3,780	9.77%	28,540	7.81%	400,395	4.80%
Total Polled	38,672	79.16%	365,599	82.23%	8,344,095	74.75%
Registered Electors	48,853		444,632		11,163,064	

=== 1989 Sri Lankan Parliamentary Election ===
Party	Haputale		Badulla Electoral District		Sri Lanka	
Party	Votes	%	Votes	%	Votes	%
UNP	11,495	58.16%	135,089	58.97%	2,838,005	50.71%
SLFP	7,444	37.67%	81,011	35.36%	1,785,369	31.90%
ELJP	398	2.01%	5,589	2.44%	67,723	1.21%
USA	333	1.68%	5,712	2.49%	141,983	2.54%
Other Parties (with < 1%)	93	0.47%	1,693	0.74%	90,480	1.62%
Valid Votes	19,763	92.91%	229,094	92.08%	5,596,468	93.87%
Rejected Votes	1,509	7.09%	19,704	7.92%	365,563	6.13%
Total Polled	21,272	70.78%	248,798	75.55%	5,962,031	63.60%
Registered Electors	30,052		329,321		9,374,164	

== Demographics ==
=== Ethnicity ===
The Haputale Polling Division has a Sinhalese majority (53.3%) and a significant Indian Tamil population (37.7%) . In comparison, the Badulla Electoral District (which contains the Haputale Polling Division) has a Sinhalese majority (73.0%) and a significant Indian Tamil population (18.5%)

Ethnicity in Haputale
1. Sinhalese (53.3%)
2. Indian Tamil (37.7%)
3. Moor (4.40%)
4. Sri Lankan Tamil (4.20%)
5. Other (0.50%)

=== Religion ===
The Haputale Polling Division has a Buddhist majority (52.6%) and a significant Hindu population (38.6%) . In comparison, the Badulla Electoral District (which contains the Haputale Polling Division) has a Buddhist majority (72.6%) and a significant Hindu population (19.3%)

Religion in Haputale
1. Buddhist (52.6%)
2. Hindu (38.6%)
3. Muslim (4.70%)
4. Roman Catholic (2.80%)
5. Other Christian (1.20%)
6. Other (0.00%)
