= Ambika Samuel =

Sri Lankan politician and social activist

Hon. Ambika Samuel MP
- අම්භිකා සැමුවෙල්

Member of Parliament for Badulla District
- Incumbent
- Assumed office 21 November 2024

Personal details
- Party: National People's Power
- Other political affiliations: Janatha Vimukthi Peramuna

Ambika Samuel is a Sri Lankan politician and Member of Parliament. She became popular in social media for her bold stance and activism against corrupt tea estate owners. Following her election in 2024, Samuel became the first Indian Tamil woman to be elected to the Parliament of Sri Lanka.

== Early life and education ==
Samuel was born to an Indian Tamil family in Sri Lanka, who are also known as Malayaga Tamils. Her family was relatively poor, and frequently had to deal with poverty. Her parents were tea plantation workers, a common line of work for many Malayaga Tamils.

Samuel pursued her primary education at the Haputhale Tamil Primary School. While pursuing her GCE Advanced Levels in political science, she began to take an interest in Marxism. She pursued her higher education at Haputhale Central College. After completing her higher education, she began engaging in social activism with the aim of serving her community.

== Political career ==
Samuel joined politics with the intention representing and standing up for the Malayaga Tamil community against corrupt tea estate owners, who held significant power and authority over affairs related to tea production and picking. Early in her political career, Samuel faced jeopardy and significant opposition from certain influential tea estate owners. Tea estate owners and politicians from the Central Province, notably the Thondaman political family, held significant control over the tea industry and by extent the Malayaga Tamil community.

Samuel received extensive training under Malayagam 200 project. She was appointed to the Divisional Executive Council and later received an appointment letter to join the Haputhale Constituency Executive Council. She was also appointed to serve in the Haputhale District Executive Committee, and worked for the Education Cooperative Society.

In the 2024 parliamentary elections, Samuel was one of the National People's Power's candidates in the Badulla Electoral District. She was successfully elected, obtaining 58,201 votes. Upon her election, Samuel became both the first Malayaga Tamil woman to be elected to parliament and the first female Tamil MP to be elected from the Badulla District.
