= K. Velayudam =

Sri Lankan politician

Hon. K. Velayudam MP MPC
- கே. வேலாயுதம்

State Minister of Plantation Industries
- In office 2015–2015

Member of Parliament for Badulla District
- In office 2001–2004
- In office 2014–2015
- Preceded by: Harin Fernando

Member of the Uva Provincial Council for Badulla District
- In office 1988–2001
- In office 2004–2014

Personal details
- Born: 6 April 1950
- Died: 13 October 2015 (aged 65) Chennai, India
- Party: United National Party
- Other political affiliations: United National Front for Good Governance
- Occupation: Trade unionist

Karuppaiah Velayudam (Tamil: கருப்பையா வேலாயுதம்; 6 April 1950 – 13 October 2015) was a Sri Lankan trade unionist, politician and state minister.

== Early life ==
Velayudam was born on 6 April 1950.

== Career ==
Velayudam started his trade union career as a grassroots level organizer for the Lanka Jathika Estate Workers Union (LJEWU), a trade union representing tea, rubber and other plantation workers. The LJEWU is affiliated to the United National Party (UNP). He held several positions at the LJEWU before being appointed its Director Workers Education in 1982, a position he held until 2002. He was elected general-secretary of the union in 2003 at its 23rd Delegate Convention. Velayudam became general-secretary of the National Trade Union Federation (NTUF), of which the LJEWU is a member, in 2005. He became interim president of NTUF in 2008 before being elected president in October 2011 at its second congress.

Velayudam had been a member of Uva Provincial Council (UPC) since its creation in 1988. Following the death of Percy Samaraweera he became the UNP's chief ministerial candidate in Uva during the 1999 provincial council election but the UNP lost control of the council to the People's Alliance. Velayudam contested the 2001 parliamentary election as one of the United National Front's (UNF) candidates in Badulla District. He was elected and entered Parliament. He stood for re-election at the 2004 parliamentary election as one of the UNF's candidates in Badulla District but failed to get elected after coming seventh among the UNF candidates.

Velayudam contested the 2004 provincial council election as one of the UNP's candidates in Badulla District and was re-elected to the UPC. He was re-elected at the 2009 provincial council election. He contested the 2010 parliamentary election as one of the UNF's candidates in Badulla District but again failed to get elected after coming third among the UNF candidates. However, he re-entered Parliament on 8 August 2014 following the resignation of Harin Fernando. After the 2015 presidential election he was appointed State Minister of Plantation Industries by newly elected President Maithripala Sirisena.

Velayudam did not contest the 2015 parliamentary election but was instead placed on the United National Front for Good Governance's (UNFGG) list of National List candidates. However, after the election he was not appointed to the National List. He was the chief UNP organiser for Passara.

Velayudam died on 13 October 2015 at a private hospital in Chennai, India.

== Electoral history ==
Electoral history of K. Velayudam
Election	Constituency	Party	Votes	Result
1988 provincial	Badulla District			Elected
1993 provincial	Badulla District			Elected
1999 provincial	Badulla District			Elected
2001 parliamentary	Badulla District	UNF	40,753	Elected
2004 parliamentary	Badulla District	UNF	36,328	Not elected
2004 provincial	Badulla District	UNP	15,423	Elected
2009 provincial	Badulla District	UNP	14,870	Elected
2010 parliamentary	Badulla District	UNF	25,056	Not elected
