= Sudath Balagalla =

Sri Lankan politician

Sudath Balagalla is a Sri Lankan politician. He was elected to the Sri Lankan Parliament from Badulla Electoral District as a member of the National People's Power.
