= Hali Ela Polling Division =

Hali Ela
- Polling Division
- Interactive map of Hali Ela
- Coordinates: 6.949504°N 81.015760°E
- Country: Sri Lanka
- Province: Uva Province, Sri Lanka
- Electoral District: Badulla Electoral District

Area
  - Total: 158.16 km^{2} (61.07 sq mi)

Population (2012)
  - Total: 90,571
  - Density: 573/km^{2} (1,480/sq mi)
- ISO 3166 code: EC-19E

The Hali Ela Polling Division is a Polling Division in the Badulla Electoral District, in the Uva Province, Sri Lanka.

== Presidential Election Results ==
=== Summary ===
The winner of Hali Ela has matched the final country result 5 out of 8 times. Hence, Hali Ela is a Weak Bellwether for Presidential Elections.

Year	Hali Ela	Badulla Electoral District	MAE %	Sri Lanka	MAE %
2019	NDF	SLPP	3.70%	SLPP	6.50%
2015	NDF	NDF	2.13%	NDF	0.43%
2010	UPFA	UPFA	2.37%	UPFA	6.85%
2005	UNP	UNP	0.17%	UPFA	5.02%
1999	UNP	UNP	0.62%	PA	4.11%
1994	PA	PA	1.38%	PA	5.26%
1988	UNP	UNP	1.44%	UNP	7.01%
1982	UNP	UNP	3.23%	UNP	1.49%
Matches/Mean MAE	5/8	6/8	1.88%	8/8	4.58%

=== 2019 Sri Lankan Presidential Election ===
Party	Hali Ela		Badulla Electoral District		Sri Lanka	
Party	Votes	%	Votes	%	Votes	%
NDF	28,502	48.68%	251,706	44.92%	5,564,239	41.99%
SLPP	26,485	45.24%	276,211	49.29%	6,924,255	52.25%
Other Parties (with < 1%)	2,181	3.73%	17,622	3.14%	345,452	2.61%
NMPP	1,379	2.36%	14,806	2.64%	418,553	3.16%
Valid Votes	58,547	98.61%	560,345	98.77%	13,252,499	98.99%
Rejected Votes	824	1.39%	6,978	1.23%	135,452	1.01%
Total Polled	59,371	85.09%	567,323	86.25%	13,387,951	83.71%
Registered Electors	69,776		657,766		15,992,568	

=== 2015 Sri Lankan Presidential Election ===
Party	Hali Ela		Badulla Electoral District		Sri Lanka	
Party	Votes	%	Votes	%	Votes	%
NDF	27,797	51.17%	249,524	49.21%	6,217,162	51.28%
UPFA	25,420	46.80%	249,243	49.15%	5,768,090	47.58%
Other Parties (with < 1%)	1,105	2.03%	8,303	1.64%	138,200	1.14%
Valid Votes	54,322	98.12%	507,070	98.47%	12,123,452	98.85%
Rejected Votes	1,040	1.88%	7,871	1.53%	140,925	1.15%
Total Polled	55,362	79.19%	514,941	79.51%	12,264,377	78.69%
Registered Electors	69,909		647,628		15,585,942	

=== 2010 Sri Lankan Presidential Election ===
Party	Hali Ela		Badulla Electoral District		Sri Lanka	
Party	Votes	%	Votes	%	Votes	%
UPFA	23,758	50.65%	237,579	53.23%	6,015,934	57.88%
NDF	21,946	46.79%	198,835	44.55%	4,173,185	40.15%
Other Parties (with < 1%)	1,202	2.56%	9,880	2.21%	204,494	1.97%
Valid Votes	46,906	98.60%	446,294	98.66%	10,393,613	99.03%
Rejected Votes	665	1.40%	6,083	1.34%	101,838	0.97%
Total Polled	47,571	75.36%	452,377	75.62%	10,495,451	66.70%
Registered Electors	63,124		598,190		15,734,587	

=== 2005 Sri Lankan Presidential Election ===
Party	Hali Ela		Badulla Electoral District		Sri Lanka	
Party	Votes	%	Votes	%	Votes	%
UNP	23,638	53.11%	226,582	53.11%	4,706,366	48.43%
UPFA	19,946	44.81%	192,734	45.18%	4,887,152	50.29%
Other Parties (with < 1%)	927	2.08%	7,283	1.71%	123,521	1.27%
Valid Votes	44,511	98.27%	426,599	98.43%	9,717,039	98.88%
Rejected Votes	785	1.73%	6,825	1.57%	109,869	1.12%
Total Polled	45,296	78.23%	433,424	78.67%	9,826,908	69.51%
Registered Electors	57,900		550,926		14,136,979	

=== 1999 Sri Lankan Presidential Election ===
Party	Hali Ela		Badulla Electoral District		Sri Lanka	
Party	Votes	%	Votes	%	Votes	%
UNP	18,382	47.24%	172,884	47.97%	3,602,748	42.71%
PA	18,253	46.91%	167,000	46.33%	4,312,157	51.12%
JVP	1,384	3.56%	12,025	3.34%	343,927	4.08%
Other Parties (with < 1%)	894	2.30%	8,512	2.36%	176,679	2.09%
Valid Votes	38,913	96.45%	360,421	97.04%	8,435,754	97.69%
Rejected Votes	1,433	3.55%	10,979	2.96%	199,536	2.31%
Total Polled	40,346	77.59%	371,400	78.25%	8,635,290	72.17%
Registered Electors	51,998		474,610		11,965,536	

=== 1994 Sri Lankan Presidential Election ===
Party	Hali Ela		Badulla Electoral District		Sri Lanka	
Party	Votes	%	Votes	%	Votes	%
PA	20,090	56.56%	182,810	55.27%	4,709,205	62.28%
UNP	14,430	40.62%	139,611	42.21%	2,715,283	35.91%
Other Parties (with < 1%)	511	1.44%	4,504	1.36%	78,152	1.03%
Ind 2	491	1.38%	3,847	1.16%	58,888	0.78%
Valid Votes	35,522	95.02%	330,772	95.91%	7,561,526	98.03%
Rejected Votes	1,861	4.98%	14,093	4.09%	151,706	1.97%
Total Polled	37,383	76.59%	344,865	77.47%	7,713,232	69.12%
Registered Electors	48,807		445,146		11,158,880	

=== 1988 Sri Lankan Presidential Election ===
Party	Hali Ela		Badulla Electoral District		Sri Lanka	
Party	Votes	%	Votes	%	Votes	%
UNP	10,005	58.40%	80,779	60.09%	2,569,199	50.43%
SLFP	6,585	38.43%	50,223	37.36%	2,289,857	44.95%
SLMP	543	3.17%	3,422	2.55%	235,701	4.63%
Valid Votes	17,133	97.35%	134,424	97.62%	5,094,754	98.24%
Rejected Votes	466	2.65%	3,276	2.38%	91,499	1.76%
Total Polled	17,599	49.76%	137,700	44.21%	5,186,256	55.87%
Registered Electors	35,367		311,473		9,283,143	

=== 1982 Sri Lankan Presidential Election ===
Party	Hali Ela		Badulla Electoral District		Sri Lanka	
Party	Votes	%	Votes	%	Votes	%
UNP	14,196	55.07%	141,062	58.67%	3,450,815	52.93%
SLFP	10,249	39.76%	88,462	36.79%	2,546,348	39.05%
JVP	1,011	3.92%	7,713	3.21%	273,428	4.19%
Other Parties (with < 1%)	322	1.25%	3,203	1.33%	249,460	3.83%
Valid Votes	25,778	98.66%	240,440	98.77%	6,520,156	98.78%
Rejected Votes	351	1.34%	2,982	1.23%	80,470	1.22%
Total Polled	26,129	85.39%	243,422	85.47%	6,600,626	80.15%
Registered Electors	30,598		284,801		8,235,358	

== Parliamentary Election Results ==
=== Summary ===
The winner of Hali Ela has matched the final country result 5 out of 7 times. Hence, Hali Ela is a Weak Bellwether for Parliamentary Elections.

Year	Hali Ela	Badulla Electoral District	MAE %	Sri Lanka	MAE %
2015	UNP	UNP	2.44%	UNP	8.37%
2010	UPFA	UPFA	0.67%	UPFA	1.89%
2004	UNP	UNP	1.13%	UPFA	5.57%
2001	UNP	UNP	1.32%	UNP	3.41%
2000	PA	UNP	1.94%	PA	2.11%
1994	UNP	UNP	1.91%	PA	8.90%
1989	UNP	UNP	1.26%	UNP	4.32%
Matches/Mean MAE	5/7	4/7	1.52%	7/7	4.94%

=== 2015 Sri Lankan Parliamentary Election ===
Party	Hali Ela		Badulla Electoral District		Sri Lanka	
Party	Votes	%	Votes	%	Votes	%
UNP	28,486	57.53%	258,844	54.82%	5,098,916	45.77%
UPFA	17,599	35.54%	179,459	38.01%	4,732,664	42.48%
JVP	2,070	4.18%	21,445	4.54%	544,154	4.88%
CWC	1,167	2.36%	10,259	2.17%	17,107	0.15%
Other Parties (with < 1%)	196	0.40%	2,159	0.46%	76,945	0.69%
Valid Votes	49,518	93.81%	472,166	95.03%	11,140,333	95.35%
Rejected Votes	3,204	6.07%	24,167	4.86%	516,926	4.42%
Total Polled	52,785	75.51%	496,849	80.07%	11,684,111	77.66%
Registered Electors	69,909		620,486		15,044,490	

=== 2010 Sri Lankan Parliamentary Election ===
Party	Hali Ela		Badulla Electoral District		Sri Lanka	
Party	Votes	%	Votes	%	Votes	%
UPFA	21,341	59.06%	203,689	58.25%	4,846,388	60.38%
UNP	11,858	32.81%	112,886	32.28%	2,357,057	29.37%
DNA	1,544	4.27%	15,768	4.51%	441,251	5.50%
UPF	1,173	3.25%	11,481	3.28%	24,670	0.31%
Other Parties (with < 1%)	221	0.61%	5,854	1.67%	28,670	0.36%
Valid Votes	36,137	92.59%	349,678	93.54%	8,026,322	96.03%
Rejected Votes	2,893	7.41%	24,169	6.46%	581,465	6.96%
Total Polled	39,030	61.83%	373,847	62.46%	8,358,246	59.29%
Registered Electors	63,124		598,521		14,097,690	

=== 2004 Sri Lankan Parliamentary Election ===
Party	Hali Ela		Badulla Electoral District		Sri Lanka	
Party	Votes	%	Votes	%	Votes	%
UNP	19,125	50.20%	181,705	49.09%	3,486,792	37.73%
UPFA	17,926	47.05%	178,634	48.26%	4,223,126	45.70%
JHU	725	1.90%	6,932	1.87%	552,723	5.98%
Other Parties (with < 1%)	324	0.85%	2,907	0.79%	57,589	0.62%
Valid Votes	38,100	90.74%	370,178	92.47%	9,241,931	94.52%
Rejected Votes	3,886	9.26%	30,159	7.53%	534,452	5.47%
Total Polled	41,986	75.33%	400,337	78.33%	9,777,821	75.74%
Registered Electors	55,733		511,115		12,909,631	

=== 2001 Sri Lankan Parliamentary Election ===
Party	Hali Ela		Badulla Electoral District		Sri Lanka	
Party	Votes	%	Votes	%	Votes	%
UNP	20,754	52.05%	201,173	53.81%	4,086,026	45.62%
PA	15,137	37.96%	138,443	37.03%	3,330,815	37.19%
JVP	2,775	6.96%	26,820	7.17%	815,353	9.10%
IND3	872	2.19%	5,065	1.35%	6,161	0.07%
Other Parties (with < 1%)	339	0.85%	2,336	0.62%	73,230	0.82%
Valid Votes	39,877	92.90%	373,837	93.35%	8,955,844	94.77%
Rejected Votes	3,047	7.10%	26,626	6.65%	494,009	5.23%
Total Polled	42,924	78.98%	400,463	81.51%	9,449,878	76.03%
Registered Electors	54,349		491,288		12,428,762	

=== 2000 Sri Lankan Parliamentary Election ===
Party	Hali Ela		Badulla Electoral District		Sri Lanka	
Party	Votes	%	Votes	%	Votes	%
PA	17,588	45.50%	154,172	42.71%	3,899,329	45.33%
UNP	17,338	44.86%	167,351	46.36%	3,451,765	40.12%
JVP	1,802	4.66%	16,414	4.55%	518,725	6.03%
Other Parties (with < 1%)	980	2.54%	10,987	3.04%	431,432	5.02%
CWC	944	2.44%	12,092	3.35%	22,985	0.27%
Valid Votes	38,652	N/A	361,016	N/A	8,602,617	N/A

=== 1994 Sri Lankan Parliamentary Election ===
Party	Hali Ela		Badulla Electoral District		Sri Lanka	
Party	Votes	%	Votes	%	Votes	%
UNP	20,677	56.04%	182,131	54.04%	3,498,370	44.04%
PA	15,341	41.58%	146,546	43.48%	3,887,805	48.94%
SLPF	465	1.26%	3,555	1.05%	90,078	1.13%
Other Parties (with < 1%)	411	1.11%	4,827	1.43%	133,427	1.68%
Valid Votes	36,894	91.52%	337,059	92.19%	7,943,688	95.20%
Rejected Votes	3,419	8.48%	28,540	7.81%	400,395	4.80%
Total Polled	40,313	82.60%	365,599	82.23%	8,344,095	74.75%
Registered Electors	48,807		444,632		11,163,064	

=== 1989 Sri Lankan Parliamentary Election ===
Party	Hali Ela		Badulla Electoral District		Sri Lanka	
Party	Votes	%	Votes	%	Votes	%
UNP	14,240	57.62%	135,089	58.97%	2,838,005	50.71%
SLFP	8,454	34.21%	81,011	35.36%	1,785,369	31.90%
USA	1,122	4.54%	5,712	2.49%	141,983	2.54%
ELJP	673	2.72%	5,589	2.44%	67,723	1.21%
Other Parties (with < 1%)	223	0.90%	1,693	0.74%	90,480	1.62%
Valid Votes	24,712	91.73%	229,094	92.08%	5,596,468	93.87%
Rejected Votes	2,228	8.27%	19,704	7.92%	365,563	6.13%
Total Polled	26,940	77.71%	248,798	75.55%	5,962,031	63.60%
Registered Electors	34,666		329,321		9,374,164	

== Demographics ==
=== Ethnicity ===
The Hali Ela Polling Division has a Sinhalese majority (64.5%) and a significant Indian Tamil population (27.9%) . In comparison, the Badulla Electoral District (which contains the Hali Ela Polling Division) has a Sinhalese majority (73.0%) and a significant Indian Tamil population (18.5%)

Ethnicity in Hali Ela
1. Sinhalese (64.5%)
2. Indian Tamil (27.9%)
3. Moor (3.80%)
4. Sri Lankan Tamil (3.00%)
5. Other (0.80%)

=== Religion ===
The Hali Ela Polling Division has a Buddhist majority (64.2%) and a significant Hindu population (29.0%) . In comparison, the Badulla Electoral District (which contains the Hali Ela Polling Division) has a Buddhist majority (72.6%) and a significant Hindu population (19.3%)

Religion in Hali Ela
1. Buddhist (64.2%)
2. Hindu (29.0%)
3. Muslim (4.60%)
4. Roman Catholic (1.40%)
5. Other (0.90%)
