= Viyaluwa Polling Division =

Viyaluwa
- Polling Division
- Coordinates: 7.107242°N 81.024663°E
- Country: Sri Lanka
- Province: Uva Province, Sri Lanka
- Electoral District: Badulla Electoral District

Area
  - Total: 317.28 km^{2} (122.50 sq mi)

Population (2012)
  - Total: 65,365
  - Density: 206/km^{2} (530/sq mi)
- ISO 3166 code: EC-19B

The Viyaluwa Polling Division is a Polling Division in the Badulla Electoral District, in the Uva Province, Sri Lanka.

== Presidential Election Results ==
=== Summary ===
The winner of Viyaluwa has matched the final country result 7 out of 8 times. Hence, Viyaluwa is a Strong Bellwether for Presidential Elections.

Year	Viyaluwa	Badulla Electoral District	MAE %	Sri Lanka	MAE %
2019	SLPP	SLPP	6.91%	SLPP	4.16%
2015	UPFA	NDF	10.51%	NDF	12.38%
2010	UPFA	UPFA	7.56%	UPFA	3.10%
2005	UPFA	UNP	4.48%	UPFA	0.64%
1999	PA	UNP	1.34%	PA	3.47%
1994	PA	PA	0.81%	PA	5.89%
1988	UNP	UNP	7.72%	UNP	1.54%
1982	UNP	UNP	7.45%	UNP	3.46%
Matches/Mean MAE	7/8	6/8	5.85%	8/8	4.33%

=== 2019 Sri Lankan Presidential Election ===
Party	Viyaluwa		Badulla Electoral District		Sri Lanka	
Party	Votes	%	Votes	%	Votes	%
SLPP	24,401	56.66%	276,211	49.29%	6,924,255	52.25%
NDF	16,227	37.68%	251,706	44.92%	5,564,239	41.99%
Other Parties (with < 1%)	1,639	3.81%	17,622	3.14%	345,452	2.61%
NMPP	795	1.85%	14,806	2.64%	418,553	3.16%
Valid Votes	43,062	98.80%	560,345	98.77%	13,252,499	98.99%
Rejected Votes	521	1.20%	6,978	1.23%	135,452	1.01%
Total Polled	43,583	85.53%	567,323	86.25%	13,387,951	83.71%
Registered Electors	50,956		657,766		15,992,568	

=== 2015 Sri Lankan Presidential Election ===
Party	Viyaluwa		Badulla Electoral District		Sri Lanka	
Party	Votes	%	Votes	%	Votes	%
UPFA	23,518	59.72%	249,243	49.15%	5,768,090	47.58%
NDF	15,128	38.42%	249,524	49.21%	6,217,162	51.28%
Other Parties (with < 1%)	733	1.86%	8,303	1.64%	138,200	1.14%
Valid Votes	39,379	97.96%	507,070	98.47%	12,123,452	98.85%
Rejected Votes	822	2.04%	7,871	1.53%	140,925	1.15%
Total Polled	40,201	78.37%	514,941	79.51%	12,264,377	78.69%
Registered Electors	51,295		647,628		15,585,942	

=== 2010 Sri Lankan Presidential Election ===
Party	Viyaluwa		Badulla Electoral District		Sri Lanka	
Party	Votes	%	Votes	%	Votes	%
UPFA	20,816	60.75%	237,579	53.23%	6,015,934	57.88%
NDF	12,529	36.56%	198,835	44.55%	4,173,185	40.15%
Other Parties (with < 1%)	922	2.69%	9,880	2.21%	204,494	1.97%
Valid Votes	34,267	96.98%	446,294	98.66%	10,393,613	99.03%
Rejected Votes	1,068	3.02%	6,083	1.34%	101,838	0.97%
Total Polled	35,335	73.26%	452,377	75.62%	10,495,451	66.70%
Registered Electors	48,231		598,190		15,734,587	

=== 2005 Sri Lankan Presidential Election ===
Party	Viyaluwa		Badulla Electoral District		Sri Lanka	
Party	Votes	%	Votes	%	Votes	%
UPFA	16,803	49.28%	192,734	45.18%	4,887,152	50.29%
UNP	16,423	48.17%	226,582	53.11%	4,706,366	48.43%
Other Parties (with < 1%)	868	2.55%	7,283	1.71%	123,521	1.27%
Valid Votes	34,094	98.24%	426,599	98.43%	9,717,039	98.88%
Rejected Votes	611	1.76%	6,825	1.57%	109,869	1.12%
Total Polled	34,705	77.04%	433,424	78.67%	9,826,908	69.51%
Registered Electors	45,049		550,926		14,136,979	

=== 1999 Sri Lankan Presidential Election ===
Party	Viyaluwa		Badulla Electoral District		Sri Lanka	
Party	Votes	%	Votes	%	Votes	%
PA	13,336	47.01%	167,000	46.33%	4,312,157	51.12%
UNP	13,003	45.84%	172,884	47.97%	3,602,748	42.71%
Other Parties (with < 1%)	1,073	3.78%	8,512	2.36%	176,679	2.09%
JVP	957	3.37%	12,025	3.34%	343,927	4.08%
Valid Votes	28,369	96.73%	360,421	97.04%	8,435,754	97.69%
Rejected Votes	958	3.27%	10,979	2.96%	199,536	2.31%
Total Polled	29,327	75.24%	371,400	78.25%	8,635,290	72.17%
Registered Electors	38,978		474,610		11,965,536	

=== 1994 Sri Lankan Presidential Election ===
Party	Viyaluwa		Badulla Electoral District		Sri Lanka	
Party	Votes	%	Votes	%	Votes	%
PA	15,304	55.68%	182,810	55.27%	4,709,205	62.28%
UNP	11,227	40.84%	139,611	42.21%	2,715,283	35.91%
Other Parties (with < 1%)	500	1.82%	4,504	1.36%	78,152	1.03%
Ind 2	456	1.66%	3,847	1.16%	58,888	0.78%
Valid Votes	27,487	96.48%	330,772	95.91%	7,561,526	98.03%
Rejected Votes	1,002	3.52%	14,093	4.09%	151,706	1.97%
Total Polled	28,489	78.39%	344,865	77.47%	7,713,232	69.12%
Registered Electors	36,342		445,146		11,158,880	

=== 1988 Sri Lankan Presidential Election ===
Party	Viyaluwa		Badulla Electoral District		Sri Lanka	
Party	Votes	%	Votes	%	Votes	%
UNP	6,397	52.49%	80,779	60.09%	2,569,199	50.43%
SLFP	5,575	45.75%	50,223	37.36%	2,289,857	44.95%
SLMP	214	1.76%	3,422	2.55%	235,701	4.63%
Valid Votes	12,186	97.71%	134,424	97.62%	5,094,754	98.24%
Rejected Votes	285	2.29%	3,276	2.38%	91,499	1.76%
Total Polled	12,471	100.00%	137,700	44.21%	5,186,256	55.87%
Registered Electors	12,471		311,473		9,283,143	

=== 1982 Sri Lankan Presidential Election ===
Party	Viyaluwa		Badulla Electoral District		Sri Lanka	
Party	Votes	%	Votes	%	Votes	%
UNP	12,251	51.69%	141,062	58.67%	3,450,815	52.93%
SLFP	10,836	45.72%	88,462	36.79%	2,546,348	39.05%
Other Parties (with < 1%)	374	1.58%	3,203	1.33%	249,460	3.83%
JVP	242	1.02%	7,713	3.21%	273,428	4.19%
Valid Votes	23,703	98.80%	240,440	98.77%	6,520,156	98.78%
Rejected Votes	289	1.20%	2,982	1.23%	80,470	1.22%
Total Polled	23,992	87.39%	243,422	85.47%	6,600,626	80.15%
Registered Electors	27,455		284,801		8,235,358	

== Parliamentary Election Results ==
=== Summary ===
The winner of Viyaluwa has matched the final country result 6 out of 7 times. Hence, Viyaluwa is a Strong Bellwether for Parliamentary Elections.

Year	Viyaluwa	Badulla Electoral District	MAE %	Sri Lanka	MAE %
2015	UNP	UNP	7.08%	UNP	3.24%
2010	UPFA	UPFA	6.60%	UPFA	4.52%
2004	UPFA	UNP	3.76%	UPFA	6.49%
2001	UNP	UNP	3.11%	UNP	4.11%
2000	PA	UNP	2.00%	PA	3.01%
1994	UNP	UNP	2.10%	PA	5.03%
1989	UNP	UNP	1.23%	UNP	5.50%
Matches/Mean MAE	6/7	4/7	3.70%	7/7	4.55%

=== 2015 Sri Lankan Parliamentary Election ===
Party	Viyaluwa		Badulla Electoral District		Sri Lanka	
Party	Votes	%	Votes	%	Votes	%
UNP	17,092	48.37%	258,844	54.82%	5,098,916	45.77%
UPFA	16,639	47.08%	179,459	38.01%	4,732,664	42.48%
JVP	1,076	3.04%	21,445	4.54%	544,154	4.88%
CWC	380	1.08%	10,259	2.17%	17,107	0.15%
Other Parties (with < 1%)	152	0.43%	2,159	0.46%	76,945	0.69%
Valid Votes	35,339	93.71%	472,166	95.03%	11,140,333	95.35%
Rejected Votes	2,309	6.12%	24,167	4.86%	516,926	4.42%
Total Polled	37,712	73.52%	496,849	80.07%	11,684,111	77.66%
Registered Electors	51,295		620,486		15,044,490	

=== 2010 Sri Lankan Parliamentary Election ===
Party	Viyaluwa		Badulla Electoral District		Sri Lanka	
Party	Votes	%	Votes	%	Votes	%
UPFA	16,967	66.82%	203,689	58.25%	4,846,388	60.38%
UNP	7,046	27.75%	112,886	32.28%	2,357,057	29.37%
DNA	705	2.78%	15,768	4.51%	441,251	5.50%
UPF	423	1.67%	11,481	3.28%	24,670	0.31%
Other Parties (with < 1%)	252	0.99%	5,854	1.67%	28,670	0.36%
Valid Votes	25,393	92.24%	349,678	93.54%	8,026,322	96.03%
Rejected Votes	2,135	7.76%	24,169	6.46%	581,465	6.96%
Total Polled	27,528	57.08%	373,847	62.46%	8,358,246	59.29%
Registered Electors	48,231		598,521		14,097,690	

=== 2004 Sri Lankan Parliamentary Election ===
Party	Viyaluwa		Badulla Electoral District		Sri Lanka	
Party	Votes	%	Votes	%	Votes	%
UPFA	14,805	52.60%	178,634	48.26%	4,223,126	45.70%
UNP	12,874	45.74%	181,705	49.09%	3,486,792	37.73%
Other Parties (with < 1%)	469	1.67%	9,839	2.66%	610,312	6.60%
Valid Votes	28,148	91.68%	370,178	92.47%	9,241,931	94.52%
Rejected Votes	2,556	8.32%	30,159	7.53%	534,452	5.47%
Total Polled	30,704	71.54%	400,337	78.33%	9,777,821	75.74%
Registered Electors	42,921		511,115		12,909,631	

=== 2001 Sri Lankan Parliamentary Election ===
Party	Viyaluwa		Badulla Electoral District		Sri Lanka	
Party	Votes	%	Votes	%	Votes	%
UNP	14,792	50.94%	201,173	53.81%	4,086,026	45.62%
PA	11,949	41.15%	138,443	37.03%	3,330,815	37.19%
JVP	1,962	6.76%	26,820	7.17%	815,353	9.10%
Other Parties (with < 1%)	336	1.16%	7,401	1.98%	79,391	0.89%
Valid Votes	29,039	91.84%	373,837	93.35%	8,955,844	94.77%
Rejected Votes	2,579	8.16%	26,626	6.65%	494,009	5.23%
Total Polled	31,618	76.77%	400,463	81.51%	9,449,878	76.03%
Registered Electors	41,188		491,288		12,428,762	

=== 2000 Sri Lankan Parliamentary Election ===
Party	Viyaluwa		Badulla Electoral District		Sri Lanka	
Party	Votes	%	Votes	%	Votes	%
PA	13,082	46.52%	154,172	42.71%	3,899,329	45.33%
UNP	12,880	45.81%	167,351	46.36%	3,451,765	40.12%
JVP	1,131	4.02%	16,414	4.55%	518,725	6.03%
Other Parties (with < 1%)	684	2.43%	10,987	3.04%	431,432	5.02%
CWC	342	1.22%	12,092	3.35%	22,985	0.27%
Valid Votes	28,119	N/A	361,016	N/A	8,602,617	N/A

=== 1994 Sri Lankan Parliamentary Election ===
Party	Viyaluwa		Badulla Electoral District		Sri Lanka	
Party	Votes	%	Votes	%	Votes	%
UNP	14,340	52.26%	182,131	54.04%	3,498,370	44.04%
PA	12,646	46.08%	146,546	43.48%	3,887,805	48.94%
Other Parties (with < 1%)	455	1.66%	8,382	2.49%	223,505	2.81%
Valid Votes	27,441	90.91%	337,059	92.19%	7,943,688	95.20%
Rejected Votes	2,744	9.09%	28,540	7.81%	400,395	4.80%
Total Polled	30,185	83.06%	365,599	82.23%	8,344,095	74.75%
Registered Electors	36,342		444,632		11,163,064	

=== 1989 Sri Lankan Parliamentary Election ===
Party	Viyaluwa		Badulla Electoral District		Sri Lanka	
Party	Votes	%	Votes	%	Votes	%
UNP	12,581	58.11%	135,089	58.97%	2,838,005	50.71%
SLFP	8,067	37.26%	81,011	35.36%	1,785,369	31.90%
USA	673	3.11%	5,712	2.49%	141,983	2.54%
ELJP	244	1.13%	5,589	2.44%	67,723	1.21%
Other Parties (with < 1%)	86	0.40%	1,693	0.74%	90,480	1.62%
Valid Votes	21,651	90.59%	229,094	92.08%	5,596,468	93.87%
Rejected Votes	2,248	9.41%	19,704	7.92%	365,563	6.13%
Total Polled	23,899	79.21%	248,798	75.55%	5,962,031	63.60%
Registered Electors	30,170		329,321		9,374,164	

== Demographics ==
=== Ethnicity ===
The Viyaluwa Polling Division has a Sinhalese majority (87.8%) . In comparison, the Badulla Electoral District (which contains the Viyaluwa Polling Division) has a Sinhalese majority (73.0%) and a significant Indian Tamil population (18.5%)

Ethnicity in Viyaluwa
1. Sinhalese (87.8%)
2. Indian Tamil (9.50%)
3. Moor (1.30%)
4. Sri Lankan Tamil (1.20%)
5. Other (0.10%)

=== Religion ===
The Viyaluwa Polling Division has a Buddhist majority (87.8%) and a significant Hindu population (10.1%) . In comparison, the Badulla Electoral District (which contains the Viyaluwa Polling Division) has a Buddhist majority (72.6%) and a significant Hindu population (19.3%)

Religion in Viyaluwa
1. Buddhist (87.8%)
2. Hindu (10.1%)
3. Muslim (1.30%)
4. Other (0.80%)
