= Passara Polling Division =

Passara
- Polling Division
- Coordinates: 6.996830°N 81.165491°E
- Country: Sri Lanka
- Province: Uva Province, Sri Lanka
- Electoral District: Badulla Electoral District

Area
  - Total: 262.67 km^{2} (101.42 sq mi)

Population (2012)
  - Total: 80,188
  - Density: 305/km^{2} (790/sq mi)
- ISO 3166 code: EC-19C

The Passara Polling Division is a Polling Division in the Badulla Electoral District, in the Uva Province, Sri Lanka.

== Presidential Election Results ==
=== Summary ===
The winner of Passara has matched the final country result 4 out of 8 times.

Year	Passara	Badulla Electoral District	MAE %	Sri Lanka	MAE %
2019	NDF	SLPP	10.09%	SLPP	12.89%
2015	NDF	NDF	5.62%	NDF	3.82%
2010	NDF	UPFA	8.97%	UPFA	13.50%
2005	UNP	UNP	7.32%	UPFA	12.17%
1999	UNP	UNP	1.31%	PA	5.99%
1994	PA	PA	1.46%	PA	5.21%
1988	UNP	UNP	5.05%	UNP	13.29%
1982	UNP	UNP	0.82%	UNP	4.78%
Matches/Mean MAE	4/8	6/8	5.08%	8/8	8.96%

=== 2019 Sri Lankan Presidential Election ===
Party	Passara		Badulla Electoral District		Sri Lanka	
Party	Votes	%	Votes	%	Votes	%
NDF	28,845	55.61%	251,706	44.92%	5,564,239	41.99%
SLPP	20,038	38.63%	276,211	49.29%	6,924,255	52.25%
Other Parties (with < 1%)	2,273	4.38%	17,622	3.14%	345,452	2.61%
NMPP	714	1.38%	14,806	2.64%	418,553	3.16%
Valid Votes	51,870	98.15%	560,345	98.77%	13,252,499	98.99%
Rejected Votes	979	1.85%	6,978	1.23%	135,452	1.01%
Total Polled	52,849	83.61%	567,323	86.25%	13,387,951	83.71%
Registered Electors	63,210		657,766		15,992,568	

=== 2015 Sri Lankan Presidential Election ===
Party	Passara		Badulla Electoral District		Sri Lanka	
Party	Votes	%	Votes	%	Votes	%
NDF	25,598	54.47%	249,524	49.21%	6,217,162	51.28%
UPFA	20,202	42.99%	249,243	49.15%	5,768,090	47.58%
Other Parties (with < 1%)	1,196	2.54%	8,303	1.64%	138,200	1.14%
Valid Votes	46,996	98.12%	507,070	98.47%	12,123,452	98.85%
Rejected Votes	900	1.88%	7,871	1.53%	140,925	1.15%
Total Polled	47,896	76.15%	514,941	79.51%	12,264,377	78.69%
Registered Electors	62,901		647,628		15,585,942	

=== 2010 Sri Lankan Presidential Election ===
Party	Passara		Badulla Electoral District		Sri Lanka	
Party	Votes	%	Votes	%	Votes	%
NDF	22,601	53.14%	198,835	44.55%	4,173,185	40.15%
UPFA	18,529	43.57%	237,579	53.23%	6,015,934	57.88%
Other Parties (with < 1%)	1,401	3.29%	9,880	2.21%	204,494	1.97%
Valid Votes	42,531	98.34%	446,294	98.66%	10,393,613	99.03%
Rejected Votes	716	1.66%	6,083	1.34%	101,838	0.97%
Total Polled	43,247	72.08%	452,377	75.62%	10,495,451	66.70%
Registered Electors	60,002		598,190		15,734,587	

=== 2005 Sri Lankan Presidential Election ===
Party	Passara		Badulla Electoral District		Sri Lanka	
Party	Votes	%	Votes	%	Votes	%
UNP	25,176	60.68%	226,582	53.11%	4,706,366	48.43%
UPFA	15,717	37.88%	192,734	45.18%	4,887,152	50.29%
Other Parties (with < 1%)	598	1.44%	7,283	1.71%	123,521	1.27%
Valid Votes	41,491	97.94%	426,599	98.43%	9,717,039	98.88%
Rejected Votes	874	2.06%	6,825	1.57%	109,869	1.12%
Total Polled	42,365	77.15%	433,424	78.67%	9,826,908	69.51%
Registered Electors	54,910		550,926		14,136,979	

=== 1999 Sri Lankan Presidential Election ===
Party	Passara		Badulla Electoral District		Sri Lanka	
Party	Votes	%	Votes	%	Votes	%
UNP	18,124	49.83%	172,884	47.97%	3,602,748	42.71%
PA	16,558	45.53%	167,000	46.33%	4,312,157	51.12%
Other Parties (with < 1%)	941	2.59%	8,512	2.36%	176,679	2.09%
JVP	748	2.06%	12,025	3.34%	343,927	4.08%
Valid Votes	36,371	96.75%	360,421	97.04%	8,435,754	97.69%
Rejected Votes	1,222	3.25%	10,979	2.96%	199,536	2.31%
Total Polled	37,593	78.21%	371,400	78.25%	8,635,290	72.17%
Registered Electors	48,066		474,610		11,965,536	

=== 1994 Sri Lankan Presidential Election ===
Party	Passara		Badulla Electoral District		Sri Lanka	
Party	Votes	%	Votes	%	Votes	%
PA	19,303	56.49%	182,810	55.27%	4,709,205	62.28%
UNP	13,793	40.37%	139,611	42.21%	2,715,283	35.91%
Ind 2	556	1.63%	3,847	1.16%	58,888	0.78%
Other Parties (with < 1%)	517	1.51%	4,504	1.36%	78,152	1.03%
Valid Votes	34,169	94.80%	330,772	95.91%	7,561,526	98.03%
Rejected Votes	1,873	5.20%	14,093	4.09%	151,706	1.97%
Total Polled	36,042	78.71%	344,865	77.47%	7,713,232	69.12%
Registered Electors	45,788		445,146		11,158,880	

=== 1988 Sri Lankan Presidential Election ===
Party	Passara		Badulla Electoral District		Sri Lanka	
Party	Votes	%	Votes	%	Votes	%
UNP	7,056	65.42%	80,779	60.09%	2,569,199	50.43%
SLFP	3,500	32.45%	50,223	37.36%	2,289,857	44.95%
SLMP	230	2.13%	3,422	2.55%	235,701	4.63%
Valid Votes	10,786	96.21%	134,424	97.62%	5,094,754	98.24%
Rejected Votes	425	3.79%	3,276	2.38%	91,499	1.76%
Total Polled	11,211	35.58%	137,700	44.21%	5,186,256	55.87%
Registered Electors	31,509		311,473		9,283,143	

=== 1982 Sri Lankan Presidential Election ===
Party	Passara		Badulla Electoral District		Sri Lanka	
Party	Votes	%	Votes	%	Votes	%
UNP	14,400	59.96%	141,062	58.67%	3,450,815	52.93%
SLFP	8,830	36.76%	88,462	36.79%	2,546,348	39.05%
Other Parties (with < 1%)	409	1.70%	3,203	1.33%	249,460	3.83%
JVP	379	1.58%	7,713	3.21%	273,428	4.19%
Valid Votes	24,018	98.38%	240,440	98.77%	6,520,156	98.78%
Rejected Votes	395	1.62%	2,982	1.23%	80,470	1.22%
Total Polled	24,413	86.95%	243,422	85.47%	6,600,626	80.15%
Registered Electors	28,077		284,801		8,235,358	

== Parliamentary Election Results ==
=== Summary ===
The winner of Passara has matched the final country result 4 out of 7 times. Hence, Passara is a Weak Bellwether for Parliamentary Elections.

Year	Passara	Badulla Electoral District	MAE %	Sri Lanka	MAE %
2015	UNP	UNP	5.00%	UNP	10.83%
2010	UPFA	UPFA	2.82%	UPFA	4.92%
2004	UNP	UNP	9.57%	UPFA	11.57%
2001	UNP	UNP	3.08%	UNP	6.83%
2000	UNP	UNP	2.80%	PA	4.57%
1994	UNP	UNP	6.39%	PA	13.10%
1989	UNP	UNP	0.44%	UNP	5.37%
Matches/Mean MAE	4/7	4/7	4.30%	7/7	8.17%

=== 2015 Sri Lankan Parliamentary Election ===
Party	Passara		Badulla Electoral District		Sri Lanka	
Party	Votes	%	Votes	%	Votes	%
UNP	25,691	59.59%	258,844	54.82%	5,098,916	45.77%
UPFA	13,885	32.21%	179,459	38.01%	4,732,664	42.48%
CWC	2,346	5.44%	10,259	2.17%	17,107	0.15%
JVP	947	2.20%	21,445	4.54%	544,154	4.88%
Other Parties (with < 1%)	243	0.56%	2,159	0.46%	76,945	0.69%
Valid Votes	43,112	93.32%	472,166	95.03%	11,140,333	95.35%
Rejected Votes	3,015	6.53%	24,167	4.86%	516,926	4.42%
Total Polled	46,197	73.44%	496,849	80.07%	11,684,111	77.66%
Registered Electors	62,901		620,486		15,044,490	

=== 2010 Sri Lankan Parliamentary Election ===
Party	Passara		Badulla Electoral District		Sri Lanka	
Party	Votes	%	Votes	%	Votes	%
UPFA	18,320	55.64%	203,689	58.25%	4,846,388	60.38%
UNP	11,744	35.67%	112,886	32.28%	2,357,057	29.37%
UPF	1,955	5.94%	11,481	3.28%	24,670	0.31%
DNA	695	2.11%	15,768	4.51%	441,251	5.50%
Other Parties (with < 1%)	211	0.64%	5,854	1.67%	28,670	0.36%
Valid Votes	32,925	90.93%	349,678	93.54%	8,026,322	96.03%
Rejected Votes	3,284	9.07%	24,169	6.46%	581,465	6.96%
Total Polled	36,209	60.35%	373,847	62.46%	8,358,246	59.29%
Registered Electors	60,002		598,521		14,097,690	

=== 2004 Sri Lankan Parliamentary Election ===
Party	Passara		Badulla Electoral District		Sri Lanka	
Party	Votes	%	Votes	%	Votes	%
UNP	21,016	59.37%	181,705	49.09%	3,486,792	37.73%
UPFA	13,779	38.93%	178,634	48.26%	4,223,126	45.70%
Other Parties (with < 1%)	602	1.70%	9,839	2.66%	610,312	6.60%
Valid Votes	35,397	90.70%	370,178	92.47%	9,241,931	94.52%
Rejected Votes	3,628	9.30%	30,159	7.53%	534,452	5.47%
Total Polled	39,025	74.02%	400,337	78.33%	9,777,821	75.74%
Registered Electors	52,719		511,115		12,909,631	

=== 2001 Sri Lankan Parliamentary Election ===
Party	Passara		Badulla Electoral District		Sri Lanka	
Party	Votes	%	Votes	%	Votes	%
UNP	20,490	56.77%	201,173	53.81%	4,086,026	45.62%
PA	12,174	33.73%	138,443	37.03%	3,330,815	37.19%
IND3	1,743	4.83%	5,065	1.35%	6,161	0.07%
JVP	1,485	4.11%	26,820	7.17%	815,353	9.10%
Other Parties (with < 1%)	198	0.55%	2,336	0.62%	73,230	0.82%
Valid Votes	36,090	90.99%	373,837	93.35%	8,955,844	94.77%
Rejected Votes	3,575	9.01%	26,626	6.65%	494,009	5.23%
Total Polled	39,665	78.28%	400,463	81.51%	9,449,878	76.03%
Registered Electors	50,668		491,288		12,428,762	

=== 2000 Sri Lankan Parliamentary Election ===
Party	Passara		Badulla Electoral District		Sri Lanka	
Party	Votes	%	Votes	%	Votes	%
UNP	15,491	44.14%	167,351	46.36%	3,451,765	40.12%
PA	13,848	39.45%	154,172	42.71%	3,899,329	45.33%
CWC	4,135	11.78%	12,092	3.35%	22,985	0.27%
JVP	912	2.60%	16,414	4.55%	518,725	6.03%
Other Parties (with < 1%)	713	2.03%	10,987	3.04%	431,432	5.02%
Valid Votes	35,099	N/A	361,016	N/A	8,602,617	N/A

=== 1994 Sri Lankan Parliamentary Election ===
Party	Passara		Badulla Electoral District		Sri Lanka	
Party	Votes	%	Votes	%	Votes	%
UNP	21,180	61.02%	182,131	54.04%	3,498,370	44.04%
PA	13,012	37.49%	146,546	43.48%	3,887,805	48.94%
Other Parties (with < 1%)	520	1.50%	8,382	2.49%	223,505	2.81%
Valid Votes	34,712	90.29%	337,059	92.19%	7,943,688	95.20%
Rejected Votes	3,731	9.71%	28,540	7.81%	400,395	4.80%
Total Polled	38,443	83.96%	365,599	82.23%	8,344,095	74.75%
Registered Electors	45,788		444,632		11,163,064	

=== 1989 Sri Lankan Parliamentary Election ===
Party	Passara		Badulla Electoral District		Sri Lanka	
Party	Votes	%	Votes	%	Votes	%
UNP	13,791	58.64%	135,089	58.97%	2,838,005	50.71%
SLFP	8,475	36.03%	81,011	35.36%	1,785,369	31.90%
USA	583	2.48%	5,712	2.49%	141,983	2.54%
ELJP	559	2.38%	5,589	2.44%	67,723	1.21%
Other Parties (with < 1%)	112	0.48%	1,693	0.74%	90,480	1.62%
Valid Votes	23,520	91.88%	229,094	92.08%	5,596,468	93.87%
Rejected Votes	2,079	8.12%	19,704	7.92%	365,563	6.13%
Total Polled	25,599	82.16%	248,798	75.55%	5,962,031	63.60%
Registered Electors	31,156		329,321		9,374,164	

== Demographics ==
=== Ethnicity ===
The Passara Polling Division has a Sinhalese majority (50.3%) and a significant Indian Tamil population (43.0%) . In comparison, the Badulla Electoral District (which contains the Passara Polling Division) has a Sinhalese majority (73.0%) and a significant Indian Tamil population (18.5%)

Ethnicity in Passara
1. Sinhalese (50.3%)
2. Indian Tamil (43.0%)
3. Moor (4.30%)
4. Sri Lankan Tamil (2.20%)
5. Other (0.20%)

=== Religion ===
The Passara Polling Division has a Buddhist majority (50.1%) and a significant Hindu population (40.5%) . In comparison, the Badulla Electoral District (which contains the Passara Polling Division) has a Buddhist majority (72.6%) and a significant Hindu population (19.3%)

Religion in Passara
1. Buddhist (50.1%)
2. Hindu (40.5%)
3. Muslim (4.60%)
4. Roman Catholic (3.20%)
5. Other Christian (1.60%)
6. Other (0.00%)
