= Badulla Electoral District =

Electoral district of Sri Lanka

Badulla
- Electoral District for the Parliament of Sri Lanka
- Administrative District: Badulla
- Province: Uva
- Polling divisions: 9
- Population: 861,000 (2008)
- Electorate: 574,814 (2010)
- Area: 2,861 km^{2} (1,105 sq mi)

Current Electoral District
- Number of members: 8
- MPs: NPP (6) Samantha Vidyaratna; Kitnan Selvaraj; Ambika Samuel; Raveendra Bandara; Sudath Balagalla; Dinindu Hennayake SJB (2) Chaminda Wijesiri; Nayana Wasalathilake NDF (1) Chamara Sampath Dassanayake

Badulla electoral district is one of the 22 multi-member electoral districts of Sri Lanka created by the 1978 Constitution of Sri Lanka. The district is conterminous with the administrative district of Badulla in the Uva province. The district currently elects 8 of the 225 members of the Sri Lankan Parliament and had 574,814 registered electors in 2010. The district is Sri Lanka's Electorate Number 19.

== Polling Divisions ==
The Badulla Electoral District consists of the following polling divisions:

A: Mahiyanganaya

B: Viyaluwa

C: Passara

D: Badulla

E: Hali-Ela

F: Uva-Paranagama

G: Welimada

H: Bandarawela

I. Haputale

== 1982 Presidential Election ==
Results of the 1st presidential election held on 20 October 1982 for the district:

Candidate	Party	Votes per Polling Division									Postal Votes	Total Votes	%
Candidate	Party	Badulla	Bandara -wela	Hali Ela	Hapu- tale	Mahi- yanga -naya	Passara	Uva Parana -gama	Weli- mada	Wiya- luwa	Postal Votes	Total Votes	%
Junius Jayewardene	UNP	12,435	15,718	14,196	11,822	21,340	14,400	17,564	18,673	12,251	2,663	141,062	58.67%
Hector Kobbekaduwa	SLFP	8,485	12,755	10,249	9,257	7,076	8,830	9,251	10,078	10,836	1,645	88,462	36.79%
Rohana Wijeweera	JVP	717	652	1,011	482	443	379	1,851	1,745	242	191	7,713	3.21%
Colvin R. de Silva	LSSP	253	245	212	242	229	230	206	199	237	62	2,115	0.88%
Kumar Ponnambalam	ACTC	76	97	69	55	27	118	54	61	62	6	625	0.26%
Vasudeva Nanayakkara	NSSP	37	55	41	55	33	61	67	35	75	4	463	0.19%
Valid Votes		22,003	29,522	25,778	21,913	29,148	24,018	28,993	30,791	23,703	4,571	240,440	100.00%
Rejected Votes		228	375	351	242	287	395	335	437	289	43	2,982	
Total Polled		22,231	29,897	26,129	22,155	29,435	24,413	29,328	31,228	23,992	4,614	243,422	
Registered Electors		27,419	35,570	30,598	27,756	33,514	28,077	33,670	36,128	27,455		280,187	
Turnout		81.08%	84.05%	85.39%	79.82%	87.83%	86.95%	87.10%	86.44%	87.39%		86.88%	

== 1988 Presidential Election ==
Results of the 2nd presidential election held on 19 December 1988 for the district:

Candidate	Party	Votes per Polling Division									Postal Votes	Total Votes	%
Candidate	Party	Badulla	Bandara -wela	Hali Ela	Hapu- tale	Mahi- yanga -naya	Passara	Uva Parana -gama	Weli- mada	Wiya- luwa	Postal Votes	Total Votes	%
Ranasinghe Premadasa	UNP	4,968	14,191	10,005	10,426	16,990	7,056	3,255	7,491	6,397		80,779	60.09%
Sirimavo Bandaranaike	SLFP	3,160	11,182	6,585	8,003	7,682	3,500	956	3,580	5,575		50,223	37.36%
Oswin Abeygunasekara	SLMP	464	776	543	412	499	230	52	232	214		3,422	2.55%
Valid Votes		8,592	26,149	17,133	18,841	25,171	10,786	4,263	11,303	12,186		134,424	100.00%
Rejected Votes		185	717	466	401	435	425	130	232	285		3,276	
Total Polled		8,777	26,866	17,599	19,242	25,606	11,211	4,393	11,535	12,471		137,700	
Registered Electors		31,924	42,467	35,367	30,645	46,724	31,509	38,520	41,846	30,460		329,462	
Turnout		27.49%	63.26%	49.76%	62.79%	54.80%	35.58%	11.40%	27.57%	40.94%		41.80%	

== 1989 Parliamentary General Election ==
Results of the 9th parliamentary election held on 15 February 1989 for the district:

Party	Votes per Polling Division									Postal Votes	Total Votes	%	Seats
Party	Badulla	Bandara -wela	Hali Ela	Hapu- tale	Mahi- yanga -naya	Passara	Uva Parana -gama	Weli- mada	Wiya- luwa	Postal Votes	Total Votes	%	Seats
United National Party / Ceylon Workers' Congress	10,874	14,078	14,240	11,495	25,158	13,791	15,835	14,743	12,581	2,294	135,089	58.97%	5
Sri Lanka Freedom Party	7,154	10,444	8,454	7,444	9,120	8,475	9,739	10,521	8,067	1,593	81,011	35.36%	3
United Socialist Alliance (CPSL, LSSP, NSSP, SLMP)	1,704	493	1,122	333	124	583	171	380	673	129	5,712	2.49%	0
United Lanka People's Party	716	432	673	398	360	559	344	1,828	244	35	5,589	2.44%	0
Mahajana Eksath Peramuna	171	363	223	93	75	112	337	135	86	98	1,693	0.74%	0
Valid Votes	20,619	25,810	24,712	19,763	34,837	23,520	26,426	27,607	21,651	4,149	229,094	100.00%	8
Rejected Votes	1,360	1,958	2,228	1,509	2,341	2,079	3,429	2,424	2,248	128	19,704		
Total Polled	21,979	27,768	26,940	21,272	37,178	25,599	29,855	30,031	23,899	4,277	248,798		
Registered Electors	30,982	41,805	34,666	30,052	46,406	31,156	38,268	41,334	30,170	4,482	329,321		
Turnout	70.94%	66.42%	77.71%	70.78%	80.11%	82.16%	78.02%	72.65%	79.21%	95.43%	75.55%		

The following candidates were elected: W. J. M. Lokubandara (UNP), 52,559 preference votes (pv); Samaraweera Weerawanni (UNP), 35,210 pv; Lakshman Senewiratne (UNP), 32,427 pv; Hema Ratnayake (SLFP), 28,635 pv; Edwin Wickremarathne Dodangodage Don (SLFP), 28,385 pv; Ravindra Samaraweera (UNP), 26,348 pv; Madduma Bandara Sethapenage Appuhamy Ralalage (SLFP), 23,066 pv; and Amarakone Chandra Karunaratne (UNP), 20,026 pv.

== 1994 Parliamentary General Election ==
Results of the 10th parliamentary election held on 16 August 1994 for the district:

Party	Votes per Polling Division									Postal Votes	Total Votes	%	Seats
Party	Badulla	Bandara -wela	Hali Ela	Hapu- tale	Mahi- yanga -naya	Passara	Uva Parana -gama	Weli- mada	Wiya- luwa	Postal Votes	Total Votes	%	Seats
United National Party / Ceylon Workers' Congress	14,147	21,713	20,677	19,574	27,956	21,180	19,310	19,935	14,340	3,299	182,131	54.04%	5
People's Alliance (SLFP et al.)	14,070	19,545	15,341	14,491	16,702	13,012	16,792	18,811	12,646	5,136	146,546	43.48%	3
Sri Lanka Progressive Front (JVP)	340	396	465	311	319	243	520	612	195	154	3,555	1.05%	0
Independent 2	116	466	167	349	75	151	192	992	80	13	2,601	0.77%	0
Mahajana Eksath Peramuna	258	172	168	92	242	62	211	154	93	89	1,541	0.46%	0
Independent 1	30	112	76	75	86	64	77	65	87	13	685	0.20%	0
Valid Votes	28,961	42,404	36,894	34,892	45,380	34,712	37,102	40,569	27,441	8,704	337,059	100.00%	8
Rejected Votes	1,937	3,255	3,419	3,780	3,083	3,731	3,095	3,300	2,744	196	28,540		
Total Polled	30,898	45,659	40,313	38,672	48,463	38,443	40,197	43,869	30,185	8,900	365,599		
Registered Electors	40,039	56,426	48,807	48,853	58,235	45,788	47,127	53,643	36,342		435,260		
Turnout	77.17%	80.92%	82.60%	79.16%	83.22%	83.96%	85.30%	81.78%	83.06%		84.00%		

The following candidates were elected: W. J. M. Lokubandara (UNP), 78,845 preference votes (pv); Dilan Perera (PA), 54,150 pv; Samaraweera Weerawanni (PA), 44,595 pv; Ravindra Samaraweera (UNP), 42,309 pv; Sennan Veera (UNP), 41,683 pv; Lakshman Senewiratne (UNP), 41,320 pv; Hema Ratnayake (PA), 40,873 pv; and R.M. Ratnayake (UNP), 40,293 pv.

== 1994 Presidential Election ==
Results of the 3rd presidential election held on 9 November 1994 for the district:

Candidate	Party	Votes per Polling Division									Postal Votes	Total Votes	%
Candidate	Party	Badulla	Bandara -wela	Hali Ela	Hapu- tale	Mahi- yanga -naya	Passara	Uva Parana -gama	Weli- mada	Wiya- luwa	Postal Votes	Total Votes	%
Chandrika Kumaratunga	PA	17,416	23,648	20,090	20,108	18,218	19,303	20,307	22,177	15,304	6,239	182,810	55.27%
Srimathi Dissanayake	UNP	10,210	15,072	14,430	13,371	24,842	13,793	16,031	17,280	11,227	3,355	139,611	42.21%
Hudson Samarasinghe	Ind 2	255	464	491	551	446	556	335	284	456	9	3,847	1.16%
Harischandra Wijayatunga	SMBP	182	236	212	221	213	176	134	164	145	62	1,745	0.53%
A.J. Ranashinge	Ind 1	104	152	153	140	213	167	129	126	183	20	1,387	0.42%
Nihal Galappaththi	SLPF	76	161	146	140	203	174	141	121	172	38	1,372	0.41%
Valid Votes		28,243	39,733	35,522	34,531	44,135	34,169	37,077	40,152	27,487	9,723	330,772	100.00%
Rejected Votes		958	2,003	1,861	2,182	1,302	1,873	1,267	1,482	1,002	163	14,093	
Total Polled		29,201	41,736	37,383	36,713	45,437	36,042	38,344	41,634	28,489	9,886	344,865	
Registered Electors		40,039	56,426	48,807	48,853	58,235	45,788	47,127	53,643	36,342		435,260	
Turnout		72.93%	73.97%	76.59%	75.15%	78.02%	78.71%	81.36%	77.61%	78.39%		79.23%	

== 1999 Provincial Council Election ==
Results of the 3rd Uva provincial council election held on 6 April 1999 for the district:

Party	Votes	%	Seats
People's Alliance (SLFP, SLMC et al.)	140,293	44.69%	
United National Party	137,437	43.78%	
National Union of Workers (CWC, DWC)	19,224	6.12%	
Janatha Vimukthi Peramuna	12,106	3.86%	
Up-Country People's Front	2,473	0.79%	
Mahajana Eksath Peramuna	1,980	0.63%	
Independent	407	0.13%	
Valid Votes	313,920	100.00%	
Rejected Votes	29,396		
Total Polled	343,316		
Registered Electors	454,913		
Turnout	75.47%		

== 1999 Presidential Election ==
Results of the 4th presidential election held on 21 December 1999 for the district:

Candidate	Party	Votes per Polling Division									Postal Votes	Total Votes	%
Candidate	Party	Badulla	Bandara -wela	Hali Ela	Hapu- tale	Mahi- yanga -naya	Passara	Uva Parana -gama	Weli- mada	Wiya- luwa	Postal Votes	Total Votes	%
Ranil Wickremasinghe	UNP	13,310	20,768	18,382	18,053	27,638	18,124	18,969	20,447	13,003	4,190	172,884	47.97%
Chandrika Kumaratunga	PA	16,039	23,002	18,253	16,622	19,750	16,558	18,433	20,063	13,336	4,944	167,000	46.33%
Nandana Gunathilake	JVP	1,125	1,339	1,384	826	1,757	748	1,401	1,665	957	823	12,025	3.34%
Rajiva Wijesinha	Liberal	88	150	154	180	400	205	117	126	230	2	1,652	0.46%
W.V.M. Ranjith	Ind 2	71	164	142	164	260	189	134	156	218	1	1,499	0.42%
T. Edirisuriya	Ind 1	92	151	131	121	199	155	88	99	193	5	1,234	0.34%
Harischandra Wijayatunga	SMBP	115	178	163	103	133	95	72	128	116	74	1,177	0.33%
Abdul Rasool	SLMP	105	98	85	92	54	61	54	291	68	7	915	0.25%
Vasudeva Nanayakkara	LDA	72	87	39	86	46	64	61	33	49	52	589	0.16%
Kamal Karunadasa	PLSF	37	74	77	52	62	67	55	69	56	5	554	0.15%
Hudson Samarasinghe	Ind 3	20	74	57	57	69	54	35	47	82	0	495	0.14%
A. Dissanayaka	DUNF	15	26	21	23	24	28	15	15	32	4	203	0.06%
A.W. Premawardhana	PFF	9	29	25	17	26	23	16	17	29	3	194	0.05%
Valid Votes		31,098	46,140	38,913	36,396	50,418	36,371	39,450	43,156	28,369	10,110	360,421	100.00%
Rejected Votes		882	1,526	1,433	1,210	1,308	1,222	960	1,203	958	277	10,979	
Total Polled		31,980	47,666	40,346	37,606	51,726	37,593	40,410	44,359	29,327	10,387	371,400	
Registered Electors		42,591	62,074	51,998	48,861	65,925	48,066	49,560	56,170	38,978		464,223	
Turnout		75.09%	76.79%	77.59%	76.97%	78.46%	78.21%	81.54%	78.97%	75.24%		80.00%	

== 2000 Parliamentary General Election ==
Results of the 11th parliamentary election held on 10 October 2000 for the district:

Party	Votes per Polling Division									Postal Votes	Total Votes	%	Seats
Party	Badulla	Bandara -wela	Hali Ela	Hapu- tale	Mahi- yanga -naya	Passara	Uva Parana -gama	Weli- mada	Wiya- luwa	Postal Votes	Total Votes	%	Seats
United National Party	13,312	20,912	17,338	16,430	28,850	15,491	17,582	19,377	12,880	5,179	167,351	46.36%	5
People's Alliance (SLFP et al.)	14,638	19,836	17,588	13,699	17,792	13,848	18,162	18,661	13,082	6,866	154,172	42.71%	3
Janatha Vimukthi Peramuna	1,778	1,928	1,802	1,046	2,990	912	1,815	1,835	1,131	1,177	16,414	4.55%	0
Ceylon Workers' Congress	631	1,927	944	2,975	6	4,135	394	617	342	121	12,092	3.35%	0
National Unity Alliance (SLMC)	430	564	293	473	153	173	215	2,577	113	61	5,052	1.40%	0
New Left Front (NSSP et al.)	135	253	233	231	343	216	210	161	227	13	2,022	0.56%	0
Sinhala Heritage	297	447	184	174	105	70	119	152	65	164	1,777	0.49%	0
Citizen's Front	96	76	99	28	58	34	50	42	101	13	597	0.17%	0
Liberal Party	16	34	31	36	54	47	27	30	49	1	325	0.09%	0
Democratic United National Front	20	51	26	23	39	38	27	31	23	1	279	0.08%	0
Independent 1	16	31	24	14	31	17	19	18	36	1	207	0.06%	0
People's Freedom Front	11	20	25	29	9	55	12	7	11	0	179	0.05%	0
Independent 4	14	24	24	12	32	21	21	13	16	1	178	0.05%	0
Independent 3	10	17	16	34	16	20	7	9	17	2	148	0.04%	0
National Development Front	4	10	8	9	11	15	6	8	9	0	80	0.02%	0
Sri Lanka Progressive Front	8	11	10	13	9	1	3	10	11	1	77	0.02%	0
Independent 2	10	14	7	10	3	6	4	5	6	1	66	0.02%	0
Valid Votes	31,426	46,155	38,652	35,236	50,501	35,099	38,673	43,553	28,119	13,602	361,016	100.00%	8
Rejected Votes	1,869	3,650	3,380	3,683	2,908		2,921	2,999	2,658		28,187		
Total Polled	33,295	49,805	42,032	38,919	53,409		41,594	46,552	30,777		389,203		
Registered Electors	43,882	63,837	52,866	50,052	68,260	49,102	50,535	57,245	39,779		475,558		
Turnout	75.87%	78.02%	79.51%	77.76%	78.24%		82.30%	81.32%	77.37%		81.84%		

The following candidates were elected: Nimal Siripala De Silva (PA), 98,917 preference votes (pv); W. J. M. Lokubandara (UNP), 75,417 pv; Lakshman Senewiratne (UNP), 51,382 pv; Sethapenage Appuhamy Ralalage Madduma Bandara (PA), 47,152 pv; Upali Delton Samaraweera (UNP), 45,839 pv; Ravindra Samaraweera (UNP), 44,257 pv; Rathnayake Mudiyanselage Ratnayake (UNP), 38,997 pv; and Dilan Perera (PA), 38,415 pv.

== 2001 Parliamentary General Election ==
Results of the 12th parliamentary election held on 5 December 2001 for the district:

Party	Votes per Polling Division									Postal Votes	Total Votes	%	Seats
Party	Badulla	Bandara -wela	Hali Ela	Hapu- tale	Mahi- yanga -naya	Passara	Uva Parana -gama	Weli- mada	Wiya- luwa	Postal Votes	Total Votes	%	Seats
United National Front (UNP, SLMC, CWC, DPF)	16,240	25,750	20,754	22,114	30,316	20,490	20,496	24,295	14,792		201,173	53.81%	5
People's Alliance (SLFP et al.)	12,518	17,710	15,137	12,340	17,224	12,174	16,287	17,253	11,949		138,443	37.03%	3
Janatha Vimukthi Peramuna	2,851	3,319	2,775	1,729	4,655	1,485	2,772	3,413	1,962		26,820	7.17%	0
Independent 3	817	592	872	575	4	1,743	70	267	99		5,065	1.35%	0
Sinhala Heritage	137	302	127	70	64	42	63	114	66		1,044	0.28%	0
National Democratic Party	40	30	85	12	56	41	23	32	33		352	0.09%	0
Ruhuna People's Party	21	28	39	22	64	24	20	18	40		276	0.07%	0
Independent 5	13	21	23	16	26	28	19	25	29		203	0.05%	0
Independent 4	8	12	19	14	19	14	9	8	11		114	0.03%	0
Independent 1	6	9	14	4	20	9	10	10	23		105	0.03%	0
Independent 2	12	11	13	4	10	16	4	8	13		91	0.02%	0
Sri Lanka National Front	7	9	10	3	15	14	6	8	11		83	0.02%	0
Sri Lanka Progressive Front	7	4	9	7	9	10	2	8	11		68	0.02%	0
Valid Votes	32,677	47,797	39,877	36,910	52,482	36,090	39,781	45,459	29,039		373,837	100.00%	8
Rejected Votes	1,884	3,543	3,047	3,325	2,793	3,575	2,681	2,908	2,579		26,626		
Total Polled	34,561	51,340	42,924	40,235	55,275	39,665	42,462	48,367	31,618		400,463		
Registered Electors	45,540	65,674	54,349	51,762	70,678	50,668	51,763	59,666	41,188		491,288		
Turnout	75.89%	78.17%	78.98%	77.73%	78.21%	78.28%	82.03%	81.06%	76.77%		81.51%		

The following candidates were elected: Nimal Siripala De Silva (PA), 85,273 preference votes (pv); W. J. M. Lokubandara (UNF), 80,593 pv; Lakshman Senewiratne (UNF), 46,792 pv; Ravindra Samaraweera (UNF), 44,742 pv; Upali Delton Samaraweera (UNF), 43,228 pv; K. Velayudam (UNF), 40,753 pv; Sethapenage Appuhamy Ralalage Madduma Bandara (PA), 36,708 pv; and D.D.W. Wickremaratne (PA), 33,513 pv.

== 2004 Parliamentary General Election ==
Results of the 13th parliamentary election held on 2 April 2004 for the district:

Party	Votes per Polling Division									Postal Votes	Total Votes	%	Seats
Party	Badulla	Bandara -wela	Hali Ela	Hapu- tale	Mahi- yanga -naya	Passara	Uva Parana -gama	Weli- mada	Wiya- luwa	Postal Votes	Total Votes	%	Seats
United National Front (UNP, SLMC, CWC, DPF)	15,825	23,791	19,125	21,258	23,822	21,016	18,030	20,441	12,874	5,523	181,705	49.09%	5
United People's Freedom Alliance (SLFP, JVP et al.)	15,103	21,784	17,926	15,499	27,727	13,779	19,946	23,040	14,805	9,025	178,634	48.26%	3
Jathika Hela Urumaya	1,586	1,343	725	639	363	279	357	775	211	654	6,932	1.87%	0
United Lalith Front	45	73	81	73	89	94	67	67	55	3	647	0.17%	0
National Development Front	45	158	64	45	47	79	62	67	33	10	610	0.16%	0
United Socialist Party	43	79	66	92	76	77	52	53	50	0	588	0.16%	0
Independent 7	21	44	36	34	58	23	30	32	51	0	329	0.09%	0
New Left Front (NSSP et al.)	18	19	13	26	27	12	113	8	3	6	245*	0.07%	0
Independent 6	9	24	17	14	18	11	20	12	16	0	141	0.04%	0
Sinhalaye Mahasammatha Bhoomiputra Pakshaya	2	6	6	1	16	4	2	6	9	4	56	0.02%	0
Independent 1	7	4	8	3	4	5	3	3	7	1	45	0.01%	0
Independent 4	4	2	11	2	9	4	1	5	4	1	43	0.01%	0
Independent 5	3	5	5	4	9	4	1	2	7	0	40	0.01%	0
Swarajya	4	3	1	4	8	2	3	3	8	0	36	0.01%	0
Independent 2	9	2	2	6	6	3	3	0	5	0	36	0.01%	0
Ruhuna People's Party	0	5	3	1	3	3	6	3	5	6	35*	0.01%	0
Sri Lanka Progressive Front	3	5	5	4	3	1	2	3	2	0	28	0.01%	0
Independent 3	4	1	6	3	6	1	1	2	3	1	28	0.01%	0
Valid Votes	32,731	47,348	38,100	37,708	52,291	35,397	38,699	44,522	28,148	15,234	370,178	100.00%	8
Rejected Votes	1,980	3,780	3,886	3,475	3,442	3,628	3,275	3,851	2,556	286	30,159		
Total Polled	34,711	51,128	41,986	41,183	55,733	39,025	41,974	48,373	30,704	15,520	400,337		
Registered Electors	46,872	67,710	55,733	54,797	74,365	52,719	53,690	62,308	42,921		511,115		
Turnout	74.05%	75.51%	75.33%	75.16%	74.95%	74.02%	78.18%	77.64%	71.54%		78.33%		

The following candidates were elected: K. V. Samantha Vidyaratna (UPFA-JVP), 98,848 preference votes (pv); Nimal Siripala De Silva (UPFA-SLFP), 96,799 pv; Dilan Perera (UPFA-SLFP), 64,655 pv; W. J. M. Lokubandara (UNF-UNP), 56,954 pv; Ravindra Samaraweera (UNF-UNP), 49,387 pv; M. Satchithanandan (UNF-CWC), 44,934 pv; Lakshman Senewiratne (UNF-UNP), 40,820 pv; and Vadivel Suresh (UNF-CWC), 37,520 pv.

== 2004 Provincial Council Election ==
Results of the 4th Uva provincial council election held on 10 July 2004 for the district:

Party	Votes per Polling Division									Postal Votes	Total Votes	%	Seats
Party	Badulla	Bandara -wela	Hali Ela	Hapu- tale	Mahi- yanga -naya	Passara	Uva Parana -gama	Weli- mada	Wiya- luwa	Postal Votes	Total Votes	%	Seats
United People's Freedom Alliance (SLFP, JVP et al.)	14,755	20,409	17,863	14,998	24,838	15,345	19,032	21,218	14,879	5,860	169,197	55.48%	12
United National Party	9,753	14,620	11,346	12,303	15,707	13,712	14,751	15,286	8,965	2,728	119,171	39.08%	8
Up-Country People's Front	1,301	2,335	1,686	3,306	43	1,948	688	843	515	94	12,759	4.18%	1
United Socialist Party	154	315	247	313	279	367	268	228	178	15	2,364	0.78%	0
National Development Front	29	86	63	49	80	63	48	51	47	7	523	0.17%	0
Sri Lanka Muslim Party	260	27	64	42	16	22	10	14	12	1	468	0.15%	0
Sinhalaye Mahasammatha Bhoomiputra Pakshaya	43	22	21	27	50	11	15	22	13	22	246	0.08%	0
Independent	18	22	23	19	39	26	21	19	41	3	231	0.08%	0
Valid Votes	26,313	37,836	31,313	31,057	41,052	31,494	34,833	37,681	24,650	8,730	304,959	100.00%	21
Rejected Votes	1,969	2,961	2,876	3,286	3,220	3,018	2,601	2,890	2,316	491	25,628		
Total Polled	28,282	40,797	34,189	34,343	44,272	34,512	37,434	40,571	26,966	9,221	330,587		
Registered Electors	46,872	67,710	55,733	54,797	74,365	52,719	53,690	62,308	42,921		511,115		
Turnout	60.34%	60.25%	61.34%	62.67%	59.53%	65.46%	69.72%	65.11%	62.83%		64.68%		

The following candidates were elected: Anthinna Markkalage Buddhadasa (UPFA), 42,679 preference votes (pv); R. M. Udeni Nandana Kumara Ramanayaka (UPFA), 40,838 pv; Upali Delton Samaraweera (UNP), 40,297 pv; Rohana Pushpakumara (UPFA), 31,666 pv; D. D. W. Wickramarathna (UPFA), 25,732 pv; R. M. Dinadasa Rathnayaka (UPFA), 24,211 pv; R. M. Sudath Balagalla (UPFA), 21,681 pv; A. J. M. Gunathilaka (UPFA), 20,199 pv; R. M. Rathnayake (UNP), 19,411 pv; D. M. Hema Rathnayaka (UPFA), 18,170 pv; Madar Saibu Sehu Mohamed (UPFA), 17,345 pv; Manel Rathnayaka (UPFA), 16,215 pv; Ponnusamy Bhoominathan (UPFA), 16,074 pv; K. Velayudam (UNP), 15,423 pv; Sethapena Appuhami Ralalage Bandusena (UPFA), 13,446 pv; Vincent Dias Dren (UNP), 15,076 pv; Muththu Kandasamy Wiji Visvanathan (UNP), 13,189 pv; A. C. Ameer Mohamed (UNP), 12,356 pv; Murugan Periyasamy Loganathan (UNP), 11,759 pv; W. J. M. Samarasekara Bandara (UNP), 11,650 pv; and Arunachalem Aravindh Kumar (UCPF), 5,059 pv.

== 2005 Presidential Election ==
Results of the 5th presidential election held on 17 November 2005 for the district:

Candidate	Party	Votes per Polling Division									Postal Votes	Total Votes	%
Candidate	Party	Badulla	Bandara -wela	Hali Ela	Hapu- tale	Mahi- yanga -naya	Passara	Uva Parana -gama	Weli- mada	Wiya- luwa	Postal Votes	Total Votes	%
Ranil Wickremasinghe	UNP	18,624	29,137	23,638	25,935	32,592	25,176	22,127	26,108	16,423	6,822	226,582	53.11%
Mahinda Rajapaksa	UPFA	17,494	24,294	19,946	15,856	26,877	15,717	21,387	23,736	16,803	10,624	192,734	45.18%
Siritunga Jayasuriya	USP	155	315	310	354	286	135	227	281	258	6	2,327	0.55%
A.A. Suraweera	NDF	129	285	249	174	307	207	165	200	268	6	1,990	0.47%
Victor Hettigoda	ULPP	58	65	73	51	79	53	78	76	45	36	614	0.14%
Chamil Jayaneththi	NLF	29	61	50	29	100	30	46	47	67	9	468	0.11%
Aruna de Soyza	RPP	30	41	27	45	67	39	53	49	48	2	401	0.09%
Anura De Silva	ULF	29	46	46	35	51	38	26	41	48	3	363	0.09%
Wimal Geeganage	SLNF	15	32	53	17	62	18	33	41	45	6	322	0.08%
A.K.J. Arachchige	DUA	22	26	36	24	38	20	21	23	29	0	239	0.06%
Wije Dias	SEP	16	36	35	24	28	29	20	8	25	3	224	0.05%
P. Nelson Perera	SLPF	14	37	29	25	24	19	23	18	27	1	217	0.05%
H.S. Dharmadwaja	UNAF	8	18	19	13	12	10	12	17	8	1	118	0.03%
Valid Votes		36,623	54,393	44,511	42,582	60,523	41,491	44,218	50,645	34,094	17,519	426,599	100.00%
Rejected Votes		512	888	785	736	947	874	588	640	611	244	6,825	
Total Polled		37,135	55,281	45,296	43,318	61,470	42,365	44,806	51,285	34,705	17,763	433,424	
Registered Electors		48,670	71,292	57,900	56,220	78,986	54,910	55,655	64,481	45,049		533,163	
Turnout		76.30%	77.54%	78.23%	77.05%	77.82%	77.15%	80.51%	79.54%	77.04%		81.29%	

== 2009 Provincial Council Election ==
Results of the 5th Uva provincial council election held on 8 August 2009 for the district:

Party	Votes per Polling Division									Postal Votes	Total Votes	%	Seats
Party	Badulla	Bandara -wela	Hali Ela	Hapu- tale	Mahi- yanga -naya	Passara	Uva Parana -gama	Weli- mada	Wiya- luwa	Postal Votes	Total Votes	%	Seats
United People's Freedom Alliance (SLFP et al.)	21,386	33,702	27,088	26,471	39,909	23,959	24,569	29,431	20,433	12,121	259,069	67.79%	14
United National Party	12,084	12,821	10,653	7,765	12,013	9,736	12,036	11,862	7,437	2,228	98,635	25.81%	5
Up-Country People's Front	570	1,759	1,206	2,760	22	1,855	346	204	398	107	9,227	2.41%	1
Janatha Vimukthi Peramuna	628	819	728	603	1,943	540	1,525	1,114	564	543	9,007	2.36%	1
Sri Lanka Muslim Congress	279	766	178	351	86	458	121	1,840	42	29	4,150	1.09%	0
United National Alliance	62	57	54	46	59	68	66	41	44	6	503	0.13%	0
Democratic Unity Alliance	39	48	204	29	8	70	21	39	21	2	481	0.13%	0
United Socialist Party	22	39	43	31	26	37	25	21	28	4	276	0.07%	0
National Development Front	18	41	21	25	40	44	17	17	22	2	247	0.06%	0
Independent 4	9	29	16	12	17	21	15	16	21	2	158	0.04%	0
Independent 3	6	15	11	12	9	10	5	15	5	1	89	0.02%	0
Jansetha Peramuna	4	17	6	2	9	4	3	15	7	0	67	0.02%	0
United Lanka Great Council	3	9	6	5	6	3	11	2	11	0	56	0.01%	0
Independent 2	3	4	5	4	4	7	3	5	15	1	51	0.01%	0
Patriotic National Front	1	9	8	5	7	5	0	3	6	0	44	0.01%	0
Independent 1	5	5	6	6	3	6	1	3	4	0	39	0.01%	0
Sri Lanka Progressive Front	2	4	4	2	4	1	2	7	4	1	31	0.01%	0
Sinhalaye Mahasammatha Bhoomiputra Pakshaya	4	3	3	1	3	1	2	8	3	2	30	0.01%	0
Valid Votes	35,125	50,147	40,240	38,130	54,168	36,825	38,768	44,643	29,065	15,049	382,160	100.00%	21
Rejected Votes	1,508	3,311	3,006	3,268	2,615	3,156	2,337	2,572	2,378	304	24,455		
Total Polled	36,633	53,458	43,246	41,398	56,783	39,981	41,105	47,215	31,443	15,353	406,615		
Registered Electors	51,468	77,312	63,124	60,706	85,562	60,002	59,472	68,937	48,231		574,814		
Turnout	71.18%	69.15%	68.51%	68.19%	66.36%	66.63%	69.12%	68.49%	65.19%		70.74%		

The following candidates were elected: Anura Ravindra Widanagamage (UPFA), 51,309 preference votes (pv); Anthinna Markkalage Buddhadasa (UPFA), 43,913 pv; Harin Fernando (UNP), 36,996 pv; Rohana Pushpakumara (UPFA), 36,204 pv; D. M. S. W. K. Denipitiya (UPFA), 35,380 pv; Manel Rathnayaka (UPFA), 31,139 pv; M. H. Sumith Samayadasa (UPFA), 30,558 pv; Sethapena Appuhami Ralalage Bandusena (UPFA), 30,080 pv; Mihimal Munasinghe (UPFA), 26,377 pv; Ajith Deshapriya Nilame Wickramarathna Dodangodage Don (UPFA), 24,743 pv; Upali Delton Samaraweera (UNP), 24,739 pv; Author Chamara Sampath Dasanayaka (UPFA), 24,490 pv; D. M. Hema Rathnayaka (UPFA), 20,855 pv; A. Akalan Sendil Thondaman (UPFA), 20,448 pv; Don Sunil Jayantha Kannangara (UNP), 20,328 pv; A. J. M. Gunathilaka (UPFA), 19,457 pv; Rathnayaka Mudiyanselage Nimal Rathnayaka (UPFA), 17,622 p; K. Velayudam (UNP), 14,870 pv; R. Gunawardana (UNP), 11,220 pv; Arunachalem Aravindh Kumar (UCPF), 7,863 pv; and R. M. Sudath Balagalla (JVP), 1,969 pv.

== 2010 Presidential Election ==
Results of the 6th presidential election held on 26 January 2010 for the district:

Candidate	Party	Votes per Polling Division									Postal Votes	Total Votes	%
Candidate	Party	Badulla	Bandara -wela	Hali Ela	Hapu- tale	Mahi- yanga -naya	Passara	Uva Parana -gama	Weli- mada	Wiya- luwa	Postal Votes	Total Votes	%
Mahinda Rajapaksa	UPFA	19,799	29,975	23,758	19,135	38,486	18,529	24,831	27,252	20,816	14,998	237,579	53.23%
Sarath Fonseka	NDF	17,917	26,085	21,946	23,856	24,057	22,601	18,696	23,092	12,529	8,056	198,835	44.55%
M.C.M. Ismail	DUNF	69	182	144	154	175	177	131	110	107	43	1,292	0.29%
A.A. Suraweera	NDF	72	178	161	83	207	130	121	99	152	11	1,214	0.27%
C.J. Sugathsiri Gamage	UDF	75	157	151	218	106	231	88	82	98	6	1,212	0.27%
W.V. Mahiman Ranjith	Ind 1	45	100	85	66	161	75	90	85	76	12	795	0.18%
A.S.P Liyanage	SLLP	60	83	76	82	118	102	68	57	79	8	733	0.16%
Lal Perera	ONF	57	74	71	86	78	109	67	64	61	2	669	0.15%
Sarath Manamendra	NSH	45	71	63	87	81	90	42	42	55	4	580	0.13%
Ukkubanda Wijekoon	Ind 3	47	73	67	35	75	52	61	60	53	2	525	0.12%
Siritunga Jayasuriya	USP	31	60	66	63	53	71	60	53	46	3	506	0.11%
M. K. Shivajilingam	Ind 5	42	61	73	53	35	68	37	36	42	3	450	0.10%
Aithurus M. Illias	Ind 2	19	27	33	32	33	30	22	44	17	8	265	0.06%
Sanath Pinnaduwa	NA	17	23	32	35	41	47	25	22	20	1	263	0.06%
Vikramabahu Karunaratne	LF	14	23	39	34	31	46	16	21	18	6	248	0.06%
Wije Dias	SEP	23	34	39	39	18	25	23	20	21	4	246	0.06%
Aruna de Soyza	RPP	14	20	18	28	20	34	14	16	15	0	179	0.04%
M. Mohamed Musthaffa	Ind 4	13	13	21	19	18	31	18	17	14	1	165	0.04%
Senaratna de Silva	PNF	10	21	17	19	25	29	19	16	8	0	164	0.04%
Battaramulla Seelarathana	JP	11	20	17	12	24	20	13	13	19	4	153	0.03%
M.B. Thaminimulla	ACAKO	7	18	14	11	11	19	13	17	5	2	117	0.03%
Sarath Kongahage	UNAF	5	13	15	12	10	15	4	14	16	0	104	0.02%
Valid Votes		38,392	57,311	46,906	44,159	63,863	42,531	44,459	51,232	34,267	23,174	446,294	100.00%
Rejected Votes		441	735	665	831	491	716	425	509	1,068	202	6,083	
Total Polled		38,833	58,046	47,571	44,990	64,354	43,247	44,884	51,741	35,335	23,376	452,377	
Registered Electors		51,468	77,312	63,124	60,706	85,562	60,002	59,472	68,937	48,231		574,814	
Turnout		75.45%	75.08%	75.36%	74.11%	75.21%	72.08%	75.47%	75.06%	73.26%		78.70%	

== 2010 Parliamentary General Election ==
Results of the 14th parliamentary election held on 8 April 2010 for the district:

Party	Votes per Polling Division									Postal Votes	Total Votes	%	Seats
Party	Badulla	Bandara -wela	Hali Ela	Hapu- tale	Mahi- yanga -naya	Passara	Uva Parana -gama	Weli- mada	Wiya- luwa	Postal Votes	Total Votes	%	Seats
United People's Freedom Alliance (SLFP, CWC et al.)	18,670	24,188	21,341	17,197	29,903	18,320	21,537	19,820	16,967	15,746	203,689	58.25%	6
United National Front (UNP, SLMC, DPF, SLFP(P))	11,314	14,803	11,858	11,575	14,613	11,744	11,253	14,070	7,046	4,610	112,886	32.28%	2
Democratic National Alliance (JVP et al.)	1,655	2,262	1,544	1,346	2,433	695	1,696	1,816	705	1,616	15,768	4.51%	0
Up-Country People's Front	598	2,145	1,173	3,829	7	1,955	625	540	423	186	11,481	3.28%	0
Independent 4	75	130	100	397	66	56	269	3,221	97	235	4,646	1.33%	0
United National Alternative Front	17	26	30	28	33	42	25	26	23	4	254	0.07%	0
Independent 5	11	25	20	41	25	35	13	58	13	3	244	0.07%	0
Sinhalaye Mahasammatha Bhoomiputra Pakshaya	15	3	7	3	5	5	7	6	73	13	137	0.04%	0
United Democratic Front	12	18	13	13	16	17	11	8	8	4	120	0.03%	0
Independent 1	11	9	12	9	9	18	6	6	7	4	91	0.03%	0
Janasetha Peramuna	3	19	7	14	7	7	4	11	4	3	79	0.02%	0
National People's Party	1	8	14	11	10	7	7	6	6	1	71	0.02%	0
United Lanka Great Council	7	3	4	16	12	14	2	7	5	0	70	0.02%	0
Independent 2	2	9	6	4	6	2	8	3	5	3	48	0.01%	0
Independent 3	3	7	4	1	2	5	9	9	3	1	44	0.01%	0
Ruhuna People's Party	3	2	4	1	4	3	2	0	4	3	26	0.01%	0
Sri Lanka Labour Party	1	5	0	5	5	0	0	1	4	3	24	0.01%	0
Valid Votes	32,398	43,662	36,137	34,490	47,156	32,925	35,474	39,608	25,393	22,435	349,678	100.00%	8
Rejected Votes	1,409	2,982	2,893	3,134	2,520	3,284	2,478	2,642	2,135	692	24,169		
Total Polled	33,807	46,644	39,030	37,624	49,676	36,209	37,952	42,250	27,528	23,127	373,847		
Registered Electors	51,468	77,312	63,124	60,706	85,562	60,002	59,472	68,937	48,231		574,814		
Turnout	65.69%	60.33%	61.83%	61.98%	58.06%	60.35%	63.81%	61.29%	57.08%		65.04%		

The following candidates were elected: Nimal Siripala De Silva (UPFA-SLFP), 141,990 preference votes (pv); Dilan Perera (UPFA-SLFP), 69,610 pv; Harin Fernando (UNF), 49,073 pv; Lal Chamika Buddhadasa (UPFA), 42,856 pv; Udith Lokubandara (UPFA), 38,124 pv; Rohana Pushpakumara (UPFA), 36,080 pv; Amith Thenuka Vidanagamage (UPFA), 34,742 pv; and Lakshman Senewiratne (UNF-UNP), 31,560 pv.

Harin Fernando (UNP) resigned to contest the Uva provincial council elections on 5 August 2014. His replacement K. Velayudam (UNP) was sworn in on 8 August 2014.
