= Welimada Polling Division =

Welimada
- Polling Division
- Coordinates: 6.860948°N 80.879512°E
- Country: Sri Lanka
- Province: Uva Province, Sri Lanka
- Electoral District: Badulla Electoral District

Area
  - Total: 189.35 km^{2} (73.11 sq mi)

Population (2012)
  - Total: 100,808
  - Density: 532/km^{2} (1,380/sq mi)
- ISO 3166 code: EC-19G

The Welimada Polling Division is a Polling Division in the Badulla Electoral District, in the Uva Province, Sri Lanka.

== Presidential Election Results ==
=== Summary ===
The winner of Welimada has matched the final country result 6 out of 8 times. Hence, Welimada is a Weak Bellwether for Presidential Elections.

Year	Welimada	Badulla Electoral District	MAE %	Sri Lanka	MAE %
2019	SLPP	SLPP	1.31%	SLPP	4.09%
2015	NDF	NDF	1.29%	NDF	0.51%
2010	UPFA	UPFA	0.25%	UPFA	4.69%
2005	UNP	UNP	1.59%	UPFA	3.23%
1999	UNP	UNP	0.37%	PA	4.37%
1994	PA	PA	0.38%	PA	6.95%
1988	UNP	UNP	5.85%	UNP	14.08%
1982	UNP	UNP	2.73%	UNP	6.69%
Matches/Mean MAE	6/8	6/8	1.72%	8/8	5.58%

=== 2019 Sri Lankan Presidential Election ===
Party	Welimada		Badulla Electoral District		Sri Lanka	
Party	Votes	%	Votes	%	Votes	%
SLPP	30,670	48.15%	276,211	49.29%	6,924,255	52.25%
NDF	29,673	46.58%	251,706	44.92%	5,564,239	41.99%
Other Parties (with < 1%)	1,687	2.65%	17,622	3.14%	345,452	2.61%
NMPP	1,671	2.62%	14,806	2.64%	418,553	3.16%
Valid Votes	63,701	99.02%	560,345	98.77%	13,252,499	98.99%
Rejected Votes	632	0.98%	6,978	1.23%	135,452	1.01%
Total Polled	64,333	86.02%	567,323	86.25%	13,387,951	83.71%
Registered Electors	74,786		657,766		15,992,568	

=== 2015 Sri Lankan Presidential Election ===
Party	Welimada		Badulla Electoral District		Sri Lanka	
Party	Votes	%	Votes	%	Votes	%
NDF	29,431	50.68%	249,524	49.21%	6,217,162	51.28%
UPFA	27,874	48.00%	249,243	49.15%	5,768,090	47.58%
Other Parties (with < 1%)	770	1.33%	8,303	1.64%	138,200	1.14%
Valid Votes	58,075	98.87%	507,070	98.47%	12,123,452	98.85%
Rejected Votes	664	1.13%	7,871	1.53%	140,925	1.15%
Total Polled	58,739	78.91%	514,941	79.51%	12,264,377	78.69%
Registered Electors	74,436		647,628		15,585,942	

=== 2010 Sri Lankan Presidential Election ===
Party	Welimada		Badulla Electoral District		Sri Lanka	
Party	Votes	%	Votes	%	Votes	%
UPFA	27,252	53.19%	237,579	53.23%	6,015,934	57.88%
NDF	23,092	45.07%	198,835	44.55%	4,173,185	40.15%
Other Parties (with < 1%)	888	1.73%	9,880	2.21%	204,494	1.97%
Valid Votes	51,232	99.02%	446,294	98.66%	10,393,613	99.03%
Rejected Votes	509	0.98%	6,083	1.34%	101,838	0.97%
Total Polled	51,741	75.06%	452,377	75.62%	10,495,451	66.70%
Registered Electors	68,937		598,190		15,734,587	

=== 2005 Sri Lankan Presidential Election ===
Party	Welimada		Badulla Electoral District		Sri Lanka	
Party	Votes	%	Votes	%	Votes	%
UNP	26,108	51.55%	226,582	53.11%	4,706,366	48.43%
UPFA	23,736	46.87%	192,734	45.18%	4,887,152	50.29%
Other Parties (with < 1%)	801	1.58%	7,283	1.71%	123,521	1.27%
Valid Votes	50,645	98.75%	426,599	98.43%	9,717,039	98.88%
Rejected Votes	640	1.25%	6,825	1.57%	109,869	1.12%
Total Polled	51,285	79.54%	433,424	78.67%	9,826,908	69.51%
Registered Electors	64,481		550,926		14,136,979	

=== 1999 Sri Lankan Presidential Election ===
Party	Welimada		Badulla Electoral District		Sri Lanka	
Party	Votes	%	Votes	%	Votes	%
UNP	20,447	47.38%	172,884	47.97%	3,602,748	42.71%
PA	20,063	46.49%	167,000	46.33%	4,312,157	51.12%
JVP	1,665	3.86%	12,025	3.34%	343,927	4.08%
Other Parties (with < 1%)	981	2.27%	8,512	2.36%	176,679	2.09%
Valid Votes	43,156	97.29%	360,421	97.04%	8,435,754	97.69%
Rejected Votes	1,203	2.71%	10,979	2.96%	199,536	2.31%
Total Polled	44,359	78.97%	371,400	78.25%	8,635,290	72.17%
Registered Electors	56,170		474,610		11,965,536	

=== 1994 Sri Lankan Presidential Election ===
Party	Welimada		Badulla Electoral District		Sri Lanka	
Party	Votes	%	Votes	%	Votes	%
PA	22,177	55.23%	182,810	55.27%	4,709,205	62.28%
UNP	17,280	43.04%	139,611	42.21%	2,715,283	35.91%
Other Parties (with < 1%)	695	1.73%	8,351	2.52%	137,040	1.81%
Valid Votes	40,152	96.44%	330,772	95.91%	7,561,526	98.03%
Rejected Votes	1,482	3.56%	14,093	4.09%	151,706	1.97%
Total Polled	41,634	77.61%	344,865	77.47%	7,713,232	69.12%
Registered Electors	53,643		445,146		11,158,880	

=== 1988 Sri Lankan Presidential Election ===
Party	Welimada		Badulla Electoral District		Sri Lanka	
Party	Votes	%	Votes	%	Votes	%
UNP	7,491	66.27%	80,779	60.09%	2,569,199	50.43%
SLFP	3,580	31.67%	50,223	37.36%	2,289,857	44.95%
SLMP	232	2.05%	3,422	2.55%	235,701	4.63%
Valid Votes	11,303	97.99%	134,424	97.62%	5,094,754	98.24%
Rejected Votes	232	2.01%	3,276	2.38%	91,499	1.76%
Total Polled	11,535	27.57%	137,700	44.21%	5,186,256	55.87%
Registered Electors	41,846		311,473		9,283,143	

=== 1982 Sri Lankan Presidential Election ===
Party	Welimada		Badulla Electoral District		Sri Lanka	
Party	Votes	%	Votes	%	Votes	%
UNP	18,673	60.64%	141,062	58.67%	3,450,815	52.93%
SLFP	10,078	32.73%	88,462	36.79%	2,546,348	39.05%
JVP	1,745	5.67%	7,713	3.21%	273,428	4.19%
Other Parties (with < 1%)	295	0.96%	3,203	1.33%	249,460	3.83%
Valid Votes	30,791	98.60%	240,440	98.77%	6,520,156	98.78%
Rejected Votes	437	1.40%	2,982	1.23%	80,470	1.22%
Total Polled	31,228	86.44%	243,422	85.47%	6,600,626	80.15%
Registered Electors	36,128		284,801		8,235,358	

== Parliamentary Election Results ==
=== Summary ===
The winner of Welimada has matched the final country result 5 out of 7 times. Hence, Welimada is a Weak Bellwether for Parliamentary Elections.

Year	Welimada	Badulla Electoral District	MAE %	Sri Lanka	MAE %
2015	UNP	UNP	0.90%	UNP	6.84%
2010	UPFA	UPFA	5.99%	UPFA	8.11%
2004	UPFA	UNP	3.25%	UPFA	6.11%
2001	UNP	UNP	0.57%	UNP	4.00%
2000	UNP	UNP	1.07%	PA	3.09%
1994	UNP	UNP	3.92%	PA	3.52%
1989	UNP	UNP	4.38%	UNP	3.46%
Matches/Mean MAE	5/7	4/7	2.87%	7/7	5.02%

=== 2015 Sri Lankan Parliamentary Election ===
Party	Welimada		Badulla Electoral District		Sri Lanka	
Party	Votes	%	Votes	%	Votes	%
UNP	30,086	56.07%	258,844	54.82%	5,098,916	45.77%
UPFA	20,127	37.51%	179,459	38.01%	4,732,664	42.48%
JVP	2,497	4.65%	21,445	4.54%	544,154	4.88%
CWC	687	1.28%	10,259	2.17%	17,107	0.15%
Other Parties (with < 1%)	258	0.48%	2,159	0.46%	76,945	0.69%
Valid Votes	53,655	95.68%	472,166	95.03%	11,140,333	95.35%
Rejected Votes	2,384	4.25%	24,167	4.86%	516,926	4.42%
Total Polled	56,076	75.33%	496,849	80.07%	11,684,111	77.66%
Registered Electors	74,436		620,486		15,044,490	

=== 2010 Sri Lankan Parliamentary Election ===
Party	Welimada		Badulla Electoral District		Sri Lanka	
Party	Votes	%	Votes	%	Votes	%
UPFA	19,820	50.04%	203,689	58.25%	4,846,388	60.38%
UNP	14,070	35.52%	112,886	32.28%	2,357,057	29.37%
IG4B	3,221	8.13%	4,646	1.33%	5,076	0.06%
DNA	1,816	4.58%	15,768	4.51%	441,251	5.50%
UPF	540	1.36%	11,481	3.28%	24,670	0.31%
Other Parties (with < 1%)	141	0.36%	1,208	0.35%	23,594	0.29%
Valid Votes	39,608	93.75%	349,678	93.54%	8,026,322	96.03%
Rejected Votes	2,642	6.25%	24,169	6.46%	581,465	6.96%
Total Polled	42,250	61.29%	373,847	62.46%	8,358,246	59.29%
Registered Electors	68,937		598,521		14,097,690	

=== 2004 Sri Lankan Parliamentary Election ===
Party	Welimada		Badulla Electoral District		Sri Lanka	
Party	Votes	%	Votes	%	Votes	%
UPFA	23,040	51.75%	178,634	48.26%	4,223,126	45.70%
UNP	20,441	45.91%	181,705	49.09%	3,486,792	37.73%
JHU	775	1.74%	6,932	1.87%	552,723	5.98%
Other Parties (with < 1%)	266	0.60%	2,907	0.79%	57,589	0.62%
Valid Votes	44,522	92.04%	370,178	92.47%	9,241,931	94.52%
Rejected Votes	3,851	7.96%	30,159	7.53%	534,452	5.47%
Total Polled	48,373	77.64%	400,337	78.33%	9,777,821	75.74%
Registered Electors	62,308		511,115		12,909,631	

=== 2001 Sri Lankan Parliamentary Election ===
Party	Welimada		Badulla Electoral District		Sri Lanka	
Party	Votes	%	Votes	%	Votes	%
UNP	24,295	53.44%	201,173	53.81%	4,086,026	45.62%
PA	17,253	37.95%	138,443	37.03%	3,330,815	37.19%
JVP	3,413	7.51%	26,820	7.17%	815,353	9.10%
Other Parties (with < 1%)	498	1.10%	7,401	1.98%	79,391	0.89%
Valid Votes	45,459	93.99%	373,837	93.35%	8,955,844	94.77%
Rejected Votes	2,908	6.01%	26,626	6.65%	494,009	5.23%
Total Polled	48,367	81.06%	400,463	81.51%	9,449,878	76.03%
Registered Electors	59,666		491,288		12,428,762	

=== 2000 Sri Lankan Parliamentary Election ===
Party	Welimada		Badulla Electoral District		Sri Lanka	
Party	Votes	%	Votes	%	Votes	%
UNP	19,377	44.49%	167,351	46.36%	3,451,765	40.12%
PA	18,661	42.85%	154,172	42.71%	3,899,329	45.33%
NUA	2,577	5.92%	5,052	1.40%	185,593	2.16%
JVP	1,835	4.21%	16,414	4.55%	518,725	6.03%
CWC	617	1.42%	12,092	3.35%	22,985	0.27%
Other Parties (with < 1%)	486	1.12%	5,935	1.64%	245,839	2.86%
Valid Votes	43,553	N/A	361,016	N/A	8,602,617	N/A

=== 1994 Sri Lankan Parliamentary Election ===
Party	Welimada		Badulla Electoral District		Sri Lanka	
Party	Votes	%	Votes	%	Votes	%
UNP	19,935	49.14%	182,131	54.04%	3,498,370	44.04%
PA	18,811	46.37%	146,546	43.48%	3,887,805	48.94%
IND2	992	2.45%	2,601	0.77%	16,690	0.21%
SLPF	612	1.51%	3,555	1.05%	90,078	1.13%
Other Parties (with < 1%)	219	0.54%	2,226	0.66%	116,737	1.47%
Valid Votes	40,569	92.48%	337,059	92.19%	7,943,688	95.20%
Rejected Votes	3,300	7.52%	28,540	7.81%	400,395	4.80%
Total Polled	43,869	81.78%	365,599	82.23%	8,344,095	74.75%
Registered Electors	53,643		444,632		11,163,064	

=== 1989 Sri Lankan Parliamentary Election ===
Party	Welimada		Badulla Electoral District		Sri Lanka	
Party	Votes	%	Votes	%	Votes	%
UNP	14,743	53.40%	135,089	58.97%	2,838,005	50.71%
SLFP	10,521	38.11%	81,011	35.36%	1,785,369	31.90%
ELJP	1,828	6.62%	5,589	2.44%	67,723	1.21%
USA	380	1.38%	5,712	2.49%	141,983	2.54%
Other Parties (with < 1%)	135	0.49%	1,693	0.74%	90,480	1.62%
Valid Votes	27,607	91.93%	229,094	92.08%	5,596,468	93.87%
Rejected Votes	2,424	8.07%	19,704	7.92%	365,563	6.13%
Total Polled	30,031	72.65%	248,798	75.55%	5,962,031	63.60%
Registered Electors	41,334		329,321		9,374,164	

== Demographics ==
=== Ethnicity ===
The Welimada Polling Division has a Sinhalese majority (70.8%), a significant Moor population (16.6%) and a significant Indian Tamil population (10.4%) . In comparison, the Badulla Electoral District (which contains the Welimada Polling Division) has a Sinhalese majority (73.0%) and a significant Indian Tamil population (18.5%)

Ethnicity in Welimada
1. Sinhalese (70.8%)
2. Moor (16.6%)
3. Indian Tamil (10.4%)
4. Sri Lankan Tamil (2.00%)
5. Other (0.20%)

=== Religion ===
The Welimada Polling Division has a Buddhist majority (70.6%), a significant Muslim population (16.8%) and a significant Hindu population (11.3%) . In comparison, the Badulla Electoral District (which contains the Welimada Polling Division) has a Buddhist majority (72.6%) and a significant Hindu population (19.3%)

Religion in Welimada
1. Buddhist (70.6%)
2. Muslim (16.8%)
3. Hindu (11.3%)
4. Other (1.30%)
