= Raveendra Bandara =

Sri Lankan politician

Hon. Raveendra Bandara MP

Member of Parliament for Badulla
- Incumbent
- Assumed office 15 November 2024

Personal details
- Party: National People's Power
- Profession: Politician

Raveendra Bandara is a Sri Lankan politician. He was elected to the Sri Lankan Parliament from Badulla Electoral District as a member of the National People's Power.

== Electoral history ==
Election	Constituency	Party	Alliance	Votes	Result
2024 parliamentary	Badulla District	JVP	NPP	50822	Elected
