= Mahiyanganaya Polling Division =

Mahiyanganaya
- Polling Division
- Coordinates: 7.392306°N 81.103245°E
- Country: Sri Lanka
- Province: Uva Province, Sri Lanka
- Electoral District: Badulla Electoral District

Area
  - Total: 988.96 km^{2} (381.84 sq mi)

Population (2012)
  - Total: 127,394
  - Density: 129/km^{2} (330/sq mi)
- ISO 3166 code: EC-19A

The Mahiyanganaya Polling Division is a Polling Division in the Badulla Electoral District, in the Uva Province, Sri Lanka.

== Presidential Election Results ==
=== Summary ===
The winner of Mahiyanganaya has matched the final country result 4 out of 8 times.

Year	Mahiyanganaya	Badulla Electoral District	MAE %	Sri Lanka	MAE %
2019	SLPP	SLPP	5.79%	SLPP	3.00%
2015	UPFA	NDF	7.35%	NDF	9.20%
2010	UPFA	UPFA	6.81%	UPFA	2.38%
2005	UNP	UNP	0.74%	UPFA	5.59%
1999	UNP	UNP	6.61%	PA	11.31%
1994	UNP	PA	13.68%	PA	20.40%
1988	UNP	UNP	7.02%	UNP	15.21%
1982	UNP	UNP	13.19%	UNP	16.69%
Matches/Mean MAE	4/8	6/8	7.65%	8/8	10.47%

=== 2019 Sri Lankan Presidential Election ===
Party	Mahiyanganaya		Badulla Electoral District		Sri Lanka	
Party	Votes	%	Votes	%	Votes	%
SLPP	46,267	55.33%	276,211	49.29%	6,924,255	52.25%
NDF	32,345	38.68%	251,706	44.92%	5,564,239	41.99%
NMPP	2,534	3.03%	14,806	2.64%	418,553	3.16%
Other Parties (with < 1%)	2,474	2.96%	17,622	3.14%	345,452	2.61%
Valid Votes	83,620	99.14%	560,345	98.77%	13,252,499	98.99%
Rejected Votes	728	0.86%	6,978	1.23%	135,452	1.01%
Total Polled	84,348	86.56%	567,323	86.25%	13,387,951	83.71%
Registered Electors	97,450		657,766		15,992,568	

=== 2015 Sri Lankan Presidential Election ===
Party	Mahiyanganaya		Badulla Electoral District		Sri Lanka	
Party	Votes	%	Votes	%	Votes	%
UPFA	42,718	56.69%	249,243	49.15%	5,768,090	47.58%
NDF	31,495	41.80%	249,524	49.21%	6,217,162	51.28%
Other Parties (with < 1%)	1,138	1.51%	8,303	1.64%	138,200	1.14%
Valid Votes	75,351	98.78%	507,070	98.47%	12,123,452	98.85%
Rejected Votes	930	1.22%	7,871	1.53%	140,925	1.15%
Total Polled	76,281	79.70%	514,941	79.51%	12,264,377	78.69%
Registered Electors	95,715		647,628		15,585,942	

=== 2010 Sri Lankan Presidential Election ===
Party	Mahiyanganaya		Badulla Electoral District		Sri Lanka	
Party	Votes	%	Votes	%	Votes	%
UPFA	38,486	60.26%	237,579	53.23%	6,015,934	57.88%
NDF	24,057	37.67%	198,835	44.55%	4,173,185	40.15%
Other Parties (with < 1%)	1,320	2.07%	9,880	2.21%	204,494	1.97%
Valid Votes	63,863	99.24%	446,294	98.66%	10,393,613	99.03%
Rejected Votes	491	0.76%	6,083	1.34%	101,838	0.97%
Total Polled	64,354	75.21%	452,377	75.62%	10,495,451	66.70%
Registered Electors	85,562		598,190		15,734,587	

=== 2005 Sri Lankan Presidential Election ===
Party	Mahiyanganaya		Badulla Electoral District		Sri Lanka	
Party	Votes	%	Votes	%	Votes	%
UNP	32,592	53.85%	226,582	53.11%	4,706,366	48.43%
UPFA	26,877	44.41%	192,734	45.18%	4,887,152	50.29%
Other Parties (with < 1%)	1,054	1.74%	7,283	1.71%	123,521	1.27%
Valid Votes	60,523	98.46%	426,599	98.43%	9,717,039	98.88%
Rejected Votes	947	1.54%	6,825	1.57%	109,869	1.12%
Total Polled	61,470	77.82%	433,424	78.67%	9,826,908	69.51%
Registered Electors	78,986		550,926		14,136,979	

=== 1999 Sri Lankan Presidential Election ===
Party	Mahiyanganaya		Badulla Electoral District		Sri Lanka	
Party	Votes	%	Votes	%	Votes	%
UNP	27,638	54.82%	172,884	47.97%	3,602,748	42.71%
PA	19,750	39.17%	167,000	46.33%	4,312,157	51.12%
JVP	1,757	3.48%	12,025	3.34%	343,927	4.08%
Other Parties (with < 1%)	1,273	2.52%	8,512	2.36%	176,679	2.09%
Valid Votes	50,418	97.47%	360,421	97.04%	8,435,754	97.69%
Rejected Votes	1,308	2.53%	10,979	2.96%	199,536	2.31%
Total Polled	51,726	78.46%	371,400	78.25%	8,635,290	72.17%
Registered Electors	65,925		474,610		11,965,536	

=== 1994 Sri Lankan Presidential Election ===
Party	Mahiyanganaya		Badulla Electoral District		Sri Lanka	
Party	Votes	%	Votes	%	Votes	%
UNP	24,842	56.29%	139,611	42.21%	2,715,283	35.91%
PA	18,218	41.28%	182,810	55.27%	4,709,205	62.28%
Other Parties (with < 1%)	629	1.43%	4,504	1.36%	78,152	1.03%
Ind 2	446	1.01%	3,847	1.16%	58,888	0.78%
Valid Votes	44,135	97.13%	330,772	95.91%	7,561,526	98.03%
Rejected Votes	1,302	2.87%	14,093	4.09%	151,706	1.97%
Total Polled	45,437	78.02%	344,865	77.47%	7,713,232	69.12%
Registered Electors	58,235		445,146		11,158,880	

=== 1988 Sri Lankan Presidential Election ===
Party	Mahiyanganaya		Badulla Electoral District		Sri Lanka	
Party	Votes	%	Votes	%	Votes	%
UNP	16,990	67.50%	80,779	60.09%	2,569,199	50.43%
SLFP	7,682	30.52%	50,223	37.36%	2,289,857	44.95%
SLMP	499	1.98%	3,422	2.55%	235,701	4.63%
Valid Votes	25,171	98.30%	134,424	97.62%	5,094,754	98.24%
Rejected Votes	435	1.70%	3,276	2.38%	91,499	1.76%
Total Polled	25,606	54.80%	137,700	44.21%	5,186,256	55.87%
Registered Electors	46,724		311,473		9,283,143	

=== 1982 Sri Lankan Presidential Election ===
Party	Mahiyanganaya		Badulla Electoral District		Sri Lanka	
Party	Votes	%	Votes	%	Votes	%
UNP	21,340	73.21%	141,062	58.67%	3,450,815	52.93%
SLFP	7,076	24.28%	88,462	36.79%	2,546,348	39.05%
JVP	443	1.52%	7,713	3.21%	273,428	4.19%
Other Parties (with < 1%)	289	0.99%	3,203	1.33%	249,460	3.83%
Valid Votes	29,148	99.02%	240,440	98.77%	6,520,156	98.78%
Rejected Votes	287	0.98%	2,982	1.23%	80,470	1.22%
Total Polled	29,435	87.83%	243,422	85.47%	6,600,626	80.15%
Registered Electors	33,514		284,801		8,235,358	

== Parliamentary Election Results ==
=== Summary ===
The winner of Mahiyanganaya has matched the final country result 5 out of 7 times. Hence, Mahiyanganaya is a Weak Bellwether for Parliamentary Elections.

Year	Mahiyanganaya	Badulla Electoral District	MAE %	Sri Lanka	MAE %
2015	UNP	UNP	5.54%	UNP	2.80%
2010	UPFA	UPFA	3.58%	UPFA	2.33%
2004	UPFA	UNP	4.06%	UPFA	6.62%
2001	UNP	UNP	3.83%	UNP	7.19%
2000	UNP	UNP	8.38%	PA	11.47%
1994	UNP	UNP	7.00%	PA	13.69%
1989	UNP	UNP	11.15%	UNP	12.81%
Matches/Mean MAE	5/7	4/7	6.22%	7/7	8.13%

=== 2015 Sri Lankan Parliamentary Election ===
Party	Mahiyanganaya		Badulla Electoral District		Sri Lanka	
Party	Votes	%	Votes	%	Votes	%
UNP	34,447	49.62%	258,844	54.82%	5,098,916	45.77%
UPFA	31,159	44.88%	179,459	38.01%	4,732,664	42.48%
JVP	3,622	5.22%	21,445	4.54%	544,154	4.88%
Other Parties (with < 1%)	199	0.29%	12,418	2.63%	94,052	0.84%
Valid Votes	69,427	96.16%	472,166	95.03%	11,140,333	95.35%
Rejected Votes	2,707	3.75%	24,167	4.86%	516,926	4.42%
Total Polled	72,202	75.43%	496,849	80.07%	11,684,111	77.66%
Registered Electors	95,715		620,486		15,044,490	

=== 2010 Sri Lankan Parliamentary Election ===
Party	Mahiyanganaya		Badulla Electoral District		Sri Lanka	
Party	Votes	%	Votes	%	Votes	%
UPFA	29,903	63.41%	203,689	58.25%	4,846,388	60.38%
UNP	14,613	30.99%	112,886	32.28%	2,357,057	29.37%
DNA	2,433	5.16%	15,768	4.51%	441,251	5.50%
Other Parties (with < 1%)	207	0.44%	17,335	4.96%	53,340	0.66%
Valid Votes	47,156	94.93%	349,678	93.54%	8,026,322	96.03%
Rejected Votes	2,520	5.07%	24,169	6.46%	581,465	6.96%
Total Polled	49,676	58.06%	373,847	62.46%	8,358,246	59.29%
Registered Electors	85,562		598,521		14,097,690	

=== 2004 Sri Lankan Parliamentary Election ===
Party	Mahiyanganaya		Badulla Electoral District		Sri Lanka	
Party	Votes	%	Votes	%	Votes	%
UPFA	27,727	53.02%	178,634	48.26%	4,223,126	45.70%
UNP	23,822	45.56%	181,705	49.09%	3,486,792	37.73%
Other Parties (with < 1%)	742	1.42%	9,839	2.66%	610,312	6.60%
Valid Votes	52,291	93.82%	370,178	92.47%	9,241,931	94.52%
Rejected Votes	3,442	6.18%	30,159	7.53%	534,452	5.47%
Total Polled	55,733	74.95%	400,337	78.33%	9,777,821	75.74%
Registered Electors	74,365		511,115		12,909,631	

=== 2001 Sri Lankan Parliamentary Election ===
Party	Mahiyanganaya		Badulla Electoral District		Sri Lanka	
Party	Votes	%	Votes	%	Votes	%
UNP	30,316	57.76%	201,173	53.81%	4,086,026	45.62%
PA	17,224	32.82%	138,443	37.03%	3,330,815	37.19%
JVP	4,655	8.87%	26,820	7.17%	815,353	9.10%
Other Parties (with < 1%)	287	0.55%	7,401	1.98%	79,391	0.89%
Valid Votes	52,482	94.95%	373,837	93.35%	8,955,844	94.77%
Rejected Votes	2,793	5.05%	26,626	6.65%	494,009	5.23%
Total Polled	55,275	78.21%	400,463	81.51%	9,449,878	76.03%
Registered Electors	70,678		491,288		12,428,762	

=== 2000 Sri Lankan Parliamentary Election ===
Party	Mahiyanganaya		Badulla Electoral District		Sri Lanka	
Party	Votes	%	Votes	%	Votes	%
UNP	28,850	57.13%	167,351	46.36%	3,451,765	40.12%
PA	17,792	35.23%	154,172	42.71%	3,899,329	45.33%
JVP	2,990	5.92%	16,414	4.55%	518,725	6.03%
Other Parties (with < 1%)	869	1.72%	23,079	6.39%	454,417	5.28%
Valid Votes	50,501	N/A	361,016	N/A	8,602,617	N/A

=== 1994 Sri Lankan Parliamentary Election ===
Party	Mahiyanganaya		Badulla Electoral District		Sri Lanka	
Party	Votes	%	Votes	%	Votes	%
UNP	27,956	61.60%	182,131	54.04%	3,498,370	44.04%
PA	16,702	36.80%	146,546	43.48%	3,887,805	48.94%
Other Parties (with < 1%)	722	1.59%	8,382	2.49%	223,505	2.81%
Valid Votes	45,380	93.64%	337,059	92.19%	7,943,688	95.20%
Rejected Votes	3,083	6.36%	28,540	7.81%	400,395	4.80%
Total Polled	48,463	83.22%	365,599	82.23%	8,344,095	74.75%
Registered Electors	58,235		444,632		11,163,064	

=== 1989 Sri Lankan Parliamentary Election ===
Party	Mahiyanganaya		Badulla Electoral District		Sri Lanka	
Party	Votes	%	Votes	%	Votes	%
UNP	25,158	72.22%	135,089	58.97%	2,838,005	50.71%
SLFP	9,120	26.18%	81,011	35.36%	1,785,369	31.90%
ELJP	360	1.03%	5,589	2.44%	67,723	1.21%
Other Parties (with < 1%)	199	0.57%	7,405	3.23%	232,463	4.15%
Valid Votes	34,837	93.70%	229,094	92.08%	5,596,468	93.87%
Rejected Votes	2,341	6.30%	19,704	7.92%	365,563	6.13%
Total Polled	37,178	80.11%	248,798	75.55%	5,962,031	63.60%
Registered Electors	46,406		329,321		9,374,164	

== Demographics ==
=== Ethnicity ===
The Mahiyanganaya Polling Division has a Sinhalese majority (98.2%) . In comparison, the Badulla Electoral District (which contains the Mahiyanganaya Polling Division) has a Sinhalese majority (73.0%) and a significant Indian Tamil population (18.5%)

Ethnicity in Mahiyanganaya
1. Sinhalese (98.2%)
2. Moor (1.50%)
3. Other (0.40%)

=== Religion ===
The Mahiyanganaya Polling Division has a Buddhist majority (97.9%) . In comparison, the Badulla Electoral District (which contains the Mahiyanganaya Polling Division) has a Buddhist majority (72.6%) and a significant Hindu population (19.3%)

Religion in Mahiyanganaya
1. Buddhist (97.9%)
2. Muslim (1.50%)
3. Other (0.60%)
