= Kitnan Selvaraj =

Sri Lankan politician

Hon. Kitnan Selvaraj MP

Member of Parliament for Badulla District
- Incumbent
- Assumed office 21 November 2024

Personal details
- Party: National People's Power

Kitnan Selvaraj is a Sri Lankan politician. He was elected to the Sri Lankan Parliament from Badulla Electoral District as a member of the National People's Power.
