= Uva Paranagama Polling Division =

Uva Paranagama
- Polling Division
- Coordinates: 6.970683°N 80.919063°E
- Country: Sri Lanka
- Province: Uva Province, Sri Lanka
- Electoral District: Badulla Electoral District

Area
  - Total: 127.49 km^{2} (49.22 sq mi)

Population (2012)
  - Total: 77,998
  - Density: 612/km^{2} (1,590/sq mi)
- ISO 3166 code: EC-19F

The Uva Paranagama Polling Division is a Polling Division in the Badulla Electoral District, in the Uva Province, Sri Lanka.

== Presidential Election Results ==
=== Summary ===
The winner of Uva Paranagama has matched the final country result 5 out of 8 times. Hence, Uva Paranagama is a Weak Bellwether for Presidential Elections.

Year	Uva Paranagama	Badulla Electoral District	MAE %	Sri Lanka	MAE %
2019	SLPP	SLPP	1.74%	SLPP	1.07%
2015	UPFA	NDF	2.48%	NDF	4.30%
2010	UPFA	UPFA	2.51%	UPFA	1.94%
2005	UNP	UNP	3.07%	UPFA	1.75%
1999	UNP	UNP	0.25%	PA	4.56%
1994	PA	PA	0.71%	PA	7.31%
1988	UNP	UNP	15.39%	UNP	23.35%
1982	UNP	UNP	3.02%	UNP	7.00%
Matches/Mean MAE	5/8	6/8	3.65%	8/8	6.41%

=== 2019 Sri Lankan Presidential Election ===
Party	Uva Paranagama		Badulla Electoral District		Sri Lanka	
Party	Votes	%	Votes	%	Votes	%
SLPP	27,028	51.23%	276,211	49.29%	6,924,255	52.25%
NDF	22,787	43.19%	251,706	44.92%	5,564,239	41.99%
Other Parties (with < 1%)	1,735	3.29%	17,622	3.14%	345,452	2.61%
NMPP	1,207	2.29%	14,806	2.64%	418,553	3.16%
Valid Votes	52,757	99.05%	560,345	98.77%	13,252,499	98.99%
Rejected Votes	506	0.95%	6,978	1.23%	135,452	1.01%
Total Polled	53,263	86.41%	567,323	86.25%	13,387,951	83.71%
Registered Electors	61,637		657,766		15,992,568	

=== 2015 Sri Lankan Presidential Election ===
Party	Uva Paranagama		Badulla Electoral District		Sri Lanka	
Party	Votes	%	Votes	%	Votes	%
UPFA	25,337	51.74%	249,243	49.15%	5,768,090	47.58%
NDF	22,894	46.75%	249,524	49.21%	6,217,162	51.28%
Other Parties (with < 1%)	735	1.50%	8,303	1.64%	138,200	1.14%
Valid Votes	48,966	98.75%	507,070	98.47%	12,123,452	98.85%
Rejected Votes	621	1.25%	7,871	1.53%	140,925	1.15%
Total Polled	49,587	79.10%	514,941	79.51%	12,264,377	78.69%
Registered Electors	62,689		647,628		15,585,942	

=== 2010 Sri Lankan Presidential Election ===
Party	Uva Paranagama		Badulla Electoral District		Sri Lanka	
Party	Votes	%	Votes	%	Votes	%
UPFA	24,831	55.85%	237,579	53.23%	6,015,934	57.88%
NDF	18,696	42.05%	198,835	44.55%	4,173,185	40.15%
Other Parties (with < 1%)	932	2.10%	9,880	2.21%	204,494	1.97%
Valid Votes	44,459	99.05%	446,294	98.66%	10,393,613	99.03%
Rejected Votes	425	0.95%	6,083	1.34%	101,838	0.97%
Total Polled	44,884	75.47%	452,377	75.62%	10,495,451	66.70%
Registered Electors	59,472		598,190		15,734,587	

=== 2005 Sri Lankan Presidential Election ===
Party	Uva Paranagama		Badulla Electoral District		Sri Lanka	
Party	Votes	%	Votes	%	Votes	%
UNP	22,127	50.04%	226,582	53.11%	4,706,366	48.43%
UPFA	21,387	48.37%	192,734	45.18%	4,887,152	50.29%
Other Parties (with < 1%)	704	1.59%	7,283	1.71%	123,521	1.27%
Valid Votes	44,218	98.69%	426,599	98.43%	9,717,039	98.88%
Rejected Votes	588	1.31%	6,825	1.57%	109,869	1.12%
Total Polled	44,806	80.51%	433,424	78.67%	9,826,908	69.51%
Registered Electors	55,655		550,926		14,136,979	

=== 1999 Sri Lankan Presidential Election ===
Party	Uva Paranagama		Badulla Electoral District		Sri Lanka	
Party	Votes	%	Votes	%	Votes	%
UNP	18,969	48.08%	172,884	47.97%	3,602,748	42.71%
PA	18,433	46.72%	167,000	46.33%	4,312,157	51.12%
JVP	1,401	3.55%	12,025	3.34%	343,927	4.08%
Other Parties (with < 1%)	647	1.64%	8,512	2.36%	176,679	2.09%
Valid Votes	39,450	97.62%	360,421	97.04%	8,435,754	97.69%
Rejected Votes	960	2.38%	10,979	2.96%	199,536	2.31%
Total Polled	40,410	81.54%	371,400	78.25%	8,635,290	72.17%
Registered Electors	49,560		474,610		11,965,536	

=== 1994 Sri Lankan Presidential Election ===
Party	Uva Paranagama		Badulla Electoral District		Sri Lanka	
Party	Votes	%	Votes	%	Votes	%
PA	20,307	54.77%	182,810	55.27%	4,709,205	62.28%
UNP	16,031	43.24%	139,611	42.21%	2,715,283	35.91%
Other Parties (with < 1%)	739	1.99%	8,351	2.52%	137,040	1.81%
Valid Votes	37,077	96.70%	330,772	95.91%	7,561,526	98.03%
Rejected Votes	1,267	3.30%	14,093	4.09%	151,706	1.97%
Total Polled	38,344	81.36%	344,865	77.47%	7,713,232	69.12%
Registered Electors	47,127		445,146		11,158,880	

=== 1988 Sri Lankan Presidential Election ===
Party	Uva Paranagama		Badulla Electoral District		Sri Lanka	
Party	Votes	%	Votes	%	Votes	%
UNP	3,255	76.35%	80,779	60.09%	2,569,199	50.43%
SLFP	956	22.43%	50,223	37.36%	2,289,857	44.95%
SLMP	52	1.22%	3,422	2.55%	235,701	4.63%
Valid Votes	4,263	97.04%	134,424	97.62%	5,094,754	98.24%
Rejected Votes	130	2.96%	3,276	2.38%	91,499	1.76%
Total Polled	4,393	11.40%	137,700	44.21%	5,186,256	55.87%
Registered Electors	38,520		311,473		9,283,143	

=== 1982 Sri Lankan Presidential Election ===
Party	Uva Paranagama		Badulla Electoral District		Sri Lanka	
Party	Votes	%	Votes	%	Votes	%
UNP	17,564	60.58%	141,062	58.67%	3,450,815	52.93%
SLFP	9,251	31.91%	88,462	36.79%	2,546,348	39.05%
JVP	1,851	6.38%	7,713	3.21%	273,428	4.19%
Other Parties (with < 1%)	327	1.13%	3,203	1.33%	249,460	3.83%
Valid Votes	28,993	98.86%	240,440	98.77%	6,520,156	98.78%
Rejected Votes	335	1.14%	2,982	1.23%	80,470	1.22%
Total Polled	29,328	87.10%	243,422	85.47%	6,600,626	80.15%
Registered Electors	33,670		284,801		8,235,358	

== Parliamentary Election Results ==
=== Summary ===
The winner of Uva Paranagama has matched the final country result 6 out of 7 times. Hence, Uva Paranagama is a Strong Bellwether for Parliamentary Elections.

Year	Uva Paranagama	Badulla Electoral District	MAE %	Sri Lanka	MAE %
2015	UNP	UNP	0.47%	UNP	5.58%
2010	UPFA	UPFA	1.68%	UPFA	0.94%
2004	UPFA	UNP	2.83%	UPFA	6.32%
2001	UNP	UNP	2.71%	UNP	4.28%
2000	PA	UNP	2.33%	PA	3.02%
1994	UNP	UNP	1.86%	PA	5.34%
1989	UNP	UNP	1.17%	UNP	6.31%
Matches/Mean MAE	6/7	4/7	1.86%	7/7	4.54%

=== 2015 Sri Lankan Parliamentary Election ===
Party	Uva Paranagama		Badulla Electoral District		Sri Lanka	
Party	Votes	%	Votes	%	Votes	%
UNP	24,636	54.65%	258,844	54.82%	5,098,916	45.77%
UPFA	17,564	38.96%	179,459	38.01%	4,732,664	42.48%
JVP	2,048	4.54%	21,445	4.54%	544,154	4.88%
CWC	653	1.45%	10,259	2.17%	17,107	0.15%
Other Parties (with < 1%)	177	0.39%	2,159	0.46%	76,945	0.69%
Valid Votes	45,078	95.19%	472,166	95.03%	11,140,333	95.35%
Rejected Votes	2,234	4.72%	24,167	4.86%	516,926	4.42%
Total Polled	47,357	75.54%	496,849	80.07%	11,684,111	77.66%
Registered Electors	62,689		620,486		15,044,490	

=== 2010 Sri Lankan Parliamentary Election ===
Party	Uva Paranagama		Badulla Electoral District		Sri Lanka	
Party	Votes	%	Votes	%	Votes	%
UPFA	21,537	60.71%	203,689	58.25%	4,846,388	60.38%
UNP	11,253	31.72%	112,886	32.28%	2,357,057	29.37%
DNA	1,696	4.78%	15,768	4.51%	441,251	5.50%
UPF	625	1.76%	11,481	3.28%	24,670	0.31%
Other Parties (with < 1%)	363	1.02%	5,854	1.67%	28,670	0.36%
Valid Votes	35,474	93.47%	349,678	93.54%	8,026,322	96.03%
Rejected Votes	2,478	6.53%	24,169	6.46%	581,465	6.96%
Total Polled	37,952	63.81%	373,847	62.46%	8,358,246	59.29%
Registered Electors	59,472		598,521		14,097,690	

=== 2004 Sri Lankan Parliamentary Election ===
Party	Uva Paranagama		Badulla Electoral District		Sri Lanka	
Party	Votes	%	Votes	%	Votes	%
UPFA	19,946	51.54%	178,634	48.26%	4,223,126	45.70%
UNP	18,030	46.59%	181,705	49.09%	3,486,792	37.73%
Other Parties (with < 1%)	723	1.87%	9,839	2.66%	610,312	6.60%
Valid Votes	38,699	92.20%	370,178	92.47%	9,241,931	94.52%
Rejected Votes	3,275	7.80%	30,159	7.53%	534,452	5.47%
Total Polled	41,974	78.18%	400,337	78.33%	9,777,821	75.74%
Registered Electors	53,690		511,115		12,909,631	

=== 2001 Sri Lankan Parliamentary Election ===
Party	Uva Paranagama		Badulla Electoral District		Sri Lanka	
Party	Votes	%	Votes	%	Votes	%
UNP	20,496	51.52%	201,173	53.81%	4,086,026	45.62%
PA	16,287	40.94%	138,443	37.03%	3,330,815	37.19%
JVP	2,772	6.97%	26,820	7.17%	815,353	9.10%
Other Parties (with < 1%)	226	0.57%	7,401	1.98%	79,391	0.89%
Valid Votes	39,781	93.69%	373,837	93.35%	8,955,844	94.77%
Rejected Votes	2,681	6.31%	26,626	6.65%	494,009	5.23%
Total Polled	42,462	82.03%	400,463	81.51%	9,449,878	76.03%
Registered Electors	51,763		491,288		12,428,762	

=== 2000 Sri Lankan Parliamentary Election ===
Party	Uva Paranagama		Badulla Electoral District		Sri Lanka	
Party	Votes	%	Votes	%	Votes	%
PA	18,162	46.96%	154,172	42.71%	3,899,329	45.33%
UNP	17,582	45.46%	167,351	46.36%	3,451,765	40.12%
JVP	1,815	4.69%	16,414	4.55%	518,725	6.03%
Other Parties (with < 1%)	720	1.86%	10,987	3.04%	431,432	5.02%
CWC	394	1.02%	12,092	3.35%	22,985	0.27%
Valid Votes	38,673	N/A	361,016	N/A	8,602,617	N/A

=== 1994 Sri Lankan Parliamentary Election ===
Party	Uva Paranagama		Badulla Electoral District		Sri Lanka	
Party	Votes	%	Votes	%	Votes	%
UNP	19,310	52.05%	182,131	54.04%	3,498,370	44.04%
PA	16,792	45.26%	146,546	43.48%	3,887,805	48.94%
SLPF	520	1.40%	3,555	1.05%	90,078	1.13%
Other Parties (with < 1%)	480	1.29%	4,827	1.43%	133,427	1.68%
Valid Votes	37,102	92.30%	337,059	92.19%	7,943,688	95.20%
Rejected Votes	3,095	7.70%	28,540	7.81%	400,395	4.80%
Total Polled	40,197	85.30%	365,599	82.23%	8,344,095	74.75%
Registered Electors	47,127		444,632		11,163,064	

=== 1989 Sri Lankan Parliamentary Election ===
Party	Uva Paranagama		Badulla Electoral District		Sri Lanka	
Party	Votes	%	Votes	%	Votes	%
UNP	15,835	59.92%	135,089	58.97%	2,838,005	50.71%
SLFP	9,739	36.85%	81,011	35.36%	1,785,369	31.90%
ELJP	344	1.30%	5,589	2.44%	67,723	1.21%
MEP	337	1.28%	1,693	0.74%	90,480	1.62%
Other Parties (with < 1%)	171	0.65%	5,712	2.49%	141,983	2.54%
Valid Votes	26,426	88.51%	229,094	92.08%	5,596,468	93.87%
Rejected Votes	3,429	11.49%	19,704	7.92%	365,563	6.13%
Total Polled	29,855	78.02%	248,798	75.55%	5,962,031	63.60%
Registered Electors	38,268		329,321		9,374,164	

== Demographics ==
=== Ethnicity ===
The Uva Paranagama Polling Division has a Sinhalese majority (83.8%) and a significant Indian Tamil population (11.2%) . In comparison, the Badulla Electoral District (which contains the Uva Paranagama Polling Division) has a Sinhalese majority (73.0%) and a significant Indian Tamil population (18.5%)

Ethnicity in Uva Paranagama
1. Sinhalese (83.8%)
2. Indian Tamil (11.2%)
3. Moor (2.90%)
4. Sri Lankan Tamil (2.10%)
5. Other (0.10%)

=== Religion ===
The Uva Paranagama Polling Division has a Buddhist majority (83.8%) and a significant Hindu population (12.3%) . In comparison, the Badulla Electoral District (which contains the Uva Paranagama Polling Division) has a Buddhist majority (72.6%) and a significant Hindu population (19.3%)

Religion in Uva Paranagama
1. Buddhist (83.8%)
2. Hindu (12.3%)
3. Muslim (2.90%)
4. Other (1.00%)
