= Rohana Pushpakumara =

Sri Lankan politician

Rohana Pushpakumara is a Sri Lankan politician, a member of the Parliament of Sri Lanka. He belongs to the Sri Lanka Freedom Party.
