= Kelaniya Polling Division =

Kelaniya
- Polling Division
- Coordinates: 6.971994°N 79.910036°E
- Country: Sri Lanka
- Province: Western Province, Sri Lanka
- Electoral District: Gampaha Electoral District

Area
  - Total: 23.44 km^{2} (9.05 sq mi)

Population (2012)
  - Total: 137,339
  - Density: 5,859/km^{2} (15,170/sq mi)
- ISO 3166 code: EC-02M

The Kelaniya Polling Division is a Polling Division in the Gampaha Electoral District, in the Western Province, Sri Lanka.

== Presidential Election Results ==
=== Summary ===
In seven of the eight presidential elections considered, the winning candidate in Kelaniya also won the national election.

Year	Kelaniya	Gampaha Electoral District	MAE %	Sri Lanka	MAE %
2019	SLPP	SLPP	1.71%	SLPP	5.21%
2015	NDF	NDF	3.33%	NDF	1.66%
2010	UPFA	UPFA	4.68%	UPFA	1.30%
2005	UPFA	UPFA	1.64%	UPFA	2.65%
1999	PA	PA	1.91%	PA	3.23%
1994	PA	PA	0.23%	PA	2.03%
1988	SLFP	SLFP	1.36%	UNP	4.20%
1982	UNP	UNP	1.45%	UNP	1.10%
Matches/Mean MAE	7/8	7/8	2.04%	8/8	2.67%

=== 2019 Sri Lankan Presidential Election ===
Party	Kelaniya		Gampaha Electoral District		Sri Lanka	
Party	Votes	%	Votes	%	Votes	%
SLPP	43,668	57.57%	855,870	59.28%	6,924,255	52.25%
NDF	27,521	36.28%	494,671	34.26%	5,564,239	41.99%
NMPP	3,134	4.13%	61,760	4.28%	418,553	3.16%
Other Parties (with < 1%)	1,532	2.02%	31,499	2.18%	345,452	2.61%
Valid Votes	75,855	98.83%	1,443,800	98.92%	13,252,499	98.99%
Rejected Votes	899	1.17%	15,751	1.08%	135,452	1.01%
Total Polled	76,754	81.67%	1,459,551	83.31%	13,387,951	83.71%
Registered Electors	93,979		1,751,892		15,992,568	

=== 2015 Sri Lankan Presidential Election ===
Party	Kelaniya		Gampaha Electoral District		Sri Lanka	
Party	Votes	%	Votes	%	Votes	%
NDF	37,884	53.16%	669,007	49.83%	6,217,162	51.28%
UPFA	32,856	46.11%	664,347	49.49%	5,768,090	47.58%
Other Parties (with < 1%)	520	0.73%	9,142	0.68%	138,200	1.14%
Valid Votes	71,260	98.81%	1,342,496	98.92%	12,123,452	98.85%
Rejected Votes	859	1.19%	14,647	1.08%	140,925	1.15%
Total Polled	72,119	80.02%	1,357,143	80.77%	12,264,377	78.69%
Registered Electors	90,122		1,680,263		15,585,942	

=== 2010 Sri Lankan Presidential Election ===
Party	Kelaniya		Gampaha Electoral District		Sri Lanka	
Party	Votes	%	Votes	%	Votes	%
UPFA	36,242	56.92%	718,716	61.66%	6,015,934	57.88%
NDF	26,740	42.00%	434,506	37.28%	4,173,185	40.15%
Other Parties (with < 1%)	689	1.08%	12,426	1.07%	204,494	1.97%
Valid Votes	63,671	99.09%	1,165,648	99.24%	10,393,613	99.03%
Rejected Votes	584	0.91%	8,960	0.76%	101,838	0.97%
Total Polled	64,255	77.32%	1,174,608	78.03%	10,495,451	66.70%
Registered Electors	83,105		1,505,363		15,734,587	

=== 2005 Sri Lankan Presidential Election ===
Party	Kelaniya		Gampaha Electoral District		Sri Lanka	
Party	Votes	%	Votes	%	Votes	%
UPFA	33,179	53.18%	596,698	54.78%	4,887,152	50.29%
UNP	28,676	45.96%	481,764	44.23%	4,706,366	48.43%
Other Parties (with < 1%)	532	0.85%	10,815	0.99%	123,521	1.27%
Valid Votes	62,387	98.88%	1,089,277	98.94%	9,717,039	98.88%
Rejected Votes	708	1.12%	11,724	1.06%	109,869	1.12%
Total Polled	63,095	78.57%	1,101,001	79.17%	9,826,908	69.51%
Registered Electors	80,301		1,390,691		14,136,979	

=== 1999 Sri Lankan Presidential Election ===
Party	Kelaniya		Gampaha Electoral District		Sri Lanka	
Party	Votes	%	Votes	%	Votes	%
PA	30,947	54.11%	532,796	56.58%	4,312,157	51.12%
UNP	22,215	38.84%	353,969	37.59%	3,602,748	42.71%
JVP	2,940	5.14%	40,472	4.30%	343,927	4.08%
Other Parties (with < 1%)	1,088	1.90%	14,382	1.53%	176,679	2.09%
Valid Votes	57,190	97.31%	941,619	97.84%	8,435,754	97.69%
Rejected Votes	1,582	2.69%	20,768	2.16%	199,536	2.31%
Total Polled	58,772	75.91%	962,387	77.12%	8,635,290	72.17%
Registered Electors	77,425		1,247,860		11,965,536	

=== 1994 Sri Lankan Presidential Election ===
Party	Kelaniya		Gampaha Electoral District		Sri Lanka	
Party	Votes	%	Votes	%	Votes	%
PA	35,601	64.48%	550,654	64.74%	4,709,205	62.28%
UNP	18,825	34.09%	288,608	33.93%	2,715,283	35.91%
Other Parties (with < 1%)	789	1.43%	11,256	1.32%	137,040	1.81%
Valid Votes	55,215	98.36%	850,518	98.48%	7,561,526	98.03%
Rejected Votes	920	1.64%	13,137	1.52%	151,706	1.97%
Total Polled	56,135	71.79%	863,655	74.16%	7,713,232	69.12%
Registered Electors	78,191		1,164,625		11,158,880	

=== 1988 Sri Lankan Presidential Election ===
Party	Kelaniya		Gampaha Electoral District		Sri Lanka	
Party	Votes	%	Votes	%	Votes	%
SLFP	22,877	48.70%	355,553	48.83%	2,289,857	44.95%
UNP	21,395	45.55%	350,092	48.08%	2,569,199	50.43%
SLMP	2,700	5.75%	22,467	3.09%	235,701	4.63%
Valid Votes	46,972	98.55%	728,112	98.63%	5,094,754	98.24%
Rejected Votes	690	1.45%	10,108	1.37%	91,499	1.76%
Total Polled	47,662	72.26%	738,220	74.93%	5,186,256	55.87%
Registered Electors	65,961		985,206		9,283,143	

=== 1982 Sri Lankan Presidential Election ===
Party	Kelaniya		Gampaha Electoral District		Sri Lanka	
Party	Votes	%	Votes	%	Votes	%
UNP	24,732	53.33%	365,847	52.50%	3,450,815	52.93%
SLFP	19,050	41.08%	301,808	43.31%	2,546,348	39.05%
JVP	2,179	4.70%	23,701	3.40%	273,428	4.19%
Other Parties (with < 1%)	411	0.89%	5,491	0.79%	249,460	3.83%
Valid Votes	46,372	98.98%	696,847	99.15%	6,520,156	98.78%
Rejected Votes	480	1.02%	5,992	0.85%	80,470	1.22%
Total Polled	46,852	79.86%	702,839	82.70%	6,600,626	80.15%
Registered Electors	58,671		849,896		8,235,358	

== Parliamentary Election Results ==
=== Summary ===
The winner of Kelaniya has matched the final country result 7 out of 7 times. Hence, Kelaniya is a bellwether for parliamentary elections.

Year	Kelaniya	Gampaha Electoral District	MAE %	Sri Lanka	MAE %
2015	UNP	UNP	1.25%	UNP	1.40%
2010	UPFA	UPFA	4.48%	UPFA	2.37%
2004	UPFA	UPFA	5.03%	UPFA	2.04%
2001	UNP	UNP	2.52%	UNP	1.15%
2000	PA	PA	4.07%	PA	2.03%
1994	PA	PA	0.67%	PA	5.46%
1989	UNP	UNP	1.76%	UNP	3.35%
Matches/Mean MAE	7/7	7/7	2.83%	7/7	2.54%

=== 2020 Sri Lankan Parliamentary Election ===
Party	Kelaniya		Gampaha Electoral District		Sri Lanka	
Party	Votes	%	Votes	%	Votes	%
SLPFA	39,172	60.96%	807,896	65.76%	6,853,693	59.09%
SJB	17,684	27.52%	285,809	23.27%	2,771,984	23.9%
JJB	3,421	5.32%	61,833	5.03%	445,958	3.84%
UNP	1,501	2.34%	28,282	2.3%	249,435	2.15%
OPPP	1,045	1.63%	21,627	1.76%	67,766	0.58%
Other Parties (with < 1%)	1,438	2.23%	23,027	1.88%	1,160,093	10.44%
Valid Votes	64,261	67.68%	1,228,474	68.78%	11,598,936	71.32%
Rejected Votes	4,090	4.31%	75,509	4.23%	744,373	4.58%
Total Polled	68,351	71.99%	1,303,983	73.01%	12,343,309	75.89%
Registered Electors	94,950		1,785,964		16,263,885	

=== 2015 Sri Lankan Parliamentary Election ===
Party	Kelaniya		Gampaha Electoral District		Sri Lanka	
Party	Votes	%	Votes	%	Votes	%
UNP	31,501	47.93%	577,004	47.17%	5,098,916	45.77%
UPFA	28,323	43.10%	549,958	44.96%	4,732,664	42.48%
JVP	5,206	7.92%	87,880	7.18%	544,154	4.88%
Other Parties (with < 1%)	688	1.05%	8,332	0.68%	81,501	0.73%
Valid Votes	65,718	95.55%	1,223,174	95.51%	11,140,333	95.35%
Rejected Votes	3,024	4.40%	56,246	4.39%	516,926	4.42%
Total Polled	68,782	76.32%	1,280,647	78.21%	11,684,111	77.66%
Registered Electors	90,122		1,637,537		15,044,490	

=== 2010 Sri Lankan Parliamentary Election ===
Party	Kelaniya		Gampaha Electoral District		Sri Lanka	
Party	Votes	%	Votes	%	Votes	%
UPFA	30,276	57.95%	589,476	63.40%	4,846,388	60.38%
UNP	16,479	31.54%	266,523	28.67%	2,357,057	29.37%
DNA	5,322	10.19%	69,747	7.50%	441,251	5.50%
Other Parties (with < 1%)	170	0.33%	3,985	0.43%	19,003	0.24%
Valid Votes	52,247	95.08%	929,731	94.83%	8,026,322	96.03%
Rejected Votes	2,668	4.86%	50,234	5.12%	581,465	6.96%
Total Polled	54,953	66.12%	980,467	65.06%	8,358,246	59.29%
Registered Electors	83,105		1,506,969		14,097,690	

=== 2004 Sri Lankan Parliamentary Election ===
Party	Kelaniya		Gampaha Electoral District		Sri Lanka	
Party	Votes	%	Votes	%	Votes	%
UPFA	25,774	43.88%	509,963	51.52%	4,223,126	45.70%
UNP	21,450	36.52%	367,572	37.14%	3,486,792	37.73%
JHU	10,956	18.65%	102,516	10.36%	552,723	5.98%
Other Parties (with < 1%)	556	0.95%	9,691	0.98%	57,229	0.62%
Valid Votes	58,736	95.12%	989,742	95.96%	9,241,931	94.52%
Rejected Votes	2,996	4.85%	41,462	4.02%	534,452	5.47%
Total Polled	61,749	76.87%	1,031,464	77.72%	9,777,821	75.74%
Registered Electors	80,329		1,327,145		12,909,631	

=== 2001 Sri Lankan Parliamentary Election ===
Party	Kelaniya		Gampaha Electoral District		Sri Lanka	
Party	Votes	%	Votes	%	Votes	%
UNP	27,174	45.65%	437,289	43.94%	4,086,026	45.62%
PA	23,419	39.34%	428,780	43.08%	3,330,815	37.19%
JVP	7,589	12.75%	113,990	11.45%	815,353	9.10%
SU	932	1.57%	8,105	0.81%	50,665	0.57%
Other Parties (with < 1%)	417	0.70%	7,066	0.71%	87,161	0.97%
Valid Votes	59,531	95.92%	995,230	96.30%	8,955,844	94.77%
Rejected Votes	2,532	4.08%	38,187	3.70%	494,009	5.23%
Total Polled	62,063	78.35%	1,033,417	80.36%	9,449,878	76.03%
Registered Electors	79,217		1,285,973		12,428,762	

=== 2000 Sri Lankan Parliamentary Election ===
Party	Kelaniya		Gampaha Electoral District		Sri Lanka	
Party	Votes	%	Votes	%	Votes	%
PA	24,734	42.85%	470,018	48.87%	3,899,329	45.33%
UNP	24,045	41.66%	378,328	39.34%	3,451,765	40.12%
JVP	5,651	9.79%	73,110	7.60%	518,725	6.03%
SU	2,292	3.97%	20,297	2.11%	127,859	1.49%
Other Parties (with < 1%)	994	1.72%	19,956	2.08%	319,123	3.71%
Valid Votes	57,716	N/A	961,709	N/A	8,602,617	N/A

=== 1994 Sri Lankan Parliamentary Election ===
Party	Kelaniya		Gampaha Electoral District		Sri Lanka	
Party	Votes	%	Votes	%	Votes	%
PA	32,961	57.05%	509,030	56.79%	3,887,805	48.94%
UNP	23,504	40.68%	375,631	41.91%	3,498,370	44.04%
SLPF	1,314	2.27%	11,627	1.30%	90,078	1.13%
Valid Votes	57,779	96.22%	896,288	96.39%	7,943,688	95.20%
Rejected Votes	2,271	3.78%	33,553	3.61%	400,395	4.80%
Total Polled	60,050	76.80%	929,841	79.65%	8,344,095	74.75%
Registered Electors	78,191		1,167,469		11,163,064	

=== 1989 Sri Lankan Parliamentary Election ===
Party	Kelaniya		Gampaha Electoral District		Sri Lanka	
Party	Votes	%	Votes	%	Votes	%
UNP	23,549	51.45%	385,733	54.14%	2,838,005	50.71%
SLFP	18,716	40.89%	294,490	41.34%	1,785,369	31.90%
USA	3,064	6.69%	21,665	3.04%	141,983	2.54%
Other Parties (with < 1%)	438	0.96%	10,549	1.48%	67,723	1.21%
Valid Votes	45,767	95.43%	712,437	95.64%	5,596,468	93.87%
Rejected Votes	2,190	4.57%	32,497	4.36%	365,563	6.13%
Total Polled	47,957	73.71%	744,934	76.82%	5,962,031	63.60%
Registered Electors	65,066		969,658		9,374,164	

== Demographics ==
=== Ethnicity ===
The Kelaniya Polling Division has a Sinhalese majority (83.8%) . In comparison, the Gampaha Electoral District (which contains the Kelaniya Polling Division) has a Sinhalese majority (90.5%)

Ethnicity in Kelaniya
1. Sinhalese (83.8%)
2. Moor (6.30%)
3. Sri Lankan Tamil (5.90%)
4. Malay (2.30%)
5. Other (1.60%)

=== Religion ===
The Kelaniya Polling Division has a Buddhist majority (74.7%) . In comparison, the Gampaha Electoral District (which contains the Kelaniya Polling Division) has a Buddhist majority (71.3%) and a significant Roman Catholic population (19.5%)

Religion in Kelaniya
1. Buddhist (74.7%)
2. Roman Catholic (9.80%)
3. Muslim (9.10%)
4. Hindu (4.70%)
5. Other Christian (1.70%)
6. Other (0.00%)
