= Yatiyanthota Polling Division =

Yatiyanthota
- Polling Division
- Interactive map of Yatiyanthota
- Coordinates: 7.057316°N 80.371443°E
- Country: Sri Lanka
- Province: Sabaragamuwa Province, Sri Lanka
- Electoral District: Kegalle Electoral District

Area
  - Total: 306.09 km^{2} (118.18 sq mi)

Population (2012)
  - Total: 108,191
  - Density: 353/km^{2} (910/sq mi)
- ISO 3166 code: EC-22G

The Yatiyanthota Polling Division is a Polling Division in the Kegalle Electoral District, in the Sabaragamuwa Province, Sri Lanka.

== Presidential Election Results ==
=== Summary ===
The winner of Yatiyanthota has matched the final country result 6 out of 8 times. Hence, Yatiyanthota is a Weak Bellwether for Presidential Elections.

Year	Yatiyanthota	Kegalle Electoral District	MAE %	Sri Lanka	MAE %
2019	SLPP	SLPP	4.20%	SLPP	1.42%
2015	UPFA	UPFA	0.94%	NDF	5.14%
2010	UPFA	UPFA	2.27%	UPFA	1.53%
2005	UNP	UPFA	2.58%	UPFA	1.85%
1999	PA	PA	0.83%	PA	0.90%
1994	PA	PA	2.32%	PA	8.50%
1988	UNP	UNP	2.82%	UNP	8.19%
1982	UNP	UNP	3.28%	UNP	6.31%
Matches/Mean MAE	6/8	7/8	2.40%	8/8	4.23%

=== 2019 Sri Lankan Presidential Election ===
Party	Yatiyanthota		Kegalle Electoral District		Sri Lanka	
Party	Votes	%	Votes	%	Votes	%
SLPP	32,753	51.62%	320,484	55.66%	6,924,255	52.25%
NDF	28,215	44.47%	228,032	39.60%	5,564,239	41.99%
Other Parties (with < 1%)	1,489	2.35%	12,272	2.13%	345,452	2.61%
NMPP	990	1.56%	15,043	2.61%	418,553	3.16%
Valid Votes	63,447	98.97%	575,831	99.11%	13,252,499	98.99%
Rejected Votes	659	1.03%	5,152	0.89%	135,452	1.01%
Total Polled	64,106	85.66%	580,983	85.89%	13,387,951	83.71%
Registered Electors	74,836		676,440		15,992,568	

=== 2015 Sri Lankan Presidential Election ===
Party	Yatiyanthota		Kegalle Electoral District		Sri Lanka	
Party	Votes	%	Votes	%	Votes	%
UPFA	30,890	52.62%	278,130	51.82%	5,768,090	47.58%
NDF	26,970	45.94%	252,533	47.05%	6,217,162	51.28%
Other Parties (with < 1%)	843	1.44%	6,108	1.14%	138,200	1.14%
Valid Votes	58,703	98.64%	536,771	98.80%	12,123,452	98.85%
Rejected Votes	809	1.36%	6,515	1.20%	140,925	1.15%
Total Polled	59,512	80.16%	543,286	79.85%	12,264,377	78.69%
Registered Electors	74,244		680,414		15,585,942	

=== 2010 Sri Lankan Presidential Election ===
Party	Yatiyanthota		Kegalle Electoral District		Sri Lanka	
Party	Votes	%	Votes	%	Votes	%
UPFA	31,456	59.25%	296,639	61.80%	6,015,934	57.88%
NDF	20,346	38.32%	174,877	36.44%	4,173,185	40.15%
Other Parties (with < 1%)	1,288	2.43%	8,448	1.76%	204,494	1.97%
Valid Votes	53,090	99.19%	479,964	99.25%	10,393,613	99.03%
Rejected Votes	431	0.81%	3,604	0.75%	101,838	0.97%
Total Polled	53,521	76.50%	483,568	76.11%	10,495,451	66.70%
Registered Electors	69,964		635,342		15,734,587	

=== 2005 Sri Lankan Presidential Election ===
Party	Yatiyanthota		Kegalle Electoral District		Sri Lanka	
Party	Votes	%	Votes	%	Votes	%
UNP	26,056	50.23%	223,483	47.67%	4,706,366	48.43%
UPFA	25,080	48.35%	239,184	51.02%	4,887,152	50.29%
Other Parties (with < 1%)	738	1.42%	6,106	1.30%	123,521	1.27%
Valid Votes	51,874	98.98%	468,773	98.99%	9,717,039	98.88%
Rejected Votes	536	1.02%	4,795	1.01%	109,869	1.12%
Total Polled	52,410	79.73%	473,568	78.68%	9,826,908	69.51%
Registered Electors	65,737		601,872		14,136,979	

=== 1999 Sri Lankan Presidential Election ===
Party	Yatiyanthota		Kegalle Electoral District		Sri Lanka	
Party	Votes	%	Votes	%	Votes	%
PA	22,655	51.03%	210,185	51.30%	4,312,157	51.12%
UNP	19,765	44.52%	176,376	43.05%	3,602,748	42.71%
Other Parties (with < 1%)	1,071	2.41%	8,122	1.98%	176,679	2.09%
JVP	902	2.03%	14,997	3.66%	343,927	4.08%
Valid Votes	44,393	97.80%	409,680	98.05%	8,435,754	97.69%
Rejected Votes	998	2.20%	8,136	1.95%	199,536	2.31%
Total Polled	45,391	75.75%	417,816	76.52%	8,635,290	72.17%
Registered Electors	59,922		546,038		11,965,536	

=== 1994 Sri Lankan Presidential Election ===
Party	Yatiyanthota		Kegalle Electoral District		Sri Lanka	
Party	Votes	%	Votes	%	Votes	%
PA	21,930	53.55%	211,676	56.06%	4,709,205	62.28%
UNP	18,200	44.44%	159,707	42.30%	2,715,283	35.91%
Other Parties (with < 1%)	822	2.01%	6,209	1.64%	137,040	1.81%
Valid Votes	40,952	97.63%	377,592	98.14%	7,561,526	98.03%
Rejected Votes	992	2.37%	7,139	1.86%	151,706	1.97%
Total Polled	41,944	73.16%	384,731	74.84%	7,713,232	69.12%
Registered Electors	57,328		514,055		11,158,880	

=== 1988 Sri Lankan Presidential Election ===
Party	Yatiyanthota		Kegalle Electoral District		Sri Lanka	
Party	Votes	%	Votes	%	Votes	%
UNP	21,614	59.51%	168,720	57.11%	2,569,199	50.43%
SLFP	13,452	37.04%	119,769	40.54%	2,289,857	44.95%
SLMP	1,253	3.45%	6,923	2.34%	235,701	4.63%
Valid Votes	36,319	98.60%	295,412	98.57%	5,094,754	98.24%
Rejected Votes	516	1.40%	4,277	1.43%	91,499	1.76%
Total Polled	36,835	75.70%	299,689	67.98%	5,186,256	55.87%
Registered Electors	48,662		440,836		9,283,143	

=== 1982 Sri Lankan Presidential Election ===
Party	Yatiyanthota		Kegalle Electoral District		Sri Lanka	
Party	Votes	%	Votes	%	Votes	%
UNP	22,889	59.84%	195,444	57.02%	3,450,815	52.93%
SLFP	12,517	32.72%	126,538	36.92%	2,546,348	39.05%
LSSP	1,838	4.80%	6,184	1.80%	58,531	0.90%
JVP	862	2.25%	13,706	4.00%	273,428	4.19%
Other Parties (with < 1%)	147	0.38%	890	0.26%	190,929	2.93%
Valid Votes	38,253	98.02%	342,762	98.69%	6,520,156	98.78%
Rejected Votes	771	1.98%	4,537	1.31%	80,470	1.22%
Total Polled	39,024	85.18%	347,299	84.30%	6,600,626	80.15%
Registered Electors	45,811		411,994		8,235,358	

== Parliamentary Election Results ==
=== Summary ===
The winner of Yatiyanthota has matched the final country result 6 out of 7 times. Hence, Yatiyanthota is a Strong Bellwether for Parliamentary Elections.

Year	Yatiyanthota	Kegalle Electoral District	MAE %	Sri Lanka	MAE %
2015	UNP	UNP	0.37%	UNP	3.38%
2010	UPFA	UPFA	3.19%	UPFA	3.93%
2004	UPFA	UPFA	2.53%	UPFA	5.58%
2001	UNP	UNP	1.43%	UNP	4.33%
2000	PA	PA	1.47%	PA	4.11%
1994	UNP	UNP	3.81%	PA	7.24%
1989	UNP	UNP	7.96%	UNP	13.69%
Matches/Mean MAE	6/7	6/7	2.97%	7/7	6.04%

=== 2015 Sri Lankan Parliamentary Election ===
Party	Yatiyanthota		Kegalle Electoral District		Sri Lanka	
Party	Votes	%	Votes	%	Votes	%
UNP	27,123	49.48%	247,467	49.52%	5,098,916	45.77%
UPFA	25,250	46.07%	227,208	45.47%	4,732,664	42.48%
CWC	1,139	2.08%	2,448	0.49%	17,107	0.15%
JVP	997	1.82%	18,394	3.68%	544,154	4.88%
Other Parties (with < 1%)	304	0.55%	4,213	0.84%	83,938	0.75%
Valid Votes	54,813	95.16%	499,730	96.35%	11,140,333	95.35%
Rejected Votes	2,743	4.76%	18,770	3.62%	516,926	4.42%
Total Polled	57,602	77.58%	518,674	79.81%	11,684,111	77.66%
Registered Electors	74,244		649,878		15,044,490	

=== 2010 Sri Lankan Parliamentary Election ===
Party	Yatiyanthota		Kegalle Electoral District		Sri Lanka	
Party	Votes	%	Votes	%	Votes	%
UPFA	25,522	64.36%	242,463	66.89%	4,846,388	60.38%
UNP	13,404	33.80%	104,925	28.95%	2,357,057	29.37%
DNA	552	1.39%	13,518	3.73%	441,251	5.50%
Other Parties (with < 1%)	174	0.44%	1,549	0.43%	33,973	0.42%
Valid Votes	39,652	91.07%	362,455	93.32%	8,026,322	96.03%
Rejected Votes	3,889	8.93%	25,965	6.68%	581,465	6.96%
Total Polled	43,541	62.23%	388,420	60.93%	8,358,246	59.29%
Registered Electors	69,964		637,524		14,097,690	

=== 2004 Sri Lankan Parliamentary Election ===
Party	Yatiyanthota		Kegalle Electoral District		Sri Lanka	
Party	Votes	%	Votes	%	Votes	%
UPFA	22,081	49.11%	214,267	50.88%	4,223,126	45.70%
UNP	21,500	47.81%	186,641	44.32%	3,486,792	37.73%
JHU	1,083	2.41%	18,034	4.28%	552,723	5.98%
Other Parties (with < 1%)	302	0.67%	2,187	0.52%	59,247	0.64%
Valid Votes	44,966	92.00%	421,134	94.25%	9,241,931	94.52%
Rejected Votes	3,910	8.00%	25,685	5.75%	534,452	5.47%
Total Polled	48,876	76.17%	446,816	78.35%	9,777,821	75.74%
Registered Electors	64,170		570,299		12,909,631	

=== 2001 Sri Lankan Parliamentary Election ===
Party	Yatiyanthota		Kegalle Electoral District		Sri Lanka	
Party	Votes	%	Votes	%	Votes	%
UNP	22,704	49.86%	208,104	49.36%	4,086,026	45.62%
PA	19,508	42.84%	170,901	40.53%	3,330,815	37.19%
JVP	2,678	5.88%	36,711	8.71%	815,353	9.10%
Other Parties (with < 1%)	645	1.42%	5,924	1.40%	123,245	1.38%
Valid Votes	45,535	92.82%	421,640	94.90%	8,955,844	94.77%
Rejected Votes	3,521	7.18%	22,669	5.10%	494,009	5.23%
Total Polled	49,056	78.43%	444,309	80.10%	9,449,878	76.03%
Registered Electors	62,548		554,698		12,428,762	

=== 2000 Sri Lankan Parliamentary Election ===
Party	Yatiyanthota		Kegalle Electoral District		Sri Lanka	
Party	Votes	%	Votes	%	Votes	%
PA	22,659	51.62%	201,114	48.88%	3,899,329	45.33%
UNP	18,738	42.69%	175,627	42.69%	3,451,765	40.12%
JVP	1,347	3.07%	22,028	5.35%	518,725	6.03%
Other Parties (with < 1%)	1,149	2.62%	12,643	3.07%	419,507	4.88%
Valid Votes	43,893	N/A	411,412	N/A	8,602,617	N/A

=== 1994 Sri Lankan Parliamentary Election ===
Party	Yatiyanthota		Kegalle Electoral District		Sri Lanka	
Party	Votes	%	Votes	%	Votes	%
UNP	24,145	55.27%	203,938	51.24%	3,498,370	44.04%
PA	19,340	44.27%	190,689	47.91%	3,887,805	48.94%
Other Parties (with < 1%)	202	0.46%	3,383	0.85%	90,078	1.13%
Valid Votes	43,687	94.37%	398,010	95.89%	7,943,688	95.20%
Rejected Votes	2,604	5.63%	17,043	4.11%	400,395	4.80%
Total Polled	46,291	80.75%	415,053	80.78%	8,344,095	74.75%
Registered Electors	57,328		513,825		11,163,064	

=== 1989 Sri Lankan Parliamentary Election ===
Party	Yatiyanthota		Kegalle Electoral District		Sri Lanka	
Party	Votes	%	Votes	%	Votes	%
UNP	24,062	68.54%	174,334	61.12%	2,838,005	50.71%
SLFP	6,377	18.17%	80,668	28.28%	1,785,369	31.90%
USA	4,248	12.10%	15,168	5.32%	141,983	2.54%
Other Parties (with < 1%)	417	1.19%	15,084	5.29%	158,203	2.83%
Valid Votes	35,104	93.17%	285,254	93.95%	5,596,468	93.87%
Rejected Votes	2,573	6.83%	18,362	6.05%	365,563	6.13%
Total Polled	37,677	78.29%	303,616	69.46%	5,962,031	63.60%
Registered Electors	48,126		437,131		9,374,164	

== Demographics ==
=== Ethnicity ===
The Yatiyanthota Polling Division has a Sinhalese majority (77.3%) and a significant Indian Tamil population (16.5%) . In comparison, the Kegalle Electoral District (which contains the Yatiyanthota Polling Division) has a Sinhalese majority (85.5%)

Ethnicity in Yatiyanthota
1. Sinhalese (77.3%)
2. Indian Tamil (16.5%)
3. Sri Lankan Tamil (3.40%)
4. Moor (2.60%)
5. Other (0.10%)

=== Religion ===
The Yatiyanthota Polling Division has a Buddhist majority (77.0%) and a significant Hindu population (18.2%) . In comparison, the Kegalle Electoral District (which contains the Yatiyanthota Polling Division) has a Buddhist majority (84.4%)

Religion in Yatiyanthota
1. Buddhist (77.0%)
2. Hindu (18.2%)
3. Muslim (2.70%)
4. Roman Catholic (1.10%)
5. Other (1.00%)
