= Negombo Polling Division =

Negombo
- Polling Division
- Coordinates: 7.196967°N 79.839856°E
- Country: Sri Lanka
- Province: Western Province, Sri Lanka
- Electoral District: Gampaha Electoral District

Area
  - Total: 30.36 km^{2} (11.72 sq mi)

Population (2012)
  - Total: 142,136
  - Density: 4,682/km^{2} (12,130/sq mi)
- ISO 3166 code: EC-02B

The Negombo Polling Division is a Polling Division in the Gampaha Electoral District, in the Western Province, Sri Lanka.

== Presidential Election Results ==
=== Summary ===
The winner of Negombo has matched the final country result 5 out of 8 times. Hence, Negombo is a Weak Bellwether for Presidential Elections.

Year	Negombo	Gampaha Electoral District	MAE %	Sri Lanka	MAE %
2019	NDF	SLPP	18.95%	SLPP	12.03%
2015	NDF	NDF	17.26%	NDF	15.52%
2010	NDF	UPFA	15.32%	UPFA	11.83%
2005	UNP	UPFA	17.70%	UPFA	13.35%
1999	PA	PA	8.54%	PA	3.63%
1994	PA	PA	6.52%	PA	4.25%
1988	UNP	SLFP	13.09%	UNP	9.97%
1982	UNP	UNP	13.69%	UNP	11.39%
Matches/Mean MAE	5/8	7/8	13.88%	8/8	10.25%

=== 2019 Sri Lankan Presidential Election ===
Party	Negombo		Gampaha Electoral District		Sri Lanka	
Party	Votes	%	Votes	%	Votes	%
NDF	44,032	53.03%	494,671	34.26%	5,564,239	41.99%
SLPP	31,743	38.23%	855,870	59.28%	6,924,255	52.25%
NMPP	4,132	4.98%	61,760	4.28%	418,553	3.16%
Other Parties (with < 1%)	1,586	1.91%	20,227	1.40%	295,797	2.23%
NPP	1,546	1.86%	11,272	0.78%	49,655	0.37%
Valid Votes	83,039	98.31%	1,443,800	98.92%	13,252,499	98.99%
Rejected Votes	1,430	1.69%	15,751	1.08%	135,452	1.01%
Total Polled	84,469	76.41%	1,459,551	83.31%	13,387,951	83.71%
Registered Electors	110,551		1,751,892		15,992,568	

=== 2015 Sri Lankan Presidential Election ===
Party	Negombo		Gampaha Electoral District		Sri Lanka	
Party	Votes	%	Votes	%	Votes	%
NDF	53,331	67.10%	669,007	49.83%	6,217,162	51.28%
UPFA	25,432	32.00%	664,347	49.49%	5,768,090	47.58%
Other Parties (with < 1%)	719	0.90%	9,142	0.68%	138,200	1.14%
Valid Votes	79,482	98.92%	1,342,496	98.92%	12,123,452	98.85%
Rejected Votes	871	1.08%	14,647	1.08%	140,925	1.15%
Total Polled	80,353	75.65%	1,357,143	80.77%	12,264,377	78.69%
Registered Electors	106,213		1,680,263		15,585,942	

=== 2010 Sri Lankan Presidential Election ===
Party	Negombo		Gampaha Electoral District		Sri Lanka	
Party	Votes	%	Votes	%	Votes	%
NDF	36,669	52.59%	434,506	37.28%	4,173,185	40.15%
UPFA	32,125	46.08%	718,716	61.66%	6,015,934	57.88%
Other Parties (with < 1%)	929	1.33%	12,426	1.07%	204,494	1.97%
Valid Votes	69,723	99.08%	1,165,648	99.24%	10,393,613	99.03%
Rejected Votes	650	0.92%	8,960	0.76%	101,838	0.97%
Total Polled	70,373	73.28%	1,174,608	78.03%	10,495,451	66.70%
Registered Electors	96,028		1,505,363		15,734,587	

=== 2005 Sri Lankan Presidential Election ===
Party	Negombo		Gampaha Electoral District		Sri Lanka	
Party	Votes	%	Votes	%	Votes	%
UNP	40,805	62.01%	481,764	44.23%	4,706,366	48.43%
UPFA	24,236	36.83%	596,698	54.78%	4,887,152	50.29%
Other Parties (with < 1%)	761	1.16%	10,815	0.99%	123,521	1.27%
Valid Votes	65,802	98.80%	1,089,277	98.94%	9,717,039	98.88%
Rejected Votes	799	1.20%	11,724	1.06%	109,869	1.12%
Total Polled	66,601	74.53%	1,101,001	79.17%	9,826,908	69.51%
Registered Electors	89,361		1,390,691		14,136,979	

=== 1999 Sri Lankan Presidential Election ===
Party	Negombo		Gampaha Electoral District		Sri Lanka	
Party	Votes	%	Votes	%	Votes	%
PA	28,515	48.48%	532,796	56.58%	4,312,157	51.12%
UNP	28,156	47.87%	353,969	37.59%	3,602,748	42.71%
JVP	1,360	2.31%	40,472	4.30%	343,927	4.08%
Other Parties (with < 1%)	791	1.34%	14,382	1.53%	176,679	2.09%
Valid Votes	58,822	98.03%	941,619	97.84%	8,435,754	97.69%
Rejected Votes	1,181	1.97%	20,768	2.16%	199,536	2.31%
Total Polled	60,003	71.85%	962,387	77.12%	8,635,290	72.17%
Registered Electors	83,508		1,247,860		11,965,536	

=== 1994 Sri Lankan Presidential Election ===
Party	Negombo		Gampaha Electoral District		Sri Lanka	
Party	Votes	%	Votes	%	Votes	%
PA	31,648	58.23%	550,654	64.74%	4,709,205	62.28%
UNP	22,131	40.72%	288,608	33.93%	2,715,283	35.91%
Other Parties (with < 1%)	569	1.05%	11,256	1.32%	137,040	1.81%
Valid Votes	54,348	98.62%	850,518	98.48%	7,561,526	98.03%
Rejected Votes	761	1.38%	13,137	1.52%	151,706	1.97%
Total Polled	55,109	68.38%	863,655	74.16%	7,713,232	69.12%
Registered Electors	80,589		1,164,625		11,158,880	

=== 1988 Sri Lankan Presidential Election ===
Party	Negombo		Gampaha Electoral District		Sri Lanka	
Party	Votes	%	Votes	%	Votes	%
UNP	29,016	61.30%	350,092	48.08%	2,569,199	50.43%
SLFP	16,601	35.07%	355,553	48.83%	2,289,857	44.95%
SLMP	1,720	3.63%	22,467	3.09%	235,701	4.63%
Valid Votes	47,337	98.78%	728,112	98.63%	5,094,754	98.24%
Rejected Votes	587	1.22%	10,108	1.37%	91,499	1.76%
Total Polled	47,924	70.22%	738,220	74.93%	5,186,256	55.87%
Registered Electors	68,250		985,206		9,283,143	

=== 1982 Sri Lankan Presidential Election ===
Party	Negombo		Gampaha Electoral District		Sri Lanka	
Party	Votes	%	Votes	%	Votes	%
UNP	30,346	67.14%	365,847	52.50%	3,450,815	52.93%
SLFP	13,345	29.52%	301,808	43.31%	2,546,348	39.05%
JVP	1,049	2.32%	23,701	3.40%	273,428	4.19%
Other Parties (with < 1%)	460	1.02%	5,491	0.79%	249,460	3.83%
Valid Votes	45,200	99.10%	696,847	99.15%	6,520,156	98.78%
Rejected Votes	412	0.90%	5,992	0.85%	80,470	1.22%
Total Polled	45,612	76.17%	702,839	82.70%	6,600,626	80.15%
Registered Electors	59,884		849,896		8,235,358	

== Parliamentary Election Results ==
=== Summary ===
The winner of Negombo has matched the final country result 5 out of 7 times. Hence, Negombo is a Weak Bellwether for Parliamentary Elections.

Year	Negombo	Gampaha Electoral District	MAE %	Sri Lanka	MAE %
2015	UNP	UNP	18.14%	UNP	16.88%
2010	UPFA	UPFA	14.19%	UPFA	11.78%
2004	UNP	UPFA	13.48%	UPFA	9.45%
2001	UNP	UNP	9.88%	UNP	6.33%
2000	UNP	PA	7.50%	PA	5.23%
1994	PA	PA	7.12%	PA	2.93%
1989	UNP	UNP	12.40%	UNP	9.39%
Matches/Mean MAE	5/7	7/7	11.81%	7/7	8.85%

=== 2020 Sri Lankan Parliamentary Election ===
Party	Negombo		Gampaha Electoral District		Sri Lanka	
Party	Votes	%	Votes	%	Votes	%
SLPFA	36,536	52.04%	807,896	65.76%	6,853,693	59.09%
SJB	25,023	35.64%	285,809	23.27%	2,771,984	23.9%
JJB	3,834	5.46%	61,833	5.03%	445,958	3.84%
UNP	2,784	3.97%	28,282	2.3%	249,435	2.15%
Other Parties (with < 1%)	2,035	2.89%	44,654	3.64%	1,227,859	11.02%
Valid Votes	70,212	62.68%	1,228,474	68.78%	11,598,936	71.32%
Rejected Votes	5,780	5.16%	75,509	4.23%	744,373	4.58%
Total Polled	75,992	67.84%	1,303,983	73.01%	12,343,309	75.89%
Registered Electors	112,012		1,785,964		16,263,885	

=== 2015 Sri Lankan Parliamentary Election ===
Party	Negombo		Gampaha Electoral District		Sri Lanka	
Party	Votes	%	Votes	%	Votes	%
UNP	48,517	67.67%	577,004	47.17%	5,098,916	45.77%
UPFA	18,928	26.40%	549,958	44.96%	4,732,664	42.48%
JVP	3,902	5.44%	87,880	7.18%	544,154	4.88%
Other Parties (with < 1%)	348	0.49%	8,332	0.68%	81,501	0.73%
Valid Votes	71,695	94.38%	1,223,174	95.51%	11,140,333	95.35%
Rejected Votes	4,191	5.52%	56,246	4.39%	516,926	4.42%
Total Polled	75,962	71.52%	1,280,647	78.21%	11,684,111	77.66%
Registered Electors	106,213		1,637,537		15,044,490	

=== 2010 Sri Lankan Parliamentary Election ===
Party	Negombo		Gampaha Electoral District		Sri Lanka	
Party	Votes	%	Votes	%	Votes	%
UPFA	26,076	48.28%	589,476	63.40%	4,846,388	60.38%
UNP	23,987	44.41%	266,523	28.67%	2,357,057	29.37%
DNA	3,463	6.41%	69,747	7.50%	441,251	5.50%
Other Parties (with < 1%)	488	0.90%	3,985	0.43%	19,003	0.24%
Valid Votes	54,014	93.53%	929,731	94.83%	8,026,322	96.03%
Rejected Votes	3,711	6.43%	50,234	5.12%	581,465	6.96%
Total Polled	57,750	60.14%	980,467	65.06%	8,358,246	59.29%
Registered Electors	96,028		1,506,969		14,097,690	

=== 2004 Sri Lankan Parliamentary Election ===
Party	Negombo		Gampaha Electoral District		Sri Lanka	
Party	Votes	%	Votes	%	Votes	%
UNP	33,709	55.52%	367,572	37.14%	3,486,792	37.73%
UPFA	24,357	40.12%	509,963	51.52%	4,223,126	45.70%
JHU	1,759	2.90%	102,516	10.36%	552,723	5.98%
Other Parties (with < 1%)	886	1.46%	9,691	0.98%	57,229	0.62%
Valid Votes	60,711	95.51%	989,742	95.96%	9,241,931	94.52%
Rejected Votes	2,842	4.47%	41,462	4.02%	534,452	5.47%
Total Polled	63,567	71.61%	1,031,464	77.72%	9,777,821	75.74%
Registered Electors	88,773		1,327,145		12,909,631	

=== 2001 Sri Lankan Parliamentary Election ===
Party	Negombo		Gampaha Electoral District		Sri Lanka	
Party	Votes	%	Votes	%	Votes	%
UNP	35,678	57.20%	437,289	43.94%	4,086,026	45.62%
PA	21,811	34.97%	428,780	43.08%	3,330,815	37.19%
JVP	4,141	6.64%	113,990	11.45%	815,353	9.10%
Other Parties (with < 1%)	743	1.19%	15,171	1.52%	137,826	1.54%
Valid Votes	62,373	95.35%	995,230	96.30%	8,955,844	94.77%
Rejected Votes	3,044	4.65%	38,187	3.70%	494,009	5.23%
Total Polled	65,417	76.26%	1,033,417	80.36%	9,449,878	76.03%
Registered Electors	85,784		1,285,973		12,428,762	

=== 2000 Sri Lankan Parliamentary Election ===
Party	Negombo		Gampaha Electoral District		Sri Lanka	
Party	Votes	%	Votes	%	Votes	%
UNP	28,983	47.92%	378,328	39.34%	3,451,765	40.12%
PA	24,826	41.05%	470,018	48.87%	3,899,329	45.33%
NUA	2,596	4.29%	11,013	1.15%	185,593	2.16%
JVP	2,557	4.23%	73,110	7.60%	518,725	6.03%
SU	975	1.61%	20,297	2.11%	127,859	1.49%
Other Parties (with < 1%)	545	0.90%	8,943	0.93%	133,530	1.55%
Valid Votes	60,482	N/A	961,709	N/A	8,602,617	N/A

=== 1994 Sri Lankan Parliamentary Election ===
Party	Negombo		Gampaha Electoral District		Sri Lanka	
Party	Votes	%	Votes	%	Votes	%
PA	28,830	49.93%	509,030	56.79%	3,887,805	48.94%
UNP	28,624	49.57%	375,631	41.91%	3,498,370	44.04%
Other Parties (with < 1%)	289	0.50%	11,627	1.30%	90,078	1.13%
Valid Votes	57,743	95.75%	896,288	96.39%	7,943,688	95.20%
Rejected Votes	2,566	4.25%	33,553	3.61%	400,395	4.80%
Total Polled	60,309	74.84%	929,841	79.65%	8,344,095	74.75%
Registered Electors	80,589		1,167,469		11,163,064	

=== 1989 Sri Lankan Parliamentary Election ===
Party	Negombo		Gampaha Electoral District		Sri Lanka	
Party	Votes	%	Votes	%	Votes	%
UNP	30,610	66.12%	385,733	54.14%	2,838,005	50.71%
SLFP	12,566	27.14%	294,490	41.34%	1,785,369	31.90%
USA	1,810	3.91%	21,665	3.04%	141,983	2.54%
ELJP	1,310	2.83%	10,549	1.48%	67,723	1.21%
Valid Votes	46,296	95.07%	712,437	95.64%	5,596,468	93.87%
Rejected Votes	2,403	4.93%	32,497	4.36%	365,563	6.13%
Total Polled	48,699	72.02%	744,934	76.82%	5,962,031	63.60%
Registered Electors	67,618		969,658		9,374,164	

== Demographics ==
=== Ethnicity ===
The Negombo Polling Division has a Sinhalese majority (75.5%) and a significant Moor population (13.8%) . In comparison, the Gampaha Electoral District (which contains the Negombo Polling Division) has a Sinhalese majority (90.5%)

Ethnicity in Negombo
1. Sinhalese (75.5%)
2. Moor (13.8%)
3. Sri Lankan Tamil (9.00%)
4. Other (1.70%)

=== Religion ===
The Negombo Polling Division has a Roman Catholic majority (65.3%), a significant Muslim population (14.3%) and a significant Buddhist population (11.1%) . In comparison, the Gampaha Electoral District (which contains the Negombo Polling Division) has a Buddhist majority (71.3%) and a significant Roman Catholic population (19.5%)

Religion in Negombo
1. Roman Catholic (65.3%)
2. Muslim (14.3%)
3. Buddhist (11.1%)
4. Hindu (5.90%)
5. Other Christian (3.30%)
6. Other (0.10%)
