= Deraniyagala Polling Division =

Deraniyagala
- Polling Division
- Interactive map of Deraniyagala
- Coordinates: 6.918035°N 80.342670°E
- Country: Sri Lanka
- Province: Sabaragamuwa Province, Sri Lanka
- Electoral District: Kegalle Electoral District

Area
  - Total: 429.19 km^{2} (165.71 sq mi)

Population (2012)
  - Total: 127,184
  - Density: 296/km^{2} (770/sq mi)
- ISO 3166 code: EC-22I

The Deraniyagala Polling Division is a Polling Division in the Kegalle Electoral District, in the Sabaragamuwa Province, Sri Lanka.

== Presidential Election Results ==
=== Summary ===
The winner of Deraniyagala has matched the final country result 7 out of 8 times.

Year	Deraniyagala	Kegalle Electoral District	MAE %	Sri Lanka	MAE %
2019	SLPP	SLPP	1.35%	SLPP	1.50%
2015	UPFA	UPFA	2.37%	NDF	6.57%
2010	UPFA	UPFA	0.36%	UPFA	4.00%
2005	UPFA	UPFA	1.05%	UPFA	0.31%
1999	PA	PA	3.10%	PA	3.15%
1994	PA	PA	5.99%	PA	12.16%
1988	UNP	UNP	3.03%	UNP	8.40%
1982	UNP	UNP	0.63%	UNP	3.71%
Matches/Mean MAE	7/8	7/8	2.23%	8/8	4.98%

=== 2019 Sri Lankan Presidential Election ===
Party	Deraniyagala		Kegalle Electoral District		Sri Lanka	
Party	Votes	%	Votes	%	Votes	%
SLPP	31,392	54.30%	320,484	55.66%	6,924,255	52.25%
NDF	23,733	41.05%	228,032	39.60%	5,564,239	41.99%
Other Parties (with < 1%)	1,570	2.72%	12,272	2.13%	345,452	2.61%
NMPP	1,116	1.93%	15,043	2.61%	418,553	3.16%
Valid Votes	57,811	99.19%	575,831	99.11%	13,252,499	98.99%
Rejected Votes	471	0.81%	5,152	0.89%	135,452	1.01%
Total Polled	58,282	86.44%	580,983	85.89%	13,387,951	83.71%
Registered Electors	67,424		676,440		15,992,568	

=== 2015 Sri Lankan Presidential Election ===
Party	Deraniyagala		Kegalle Electoral District		Sri Lanka	
Party	Votes	%	Votes	%	Votes	%
UPFA	28,741	54.05%	278,130	51.82%	5,768,090	47.58%
NDF	23,648	44.47%	252,533	47.05%	6,217,162	51.28%
Other Parties (with < 1%)	783	1.47%	6,108	1.14%	138,200	1.14%
Valid Votes	53,172	98.67%	536,771	98.80%	12,123,452	98.85%
Rejected Votes	717	1.33%	6,515	1.20%	140,925	1.15%
Total Polled	53,889	80.91%	543,286	79.85%	12,264,377	78.69%
Registered Electors	66,607		680,414		15,585,942	

=== 2010 Sri Lankan Presidential Election ===
Party	Deraniyagala		Kegalle Electoral District		Sri Lanka	
Party	Votes	%	Votes	%	Votes	%
UPFA	28,460	61.68%	296,639	61.80%	6,015,934	57.88%
NDF	16,461	35.67%	174,877	36.44%	4,173,185	40.15%
Other Parties (with < 1%)	1,224	2.65%	8,448	1.76%	204,494	1.97%
Valid Votes	46,145	99.14%	479,964	99.25%	10,393,613	99.03%
Rejected Votes	398	0.86%	3,604	0.75%	101,838	0.97%
Total Polled	46,543	75.67%	483,568	76.11%	10,495,451	66.70%
Registered Electors	61,507		635,342		15,734,587	

=== 2005 Sri Lankan Presidential Election ===
Party	Deraniyagala		Kegalle Electoral District		Sri Lanka	
Party	Votes	%	Votes	%	Votes	%
UPFA	22,653	49.71%	239,184	51.02%	4,887,152	50.29%
UNP	22,087	48.47%	223,483	47.67%	4,706,366	48.43%
Other Parties (with < 1%)	833	1.83%	6,106	1.30%	123,521	1.27%
Valid Votes	45,573	98.86%	468,773	98.99%	9,717,039	98.88%
Rejected Votes	526	1.14%	4,795	1.01%	109,869	1.12%
Total Polled	46,099	79.26%	473,568	78.68%	9,826,908	69.51%
Registered Electors	58,163		601,872		14,136,979	

=== 1999 Sri Lankan Presidential Election ===
Party	Deraniyagala		Kegalle Electoral District		Sri Lanka	
Party	Votes	%	Votes	%	Votes	%
PA	19,771	48.16%	210,185	51.30%	4,312,157	51.12%
UNP	19,062	46.43%	176,376	43.05%	3,602,748	42.71%
JVP	1,202	2.93%	14,997	3.66%	343,927	4.08%
Other Parties (with < 1%)	1,021	2.49%	8,122	1.98%	176,679	2.09%
Valid Votes	41,056	98.09%	409,680	98.05%	8,435,754	97.69%
Rejected Votes	801	1.91%	8,136	1.95%	199,536	2.31%
Total Polled	41,857	76.88%	417,816	76.52%	8,635,290	72.17%
Registered Electors	54,448		546,038		11,965,536	

=== 1994 Sri Lankan Presidential Election ===
Party	Deraniyagala		Kegalle Electoral District		Sri Lanka	
Party	Votes	%	Votes	%	Votes	%
PA	18,793	49.85%	211,676	56.06%	4,709,205	62.28%
UNP	18,179	48.22%	159,707	42.30%	2,715,283	35.91%
Other Parties (with < 1%)	728	1.93%	6,209	1.64%	137,040	1.81%
Valid Votes	37,700	97.63%	377,592	98.14%	7,561,526	98.03%
Rejected Votes	915	2.37%	7,139	1.86%	151,706	1.97%
Total Polled	38,615	73.25%	384,731	74.84%	7,713,232	69.12%
Registered Electors	52,714		514,055		11,158,880	

=== 1988 Sri Lankan Presidential Election ===
Party	Deraniyagala		Kegalle Electoral District		Sri Lanka	
Party	Votes	%	Votes	%	Votes	%
UNP	17,649	60.33%	168,720	57.11%	2,569,199	50.43%
SLFP	11,008	37.63%	119,769	40.54%	2,289,857	44.95%
SLMP	595	2.03%	6,923	2.34%	235,701	4.63%
Valid Votes	29,252	98.52%	295,412	98.57%	5,094,754	98.24%
Rejected Votes	438	1.48%	4,277	1.43%	91,499	1.76%
Total Polled	29,690	67.88%	299,689	67.98%	5,186,256	55.87%
Registered Electors	43,740		440,836		9,283,143	

=== 1982 Sri Lankan Presidential Election ===
Party	Deraniyagala		Kegalle Electoral District		Sri Lanka	
Party	Votes	%	Votes	%	Votes	%
UNP	19,249	57.33%	195,444	57.02%	3,450,815	52.93%
SLFP	11,997	35.73%	126,538	36.92%	2,546,348	39.05%
JVP	1,371	4.08%	13,706	4.00%	273,428	4.19%
LSSP	789	2.35%	6,184	1.80%	58,531	0.90%
Other Parties (with < 1%)	170	0.51%	890	0.26%	190,929	2.93%
Valid Votes	33,576	98.32%	342,762	98.69%	6,520,156	98.78%
Rejected Votes	572	1.68%	4,537	1.31%	80,470	1.22%
Total Polled	34,148	84.25%	347,299	84.30%	6,600,626	80.15%
Registered Electors	40,531		411,994		8,235,358	

== Parliamentary Election Results ==
=== Summary ===
The winner of Deraniyagala has matched the final country result 6 out of 7 times. Hence, Deraniyagala is a Strong Bellwether for Parliamentary Elections.

Year	Deraniyagala	Kegalle Electoral District	MAE %	Sri Lanka	MAE %
2015	UNP	UNP	0.55%	UNP	3.57%
2010	UPFA	UPFA	0.91%	UPFA	5.02%
2004	UPFA	UPFA	1.32%	UPFA	5.88%
2001	UNP	UNP	0.40%	UNP	3.36%
2000	PA	PA	1.40%	PA	3.64%
1994	UNP	UNP	7.49%	PA	10.69%
1989	UNP	UNP	2.66%	UNP	7.60%
Matches/Mean MAE	6/7	6/7	2.10%	7/7	5.68%

=== 2015 Sri Lankan Parliamentary Election ===
Party	Deraniyagala		Kegalle Electoral District		Sri Lanka	
Party	Votes	%	Votes	%	Votes	%
UNP	24,468	49.84%	247,467	49.52%	5,098,916	45.77%
UPFA	22,674	46.18%	227,208	45.47%	4,732,664	42.48%
JVP	1,049	2.14%	18,394	3.68%	544,154	4.88%
CWC	608	1.24%	2,448	0.49%	17,107	0.15%
Other Parties (with < 1%)	296	0.60%	4,213	0.84%	83,938	0.75%
Valid Votes	49,095	95.51%	499,730	96.35%	11,140,333	95.35%
Rejected Votes	2,286	4.45%	18,770	3.62%	516,926	4.42%
Total Polled	51,401	77.17%	518,674	79.81%	11,684,111	77.66%
Registered Electors	66,607		649,878		15,044,490	

=== 2010 Sri Lankan Parliamentary Election ===
Party	Deraniyagala		Kegalle Electoral District		Sri Lanka	
Party	Votes	%	Votes	%	Votes	%
UPFA	22,109	67.90%	242,463	66.89%	4,846,388	60.38%
UNP	9,204	28.27%	104,925	28.95%	2,357,057	29.37%
DNA	898	2.76%	13,518	3.73%	441,251	5.50%
Other Parties (with < 1%)	348	1.07%	1,549	0.43%	33,973	0.42%
Valid Votes	32,559	90.98%	362,455	93.32%	8,026,322	96.03%
Rejected Votes	3,229	9.02%	25,965	6.68%	581,465	6.96%
Total Polled	35,788	58.19%	388,420	60.93%	8,358,246	59.29%
Registered Electors	61,507		637,524		14,097,690	

=== 2004 Sri Lankan Parliamentary Election ===
Party	Deraniyagala		Kegalle Electoral District		Sri Lanka	
Party	Votes	%	Votes	%	Votes	%
UPFA	20,436	50.60%	214,267	50.88%	4,223,126	45.70%
UNP	18,881	46.75%	186,641	44.32%	3,486,792	37.73%
JHU	824	2.04%	18,034	4.28%	552,723	5.98%
Other Parties (with < 1%)	246	0.61%	2,187	0.52%	59,247	0.64%
Valid Votes	40,387	91.85%	421,134	94.25%	9,241,931	94.52%
Rejected Votes	3,584	8.15%	25,685	5.75%	534,452	5.47%
Total Polled	43,971	76.98%	446,816	78.35%	9,777,821	75.74%
Registered Electors	57,117		570,299		12,909,631	

=== 2001 Sri Lankan Parliamentary Election ===
Party	Deraniyagala		Kegalle Electoral District		Sri Lanka	
Party	Votes	%	Votes	%	Votes	%
UNP	20,383	49.99%	208,104	49.36%	4,086,026	45.62%
PA	16,528	40.53%	170,901	40.53%	3,330,815	37.19%
JVP	3,148	7.72%	36,711	8.71%	815,353	9.10%
Other Parties (with < 1%)	716	1.76%	5,924	1.40%	123,245	1.38%
Valid Votes	40,775	93.12%	421,640	94.90%	8,955,844	94.77%
Rejected Votes	3,014	6.88%	22,669	5.10%	494,009	5.23%
Total Polled	43,789	78.00%	444,309	80.10%	9,449,878	76.03%
Registered Electors	56,143		554,698		12,428,762	

=== 2000 Sri Lankan Parliamentary Election ===
Party	Deraniyagala		Kegalle Electoral District		Sri Lanka	
Party	Votes	%	Votes	%	Votes	%
PA	19,715	48.43%	201,114	48.88%	3,899,329	45.33%
UNP	18,443	45.31%	175,627	42.69%	3,451,765	40.12%
JVP	1,848	4.54%	22,028	5.35%	518,725	6.03%
Other Parties (with < 1%)	701	1.72%	12,643	3.07%	419,507	4.88%
Valid Votes	40,707	N/A	411,412	N/A	8,602,617	N/A

=== 1994 Sri Lankan Parliamentary Election ===
Party	Deraniyagala		Kegalle Electoral District		Sri Lanka	
Party	Votes	%	Votes	%	Votes	%
UNP	23,725	58.90%	203,938	51.24%	3,498,370	44.04%
PA	16,305	40.48%	190,689	47.91%	3,887,805	48.94%
Other Parties (with < 1%)	253	0.63%	3,383	0.85%	90,078	1.13%
Valid Votes	40,283	94.99%	398,010	95.89%	7,943,688	95.20%
Rejected Votes	2,125	5.01%	17,043	4.11%	400,395	4.80%
Total Polled	42,408	80.45%	415,053	80.78%	8,344,095	74.75%
Registered Electors	52,714		513,825		11,163,064	

=== 1989 Sri Lankan Parliamentary Election ===
Party	Deraniyagala		Kegalle Electoral District		Sri Lanka	
Party	Votes	%	Votes	%	Votes	%
UNP	15,959	64.31%	174,334	61.12%	2,838,005	50.71%
SLFP	7,421	29.90%	80,668	28.28%	1,785,369	31.90%
USA	1,101	4.44%	15,168	5.32%	141,983	2.54%
Other Parties (with < 1%)	335	1.35%	15,084	5.29%	158,203	2.83%
Valid Votes	24,816	92.55%	285,254	93.95%	5,596,468	93.87%
Rejected Votes	1,999	7.45%	18,362	6.05%	365,563	6.13%
Total Polled	26,815	62.03%	303,616	69.46%	5,962,031	63.60%
Registered Electors	43,230		437,131		9,374,164	

== Demographics ==
=== Ethnicity ===
The Deraniyagala Polling Division has a Sinhalese majority (79.8%) and a significant Indian Tamil population (13.3%) . In comparison, the Kegalle Electoral District (which contains the Deraniyagala Polling Division) has a Sinhalese majority (85.5%)

Ethnicity in Deraniyagala
1. Sinhalese (79.8%)
2. Indian Tamil (13.3%)
3. Sri Lankan Tamil (4.10%)
4. Moor (2.70%)
5. Other (0.10%)

=== Religion ===
The Deraniyagala Polling Division has a Buddhist majority (78.9%) and a significant Hindu population (15.7%) . In comparison, the Kegalle Electoral District (which contains the Deraniyagala Polling Division) has a Buddhist majority (84.4%)

Religion in Deraniyagala
1. Buddhist (78.9%)
2. Hindu (15.7%)
3. Muslim (2.80%)
4. Roman Catholic (1.90%)
5. Other (0.70%)
