= Badulla Polling Division =

Polling division in Sri Lanka

Badulla
- Polling Division
- Coordinates: 6.989235°N 81.087681°E
- Country: Sri Lanka
- Province: Uva Province, Sri Lanka
- Electoral District: Badulla Electoral District

Area
  - Total: 47.09 km^{2} (18.18 sq mi)

Population (2012)
  - Total: 75,042
  - Density: 1,594/km^{2} (4,130/sq mi)
- ISO 3166 code: EC-19D

The Badulla Polling Division is a Polling Division in the Badulla Electoral District, in the Uva Province, Sri Lanka.

== Presidential Election Results ==
=== Summary ===
The winner of Badulla has matched the final country result 7 out of 8 times. Hence, Badulla is a Bellwether for Presidential Elections.

Year	Badulla	Badulla Electoral District	MAE %	Sri Lanka	MAE %
2019	SLPP	SLPP	1.18%	SLPP	1.63%
2015	NDF	NDF	2.93%	NDF	1.14%
2010	UPFA	UPFA	1.83%	UPFA	6.27%
2005	UNP	UNP	2.37%	UPFA	2.44%
1999	PA	UNP	4.92%	PA	0.29%
1994	PA	PA	6.10%	PA	0.47%
1988	UNP	UNP	1.66%	UNP	7.43%
1982	UNP	UNP	1.92%	UNP	2.20%
Matches/Mean MAE	7/8	6/8	2.86%	8/8	2.73%

=== 2019 Sri Lankan Presidential Election ===
Party	Badulla		Badulla Electoral District		Sri Lanka	
Party	Votes	%	Votes	%	Votes	%
SLPP	23,029	50.49%	276,211	49.29%	6,924,255	52.25%
NDF	19,912	43.66%	251,706	44.92%	5,564,239	41.99%
NMPP	1,522	3.34%	14,806	2.64%	418,553	3.16%
Other Parties (with < 1%)	1,144	2.51%	17,622	3.14%	345,452	2.61%
Valid Votes	45,607	98.65%	560,345	98.77%	13,252,499	98.99%
Rejected Votes	623	1.35%	6,978	1.23%	135,452	1.01%
Total Polled	46,230	85.16%	567,323	86.25%	13,387,951	83.71%
Registered Electors	54,289		657,766		15,992,568	

=== 2015 Sri Lankan Presidential Election ===
Party	Badulla		Badulla Electoral District		Sri Lanka	
Party	Votes	%	Votes	%	Votes	%
NDF	22,659	52.41%	249,524	49.21%	6,217,162	51.28%
UPFA	20,062	46.40%	249,243	49.15%	5,768,090	47.58%
Other Parties (with < 1%)	513	1.19%	8,303	1.64%	138,200	1.14%
Valid Votes	43,234	98.56%	507,070	98.47%	12,123,452	98.85%
Rejected Votes	630	1.44%	7,871	1.53%	140,925	1.15%
Total Polled	43,864	79.49%	514,941	79.51%	12,264,377	78.69%
Registered Electors	55,185		647,628		15,585,942	

=== 2010 Sri Lankan Presidential Election ===
Party	Badulla		Badulla Electoral District		Sri Lanka	
Party	Votes	%	Votes	%	Votes	%
UPFA	19,799	51.57%	237,579	53.23%	6,015,934	57.88%
NDF	17,917	46.67%	198,835	44.55%	4,173,185	40.15%
Other Parties (with < 1%)	676	1.76%	9,880	2.21%	204,494	1.97%
Valid Votes	38,392	98.86%	446,294	98.66%	10,393,613	99.03%
Rejected Votes	441	1.14%	6,083	1.34%	101,838	0.97%
Total Polled	38,833	75.45%	452,377	75.62%	10,495,451	66.70%
Registered Electors	51,468		598,190		15,734,587	

=== 2005 Sri Lankan Presidential Election ===
Party	Badulla		Badulla Electoral District		Sri Lanka	
Party	Votes	%	Votes	%	Votes	%
UNP	18,624	50.85%	226,582	53.11%	4,706,366	48.43%
UPFA	17,494	47.77%	192,734	45.18%	4,887,152	50.29%
Other Parties (with < 1%)	505	1.38%	7,283	1.71%	123,521	1.27%
Valid Votes	36,623	98.62%	426,599	98.43%	9,717,039	98.88%
Rejected Votes	512	1.38%	6,825	1.57%	109,869	1.12%
Total Polled	37,135	76.30%	433,424	78.67%	9,826,908	69.51%
Registered Electors	48,670		550,926		14,136,979	

=== 1999 Sri Lankan Presidential Election ===
Party	Badulla		Badulla Electoral District		Sri Lanka	
Party	Votes	%	Votes	%	Votes	%
PA	16,039	51.58%	167,000	46.33%	4,312,157	51.12%
UNP	13,310	42.80%	172,884	47.97%	3,602,748	42.71%
JVP	1,125	3.62%	12,025	3.34%	343,927	4.08%
Other Parties (with < 1%)	624	2.01%	8,512	2.36%	176,679	2.09%
Valid Votes	31,098	97.24%	360,421	97.04%	8,435,754	97.69%
Rejected Votes	882	2.76%	10,979	2.96%	199,536	2.31%
Total Polled	31,980	75.09%	371,400	78.25%	8,635,290	72.17%
Registered Electors	42,591		474,610		11,965,536	

=== 1994 Sri Lankan Presidential Election ===
Party	Badulla		Badulla Electoral District		Sri Lanka	
Party	Votes	%	Votes	%	Votes	%
PA	17,416	61.66%	182,810	55.27%	4,709,205	62.28%
UNP	10,210	36.15%	139,611	42.21%	2,715,283	35.91%
Other Parties (with < 1%)	617	2.18%	8,351	2.52%	137,040	1.81%
Valid Votes	28,243	96.72%	330,772	95.91%	7,561,526	98.03%
Rejected Votes	958	3.28%	14,093	4.09%	151,706	1.97%
Total Polled	29,201	72.93%	344,865	77.47%	7,713,232	69.12%
Registered Electors	40,039		445,146		11,158,880	

=== 1988 Sri Lankan Presidential Election ===
Party	Badulla		Badulla Electoral District		Sri Lanka	
Party	Votes	%	Votes	%	Votes	%
UNP	4,968	57.82%	80,779	60.09%	2,569,199	50.43%
SLFP	3,160	36.78%	50,223	37.36%	2,289,857	44.95%
SLMP	464	5.40%	3,422	2.55%	235,701	4.63%
Valid Votes	8,592	97.89%	134,424	97.62%	5,094,754	98.24%
Rejected Votes	185	2.11%	3,276	2.38%	91,499	1.76%
Total Polled	8,777	27.49%	137,700	44.21%	5,186,256	55.87%
Registered Electors	31,924		311,473		9,283,143	

=== 1982 Sri Lankan Presidential Election ===
Party	Badulla		Badulla Electoral District		Sri Lanka	
Party	Votes	%	Votes	%	Votes	%
UNP	12,435	56.52%	141,062	58.67%	3,450,815	52.93%
SLFP	8,485	38.56%	88,462	36.79%	2,546,348	39.05%
JVP	717	3.26%	7,713	3.21%	273,428	4.19%
LSSP	253	1.15%	2,115	0.88%	58,531	0.90%
Other Parties (with < 1%)	113	0.51%	1,088	0.45%	190,929	2.93%
Valid Votes	22,003	98.97%	240,440	98.77%	6,520,156	98.78%
Rejected Votes	228	1.03%	2,982	1.23%	80,470	1.22%
Total Polled	22,231	81.08%	243,422	85.47%	6,600,626	80.15%
Registered Electors	27,419		284,801		8,235,358	

== Parliamentary Election Results ==
=== Summary ===
The winner of Badulla has matched the final country result 5 out of 7 times. Hence, Badulla is a Weak Bellwether for Parliamentary Elections.

Year	Badulla	Badulla Electoral District	MAE %	Sri Lanka	MAE %
2015	UNP	UNP	0.86%	UNP	6.84%
2010	UPFA	UPFA	1.30%	UPFA	3.32%
2004	UNP	UNP	1.44%	UPFA	4.28%
2001	UNP	UNP	2.81%	UNP	2.31%
2000	PA	UNP	3.61%	PA	1.52%
1994	UNP	UNP	5.03%	PA	2.30%
1989	UNP	UNP	4.08%	UNP	2.10%
Matches/Mean MAE	5/7	4/7	2.73%	7/7	3.24%

=== 2015 Sri Lankan Parliamentary Election ===
Party	Badulla		Badulla Electoral District		Sri Lanka	
Party	Votes	%	Votes	%	Votes	%
UNP	22,526	55.63%	258,844	54.82%	5,098,916	45.77%
UPFA	15,023	37.10%	179,459	38.01%	4,732,664	42.48%
JVP	2,251	5.56%	21,445	4.54%	544,154	4.88%
Other Parties (with < 1%)	690	1.70%	12,418	2.63%	94,052	0.84%
Valid Votes	40,490	96.30%	472,166	95.03%	11,140,333	95.35%
Rejected Votes	1,522	3.62%	24,167	4.86%	516,926	4.42%
Total Polled	42,044	76.19%	496,849	80.07%	11,684,111	77.66%
Registered Electors	55,185		620,486		15,044,490	

=== 2010 Sri Lankan Parliamentary Election ===
Party	Badulla		Badulla Electoral District		Sri Lanka	
Party	Votes	%	Votes	%	Votes	%
UPFA	18,670	57.63%	203,689	58.25%	4,846,388	60.38%
UNP	11,314	34.92%	112,886	32.28%	2,357,057	29.37%
DNA	1,655	5.11%	15,768	4.51%	441,251	5.50%
UPF	598	1.85%	11,481	3.28%	24,670	0.31%
Other Parties (with < 1%)	161	0.50%	5,854	1.67%	28,670	0.36%
Valid Votes	32,398	95.83%	349,678	93.54%	8,026,322	96.03%
Rejected Votes	1,409	4.17%	24,169	6.46%	581,465	6.96%
Total Polled	33,807	65.69%	373,847	62.46%	8,358,246	59.29%
Registered Electors	51,468		598,521		14,097,690	

=== 2004 Sri Lankan Parliamentary Election ===
Party	Badulla		Badulla Electoral District		Sri Lanka	
Party	Votes	%	Votes	%	Votes	%
UNP	15,825	48.35%	181,705	49.09%	3,486,792	37.73%
UPFA	15,103	46.14%	178,634	48.26%	4,223,126	45.70%
JHU	1,586	4.85%	6,932	1.87%	552,723	5.98%
Other Parties (with < 1%)	217	0.66%	2,907	0.79%	57,589	0.62%
Valid Votes	32,731	94.30%	370,178	92.47%	9,241,931	94.52%
Rejected Votes	1,980	5.70%	30,159	7.53%	534,452	5.47%
Total Polled	34,711	74.05%	400,337	78.33%	9,777,821	75.74%
Registered Electors	46,872		511,115		12,909,631	

=== 2001 Sri Lankan Parliamentary Election ===
Party	Badulla		Badulla Electoral District		Sri Lanka	
Party	Votes	%	Votes	%	Votes	%
UNP	16,240	49.70%	201,173	53.81%	4,086,026	45.62%
PA	12,518	38.31%	138,443	37.03%	3,330,815	37.19%
JVP	2,851	8.72%	26,820	7.17%	815,353	9.10%
IND3	817	2.50%	5,065	1.35%	6,161	0.07%
Other Parties (with < 1%)	251	0.77%	2,336	0.62%	73,230	0.82%
Valid Votes	32,677	94.55%	373,837	93.35%	8,955,844	94.77%
Rejected Votes	1,884	5.45%	26,626	6.65%	494,009	5.23%
Total Polled	34,561	75.89%	400,463	81.51%	9,449,878	76.03%
Registered Electors	45,540		491,288		12,428,762	

=== 2000 Sri Lankan Parliamentary Election ===
Party	Badulla		Badulla Electoral District		Sri Lanka	
Party	Votes	%	Votes	%	Votes	%
PA	14,638	46.58%	154,172	42.71%	3,899,329	45.33%
UNP	13,312	42.36%	167,351	46.36%	3,451,765	40.12%
JVP	1,778	5.66%	16,414	4.55%	518,725	6.03%
Other Parties (with < 1%)	637	2.03%	5,935	1.64%	245,839	2.86%
CWC	631	2.01%	12,092	3.35%	22,985	0.27%
NUA	430	1.37%	5,052	1.40%	185,593	2.16%
Valid Votes	31,426	N/A	361,016	N/A	8,602,617	N/A

=== 1994 Sri Lankan Parliamentary Election ===
Party	Badulla		Badulla Electoral District		Sri Lanka	
Party	Votes	%	Votes	%	Votes	%
UNP	14,147	48.85%	182,131	54.04%	3,498,370	44.04%
PA	14,070	48.58%	146,546	43.48%	3,887,805	48.94%
Other Parties (with < 1%)	404	1.39%	4,827	1.43%	133,427	1.68%
SLPF	340	1.17%	3,555	1.05%	90,078	1.13%
Valid Votes	28,961	93.73%	337,059	92.19%	7,943,688	95.20%
Rejected Votes	1,937	6.27%	28,540	7.81%	400,395	4.80%
Total Polled	30,898	77.17%	365,599	82.23%	8,344,095	74.75%
Registered Electors	40,039		444,632		11,163,064	

=== 1989 Sri Lankan Parliamentary Election ===
Party	Badulla		Badulla Electoral District		Sri Lanka	
Party	Votes	%	Votes	%	Votes	%
UNP	10,874	52.74%	135,089	58.97%	2,838,005	50.71%
SLFP	7,154	34.70%	81,011	35.36%	1,785,369	31.90%
USA	1,704	8.26%	5,712	2.49%	141,983	2.54%
ELJP	716	3.47%	5,589	2.44%	67,723	1.21%
Other Parties (with < 1%)	171	0.83%	1,693	0.74%	90,480	1.62%
Valid Votes	20,619	93.81%	229,094	92.08%	5,596,468	93.87%
Rejected Votes	1,360	6.19%	19,704	7.92%	365,563	6.13%
Total Polled	21,979	70.94%	248,798	75.55%	5,962,031	63.60%
Registered Electors	30,982		329,321		9,374,164	

== Demographics ==
=== Ethnicity ===
The Badulla Polling Division has a Sinhalese majority (70.0%) and a significant Indian Tamil population (14.6%) . In comparison, the Badulla Electoral District (which contains the Badulla Polling Division) has a Sinhalese majority (73.0%) and a significant Indian Tamil population (18.5%)

Ethnicity in Badulla
1. Sinhalese (70.0%)
2. Indian Tamil (14.6%)
3. Moor (9.40%)
4. Sri Lankan Tamil (5.00%)
5. Other (1.00%)

=== Religion ===
The Badulla Polling Division has a Buddhist majority (68.8%), a significant Hindu population (18.0%) and a significant Muslim population (10.3%) . In comparison, the Badulla Electoral District (which contains the Badulla Polling Division) has a Buddhist majority (72.6%) and a significant Hindu population (19.3%)

Religion in Badulla
1. Buddhist (68.8%)
2. Hindu (18.0%)
3. Muslim (10.3%)
4. Roman Catholic (1.70%)
5. Other Christian (1.10%)
6. Other (0.00%)
