= Wattala Polling Division =

Wattala
- Polling Division
- Coordinates: 7.024564°N 79.891942°E
- Country: Sri Lanka
- Province: Western Province, Sri Lanka
- Electoral District: Gampaha Electoral District

Area
  - Total: 57.4 km^{2} (22.2 sq mi)

Population (2012)
  - Total: 175,525
  - Density: 3,058/km^{2} (7,920/sq mi)
- ISO 3166 code: EC-02A

The Wattala Polling Division is a Polling Division in the Gampaha Electoral District, in the Western Province, Sri Lanka.

== Presidential Election Results ==
=== Summary ===
The winner of Wattala has matched the final country result 6 out of 8 times. Hence, Wattala is a Weak Bellwether for Presidential Elections.

Year	Wattala	Gampaha Electoral District	MAE %	Sri Lanka	MAE %
2019	NDF	SLPP	12.22%	SLPP	5.41%
2015	NDF	NDF	9.49%	NDF	7.79%
2010	UPFA	UPFA	11.76%	UPFA	8.31%
2005	UNP	UPFA	11.68%	UPFA	7.35%
1999	PA	PA	7.18%	PA	2.23%
1994	PA	PA	4.21%	PA	1.96%
1988	UNP	SLFP	8.84%	UNP	5.76%
1982	UNP	UNP	9.59%	UNP	7.43%
Matches/Mean MAE	6/8	7/8	9.37%	8/8	5.78%

=== 2019 Sri Lankan Presidential Election ===
Party	Wattala		Gampaha Electoral District		Sri Lanka	
Party	Votes	%	Votes	%	Votes	%
NDF	49,463	47.72%	494,671	34.26%	5,564,239	41.99%
SLPP	48,214	46.51%	855,870	59.28%	6,924,255	52.25%
NMPP	3,428	3.31%	61,760	4.28%	418,553	3.16%
Other Parties (with < 1%)	2,557	2.47%	31,499	2.18%	345,452	2.61%
Valid Votes	103,662	98.65%	1,443,800	98.92%	13,252,499	98.99%
Rejected Votes	1,418	1.35%	15,751	1.08%	135,452	1.01%
Total Polled	105,080	80.89%	1,459,551	83.31%	13,387,951	83.71%
Registered Electors	129,912		1,751,892		15,992,568	

=== 2015 Sri Lankan Presidential Election ===
Party	Wattala		Gampaha Electoral District		Sri Lanka	
Party	Votes	%	Votes	%	Votes	%
NDF	56,541	59.32%	669,007	49.83%	6,217,162	51.28%
UPFA	38,001	39.87%	664,347	49.49%	5,768,090	47.58%
Other Parties (with < 1%)	769	0.81%	9,142	0.68%	138,200	1.14%
Valid Votes	95,311	98.62%	1,342,496	98.92%	12,123,452	98.85%
Rejected Votes	1,332	1.38%	14,647	1.08%	140,925	1.15%
Total Polled	96,643	80.22%	1,357,143	80.77%	12,264,377	78.69%
Registered Electors	120,471		1,680,263		15,585,942	

=== 2010 Sri Lankan Presidential Election ===
Party	Wattala		Gampaha Electoral District		Sri Lanka	
Party	Votes	%	Votes	%	Votes	%
UPFA	39,316	49.67%	718,716	61.66%	6,015,934	57.88%
NDF	38,789	49.00%	434,506	37.28%	4,173,185	40.15%
Other Parties (with < 1%)	1,055	1.33%	12,426	1.07%	204,494	1.97%
Valid Votes	79,160	98.96%	1,165,648	99.24%	10,393,613	99.03%
Rejected Votes	830	1.04%	8,960	0.76%	101,838	0.97%
Total Polled	79,990	76.99%	1,174,608	78.03%	10,495,451	66.70%
Registered Electors	103,893		1,505,363		15,734,587	

=== 2005 Sri Lankan Presidential Election ===
Party	Wattala		Gampaha Electoral District		Sri Lanka	
Party	Votes	%	Votes	%	Votes	%
UNP	40,984	56.03%	481,764	44.23%	4,706,366	48.43%
UPFA	31,446	42.99%	596,698	54.78%	4,887,152	50.29%
Other Parties (with < 1%)	718	0.98%	10,815	0.99%	123,521	1.27%
Valid Votes	73,148	98.82%	1,089,277	98.94%	9,717,039	98.88%
Rejected Votes	873	1.18%	11,724	1.06%	109,869	1.12%
Total Polled	74,021	78.37%	1,101,001	79.17%	9,826,908	69.51%
Registered Electors	94,455		1,390,691		14,136,979	

=== 1999 Sri Lankan Presidential Election ===
Party	Wattala		Gampaha Electoral District		Sri Lanka	
Party	Votes	%	Votes	%	Votes	%
PA	32,954	49.55%	532,796	56.58%	4,312,157	51.12%
UNP	30,566	45.96%	353,969	37.59%	3,602,748	42.71%
JVP	2,127	3.20%	40,472	4.30%	343,927	4.08%
Other Parties (with < 1%)	865	1.30%	14,382	1.53%	176,679	2.09%
Valid Votes	66,512	97.74%	941,619	97.84%	8,435,754	97.69%
Rejected Votes	1,541	2.26%	20,768	2.16%	199,536	2.31%
Total Polled	68,053	77.00%	962,387	77.12%	8,635,290	72.17%
Registered Electors	88,377		1,247,860		11,965,536	

=== 1994 Sri Lankan Presidential Election ===
Party	Wattala		Gampaha Electoral District		Sri Lanka	
Party	Votes	%	Votes	%	Votes	%
PA	37,373	60.55%	550,654	64.74%	4,709,205	62.28%
UNP	23,671	38.35%	288,608	33.93%	2,715,283	35.91%
Other Parties (with < 1%)	676	1.10%	11,256	1.32%	137,040	1.81%
Valid Votes	61,720	98.53%	850,518	98.48%	7,561,526	98.03%
Rejected Votes	922	1.47%	13,137	1.52%	151,706	1.97%
Total Polled	62,642	73.25%	863,655	74.16%	7,713,232	69.12%
Registered Electors	85,516		1,164,625		11,158,880	

=== 1988 Sri Lankan Presidential Election ===
Party	Wattala		Gampaha Electoral District		Sri Lanka	
Party	Votes	%	Votes	%	Votes	%
UNP	27,945	56.79%	350,092	48.08%	2,569,199	50.43%
SLFP	19,361	39.35%	355,553	48.83%	2,289,857	44.95%
SLMP	1,901	3.86%	22,467	3.09%	235,701	4.63%
Valid Votes	49,207	98.66%	728,112	98.63%	5,094,754	98.24%
Rejected Votes	666	1.34%	10,108	1.37%	91,499	1.76%
Total Polled	49,873	72.83%	738,220	74.93%	5,186,256	55.87%
Registered Electors	68,477		985,206		9,283,143	

=== 1982 Sri Lankan Presidential Election ===
Party	Wattala		Gampaha Electoral District		Sri Lanka	
Party	Votes	%	Votes	%	Votes	%
UNP	29,387	62.64%	365,847	52.50%	3,450,815	52.93%
SLFP	15,717	33.50%	301,808	43.31%	2,546,348	39.05%
JVP	1,402	2.99%	23,701	3.40%	273,428	4.19%
Other Parties (with < 1%)	410	0.87%	5,491	0.79%	249,460	3.83%
Valid Votes	46,916	99.10%	696,847	99.15%	6,520,156	98.78%
Rejected Votes	425	0.90%	5,992	0.85%	80,470	1.22%
Total Polled	47,341	81.60%	702,839	82.70%	6,600,626	80.15%
Registered Electors	58,015		849,896		8,235,358	

== Parliamentary Election Results ==
=== Summary ===
The winner of Wattala has matched the final country result 5 out of 7 times. Hence, Wattala is a Weak Bellwether for Parliamentary Elections.

Year	Wattala	Gampaha Electoral District	MAE %	Sri Lanka	MAE %
2015	UNP	UNP	9.77%	UNP	8.91%
2010	UPFA	UPFA	12.62%	UPFA	10.37%
2004	UNP	UPFA	10.25%	UPFA	6.53%
2001	UNP	UNP	7.92%	UNP	4.48%
2000	UNP	PA	6.52%	PA	4.38%
1994	PA	PA	6.69%	PA	2.75%
1989	UNP	UNP	5.29%	UNP	5.54%
Matches/Mean MAE	5/7	7/7	8.44%	7/7	6.14%

=== 2020 Sri Lankan Parliamentary Election ===
Party	Wattala		Gampaha Electoral District		Sri Lanka	
Party	Votes	%	Votes	%	Votes	%
SLPFA	47,230	52.48%	807,896	65.76%	6,853,693	59.09%
SJB	34,706	38.56%	285,809	23.27%	2,771,984	23.9%
JJB	3,744	4.16%	61,833	5.03%	445,958	3.84%
UNP	2,138	2.38%	28,282	2.3%	249,435	2.15%
Other Parties (with < 1%)	2,185	2.42%	44,654	3.64%	1,227,859	11.02%
Valid Votes	90,003	67.62%	1,228,474	68.78%	11,598,936	71.32%
Rejected Votes	6,673	5.01%	75,509	4.23%	744,373	4.58%
Total Polled	96,676	72.63%	1,303,983	73.01%	12,343,309	75.89%
Registered Electors	133,103		1,785,964		16,263,885	

=== 2015 Sri Lankan Parliamentary Election ===
Party	Wattala		Gampaha Electoral District		Sri Lanka	
Party	Votes	%	Votes	%	Votes	%
UNP	51,011	58.35%	577,004	47.17%	5,098,916	45.77%
UPFA	30,743	35.16%	549,958	44.96%	4,732,664	42.48%
JVP	5,141	5.88%	87,880	7.18%	544,154	4.88%
Other Parties (with < 1%)	532	0.61%	8,332	0.68%	81,501	0.73%
Valid Votes	87,427	95.12%	1,223,174	95.51%	11,140,333	95.35%
Rejected Votes	4,392	4.78%	56,246	4.39%	516,926	4.42%
Total Polled	91,910	76.29%	1,280,647	78.21%	11,684,111	77.66%
Registered Electors	120,471		1,637,537		15,044,490	

=== 2010 Sri Lankan Parliamentary Election ===
Party	Wattala		Gampaha Electoral District		Sri Lanka	
Party	Votes	%	Votes	%	Votes	%
UPFA	31,444	49.58%	589,476	63.40%	4,846,388	60.38%
UNP	26,659	42.03%	266,523	28.67%	2,357,057	29.37%
DNA	4,929	7.77%	69,747	7.50%	441,251	5.50%
Other Parties (with < 1%)	393	0.62%	3,985	0.43%	19,003	0.24%
Valid Votes	63,425	93.57%	929,731	94.83%	8,026,322	96.03%
Rejected Votes	4,328	6.38%	50,234	5.12%	581,465	6.96%
Total Polled	67,784	65.24%	980,467	65.06%	8,358,246	59.29%
Registered Electors	103,893		1,506,969		14,097,690	

=== 2004 Sri Lankan Parliamentary Election ===
Party	Wattala		Gampaha Electoral District		Sri Lanka	
Party	Votes	%	Votes	%	Votes	%
UNP	34,041	50.19%	367,572	37.14%	3,486,792	37.73%
UPFA	28,344	41.79%	509,963	51.52%	4,223,126	45.70%
JHU	4,525	6.67%	102,516	10.36%	552,723	5.98%
Other Parties (with < 1%)	911	1.34%	9,691	0.98%	57,229	0.62%
Valid Votes	67,821	96.07%	989,742	95.96%	9,241,931	94.52%
Rejected Votes	2,761	3.91%	41,462	4.02%	534,452	5.47%
Total Polled	70,598	76.81%	1,031,464	77.72%	9,777,821	75.74%
Registered Electors	91,912		1,327,145		12,909,631	

=== 2001 Sri Lankan Parliamentary Election ===
Party	Wattala		Gampaha Electoral District		Sri Lanka	
Party	Votes	%	Votes	%	Votes	%
UNP	37,592	53.82%	437,289	43.94%	4,086,026	45.62%
PA	24,651	35.29%	428,780	43.08%	3,330,815	37.19%
JVP	6,641	9.51%	113,990	11.45%	815,353	9.10%
Other Parties (with < 1%)	965	1.38%	15,171	1.52%	137,826	1.54%
Valid Votes	69,849	96.16%	995,230	96.30%	8,955,844	94.77%
Rejected Votes	2,791	3.84%	38,187	3.70%	494,009	5.23%
Total Polled	72,640	78.82%	1,033,417	80.36%	9,449,878	76.03%
Registered Electors	92,154		1,285,973		12,428,762	

=== 2000 Sri Lankan Parliamentary Election ===
Party	Wattala		Gampaha Electoral District		Sri Lanka	
Party	Votes	%	Votes	%	Votes	%
UNP	32,570	48.04%	378,328	39.34%	3,451,765	40.12%
PA	29,015	42.79%	470,018	48.87%	3,899,329	45.33%
JVP	4,146	6.11%	73,110	7.60%	518,725	6.03%
SU	1,320	1.95%	20,297	2.11%	127,859	1.49%
Other Parties (with < 1%)	752	1.11%	19,956	2.08%	319,123	3.71%
Valid Votes	67,803	N/A	961,709	N/A	8,602,617	N/A

=== 1994 Sri Lankan Parliamentary Election ===
Party	Wattala		Gampaha Electoral District		Sri Lanka	
Party	Votes	%	Votes	%	Votes	%
PA	32,311	50.18%	509,030	56.79%	3,887,805	48.94%
UNP	31,482	48.90%	375,631	41.91%	3,498,370	44.04%
Other Parties (with < 1%)	593	0.92%	11,627	1.30%	90,078	1.13%
Valid Votes	64,386	96.08%	896,288	96.39%	7,943,688	95.20%
Rejected Votes	2,627	3.92%	33,553	3.61%	400,395	4.80%
Total Polled	67,013	78.36%	929,841	79.65%	8,344,095	74.75%
Registered Electors	85,516		1,167,469		11,163,064	

=== 1989 Sri Lankan Parliamentary Election ===
Party	Wattala		Gampaha Electoral District		Sri Lanka	
Party	Votes	%	Votes	%	Votes	%
UNP	28,841	59.33%	385,733	54.14%	2,838,005	50.71%
SLFP	17,229	35.44%	294,490	41.34%	1,785,369	31.90%
USA	2,029	4.17%	21,665	3.04%	141,983	2.54%
ELJP	512	1.05%	10,549	1.48%	67,723	1.21%
Valid Votes	48,611	95.67%	712,437	95.64%	5,596,468	93.87%
Rejected Votes	2,200	4.33%	32,497	4.36%	365,563	6.13%
Total Polled	50,811	75.16%	744,934	76.82%	5,962,031	63.60%
Registered Electors	67,601		969,658		9,374,164	

== Demographics ==
=== Ethnicity ===
The Wattala Polling Division has a Sinhalese majority (71.1%) and a significant Sri Lankan Tamil population (18.8%) . In comparison, the Gampaha Electoral District (which contains the Wattala Polling Division) has a Sinhalese majority (90.5%)

Ethnicity in Wattala
1. Sinhalese (71.1%)
2. Sri Lankan Tamil (18.8%)
3. Moor (5.70%)
4. Indian Tamil (1.90%)
5. Burgher (1.50%)
6. Other (1.00%)

=== Religion ===
The Wattala Polling Division has a Roman Catholic plurality (45.2%), a significant Buddhist population (29.9%) and a significant Hindu population (13.0%) . In comparison, the Gampaha Electoral District (which contains the Wattala Polling Division) has a Buddhist majority (71.3%) and a significant Roman Catholic population (19.5%)

Religion in Wattala
1. Roman Catholic (45.2%)
2. Buddhist (29.9%)
3. Hindu (13.0%)
4. Muslim (6.50%)
5. Other Christian (5.40%)
6. Other (0.10%)
