= Bandarawela Polling Division =

Bandarawela
- Polling Division
- Coordinates: 6.848073°N 81.027679°E
- Country: Sri Lanka
- Province: Uva Province, Sri Lanka
- Electoral District: Badulla Electoral District

Area
  - Total: 171.39 km^{2} (66.17 sq mi)

Population (2012)
  - Total: 110,683
  - Density: 646/km^{2} (1,670/sq mi)
- ISO 3166 code: EC-19H

The Bandarawela Polling Division is a Polling Division in the Badulla Electoral District, in the Uva Province, Sri Lanka.

== Presidential Election Results ==
=== Summary ===
The winner of Bandarawela has matched the final country result 7 out of 8 times. Hence, Bandarawela is a bellwether for presidential elections.

Year	Bandarawela	Badulla Electoral District	MAE %	Sri Lanka	MAE %
2019	SLPP	SLPP	0.54%	SLPP	3.32%
2015	NDF	NDF	1.10%	NDF	0.70%
2010	UPFA	UPFA	0.92%	UPFA	5.38%
2005	UNP	UNP	0.47%	UPFA	5.32%
1999	PA	UNP	3.06%	PA	1.68%
1994	PA	PA	4.15%	PA	2.45%
1988	UNP	UNP	5.53%	UNP	2.99%
1982	UNP	UNP	5.58%	UNP	1.94%
Matches/Mean MAE	7/8	6/8	2.67%	8/8	2.97%

=== 2019 Sri Lankan Presidential Election ===
Party	Bandarawela		Badulla Electoral District		Sri Lanka	
Party	Votes	%	Votes	%	Votes	%
SLPP	34,528	48.79%	276,211	49.29%	6,924,255	52.25%
NDF	32,242	45.56%	251,706	44.92%	5,564,239	41.99%
Other Parties (with < 1%)	2,089	2.95%	17,622	3.14%	345,452	2.61%
NMPP	1,915	2.71%	14,806	2.64%	418,553	3.16%
Valid Votes	70,774	98.92%	560,345	98.77%	13,252,499	98.99%
Rejected Votes	770	1.08%	6,978	1.23%	135,452	1.01%
Total Polled	71,544	85.48%	567,323	86.25%	13,387,951	83.71%
Registered Electors	83,693		657,766		15,992,568	

=== 2015 Sri Lankan Presidential Election ===
Party	Bandarawela		Badulla Electoral District		Sri Lanka	
Party	Votes	%	Votes	%	Votes	%
NDF	32,766	50.42%	249,524	49.21%	6,217,162	51.28%
UPFA	31,272	48.12%	249,243	49.15%	5,768,090	47.58%
Other Parties (with < 1%)	943	1.45%	8,303	1.64%	138,200	1.14%
Valid Votes	64,981	98.54%	507,070	98.47%	12,123,452	98.85%
Rejected Votes	966	1.46%	7,871	1.53%	140,925	1.15%
Total Polled	65,947	79.31%	514,941	79.51%	12,264,377	78.69%
Registered Electors	83,147		647,628		15,585,942	

=== 2010 Sri Lankan Presidential Election ===
Party	Bandarawela		Badulla Electoral District		Sri Lanka	
Party	Votes	%	Votes	%	Votes	%
UPFA	29,975	52.30%	237,579	53.23%	6,015,934	57.88%
NDF	26,085	45.51%	198,835	44.55%	4,173,185	40.15%
Other Parties (with < 1%)	1,251	2.18%	9,880	2.21%	204,494	1.97%
Valid Votes	57,311	98.73%	446,294	98.66%	10,393,613	99.03%
Rejected Votes	735	1.27%	6,083	1.34%	101,838	0.97%
Total Polled	58,046	75.08%	452,377	75.62%	10,495,451	66.70%
Registered Electors	77,312		598,190		15,734,587	

=== 2005 Sri Lankan Presidential Election ===
Party	Bandarawela		Badulla Electoral District		Sri Lanka	
Party	Votes	%	Votes	%	Votes	%
UNP	29,137	53.57%	226,582	53.11%	4,706,366	48.43%
UPFA	24,294	44.66%	192,734	45.18%	4,887,152	50.29%
Other Parties (with < 1%)	962	1.77%	7,283	1.71%	123,521	1.27%
Valid Votes	54,393	98.39%	426,599	98.43%	9,717,039	98.88%
Rejected Votes	888	1.61%	6,825	1.57%	109,869	1.12%
Total Polled	55,281	77.54%	433,424	78.67%	9,826,908	69.51%
Registered Electors	71,292		550,926		14,136,979	

=== 1999 Sri Lankan Presidential Election ===
Party	Bandarawela		Badulla Electoral District		Sri Lanka	
Party	Votes	%	Votes	%	Votes	%
PA	23,002	49.85%	167,000	46.33%	4,312,157	51.12%
UNP	20,768	45.01%	172,884	47.97%	3,602,748	42.71%
JVP	1,339	2.90%	12,025	3.34%	343,927	4.08%
Other Parties (with < 1%)	1,031	2.23%	8,512	2.36%	176,679	2.09%
Valid Votes	46,140	96.80%	360,421	97.04%	8,435,754	97.69%
Rejected Votes	1,526	3.20%	10,979	2.96%	199,536	2.31%
Total Polled	47,666	76.79%	371,400	78.25%	8,635,290	72.17%
Registered Electors	62,074		474,610		11,965,536	

=== 1994 Sri Lankan Presidential Election ===
Party	Bandarawela		Badulla Electoral District		Sri Lanka	
Party	Votes	%	Votes	%	Votes	%
PA	23,648	59.52%	182,810	55.27%	4,709,205	62.28%
UNP	15,072	37.93%	139,611	42.21%	2,715,283	35.91%
Other Parties (with < 1%)	549	1.38%	4,504	1.36%	78,152	1.03%
Ind 2	464	1.17%	3,847	1.16%	58,888	0.78%
Valid Votes	39,733	95.20%	330,772	95.91%	7,561,526	98.03%
Rejected Votes	2,003	4.80%	14,093	4.09%	151,706	1.97%
Total Polled	41,736	73.97%	344,865	77.47%	7,713,232	69.12%
Registered Electors	56,426		445,146		11,158,880	

=== 1988 Sri Lankan Presidential Election ===
Party	Bandarawela		Badulla Electoral District		Sri Lanka	
Party	Votes	%	Votes	%	Votes	%
UNP	14,191	54.27%	80,779	60.09%	2,569,199	50.43%
SLFP	11,182	42.76%	50,223	37.36%	2,289,857	44.95%
SLMP	776	2.97%	3,422	2.55%	235,701	4.63%
Valid Votes	26,149	97.33%	134,424	97.62%	5,094,754	98.24%
Rejected Votes	717	2.67%	3,276	2.38%	91,499	1.76%
Total Polled	26,866	63.26%	137,700	44.21%	5,186,256	55.87%
Registered Electors	42,467		311,473		9,283,143	

=== 1982 Sri Lankan Presidential Election ===
Party	Bandarawela		Badulla Electoral District		Sri Lanka	
Party	Votes	%	Votes	%	Votes	%
UNP	15,718	53.24%	141,062	58.67%	3,450,815	52.93%
SLFP	12,755	43.21%	88,462	36.79%	2,546,348	39.05%
JVP	652	2.21%	7,713	3.21%	273,428	4.19%
Other Parties (with < 1%)	397	1.34%	3,203	1.33%	249,460	3.83%
Valid Votes	29,522	98.75%	240,440	98.77%	6,520,156	98.78%
Rejected Votes	375	1.25%	2,982	1.23%	80,470	1.22%
Total Polled	29,897	84.05%	243,422	85.47%	6,600,626	80.15%
Registered Electors	35,570		284,801		8,235,358	

== Parliamentary Election Results ==
=== Summary ===
The winner of Bandarawela has matched the final country result 4 out of 7 times. Hence, Bandarawela is a Weak Bellwether for Parliamentary Elections.

Year	Bandarawela	Badulla Electoral District	MAE %	Sri Lanka	MAE %
2015	UNP	UNP	0.28%	UNP	6.34%
2010	UPFA	UPFA	2.28%	UPFA	4.37%
2004	UNP	UNP	1.67%	UPFA	5.05%
2001	UNP	UNP	0.06%	UNP	4.01%
2000	UNP	UNP	0.65%	PA	3.30%
1994	UNP	UNP	2.67%	PA	4.56%
1989	UNP	UNP	4.45%	UNP	4.70%
Matches/Mean MAE	4/7	4/7	1.72%	7/7	4.62%

=== 2015 Sri Lankan Parliamentary Election ===
Party	Bandarawela		Badulla Electoral District		Sri Lanka	
Party	Votes	%	Votes	%	Votes	%
UNP	33,115	54.97%	258,844	54.82%	5,098,916	45.77%
UPFA	22,618	37.55%	179,459	38.01%	4,732,664	42.48%
JVP	2,642	4.39%	21,445	4.54%	544,154	4.88%
CWC	1,650	2.74%	10,259	2.17%	17,107	0.15%
Other Parties (with < 1%)	212	0.35%	2,159	0.46%	76,945	0.69%
Valid Votes	60,237	95.26%	472,166	95.03%	11,140,333	95.35%
Rejected Votes	2,924	4.62%	24,167	4.86%	516,926	4.42%
Total Polled	63,231	76.05%	496,849	80.07%	11,684,111	77.66%
Registered Electors	83,147		620,486		15,044,490	

=== 2010 Sri Lankan Parliamentary Election ===
Party	Bandarawela		Badulla Electoral District		Sri Lanka	
Party	Votes	%	Votes	%	Votes	%
UPFA	24,188	55.40%	203,689	58.25%	4,846,388	60.38%
UNP	14,803	33.90%	112,886	32.28%	2,357,057	29.37%
DNA	2,262	5.18%	15,768	4.51%	441,251	5.50%
UPF	2,145	4.91%	11,481	3.28%	24,670	0.31%
Other Parties (with < 1%)	264	0.60%	5,854	1.67%	28,670	0.36%
Valid Votes	43,662	93.61%	349,678	93.54%	8,026,322	96.03%
Rejected Votes	2,982	6.39%	24,169	6.46%	581,465	6.96%
Total Polled	46,644	60.33%	373,847	62.46%	8,358,246	59.29%
Registered Electors	77,312		598,521		14,097,690	

=== 2004 Sri Lankan Parliamentary Election ===
Party	Bandarawela		Badulla Electoral District		Sri Lanka	
Party	Votes	%	Votes	%	Votes	%
UNP	23,791	50.25%	181,705	49.09%	3,486,792	37.73%
UPFA	21,784	46.01%	178,634	48.26%	4,223,126	45.70%
JHU	1,343	2.84%	6,932	1.87%	552,723	5.98%
Other Parties (with < 1%)	430	0.91%	2,907	0.79%	57,589	0.62%
Valid Votes	47,348	92.61%	370,178	92.47%	9,241,931	94.52%
Rejected Votes	3,780	7.39%	30,159	7.53%	534,452	5.47%
Total Polled	51,128	75.51%	400,337	78.33%	9,777,821	75.74%
Registered Electors	67,710		511,115		12,909,631	

=== 2001 Sri Lankan Parliamentary Election ===
Party	Bandarawela		Badulla Electoral District		Sri Lanka	
Party	Votes	%	Votes	%	Votes	%
UNP	25,750	53.87%	201,173	53.81%	4,086,026	45.62%
PA	17,710	37.05%	138,443	37.03%	3,330,815	37.19%
JVP	3,319	6.94%	26,820	7.17%	815,353	9.10%
IND3	592	1.24%	5,065	1.35%	6,161	0.07%
Other Parties (with < 1%)	426	0.89%	2,336	0.62%	73,230	0.82%
Valid Votes	47,797	93.10%	373,837	93.35%	8,955,844	94.77%
Rejected Votes	3,543	6.90%	26,626	6.65%	494,009	5.23%
Total Polled	51,340	78.17%	400,463	81.51%	9,449,878	76.03%
Registered Electors	65,674		491,288		12,428,762	

=== 2000 Sri Lankan Parliamentary Election ===
Party	Bandarawela		Badulla Electoral District		Sri Lanka	
Party	Votes	%	Votes	%	Votes	%
UNP	20,912	45.31%	167,351	46.36%	3,451,765	40.12%
PA	19,836	42.98%	154,172	42.71%	3,899,329	45.33%
JVP	1,928	4.18%	16,414	4.55%	518,725	6.03%
CWC	1,927	4.18%	12,092	3.35%	22,985	0.27%
Other Parties (with < 1%)	988	2.14%	5,935	1.64%	245,839	2.86%
NUA	564	1.22%	5,052	1.40%	185,593	2.16%
Valid Votes	46,155	N/A	361,016	N/A	8,602,617	N/A

=== 1994 Sri Lankan Parliamentary Election ===
Party	Bandarawela		Badulla Electoral District		Sri Lanka	
Party	Votes	%	Votes	%	Votes	%
UNP	21,713	51.21%	182,131	54.04%	3,498,370	44.04%
PA	19,545	46.09%	146,546	43.48%	3,887,805	48.94%
Other Parties (with < 1%)	680	1.60%	5,781	1.72%	206,815	2.60%
IND2	466	1.10%	2,601	0.77%	16,690	0.21%
Valid Votes	42,404	92.87%	337,059	92.19%	7,943,688	95.20%
Rejected Votes	3,255	7.13%	28,540	7.81%	400,395	4.80%
Total Polled	45,659	80.92%	365,599	82.23%	8,344,095	74.75%
Registered Electors	56,426		444,632		11,163,064	

=== 1989 Sri Lankan Parliamentary Election ===
Party	Bandarawela		Badulla Electoral District		Sri Lanka	
Party	Votes	%	Votes	%	Votes	%
UNP	14,078	54.54%	135,089	58.97%	2,838,005	50.71%
SLFP	10,444	40.46%	81,011	35.36%	1,785,369	31.90%
USA	493	1.91%	5,712	2.49%	141,983	2.54%
ELJP	432	1.67%	5,589	2.44%	67,723	1.21%
MEP	363	1.41%	1,693	0.74%	90,480	1.62%
Valid Votes	25,810	92.95%	229,094	92.08%	5,596,468	93.87%
Rejected Votes	1,958	7.05%	19,704	7.92%	365,563	6.13%
Total Polled	27,768	66.42%	248,798	75.55%	5,962,031	63.60%
Registered Electors	41,805		329,321		9,374,164	

== Demographics ==
=== Ethnicity ===
The Bandarawela Polling Division has a Sinhalese majority (70.7%) and a significant Indian Tamil population (19.3%) . In comparison, the Badulla Electoral District (which contains the Bandarawela Polling Division) has a Sinhalese majority (73.0%) and a significant Indian Tamil population (18.5%)

Ethnicity in Bandarawela
1. Sinhalese (70.7%)
2. Indian Tamil (19.3%)
3. Sri Lankan Tamil (4.80%)
4. Moor (4.80%)
5. Other (0.40%)

=== Religion ===
The Bandarawela Polling Division has a Buddhist majority (69.8%) and a significant Hindu population (21.6%) . In comparison, the Badulla Electoral District (which contains the Bandarawela Polling Division) has a Buddhist majority (72.6%) and a significant Hindu population (19.3%)

Religion in Bandarawela
1. Buddhist (69.8%)
2. Hindu (21.6%)
3. Muslim (5.00%)
4. Roman Catholic (2.50%)
5. Other Christian (1.20%)
6. Other (0.00%)
