= Senkadagala Polling Division =

Senkadagala
- Polling Division
- Coordinates: 7.288639°N 80.659114°E
- Country: Sri Lanka
- Province: Central Province, Sri Lanka
- Electoral District: Kandy Electoral District

Area
  - Total: 20.37 km^{2} (7.86 sq mi)

Population (2012)
  - Total: 62,544
  - Density: 3,070/km^{2} (8,000/sq mi)
- ISO 3166 code: EC-04H

The Senkadagala Polling Division is a Polling Division in the Kandy Electoral District, in the Central Province, Sri Lanka.

== Presidential Election Results ==
=== Summary ===
The winner of Senkadagala has matched the final country result 6 out of 8 times. Hence, Senkadagala is a Weak Bellwether for Presidential Elections.

Year	Senkadagala	Kandy Electoral District	MAE %	Sri Lanka	MAE %
2019	SLPP	SLPP	2.86%	SLPP	0.74%
2015	NDF	NDF	2.84%	NDF	6.10%
2010	UPFA	UPFA	2.11%	UPFA	5.74%
2005	UNP	UNP	0.97%	UPFA	6.82%
1999	UNP	PA	3.51%	PA	4.95%
1994	PA	PA	1.04%	PA	6.62%
1988	UNP	UNP	2.36%	UNP	1.10%
1982	UNP	UNP	1.32%	UNP	3.40%
Matches/Mean MAE	6/8	7/8	2.13%	8/8	4.43%

=== 2019 Sri Lankan Presidential Election ===
Party	Senkadagala		Kandy Electoral District		Sri Lanka	
Party	Votes	%	Votes	%	Votes	%
SLPP	35,242	53.07%	471,502	50.43%	6,924,255	52.25%
NDF	27,399	41.26%	417,355	44.64%	5,564,239	41.99%
NMPP	2,189	3.30%	23,539	2.52%	418,553	3.16%
Other Parties (with < 1%)	1,575	2.37%	22,479	2.40%	345,452	2.61%
Valid Votes	66,405	99.01%	934,875	99.04%	13,252,499	98.99%
Rejected Votes	666	0.99%	9,020	0.96%	135,452	1.01%
Total Polled	67,071	81.12%	943,895	84.89%	13,387,951	83.71%
Registered Electors	82,680		1,111,860		15,992,568	

=== 2015 Sri Lankan Presidential Election ===
Party	Senkadagala		Kandy Electoral District		Sri Lanka	
Party	Votes	%	Votes	%	Votes	%
NDF	36,127	57.59%	466,994	54.56%	6,217,162	51.28%
UPFA	26,062	41.54%	378,585	44.23%	5,768,090	47.58%
Other Parties (with < 1%)	546	0.87%	10,329	1.21%	138,200	1.14%
Valid Votes	62,735	98.69%	855,908	98.73%	12,123,452	98.85%
Rejected Votes	834	1.31%	10,993	1.27%	140,925	1.15%
Total Polled	63,569	78.34%	866,901	79.71%	12,264,377	78.69%
Registered Electors	81,149		1,087,542		15,585,942	

=== 2010 Sri Lankan Presidential Election ===
Party	Senkadagala		Kandy Electoral District		Sri Lanka	
Party	Votes	%	Votes	%	Votes	%
UPFA	28,444	52.33%	406,636	54.16%	6,015,934	57.88%
NDF	25,243	46.44%	329,492	43.89%	4,173,185	40.15%
Other Parties (with < 1%)	669	1.23%	14,658	1.95%	204,494	1.97%
Valid Votes	54,356	99.03%	750,786	98.85%	10,393,613	99.03%
Rejected Votes	534	0.97%	8,700	1.15%	101,838	0.97%
Total Polled	54,890	75.29%	759,486	75.87%	10,495,451	66.70%
Registered Electors	72,906		1,001,074		15,734,587	

=== 2005 Sri Lankan Presidential Election ===
Party	Senkadagala		Kandy Electoral District		Sri Lanka	
Party	Votes	%	Votes	%	Votes	%
UNP	28,894	55.51%	387,150	54.33%	4,706,366	48.43%
UPFA	22,670	43.55%	315,672	44.30%	4,887,152	50.29%
Other Parties (with < 1%)	488	0.94%	9,798	1.37%	123,521	1.27%
Valid Votes	52,052	98.80%	712,620	98.64%	9,717,039	98.88%
Rejected Votes	630	1.20%	9,817	1.36%	109,869	1.12%
Total Polled	52,682	76.08%	722,437	77.37%	9,826,908	69.51%
Registered Electors	69,243		933,754		14,136,979	

=== 1999 Sri Lankan Presidential Election ===
Party	Senkadagala		Kandy Electoral District		Sri Lanka	
Party	Votes	%	Votes	%	Votes	%
UNP	20,803	48.53%	276,360	45.10%	3,602,748	42.71%
PA	19,893	46.41%	308,187	50.29%	4,312,157	51.12%
JVP	1,173	2.74%	15,512	2.53%	343,927	4.08%
Other Parties (with < 1%)	565	1.32%	9,472	1.55%	140,825	1.67%
SMBP	431	1.01%	3,280	0.54%	35,854	0.43%
Valid Votes	42,865	97.25%	612,811	97.29%	8,435,754	97.69%
Rejected Votes	1,213	2.75%	17,060	2.71%	199,536	2.31%
Total Polled	44,078	74.47%	629,871	77.61%	8,635,290	72.17%
Registered Electors	59,187		811,606		11,965,536	

=== 1994 Sri Lankan Presidential Election ===
Party	Senkadagala		Kandy Electoral District		Sri Lanka	
Party	Votes	%	Votes	%	Votes	%
PA	22,323	55.58%	320,110	56.64%	4,709,205	62.28%
UNP	17,152	42.70%	235,519	41.68%	2,715,283	35.91%
Other Parties (with < 1%)	692	1.72%	9,488	1.68%	137,040	1.81%
Valid Votes	40,167	97.78%	565,117	97.55%	7,561,526	98.03%
Rejected Votes	912	2.22%	14,179	2.45%	151,706	1.97%
Total Polled	41,079	73.70%	579,296	77.85%	7,713,232	69.12%
Registered Electors	55,740		744,151		11,158,880	

=== 1988 Sri Lankan Presidential Election ===
Party	Senkadagala		Kandy Electoral District		Sri Lanka	
Party	Votes	%	Votes	%	Votes	%
UNP	16,825	52.01%	234,124	54.88%	2,569,199	50.43%
SLFP	14,690	45.41%	186,187	43.65%	2,289,857	44.95%
SLMP	834	2.58%	6,266	1.47%	235,701	4.63%
Valid Votes	32,349	98.79%	426,577	98.57%	5,094,754	98.24%
Rejected Votes	395	1.21%	6,167	1.43%	91,499	1.76%
Total Polled	32,744	67.92%	432,744	68.36%	5,186,256	55.87%
Registered Electors	48,208		633,030		9,283,143	

=== 1982 Sri Lankan Presidential Election ===
Party	Senkadagala		Kandy Electoral District		Sri Lanka	
Party	Votes	%	Votes	%	Votes	%
UNP	20,105	58.67%	289,621	59.80%	3,450,815	52.93%
SLFP	13,219	38.57%	178,647	36.89%	2,546,348	39.05%
JVP	621	1.81%	12,493	2.58%	273,428	4.19%
Other Parties (with < 1%)	324	0.95%	3,536	0.73%	249,460	3.83%
Valid Votes	34,269	99.20%	484,297	99.07%	6,520,156	98.78%
Rejected Votes	277	0.80%	4,548	0.93%	80,470	1.22%
Total Polled	34,546	79.52%	488,845	89.44%	6,600,626	80.15%
Registered Electors	43,442		546,565		8,235,358	

== Parliamentary Election Results ==
=== Summary ===
The winner of Senkadagala has matched the final country result 4 out of 7 times. Hence, Senkadagala is a Weak Bellwether for Parliamentary Elections.

Year	Senkadagala	Kandy Electoral District	MAE %	Sri Lanka	MAE %
2015	UNP	UNP	0.78%	UNP	6.74%
2010	UPFA	UPFA	6.01%	UPFA	7.00%
2004	UNP	UNP	3.43%	UPFA	8.19%
2001	UNP	UNP	3.86%	UNP	6.11%
2000	UNP	PA	5.76%	PA	5.07%
1994	UNP	UNP	2.14%	PA	2.92%
1989	UNP	UNP	3.76%	UNP	4.40%
Matches/Mean MAE	4/7	5/7	3.68%	7/7	5.78%

=== 2015 Sri Lankan Parliamentary Election ===
Party	Senkadagala		Kandy Electoral District		Sri Lanka	
Party	Votes	%	Votes	%	Votes	%
UNP	32,354	55.93%	440,761	55.61%	5,098,916	45.77%
UPFA	21,775	37.64%	309,152	39.00%	4,732,664	42.48%
JVP	3,211	5.55%	30,669	3.87%	544,154	4.88%
Other Parties (with < 1%)	505	0.87%	12,055	1.52%	100,088	0.90%
Valid Votes	57,845	97.26%	792,637	95.48%	11,140,333	95.35%
Rejected Votes	1,604	2.70%	37,065	4.46%	516,926	4.42%
Total Polled	59,474	73.29%	830,165	79.13%	11,684,111	77.66%
Registered Electors	81,149		1,049,160		15,044,490	

=== 2010 Sri Lankan Parliamentary Election ===
Party	Senkadagala		Kandy Electoral District		Sri Lanka	
Party	Votes	%	Votes	%	Votes	%
UPFA	21,431	53.33%	339,819	60.81%	4,846,388	60.38%
UNP	15,411	38.35%	192,798	34.50%	2,357,057	29.37%
DNA	2,965	7.38%	23,728	4.25%	441,251	5.50%
Other Parties (with < 1%)	375	0.93%	2,459	0.44%	30,354	0.38%
Valid Votes	40,182	93.14%	558,804	90.49%	8,026,322	96.03%
Rejected Votes	2,935	6.80%	58,333	9.45%	581,465	6.96%
Total Polled	43,140	59.17%	617,559	61.70%	8,358,246	59.29%
Registered Electors	72,906		1,000,861		14,097,690	

=== 2004 Sri Lankan Parliamentary Election ===
Party	Senkadagala		Kandy Electoral District		Sri Lanka	
Party	Votes	%	Votes	%	Votes	%
UNP	22,435	48.42%	313,859	49.99%	3,486,792	37.73%
UPFA	17,403	37.56%	268,131	42.71%	4,223,126	45.70%
JHU	6,191	13.36%	42,192	6.72%	552,723	5.98%
Other Parties (with < 1%)	309	0.67%	3,684	0.59%	64,227	0.69%
Valid Votes	46,338	95.03%	627,866	93.24%	9,241,931	94.52%
Rejected Votes	2,424	4.97%	45,484	6.75%	534,452	5.47%
Total Polled	48,762	72.78%	673,380	76.47%	9,777,821	75.74%
Registered Electors	66,995		880,634		12,909,631	

=== 2001 Sri Lankan Parliamentary Election ===
Party	Senkadagala		Kandy Electoral District		Sri Lanka	
Party	Votes	%	Votes	%	Votes	%
UNP	25,140	56.19%	314,297	52.77%	4,086,026	45.62%
PA	15,289	34.17%	233,637	39.23%	3,330,815	37.19%
JVP	3,254	7.27%	37,146	6.24%	815,353	9.10%
SU	653	1.46%	4,040	0.68%	50,665	0.57%
Other Parties (with < 1%)	409	0.91%	6,456	1.08%	78,682	0.88%
Valid Votes	44,745	95.21%	595,576	93.40%	8,955,844	94.77%
Rejected Votes	2,252	4.79%	42,103	6.60%	494,009	5.23%
Total Polled	46,997	76.20%	637,679	76.03%	9,449,878	76.03%
Registered Electors	61,677		838,687		12,428,762	

=== 2000 Sri Lankan Parliamentary Election ===
Party	Senkadagala		Kandy Electoral District		Sri Lanka	
Party	Votes	%	Votes	%	Votes	%
UNP	20,096	45.68%	243,623	40.27%	3,451,765	40.12%
PA	17,342	39.42%	282,282	46.66%	3,899,329	45.33%
SU	2,093	4.76%	10,999	1.82%	127,859	1.49%
JVP	2,027	4.61%	21,565	3.56%	518,725	6.03%
NUA	1,469	3.34%	32,023	5.29%	185,593	2.16%
Other Parties (with < 1%)	966	2.20%	14,436	2.39%	161,809	1.88%
Valid Votes	43,993	N/A	604,928	N/A	8,602,617	N/A

=== 1994 Sri Lankan Parliamentary Election ===
Party	Senkadagala		Kandy Electoral District		Sri Lanka	
Party	Votes	%	Votes	%	Votes	%
UNP	21,005	49.88%	301,824	52.35%	3,498,370	44.04%
PA	20,318	48.25%	267,683	46.43%	3,887,805	48.94%
MEP	474	1.13%	3,495	0.61%	68,538	0.86%
Other Parties (with < 1%)	317	0.75%	3,550	0.62%	107,038	1.35%
Valid Votes	42,114	96.32%	576,552	94.89%	7,943,688	95.20%
Rejected Votes	1,610	3.68%	31,019	5.11%	400,395	4.80%
Total Polled	43,724	78.44%	607,571	81.67%	8,344,095	74.75%
Registered Electors	55,740		743,939		11,163,064	

=== 1989 Sri Lankan Parliamentary Election ===
Party	Senkadagala		Kandy Electoral District		Sri Lanka	
Party	Votes	%	Votes	%	Votes	%
UNP	14,471	57.32%	204,973	61.72%	2,838,005	50.71%
SLFP	8,853	35.07%	105,977	31.91%	1,785,369	31.90%
SLMC	1,018	4.03%	14,697	4.43%	202,016	3.61%
USA	774	3.07%	5,147	1.55%	141,983	2.54%
Other Parties (with < 1%)	129	0.51%	1,315	0.40%	67,723	1.21%
Valid Votes	25,245	94.90%	332,109	93.69%	5,596,468	93.87%
Rejected Votes	1,357	5.10%	22,374	6.31%	365,563	6.13%
Total Polled	26,602	56.91%	354,483	56.42%	5,962,031	63.60%
Registered Electors	46,746		628,317		9,374,164	

== Demographics ==
=== Ethnicity ===
The Senkadagala Polling Division has a Sinhalese majority (80.6%) and a significant Moor population (10.5%) . In comparison, the Kandy Electoral District (which contains the Senkadagala Polling Division) has a Sinhalese majority (74.4%) and a significant Moor population (13.9%)

Ethnicity in Senkadagala
1. Sinhalese (80.6%)
2. Moor (10.5%)
3. Sri Lankan Tamil (6.90%)
4. Indian Tamil (1.30%)
5. Other (0.70%)

=== Religion ===
The Senkadagala Polling Division has a Buddhist majority (83.8%) and a significant Muslim population (11.1%) . In comparison, the Kandy Electoral District (which contains the Senkadagala Polling Division) has a Buddhist majority (73.4%) and a significant Muslim population (14.3%)

Religion in Senkadagala
1. Buddhist (76.8%)
2. Muslim (11.1%)
3. Roman Catholic (5.50%)
4. Hindu (5.10%)
5. Other Christian (1.60%)
6. Other (0.00%)
