= A. J. Ranasinghe =

Government minister of Sri Lanka (1927–2022)

Arthur Jaysena (A.J.) Ranasinghe

State Minister of Media
- In office 1989–1994

Personal details
- Born: 4 January 1927 Madampe, Sri Lanka
- Died: 4 May 2022 (aged 95) Colombo, Sri Lanka
- Party: United National Party
- Spouse: Seetha Ranasinghe
- Children: Apsara Ranaweera, Asela Ranasinghe, Hasitha Ranasinghe, Nayesha Dunisinghe
- Education: Sivali Central College, Ratnapura, Sri Lanka
- Occupation: Politics

Arthur Jayasena Ranasinghe (4 January 1927 – 4 May 2022) (known as A. J. Ranasinghe) was a Sri Lankan politician, State Minister and diplomat. In the third 1994 Sri Lankan presidential election he was an independent candidate and polled 22,752 votes. Ranasinghe was the first Director General of Tower Hall Theatre Foundation also he served as the Sri Lanka Deputy High Commissioner to Canada and later served as State Minister of Media under President R. Premadasa's government.

On 4 May 2022, A. J. Ranasinghe died in his home surrounded by his loved ones. His Pansukulaya was held on 5 May 2022.

== See also ==
- 1994 Sri Lankan presidential election
