= 1999 Sri Lankan presidential election =

- 21 December 1999
- Turnout: 73.31% (▲2.84pp)
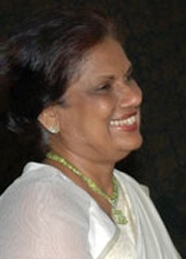

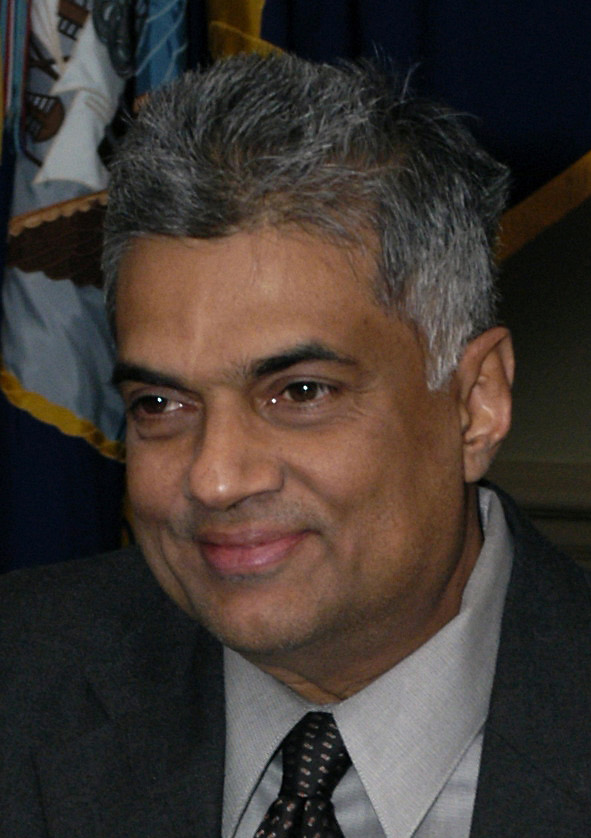
Nominee	Chandrika Kumaratunga	Ranil Wickremesinghe
Party	SLFP	UNP
Alliance	People's Alliance	—
Popular vote	4,312,157	3,602,748
Percentage	51.12%	42.71%
- Results by polling division
President before election
Chandrika Kumaratunga
SLFP
Elected President
Chandrika Kumaratunga
SLFP

Presidential elections were held in Sri Lanka on 21 December 1999. They were the fourth presidential elections held in the country's history. Incumbent president Chandrika Kumaratunga of the governing People's Alliance was re-elected for a second term, receiving 51% of the vote, defeating her main opponent Ranil Wickremesinghe of the United National Party.

== Background ==
Chandrika Kumaratunga assumed office on 12 November 1994, after winning that year's presidential election. Under the provisions of the Constitution, the president was elected to a six-year term and could call an early presidential election after completing four years of the first term. President Kumaratunga decided to call an early election, as she was constitutionally eligible, since four years of her first term were completed on 12 November 1998. She announced the Proclamation through Gazette Extraordinary No. 1102/22 on 20 October 1999.

Nominations were accepted from 9:00 am to 11:00 am IST on 16 November 1999. The election date, 21 December 1999, was announced via Gazette Extraordinary No. 531/12 on the same day.

== Campaign ==
President Kumaratunga declared her intention to run for a second term, campaigning to continue her actions against the LTTE in the country's then-ongoing civil war. The United National Party nominated Opposition Leader Ranil Wickremesinghe as its candidate, who called for direct negotiations with the LTTE.

=== Proposed debate ===
During the campaign, the UNP proposed a live presidential debate between Wickremesinghe and Kumaratunga to discuss major national issues, particularly the conflict with the LTTE, economic policies, and governance. Kumaratunga declined to participate, and as a result, the debate never took place.

=== Assassination attempt ===
On 18 December 1999, three days before the election, Kumaratunga was seriously wounded in a suicide-bomb attack at her final election rally in Colombo. The attack was carried out by a female LTTE suicide bomber. The blast killed dozens, including members of her security detail, senior police officers, journalists, and bystanders, and left over 100 others injured. Kumaratunga survived, but lost vision in her right eye and sustained facial injuries. Despite her injuries, she was sworn in for a second term on 22 December 1999 while still bandaged, vowing to fight terrorism and restore peace.

== Results ==
The results were officially declared on 22 December 1999, with Chandrika Kumaratunga winning a second term. She was sworn in later that same day at the Temple Trees, only hours after the announcement of the final results.

Candidate	Party	Votes	%
Chandrika Kumaratunga	People's Alliance	4,312,157	51.12
Ranil Wickremasinghe	United National Party	3,602,748	42.71
Nandana Gunathilake	Janatha Vimukthi Peramuna	344,173	4.08
Harischandra Wijayatunga	Sinhalaye Mahasammatha Bhoomiputra Pakshaya	35,854	0.43
W. V. M. Ranjith	Independent	27,052	0.32
Rajiva Wijesinha	Liberal Party	25,085	0.30
Vasudeva Nanayakkara	Left & Democratic Alliance	23,668	0.28
Tennyson Edirisuriya	Independent	21,119	0.25
Abdul Rasool	Sri Lanka Muslim Party	17,359	0.21
Kamal Karunadasa	People's Liberation Solidarity Front	11,333	0.13
Hudson Samarasinghe	Independent	7,184	0.09
Ariyawansa Dissanayaka	Democratic United National Front	4,039	0.05
A. W. Premawardhana	Bahujana Nidahas Peramuna	3,983	0.05
Total		8,435,754	100.00
Valid votes		8,435,754	97.69
Invalid/blank votes		199,536	2.31
Total votes		8,635,290	100.00
Registered voters/turnout		11,779,200	73.31
Source: Election Commission

Popular vote (%)
Kumaratunga	51.12%
Wickremesinghe	42.71%
Gunathilake	4.08%

Geographical Share (%)
Kumaratunga	81.25%
Wickremesinghe	18.75%
