= 1988 Sri Lankan presidential election =

- 19 December 1988
- Turnout: 55.32% (▼25.74 pp)
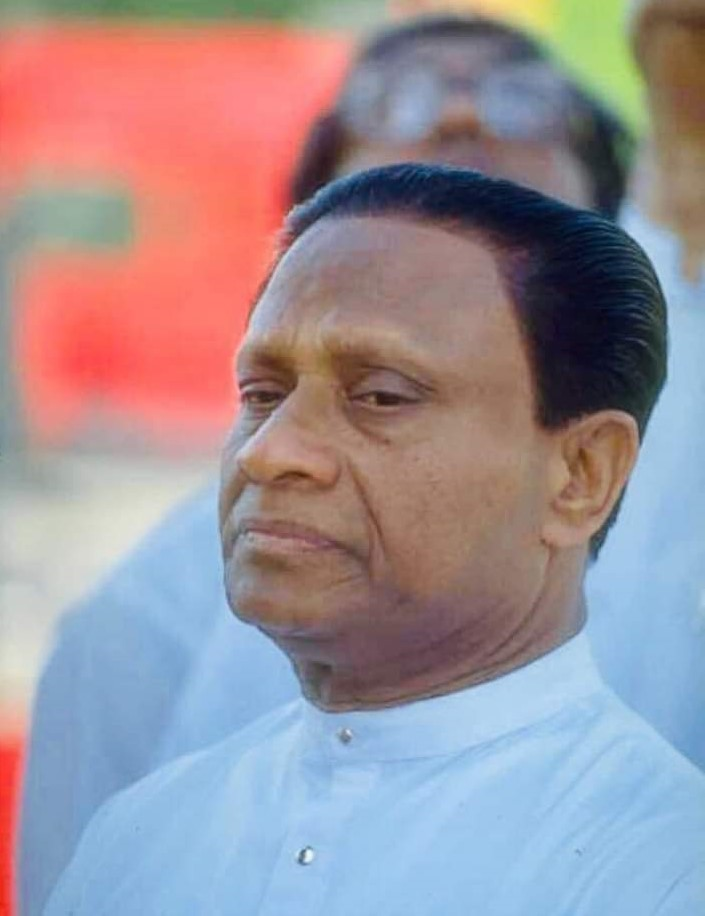

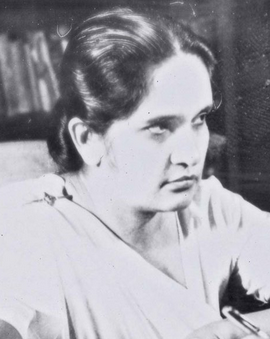
Nominee	Ranasinghe Premadasa	Sirimavo Bandaranaike
Party	UNP	SLFP
Popular vote	2,569,199	2,289,860
Percentage	50.43%	44.95%
- Results by polling division
President before election
J. R. Jayewardene
UNP
Elected President
Ranasinghe Premadasa
UNP

Presidential elections were held in Sri Lanka on 19 December 1988. They were the second presidential elections held in the country's history. Prime Minister Ranasinghe Premadasa of the governing United National Party was elected, receiving 50.4% of all votes cast and defeating both the Sri Lanka Freedom Party candidate, former Prime Minister Sirimavo Bandaranaike, and the Sri Lanka Mahajana Pakshaya candidate, Ossie Abeygunasekera.

The election was held amidst both the Sri Lankan civil war and the 1987–1989 JVP insurrection. Voter turnout was only 55%, substantially lower than the previous election and the lowest turnout for a Sri Lankan presidential election.

== Background ==
Under the provisions of the Constitution, the president is elected to a six-year term and may call for an early presidential election after completing four years of the first term. Then-incumbent president J. R. Jayawardene was inaugurated for a second term on 4 February 1983 and was constitutionally barred from seeking a third term. Jayawardene initially hinted at seeking a third term but later abandoned this plan and endorsed prime minister Ranasinghe Premadasa as the United National Party (UNP) candidate.

Nominations were accepted from 9:00 am to 11:00 am IST on 10 November 1988. The election date was announced by Gazette Extraordinary No. 531/12 on 11 November 1988.

== Campaign ==
The 1988 election was contested amidst intense political instability and violence. Both main party candidates promised to abrogate the controversial Indo-Sri Lanka Accord and remove the Indian Peace Keeping Force (IPKF) from the country. Sirimavo Bandaranaike, the SLFP candidate, accused the government of manipulating the election. Voting did not take place in LTTE-controlled areas of the north and east.

=== Election-related violence ===
The election was held amid a wave of violence and intimidation by the Janatha Vimukthi Peramuna (JVP) insurgency and retaliatory state action. According to contemporary reporting, the JVP attempted to disrupt the election with bombings, assassinations, and threats aimed at voters, election officials, and political gatherings.

In many southern towns, where the JVP was its strongest, entire villages remained deserted on polling day, with some polling stations lacking staff because of threats. Civilians reported fear of reprisals if they attempted to vote. In certain districts, hundreds of thousands were effectively disenfranchised.

There were multiple violent incidents during the campaign period and on election day. Bomb attacks occurred at party meetings, shootings targeted rally attendees, and opposition workers, especially those affiliated with the SLFP and smaller parties were killed.

The atmosphere of coercion and terror contributed to a significantly reduced voter turnout of about 55.4%, the lowest turnout for any Sri Lankan presidential election to date, indicating that many voters stayed away out of fear.

== Results ==
Despite the looming threat of the JVP insurgents, UNP candidate Ranasinghe Premadasa won a narrow but firm victory.

Candidate	Party	Votes	%
Ranasinghe Premadasa	United National Party	2,569,199	50.43
Sirimavo Bandaranaike	Sri Lanka Freedom Party	2,289,860	44.95
Ossie Abeygunasekera	Sri Lanka Mahajana Pakshaya	235,719	4.63
Total		5,094,778	100.00
Valid votes		5,094,778	98.24
Invalid/blank votes		91,445	1.76
Total votes		5,186,223	100.00
Registered voters/turnout		9,375,742	55.32
Source: Election Commission
