= People's Alliance (Sri Lanka) =

People's Alliance පොදු ජන එක්සත් පෙරමුණ பொது ஜன முன்னணி
- Leader: Anura Priyadharshana Yapa
- Secretary-General: Lasantha Alagiyawanna
- Founder: Chandrika Kumaratunga
- Founded: 1994; 32 years ago
- Succeeded by: United People's Freedom Alliance
- Headquarters: 301, 3rd Floor, T. B. Jaya Mawatha, Colombo 10
- Ideology: Social democracy
- Political position: Centre-left
- Local Government: 302 / 7,842

Election symbol
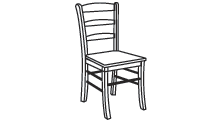
- Chair

The People's Alliance (PA; Sinhala: පොදු ජන එක්සත් පෙරමුණ; Tamil: பொது ஜன முன்னணி) is a political alliance in Sri Lanka, founded by President Chandrika Kumaratunga in 1994. The alliance came to power following its victory in the general elections that year, ending 17 years of United National Party (UNP) rule.

The alliance was dissolved in favor of a new SLFP-led alliance in 2004. In 2025, the alliance saw a revival and contested in the local government elections that year.

== History ==
=== Chandrika Kumaratunga era ===
The People's Alliance was founded in 1994 after Chandrika Kumaratunga succeeded her mother, former prime minister Sirimavo Bandaranaike, as the leader of the SLFP. The alliance was formed as a coalition consisting of the SLFP and other smaller leftist parties.

The alliance won its first elections, the 1994 parliamentary elections, in a landslide victory, defeating their main opposition the United National Party. The PA won 105 seats out of 225 in the parliament and formed a government with the support of the Sri Lanka Muslim Congress which won seven seats and the up-country People's front. Chandrika Kumaratunga was sworn in as Prime Minister on August 17, 1994. In the Presidential Election held on 9th November 1994, the Prime Minister Chandrika won with 65.2% of the votes, the largest landslide victory in Sri Lankan history.

The People's Alliance government, led by President Kumaratunga, which was elected on promises of peace, initiated talks with the LTTE, easing the Northern embargo as a goodwill gesture, to which the LTTE responded by releasing detained police officers. Four rounds of direct negotiations were held, focusing on humanitarian issues. The government aimed to pursue political dialogue in parallel with confidence-building measures, while the LTTE insisted on resolving humanitarian concerns first, postponing political discussions to a later stage. The talks ultimately collapsed after several months, following an LTTE attack on Sri Lankan naval vessels.

The PA would remain the ruling party of Sri Lanka for the next few years, successfully winning the 1999 Sri Lankan presidential election as well as the 2000 parliamentary elections. However, the alliance was defeated by the UNP-led United National Front in the 2001 parliamentary elections.

After the creation of a new SLFP-led alliance, the United People's Freedom Alliance, in 2004, most members of the People's Alliance merged into the new alliance. The CPSL and LSSP threatened to reform the PA as a separate front, however, such alliance was never formed.

=== Revival ===
In 2024, in light of the upcoming presidential elections, the SLFP proposed to form a new alliance, led by the SLFP, in opposition to the incumbent government led by president Ranil Wickremesinghe. The new alliance was revealed to be a revival of the People's Alliance, with the exact same name, which was originally founded in 1994. The SLFP announced that former president Chandrika Kumaratunga would once again be leading the alliance, and Kumaratunga's SLFP membership was restored, marking her return to politics. SLFP leader Maithripala Sirisena was appointed the chairman of the new PA.

In 2025, the party contested the local government elections that year under the leadership of Anura Priyadharshana Yapa.

== Ideology ==
The People's Alliance (PA) advocated a mixed economic approach, identifying its economic framework as a market economy complemented by targeted welfare measures. Central to its ideology was the belief in maintaining market mechanisms while simultaneously safeguarding vulnerable populations through state intervention. This was a radical departure from the dirigisme state-planned economics advocated by the SLFP at the time.

In addressing structural poverty, the PA outlined a National Programme for the Eradication of Poverty, aimed at long-term socioeconomic upliftment. Furthermore, the alliance emphasized the need for political restructuring through the vigorous implementation of a genuine and adequate devolution of power with a strong commitment to decentralization and regional autonomy within a unitary state framework.

== Member parties ==
At the time of its dissolution in 2004, the alliance consisted of the following parties:

- Sri Lanka Freedom Party
- Lanka Sama Samaja Party
- Communist Party of Sri Lanka
- Sri Lanka Mahajana Party
- Bahujana Nidahas Peramuna
- Desha Vimukthi Janatha Party
- Democratic United National Front

== Electoral history ==
=== Parliamentary ===
Election year	Votes	Vote %	Seats won	+/–	Government
1994	3,887,823	48.94%	105 / 225	▲105	Government
2000	3,900,901	45.11%	107 / 225	▲2	Government
2001	3,330,815	37.19%	77 / 225	▼30	Opposition

=== Presidential ===
Election year	Candidate	Votes	Vote %	Result
1994	Chandrika Kumaratunga	4,709,205	62.28%	Won
1999	Chandrika Kumaratunga	4,312,157	51.12%	Won

=== Local ===
Election year	Votes	Vote %	Councillors	Local Authorities	+/–	Government
2025	387,098	3.72%	300 / 7,812	0 / 341	New	Opposition
