= 1994 Sri Lankan presidential election =

- 9 November 1994
- Turnout: 70.47% (▲15.15pp)
Nominee	Chandrika Kumaratunga	Srima Dissanayake
Party	SLFP	UNP
Alliance	People's Alliance	—
Popular vote	4,709,205	2,715,283
Percentage	62.28%	35.91%
- Results by polling division
President before election
Dingiri Banda Wijetunga
UNP
Elected President
Chandrika Kumaratunga
SLFP

Presidential elections were held in Sri Lanka on 9 November 1994. They were the third presidential elections held in the country's history. Prime Minister Chandrika Kumaratunga of the governing People's Alliance was elected in a landslide victory, receiving 62% of the vote and becoming the first female President of Sri Lanka. The election marked the end of 17 years of United National Party rule in Sri Lanka.

== Background ==
President Ranasinghe Premadasa was assassinated on 1 May 1993 by the LTTE and was succeeded by prime minister Dingiri Banda Wijetunga. Under the Constitution, a president who assumed office to fill a vacancy could not call an early presidential election. Consequently, the next presidential election was scheduled between 2 November and 2 December 1994. In August 1994, Wijetunga dissolved Parliament and called for snap general elections. The People's Alliance, led by Chandrika Kumaratunga, won a parliamentary majority, and Kumaratunga was sworn in as Prime Minister on 19 August 1994.

Nominations for the presidential election were accepted on 7 October 1994, and the election date was officially announced via Gazette Extraordinary No. 839/9 on 26 October 1994.

President Wijetunga chose not to contest the election, and the UNP instead opted to pick Opposition Leader Gamini Dissanayake as its candidate in the initial campaign. Hema Premadasa, the former First Lady, also attempted to contest the presidency, but withdrew after facing organized political harassment and negative propaganda by opposition parties. The People's Alliance officially nominated Chandrika Kumaratunga as its presidential candidate.

== Campaign ==
The campaign initially involved active competition between the UNP and the People's Alliance.

=== Assassination ===
On 24 October 1994, Gamini Dissanayake was killed in a suicide bombing carried out by the LTTE, which also caused civilian casualties. Following this event, his widow Srima Dissanayake replaced him on the ballot as the UNP candidate, and security measures were heightened nationwide in response to the attack.

== Results ==
Kumaratunga won the election by a record margin with 62.28% of the vote. She became the first female President of Sri Lanka and was inaugurated at the Presidential Secretariat in Colombo on 12 November 1994.

Candidate	Party	Votes	%
Chandrika Kumaratunga	People's Alliance	4,709,205	62.28
Srima Dissanayake	United National Party	2,715,283	35.91
Hudson Samarasinghe	Independent	58,886	0.78
Harischandra Wijayatunga	Sinhalaye Mahasammatha Bhoomiputra Pakshaya	32,651	0.43
A. J. Ranasinghe	Independent	22,752	0.30
Nihal Galappaththi	Sri Lanka Progressive Front	22,749	0.30
Total		7,561,526	100.00
Valid votes		7,561,526	98.03
Invalid/blank votes		151,706	1.97
Total votes		7,713,232	100.00
Registered voters/turnout		10,945,065	70.47
Source: Election Commission

Popular vote (%)
Kumaratunga	62.28%
Dissanayake	35.91%

Geographical Share (%)
Kumaratunga	99.38%
Dissanayake	0.63%
