= 1982 Sri Lankan presidential election =

- 20 October 1982
- Turnout: 81.06%
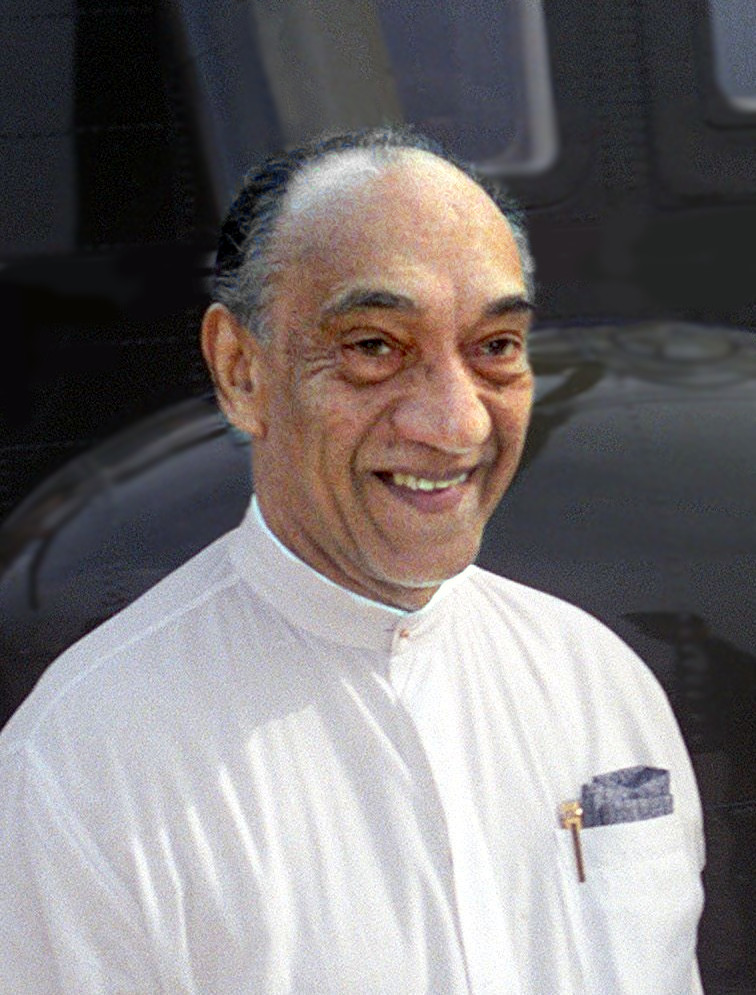
Nominee	J. R. Jayewardene	Hector Kobbekaduwa
Party	UNP	SLFP
Popular vote	3,450,811	2,548,438
Percentage	52.91%	39.07%
- Results by polling division
President before election
J. R. Jayewardene
UNP
Elected President
J. R. Jayewardene
UNP

Presidential elections were held in Sri Lanka for the first time on 20 October 1982. Incumbent president J. R. Jayewardene of the governing United National Party was re-elected, receiving 53% of all valid votes cast, defeating his main opponent Hector Kobbekaduwa of the Sri Lanka Freedom Party.

== Background ==
After winning a landslide victory in the 1977 parliamentary elections, prime minister J. R. Jayawardene introduced the executive presidency through the 2nd Amendment to the Republican Constitution of 1972. Consequently, Jayawardene was inaugurated as the 1st Executive President of Sri Lanka on 4 February 1978. As soon as he assumed office, Jayawardene introduced the 2nd Republican Constitution of 1978, which came into effect on 7 September 1978.

Under the provisions of the 1978 Constitution, the president was elected to a six-year term. Since Jayawardene's first term began on 4 February 1978, presidential elections were initially scheduled between 4 December 1983 and 4 January 1984.

However, Jayawardene passed the 3rd Amendment to the Constitution on 27 August 1982, which enabled the president to call for an early presidential election after completing four years of their first term. Since Jayawardene completed the first four years of his first term on 4 February 1982, he decided to call an early presidential election and sought reelection for a second term. The election date was scheduled for 20 October 1982.

Nominations were accepted from 8:00 am to 11:00 am (IST) on 17 September 1982 at the Election Commission. The notification for the election date was issued via Extraordinary Gazette No. 211/2 on 20 September 1982.

== Electoral system ==
The President of Sri Lanka is elected through a system of limited ranked voting. Voters can express up to three ranked preferences for the presidency. If no candidate receives more than 50% of all valid votes in the first count, all candidates except the two who received the highest number of votes are eliminated. The second and third preference votes of the eliminated candidates are then redistributed to the remaining two candidates until one of them secures an outright majority.

== Campaign ==
The election was seen as a battle between capitalism and socialism. Kobbekaduwa, supporting the policies of the previous SLFP-led government under Sirimavo Bandaranaike, was expected to reverse many of the open-market and capitalist reforms introduced by president Jayewardene.

== Results ==
Jayewardene won a clear mandate in a six-candidate race, securing 52.91% of the votes. Since he received more than half of the valid votes, no runoff was required. Voter turnout was 81.06%.

According to the 3rd Amendment, if a president is re-elected via an early presidential election, their second term begins on the anniversary of the start of their first term. Jayewardene was inaugurated for his second term on 4 February 1983.

Candidate	Party	Votes	%
J. R. Jayewardene	United National Party	3,450,811	52.91
Hector Kobbekaduwa	Sri Lanka Freedom Party	2,548,438	39.07
Rohana Wijeweera	Janatha Vimukthi Peramuna	273,428	4.19
Kumar Ponnambalam	All Ceylon Tamil Congress	173,934	2.67
Colvin R. de Silva	Lanka Sama Samaja Party	58,531	0.90
Vasudeva Nanayakkara	Nava Sama Samaja Party	17,005	0.26
Total		6,522,147	100.00
Valid votes		6,522,147	98.78
Invalid/blank votes		80,470	1.22
Total votes		6,602,617	100.00
Registered voters/turnout		8,145,015	81.06
Source: Election Commission

Popular vote (%)
Jayawardene	52.91%
Kobbekaduwa	39.07%
Wijeweera	4.19%
Ponnambalam	2.67%

Geographical Share (%)
Jayawardene	85.90%
Kobbekaduwa	8.97%
Ponnambalam	5.13%

=== By district ===
Districts won by Jayewardene
Districts won by Ponnambalam

Summary of the 1982 Sri Lankan presidential election by electoral district
Electoral District	Province	Jayewardene		Kobbekaduwa		Others		Total Valid	Rejected votes	Total Polled	Registered Electors	Turnout
Electoral District	Province	Votes	%	Votes	%	Votes	%	Total Valid	Rejected votes	Total Polled	Registered Electors	Turnout
Ampara	Eastern	90,772	56.39%	53,096	32.99%	17,102	10.62%	160,970	2,101	163,071	204,268	79.83%
Anuradhapura	North Central	117,873	49.84%	102,973	43.54%	15,677	6.63%	236,523	2,294	238,817	278,594	85.72%
Badulla	Uva	141,062	58.67%	88,462	36.79%	10,916	4.54%	240,440	2,982	243,422	280,187	86.88%
Batticaloa	Eastern	48,094	40.05%	21,688	18.06%	50,294	41.89%	120,076	2,879	122,955	172,480	71.29%
Colombo	Western	436,290	57.71%	276,476	36.57%	43,265	5.72%	756,031	7,990	764,021	972,196	78.59%
Galle	Southern	211,544	50.23%	180,925	42.96%	28,669	6.81%	421,138	5,198	426,336	512,489	83.19%
Gampaha	Western	365,838	52.50%	301,808	43.31%	29,192	4.19%	696,838	5,992	702,830	835,265	84.14%
Hambantota	Southern	90,545	45.90%	76,402	38.73%	30,331	15.37%	197,278	1,804	199,082	241,956	82.28%
Jaffna	Northern	44,780	20.54%	77,300	35.46%	95,923	44.00%	218,003	10,610	228,613	493,705	46.31%
Kalutara	Western	211,592	50.15%	185,874	44.06%	24,426	5.79%	421,892	5,290	427,182	499,215	85.57%
Kandy	Central	289,621	59.80%	178,647	36.89%	16,029	3.31%	484,297	4,548	488,845	564,767	86.56%
Kegalle	Sabaragamuwa	195,444	57.02%	126,538	36.92%	20,780	6.06%	342,762	4,537	347,299	406,548	85.43%
Kurunegala	North Western	345,769	55.77%	248,479	40.08%	25,730	4.15%	619,978	5,431	625,409	717,505	87.16%
Matale	Central	94,031	58.11%	59,299	36.65%	8,484	5.24%	161,814	1,414	163,228	187,276	87.16%
Matara	Southern	164,725	49.32%	144,587	43.29%	24,671	7.39%	333,983	3,091	337,074	399,888	84.29%
Monaragala	Uva	51,264	49.38%	44,115	42.49%	8,442	8.13%	103,821	1,553	105,374	126,558	83.26%
Nuwara Eliya	Central	109,017	63.10%	57,093	33.05%	6,659	3.85%	172,769	2,048	174,817	201,878	86.60%
Polonnaruwa	North Central	59,414	56.26%	37,243	35.26%	8,958	8.48%	105,615	1,064	106,679	127,624	83.59%
Puttalam	North Western	128,877	59.12%	80,006	36.70%	9,097	4.17%	217,980	1,995	219,975	267,675	82.18%
Ratnapura	Sabaragamuwa	175,903	50.90%	152,506	44.13%	17,195	4.98%	345,604	3,407	349,011	402,202	86.78%
Trincomalee	Eastern	45,522	48.64%	31,700	33.87%	16,374	17.49%	93,596	1,795	95,391	133,646	71.38%
Vanni	Northern	32,834	46.42%	23,221	32.83%	14,684	20.76%	70,739	2,447	73,186	119,093	61.45%
Total		3,450,811	52.91%	2,548,438	39.07%	522,898	8.02%	6,522,147	80,470	6,602,617	8,145,015	81.06%
