= Rajeewan Jayachandramurthy =

Sri Lankan politician

Hon. Rajeevan Jayachandramurthy MP

Member of Parliament for Jaffna Electoral District
- Incumbent
- Assumed office 15 November 2024
- Majority: 17,579

Personal details
- Party: National People's Power
- Profession: Politician

Rajeevan Jeyachandramoorthy is a Sri Lankan Tamil politician. He was elected to the Sri Lankan Parliament from Jaffna Electoral District as a member of the National People's Power. He belonged to Srilanka Principal service and was the principal of J/Kokuvil East Namagal Vidyalayam.
