= Sri Bhavanandaraja Shanmuganathan =

Sri Lankan politician

Hon. Sri Bhavanandaraja Shanmuganathan MP

Member of Parliament for Jaffna Electoral District
- Incumbent
- Assumed office 15 November 2024

Personal details
- Party: National People's Power
- Profession: Politician

Sri Bhavanandaraja Shanmuganathan is a Sri Lankan Tamil politician. He was elected to the Sri Lankan Parliament from Jaffna Electoral District as a member of the National People's Power.
