= Atputharajah Nadarajah =

Sri Lankan Tamil journalist and politician

Hon. Atputharajah Nadarajah

Member of Parliament for Jaffna District
- In office 1994–1999

Personal details
- Born: 16 September 1963
- Died: 2 November 1999 (aged 36)
- Party: Eelam People's Democratic Party
- Profession: Journalist
- Ethnicity: Sri Lankan Tamil

Atputharajah Nadarajah (16 September 1963 - 2 November 1999), commonly known as Ramesh was a Sri Lankan Tamil journalist and politician. He was Chief Editor of Thinamurasu, a Tamil weekly. He was a member of the Sri Lankan Parliament from the Jaffna District as a member of the paramilitary Eelam People's Democratic Party. He criticised his own party, EDDP, in his newspaper Thinamurasu and supported Tamil nationalism and the LTTE and leading to a dispute with his party and leader, Douglas Devananda. He was shot dead along with his driver in Colombo on 2 November 1999.
