= Point Pedro Polling Division =

Point Pedro
- Polling Division
- Coordinates: 9.675482°N 80.340672°E
- Country: Sri Lanka
- Province: Northern Province, Sri Lanka
- Electoral District: Jaffna Electoral District

Area
  - Total: 178.61 km^{2} (68.96 sq mi)

Population (2012)
  - Total: 60,331
  - Density: 338/km^{2} (880/sq mi)
- ISO 3166 code: EC-10G

The Point Pedro Polling Division is a Polling Division in the Jaffna Electoral District, in the Northern Province, Sri Lanka.

== Presidential Election Results ==
=== Summary ===
The winner of Point Pedro has matched the final country result 2 out of 8 times.

Year	Point Pedro	Jaffna Electoral District	MAE %	Sri Lanka	MAE %
2019	NDF	NDF	1.41%	SLPP	40.34%
2015	NDF	NDF	3.25%	NDF	27.31%
2010	NDF	NDF	4.92%	UPFA	34.19%
2005	UNP	UNP	1.09%	UPFA	23.51%
1999	UNP	PA	8.30%	PA	11.24%
1994	PA	PA	3.57%	PA	36.40%
1988	SLFP	SLFP	3.34%	UNP	14.21%
1982	SLFP	ACTC	4.16%	UNP	18.83%
Matches/Mean MAE	2/8	3/8	3.75%	8/8	25.75%

=== 2019 Sri Lankan Presidential Election ===
Party	Point Pedro		Jaffna Electoral District		Sri Lanka	
Party	Votes	%	Votes	%	Votes	%
NDF	19,931	82.31%	312,722	83.86%	5,564,239	41.99%
SLPP	1,848	7.63%	23,261	6.24%	6,924,255	52.25%
Other Parties (with < 1%)	1,362	5.62%	23,295	6.25%	717,212	5.41%
IND10	644	2.66%	6,845	1.84%	12,256	0.09%
DUNF	431	1.78%	6,790	1.82%	34,537	0.26%
Valid Votes	24,216	97.15%	372,913	97.07%	13,252,499	98.99%
Rejected Votes	710	2.85%	11,251	2.93%	135,452	1.01%
Total Polled	24,926	67.96%	384,164	68.00%	13,387,951	83.71%
Registered Electors	36,677		564,984		15,992,568	

=== 2015 Sri Lankan Presidential Election ===
Party	Point Pedro		Jaffna Electoral District		Sri Lanka	
Party	Votes	%	Votes	%	Votes	%
NDF	17,388	77.90%	253,574	74.42%	6,217,162	51.28%
UPFA	4,213	18.88%	74,454	21.85%	5,768,090	47.58%
Other Parties (with < 1%)	719	3.22%	12,723	3.73%	138,200	1.14%
Valid Votes	22,320	97.48%	340,751	97.14%	12,123,452	98.85%
Rejected Votes	576	2.52%	10,038	2.86%	140,925	1.15%
Total Polled	22,896	63.36%	350,789	64.22%	12,264,377	78.69%
Registered Electors	36,138		546,265		15,585,942	

=== 2010 Sri Lankan Presidential Election ===
Party	Point Pedro		Jaffna Electoral District		Sri Lanka	
Party	Votes	%	Votes	%	Votes	%
NDF	8,585	69.30%	113,877	63.84%	4,173,185	40.15%
UPFA	2,361	19.06%	44,154	24.75%	6,015,934	57.88%
Other Parties (with < 1%)	666	5.38%	10,438	5.85%	132,316	1.27%
Ind 5	326	2.63%	3,205	1.80%	9,662	0.09%
UDF	227	1.83%	3,325	1.86%	23,290	0.22%
DUNF	223	1.80%	3,370	1.89%	39,226	0.38%
Valid Votes	12,388	96.57%	178,369	96.35%	10,393,613	99.03%
Rejected Votes	440	3.43%	6,763	3.65%	101,838	0.97%
Total Polled	12,828	26.39%	185,132	25.15%	10,495,451	66.70%
Registered Electors	48,613		736,032		15,734,587	

=== 2005 Sri Lankan Presidential Election ===
Party	Point Pedro		Jaffna Electoral District		Sri Lanka	
Party	Votes	%	Votes	%	Votes	%
UNP	25	71.43%	5,523	70.20%	4,706,366	48.43%
UPFA	9	25.71%	1,967	25.00%	4,887,152	50.29%
NLF	1	2.86%	24	0.31%	9,296	0.10%
Valid Votes	35	89.74%	7,868	92.30%	9,717,039	98.88%
Rejected Votes	4	10.26%	656	7.70%	109,869	1.12%
Total Polled	39	0.08%	8,524	1.20%	9,826,908	69.51%
Registered Electors	47,188		707,970		14,136,979	

=== 1999 Sri Lankan Presidential Election ===
Party	Point Pedro		Jaffna Electoral District		Sri Lanka	
Party	Votes	%	Votes	%	Votes	%
UNP	4,270	52.60%	48,005	43.03%	3,602,748	42.71%
PA	3,062	37.72%	52,043	46.65%	4,312,157	51.12%
Other Parties (with < 1%)	433	5.33%	6,256	5.61%	469,886	5.57%
LDA	258	3.18%	3,394	3.04%	23,668	0.28%
Ind 2	95	1.17%	1,873	1.68%	27,052	0.32%
Valid Votes	8,118	94.71%	111,568	94.91%	8,435,754	97.69%
Rejected Votes	453	5.29%	5,981	5.09%	199,536	2.31%
Total Polled	8,571	20.26%	117,549	19.15%	8,635,290	72.17%
Registered Electors	42,304		613,718		11,965,536	

=== 1994 Sri Lankan Presidential Election ===
Party	Point Pedro		Jaffna Electoral District		Sri Lanka	
Party	Votes	%	Votes	%	Votes	%
PA	8	100.00%	16,934	96.35%	4,709,205	62.28%
Valid Votes	8	100.00%	17,575	99.20%	7,561,526	98.03%

=== 1988 Sri Lankan Presidential Election ===
Party	Point Pedro		Jaffna Electoral District		Sri Lanka	
Party	Votes	%	Votes	%	Votes	%
SLFP	3,921	41.49%	44,197	36.82%	2,289,857	44.95%
SLMP	2,910	30.79%	42,198	35.15%	235,701	4.63%
UNP	2,620	27.72%	33,650	28.03%	2,569,199	50.43%
Valid Votes	9,451	92.45%	120,045	93.38%	5,094,754	98.24%
Rejected Votes	772	7.55%	8,517	6.62%	91,499	1.76%
Total Polled	10,223	25.45%	128,562	23.30%	5,186,256	55.87%
Registered Electors	40,175		551,713		9,283,143	

=== 1982 Sri Lankan Presidential Election ===
Party	Point Pedro		Jaffna Electoral District		Sri Lanka	
Party	Votes	%	Votes	%	Votes	%
SLFP	6,348	41.04%	77,210	35.42%	2,546,348	39.05%
ACTC	5,367	34.70%	87,263	40.03%	173,934	2.67%
UNP	3,198	20.67%	44,775	20.54%	3,450,815	52.93%
LSSP	217	1.40%	3,376	1.55%	58,531	0.90%
JVP	189	1.22%	3,098	1.42%	273,428	4.19%
Other Parties (with < 1%)	150	0.97%	2,176	1.00%	16,995	0.26%
Valid Votes	15,469	96.36%	218,003	95.36%	6,520,156	98.78%
Rejected Votes	585	3.64%	10,610	4.64%	80,470	1.22%
Total Polled	16,054	46.05%	228,613	45.86%	6,600,626	80.15%
Registered Electors	34,859		498,545		8,235,358	

== Parliamentary Election Results ==
=== Summary ===
The winner of Point Pedro has matched the final country result 0 out of 7 times.

Year	Point Pedro	Jaffna Electoral District	MAE %	Sri Lanka	MAE %
2015	ITAK	ITAK	2.87%	UNP	36.96%
2010	ITAK	ITAK	3.76%	UPFA	23.59%
2004	ITAK	ITAK	5.01%	UPFA	6.50%
2001	TULF	TULF	8.53%	UNP	19.78%
2000	ACTC	EPDP	10.07%	PA	12.16%
1994	IND1	IND2	61.42%	PA	0.60%
1989	INDI	INDI	2.26%	UNP	25.32%
Matches/Mean MAE	0/7	0/7	13.42%	7/7	17.84%

=== 2015 Sri Lankan Parliamentary Election ===
Party	Point Pedro		Jaffna Electoral District		Sri Lanka	
Party	Votes	%	Votes	%	Votes	%
ITAK	12,678	66.43%	207,577	70.08%	515,963	4.63%
EPDP	1,920	10.06%	30,232	10.21%	33,481	0.30%
AITC	1,858	9.73%	15,022	5.07%	18,644	0.17%
UNP	1,187	6.22%	20,025	6.76%	5,098,916	45.77%
UPFA	1,050	5.50%	17,309	5.84%	4,732,664	42.48%
Other Parties (with < 1%)	393	2.06%	6,034	2.04%	580,476	5.21%
Valid Votes	19,086	91.18%	296,199	90.91%	11,140,333	95.35%
Rejected Votes	1,631	7.79%	25,496	7.83%	516,926	4.42%
Total Polled	20,932	57.92%	325,805	61.56%	11,684,111	77.66%
Registered Electors	36,138		529,239		15,044,490	

=== 2010 Sri Lankan Parliamentary Election ===
Party	Point Pedro		Jaffna Electoral District		Sri Lanka	
Party	Votes	%	Votes	%	Votes	%
ITAK	3,783	38.24%	65,119	44.03%	233,190	2.91%
UPFA	3,402	34.38%	47,622	32.20%	4,846,388	60.38%
AITC	1,123	11.35%	6,362	4.30%	7,544	0.09%
UNP	697	7.04%	12,624	8.54%	2,357,057	29.37%
Other Parties (with < 1%)	408	4.12%	12,362	8.36%	492,201	6.13%
IG1J	267	2.70%	2,648	1.79%	2,648	0.03%
IG3J	214	2.16%	1,161	0.79%	1,161	0.01%
Valid Votes	9,894	89.04%	147,898	87.89%	8,026,322	96.03%
Rejected Votes	1,194	10.75%	19,774	11.75%	581,465	6.96%
Total Polled	11,112	22.86%	168,277	22.68%	8,358,246	59.29%
Registered Electors	48,613		742,005		14,097,690	

=== 2004 Sri Lankan Parliamentary Election ===
Party	Point Pedro		Jaffna Electoral District		Sri Lanka	
Party	Votes	%	Votes	%	Votes	%
ITAK	22,400	95.84%	257,320	90.60%	633,203	6.85%
EPDP	676	2.89%	18,612	6.55%	24,942	0.27%
IP1D	248	1.06%	5,156	1.82%	6,121	0.07%
Other Parties (with < 1%)	48	0.21%	2,938	1.03%	764,786	8.28%
Valid Votes	23,372	95.79%	284,026	93.04%	9,241,931	94.52%
Rejected Votes	1,028	4.21%	21,233	6.96%	534,452	5.47%
Total Polled	24,400	53.68%	305,259	46.65%	9,777,821	75.74%
Registered Electors	45,457		654,415		12,909,631	

=== 2001 Sri Lankan Parliamentary Election ===
Party	Point Pedro		Jaffna Electoral District		Sri Lanka	
Party	Votes	%	Votes	%	Votes	%
TULF	8,525	64.54%	102,324	54.84%	348,164	3.89%
EPDP	2,736	20.71%	57,208	30.66%	72,783	0.81%
UNP	1,273	9.64%	16,245	8.71%	4,086,026	45.62%
DLF	429	3.25%	2,054	1.10%	6,214	0.07%
Other Parties (with < 1%)	245	1.85%	8,767	4.70%	1,046,289	11.68%
Valid Votes	13,208	94.13%	186,598	94.59%	8,955,844	94.77%
Rejected Votes	823	5.87%	10,681	5.41%	494,009	5.23%
Total Polled	14,031	32.56%	197,279	31.14%	9,449,878	76.03%
Registered Electors	43,087		633,457		12,428,762	

=== 2000 Sri Lankan Parliamentary Election ===
Party	Point Pedro		Jaffna Electoral District		Sri Lanka	
Party	Votes	%	Votes	%	Votes	%
ACTC	2,493	30.66%	10,618	9.24%	27,289	0.32%
EPDP	1,862	22.90%	41,536	36.13%	50,702	0.59%
TULF	1,540	18.94%	32,761	28.50%	105,907	1.23%
UNP	978	12.03%	10,896	9.48%	3,451,765	40.12%
DPLF	705	8.67%	4,778	4.16%	20,655	0.24%
Other Parties (with < 1%)	249	3.06%	7,419	6.45%	903,409	10.50%
IG2	180	2.21%	4,905	4.27%	31,443	0.37%
IG6	123	1.51%	2,058	1.79%	3,162	0.04%
Valid Votes	8,130	N/A	114,971	N/A	8,602,617	N/A

=== 1994 Sri Lankan Parliamentary Election ===
Party	Point Pedro		Jaffna Electoral District		Sri Lanka	
Party	Votes	%	Votes	%	Votes	%
IND1	31	91.18%	374	2.77%	48,199	0.61%
IND2	3	8.82%	10,744	79.71%	16,690	0.21%
Valid Votes	34	97.14%	13,479	97.41%	7,943,688	95.20%
Rejected Votes	1	2.86%	358	2.59%	400,395	4.80%
Total Polled	35	0.09%	13,837	2.32%	8,344,095	74.75%
Registered Electors	40,336		596,375		11,163,064	

=== 1989 Sri Lankan Parliamentary Election ===
Party	Point Pedro		Jaffna Electoral District		Sri Lanka	
Party	Votes	%	Votes	%	Votes	%
INDI	5,860	59.44%	150,340	62.68%	175,579	3.14%
TULF	2,428	24.63%	60,013	25.02%	188,594	3.37%
UNP	569	5.77%	5,460	2.28%	2,838,005	50.71%
DPLF	384	3.90%	7,993	3.33%	19,150	0.34%
ACTC	342	3.47%	7,610	3.17%	7,610	0.14%
SLMC	275	2.79%	8,439	3.52%	202,016	3.61%
Valid Votes	9,858	91.69%	239,855	90.49%	5,596,468	93.87%
Rejected Votes	894	8.31%	25,203	9.51%	365,563	6.13%
Total Polled	10,752	26.84%	265,058	44.76%	5,962,031	63.60%
Registered Electors	40,060		592,210		9,374,164	

== Demographics ==
=== Ethnicity ===
The Point Pedro Polling Division has a Sri Lankan Tamil majority (99.1%) . In comparison, the Jaffna Electoral District (which contains the Point Pedro Polling Division) has a Sri Lankan Tamil majority (98.6%)

Ethnicity in Point Pedro
1. Sri Lankan Tamil (99.1%)
2. Other (0.90%)

=== Religion ===
The Point Pedro Polling Division has a Hindu majority (80.6%) and a significant Roman Catholic population (16.8%) . In comparison, the Jaffna Electoral District (which contains the Point Pedro Polling Division) has a Hindu majority (82.6%) and a significant Roman Catholic population (12.6%)

Religion in Point Pedro
1. Hindu (80.6%)
2. Roman Catholic (16.8%)
3. Other Christian (2.10%)
4. Other (0.50%)
