= Kilinochchi Polling Division =

Kilinochchi
- Polling Division
- Coordinates: 9.469341°N 80.209104°E
- Country: Sri Lanka
- Province: Northern Province, Sri Lanka
- Electoral District: Jaffna Electoral District

Area
  - Total: 1,314.4 km^{2} (507.5 sq mi)

Population (2012)
  - Total: 113,510
  - Density: 86/km^{2} (220/sq mi)
- ISO 3166 code: EC-10K

The Kilinochchi Polling Division is a Polling Division in the Jaffna Electoral District in the Northern Province Sri Lanka.

== Presidential Election Results ==
=== Summary ===
The winner of Kilinochchi has matched the final country result 2 out of 8 times.

Year	Kilinochchi	Jaffna Electoral District	MAE %	Sri Lanka	MAE %
2019	NDF	NDF	2.82%	SLPP	43.69%
2015	NDF	NDF	2.34%	NDF	21.58%
2010	NDF	NDF	9.49%	UPFA	38.42%
2005	UNP	UNP	27.21%	UPFA	50.27%
1999	UNP	PA	16.52%	PA	19.76%
1994	PA	PA	2.79%	PA	30.64%
1988	SLFP	SLFP	6.70%	UNP	10.79%
1982	ACTC	ACTC	10.19%	UNP	25.15%
Matches/Mean MAE	2/8	3/8	9.76%	8/8	30.04%

=== 2019 Sri Lankan Presidential Election ===
Party	Kilinochchi		Jaffna Electoral District		Sri Lanka	
Party	Votes	%	Votes	%	Votes	%
NDF	55,585	87.11%	312,722	83.86%	5,564,239	41.99%
Other Parties (with < 1%)	3,949	6.19%	30,140	8.08%	729,468	5.50%
SLPP	3,238	5.07%	23,261	6.24%	6,924,255	52.25%
DUNF	1,041	1.63%	6,790	1.82%	34,537	0.26%
Valid Votes	63,813	97.28%	372,913	97.07%	13,252,499	98.99%
Rejected Votes	1,782	2.72%	11,251	2.93%	135,452	1.01%
Total Polled	65,595	75.68%	384,164	68.00%	13,387,951	83.71%
Registered Electors	86,670		564,984		15,992,568	

=== 2015 Sri Lankan Presidential Election ===
Party	Kilinochchi		Jaffna Electoral District		Sri Lanka	
Party	Votes	%	Votes	%	Votes	%
NDF	38,856	72.11%	253,574	74.42%	6,217,162	51.28%
UPFA	13,300	24.68%	74,454	21.85%	5,768,090	47.58%
Other Parties (with < 1%)	1,730	3.21%	12,723	3.73%	138,200	1.14%
Valid Votes	53,886	96.52%	340,751	97.14%	12,123,452	98.85%
Rejected Votes	1,940	3.48%	10,038	2.86%	140,925	1.15%
Total Polled	55,826	70.58%	350,789	64.22%	12,264,377	78.69%
Registered Electors	79,093		546,265		15,585,942	

=== 2010 Sri Lankan Presidential Election ===
Party	Kilinochchi		Jaffna Electoral District		Sri Lanka	
Party	Votes	%	Votes	%	Votes	%
NDF	4,717	75.11%	113,877	63.84%	4,173,185	40.15%
UPFA	991	15.78%	44,154	24.75%	6,015,934	57.88%
Other Parties (with < 1%)	373	5.94%	16,968	9.51%	165,268	1.59%
DUNF	199	3.17%	3,370	1.89%	39,226	0.38%
Valid Votes	6,280	95.64%	178,369	96.35%	10,393,613	99.03%
Rejected Votes	286	4.36%	6,763	3.65%	101,838	0.97%
Total Polled	6,566	7.23%	185,132	25.15%	10,495,451	66.70%
Registered Electors	90,811		736,032		15,734,587	

=== 2005 Sri Lankan Presidential Election ===
Party	Kilinochchi		Jaffna Electoral District		Sri Lanka	
Party	Votes	%	Votes	%	Votes	%
UNP	1	100.00%	5,523	70.20%	4,706,366	48.43%
Valid Votes	1	100.00%	7,868	92.30%	9,717,039	98.88%

=== 1999 Sri Lankan Presidential Election ===
Party	Kilinochchi		Jaffna Electoral District		Sri Lanka	
Party	Votes	%	Votes	%	Votes	%
UNP	1,262	62.60%	48,005	43.03%	3,602,748	42.71%
PA	593	29.41%	52,043	46.65%	4,312,157	51.12%
Other Parties (with < 1%)	49	2.43%	3,847	3.45%	427,442	5.07%
LDA	33	1.64%	3,394	3.04%	23,668	0.28%
SLMP	31	1.54%	1,041	0.93%	17,359	0.21%
Ind 2	26	1.29%	1,873	1.68%	27,052	0.32%
Liberal	22	1.09%	1,368	1.23%	25,085	0.30%
Valid Votes	2,016	94.51%	111,568	94.91%	8,435,754	97.69%
Rejected Votes	117	5.49%	5,981	5.09%	199,536	2.31%
Total Polled	2,133	3.76%	117,549	19.15%	8,635,290	72.17%
Registered Electors	56,792		613,718		11,965,536	

=== 1994 Sri Lankan Presidential Election ===
Party	Kilinochchi		Jaffna Electoral District		Sri Lanka	
Party	Votes	%	Votes	%	Votes	%
PA	174	93.55%	16,934	96.35%	4,709,205	62.28%
UNP	9	4.84%	223	1.27%	2,715,283	35.91%
SLPF	2	1.08%	25	0.14%	22,749	0.30%
Other Parties (with < 1%)	1	0.54%	393	2.24%	114,291	1.51%
Valid Votes	186	96.37%	17,575	99.20%	7,561,526	98.03%
Rejected Votes	7	3.63%	141	0.80%	151,706	1.97%
Total Polled	193	0.34%	17,716	2.97%	7,713,232	69.12%
Registered Electors	55,995		596,422		11,158,880	

=== 1988 Sri Lankan Presidential Election ===
Party	Kilinochchi		Jaffna Electoral District		Sri Lanka	
Party	Votes	%	Votes	%	Votes	%
SLFP	4,064	38.88%	44,197	36.82%	2,289,857	44.95%
UNP	3,793	36.29%	33,650	28.03%	2,569,199	50.43%
SLMP	2,596	24.83%	42,198	35.15%	235,701	4.63%
Valid Votes	10,453	96.51%	120,045	93.38%	5,094,754	98.24%
Rejected Votes	378	3.49%	8,517	6.62%	91,499	1.76%
Total Polled	10,831	20.21%	128,562	23.30%	5,186,256	55.87%
Registered Electors	53,604		551,713		9,283,143	

=== 1982 Sri Lankan Presidential Election ===
Party	Kilinochchi		Jaffna Electoral District		Sri Lanka	
Party	Votes	%	Votes	%	Votes	%
ACTC	9,822	54.30%	87,263	40.03%	173,934	2.67%
SLFP	4,188	23.15%	77,210	35.42%	2,546,348	39.05%
UNP	3,616	19.99%	44,775	20.54%	3,450,815	52.93%
Other Parties (with < 1%)	273	1.51%	5,552	2.55%	75,526	1.16%
JVP	188	1.04%	3,098	1.42%	273,428	4.19%
Valid Votes	18,087	94.70%	218,003	95.36%	6,520,156	98.78%
Rejected Votes	1,012	5.30%	10,610	4.64%	80,470	1.22%
Total Polled	19,099	48.02%	228,613	45.86%	6,600,626	80.15%
Registered Electors	39,773		498,545		8,235,358	

== Parliamentary Election Results ==
=== Summary ===
The winner of Kilinochchi has matched the final country result 0 out of 7 times.

Year	Kilinochchi	Jaffna Electoral District	MAE %	Sri Lanka	MAE %
2015	ITAK	ITAK	6.34%	UNP	40.01%
2010	ITAK	ITAK	2.94%	UPFA	23.17%
2004	ITAK	ITAK	7.84%	UPFA	6.70%
2001	TULF	TULF	5.58%	UNP	19.24%
2000	UNP	EPDP	11.26%	PA	3.80%
1994	SLMC	IND2	72.10%	PA	1.56%
1989	TULF	INDI	18.06%	UNP	24.56%
Matches/Mean MAE	0/7	0/7	17.73%	7/7	17.01%

=== 2015 Sri Lankan Parliamentary Election ===
Party	Kilinochchi		Jaffna Electoral District		Sri Lanka	
Party	Votes	%	Votes	%	Votes	%
ITAK	38,155	77.82%	207,577	70.08%	515,963	4.63%
EPDP	6,417	13.09%	30,232	10.21%	33,481	0.30%
UNP	1,646	3.36%	20,025	6.76%	5,098,916	45.77%
UPFA	1,285	2.62%	17,309	5.84%	4,732,664	42.48%
Other Parties (with < 1%)	997	2.03%	6,034	2.04%	580,476	5.21%
AITC	532	1.09%	15,022	5.07%	18,644	0.17%
Valid Votes	49,032	90.87%	296,199	90.91%	11,140,333	95.35%
Rejected Votes	4,689	8.69%	25,496	7.83%	516,926	4.42%
Total Polled	53,957	68.22%	325,805	61.56%	11,684,111	77.66%
Registered Electors	79,093		529,239		15,044,490	

=== 2010 Sri Lankan Parliamentary Election ===
Party	Kilinochchi		Jaffna Electoral District		Sri Lanka	
Party	Votes	%	Votes	%	Votes	%
ITAK	4,192	45.82%	65,119	44.03%	233,190	2.91%
UPFA	3,367	36.81%	47,622	32.20%	4,846,388	60.38%
TULF	497	5.43%	2,892	1.96%	9,223	0.11%
UNP	386	4.22%	12,624	8.54%	2,357,057	29.37%
DUA	255	2.79%	764	0.52%	1,270	0.02%
Other Parties (with < 1%)	250	2.73%	17,056	11.53%	490,961	6.12%
PERLF	201	2.20%	1,821	1.23%	2,100	0.03%
Valid Votes	9,148	83.02%	147,898	87.89%	8,026,322	96.03%
Rejected Votes	1,807	16.40%	19,774	11.75%	581,465	6.96%
Total Polled	11,019	12.13%	168,277	22.68%	8,358,246	59.29%
Registered Electors	90,811		742,005		14,097,690	

=== 2004 Sri Lankan Parliamentary Election ===
Party	Kilinochchi		Jaffna Electoral District		Sri Lanka	
Party	Votes	%	Votes	%	Votes	%
ITAK	29,574	98.78%	257,320	90.60%	633,203	6.85%
Other Parties (with < 1%)	365	1.22%	26,706	9.40%	795,849	8.61%
Valid Votes	29,939	93.12%	284,026	93.04%	9,241,931	94.52%
Rejected Votes	2,213	6.88%	21,233	6.96%	534,452	5.47%
Total Polled	32,152	55.46%	305,259	46.65%	9,777,821	75.74%
Registered Electors	57,975		654,415		12,909,631	

=== 2001 Sri Lankan Parliamentary Election ===
Party	Kilinochchi		Jaffna Electoral District		Sri Lanka	
Party	Votes	%	Votes	%	Votes	%
TULF	1,100	60.74%	102,324	54.84%	348,164	3.89%
EPDP	431	23.80%	57,208	30.66%	72,783	0.81%
UNP	191	10.55%	16,245	8.71%	4,086,026	45.62%
INDP	68	3.75%	2,677	1.43%	2,900	0.03%
Other Parties (with < 1%)	21	1.16%	8,144	4.36%	1,049,603	11.72%
Valid Votes	1,811	93.16%	186,598	94.59%	8,955,844	94.77%
Rejected Votes	133	6.84%	10,681	5.41%	494,009	5.23%
Total Polled	1,944	3.38%	197,279	31.14%	9,449,878	76.03%
Registered Electors	57,595		633,457		12,428,762	

=== 2000 Sri Lankan Parliamentary Election ===
Party	Kilinochchi		Jaffna Electoral District		Sri Lanka	
Party	Votes	%	Votes	%	Votes	%
UNP	278	32.67%	10,896	9.48%	3,451,765	40.12%
EPDP	216	25.38%	41,536	36.13%	50,702	0.59%
IG2	138	16.22%	4,905	4.27%	31,443	0.37%
TULF	119	13.98%	32,761	28.50%	105,907	1.23%
ACTC	43	5.05%	10,618	9.24%	27,289	0.32%
DPLF	24	2.82%	4,778	4.16%	20,655	0.24%
IG6	18	2.12%	2,058	1.79%	3,162	0.04%
Other Parties (with < 1%)	15	1.76%	7,419	6.45%	903,409	10.50%
Valid Votes	851	N/A	114,971	N/A	8,602,617	N/A

=== 1994 Sri Lankan Parliamentary Election ===
Party	Kilinochchi		Jaffna Electoral District		Sri Lanka	
Party	Votes	%	Votes	%	Votes	%
SLMC	56	84.85%	2,098	15.56%	143,307	1.80%
IND1	6	9.09%	374	2.77%	48,199	0.61%
EPRLF	2	3.03%	263	1.95%	9,411	0.12%
IND2	2	3.03%	10,744	79.71%	16,690	0.21%
Valid Votes	66	100.00%	13,479	97.41%	7,943,688	95.20%

=== 1989 Sri Lankan Parliamentary Election ===
Party	Kilinochchi		Jaffna Electoral District		Sri Lanka	
Party	Votes	%	Votes	%	Votes	%
TULF	8,850	42.30%	60,013	25.02%	188,594	3.37%
INDI	8,576	40.99%	150,340	62.68%	175,579	3.14%
UNP	1,522	7.27%	5,460	2.28%	2,838,005	50.71%
DPLF	740	3.54%	7,993	3.33%	19,150	0.34%
SLMC	669	3.20%	8,439	3.52%	202,016	3.61%
ACTC	565	2.70%	7,610	3.17%	7,610	0.14%
Valid Votes	20,922	85.31%	239,855	90.49%	5,596,468	93.87%
Rejected Votes	3,603	14.69%	25,203	9.51%	365,563	6.13%
Total Polled	24,525	45.91%	265,058	44.76%	5,962,031	63.60%
Registered Electors	53,421		592,210		9,374,164	

== Demographics ==
=== Ethnicity ===
The Kilinochchi Polling Division has a Sri Lankan Tamil majority (97.3%) . In comparison, the Jaffna Electoral District (which contains the Kilinochchi Polling Division) has a Sri Lankan Tamil majority (98.6%)

Ethnicity in Kilinochchi
1. Sri Lankan Tamil (97.3%)
2. Other (1.50%)
3. Sinhalese (1.20%)

=== Religion ===
The Kilinochchi Polling Division has a Hindu majority (81.9%) and a significant Roman Catholic population (10.6%) . In comparison, the Jaffna Electoral District (which contains the Kilinochchi Polling Division) has a Hindu majority (82.6%) and a significant Roman Catholic population (12.6%)

Religion in Kilinochchi
1. Hindu (81.9%)
2. Roman Catholic (10.6%)
3. Other Christian (5.70%)
4. Buddhist (1.10%)
5. Other (0.70%)
