= Kankesanthurai Polling Division =

Kankesanthurai
- Polling Division
- Coordinates: 9.781182°N 80.033631°E
- Country: Sri Lanka
- Province: Northern Province, Sri Lanka
- Electoral District: Jaffna Electoral District

Area
  - Total: 99.28 km^{2} (38.33 sq mi)

Population (2012)
  - Total: 82,534
  - Density: 831/km^{2} (2,150/sq mi)

The Kankesanthurai Polling Division is a Polling Division in the Jaffna Electoral District, in the Northern Province, Sri Lanka.

== Presidential Election Results ==
=== Summary ===
The winner of Kankesanthurai has matched the final country result 3 out of 8 times.

Year	Kankesanthurai	Jaffna Electoral District	MAE %	Sri Lanka	MAE %
2019	NDF	NDF	0.59%	SLPP	41.61%
2015	NDF	NDF	1.06%	NDF	23.24%
2010	NDF	NDF	6.14%	UPFA	21.97%
2005	UNP	UNP	12.43%	UPFA	10.65%
1999	PA	PA	14.30%	PA	12.64%
1994	PA	PA	4.89%	PA	29.31%
1988	SLMP	SLFP	4.12%	UNP	19.50%
1982	SLFP	ACTC	8.55%	UNP	22.14%
Matches/Mean MAE	3/8	3/8	6.51%	8/8	22.63%

=== 2019 Sri Lankan Presidential Election ===
Party	Kankesanthurai		Jaffna Electoral District		Sri Lanka	
Party	Votes	%	Votes	%	Votes	%
NDF	23,773	83.20%	312,722	83.86%	5,564,239	41.99%
Other Parties (with < 1%)	2,052	7.18%	23,295	6.25%	717,212	5.41%
SLPP	1,688	5.91%	23,261	6.24%	6,924,255	52.25%
DUNF	586	2.05%	6,790	1.82%	34,537	0.26%
IND10	475	1.66%	6,845	1.84%	12,256	0.09%
Valid Votes	28,574	96.66%	372,913	97.07%	13,252,499	98.99%
Rejected Votes	988	3.34%	11,251	2.93%	135,452	1.01%
Total Polled	29,562	46.61%	384,164	68.00%	13,387,951	83.71%
Registered Electors	63,428		564,984		15,992,568	

=== 2015 Sri Lankan Presidential Election ===
Party	Kankesanthurai		Jaffna Electoral District		Sri Lanka	
Party	Votes	%	Votes	%	Votes	%
NDF	18,729	73.11%	253,574	74.42%	6,217,162	51.28%
UPFA	5,705	22.27%	74,454	21.85%	5,768,090	47.58%
Other Parties (with < 1%)	1,182	4.61%	12,723	3.73%	138,200	1.14%
Valid Votes	25,616	96.89%	340,751	97.14%	12,123,452	98.85%
Rejected Votes	822	3.11%	10,038	2.86%	140,925	1.15%
Total Polled	26,438	41.82%	350,789	64.22%	12,264,377	78.69%
Registered Electors	63,217		546,265		15,585,942	

=== 2010 Sri Lankan Presidential Election ===
Party	Kankesanthurai		Jaffna Electoral District		Sri Lanka	
Party	Votes	%	Votes	%	Votes	%
NDF	8,216	56.90%	113,877	63.84%	4,173,185	40.15%
UPFA	4,559	31.57%	44,154	24.75%	6,015,934	57.88%
Other Parties (with < 1%)	752	5.21%	9,128	5.12%	106,050	1.02%
UDF	283	1.96%	3,325	1.86%	23,290	0.22%
DUNF	254	1.76%	3,370	1.89%	39,226	0.38%
Ind 5	207	1.43%	3,205	1.80%	9,662	0.09%
JSP	169	1.17%	1,310	0.73%	26,266	0.25%
Valid Votes	14,440	96.70%	178,369	96.35%	10,393,613	99.03%
Rejected Votes	493	3.30%	6,763	3.65%	101,838	0.97%
Total Polled	14,933	21.62%	185,132	25.15%	10,495,451	66.70%
Registered Electors	69,082		736,032		15,734,587	

=== 2005 Sri Lankan Presidential Election ===
Party	Kankesanthurai		Jaffna Electoral District		Sri Lanka	
Party	Votes	%	Votes	%	Votes	%
UNP	148	56.92%	5,523	70.20%	4,706,366	48.43%
UPFA	97	37.31%	1,967	25.00%	4,887,152	50.29%
Other Parties (with < 1%)	9	3.46%	313	3.98%	87,201	0.90%
JSP	3	1.15%	34	0.43%	31,238	0.32%
DUA	3	1.15%	31	0.39%	5,082	0.05%
Valid Votes	260	97.38%	7,868	92.30%	9,717,039	98.88%
Rejected Votes	7	2.62%	656	7.70%	109,869	1.12%
Total Polled	267	0.40%	8,524	1.20%	9,826,908	69.51%
Registered Electors	67,133		707,970		14,136,979	

=== 1999 Sri Lankan Presidential Election ===
Party	Kankesanthurai		Jaffna Electoral District		Sri Lanka	
Party	Votes	%	Votes	%	Votes	%
PA	5,324	61.86%	52,043	46.65%	4,312,157	51.12%
UNP	2,271	26.39%	48,005	43.03%	3,602,748	42.71%
Other Parties (with < 1%)	265	3.08%	3,029	2.71%	391,588	4.64%
LDA	208	2.42%	3,394	3.04%	23,668	0.28%
Ind 2	197	2.29%	1,873	1.68%	27,052	0.32%
Liberal	158	1.84%	1,368	1.23%	25,085	0.30%
SMBP	93	1.08%	818	0.73%	35,854	0.43%
SLMP	90	1.05%	1,041	0.93%	17,359	0.21%
Valid Votes	8,606	96.40%	111,568	94.91%	8,435,754	97.69%
Rejected Votes	321	3.60%	5,981	5.09%	199,536	2.31%
Total Polled	8,927	14.51%	117,549	19.15%	8,635,290	72.17%
Registered Electors	61,514		613,718		11,965,536	

=== 1994 Sri Lankan Presidential Election ===
Party	Kankesanthurai		Jaffna Electoral District		Sri Lanka	
Party	Votes	%	Votes	%	Votes	%
PA	116	91.34%	16,934	96.35%	4,709,205	62.28%
UNP	6	4.72%	223	1.27%	2,715,283	35.91%
Ind 2	3	2.36%	341	1.94%	58,888	0.78%
Other Parties (with < 1%)	2	1.57%	77	0.44%	78,152	1.03%
Valid Votes	127	100.00%	17,575	99.20%	7,561,526	98.03%

=== 1988 Sri Lankan Presidential Election ===
Party	Kankesanthurai		Jaffna Electoral District		Sri Lanka	
Party	Votes	%	Votes	%	Votes	%
SLMP	3,840	41.20%	42,198	35.15%	235,701	4.63%
SLFP	3,117	33.44%	44,197	36.82%	2,289,857	44.95%
UNP	2,364	25.36%	33,650	28.03%	2,569,199	50.43%
Valid Votes	9,321	95.38%	120,045	93.38%	5,094,754	98.24%
Rejected Votes	451	4.62%	8,517	6.62%	91,499	1.76%
Total Polled	9,772	16.18%	128,562	23.30%	5,186,256	55.87%
Registered Electors	60,386		551,713		9,283,143	

=== 1982 Sri Lankan Presidential Election ===
Party	Kankesanthurai		Jaffna Electoral District		Sri Lanka	
Party	Votes	%	Votes	%	Votes	%
SLFP	9,523	47.16%	77,210	35.42%	2,546,348	39.05%
ACTC	6,065	30.03%	87,263	40.03%	173,934	2.67%
UNP	3,771	18.67%	44,775	20.54%	3,450,815	52.93%
JVP	341	1.69%	3,098	1.42%	273,428	4.19%
LSSP	310	1.54%	3,376	1.55%	58,531	0.90%
Other Parties (with < 1%)	184	0.91%	2,176	1.00%	16,995	0.26%
Valid Votes	20,194	94.93%	218,003	95.36%	6,520,156	98.78%
Rejected Votes	1,078	5.07%	10,610	4.64%	80,470	1.22%
Total Polled	21,272	41.16%	228,613	45.86%	6,600,626	80.15%
Registered Electors	51,681		498,545		8,235,358	

== Parliamentary Election Results ==
=== Summary ===
The winner of Kankesanthurai has matched the final country result 0 out of 7 times.

Year	Kankesanthurai	Jaffna Electoral District	MAE %	Sri Lanka	MAE %
2015	ITAK	ITAK	3.64%	UNP	34.78%
2010	ITAK	ITAK	2.86%	UPFA	21.42%
2004	ITAK	ITAK	4.02%	UPFA	5.88%
2001	TULF	TULF	1.32%	UNP	20.44%
2000	TULF	EPDP	6.20%	PA	15.39%
1994	IND2	IND2	4.55%	PA	0.27%
1989	INDI	INDI	6.73%	UNP	27.75%
Matches/Mean MAE	0/7	0/7	4.19%	7/7	17.99%

=== 2015 Sri Lankan Parliamentary Election ===
Party	Kankesanthurai		Jaffna Electoral District		Sri Lanka	
Party	Votes	%	Votes	%	Votes	%
ITAK	14,756	65.39%	207,577	70.08%	515,963	4.63%
EPDP	2,464	10.92%	30,232	10.21%	33,481	0.30%
UNP	2,064	9.15%	20,025	6.76%	5,098,916	45.77%
UPFA	1,656	7.34%	17,309	5.84%	4,732,664	42.48%
AITC	1,033	4.58%	15,022	5.07%	18,644	0.17%
IG0	307	1.36%	1,509	0.51%	14,927	0.13%
Other Parties (with < 1%)	286	1.27%	4,525	1.53%	565,549	5.08%
Valid Votes	22,566	90.98%	296,199	90.91%	11,140,333	95.35%
Rejected Votes	1,964	7.92%	25,496	7.83%	516,926	4.42%
Total Polled	24,804	39.24%	325,805	61.56%	11,684,111	77.66%
Registered Electors	63,217		529,239		15,044,490	

=== 2010 Sri Lankan Parliamentary Election ===
Party	Kankesanthurai		Jaffna Electoral District		Sri Lanka	
Party	Votes	%	Votes	%	Votes	%
ITAK	5,018	43.52%	65,119	44.03%	233,190	2.91%
UPFA	4,518	39.18%	47,622	32.20%	4,846,388	60.38%
UNP	584	5.06%	12,624	8.54%	2,357,057	29.37%
Other Parties (with < 1%)	384	3.33%	7,442	5.03%	480,950	5.99%
AITC	337	2.92%	6,362	4.30%	7,544	0.09%
IG1J	209	1.81%	2,648	1.79%	2,648	0.03%
TULF	169	1.47%	2,892	1.96%	9,223	0.11%
IG6J	168	1.46%	1,038	0.70%	1,038	0.01%
IG4J	144	1.25%	2,151	1.45%	2,151	0.03%
Valid Votes	11,531	87.56%	147,898	87.89%	8,026,322	96.03%
Rejected Votes	1,621	12.31%	19,774	11.75%	581,465	6.96%
Total Polled	13,170	19.06%	168,277	22.68%	8,358,246	59.29%
Registered Electors	69,082		742,005		14,097,690	

=== 2004 Sri Lankan Parliamentary Election ===
Party	Kankesanthurai		Jaffna Electoral District		Sri Lanka	
Party	Votes	%	Votes	%	Votes	%
ITAK	18,499	86.50%	257,320	90.60%	633,203	6.85%
EPDP	2,395	11.20%	18,612	6.55%	24,942	0.27%
IP1D	405	1.89%	5,156	1.82%	6,121	0.07%
Other Parties (with < 1%)	87	0.41%	2,938	1.03%	764,786	8.28%
Valid Votes	21,386	92.91%	284,026	93.04%	9,241,931	94.52%
Rejected Votes	1,631	7.09%	21,233	6.96%	534,452	5.47%
Total Polled	23,017	35.72%	305,259	46.65%	9,777,821	75.74%
Registered Electors	64,434		654,415		12,909,631	

=== 2001 Sri Lankan Parliamentary Election ===
Party	Kankesanthurai		Jaffna Electoral District		Sri Lanka	
Party	Votes	%	Votes	%	Votes	%
TULF	8,898	54.72%	102,324	54.84%	348,164	3.89%
EPDP	5,580	34.32%	57,208	30.66%	72,783	0.81%
UNP	1,231	7.57%	16,245	8.71%	4,086,026	45.62%
Other Parties (with < 1%)	317	1.95%	8,144	4.36%	1,049,603	11.72%
INDP	234	1.44%	2,677	1.43%	2,900	0.03%
Valid Votes	16,260	94.76%	186,598	94.59%	8,955,844	94.77%
Rejected Votes	899	5.24%	10,681	5.41%	494,009	5.23%
Total Polled	17,159	26.76%	197,279	31.14%	9,449,878	76.03%
Registered Electors	64,119		633,457		12,428,762	

=== 2000 Sri Lankan Parliamentary Election ===
Party	Kankesanthurai		Jaffna Electoral District		Sri Lanka	
Party	Votes	%	Votes	%	Votes	%
TULF	4,943	44.92%	32,761	28.50%	105,907	1.23%
EPDP	4,068	36.97%	41,536	36.13%	50,702	0.59%
UNP	524	4.76%	10,896	9.48%	3,451,765	40.12%
ACTC	331	3.01%	10,618	9.24%	27,289	0.32%
IG2	304	2.76%	4,905	4.27%	31,443	0.37%
DPLF	254	2.31%	4,778	4.16%	20,655	0.24%
Other Parties (with < 1%)	254	2.31%	5,334	4.64%	886,991	10.31%
IG1	174	1.58%	1,641	1.43%	9,799	0.11%
L&DA	152	1.38%	2,502	2.18%	9,781	0.11%
Valid Votes	11,004	N/A	114,971	N/A	8,602,617	N/A

=== 1994 Sri Lankan Parliamentary Election ===
Party	Kankesanthurai		Jaffna Electoral District		Sri Lanka	
Party	Votes	%	Votes	%	Votes	%
IND2	93	76.86%	10,744	79.71%	16,690	0.21%
IND1	15	12.40%	374	2.77%	48,199	0.61%
EPRLF	9	7.44%	263	1.95%	9,411	0.12%
SLMC	4	3.31%	2,098	15.56%	143,307	1.80%
Valid Votes	121	95.28%	13,479	97.41%	7,943,688	95.20%
Rejected Votes	6	4.72%	358	2.59%	400,395	4.80%
Total Polled	127	0.21%	13,837	2.32%	8,344,095	74.75%
Registered Electors	60,417		596,375		11,163,064	

=== 1989 Sri Lankan Parliamentary Election ===
Party	Kankesanthurai		Jaffna Electoral District		Sri Lanka	
Party	Votes	%	Votes	%	Votes	%
INDI	14,801	55.87%	150,340	62.68%	175,579	3.14%
TULF	9,073	34.25%	60,013	25.02%	188,594	3.37%
DPLF	1,199	4.53%	7,993	3.33%	19,150	0.34%
ACTC	532	2.01%	7,610	3.17%	7,610	0.14%
SLMC	500	1.89%	8,439	3.52%	202,016	3.61%
UNP	388	1.46%	5,460	2.28%	2,838,005	50.71%
Valid Votes	26,493	90.39%	239,855	90.49%	5,596,468	93.87%
Rejected Votes	2,817	9.61%	25,203	9.51%	365,563	6.13%
Total Polled	29,310	48.62%	265,058	44.76%	5,962,031	63.60%
Registered Electors	60,282		592,210		9,374,164	

== Demographics ==
=== Ethnicity ===
The Kankesanthurai Polling Division has a Sri Lankan Tamil majority (98.8%) . In comparison, the Jaffna Electoral District (which contains the Kankesanthurai Polling Division) has a Sri Lankan Tamil majority (98.6%)

Ethnicity in Kankesanthurai
1. Sri Lankan Tamil (98.8%)
2. Other (1.20%)

=== Religion ===
The Kankesanthurai Polling Division has a Hindu majority (87.5%) . In comparison, the Jaffna Electoral District (which contains the Kankesanthurai Polling Division) has a Hindu majority (82.6%) and a significant Roman Catholic population (12.6%)

Religion in Kankesanthurai
1. Hindu (87.5%)
2. Roman Catholic (7.70%)
3. Other Christian (3.90%)
4. Other (0.90%)
