= Silvestri Alantine =

Member of the Parliament of Sri Lanka

Hon. Silvestri Alantine MP

Member of Parliament for Jaffna District
- In office 2010–2015
- Succeeded by: ex parliament member

Personal details
- Party: Eelam People's Democratic Party
- Other political affiliations: United People's Freedom Alliance
- Ethnicity: Sri Lankan Tamil

Silvestri Alantine alias Uthayan is a Sri Lankan politician. He was a member of the Sri Lankan Parliament from Jaffna District as a member of the paramilitary Eelam People's Democratic Party. However, he contested under the symbol of United People's Freedom Alliance
