= K. Navaratnam =

Sri Lankan Tamil politician

Hon. K. Navaratnam MP

Member of Parliament for Jaffna District
- In office 1989–1994

Personal details
- Born: 2 January 1935 (age 91)
- Party: Eelam People's Revolutionary Liberation Front
- Ethnicity: Sri Lankan Tamil

Kandiah Navaratnam (born 2 January 1935) is a Sri Lankan Tamil politician and former Member of Parliament.

Navaratnam was born on 2 January 1935. He was educated at Jaffna Hindu College. He is a Hindu.

Navaratnam contested the 1989 parliamentary election as one of the Eelam People's Revolutionary Liberation Front's candidates in Jaffna District and was elected to Parliament.
