= Manipay Polling Division =

Manipay
- Polling Division
- Interactive map of Manipay
- Coordinates: 9.746417°N 79.978796°E
- Country: Sri Lanka
- Province: Northern Province, Sri Lanka
- Electoral District: Jaffna Electoral District

Area
  - Total: 52.07 km^{2} (20.10 sq mi)

Population (2012)
  - Total: 52,269
  - Density: 1,004/km^{2} (2,600/sq mi)
- ISO 3166 code: EC-10D

The Manipay Polling Division is a Polling Division in the Jaffna Electoral District, in the Northern Province, Sri Lanka.

== Presidential Election Results ==
=== Summary ===
The winner of Manipay has matched the final country result 3 out of 8 times.

Year	Manipay	Jaffna Electoral District	MAE %	Sri Lanka	MAE %
2019	NDF	NDF	0.79%	SLPP	42.71%
2015	NDF	NDF	1.28%	NDF	25.50%
2010	NDF	NDF	1.66%	UPFA	26.88%
2005	UNP	UNP	5.17%	UPFA	28.85%
1999	PA	PA	10.39%	PA	8.61%
1994	PA	PA	3.57%	PA	36.40%
1988	SLMP	SLFP	6.26%	UNP	18.77%
1982	SLFP	ACTC	4.44%	UNP	18.85%
Matches/Mean MAE	3/8	3/8	4.20%	8/8	25.82%

=== 2019 Sri Lankan Presidential Election ===
Party	Manipay		Jaffna Electoral District		Sri Lanka	
Party	Votes	%	Votes	%	Votes	%
NDF	31,369	84.69%	312,722	83.86%	5,564,239	41.99%
Other Parties (with < 1%)	2,486	6.71%	23,295	6.25%	717,212	5.41%
SLPP	1,859	5.02%	23,261	6.24%	6,924,255	52.25%
DUNF	790	2.13%	6,790	1.82%	34,537	0.26%
IND10	534	1.44%	6,845	1.84%	12,256	0.09%
Valid Votes	37,038	96.84%	372,913	97.07%	13,252,499	98.99%
Rejected Votes	1,210	3.16%	11,251	2.93%	135,452	1.01%
Total Polled	38,248	68.57%	384,164	68.00%	13,387,951	83.71%
Registered Electors	55,783		564,984		15,992,568	

=== 2015 Sri Lankan Presidential Election ===
Party	Manipay		Jaffna Electoral District		Sri Lanka	
Party	Votes	%	Votes	%	Votes	%
NDF	26,958	75.67%	253,574	74.42%	6,217,162	51.28%
UPFA	7,225	20.28%	74,454	21.85%	5,768,090	47.58%
Other Parties (with < 1%)	1,444	4.05%	12,723	3.73%	138,200	1.14%
Valid Votes	35,627	97.38%	340,751	97.14%	12,123,452	98.85%
Rejected Votes	960	2.62%	10,038	2.86%	140,925	1.15%
Total Polled	36,587	67.05%	350,789	64.22%	12,264,377	78.69%
Registered Electors	54,567		546,265		15,585,942	

=== 2010 Sri Lankan Presidential Election ===
Party	Manipay		Jaffna Electoral District		Sri Lanka	
Party	Votes	%	Votes	%	Votes	%
NDF	13,390	62.01%	113,877	63.84%	4,173,185	40.15%
UPFA	5,749	26.62%	44,154	24.75%	6,015,934	57.88%
Other Parties (with < 1%)	1,386	6.42%	10,438	5.85%	132,316	1.27%
UDF	447	2.07%	3,325	1.86%	23,290	0.22%
DUNF	391	1.81%	3,370	1.89%	39,226	0.38%
Ind 5	231	1.07%	3,205	1.80%	9,662	0.09%
Valid Votes	21,594	96.08%	178,369	96.35%	10,393,613	99.03%
Rejected Votes	881	3.92%	6,763	3.65%	101,838	0.97%
Total Polled	22,475	31.60%	185,132	25.15%	10,495,451	66.70%
Registered Electors	71,114		736,032		15,734,587	

=== 2005 Sri Lankan Presidential Election ===
Party	Manipay		Jaffna Electoral District		Sri Lanka	
Party	Votes	%	Votes	%	Votes	%
UNP	256	75.29%	5,523	70.20%	4,706,366	48.43%
UPFA	64	18.82%	1,967	25.00%	4,887,152	50.29%
USP	11	3.24%	72	0.92%	35,425	0.36%
Other Parties (with < 1%)	9	2.65%	306	3.89%	88,096	0.91%
Valid Votes	340	95.24%	7,868	92.30%	9,717,039	98.88%
Rejected Votes	17	4.76%	656	7.70%	109,869	1.12%
Total Polled	357	0.52%	8,524	1.20%	9,826,908	69.51%
Registered Electors	68,783		707,970		14,136,979	

=== 1999 Sri Lankan Presidential Election ===
Party	Manipay		Jaffna Electoral District		Sri Lanka	
Party	Votes	%	Votes	%	Votes	%
PA	9,194	58.59%	52,043	46.65%	4,312,157	51.12%
UNP	5,003	31.88%	48,005	43.03%	3,602,748	42.71%
Other Parties (with < 1%)	606	3.86%	4,888	4.38%	444,801	5.27%
LDA	386	2.46%	3,394	3.04%	23,668	0.28%
Ind 2	311	1.98%	1,873	1.68%	27,052	0.32%
Liberal	191	1.22%	1,368	1.23%	25,085	0.30%
Valid Votes	15,691	95.65%	111,568	94.91%	8,435,754	97.69%
Rejected Votes	714	4.35%	5,981	5.09%	199,536	2.31%
Total Polled	16,405	26.46%	117,549	19.15%	8,635,290	72.17%
Registered Electors	62,002		613,718		11,965,536	

=== 1994 Sri Lankan Presidential Election ===
Party	Manipay		Jaffna Electoral District		Sri Lanka	
Party	Votes	%	Votes	%	Votes	%
PA	18	100.00%	16,934	96.35%	4,709,205	62.28%
Valid Votes	18	100.00%	17,575	99.20%	7,561,526	98.03%

=== 1988 Sri Lankan Presidential Election ===
Party	Manipay		Jaffna Electoral District		Sri Lanka	
Party	Votes	%	Votes	%	Votes	%
SLMP	5,089	40.43%	42,198	35.15%	235,701	4.63%
UNP	4,006	31.83%	33,650	28.03%	2,569,199	50.43%
SLFP	3,491	27.74%	44,197	36.82%	2,289,857	44.95%
Valid Votes	12,586	93.39%	120,045	93.38%	5,094,754	98.24%
Rejected Votes	891	6.61%	8,517	6.62%	91,499	1.76%
Total Polled	13,477	23.11%	128,562	23.30%	5,186,256	55.87%
Registered Electors	58,320		551,713		9,283,143	

=== 1982 Sri Lankan Presidential Election ===
Party	Manipay		Jaffna Electoral District		Sri Lanka	
Party	Votes	%	Votes	%	Votes	%
SLFP	9,008	40.34%	77,210	35.42%	2,546,348	39.05%
ACTC	7,514	33.65%	87,263	40.03%	173,934	2.67%
UNP	4,463	19.99%	44,775	20.54%	3,450,815	52.93%
JVP	559	2.50%	3,098	1.42%	273,428	4.19%
LSSP	483	2.16%	3,376	1.55%	58,531	0.90%
NSSP	298	1.33%	2,176	1.00%	16,995	0.26%
Valid Votes	22,330	95.43%	218,003	95.36%	6,520,156	98.78%
Rejected Votes	1,069	4.57%	10,610	4.64%	80,470	1.22%
Total Polled	23,399	47.82%	228,613	45.86%	6,600,626	80.15%
Registered Electors	48,930		498,545		8,235,358	

== Parliamentary Election Results ==
=== Summary ===
The winner of Manipay has matched the final country result 0 out of 7 times.

Year	Manipay	Jaffna Electoral District	MAE %	Sri Lanka	MAE %
2015	ITAK	ITAK	0.82%	UNP	35.08%
2010	ITAK	ITAK	1.02%	UPFA	23.56%
2004	ITAK	ITAK	5.93%	UPFA	5.74%
2001	TULF	TULF	1.10%	UNP	20.14%
2000	EPDP	EPDP	3.08%	PA	14.91%
1994	IND1	IND2	41.20%	PA	0.50%
1989	INDI	INDI	3.90%	UNP	27.52%
Matches/Mean MAE	0/7	0/7	8.15%	7/7	18.21%

=== 2015 Sri Lankan Parliamentary Election ===
Party	Manipay		Jaffna Electoral District		Sri Lanka	
Party	Votes	%	Votes	%	Votes	%
ITAK	20,875	69.70%	207,577	70.08%	515,963	4.63%
UNP	2,888	9.64%	20,025	6.76%	5,098,916	45.77%
EPDP	2,129	7.11%	30,232	10.21%	33,481	0.30%
UPFA	1,959	6.54%	17,309	5.84%	4,732,664	42.48%
AITC	1,498	5.00%	15,022	5.07%	18,644	0.17%
Other Parties (with < 1%)	599	2.00%	6,034	2.04%	580,476	5.21%
Valid Votes	29,948	89.44%	296,199	90.91%	11,140,333	95.35%
Rejected Votes	2,623	7.83%	25,496	7.83%	516,926	4.42%
Total Polled	33,485	61.36%	325,805	61.56%	11,684,111	77.66%
Registered Electors	54,567		529,239		15,044,490	

=== 2010 Sri Lankan Parliamentary Election ===
Party	Manipay		Jaffna Electoral District		Sri Lanka	
Party	Votes	%	Votes	%	Votes	%
ITAK	7,194	43.25%	65,119	44.03%	233,190	2.91%
UPFA	5,643	33.93%	47,622	32.20%	4,846,388	60.38%
UNP	1,424	8.56%	12,624	8.54%	2,357,057	29.37%
Other Parties (with < 1%)	597	3.59%	6,659	4.50%	479,888	5.98%
TULF	473	2.84%	2,892	1.96%	9,223	0.11%
AITC	397	2.39%	6,362	4.30%	7,544	0.09%
IG4J	332	2.00%	2,151	1.45%	2,151	0.03%
IG1J	305	1.83%	2,648	1.79%	2,648	0.03%
PERLF	268	1.61%	1,821	1.23%	2,100	0.03%
Valid Votes	16,633	87.92%	147,898	87.89%	8,026,322	96.03%
Rejected Votes	2,239	11.84%	19,774	11.75%	581,465	6.96%
Total Polled	18,918	26.60%	168,277	22.68%	8,358,246	59.29%
Registered Electors	71,114		742,005		14,097,690	

=== 2004 Sri Lankan Parliamentary Election ===
Party	Manipay		Jaffna Electoral District		Sri Lanka	
Party	Votes	%	Votes	%	Votes	%
ITAK	23,779	84.45%	257,320	90.60%	633,203	6.85%
EPDP	3,239	11.50%	18,612	6.55%	24,942	0.27%
IP1D	980	3.48%	5,156	1.82%	6,121	0.07%
Other Parties (with < 1%)	160	0.57%	2,938	1.03%	764,786	8.28%
Valid Votes	28,158	92.55%	284,026	93.04%	9,241,931	94.52%
Rejected Votes	2,268	7.45%	21,233	6.96%	534,452	5.47%
Total Polled	30,426	46.65%	305,259	46.65%	9,777,821	75.74%
Registered Electors	65,218		654,415		12,909,631	

=== 2001 Sri Lankan Parliamentary Election ===
Party	Manipay		Jaffna Electoral District		Sri Lanka	
Party	Votes	%	Votes	%	Votes	%
TULF	13,539	56.49%	102,324	54.84%	348,164	3.89%
EPDP	7,450	31.08%	57,208	30.66%	72,783	0.81%
UNP	1,999	8.34%	16,245	8.71%	4,086,026	45.62%
Other Parties (with < 1%)	632	2.64%	8,144	4.36%	1,049,603	11.72%
INDP	349	1.46%	2,677	1.43%	2,900	0.03%
Valid Votes	23,969	94.59%	186,598	94.59%	8,955,844	94.77%
Rejected Votes	1,370	5.41%	10,681	5.41%	494,009	5.23%
Total Polled	25,339	39.43%	197,279	31.14%	9,449,878	76.03%
Registered Electors	64,262		633,457		12,428,762	

=== 2000 Sri Lankan Parliamentary Election ===
Party	Manipay		Jaffna Electoral District		Sri Lanka	
Party	Votes	%	Votes	%	Votes	%
EPDP	5,737	33.92%	41,536	36.13%	50,702	0.59%
TULF	5,703	33.72%	32,761	28.50%	105,907	1.23%
ACTC	1,160	6.86%	10,618	9.24%	27,289	0.32%
DPLF	1,067	6.31%	4,778	4.16%	20,655	0.24%
UNP	955	5.65%	10,896	9.48%	3,451,765	40.12%
IG2	872	5.16%	4,905	4.27%	31,443	0.37%
IG1	634	3.75%	1,641	1.43%	9,799	0.11%
Other Parties (with < 1%)	528	3.12%	6,203	5.40%	890,663	10.35%
IG3	256	1.51%	1,633	1.42%	6,109	0.07%
Valid Votes	16,912	N/A	114,971	N/A	8,602,617	N/A

=== 1994 Sri Lankan Parliamentary Election ===
Party	Manipay		Jaffna Electoral District		Sri Lanka	
Party	Votes	%	Votes	%	Votes	%
IND1	8	66.67%	374	2.77%	48,199	0.61%
IND2	4	33.33%	10,744	79.71%	16,690	0.21%
Valid Votes	12	92.31%	13,479	97.41%	7,943,688	95.20%
Rejected Votes	1	7.69%	358	2.59%	400,395	4.80%
Total Polled	13	0.02%	13,837	2.32%	8,344,095	74.75%
Registered Electors	58,382		596,375		11,163,064	

=== 1989 Sri Lankan Parliamentary Election ===
Party	Manipay		Jaffna Electoral District		Sri Lanka	
Party	Votes	%	Votes	%	Votes	%
INDI	18,521	67.49%	150,340	62.68%	175,579	3.14%
TULF	6,048	22.04%	60,013	25.02%	188,594	3.37%
DPLF	1,252	4.56%	7,993	3.33%	19,150	0.34%
SLMC	592	2.16%	8,439	3.52%	202,016	3.61%
ACTC	535	1.95%	7,610	3.17%	7,610	0.14%
UNP	496	1.81%	5,460	2.28%	2,838,005	50.71%
Valid Votes	27,444	91.80%	239,855	90.49%	5,596,468	93.87%
Rejected Votes	2,453	8.20%	25,203	9.51%	365,563	6.13%
Total Polled	29,897	51.40%	265,058	44.76%	5,962,031	63.60%
Registered Electors	58,166		592,210		9,374,164	

== Demographics ==
=== Ethnicity ===
The Manipay Polling Division has a Sri Lankan Tamil majority (99.3%) . In comparison, the Jaffna Electoral District (which contains the Manipay Polling Division) has a Sri Lankan Tamil majority (98.6%)

Ethnicity in Manipay
1. Sri Lankan Tamil (99.3%)
2. Other (0.70%)

=== Religion ===
The Manipay Polling Division has a Hindu majority (75.1%) and a significant Roman Catholic population (20.3%) . In comparison, the Jaffna Electoral District (which contains the Manipay Polling Division) has a Hindu majority (82.6%) and a significant Roman Catholic population (12.6%)

Religion in Manipay
1. Hindu (75.1%)
2. Roman Catholic (20.3%)
3. Other Christian (4.20%)
4. Other (0.30%)
