= Karunananthan Ilankumaran =

Sri Lankan politician

Hon. Karunananthan Ilankumaran MP

Member of Parliament for Jaffna Electoral District
- Incumbent
- Assumed office 15 November 2024
- Majority: 32,102

Personal details
- Born: 29 May 1990 (age 35)
- Party: National People's Power
- Profession: Politician

Karunananthan Ilankumaran is a Sri Lankan Tamil politician. He was elected to the Sri Lankan Parliament from Jaffna Electoral District as a member of the National People's Power.
