= Jaffna Electoral District =

Electoral district of Sri Lanka

Jaffna
- Electoral District for the Parliament of Sri Lanka
- Administrative District: Jaffna; Kilinochchi
- Province: Northern
- Polling divisions: 11
- Population: 696,253 (2011)
- Electorate: 529,239 (2014)

Current Electoral District
- Created: 1978
- Seats: 11 (1989–94); 10 (1994–00); 9 (2000–2024); 6 (2024–present)
- MPs: NPP (3) Karunananthan Ilankumaran; Sri Bhavanandaraja Shanmuganathan; Rajeewan Jayachandramurthy ITAK (1) S. Sritharan ACTC (1) Gajendrakumar Ponnambalam IND (1) Ramanathan Archuna
- Provincial Council: Northern
- Created from: Chavakachcheri; Jaffna; Kankesanthurai; Kayts; Kilinochchi; Kopay; Manipay; Nallur; Point Pedro; Udupiddy; Vaddukoddai

Jaffna Electoral District is one of the 22 multi-member electoral districts of Sri Lanka created by the 1978 Constitution of Sri Lanka. The district covers the administrative districts of Jaffna and Kilinochchi in the Northern province. The district currently elects 9 of the 225 members of the Sri Lankan Parliament and had 529,239 registered electors in 2014. The district is Sri Lanka's Electorate Number 10.

== Polling divisions ==
The Jaffna Electoral District consists of the following polling divisions:

A: Kayts

B: Vaddukoddai

C: Kankesanthurai

D: Manipay

E: Kopay

F: Udupiddy

G: Point Pedro

H: Chavakachcheri

I: Nallur

J: Jaffna

K: Kilinochchi

== Election results ==
=== Presidential elections ===
==== 1982 presidential election ====
Results of the 1st presidential election held on 20 October 1982:

Candidate	Party	Votes per Polling Division											Postal Votes	Total Votes	%
Candidate	Party	Chavaka -chcheri	Jaffna	Kankesan -thurai	Kayts	Kilino -chchi	Kopay	Manipay	Nallur	Point Pedro	Udu- piddy	Vaddu -koddai	Postal Votes	Total Votes	%
Kumar Ponnambalam	ACTC	9,742	9,319	6,065	8,353	9,822	4,984	7,514	8,979	5,367	5,779	9,741	1,598	87,263	40.03%
Hector Kobbekaduwa	SLFP	6,128	3,258	9,523	3,393	4,188	13,678	9,008	4,330	6,348	8,155	7,770	1,431	77,300	35.46%
J. R. Jayewardene	UNP	3,629	6,419	3,771	4,067	3,616	3,546	4,463	4,831	3,198	2,282	3,700	1,253	44,780	20.54%
Colvin R. de Silva	LSSP	419	134	310	157	171	423	483	332	217	353	257	120	3,376	1.55%
Rohana Wijeweera	JVP	204	176	341	119	188	379	559	244	189	208	380	111	3,098	1.42%
Vasudeva Nanayakkara	NSSP	125	186	184	98	102	182	298	243	150	224	255	129	2,186	1.00%
Valid Votes		20,247	19,502	20,194	16,187	18,087	23,282	22,330	18,959	15,469	17,001	22,103	4,642	218,003	100.00%
Rejected Votes		1,205	711	1.078	943	1,012	1,023	1,069	894	585	816	1,076	198	10,610	
Total Polled		21,452	20,213	21,272	17,130	19,099	24,305	23,399	19,853	16,054	17,817	23,179	4,840	228,613	
Registered Electors		44,597	42,296	51,681	42,563	39,773	49,577	48,930	49,233	34,859	43,990	46,206		493,705	
Turnout (%)		48.10%	47.79%	41.16%	40.25%	48.02%	49.02%	47.82%	40.32%	46.05%	40.50%	50.16%		46.31%	

==== 1988 presidential election ====
Results of the 2nd presidential election held on 19 December 1988:

Candidate	Party	Votes per Polling Division											Total Votes	%
Candidate	Party	Chavaka -chcheri	Jaffna	Kankesan -thurai	Kayts	Kilino -chchi	Kopay	Manipay	Nallur	Point Pedro	Udu- piddy	Vaddu -koddai	Total Votes	%
Sirimavo Bandaranaike	SLFP	3,704	3,546	3,117	3,264	4,064	5,833	3,491	3,362	3,921	3,400	6,495	44,197	36.82%
Ossie Abeygunasekera	SLMP	4,023	3,616	3,840	4,503	2,596	4,325	5,089	2,924	2,910	3,120	5,252	42,198	35.15%
Ranasinghe Premadasa	UNP	2,300	3,475	2,364	4,628	3,793	2,493	4,006	2,000	2,620	1,662	4,309	33,650	28.03%
Valid Votes		10,027	10,637	9,321	12,395	10,453	12,651	12,586	8,286	9,451	8,182	16,056	120,045	100.00%
Rejected Votes		1,035	479	451	596	378	733	891	482	772	303	2,397	8,517	
Total Polled		11,062	11,116	9,772	12,991	10,831	13,384	13,477	8,768	10,223	8,485	18,453	128,562	
Registered Electors		51,595	49,229	60,386	49,481	53,604	56,450	58,320	61,936	40,175	52,084	58,522	591,782	
Turnout (%)		21.44%	22.58%	16.18%	26.25%	20.21%	23.71%	23.11%	14.16%	25.45%	16.29%	31.53%	21.72%	

==== 1994 presidential election ====
Results of the 3rd presidential election held on 9 November 1994:

Candidate	Party	Votes per Polling Division											Postal Votes	Total Votes	%
Candidate	Party	Chavaka -chcheri	Jaffna	Kankesan -thurai	Kayts	Kilino -chchi	Kopay	Manipay	Nallur	Point Pedro	Udu- piddy	Vaddu -koddai	Postal Votes	Total Votes	%
Chandrika Kumaratunga	PA	63	1,143	116	14,761	174	11	18	21	8	24	539	56	16,934	96.35%
Hudson Samarasinghe	Ind 2	1	15	3	291	0	0	0	0	0	00	31	0	341	1.94%
Srimathi Dissanayake	UNP	6	108	6	83	9	1	0	2	0	2	6	0	223	1.27%
Harischandra Wijayatunga	SMBP	0	1	1	27	1	0	0	0	0	0	6	0	36	0.20%
G. A. Nihal	SLPF	0	4	0	17	2	0	0	0	0	0	2	0	25	0.14%
A. J. Ranashinge	Ind 1	0	1	1	14	0	0	0	0	0	0	0	0	16	0.09%
Valid Votes		70	1,272	127	15,193	186	12	18	23	8	26	584	56	17,575	100.00%
Rejected Votes		3	7	0	120	7	0	0	0	0	0	4	0	141	
Total Polled		73	1,279	127	15,313	193	12	18	23	8	26	588	56	17,716	
Registered Electors		51,717	50,045	60,417	49,504	55,995	56,496	58,382	62,372	40,336	52,153	58,949	62	596,366	
Turnout (%)		0.14%	2.56%	0.21%	30.93%	0.34%	0.02%	0.03%	0.04%	0.02%	0.05%	1.00%	90.32%	2.97%	

==== 1999 presidential election ====
Results of the 4th presidential election held on 21 December 1999:

Candidate	Party	Votes per Polling Division											Postal Votes	Total Votes	%
Candidate	Party	Chavaka -chcheri	Jaffna	Kankesan -thurai	Kayts	Kilino -chchi	Kopay	Manipay	Nallur	Point Pedro	Udu- piddy	Vaddu -koddai	Postal Votes	Total Votes	%
Chandrika Kumaratunga	PA	3,430	3,471	5,324	3,377	593	6,607	9,194	5,125	3,062	4,664	6,854	342	52,043	46.65%
Ranil Wickremasinghe	UNP	7,494	3,263	2,271	3,580	1,262	5,941	5,003	4,834	4,270	5,685	4,232	170	48,005	43.03%
Vasudeva Nanayakkara	LDA	356	151	208	154	33	332	386	328	258	417	466	305	3,394	3.04%
W. V. M. Ranjith	Ind 2	127	57	197	108	26	335	311	113	95	210	293	1	1,873	1.68%
Rajiva Wijesinha	Liberal	109	28	158	62	22	265	191	95	72	138	228	0	1,368	1.23%
Abdul Rasool	SLMP	158	46	90	84	31	161	126	47	80	88	125	5	1,041	0.93%
T. Edirisuriya	Ind 1	84	25	81	45	11	122	104	49	65	118	127	0	831	0.74%
Harischandra Wijayatunga	SMBP	77	22	93	40	12	133	115	54	58	72	139	3	818	0.73%
Hudson Samarasinghe	Ind 3	51	10	49	31	6	111	55	41	32	88	77	1	552	0.49%
Kamal Karunadasa	PLSF	33	14	58	34	3	84	73	29	34	53	71	1	487	0.44%
Nandana Gunathilake	JVP	68	11	24	50	6	49	57	18	33	44	53	0	413	0.37%
A. W. Premawardhana	PFF	62	7	25	32	3	78	40	24	31	51	49	1	403	0.36%
A. Dissanayaka	DUNF	49	8	28	20	8	55	36	21	28	41	49	0	340	0.30%
Valid Votes		12,098	7,113	8,606	7,617	2,016	14,273	15,691	10,778	8,118	11,669	12,760	829	111,568	100.00%
Rejected Votes		1,059	314	321	419	117	577	714	384	453	737	767	119	5,981	
Total Polled		13,157	7,427	8,927	8,036	2,133	14,850	16,405	11,162	8,571	12,406	13,527	948	117,549	
Registered Electors		53,247	51,581	61,514	50,885	56,792	58,751	62,002	63,799	42,304	53,545	58,350		612,770	
Turnout (%)		24.71%	14.40%	14.51%	15.79%	3.76%	25.28%	26.46%	17.50%	20.26%	23.17%	23.18%		19.18%	

==== 2005 presidential election ====
Results of the 5th presidential election held on 17 November 2005:

Candidate	Party	Votes per Polling Division											Postal Votes	Displaced Votes	Total Votes	%
Candidate	Party	Chavaka -chcheri	Jaffna	Kankesan -thurai	Kayts	Kilino -chchi	Kopay	Manipay	Nallur	Point Pedro	Udu- piddy	Vaddu -koddai	Postal Votes	Displaced Votes	Total Votes	%
Ranil Wickremasinghe	UNP	33	301	148	98	1	267	256	198	25	52	191	1,405	2,548	5,523	70.20%
Mahinda Rajapaksa	UPFA	10	124	97	139	0	54	64	100	9	11	53	327	979	1,967	25.00%
Victor Hettigoda	ULPP	0	3	0	3	0	1	0	2	0	1	0	109	1	120	1.53%
Siritunga Jayasuriya	USP	2	4	2	3	0	14	11	2	0	0	3	5	26	72	0.92%
A. A. Suraweera	NDF	0	2	3	3	0	5	1	1	0	0	3	4	12	34	0.43%
A. K. J. Arachchige	DUA	1	1	3	4	0	2	3	4	0	0	0	3	10	31	0.39%
Wije Dias	SEP	1	1	0	10	0	1	0	0	0	0	2	10	4	29	0.37%
Chamil Jayaneththi	NLF	2	1	2	2	0	5	1	0	1	0	2	7	1	24	0.31%
Anura De Silva	ULF	0	0	2	1	0	4	3	1	0	0	1	3	6	21	0.27%
P. Nelson Perera	SLPF	0	1	1	0	0	2	1	0	0	0	3	4	4	16	0.20%
Wimal Geeganage	SLNF	1	0	0	0	0	4	0	0	0	0	2	4	4	15	0.19%
Aruna de Soyza	RPP	0	0	2	0	0	3	0	0	0	0	3	2	2	12	0.15%
H. S. Dharmadwaja	UNAF	0	0	0	0	0	0	0	0	0	0	0	2	2	4	0.05%
Valid Votes		50	438	260	263	1	362	340	308	35	64	263	1,885	3,599	7,868	100.00%
Rejected Votes		3	17	7	13	0	26	17	5	4	1	15	441	107	656	
Total Polled		53	455	267	276	1	388	357	313	39	65	278	2,326	3,706	8,524	
Registered Electors		62,022	62,089	67,133	52,986	89,454	63,752	68,783	70,251	47,188	55,499	62,781			701,938	
Turnout (%)		0.08%	0.73%	0.40%	0.52%	0.00%	0.61%	0.52%	0.45%	0.08%	0.12%	0.44%			1.21%	

==== 2010 presidential election ====
Results of the 6th presidential election held on 26 January 2010:

Candidate	Party	Votes per Polling Division											Postal Votes	Displaced Votes	Total Votes	%
Candidate	Party	Chavaka -chcheri	Jaffna	Kankesan -thurai	Kayts	Kilino -chchi	Kopay	Manipay	Nallur	Point Pedro	Udu- piddy	Vaddu -koddai	Postal Votes	Displaced Votes	Total Votes	%
Sarath Fonseka	NDF	11,599	7,914	8,216	3,976	4,717	13,151	13,390	11,543	8,585	8,974	11,712	3,173	6,927	113,877	63.84%
Mahinda Rajapaksa	UPFA	4,567	3,296	4,559	4,611	991	4,538	5,749	3,554	2,361	2,545	4,247	892	2,244	44,154	24.75%
M. C. M. Ismail	DUNF	323	107	254	283	199	528	391	196	223	301	326	6	233	3,370	1.89%
C. J. Sugathsiri Gamage	UDF	493	139	283	144	45	471	447	231	227	314	486	4	41	3,325	1.86%
M. K. Shivajilingam	Ind 5	348	126	207	284	42	306	231	173	326	334	500	263	65	3,205	1.80%
A. A. Suraweera	NDF	141	50	169	136	28	160	189	73	73	97	164	2	28	1,310	0.73%
Vikramabahu Karunaratne	LF	121	41	88	56	23	151	173	89	100	78	139	49	20	1,128	0.63%
Siritunga Jayasuriya	USP	113	18	68	42	19	146	122	68	47	68	110	1	18	840	0.47%
Sarath Manamendra	NSH	94	29	59	32	26	112	106	50	44	68	71	6	35	732	0.41%
Lal Perera	ONF	55	30	56	30	32	98	101	52	43	61	106	0	32	696	0.39%
Ukkubanda Wijekoon	Ind 3	82	31	70	38	10	93	105	52	34	71	85	1	11	683	0.38%
Wije Dias	SEP	92	20	32	94	19	68	62	25	43	58	127	1	16	657	0.37%
A. S. P. Liyanage	SLLP	80	31	59	43	23	100	85	54	24	50	75	0	21	645	0.36%
W. V. Mahiman Ranjith	Ind 1	59	27	51	60	27	83	66	31	39	47	63	2	16	571	0.32%
Sarath Kongahage	UNAF	67	23	35	33	12	64	63	37	41	57	71	3	12	518	0.29%
Aithurus M. Illias	Ind 2	85	19	43	36	8	72	48	31	27	41	62	1	12	485	0.27%
M. Mohamed Musthaffa	Ind 4	71	10	49	15	10	84	56	27	35	43	75	0	10	485	0.27%
Sanath Pinnaduwa	NA	47	8	35	18	13	67	45	36	24	38	63	0	18	412	0.23%
Senaratna de Silva	PNF	45	11	37	15	8	65	51	13	20	31	51	1	10	358	0.20%
Aruna de Soyza	RPP	41	12	19	12	8	64	35	16	30	38	70	2	4	351	0.20%
Battaramulla Seelarathana	JP	36	7	28	16	11	53	41	20	20	21	46	2	6	307	0.17%
M. B. Thaminimulla	ACAKO	31	11	23	9	9	34	38	20	22	20	35	1	7	260	0.15%
Valid Votes		18,590	11,960	14,440	9,983	6,280	20,508	21,594	16,391	12,388	13,355	18,684	4,410	9,786	178,369	100.00%
Rejected Votes		860	454	493	338	286	625	881	557	440	600	752	116	361	6,763	
Total Polled		19,450	12,414	14,933	10,321	6,566	21,133	22,475	16,948	12,828	13,955	19,436	4,526	10,147	185,132	
Registered Electors		65,141	64,714	69,082	53,111	90,811	65,798	71,114	72,558	48,613	56,426	63,991			721,359	
Turnout		29.86%	19.18%	21.62%	19.43%	7.23%	32.12%	31.60%	23.36%	26.39%	24.73%	30.37%			25.66%	

==== 2015 presidential election ====
Results of the 7th presidential election held on 8 January 2015:

Candidate	Party	Votes per Polling Division											Postal Votes	Total Votes	%
Candidate	Party	Chavaka -chcheri	Jaffna	Kankesan -thurai	Kayts	Kilino -chchi	Kopay	Manipay	Nallur	Point Pedro	Udu- piddy	Vaddu -koddai	Postal Votes	Total Votes	%
Maithripala Sirisena	NDF	23,520	17,994	18,729	8,144	38,856	27,161	26,958	24,929	17,388	18,137	20,873	10,885	253,574	74.42%
Mahinda Rajapaksa	UPFA	5,599	4,502	5,705	5,959	13,300	6,211	7,225	5,405	4,213	3,937	7,791	4,607	74,454	21.85%
Maulawi Ibrahim Mohanmed Mishlar	UPF	215	71	169	67	215	213	155	112	96	125	163	19	1,620	0.48%
A. S. P. Liyanage	SLLP	142	81	125	70	161	193	178	110	87	108	133	10	1,398	0.41%
Namal Ajith Rajapaksa	ONF	123	41	102	55	184	180	123	52	65	93	108	24	1,150	0.34%
Aithurus M. Illias	Ind	97	41	94	38	123	114	137	74	49	82	107	22	978	0.29%
Ratnayake Arachchige Sirisena	PNF	127	52	87	51	180	105	96	55	59	79	78	9	978	0.29%
Siritunga Jayasuriya	USP	96	66	105	34	115	118	128	79	47	50	122	15	975	0.29%
Ruwanthileke Peduru	ULPP	81	40	77	33	149	156	103	67	59	65	102	10	942	0.28%
Sarath Manamendra	NSH	76	33	61	30	106	88	71	34	44	59	67	8	677	0.20%
Sundaram Mahendran	NSSP	56	27	38	22	77	73	69	50	41	47	50	73	623	0.18%
Pani Wijesiriwardene	SEP	51	24	40	63	92	77	60	35	18	53	90	12	615	0.18%
Duminda Nagamuwa	FSP	69	31	51	26	66	89	69	40	38	43	78	10	610	0.18%
Muthu Bandara Theminimulla	AACAAK	62	33	58	11	56	93	69	44	28	45	66	3	568	0.17%
Anurudha Polgampola	Ind	51	14	59	18	63	56	63	44	36	44	55	5	508	0.15%
Prasanna Priyankara	DNM	29	15	40	16	39	51	44	34	22	30	30	10	360	0.11%
Battaramulle Seelarathana	JSP	29	11	42	19	41	41	43	22	11	24	39	7	329	0.10%
Jayantha Kulathunga	ULGC	19	12	19	14	37	22	20	15	12	17	23	4	214	0.06%
Wimal Geeganage	SLNF	14	8	15	8	26	33	16	11	7	14	22	4	178	0.05%
Valid Votes		30,456	23,096	25,616	14,678	53,886	35,074	35,627	31,212	22,320	23,052	29,997	15,737	340,751	100.00%
Rejected Votes		953	423	822	495	1,940	1,138	960	660	576	574	1,043	454	10,038	
Total Polled		31,409	23,519	26,438	15,173	55,826	36,212	36,587	31,872	22,896	23,626	31,040	16,191	350,789	
Registered Electors		51,702	33,050	63,217	22,057	79,093	55,891	54,567	46,699	36,138	39,204	47,621		529,239	
Turnout		60.75%	71.16%	41.82%	68.79%	70.58%	64.79%	67.05%	68.25%	63.36%	60.26%	65.18%		66.28%	

=== Parliamentary elections ===
==== 1989 parliamentary election ====
Results of the 9th parliamentary election held on 15 February 1989:

Party	Votes per Polling Division											Postal Votes	Total Votes	%	Seats
Party	Chavaka -chcheri	Jaffna	Kankesan -thurai	Kayts	Kilino -chchi	Kopay	Manipay	Nallur	Point Pedro	Udu- piddy	Vaddu -koddai	Postal Votes	Total Votes	%	Seats
Independent (EROS)	7,851	18,688	14,801	17,108	8,576	17,846	18,521	21,123	5,860	1,587	17,814	565	150,340	62.68%	8
Tamil United Liberation Front (ENDLF, EPRLF, TELO, TULF)	6,350	5,323	9,073	3,706	8,850	6,717	6,048	4,211	2,428	1,178	5,827	302	60,013	25.02%	3
Sri Lanka Muslim Congress	553	3,387	500	466	669	815	592	410	275	84	682	6	8,439	3.52%	0
Democratic People's Liberation Front (PLOTE)	581	409	1,199	572	740	1,073	1,252	531	384	171	1,050	31	7,993	3.33%	0
All Ceylon Tamil Congress	985	1,410	532	391	565	852	535	1,137	342	127	541	193	7,610	3.17%	0
United National Party (CWC, UNP)	339	470	388	354	1,522	421	496	320	569	46	470	65	5,460	2.28%	0
Valid Votes	16,659	29,687	26,493	22,597	20,922	27,724	27,444	27,732	9,858	3,193	26,384	1,162	239,855	100.00%	11
Rejected Votes	3,254	1,649	2,817	2,577	3,603	2,954	2,453	1,375	894	380	3,217	30	25,203		
Total Polled	19,913	31,336	29,310	25,174	24,525	30,678	29,897	29,107	10,752	3,573	29,601	1,192	265,058		
Registered Electors	51,374	49,068	60,282	49,401	53,421	56,413	58,166	61,624	40,060	51,943	58,770	1,688	592,210		
Turnout	38.76%	63.86%	48.62%	50.96%	45.91%	54.38%	51.40%	47.23%	26.84%	6.88%	50.37%	70.62%	44.76%		

The following candidates were elected: Eliyathamby Ratnasabapathy (EROS), 40,947 preference votes (pv); Eliyathamby Pararasasingam (EROS), 36,340 pv; S. Sivamaharajah (EROS), 22,622 pv; K. Navaratnam (EPRLF), 22,255 pv; Arunasalam Ponniah Selliah (EROS), 20,747 pv; Suresh Premachandran (EPRLF), 20,738 pv; G. Yogasangari (EPRLF), 20,223 pv; Thambu Loganathapillai (EROS), 17,616 pv; Sebastiyampillai Edward (EROS), 17,429 pv; Kanapathy Selvanayagam (EROS), 14,440 pv; and Joseph George Rajenthiram (EROS), 13,928 pv.

G. Yogasangari (EPRLF) was killed on 19 June 1990.

==== 1994 parliamentary election ====
Results of the 10th parliamentary election held on 16 August 1994:

Party	Votes per Polling Division											Postal Votes	Total Votes	%	Seats
Party	Chavaka -chcheri	Jaffna	Kankesan -thurai	Kayts	Kilino -chchi	Kopay	Manipay	Nallur	Point Pedro	Udu- piddy	Vaddu -koddai	Postal Votes	Total Votes	%	Seats
Independent 2 (EPDP)	13	76	93	9,944	2	40	4	8	3	5	556	0	10,744	79.71%	9
Sri Lanka Muslim Congress	62	1,914	4	56	56	0	0	0	0	1	5	0	2,098	15.56%	1
Independent 1 (EROS, PLOTE, TELO)	2	26	15	214	6	17	8	9	31	1	43	2	374	2.77%	0
Eelam People's Revolutionary Liberation Front	2	6	9	232	2	0	0	2	0	1	8	1	263	1.95%	0
Valid Votes	79	2,022	121	10,446	66	57	12	19	34	8	612	3	13,479	100.00%	10
Rejected Votes	3	8	6	302	0	3	1	1	1	0	27	0	352		
Total Polled	82	2,030	127	10,748	66	60	13	20	35	8	639	3	13,831		
Registered Electors	51,717	50,045	60,417	49,504	55,995	56,496	58,382	62,372	40,336	52,153	58,949		596,366		
Turnout	0.16%	4.06%	0.21%	21.71%	0.12%	0.11%	0.02%	0.03%	0.09%	0.02%	1.08%		2.32%		

The following candidates were elected: Douglas Devananda (EPDP), 2,091 preference votes (pv); Aithurus M. Illias (SLMC), 1,575 pv; Alagaiah Rasamanickam (EPDP), 1,110 pv; Umapathisivam Baskaran (EPDP), 1,056 pv; Rajendran Ramamoorthy (EPDP), 1,050 pv; Nadarajah "Ramesh" Atputharajah (EPDP), 968 pv; Murugesu Chandrakumar (EPDP), 798 pv; Sangarapillai Sivathasan (EPDP), 456 pv; Sinniah Thangavel (EPDP) 398 pv; and M.A. Ghafoor Zafarullah (EPDP), 351 pv.

Nadarajah "Ramesh" Atputharajah (EPDP) was killed on 2 November 1999.

==== 2000 parliamentary election ====
Results of the 11th parliamentary election held on 10 October 2000:

Party	Votes per Polling Division											Postal Votes	Displaced Votes	Total Votes	%	Seats
Party	Chavaka -chcheri	Jaffna	Kankesan -thurai	Kayts	Kilino -chchi	Kopay	Manipay	Nallur	Point Pedro	Udu- piddy	Vaddu -koddai	Postal Votes	Displaced Votes	Total Votes	%	Seats
Eelam People's Democratic Party	1,256	1,571	4,068	12,311	216	5,044	5,737	2,560	1,862	1,662	4,869	380	135	41,671	35.00%	4
Tamil United Liberation Front	1,284	1,277	4,943	1,327	119	4,248	5,703	3,587	1,540	4,180	4,035	518	91	32,852	27.59%	3
United National Party (DWC, NWC, UCPF, UNP)	913	581	524	820	278	1,051	955	1,523	978	1,046	2,153	74	535	11,431	9.60%	1
All Ceylon Tamil Congress	658	394	331	166	43	891	1,160	1,262	2,493	2,024	908	288	30	10,648	8.94%	1
Independent 2	1,043	406	304	223	138	829	872	342	180	328	208	32	2	4,907	4.12%	0
Democratic People's Liberation Front (EROS, PLOTE)	288	471	254	68	24	867	1,067	295	705	243	447	49	79	4,857	4.08%	0
Left & Democratic Alliance	46	15	152	6	0	825	124	83	28	73	1,079	17	4	2,452	2.06%	0
Independent 5	8	6	14	25	2	51	32	24	20	30	29	1	1,992	2,234	1.88%	0
Independent 6	56	120	43	275	18	110	164	98	123	782	241	28	132	2,190	1.84%	0
Independent 1	13	114	174	26	1	548	634	38	19	22	50	2	16	1,657	1.39%	0
Independent 3	66	226	77	28	1	241	256	406	59	110	143	20	16	1,649	1.38%	0
National Unity Alliance (SLMC et al.)	5	3	13	17	0	24	39	15	22	22	28	2	825	1,015	0.85%	0
Citizen's Front	6	13	27	22	1	44	42	23	29	24	45	0	51	327	0.27%	0
Sinhala Heritage	14	7	14	32	0	37	36	18	30	39	38	1	1	267	0.22%	0
Independent 4	0	2	6	7	2	17	6	8	4	5	14	0	116	187	0.16%	0
Janatha Vimukthi Peramuna	7	6	14	18	1	27	20	10	9	17	34	0	9	172	0.14%	0
Muslim United Liberation Front	4	3	3	3	1	12	7	4	3	5	9	0	107	161	0.14%	0
Ruhuna People's Party	2	3	18	8	1	24	24	8	10	16	27	1	0	142	0.12%	0
Sinhalaye Mahasammatha Bhoomiputra Pakshaya	9	7	13	10	2	21	16	6	12	24	14	0	1	135	0.11%	0
Liberal Party	3	2	12	5	3	24	18	8	12	13	13	0	2	115	0.10%	0
Valid Votes	5,681	5,227	11,004	15,397	851	14,935	16,912	10,318	8,138	10,665	14,384	1,413	4,144	119,069	100.00%	9
Rejected Votes	1,003	485	1,291	935	163	1,787	2,115	920	1,055	1,600	2,017			13,664		
Total Polled	6,684	5,712	12,295	16,332	1,014	16,722	19,027	11,238	9,193	12,265	16,401			132,733		
Registered Electors	53,933	53,666	63,000	51,007	57,543	59,419	62,692	65,203	42,781	53,668	59,419			622,331		
Turnout (%)	12.39%	10.64%	19.52%	32.02%	1.76%	28.14%	30.35%	17.24%	21.49%	22.85%	27.60%			21.33%		

The following candidates were elected: V. Anandasangaree (TULF), 12,888 pv; Mavai Senathirajah (TULF), 10,965 pv; Douglas Devananda (EPDP), 7,658 pv; S. Sivamaharajah (TULF), 7,187 pv; T. Maheswaran (UNP), 4,807 pv; Nadarasah Mathanarajah (EPDP), 4,673 pv; Karthigesu Velummylum Kugendran (EPDP), 4,244 pv; A. Vinayagamoorthy (ACTC), 3,825 pv; and Kandiah Sangaran (EPDP), 2,902 pv.

==== 2001 parliamentary election ====
Results of the 12th parliamentary election held on 5 December 2001:

Party	Votes per Polling Division											Postal Votes	Displaced Votes	Total Votes	%	Seats
Party	Chavaka -chcheri	Jaffna	Kankesan -thurai	Kayts	Kilino -chchi	Kopay	Manipay	Nallur	Point Pedro	Udu- piddy	Vaddu -koddai	Postal Votes	Displaced Votes	Total Votes	%	Seats
Tamil National Alliance (ACTC, EPRLF(S), TELO, TULF)	9,865	7,368	8,898	4,304	1,100	12,539	13,539	11,787	8,525	12,493	9,800	1,496	610	102,324	54.84%	6
Eelam People's Democratic Party	2,221	3,647	5,580	15,378	431	6,300	7,450	4,565	2,736	3,385	4,609	576	330	57,208	30.66%	2
United National Front (CWC, UNP, WPF)	1,218	974	1,231	764	191	1,753	1,999	1,970	1,273	1,022	3,445	172	233	16,245	8.71%	1
Sri Lanka Muslim Congress	27	299	51	23	3	85	95	334	12	36	35	2	2,362	3,364	1.80%	0
Independent	1,045	311	234	24	68	181	349	217	34	126	60	20	8	2,677	1.43%	0
Democratic Left Front	28	20	75	4	0	689	127	82	429	121	461	16	2	2,054	1.10%	0
Democratic People's Liberation Front (PLOTE)	79	274	77	19	2	326	215	159	121	55	44	24	59	1,454	0.78%	0
United Socialist Party	27	15	29	23	9	46	68	44	30	39	73	0	7	410	0.22%	0
New Left Front (NSSP et al.)	31	21	34	9	4	70	72	29	26	47	55	0	9	407	0.22%	0
Janatha Vimukthi Peramuna	15	12	30	14	1	40	27	21	14	17	48	2	1	242	0.13%	0
Sinhala Heritage	20	13	21	22	2	32	28	21	8	23	20	0	3	213	0.11%	0
Valid Votes	14,576	12,954	16,260	20,584	1,811	22,061	23,969	19,229	13,208	17,364	18,650	2,308	3,624	186,598	100.00%	9
Rejected Votes	1,264	624	899	777	133	1,354	1,370	547	823	1,084	1,478	46	282	10,681		
Total Polled	15,840	13,578	17,159	21,361	1,944	23,415	25,339	19,776	14,031	18,448	20,128	2,354	3,906	197,279		
Registered Electors	54,779	55,244	64,119	51,072	57,595	61,334	64,262	67,057	43,087	53,941	60,967			633,457		
Turnout (%)	28.92%	24.58%	26.76%	41.83%	3.38%	38.18%	39.43%	29.49%	32.56%	34.20%	33.01%			31.14%		

The following candidates were elected: V. Anandasangaree (TNA-TULF), 36,217 preference votes (pv); Mavai Senathirajah (TNA-TULF), 33,831 pv; Gajendrakumar Ponnambalam (TNA-ACTC), 29,641 pv; A. Vinayagamoorthy (TNA-ACTC), 19,472 pv; Nadarajah Raviraj (TNA-TULF), 19,263 pv; M. K. Shivajilingam (TNA-TELO), 17,859 pv; T. Maheswaran (UNF), 11,598 pv; Douglas Devananda (EPDP), 9,744 pv; and Nadarasah Mathanarajah (EPDP), 7,350 pv.

==== 2004 parliamentary election ====
Results of the 13th parliamentary election held on 2 April 2004:

Party	Votes per Polling Division											Postal Votes	Displaced Votes	Total Votes	%	Seats
Party	Chavaka -chcheri	Jaffna	Kankesan -thurai	Kayts	Kilino -chchi	Kopay	Manipay	Nallur	Point Pedro	Udu- piddy	Vaddu -koddai	Postal Votes	Displaced Votes	Total Votes	%	Seats
Tamil National Alliance (ACTC, EPRLF(S), ITAK, TELO)	30,882	16,353	18,499	13,911	29,574	26,805	23,779	22,321	22,400	24,172	24,240	3,175	1,209	257,320	90.60%	8
Eelam People's Democratic Party	1,252	1,710	2,395	1,406	145	2,108	3,239	2,431	676	874	1,513	420	443	18,612	6.55%	1
Independent 1 (TULF)	492	360	405	51	171	453	980	800	248	362	485	340	9	5,156	1.82%	0
Sri Lanka Muslim Congress	8	151	7	41	5	16	11	14	2	13	9	1	1,717	1,995	0.70%	0
United Socialist Party	24	6	27	14	18	32	36	32	22	25	42	1	12	291	0.10%	0
New Left Front (NSSP et al.)	19	13	25	11	6	36	54	30	9	23	32	7	1	266	0.09%	0
Independent 2	24	17	8	8	6	15	22	14	6	15	15	0	1	151	0.05%	0
Jathika Hela Urumaya	9	4	5	4	8	12	20	5	5	12	9	1	1	95	0.03%	0
Swarajya	6	11	8	3	2	9	11	5	1	6	7	1	3	73	0.03%	0
Ruhuna People's Party	8	5	7	5	4	9	6	7	3	5	6	0	2	67	0.02%	0
Valid Votes	32,724	18,630	21,386	15,454	29,939	29,495	28,158	25,659	23,372	25,507	26,358	3,946	3,398	284,026	100.00%	9
Rejected Votes	2,966	1,120	1,631	1,282	2,213	2,445	2,268	1,465	1,028	1,956	2,543	39	277	21,233		
Total Polled	35,690	19,750	23,017	16,736	32,152	31,940	30,426	27,124	24,400	27,463	28,901	3,985	3,675	305,259		
Registered Electors	57,379	57,460	64,434	51,911	57,975	61,403	65,218	67,672	45,457	54,087	61,283			644,279		
Turnout (%)	62.20%	34.37%	35.72%	32.24%	55.46%	52.02%	46.65%	40.08%	53.68%	50.78%	47.16%			47.38%		

The following candidates were elected: Selvarajah Kajendren (TNA), 112,077 preference votes (pv); Pathmini Sithamparanathan (TNA), 68,240 pv; Gajendrakumar Ponnambalam (TNA-ACTC), 60,770 pv; Suresh Premachandran (TNA-EPRLF), 45,786 pv; K. Sivanesan (TNA), 43,730 pv; Nadarajah Raviraj (TNA-ITAK), 42,965 pv; M. K. Shivajilingam (TNA-TELO), 42,193 pv; Mavai Senathirajah (TNA-ITAK), 38,783 pv; and Douglas Devananda (EPDP), 9,405 pv.

Nadarajah Raviraj (TNA-ITAK) was killed on 10 November 2006. His replacement Nallathamby Srikantha (TNA-TELO) was sworn in on 30 November 2006.

K. Sivanesan (TNA) was killed on 6 March 2008. His replacement Solomon Cyril (TNA) was sworn in on 9 April 2008.

==== 2010 parliamentary election ====
Results of the 14th parliamentary election held on 8 April 2010:

Party	Votes per Polling Division											Postal Votes	Displaced Votes	Total Votes	%	Seats
Party	Chavaka -chcheri	Jaffna	Kankesan -thurai	Kayts	Kilino -chchi	Kopay	Manipay	Nallur	Point Pedro	Udu- piddy	Vaddu -koddai	Postal Votes	Displaced Votes	Total Votes	%	Seats
Tamil National Alliance (EPRLF(S), ITAK, TELO)	7,664	4,713	5,018	1,671	4,192	7,467	7,194	7,490	3,783	4,630	5,341	3,813	2,143	65,119	43.85%	5
United People's Freedom Alliance (ACMC, EPDP, SLFP et al.)	2,777	3,479	4,518	6,441	3,367	4,377	5,643	3,467	3,402	2,533	3,286	1,529	2,803	47,622	32.07%	3
United National Front (DPF, SLFP(P), SLMC, UNP)	1,248	616	584	392	386	1,122	1,424	896	697	717	3,438	461	643	12,624	8.50%	1
Tamil National People's Front (ACTC et al.)	445	688	337	104	85	370	397	730	1,123	760	831	474	18	6,362	4.28%	0
Tamil United Liberation Front	298	130	169	33	497	165	473	188	98	228	388	176	49	2,892	1.95%	0
Independent 11	315	41	206	72	25	410	296	141	264	261	505	26	0	2,562	1.73%	0
Independent 4	574	39	144	9	11	215	332	194	79	257	252	41	4	2,151	1.45%	0
Eelam People's Revolutionary Liberation Front (Padmanaba)	563	92	112	25	201	311	268	62	9	34	115	27	2	1,821	1.23%	0
Independent 3	112	22	57	12	9	223	115	98	214	171	57	69	2	1,161	0.78%	0
Independent 6	15	4	168	2	7	451	59	46	19	75	171	21	0	1,038	0.70%	0
Left Liberation Front (LLF, TNLA)	30	56	42	45	3	37	79	47	49	314	125	39	2	868	0.58%	0
Eelavar Democratic Front (EROS)	79	92	54	27	57	104	96	67	37	43	161	7	34	858	0.58%	0
Democratic Unity Alliance	19	28	20	22	255	81	50	70	21	29	91	9	69	764	0.51%	0
Independent 5	17	36	30	18	6	64	66	73	16	53	46	11	1	437	0.29%	0
Independent 10	20	19	14	11	60	33	37	52	6	9	82	36	20	399	0.27%	0
United Socialist Party	100	15	9	7	8	28	21	23	9	10	40	7	3	280	0.19%	0
Independent 7	6	1	11	0	7	75	15	6	15	109	6	10	0	261	0.18%	0
Democratic National Alliance (JVP et al.)	10	12	13	1	9	28	17	17	3	22	19	4	46	201	0.14%	0
Independent 1	17	29	4	2	4	18	9	30	18	34	11	4	3	183	0.12%	0
Independent 2	72	8	4	2	2	13	11	8	12	19	20	4	4	179	0.12%	0
Independent 9	37	5	10	1	10	31	17	11	2	5	29	3	10	171	0.12%	0
Janasetha Peramuna	11	16	8	5	0	12	12	16	21	7	24	2	0	134	0.09%	0
Independent 12	12	7	3	5	2	16	9	7	3	9	12	2	22	109	0.07%	0
Socialist Equality Party	5	8	5	27	3	8	11	2	0	6	22	4	0	101	0.07%	0
Independent 8	11	2	2	8	1	15	12	7	9	5	19	2	0	93	0.06%	0
Tamil Makkal Viduthalai Pulikal	9	5	6	5	4	6	6	4	7	3	10	0	4	69	0.05%	0
All Are Citizens, All Are Kings Organisation	10	0	1	0	1	4	10	5	2	4	7	0	0	44	0.03%	0
Valid Votes	14,476	10,163	11,549	8,947	9,212	15,684	16,679	13,757	9,918	10,347	15,108	6,781	5,882	148,503	100.00%	9
Rejected Votes	2,180	1,037	1,621	1,326	1,807	2,021	2,239	1,334	1,194	1,485	2,128	314	1,088	19,774		
Total Polled	16,656	11,200	13,170	10,273	11,019	17,705	18,918	15,091	11,112	11,832	17,236	7,095	6,970	168,277		
Registered Electors	65,141	64,714	69,082	53,111	90,811	65,798	71,114	72,558	48,613	56,426	63,991			721,359		
Turnout	25.57%	17.31%	19.06%	19.34%	12.13%	26.91%	26.60%	20.80%	22.86%	20.97%	26.94%			23.33%		

The following candidates were elected: Douglas Devananda (UPFA-EPDP), 28,585 preference votes (pv); Mavai Senathirajah (TNA-ITAK), 20,501 pv; Suresh Premachandran (TNA-EPRLF), 16,425 pv; A. Vinayagamoorthy (TNA), 15,311 pv; E. Saravanapavan (TNA), 14,961 pv; Silvestri Alantine (UPFA-EPDP), 13,128 pv; S. Sritharan (TNA), 10,057; Murugesu Chandrakumar (UPFA-EPDP), 8,105 pv; and Vijayakala Maheswaran (UNF-UNP), 7,160 pv.

=== Provincial council elections ===
==== 1988 provincial council election ====
Results of the 1st North Eastern provincial council election held on 19 November 1988:

Jaffna District - The Eelam People's Revolutionary Liberation Front won all 19 seats uncontested.

Kilinochchi District - The Eelam National Democratic Liberation Front won all 3 seats uncontested.

==== 2013 provincial council election ====
Results of the 1st Northern provincial council election held on 21 September 2013:

Jaffna District

Party	Votes per Polling Division										Postal Votes	Total Votes	%	Seats
Party	Chavaka -chcheri	Jaffna	Kankesan -thurai	Kayts	Kopay	Manipay	Nallur	Point Pedro	Udu- piddy	Vaddu -koddai	Postal Votes	Total Votes	%	Seats
Tamil National Alliance (EPRLF (S), ITAK, PLOTE, TELO, TULF)	22,922	16,421	19,596	8,917	26,467	28,210	23,733	17,719	18,855	23,442	7,625	213,907	84.37%	14
United People's Freedom Alliance (ACMC, EPDP, SLFP et al.)	4,193	2,416	4,048	4,164	4,386	3,898	2,651	2,953	2,424	3,763	1,099	35,995	14.20%	2
United National Party	89	60	35	17	127	88	148	26	57	173	35	855	0.34%	0
Democratic Unity Alliance	31	21	41	21	53	54	62	162	27	43	10	525	0.21%	0
Independent 1	25	40	24	3	80	33	38	80	54	19	10	406	0.16%	0
Independent 6	7	7	42	1	88	109	22	2	35	27	16	356	0.14%	0
Sri Lanka People's Party	61	18	19	16	71	17	22	20	6	38	4	292	0.12%	0
Independent 7	10	34	62	8	18	19	18	3	1	86	12	271	0.11%	0
Independent 3	6	10	17	15	20	62	10	11	9	50	5	215	0.08%	0
United Socialist Party	27	6	20	11	34	14	14	10	11	18	0	165	0.07%	0
Democratic Party	10	4	5	1	10	35	19	7	3	14	3	111	0.04%	0
Socialist Equality Party	4	5	7	29	7	8	7	0	3	26	5	101	0.04%	0
Janasetha Peramuna	11	2	2	2	3	3	3	23	13	6	6	74	0.03%	0
Independent 9	3	8	10	6	10	2	3	6	6	8	1	63	0.02%	0
Independent 8	7	4	11	8	7	7	3	3	1	7	1	59	0.02%	0
Janatha Vimukthi Peramuna	2	3	4	5	9	9	10	3	1	7	3	56	0.02%	0
Independent 4	3	3	1	0	4	6	2	5	2	2	0	28	0.01%	0
Independent 2	0	0	2	0	5	6	3	0	3	5	0	24	0.01%	0
Independent 5	1	1	1	2	9	4	1	2	0	2	0	23	0.01%	0
Sri Lanka Labour Party	3	0	0	1	3	1	5	3	0	0	0	16	0.01%	0
Valid Votes	27,415	19,063	23,947	13,227	31,411	32,585	26,774	21,038	21,511	27,736	8,835	253,542	100.00%	16
Rejected Votes	2,378	1,240	2,074	1,377	3,195	2,531	1,650	1,444	1,755	2,521	114	20,279		
Total Polled	29,793	20,303	26,021	14,604	34,606	35,116	28,424	22,482	23,266	30,257	8,949	273,821		
Registered Electors	49,479	28,610	61,196	21,548	53,617	51,722	42,466	35,054	37,926	45,195		426,813		
Turnout	60.21%	70.96%	42.52%	67.77%	64.54%	67.89%	66.93%	64.14%	61.35%	66.95%		64.15%		

Kilinochchi District

Party	Kilino -chchi	Postal Votes	Total Votes	%	Seats
Tamil National Alliance (EPRLF (S), ITAK, PLOTE, TELO, TULF)	36,323	756	37,079	81.57%	3
United People's Freedom Alliance (ACMC, EPDP, SLFP et al.)	7,737	160	7,897	17.37%	1
Eelavar Democratic Front (EROS)	300	0	300	0.66%	0
Democratic Unity Alliance	60	1	61	0.13%	0
United National Party	53	1	54	0.12%	0
Independent 2	22	0	22	0.05%	0
Janatha Vimukthi Peramuna	18	0	18	0.04%	0
Independent 1	7	0	7	0.02%	0
United Lanka Great Council	6	0	6	0.01%	0
Democratic Party	5	0	5	0.01%	0
Nationalities Unity Organisation	4	0	4	0.01%	0
Sri Lanka Labour Party	3	1	4	0.01%	0
Janasetha Peramuna	2	0	2	0.00%	0
Valid Votes	44,540	919	45,459	17.93%	4
Rejected Votes	4,725	10	4,735		
Total Polled	49,265	929	50,194		
Registered Electors	68,600		68,600		
Turnout	71.81%		73.17%		
