= Chavakachcheri Polling Division =

Chavakachcheri
- Polling Division
- Coordinates: 9.656097°N 80.166465°E
- Country: Sri Lanka
- Province: Northern Province, Sri Lanka
- Electoral District: Jaffna Electoral District

Area
  - Total: 233.72 km^{2} (90.24 sq mi)

Population (2012)
  - Total: 64,704
  - Density: 277/km^{2} (720/sq mi)
- ISO 3166 code: EC-10H

The Chavakachcheri Polling Division is a Polling Division in the Jaffna Electoral District, in the Northern Province, Sri Lanka.

== Presidential Election Results ==
=== Summary ===
The winner of Chavakachcheri has matched the final country result 2 out of 8 times.

Year	Chavakachcheri	Jaffna Electoral District	MAE %	Sri Lanka	MAE %
2019	NDF	NDF	0.82%	SLPP	42.55%
2015	NDF	NDF	2.85%	NDF	27.20%
2010	NDF	NDF	0.99%	UPFA	28.23%
2005	UNP	UNP	4.28%	UPFA	23.77%
1999	UNP	PA	16.70%	PA	20.01%
1994	PA	PA	6.22%	PA	27.09%
1988	SLMP	SLFP	3.22%	UNP	19.10%
1982	ACTC	ACTC	5.62%	UNP	23.31%
Matches/Mean MAE	2/8	3/8	5.09%	8/8	26.41%

=== 2019 Sri Lankan Presidential Election ===
Party	Chavakachcheri		Jaffna Electoral District		Sri Lanka	
Party	Votes	%	Votes	%	Votes	%
NDF	28,007	84.75%	312,722	83.86%	5,564,239	41.99%
Other Parties (with < 1%)	2,231	6.75%	23,295	6.25%	717,212	5.41%
SLPP	1,775	5.37%	23,261	6.24%	6,924,255	52.25%
DUNF	656	1.99%	6,790	1.82%	34,537	0.26%
IND10	377	1.14%	6,845	1.84%	12,256	0.09%
Valid Votes	33,046	97.43%	372,913	97.07%	13,252,499	98.99%
Rejected Votes	871	2.57%	11,251	2.93%	135,452	1.01%
Total Polled	33,917	63.70%	384,164	68.00%	13,387,951	83.71%
Registered Electors	53,247		564,984		15,992,568	

=== 2015 Sri Lankan Presidential Election ===
Party	Chavakachcheri		Jaffna Electoral District		Sri Lanka	
Party	Votes	%	Votes	%	Votes	%
NDF	23,520	77.23%	253,574	74.42%	6,217,162	51.28%
UPFA	5,599	18.38%	74,454	21.85%	5,768,090	47.58%
Other Parties (with < 1%)	1,337	4.39%	12,723	3.73%	138,200	1.14%
Valid Votes	30,456	96.97%	340,751	97.14%	12,123,452	98.85%
Rejected Votes	953	3.03%	10,038	2.86%	140,925	1.15%
Total Polled	31,409	60.75%	350,789	64.22%	12,264,377	78.69%
Registered Electors	51,702		546,265		15,585,942	

=== 2010 Sri Lankan Presidential Election ===
Party	Chavakachcheri		Jaffna Electoral District		Sri Lanka	
Party	Votes	%	Votes	%	Votes	%
NDF	11,599	62.39%	113,877	63.84%	4,173,185	40.15%
UPFA	4,567	24.57%	44,154	24.75%	6,015,934	57.88%
Other Parties (with < 1%)	1,260	6.78%	10,438	5.85%	132,316	1.27%
UDF	493	2.65%	3,325	1.86%	23,290	0.22%
Ind 5	348	1.87%	3,205	1.80%	9,662	0.09%
DUNF	323	1.74%	3,370	1.89%	39,226	0.38%
Valid Votes	18,590	95.58%	178,369	96.35%	10,393,613	99.03%
Rejected Votes	860	4.42%	6,763	3.65%	101,838	0.97%
Total Polled	19,450	29.86%	185,132	25.15%	10,495,451	66.70%
Registered Electors	65,141		736,032		15,734,587	

=== 2005 Sri Lankan Presidential Election ===
Party	Chavakachcheri		Jaffna Electoral District		Sri Lanka	
Party	Votes	%	Votes	%	Votes	%
UNP	33	66.00%	5,523	70.20%	4,706,366	48.43%
UPFA	10	20.00%	1,967	25.00%	4,887,152	50.29%
USP	2	4.00%	72	0.92%	35,425	0.36%
NLF	2	4.00%	24	0.31%	9,296	0.10%
DUA	1	2.00%	31	0.39%	5,082	0.05%
SEP	1	2.00%	29	0.37%	3,500	0.04%
SLNF	1	2.00%	15	0.19%	6,639	0.07%
Valid Votes	50	94.34%	7,868	92.30%	9,717,039	98.88%
Rejected Votes	3	5.66%	656	7.70%	109,869	1.12%
Total Polled	53	0.09%	8,524	1.20%	9,826,908	69.51%
Registered Electors	62,022		707,970		14,136,979	

=== 1999 Sri Lankan Presidential Election ===
Party	Chavakachcheri		Jaffna Electoral District		Sri Lanka	
Party	Votes	%	Votes	%	Votes	%
UNP	7,494	61.94%	48,005	43.03%	3,602,748	42.71%
PA	3,430	28.35%	52,043	46.65%	4,312,157	51.12%
Other Parties (with < 1%)	533	4.41%	5,215	4.67%	452,527	5.36%
LDA	356	2.94%	3,394	3.04%	23,668	0.28%
SLMP	158	1.31%	1,041	0.93%	17,359	0.21%
Ind 2	127	1.05%	1,873	1.68%	27,052	0.32%
Valid Votes	12,098	91.95%	111,568	94.91%	8,435,754	97.69%
Rejected Votes	1,059	8.05%	5,981	5.09%	199,536	2.31%
Total Polled	13,157	24.71%	117,549	19.15%	8,635,290	72.17%
Registered Electors	53,247		613,718		11,965,536	

=== 1994 Sri Lankan Presidential Election ===
Party	Chavakachcheri		Jaffna Electoral District		Sri Lanka	
Party	Votes	%	Votes	%	Votes	%
PA	63	90.00%	16,934	96.35%	4,709,205	62.28%
UNP	6	8.57%	223	1.27%	2,715,283	35.91%
Ind 2	1	1.43%	341	1.94%	58,888	0.78%
Valid Votes	70	95.89%	17,575	99.20%	7,561,526	98.03%
Rejected Votes	3	4.11%	141	0.80%	151,706	1.97%
Total Polled	73	0.14%	17,716	2.97%	7,713,232	69.12%
Registered Electors	51,717		596,422		11,158,880	

=== 1988 Sri Lankan Presidential Election ===
Party	Chavakachcheri		Jaffna Electoral District		Sri Lanka	
Party	Votes	%	Votes	%	Votes	%
SLMP	4,023	40.12%	42,198	35.15%	235,701	4.63%
SLFP	3,704	36.94%	44,197	36.82%	2,289,857	44.95%
UNP	2,300	22.94%	33,650	28.03%	2,569,199	50.43%
Valid Votes	10,027	90.64%	120,045	93.38%	5,094,754	98.24%
Rejected Votes	1,035	9.36%	8,517	6.62%	91,499	1.76%
Total Polled	11,062	21.44%	128,562	23.30%	5,186,256	55.87%
Registered Electors	51,595		551,713		9,283,143	

=== 1982 Sri Lankan Presidential Election ===
Party	Chavakachcheri		Jaffna Electoral District		Sri Lanka	
Party	Votes	%	Votes	%	Votes	%
ACTC	9,742	48.12%	87,263	40.03%	173,934	2.67%
SLFP	6,128	30.27%	77,210	35.42%	2,546,348	39.05%
UNP	3,629	17.92%	44,775	20.54%	3,450,815	52.93%
LSSP	419	2.07%	3,376	1.55%	58,531	0.90%
JVP	204	1.01%	3,098	1.42%	273,428	4.19%
Other Parties (with < 1%)	125	0.62%	2,176	1.00%	16,995	0.26%
Valid Votes	20,247	94.38%	218,003	95.36%	6,520,156	98.78%
Rejected Votes	1,205	5.62%	10,610	4.64%	80,470	1.22%
Total Polled	21,452	48.10%	228,613	45.86%	6,600,626	80.15%
Registered Electors	44,597		498,545		8,235,358	

== Parliamentary Election Results ==
=== Summary ===
The winner of Chavakachcheri has matched the final country result 0 out of 7 times.

Year	Chavakachcheri	Jaffna Electoral District	MAE %	Sri Lanka	MAE %
2015	ITAK	ITAK	5.67%	UNP	37.08%
2010	ITAK	ITAK	8.31%	UPFA	32.70%
2004	ITAK	ITAK	3.61%	UPFA	6.40%
2001	TULF	TULF	11.92%	UNP	20.44%
2000	TULF	EPDP	8.29%	PA	10.58%
1994	SLMC	IND2	60.23%	PA	1.43%
1989	INDI	INDI	13.13%	UNP	27.26%
Matches/Mean MAE	0/7	0/7	15.88%	7/7	19.41%

=== 2015 Sri Lankan Parliamentary Election ===
Party	Chavakachcheri		Jaffna Electoral District		Sri Lanka	
Party	Votes	%	Votes	%	Votes	%
ITAK	20,188	77.29%	207,577	70.08%	515,963	4.63%
UNP	1,682	6.44%	20,025	6.76%	5,098,916	45.77%
UPFA	1,591	6.09%	17,309	5.84%	4,732,664	42.48%
EPDP	1,469	5.62%	30,232	10.21%	33,481	0.30%
AITC	766	2.93%	15,022	5.07%	18,644	0.17%
Other Parties (with < 1%)	424	1.62%	6,034	2.04%	580,476	5.21%
Valid Votes	26,120	90.44%	296,199	90.91%	11,140,333	95.35%
Rejected Votes	2,486	8.61%	25,496	7.83%	516,926	4.42%
Total Polled	28,881	55.86%	325,805	61.56%	11,684,111	77.66%
Registered Electors	51,702		529,239		15,044,490	

=== 2010 Sri Lankan Parliamentary Election ===
Party	Chavakachcheri		Jaffna Electoral District		Sri Lanka	
Party	Votes	%	Votes	%	Votes	%
ITAK	7,664	53.08%	65,119	44.03%	233,190	2.91%
UPFA	2,777	19.23%	47,622	32.20%	4,846,388	60.38%
UNP	1,248	8.64%	12,624	8.54%	2,357,057	29.37%
IG4J	574	3.98%	2,151	1.45%	2,151	0.03%
PERLF	563	3.90%	1,821	1.23%	2,100	0.03%
Other Parties (with < 1%)	543	3.76%	6,659	4.50%	479,888	5.98%
AITC	445	3.08%	6,362	4.30%	7,544	0.09%
IG1J	327	2.26%	2,648	1.79%	2,648	0.03%
TULF	298	2.06%	2,892	1.96%	9,223	0.11%
Valid Votes	14,439	86.69%	147,898	87.89%	8,026,322	96.03%
Rejected Votes	2,180	13.09%	19,774	11.75%	581,465	6.96%
Total Polled	16,656	25.57%	168,277	22.68%	8,358,246	59.29%
Registered Electors	65,141		742,005		14,097,690	

=== 2004 Sri Lankan Parliamentary Election ===
Party	Chavakachcheri		Jaffna Electoral District		Sri Lanka	
Party	Votes	%	Votes	%	Votes	%
ITAK	30,882	94.37%	257,320	90.60%	633,203	6.85%
EPDP	1,252	3.83%	18,612	6.55%	24,942	0.27%
IP1D	492	1.50%	5,156	1.82%	6,121	0.07%
Other Parties (with < 1%)	98	0.30%	2,938	1.03%	764,786	8.28%
Valid Votes	32,724	91.69%	284,026	93.04%	9,241,931	94.52%
Rejected Votes	2,966	8.31%	21,233	6.96%	534,452	5.47%
Total Polled	35,690	62.20%	305,259	46.65%	9,777,821	75.74%
Registered Electors	57,379		654,415		12,909,631	

=== 2001 Sri Lankan Parliamentary Election ===
Party	Chavakachcheri		Jaffna Electoral District		Sri Lanka	
Party	Votes	%	Votes	%	Votes	%
TULF	9,865	67.68%	102,324	54.84%	348,164	3.89%
EPDP	2,221	15.24%	57,208	30.66%	72,783	0.81%
UNP	1,218	8.36%	16,245	8.71%	4,086,026	45.62%
INDP	1,045	7.17%	2,677	1.43%	2,900	0.03%
Other Parties (with < 1%)	227	1.56%	8,144	4.36%	1,049,603	11.72%
Valid Votes	14,576	92.02%	186,598	94.59%	8,955,844	94.77%
Rejected Votes	1,264	7.98%	10,681	5.41%	494,009	5.23%
Total Polled	15,840	28.92%	197,279	31.14%	9,449,878	76.03%
Registered Electors	54,779		633,457		12,428,762	

=== 2000 Sri Lankan Parliamentary Election ===
Party	Chavakachcheri		Jaffna Electoral District		Sri Lanka	
Party	Votes	%	Votes	%	Votes	%
TULF	1,284	22.60%	32,761	28.50%	105,907	1.23%
EPDP	1,256	22.11%	41,536	36.13%	50,702	0.59%
IG2	1,043	18.36%	4,905	4.27%	31,443	0.37%
UNP	913	16.07%	10,896	9.48%	3,451,765	40.12%
ACTC	658	11.58%	10,618	9.24%	27,289	0.32%
DPLF	288	5.07%	4,778	4.16%	20,655	0.24%
Other Parties (with < 1%)	173	3.05%	7,844	6.82%	900,462	10.47%
IG3	66	1.16%	1,633	1.42%	6,109	0.07%
Valid Votes	5,681	N/A	114,971	N/A	8,602,617	N/A

=== 1994 Sri Lankan Parliamentary Election ===
Party	Chavakachcheri		Jaffna Electoral District		Sri Lanka	
Party	Votes	%	Votes	%	Votes	%
SLMC	62	78.48%	2,098	15.56%	143,307	1.80%
IND2	13	16.46%	10,744	79.71%	16,690	0.21%
EPRLF	2	2.53%	263	1.95%	9,411	0.12%
IND1	2	2.53%	374	2.77%	48,199	0.61%
Valid Votes	79	96.34%	13,479	97.41%	7,943,688	95.20%
Rejected Votes	3	3.66%	358	2.59%	400,395	4.80%
Total Polled	82	0.16%	13,837	2.32%	8,344,095	74.75%
Registered Electors	51,717		596,375		11,163,064	

=== 1989 Sri Lankan Parliamentary Election ===
Party	Chavakachcheri		Jaffna Electoral District		Sri Lanka	
Party	Votes	%	Votes	%	Votes	%
INDI	7,851	47.13%	150,340	62.68%	175,579	3.14%
TULF	6,350	38.12%	60,013	25.02%	188,594	3.37%
ACTC	985	5.91%	7,610	3.17%	7,610	0.14%
DPLF	581	3.49%	7,993	3.33%	19,150	0.34%
SLMC	553	3.32%	8,439	3.52%	202,016	3.61%
UNP	339	2.03%	5,460	2.28%	2,838,005	50.71%
Valid Votes	16,659	83.66%	239,855	90.49%	5,596,468	93.87%
Rejected Votes	3,254	16.34%	25,203	9.51%	365,563	6.13%
Total Polled	19,913	38.76%	265,058	44.76%	5,962,031	63.60%
Registered Electors	51,374		592,210		9,374,164	

== Demographics ==
=== Ethnicity ===
The Chavakachcheri Polling Division has a Sri Lankan Tamil majority (99.3%) . In comparison, the Jaffna Electoral District (which contains the Chavakachcheri Polling Division) has a Sri Lankan Tamil majority (98.6%)

Ethnicity in Chavakachcheri
1. Sri Lankan Tamil (99.3%)
2. Other (0.70%)

=== Religion ===
The Chavakachcheri Polling Division has a Hindu majority (92.7%) . In comparison, the Jaffna Electoral District (which contains the Chavakachcheri Polling Division) has a Hindu majority (82.6%) and a significant Roman Catholic population (12.6%)

Religion in Chavakachcheri
1. Hindu (92.7%)
2. Roman Catholic (3.80%)
3. Other Christian (3.30%)
4. Other (0.30%)
