= Rajendran Ramamoorthy =

Sri Lankan Politician

Hon. Rajendran Ramamoorthy MP

Member of Parliament for Jaffna District
- In office 1994–2000

Personal details
- Born: 3 August 1967 (age 58)
- Party: Independent
- Other political affiliations: Eelam People's Democratic Party
- Ethnicity: Sri Lankan Tamil

Rajendran Ramamoorthy is a Sri Lankan Politician. He was a member of the Parliament of Sri Lanka . He belonged to the Eelam People's Democratic Party. He however quit the EPDP after a dispute with party leader Douglas Devananda and later EPDP expelled them.
