= Kopay Polling Division =

Kopay
- Polling Division
- Coordinates: 9.743185°N 80.100060°E
- Country: Sri Lanka
- Province: Northern Province, Sri Lanka
- Electoral District: Jaffna Electoral District

Area
  - Total: 96.03 km^{2} (37.08 sq mi)

Population (2012)
  - Total: 73,225
  - Density: 763/km^{2} (1,980/sq mi)
- ISO 3166 code: EC-10E

The Kopay Polling Division is a Polling Division in the Jaffna Electoral District, in the Northern Province, Sri Lanka.

== Presidential Election Results ==
=== Summary ===
The winner of Kopay has matched the final country result 3 out of 8 times.

| Year | Kopay | Jaffna Electoral District | MAE % | Sri Lanka | MAE % |
|---|---|---|---|---|---|
| 2019 | NDF | NDF | 0.45% | SLPP | 42.18% |
| 2015 | NDF | NDF | 3.16% | NDF | 27.63% |
| 2010 | NDF | NDF | 0.86% | UPFA | 30.34% |
| 2005 | UNP | UNP | 5.08% | UPFA | 30.08% |
| 1999 | PA | PA | 0.82% | PA | 3.11% |
| 1994 | PA | PA | 4.64% | PA | 28.21% |
| 1988 | SLFP | SLFP | 6.09% | UNP | 17.38% |
| 1982 | SLFP | ACTC | 16.82% | UNP | 28.26% |
| Matches/Mean MAE | 3/8 | 3/8 | 4.74% | 8/8 | 25.90% |

=== 2019 Sri Lankan Presidential Election ===
| Party | Kopay | | Jaffna Electoral District | | Sri Lanka | |
| Party | Votes | % | Votes | % | Votes | % |
|---|---|---|---|---|---|---|
| NDF | 30,835 | 83.44% | 312,722 | 83.86% | 5,564,239 | 41.99% |
| Other Parties (with < 1%) | 2,901 | 7.85% | 23,295 | 6.25% | 717,212 | 5.41% |
| SLPP | 1,858 | 5.03% | 23,261 | 6.24% | 6,924,255 | 52.25% |
| DUNF | 897 | 2.43% | 6,790 | 1.82% | 34,537 | 0.26% |
| IND10 | 462 | 1.25% | 6,845 | 1.84% | 12,256 | 0.09% |
| Valid Votes | 36,953 | 97.18% | 372,913 | 97.07% | 13,252,499 | 98.99% |
| Rejected Votes | 1,074 | 2.82% | 11,251 | 2.93% | 135,452 | 1.01% |
| Total Polled | 38,027 | 65.89% | 384,164 | 68.00% | 13,387,951 | 83.71% |
| Registered Electors | 57,711 | | 564,984 | | 15,992,568 | |

=== 2015 Sri Lankan Presidential Election ===
| Party | Kopay | | Jaffna Electoral District | | Sri Lanka | |
| Party | Votes | % | Votes | % | Votes | % |
|---|---|---|---|---|---|---|
| NDF | 27,161 | 77.44% | 253,574 | 74.42% | 6,217,162 | 51.28% |
| UPFA | 6,211 | 17.71% | 74,454 | 21.85% | 5,768,090 | 47.58% |
| Other Parties (with < 1%) | 1,702 | 4.85% | 12,723 | 3.73% | 138,200 | 1.14% |
| Valid Votes | 35,074 | 96.86% | 340,751 | 97.14% | 12,123,452 | 98.85% |
| Rejected Votes | 1,138 | 3.14% | 10,038 | 2.86% | 140,925 | 1.15% |
| Total Polled | 36,212 | 64.79% | 350,789 | 64.22% | 12,264,377 | 78.69% |
| Registered Electors | 55,891 | | 546,265 | | 15,585,942 | |

=== 2010 Sri Lankan Presidential Election ===
| Party | Kopay | | Jaffna Electoral District | | Sri Lanka | |
| Party | Votes | % | Votes | % | Votes | % |
|---|---|---|---|---|---|---|
| NDF | 13,151 | 64.13% | 113,877 | 63.84% | 4,173,185 | 40.15% |
| UPFA | 4,538 | 22.13% | 44,154 | 24.75% | 6,015,934 | 57.88% |
| Other Parties (with < 1%) | 1,514 | 7.38% | 10,438 | 5.85% | 132,316 | 1.27% |
| DUNF | 528 | 2.57% | 3,370 | 1.89% | 39,226 | 0.38% |
| UDF | 471 | 2.30% | 3,325 | 1.86% | 23,290 | 0.22% |
| Ind 5 | 306 | 1.49% | 3,205 | 1.80% | 9,662 | 0.09% |
| Valid Votes | 20,508 | 97.04% | 178,369 | 96.35% | 10,393,613 | 99.03% |
| Rejected Votes | 625 | 2.96% | 6,763 | 3.65% | 101,838 | 0.97% |
| Total Polled | 21,133 | 32.12% | 185,132 | 25.15% | 10,495,451 | 66.70% |
| Registered Electors | 65,798 | | 736,032 | | 15,734,587 | |

=== 2005 Sri Lankan Presidential Election ===
| Party | Kopay | | Jaffna Electoral District | | Sri Lanka | |
| Party | Votes | % | Votes | % | Votes | % |
|---|---|---|---|---|---|---|
| UNP | 267 | 73.76% | 5,523 | 70.20% | 4,706,366 | 48.43% |
| UPFA | 54 | 14.92% | 1,967 | 25.00% | 4,887,152 | 50.29% |
| USP | 14 | 3.87% | 72 | 0.92% | 35,425 | 0.36% |
| Other Parties (with < 1%) | 9 | 2.49% | 212 | 2.69% | 34,566 | 0.36% |
| JSP | 5 | 1.38% | 34 | 0.43% | 31,238 | 0.32% |
| NLF | 5 | 1.38% | 24 | 0.31% | 9,296 | 0.10% |
| ULF | 4 | 1.10% | 21 | 0.27% | 6,357 | 0.07% |
| SLNF | 4 | 1.10% | 15 | 0.19% | 6,639 | 0.07% |
| Valid Votes | 362 | 93.30% | 7,868 | 92.30% | 9,717,039 | 98.88% |
| Rejected Votes | 26 | 6.70% | 656 | 7.70% | 109,869 | 1.12% |
| Total Polled | 388 | 0.61% | 8,524 | 1.20% | 9,826,908 | 69.51% |
| Registered Electors | 63,752 | | 707,970 | | 14,136,979 | |

=== 1999 Sri Lankan Presidential Election ===
| Party | Kopay | | Jaffna Electoral District | | Sri Lanka | |
| Party | Votes | % | Votes | % | Votes | % |
|---|---|---|---|---|---|---|
| PA | 6,607 | 46.29% | 52,043 | 46.65% | 4,312,157 | 51.12% |
| UNP | 5,941 | 41.62% | 48,005 | 43.03% | 3,602,748 | 42.71% |
| Other Parties (with < 1%) | 632 | 4.43% | 3,847 | 3.45% | 427,442 | 5.07% |
| Ind 2 | 335 | 2.35% | 1,873 | 1.68% | 27,052 | 0.32% |
| LDA | 332 | 2.33% | 3,394 | 3.04% | 23,668 | 0.28% |
| Liberal | 265 | 1.86% | 1,368 | 1.23% | 25,085 | 0.30% |
| SLMP | 161 | 1.13% | 1,041 | 0.93% | 17,359 | 0.21% |
| Valid Votes | 14,273 | 96.11% | 111,568 | 94.91% | 8,435,754 | 97.69% |
| Rejected Votes | 577 | 3.89% | 5,981 | 5.09% | 199,536 | 2.31% |
| Total Polled | 14,850 | 25.28% | 117,549 | 19.15% | 8,635,290 | 72.17% |
| Registered Electors | 58,751 | | 613,718 | | 11,965,536 | |

=== 1994 Sri Lankan Presidential Election ===
| Party | Kopay | | Jaffna Electoral District | | Sri Lanka | |
| Party | Votes | % | Votes | % | Votes | % |
|---|---|---|---|---|---|---|
| PA | 11 | 91.67% | 16,934 | 96.35% | 4,709,205 | 62.28% |
| UNP | 1 | 8.33% | 223 | 1.27% | 2,715,283 | 35.91% |
| Valid Votes | 12 | 100.00% | 17,575 | 99.20% | 7,561,526 | 98.03% |

=== 1988 Sri Lankan Presidential Election ===
| Party | Kopay | | Jaffna Electoral District | | Sri Lanka | |
| Party | Votes | % | Votes | % | Votes | % |
|---|---|---|---|---|---|---|
| SLFP | 5,833 | 46.11% | 44,197 | 36.82% | 2,289,857 | 44.95% |
| SLMP | 4,325 | 34.19% | 42,198 | 35.15% | 235,701 | 4.63% |
| UNP | 2,493 | 19.71% | 33,650 | 28.03% | 2,569,199 | 50.43% |
| Valid Votes | 12,651 | 94.52% | 120,045 | 93.38% | 5,094,754 | 98.24% |
| Rejected Votes | 733 | 5.48% | 8,517 | 6.62% | 91,499 | 1.76% |
| Total Polled | 13,384 | 23.71% | 128,562 | 23.30% | 5,186,256 | 55.87% |
| Registered Electors | 56,450 | | 551,713 | | 9,283,143 | |

=== 1982 Sri Lankan Presidential Election ===
| Party | Kopay | | Jaffna Electoral District | | Sri Lanka | |
| Party | Votes | % | Votes | % | Votes | % |
|---|---|---|---|---|---|---|
| SLFP | 13,678 | 58.75% | 77,210 | 35.42% | 2,546,348 | 39.05% |
| ACTC | 4,984 | 21.41% | 87,263 | 40.03% | 173,934 | 2.67% |
| UNP | 3,546 | 15.23% | 44,775 | 20.54% | 3,450,815 | 52.93% |
| LSSP | 423 | 1.82% | 3,376 | 1.55% | 58,531 | 0.90% |
| JVP | 379 | 1.63% | 3,098 | 1.42% | 273,428 | 4.19% |
| Other Parties (with < 1%) | 182 | 0.78% | 2,176 | 1.00% | 16,995 | 0.26% |
| Valid Votes | 23,282 | 95.79% | 218,003 | 95.36% | 6,520,156 | 98.78% |
| Rejected Votes | 1,023 | 4.21% | 10,610 | 4.64% | 80,470 | 1.22% |
| Total Polled | 24,305 | 49.02% | 228,613 | 45.86% | 6,600,626 | 80.15% |
| Registered Electors | 49,577 | | 498,545 | | 8,235,358 | |

== Parliamentary Election Results ==
=== Summary ===
The winner of Kopay has matched the final country result 0 out of 7 times.

| Year | Kopay | Jaffna Electoral District | MAE % | Sri Lanka | MAE % |
|---|---|---|---|---|---|
| 2015 | ITAK | ITAK | 0.46% | UNP | 35.42% |
| 2010 | ITAK | ITAK | 3.27% | UPFA | 27.67% |
| 2004 | ITAK | ITAK | 0.30% | UPFA | 6.17% |
| 2001 | TULF | TULF | 1.87% | UNP | 20.30% |
| 2000 | EPDP | EPDP | 1.65% | PA | 14.28% |
| 1994 | IND2 | IND2 | 10.81% | PA | 0.36% |
| 1989 | INDI | INDI | 1.32% | UNP | 27.61% |
| Matches/Mean MAE | 0/7 | 0/7 | 2.81% | 7/7 | 18.83% |

=== 2015 Sri Lankan Parliamentary Election ===
| Party | Kopay | | Jaffna Electoral District | | Sri Lanka | |
| Party | Votes | % | Votes | % | Votes | % |
|---|---|---|---|---|---|---|
| ITAK | 20,925 | 70.02% | 207,577 | 70.08% | 515,963 | 4.63% |
| UPFA | 2,699 | 9.03% | 17,309 | 5.84% | 4,732,664 | 42.48% |
| EPDP | 2,588 | 8.66% | 30,232 | 10.21% | 33,481 | 0.30% |
| UNP | 1,983 | 6.64% | 20,025 | 6.76% | 5,098,916 | 45.77% |
| AITC | 1,130 | 3.78% | 15,022 | 5.07% | 18,644 | 0.17% |
| Other Parties (with < 1%) | 560 | 1.87% | 6,034 | 2.04% | 580,476 | 5.21% |
| Valid Votes | 29,885 | 89.94% | 296,199 | 90.91% | 11,140,333 | 95.35% |
| Rejected Votes | 2,938 | 8.84% | 25,496 | 7.83% | 516,926 | 4.42% |
| Total Polled | 33,227 | 59.45% | 325,805 | 61.56% | 11,684,111 | 77.66% |
| Registered Electors | 55,891 | | 529,239 | | 15,044,490 | |

=== 2010 Sri Lankan Parliamentary Election ===
| Party | Kopay | | Jaffna Electoral District | | Sri Lanka | |
| Party | Votes | % | Votes | % | Votes | % |
|---|---|---|---|---|---|---|
| ITAK | 7,467 | 47.76% | 65,119 | 44.03% | 233,190 | 2.91% |
| UPFA | 4,377 | 28.00% | 47,622 | 32.20% | 4,846,388 | 60.38% |
| UNP | 1,122 | 7.18% | 12,624 | 8.54% | 2,357,057 | 29.37% |
| Other Parties (with < 1%) | 506 | 3.24% | 4,460 | 3.02% | 477,689 | 5.95% |
| IG6J | 451 | 2.88% | 1,038 | 0.70% | 1,038 | 0.01% |
| IG1J | 426 | 2.73% | 2,648 | 1.79% | 2,648 | 0.03% |
| AITC | 370 | 2.37% | 6,362 | 4.30% | 7,544 | 0.09% |
| PERLF | 311 | 1.99% | 1,821 | 1.23% | 2,100 | 0.03% |
| IG3J | 223 | 1.43% | 1,161 | 0.79% | 1,161 | 0.01% |
| IG4J | 215 | 1.38% | 2,151 | 1.45% | 2,151 | 0.03% |
| TULF | 165 | 1.06% | 2,892 | 1.96% | 9,223 | 0.11% |
| Valid Votes | 15,633 | 88.30% | 147,898 | 87.89% | 8,026,322 | 96.03% |
| Rejected Votes | 2,021 | 11.41% | 19,774 | 11.75% | 581,465 | 6.96% |
| Total Polled | 17,705 | 26.91% | 168,277 | 22.68% | 8,358,246 | 59.29% |
| Registered Electors | 65,798 | | 742,005 | | 14,097,690 | |

=== 2004 Sri Lankan Parliamentary Election ===
| Party | Kopay | | Jaffna Electoral District | | Sri Lanka | |
| Party | Votes | % | Votes | % | Votes | % |
|---|---|---|---|---|---|---|
| ITAK | 26,805 | 90.88% | 257,320 | 90.60% | 633,203 | 6.85% |
| EPDP | 2,108 | 7.15% | 18,612 | 6.55% | 24,942 | 0.27% |
| IP1D | 453 | 1.54% | 5,156 | 1.82% | 6,121 | 0.07% |
| Other Parties (with < 1%) | 129 | 0.44% | 2,938 | 1.03% | 764,786 | 8.28% |
| Valid Votes | 29,495 | 92.35% | 284,026 | 93.04% | 9,241,931 | 94.52% |
| Rejected Votes | 2,445 | 7.65% | 21,233 | 6.96% | 534,452 | 5.47% |
| Total Polled | 31,940 | 52.02% | 305,259 | 46.65% | 9,777,821 | 75.74% |
| Registered Electors | 61,403 | | 654,415 | | 12,909,631 | |

=== 2001 Sri Lankan Parliamentary Election ===
| Party | Kopay | | Jaffna Electoral District | | Sri Lanka | |
| Party | Votes | % | Votes | % | Votes | % |
|---|---|---|---|---|---|---|
| TULF | 12,539 | 56.84% | 102,324 | 54.84% | 348,164 | 3.89% |
| EPDP | 6,300 | 28.56% | 57,208 | 30.66% | 72,783 | 0.81% |
| UNP | 1,753 | 7.95% | 16,245 | 8.71% | 4,086,026 | 45.62% |
| DLF | 689 | 3.12% | 2,054 | 1.10% | 6,214 | 0.07% |
| Other Parties (with < 1%) | 454 | 2.06% | 7,313 | 3.92% | 1,029,620 | 11.50% |
| DPLF | 326 | 1.48% | 1,454 | 0.78% | 16,669 | 0.19% |
| Valid Votes | 22,061 | 94.22% | 186,598 | 94.59% | 8,955,844 | 94.77% |
| Rejected Votes | 1,354 | 5.78% | 10,681 | 5.41% | 494,009 | 5.23% |
| Total Polled | 23,415 | 38.18% | 197,279 | 31.14% | 9,449,878 | 76.03% |
| Registered Electors | 61,334 | | 633,457 | | 12,428,762 | |

=== 2000 Sri Lankan Parliamentary Election ===
| Party | Kopay | | Jaffna Electoral District | | Sri Lanka | |
| Party | Votes | % | Votes | % | Votes | % |
|---|---|---|---|---|---|---|
| EPDP | 5,044 | 33.77% | 41,536 | 36.13% | 50,702 | 0.59% |
| TULF | 4,248 | 28.44% | 32,761 | 28.50% | 105,907 | 1.23% |
| UNP | 1,051 | 7.04% | 10,896 | 9.48% | 3,451,765 | 40.12% |
| ACTC | 891 | 5.97% | 10,618 | 9.24% | 27,289 | 0.32% |
| DPLF | 867 | 5.81% | 4,778 | 4.16% | 20,655 | 0.24% |
| IG2 | 829 | 5.55% | 4,905 | 4.27% | 31,443 | 0.37% |
| L&DA | 825 | 5.52% | 2,502 | 2.18% | 9,781 | 0.11% |
| IG1 | 548 | 3.67% | 1,641 | 1.43% | 9,799 | 0.11% |
| Other Parties (with < 1%) | 391 | 2.62% | 3,701 | 3.22% | 880,882 | 10.24% |
| IG3 | 241 | 1.61% | 1,633 | 1.42% | 6,109 | 0.07% |
| Valid Votes | 14,935 | N/A | 114,971 | N/A | 8,602,617 | N/A |

=== 1994 Sri Lankan Parliamentary Election ===
| Party | Kopay | | Jaffna Electoral District | | Sri Lanka | |
| Party | Votes | % | Votes | % | Votes | % |
|---|---|---|---|---|---|---|
| IND2 | 40 | 70.18% | 10,744 | 79.71% | 16,690 | 0.21% |
| IND1 | 17 | 29.82% | 374 | 2.77% | 48,199 | 0.61% |
| Valid Votes | 57 | 95.00% | 13,479 | 97.41% | 7,943,688 | 95.20% |
| Rejected Votes | 3 | 5.00% | 358 | 2.59% | 400,395 | 4.80% |
| Total Polled | 60 | 0.11% | 13,837 | 2.32% | 8,344,095 | 74.75% |
| Registered Electors | 56,496 | | 596,375 | | 11,163,064 | |

=== 1989 Sri Lankan Parliamentary Election ===
| Party | Kopay | | Jaffna Electoral District | | Sri Lanka | |
| Party | Votes | % | Votes | % | Votes | % |
|---|---|---|---|---|---|---|
| INDI | 17,846 | 64.37% | 150,340 | 62.68% | 175,579 | 3.14% |
| TULF | 6,717 | 24.23% | 60,013 | 25.02% | 188,594 | 3.37% |
| DPLF | 1,073 | 3.87% | 7,993 | 3.33% | 19,150 | 0.34% |
| ACTC | 852 | 3.07% | 7,610 | 3.17% | 7,610 | 0.14% |
| SLMC | 815 | 2.94% | 8,439 | 3.52% | 202,016 | 3.61% |
| UNP | 421 | 1.52% | 5,460 | 2.28% | 2,838,005 | 50.71% |
| Valid Votes | 27,724 | 90.37% | 239,855 | 90.49% | 5,596,468 | 93.87% |
| Rejected Votes | 2,954 | 9.63% | 25,203 | 9.51% | 365,563 | 6.13% |
| Total Polled | 30,678 | 54.38% | 265,058 | 44.76% | 5,962,031 | 63.60% |
| Registered Electors | 56,413 | | 592,210 | | 9,374,164 | |

== Demographics ==
=== Ethnicity ===
The Kopay Polling Division has a Sri Lankan Tamil majority (99.4%) . In comparison, the Jaffna Electoral District (which contains the Kopay Polling Division) has a Sri Lankan Tamil majority (98.6%)

Ethnicity in Kopay
1. Sri Lankan Tamil (99.4%)
2. Other (0.60%)

=== Religion ===
The Kopay Polling Division has a Hindu majority (90.9%) . In comparison, the Jaffna Electoral District (which contains the Kopay Polling Division) has a Hindu majority (82.6%) and a significant Roman Catholic population (12.6%)

Religion in Kopay
1. Hindu (90.9%)
2. Roman Catholic (5.60%)
3. Other Christian (3.10%)
4. Other (0.40%)
