= 14th Parliament of Sri Lanka =

2010–2015 meeting of the Sri Lankan legislature

←	13th	15th	→

Overview
- Legislative body: Parliament of Sri Lanka
- Meeting place: Sri Lankan Parliament Building
- Term: 22 April 2010 – 26 June 2015
- Election: 8 and 20 April 2010
- Website: parliament.lk

Parliamentarians
- Members: 225
- Speaker: Chamal Rajapaksa, UPFA
- Deputy Speaker and Chairman of Committees: Piyankara Jayaratne, UPFA (2010); Chandima Weerakkody, UPFA (2010–15)
- Deputy Chairman of Committees: Murugesu Chandrakumar, UPFA
- Prime Minister: D. M. Jayaratne, UPFA (2010–15); Ranil Wickremesinghe, UNP (2015)
- Leader of the Opposition: Ranil Wickremesinghe, UNF (2010–15); Nimal Siripala de Silva, UPFA (2015)
- Leader of the House: Nimal Siripala de Silva, UPFA (2010–15); Lakshman Kiriella, UNP (2015)
- Chief Government Whip: Dinesh Gunawardena, UPFA (2010–15); Gayantha Karunatileka, UNP (2015)
- Chief Opposition Whip: John Amaratunga, UNF (2010–15); John Senewiratne, UPFA (2015)

Sessions
- 1st: 22 April 2010 – 26 June 2015

The 14th Parliament of Sri Lanka, known officially as the 7th Parliament of the Democratic Socialist Republic of Sri Lanka, was a meeting of the Parliament of Sri Lanka, with the membership determined by the results of the 2010 parliamentary election held on 8 and 20 April 2010. The parliament met for the first time on 22 April 2010 and was dissolved on 26 June 2015.

== Election ==
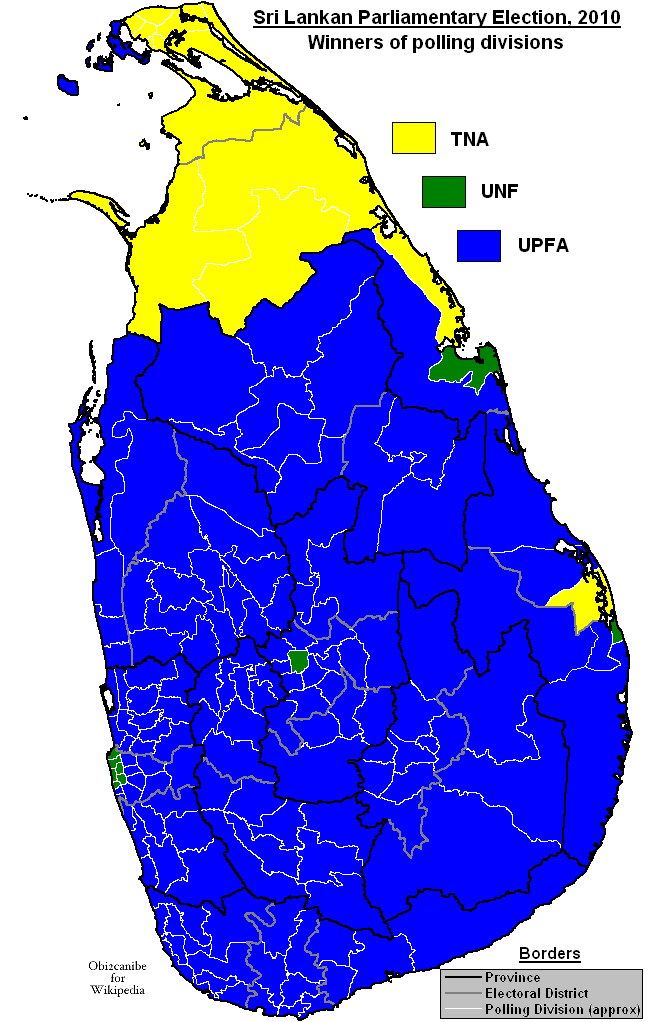
Winners of polling divisions. UPFA in blue, UNF in green and TNA in yellow.

The 14th parliamentary election was held on 8 April and 20 April 2010. The incumbent United People's Freedom Alliance (UPFA) secured a landslide victory in the elections, buoyed by its achievement of ending the 26-year Sri Lankan Civil War by defeating the Liberation Tigers of Tamil Eelam in May 2009. The UPFA won a large majority in parliament, obtaining 144 seats, an increase of 39 since the 13th parliamentary election. The United National Front (UNF), the main opposition party, won 60 seats, a decline of 22. The minority Tamil party Tamil National Alliance (TNA) won 14 seats, a decline of 8, and the Democratic National Alliance (DNA), contesting for the first time, won 7 seats.

=== Results ===
Party	Votes	%	Seats		
Party	Votes	%	District	National	Total
United People's Freedom Alliance (Note: Consisting of the All Ceylon Muslim Congress, the Ceylon Workers' Congress, the Eelam People's Democratic Party (which contested separately in Vanni), Jathika Hela Urumaya, Mahajana Eksath Peramuna, the National Congress, the National Freedom Front, the Socialist Alliance (the Communist Party of Sri Lanka, the Democratic Left Front, Lanka Sama Samaja Party, the National Liberation People's Party and the Sri Lanka People's Party), the Sri Lanka Freedom Party and the Up-Country People's Front (which contested separately in Badulla and Nuwara Eliya).)	4,846,388	60.33	127	17	144
United National Front (Note: Contested under the name and symbol of United National Party. It also included the Citizen's Front, the Democratic People's Front, the National Union of Workers and the Sri Lanka Muslim Congress).)	2,357,057	29.34	51	9	60
Democratic National Alliance (Note: Including Janatha Vimukthi Peramuna.)	441,251	5.49	5	2	7
Tamil National Alliance (Note: Contested under the name and symbol of Illankai Tamil Arasu Kachchi. It also consisted of the Eelam People's Revolutionary Liberation Front and the Tamil Eelam Liberation Organization.)	233,190	2.90	13	1	14
Up-Country People's Front	24,670	0.31	0	0	0
Tamil Makkal Viduthalai Pulikal	20,284	0.25	0	0	0
Sinhalaye Mahasammatha Bhoomiputra Pakshaya	12,170	0.15	0	0	0
Tamil United Liberation Front	9,223	0.11	0	0	0
Tamil National People's Front (Note: Contested under the name and symbol of All Ceylon Tamil Congress.)	7,544	0.09	0	0	0
Democratic People's Liberation Front (Note: Including the People's Liberation Organisation of Tamil Eelam.)	6,036	0.08	0	0	0
Sri Lanka National Front	5,313	0.07	0	0	0
Eelavar Democratic Front	3,709	0.05	0	0	0
Jathika Sangwardhena Peramuna	3,358	0.04	0	0	0
Eelam People's Democratic Party	2,867	0.04	0	0	0
Our National Front	2,647	0.03	0	0	0
United National Alternative Front	2,454	0.03	0	0	0
Eksath Lanka Podujana Pakshaya	2,387	0.03	0	0	0
Left Liberation Front	2,386	0.03	0	0	0
United Socialist Party	2,192	0.03	0	0	0
Pathmanabha Eelam Revolutionary Liberation Front	2,100	0.03	0	0	0
Jana Setha Peramuna	1,501	0.02	0	0	0
United Democratic Front	1,497	0.02	0	0	0
Democratic Unity Alliance	1,270	0.02	0	0	0
Eksath Lanka Maha Sabha	673	0.01	0	0	0
Patriotic National Front	558	0.01	0	0	0
Okkoma Wasiyo Okkoma Rajawaru Sanvidanaya	476	0.01	0	0	0
Socialist Equality Party	371	0.00	0	0	0
Sri Lanka Labour Party	338	0.00	0	0	0
National Peoples Party	164	0.00	0	0	0
Muslim National Alliance	147	0.00	0	0	0
The Liberal Party	131	0.00	0	0	0
Muslim Liberation Front	130	0.00	0	0	0
Ruhunu Janatha Party	109	0.00	0	0	0
Akila Ilankai Tamil United Front	85	0.00	0	0	0
Ceylon Democratic Unity Alliance	75	0.00	0	0	0
New Sinhala Heritage	19	0.00	0	0	0
Independents	38,947	0.48	0	0	0
Total	8,033,717	100.00	196	29	225
Valid votes	8,033,717	93.08			
Invalid/blank votes	596,972	6.92			
Total votes	8,630,689	100.00			
Registered voters/turnout	14,088,500	61.26			
Source: Election Commission, Election Commission

The new parliament was sworn in on 22 April 2010. Chamal Rajapaksa, brother of President Mahinda Rajapaksa, was elected Speaker, Piyankara Jayaratne as the Deputy Speaker and Murugesu Chandrakumar as the Deputy Chairman of Committees. Ranil Wickremesinghe was recognised as the Leader of the Opposition. John Amaratunga was appointed as the Chief Opposition Whip.

On 2 May 2010 the government appointed Nimal Siripala de Silva as the Leader of the House and Dinesh Gunawardena as the Chief Government Whip.

Chandima Weerakkody was elected Deputy Speaker on 23 November 2010 after his predecessor Piyankara Jayaratne was made a minister.

== Government ==
On 21 April 2010, President Mahinda Rajapaksa appointed D. M. Jayaratne as the new Prime Minister. The rest of the government, comprising 36 ministers and 39 deputy ministers, was sworn in on 23 April 2010. President Rajapaksa has retained control of the important ministries of Defence, Finance and Planning, Highways, and Ports and Aviation.

Mervyn Silva resigned as Deputy Minister of Mass Media & Information on 5 May 2010. A further four Ministers and five Deputy Ministers were sworn in on 5 May 2010. Mervyn Silva was appointed as the new Deputy Minister of Highways. 85 UPFA MPs were now part of the government.

Mervyn Silva was dismissed from his ministerial post and suspended from the SLFP on 10 August 2010. However, a subsequent SLFP disciplinary cleared him of all charges and on 8 September 2010 he was reappointed to his ministerial post.

On 22 November 2010, three days after Rajapaksa was sworn in for his second presidential term, a new government was sworn in. A number of opposition MPs who had defected to the UPFA were rewarded with ministerial posts. A further minister and three deputy ministers were sworn in on 25 November 2010. 95 UPFA MPs were now part of the government.

S. M. Chandrasena resigned as Minister of Agrarian Services & Wildlife with effect from 26 September 2012. He was appointed Deputy Minister of Agrarian Services & Wildlife on 5 October 2012.

President Rajapaksa carried out a cabinet re-shuffle on 28 January 2013, appointing some new ministers and deputy ministers. 96 UPFA MPs were now part of the government. Nine new deputy ministers were appointed on 10 October 2013. 105 UPFA MPs were now part of the government (Prime Minister + 10 senior ministers + 54 ministers + 2 project ministers + 38 deputy ministers (excluding Sarath Amunugama who is also a Senior Minister)).

Deputy Economic Development Minister S. M. Chandrasena was appointed as Cabinet Minister for Special Projects on 23 November 2013. Palani Digambaran and Praba Ganesan were appointed deputy ministers on 21 August 2014. V. Radhakrishnan was appointed deputy minister on 9 October 2014.

Maithripala Sirisena defeated Mahinda Rajapaksa in the 2015 presidential election, after which he appointed a UNP-dominated national government (NG).

== Legislation ==
2010

- 13 July: Appropriation Act
- 17 August: Widows' and Orphans' Pension fund (Amendment)
- 17 August: Widowers' and Orphans' Pension (Amendment)
- 18 August: Judicature (Amendment)
- 9 September: 18th Amendment to the Constitution
- 5 October: Civil Procedure Code (Amendment)
- 6 October: National Institute of Labour Act
- 30 October: Provincial Council Act
- 3 November: Civil Aviation Act
- 7 December: Secretary to the Treasury (Nomination of Representative)
- 7 December: Default Taxes (Special Provisions)
- 7 December: Casino Business (Regulation)
- 7 December: Public Enterprises Reform Commission of Sri Lanka
- 10 December: Registration of Deaths
- 10 December: Appropriation Act

2011

- 28 January: Recovery of Loans by Banks Act
- 28 January: Offensive Weapons Act
- 7 February: Regulation of Insurance Industry (Amendment)
- 23 February: Mediation Boards (Amendment)
- 23 February: Protection of the Rights of Elders (Amendment)
- 23 February: Rohitha Abeygunawardana Foundation (Incorporation)
- 23 February: Tharunyata Hetak Organization (Incorporation)
- 22 March: Red Lotus Organization for Humanitarian Services (Incorporation)
- 31 March: Value Added Tax (Amendment)
- 31 March: Nation Building Tax (Amendment)
- 31 March: Economic Service Charge
- 31 March: Strategic Development Project
- 31 March: Provincial Councils (Transfer of Stamp duty)
- 31 March: Debits Tax
- 31 March: Finance (Amendment)
- 31 March: Regional Infrastructure Development Levy (Repeal)
- 31 March: Excise (Special Provisions) (Amendment)
- 31 March: Ports and Airports Development Levy
- 31 March: Recovery of Loans by Banks (Special Provisions) (Amendment)
- 31 March: Excise (Amendment)
- 31 March: Telecommunication Levy
- 31 March: Inland Revenue (Amendment)

2012

- 17 January: Ramakrishna Sarada Mission (Incorporation)
- 9 February: Employee's Provident Fund
- 15 February: Board of Investment of Sri Lanka (Amendment)
- 15 February: Tax Appeals Commission
- 21 February: Central Colleges Past Pupils' Association of Sri Lanka (Incorporation)
- 8 March: Rahula College Matara
- 30 March: Value Added Tex
- 30 March: Inland Revenue (Amendment)
- 30 March: Nation Building Tax (Amendment)
- 30 March: Ports and Airport
- 30 March: Economic Service Charge (Amendment)
- 30 March: Finance
- 4 May: Defence Services Command and Staff College (Amendment)
- 6 June: T. B. Ekanayake Foundation (Incorporation)
- 11 July: Buddhasravaka Bikku University (Amendment)
- 6 August: Organization for the Eraction of Balana Buddha Statue (Incorporation)
- 6 August: D. M. Dasanayake Social Service and Charity Foundation
- 6 August: Dr. Malani Fonseka Foundation
- 6 August: Piya Dasuna Foundation
- 8 October: Ranaviru Seva Authority (Amendment)
- 15 November: Local Authority (Special)
- 15 November: Local Authority Election (Amendment)
- 8 December: Appropriation Act

2013

- 11 January: Divinaguma
- 6 February: Code of Criminal Procedure
- 12 February: Convention of the suppression of Terrorist Financing
- 21 February: Society of the Ceylonese Brothers of St. Joseph
- 22 March: Ports and Airports Developments Levy (Amendment)
- 22 March: Economic Service Charge (Amendment)
- 22 March: Excise (Amendment)
- 22 March: Telecommunication Levy (Amendment)
- 22 March: Customs (Amendment)
- 28 March: Resettlement Authority (Amendment)
- 23 April: Nation Building
- 23 April: Finance Act
- 23 April: Notaries (Amendment)
- 23 April: Powers of Attorney
- 23 April: Fiscal Management (Responsibility) (Amendment)
- 23 April: Strategic Development Projects
- 23 April: Value Added Tax
- 24 April: Inland Revenue
- 24 April: Betting and Gaming Levy (Amendment)
- 24 April: Tax Appeals Commission
- 24 April: Registration of Documents
- 8 May: Marriage Registration (Amendment)
- 8 May: Kandyan Marriage and Divorce
- 8 May: Muslim Marriage and Divorce (Amendment)
- 8 May: Births and Deaths Registration
- 21 May: Hanguranketha Madanwala Rajamaha Vihara Development Foundation
- 20 June: Registration of Electors (Special Provisions)
- 8 July: Parliamentary Scholarship Board (Repeal)
- 8 July: Defence Services Command and Staff College (Amendment)
- 12 July: Local Authorities filling of vacancies
- 7 August: Sri Lanka Electricity (Amendment)
- 25 October: Science and Technology Development (Amendment)
- 11 November: Convention Against Doping in Sport
- 11 November: Buddhist Temporalities (Amendment)
- 22 November: Fisheries and Aquatic Resources (Amendment)
- 20 December: Appropriation

2014

- 6 February: Institute of Policy Studies of Sri Lanka (Amendment)
- 21 February: National Institute of Business Management (Amendment)
- 4 March: Institute of Geology, Sri Lanka (Incorporation)
- 4 March: Philip Gunawardena Commemorative Society (Incorporation)
- 4 March: Chandima Weerakkody Foundation (Incorporation)
- 10 April: Medical (Amendment)
- 24 April: Value Added Tax
- 24 April: Inland Revenue (Amendment)
- 24 April: Economic Service Charge (Amendment)
- 24 April: Nation Building Tax (Amendment)
- 24 April: Telecommunication Levy (Amendment)
- 24 April: Special Commodity Levy (Amendment)
- 24 April: Companies Act (Amendment)
- 24 April: Default Taxes (Special Provisions) (Amendment)
- 24 April: Monetary Law (Amendment)
- 24 April: Samastha Lanka Sasanarakshaka Mandalaya (Incorporation)
- 24 April: The Rehabilitation of Buddhist Temples Foundation (Incorporation)
- 4 June: National Enterprise Development Authority (Amendment)
- 17 June: Kumarasiri Hettige Foundation (Incorporation)
- 17 June: Mohan Lal Grero Foundation (Incorporation)
- 17 June: Victor Antony Foundation (Incorporation)
- 23 July: Dampe, Meegoda, Bodhiwardhanarama Sri Madurasama Pirivena
  Viharastha Sanwardhana Sabhawa (Incorporation)
- 23 July: Nimal Siripala De Silva Foundation (Incorporation)
- 23 July: Lakshman Wasantha Perera Community Development Foundation (Incorporation)
- 8 August: Institute of Fundamental Studies, Sri Lanka (Amendment)
- 8 August: Prescription (Amendment)
- 20 August: John Seneviratne Foundation (Incorporation)
- 21 August: Bodirajarama Educational and Cultural Founcation (Incorporation)
- 21 August: Vasantha Senanayake Foundation (Incorporation)
- 21 August: Roman Catholic Archbishop and Bishops of Ceylon (Amendment)
- 7 September: Ocean University of Sri Lanka
- 7 September: Piyasena Gamage Foundation (Incorporation)
- 16 October: Construction Industry Development Act
- 23 October: Municipal Councils (Amendment)

2014 (continued)

- 23 October: Urban Councils (Amendment)
- 23 October: Pradeshiya Sabhas (Amendment)
- 23 October: Local Authorities filling of vacancies (Special Provisions) (Amendment)
- 29 October: Land (Restrictions on Alienation)
- 1 November: DFCC Bank (Repeal and Consequential Provisions)
- 4 November: Sri Lanka Atomic Energy
- 24 November: Appropriation
- 24 November: Kalpawaruksha Development Foundation (Incorporation)
- 24 November: Sivmuni Se Vehera Buddhist Foundation (Incorporation)
- 24 November: P. Harrison Community Development Foundation (Incorporation)
- 24 November: Welfare Society of the School for the Mentally Subnormal
  Child (Incorporation) (Amendment)
- 24 November: Sri Lanka Association of Professional Social Workers (Incorporation)
- 25 November: Appropriation (Amendment)

2015

- 7 February: Appropriation (Amendment)
- 2 March: Fisheries and Aquatic Resources (Amendment)
- 3 March: National Authority on Tobacco and Alcohol (Amendment)
- 7 March: Assistance to and Protection of Victims of Crime and Witnesses
- 19 March: National Medicines Regulatory Authority
- 15 May: 19th Amendment to the Constitution
- 3 June: Immigrants & Emigrants (Amendment)

== Composition ==
Date	Government	Opposition	Vacant	Total
22 April 2010	144	81	0	225
5 August 2010	146	79	0	225
8 September 2010	153	72	0	225
7 October 2010	153	71	1	225
22 November 2010	161	63	1	225
2 December 2010	160	63	2	225
5 January 2011	161	63	1	225
8 March 2011	161	64	0	225
30 November 2011	162	63	0	225
24 September 2012	161	63	1	225
9 October 2012	162	63	0	225
30 May 2013	162	62	1	225
4 June 2013	162	63	0	225
24 July 2013	162	62	1	225
8 August 2013	162	63	0	225
5 August 2014	162	62	1	225
8 August 2014	162	63	0	225
18 November 2014	159	66	0	225
20 November 2014	158	67	0	225
21 November 2014	152	73	0	225
26 November 2014	151	74	0	225
28 November 2014	150	74	1	225
30 November 2014	149	75	1	225
8 December 2014	151	73	1	225
10 December 2014	149	75	1	225
12 December 2014	150	75	0	225
22 December 2014	148	77	0	225
28 December 2014	140	85	0	225
31 December 2014	139	86	0	225
1 January 2015	138	87	0	225
9 January 2015	67	158	0	225
17 March 2015	66	159	0	225
22 March 2015	93	132	0	225
2 April 2015	92	133	0	225
5 April 2015	93	132	0	225
12 May 2015	92	132	1	225
20 May 2015	92	133	0	225
21 May 2015	88	137	0	225
29 May 2015	91	134	0	225
10 June 2015	95	130	0	225

Light shading indicates majority (113 seats or more); dark shading indicates two-thirds majority (150 seats or more); no shading indicates minority government.
- 22 April 2010 – Palani Digambaran, the sole NUW MP, leaves the UNF alliance to function as an independent MP following a dispute over National List seats.
- 4 August 2010 – SLFP (People's wing) dissolved. Its sole MP Mangala Samaraweera joins the UNP on 6 August 2010.
- 5 August 2010 – Palani Digambaran of the NUW and Praba Ganesan of the Democratic People's Front (DPF) cross over to the UPFA. It was reported that Ganesan was suspended from the DPF.
- 27 August 2010 – Sri Lanka Muslim Congress (SLMC) decides to support the government on constitutional changes, including removing the two-term limit on the presidency, whilst remaining in opposition. The SLMC's eight MPs will give the government the two-thirds majority needed in Parliament to amend the constitution.
- 8 September 2010 – 6 UNP MPs (A. R. M. Abdul Cader, Earl Gunasekara, Manusha Nanayakkara, Lakshman Senewiratne, Upeksha Swarnamali and Nimal Senarath Wijesinghe) cross over to the UPFA during the 18th amendment debate, following suspension from the UNP.
- 8 September 2010 – TNA MP Podiappuhamy Piyasena joins the UPFA.
- 11 September 2010 – V. Radhakrishnan quits the Ceylon Workers' Congress (CWC) to sit as an independent MP supporting the UPFA.
- 7 October 2010 – V. Radhakrishnan joins the Up-Country People's Front (UCPF).
- 22 November 2010 – 8 SLMC MPs join the UPFA.
- 24 December 2010 – Achala Jagodage is expelled from the National Freedom Front.
- 30 November 2011 – UNP MP Mohan Lal Grero crosses over to the ruling UPFA. He is rewarded by being appointed Monitoring MP for the Ministry of Education.
- 15 November 2012 – DNA MP Ajith Kumara becomes an independent MP. Kumara had been suspended from the JVP in 2011 for supporting a breakaway group of the JVP (subsequently called the Frontline Socialist Party).
- 8 August 2013 – Perumal Rajadurai quits the CWC to sit as an independent MP supporting UPFA.
- 18 November 2014 – 3 JHU MPs leave the UPFA.
- 20 November 2014 – UPFA MP Wasantha Senanayake joins the UNP.
- 21 November 2014 – UPFA minister Maithripala Sirisena resigns from the UPFA government to contest in the upcoming presidential election. He is joined by 5 other UPFA MPs – Duminda Dissanayake, M. K. D. S. Gunawardena, Rajitha Senaratne and Rajiva Wijesinha.
- 21 November 2014 – Perumal Rajadurai resigns from the UPFA. He joins the UNP on 25 November 2014.
- 26 November 2014 – UPFA MP Hunais Farook crosses over to the UNP.
- 30 November 2014 – UPFA MP Navin Dissanayake resigns from the UPFA.
- 8 December 2014 – UNP MP Tissa Attanayake and Democratic Party MP Jayantha Ketagoda join the UPFA. Attanayake is rewarded by being appointed Minister of Health on 11 December 2014.
- 10 December 2014 – Palani Digambaran and V. Radhakrishnan resign from the UPFA.
- 22 December 2014 – All Ceylon Muslim Congress (ACMC) (two MPs) leaves UPFA. The third ACMC MP (M. L. Alim Mohammad Hisbullah) remains in the government.
- 28 December 2014 – SLMC (eight MPs) leaves UPFA.
- 31 December 2014 – Faiszer Musthapha resigns from the UPFA.
- 1 January 2015 – Nandimithra Ekanayake resigns from the UPFA.
- 17 March 2015 – Rajiva Wijesinha leaves the national government and crosses over to the opposition.
- 18 March 2015 – Arjuna Ranatunga joins the SLFP.
- 22 March 2015 – 27 UPFA MPs, mostly from the SLFP, join the national government.
- 2 April 2015 – Deputy Minister Tissa Karalliyadde leaves the national government.
- 5 April 2015 – UPFA MP P. Dayaratna crosses over to UNP.
- 21 May 2015 – One cabinet minister and 3 state ministers leave the national government.
- 29 May 2015 – 3 UPFA MPs join the national government.
- 10 June 2015 – 4 UPFA MPs join the national government.

== Members ==
=== Deaths and resignations ===
The 14th parliament saw the following deaths and resignations:

- 7 October 2010 – Sarath Fonseka (DNA/COL) lost his seat after being sentenced to 30 months imprisonment by a court martial after being found guilty of breaching arms procurement guideline. His replacement Jayantha Ketagoda (DNA/COL) was sworn in on 8 March 2011.
- 2 December 2010 – Noordeen Mashoor (UPFA/VAN) died. His replacement Muthali Bawa Farook (UPFA/VAN) was sworn in on 5 January 2011.
- 24 September 2012 – Malini Fonseka (UPFA/NAT) resigned. She was sworn in again on 9 October 2012.
- 30 May 2013 – Jayalath Jayawardena (UNP/GAM) died. His replacement Ajith Mannapperuma (UNP/GAM) was sworn in on 4 June 2013.
- 24 July 2013 – Dayasiri Jayasekara (UNP/KUR) resigned to contest in the North Western provincial council elections. His replacement Nalin Bandara Jayamaha (UNP/KUR) was sworn in on 8 August 2013.
- 5 August 2014 – Harin Fernando (UNP/BAD) resigned to contest in the Uva provincial council elections. His replacement K. Velayudam (UNP/BAD) was sworn in on 8 August 2014.
- 28 November 2014 – A. H. M. Azwer (UPFA/NAT) resigned to allow an All Ceylon Makkal Congress member to be appointed. His replacement Ameer Ali (UPFA/NAT) was sworn in on 12 December 2014.
- 9 January 2015 – Maithripala Sirisena (UPFA/POL) resigned to take up presidency. His replacement Jayasinghe Bandara (UPFA/POL) was sworn in on 29 January 2015.
- 12 May 2015 – Neranjan Wickramasinghe (UPFA/KUR) died. His replacement R. D. Wimaladasa (UPFA/KUR) was sworn in on 20 May 2015.

=== List ===
Name	Electoral District	Preference Votes	Member From	Member To	Elected Party	Elected Alliance	Final Party	Final Alliance	Notes
Rohitha Abeygunawardena	KAL	77,205	22 April 2010	26 June 2015	SLFP	UPFA	SLFP	UPFA	Deputy Minister of Ports & Aviation (10). Deputy Minister of Ports & Highways (10-13). Project Minister of Ports & Highways (13-15).
Ashoka Abeysinghe	KUR	32,990	22 April 2010	26 June 2015	UNP	UNF	UNP	NG	
Lakshman Yapa Abeywardena	MTR	67,510	22 April 2010	26 June 2015	UNP (D)	UPFA		NG	Deputy Minister of Economic Development (10-13). Minister of Investment Promotion (13-15). Deputy Minister of Aviation Services (15-). Minister of Parliamentary Affairs (15-).
Mahinda Yapa Abeywardena	MTR	70,439	22 April 2010	26 June 2015	SLFP	UPFA	SLFP	UPFA	Minister of Agriculture (10-15). Minister of Parliamentary Affairs (15).
Selvam Adaikalanathan	VAN	17,366	22 April 2010	26 June 2015	TELO	TNA	TELO	TNA	
Lasantha Alagiyawanna	GAM	65,939	22 April 2010	26 June 2015	SLFP	UPFA	SLFP	NG	Deputy Minister of Construction, Engineering Services, Housing & Common Amenities (10-15). Deputy Minister of Rural Economic Affairs (15-).
Dullas Alahapperuma	NAT		22 April 2010	26 June 2015	SLFP	UPFA	SLFP	UPFA	Minister of Youth Affairs (10–15).
Silvestri Alantine	JAF	13,128	22 April 2010	26 June 2015	EPDP	UPFA	EPDP	UPFA	
Tiran Alles	NAT		22 April 2010	26 June 2015		DNA			
Ameer Ali	NAT		12 December 2014	26 June 2015	ACMC	UPFA	ACMC	NG	Replaces A. H. M. Azwer. Deputy Minister of Housing and Samurdhi (15-).
Hasen Ali	NAT		22 April 2010	26 June 2015	SLMC	UNF	SLMC	NG	State Minister of Health (15-).
Mahindananda Aluthgamage	KAN	146,765	22 April 2010	26 June 2015	SLFP	UPFA	SLFP	UPFA	Deputy Minister of Youth Affairs (10). Minister of Sport (10–15).
Wasantha Aluvihare	MTL	31,529	22 April 2010	26 June 2015	UNP	UNF	UNP	NG	Deputy Minister of Mahaweli Development and Environment (15-).
John Amaratunga	GAM	52,331	22 April 2010	26 June 2015	UNP	UNF	UNP	NG	Chief Opposition Whip (10-). Minister of Public Order, Disaster Management and Christian Affairs (15-).
Mahinda Amaraweera	HAM	105,414	22 April 2010	26 June 2015	SLFP	UPFA	SLFP	NG	Deputy Minister of Health (10). Minister of Disaster Management (10-15). Minister of Fisheries (15-).
Dilum Amunugama	KAN	45,909	22 April 2010	26 June 2015	SLFP	UPFA	SLFP	UPFA	
Sarath Amunugama	KAN	44,478	22 April 2010	26 June 2015	SLFP	UPFA	SLFP	NG	Deputy Minister of Finance & Planning (10). Senior Minister of International Monetary Co-operation (10-15). Deputy Minister of Finance & Planning (12-15). Minister of Higher Education and Research (15-).
Sivasakthy Ananthan	VAN	11,674	22 April 2010	26 June 2015	EPRLF	TNA	EPRLF	TNA	
P. Ariyanethiran	BAT	16,504	22 April 2010	26 June 2015		TNA	ITAK	TNA	
M. S. M. Aslam	NAT		22 April 2010	26 June 2015	SLMC	UNF	SLMC	NG	
A. H. M. Azwer	NAT		22 April 2010	28 November 2014	SLFP	UPFA	SLFP	UPFA	Resigned. Replaced by Ameer Ali.
A. L. M. Athaullah	AMP	36,943	22 April 2010	26 June 2015	NC	UPFA	NC	UPFA	Minister of Local Government and Provincial Councils (10–15).
Tissa Attanayake	NAT		22 April 2010	26 June 2015	UNP	UNF		UPFA	Minister of Health (14–15).
Thalatha Atukorale	RAT	64,592	22 April 2010	26 June 2015	UNP	UNF	UNP	NG	Minister of Foreign Employment (15-).
Rishad Bathiudeen	VAN	27,461	22 April 2010	26 June 2015	ACMC	UPFA	ACMC	NG	Minister of Industry and Commerce (10–14), (15-).
Jagath Balasuriya	KEG	47,294	22 April 2010	26 June 2015	SLFP	UPFA	SLFP	UPFA	Deputy Minister of Labour & Productivity Improvement (10). Minister of National Heritage (10-15).
Jayasinghe Bandara	POL	21,876	29 January 2015	26 June 2015		UPFA		UPFA	Replaces Maithripala Sirisena.
K. W. Shantha Bandara	KUR	86,353	22 April 2010	26 June 2015	SLFP	UPFA	SLFP	NG	Deputy Minister of Media (15-).
Nilantha Bandara	KUR	29,669	8 August 2013	26 June 2015	UNP		UNP	NG	Replaces Dayasiri Jayasekara.
Palitha Range Bandara	PUT	36,861	22 April 2010	26 June 2015	UNP	UNF	UNP	NG	
R. M. Ranjith Madduma Bandara	MON	15,105	22 April 2010	26 June 2015	UNP	UNF	UNP	NG	Minister of Internal Transport (15-).
Indika Bandaranaike	KUR	48,665	22 April 2010	26 June 2015	UNP (D)	UPFA		UPFA	Deputy Minister of Local Government & Provincial Councils (10–15).
Pandu Bandaranaike	GAM	49,613	22 April 2010	26 June 2015	SLFP	UPFA	SLFP	NG	Deputy Minister of Indigenous Medicine (10-15). State Minister of Public Administration and Democratic Governance (15-).
Tharanath Basnayake	KUR	46,079	22 April 2010	26 June 2015	SLFP	UPFA	SLFP	UPFA	
Vijitha Berugoda	MON	43,001	22 April 2010	26 June 2015	SLFP	UPFA	SLFP	UPFA	
Lal Chamika Buddhadasa	BAD	42,856	22 April 2010	26 June 2015	SLFP	UPFA	SLFP	UPFA	
A. R. M. Abdul Cader	KAN	54,937	22 April 2010	26 June 2015	UNP	UNF		UPFA	Deputy Minister of Environment (10-13). Deputy Minister of Environment & Renewable Energy (13-15).
Murugesu Chandrakumar	JAF	8,105	22 April 2010	26 June 2015	EPDP	UPFA	EPDP	UPFA	Deputy Chairman of Committees (10-).
S. M. Chandrasena	ANU	112,644	22 April 2010	26 June 2015	SLFP	UPFA	SLFP	UPFA	Deputy Minister of Irrigation & Water Resources Management (10). Minister of Agrarian Services & Wildlife (10-12). Deputy Minister of Agrarian Services & Wildlife (12-13). Deputy Minister of Economic Development (13-15). Cabinet Minister for Special Projects (13-15).
Reginald Cooray	KAL	60,196	22 April 2010	26 June 2015	SLFP	UPFA	SLFP	NG	Deputy Minister of Justice (10). Minister of Minor Export Promotion (10-15). Minister of Aviation Services (15-).
Wijaya Dahanayaka	MTR	44,463	22 April 2010	26 June 2015	SLFP	UPFA	SLFP	NG	Deputy Minister for Public Administration (10-15). Deputy Minister of Public Order and Christian Religious Affairs (15-).
Basheer Segu Dawood	BAT	11,678	22 April 2010	26 June 2015	SLMC	UNF	SLMC	NG	Deputy Minister of Co-operatives & Internal Trade (10-13). Minister of Productivity Promotion (13-14).
P. Dayaratna	AMP	32,915	22 April 2010	26 June 2015	UNP (D)	UPFA	UNP	NG	Minister of State Resources and Enterprise Development (10). Senior Minister of Food & Nutrition (10-15).
Harsha de Silva	NAT		22 April 2010	26 June 2015	UNP	UNF	UNP	NG	Deputy Minister of Policy Planning, Economics Affairs, Child, Youth and Cultural Affairs (15-).
Nimal Siripala de Silva	BAD	141,990	22 April 2010	26 June 2015	SLFP	UPFA	SLFP	UPFA	Leader of the House (10-15). Minister of Irrigation and Water Resources Management (10-15). Leader of the Opposition (15-).
Ranjith de Soysa	RAT	47,147	22 April 2010	26 June 2015	SLFP	UPFA	SLFP	UPFA	
Douglas Devananda	JAF	28,585	22 April 2010	26 June 2015	EPDP	UPFA	EPDP	UPFA	Minister of Traditional Industries and Small Enterprise Development (10–15).
Palani Digambaran	NUW	39,490	22 April 2010	26 June 2015	NUW	UNF	NUW	NG	Deputy Minister of National Languages & Social Integration (14). Minister of Plantation Infrastructure Development (15-).
Anura Kumara Dissanayake	NAT		22 April 2010	26 June 2015	JVP	DNA	JVP		
Duminda Dissanayake	ANU	101,384	22 April 2010	26 June 2015	SLFP	UPFA	SLFP	NG	Deputy Minister of Posts & Telecommunication (10). Deputy Minister of Youth Affairs & Skills Development (10-13). Minister of Education Services (13-14). Minister of Irrigation and Agriculture (15-).
Lalith Dissanayake	KEG	49,224	22 April 2010	26 June 2015	SLFP	UPFA	SLFP	NG	Deputy Minister of Technology & Research (10). Deputy Minister of Health (10-15). Deputy Minister of Irrigation (15-).
Navin Dissanayake	NUW	43,514	22 April 2010	26 June 2015	UNP (D)	UPFA	UNP	NG	Minister of Public Management Reforms (10-14). Minister of Tourism and Sports (15-).
P. Weerakumara Dissanayake	ANU	27,102	22 April 2010	26 June 2015	NFF	UPFA	NFF	UPFA	Deputy Minister of Traditional Industries & Small Enterprise Development (10-15).
Rohana Dissanayake	MTL	32,803	22 April 2010	26 June 2015	SLFP	UPFA	SLFP	UPFA	Deputy Minister of Transport (10–15).
Salinda Dissanayake	KUR	56,842	22 April 2010	26 June 2015	SLFP	UPFA	SLFP	UPFA	Deputy Minister of Plantation & Industries (10). Minister of Indigenous Medicine (10-15).
S. B. Dissanayake	KAN	108,169	22 April 2010	26 June 2015	UNP (D)	UPFA		NG	Minister of Higher Education (10-15). Minister of Rural Economic Affairs (15-).
Nandimithra Ekanayake	MTL	35,754	22 April 2010	26 June 2015	UNP (D)	UPFA		NG	Deputy Minister of Higher Education (10-14). State Minister of Culture and Arts (15-).
T. B. Ekanayake	KUR	112,420	22 April 2010	26 June 2015	SLFP	UPFA	SLFP	UPFA	Deputy Minister of Education (10). Minister of Culture and the Arts (10-15).
W. B. Ekanayake	ANU	40,634	22 April 2010	26 June 2015	UNP (D)	UPFA		UPFA	Deputy Minister of Disaster Management (10). Deputy Minister of Irrigation & Water Resources Management (10-15).
Cassim Faizal	AMP	41,852	22 April 2010	26 June 2015	SLMC	UNF	SLMC	NG	
Hunais Farook	VAN	10,851	22 April 2010	26 June 2015	ACMC	UPFA	UNP	NG	
Muthali Bawa Farook	VAN	2,456	5 January 2011	26 June 2015	SLMC	UPFA	SLMC	NG	Replaces Noordeen Mashoor.
Arundika Fernando	PUT	55,889	22 April 2010	26 June 2015	SLFP	UPFA	SLFP	UPFA	
Harin Fernando	BAD	49,073	22 April 2010	5 August 2014	UNP	UNF	UNP		Resigned. Replaced by K. Velayudam.
Johnston Fernando	KUR	136,943	22 April 2010	26 June 2015	UNP (D)	UPFA		UPFA	Minister of Co-operatives and Internal Trade (10–15).
Milroy Fernando	PUT	31,509	22 April 2010	26 June 2015	SLFP	UPFA	SLFP	UPFA	Minister of Resettlement (10). Senior Minister of Social Welfare (10-15).
Sudarshani Fernandopulle	GAM	186,140	22 April 2010	26 June 2015	SLFP	UPFA	SLFP	NG	Deputy Minister of Higher Education and Research (15-).
Malini Fonseka	NAT		22 April 2010	24 September 2012	SLFP	UPFA	SLFP	UPFA	Resigned. Replaced by Malini Fonseka.
Malini Fonseka	NAT		9 October 2012	26 June 2015	SLFP	UPFA	SLFP	UPFA	Replaces Malini Fonseka.
Sarath Fonseka	COL	98,458	22 April 2010	7 October 2010		DNA			Vacated seat. Replaced by Jayantha Ketagoda.
A. H. M. Fowzie	COL	51,641	22 April 2010	26 June 2015	SLFP	UPFA	SLFP	NG	Minister of Disaster Management (10). Senior Minister of Urban Affairs (10-15). Minister of Disaster Management (15-).
Chandrasiri Gajadeera	MTR	51,742	22 April 2010	26 June 2015	CPSL	UPFA	CPSL	UPFA	Deputy Minister of Finance & Planning (10). Minister of Rehabilitation and Prison Reforms (10-15).
Anoma Gamage	NAT		22 April 2010	26 June 2015	UNP	UNF	UNP	NG	Deputy Minister of Irrigation and Agriculture (15-).
Piyasena Gamage	GAL	67,033	22 April 2010	26 June 2015	SLFP	UPFA	SLFP	NG	Minister of Indigenous Medicine (10). Senior Minister of National Resources (10-15). Minister of Skill Development and Vocational Training (15-).
Siripala Gamalath	POL	53,973	22 April 2010	26 June 2015	SLFP	UPFA	SLFP	UPFA	Deputy Minister of Lands & Land Development (10–15).
Praba Ganesan	COL	42,851	22 April 2010	26 June 2015	DPF	UNF		UPFA	Deputy Minister of Telecommunication & Information Technology (14–15).
Dunesh Gankanda	RAT	34,219	22 April 2010	26 June 2015	UNP	UNF	UNP	NG	Deputy Minister of Urban Development, Water Supply and Drainage Board (15-).
Mohan Lal Grero	COL	68,008	22 April 2010	26 June 2015	UNP	UNF		UPFA	Deputy Minister of Education (13–15).
Sarath Kumara Gunaratna	GAM	46,040	22 April 2010	26 June 2015	SLFP	UPFA	SLFP	UPFA	Deputy Minister of State Resources & Enterprise Development (10-13). Deputy Minister of Fisheries & Aquatic Resources Development (13-15).
Earl Gunasekara	POL	26,925	22 April 2010	26 June 2015	UNP	UNF		UPFA	Deputy Minister of Plantation & Industries (10–15).
Hemal Gunasekara	MTR	51,013	22 April 2010	26 June 2015	SLFP	UPFA	SLFP	NG	Deputy Minister of Cooperative & Internal trade (13-15). State Minister of Housing and Samurdhi (15-).
D. E. W. Gunasekera	NAT		22 April 2010	26 June 2015	CPSL	UPFA	CPSL	UPFA	Minister of Rehabilitation and Prison Reforms (10). Senior Minister of Human Resources (10-15).
Bandula Gunawardena	COL	64,654	22 April 2010	26 June 2015	UNP (D)	UPFA		UPFA	Minister of Education (10–15).
Dinesh Gunawardena	COL	116,860	22 April 2010	26 June 2015	MEP	UPFA	MEP	UPFA	Chief Government Whip (10-15). Minister of Water Supply and Drainage (10-15).
Gitanjana Gunawardena	NAT		22 April 2010	26 June 2015	MEP	UPFA	MEP	UPFA	Deputy Minister of External Affairs (10). Deputy Minister of Finance & Planning (10-12). Deputy Minister of Civil Aviation (12-15).
M. K. D. S. Gunawardena	TRI	19,734	22 April 2010	26 June 2015	SLFP	UPFA	SLFP	NG	Deputy Minister of Buddhasasana & Religious Affairs (10-14). Minister of Lands (15-).
Sajin Vass Gunawardena	GAL	53,989	22 April 2010	26 June 2015	SLFP	UPFA	SLFP	UPFA	
Sarana Gunawardena	GAM	61,150	22 April 2010	26 June 2015	SLFP	UPFA	SLFP	UPFA	Deputy Minister of Petroleum Industries (10–15).
Rauff Hakeem	KAN	54,097	22 April 2010	26 June 2015	SLMC	UNF	SLMC	NG	[[Minister of Justice (Sri Lanka)|Minister of Justice]] (10-14). Minister of Urban Development, Water Supply and Drainage (15-).
M. H. A. Haleem	KAN	46,240	22 April 2010	26 June 2015	UNP	UNF	UNP	NG	Minister of Muslim Religious Affairs and Posts (15-).
Sunil Handunnetti	COL	78,126	22 April 2010	26 June 2015	JVP	DNA	JVP		
H. M. M. Harees	AMP	44,755	22 April 2010	26 June 2015	SLMC	UNF	SLMC	NG	
P. Harrison	ANU	24,675	22 April 2010	26 June 2015	UNP	UNF	UNP	NG	Minister of Social Services, Welfare and Livestock Development (15-).
Kabir Hashim	KEG	48,344	22 April 2010	26 June 2015	UNP	UNF	UNP	NG	Minister of Highways, Higher Education and Investment Promotion (15-).
Jayarathna Herath	KUR	64,645	22 April 2010	26 June 2015	SLFP	UPFA	SLFP	UPFA	Deputy Minister of Industry & Commerce (10-13). Minister of Botanical Gardens & Public Recreation (13-15).
Kanaka Herath	KEG	63,136	22 April 2010	26 June 2015	SLFP	UPFA	SLFP	UPFA	
Vijitha Herath	GAM	50,967	22 April 2010	26 June 2015	JVP	DNA	JVP		
M. L. Alim Mohammad Hisbullah	BAT	22,256	22 April 2010	26 June 2015	ACMC	UPFA		UPFA	Deputy Minister of Child Development & Women's Affairs (10-13). Deputy Minister of Economic Development (13-15).
P. K. Indika	HAM	37,626	22 April 2010	26 June 2015	SLFP	UPFA	SLFP	UPFA	
Achala Jagodage	NAT		22 April 2010	26 June 2015	NFF	UPFA		UPFA	
D. M. Jayaratne	NAT		22 April 2010	26 June 2015	SLFP	UPFA	SLFP	UPFA	Prime Minister (10-15). Minister of Buddhasasana and Religious Affairs (10-15).
Piyankara Jayaratne	PUT	56,098	22 April 2010	26 June 2015	SLFP	UPFA	SLFP	UPFA	Deputy Speaker & Chairman of Committees (10). Minister of Civil Aviation (10-15).
Dayasiri Jayasekara	KUR	132,949	22 April 2010	24 July 2013	UNP	UNF	UNP		Resigned. Replaced by Nilantha Bandara.
Premalal Jayasekara	RAT	73,175	22 April 2010	26 June 2015	SLFP	UPFA	SLFP	UPFA	Deputy Minister of Power & Energy (10–15).
Sumedha G. Jayasena	MON	45,837	22 April 2010	26 June 2015	SLFP	UPFA	SLFP	UPFA	Minister of Parliamentary Affairs (10–15).
Chandrani Bandara Jayasinghe	ANU	29,884	22 April 2010	26 June 2015	UNP	UNF	UNP	NG	Minister of Women’s Affairs (15-).
Karu Jayasuriya	GAM	60,310	22 April 2010	26 June 2015	UNP	UNF	UNP	NG	Minister of Buddha Sasana (15-). Minister of Public Administration, Provincial Councils, Local Government and Democratic Governance (15-).
Sanath Jayasuriya	MTR	74,352	22 April 2010	26 June 2015	SLFP	UPFA	SLFP	NG	Deputy Minister of Postal Services (13-15). Deputy Minister of Provincial Councils and Regional Development (15-).
Jayalath Jayawardena	GAM	58,302	22 April 2010	30 May 2013	UNP	UNF	UNP		Died. Replaced by Ajith Mannapperuma.
Sri Ranga Jeyaratnam	NUW	33,948	22 April 2010	26 June 2015	CF	UNF	CF		
Tissa Karalliyadde	ANU	55,017	22 April 2010	26 June 2015	SLFP	UPFA	SLFP	NG	Minister of Child Development & Women's Affairs (10-15). Deputy Minister of Buddha Sasana and Democratic Rule (15).
Akila Viraj Kariyawasam	KUR	66,477	22 April 2010	26 June 2015	UNP	UNF	UNP	NG	Minister of Education (15-).
Ravi Karunanayake	COL	70,328	22 April 2010	26 June 2015	UNP	UNF	UNP	NG	Minister of Finance (15-).
Gayantha Karunatileka	GAL	49,945	22 April 2010	26 June 2015	UNP	UNF	UNP	NG	Minister of Mass Media and Parliamentary Affairs (15-). Chief Government Whip (15-).
Jayantha Ketagoda	COL	22,193	8 March 2011	26 June 2015		DNA		UPFA	Replaces Sarath Fonseka.
Lakshman Kiriella	KAN	53,690	22 April 2010	26 June 2015	UNP	UNF	UNP	NG	Minister of Plantation Industries (15-). Leader of the House (15-)
Nirmala Kotalawala	KAL	82,044	22 April 2010	26 June 2015	SLFP	UPFA	SLFP	UPFA	Deputy Minister of Highways (10). Deputy Minister of Ports & Highways (10-13). Project Minister of Ports & Highways (13-15).
Ajith Kumara	GAL	15,872	22 April 2010	26 June 2015	JVP	DNA	Ind		
Jeewan Kumaranatunga	COL	51,080	22 April 2010	26 June 2015	SLFP	UPFA	SLFP	NG	Minister of Posts & Telecommunication (10). Minister of Postal Services (10-15). State Minister of Labour (15-).
Udith Lokubandara	BAD	38,124	22 April 2010	26 June 2015	SLFP	UPFA	SLFP	UPFA	
Gamini Lokuge	COL	49,750	22 April 2010	26 June 2015	UNP (D)	UPFA		UPFA	Minister of Labour & Productivity Improvement (10–15).
Vijayakala Maheswaran	JAF	7,160	22 April 2010	26 June 2015	UNP	UNF	UNP	NG	Deputy Minister of Women’s Affairs (15-).
Ajith Mannapperuma	GAM	44,812	4 June 2013	26 June 2015	UNP		UNP	NG	Replaces Jayalath Jayawardena.
Noordeen Mashoor	VAN	9,518	22 April 2010	2 December 2010	SLMC	UNF	SLMC	UPFA	Died. Replaced by Muthali Bawa Farook.
Ellawala Medhananda Thero	NAT		22 April 2010	26 June 2015	JHU	UPFA	JHU	NG	
H. R. Mithrapala	KEG	37,745	22 April 2010	26 June 2015	SLFP	UPFA	SLFP	UPFA	Deputy Minister of Livestock Development (10–15).
V. Muralitharan	NAT		22 April 2010	26 June 2015	SLFP	UPFA	SLFP	UPFA	Deputy Minister of Resettlement (10–15).
Faiszer Musthapha	KAN	44,648	22 April 2010	26 June 2015	SLFP	UPFA	SLFP	NG	Deputy Minister of Environment (10). Deputy Minister of Technology & Research (10-13). Deputy Minister of Investment Promotion (13-14). State Minister of Aviation (15).
Nishantha Muthuhettigama	GAL	125,777	22 April 2010	26 June 2015	SLFP	UPFA	SLFP	UPFA	Deputy Minister of Minor Export Crop Promotion (13–15).
Sarath Chandrasiri Muthukumarana	ANU	44,645	22 April 2010	26 June 2015	SLFP	UPFA	SLFP	UPFA	Deputy Minister of Rehabilitation & Prison Reforms (13–15).
Manusha Nanayakkara	GAL	49,690	22 April 2010	26 June 2015	UNP	UNF		UPFA	
Vasudeva Nanayakkara	RAT	56,493	22 April 2010	26 June 2015	DLF	UPFA	DLF	UPFA	Minister of National Languages and Social Integration (10–15).
S. B. Nawinne	KUR	74,976	22 April 2010	26 June 2015	SLFP	UPFA	SLFP	NG	Minister of National Languages and Social Integration (10). Senior Minister of Consumer Welfare (10-15). Minister of Labour (15-).
Vino Noharathalingam	VAN	12,120	22 April 2010	26 June 2015	TELO	TNA	TELO	TNA	
Y. G. Padmasiri	KEG	61,582	22 April 2010	26 June 2015	LSSP	UPFA	LSSP	UPFA	Deputy Minister of Agriculture (13–15).
Buddhika Pathirana	MTR	62,499	22 April 2010	26 June 2015	UNP	UNF	UNP	NG	
Ramesh Pathirana	GAL	95,313	22 April 2010	26 June 2015	SLFP	UPFA	SLFP	UPFA	
G. L. Peiris	NAT		22 April 2010	26 June 2015	UNP (D)	UPFA		UPFA	Minister of External Affairs (10–15).
Ajith Perera	KAL	48,588	22 April 2010	26 June 2015	UNP	UNF	UNP	NG	Deputy Minister of Foreign Affairs (15-).
Dilan Perera	BAD	69,610	22 April 2010	26 June 2015	SLFP	UPFA	SLFP	UPFA	Deputy Minister of Public Administration & Home Affairs (10). Minister of Foreign Employment & Welfare (10-15). State Minister of Housing and Samurdhi (15).
Felix Perera	GAM	69,938	22 April 2010	26 June 2015	SLFP	UPFA	SLFP	NG	Minister of Social Services (10-15). Minister of Special Projects (15-).
Gamini Jayawickrama Perera	KUR	44,131	22 April 2010	26 June 2015	UNP	UNF	UNP	NG	Minister of Food Security (15-).
Lakshman Wasantha Perera	MTL	65,077	22 April 2010	26 June 2015	SLFP	UPFA	SLFP	UPFA	Deputy Minister of Industry & Commerce (13–15).
M. Joseph Michael Perera	NAT		22 April 2010	26 June 2015	UNP	UNF	UNP	NG	Minister of Home Affairs and Fisheries (15-).
Neomal Perera	PUT	32,781	22 April 2010	26 June 2015	UNP (D)	UPFA		UPFA	Deputy Minister of Co-operatives & Internal Trade (10). Deputy Minister of External Affairs (10-15).
Niroshan Perera	PUT	28,077	22 April 2010	26 June 2015	UNP	UNF	UNP	NG	State Minister of Youth Affairs (15-).
Victor Anthony Perera	PUT	35,259	22 April 2010	26 June 2015	SLFP	UPFA	SLFP	UPFA	Deputy Minister of Coconut Development & Janatha Estate Development (13-15).
Podiappuhamy Piyasena	AMP	11,139	22 April 2010	26 June 2015		TNA		UPFA	
Suresh Premachandran	JAF	16,425	22 April 2010	26 June 2015	EPRLF	TNA	EPRLF	TNA	
A. D. Champika Premadasa	KEG	40,914	22 April 2010	26 June 2015	UNP	UNF	UNP	NG	Deputy Minister of Industry and Commerce (15-).
Sajith Premadasa	HAM	74,467	22 April 2010	26 June 2015	UNP	UNF	UNP	NG	Minister of Housing and Samurdhi (15-).
Susil Premajayanth	COL	54,702	22 April 2010	26 June 2015	SLFP	UPFA	SLFP	UPFA	Minister of Petroleum Industries (10-13). Minister of Environment and Renewable Energy (13-15).
Janaka Bandara Priyantha	NAT		22 April 2010	26 June 2015	SLFP	UPFA	SLFP	UPFA	
Susantha Punchinilame	TRI	22,820	22 April 2010	26 June 2015	UNP (D)	UPFA		UPFA	Deputy Minister of Fisheries & Aquatic Resources Development (10-13). Deputy Minister of Economic Development (13-15).
A. P. Jagath Pushpakumara	MON	67,903	22 April 2010	26 June 2015	SLFP	UPFA	SLFP	NG	Deputy Minister of Agriculture (10). Minister of Coconut Development and Janatha Estate Development (10-15). Deputy Minister of Plantation Industries (15-).
Rohana Pushpakumara	BAD	36,080	22 April 2010	26 June 2015	SLFP	UPFA	SLFP	UPFA	
Velusami Radhakrishnan	NUW	54,083	22 April 2010	26 June 2015	CWC	UPFA	UCPF	NG	Deputy Minister of Botanical Gardens & Public Recreation (14). State Minister of Education (15-).
Perumal Rajadurai	NUW	49,228	22 April 2010	26 June 2015	CWC	UPFA	UNP	NG	
Basil Rajapaksa	GAM	425,861	22 April 2010	26 June 2015	SLFP	UPFA	SLFP	UPFA	Minister of Economic Development (10–15).
Chamal Rajapaksa	HAM	79,648	22 April 2010	26 June 2015	SLFP	UPFA	SLFP	UPFA	Speaker (10-).
Namal Rajapaksa	HAM	147,566	22 April 2010	26 June 2015	SLFP	UPFA	SLFP	UPFA	
Nirupama Rajapaksa	HAM	39,025	22 April 2010	26 June 2015	SLFP	UPFA	SLFP	UPFA	Deputy Minister of Water Supply & Drainage (10–15).
Wijeyadasa Rajapaksa	COL	60,030	22 April 2010	26 June 2015	UNP	UNF	UNP	NG	Minister of Justice and Labour Relations (15-).
Ranjan Ramanayake	RAT	59,318	22 April 2010	26 June 2015	UNP	UNF	UNP	NG	Deputy Minister of Social Services, Welfare and Livestock Development (15-).
Keheliya Rambukwella	KAN	133,060	22 April 2010	26 June 2015	UNP (D)	UPFA		UPFA	Minister of Mass Media and Information (10–15).
Roshan Ranasinghe	POL	56,223	22 April 2010	26 June 2015	SLFP	UPFA	SLFP	UPFA	
Arjuna Ranatunga	KAL	27,796	22 April 2010	26 June 2015		DNA	SLFP	NG	Minister of Ports, Shipping and Aviation (15-).
Kamala Ranatunga	NAT		22 April 2010	26 June 2015	SLFP	UPFA	SLFP	UPFA	
Ruwan Ranatunga	GAM	66,488	22 April 2010	26 June 2015	SLFP	UPFA	SLFP	UPFA	
Champika Ranawaka	COL	120,333	22 April 2010	26 June 2015	JHU	UPFA	JHU	NG	Minister of Power and Energy (10-13), (15-). Minister of Technology, Research and Atomic Energy (13-14).
Athuraliye Rathana	GAM	112,010	22 April 2010	26 June 2015	JHU	UPFA	JHU	NG	
C. B. Rathnayake	NUW	41,345	22 April 2010	26 June 2015	SLFP	UPFA	SLFP	UPFA	Minister of Sport (10). Minister of Private Transport Services (10-15). State Minister of Public Administration and Democratic Rule (15).
Lohan Ratwatte	KAN	81,812	22 April 2010	26 June 2015	SLFP	UPFA	SLFP	UPFA	
Sunny Rohana	RAT	37,902	22 April 2010	26 June 2015	SLFP	UPFA	SLFP	UPFA	
Mahinda Samarasinghe	KAL	97,778	22 April 2010	26 June 2015	SLFP	UPFA	SLFP	NG	Minister of Plantation Industries (10-15). State Minister of Finance (15-).
Mangala Samaraweera	MTR	59,836	22 April 2010	26 June 2015	SLFP (P)	UNF	UNP	NG	Minister of Foreign Affairs (15-).
R. Sampanthan	TRI	24,488	22 April 2010	26 June 2015	ITAK	TNA	ITAK	TNA	
E. Saravanapavan	JAF	14,961	22 April 2010	26 June 2015		TNA	ITAK	TNA	
P. Selvarasa	BAT	18,485	22 April 2010	26 June 2015	ITAK	TNA	ITAK	TNA	
Asanka Shehan Semasinghe	ANU	46,115	22 April 2010	26 June 2015	SLFP	UPFA	SLFP	UPFA	
Rosy Senanayake	COL	66,357	22 April 2010	26 June 2015	UNP	UNF	UNP	NG	State Minister of Children’s Affairs (15-).
Wasantha Senanayake	GAM	51,124	22 April 2010	26 June 2015	SLFP	UPFA	UNP	NG	Deputy Minister of Tourism and Sports (15-).
Rajitha Senaratne	KAL	66,710	22 April 2010	26 June 2015	UNP (D)	UPFA	SLFP	NG	Minister of Fisheries and Aquatic Resources Development (10-14). Minister of Health and Indigenous Medicine (15-).
Sujeewa Senasinghe	COL	52,559	22 April 2010	26 June 2015	UNP	UNF	UNP	NG	Deputy Minister of Justice and Labour Relations (15-).
Mavai Senathirajah	JAF	20,501	22 April 2010	26 June 2015	ITAK	TNA	ITAK	TNA	
Athauda Senewiratne	KEG	67,719	22 April 2010	26 June 2015	SLFP	UPFA	SLFP	UPFA	Minister of Justice (10). Senior Minister of Rural Affairs (10-15).
John Senewiratne	RAT	125,816	22 April 2010	26 June 2015	SLFP	UPFA	SLFP	UPFA	Minister of Public Administration and Home Affairs (10-15). Chief Opposition Whip (15-).
Lakshman Senewiratne	BAD	31,560	22 April 2010	26 June 2015	UNP	UNF		NG	Minister of Productivity Information (10-15). Minister of Sugar Industry Development (13-15). Deputy Minister of Disaster Management (15-).
Duminda Silva	COL	146,336	22 April 2010	26 June 2015	SLFP	UPFA	SLFP	UPFA	
Mervyn Silva	GAM	151,085	22 April 2010	26 June 2015	SLFP	UPFA	SLFP	UPFA	Deputy Minister of Mass Media & Information (10); DM for Highways (10), (10). Minister of Public Relations and Public Affairs (10-15).
Mohan Silva	GAL	49,456	22 April 2010	26 June 2015	SLFP	UPFA	SLFP	UPFA	
Maithripala Sirisena	POL	90,118	22 April 2010	9 January 2015	SLFP	UPFA	SLFP		Minister of Health (10–14). Elected President. Replaced by Jayasinghe Bandara .
Muthu Sivalingam	NAT		22 April 2010	26 June 2015	CWC	UPFA	CWC	UPFA	Deputy Minister of Economic Development (10–15).
Ranjith Siyambalapitiya	KEG	141,935	22 April 2010	26 June 2015	SLFP	UPFA	SLFP	NG	Deputy Minister of Economic Development (10). Minister of Telecommunications and Information Technology (10-15). Deputy Minister of Home Affairs (15-). State Minister of Environment (15-).
Gamini Vijith Vijithamuni Soysa	MON	54,516	22 April 2010	26 June 2015	SLFP	UPFA	SLFP	NG	Deputy Minister of Rehabilitation & Prison Reforms (10). Deputy Minister of Education (10-13). Minister of Wildlife Resources Conservation (13-15). Minister of Irrigation (15-).
S. Sritharan	JAF	10,057	22 April 2010	26 June 2015		TNA	ITAK	TNA	
M. A. Sumanthiran	NAT		22 April 2010	26 June 2015		TNA	ITAK	TNA	
Thilanga Sumathipala	COL	60,848	22 April 2010	26 June 2015	SLFP	UPFA	SLFP	NG	Deputy Minister of Skills Development and Vocational Training
C. A. Suriyaarachchi	POL	44,356	22 April 2010	26 June 2015	UNP (D)	UPFA		NG	Deputy Minister of Social Services (10-15). Deputy Minister of Lands (15-).
J. R. P. Suriyapperuma	NAT		22 April 2010	26 June 2015	SLFP	UPFA	SLFP	UPFA	
D. M. Swaminathan	NAT		22 April 2010	26 June 2015	UNP	UNF	UNP	NG	Minister of Resettlement, Reconstruction and Hindu Religious Affairs (15-).
Upeksha Swarnamali	GAM	81,350	22 April 2010	26 June 2015	UNP	UNF		UPFA	
Janaka Bandara Tennakoon	MTL	47,133	22 April 2010	26 June 2015	SLFP	UPFA	SLFP	NG	Minister of Lands and Land Development (10-15). Minister of Provincial Councils and Local Development (15-).
M. S. Thowfeek	TRI	23,588	22 April 2010	26 June 2015	SLMC	UNF	SLMC	NG	Deputy Minister of Internal Transport (15-).
Palitha Thewarapperuma	KAL	51,153	22 April 2010	26 June 2015	UNP	UNF	UNP	NG	
Dayasritha Thissera	PUT	38,704	22 April 2010	26 June 2015	SLFP	UPFA	SLFP	NG	Deputy Minister of Ports & Aviation (10). Minister of State Resources and Enterprise Development (10-15). Deputy Minister of Fisheries (15-).
Arumugan Thondaman	NUW	60,997	22 April 2010	26 June 2015	CWC	UPFA	CWC	UPFA	Minister of Livestock Development (10–15).
K. Velayudam	BAD	25,056	8 August 2014	26 June 2015	UNP		UNP	NG	Replaces Harin Fernando. State Minister of Plantation Industries (15-).
Amith Thenuka Vidanagamage	BAD	34,742	22 April 2010	26 June 2015	SLFP	UPFA	SLFP	UPFA	
A. Vinayagamoorthy	JAF	15,311	22 April 2010	26 June 2015		TNA		TNA	
Tissa Vitharana	NAT		22 April 2010	26 June 2015	LSSP	UPFA	LSSP	UPFA	Minister of Technology and Research (10). Senior Minister of Scientific Affairs (10-15).
Janaka Wakkumbura	RAT	70,473	22 April 2010	26 June 2015	SLFP	UPFA	SLFP	UPFA	
Pavithra Devi Wanniarachchi	RAT	110,220	22 April 2010	26 June 2015	SLFP	UPFA	SLFP	UPFA	Minister of National Heritage & Cultural Affairs (10). Minister of Technology and Research (10-13). Minister of Power and Energy (13-15). State Minister of Environment (15).
Dilip Wedaarachchi	HAM	47,160	22 April 2010	26 June 2015	UNP	UNF	UNP	NG	State Minister of Fisheries (15-).
Chandima Weerakkody	GAL	67,231	22 April 2010	26 June 2015	SLFP	UPFA	SLFP	UPFA	Deputy Speaker & Chairman of Committees (10-).
Gunaratna Weerakoon	GAL	68,629	22 April 2010	26 June 2015	SLFP	UPFA	SLFP	UPFA	Deputy Minister of National Heritage & Cultural Affairs (10). Minister of Resettlement (10-15).
Sarath Weerasekara	AMP	54,373	22 April 2010	26 June 2015	SLFP	UPFA	SLFP	UPFA	Deputy Minister of Labour & Labour Relations (13–15).
Wimal Weerawansa	COL	280,672	22 April 2010	26 June 2015	NFF	UPFA	NFF	UPFA	Minister of Construction, Engineering Services, Housing and Common Amenities (10-15).
Erik Weerawardena	KAN	54,195	22 April 2010	26 June 2015	SLFP	UPFA	SLFP	NG	Deputy Minister of Ports and Shipping
Kumara Welgama	KAL	124,766	22 April 2010	26 June 2015	SLFP	UPFA	SLFP	UPFA	Minister of Transport (10–15).
Ratnasiri Wickremanayake	NAT		22 April 2010	26 June 2015	SLFP	UPFA	SLFP	UPFA	Minister of Public Management Reforms (10). Senior Minister of Good Governance & Infrastructure (10-15).
Eran Wickremaratne	NAT		22 April 2010	26 June 2015	UNP	UNF	UNP	NG	Deputy Minister of Highways, Higher Education and Investment Promotion (15-).
Neranjan Wickremasinghe	KUR	54,572	22 April 2010	12 May 2015	SLFP	UPFA	SLFP	NG	Deputy Minister of Public Order and Christian Religious Affairs (15). Died. Replaced by R. D. Wimaladasa.
Ranil Wickremasinghe	COL	232,957	22 April 2010	26 June 2015	UNP	UNF	UNP	NG	Leader of the Opposition (10-15). Prime Minister (15-). Minister of Policy Planning, Economics Affairs, Child, Youth and Cultural Affairs (15-).
Vidura Wickremenayake	KAL	50,114	22 April 2010	26 June 2015	SLFP	UPFA	SLFP	UPFA	
Duleep Wijesekera	GAM	51,469	22 April 2010	26 June 2015	SLFP	UPFA	SLFP	UPFA	Deputy Minister of Disaster Management (10–15).
Nimal Wijesinghe	KUR	30,687	22 April 2010	26 June 2015	UNP	UNF		UPFA	
Rajiva Wijesinha	NAT		22 April 2010	26 June 2015	LP	UPFA	LP		State Minister of Higher Education (15).
Ruwan Wijewardene	GAM	88,850	22 April 2010	26 June 2015	UNP	UNF	UNP	NG	State Minister of Defence (15-).
Shriyani Wijewickreme	AMP	33,810	22 April 2010	26 June 2015	MEP	UPFA	MEP	UPFA	
R. D. Wimaladasa	KUR	44,728	20 May 2015	26 June 2015	SLFP	UPFA	SLFP	UPFA	Replaces Neranjan Wickremasinghe.
Anura Priyadharshana Yapa	KUR	98,880	22 April 2010	26 June 2015	SLFP	UPFA	SLFP	UPFA	Minister of Environment (10-13). Minister of Petroleum Industries (13-15).
R. Yogarajan	NAT		22 April 2010	26 June 2015	UNP	UNF	UNP	NG	
S. Yogeswaran	BAT	20,569	22 April 2010	26 June 2015		TNA	ITAK	TNA	

== Sources ==
- "PART I : SECTION (I) — GENERAL Government Notifications THE PARLIAMENTARY ELECTIONS ACT, No. 1 OF 1981" (PDF). The Gazette of the Democratic Socialist Republic of Sri Lanka Extraordinary. 1649/2. 12 April 2010. Archived from the original (PDF) on 2010-05-25.
- "PART I : SECTION (I) — GENERAL Government Notifications THE PARLIAMENTARY ELECTIONS ACT, No. 1 OF 1981" (PDF). The Gazette of the Democratic Socialist Republic of Sri Lanka Extraordinary. 1650/15. 21 April 2010. Archived from the original (PDF) on 2010-05-25.
- "PART I : SECTION (I) — GENERAL Government Notifications THE PARLIAMENTARY ELECTIONS ACT, No. 1 OF 1981" (PDF). The Gazette of the Democratic Socialist Republic of Sri Lanka Extraordinary. 1650/19. 21 April 2010. Archived from the original (PDF) on 14 December 2014.
- "General Elections 2010 - Preferential Votes" (PDF). The Sunday Times (Sri Lanka). 11 April 2010.
- "The 29 national list members for the Seventh Parliament". The Daily Mirror (Sri Lanka). 22 April 2010. Archived from the original on 21 September 2019.
- "PART I : SECTION (I) — GENERAL Appointments & c., by the President". The Gazette of the Democratic Socialist Republic of Sri Lanka Extraordinary. 1651/3. 26 April 2010.
- "PRESIDENT APPOINTS A 38-MEMBER CABINET". The Daily Mirror (Sri Lanka). 24 April 2010. Archived from the original on 20 August 2020.
- "New Ministers and Deputies". The Daily Mirror (Sri Lanka). 24 April 2010. Archived from the original on 20 August 2020.
- "PART I : SECTION (I) — GENERAL Appointments & c., by the President" (PDF). The Gazette of the Democratic Socialist Republic of Sri Lanka Extraordinary. 1681/2. 22 November 2010. Archived from the original (PDF) on 22 February 2014.
- "60 ministers, 31 deputy ministers sworn in yesterday". The Daily Mirror (Sri Lanka). 23 November 2010. Archived from the original on 25 November 2010.
- "NEW FACES BOOST CABINET AS HOPES RISE". The Nation (Sri Lanka). 28 November 2010. Archived from the original on 2016-03-04.
- "PART I : SECTION (I) — GENERAL Government Notifications" (PDF). The Gazette of the Democratic Socialist Republic of Sri Lanka Extraordinary. 1778/29. 4 October 2012. Archived from the original (PDF) on 2012-12-01.
- "PART I : SECTION (I) — GENERAL Appointments & c., by the President" (PDF). The Gazette of the Democratic Socialist Republic of Sri Lanka Extraordinary. 1779/6. 8 October 2012. Archived from the original (PDF) on 2012-12-02.
- "PART I : SECTION (I) — GENERAL Government Notifications" (PDF). The Gazette of the Democratic Socialist Republic of Sri Lanka Extraordinary. 1783/7. 5 November 2012.
- "PART I : SECTION (I) — GENERAL Appointments & c., by the President" (PDF). The Gazette of the Democratic Socialist Republic of Sri Lanka Extraordinary. 1783/8. 5 November 2012.
- "PART I : SECTION (I) — GENERAL Appointments & c., by the President" (PDF). The Gazette of the Democratic Socialist Republic of Sri Lanka Extraordinary. 1795/43. 31 January 2013. Archived from the original (PDF) on 2013-05-31.
- "PART I : SECTION (I) — GENERAL Appointments & c., by the President" (PDF). The Gazette of the Democratic Socialist Republic of Sri Lanka Extraordinary. 1832/16. 14 October 2013. Archived from the original (PDF) on 2013-10-20.
- "PART I : SECTION (I) — GENERAL Government Notifications PROCLAMATION" (PDF). The Gazette of the Democratic Socialist Republic of Sri Lanka Extraordinary. 1896/29. 10 January 2015. Archived from the original (PDF) on 28 January 2015.
- "PART I : SECTION (I) — GENERAL Appointments & c., by the President" (PDF). The Gazette of the Democratic Socialist Republic of Sri Lanka Extraordinary. 1897/16. 18 January 2015. Archived from the original (PDF) on 28 January 2015.
- "PART I : SECTION (I) — GENERAL Appointments & c., by the President" (PDF). The Gazette of the Democratic Socialist Republic of Sri Lanka Extraordinary. 1898/70. 23 January 2015. Archived from the original (PDF) on 2015-01-28.
