= Mahinda Rajapaksa cabinets =

Sri Lanka government (2005–2015)

Rajapaksa cabinet
- 14th Cabinet of Sri Lanka

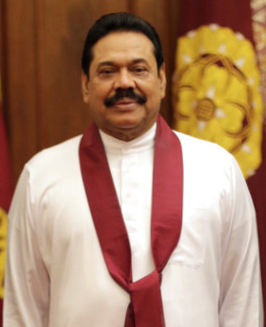
- Date formed: 19 November 2005
- Date dissolved: 9 January 2015

People and organisations
- Head of state: Mahinda Rajapaksa
- Head of government: Mahinda Rajapaksa
- Deputy head of government: Ratnasiri Wickremanayake (2005–10); D. M. Jayaratne (2010–15)
- No. of ministers: 27 (2005-2007); 38 (2007-2010); 107 (2010-2015)
- Total no. of members: 84 (2005-2010); 170 (2010-2013); 111 (2013-2015)
- Member party: United People's Freedom Alliance
- Status in legislature: Minority government (2005–10); Majority government (2010–13); Majority coalition (2013–15)
- Opposition party: United National Party
- Opposition leader: Ranil Wickremesinghe

History
- Elections: 2005, 2010 presidential, 2010 parliamentary
- Outgoing election: 2015
- Legislature terms: 13th, 14th
- Predecessor: Kumaratunga
- Successor: Sirisena I

The Rajapaksa cabinet was the central government of Sri Lanka led by President Mahinda Rajapaksa between 2005 and 2015. It was formed in November 2005 after the presidential election and it ended in January 2015 after the opposition's victory in the presidential election. The cabinet was known as the Jambo Cabinet and holds the world record for the largest cabinet in the world.

== Cabinet members ==
| Party | Minister | Office | Took office | Left office |
|---|---|---|---|---|
| SLFP | Mahinda Rajapaksa | President | 19 November 2005 | 9 January 2015 |
| SLFP | Mahinda Rajapaksa | Minister of Defence and Urban Development | 19 November 2005 | 9 January 2015 |
| SLFP | Mahinda Rajapaksa | Minister of Finance and Planning | 19 November 2005 | 9 January 2015 |
| SLFP | Mahinda Rajapaksa | Minister of Law and Order | 26 August 2013 | 9 January 2015 |
| SLFP | Mahinda Rajapaksa | Minister of Highways, Ports and Shipping | 23 April 2010 | 9 January 2015 |
| UNP (D) | Lakshman Yapa Abeywardena | Minister of Investment Promotion | 28 January 2013 | 12 January 2015 |
| SLFP | Mahinda Yapa Abeywardena | Minister of Cultural Affairs | 28 January 2007 | 23 April 2010 |
| SLFP | Mahinda Yapa Abeywardena | Minister of Agriculture | 23 April 2010 | 12 January 2015 |
| SLFP | Dullas Alahapperuma | Minister of Transport | 28 January 2007 | 23 April 2010 |
| SLFP | Dullas Alahapperuma | Minister of Youth Affairs and Skills Development | 23 April 2010 | 12 January 2015 |
| SLFP | Mahindananda Aluthgamage | Minister of Sport | 22 November 2010 | 12 January 2015 |
| SLFP | Mahinda Amaraweera | Minister of Disaster Management | 22 November 2010 | 12 January 2015 |
| SLFP | Sarath Amunugama | Minister of Public Administration and Home Affairs | 23 November 2005 | 28 January 2007 |
| SLFP | Sarath Amunugama | Minister of Enterprise Development and Investment Promotion | 28 January 2007 | 23 April 2010 |
| SLFP | Sarath Amunugama | Senior Minister of International Monetary Co-operation | 22 November 2010 | 12 January 2015 |
| NUA | Ferial Ashraff | Minister of Housing and Construction | 23 November 2005 | 28 January 2007 |
| NUA | Ferial Ashraff | Minister of Housing and Common Amenities | 28 January 2007 | 23 April 2010 |
| NC | A. L. M. Athaullah | Minister of Infrastructure Development and Fisheries Housing | 23 November 2005 | 28 January 2007 |
| NC | A. L. M. Athaullah | Minister of Water Supply and Drainage | 28 January 2007 | 23 April 2010 |
| NC | A. L. M. Athaullah | Minister of Local Government and Provincial Councils | 23 April 2010 | 12 January 2015 |
| SLFP | Tissa Attanayake | Minister of Health | 11 December 2014 | 12 January 2015 |
| ACMC | Rishad Bathiudeen | Minister of Resettlement and Disaster Relief Services | 28 January 2007 | 23 April 2010 |
| ACMC | Rishad Bathiudeen | Minister of Industry and Commerce | 23 April 2010 | 22 December 2014 |
| SLFP | Jagath Balasuriya | Minister of National Heritage | 22 November 2010 | 12 January 2015 |
| UNP (D) | R. M. Dharmadasa Banda | Minister of Supplementary Plantation Crops Development | 28 January 2007 | |
| SLFP | Anura Bandaranaike | Minister of Tourism | 23 November 2005 | 28 January 2007 |
| SLFP | Anura Bandaranaike | Minister of National Heritage | 28 January 2007 | 14 December 2007 |
| SLFP | Rohitha Bogollagama | Minister of Enterprise Development and Investment Promotion | 23 November 2005 | 28 January 2007 |
| SLFP | Rohitha Bogollagama | Minister of Foreign Affairs | 28 January 2007 | 8 April 2010 |
| UCPF | P. Chandrasekaran | Minister of Community Development and Social Inequity Eradication | 28 January 2007 | 1 January 2010 |
| SLFP | S. M. Chandrasena | Minister of Agrarian Services and Wildlife | 23 April 2010 | 2012 |
| SLFP | S. M. Chandrasena | Cabinet Minister for Special Projects | 23 November 2013 | 12 January 2015 |
| SLFP | Reginald Cooray | Minister of Minor Export Crop Promotion | 22 November 2010 | 12 January 2015 |
| SLMC | Basheer Segu Dawood | Minister of Productivity Promotion | 28 January 2013 | 28 December 2014 |
| UNP (D) | P. Dayaratna | Minister of Plan Implementation | 28 January 2007 | 23 April 2010 |
| UNP (D) | P. Dayaratna | Minister of State Resources and Enterprise Development | 23 April 2010 | 22 November 2010 |
| UNP (D) | P. Dayaratna | Senior Minister of Food and Nutrition | 22 November 2010 | 12 January 2015 |
| SLFP | Nimal Siripala de Silva | Minister of Healthcare and Nutrition | 23 November 2005 | 23 April 2010 |
| SLFP | Nimal Siripala de Silva | Minister of Irrigation and Water Resources Management | 23 April 2010 | 12 January 2015 |
| EPDP | Douglas Devananda | Minister of Social Services and Social Welfare | 23 November 2005 | 23 April 2010 |
| EPDP | Douglas Devananda | Minister of Traditional Industries and Small Enterprise Development | 23 April 2010 | 12 January 2015 |
| SLFP | Duminda Dissanayake | Minister of Educational Services | 28 January 2013 | 21 November 2014 |
| UNP (D) | Navin Dissanayake | Minister of Public Management Reforms | 22 November 2010 | 1 December 2014 |
| SLFP | Salinda Dissanayake | Minister of Indigenous Medicine | 22 November 2010 | 12 January 2015 |
| SLFP | S. B. Dissanayake | Minister of Higher Education | 23 April 2010 | 12 January 2015 |
| SLFP | Amarasiri Dodangoda | Minister of Justice and Law Reforms | 23 November 2005 | 30 May 2009 |
| SLFP | T. B. Ekanayake | Minister of Culture and the Arts | 22 November 2010 | 12 January 2015 |
| UNP (D) | Johnston Fernando | Minister of Co-operatives and Internal Trade | 23 April 2010 | 12 January 2015 |
| SLFP | Milroy Fernando | Minister of Resettlement | 23 April 2010 | 22 November 2010 |
| SLFP | Milroy Fernando | Minister of Public Estate Management and Development | 28 January 2007 | 23 April 2010 |
| SLFP | Milroy Fernando | Senior Minister of Social Welfare | 22 November 2010 | 12 January 2015 |
| SLFP | Jeyaraj Fernandopulle | Minister of Trade, Commerce, Consumer Affairs and Marketing Development | 23 November 2005 | 28 January 2007 |
| SLFP | Jeyaraj Fernandopulle | Minister of Highways | 23 November 2005 | 28 January 2007 |
| SLFP | Jeyaraj Fernandopulle | Minister of Highways and Road Development | 28 January 2007 | 6 April 2008 |
| SLFP | A. H. M. Fowzie | Minister of Railways and Transport | 23 November 2005 | |
| SLFP | A. H. M. Fowzie | Minister of Petroleum and Petroleum Resources Development | 23 November 2005 | 23 April 2010 |
| SLFP | A. H. M. Fowzie | Minister of Disaster Management | 23 April 2010 | 22 November 2010 |
| SLFP | A. H. M. Fowzie | Senior Minister of Urban Affairs | 22 November 2010 | 12 January 2015 |
| CPSL | Chandrasiri Gajadeera | Minister of Rehabilitation and Prison Reforms | 22 November 2010 | 12 January 2015 |
| SLFP | Piyasena Gamage | Minister of Vocational and Technical Training | 23 November 2005 | 23 April 2010 |
| SLFP | Piyasena Gamage | Minister of Indigenous Medicine | 23 April 2010 | 22 November 2010 |
| SLFP | Piyasena Gamage | Senior Minister of National Resources | 22 November 2010 | 12 January 2015 |
| CPSL | D. E. W. Gunasekera | Minister of Constitutional Affairs and National Integration | 23 November 2005 | 23 April 2010 |
| CPSL | D. E. W. Gunasekera | Minister of Rehabilitation and Prison Reforms | 23 April 2010 | 22 November 2010 |
| CPSL | D. E. W. Gunasekera | Senior Minister of Human Resources | 22 November 2010 | 12 January 2015 |
| UNP (D) | Bandula Gunawardane | Minister of Trade, Marketing Development Co-operatives and Consumer Services | 28 January 2007 | 23 April 2010 |
| UNP (D) | Bandula Gunawardane | Minister of Education | 23 April 2010 | 12 January 2015 |
| PUF | Dinesh Gunawardena | Minister of Urban Development and Water Supply | 23 November 2005 | 28 January 2007 |
| PUF | Dinesh Gunawardena | Minister of Urban Development and Sacred Area Development | 28 January 2007 | 23 April 2010 |
| PUF | Dinesh Gunawardena | Minister of Water Supply and Drainage | 23 April 2010 | 12 January 2015 |
| SLMC | Rauff Hakeem | Minister of Justice | 22 November 2010 | 28 December 2014 |
| SLFP | Jayarathna Herath | Minister of Botanical Gardens and Public Recreation | 28 January 2013 | 12 January 2015 |
| SLFP | D. M. Jayaratne | Minister of Posts and Telecommunication | 23 November 2005 | 28 January 2007 |
| SLFP | D. M. Jayaratne | Minister of Rural Economic Development | 23 November 2005 | 28 January 2007 |
| SLFP | D. M. Jayaratne | Minister of Plantation Industries | 28 January 2007 | 28 January 2007 |
| SLFP | D. M. Jayaratne | Prime Minister | 21 April 2010 | 9 January 2015 |
| SLFP | D. M. Jayaratne | Minister of Buddhasasana and Religious Affairs | 23 April 2010 | 12 January 2015 |
| SLFP | Piyankara Jayaratne | Minister of Civil Aviation | 22 November 2010 | 12 January 2015 |
| SLFP | Sumedha G. Jayasena | Minister of Child Development and Women's Empowerment | 23 November 2005 | 23 April 2010 |
| SLFP | Sumedha G. Jayasena | Minister of Parliamentary Affairs | 23 April 2010 | 12 January 2015 |
| UNP (D) | Karu Jayasuriya | Minister of Public Administration and Home Affairs | 28 January 2007 | 9 December 208 |
| SLFP | Tissa Karalliyadde | Minister of Indigenous Medicine | 28 January 2007 | 23 April 2010 |
| SLFP | Tissa Karalliyadde | Minister of Child Development and Women's Affairs | 23 April 2010 | 12 January 2015 |
| SLFP | Jeewan Kumaranatunga | Minister of Land and Land Development | 28 January 2007 | 23 April 2010 |
| SLFP | Jeewan Kumaranatunga | Minister of Posts and Telecommunication | 23 April 2010 | 22 November 2010 |
| SLFP | Jeewan Kumaranatunga | Minister of Postal Services | 22 November 2010 | 12 January 2015 |
| UNP (D) | Gamini Lokuge | Minister of Sports and Public Recreation | 28 January 2007 | 23 April 2010 |
| UNP (D) | Gamini Lokuge | Minister of Labour and Labour Relations | 23 April 2010 | 12 January 2015 |
| UNP (D) | M. H. Mohamed | Minister of Parliamentary Affairs | 28 January 2007 | 23 April 2010 |
| SLFP | Milinda Moragoda | Minister of Tourism | 28 January 2007 | 30 May 2009 |
| SLFP | Milinda Moragoda | Minister of Justice and Law Reform | 30 May 2009 | 8 April 2010 |
| DLF | Vasudeva Nanayakkara | Minister of National Languages and Social Integration | 22 November 2010 | 12 January 2015 |
| SLFP | S. B. Nawinne | Minister of Rural Industries and Self-employment Promotion | 23 November 2005 | 23 April 2010 |
| SLFP | S. B. Nawinne | Minister of National Languages and Social Integration | 23 April 2010 | 22 November 2010 |
| SLFP | S. B. Nawinne | Senior Minister of Consumer Welfare | 22 November 2010 | 12 January 2015 |
| SLFP | G. L. Peiris | Minister of Export Development and International Trade | 28 January 2007 | 23 April 2010 |
| SLFP | G. L. Peiris | Minister of External Affairs | 23 April 2010 | 12 January 2015 |
| SLFP | Dilan Perera | Minister of Foreign Employment Promotion and Welfare | 22 November 2010 | 9 January 2015 |
| SLFP | Felix Perera | Minister of Fisheries and Aquatic Resources | 28 January 2007 | 23 April 2010 |
| SLFP | Felix Perera | Minister of Social Services | 23 April 2010 | 12 January 2015 |
| SLFP | Susil Premajayantha | Minister of Education | 23 November 2005 | 23 April 2010 |
| SLFP | Susil Premajayantha | Minister of Petroleum Industries | 23 April 2010 | 2013 |
| SLFP | Susil Premajayantha | Minister of Environment and Renewable Energy | 28 January 2013 | 12 January 2015 |
| SLFP | A. P. Jagath Pushpakumara | Minister of Coconut Development and Janatha Estate Development | 22 November 2010 | 12 January 2015 |
| SLFP | Basil Rajapaksa | Minister of Economic Development | 23 April 2010 | 12 January 2015 |
| SLFP | Chamal Rajapaksa | Minister of Irrigation and Water Management | 28 January 2007 | 23 April 2010 |
| UNP (D) | Keheliya Rambukwella | Minister of Foreign Employment Promotion and Welfare | 28 January 2007 | 23 April 2010 |
| UNP (D) | Keheliya Rambukwella | Minister of Mass Media and Information | 23 April 2010 | 12 January 2015 |
| NHP | Champika Ranawaka | Minister of Power and Energy | 2010 | 2013 |
| NHP | Champika Ranawaka | Minister of Technology, Research and Atomic Energy | 28 January 2013 | |
| SLFP | C. B. Rathnayake | Minister of Livestock Development | 28 January 2007 | |
| SLFP | C. B. Rathnayake | Minister of Sport | 23 April 2010 | 22 November 2010 |
| SLFP | C. B. Rathnayake | Minister of Private Transport Services | 22 November 2010 | 12 January 2015 |
| SLFP | Mahinda Samarasinghe | Minister of Disaster Management and Human Rights | 28 January 2007 | |
| SLFP | Mahinda Samarasinghe | Minister of Plantation Industries | 23 April 2010 | 12 January 2015 |
| SLFP | Mangala Samaraweera | Minister of Foreign Affairs | 23 November 2005 | |
| SLFP | Mangala Samaraweera | Minister of Ports and Aviation | 23 November 2005 | 28 January 2007 |
| UNP (D) | Rajitha Senaratne | Minister of Construction and Engineering Services | 28 January 2007 | 23 April 2010 |
| UNP (D) | Rajitha Senaratne | Minister of Fisheries and Aquatic Resources Development | 23 April 2010 | 2014 |
| SLFP | Athauda Seneviratne | Minister of Labour Relations and Foreign Employment | 23 November 2005 | 28 January 2007 |
| SLFP | Athauda Seneviratne | Minister of Labour Relations and Manpower | 28 January 2007 | 23 April 2010 |
| SLFP | Athauda Seneviratne | Minister of Justice | 23 April 2010 | 22 November 2010 |
| SLFP | Athauda Seneviratne | Senior Minister of Rural Affairs | 22 November 2010 | 12 January 2015 |
| SLFP | John Seneviratne | Minister of Power and Energy | 23 November 2005 | 23 April 2010 |
| SLFP | John Seneviratne | Minister of Public Administration and Home Affairs | 23 April 2010 | 12 January 2015 |
| UNP (D) | Lakshman Senewiratne | Minister of Productivity Information | 2010 | 2013 |
| UNP (D) | Lakshman Senewiratne | Minister of Sugar Industry Development | 28 January 2013 | 12 January 2015 |
| SLFP | Mervyn Silva | Minister of Public Relations and Public Affairs | 22 November 2010 | 12 January 2015 |
| SLFP | Maithripala Sirisena | Minister of Agriculture, Environment, Irrigation and Mahaweli Development | 23 November 2005 | 28 January 2007 |
| SLFP | Maithripala Sirisena | Minister of Agricultural Development and Agrarian Services | 28 January 2007 | 23 April 2010 |
| SLFP | Maithripala Sirisena | Minister of Health | 23 April 2010 | 21 November 2014 |
| SLFP | Ranjith Siyambalapitiya | Minister of Telecommunications and Information Technology | 22 November 2010 | 12 January 2015 |
| SLFP | Gamini Vijith Vijithamuni Soysa | Minister of Wildlife Conservation | 28 January 2013 | 12 January 2015 |
| SLFP | Janaka Bandara Tennakoon | Minister of Local Government and Provincial Councils | 23 November 2005 | 23 April 2010 |
| SLFP | Janaka Bandara Tennakoon | Minister of Land and Land Development | 23 April 2010 | 12 January 2015 |
| SLFP | Dayasritha Thissera | Minister of State Resources and Enterprise Development | 22 November 2010 | 12 January 2015 |
| CWC | Arumugam Thondaman | Minister of Youth Empowerment and Socio Economic Development | 28 January 2007 | 23 April 2010 |
| CWC | Arumugam Thondaman | Minister of Livestock and Rural Community Development | 23 April 2010 | 12 January 2015 |
| LSSP | Tissa Vitharana | Minister of Science and Technology | 23 November 2005 | 2010 |
| LSSP | Tissa Vitharana | Minister of Technology and Research | 23 April 2010 | 22 November 2010 |
| LSSP | Tissa Vitharana | Senior Minister of Scientific Affairs | 22 November 2010 | 12 January 2015 |
| SLFP | Pavithra Devi Wanniarachchi | Minister of Youth Affairs | 28 January 2007 | 23 April 2010 |
| SLFP | Pavithra Devi Wanniarachchi | Minister of National Heritage and Cultural Affairs | 23 April 2010 | 22 November 2010 |
| SLFP | Pavithra Devi Wanniarachchi | Minister of Technology and Research | 22 November 2010 | 28 January 2013 |
| SLFP | Pavithra Devi Wanniarachchi | Minister of Power and Energy | 28 January 2013 | 12 January 2015 |
| SLFP | W. A. Wiswa Warnapala | Minister of Higher Education | 28 January 2007 | 22 November 2010 |
| SLFP | Gunaratna Weerakoon | Minister of Resettlement | 22 November 2010 | 12 January 2015 |
| NFF | Wimal Weerawansa | Minister of Construction, Engineering Services, Housing and Common Amenities | 23 April 2010 | 12 January 2015 |
| SLFP | Kumara Welgama | Minister of Industrial Development | 28 January 2007 | 23 April 2010 |
| SLFP | Kumara Welgama | Minister of Transport | 23 April 2010 | 12 January 2015 |
| SLFP | Ratnasiri Wickremanayake | Prime Minister | 19 November 2005 | 21 April 2010 |
| SLFP | Ratnasiri Wickremanayake | Minister of Disaster Management | 23 November 2005 | 28 January 2007 |
| SLFP | Ratnasiri Wickremanayake | Minister of Internal Administration | 28 January 2007 | 23 April 2010 |
| SLFP | Ratnasiri Wickremanayake | Minister of Public Management Reform | 23 April 2010 | 22 November 2010 |
| SLFP | Ratnasiri Wickremanayake | Senior Minister of Good Governance and Infrastructure | 22 November 2010 | 12 January 2015 |
| SLFP | Mahinda Wijesekara | Minister of Special Projects | 28 January 2007 | 23 April 2010 |
| SLFP | Anura Priyadharshana Yapa | Minister of Mass Media and Information | 22 November 2005 | 23 April 2010 |
| SLFP | Anura Priyadharshana Yapa | Minister of Environment | 23 April 2010 | 28 January 2013 |
| SLFP | Anura Priyadharshana Yapa | Minister of Petroleum Industries | 28 January 2013 | 12 January 2015 |

== Deputy ministers, non-cabinet ministers and project ministers ==
| Party | Minister | Office | Took office | Left office |
|---|---|---|---|---|
| SLFP | Rohitha Abeygunawardena | Non-Cabinet Minister of Foreign Employment Promotion | 23 November 2005 | |
| SLFP | Rohitha Abeygunawardena | Deputy Minister of Posts and Telecommunication | 23 November 2005 | |
| SLFP | Rohitha Abeygunawardena | Deputy Minister of Ports and Aviation | 2010 | |
| SLFP | Rohitha Abeygunawardena | Deputy Minister of Ports and Highways | 2010 | 2010 |
| SLFP | Rohitha Abeygunawardena | Project Minister of Ports and Highways | 2013 | |
| UNP (D) | Lakshman Yapa Abeywardena | Deputy Minister of Economic Development | 2010 | 2013 |
| SLFP | Mahinda Yapa Abeywardena | Non-Cabinet Minister of Cultural and National Heritage | 23 November 2005 | |
| SLFP | Lasantha Alagiyawanna | Deputy Minister of Transport | 23 November 2005 | |
| SLFP | Lasantha Alagiyawanna | Deputy Minister of Construction, Engineering Services, Housing and Common Amenities | 2010 | |
| SLFP | Mahindananda Aluthgamage | Deputy Minister of Power | 23 November 2005 | 2010 |
| SLFP | Mahindananda Aluthgamage | Deputy Minister of Youth Affairs | 2010 | 2010 |
| SLFP | Mahinda Amaraweera | Non-Cabinet Minister of New Railroad Development | 23 November 2005 | |
| SLFP | Mahinda Amaraweera | Deputy Minister of Urban Development and Water Supply | 23 November 2005 | |
| SLFP | Mahinda Amaraweera | Deputy Minister of Health | 2010 | 2010 |
| ACMC | Ameer Ali | Non-Cabinet Minister of Disaster Relief Services | 23 November 2005 | |
| SLFP | Sarath Amunugama | Deputy Minister of Finance and Planning | 2010 | 2010 |
| SLFP | Sarath Amunugama | Deputy Minister of Finance and Planning | 2012 | |
| ACMC | Risad Badhiutheen | Non-Cabinet Minister of Resettlement | 23 November 2005 | |
| SLFP | Jagath Balasuriya | Deputy Minister of Labour & Productivity Improvement | 2010 | 2010 |
| UNP (D) | Indika Bandaranaike | Deputy Minister of Local Government and Provincial Councils | 2010 | |
| SLFP | Pandu Bandaranaike | Deputy Minister of Environment and Irrigation | 23 November 2005 | |
| SLFP | Pandu Bandaranaike | Deputy Minister of Indigenous Medicine | 2010 | |
| SLFP | Bandula Basnayake | Non-Cabinet Minister for Promotion of Botanical and Zoological Gardens | 23 November 2005 | |
| ACMC | Hussein Ahamed Bhaila | Deputy Minister of Plan Implementation | 23 November 2005 | |
| UNP (D) | A. R. M. Abdul Cader | Deputy Minister of Environment | 2010 | 2013 |
| UNP (D) | A. R. M. Abdul Cader | Deputy Minister of Environment & Renewable Energy | 2013 | |
| SLFP | S. M. Chandrasena | Non-Cabinet Minister of Agrarian Services and Development of Farmer Communities | 23 November 2005 | |
| SLFP | S. M. Chandrasena | Deputy Minister of Irrigation and Water Resources Management | 2010 | 2010 |
| SLFP | S. M. Chandrasena | Deputy Minister of Agrarian Services and Wildlife | 2012 | 2013 |
| SLFP | S. M. Chandrasena | Deputy Minister of Economic Development | 2013 | |
| SLFP | Reginald Cooray | Deputy Minister of Justice | 2010 | 2010 |
| SLFP | Wijaya Dahanayaka | Deputy Minister for Public Administration | 2010 | |
| SLFP | D. M. Dassanayake | Deputy Minister of Nation Building and Development | 23 November 2005 | |
| SLMC | Basheer Segu Dawood | Deputy Minister of Co-operatives and Internal Trade | 2010 | 2013 |
| NUW | Palani Digambaran | Deputy Minister of National Languages and Social Integration | 2014 | 2014 |
| SLFP | Duminda Dissanayake | Deputy Minister of Ports and Aviation | 2010 | 23 November 2005 |
| SLFP | Duminda Dissanayake | Deputy Minister of Posts and Telecommunication | 2010 | 2010 |
| SLFP | Duminda Dissanayake | Deputy Minister of Youth Affairs and Skills Development | 2010 | 2013 |
| SLFP | Lalith Dissanayake | Deputy Minister of Technology and Research | 2010 | 2010 |
| SLFP | Lalith Dissanayake | Deputy Minister of Health | 2010 | |
| NFF | P. Weerakumara Dissanayake | Deputy Minister of Traditional Industries and Small Enterprise Development | 2010 | |
| SLFP | Rohana Dissanayake | Deputy Minister of Finance and Planning | 23 November 2005 | |
| SLFP | Rohana Dissanayake | Deputy Minister of Transport | 2010 | |
| SLFP | Salinda Dissanayake | Non-Cabinet Minister of Coconut Development | 23 November 2005 | |
| SLFP | Salinda Dissanayake | Deputy Minister of Science and Technology | 23 November 2005 | |
| SLFP | Salinda Dissanayake | Deputy Minister of Plantation and Industries | 2010 | 2010 |
| UNP (D) | Nandimithra Ekanayake | Deputy Minister of Higher Education | 2010 | 2014 |
| SLFP | T. B. Ekanayake | Non-Cabinet Minister of Road Development | 23 November 2005 | |
| SLFP | T. B. Ekanayake | Deputy Minister of Public Administration | 23 November 2005 | |
| SLFP | T. B. Ekanayake | Deputy Minister of Education | 2010 | 2010 |
| UNP (D) | W. B. Ekanayake | Deputy Minister of Disaster Management | 2010 | 2010 |
| UNP (D) | W. B. Ekanayake | Deputy Minister of Irrigation and Water Resources Management | 2010 | |
| SLFP | Milroy Fernando | Non-Cabinet Minister of Plantation Industries | 23 November 2005 | |
| SLFP | Milroy Fernando | Deputy Minister of Rural Economic Development | 23 November 2005 | |
| CPSL | Chandrasiri Gajadeera | Non-Cabinet Minister of Home Affairs | 23 November 2005 | |
| CPSL | Chandrasiri Gajadeera | Deputy Minister of Fisheries Housing Development | 23 November 2005 | |
| CPSL | Chandrasiri Gajadeera | Deputy Minister of Finance and Planning | 2010 | 2010 |
| SLFP | Siripala Gamalath | Deputy Minister of Consumer Services and Agricultural Marketing Development | 23 November 2005 | |
| SLFP | Siripala Gamalath | Deputy Minister of Lands and Land Development | 2010 | |
| DPF | Praba Ganesan | Deputy Minister of Telecommunication and Information Technology | 2014 | |
| UNP (D) | Mohan Lal Grero | Deputy Minister of Education | 2013 | |
| SLFP | Sarath Kumara Gunaratna | Deputy Minister of State Resources and Enterprise Development | 2010 | 2013 |
| SLFP | Sarath Kumara Gunaratna | Deputy Minister of Fisheries and Aquatic Resources Development | 2013 | |
| UNP (D) | Earl Gunasekara | Deputy Minister of Plantation and Industries | 2010 | |
| SLFP | Hemal Gunasekara | Deputy Minister of Cooperative and Internal Trade | 2013 | |
| PUF | Gitanjana Gunawardena | Deputy Minister of External Affairs | 2010 | 2010 |
| PUF | Gitanjana Gunawardena | Deputy Minister of Finance and Planning | 2010 | 2012 |
| PUF | Gitanjana Gunawardena | Deputy Minister of Civil Aviation | 2012 | |
| SLFP | M. K. D. S. Gunawardena | Deputy Minister of Buddhasasana and Religious Affairs | 2010 | 2014 |
| SLFP | Sarana Gunawardena | Deputy Minister of Petroleum Industries | 2010 | |
| SLFP | Jayarathna Herath | Deputy Minister of Healthcare and Nutrition | 23 November 2005 | 2013 |
| SLFP | Jayarathna Herath | Deputy Minister of Industry and Commerce | 2010 | 2013 |
| ACMC | M. L. Alim Mohammad Hisbullah | Deputy Minister of Child Development and Women's Affairs | 2010 | 2013 |
| ACMC | M. L. Alim Mohammad Hisbullah | Deputy Minister of Economic Development | 2013 | |
| NC | Anver Ismail | Non-Cabinet Minister of Irrigation | 23 November 2005 | |
| SLFP | Premalal Jayasekara | Deputy Minister of Rural Industries and Self-employment Promotion | 23 November 2005 | |
| SLFP | Premalal Jayasekara | Deputy Minister of Power and Energy | 2010 | |
| SLFP | Sanath Jayasuriya | Deputy Minister of Postal Services | 2013 | |
| SLFP | Tissa Karalliyadde | Non-Cabinet Minister of Indigenous Medicine | 23 November 2005 | |
| SLFP | Tissa Karalliyadde | Deputy Minister of Religious Affairs | 23 November 2005 | |
| SLFP | Nirmala Kotalawala | Deputy Minister of Education | 23 November 2005 | 2010 |
| SLFP | Nirmala Kotalawala | Deputy Minister of Highways | 2010 | 2010 |
| SLFP | Nirmala Kotalawala | Deputy Minister of Ports and Highways | 2010 | 2013 |
| SLFP | Nirmala Kotalawala | Project Minister of Ports and Highways | 2013 | |
| SLFP | Jeewan Kumaranatunga | Non-Cabinet Minister of Sports and Youth Affairs | 23 November 2005 | |
| SLFP | M. N. Abdul Majeed | Non-Cabinet Minister of Co-operatives and Co-operative Development | 23 November 2005 | |
| SLFP | M. N. Abdul Majeed | Deputy Minister of Provincial Councils and Local Government | 23 November 2005 | |
| SLFP | H. R. Mithrapala | Deputy Minister of Trade & Commerce | 23 November 2005 | |
| SLFP | H. R. Mithrapala | Deputy Minister of Livestock Development | 2010 | |
| SLFP | V. Muralitharan | Deputy Minister of Resettlement | 2010 | |
| SLFP | Faiszer Musthapha | Deputy Minister of Environment | 2010 | 2010 |
| SLFP | Faiszer Musthapha | Deputy Minister of Technology and Research | 2010 | 2013 |
| SLFP | Faiszer Musthapha | Deputy Minister of Investment Promotion | 2013 | 2014 |
| SLFP | Nishantha Muthuhettigama | Deputy Minister of Minor Export Crop Promotion | 2013 | |
| SLFP | Sarath Chandrasiri Muthukumarana | Deputy Minister of Rehabilitation & Prison Reforms | 2013 | |
| LSSP | Y. G. Padmasiri | Deputy Minister of Agriculture | 2013 | |
| SLFP | Dilan Perera | Deputy Minister of Justice and Law Reforms | 23 November 2005 | |
| SLFP | Dilan Perera | Deputy Minister of Constitutional Affairs and National Integration | 23 November 2005 | |
| SLFP | Dilan Perera | Deputy Minister of Public Administration and Home Affairs | 2010 | |
| SLFP | Felix Perera | Non-Cabinet Minister of Fisheries and Aquatic Resources | 23 November 2005 | |
| SLFP | Lakshman Wasantha Perera | Deputy Minister of Industry and Commerce | 2013 | |
| UNP (D) | Neomal Perera | Deputy Minister of Co-operatives and Internal Trade | 2010 | 2010 |
| UNP (D) | Neomal Perera | Deputy Minister of External Affairs | 2010 | |
| SLFP | Victor Anthony Perera | Deputy Minister of Coconut Development and Janatha Estate Development | 2013 | |
| UNP (D) | Susantha Punchinilame | Deputy Minister of Fisheries and Aquatic Resources Development | 2010 | 2013 |
| UNP (D) | Susantha Punchinilame | Deputy Minister of Economic Development | 2013 | |
| SLFP | A. P. Jagath Pushpakumara | Non-Cabinet Minister of Rural Livelihood Development | 23 November 2005 | 2010 |
| SLFP | A. P. Jagath Pushpakumara | Deputy Minister of Social Services and Social Welfare | 23 November 2005 | 2010 |
| SLFP | A. P. Jagath Pushpakumara | Deputy Minister of Agriculture | 2010 | 2010 |
| UCPF | Velusami Radhakrishnan | Deputy Minister of Botanical Gardens and Public Recreation | 2014 | 2014 |
| SLFP | Chamal Rajapaksa | Non-Cabinet Minister of Agricultural Development | 23 November 2005 | |
| SLFP | Nirupama Rajapaksa | Deputy Minister of Water Supply and Drainage | 2010 | |
| SLFP | Wijeyadasa Rajapakshe | Non-Cabinet Minister for State Banks Development | 23 November 2005 | |
| SLFP | Jayatissa Ranaweera | Non-Cabinet Minister of Textile Industry Development | 23 November 2005 | |
| SLFP | Jayatissa Ranaweera | Deputy Minister of Mahaweli Development | 23 November 2005 | |
| SLFP | C. B. Rathnayake | Non-Cabinet Minister of Estate Infrastructure and Livestock Development | 23 November 2005 | |
| SLFP | Mervyn Silva | Deputy Minister of Labour | 23 November 2005 | 2010 |
| SLFP | Mervyn Silva | Deputy Minister of Mass Media and Information | 2010 | 2010 |
| SLFP | Mervyn Silva | Deputy Minister of Highways | 2010 | 2010 |
| CWC | Muthu Sivalingam | Deputy Minister of Economic Development | 2010 | |
| SLFP | Ranjith Siyambalapitiya | Deputy Minister of Finance and Planning | 23 November 2005 | |
| SLFP | Ranjith Siyambalapitiya | Deputy Minister of Higher Education | 23 November 2005 | |
| SLFP | Ranjith Siyambalapitiya | Deputy Minister of Economic Development | 2010 | 2010 |
| SLFP | Sripathi Sooriyarachchi | Non-Cabinet Minister of Skills Development and Public Enterprise Reforms | 23 November 2005 | |
| SLFP | Sripathi Sooriyarachchi | Deputy Minister of Enterprise Development and Investment Promotion | 23 November 2005 | |
| SLFP | Gamini Vijith Vijithamuni Soysa | Deputy Minister of Rehabilitation and Prison Reforms | 2010 | 2010 |
| SLFP | Gamini Vijith Vijithamuni Soysa | Deputy Minister of Education | 2010 | 2013 |
| UNP (D) | C. A. Suriyaarachchi | Deputy Minister of Social Services | 2010 | |
| SLFP | Dayasritha Thissera | Deputy Minister of Ports and Aviation | 23 November 2005 | |
| SLFP | Dayasritha Thissera | Deputy Minister of Ports and Aviation | 2010 | 2010 |
| SLFP | Pavithra Devi Wanniarachchi | Non-Cabinet Minister of Samurdhi and Poverty Alleviation | 23 November 2005 | |
| SLFP | W. A. Wiswa Warnapala | Non-Cabinet Minister of Parliamentary Affairs | 23 November 2005 | |
| SLFP | Gunaratna Weerakoon | Non-Cabinet Minister of Regional Development | 23 November 2005 | |
| SLFP | Gunaratna Weerakoon | Deputy Minister of Housing and Construction | 23 November 2005 | |
| SLFP | Gunaratna Weerakoon | Deputy Minister of National Heritage and Cultural Affairs | 2010 | 2010 |
| SLFP | Sarath Weerasekara | Deputy Minister of Labour and Labour Relations | 2013 | |
| SLFP | Kumara Welgama | Non-Cabinet Minister of Industrial Development | 23 November 2005 | |
| SLFP | Ratnasiri Wickremanayake | Deputy Minister of Defence | 23 November 2005 | |
| SLFP | Duleep Wijesekera | Deputy Minister of Disaster Management | 2010 | |

Government offices
| Preceded by Kumaratunga cabinet | Cabinets of Sri Lanka; 2005–2015 | Succeeded by Sirisena cabinet |
