= First Sirisena cabinet =

- Cabinet of Sri Lanka

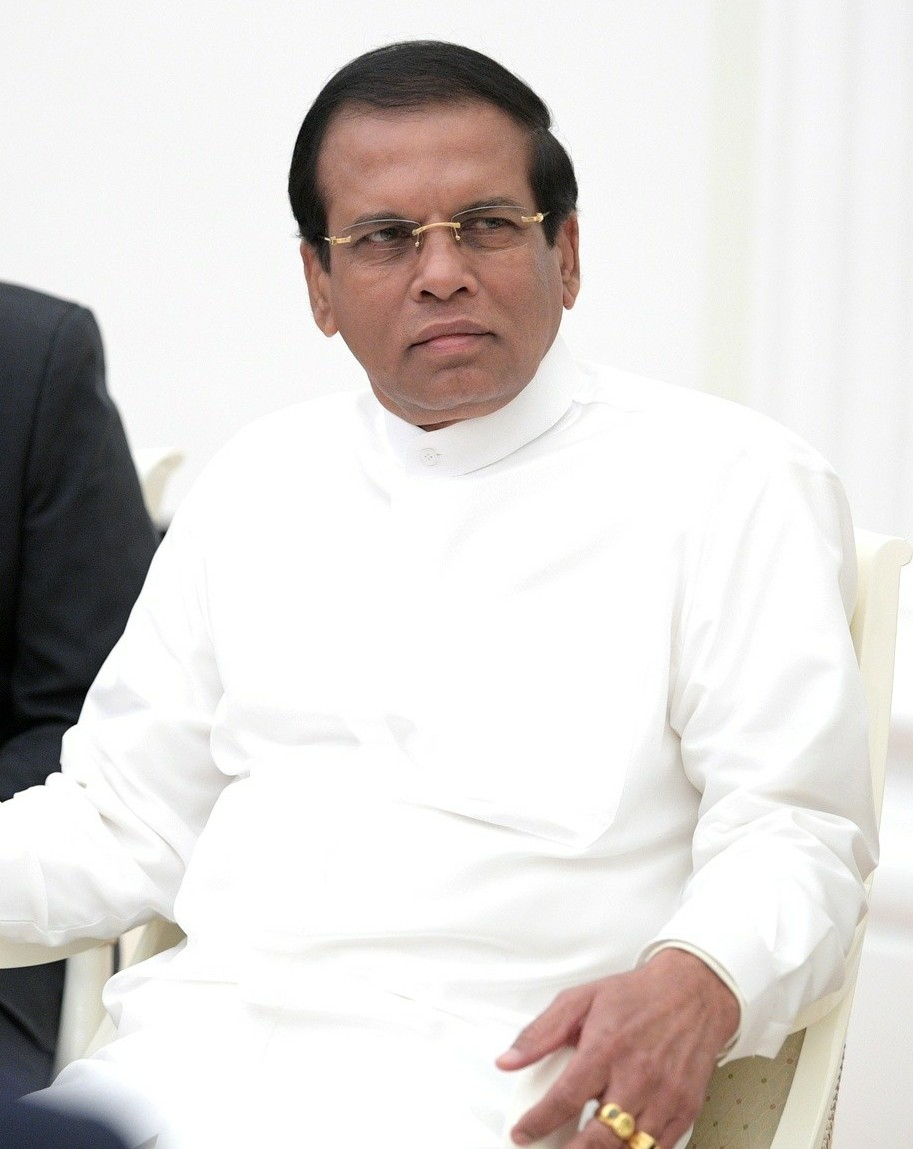
- Date formed: 12 January 2015
- Date dissolved: 17 August 2015

People and organisations
- Head of state: Maithripala Sirisena
- Head of government: Maithripala Sirisena
- Deputy head of government: Ranil Wickremesinghe
- Total no. of members: 89
- Member parties: United National Party; Sri Lanka Freedom Party
- Status in legislature: Minority government
- Opposition party: Sri Lanka Freedom Party
- Opposition leader: Nimal Siripala de Silva

History
- Election: 2015 presidential
- Outgoing election: 2015 parliamentary
- Legislature term: 14th
- Predecessor: Mahinda Rajapaksa
- Successor: Sirisena II

The first Sirisena cabinet was a central government of Sri Lanka led by President Maithripala Sirisena. It was formed in January 2015 after the presidential election and ended in August 2015 following the parliamentary election.

== Cabinet members ==
Ministers appointed under article 43(1) of the constitution.

Name	Portrait	Party	Office	Took office	Left office	^{Refs.}
Maithripala Sirisena		Sri Lanka Freedom Party	President	9 January 2015	(Note: Continued to hold same office in next cabinet.)	
Maithripala Sirisena		Sri Lanka Freedom Party	Minister of Defence	9 January 2015		
Maithripala Sirisena		Sri Lanka Freedom Party	Minister of Mahaweli Development and Environment	12 January 2015		
Ranil Wickremesinghe		United National Party	Prime Minister	9 January 2015		
Ranil Wickremesinghe		United National Party	Minister of Policy Planning, Economics Affairs, Child, Youth and Cultural Affairs	12 January 2015	17 August 2015	
Lakshman Yapa Abeywardena		Sri Lanka Freedom Party	Minister of Parliamentary Affairs	29 May 2015	17 August 2015	
Mahinda Yapa Abeywardena		Sri Lanka Freedom Party	Minister of Parliamentary Affairs	22 March 2015	21 May 2015	
John Amaratunga		United National Party	Minister of Public Order, Disaster Management and Christian Affairs	12 January 2015	22 March 2015	
John Amaratunga		United National Party	Minister of Public Order and Christian Religious Affairs	22 March 2015	17 August 2015	
Mahinda Amaraweera		Sri Lanka Freedom Party	Minister of Fisheries and Aquatic Resources Development	22 March 2015		
Sarath Amunugama		Sri Lanka Freedom Party	Minister of Higher Education and Research	22 March 2015	17 August 2015	
Thalatha Atukorale		United National Party	Minister of Foreign Employment	12 January 2015		
Risad Badhiutheen		All Ceylon Makkal Congress	Minister of Industry and Commerce	12 January 2015		
R. M. Ranjith Madduma Bandara		United National Party	Minister of Internal Transport	12 January 2015	17 August 2015	
Reginald Cooray		Sri Lanka Freedom Party	Minister of Aviation	22 March 2015	17 August 2015	
Palani Digambaran		National Union of Workers	Minister of Plantation Infrastructure Development	12 January 2015	17 August 2015	
Duminda Dissanayake		Sri Lanka Freedom Party	Minister of Irrigation and Agriculture	12 January 2015	22 March 2015	
Duminda Dissanayake		Sri Lanka Freedom Party	Minister of Agriculture	22 March 2015		
Navin Dissanayake		United National Party	Minister of Tourism and Sports	12 January 2015	17 August 2015	
S. B. Dissanayake		Sri Lanka Freedom Party	Minister of Rural Economic Affairs	22 March 2015	17 August 2015	
A. H. M. Fowzie		Sri Lanka Freedom Party	Minister of Disaster Management	22 March 2015	17 August 2015	
Piyasena Gamage		Sri Lanka Freedom Party	Minister of Skills Development and Vocational Training	22 March 2015	17 August 2015	
M. K. D. S. Gunawardena		Sri Lanka Freedom Party	Minister of Lands	12 January 2015		
Rauff Hakeem		Sri Lanka Muslim Congress	Minister of Urban Development, Water Supply and Drainage	12 January 2015	17 August 2015	
M. H. A. Haleem		United National Party	Minister of Muslim Religious Affairs and Posts	21 January 2015	17 August 2015	
P. Harrison		United National Party	Minister of Social Services, Welfare and Livestock Development	12 January 2015	17 August 2015	
Kabir Hashim		United National Party	Minister of Highways, Higher Education and Investment Promotion	12 January 2015	22 March 2015	
Kabir Hashim		United National Party	Minister of Highways and Investment Promotion	22 March 2015	17 August 2015	
Chandrani Bandara Jayasinghe		United National Party	Minister of Women's Affairs	12 January 2015	17 August 2015	
Karu Jayasuriya		United National Party	Minister of Buddha Sasana	12 January 2015	17 August 2015	
Karu Jayasuriya		United National Party	Minister of Public Administration, Provincial Councils, Local Government and Democratic Governance	12 January 2015	22 March 2015	
Karu Jayasuriya		United National Party	Minister of Public Administration, Local Government and Democratic Governance	22 March 2015	17 August 2015	
Akila Viraj Kariyawasam		United National Party	Minister of Education	12 January 2015		
Ravi Karunanayake		United National Party	Minister of Finance	12 January 2015		
Gayantha Karunatileka		United National Party	Minister of Mass Media and Parliamentary Affairs	12 January 2015	22 March 2015	
Gayantha Karunatileka		United National Party	Minister of Mass Media	22 March 2015	17 August 2015	
Lakshman Kiriella		United National Party	Minister of Plantation Industries	12 January 2015	17 August 2015	
S. B. Nawinne		Sri Lanka Freedom Party	Minister of Labour	22 March 2015	17 August 2015	
Felix Perera		Sri Lanka Freedom Party	Minister of Special Projects	22 March 2015	17 August 2015	
Gamini Jayawickrama Perera		United National Party	Minister of Food Security	12 January 2015	17 August 2015	
M. Joseph Michael Perera		United National Party	Minister of Home Affairs and Fisheries	12 January 2015	22 March 2015	
M. Joseph Michael Perera		United National Party	Minister of Home Affairs	22 March 2015	17 August 2015	
Sajith Premadasa		United National Party	Minister of Housing and Samurdhi	12 January 2015	17 August 2015	
Wijeyadasa Rajapakshe		United National Party	Minister of Justice and Labour Relations	12 January 2015	22 March 2015	
Wijeyadasa Rajapakshe		United National Party	Minister of Justice	22 March 2015		
Arjuna Ranatunga		Sri Lanka Freedom Party	Minister of Ports, Shipping and Aviation	12 January 2015	22 March 2015	
Arjuna Ranatunga		Sri Lanka Freedom Party	Minister of Ports and Shipping	22 March 2015		
Champika Ranawaka		Jathika Hela Urumaya	Minister of Power and Energy	12 January 2015	17 August 2015	
Mangala Samaraweera		United National Party	Minister of Foreign Affairs	12 January 2015		
Rajitha Senaratne		Sri Lanka Freedom Party	Minister of Health and Indigenous Medicine	12 January 2015		
Gamini Vijith Vijithamuni Soysa		Sri Lanka Freedom Party	Minister of Irrigation	22 March 2015	17 August 2015	
D. M. Swaminathan		United National Party	Minister of Resettlement, Reconstruction and Hindu Religious Affairs	12 January 2015	17 August 2015	
Janaka Bandara Tennakoon		Sri Lanka Freedom Party	Minister of Provincial Councils and Regional Development	22 March 2015	24 July 2015	

== State ministers ==
Ministers appointed under article 44(1) of the constitution.

Name	Portrait	Party	Office	Took office	Left office	^{Refs.}
Hasen Ali		Sri Lanka Muslim Congress	State Minister of Health	21 January 2015	17 August 2015	
Palitha Range Bandara		United National Party	State Minister of Power and Energy	12 January 2015	17 August 2015	
Pandu Bandaranaike		Sri Lanka Freedom Party	State Minister of Public Administration and Democratic Governance	29 May 2015	17 August 2015	
Nandimithra Ekanayake		Sri Lanka Freedom Party	State Minister of Culture	12 January 2015	17 August 2015	
Hemal Gunasekara		Sri Lanka Freedom Party	State Minister of Housing and Samurdhi	29 May 2015	17 August 2015	
Jeewan Kumaranatunga		Sri Lanka Freedom Party	State Minister of Labour	22 March 2015	17 August 2015	
Faiszer Musthapha		Sri Lanka Freedom Party	State Minister of Aviation	12 January 2015	9 February 2015	
Dilan Perera		Sri Lanka Freedom Party	State Minister of Housing and Samurdhi	22 March 2015	21 May 2015	
Niroshan Perera		United National Party	State Minister of Youth Affairs	12 January 2015	17 August 2015	
Velusami Radhakrishnan		Up-Country People's Front	State Minister of Education	12 January 2015		
C. B. Rathnayake		Sri Lanka Freedom Party	State Minister of Public Administration and Democratic Governance	22 March 2015	21 May 2015	
Mahinda Samarasinghe		Sri Lanka Freedom Party	State Minister of Finance	22 March 2015	17 August 2015	
Rosy Senanayake		United National Party	State Minister of Children's Affairs	12 January 2015	17 August 2015	
Ranjith Siyambalapitiya		Sri Lanka Freedom Party	State Minister of Environment	29 May 2015	17 August 2015	
K. Velayudam		United National Party	State Minister of Plantation Industries	12 January 2015	17 August 2015	
Pavithra Devi Wanniarachchi		Sri Lanka Freedom Party	State Minister of Environment	22 March 2015	21 May 2015	
Dilip Wedaarachchi		United National Party	State Minister of Fisheries	12 January 2015	17 August 2015	
Rajiva Wijesinha		Liberal Party	State Minister of Higher Education	12 January 2015	17 February 2015	
Ruwan Wijewardene		United National Party	State Minister of Defence	12 January 2015		

== Deputy ministers ==
Ministers appointed under article 45(1) of the constitution.

Name	Portrait	Party	Office	Took office	Left office	^{Refs.}
Lakshman Yapa Abeywardena			Deputy Minister of Aviation	22 March 2015	17 August 2015	
Lasantha Alagiyawanna		Sri Lanka Freedom Party	Deputy Minister of Rural Economic Affairs	22 March 2015	16 July 2015	
Ameer Ali		All Ceylon Makkal Congress	Deputy Minister of Housing and Samurdhi	21 January 2015	17 August 2015	
Wasantha Aluwihare		United National Party	Deputy Minister of Mahaweli Development and Environment	21 January 2015	17 August 2015	
K. W. Shantha Bandara		Sri Lanka Freedom Party	Deputy Minister of Mass Media	22 March 2015	30 July 2015	
Wijaya Dahanayake		Sri Lanka Freedom Party	Deputy Minister of Public Order and Christian Religious Affairs	10 June 2015	17 August 2015	
Harsha de Silva		United National Party	Deputy Minister of Policy Planning, Economics Affairs, Child, Youth and Cultural Affairs	12 January 2015	17 August 2015	
Lalith Dissanayake		Sri Lanka Freedom Party	Deputy Minister of Irrigation	22 March 2015	17 August 2015	
Sudarshani Fernandopulle		Sri Lanka Freedom Party	Deputy Minister of Higher Education and Research	22 March 2015	16 July 2015	
Anoma Gamage		United National Party	Deputy Minister of Irrigation and Agriculture	12 January 2015	22 March 2015	
Anoma Gamage		United National Party	Deputy Minister of Agriculture	22 March 2015	17 August 2015	
Dunesh Gankanda		United National Party	Deputy Minister of Urban Development, Water Supply and Drainage Board	14 January 2015	17 August 2015	
Sanath Jayasuriya		Sri Lanka Freedom Party	Deputy Minister of Provincial Councils and Regional Development	10 June 2015	17 August 2015	
Tissa Karalliyadde		Sri Lanka Freedom Party	Deputy Minister of Buddha Sasana and Democratic Rule	22 March 2015	2 April 2015	
Vijayakala Maheswaran		United National Party	Deputy Minister of Women's Affairs	12 January 2015	17 August 2015	
Ajith Perera		United National Party	Deputy Minister of Foreign Affairs	12 January 2015	17 August 2015	
A. D. Champika Premadasa		United National Party	Deputy Minister of Industry and Commerce	12 January 2015	17 August 2015	
A. P. Jagath Pushpakumara		Sri Lanka Freedom Party	Deputy Minister of Plantation Industries	22 March 2015	17 August 2015	
Ranjan Ramanayake		United National Party	Deputy Minister of Social Services, Welfare and Livestock Development	21 January 2015	17 August 2015	
Wasantha Senanayake		United National Party	Deputy Minister of Tourism and Sports	12 January 2015	17 August 2015	
Sujeewa Senasinghe		United National Party	Deputy Minister of Justice and Labour Relations	12 January 2015	22 March 2015	
Sujeewa Senasinghe		United National Party	Deputy Minister of Justice	22 March 2015	17 August 2015	
Lakshman Senewiratne			Deputy Minister of Disaster Management	22 March 2015	17 August 2015	
Ranjith Siyambalapitiya		Sri Lanka Freedom Party	Deputy Minister of Home Affairs	22 March 2015	17 August 2015	
Thilanga Sumathipala		Sri Lanka Freedom Party	Deputy Minister of Skills Development and Vocational Training	10 June 2015	17 August 2015	
C. A. Suriyaarachchi			Deputy Minister of Lands	29 May 2015	17 August 2015	
Dayasritha Thissera		Sri Lanka Freedom Party	Deputy Minister of Fisheries	22 March 2015	17 August 2015	
M. S. Thowfeek		Sri Lanka Muslim Congress	Deputy Minister of Internal Transport	21 January 2015	17 August 2015	
Erik Weerawardena		Sri Lanka Freedom Party	Deputy Minister of Ports and Shipping	10 June 2015	16 July 2015	
Eran Wickramaratne		United National Party	Deputy Minister of Highways, Higher Education and Investment Promotion	12 January 2015	22 March 2015	
Eran Wickramaratne		United National Party	Deputy Minister of Highways and Investment Promotion	22 March 2015	17 August 2015	
Neranjan Wickremasinghe^{✝}		Sri Lanka Freedom Party	Deputy Minister of Public Order and Christian Religious Affairs	22 March 2015	12 May 2015	

✝ _{Died while in office.}
