= Hunais Farook =

Sri Lankan politician

Unaiz Farook (born 15 March 1973) is a Sri Lankan politician who represents the Vanni multi-member electoral district in the Sri Lankan Parliament. He is a member of the United People's Freedom Alliance and was elected in the 2010 Parliamentary elections.
