= M. S. M. Aslam =

Sri Lankan politician

Hon. M. S. M. Aslam MP

Treasurer, Sri Lanka Muslim Congress

Member of Parliament for National List
- Incumbent
- Assumed office 2010

Personal details
- Party: Sri Lanka Muslim Congress
- Other political affiliations: United National Front

Mohamed Saleem Mohamed Aslam is a Sri Lankan politician and a member of the Parliament of Sri Lanka.

Aslam was appointed as the United National Front's National List MP in the Sri Lankan Parliament in April 2010.

Aslam is the treasurer of the Sri Lanka Muslim Congress.
