= Ministry of Public Relations and Public Affairs =

Agency overview
- Jurisdiction: Sri Lanka
- Employees: 37
- Annual budget: Rs .249,480 Billion
- Minister responsible: Mervyn Silva
- Agency executive: H. P. C. Herath, Secretary
- Website: mprpa.lk

The Ministry of Public Relations and Public Affairs is the Sri Lankan government ministry responsible for “building up a public service, dedicated to enhance public relations and perform public affairs efficiently which support the economic and social development of Sri Lanka within the government policies through proper coordination with other government organisation.”

== List of ministers ==
Minister of Public Relations and Public Affairs of Sri Lanka
- Incumbent; Mervyn Silva since 22 November 2010
- Ministry of Public Relations and Public Affairs
- Appointer: Mahinda Rajapaksa
- Website: mprpa.lk

The Minister of Public Relations & Public Affairs is an appointment in the Cabinet of Sri Lanka.

Parties

Sri Lanka Freedom Party United National Party

Name	Portrait	Party	Tenure	President
Mervyn Silva		Sri Lanka Freedom Party	22 November 2010 – Present	Mahinda Rajapaksa

== See also ==
- List of ministries of Sri Lanka
