= Nimal Wijesinghe =

Sri Lankan politician

Hon. Nimal Wijesinghe

Member of Parliament for Kurunegala District
- Incumbent
- Assumed office 22 April 2010

Personal details
- Born: 15 December 1969 (age 56)
- Party: United National Party
- Other political affiliations: United National Front
- Occupation: Businessman

Nimal Senarath Wijesinghe (born 15 December 1969) is a Sri Lankan politician and member of the Parliament of Sri Lanka. He belongs to the United National Party.
