= Jayantha Ketagoda =

Sri Lankan politician

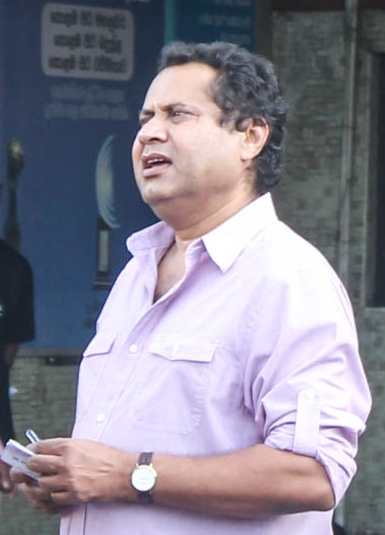
Jayantha Ketagoda in 2014.

Jayantha Ketagoda is a Sri Lankan politician and a member of the Parliament of Sri Lanka, having replaced Sarath Fonseka, who was imprisoned. He is a member of the Democratic National Alliance.
