= Ministry of Rehabilitation and Prison Reforms =

Government ministry of Sri Lanka

State Ministry of Prison management and Prisoner's rehabilitation

Agency overview
- Formed: 22 November 2010
- Jurisdiction: Sri Lanka
- Employees: 5,236
- Annual budget: Rs 5.718,415 Billion
- Minister responsible: Chandrasiri Gajadeera
- Deputy Minister responsible: Sarath Chandrasiri Muthukumarana
- Agency executive: G. S. Withanage, Secretary
- Website: reprimin.gov.lk

The Ministry of Rehabilitation and Prison Reforms is the Sri Lankan government ministry responsible for the “rehabilitation of detainees and integration into the society and rehabilitation of victims of violence and effected properties and enterprises by following methodologies of good governance, using financial and human resources efficiently and productively and by proper supervision and co-ordination of the departments and other institutions under the ministry.”

== List of ministers ==
Minister of Rehabilitation and Prison Reforms of Sri Lanka
- Incumbent --Vacant-- since 22 November 2010
- Ministry of Rehabilitation and Prison Reforms
- Appointer: Mahinda Rajapaksa
- Website: reprimin.gov.lk

The Minister of Rehabilitation and Prison Reforms is an appointment in the Cabinet of Sri Lanka.

Parties

Sri Lanka Freedom Party Communist Party of Sri Lanka Sri Lanka Podujana Peramuna

Name	Portrait	Party	Tenure	President
Chandrasiri Gajadeera		Communist Party of Sri Lanka	22 November 2010 – 12 January 2015	Mahinda Rajapaksa
Dr.Sudarshani Fernandopulle		Sri Lanka Podujana Peramuna	April 2020 – 30 November 2020	Gotabaya Rajapaksa
Lohan Ratwatte		Sri Lanka Podujana Peramuna	02 December 2020 – 15 September 2021	Gotabaya Rajapaksa
Ali Sabry		Sri Lanka Podujana Peramuna	26 April 2022 – 9 May 2022	Gotabaya Rajapaksa

== See also ==
- List of ministries of Sri Lanka
