= Ministry of Private Transport Services =

Agency overview
- Formed: 22 November 2010; 15 years ago
- Jurisdiction: Sri Lanka
- Employees: 37
- Annual budget: Rs .744,725 Billion
- Minister responsible: C. B. Rathnayake
- Agency executive: Victor Samaraweera, Secretary
- Website: ptsmin.gov.lk

The Ministry of Private Transport Services is the Sri Lankan government ministry responsible for “providing passengers with an efficient and comfortable service accompanied by modern technology; a service with an ability to fulfill passenger-demands and trusted by passengers; and through such service, to contribute maximally to the progression of other areas of economy.”

== List of ministers ==
Minister of Private Transport Services of Sri Lanka
- Incumbent; C. B. Rathnayake since 22 November 2010
- Ministry of Private Transport Services
- Appointer: Mahinda Rajapaksa
- Inaugural holder: C. B. Rathnayake
- Formation: 22 November 2010
- Website: ptsmin.gov.lk

The Minister of Private Transport Services is an appointment in the Cabinet of Sri Lanka.

Parties

Sri Lanka Freedom Party United National Party

Name	Portrait	Party	Tenure	President
C. B. Rathnayake		Sri Lanka Freedom Party	22 November 2010 – Present	Mahinda Rajapaksa

== See also ==
- List of ministries of Sri Lanka
