= Kamala Ranathunga =

Sri Lankan politician

Kamala Ranathunga (also spelled Ranatunge) (born 19 October 1937) is a Sri Lankan politician and a member of the Parliament of Sri Lanka. She belongs to the Sri Lanka Freedom Party which nominated her on its national list to the Parliament of Sri Lanka.
