= A. H. M. Azwer =

Sri Lankan politician (1937–2017)

Hon. A. H. M. Azwer MP

Member of Parliament for National List
- In office 1989–1994
- In office 2010–2014
- Succeeded by: Ameer Ali

Personal details
- Born: 8 February 1937 Sri Lanka
- Died: 29 August 2017 (aged 80)
- Party: Sri Lanka Freedom Party
- Other political affiliations: United People's Freedom Alliance
- Education: Zahira College, Colombo

Abdul Hameed Mohamed Azwer (8 February 1937 – 29 August 2017) was a Sri Lankan politician and a Member of the Parliament of Sri Lanka. He was of the Sri Lanka Freedom Party which nominated him on its national list to the Parliament of Sri Lanka.
