= Achala Jagodage =

Sri Lankan politician

Hon. Achala Jagodage MP

Personal details
- Born: Sri Lanka

Achala Jagodage (born 26 July 1973) is a Sri Lankan politician and a member of the Parliament of Sri Lanka.
