= Sanee Rohana Kodithuvakku =

Sri Lankan politician (born 1961)

Hon. Sanee Rohana Kodithuvakku MP

Member of Parliament for Ratnapura District
- Incumbent
- Assumed office 22 April 2010

Personal details
- Born: 15 February 1961 (age 65)
- Party: Sri Lanka Freedom Party
- Other political affiliations: United People's Freedom Alliance
- Occupation: Farmer

Sanee Rohana Kodithuvakku (born 15 February 1961) is a Sri Lankan politician and member of the Parliament of Sri Lanka. He belongs to the Sri Lanka Freedom Party.
