= Ministry of State Resources and Enterprise Development =

Government ministry of Sri Lanka

Agency overview
- Jurisdiction: Government of Sri Lanka
- Minister responsible: Minister of State Resources and Enterprise Development
- Website: sredmin.gov.lk

The Ministry of State Resources and Enterprise Development is a ministry in the Government of Sri Lanka.

== List of State Resources and Enterprise Development Ministers ==
Minister of State Resources and Enterprise Development of Sri Lanka
- Ministry of State Resources and Enterprise Development
- Website: Ministry of State Resources and Enterprise Development

The Minister of State Resources and Enterprise Development is an appointment in the Cabinet of Sri Lanka.

Parties

Sri Lanka Freedom Party United National Party

Name	Portrait	Party	Tenure	President
Dayasritha Thissera		Sri Lanka Freedom Party	22 November 2010 – 9 January 2015	Mahinda Rajapaksa
