= K. W. Shantha Bandara =

Sri Lankan politician

Kuda Widanalage Shantha Bandara is a Sri Lankan politician, a member of the Parliament of Sri Lanka for national list from 8 January 2019.He was a member of the parliament for Kurunegala from 2010 to 2015.
