= Nishantha Muthuhettigamage =

Sri Lankan politician

Hon. Nishantha Muthuhettigamage MP

Member of Parliament for Galle District
- In office 2010–2020

Personal details
- Born: Nishantha Muthuhettigamage
- Party: Sri Lanka Freedom Party
- Education: Mahinda College, Galle
- Occupation: Proprietor

Nishantha Muthuhettigamage is a Sri Lankan politician, a member of the Parliament of Sri Lanka. He belongs to the Sri Lanka Freedom Party. He is the former deputy minister for Ports and Shipping in Sri Lanka.
