= Neranjan Wickremasinghe =

Sri Lankan politician (1961–2015)

Neranjan Wickramasinghe (6 June 1961 – 12 May 2015) was a Sri Lankan politician, a member of the Parliament of Sri Lanka. He was of the Sri Lanka Freedom Party. His father is former deputy minister D.B wickramasinghe

== See also ==
- List of political families in Sri Lanka
