= Mahindananda Aluthgamage =

Sri Lankan politician

- මහින්දානන්ද අලුත්ගමගේ மஹிந்தானந்த அளுத்கமகே

Minister for Sport
- In office 22 November 2010 – 12 January 2015
- President: Mahinda Rajapaksa
- Prime Minister: D. M. Jayaratne
- Preceded by: C. B. Rathnayake
- Succeeded by: Navin Dissanayake

Ministry of Power and Energy

Member of Parliament for Kandy District
- In office 2000 – 24 September 2024

Personal details
- Born: 21 November 1964 (age 61) Nawalapitiya, Central Province, Sri Lanka
- Party: Sri Lanka Freedom Party
- Spouse: Senani Jayarathne
- Education: Royal College, Colombo; Gangasiripura Vidyalaya Gampola
- Occupation: Politician
- Criminal information
- Status: Incarcerated
- Conviction: Corruption
- Penalty: 20 years

Mahindananda Aluthgamage (born 21 November 1964) is a Sri Lankan former politician who served as the Minister of Sports. He has also served as Deputy Minister of Power and Energy.

He was elected as a Member of Parliament representing the Kandy Electoral District. He was educated at Gangasiripura Vidyalaya Gampola and Royal College Colombo. He lost his position as a minister in 2015 when President Mahinda Rajapaksha was defeated in the 2015 presidential election. He is well known for his ability to speak Sinhala, Tamil and English fluently and gained popularity among the Tamil community for his political rallies in Northern Province.

On 29 May 2025, Aluthgamage was convicted of corruption by the Colombo High Court and was sentenced to twenty years of rigorous imprisonment.

== Career ==
He entered mainstream politics in 1990 at the age of 25. He served as a people's representative in the Sri Lankan Parliament in 2000, 2001, 2004, 2010 and 2020. He served as the minister of sports from 2010 to 2015.

He was sworn in as the state minister of Power and Energy on 27 November 2019. In February 2020, his position was later changed and modified as state minister of Renewable Energy and Power. In June 2020, he was appointed as the spokesperson for the Sri Lankan government. In June 2020, he completed his 30 years of politics.

Aluthgamage lost his parliamentary seat in 2024. Following the electoral defeat, he announced his retirement from politics.

== Controversies ==
In 2018, he was accused of mishandling the funds during his tenure as sports minister from 2010 to 2015 and was arrested regarding the funds spent on imported cricket and other sports equipments.

=== Fixing allegations ===
On 18 June 2020, in an interview with News First he made a shocking allegation that during his tenure as sports minister the 2011 World Cup final featuring India and Sri Lanka was fixed and further claimed that the 2011 World Cup trophy was sold to India without specifying any evidence. He didn't reveal the details of the cricketers supposedly involved and insisted that he will not disclose the details for the sake of the country with absolute responsibility. His comments drew widespread criticism and global media attention among the cricket fraternity. Former Sri Lankan cricketers Mahela Jayawardene and Kumar Sangakkara who were part of the World Cup final denied the allegations and claimed that the minister was seeking for publicity stunt and political advantage ahead of the upcoming parliamentary election. The Ministry of Sports also launched an investigation to probe the allegations made by Mahindananda.

Ex Sri Lanka cricket team captain Arjuna Ranatunga also made a serious allegation that the 2011 Cricket World Cup Final match between India and Sri Lanka had been fixed. Both Aluthgamage and Ranatunga demanded a probe into the events at the final match. The International Cricket Council stated that it will investigate him based on his match-fixing allegations under ICC anti-corruption unit. On 25 June 2020, however he claimed that his allegations were only suspicion and demanded for an independent investigation regarding the fixing claims. Although Sri Lankan Police conducted a probe, they later dropped it citing lack of evidence. Later International Cricket Council rubbished the match fixing claims made by Ranatunga and Aluthgamage.

== Criminal conviction ==
On 29 May 2025, Aluthgamage was convicted by the Permanent High Court Trial-at-Bar in Colombo and sentenced to twenty years of rigorous imprisonment. The conviction relates to a charge filed in 2019 by the commission to Investigate Allegations of Bribery or Corruption (CIABOC), accusing him of causing a loss of over Rs. 53 million to the government through the irregular procurement of sports equipment for distribution during the 2015 Sri Lankan presidential election.
