= Y. G. Padmasiri =

Sri Lankan politician

Y.G. Padmasiri is a Sri Lankan politician and a member of the Parliament of Sri Lanka. He contested and won the First Provincial Council Election in 1988 and subsequently in 1993, 1999, 2004 and 2008.
