= Ministry of Sugar Industry Development =

Sri Lankan government ministry

Agency overview
- Jurisdiction: Sri Lanka
- Employees: 40
- Annual budget: Rs .091,000 Billion
- Agency executive: Udaya R. Seneviratne, Secretary

The Ministry of Sugar Industry Development is a Sri Lankan government ministry.

== List of ministers ==
Minister of Sugar Industry Development of Sri Lanka
- Ministry of Sugar Industry Development

The Minister of Sugar Industry Development is an appointment in the Cabinet of Sri Lanka.

Parties

Sri Lanka Freedom Party United National Party

Name	Portrait	Party	Tenure	President
Lakshman Senewiratne		United National Party	28 January 2013 – 9 January 2015	Mahinda Rajapaksa

== See also ==
- List of ministries of Sri Lanka
