= Ministry of Public Management Reforms =

Government ministry of Sri Lanka

Agency overview
- Formed: 22 November 2010; 15 years ago
- Jurisdiction: Sri Lanka
- Employees: 138
- Annual budget: Rs .223,450 Billion
- Minister responsible: Navin Dissanayake
- Agency executive: W. M. Bandusena, Secretary
- Website: reformsmin.gov.lk

The Ministry of Public Management Reforms is the Sri Lankan government ministry responsible “to ensure application of modern technologies and practices for results based Public Management through people’s friendly reform initiatives.”

== List of ministers ==
Minister of Public Management Reforms of Sri Lanka
- Incumbent; Navin Dissanayake since 22 November 2010
- Ministry of Public Management Reforms
- Appointer: Mahinda Rajapaksa
- Website: reformsmin.gov.lk

The Minister of Public Management Reforms is an appointment in the Cabinet of Sri Lanka.

Parties

Sri Lanka Freedom Party United National Party

Name	Portrait	Party	Tenure	President
Navin Dissanayake		United National Party	22 November 2010 – Present	Mahinda Rajapaksa

== See also ==
- List of ministries of Sri Lanka
