= Wijaya Dahanayake =

Sri Lankan politician

Wijaya Dahanayake is a Sri Lankan politician. He is the former Deputy Minister of Public Administration and Home Affairs in the Sri Lankan government and a former member of the Parliament of Sri Lanka from Matara. He is a member of the Sri Lanka Freedom Party.

He was educated at Mahinda College, Galle and the Royal College, Colombo. Dahanayake became the SLFP Organizer for the Deniyaya Electorate in Matara District in 1990.
