= Sarath Chandrasiri Muthukumarana =

Sri Lankan politician (1953–2025)

Hon. S.C. Muthukumarana MP

Member of Parliament for Anuradhapura District
- In office 5 March 2024 – 24 September 2024
- Preceded by: Uddika Premarathna
- In office 8 April 2010 – 3 March 2020

Personal details
- Born: 24 February 1953 Dominion of Ceylon (now Sri Lanka)
- Died: 17 December 2025 (aged 72)
- Party: Sri Lanka Podujana Peramuna
- Other political affiliations: Sri Lanka People's Freedom Alliance (2019–2022); Sri Lanka Freedom Party (until 2019); United People's Freedom Alliance (until 2019)

Sarath Chandrasiri Muthukumarana (24 February 1953 – 17 December 2025) was a Sri Lankan politician who was a member of the Parliament of Sri Lanka from Anuradhapura. He belonged to the Sri Lanka Podujana Peramuna, and was previously a member of the Sri Lanka Freedom Party.

Muthukumarana died on 17 December 2025, at the age of 72.
