= Hemal Gunasekara =

Sri Lankan politician

Hon. Hemal Gunasekara MP

Member of Parliament for Matara District
- Incumbent
- Assumed office 2010

Personal details
- Born: 25 December 1959 (age 66) Sri Lanka
- Party: United People's Freedom Alliance
- Education: St Sylvester's College, Kandy

Hemal Gunasekara (born 25 December 1959) is a Sri Lankan politician educated at St Sylvester's College, Kandy and a current Member of Parliament for Matara District.
