= Ministry of Resettlement =

Government ministry of Sri Lanka

Minister of Resettlement, Reconstruction and Hindu Religious Affairs of Sri Lanka
- Incumbent; D. M. Swaminathan since 12 January 2015
- Ministry of Resettlement, Reconstruction and Hindu Religious Affairs
- Appointer: The president on advice of the prime minister
- Website: www.resettlementmin.gov.lk

The minister of resettlement, reconstruction and Hindu religious affairs is an appointment in the Cabinet of Sri Lanka.

== List of resettlement ministers ==
Parties

Sri Lanka Freedom Party United National Party

Name	Portrait	Party	Tenure	President
Gunaratna Weerakoon		Sri Lanka Freedom Party	22 November 2010 – 9 January 2015	Mahinda Rajapaksa
D. M. Swaminathan	D. M. Swaminathan	United National Party	12 January 2015 – Present	Maithripala Sirisena
