= C. B. Ratnayake =

Sri Lankan politician

Hon. C. B. Ratnayake MP
- චන්ද්‍රසිරි බණ්ඩාර රත්නායක சந்திரசிறி பண்டார ரத்நாயக்க

Minister of Plantation Community Infrastructure Development
- In office 2004–2010

Minister of Livestock Development

Minister of Sport
- In office 23 April 2010 – 22 November 2010
- President: Mahinda Rajapaksa
- Prime Minister: D. M. Jayaratne
- Preceded by: Gamini Lokuge
- Succeeded by: Mahindananda Aluthgamage

Member of Parliament for Nuwara Eliya District
- Incumbent
- Assumed office 5 December 2001
- In office 16 August 1994 – 18 August 2000

Personal details
- Born: 21 January 1958 (age 68)
- Party: Sri Lanka Freedom Party
- Spouse: Geetha Ratnayake
- Children: Nuwan Ratnayake, Abheetha Ratnayake, Buddhimali Ratnayake

Ratnayake Mudiyanselage Chandrasiri Bandara Ratnayake (known as C. B. Ratnayake) is a Sri Lankan politician, a Former member of the Parliament of Sri Lanka and a government minister.
