= Nuwara Eliya Electoral District =

Electoral district in Sri Lanka

Nuwara Eliya
- Electoral District for the Parliament of Sri Lanka
- Administrative District: Nuwara Eliya
- Province: Central
- Polling divisions: 4
- Population: 725,280 (2024)
- Electorate: 605,292 (2024)
- Area: 1,741 km^{2} (672 sq mi)

Current Electoral District
- Seats: 8
- MPs: NPP (5) Manjula Suraweera Arachchi; Madhura Senevirathna; R. G. Wijerathna; Anushka Thilakarathna; Krishnan Kaleichelvi SJB (2) Palani Digambaran; Velusami Radhakrishnan UNP (1) Jeewan Thondaman

Nuwara Eliya electoral district is one of the 22 multi-member electoral districts of Sri Lanka created by the 1978 Constitution of Sri Lanka. The district is conterminous with the administrative district of Nuwara Eliya in the Central province. The district currently elects 7 of the 225 members of the Sri Lankan Parliament and had 457,137 registered electors in 2010. The district is Sri Lanka's Electorate Number 06.

== Polling Divisions ==
The Nuwara Eliya Electoral District consists of the following polling divisions:

A: Nuwara Eliya-Maskeliya

B: Kotmale

C: Hanguranketha

D: Walapane

== Presidential Elections ==
=== 1982 Presidential Election ===
Results of the 1st presidential election held on 20 October 1982 for the district:

Candidate	Party	Votes per Polling Division				Postal Votes	Total Votes	%
Candidate	Party	Hanguranketha	Kothmale	Nuwara Eliya- Maskeliya	Walapane	Postal Votes	Total Votes	%
Junius Jayewardene	UNP	20,672	18,684	49,414	18,957	1,290	109,017	63.10%
Hector Kobbekaduwa	SLFP	12,414	12,036	18,543	13,391	709	57,093	33.05%
Rohana Wijeweera	JVP	983	616	1,892	1,023	55	4,569	2.64%
Colvin R. de Silva	LSSP	202	146	632	208	13	1,201	0.70%
Kumar Ponnambalam	ACTC	50	51	380	74	3	558	0.32%
Vasudeva Nanayakkara	NSSP	77	32	145	70	7	331	0.19%
Valid Votes		34,398	31,565	71,006	33,723	2,077	172,769	100.00%
Rejected Votes		368	320	950	397	13	2,048	
Total Polled		34,766	31,885	71,956	34,120	2,090	174,817	
Registered Electors		39,853	37,124	86,487	38,414		201,878	
Turnout		87.24%	85.89%	83.20%	88.82%		86.60%	

=== 1988 Presidential Election ===
Results of the 2nd presidential election held on 19 December 1988 for the district:

Candidate	Party	Votes per Polling Division				Postal Votes	Total Votes	%
Candidate	Party	Hanguranketha	Kothmale	Nuwara Eliya- Maskeliya	Walapane	Postal Votes	Total Votes	%
Ranasinghe Premadasa	UNP	22,748	17,822	52,653	18,099	813	112,135	62.15%
Sirimavo Bandaranaike	SLFP	14,011	13,549	22,209	14,519	619	64,907	35.98%
Ossie Abeygunasekera	SLMP	370	272	2,290	404	35	3,371	1.87%
Valid Votes		37,129	31,643	77,152	33,022	1,467	180,413	100.00%
Rejected Votes		576	401	1,771	530	42	3,320	
Total Polled		37,705	32,044	78,923	33,552	1,509	183,733	
Registered Electors		44,596	39,194	101,765	44,214		229,769	
Turnout		84.55%	81.76%	77.55%	75.89%		79.96%	

=== 1994 Presidential Election ===
Results of the 3rd presidential election held on 9 November 1994 for the district:

Candidate	Party	Votes per Polling Division				Postal Votes	Total Votes	%
Candidate	Party	Hanguranketha	Kothmale	Nuwara Eliya- Maskeliya	Walapane	Postal Votes	Total Votes	%
Chandrika Kumaratunga	PA	22,917	22,034	94,262	26,020	3,696	168,929	57.14%
Srima Dissanayake	UNP	19,609	19,708	53,949	20,955	2,707	116,928	39.55%
Hudson Samarasinghe	Ind 2	350	555	4,897	509	3	6,314	2.14%
Harischandra Wijayatunga	SMBP	162	137	775	226	32	1,332	0.45%
A. J. Ranasinghe	Ind 1	153	140	590	190	10	1,083	0.37%
Nihal Galappaththi	SLPF	96	142	618	178	10	1,044	0.35%
Valid Votes		43,287	42,716	155,091	48,078	6,458	295,630	100.00%
Rejected Votes		1,202	1,651	7,412	1,480	95	11,840	
Total Polled		44,489	44,367	162,503	49,558	6,553	307,470	
Registered Electors		54,001	56,977	212,690	63,000		386,668	
Turnout		82.39%	77.87%	76.40%	78.66%		79.52%	

=== 1999 Presidential Election ===
Results of the 4th presidential election held on 21 December 1999 for the district:

Candidate	Party	Votes per Polling Division				Postal Votes	Total Votes	%
Candidate	Party	Hanguranketha	Kothmale	Nuwara Eliya- Maskeliya	Walapane	Postal Votes	Total Votes	%
Ranil Wickramasinghe	UNP	18,426	20,984	87,653	23,685	2,088	152,836	48.68%
Chandrika Kumaratunga	PA	29,000	22,068	70,497	23,312	2,333	147,210	46.88%
Nandana Gunathilake	JVP	1,572	826	1,897	1,299	285	5,879	1.87%
W. V. M. Ranjith	Ind 2	158	211	1,128	198	3	1,698	0.54%
Rajiva Wijesinha	LPSL	143	164	1,074	186	0	1,567	0.50%
Tennyson Edirisuriya	Ind 1	140	133	672	168	3	1,116	0.36%
Harischandra Wijayatunga	SMBP	131	136	591	142	21	1,021	0.33%
Vasudeva Nanayakkara	LDA	51	67	489	158	47	812	0.26%
Kamal Karunadasa	PLSF	71	76	326	80	2	555	0.18%
Abdul Rasool	SLMP	68	71	322	67	3	531	0.17%
Hudson Samarasinghe	Ind 3	54	52	244	63	0	413	0.13%
Ariyawansha Dissanayaka	DUNF	21	22	102	30	1	176	0.06%
A. W. Premawardhana	PFF	28	13	102	33	0	176	0.06%
Valid Votes		49,863	44,823	165,097	49,421	4,786	313,990	100.00%
Rejected Votes		1,461	1,193	4,885	1,366	92	8,997	
Total Polled		51,324	46,016	169,982	50,787	4,878	322,987	
Registered Electors		58,213	59,333	216,038	64,127		397,711	
Turnout		88.17%	77.56%	78.68%	79.20%		81.21%	

=== 2005 Presidential Election ===
Results of the 5th presidential election held on 17 November 2005 for the district:

Candidate	Party	Votes per Polling Division				Postal Votes	Total Votes	%
Candidate	Party	Hanguranketha	Kothmale	Nuwara Eliya- Maskeliya	Walapane	Postal Votes	Total Votes	%
Ranil Wickramasinghe	UNP	27,061	33,073	156,343	30,852	3,099	250,428	70.37%
Mahinda Rajapaksa	UPFA	20,725	17,645	33,453	23,688	4,039	99,550	27.97%
Siritunga Jayasuriya	USP	277	378	1,631	333	3	2,622	0.74%
A. A. Suraweera	NDF	285	204	689	285	2	1,465	0.41%
Victor Hettigoda	ULPP	58	51	182	74	11	376	0.11%
Chamil Jayaneththi	NLF	57	35	115	78	2	287	0.08%
Anura De Silva	ULF	33	27	125	30	0	215	0.06%
Aruna de Soyza	RPP	46	27	79	50	0	202	0.06%
Wimal Geeganage	SLNF	58	29	67	45	0	199	0.06%
A. K. J. Arachchige	DUA	40	16	73	35	0	164	0.05%
Wije Dias	SEP	18	23	90	15	0	146	0.04%
P. Nelson Perera	SLPF	18	24	74	21	0	137	0.04%
H. S. Dharmadwaja	UNAF	15	16	40	13	0	84	0.02%
Valid Votes		48,691	51,548	192,961	55,519	7,156	355,875	100.00%
Rejected Votes		843	576	2,841	1,003	147	5,410	
Total Polled		49,534	52,124	195,802	56,522	7,303	361,285	
Registered Electors		63,421	65,998	246,062	71,744		447,225	
Turnout		78.10%	78.98%	79.57%	78.78%		80.78%	

=== 2010 Presidential Election ===
Results of the 6th presidential election held on 26 January 2010 for the district:

Candidate	Party	Votes per Polling Division				Postal Votes	Total Votes	%
Candidate	Party	Hanguranketha	Kothmale	Nuwara Eliya- Maskeliya	Walapane	Postal Votes	Total Votes	%
Sarath Fonseka	NDF	16,470	26,727	112,866	21,474	3,067	180,604	52.14%
Mahinda Rajapaksa	UPFA	29,164	24,120	62,604	29,618	6,098	151,604	43.77%
M. C. M. Ismail	DUNF	518	531	2,693	381	11	4,134	1.19%
C. J. Sugathsiri Gamage	UDF	165	210	1,158	196	0	1,729	0.50%
A. A. Suraweera	NDF	312	190	747	315	4	1,568	0.45%
A. S. P. Liyanage	SLLP	127	107	529	169	0	932	0.27%
M. K. Shivajilingam	Ind 5	69	68	447	105	9	698	0.20%
W. V. M. Ranjith	Ind 1	112	94	340	135	6	687	0.20%
Sarath Manamendra	NSH	74	80	441	61	1	657	0.19%
Lal Perera	ONF	53	91	404	84	1	633	0.18%
Siritunga Jayasuriya	USP	57	73	320	69	3	522	0.15%
Ukkubanda Wijekoon	Ind 3	53	44	279	76	0	452	0.13%
Vikramabahu Karunaratne	LF	46	28	204	58	3	339	0.10%
Wije Dias	SEP	21	30	219	40	0	310	0.09%
Sanath Pinnaduwa	NA	31	35	199	29	0	294	0.08%
Aithurus M. Illias	Ind 2	70	35	113	48	2	268	0.08%
Aruna de Soyza	RPP	23	35	108	26	0	192	0.06%
Ven.Battaramulla; Seelarathana Thero	JP	27	17	99	35	3	181	0.05%
M. Mohamed Musthaffa	Ind 4	22	24	114	18	0	178	0.05%
Senaratna de Silva	PNF	17	16	109	26	2	170	0.05%
M. B. Thaminimulla	ACAKO	26	7	73	17	3	126	0.04%
Sarath Kongahage	UNAF	19	8	62	14	1	104	0.03%
Valid Votes		47,476	52,570	184,128	52,994	9,214	346,382	100.00%
Rejected Votes		748	1,057	3,693	875	89	6,462	
Total Polled		48,224	53,627	187,821	53,869	9,303	352,844	
Registered Electors		65,969	70,730	247,069	73,369		457,137	
Turnout		73.10%	75.82%	76.02%	73.42%		77.19%	

=== 2015 Presidential Election ===
Candidate	Party	Votes per Polling Division				Postal Votes	Total Votes	%
Candidate	Party	Hanguranketha	Kothmale	Nuwara Eliya- Maskeliya	Walapane	Postal Votes	Total Votes	%
Valid Votes		0	0	0	0	0	0	0%
Rejected Votes		0	0	0	0	0	0	
Total Polled		0	0	0	0	0	0	
Registered Electors		0	0	0	0		0	
Turnout		0%	0%	0%	0%		0%	

=== 2019 Presidential Election ===
Candidate	Party	Votes per Polling Division				Postal Votes	Total Votes	%
Candidate	Party	Hanguranketha	Kothmale	Nuwara Eliya- Maskeliya	Walapane	Postal Votes	Total Votes	%
Valid Votes		0	0	0	0	0	0	0%
Rejected Votes		0	0	0	0	0	0	
Total Polled		0	0	0	0	0	0	
Registered Electors		0	0	0	0		0	
Turnout		0%	0%	0%	0%		0%	

=== 2024 Presidential Election ===
Candidate	Party	Votes per Polling Division				Postal Votes	Total Votes	%
Candidate	Party	Hanguranketha	Kothmale	Nuwara Eliya- Maskeliya	Walapane	Postal Votes	Total Votes	%
Akmeemana Dayarathna thero	IND1	0	0	0	0	0	0	0%
Abubakar Mohamed Infas	DUA	0	0	0	0	0	0	0%
Siripala Amarasinghe	IND2	0	0	0	0	0	0	0%
K.K. Piyadasa	IND2	0	0	0	0	0	0	0%
Sarath Keerthirathna	IND2	0	0	0	0	0	0	0%
K.K. Kularatna	IND2	0	0	0	0	0	0	0%
Valid Votes		59,165	67,115	260,273	68,407	18,975	473,935	100%
Rejected Votes		1,670	1,809	8,311	2,317	536	14,643	
Total Polled		60,835	68,924	268,584	70,724	19,511	488,578	
Registered Electors		73,426	85,188	340,077	86,874		605,292	
Turnout		82.85%	80.9%	78.98%	81.41%		80.72%	

== Parliamentary General Elections ==
=== 1989 Parliamentary General Election ===
Results of the 9th parliamentary election held on 15 February 1989 for the district:

Party	Votes per Polling Division				Postal Votes	Total Votes	%	Seats
Party	Hanguranketha	Kothmale	Nuwara Eliya- Maskeliya	Walapane	Postal Votes	Total Votes	%	Seats
United National Party (Note: Including the Ceylon Workers' Congress.)	24,140	18,712	44,252	20,699	2,050	109,853	63.34%	4
Sri Lanka Freedom Party	9,890	9,175	15,928	11,236	899	47,128	27.18%	2
Democratic People's Liberation Front (Note: Including the PLOTE.)	101	710	8,718	961	19	10,509	6.06%	0
United Socialist Alliance (Note: Including the CPSL, LSSP, NSSP, SLMP.)	262	260	3,488	155	49	4,214	2.43%	0
Sri Lanka Muslim Congress	49	492	1,078	97	4	1,720	0.99%	0
Valid Votes	34,442	29,349	73,464	33,148	3,021	173,424	100.00%	6
Rejected Votes	2,457	2,439	5,937	2,687	80	13,600		
Total Polled	36,899	31,788	79,401	35,835	3,101	187,024		
Registered Electors	43,844	38,688	100,139	43,624	3,224	229,519		
Turnout	84.16%	82.17%	79.29%	82.15%	96.18%	81.49%		

The following candidates were elected:

Preferential votes
Alliance	Party	Candidate	votes
UNP	UNP	Gamini Dissanayake	73,790
UNP	UNP	Tissa Abeyagoonasekera	35,375
UNP	UNP	Renuka Herath	31,271
UNP	UNP	Wijesundara Bandara Ranatunga	29,067
SLFP	SLFP	Ananda Dassanayake	23,418
SLFP	SLFP	S. B. Dissanayake	18,986

=== 1994 Parliamentary General Election ===
Results of the 10th parliamentary election held on 16 August 1994 for the district:

Party	Votes per Polling Division				Postal Votes	Total Votes	%	Seats
Party	Hanguranketha	Kothmale	Nuwara Eliya- Maskeliya	Walapane	Postal Votes	Total Votes	%	Seats
United National Party (Note: Including the Ceylon Workers' Congress.)	24,783	26,542	94,893	26,534	2,726	175,478	58.12%	5
People's Alliance (Note: Including the SLFP et al..)	17,904	16,112	39,476	21,453	2,713	97,658	32.35%	2
Independent Group (Note: Including UCPF.)	68	1,610	24,248	1,189	259	27,374	9.07%	1
Sri Lanka Progressive Front (Note: Including the JVP.)	130	194	453	107	44	928	0.31%	0
Mahajana Eksath Peramuna	56	90	221	80	33	480	0.16%	0
Valid Votes	42,941	44,548	159,291	49,363	5,775	301,918	100.00%	8
Rejected Votes	2,526	2,607	13,368	2,997	94	21,592		
Total Polled	45,467	47,155	172,659	52,360	5,869	323,510		
Registered Electors	54,001	56,977	212,690	63,000		386,668		
Turnout	84.20%	82.76%	81.18%	83.11%		83.67%		

The following candidates were elected:

Preferential votes
Alliance	Party	Candidate	votes
UNP	CWC	Muthu Sivalingam	85,490
UNP	CWC	Suppaiah Sathasivam	83,368
UNP	CWC	Arumugam Thondaman	75,297
UNP	UNP	Renuka Herath	49,473
UNP	UNP	Tissa Abeyagoonasekera	40,513
PA	SLFP	S. B. Dissanayake	38,372
PA	SLFP	C. B. Rathnayake	38,092
IG	UCPF	Periyasamy Chandrasekaran	23,453

=== 2000 Parliamentary General Election ===
Results of the 11th parliamentary election held on 10 October 2000 for the district:

Party	Votes per Polling Division				Postal Votes	Total Votes	%	Seats
Party	Hanguranketha	Kothmale	Nuwara Eliya- Maskeliya	Walapane	Postal Votes	Total Votes	%	Seats
People's Alliance (Note: Including the SLFP, CWC et al..)	32,859	21,623	75,788	24,390	3,358	158,018	52.53%	4
United National Party (Note: Including the Up-Country People's Front.)	10,470	20,283	71,854	21,144	2,735	126,486	42.05%	3
Janatha Vimukthi Peramuna	1,386	950	2,311	1,290	362	6,299	2.09%	0
National Union of Workers	42	63	4,506	55	5	4,671	1.55%	0
Citizen's Front	72	123	2,049	161	40	2,445	0.81%	0
Sinhala Heritage	104	96	823	84	54	1,161	0.39%	0
Left & Democratic Alliance	4	9	162	107	12	294	0.10%	0
Liberal Party	15	32	210	33	4	294	0.10%	0
Democratic United National Front	24	35	129	35	1	224	0.07%	0
Independent Group 9	10	15	96	21	0	142	0.05%	0
Independent Group 4	4	3	96	6	1	110	0.04%	0
Sinhalaye Mahasammatha; Bhoomiputra Pakshaya	12	10	67	8	11	108	0.04%	0
Independent Group 3	10	7	42	34	0	93	0.03%	0
National Development Front	22	6	27	11	0	66	0.02%	0
Sri Lanka Muslim Party	5	11	45	5	0	66	0.02%	0
Independent Group 1	2	6	34	16	0	58	0.02%	0
Independent Group 7	10	3	37	7	0	57	0.02%	0
Independent Group 8	7	6	26	11	0	50	0.02%	0
Independent Group 5	4	5	27	8	0	44	0.01%	0
Independent Group 6	1	3	29	7	0	40	0.01%	0
People's Freedom Front	2	1	26	4	0	33	0.01%	0
Ruhunu People's Party	3	1	14	7	0	25	0.01%	0
Independent Group 2	0	3	11	8	0	22	0.01%	0
Valid Votes	45,068	43,294	158,409	47,452	6,583	300,806	100.00%	7
Rejected Votes	4,180	4,924	19,785	6,114	146	35,149		
Total Polled	49,248	48,218	178,194	53,566	6,729	335,955		
Registered Electors	58,854	60,202	220,934	65,424		405,414		
Turnout	83.68%	80.09%	80.65%	81.88%		82.87%		

The following candidates were elected:

Preferential votes
Alliance	Party	Candidate	votes
PA	SLFP	S. B. Dissanayake	78,903
PA	CWC	Arumugan Thondaman	61,779
PA	CWC	Muthu Sivalingam	55,673
UNP	UNP	Navin Dissanayake	55,587
PA	CWC	S. Jegadhiswaran	50,375
UNP	UCPF	Periyasamy Chandrasekaran	54,681
UNP	UNP	Suppaiah Sathasivam	47,472

=== 2001 Parliamentary General Election ===
Results of the 12th parliamentary election held on 5 December 2001 for the district:

Party	Votes per Polling Division				Postal Votes	Total Votes	%	Seats
Party	Hanguranketha	Kothmale	Nuwara Eliya- Maskeliya	Walapane	Postal Votes	Total Votes	%	Seats
United National Front (Note: Including the UNP, SLMC, CWC, WPF, UCPF.)	25,631	29,549	130,633	26,431	2,913	215,157	68.28%	5
People's Alliance (Note: Including the SLFP et al.)	13,618	14,421	28,734	18,582	2,378	77,733	24.67%	2
Janatha Vimukthi Peramuna	2,502	1,508	4,227	2,184	659	11,080	3.52%	0
National Democratic Party	28	310	6,206	46	10	6,600	2.09%	0
New Left Front (Note: Including the NSSP et al.)	242	243	848	342	12	1,687	0.54%	0
United Socialist Party	125	153	825	154	5	1,262	0.40%	0
Sinhala Heritage	60	66	423	62	31	642	0.20%	0
Democratic Left Front	23	22	122	199	7	373	0.12%	0
Independent Group 6	23	17	98	39	2	179	0.06%	0
National Development Front	23	23	60	10	1	117	0.04%	0
Independent Group 1	17	11	13	19	1	61	0.02%	0
Independent Group 5	13	3	21	8	0	45	0.01%	0
People's Freedom Front	3		25	8	1	37	0.01%	0
Independent Group 4	2	2	26	6	0	36	0.01%	0
Independent Group 3	4	2	18	5	0	29	0.01%	0
Independent Group 2	3	4	10	8	1	26	0.01%	0
Sri Lanka National Front	2	2	8	12	0	24	0.01%	0
Sri Lanka Progressive Front	2	1	8	0	0	11	0.00%	0
Valid Votes	42,321	46,337	172,305	48,115	6,021	315,099	100.00%	7
Rejected Votes	5,211	3,638	14,103	5,335	86	28,373		
Total Polled	47,532	49,975	186,408	53,450	6,107	343,472		
Registered Electors	60,044	62,131	228,317	66,671		417,163		
Turnout	79.16%	80.43%	81.64%	80.17%		82.34%		

The following candidates were elected:

Preferential votes
Alliance	Party	Candidate	votes
UNF	CWC	Arumugam Thondaman	121,542
UNF	UCPF	Periyasamy Chandrasekaran	121,421
UNF	CWC	Muthu Sivalingam	107,338
UNF	UNP	Navin Dissanayake	74,894
UNF	UNP	K. K. Piyadasa	54,206
PA	SLFP	C. B. Rathnayake	49,673
PA	SLFP	Shantha Kumara Dassanayake	35,504

=== 2004 Parliamentary General Election ===
Results of the 13th parliamentary election held on 2 April 2004 for the district:

Party	Votes per Polling Division				Postal Votes	Total Votes	%	Seats
Party	Hanguranketha	Kothmale	Nuwara Eliya- Maskeliya	Walapane	Postal Votes	Total Votes	%	Seats
United National Front (Note: Including the UNP, SLMC, CWC, WPF.)	25,313	25,390	100,350	22,768	3,150	176,971	54.02%	4
United People's Freedom; Alliance (Note: Including the SLFP, JVP et al.)	16,962	15,964	25,989	20,607	3,423	82,945	25.32%	2
Up-Country People's Front	574	4,182	41,563	3,170	239	49,728	15.18%	1
Ceylon Democratic Unity; Alliance	88	1,563	7,331	1,697	57	10,736	3.28%	0
Jathika Hela Urumaya	630	593	2,617	395	219	4,454	1.36%	0
United Socialist Party	73	144	1,019	188	2	1,426	0.44%	0
National Development Front	77	27	372	51	5	532	0.16%	0
Liberal Party	4	25	58	99	2	188	0.06%	0
New Left Front (Note: NSSP et al.)	16	11	113	42	5	187	0.06%	0
Independent Group 4	15	13	54	13	0	95	0.03%	0
Ruhuna People's Party	3	1	72	3	0	79	0.02%	0
Independent Group 3	11	9	36	16	0	72	0.02%	0
Sinhalaye Mahasammatha; Bhoomiputra Pakshaya	9	8	23	11	2	53	0.02%	0
Independent Group 1	9	5	19	11	1	45	0.01%	0
Independent Group 2	1	3	27	6	1	38	0.01%	0
Sri Lanka National Front	4	3	11	7	1	26	0.01%	0
Swarajya Party	6	1	12	4	0	23	0.01%	0
Sri Lanka Progressive Front	2	0	6	3	0	11	0.00%	0
Valid Votes	43,797	47,942	179,672	49,091	7,107	327,609	100.00%	7
Rejected Votes	3,732	2,896	13,594	4,028	163	24,413		
Total Polled	47,529	50,838	193,266	53,119	7,270	352,022		
Registered Electors	61,868	65,044	239,511	69,813		436,236		
Turnout	76.82%	78.16%	80.69%	76.09%		80.70%		

The following candidates were elected:

Preferential votes
Alliance	Party	Candidate	votes
UNF	CWC	Arumugam Thondaman	99,783
UNF	CWC	Muthu Sivalingam	85,708
UNF	CWC	S. Jegadhiswaran	81,386
UNF	UNP	S. B. Dissanayake (Note: S. B. Dissanayake (UNF-UNP) vacated his seat on 7 December 2004 after being jailed by the Sri Lankan Supreme Court for contempt of court. His replacement Renuka Herath (UNF-UNP) was sworn in on 30 January 2006.)	71,723
UPFA	SLFP	C. B. Rathnayake	55,284
UPFA	JVP	N. D. N. P. Jayasinghe	44,229
UCPF	UCPF	Periyasamy Chandrasekaran (Note: Periyasamy Chandrasekaran (UCPF) died on 1 January 2010. His replacement Santhanam Arulsamy (UCPF) was sworn in on 5 February 2010.)	42,582

=== 2010 Parliamentary General Election ===
Results of the 14th parliamentary election held on 8 April 2010 for the district:

Party	Votes per Polling Division				Postal Votes	Total Votes	%	Seats
Party	Hanguranketha	Kothmale	Nuwara Eliya- Maskeliya	Walapane	Postal Votes	Total Votes	%	Seats
United People's Freedom; Alliance (Note: Including CWC, SLFP et al.)	18,866	24,790	72,766	26,017	6,672	149,111	56.01%	5
United National Front (Note: Including UNP, SLMC, DPF, SLFP(P).)	10,362	13,553	59,339	11,551	2,080	96,885	36.39%	2
Up-Country People's Front	236	1,120	10,912	881	40	13,189	4.95%	0
Democratic National Alliance (Note: Including JVP et al.)	993	700	1,389	508	394	3,984	1.50%	0
Independent Group 1	16	48	1,068	133	15	1,280	0.48%	0
United Socialist Party	21	28	230	24	0	303	0.11%	0
Independent Group 5	6	8	102	106	13	235	0.09%	0
Sinhalaye Mahasammatha; Bhoomiputra Pakshaya	166	1	13	28	17	225	0.08%	0
United National Alternative Front	20	24	81	25	7	157	0.06%	0
Independent Group 14	15	12	65	25	0	117	0.04%	0
National Development Front	16	11	69	18	3	117	0.04%	0
United Democratic Front	7	8	37	9	2	63	0.02%	0
Independent Group 10	6	13	35	6	2	62	0.02%	0
Independent Group 9	6	3	38	3	1	51	0.02%	0
Independent Group 11	15	13	13	7	0	48	0.02%	0
Independent Group 13	8	6	22	8	1	45	0.02%	0
Socialist Equality Party	1	3	38	2	1	45	0.02%	0
United Lanka Great Council	6	3	20	12	0	41	0.02%	0
Janasetha Peramuna	1	10	24	3	1	39	0.01%	0
Independent Group 6	3	9	16	6	1	35	0.01%	0
Independent Group 3	15	2	8	4	4	33	0.01%	0
Patriotic National Front	5	6	14	7	0	32	0.01%	0
Independent Group 2	3	1	11	13	1	29	0.01%	0
Left Liberation Front	2	4	12	5	0	23	0.01%	0
Sri Lanka National Front	5	1	9	3	2	20	0.01%	0
Independent Group 4	3	0	9	4	1	17	0.01%	0
Independent Group 7	3	1	8	5	0	17	0.01%	0
Independent Group 12	4	3	6	1	0	14	0.01%	0
Independent Group 8	2	2	7	1	0	12	0.00%	0
Sri Lanka Labour Party	1	1	1	1	1	5	0.00%	0
Valid Votes	30,813	40,384	146,362	39,416	9,259	266,234	100.00%	7
Rejected Votes	5,146	5,327	19,969	6,424	370	37,236		
Total Polled	35,959	45,711	166,331	45,840	9,629	303,470		
Registered Electors	65,969	70,730	247,069	73,369		457,137		
Turnout	54.51%	64.63%	67.32%	62.48%		66.38%		

The following candidates were elected:

Preferential votes
Alliance	Party	Candidate	votes
UPFA	CWC	Arumugam Thondaman	60,997
UPFA	CWC	Velusami Radhakrishnan	54,083
UPFA	CWC	Perumal Rajadurai	49,228
UPFA	UNP	Navin Dissanayake	43,514
UPFA	SLFP	C. B. Rathnayake	41,345
UNF	NUW	Palani Digambaran (Note: The National Union of Workers left the United National Front alliance on 22 April 2010 after a dispute over National List seats. Palani Digambaran (UNF-NUW), their sole MP, is to function as an independent MP.)	39,490
UNF	CF	Sri Ranga Jeyaratnam	33,948

=== 2015 Parliamentary General Election ===
Results of the 15th parliamentary election held on 17 August 2015 for the district:

Party	Votes per Polling Division				Postal Votes	Total Votes	%	Seats
Party	Hanguranketha	Kothmale	Nuwara Eliya- Maskeliya	Walapane	Postal Votes	Total Votes	%	Seats
	0	0	0	0	0	0	0.00%	0
Valid Votes	0'	0	0	0	0	0	100.00%	
Rejected Votes	0	0	0	0	0	0		
Total Polled	0	0	0	0	0	0		
Registered Electors	0	0	0	0	0	0		
Turnout	%	%	%	%		%		

=== 2020 Parliamentary General Election ===
Results of the 16th parliamentary election held on 5 August 2020 for the district:

Party	Votes per Polling Division				Postal Votes	Total Votes	%	Seats
Party	Hanguranketha	Kothmale	Nuwara Eliya- Maskeliya	Walapane	Postal Votes	Total Votes	%	Seats
	0	0	0	0	0	0	0.00%	0
Valid Votes	0'	0	0	0	0	0	100.00%	
Rejected Votes	0	0	0	0	0	0		
Total Polled	0	0	0	0	0	0		
Registered Electors	0	0	0	0	0	0		
Turnout	%	%	%	%		%		

=== 2024 Parliamentary General Election ===
Results of the 17th parliamentary election held on 14 November 2024 for the district:

Party	Votes per Polling Division				Postal Votes	Total Votes	%	Seats
Party	Hanguranketha	Kothmale	Nuwara Eliya- Maskeliya	Walapane	Postal Votes	Total Votes	%	Seats
	0	0	0	0	0	0	0.00%	0
Valid Votes	0'	0	0	0	0	0	100.00%	
Rejected Votes	0	0	0	0	0	0		
Total Polled	0	0	0	0	0	0		
Registered Electors	0	0	0	0	0	0		
Turnout	%	%	%	%		%		

== Provincial Council Elections ==
=== 1988 provincial council election ===
Results of the 1st Central provincial council election held on 2 June 1988

Party	Total Votes	%	Seats
United National Party	98,863	70.43%	12
United Socialist Alliance (Note: Including the CPSL, LSSP, NSSP & SLMP)	38,312	27.3%	5
Sri Lanka Muslim Congress	3,187	2.27%	0
Valid Votes	140,362	100.00%	17

=== 1993 provincial council election ===
Results of the 2nd Central provincial council election held on 17 May 1993:

Party	Votes	%	Seats
United National Party	150,936	59.18%	10
People's Alliance (Note: Including the SLFP et al.)	47,823	18.75%	3
Democratic United National Front	29,183	11.44%	2
Independent Group 2	16,075	6.3%	1
National Union of Workers	7,749	3.04%	1
Nava Sama Samaja Party	1,376	0.54%	0
Democratic Workers Congress	1,074	0.42%	0
Independent Group 1	847	0.33%	0
Valid Votes	255,063	100.00%	17

=== 1999 Provincial Council Election ===
Results of the 3rd Central provincial council election held on 6 April 1999 for the district:

Party	Votes per Polling Division				Postal Votes	Total Votes	%	Seats
Party	Hanguranketha	Kothmale	Nuwara Eliya- Maskeliya	Walapane	Postal Votes	Total Votes	%	Seats
United National Party	14,299	14,865	43,587	14,129	1,140	88,020	32.41%	6
People's Alliance (Note: Including the SLFP & SLMC.)	22,571	14,389	22,265	18,834	1,205	79,264	29.18%	5
National Union of Workers (Note: Including CWC & DWC.)	1,494	8,048	55,788	4,035	96	69,441	25.57%	4
Up-Country People's Front	321	1,793	18,904	1,800	78	22,896	8.43%	2
Janatha Vimukthi Peramuna	1,057	843	1,756	1,118	135	4,909	1.81%	0
New Left Front (Note: Including the NSSP et al.)	489	264	1,390	1,366	12	3,541	1.3%	0
Independent Group 2	47	105	1,188	700	11	2,031	0.75%	0
Mahajana Eksath Peramuna	48	72	515	54	22	811	0.30%	0
Independent Group 1	6	43	362	50	1	462	0.17%	0
Independent Group 3	37	19	130	51	1	238	0.09%	0
Valid Votes	40,369	40,461	145,945	42,137	2,701	271,613	100.00%	17
Rejected Votes	4,617	3,906	17,282	4,962	86	30,853	10.23%	
Total Polled	44,986	44,367	163,227	47,089	2,787	302,466	77.24%	
Registered Electors	57,421	58,603	212,585	82,998		391,585		

The following candidates were elected:

Preferential votes
Party	Candidate	votes
NUW	Velusami Radhakrishnan	33,775
UNP	K. K. Piyadasa	33,771
PA	Saliaya Bandara Dissanayake	26,935
NUW	Suppiah Kandasami	22,873
UNP	Piyasiri Gawarammana	21,429
PA	R. M. S. B. Ratnayake	19,080
UNP	Vadivel Puttirasigamany	17,904
UNP	Abeyratne Bandara	17,225
NUW	Muthuasami Nadarajahpillai	15,882
NUW	Sicken Vellayan	14,493
PA	Shantha Kumara Dasanayake	14,167
UNP	Mahinda Bandara Delpitiya	12,805
PA	Sheela Yapa	12,687
UNP	Wimal Sisira Bandara	12,666
PA	Jayaratna Dissanayake	11,070
UCPF	Murugan Sivalingam	7,780
UCPF	G. Rajagulendra	5,932

=== 2004 Provincial Council Election ===
Results of the 4th Central provincial council election held on 10 July 2004 for the district:

Party	Votes per Polling Division				Postal Votes	Total Votes	%	Seats
Party	Hanguranketha	Kothmale	Nuwara Eliya- Maskeliya	Walapane	Postal Votes	Total Votes	%	Seats
United National Party	19,062	17,145	83,450	17,571	1,344	138,572	50.88%	8
United People's Freedom; Alliance (Note: Including the SLFP, JVP.)	17,486	15,653	32,049	21,938	2,066	89,192	32.75%	6
Up-Country People's Front	482	4,909	29,365	2,147	36	36,939	13.56%	2
United Socialist Party	252	410	2,860	369	5	3,896	1.43%	0
Independent Group 2	56	20	811	1,032	16	1,935	0.71%	0
Liberal Party	6	124	546	179	5	860	0.32%	0
National Development Front	102	39	285	94	1	521	0.19%	0
Independent Group 3	29	18	78	20	1	146	0.05%	0
National Democratic Party	8	13	75	13	0	109	0.04%	0
Sinhalaye Mahasammatha; Bhoomiputra Pakshaya	6	8	48	9	5	76	0.03%	0
Independent Group 1	4	2	27	14	3	50	0.02%	0
Sri Lanka Progressive Front	10	3	12	5	1	31	0.01%	0
Valid Votes	37,503	38,344	149,606	43,391	3,483	272,327	100.00%	16
Rejected Votes	3,077	2,935	13,449	3,774	140	23,375		
Total Polled	40,580	41,279	163,055	47,165	3,623	295,702		
Registered Electors	61,868	65,054	239,513	69,813		436,248		
Turnout	65.59%	63.45%	68.08%	67.56%		67.78%		

The following candidates were elected:

Preferential votes
Party	Candidate	votes
UNP	Velusami Radhakrishnan	44,525
UNP	S. B. Dissanayake	33,869
UNP	K. P. Govindaraja	31,501
UNP	Muthuasami Nadarajahpillai	28,008
UPFA	R. M. S. B. Rathnayaka	27,997
UNP	Sicken Vellayan	23,252
UNP	Sivaraja Anushshaya	22,073
UNP	Sadayan Balachandran	21,713
UNP	Renuka Herath	21,485
UCPF	Santhanam Arulsamy	18,964
UCPF	Palani Digambaran	18,387
UPFA	Jayarathna Dissanayake	17,894
UPFA	Nimal Piyatissa	17,111
UPFA	Aquelas De Silva	16,683
UPFA	A. W. G. Ranasinghe	16,262
UPFA	Chinthaka Saminda Kularathna	12,443

=== 2009 Provincial Council Election ===
Results of the 5th Central provincial council election held on 14 February 2009 for the district:

Party	Votes per Polling Division				Postal Votes	Total Votes	%	Seats
Party	Hanguranketha	Kothmale	Nuwara Eliya- Maskeliya	Walapane	Postal Votes	Total Votes	%	Seats
United People's Freedom; Alliance (Note: Including the SLFP, CWC.)	24,639	24,789	69,323	23,972	3,695	146,418	51.77%	9
United National Party	13,740	17,933	79,153	16,260	1,203	128,289	45.36%	7
Janatha Vimukthi Peramuna	374	656	1,453	457	99	3,039	1.07%	0
Independent Group 10	21	333	1,640	15	34	2,043	0.72%	0
United Socialist Party	28	84	500	73	3	688	0.24%	0
National Development Front	47	29	458	47	5	586	0.21%	0
Independent Group 4	2	12	173	231	13	431	0.15%	0
Ruhunu People's Party	10	68	228	97	1	404	0.14%	0
United Lanka People's Party	26	29	143	42	1	241	0.09%	0
Left Front (Note: NSSP et al.)	4	4	21	87	2	118	0.04%	0
Sinhalaye Mahasammatha; Bhoomiputra Pakshaya	3	10	89	3	3	108	0.04%	0
Socialist Equality Party	1	5	82	7	3	98	0.03%	0
Independent Group 9	10	8	38	8	0	64	0.02%	0
Independent Group 5	3	5	29	7	0	44	0.02%	0
United Lanka Great Council	10	2	24	6	1	43	0.02%	0
Independent Group 6	4	3	21	5	0	33	0.01%	0
Independent Group 1	6	5	15	3	1	30	0.01%	0
Independent Group 8	7	3	11	7	0	28	0.01%	0
Independent Group 7	3	2	17	5	0	27	0.01%	0
Independent Group 3	4	1	13	4	0	22	0.01%	0
Independent Group 2	0	1	15	3	0	19	0.01%	0
National People's Party	1	3	13	1	0	18	0.01%	0
Liberal Party	3	2	9	3	0	17	0.01%	0
Patriotic National Front	1	2	5	3	0	11	0.00%	0
Valid Votes	38,947	43,989	153,473	41,346	5,064	282,819	100.00%	16
Rejected Votes	3,898	3,462	15,099	4,289	99	26,847		
Total Polled	42,845	47,451	168,572	45,635	5,163	309,666		
Registered Electors	65,209	68,967	245,527	72,692		452,395		
Turnout	65.70%	68.80%	68.66%	62.78%		68.45%		

The following candidates were elected:

Preferential votes
Party	Candidate	votes
UNP	Palani Digambaran	45,229
UPFA	S. B. Dissanayake	39,005
UNP	Prakash Ganeshan	38,362
UNP	M. Udayakumar	32,409
UPFA	R. M. S. B. Rathnayaka	30,114
UPFA	Shantha Kumara Dasanayake	30,006
UPFA	M. Rameshwaran	21,544
UNP	Jayalath Bandara	21,350
UNP	K. K. Piyadasa	20,902
UNP	Suppaiah Sathasivam	20,462
UPFA	Nimal Piyatissa	19,961
UPFA	Ramasami Muththaiah	18,990
UPFA	Jayarathna Dissanayake	18,897
UPFA	Velusami Radhakrishnan	18,513
UPFA	Wimali Karunarathne	17,982
UNP	Sri Kanapathi Kanagaraja	15,547

=== 2013 provincial council election ===
Results of the 6th provincial council election held on 21 September 2013 for the district:

Party	Votes per Polling Division				Postal Votes	Total Votes	%	Seats
Party	Hanguranketha	Kothmale	Nuwara Eliya- Maskeliya	Walapane	Postal Votes	Total Votes	%	Seats
United People's Freedom; Alliance (Note: Including SLFP et al.)	24,276	33,520	129,672	32,436	5,403	225,307	68.87%	12
United National Party	13,200	9,794	31,446	11,184	1,639	67,263	20.56%	4
Up-Country People's Front	568	2,891	17,980	1,877	139	23,455	7.17%	1
Democratic Party	423	532	1,585	472	373	3,385	1.03%	0
Janatha Vimukthi Peramuna	415	455	1,077	231	132	2,310	0.71%	0
Independent Group 2	10	38	1,086	39	12	1,185	0.36%	0
Eelavar Democratic Front	90	154	666	182	4	1,096	0.34%	0
Socialist Alliance	11	36	639	33	7	726	0.22%	0
Independent Group 5	25	89	500	32	1	647	0.2%	0
United Socialist Party	52	52	345	73	1	523	0.16%	0
Independent Group 5	21	32	343	29	4	429	0.13%	0
Independent Group 6	3	4	99	44	1	151	0.05%	0
United Lanka People's Party	28	16	71	21	2	138	0.04%	0
Patriotic National Front	6	12	96	10	5	129	0.04%	0
Independent Group 7	7	14	58	11	0	90	0.03%	0
Independent Group 8	14	13	37	10	1	75	0.02%	0
United Lanka Great Council	9	11	30	13	0	63	0.02%	0
Independent Group 3	12	4	24	2	1	43	0.01%	0
Jana Setha Peramuna	2	17	11	6	1	37	0.01%	0
Independent Group 1	3	4	16	9	0	32	0.01%	0
Independent Group 4	4	2	15	1	0	22	0.01%	0
Sri Lanka Labour Party	2	1	15	3	0	21	0.01%	0
Ruhunu People's Party	3	1	10	1	1	16	0.00%	0
Valid Votes	39,184	47,692	185,821	46,719	7,727	327,143	100.00%	17
Rejected Votes	3,503	4,112	15,537	4,196	329	27,677	7.8%	
Total Polled	42,687	51,804	201,358	50,915	8,056	354,820		
Registered Electors	69,128	75,297	284,684	78,584		507,693		

The following candidates were elected:

Preferential votes
Party	Candidate	votes
UPFA	Ramasamy Muththaiah	50,600
UPFA	Ram Kanapathy Kanagaraj	48,825
UPFA	Philip Kumar	46,912
UPFA	M. Rameshwaran	44,695
UPFA	M. Udayakumar	43,543
UPFA	Palani Shakthivel	39,813
UPFA	R. M. S. B. Rathnayaka	29,511
UPFA	Siridaran Somasundaram	29,281
UPFA	Singaram Ponnaiah	28,834
UPFA	Shantha Kumara Dasanayake	28,632
UPFA	Sivaguru Saraswathy	27,451
UPFA	Nimal Piyatissa	24,109
UNP	K. K. Piyadasa	21,972
UNP	Jayalath Bandara	16,556
UNP	Renuka Herath	15,507
UCPF	Radhakrishnan Rajaram	12,237
UNP	Suppiah Sathasivam	10,002
