= M. Udayakumar =

Sri Lankan politician

Hon. M. Udayakumar MP
- பழனி எலிலன் மயில்வாகனம் உதயகுமார் පලනි එලිලන් මයිල්වාගනම් උදයකුමාර්

Member of the Parliament of Sri Lanka
- Incumbent
- Assumed office 2020
- Constituency: Nuwara Eliya District

Member of the Central Provincial Council
- In office 2009–2018
- Constituency: Nuwara Eliya District

Personal details
- Born: 28 September 1967 (age 58)
- Party: National Union of Workers
- Other political affiliations: Tamil Progressive Alliance

Palani Elilan Mylvaganam Udayakumar (born 28 September 1967) is a Sri Lankan politician, former provincial councillor and Member of Parliament.

Udayakumar was born on 28 September 1967. He has a degree in management. He was previously deputy leader of the Ceylon Workers' Congress but is currently a member of the National Union of Workers.

Udayakumar was a member of the Central Provincial Council. He contested the 2020 parliamentary election as a Samagi Jana Balawegaya electoral alliance candidate in Nuwara Eliya District and was elected to the Parliament of Sri Lanka.

Electoral history of M. Udayakumar
Election	Constituency	Party	Alliance	Votes	Result
2009 provincial	Nuwara Eliya District		United National Party	32,409	Elected
2013 provincial	Nuwara Eliya District	Ceylon Workers' Congress	United People's Freedom Alliance	43,543	Elected
2020 parliamentary	Nuwara Eliya District	National Union of Workers	Samagi Jana Balawegaya	68,119	Elected
