= Nimal =

Nimal may refer to:

- Nimal Bandara, Sri Lankan politician
- Nimal Gamini Amaratunga, Sri Lankan judge
- Nimal Gunaratne, Sri Lankan air force officer
- Nimal Mendis, Sri Lankan politician
- Nimal Piyatissa (born 1968), Sri Lankan politician
- Nimal Rajapakshe, Sri Lankan academic
- Nimal Senanayake, Sri Lankan neurologist, physician
- Nimal Siripala de Silva, Sri Lankan politician
- Nimal Wijesinghe, Sri Lankan politician
- Ahmed Nimal (1963–2026), Maldivian actor, director, editor, writer and producer
- Baboo Nimal, Indian field hockey player
- Hiranna M. Nimal, Indian field hockey player
- S. H. Nimal Kumar, Sri Lankan Red Cross secretary
