= Perumal Rajadurai =

Sri Lankan politician and attorney

Hon. Perumal Rajadurai MP

Member of Parliament for Nuwara Eliya District
- In office 2010–2015

Personal details
- Born: 26 March 1967 (age 59)
- Party: United National Party
- Other political affiliations: United National Front for Good Governance
- Occupation: Attorney-at-law

Sundaram Perumal Rajadurai (born 26 March 1967) is a Sri Lankan attorney-at-law, politician and former member of parliament.

== Early life and family ==
Rajadurai was born on 26 March 1967. His family were estate workers at the Rockland estate in Udapussellawa. He studied at Suriyagaha Pathana Tamil Vidyalayam and Ragala Tamil Vidyalayam.

== Career ==
Rajadurai is an attorney-at-law, acting magistrate and president of the Nuwara Eliya Rotary Club.

Rajadurai contested the 2010 parliamentary election as one of the United People's Freedom Alliance's (UPFA) candidates in Nuwara Eliya District. He was elected and entered Parliament. On 8 August 2013 Rajadurai left the Ceylon Workers' Congress to sit as an independent MP supporting UPFA. He joined the National Union of Workers as its deputy leader on 18 August 2013.

Rajadurai resigned from the UPFA on 21 November 2014 to support common opposition candidate Maithripala Sirisena at the presidential election. He joined the United National Party (UNP) on 25 November 2014. He was appointed the UNP organizer for Nuwara Eliya. He failed to get re-elected at the 2015 parliamentary election after coming eighth amongst the United National Front for Good Governance candidates.

== Electoral history ==
Electoral history of Perumal Rajadurai
Election	Constituency	Party	Votes	Result
2010 parliamentary	Nuwara Eliya District	UPFA	49,228	Elected
2015 parliamentary	Nuwara Eliya District	UNFGG	28,992	Not elected
