= Santhanam Arulsamy =

Sri Lankan politician (1959–2019)

Hon. Santhanam Arullsamy Deshamanya and Deshakeerthi
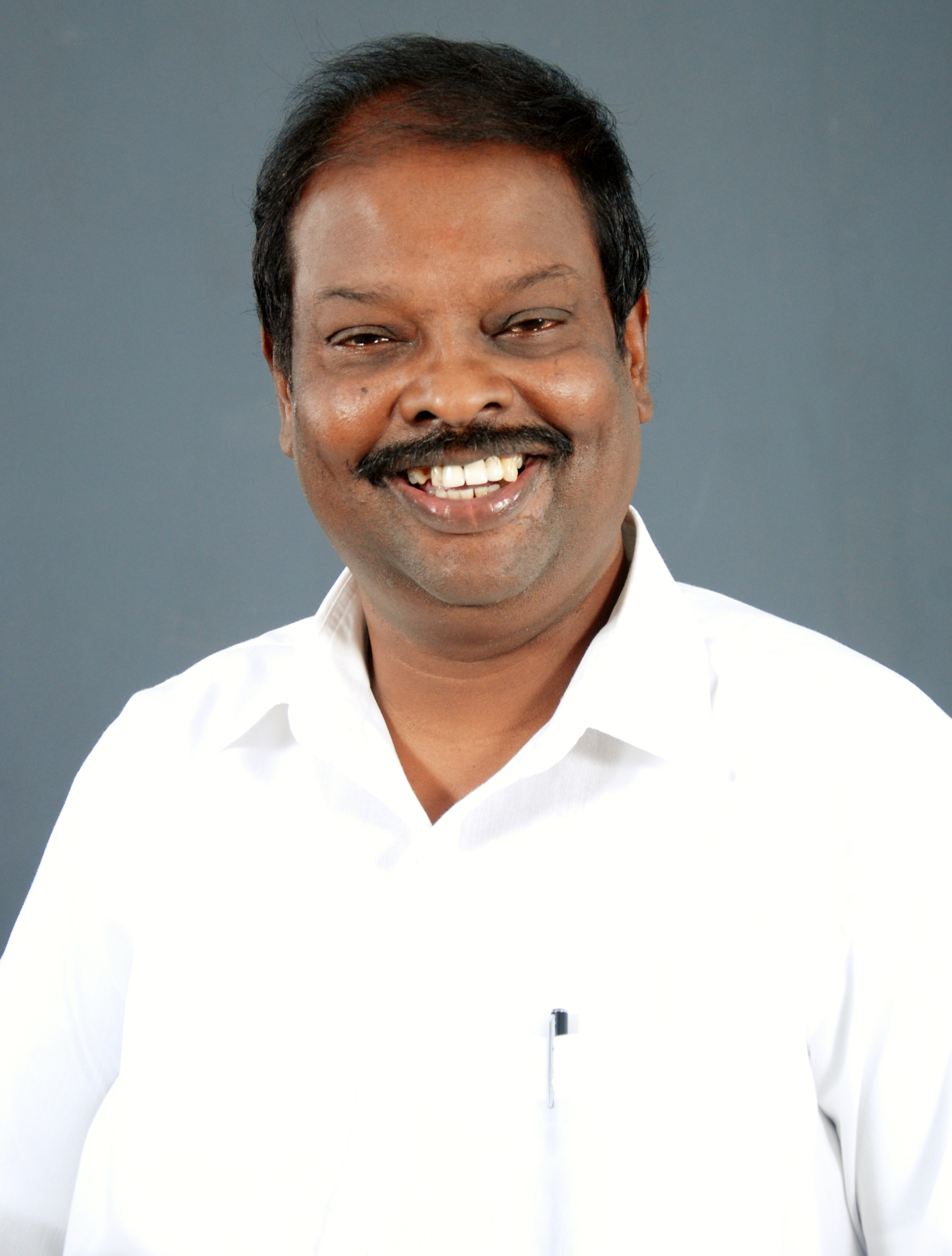

Member of Parliament for Nuwara Eliya
- In office 2010–2010

Personal details
- Born: 21 September 1959 Nuwara Eliya, Sri Lanka
- Died: 6 January 2019 (aged 59) Hatton, Sri Lanka
- Party: Ceylon Workers Congress
- Other political affiliations: Up-Country People's Front
- Occupation: Trade Unionist

Santhanam Arulsamy சந்தானம் அருள்சாமி (21 September 1959 – 6 January 2019) was a Sri Lankan politician and trade unionist. He was the Minister of Education and Hindu Cultural Affairs for the Central province in 2004. He was nominated to Sri Lanka Parliament to replace Periyasamy Chandrasekaran who had died from Nuwara Eliya in 2010. He was the Senior Vice President of Ceylon Workers Congress.
