= M. Rameshwaran =

Sri Lankan politician

Hon. M. Rameshwaran MP
- எம். ராமேஸ்வரன் මරුදපාණ්ඩි රාමේෂ්වරන්

Member of the Parliament of Sri Lanka
- Incumbent
- Assumed office 2020
- Constituency: Nuwara Eliya District

Member of the Central Provincial Council
- In office 2009–2018
- Constituency: Nuwara Eliya District

Personal details
- Born: 26 December 1976 (age 49)
- Party: Ceylon Workers' Congress
- Other political affiliations: Sri Lanka People's Freedom Alliance

Marudapandy Rameshwaran (born 26 December 1976) is a Sri Lankan politician, former provincial minister and Member of Parliament.

Rameshwaran was born on 26 December 1976. He was treasurer and deputy president of the Ceylon Workers' Congress. He was a member of the Central Provincial Council and held several provincial ministerial portfolios. He was arrested in December 2017 in connection with an assault on a National Union of Workers supporter at a funeral in Maskeliya and later released on bail.

Rameshwaran contested the 2020 parliamentary election as a Sri Lanka People's Freedom Alliance electoral alliance candidate in Nuwara Eliya District and was elected to the Parliament of Sri Lanka.

Electoral history of M. Rameshwaran
Election	Constituency	Party	Alliance	Votes	Result
2009 provincial	Nuwara Eliya District	Ceylon Workers' Congress	United People's Freedom Alliance	21,544	Elected
2013 provincial	Nuwara Eliya District	Ceylon Workers' Congress	United People's Freedom Alliance	44,495	Elected
2020 parliamentary	Nuwara Eliya District	Ceylon Workers' Congress	Sri Lanka People's Freedom Alliance	57,167	Elected
