= Palani Thigambaram =

Sri Lankan politician (born 1967)

Hon. Palani Thigambaram MP MPC
- பழனி திகாம்பரம் පලනි දිගම්බරම්
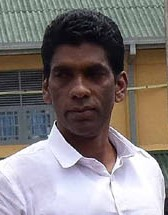
- Thigambaram in May 2017

Minister of Hill Country, New Villages, Infrastructure and Community Development
- In office 4 September 2015 – 18 November 2019
- President: Maithripala Sirisena
- Prime Minister: Ranil Wickremesinghe

Minister of Plantation Infrastructure Development
- In office 12 January 2015 – 17 August 2015

Deputy Minister of National Languages and Social Integration
- In office 21 August 2014 – 10 December 2014

Member of Parliament for Nuwara Eliya District
- Incumbent
- Assumed office 2010

Member of the Central Provincial Council for Nuwara Eliya District
- In office 2004–2010
- Succeeded by: G. M. M. Piyasiri

Personal details
- Born: 10 January 1967 (age 59)
- Party: National Union of Workers

S. Udeiappan Palani Alagan Thigambaram (Tamil: எஸ். உடையப்பன் பழனி அழகன் திகாம்பரம்; born 10 January 1967) is a Sri Lankan politician and government minister. He is the leader of the National Union of Workers (NUW), a member of the Tamil Progressive Alliance (TPA) and United National Front for Good Governance (UNFGG).

== Early life ==
Thigambaram was born on 10 January 1967.

== Career ==
Thigambaram runs a textile business and is leader of the National Union of Workers (NUW).

Thigambaram contested the 2004 provincial council election as one of the Up-Country People's Front's candidates in Nuwara Eliya District and was elected to the Central Provincial Council. He was re-elected at the 2009 provincial council election, this times as a United National Front (UNF) candidate.

Thigambaram contested the 2010 parliamentary election as one of the UNF candidates in Nuwara Eliya District and was elected to Parliament. The NUW left the UNF alliance on 22 April 2010 after a dispute over National List seats. Thigambaram continued to be part of the opposition as an independent MP. In August 2013 Thigambaram and two others were charged with attempting to acquire 12 perches of land and a vehicle by force from their lawful owner but the case was dropped after the defendants offered to compensate the victim for the vehicle.

Thigambaram was appointed Deputy Minister of National Languages and Social Integration on 21 August 2014. He resigned from the UPFA government on 10 December 2014 to support common opposition candidate Maithripala Sirisena at the presidential election. After the election newly elected President Sirisena rewarded Thigambaram by appointing him Minister of Plantation Infrastructure Development.

Thigambaram was one of the United National Front for Good Governance's candidates in Nuwara Eliya District at the 2015 parliamentary election. He was elected and re-entered Parliament. He was sworn in as Minister of Hill Country, New Villages, Infrastructure and Community Development on 4 September 2015.

== Electoral history ==
Electoral history of Palani Thigambaram
Election	Constituency	Party	Alliance	Votes	Result
2004 provincial	Nuwara Eliya District	National Union of Workers	Up-Country People's Front	18,387	Elected
2009 provincial	Nuwara Eliya District	National Union of Workers	United National Front	45,229	Elected
2010 parliamentary	Nuwara Eliya District	National Union of Workers	United National Front	39,490	Elected
2015 parliamentary	Nuwara Eliya District	National Union of Workers	United National Front for Good Governance	105,528	Elected
