= Nuwara Eliya Maskeliya Polling Division =

Nuwara Eliya Maskeliya
- Polling Division
- Coordinates: 6.910895°N 80.639422°E
- Country: Sri Lanka
- Province: Central Province, Sri Lanka
- Electoral District: Nuwara Eliya Electoral District

Area
  - Total: 972.52 km^{2} (375.49 sq mi)

Population (2012)
  - Total: 417,817
  - Density: 430/km^{2} (1,100/sq mi)
- ISO 3166 code: EC-06A

The Nuwara Eliya Maskeliya Polling Division is a Polling Division in the Nuwara Eliya Electoral District, in the Central Province, Sri Lanka.

== Presidential Election Results ==
=== Summary ===
The winner of Nuwara Eliya Maskeliya has matched the final country result 4 out of 8 times.

Year	Nuwara Eliya Maskeliya	Nuwara Eliya Electoral District	MAE %	Sri Lanka	MAE %
2019	NDF	NDF	7.72%	SLPP	22.60%
2015	NDF	NDF	9.07%	NDF	22.10%
2010	NDF	NDF	9.05%	UPFA	22.32%
2005	UNP	UNP	10.47%	UPFA	32.36%
1999	UNP	UNP	4.13%	PA	8.86%
1994	PA	PA	3.99%	PA	1.36%
1988	UNP	UNP	6.39%	UNP	16.32%
1982	UNP	UNP	6.39%	UNP	13.99%
Matches/Mean MAE	4/8	4/8	7.15%	8/8	17.49%

=== 2019 Sri Lankan Presidential Election ===
Party	Nuwara Eliya Maskeliya		Nuwara Eliya Electoral District		Sri Lanka	
Party	Votes	%	Votes	%	Votes	%
NDF	174,413	66.37%	277,913	58.28%	5,564,239	41.99%
SLPP	75,499	28.73%	175,823	36.87%	6,924,255	52.25%
Other Parties (with < 1%)	12,878	4.90%	23,128	4.85%	764,005	5.76%
Valid Votes	262,790	98.37%	476,864	98.52%	13,252,499	98.99%
Rejected Votes	4,358	1.63%	7,155	1.48%	135,452	1.01%
Total Polled	267,148	83.87%	484,019	85.06%	13,387,951	83.71%
Registered Electors	318,528		569,028		15,992,568	

=== 2015 Sri Lankan Presidential Election ===
Party	Nuwara Eliya Maskeliya		Nuwara Eliya Electoral District		Sri Lanka	
Party	Votes	%	Votes	%	Votes	%
NDF	171,578	73.01%	272,605	63.88%	6,217,162	51.28%
UPFA	57,718	24.56%	145,339	34.06%	5,768,090	47.58%
Other Parties (with < 1%)	5,700	2.43%	8,822	2.07%	138,200	1.14%
Valid Votes	234,996	98.35%	426,766	98.31%	12,123,452	98.85%
Rejected Votes	3,939	1.65%	7,329	1.69%	140,925	1.15%
Total Polled	238,935	78.90%	434,095	79.25%	12,264,377	78.69%
Registered Electors	302,836		547,766		15,585,942	

=== 2010 Sri Lankan Presidential Election ===
Party	Nuwara Eliya Maskeliya		Nuwara Eliya Electoral District		Sri Lanka	
Party	Votes	%	Votes	%	Votes	%
NDF	112,866	61.30%	180,604	52.14%	4,173,185	40.15%
UPFA	62,604	34.00%	151,604	43.77%	6,015,934	57.88%
Other Parties (with < 1%)	5,965	3.24%	10,040	2.90%	165,268	1.59%
DUNF	2,693	1.46%	4,134	1.19%	39,226	0.38%
Valid Votes	184,128	98.03%	346,382	98.17%	10,393,613	99.03%
Rejected Votes	3,693	1.97%	6,462	1.83%	101,838	0.97%
Total Polled	187,821	76.02%	352,844	75.65%	10,495,451	66.70%
Registered Electors	247,069		466,440		15,734,587	

=== 2005 Sri Lankan Presidential Election ===
Party	Nuwara Eliya Maskeliya		Nuwara Eliya Electoral District		Sri Lanka	
Party	Votes	%	Votes	%	Votes	%
UNP	156,343	81.02%	250,428	70.37%	4,706,366	48.43%
UPFA	33,453	17.34%	99,550	27.97%	4,887,152	50.29%
Other Parties (with < 1%)	3,165	1.64%	5,897	1.66%	123,521	1.27%
Valid Votes	192,961	98.55%	355,875	98.50%	9,717,039	98.88%
Rejected Votes	2,841	1.45%	5,410	1.50%	109,869	1.12%
Total Polled	195,802	79.57%	361,285	79.49%	9,826,908	69.51%
Registered Electors	246,062		454,528		14,136,979	

=== 1999 Sri Lankan Presidential Election ===
Party	Nuwara Eliya Maskeliya		Nuwara Eliya Electoral District		Sri Lanka	
Party	Votes	%	Votes	%	Votes	%
UNP	87,653	53.09%	152,836	48.68%	3,602,748	42.71%
PA	70,497	42.70%	147,210	46.88%	4,312,157	51.12%
Other Parties (with < 1%)	5,050	3.06%	8,065	2.57%	176,679	2.09%
JVP	1,897	1.15%	5,879	1.87%	343,927	4.08%
Valid Votes	165,097	97.13%	313,990	97.21%	8,435,754	97.69%
Rejected Votes	4,885	2.87%	8,997	2.79%	199,536	2.31%
Total Polled	169,982	78.68%	322,987	80.23%	8,635,290	72.17%
Registered Electors	216,038		402,589		11,965,536	

=== 1994 Sri Lankan Presidential Election ===
Party	Nuwara Eliya Maskeliya		Nuwara Eliya Electoral District		Sri Lanka	
Party	Votes	%	Votes	%	Votes	%
PA	94,262	60.78%	168,929	57.14%	4,709,205	62.28%
UNP	53,949	34.79%	116,928	39.55%	2,715,283	35.91%
Ind 2	4,897	3.16%	6,314	2.14%	58,888	0.78%
Other Parties (with < 1%)	1,983	1.28%	3,459	1.17%	78,152	1.03%
Valid Votes	155,091	95.44%	295,630	96.15%	7,561,526	98.03%
Rejected Votes	7,412	4.56%	11,840	3.85%	151,706	1.97%
Total Polled	162,503	76.40%	307,470	78.19%	7,713,232	69.12%
Registered Electors	212,690		393,221		11,158,880	

=== 1988 Sri Lankan Presidential Election ===
Party	Nuwara Eliya Maskeliya		Nuwara Eliya Electoral District		Sri Lanka	
Party	Votes	%	Votes	%	Votes	%
UNP	52,653	68.25%	112,135	62.15%	2,569,199	50.43%
SLFP	22,209	28.79%	64,907	35.98%	2,289,857	44.95%
SLMP	2,290	2.97%	3,371	1.87%	235,701	4.63%
Valid Votes	77,152	97.76%	180,413	98.19%	5,094,754	98.24%
Rejected Votes	1,771	2.24%	3,320	1.81%	91,499	1.76%
Total Polled	78,923	77.55%	183,733	79.44%	5,186,256	55.87%
Registered Electors	101,765		231,278		9,283,143	

=== 1982 Sri Lankan Presidential Election ===
Party	Nuwara Eliya Maskeliya		Nuwara Eliya Electoral District		Sri Lanka	
Party	Votes	%	Votes	%	Votes	%
UNP	49,414	69.59%	109,017	63.10%	3,450,815	52.93%
SLFP	18,543	26.11%	57,093	33.05%	2,546,348	39.05%
JVP	1,892	2.66%	4,569	2.64%	273,428	4.19%
Other Parties (with < 1%)	1,157	1.63%	2,090	1.21%	249,460	3.83%
Valid Votes	71,006	98.68%	172,769	98.83%	6,520,156	98.78%
Rejected Votes	950	1.32%	2,048	1.17%	80,470	1.22%
Total Polled	71,956	83.20%	174,817	85.71%	6,600,626	80.15%
Registered Electors	86,487		203,968		8,235,358	

== Parliamentary Election Results ==
=== Summary ===
The winner of Nuwara Eliya Maskeliya has matched the final country result 5 out of 7 times. Hence, Nuwara Eliya Maskeliya is a Weak Bellwether for Parliamentary Elections.

Year	Nuwara Eliya Maskeliya	Nuwara Eliya Electoral District	MAE %	Sri Lanka	MAE %
2015	UNP	UNP	2.70%	UNP	10.62%
2010	UPFA	UPFA	5.18%	UPFA	9.98%
2004	UNP	UNP	4.97%	UPFA	21.51%
2001	UNP	UNP	7.18%	UNP	22.01%
2000	PA	PA	3.89%	PA	3.54%
1994	UNP	UNP	3.85%	PA	18.77%
1989	UNP	UNP	3.87%	UNP	8.26%
Matches/Mean MAE	5/7	5/7	4.52%	7/7	13.53%

=== 2015 Sri Lankan Parliamentary Election ===
Party	Nuwara Eliya Maskeliya		Nuwara Eliya Electoral District		Sri Lanka	
Party	Votes	%	Votes	%	Votes	%
UNP	131,952	61.87%	228,920	59.06%	5,098,916	45.77%
UPFA	75,267	35.29%	147,348	38.02%	4,732,664	42.48%
Other Parties (with < 1%)	6,040	2.83%	11,317	2.92%	631,897	5.67%
Valid Votes	213,259	92.08%	387,585	92.12%	11,140,333	95.35%
Rejected Votes	18,101	7.82%	32,788	7.79%	516,926	4.42%
Total Polled	231,597	76.48%	420,734	78.77%	11,684,111	77.66%
Registered Electors	302,836		534,150		15,044,490	

=== 2010 Sri Lankan Parliamentary Election ===
Party	Nuwara Eliya Maskeliya		Nuwara Eliya Electoral District		Sri Lanka	
Party	Votes	%	Votes	%	Votes	%
UPFA	72,766	49.76%	149,111	56.06%	4,846,388	60.38%
UNP	59,339	40.58%	96,885	36.43%	2,357,057	29.37%
UPF	10,912	7.46%	13,189	4.96%	24,670	0.31%
Other Parties (with < 1%)	3,210	2.20%	6,777	2.55%	475,687	5.93%
Valid Votes	146,227	87.91%	265,962	87.64%	8,026,322	96.03%
Rejected Votes	19,969	12.01%	37,236	12.27%	581,465	6.96%
Total Polled	166,331	67.32%	303,470	64.94%	8,358,246	59.29%
Registered Electors	247,069		467,332		14,097,690	

=== 2004 Sri Lankan Parliamentary Election ===
Party	Nuwara Eliya Maskeliya		Nuwara Eliya Electoral District		Sri Lanka	
Party	Votes	%	Votes	%	Votes	%
UNP	100,350	55.85%	176,971	54.02%	3,486,792	37.73%
UPF	41,563	23.13%	49,728	15.18%	49,728	0.54%
UPFA	25,989	14.46%	82,945	25.32%	4,223,126	45.70%
CDUA	7,331	4.08%	10,736	3.28%	10,736	0.12%
JHU	2,617	1.46%	4,454	1.36%	552,723	5.98%
Other Parties (with < 1%)	1,822	1.01%	2,775	0.85%	42,827	0.46%
Valid Votes	179,672	92.97%	327,609	93.06%	9,241,931	94.52%
Rejected Votes	13,594	7.03%	24,413	6.94%	534,452	5.47%
Total Polled	193,266	80.69%	352,022	80.70%	9,777,821	75.74%
Registered Electors	239,511		436,236		12,909,631	

=== 2001 Sri Lankan Parliamentary Election ===
Party	Nuwara Eliya Maskeliya		Nuwara Eliya Electoral District		Sri Lanka	
Party	Votes	%	Votes	%	Votes	%
UNP	130,633	75.81%	215,157	68.28%	4,086,026	45.62%
PA	28,734	16.68%	77,733	24.67%	3,330,815	37.19%
NDP	6,206	3.60%	6,600	2.09%	6,952	0.08%
JVP	4,227	2.45%	11,080	3.52%	815,353	9.10%
Other Parties (with < 1%)	2,505	1.45%	4,529	1.44%	136,882	1.53%
Valid Votes	172,305	92.43%	315,099	91.74%	8,955,844	94.77%
Rejected Votes	14,103	7.57%	28,373	8.26%	494,009	5.23%
Total Polled	186,408	81.64%	343,472	82.32%	9,449,878	76.03%
Registered Electors	228,317		417,264		12,428,762	

=== 2000 Sri Lankan Parliamentary Election ===
Party	Nuwara Eliya Maskeliya		Nuwara Eliya Electoral District		Sri Lanka	
Party	Votes	%	Votes	%	Votes	%
PA	75,788	47.84%	158,018	52.53%	3,899,329	45.33%
UNP	71,854	45.36%	126,486	42.05%	3,451,765	40.12%
TNUoW	4,506	2.84%	4,671	1.55%	5,737	0.07%
JVP	2,311	1.46%	6,299	2.09%	518,725	6.03%
PP	2,049	1.29%	2,445	0.81%	19,830	0.23%
Other Parties (with < 1%)	1,901	1.20%	2,887	0.96%	221,673	2.58%
Valid Votes	158,409	N/A	300,806	N/A	8,602,617	N/A

=== 1994 Sri Lankan Parliamentary Election ===
Party	Nuwara Eliya Maskeliya		Nuwara Eliya Electoral District		Sri Lanka	
Party	Votes	%	Votes	%	Votes	%
UNP	94,893	59.57%	175,478	58.12%	3,498,370	44.04%
PA	39,476	24.78%	97,658	32.35%	3,887,805	48.94%
IND1	24,248	15.22%	27,374	9.07%	48,199	0.61%
Other Parties (with < 1%)	674	0.42%	1,408	0.47%	158,616	2.00%
Valid Votes	159,291	92.26%	301,918	93.33%	7,943,688	95.20%
Rejected Votes	13,368	7.74%	21,592	6.67%	400,395	4.80%
Total Polled	172,659	81.18%	323,510	82.37%	8,344,095	74.75%
Registered Electors	212,690		392,770		11,163,064	

=== 1989 Sri Lankan Parliamentary Election ===
Party	Nuwara Eliya Maskeliya		Nuwara Eliya Electoral District		Sri Lanka	
Party	Votes	%	Votes	%	Votes	%
UNP	44,252	60.24%	109,853	63.34%	2,838,005	50.71%
SLFP	15,928	21.68%	47,128	27.18%	1,785,369	31.90%
DPLF	8,718	11.87%	10,509	6.06%	19,150	0.34%
USA	3,488	4.75%	4,214	2.43%	141,983	2.54%
SLMC	1,078	1.47%	1,720	0.99%	202,016	3.61%
Valid Votes	73,464	92.52%	173,424	92.73%	5,596,468	93.87%
Rejected Votes	5,937	7.48%	13,600	7.27%	365,563	6.13%
Total Polled	79,401	79.29%	187,024	81.49%	5,962,031	63.60%
Registered Electors	100,139		229,519		9,374,164	

== Demographics ==
=== Ethnicity ===
The Nuwara Eliya Maskeliya Polling Division has an Indian Tamil majority (71.0%) and a significant Sinhalese population (20.8%). In comparison, the Nuwara Eliya Electoral District (which contains the Nuwara Eliya Maskeliya Polling Division) has an Indian Tamil majority (53.1%) and a significant Sinhalese population (39.6%)

Ethnicity in Nuwara Eliya Maskeliya
1. Indian Tamil (71.0%)
2. Sinhalese (20.8%)
3. Sri Lankan Tamil (5.50%)
4. Moor (2.40%)
5. Other (0.30%)

=== Religion ===
The Nuwara Eliya Maskeliya Polling Division has a Hindu majority (67.2%) and a significant Buddhist population (20.0%) . In comparison, the Nuwara Eliya Electoral District (which contains the Nuwara Eliya Maskeliya Polling Division) has a Hindu majority (51.0%) and a significant Buddhist population (39.1%)

Religion in Nuwara Eliya Maskeliya
1. Hindu (67.2%)
2. Buddhist (20.0%)
3. Roman Catholic (6.90%)
4. Muslim (3.00%)
5. Other Christian (2.80%)
6. Other (0.00%)
