= Kothmale Polling Division =

Kothmale
- Polling Division
- Coordinates: 7.038898°N 80.629340°E
- Country: Sri Lanka
- Province: Central Province, Sri Lanka
- Electoral District: Nuwara Eliya Electoral District

Area
  - Total: 216.52 km^{2} (83.60 sq mi)

Population (2012)
  - Total: 101,180
  - Density: 467/km^{2} (1,210/sq mi)
- ISO 3166 code: EC-06B

The Kothmale Polling Division is a polling division in the Nuwara Eliya Electoral District of Central Province, Sri Lanka.

== Presidential election results ==
=== Summary ===
The winner of Kothmale has matched the final country result 5 out of 8 times. Hence, Kothmale is a Weak Bellwether for Presidential Elections.

Year	Kothmale	Nuwara Eliya Electoral District	MAE %	Sri Lanka	MAE %
2019	NDF	NDF	3.57%	SLPP	11.33%
2015	NDF	NDF	4.49%	NDF	8.29%
2010	NDF	NDF	1.61%	UPFA	11.24%
2005	UNP	UNP	6.12%	UPFA	15.70%
1999	PA	UNP	2.01%	PA	2.81%
1994	PA	PA	5.80%	PA	10.34%
1988	UNP	UNP	6.11%	UNP	4.10%
1982	UNP	UNP	4.17%	UNP	3.84%
Matches/Mean MAE	5/8	4/8	4.23%	8/8	8.46%

=== 2019 Sri Lankan Presidential Election ===
Party	Kothmale		Nuwara Eliya Electoral District		Sri Lanka	
Party	Votes	%	Votes	%	Votes	%
NDF	36,901	54.70%	277,913	58.28%	5,564,239	41.99%
SLPP	27,572	40.87%	175,823	36.87%	6,924,255	52.25%
Other Parties (with < 1%)	1,929	2.86%	17,237	3.61%	345,452	2.61%
NMPP	1,057	1.57%	5,891	1.24%	418,553	3.16%
Valid Votes	67,459	98.78%	476,864	98.52%	13,252,499	98.99%
Rejected Votes	833	1.22%	7,155	1.48%	135,452	1.01%
Total Polled	68,292	85.22%	484,019	85.06%	13,387,951	83.71%
Registered Electors	80,139		569,028		15,992,568	

=== 2015 Sri Lankan Presidential Election ===
Party	Kothmale		Nuwara Eliya Electoral District		Sri Lanka	
Party	Votes	%	Votes	%	Votes	%
NDF	36,343	59.48%	272,605	63.88%	6,217,162	51.28%
UPFA	23,821	38.99%	145,339	34.06%	5,768,090	47.58%
Other Parties (with < 1%)	935	1.53%	8,822	2.07%	138,200	1.14%
Valid Votes	61,099	98.36%	426,766	98.31%	12,123,452	98.85%
Rejected Votes	1,018	1.64%	7,329	1.69%	140,925	1.15%
Total Polled	62,117	79.57%	434,095	79.25%	12,264,377	78.69%
Registered Electors	78,068		547,766		15,585,942	

=== 2010 Sri Lankan Presidential Election ===
Party	Kothmale		Nuwara Eliya Electoral District		Sri Lanka	
Party	Votes	%	Votes	%	Votes	%
NDF	26,727	50.84%	180,604	52.14%	4,173,185	40.15%
UPFA	24,120	45.88%	151,604	43.77%	6,015,934	57.88%
Other Parties (with < 1%)	1,192	2.27%	10,040	2.90%	165,268	1.59%
DUNF	531	1.01%	4,134	1.19%	39,226	0.38%
Valid Votes	52,570	98.03%	346,382	98.17%	10,393,613	99.03%
Rejected Votes	1,057	1.97%	6,462	1.83%	101,838	0.97%
Total Polled	53,627	75.82%	352,844	75.65%	10,495,451	66.70%
Registered Electors	70,730		466,440		15,734,587	

=== 2005 Sri Lankan Presidential Election ===
Party	Kothmale		Nuwara Eliya Electoral District		Sri Lanka	
Party	Votes	%	Votes	%	Votes	%
UNP	33,073	64.16%	250,428	70.37%	4,706,366	48.43%
UPFA	17,645	34.23%	99,550	27.97%	4,887,152	50.29%
Other Parties (with < 1%)	830	1.61%	5,897	1.66%	123,521	1.27%
Valid Votes	51,548	98.89%	355,875	98.50%	9,717,039	98.88%
Rejected Votes	576	1.11%	5,410	1.50%	109,869	1.12%
Total Polled	52,124	78.98%	361,285	79.49%	9,826,908	69.51%
Registered Electors	65,998		454,528		14,136,979	

=== 1999 Sri Lankan Presidential Election ===
Party	Kothmale		Nuwara Eliya Electoral District		Sri Lanka	
Party	Votes	%	Votes	%	Votes	%
PA	22,068	49.23%	147,210	46.88%	4,312,157	51.12%
UNP	20,984	46.82%	152,836	48.68%	3,602,748	42.71%
Other Parties (with < 1%)	945	2.11%	8,065	2.57%	176,679	2.09%
JVP	826	1.84%	5,879	1.87%	343,927	4.08%
Valid Votes	44,823	97.41%	313,990	97.21%	8,435,754	97.69%
Rejected Votes	1,193	2.59%	8,997	2.79%	199,536	2.31%
Total Polled	46,016	77.56%	322,987	80.23%	8,635,290	72.17%
Registered Electors	59,333		402,589		11,965,536	

=== 1994 Sri Lankan Presidential Election ===
Party	Kothmale		Nuwara Eliya Electoral District		Sri Lanka	
Party	Votes	%	Votes	%	Votes	%
PA	22,034	51.58%	168,929	57.14%	4,709,205	62.28%
UNP	19,708	46.14%	116,928	39.55%	2,715,283	35.91%
Ind 2	555	1.30%	6,314	2.14%	58,888	0.78%
Other Parties (with < 1%)	419	0.98%	3,459	1.17%	78,152	1.03%
Valid Votes	42,716	96.28%	295,630	96.15%	7,561,526	98.03%
Rejected Votes	1,651	3.72%	11,840	3.85%	151,706	1.97%
Total Polled	44,367	77.87%	307,470	78.19%	7,713,232	69.12%
Registered Electors	56,977		393,221		11,158,880	

=== 1988 Sri Lankan Presidential Election ===
Party	Kothmale		Nuwara Eliya Electoral District		Sri Lanka	
Party	Votes	%	Votes	%	Votes	%
UNP	17,822	56.32%	112,135	62.15%	2,569,199	50.43%
SLFP	13,549	42.82%	64,907	35.98%	2,289,857	44.95%
Other Parties (with < 1%)	272	0.86%	3,371	1.87%	235,701	4.63%
Valid Votes	31,643	98.75%	180,413	98.19%	5,094,754	98.24%
Rejected Votes	401	1.25%	3,320	1.81%	91,499	1.76%
Total Polled	32,044	81.76%	183,733	79.44%	5,186,256	55.87%
Registered Electors	39,194		231,278		9,283,143	

=== 1982 Sri Lankan Presidential Election ===
Party	Kothmale		Nuwara Eliya Electoral District		Sri Lanka	
Party	Votes	%	Votes	%	Votes	%
UNP	18,684	59.19%	109,017	63.10%	3,450,815	52.93%
SLFP	12,036	38.13%	57,093	33.05%	2,546,348	39.05%
JVP	616	1.95%	4,569	2.64%	273,428	4.19%
Other Parties (with < 1%)	229	0.73%	2,090	1.21%	249,460	3.83%
Valid Votes	31,565	99.00%	172,769	98.83%	6,520,156	98.78%
Rejected Votes	320	1.00%	2,048	1.17%	80,470	1.22%
Total Polled	31,885	85.89%	174,817	85.71%	6,600,626	80.15%
Registered Electors	37,124		203,968		8,235,358	

== Parliamentary election results ==
=== Summary ===
The winner of Kothmale has matched the final country result 5 out of 7 times. Hence, Kothmale is a Weak Bellwether for Parliamentary Elections.

Year	Kothmale	Nuwara Eliya Electoral District	MAE %	Sri Lanka	MAE %
2015	UNP	UNP	1.95%	UNP	6.35%
2010	UPFA	UPFA	4.17%	UPFA	2.10%
2004	UNP	UNP	3.58%	UPFA	11.74%
2001	UNP	UNP	4.71%	UNP	11.07%
2000	PA	PA	3.41%	PA	5.04%
1994	UNP	UNP	2.58%	PA	13.13%
1989	UNP	UNP	1.64%	UNP	6.94%
Matches/Mean MAE	5/7	5/7	3.15%	7/7	8.05%

=== 2015 Sri Lankan Parliamentary Election ===
Party	Kothmale		Nuwara Eliya Electoral District		Sri Lanka	
Party	Votes	%	Votes	%	Votes	%
UNP	31,373	57.12%	228,920	59.06%	5,098,916	45.77%
UPFA	22,031	40.11%	147,348	38.02%	4,732,664	42.48%
JVP	1,034	1.88%	5,590	1.44%	544,154	4.88%
Other Parties (with < 1%)	487	0.89%	5,727	1.48%	87,743	0.79%
Valid Votes	54,925	92.38%	387,585	92.12%	11,140,333	95.35%
Rejected Votes	4,482	7.54%	32,788	7.79%	516,926	4.42%
Total Polled	59,454	76.16%	420,734	78.77%	11,684,111	77.66%
Registered Electors	78,068		534,150		15,044,490	

=== 2010 Sri Lankan Parliamentary Election ===
Party	Kothmale		Nuwara Eliya Electoral District		Sri Lanka	
Party	Votes	%	Votes	%	Votes	%
UPFA	24,790	61.45%	149,111	56.06%	4,846,388	60.38%
UNP	13,553	33.60%	96,885	36.43%	2,357,057	29.37%
UPF	1,120	2.78%	13,189	4.96%	24,670	0.31%
DNA	700	1.74%	3,984	1.50%	441,251	5.50%
Other Parties (with < 1%)	177	0.44%	2,793	1.05%	34,436	0.43%
Valid Votes	40,340	88.25%	265,962	87.64%	8,026,322	96.03%
Rejected Votes	5,327	11.65%	37,236	12.27%	581,465	6.96%
Total Polled	45,711	64.63%	303,470	64.94%	8,358,246	59.29%
Registered Electors	70,730		467,332		14,097,690	

=== 2004 Sri Lankan Parliamentary Election ===
Party	Kothmale		Nuwara Eliya Electoral District		Sri Lanka	
Party	Votes	%	Votes	%	Votes	%
UNP	25,390	52.96%	176,971	54.02%	3,486,792	37.73%
UPFA	15,964	33.30%	82,945	25.32%	4,223,126	45.70%
UPF	4,182	8.72%	49,728	15.18%	49,728	0.54%
CDUA	1,563	3.26%	10,736	3.28%	10,736	0.12%
JHU	593	1.24%	4,454	1.36%	552,723	5.98%
Other Parties (with < 1%)	250	0.52%	2,775	0.85%	42,827	0.46%
Valid Votes	47,942	94.30%	327,609	93.06%	9,241,931	94.52%
Rejected Votes	2,896	5.70%	24,413	6.94%	534,452	5.47%
Total Polled	50,838	78.16%	352,022	80.70%	9,777,821	75.74%
Registered Electors	65,044		436,236		12,909,631	

=== 2001 Sri Lankan Parliamentary Election ===
Party	Kothmale		Nuwara Eliya Electoral District		Sri Lanka	
Party	Votes	%	Votes	%	Votes	%
UNP	29,549	63.77%	215,157	68.28%	4,086,026	45.62%
PA	14,421	31.12%	77,733	24.67%	3,330,815	37.19%
JVP	1,508	3.25%	11,080	3.52%	815,353	9.10%
Other Parties (with < 1%)	859	1.85%	11,129	3.53%	143,834	1.61%
Valid Votes	46,337	92.72%	315,099	91.74%	8,955,844	94.77%
Rejected Votes	3,638	7.28%	28,373	8.26%	494,009	5.23%
Total Polled	49,975	80.30%	343,472	82.32%	9,449,878	76.03%
Registered Electors	62,232		417,264		12,428,762	

=== 2000 Sri Lankan Parliamentary Election ===
Party	Kothmale		Nuwara Eliya Electoral District		Sri Lanka	
Party	Votes	%	Votes	%	Votes	%
PA	21,623	49.94%	158,018	52.53%	3,899,329	45.33%
UNP	20,283	46.85%	126,486	42.05%	3,451,765	40.12%
JVP	950	2.19%	6,299	2.09%	518,725	6.03%
Other Parties (with < 1%)	438	1.01%	10,003	3.33%	247,240	2.87%
Valid Votes	43,294	N/A	300,806	N/A	8,602,617	N/A

=== 1994 Sri Lankan Parliamentary Election ===
Party	Kothmale		Nuwara Eliya Electoral District		Sri Lanka	
Party	Votes	%	Votes	%	Votes	%
UNP	26,542	59.58%	175,478	58.12%	3,498,370	44.04%
PA	16,112	36.17%	97,658	32.35%	3,887,805	48.94%
IND1	1,610	3.61%	27,374	9.07%	48,199	0.61%
Other Parties (with < 1%)	284	0.64%	1,408	0.47%	158,616	2.00%
Valid Votes	44,548	94.47%	301,918	93.33%	7,943,688	95.20%
Rejected Votes	2,607	5.53%	21,592	6.67%	400,395	4.80%
Total Polled	47,155	82.76%	323,510	82.37%	8,344,095	74.75%
Registered Electors	56,977		392,770		11,163,064	

=== 1989 Sri Lankan Parliamentary Election ===
Party	Kothmale		Nuwara Eliya Electoral District		Sri Lanka	
Party	Votes	%	Votes	%	Votes	%
UNP	18,712	63.76%	109,853	63.34%	2,838,005	50.71%
SLFP	9,175	31.26%	47,128	27.18%	1,785,369	31.90%
DPLF	710	2.42%	10,509	6.06%	19,150	0.34%
SLMC	492	1.68%	1,720	0.99%	202,016	3.61%
Other Parties (with < 1%)	260	0.89%	4,214	2.43%	141,983	2.54%
Valid Votes	29,349	92.33%	173,424	92.73%	5,596,468	93.87%
Rejected Votes	2,439	7.67%	13,600	7.27%	365,563	6.13%
Total Polled	31,788	82.17%	187,024	81.49%	5,962,031	63.60%
Registered Electors	38,688		229,519		9,374,164	

== Demographics ==
=== Ethnicity ===
The Kothmale Polling Division has a Sinhalese majority (52.6%) and a significant Indian Tamil population (36.4%) . In comparison, the Nuwara Eliya Electoral District (which contains the Kothmale Polling Division) has an Indian Tamil majority (53.1%) and a significant Sinhalese population (39.6%)

Ethnicity in Kothmale
1. Sinhalese (52.6%)
2. Indian Tamil (36.4%)
3. Moor (6.80%)
4. Sri Lankan Tamil (4.00%)
5. Other (0.30%)

=== Religion ===
The Kothmale Polling Division has a Buddhist majority (52.3%) and a significant Hindu population (36.5%) . In comparison, the Nuwara Eliya Electoral District (which contains the Kothmale Polling Division) has a Hindu majority (51.0%) and a significant Buddhist population (39.1%)

Religion in Kothmale
1. Buddhist (52.3%)
2. Hindu (36.5%)
3. Muslim (7.20%)
4. Roman Catholic (2.40%)
5. Other Christian (1.60%)
6. Other (0.00%)
