= N. D. N. P. Jayasinghe =

Sri Lankan politician

Hon. N. D. N. P. Jayasinghe MP

Member of Parliament for Nuwara Eliya District
- In office 2004–2010

Personal details
- Party: National Freedom Front
- Other political affiliations: United People's Freedom Alliance

N. D. N. P. Jayasinghe or Nimal Premawansa Jayasinghe is a Sri Lankan politician and a former member of the Parliament of Sri Lanka.
