= Velusami Radhakrishnan =

Sri Lankan politician (born 1952)

Hon. Velusami Radhakrishnan MP MPC
- வேலுசாமி இராதாகிருஷ்ணன் අකන්දන් වේලුසාමි රාධාක්‍රිෂ්ණන්
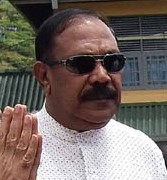
- Radhakrishnan in May 2017

State Minister of Education
- Incumbent
- Assumed office 12 January 2015

Deputy Minister of Botanical Gardens and Public Recreation
- In office 9 October 2014 – 10 December 2014

Member of Parliament for Nuwara Eliya District
- Incumbent
- Assumed office 8 April 2010

Member of the Central Provincial Council for Nuwara Eliya District
- In office 1999–2010

Personal details
- Born: 1 August 1952 (age 74)
- Party: Up-Country People's Front

Akandhan Velusami Radhakrishnan (Tamil: அகண்டன் வேலுசாமி இராதாகிருஷ்ணன்; born 1 August 1952) is a Sri Lankan politician. He is the leader of the Up-Country People's Front (UCPF), a member of the Tamil Progressive Alliance (TPA) and United National Front for Good Governance (UNFGG).

== Early life and family ==
Radhakrishnan was born on 1 August 10.1952 He was educated at Holy Trinity College, Nuwara Eliya, St. Peter's College, Colombo and St. Joseph's College, Colombo. He is married and has four children.

== Career ==
Radhakrishnan was elected to Nuwara Eliya Divisional Council and became its chairman in 1991. He contested the 1999 provincial council election as one of the Indian Origin People's Front's candidates in Nuwara Eliya District and was elected to the Central Provincial Council (CPC). He was Minister of Culture and Tamil Education. He contested the 2004 provincial council election as one of the United National Front's (UNF) candidates in Nuwara Eliya District and was re-elected to the CPC. In February 2005 he was appointed Minister of Tamil Education (other than Muslim Schools) Industries, Estate Infrastructure Facilities, Hindu Cultural Affairs, Youth Affairs and Sports. He was re-elected at the 2009 provincial council election, this times as a United People's Freedom Alliance (UPFA) candidate. In March 2009 he was appointed Minister of Industries, Sports, Women Affairs, Rural Development, Estate Infrastructure Facilities Development, Hindu Cultural Affairs, Education (Tamil) and Youth Affairs.

Radhakrishnan contested the 2010 parliamentary election as one of the UPFA's candidates in Nuwara Eliya District and was elected to Parliament. On 11 September 2010 Radhakrishnan left the Ceylon Workers' Congress to sit as an independent MP supporting UPFA. He joined the Up-Country People's Front as its political leader on 7 October 2010. He was appointed Deputy Minister of Botanical Gardens and Public Recreation on 9 October 2014.

Radhakrishnan resigned from the UPFA government on 10 December 2014 to support common opposition candidate Maithripala Sirisena at the presidential election. After the election newly elected President Sirisena rewarded Radhakrishnan by appointing him State Minister of Education.

Radhakrishnan was one of the United National Front for Good Governance's candidates in Nuwara Eliya District at the 2015 parliamentary election. He was elected and re-entered Parliament. After the election he was re-appointed State Minister of Education.

Radhakrishnan was elected leader of the UCPF on 6 September 2015.

== Electoral history ==
Electoral history of Velusami Radhakrishnan
Election	Constituency	Party	Alliance	Votes	Result
1999 provincial	Nuwara Eliya District	Ceylon Workers' Congress	Indian Origin People's Front		Elected
2004 provincial	Nuwara Eliya District	Ceylon Workers' Congress	United National Front	44,525	Elected
2009 provincial	Nuwara Eliya District	Ceylon Workers' Congress	United People's Freedom Alliance	18,513	Elected
2010 parliamentary	Nuwara Eliya District	Ceylon Workers' Congress	United People's Freedom Alliance	54,083	Elected
2015 parliamentary	Nuwara Eliya District	United National Party	United National Front for Good Governance	87,375	Elected
