= S. Jegadhiswaran =

Sri Lankan politician

Hon. S. Jegadhiswaran MP

Deputy Minister of National Integration
- In office 2007–2010

Member of Parliament for Nuwara Eliya District
- In office 2004–2010

Personal details
- Party: Ceylon Workers' Congress
- Other political affiliations: United People's Freedom Alliance

Shanmugan Jegadhiswaran (also spelt Shanmugam Jegatheeswaran, Sanmugan Jegadeeswaran) is a Sri Lankan politician, a former member of the Parliament of Sri Lanka and a former government minister.
