= Manjula Suraweera Arachchi =

Sri Lankan politician

Hon. Suraweera Arachchi MP

Member of Parliament for Nuwara Eliya Electoral District
- Incumbent
- Assumed office 15 November 2024
- Majority: 78,832

Personal details
- Party: National People's Power
- Profession: Politician

Manjula Suraweera Arachchi is a Sri Lankan politician. He was elected to the Sri Lankan Parliament from Nuwara Eliya Electoral District as a member of the National People's Power.
