= Sri Ranga Jeyaratnam =

Sri Lankan politician and broadcaster

Hon. Sri Ranga Jeyaratnam MP
- சிறீ ரங்கா ஜெயரத்தினம்

Member of Parliament for Nuwara Eliya District
- In office 2010–2015

Personal details
- Born: 22 January 1971 (age 55)
- Party: Citizen's Front
- Other political affiliations: United People's Freedom Alliance
- Education: University of Colombo
- Occupation: Broadcaster

Sri Ranga Jeyaratnam (Tamil: சிறீ ரங்கா ஜெயரத்தினம்; born 22 January 1971), also known J. Sri Ranga, is a Sri Lankan Tamil broadcaster, politician and former Member of Parliament.

== Early life ==
Jeyaratnam was born on 22 January 1971. He was educated at Vavuniya Tamil Madhya Maha Vidyalayam and Jaffna Hindu College. He then entered the University of Colombo where he was captain of the football team.

== Career ==
After university Jeyaratnam joined MBC Networks, presenting the Erimalai (volcano) programme on Shakthi FM. He later moved to television, presenting the Minnal (lightning) programme on Shakthi TV. This programme was very popular amongst the Up-country Tamils, particularly the youth. He is leader of the Citizen's Front (CF).

Jeyaratnam has close ties with President Mahinda Rajapaksa's family and is a close friend of his son Namal Rajapaksa.

During 2005 and 2006 Jeyaratnam and his family received several threats from unidentified persons. In November 2006, after Jeyaratnam's TV programme featured the assassination of Tamil National Alliance MP Nadarajah Raviraj, the police informed Shakthi TV that Jeyaratnam's life was in danger. On 3 February 2010 an unidentified group attacked the vehicle he was travelling in near Hatton.

Jeyaratnam contested the 2010 parliamentary election as one of the United National Front's candidates in Nuwara Eliya District and was elected to Parliament. Jeyaratnam did not contest the 2015 parliamentary election but was instead placed on the United People's Freedom Alliance's (UPFA) list of National List candidates. However, after the election he was not appointed to the National List.

== Electoral history ==
Electoral history of Sri Ranga Jeyaratnam
Election	Constituency	Party	Votes	Result
2010 parliamentary	Nuwara Eliya District	UNF	33,948	Elected
