= R. G. Wijerathna =

Sri Lankan politician

Hon. R. G. Wijerathna MP

Member of Parliament for Nuwara Eliya Electoral District
- Incumbent
- Assumed office 15 November 2024

Personal details
- Party: National People's Power
- Profession: Politician

R. G. Wijerathna is a Sri Lankan politician. He was elected to the Sri Lankan Parliament from Nuwara Eliya Electoral District as a member of the National People's Power.
