= Muthu Sivalingam =

Sri Lankan politician (1943–2022)

Hon. Muthu Sivalingam MP

Deputy Minister of Primary Industries
- Incumbent
- Assumed office 15 February 2018

Deputy Minister of Agriculture & Livestock
- In office 2001–2004

Minister of Estate Housing Infrastructure and Community Development
- In office 2007–2010

Deputy Minister of Economic Development
- In office 2010–2015

Member of Parliament for Nuwara Eliya District
- Incumbent
- Assumed office 17 August 2015
- In office 16 August 1994 – 9 February 2010

Member of Parliament for National List
- In office 2010–2015

Personal details
- Born: 20 July 1943
- Died: 23 November 2022 (aged 79)
- Party: Ceylon Workers' Congress
- Occupation: Trade unionist

Muthu Sivalingam (20 July 1943 – 23 November 2022) was a Sri Lankan politician who was a member of the Parliament of Sri Lanka and a government minister.

Sivalingam died on 23 November 2022, at the age of 79.
