= Hanguranketha Polling Division =

Hanguranketha
- Polling Division
- Coordinates: 7.128132°N 80.786005°E
- Country: Sri Lanka
- Province: Central Province, Sri Lanka
- Electoral District: Nuwara Eliya Electoral District

Area
  - Total: 229.27 km^{2} (88.52 sq mi)

Population (2012)
  - Total: 88,528
  - Density: 386/km^{2} (1,000/sq mi)
- ISO 3166 code: EC-06C

The Hanguranketha Polling Division is a Polling Division in the Nuwara Eliya Electoral District, in the Central Province, Sri Lanka.

== Presidential Election Results ==
=== Summary ===
The winner of Hanguranketha has matched the final country result 6 out of 8 times. Hence, Hanguranketha is a Weak Bellwether for Presidential Elections.

Year	Hanguranketha	Nuwara Eliya Electoral District	MAE %	Sri Lanka	MAE %
2019	SLPP	NDF	15.07%	SLPP	0.32%
2015	UPFA	NDF	16.13%	NDF	3.44%
2010	UPFA	NDF	16.83%	UPFA	4.25%
2005	UNP	UNP	14.49%	UPFA	7.35%
1999	PA	UNP	11.02%	PA	6.10%
1994	PA	PA	4.70%	PA	9.19%
1988	UNP	UNP	1.20%	UNP	8.87%
1982	UNP	UNP	2.91%	UNP	5.08%
Matches/Mean MAE	6/8	4/8	10.29%	8/8	5.57%

=== 2019 Sri Lankan Presidential Election ===
Party	Hanguranketha		Nuwara Eliya Electoral District		Sri Lanka	
Party	Votes	%	Votes	%	Votes	%
SLPP	30,999	52.50%	175,823	36.87%	6,924,255	52.25%
NDF	24,995	42.33%	277,913	58.28%	5,564,239	41.99%
Other Parties (with < 1%)	1,899	3.22%	17,237	3.61%	345,452	2.61%
NMPP	1,153	1.95%	5,891	1.24%	418,553	3.16%
Valid Votes	59,046	98.86%	476,864	98.52%	13,252,499	98.99%
Rejected Votes	680	1.14%	7,155	1.48%	135,452	1.01%
Total Polled	59,726	85.76%	484,019	85.06%	13,387,951	83.71%
Registered Electors	69,644		569,028		15,992,568	

=== 2015 Sri Lankan Presidential Election ===
Party	Hanguranketha		Nuwara Eliya Electoral District		Sri Lanka	
Party	Votes	%	Votes	%	Votes	%
UPFA	27,389	50.76%	145,339	34.06%	5,768,090	47.58%
NDF	25,645	47.53%	272,605	63.88%	6,217,162	51.28%
Other Parties (with < 1%)	922	1.71%	8,822	2.07%	138,200	1.14%
Valid Votes	53,956	98.07%	426,766	98.31%	12,123,452	98.85%
Rejected Votes	1,064	1.93%	7,329	1.69%	140,925	1.15%
Total Polled	55,020	77.44%	434,095	79.25%	12,264,377	78.69%
Registered Electors	71,053		547,766		15,585,942	

=== 2010 Sri Lankan Presidential Election ===
Party	Hanguranketha		Nuwara Eliya Electoral District		Sri Lanka	
Party	Votes	%	Votes	%	Votes	%
UPFA	29,164	61.43%	151,604	43.77%	6,015,934	57.88%
NDF	16,470	34.69%	180,604	52.14%	4,173,185	40.15%
Other Parties (with < 1%)	1,324	2.79%	10,040	2.90%	165,268	1.59%
DUNF	518	1.09%	4,134	1.19%	39,226	0.38%
Valid Votes	47,476	98.45%	346,382	98.17%	10,393,613	99.03%
Rejected Votes	748	1.55%	6,462	1.83%	101,838	0.97%
Total Polled	48,224	73.10%	352,844	75.65%	10,495,451	66.70%
Registered Electors	65,969		466,440		15,734,587	

=== 2005 Sri Lankan Presidential Election ===
Party	Hanguranketha		Nuwara Eliya Electoral District		Sri Lanka	
Party	Votes	%	Votes	%	Votes	%
UNP	27,061	55.58%	250,428	70.37%	4,706,366	48.43%
UPFA	20,725	42.56%	99,550	27.97%	4,887,152	50.29%
Other Parties (with < 1%)	905	1.86%	5,897	1.66%	123,521	1.27%
Valid Votes	48,691	98.30%	355,875	98.50%	9,717,039	98.88%
Rejected Votes	843	1.70%	5,410	1.50%	109,869	1.12%
Total Polled	49,534	78.10%	361,285	79.49%	9,826,908	69.51%
Registered Electors	63,421		454,528		14,136,979	

=== 1999 Sri Lankan Presidential Election ===
Party	Hanguranketha		Nuwara Eliya Electoral District		Sri Lanka	
Party	Votes	%	Votes	%	Votes	%
PA	29,000	58.16%	147,210	46.88%	4,312,157	51.12%
UNP	18,426	36.95%	152,836	48.68%	3,602,748	42.71%
JVP	1,572	3.15%	5,879	1.87%	343,927	4.08%
Other Parties (with < 1%)	865	1.73%	8,065	2.57%	176,679	2.09%
Valid Votes	49,863	97.15%	313,990	97.21%	8,435,754	97.69%
Rejected Votes	1,461	2.85%	8,997	2.79%	199,536	2.31%
Total Polled	51,324	88.17%	322,987	80.23%	8,635,290	72.17%
Registered Electors	58,213		402,589		11,965,536	

=== 1994 Sri Lankan Presidential Election ===
Party	Hanguranketha		Nuwara Eliya Electoral District		Sri Lanka	
Party	Votes	%	Votes	%	Votes	%
PA	22,917	52.94%	168,929	57.14%	4,709,205	62.28%
UNP	19,609	45.30%	116,928	39.55%	2,715,283	35.91%
Other Parties (with < 1%)	761	1.76%	9,773	3.31%	137,040	1.81%
Valid Votes	43,287	97.30%	295,630	96.15%	7,561,526	98.03%
Rejected Votes	1,202	2.70%	11,840	3.85%	151,706	1.97%
Total Polled	44,489	82.39%	307,470	78.19%	7,713,232	69.12%
Registered Electors	54,001		393,221		11,158,880	

=== 1988 Sri Lankan Presidential Election ===
Party	Hanguranketha		Nuwara Eliya Electoral District		Sri Lanka	
Party	Votes	%	Votes	%	Votes	%
UNP	22,748	61.27%	112,135	62.15%	2,569,199	50.43%
SLFP	14,011	37.74%	64,907	35.98%	2,289,857	44.95%
Other Parties (with < 1%)	370	1.00%	3,371	1.87%	235,701	4.63%
Valid Votes	37,129	98.47%	180,413	98.19%	5,094,754	98.24%
Rejected Votes	576	1.53%	3,320	1.81%	91,499	1.76%
Total Polled	37,705	84.55%	183,733	79.44%	5,186,256	55.87%
Registered Electors	44,596		231,278		9,283,143	

=== 1982 Sri Lankan Presidential Election ===
Party	Hanguranketha		Nuwara Eliya Electoral District		Sri Lanka	
Party	Votes	%	Votes	%	Votes	%
UNP	20,672	60.10%	109,017	63.10%	3,450,815	52.93%
SLFP	12,414	36.09%	57,093	33.05%	2,546,348	39.05%
JVP	983	2.86%	4,569	2.64%	273,428	4.19%
Other Parties (with < 1%)	329	0.96%	2,090	1.21%	249,460	3.83%
Valid Votes	34,398	98.94%	172,769	98.83%	6,520,156	98.78%
Rejected Votes	368	1.06%	2,048	1.17%	80,470	1.22%
Total Polled	34,766	87.24%	174,817	85.71%	6,600,626	80.15%
Registered Electors	39,853		203,968		8,235,358	

== Parliamentary Election Results ==
=== Summary ===
The winner of Hanguranketha has matched the final country result 5 out of 7 times. Hence, Hanguranketha is a Weak Bellwether for Parliamentary Elections.

Year	Hanguranketha	Nuwara Eliya Electoral District	MAE %	Sri Lanka	MAE %
2015	UNP	UNP	3.57%	UNP	4.91%
2010	UPFA	UPFA	4.18%	UPFA	1.96%
2004	UNP	UNP	7.64%	UPFA	11.03%
2001	UNP	UNP	7.25%	UNP	8.97%
2000	PA	PA	18.67%	PA	19.48%
1994	UNP	UNP	4.07%	PA	9.59%
1989	UNP	UNP	5.09%	UNP	11.01%
Matches/Mean MAE	5/7	5/7	7.21%	7/7	9.56%

=== 2015 Sri Lankan Parliamentary Election ===
Party	Hanguranketha		Nuwara Eliya Electoral District		Sri Lanka	
Party	Votes	%	Votes	%	Votes	%
UNP	26,404	55.19%	228,920	59.06%	5,098,916	45.77%
UPFA	19,775	41.33%	147,348	38.02%	4,732,664	42.48%
JVP	1,258	2.63%	5,590	1.44%	544,154	4.88%
Other Parties (with < 1%)	406	0.85%	5,727	1.48%	87,743	0.79%
Valid Votes	47,843	91.53%	387,585	92.12%	11,140,333	95.35%
Rejected Votes	4,391	8.40%	32,788	7.79%	516,926	4.42%
Total Polled	52,269	73.56%	420,734	78.77%	11,684,111	77.66%
Registered Electors	71,053		534,150		15,044,490	

=== 2010 Sri Lankan Parliamentary Election ===
Party	Hanguranketha		Nuwara Eliya Electoral District		Sri Lanka	
Party	Votes	%	Votes	%	Votes	%
UPFA	18,866	61.31%	149,111	56.06%	4,846,388	60.38%
UNP	10,362	33.68%	96,885	36.43%	2,357,057	29.37%
DNA	993	3.23%	3,984	1.50%	441,251	5.50%
Other Parties (with < 1%)	548	1.78%	15,982	6.01%	59,106	0.74%
Valid Votes	30,769	85.57%	265,962	87.64%	8,026,322	96.03%
Rejected Votes	5,146	14.31%	37,236	12.27%	581,465	6.96%
Total Polled	35,959	54.51%	303,470	64.94%	8,358,246	59.29%
Registered Electors	65,969		467,332		14,097,690	

=== 2004 Sri Lankan Parliamentary Election ===
Party	Hanguranketha		Nuwara Eliya Electoral District		Sri Lanka	
Party	Votes	%	Votes	%	Votes	%
UNP	25,313	57.80%	176,971	54.02%	3,486,792	37.73%
UPFA	16,962	38.73%	82,945	25.32%	4,223,126	45.70%
JHU	630	1.44%	4,454	1.36%	552,723	5.98%
UPF	574	1.31%	49,728	15.18%	49,728	0.54%
Other Parties (with < 1%)	318	0.73%	13,511	4.12%	53,563	0.58%
Valid Votes	43,797	92.15%	327,609	93.06%	9,241,931	94.52%
Rejected Votes	3,732	7.85%	24,413	6.94%	534,452	5.47%
Total Polled	47,529	76.82%	352,022	80.70%	9,777,821	75.74%
Registered Electors	61,868		436,236		12,909,631	

=== 2001 Sri Lankan Parliamentary Election ===
Party	Hanguranketha		Nuwara Eliya Electoral District		Sri Lanka	
Party	Votes	%	Votes	%	Votes	%
UNP	25,631	60.56%	215,157	68.28%	4,086,026	45.62%
PA	13,618	32.18%	77,733	24.67%	3,330,815	37.19%
JVP	2,502	5.91%	11,080	3.52%	815,353	9.10%
Other Parties (with < 1%)	570	1.35%	11,129	3.53%	143,834	1.61%
Valid Votes	42,321	89.04%	315,099	91.74%	8,955,844	94.77%
Rejected Votes	5,211	10.96%	28,373	8.26%	494,009	5.23%
Total Polled	47,532	79.16%	343,472	82.32%	9,449,878	76.03%
Registered Electors	60,044		417,264		12,428,762	

=== 2000 Sri Lankan Parliamentary Election ===
Party	Hanguranketha		Nuwara Eliya Electoral District		Sri Lanka	
Party	Votes	%	Votes	%	Votes	%
PA	32,859	72.91%	158,018	52.53%	3,899,329	45.33%
UNP	10,470	23.23%	126,486	42.05%	3,451,765	40.12%
JVP	1,386	3.08%	6,299	2.09%	518,725	6.03%
Other Parties (with < 1%)	353	0.78%	10,003	3.33%	247,240	2.87%
Valid Votes	45,068	N/A	300,806	N/A	8,602,617	N/A

=== 1994 Sri Lankan Parliamentary Election ===
Party	Hanguranketha		Nuwara Eliya Electoral District		Sri Lanka	
Party	Votes	%	Votes	%	Votes	%
UNP	24,783	57.71%	175,478	58.12%	3,498,370	44.04%
PA	17,904	41.69%	97,658	32.35%	3,887,805	48.94%
Other Parties (with < 1%)	254	0.59%	28,782	9.53%	206,815	2.60%
Valid Votes	42,941	94.44%	301,918	93.33%	7,943,688	95.20%
Rejected Votes	2,526	5.56%	21,592	6.67%	400,395	4.80%
Total Polled	45,467	84.20%	323,510	82.37%	8,344,095	74.75%
Registered Electors	54,001		392,770		11,163,064	

=== 1989 Sri Lankan Parliamentary Election ===
Party	Hanguranketha		Nuwara Eliya Electoral District		Sri Lanka	
Party	Votes	%	Votes	%	Votes	%
UNP	24,140	70.09%	109,853	63.34%	2,838,005	50.71%
SLFP	9,890	28.71%	47,128	27.18%	1,785,369	31.90%
Other Parties (with < 1%)	412	1.20%	16,443	9.48%	363,149	6.49%
Valid Votes	34,442	93.34%	173,424	92.73%	5,596,468	93.87%
Rejected Votes	2,457	6.66%	13,600	7.27%	365,563	6.13%
Total Polled	36,899	84.16%	187,024	81.49%	5,962,031	63.60%
Registered Electors	43,844		229,519		9,374,164	

== Demographics ==
=== Ethnicity ===
The Hanguranketha Polling Division has a Sinhalese majority (86.4%) . In comparison, the Nuwara Eliya Electoral District (which contains the Hanguranketha Polling Division) has an Indian Tamil majority (53.1%) and a significant Sinhalese population (39.6%)

Ethnicity in Hanguranketha
1. Sinhalese (86.4%)
2. Indian Tamil (10.0%)
3. Sri Lankan Tamil (3.50%)
4. Other (0.20%)

=== Religion ===
The Hanguranketha Polling Division has a Buddhist majority (86.2%) and a significant Hindu population (12.6%). In comparison, the Nuwara Eliya Electoral District (which contains the Hanguranketha Polling Division) has a Hindu majority (51.0%) and a significant Buddhist population (39.1%)

Religion in Hanguranketha
1. Buddhist (86.2%)
2. Hindu (12.6%)
3. Other (1.20%)
