= Krishnan Kaleichelvi =

Sri Lankan politician

Hon. Krishnan Kaleichelvi MP

Member of Parliament for Nuwara Eliya Electoral District
- Incumbent
- Assumed office 15 November 2024
- Majority: 33, 346

Personal details
- Party: National People's Power
- Profession: Politician

Krishnan Kaleichelvi is a Sri Lankan politician. She was elected to the Sri Lankan Parliament from Nuwara Eliya Electoral District as a member of the National People's Power.
