= Walapane Polling Division =

Walapane
- Polling Division
- Coordinates: 7.091562°N 80.881242°E
- Country: Sri Lanka
- Province: Central Province, Sri Lanka
- Electoral District: Nuwara Eliya Electoral District

Area
  - Total: 307.49 km^{2} (118.72 sq mi)

Population (2012)
  - Total: 104,119
  - Density: 339/km^{2} (880/sq mi)
- ISO 3166 code: EC-06D

The Walapane Polling Division is a Polling Division in the Nuwara Eliya Electoral District, in the Central Province, Sri Lanka.

== Presidential Election Results ==
=== Summary ===
The winner of Walapane has matched the final country result 5 out of 9 times. Hence, Walapane is a Weak Bellwether for Presidential Elections.

| Year | Walapane | Nuwara Eliya Electoral District | MAE % | Sri Lanka | MAE % |
|---|---|---|---|---|---|
| 2024 | SJB | SJB | | NPP | |
| 2019 | NDF | NDF | 9.30% | SLPP | 5.73% |
| 2015 | NDF | NDF | 13.06% | NDF | 0.40% |
| 2010 | UPFA | NDF | 11.37% | UPFA | 1.30% |
| 2005 | UNP | UNP | 14.53% | UPFA | 7.29% |
| 1999 | UNP | UNP | 0.52% | PA | 4.31% |
| 1994 | PA | PA | 3.35% | PA | 7.84% |
| 1988 | UNP | UNP | 7.45% | UNP | 2.81% |
| 1982 | UNP | UNP | 6.56% | UNP | 2.11% |
| Matches/Mean MAE | 5/9 | 4/9 | 8.27% | 9/9 | 3.97% |

=== 2024 Sri Lankan Presidential Election ===
| Party | Walapane | | Nuwara Eliya Electoral District | | Sri Lanka | |
|---|---|---|---|---|---|---|
| Party | Votes | % | Votes | % | Votes | % |
| SJB | 29,896 | 43.7% | 201,814 | 42.58% | 5,634,915 | 42.31% |
| NPP | 17,074 | 24.96% | 138,619 | 29.25% | 4,363,035 | 32.76% |
| Independent | 15,140 | 22.13% | 105,057 | 22.17% | 2,299,767 | 17.27% |
| Other Parties (with < 1%) | 3289 | 4.81% | 19,624 | 4.14% | 679,118 | 5.09% |
| SLPP | 3,008 | 4.4% | 8,821 | 1.86% | 342,781 | 2.57% |
| Valid Votes | 68,407 | 96.72% | 473,935 | 97% | 13,319,616 | 97.8% |
| Rejected Votes | 2,317 | 3.28% | 14,643 | 3% | 300,300 | 2.2% |
| Total Polled | 70,724 | 81.41% | 488,578 | 80.72% | 13,619,916 | 79.46% |
| Registered Electors | 86,874 | | 605,292 | | 17,140,354 | |

=== 2019 Sri Lankan Presidential Election ===
| Party | Walapane | | Nuwara Eliya Electoral District | | Sri Lanka | |
| Party | Votes | % | Votes | % | Votes | % |
|---|---|---|---|---|---|---|
| NDF | 33,908 | 48.51% | 277,913 | 58.28% | 5,564,239 | 41.99% |
| SLPP | 32,602 | 46.65% | 175,823 | 36.87% | 6,924,255 | 52.25% |
| Other Parties (with < 1%) | 2,595 | 3.71% | 17,237 | 3.61% | 345,452 | 2.61% |
| NMPP | 787 | 1.13% | 5,891 | 1.24% | 418,553 | 3.16% |
| Valid Votes | 69,892 | 98.62% | 476,864 | 98.52% | 13,252,499 | 98.99% |
| Rejected Votes | 978 | 1.38% | 7,155 | 1.48% | 135,452 | 1.01% |
| Total Polled | 70,870 | 85.81% | 484,019 | 85.06% | 13,387,951 | 83.71% |
| Registered Electors | 82,593 | | 569,028 | | 15,992,568 | |

=== 2015 Sri Lankan Presidential Election ===
| Party | Walapane | | Nuwara Eliya Electoral District | | Sri Lanka | |
| Party | Votes | % | Votes | % | Votes | % |
|---|---|---|---|---|---|---|
| NDF | 32,340 | 50.59% | 272,605 | 63.88% | 6,217,162 | 51.28% |
| UPFA | 30,354 | 47.48% | 145,339 | 34.06% | 5,768,090 | 47.58% |
| Other Parties (with < 1%) | 1,230 | 1.92% | 8,822 | 2.07% | 138,200 | 1.14% |
| Valid Votes | 63,924 | 98.38% | 426,766 | 98.31% | 12,123,452 | 98.85% |
| Rejected Votes | 1,052 | 1.62% | 7,329 | 1.69% | 140,925 | 1.15% |
| Total Polled | 64,976 | 79.05% | 434,095 | 79.25% | 12,264,377 | 78.69% |
| Registered Electors | 82,193 | | 547,766 | | 15,585,942 | |

=== 2010 Sri Lankan Presidential Election ===
| Party | Walapane | | Nuwara Eliya Electoral District | | Sri Lanka | |
| Party | Votes | % | Votes | % | Votes | % |
|---|---|---|---|---|---|---|
| UPFA | 29,618 | 55.89% | 151,604 | 43.77% | 6,015,934 | 57.88% |
| NDF | 21,474 | 40.52% | 180,604 | 52.14% | 4,173,185 | 40.15% |
| Other Parties (with < 1%) | 1,902 | 3.59% | 14,174 | 4.09% | 204,494 | 1.97% |
| Valid Votes | 52,994 | 98.38% | 346,382 | 98.17% | 10,393,613 | 99.03% |
| Rejected Votes | 875 | 1.62% | 6,462 | 1.83% | 101,838 | 0.97% |
| Total Polled | 53,869 | 73.42% | 352,844 | 75.65% | 10,495,451 | 66.70% |
| Registered Electors | 73,369 | | 466,440 | | 15,734,587 | |

=== 2005 Sri Lankan Presidential Election ===
| Party | Walapane | | Nuwara Eliya Electoral District | | Sri Lanka | |
| Party | Votes | % | Votes | % | Votes | % |
|---|---|---|---|---|---|---|
| UNP | 30,852 | 55.57% | 250,428 | 70.37% | 4,706,366 | 48.43% |
| UPFA | 23,688 | 42.67% | 99,550 | 27.97% | 4,887,152 | 50.29% |
| Other Parties (with < 1%) | 979 | 1.76% | 5,897 | 1.66% | 123,521 | 1.27% |
| Valid Votes | 55,519 | 98.23% | 355,875 | 98.50% | 9,717,039 | 98.88% |
| Rejected Votes | 1,003 | 1.77% | 5,410 | 1.50% | 109,869 | 1.12% |
| Total Polled | 56,522 | 78.78% | 361,285 | 79.49% | 9,826,908 | 69.51% |
| Registered Electors | 71,744 | | 454,528 | | 14,136,979 | |

=== 1999 Sri Lankan Presidential Election ===
| Party | Walapane | | Nuwara Eliya Electoral District | | Sri Lanka | |
| Party | Votes | % | Votes | % | Votes | % |
|---|---|---|---|---|---|---|
| UNP | 23,685 | 47.92% | 152,836 | 48.68% | 3,602,748 | 42.71% |
| PA | 23,312 | 47.17% | 147,210 | 46.88% | 4,312,157 | 51.12% |
| JVP | 1,299 | 2.63% | 5,879 | 1.87% | 343,927 | 4.08% |
| Other Parties (with < 1%) | 1,125 | 2.28% | 8,065 | 2.57% | 176,679 | 2.09% |
| Valid Votes | 49,421 | 97.31% | 313,990 | 97.21% | 8,435,754 | 97.69% |
| Rejected Votes | 1,366 | 2.69% | 8,997 | 2.79% | 199,536 | 2.31% |
| Total Polled | 50,787 | 79.20% | 322,987 | 80.23% | 8,635,290 | 72.17% |
| Registered Electors | 64,127 | | 402,589 | | 11,965,536 | |

=== 1994 Sri Lankan Presidential Election ===
| Party | Walapane | | Nuwara Eliya Electoral District | | Sri Lanka | |
| Party | Votes | % | Votes | % | Votes | % |
|---|---|---|---|---|---|---|
| PA | 26,020 | 54.12% | 168,929 | 57.14% | 4,709,205 | 62.28% |
| UNP | 20,955 | 43.59% | 116,928 | 39.55% | 2,715,283 | 35.91% |
| Other Parties (with < 1%) | 594 | 1.24% | 3,459 | 1.17% | 78,152 | 1.03% |
| Ind 2 | 509 | 1.06% | 6,314 | 2.14% | 58,888 | 0.78% |
| Valid Votes | 48,078 | 97.01% | 295,630 | 96.15% | 7,561,526 | 98.03% |
| Rejected Votes | 1,480 | 2.99% | 11,840 | 3.85% | 151,706 | 1.97% |
| Total Polled | 49,558 | 78.66% | 307,470 | 78.19% | 7,713,232 | 69.12% |
| Registered Electors | 63,000 | | 393,221 | | 11,158,880 | |

=== 1988 Sri Lankan Presidential Election ===
| Party | Walapane | | Nuwara Eliya Electoral District | | Sri Lanka | |
| Party | Votes | % | Votes | % | Votes | % |
|---|---|---|---|---|---|---|
| UNP | 18,099 | 54.81% | 112,135 | 62.15% | 2,569,199 | 50.43% |
| SLFP | 14,519 | 43.97% | 64,907 | 35.98% | 2,289,857 | 44.95% |
| SLMP | 404 | 1.22% | 3,371 | 1.87% | 235,701 | 4.63% |
| Valid Votes | 33,022 | 98.42% | 180,413 | 98.19% | 5,094,754 | 98.24% |
| Rejected Votes | 530 | 1.58% | 3,320 | 1.81% | 91,499 | 1.76% |
| Total Polled | 33,552 | 75.89% | 183,733 | 79.44% | 5,186,256 | 55.87% |
| Registered Electors | 44,214 | | 231,278 | | 9,283,143 | |

=== 1982 Sri Lankan Presidential Election ===
| Party | Walapane | | Nuwara Eliya Electoral District | | Sri Lanka | |
| Party | Votes | % | Votes | % | Votes | % |
|---|---|---|---|---|---|---|
| UNP | 18,957 | 56.21% | 109,017 | 63.10% | 3,450,815 | 52.93% |
| SLFP | 13,391 | 39.71% | 57,093 | 33.05% | 2,546,348 | 39.05% |
| JVP | 1,023 | 3.03% | 4,569 | 2.64% | 273,428 | 4.19% |
| Other Parties (with < 1%) | 352 | 1.04% | 2,090 | 1.21% | 249,460 | 3.83% |
| Valid Votes | 33,723 | 98.84% | 172,769 | 98.83% | 6,520,156 | 98.78% |
| Rejected Votes | 397 | 1.16% | 2,048 | 1.17% | 80,470 | 1.22% |
| Total Polled | 34,120 | 88.82% | 174,817 | 85.71% | 6,600,626 | 80.15% |
| Registered Electors | 38,414 | | 203,968 | | 8,235,358 | |

== Parliamentary Election Results ==
=== Summary ===
The winner of Walapane has matched the final country result 5 out of 7 times. Hence, Walapane is a Weak Bellwether for Parliamentary Elections.

| Year | Walapane | Nuwara Eliya Electoral District | MAE % | Sri Lanka | MAE % |
|---|---|---|---|---|---|
| 2015 | UNP | UNP | 4.69% | UNP | 4.46% |
| 2010 | UPFA | UPFA | 8.34% | UPFA | 3.69% |
| 2004 | UNP | UNP | 9.68% | UPFA | 5.31% |
| 2001 | UNP | UNP | 12.64% | UNP | 5.20% |
| 2000 | PA | PA | 1.69% | PA | 4.75% |
| 1994 | UNP | UNP | 6.74% | PA | 6.99% |
| 1989 | UNP | UNP | 2.64% | UNP | 6.77% |
| Matches/Mean MAE | 5/7 | 5/7 | 6.63% | 7/7 | 5.31% |

=== 2015 Sri Lankan Parliamentary Election ===
| Party | Walapane | | Nuwara Eliya Electoral District | | Sri Lanka | |
| Party | Votes | % | Votes | % | Votes | % |
|---|---|---|---|---|---|---|
| UNP | 30,753 | 54.46% | 228,920 | 59.06% | 5,098,916 | 45.77% |
| UPFA | 24,387 | 43.19% | 147,348 | 38.02% | 4,732,664 | 42.48% |
| JVP | 664 | 1.18% | 5,590 | 1.44% | 544,154 | 4.88% |
| Other Parties (with < 1%) | 663 | 1.17% | 5,727 | 1.48% | 87,743 | 0.79% |
| Valid Votes | 56,467 | 91.01% | 387,585 | 92.12% | 11,140,333 | 95.35% |
| Rejected Votes | 5,539 | 8.93% | 32,788 | 7.79% | 516,926 | 4.42% |
| Total Polled | 62,047 | 75.49% | 420,734 | 78.77% | 11,684,111 | 77.66% |
| Registered Electors | 82,193 | | 534,150 | | 15,044,490 | |

=== 2010 Sri Lankan Parliamentary Election ===
| Party | Walapane | | Nuwara Eliya Electoral District | | Sri Lanka | |
| Party | Votes | % | Votes | % | Votes | % |
|---|---|---|---|---|---|---|
| UPFA | 26,017 | 66.08% | 149,111 | 56.06% | 4,846,388 | 60.38% |
| UNP | 11,551 | 29.34% | 96,885 | 36.43% | 2,357,057 | 29.37% |
| UPF | 881 | 2.24% | 13,189 | 4.96% | 24,670 | 0.31% |
| DNA | 508 | 1.29% | 3,984 | 1.50% | 441,251 | 5.50% |
| Other Parties (with < 1%) | 413 | 1.05% | 2,793 | 1.05% | 34,436 | 0.43% |
| Valid Votes | 39,370 | 85.89% | 265,962 | 87.64% | 8,026,322 | 96.03% |
| Rejected Votes | 6,424 | 14.01% | 37,236 | 12.27% | 581,465 | 6.96% |
| Total Polled | 45,840 | 62.48% | 303,470 | 64.94% | 8,358,246 | 59.29% |
| Registered Electors | 73,369 | | 467,332 | | 14,097,690 | |

=== 2004 Sri Lankan Parliamentary Election ===
| Party | Walapane | | Nuwara Eliya Electoral District | | Sri Lanka | |
| Party | Votes | % | Votes | % | Votes | % |
|---|---|---|---|---|---|---|
| UNP | 22,768 | 46.38% | 176,971 | 54.02% | 3,486,792 | 37.73% |
| UPFA | 20,607 | 41.98% | 82,945 | 25.32% | 4,223,126 | 45.70% |
| UPF | 3,170 | 6.46% | 49,728 | 15.18% | 49,728 | 0.54% |
| CDUA | 1,697 | 3.46% | 10,736 | 3.28% | 10,736 | 0.12% |
| Other Parties (with < 1%) | 849 | 1.73% | 7,229 | 2.21% | 595,550 | 6.44% |
| Valid Votes | 49,091 | 92.42% | 327,609 | 93.06% | 9,241,931 | 94.52% |
| Rejected Votes | 4,028 | 7.58% | 24,413 | 6.94% | 534,452 | 5.47% |
| Total Polled | 53,119 | 76.09% | 352,022 | 80.70% | 9,777,821 | 75.74% |
| Registered Electors | 69,813 | | 436,236 | | 12,909,631 | |

=== 2001 Sri Lankan Parliamentary Election ===
| Party | Walapane | | Nuwara Eliya Electoral District | | Sri Lanka | |
| Party | Votes | % | Votes | % | Votes | % |
|---|---|---|---|---|---|---|
| UNP | 26,431 | 54.93% | 215,157 | 68.28% | 4,086,026 | 45.62% |
| PA | 18,582 | 38.62% | 77,733 | 24.67% | 3,330,815 | 37.19% |
| JVP | 2,184 | 4.54% | 11,080 | 3.52% | 815,353 | 9.10% |
| Other Parties (with < 1%) | 918 | 1.91% | 11,129 | 3.53% | 143,834 | 1.61% |
| Valid Votes | 48,115 | 90.02% | 315,099 | 91.74% | 8,955,844 | 94.77% |
| Rejected Votes | 5,335 | 9.98% | 28,373 | 8.26% | 494,009 | 5.23% |
| Total Polled | 53,450 | 80.17% | 343,472 | 82.32% | 9,449,878 | 76.03% |
| Registered Electors | 66,671 | | 417,264 | | 12,428,762 | |

=== 2000 Sri Lankan Parliamentary Election ===
| Party | Walapane | | Nuwara Eliya Electoral District | | Sri Lanka | |
| Party | Votes | % | Votes | % | Votes | % |
|---|---|---|---|---|---|---|
| PA | 24,390 | 51.40% | 158,018 | 52.53% | 3,899,329 | 45.33% |
| UNP | 21,144 | 44.56% | 126,486 | 42.05% | 3,451,765 | 40.12% |
| JVP | 1,290 | 2.72% | 6,299 | 2.09% | 518,725 | 6.03% |
| Other Parties (with < 1%) | 628 | 1.32% | 10,003 | 3.33% | 247,240 | 2.87% |
| Valid Votes | 47,452 | N/A | 300,806 | N/A | 8,602,617 | N/A |

=== 1994 Sri Lankan Parliamentary Election ===
| Party | Walapane | | Nuwara Eliya Electoral District | | Sri Lanka | |
| Party | Votes | % | Votes | % | Votes | % |
|---|---|---|---|---|---|---|
| UNP | 26,534 | 53.75% | 175,478 | 58.12% | 3,498,370 | 44.04% |
| PA | 21,453 | 43.46% | 97,658 | 32.35% | 3,887,805 | 48.94% |
| IND1 | 1,189 | 2.41% | 27,374 | 9.07% | 48,199 | 0.61% |
| Other Parties (with < 1%) | 187 | 0.38% | 1,408 | 0.47% | 158,616 | 2.00% |
| Valid Votes | 49,363 | 94.28% | 301,918 | 93.33% | 7,943,688 | 95.20% |
| Rejected Votes | 2,997 | 5.72% | 21,592 | 6.67% | 400,395 | 4.80% |
| Total Polled | 52,360 | 83.11% | 323,510 | 82.37% | 8,344,095 | 74.75% |
| Registered Electors | 63,000 | | 392,770 | | 11,163,064 | |

=== 1989 Sri Lankan Parliamentary Election ===
| Party | Walapane | | Nuwara Eliya Electoral District | | Sri Lanka | |
| Party | Votes | % | Votes | % | Votes | % |
|---|---|---|---|---|---|---|
| UNP | 20,699 | 62.44% | 109,853 | 63.34% | 2,838,005 | 50.71% |
| SLFP | 11,236 | 33.90% | 47,128 | 27.18% | 1,785,369 | 31.90% |
| DPLF | 961 | 2.90% | 10,509 | 6.06% | 19,150 | 0.34% |
| Other Parties (with < 1%) | 252 | 0.76% | 5,934 | 3.42% | 343,999 | 6.15% |
| Valid Votes | 33,148 | 92.50% | 173,424 | 92.73% | 5,596,468 | 93.87% |
| Rejected Votes | 2,687 | 7.50% | 13,600 | 7.27% | 365,563 | 6.13% |
| Total Polled | 35,835 | 82.15% | 187,024 | 81.49% | 5,962,031 | 63.60% |
| Registered Electors | 43,624 | | 229,519 | | 9,374,164 | |

== Demographics ==
=== Ethnicity ===
The Walapane Polling Division has a Sinhalese majority (63.0%) and a significant Indian Tamil population (33.8%) . In comparison, the Nuwara Eliya Electoral District (which contains the Walapane Polling Division) has an Indian Tamil majority (53.1%) and a significant Sinhalese population (39.6%)

Ethnicity in Walapane
1. Sinhalese (63.0%)
2. Indian Tamil (33.8%)
3. Sri Lankan Tamil (2.40%)
4. Other (0.80%)

=== Religion ===
The Walapane Polling Division has a Buddhist majority (62.7%) and a significant Hindu population (33.1%) . In comparison, the Nuwara Eliya Electoral District (which contains the Walapane Polling Division) has a Hindu majority (51.0%) and a significant Buddhist population (39.1%)

Religion in Walapane
1. Buddhist (62.7%)
2. Hindu (33.1%)
3. Roman Catholic (1.60%)
4. Other Christian (1.60%)
5. Other (1.00%)
