= P. Chandrasekaran =

Sri Lankan politician

Hon. P. Chandrasekaran
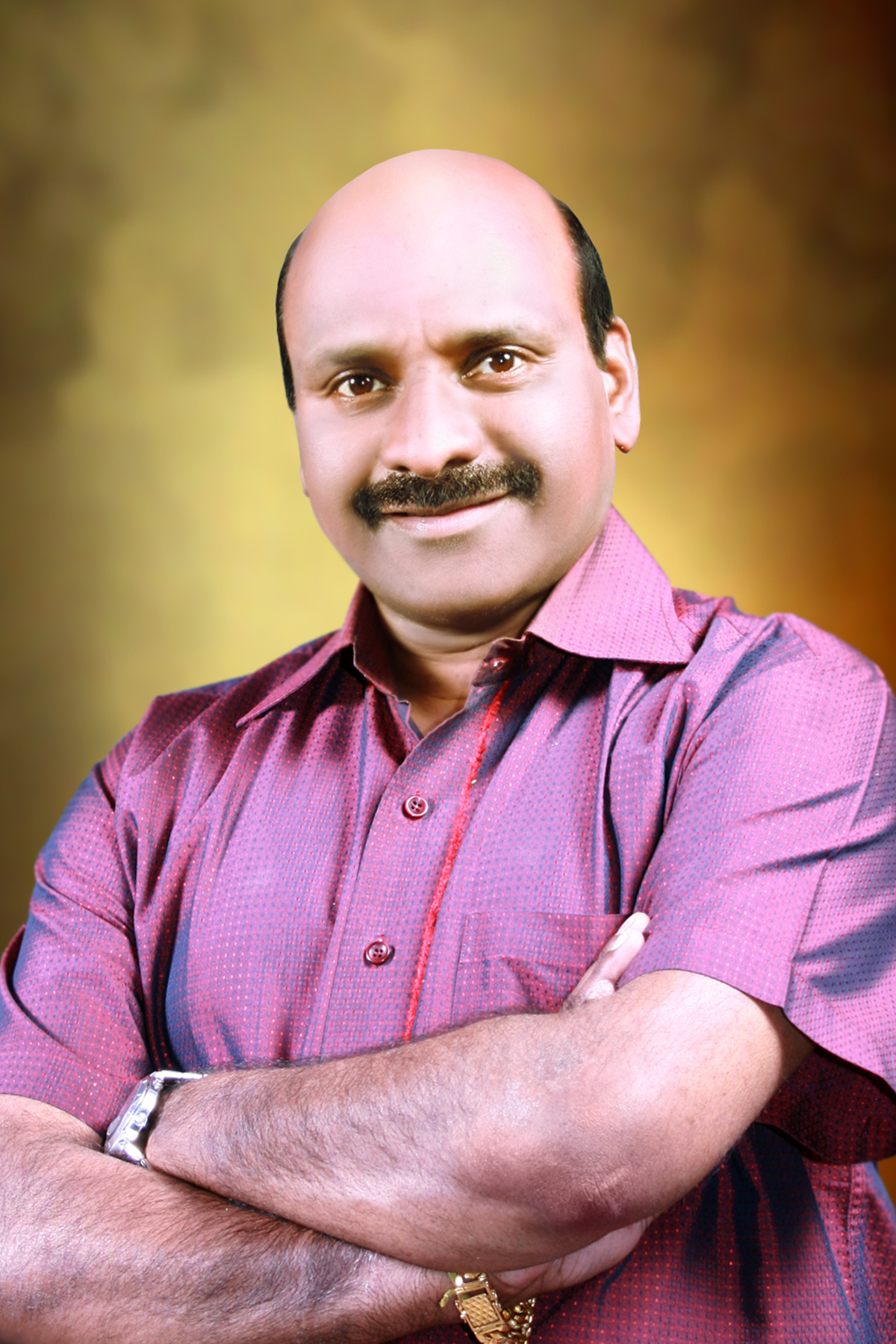

Member of Parliament for Nuwara Eliya
- In office 1994–2010
- Succeeded by: Santhanam Arulsamy

Member of the Central Provincial Council
- In office 1993–1994

Personal details
- Born: 17 April 1957 Talawakelle, Ceylon
- Died: 1 January 2010 (aged 52) Colombo, Sri Lanka
- Party: Up-Country People's Front
- Other political affiliations: United People's Freedom Alliance
- Children: Anusha Chandrasekaran
- Occupation: Trade unionist

Periyasamy Chandrasekaran (Tamil: பெரியசாமி சந்திரசேகரன்; 17 April 1957 – 1 January 2010) was a Sri Lankan trade unionist, politician and government minister.

== Early life and family ==
Chandrasekaran was born on 17 April 1957 in Talawakelle in central Ceylon. He was educated at Sumana Demala Maha Vidyalayam, Talawakelle, St. Patrick's Vidyalayam, Talawakelle and Highlands College, Hatton. Following the death of his father he gave up his education to support his family.

Chandrasekaran was married Shanthini Devi. They had two daughters.

== Career ==
Chandrasekaran became interested in politics at a young age and wrote articles in Tamil newspapers. He joined the Ceylon Workers' Congress (CWC), becoming its vice-president in 1977. He was elected to the Talawakele Lindula Urban Council in 1982, Nuwara Eliya District Development Council in 1985 and Nuwara Eliya Divisional Council in 1987. He left the CWC in 1989 and formed the Up-Country People's Front (UCPF).

Chandrasekaran was one of the Democratic People's Liberation Front's (DPLF) candidates in Nuwara Eliya District at the 1989 parliamentary election but the DPLF failed to win any seats in Parliament. He was arrested in 1990. The draconian Prevention of Terrorism Act was used to arrest him 1993. He was elected to the Central Provincial Council whilst in custody.

Chandrasekaran was one of the UCPF's candidates for Nuwara Eliya District at the 1994 parliamentary election. He was elected and entered Parliament. He was re-elected at the 2000, 2001 and 2004 parliamentary elections.

After being elected to Parliament in 1994 he supported the new People's Alliance government. He held several ministerial appointments thereafter: Deputy Minister of Trade and Commerce (1994); Deputy Minister of Estate Housing (1994–99); Project Minister of Estate Infrastructure (2001); Minister of Community Development; Deputy Minister of Irrigation and Water Management (2001–04); and Minister of Community Development and Social Inequity Eradication (2007–10).

Chandrasekaran, who was at his home in Rajagiriya, failed to wake up on the morning of 1 January 2010. He was taken to the private Nawaloka Hospital where he was pronounced dead on admission.

== Electoral history ==
Electoral history of P. Chandrasekaran
| Election | Constituency | Party | Alliance | Votes | Result |
|---|---|---|---|---|---|
| 1989 parliamentary | Nuwara Eliya | UCPF | DPLF | 1,364 | Not elected |
| 1993 provincial | | | | | Elected |
| 1994 parliamentary | Nuwara Eliya | UCPF | Ind | 23,453 | Elected |
| 2000 parliamentary | Nuwara Eliya | UCPF | UNP | 54,681 | Elected |
| 2001 parliamentary | Nuwara Eliya | UCPF | UNF | 121,421 | Elected |
| 2004 parliamentary | Nuwara Eliya | UCPF | | 42,582 | Elected |
