= Tamil Progressive Alliance =

Tamil Progressive Alliance தமிழ் முற்போக்கு கூட்டணி
- Secretary-General: A. Lawrence
- Leader: Mano Ganesan
- Deputy Leaders: Palani Digambaran; Velusami Radhakrishnan
- Founded: 3 June 2015 (11 years ago)
- Ideology: Indian Tamil interests
- National affiliation: Samagi Jana Balawegaya
- Parliament: 3 / 225
- Local Government: 08 / 7,842

Election symbol
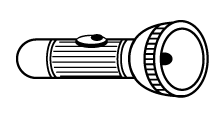
- Torch

The Tamil Progressive Alliance (TPF; Tamil: தமிழ் முற்போக்கு கூட்டணி Tamiḻ Muṟpōkku Kūṭṭaṇi) is a Sri Lankan political alliance. It was formed in 2015 by the Democratic People's Front (DPF), National Union of Workers (NUW) and the Up-Country People's Front (UCPF) to represent the 1.5 million Tamils, mostly Indian Tamils, living outside the Northern and Eastern provinces.

== History ==
On 3 June 2015 a Memorandum of Understanding was signed by Mano Ganesan, Palani Digambaran and Velusami Radhakrishnan, leaders of the DPF, NUW and UPCF respectively, at the Taj Samudra hotel in Colombo. Ganesan was appointed leader of the TPF whilst Digambaran and Radhakrishnan were appointed deputy leaders. A. Lawrence, the secretary of the UCPF, was appointed general-secretary of the TPF.

Although the alliance was focusing on issues affecting Tamil people, particularly Indian Tamils, it would also serve Sinhalese and Muslims. The Ceylon Workers' Congress, the largest political party representing Indian Tamils was excluded from the alliance. The alliance would not contest elections but would fight for the political rights of Tamils.

On 5 June 2014 the three members of the alliance announced that they would contest the then upcoming 2015 Sri Lankan parliamentary election in alliance with the United National Party.

== Electoral history ==
Sri Lanka Parliamentary Elections
Election year	Votes	Vote %	Seats won	+/–	Result for the party
2015	Part of UNFGG		6 / 225	▲6	Government
2020	Part of SJB		6 / 225	Steady	Opposition
2024	Part of SJB		3 / 225	▼3	Opposition

== See also ==
- Tamil political parties in Sri Lanka
