= S. B. Dissanayake =

Sri Lankan politician

Hon. S. B. Dissanayake
- සුමනවීර බණ්ඩා දිසානායක சுமனவீர பண்டா திசாநாயக்க

Minister of Industry
- Incumbent
- Assumed office 3 March 2022
- President: Gotabaya Rajapaksa
- Prime Minister: Mahinda Rajapaksa

Minister of Rural and Economic Affairs
- In office 4 September 2015 – 12 April 2018
- President: Maithripala Sirisena
- Prime Minister: Ranil Wickremesinghe

Member of Parliament for National List
- In office 2015–2020

Member of Parliament for Kandy District
- Incumbent
- Assumed office 2020
- In office 2010–2015

Personal details
- Born: 18 September 1951 (age 74)
- Party: Sri Lanka Freedom Party
- Other political affiliations: Communist Party; United National Party
- Spouse: Thamara née Samarakoon
- Children: Narada, Tharaka
- Education: University of Sri Jayewardenepura
- Occupation: Politics

Dissanayake Mudiyanselage Sumanaweera Banda Dissanayake, MP (born 18 September 1951) (known as S. B. Dissanayake) is a Sri Lankan politician. He is the former Cabinet Minister of Higher Education in President Mahinda Rajapakse's Government. He was the former general secretary of Sri Lanka Freedom Party and former national organiser of the United National Party. Dissanayake lost his cabinet position after Rajapaksha was defeated at the 2015 presidential election in Sri Lanka.

He was appointed as Minister of Industry by President Gotabaya Rajapaksa in 2022.

== Political career ==
In the 1977 General Elections Dissanayake contested the Hanguranketha Electorate from the Communist Party but was defeated. Dissanayaka contested for the parliamentary election in 1994 under the People's Alliance from the Nuwara Eliya district and was elected to parliament with 38372 votes. He served as the Cabinet Minister of Samurdhi affairs, Youth Affairs and Sports under President Chandrika Kumaratunga. In 2001, Dissanayaka and other eight ministers from the PA government crossed over to the United National Party which was a crucial factor in the downfall of the incumbent PA government.In 2002 he was assigned as the Cabinet Minister of Samurdhi and Agriculture in the UNP government under prime minister Ranil Wickramasinghe in addition to being elevated to National Organiser of the party. In December 2009, Dissanayaka crossed over again, to the SLFP.Dissanayake lost his cabinet position after Rajapaksha was defeated at the 2015 presidential election in Sri Lanka. His controversial statement about former president Chandrika Kumaratunge was criticized by many in the run up to the polls in 2015.

Dissanayake joined the National government in 2015 led by the United National Party as the Minister of Rural Economic Affairs.

He was appointed as Minister of Industry by President Gotabaya Rajapaksa on 3 March 2022.

== Controversies ==
=== Imprisonment ===
Dissanayake was sentenced to two years rigorous imprisonment by five Judge Supreme Court Bench headed by Chief Justice Sarath N. Silva on 7 December 2004 for defaming the Supreme Court during a speech he made at a function in Habaraduwa in the year 2003. In February 2006, he was fully released by the President Mahinda Rajapaksa.

=== Harassment allegations ===
In 2000, former Sri Lankan sprint athlete Susanthika Jayasinghe alleged during a live segment on Lasantha Wickrematunge's show that Dissanayaka had attempted to sexually harass her. Later, Jayasinghe claimed that she did not specifically name or accuse Dissanayaka.

== See also ==
- Cabinet of Sri Lanka
