= Nimal Piyatissa =

Sri Lankan politician

Hon. Nimal Piyatissa MP
- නිමල් පියතිස්ස நிமல் பியதிஸ்ஸ

Member of the Parliament of Sri Lanka
- Incumbent
- Assumed office 2020
- Constituency: Nuwara Eliya District

Member of the Central Provincial Council
- In office 2013–2018
- Constituency: Bonus Seat

Member of the Central Provincial Council
- In office 2004–2013
- Constituency: Nuwara Eliya District

Personal details
- Born: Opanayake Nimal Piyatissa; 5 January 1968 (age 58)
- Party: National Freedom Front (since 2008); Janatha Vimukthi Peramuna (before 2008)
- Other political affiliations: Supreme Lanka Coalition (since 2022); Sri Lanka People's Freedom Alliance (2019–2022); United People's Freedom Alliance (2004–2019)

Opanayake Nimal Piyatissa (born 5 January 1968) is a Sri Lankan politician, former provincial minister and Member of Parliament.

Piyatissa was born on 5 January 1968. He was previously a member of the Janatha Vimukthi Peramuna but is currently a member of the National Freedom Front.

Piyatissa was a member of Walapane Divisional Council and the Central Provincial Council where he held a provincial ministerial portfolio. He contested the 2020 parliamentary election as a Sri Lanka People's Freedom Alliance electoral alliance candidate in Nuwara Eliya District and was elected to the Parliament of Sri Lanka.

Electoral history of Nimal Piyatissa
Election	Constituency	Party	Alliance	Votes	Result
1999 provincial	Nuwara Eliya District	Janatha Vimukthi Peramuna		205	Not elected
2004 provincial	Nuwara Eliya District	Janatha Vimukthi Peramuna	United People's Freedom Alliance	17,111	Elected
2009 provincial	Nuwara Eliya District	National Freedom Front	United People's Freedom Alliance	19,961	Elected
2013 provincial	Nuwara Eliya District	National Freedom Front	United People's Freedom Alliance	24,109	Not elected
2020 parliamentary	Nuwara Eliya District	National Freedom Front	Sri Lanka People's Freedom Alliance	51,225	Elected
