= S. H. Nimal Kumar =

National Secretary of the Sri Lanka Red Cross

S. H. Nimal Kumar is the National Secretary of the Sri Lanka Red Cross. He was elected to chair the Disaster Management and Relief Committee of the International Federation of Red Cross and Red Crescent Societies at its general assembly held in Seoul, South Korea, recently.

== Biography ==
S. H. Nimal Kumar is a native of Trincomalee and born to the parents of Sinhala and Tamil.

== Career ==
He Started as PHI in Trincomalee. after serving few years, He is works with INGO's and NGO's. S. H. Nimal Kumar has been elected to chair the Disaster Management and Relief Committee of the International Federation of Red Cross and Red Crescents Societies for a four-year period till 2009 for the first time in its history of the Sri Lanka Red Cross Society(SLRCS). The Disaster Management and Relief Committee comprises eight members elected from 183 national societies and is functioning as a unit in the headquarters of the Federation of Red Cross and Red Crescent Societies which is located in Geneva.

Nimal Kumar noted his appointment to the chair - "We are indeed proud of this as this is an international recognition for the services rendered by the SLRCS over the years to the vulnerable,"

"I consider it a privilege to head this committee for a period of four years, which will enable me to serve the Red Cross Movement internationally. The Committee meets every three months and is responsible for policymaking, strategy planning, evaluation and monitoring pertaining to disaster management worldwide. In short, the committee functions as advisory body to the governing board of the International Federation," Nimal Kumar added who was elected uncontested to serve a second term as the National Secretary of the Sri Lanka Red Cross Society.

Mr. Kumar said in statement - The Red Cross activities in the island were at an ebb due to various reasons during the period of 1990s which had been described by many as a 'dark period', he said. "After becoming National Secretary of the SLRCS in 2002, one of our main tasks was to establish good relationships with the funding sources as well as various National Societies around the world. During my first term, the donors through SLRCS implemented many projects including flood relief, drought relief, and psychosocial support, health programme in the conflict areas as well as in other parts of the island.

He also added - "This bore results for, when the tsunami hit the coastal belt on 26 December 2004, we had the capacity and responded immediately and effectively. The International Federation, ICRC and various National Societies assisted us immensely. More than 30 national societies sent their teams to assist the affected and support us. To ensure the effective relief operation a Movement Platform was formed immediately, comprising ICRC, IFRC and participating National Societies and headed by SLRCS."
