= Up-Country People's Front =

- Leader: Velusami Radhakrishnan
- Secretary-General: S. Vijesandiran
- Founder: P. Chandrasekaran
- Founded: 1989
- Headquarters: No. 88/2, CWF Building, Dunbar Road, Hatton
- Youth wing: Up-Country Youth Front
- National affiliation: Samagi Jana Balawegaya
- Regional affiliation: Tamil Progressive Alliance
- Colors: Red; Black
- Parliament of Sri Lanka: 1 / 225
- Local Government: 4 / 7,842

Election symbol
- Mammoty

The Up-Country People's Front is a political party in Sri Lanka. It is part of the Tamil Progressive Alliance.

== History ==
The party was established in 1989. P. Chandrasekaran was the party founder, who died in 2010.

At the 2004 parliamentary elections, the party won 0.5% of the popular vote and 2 out of 225 seats. One was an elected seat and the second member of parliament was appointed through the national list of the United National Party.
