= National Union of Workers (Sri Lanka) =

National Union of Workers தொழிலாளர் தேசிய சங்கம் කම්කරු ජාතික සංගමය
- Leader: Palani Digambaran
- General Secretary: S. Philip
- Financial Secretary: J. M. Sebastian
- Founders: V. K. Vellayan; C. V. Veluppillai
- Founded: 1 May 1965; 61 years ago
- Headquarters: 187, Dimbulla Road, Hatton
- Membership: 500.000
- National affiliation: Samagi Jana Balawegaya
- Regional affiliation: Tamil Progressive Alliance
- Parliament of Sri Lanka: 1 / 225

The National Union of Workers (NUW) (Tamil: தொழிலாளர் தேசிய சங்கம், romanized: Toḻilāḷar Tēciya Caṅkam; Sinhala: කම්කරු ජාතික සංගමය, romanized: Kamkaru Jātika Saṁgamaya) is an active trade union representing workers in the tea plantations of Sri Lanka. The NUW was established in 1965 by V. K. Vellayan, a leader known for his effective mobilisation of the plantation labour force.

In its early years, V. K. Vellayan, also known as "VK," was recognised as a people's leader. He built the NUW by drawing leaders from the tea estates, shaping them into effective trade unionists. Some of the notable leaders who emerged under his guidance include P.V. Kandiah (PVK), Aiyadorai (known as Muttalai Rohini), Perumal, and Punniya Moorthi. VK mentored them in trade union politics, leadership, and management, ensuring a strong line of succession within the union.

Under VK's leadership, the NUW grew to become one of the leading trade unions in Sri Lanka, boasting nearly 500,000 members. It played a key role in the labour movement within the tea plantations. VK notably identified the distinction between the Employment Provident Fund (EPF) and service gratuity and successfully brought this issue before the Supreme Court, winning a landmark case in favour of the workers.

After VK's era, the NUW experienced a decline in membership. During this period, P. Thigambaram was elected as the union's president. He was later elected to the Central Provincial Council from the Nuwara Eliya District, with M. Udayakumar serving as vice president.

In the 2010 parliamentary elections, P. Thigambaram was elected to the Parliament of Sri Lanka from the Nuwara Eliya District. In the 2015 General Election, he was re-elected with an overwhelming majority, and inducted as a Cabinet Minister, where his advocacy for the plantation community gained recognition, especially among youth and social activists.
