= Electoral history of Maithripala Sirisena =

List of elections featuring Maithripala Sirisena as a candidate

Maithripala Sirisena, 7th President of Sri Lanka (2015–2019); Member of the Sri Lankan Parliament from Polonnaruwa (1989–2015) (2020–Present).

== Sri Lankan Parliarment ==
=== 1989 Parliamentary General Election ===
Results of the 9th parliamentary election held on 15 February 1989 for the district of Polonnaruwa:

Party	Votes per Polling Division			Postal Votes	Total Votes	%	Seats
Party	Mediri- giriya	Minne -riya	Polon- naruwa	Postal Votes	Total Votes	%	Seats
United National Party	8,631	10,576	23,469	797	43,473	62.33%	4
Sri Lanka Freedom Party	3,384	7,431	11,973	433	23,221	33.29%	1
United Lanka People's Party	148	711	1,052	22	1,933	2.77%	0
United Socialist Alliance (CPSL, LSSP, NSSP, SLMP)	67	765	250	35	1,117	1.60%	0
Valid Votes	12,230	19,483	36,744	1,287	69,744	100.00%	5
Rejected Votes	959	1,866	2,376	65	5,266		
Total Polled	13,189	21,349	39,120	1,352	75,010		
Registered Electors	48,477	49,700	64,163	1,405	163,745		
Turnout	27.21%	42.96%	60.97%	96.23%	45.81%		

The following candidates were elected: Hewa Gajaman Paththinige Nelson (UNP), 18,093 preference votes (pv); Maithripala Sirisena (SLFP), 13,652 pv; Seid Ahamed Abdul Majeed (UNP), 12,299 pv; C. A. Suriyaarachchi (UNP), 11,318 pv; and Samarasinghe Arachchilage Muthubanda (UNP), 10,336 pv.

=== 1994 Parliamentary General Election ===
Results of the 10th parliamentary election held on 16 August 1994 for the district of Polonnaruwa:

Party	Votes per Polling Division			Postal Votes	Total Votes	%	Seats
Party	Mediri- giriya	Minne -riya	Polon- naruwa	Postal Votes	Total Votes	%	Seats
People's Alliance (SLFP et al.)	22,287	24,660	33,381	2,110	82,438	51.18%	3
United National Party	22,261	20,379	32,562	1,504	76,706	47.62%	2
Sri Lanka Progressive Front (JVP)	308	811	750	65	1,934	1.20%	0
Valid Votes	44,856	45,850	66,693	3,679	161,078	100.00%	5
Rejected Votes	1,626	1,758	2,984	66	6,434		
Total Polled	46,482	47,608	69,677	3,745	167,512		
Registered Electors	55,264	57,393	87,535		200,192		
Turnout	84.11%	82.95%	79.60%		83.68%		

The following candidates were elected: Maithripala Sirisena (PA), 62,925 preference votes (pv); Rukman Senanayake (UNP), 45,648 pv; Hewa Gajaman Paththinige Nelson (UNP), 39,439 pv; Thilakarathne Bandara Mahalekam (PA), 26,465 pv; and Herath Mudiyanselage Nandasena Herath (PA), 26,213 pv.

=== 2000 Parliamentary General Election ===
Results of the 11th parliamentary election held on 10 October 2000 for the district of Polonnaruwa:

Party	Votes per Polling Division			Postal Votes	Total Votes	%	Seats
Party	Mediri- giriya	Minne -riya	Polon- naruwa	Postal Votes	Total Votes	%	Seats
United National Party	22,213	22,693	35,197	2,296	82,399	46.33%	3
People's Alliance (SLFP et al.)	21,075	21,014	34,979	2,955	80,023	44.99%	2
Janatha Vimukthi Peramuna	2,135	3,811	4,691	524	11,161	6.27%	0
National Unity Alliance (SLMC)	1,048	28	886	15	1,977	1.11%	0
New Left Front (NSSP et al.)	249	329	569	18	1,165	0.65%	0
Sinhala Heritage	123	142	317	33	615	0.35%	0
Citizen's Front	24	28	103	4	159	0.09%	0
Liberal Party	20	30	42	1	93	0.05%	0
Sinhalaye Mahasammatha Bhoomiputra Pakshaya	21	26	25	5	77	0.04%	0
Independent 2	20	15	34	1	70	0.04%	0
Democratic United National Front	16	16	33	1	66	0.04%	0
Independent 1	8	18	16	1	43	0.02%	0
People's Freedom Front	5	4	13	1	23	0.01%	0
Valid Votes	46,957	48,154	76,905	5,855	177,871	100.00%	5
Rejected Votes	2,395	2,770	4,710	194	10,069		
Total Polled	49,352	50,924	81,615	6,049	187,940		
Registered Electors	61,872	63,895	103,667		229,434		
Turnout	79.76%	79.70%	78.73%		81.91%		

The following candidates were elected: Maithripala Sirisena (PA), 57,072 preference votes (pv); Earl Gunasekara (UNP), 56,213 pv; Hewa Gajaman Paththinige Nelson (UNP), 31,241 pv; Rukman Senanayake (UNP), 27,200 pv; and Herath Mudiyanselage Nandasena Herath (PA), 22,872 pv.

=== 2001 Parliamentary General Election ===
Results of the 12th parliamentary election held on 5 December 2001 for the district of Polonnaruwa:

Party	Votes per Polling Division			Postal Votes	Total Votes	%	Seats
Party	Mediri- giriya	Minne -riya	Polon- naruwa	Postal Votes	Total Votes	%	Seats
United National Front (UNP, SLMC, CWC, DPF)	24,450	21,436	39,349		86,786	47.82%	3
People's Alliance (SLFP et al.)	19,149	19,423	33,531		73,679	40.60%	2
Janatha Vimukthi Peramuna	4,355	6,749	7,280		18,956	10.44%	0
New Left Front (NSSP et al.)	416	435	662		1,517	0.84%	0
Sinhala Heritage	37	57	99		199	0.11%	0
Democratic United National Front	20	34	55		109	0.06%	0
Independent 4	12	26	32		70	0.04%	0
Sinhalaye Mahasammatha Bhoomiputra Pakshaya	9	18	18		45	0.02%	0
Independent 1	8	15	12		36	0.02%	0
Independent 2	7	15	11		34	0.02%	0
Independent 3	4	9	16		29	0.02%	0
Ruhuna People's Party	7	7	6		21	0.01%	0
Sri Lanka Progressive Front	4	7	5		16	0.01%	0
Valid Votes	48,478	48,231	81,076		181,497	100.00%	5
Rejected Votes	2,401	3,393	5,995		11,854		
Total Polled	50,879	51,624	87,071		193,351		
Registered Electors	63,518	66,645	110,281		240,444		
Turnout	80.10%	77.46%	78.95%		80.41%		

The following candidates were elected: Earl Gunasekara (UNF), 57,957 preference votes (pv); Maithripala Sirisena (PA), 52,421 pv; Hewa Gajaman Paththinige Nelson (UNF), 41,822 pv; Ananda Sarath Kumara Rathnayake (PA), 40,384 pv; and Kapugamage Palle Mulle Sidney Jayaratne (UNF), 28,109 pv.

=== 2004 Parliamentary General Election ===
Results of the 13th parliamentary election held on 2 April 2004 for the district of Polonnaruwa:

Party	Votes per Polling Division			Postal Votes	Total Votes	%	Seats
Party	Mediri- giriya	Minne -riya	Polon- naruwa	Postal Votes	Total Votes	%	Seats
United People's Freedom Alliance (SLFP, JVP et al.)	26,114	30,342	45,936	3,851	106,243	57.35%	3
United National Front (UNP, SLMC, CWC, DPF)	20,522	17,522	35,420	2,200	75,664	40.84%	2
Jathika Hela Urumaya	388	850	1,067	108	2,413	1.30%	0
United Socialist Party	182	152	290	3	627	0.34%	0
National Development Front	23	32	59	2	116	0.06%	0
Independent 10	16	21	14	0	51	0.03%	0
New Left Front (NSSP et al.)	8	12	20	1	41	0.02%	0
Sri Lanka National Front	1	4	8	2	15	0.01%	0
Sinhalaye Mahasammatha Bhoomiputra Pakshaya	2	7	3	1	13	0.01%	0
Independent 1	2	3	8	0	13	0.01%	0
Independent 9	4	4	5	0	13	0.01%	0
Independent 2	3	4	3	1	11	0.01%	0
Independent 3	4	3	2	0	9	0.00%	0
Independent 4	1	4	3	0	8	0.00%	0
Ruhuna People's Party	0	1	4	1	6	0.00%	0
Independent 6	2	0	3	0	5	0.00%	0
Independent 8	1	2	2	0	5	0.00%	0
Independent 5	1	2	1	0	4	0.00%	0
Independent 7	2	0	2	0	4	0.00%	0
Valid Votes	47,276	48,965	82,850	6,170	185,261	100.00%	5
Rejected Votes	3,035	3,746	5,683	209	12,673		
Total Polled	50,311	52,711	88,533	6,379	197,934		
Registered Electors	66,605	70,308	117,148		254,061		
Turnout	75.54%	74.97%	75.57%		77.91%		

The following candidates were elected: Maithripala Sirisena (UPFA-SLFP), 72,451 preference votes (pv); S. K. Subasinghe (UPFA-JVP), 61,580 pv; Siripala Gamalath (UPFA-SLFP), 47,085 pv; Earl Gunasekara (UNF-UNP), 38,681 pv; and C. A. Suriyaarachchi (UNF-UNP), 37,983 pv.

=== 2010 Parliamentary General Election ===
Results of the 14th parliamentary election held on 8 April 2010 for the district of Polonnaruwa:

Party	Votes per Polling Division			Postal Votes	Total Votes	%	Seats
Party	Mediri- giriya	Minne -riya	Polon- naruwa	Postal Votes	Total Votes	%	Seats
United People's Freedom Alliance (SLFP et al.)	26,794	29,597	51,998	10,305	118,694	69.22%	4
United National Front (UNP, SLMC, DPF, SLFP(P))	12,572	8,890	21,579	2,691	45,732	26.67%	1
Democratic National Alliance (JVP et al.)	1,199	2,166	2,453	639	6,457	3.77%	0
Our National Front	34	34	55	7	130	0.08%	0
United National Alternative Front	14	10	30	1	55	0.03%	0
Tamil Makkal Viduthalai Pulikal	2	0	50	1	53	0.03%	0
Sri Lanka National Front	24	6	11	6	47	0.03%	0
National Development Front	4	12	21	6	43	0.03%	0
Janasetha Peramuna	3	2	18	3	26	0.02%	0
Independent 1	3	5	10	2	20	0.01%	0
Independent 11	7	5	5	1	18	0.01%	0
Independent 13	6	6	6	0	18	0.01%	0
United Democratic Front	3	3	9	2	17	0.01%	0
United Lanka Great Council	3	5	8	1	17	0.01%	0
Independent 7	2	2	11	2	17	0.01%	0
Patriotic National Front	3	9	4	0	16	0.01%	0
Independent 10	2	1	10	0	13	0.01%	0
Ruhuna People's Party	3	5	4	0	12	0.01%	0
Independent 4	1	6	4	1	12	0.01%	0
Independent 5	3	6	3	0	12	0.01%	0
Independent 12	3	3	6	0	12	0.01%	0
Independent 2	3	5	1	1	10	0.01%	0
Independent 8	3	0	6	1	10	0.01%	0
Independent 3	3	4	0	1	8	0.00%	0
National People's Party	1	2	3	1	7	0.00%	0
Sinhalaye Mahasammatha Bhoomiputra Pakshaya	2	0	2	2	6	0.00%	0
Independent 6	3	0	3	0	6	0.00%	0
Independent 9	0	1	1	0	2	0.00%	0
Left Liberation Front	0	0	1	0	1	0.00%	0
Valid Votes	40,700	40,785	76,312	13,674	171,471	100.00%	5
Rejected Votes	3,613	3,643	6,804	738	14,798		
Total Polled	44,313	44,428	83,116	14,412	186,269		
Registered Electors	72,402	77,084	130,851		280,337		
Turnout	61.20%	57.64%	63.52%		66.44%		

The following candidates were elected: Maithripala Sirisena (UPFA-SLFP), 90,118 preference votes (pv); Ranasinghe Roshan (UPFA), 56,223 pv; Siripala Gamalath (UPFA-SLFP), 53,973 pv; C. A. Suriyaarachchi (UPFA), 44,356 pv; and Earl Gunasekara (UNF-UNP), 26,925 pv.

== President ==
Candidate	Party	Votes	%
Maithripala Sirisena	New Democratic Front	6,217,162	51.28
Mahinda Rajapaksa	Sri Lanka Freedom Party	5,768,090	47.58
Ratnayake Arachchige Sirisena	Patriotic National Front	18,174	0.15
Namal Ajith Rajapaksa	Our National Front	15,726	0.13
Maulawi Ibrahim Mohanmed Mishlar	United Peace Front	14,379	0.12
A. S. P. Liyanage	Sri Lanka Labour Party	14,351	0.12
Ruwanthileke Peduru	United Lanka People's Party	12,436	0.10
Aithurus M. Illias	Independent	10,618	0.09
Duminda Nagamuwa	Frontline Socialist Party	9,941	0.08
Siritunga Jayasuriya	United Socialist Party	8,840	0.07
Sarath Manamendra	New Sinhala Heritage	6,875	0.06
Pani Wijesiriwardene	Socialist Equality Party	4,277	0.04
Anurudha Polgampola	Independent	4,260	0.04
Sundaram Mahendran	Nava Sama Samaja Party	4,047	0.03
Muthu Bandara Theminimulla	All Are Citizens, All Are Kings Organisation	3,846	0.03
Battaramulle Seelarathana	Jana Setha Peramuna	3,750	0.03
Prasanna Priyankara	Democratic National Movement	2,793	0.02
Jayantha Kulathunga	United Lanka Great Council	2,061	0.02
Wimal Geeganage	Sri Lanka National Front	1,826	0.02
Total		12,123,452	100.00
Valid votes		12,123,452	98.85
Invalid/blank votes		140,925	1.15
Total votes		12,264,377	100.00
Registered voters/turnout		15,044,490	81.52
Source: Election Commission
