= Polonnaruwa Electoral District =

Electoral district in Sri Lanka

Polonnaruwa
- Electoral District for the Parliament of Sri Lanka
- Administrative District: Polonnaruwa
- Province: North Central
- Polling divisions: Polonnaruwa, Minneriya, Medirigiriya
- Population: 400,000 (2008)
- Electorate: 280,337 (2010)
- Area: 3,293 km^{2} (1,271 sq mi)

Current Electoral District
- Number of members: 5
- MPs: NPP (4) T. B. Sarath; Jagath Wickramaratne; Sunil Rathnasiri; Padmasiri Bandara SJB (1) Kins Nelson

Polonnaruwa electoral district is one of the 22 multi-member electoral districts of Sri Lanka created by the 1978 Constitution of Sri Lanka. The district is conterminous with the administrative district of Polonnaruwa in the North Central province. The district currently elects 5 of the 225 members of the Sri Lankan Parliament and had 280,337 registered electors in 2010. The district is Sri Lanka's Electorate Number 18.

== Polling Divisions ==
The Polonnaruwa Electoral District consists of the following polling divisions:

A: Minneriya

B: Medirigiriya

C: Polonnaruwa

== Presidential Elections ==
=== 1982 Presidential Election ===
Results of the 1st presidential election held on 20 October 1982 for the district:

| Candidate | Party | Votes per Polling Division | | | Postal Votes | Total Votes | % |
| Candidate | Party | Medirigiriya | Minneriya | Polonnaruwa | Postal Votes | Total Votes | % |
|---|---|---|---|---|---|---|---|
| Junius Jayewardene | UNP | 20,324 | 17,728 | 20,616 | 746 | 59,414 | 56.26% |
| Hector Kobbekaduwa | SLFP | 11,777 | 12,818 | 12,286 | 362 | 37,243 | 35.26% |
| Rohana Wijeweera | JVP | 2,736 | 3,181 | 2,161 | 60 | 8,138 | 7.71% |
| Colvin R. de Silva | LSSP | 140 | 169 | 133 | 9 | 451 | 0.43% |
| Kumar Ponnambalam | ACTC | 24 | 35 | 166 | 3 | 228 | 0.22% |
| Vasudeva Nanayakkara | NSSP | 22 | 58 | 54 | 7 | 141 | 0.13% |
| Valid Votes | | 35,023 | 33,989 | 35,416 | 1,187 | 105,615 | 100.00% |
| Rejected Votes | | 312 | 315 | 426 | 11 | 1,064 | |
| Total Polled | | 35,335 | 34,304 | 35,842 | 1,198 | 106,679 | |
| Registered Electors | | 43,240 | 40,329 | 44,055 | | 127,624 | |
| Turnout | | 81.72% | 85.06% | 81.36% | | 83.59% | |

=== 1988 Presidential Election ===
Results of the 2nd presidential election held on 19 December 1988 for the district:

| Candidate | Party | Votes per Polling Division | | | Postal Votes | Total Votes | % |
| Candidate | Party | Medirigiriya | Minneriya | Polonnaruwa | Postal Votes | Total Votes | % |
|---|---|---|---|---|---|---|---|
| Ranasinghe Premadasa | UNP | 6,592 | 2,433 | 17,179 | 188 | 26,392 | 55.54% |
| Sirimavo Bandaranaike | SLFP | 3,497 | 2,123 | 14,320 | 233 | 20,173 | 42.45% |
| Ossie Abeygunasekara | SLMP | 161 | 125 | 651 | 20 | 957 | 2.01% |
| Valid Votes | | 10,250 | 4,681 | 32,150 | 441 | 47,522 | 100.00% |
| Rejected Votes | | 448 | 44 | 634 | 31 | 1,157 | |
| Total Polled | | 10,698 | 4,725 | 32,784 | 472 | 48,679 | |
| Registered Electors | | 48,728 | 50,128 | 64,885 | | 163,741 | |
| Turnout | | 21.95% | 9.43% | 50.53% | | 29.73% | |

=== 1994 Presidential Election ===
Results of the 3rd presidential election held on 9 November 1994 for the district:

| Candidate | Party | Votes per Polling Division | | | Postal Votes | Total Votes | % |
| Candidate | Party | Medirigiriya | Minneriya | Polonnaruwa | Postal Votes | Total Votes | % |
|---|---|---|---|---|---|---|---|
| Chandrika Kumaratunga | PA | 23,977 | 25,779 | 36,865 | 2,286 | 88,907 | 59.08% |
| Srima Dissanayake | UNP | 17,588 | 15,079 | 25,284 | 1,336 | 59,287 | 39.40% |
| Hudson Samarasinghe | Ind 2 | 313 | 279 | 527 | 7 | 1,126 | 0.75% |
| Nihal Galappaththi | SLPF | 111 | 169 | 173 | 16 | 469 | 0.31% |
| Harischandra Wijayatunga | SMBP | 112 | 134 | 169 | 13 | 428 | 0.28% |
| A. J. Ranasinghe | Ind 1 | 67 | 64 | 118 | 9 | 258 | 0.17% |
| Valid Votes | | 42,168 | 41,504 | 63,136 | 3,667 | 150,475 | 100.00% |
| Rejected Votes | | 965 | 1,204 | 1,716 | 81 | 3,966 | |
| Total Polled | | 43,133 | 42,708 | 64,852 | 3,748 | 154,441 | |
| Registered Electors | | 55,264 | 57,393 | 87,535 | | 200,192 | |
| Turnout | | 78.05% | 74.41% | 74.09% | | 77.15% | |

=== 1999 Presidential Election ===
Results of the 4th presidential election held on 21 December 1999 for the district:

| Candidate | Party | Votes per Polling Division | | | Postal Votes | Total Votes | % |
| Candidate | Party | Medirigiriya | Minneriya | Polonnaruwa | Postal Votes | Total Votes | % |
|---|---|---|---|---|---|---|---|
| Chandrika Kumaratunga | PA | 23,395 | 24,141 | 39,372 | 1,755 | 88,663 | 51.55% |
| Ranil Wickremasinghe | UNP | 20,345 | 18,627 | 32,472 | 1,154 | 72,598 | 42.21% |
| Nandana Gunathilake | JVP | 1,709 | 2,849 | 3,165 | 297 | 8,020 | 4.66% |
| Rajiva Wijesinha | Liberal | 132 | 140 | 269 | 1 | 542 | 0.32% |
| W.V.M. Ranjith | Ind 2 | 135 | 149 | 257 | 0 | 541 | 0.31% |
| T. Edirisuriya | Ind 1 | 94 | 107 | 189 | 2 | 392 | 0.23% |
| Harischandra Wijayatunga | SMBP | 95 | 119 | 146 | 21 | 381 | 0.22% |
| Kamal Karunadasa | PLSF | 86 | 66 | 92 | 3 | 247 | 0.14% |
| Abdul Rasool | SLMP | 55 | 60 | 125 | 0 | 240 | 0.14% |
| Vasudeva Nanayakkara | LDA | 33 | 51 | 65 | 16 | 165 | 0.10% |
| Hudson Samarasinghe | Ind 3 | 32 | 28 | 55 | 1 | 116 | 0.07% |
| A. Dissanayaka | DUNF | 10 | 26 | 26 | 3 | 65 | 0.04% |
| A.W. Premawardhana | PFF | 8 | 13 | 16 | 0 | 37 | 0.02% |
| Valid Votes | | 46,129 | 46,376 | 76,249 | 3,253 | 172,007 | 100.00% |
| Rejected Votes | | 736 | 859 | 1,473 | 83 | 3,151 | |
| Total Polled | | 46,865 | 47,235 | 77,722 | 3,336 | 175,158 | |
| Registered Electors | | 60,171 | 61,803 | 98,929 | | 220,903 | |
| Turnout | | 77.89% | 76.43% | 78.56% | | 79.29% | |

=== 2005 Presidential Election ===
Results of the 5th presidential election held on 17 November 2005 for the district:

| Candidate | Party | Votes per Polling Division | | | Postal Votes | Total Votes | % |
| Candidate | Party | Medirigiriya | Minneriya | Polonnaruwa | Postal Votes | Total Votes | % |
|---|---|---|---|---|---|---|---|
| Mahinda Rajapaksa | UPFA | 27,230 | 31,081 | 47,188 | 5,000 | 110,499 | 52.61% |
| Ranil Wickremasinghe | UNP | 25,533 | 23,819 | 44,951 | 2,839 | 97,142 | 46.25% |
| A.A. Suraweera | NDF | 172 | 199 | 308 | 4 | 683 | 0.33% |
| Siritunga Jayasuriya | USP | 181 | 176 | 231 | 1 | 589 | 0.28% |
| Victor Hettigoda | ULPP | 42 | 65 | 112 | 7 | 226 | 0.11% |
| Chamil Jayaneththi | NLF | 61 | 52 | 106 | 7 | 226 | 0.11% |
| Aruna de Soyza | RPP | 50 | 61 | 108 | 2 | 221 | 0.11% |
| Anura De Silva | ULF | 48 | 39 | 51 | 3 | 141 | 0.07% |
| Wimal Geeganage | SLNF | 25 | 43 | 47 | 4 | 119 | 0.06% |
| A.K.J. Arachchige | DUA | 18 | 28 | 32 | 3 | 81 | 0.04% |
| P. Nelson Perera | SLPF | 15 | 12 | 20 | 1 | 48 | 0.02% |
| Wije Dias | SEP | 5 | 6 | 19 | 1 | 31 | 0.01% |
| H.S. Dharmadwaja | UNAF | 8 | 6 | 10 | 0 | 24 | 0.01% |
| Valid Votes | | 53,388 | 55,587 | 93,183 | 7,872 | 210,030 | 100.00% |
| Rejected Votes | | 402 | 536 | 936 | 128 | 2,002 | |
| Total Polled | | 53,790 | 56,123 | 94,119 | 8,000 | 212,032 | |
| Registered Electors | | 69,230 | 72,430 | 121,949 | | 263,609 | |
| Turnout | | 77.70% | 77.49% | 77.18% | | 80.43% | |

=== 2010 Presidential Election ===
Results of the 6th presidential election held on 26 January 2010 for the district:

| Candidate | Party | Votes per Polling Division | | | Postal Votes | Total Votes | % |
| Candidate | Party | Medirigiriya | Minneriya | Polonnaruwa | Postal Votes | Total Votes | % |
|---|---|---|---|---|---|---|---|
| Mahinda Rajapaksa | UPFA | 34,613 | 39,587 | 60,718 | 9,971 | 144,889 | 64.92% |
| Sarath Fonseka | NDF | 18,979 | 16,517 | 35,473 | 4,057 | 75,026 | 33.62% |
| M.C.M. Ismail | DUNF | 93 | 167 | 320 | 39 | 619 | 0.28% |
| W.V. Mahiman Ranjith | Ind 1 | 130 | 139 | 228 | 10 | 507 | 0.23% |
| A.A. Suraweera | NDF | 89 | 163 | 219 | 6 | 477 | 0.21% |
| C.J. Sugathsiri Gamage | UDF | 57 | 55 | 118 | 6 | 236 | 0.11% |
| A.S.P Liyanage | SLLP | 49 | 70 | 99 | 1 | 219 | 0.10% |
| Sarath Manamendra | NSH | 61 | 40 | 98 | 2 | 201 | 0.09% |
| Ukkubanda Wijekoon | Ind 3 | 57 | 49 | 88 | 1 | 195 | 0.09% |
| Lal Perera | ONF | 45 | 39 | 85 | 3 | 172 | 0.08% |
| Siritunga Jayasuriya | USP | 24 | 30 | 61 | 0 | 115 | 0.05% |
| Aithurus M. Illias | Ind 2 | 16 | 23 | 29 | 5 | 73 | 0.03% |
| Vikramabahu Karunaratne | LF | 9 | 21 | 39 | 2 | 71 | 0.03% |
| Sanath Pinnaduwa | NA | 18 | 14 | 30 | 0 | 62 | 0.03% |
| Wije Dias | SEP | 8 | 16 | 29 | 1 | 54 | 0.02% |
| M. K. Shivajilingam | Ind 5 | 9 | 13 | 29 | 3 | 54 | 0.02% |
| M. Mohamed Musthaffa | Ind 4 | 12 | 11 | 22 | 0 | 45 | 0.02% |
| Senaratna de Silva | PNF | 7 | 8 | 21 | 2 | 38 | 0.02% |
| Rev. Battaramulla Seelarathana Thero | JP | 3 | 10 | 17 | 2 | 32 | 0.01% |
| M.B. Thaminimulla | ACAKO | 7 | 8 | 15 | 1 | 31 | 0.01% |
| Sarath Kongahage | UNAF | 8 | 6 | 13 | 3 | 30 | 0.01% |
| Aruna de Soyza | RPP | 8 | 4 | 17 | 0 | 29 | 0.01% |
| Valid Votes | | 54,302 | 56,990 | 97,768 | 14,115 | 223,175 | 100.00% |
| Rejected Votes | | 281 | 350 | 710 | 131 | 1,472 | |
| Total Polled | | 54,583 | 57,340 | 98,478 | 14,246 | 224,647 | |
| Registered Electors | | 72,402 | 77,084 | 130,851 | | 280,337 | |
| Turnout | | 75.39% | 74.39% | 75.26% | | 80.13% | |

== Parliamentary General Elections ==
=== 1989 Parliamentary General Election ===
Results of the 9th parliamentary election held on 15 February 1989 for the district:

| Party | Votes per Polling Division | | | Postal Votes | Total Votes | % | Seats |
| Party | Mediri- giriya | Minne -riya | Polon- naruwa | Postal Votes | Total Votes | % | Seats |
|---|---|---|---|---|---|---|---|
| United National Party | 8,631 | 10,576 | 23,469 | 797 | 43,473 | 62.33% | 4 |
| Sri Lanka Freedom Party | 3,384 | 7,431 | 11,973 | 433 | 23,221 | 33.29% | 1 |
| United Lanka People's Party | 148 | 711 | 1,052 | 22 | 1,933 | 2.77% | 0 |
| United Socialist Alliance (CPSL, LSSP, NSSP, SLMP) | 67 | 765 | 250 | 35 | 1,117 | 1.60% | 0 |
| Valid Votes | 12,230 | 19,483 | 36,744 | 1,287 | 69,744 | 100.00% | 5 |
| Rejected Votes | 959 | 1,866 | 2,376 | 65 | 5,266 | | |
| Total Polled | 13,189 | 21,349 | 39,120 | 1,352 | 75,010 | | |
| Registered Electors | 48,477 | 49,700 | 64,163 | 1,405 | 163,745 | | |
| Turnout | 27.21% | 42.96% | 60.97% | 96.23% | 45.81% | | |

The following candidates were elected: Hewa Gajaman Paththinige Nelson (UNP), 18,093 preference votes (pv); Maithripala Sirisena (SLFP), 13,652 pv; Seid Ahamed Abdul Majeed (UNP), 12,299 pv; C. A. Suriyaarachchi (UNP), 11,318 pv; and Samarasinghe Arachchilage Muthubanda (UNP), 10,336 pv.

=== 1994 Parliamentary General Election ===
Results of the 10th parliamentary election held on 16 August 1994 for the district:

| Party | Votes per Polling Division | | | Postal Votes | Total Votes | % | Seats |
| Party | Mediri- giriya | Minne -riya | Polon- naruwa | Postal Votes | Total Votes | % | Seats |
|---|---|---|---|---|---|---|---|
| People's Alliance (SLFP et al.) | 22,287 | 24,660 | 33,381 | 2,110 | 82,438 | 51.18% | 3 |
| United National Party | 22,261 | 20,379 | 32,562 | 1,504 | 76,706 | 47.62% | 2 |
| Sri Lanka Progressive Front (JVP) | 308 | 811 | 750 | 65 | 1,934 | 1.20% | 0 |
| Valid Votes | 44,856 | 45,850 | 66,693 | 3,679 | 161,078 | 100.00% | 5 |
| Rejected Votes | 1,626 | 1,758 | 2,984 | 66 | 6,434 | | |
| Total Polled | 46,482 | 47,608 | 69,677 | 3,745 | 167,512 | | |
| Registered Electors | 55,264 | 57,393 | 87,535 | | 200,192 | | |
| Turnout | 84.11% | 82.95% | 79.60% | | 83.68% | | |

The following candidates were elected: Maithripala Sirisena (PA), 62,925 preference votes (pv); Rukman Senanayake (UNP), 45,648 pv; Hewa Gajaman Paththinige Nelson (UNP), 39,439 pv; Thilakarathne Bandara Mahalekam (PA), 26,465 pv; and Herath Mudiyanselage Nandasena Herath (PA), 26,213 pv.

=== 2000 Parliamentary General Election ===
Results of the 11th parliamentary election held on 10 October 2000 for the district:

| Party | Votes per Polling Division | | | Postal Votes | Total Votes | % | Seats |
| Party | Mediri- giriya | Minne -riya | Polon- naruwa | Postal Votes | Total Votes | % | Seats |
|---|---|---|---|---|---|---|---|
| United National Party | 22,213 | 22,693 | 35,197 | 2,296 | 82,399 | 46.33% | 3 |
| People's Alliance (SLFP et al.) | 21,075 | 21,014 | 34,979 | 2,955 | 80,023 | 44.99% | 2 |
| Janatha Vimukthi Peramuna | 2,135 | 3,811 | 4,691 | 524 | 11,161 | 6.27% | 0 |
| National Unity Alliance (SLMC) | 1,048 | 28 | 886 | 15 | 1,977 | 1.11% | 0 |
| New Left Front (NSSP et al.) | 249 | 329 | 569 | 18 | 1,165 | 0.65% | 0 |
| Sinhala Heritage | 123 | 142 | 317 | 33 | 615 | 0.35% | 0 |
| Citizen's Front | 24 | 28 | 103 | 4 | 159 | 0.09% | 0 |
| Liberal Party | 20 | 30 | 42 | 1 | 93 | 0.05% | 0 |
| Sinhalaye Mahasammatha Bhoomiputra Pakshaya | 21 | 26 | 25 | 5 | 77 | 0.04% | 0 |
| Independent 2 | 20 | 15 | 34 | 1 | 70 | 0.04% | 0 |
| Democratic United National Front | 16 | 16 | 33 | 1 | 66 | 0.04% | 0 |
| Independent 1 | 8 | 18 | 16 | 1 | 43 | 0.02% | 0 |
| People's Freedom Front | 5 | 4 | 13 | 1 | 23 | 0.01% | 0 |
| Valid Votes | 46,957 | 48,154 | 76,905 | 5,855 | 177,871 | 100.00% | 5 |
| Rejected Votes | 2,395 | 2,770 | 4,710 | 194 | 10,069 | | |
| Total Polled | 49,352 | 50,924 | 81,615 | 6,049 | 187,940 | | |
| Registered Electors | 61,872 | 63,895 | 103,667 | | 229,434 | | |
| Turnout | 79.76% | 79.70% | 78.73% | | 81.91% | | |

The following candidates were elected: Maithripala Sirisena (PA), 57,072 preference votes (pv); Earl Gunasekara (UNP), 56,213 pv; Hewa Gajaman Paththinige Nelson (UNP), 31,241 pv; Rukman Senanayake (UNP), 27,200 pv; and Herath Mudiyanselage Nandasena Herath (PA), 22,872 pv.

=== 2001 Parliamentary General Election ===
Results of the 12th parliamentary election held on 5 December 2001 for the district:

| Party | Votes per Polling Division | | | Postal Votes | Total Votes | % | Seats |
| Party | Mediri- giriya | Minne -riya | Polon- naruwa | Postal Votes | Total Votes | % | Seats |
|---|---|---|---|---|---|---|---|
| United National Front (UNP, SLMC, CWC, DPF) | 24,450 | 21,436 | 39,349 | | 86,786 | 47.82% | 3 |
| People's Alliance (SLFP et al.) | 19,149 | 19,423 | 33,531 | | 73,679 | 40.60% | 2 |
| Janatha Vimukthi Peramuna | 4,355 | 6,749 | 7,280 | | 18,956 | 10.44% | 0 |
| New Left Front (NSSP et al.) | 416 | 435 | 662 | | 1,517 | 0.84% | 0 |
| Sinhala Heritage | 37 | 57 | 99 | | 199 | 0.11% | 0 |
| Democratic United National Front | 20 | 34 | 55 | | 109 | 0.06% | 0 |
| Independent 4 | 12 | 26 | 32 | | 70 | 0.04% | 0 |
| Sinhalaye Mahasammatha Bhoomiputra Pakshaya | 9 | 18 | 18 | | 45 | 0.02% | 0 |
| Independent 1 | 8 | 15 | 12 | | 36 | 0.02% | 0 |
| Independent 2 | 7 | 15 | 11 | | 34 | 0.02% | 0 |
| Independent 3 | 4 | 9 | 16 | | 29 | 0.02% | 0 |
| Ruhuna People's Party | 7 | 7 | 6 | | 21 | 0.01% | 0 |
| Sri Lanka Progressive Front | 4 | 7 | 5 | | 16 | 0.01% | 0 |
| Valid Votes | 48,478 | 48,231 | 81,076 | | 181,497 | 100.00% | 5 |
| Rejected Votes | 2,401 | 3,393 | 5,995 | | 11,854 | | |
| Total Polled | 50,879 | 51,624 | 87,071 | | 193,351 | | |
| Registered Electors | 63,518 | 66,645 | 110,281 | | 240,444 | | |
| Turnout | 80.10% | 77.46% | 78.95% | | 80.41% | | |

The following candidates were elected: Earl Gunasekara (UNF), 57,957 preference votes (pv); Maithripala Sirisena (PA), 52,421 pv; Hewa Gajaman Paththinige Nelson (UNF), 41,822 pv; Ananda Sarath Kumara Rathnayake (PA), 40,384 pv; and Kapugamage Palle Mulle Sidney Jayaratne (UNF), 28,109 pv.

=== 2004 Parliamentary General Election ===
Results of the 13th parliamentary election held on 2 April 2004 for the district:

| Party | Votes per Polling Division | | | Postal Votes | Total Votes | % | Seats |
| Party | Mediri- giriya | Minne -riya | Polon- naruwa | Postal Votes | Total Votes | % | Seats |
|---|---|---|---|---|---|---|---|
| United People's Freedom Alliance (SLFP, JVP et al.) | 26,114 | 30,342 | 45,936 | 3,851 | 106,243 | 57.35% | 3 |
| United National Front (UNP, SLMC, CWC, DPF) | 20,522 | 17,522 | 35,420 | 2,200 | 75,664 | 40.84% | 2 |
| Jathika Hela Urumaya | 388 | 850 | 1,067 | 108 | 2,413 | 1.30% | 0 |
| United Socialist Party | 182 | 152 | 290 | 3 | 627 | 0.34% | 0 |
| National Development Front | 23 | 32 | 59 | 2 | 116 | 0.06% | 0 |
| Independent 10 | 16 | 21 | 14 | 0 | 51 | 0.03% | 0 |
| New Left Front (NSSP et al.) | 8 | 12 | 20 | 1 | 41 | 0.02% | 0 |
| Sri Lanka National Front | 1 | 4 | 8 | 2 | 15 | 0.01% | 0 |
| Sinhalaye Mahasammatha Bhoomiputra Pakshaya | 2 | 7 | 3 | 1 | 13 | 0.01% | 0 |
| Independent 1 | 2 | 3 | 8 | 0 | 13 | 0.01% | 0 |
| Independent 9 | 4 | 4 | 5 | 0 | 13 | 0.01% | 0 |
| Independent 2 | 3 | 4 | 3 | 1 | 11 | 0.01% | 0 |
| Independent 3 | 4 | 3 | 2 | 0 | 9 | 0.00% | 0 |
| Independent 4 | 1 | 4 | 3 | 0 | 8 | 0.00% | 0 |
| Ruhuna People's Party | 0 | 1 | 4 | 1 | 6 | 0.00% | 0 |
| Independent 6 | 2 | 0 | 3 | 0 | 5 | 0.00% | 0 |
| Independent 8 | 1 | 2 | 2 | 0 | 5 | 0.00% | 0 |
| Independent 5 | 1 | 2 | 1 | 0 | 4 | 0.00% | 0 |
| Independent 7 | 2 | 0 | 2 | 0 | 4 | 0.00% | 0 |
| Valid Votes | 47,276 | 48,965 | 82,850 | 6,170 | 185,261 | 100.00% | 5 |
| Rejected Votes | 3,035 | 3,746 | 5,683 | 209 | 12,673 | | |
| Total Polled | 50,311 | 52,711 | 88,533 | 6,379 | 197,934 | | |
| Registered Electors | 66,605 | 70,308 | 117,148 | | 254,061 | | |
| Turnout | 75.54% | 74.97% | 75.57% | | 77.91% | | |

The following candidates were elected: Maithripala Sirisena (UPFA-SLFP), 72,451 preference votes (pv); S. K. Subasinghe (UPFA-JVP), 61,580 pv; Siripala Gamalath (UPFA-SLFP), 47,085 pv; Earl Gunasekara (UNF-UNP), 38,681 pv; and C. A. Suriyaarachchi (UNF-UNP), 37,983 pv.

=== 2010 Parliamentary General Election ===
Results of the 14th parliamentary election held on 8 April 2010 for the district:

| Party | Votes per Polling Division | | | Postal Votes | Total Votes | % | Seats |
| Party | Mediri- giriya | Minne -riya | Polon- naruwa | Postal Votes | Total Votes | % | Seats |
|---|---|---|---|---|---|---|---|
| United People's Freedom Alliance (SLFP et al.) | 26,794 | 29,597 | 51,998 | 10,305 | 118,694 | 69.22% | 4 |
| United National Front (UNP, SLMC, DPF, SLFP(P)) | 12,572 | 8,890 | 21,579 | 2,691 | 45,732 | 26.67% | 1 |
| Democratic National Alliance (JVP et al.) | 1,199 | 2,166 | 2,453 | 639 | 6,457 | 3.77% | 0 |
| Our National Front | 34 | 34 | 55 | 7 | 130 | 0.08% | 0 |
| United National Alternative Front | 14 | 10 | 30 | 1 | 55 | 0.03% | 0 |
| Tamil Makkal Viduthalai Pulikal | 2 | 0 | 50 | 1 | 53 | 0.03% | 0 |
| Sri Lanka National Front | 24 | 6 | 11 | 6 | 47 | 0.03% | 0 |
| National Development Front | 4 | 12 | 21 | 6 | 43 | 0.03% | 0 |
| Janasetha Peramuna | 3 | 2 | 18 | 3 | 26 | 0.02% | 0 |
| Independent 1 | 3 | 5 | 10 | 2 | 20 | 0.01% | 0 |
| Independent 11 | 7 | 5 | 5 | 1 | 18 | 0.01% | 0 |
| Independent 13 | 6 | 6 | 6 | 0 | 18 | 0.01% | 0 |
| United Democratic Front | 3 | 3 | 9 | 2 | 17 | 0.01% | 0 |
| United Lanka Great Council | 3 | 5 | 8 | 1 | 17 | 0.01% | 0 |
| Independent 7 | 2 | 2 | 11 | 2 | 17 | 0.01% | 0 |
| Patriotic National Front | 3 | 9 | 4 | 0 | 16 | 0.01% | 0 |
| Independent 10 | 2 | 1 | 10 | 0 | 13 | 0.01% | 0 |
| Ruhuna People's Party | 3 | 5 | 4 | 0 | 12 | 0.01% | 0 |
| Independent 4 | 1 | 6 | 4 | 1 | 12 | 0.01% | 0 |
| Independent 5 | 3 | 6 | 3 | 0 | 12 | 0.01% | 0 |
| Independent 12 | 3 | 3 | 6 | 0 | 12 | 0.01% | 0 |
| Independent 2 | 3 | 5 | 1 | 1 | 10 | 0.01% | 0 |
| Independent 8 | 3 | 0 | 6 | 1 | 10 | 0.01% | 0 |
| Independent 3 | 3 | 4 | 0 | 1 | 8 | 0.00% | 0 |
| National People's Party | 1 | 2 | 3 | 1 | 7 | 0.00% | 0 |
| Sinhalaye Mahasammatha Bhoomiputra Pakshaya | 2 | 0 | 2 | 2 | 6 | 0.00% | 0 |
| Independent 6 | 3 | 0 | 3 | 0 | 6 | 0.00% | 0 |
| Independent 9 | 0 | 1 | 1 | 0 | 2 | 0.00% | 0 |
| Left Liberation Front | 0 | 0 | 1 | 0 | 1 | 0.00% | 0 |
| Valid Votes | 40,700 | 40,785 | 76,312 | 13,674 | 171,471 | 100.00% | 5 |
| Rejected Votes | 3,613 | 3,643 | 6,804 | 738 | 14,798 | | |
| Total Polled | 44,313 | 44,428 | 83,116 | 14,412 | 186,269 | | |
| Registered Electors | 72,402 | 77,084 | 130,851 | | 280,337 | | |
| Turnout | 61.20% | 57.64% | 63.52% | | 66.44% | | |

The following candidates were elected: Maithripala Sirisena (UPFA-SLFP), 90,118 preference votes (pv); Ranasinghe Roshan (UPFA), 56,223 pv; Siripala Gamalath (UPFA-SLFP), 53,973 pv; C. A. Suriyaarachchi (UPFA), 44,356 pv; and Earl Gunasekara (UNF-UNP), 26,925 pv.

== Provincial Council Elections ==
=== 1993 Provincial Council Election ===
Results of the 2nd North Central provincial council election held on 17 May 1993 for the district:

| Party | Votes | % | Seats |
|---|---|---|---|
| United National Party | 69,606 | 52.26% | |
| People's Alliance (SLFP et al.) | 44,528 | 33.43% | |
| Democratic United National Front | 16,608 | 12.47% | |
| Sri Lanka Muslim Congress | 1,818 | 1.37% | |
| Nava Sama Samaja Party | 622 | 0.47% | |
| Valid Votes | 133,182 | | |
| Rejected Votes | 12,630 | | |
| Total Polled | 145,812 | | |
| Registered Electors | 196,031 | | |
| Turnout | 74.38% | | |

=== 1999 Provincial Council Election ===
Results of the 3rd North Central provincial council election held on 6 April 1999 for the district:

| Party | Votes | % | Seats |
|---|---|---|---|
| People's Alliance (SLFP, SLMC et al.) | 75,466 | 52.01% | |
| United National Party | 60,022 | 41.37% | |
| Janatha Vimukthi Peramuna | 8,498 | 5.86% | |
| Mahajana Eksath Peramuna | 394 | 0.27% | |
| Liberal Party | 388 | 0.27% | |
| Sinhalaye Mahasammatha Bhoomiputra Pakshaya | 334 | 0.23% | |
| Valid Votes | 145,102 | 100.00% | |
| Rejected Votes | 10,255 | | |
| Total Polled | 155,357 | | |
| Registered Electors | 217,318 | | |
| Turnout | 71.49% | | |

=== 2004 Provincial Council Election ===
Results of the 4th North Central provincial council election held on 10 July 2004 for the district:

| Party | Votes per Polling Division | | | Postal Votes | Total Votes | % | Seats |
| Party | Mediri- giriya | Minne -riya | Polon- naruwa | Postal Votes | Total Votes | % | Seats |
|---|---|---|---|---|---|---|---|
| United People's Freedom Alliance (SLFP, JVP et al.) | 22,700 | 25,789 | 40,340 | 2,238 | 91,067 | 62.19% | 6 |
| United National Party | 15,647 | 11,040 | 26,886 | 961 | 54,534 | 37.24% | 4 |
| United Socialist Party | 203 | 141 | 270 | 6 | 620 | 0.42% | 0 |
| Independent 3 | 16 | 27 | 37 | 0 | 80 | 0.05% | 0 |
| Sinhalaye Mahasammatha Bhoomiputra Pakshaya | 10 | 12 | 28 | 4 | 54 | 0.04% | 0 |
| United Sinhala Great Council | 2 | 11 | 14 | 1 | 28 | 0.02% | 0 |
| Independent 2 | 5 | 7 | 11 | 3 | 26 | 0.02% | 0 |
| Independent 1 | 7 | 5 | 10 | 2 | 24 | 0.02% | 0 |
| Valid Votes | 38,590 | 37,032 | 67,596 | 3,215 | 146,433 | 100.00% | 10 |
| Rejected Votes | 2,340 | 2,563 | 4,762 | 166 | 9,831 | | |
| Total Polled | 40,930 | 39,595 | 72,358 | 3,381 | 156,264 | | |
| Registered Electors | 66,605 | 70,308 | 117,148 | | 254,061 | | |
| Turnout | 61.45% | 56.32% | 61.77% | | 61.51% | | |

The following candidates were elected: Ananda Sarath Kumara Rathnayake (UPFA), 41,004 preference votes (pv); R. K. Indrananda (UPFA), 28,009 pv; M. G. Palitha Upul Kumara (UPFA), 24,242 pv; T. B. Sarath (UPFA), 21,774 pv; Kins Nelson (UNP), 21,100 pv; R. M. Punchi Banda Rathnayake (UPFA), 20,959 pv; Deniyegedara Saranelis Dayawansha (UPFA), 16,638 pv; Donald Mahamadakalapuwage (UNP), 14,591 pv; Ansar Shahul Hameed Mohamadu (UNP), 11,788 pv; and Arachchilage Janaka Priyantha Samarasinghe (UNP), 11,459 pv.

=== 2008 Provincial Council Election ===
Results of the 5th North Central provincial council election held on 23 August 2008 for the district:

| Party | Votes per Polling Division | | | Postal Votes | Total Votes | % | Seats |
| Party | Mediri- giriya | Minne -riya | Polon- naruwa | Postal Votes | Total Votes | % | Seats |
|---|---|---|---|---|---|---|---|
| United People's Freedom Alliance (SLFP et al.) | 25,729 | 27,582 | 49,828 | 4,771 | 107,910 | 59.73% | 6 |
| United National Party | 17,682 | 14,067 | 29,731 | 1,785 | 63,265 | 35.02% | 4 |
| Janatha Vimukthi Peramuna | 1,662 | 2,573 | 2,835 | 311 | 7,381 | 4.09% | 0 |
| National Congress | 796 | 20 | 519 | 36 | 1,371 | 0.76% | 0 |
| United National Alliance | 67 | 48 | 83 | 6 | 204 | 0.11% | 0 |
| United Socialist Party | 45 | 47 | 76 | 5 | 173 | 0.10% | 0 |
| Independent 8 | 12 | 23 | 39 | 2 | 76 | 0.04% | 0 |
| National Development Front | 18 | 30 | 22 | 4 | 74 | 0.04% | 0 |
| Independent 4 | 13 | 16 | 6 | 0 | 35 | 0.02% | 0 |
| Independent 6 | 8 | 17 | 9 | 1 | 35 | 0.02% | 0 |
| Left Front (NSSP et al.) | 5 | 5 | 11 | 4 | 25 | 0.01% | 0 |
| Sri Lanka Progressive Front | 0 | 7 | 14 | 4 | 25 | 0.01% | 0 |
| Independent 1 | 8 | 2 | 9 | 2 | 21 | 0.01% | 0 |
| Independent 7 | 3 | 6 | 7 | 2 | 18 | 0.01% | 0 |
| Independent 5 | 1 | 9 | 3 | 1 | 14 | 0.01% | 0 |
| Independent 2 | 5 | 5 | 3 | 0 | 13 | 0.01% | 0 |
| Independent 3 | 4 | 0 | 8 | 1 | 13 | 0.01% | 0 |
| Muslim Liberation Front | 2 | 4 | 4 | 0 | 10 | 0.01% | 0 |
| Valid Votes | 46,060 | 44,461 | 83,207 | 6,935 | 180,663 | 100.00% | 10 |
| Rejected Votes | 2,508 | 2,968 | 4,413 | 293 | 10,182 | | |
| Total Polled | 48,568 | 47,429 | 87,620 | 7,228 | 190,845 | | |
| Registered Electors | 72,128 | 76,120 | 128,808 | | 277,056 | | |
| Turnout | 67.34% | 62.31% | 68.02% | | 68.88% | | |
