= 2004 Sri Lankan provincial council elections =

4th Sri Lankan provincial council election
- 24 April 2004 & 10 July 2004

380 seats across 7 provincial councils
- Turnout: 55.86%
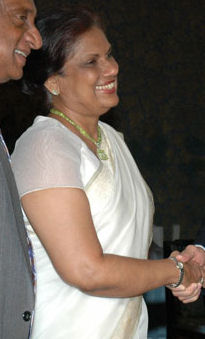

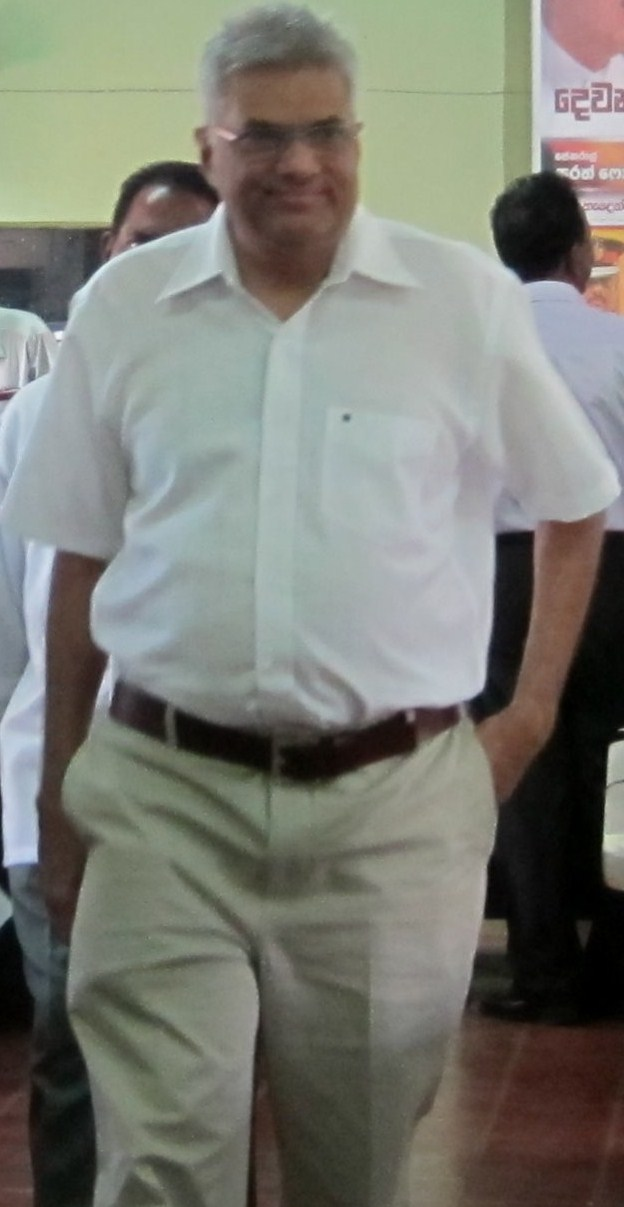
	First party	Second party
Leader	Chandrika Kumaratunga	Ranil Wickremasinghe
Party	UPFA	UNP
Popular vote	3,364,239	2,197,892
Percentage	57.68%	37.68%
Councillors	227	140
Councils	7	0
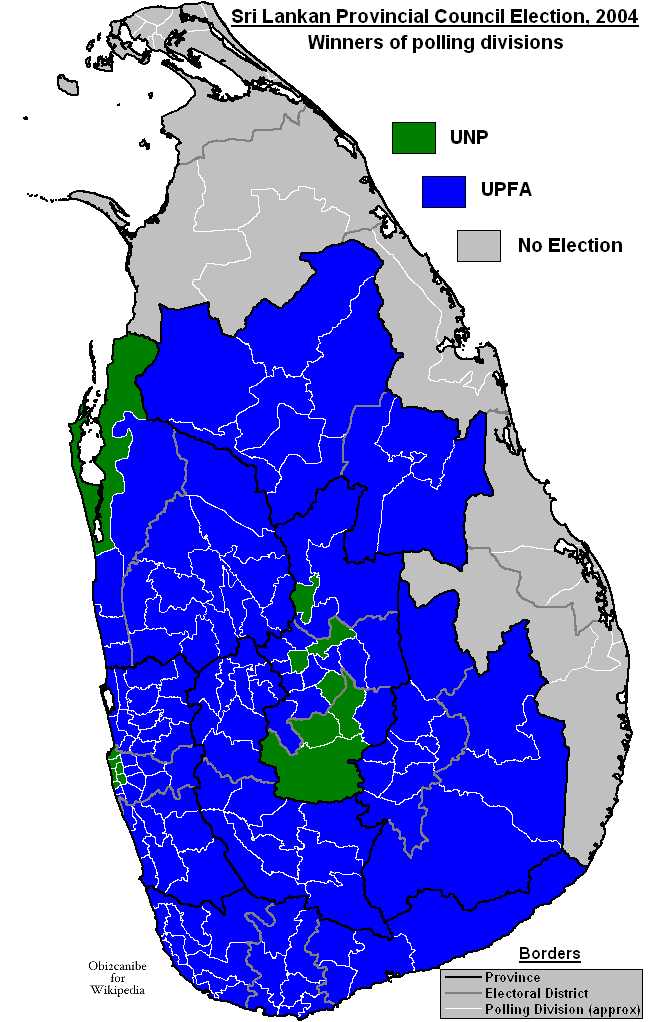
- Winners of polling divisions. UPFA in blue and UNP in green.

The 2004 Sri Lankan provincial council election was held on 24 April 2004 and 10 July 2004 to elect members to seven provincial councils in Sri Lanka. No election was held in the eighth province, North Eastern, which had been governed directly by the national government since March 1990. The United People's Freedom Alliance, which was in power nationally, won all seven provinces.

== Background ==
In an attempt to end the Sri Lankan Civil War the Indo-Lanka Accord was signed on 29 July 1987. One of the requirements of the accord was that the Sri Lankan government to devolve powers to the provinces. Accordingly on 14 November 1987 the Sri Lankan Parliament passed the 13th Amendment to the 1978 Constitution of Sri Lanka and the Provincial Councils Act No 42 of 1987. On 3 February 1988 nine provincial councils were created by order. The first elections for provincial councils took place on 28 April 1988 in North Central, North Western, Sabaragamuwa, and Uva provinces. On 2 June 1988 elections were held for provincial councils for Central, Southern and Western provinces. The United National Party (UNP), which was in power nationally, won control of all seven provincial councils.

The Indo-Lanka Accord also required the merger of the Eastern and Northern provinces into one administrative unit. The accord required a referendum to be held by 31 December 1988 in the Eastern Province to decide whether the merger should be permanent. Crucially, the accord allowed the Sri Lankan president to postpone the referendum at his discretion. On September 2 and 8 1988 President Jayewardene issued proclamations enabling the Eastern and Northern provinces to be one administrative unit administered by one elected council, creating the North Eastern Province. Elections in the newly merged North Eastern Province were held on 19 November 1988. The Eelam People's Revolutionary Liberation Front, an Indian backed paramilitary group, won control of the North Eastern provincial council.

On 1 March 1990, just as the Indian Peace Keeping Force were preparing to withdraw from Sri Lanka, Annamalai Varatharajah Perumal, Chief Minister of the North Eastern Province, moved a motion in the North Eastern Provincial Council declaring an independent Eelam. President Premadasa reacted to Permual's UDI by dissolving the provincial council and imposing direct rule on the province.

The 2nd Sri Lankan provincial council election was held in 1993 in seven provinces. The UNP retained control of six provincial councils but lost control of the largest provincial council, Western, to the opposition People's Alliance. A special election was held in Southern Province in 1994 after some UNP provincial councillors defected to the opposition. The PA won the election and took control of the Southern Provincial Council.

The 3rd Sri Lankan provincial council election was held in 1999 in seven provinces. The PA, which was now in power nationally, managed to win the majority of seats in two provinces (North Central and North Western). It was also able to form a majority administration in the other five provinces with the support of smaller parties such as the Ceylon Workers' Congress (CWC) . The UNP regained control of the Central Provincial Council in 2002 after the CWC councillors crossed over to the opposition.

== Results ==
The United People's Freedom Alliance, the successor to the PA, won all seven provinces.

=== Overall ===
Party / Alliance	Votes	%	Seats
United People's Freedom Alliance	3,364,239	57.68%	227
United National Party^{1 2}	2,197,892	37.68%	140
Sri Lanka Muslim Congress^{1}	119,796	2.05%	7
Up-Country People's Front	52,639	0.90%	3
United Socialist Party	21,372	0.37%	0
Western People's Front	15,871	0.27%	1
Independents	11,976	0.21%	0
Ceylon Workers' Congress^{2}	10,720	0.18%	1
National Development Front	10,493	0.18%	0
Sinhalaye Mahasammatha Bhoomiputra Pakshaya	6,981	0.12%	0
Democratic Unity Alliance	6,219	0.11%	1
United Lalith Front	3,765	0.06%	0
New Left Front	3,589	0.06%	0
Liberal Party	1,450	0.02%	0
United Sinhala Great Council	1,304	0.02%	0
United Muslim People's Alliance	1,139	0.02%	0
Sri Lanka Muslim Party	752	0.01%	0
Sri Lanka Progressive Front	730	0.01%	0
People's Liberation Solidarity Front	617	0.01%	0
Ruhuna People's Party	311	0.01%	0
National Democratic Party	287	0.00%	0
Sri Lanka National Front	224	0.00%	0
Democratic United National Front	218	0.00%	0
National People's Party	124	0.00%	0
Valid Votes	5,832,708	100.00%	380
Rejected Votes	380,055		
Total Polled	6,212,763		
Registered Electors	11,121,889		
Turnout	55.86%		
1. SLMC contested separately in North Central, North Western, Sabaragamuwa, and Western provinces, and with the UNP in Central and Uva provinces.; 2. CWC contested separately in Sabaragamuwa province and with the UNP in all other provinces.

=== Central Province ===
Results of the 4th Central provincial council election held on 10 July 2004:

Party / Alliance	Kandy			Matale			Nuwara Eliya			Bonus Seats	Total		
Party / Alliance	Votes	%	Seats	Votes	%	Seats	Votes	%	Seats	Bonus Seats	Votes	%	Seats
United People's Freedom Alliance	244,595	54.17%	16	92,510	56.12%	6	89,192	32.75%	6	2	426,297	47.97%	30
United National Party	202,264	44.80%	14	69,309	42.04%	4	138,572	50.88%	8		410,145	46.15%	26
Up-Country People's Front				1,135	0.69%	0	36,939	13.56%	2		38,074	4.28%	2
United Socialist Party	1,088	0.24%	0	1,152	0.70%	0	3,896	1.43%	0		6,136	0.69%	0
Independents	390	0.09%	0	120	0.07%	0	2,131	0.78%	0		2,641	0.30%	0
National Development Front	1,360	0.30%	0	399	0.24%	0	521	0.19%	0		2,280	0.26%	0
United Muslim People's Alliance	987	0.22%	0								987	0.11%	0
Liberal Party							860	0.32%	0		860	0.10%	0
Sinhalaye Mahasammatha Bhoomiputra Pakshaya	419	0.09%	0	117	0.07%	0	76	0.03%	0		612	0.07%	0
National Democratic Party	178	0.04%	0				109	0.04%	0		287	0.03%	0
Ruhuna People's Party	161	0.04%	0				31	0.01%	0		192	0.02%	0
Sri Lanka Progressive Front	76	0.02%	0								76	0.01%	0
National People's Party				62	0.04%	0					62	0.01%	0
Sri Lanka Muslim Party				53	0.03%	0					53	0.01%	0
Valid Votes	451,518	100.00%	30	164,857	100.00%	10	272,327	100.00%	16	2	888,702	100.00%	58
Rejected Votes	31,502			12,469			23,375				67,346		
Total Polled	483,020			177,326			295,702				956,048		
Registered Electors	880,635			312,556			436,248				1,629,439		
Turnout	54.85%			56.73%			67.78%				58.67%		

=== North Central Province ===
Results of the 4th North Central provincial council election held on 10 July 2004:

Party / Alliance	Anuradhapura			Polonnaruwa			Bonus Seats	Total		
Party / Alliance	Votes	%	Seats	Votes	%	Seats	Bonus Seats	Votes	%	Seats
United People's Freedom Alliance	187,977	63.92%	14	91,067	62.19%	6	2	279,044	63.34%	22
United National Party	89,166	30.32%	6	54,534	37.24%	4		143,700	32.62%	10
Sri Lanka Muslim Congress	14,391	4.89%	1					14,391	3.27%	1
United Socialist Party	1,217	0.41%	0	620	0.42%	0		1,837	0.42%	0
National Development Front	845	0.29%	0					845	0.19%	0
Independents	222	0.08%	0	130	0.09%	0		352	0.08%	0
Sinhalaye Mahasammatha Bhoomiputra Pakshaya	74	0.03%	0	54	0.04%	0		128	0.03%	0
Sri Lanka Progressive Front	126	0.04%	0					126	0.03%	0
United Sinhala Great Council	73	0.02%	0	28	0.02%	0		101	0.02%	0
Valid Votes	294,091	100.00%	21	146,433	100.00%	10	2	440,524	100.00%	33
Rejected Votes	21,600			9,831				31,431		
Total Polled	315,691			156,264				471,955		
Registered Electors	514,149			254,061				768,210		
Turnout	61.40%			61.51%				61.44%		

=== North Western Province ===
Results of the 4th North Western provincial council election held on 24 April 2004:

Party / Alliance	Kurunegala			Puttalam			Bonus Seats	Total		
Party / Alliance	Votes	%	Seats	Votes	%	Seats	Bonus Seats	Votes	%	Seats
United People's Freedom Alliance	362,084	59.85%	20	128,916	57.10%	9	2	491,000	59.10%	31
United National Party	215,905	35.69%	12	95,868	42.46%	7		311,773	37.53%	19
Sri Lanka Muslim Congress	24,173	4.00%	2					24,173	2.91%	2
National Development Front	623	0.10%	0	450	0.20%	0		1,073	0.13%	0
United Lalith Front	883	0.15%	0					883	0.11%	0
New Left Front	476	0.08%	0	89	0.04%	0		565	0.07%	0
Independents	178	0.03%	0	195	0.09%	0		373	0.04%	0
Sinhalaye Mahasammatha Bhoomiputra Pakshaya	295	0.05%	0	48	0.02%	0		343	0.04%	0
Sri Lanka Progressive Front	145	0.02%	0	15	0.01%	0		160	0.02%	0
United Muslim People's Alliance				152	0.07%	0		152	0.02%	0
Sri Lanka Muslim Party	83	0.01%	0	15	0.01%	0		98	0.01%	0
United Sinhala Great Council	91	0.02%	0					91	0.01%	0
Sri Lanka National Front	43	0.01%	0					43	0.01%	0
Ruhuna People's Party				17	0.01%	0		17	0.00%	0
Valid Votes	604,979	100.00%	34	225,765	100.00%	16	2	830,744	100.00%	52
Rejected Votes	28,019			9,600				37,619		
Total Polled	632,998			235,365				868,363		
Registered Electors	1,089,482			450,057				1,539,539		
Turnout	58.10%			52.30%				56.40%		

=== Sabaragamuwa Province ===
Results of the 4th Sabaragamuwa provincial council election held on 10 July 2004:

Party / Alliance	Kegalle			Ratnapura			Bonus Seats	Total		
Party / Alliance	Votes	%	Seats	Votes	%	Seats	Bonus Seats	Votes	%	Seats
United People's Freedom Alliance	185,112	58.90%	11	213,619	61.07%	15	2	398,731	60.04%	28
United National Party	115,551	36.77%	7	119,681	34.22%	8		235,232	35.42%	15
Ceylon Workers Congress	4,295	1.37%	0	6,425	1.84%	1		10,720	1.61%	1
Sri Lanka Muslim Congress	6,770	2.15%	0	3,731	1.07%	0		10,501	1.58%	0
United Socialist Party	798	0.25%	0	1,261	0.36%	0		2,059	0.31%	0
Up-Country People's Front				1,806	0.52%	0		1,806	0.27%	0
United Lalith Front	584	0.19%	0	707	0.20%	0		1,291	0.19%	0
National Development Front	423	0.13%	0	512	0.15%	0		935	0.14%	0
Western People's Front				854	0.24%	0		854	0.13%	0
Independents	339	0.11%	0	500	0.14%	0		839	0.13%	0
Liberal Party				262	0.07%	0		262	0.04%	0
United Sinhala Great Council	84	0.03%	0	96	0.03%	0		180	0.03%	0
Democratic United National Front	80	0.03%	0	83	0.02%	0		163	0.02%	0
Sinhalaye Mahasammatha Bhoomiputra Pakshaya	158	0.05%	0					158	0.02%	0
Sri Lanka Muslim Party				133	0.04%	0		133	0.02%	0
Sri Lanka Progressive Front	63	0.02%	0	52	0.01%	0		115	0.02%	0
National People's Party				62	0.02%	0		62	0.01%	0
Ruhuna People's Party	39	0.01%	0					39	0.01%	0
Valid Votes	314,296	100.00%	18	349,784	100.00%	24	2	664,080	100.00%	44
Rejected Votes	19,779			22,652				42,431		
Total Polled	334,075			372,436				706,511		
Registered Electors	570,299			647,035				1,217,334		
Turnout	58.58%			57.56%				58.04%		

=== Southern Province ===
Results of the 5th Southern provincial council election held on 10 July 2004:

Party / Alliance	Galle			Hambantota			Matara			Bonus Seats	Total		
Party / Alliance	Votes	%	Seats	Votes	%	Seats	Votes	%	Seats	Bonus Seats	Votes	%	Seats
United People's Freedom Alliance	238,285	62.50%	14	141,283	70.12%	8	182,076	64.30%	12	2	561,644	64.86%	36
United National Party	139,168	36.51%	9	58,327	28.95%	4	94,448	33.35%	6		291,943	33.72%	19
Independents	361	0.09%	0	409	0.20%	0	4,615	1.63%	0		5,385	0.62%	0
United Socialist Party	2,278	0.60%	0	1,004	0.50%	0	534	0.19%	0		3,816	0.44%	0
United Lalith Front	472	0.12%	0				348	0.12%	0		820	0.09%	0
Sinhalaye Mahasammatha Bhoomiputra Pakshaya	411	0.11%	0	78	0.04%	0	182	0.06%	0		671	0.08%	0
People's Liberation Solidarity Front							617	0.22%	0		617	0.07%	0
United Sinhala Great Council	159	0.04%	0	56	0.03%	0	172	0.06%	0		387	0.04%	0
National Development Front				267	0.13%	0					267	0.03%	0
Liberal Party							186	0.07%	0		186	0.02%	0
Ruhuna People's Party	94	0.02%	0								94	0.01%	0
Sri Lanka Progressive Front				43	0.02%	0					43	0.00%	0
Sri Lanka National Front				29	0.01%	0					29	0.00%	0
Valid Votes	381,228	100.00%	23	201,496	100.00%	12	283,178	100.00%	18	2	865,902	100.00%	55
Rejected Votes	23,633			13,725			16,992				54,350		
Total Polled	404,861			215,221			300,170				920,252		
Registered Electors	716,609			384,361			551,506				1,652,476		
Turnout	56.50%			55.99%			54.43%				55.69%		

=== Uva Province ===
Results of the 4th Uva provincial council election held on 10 July 2004:

Party / Alliance	Badulla			Monaragala			Bonus Seats	Total		
Party / Alliance	Votes	%	Seats	Votes	%	Seats	Bonus Seats	Votes	%	Seats
United People's Freedom Alliance	169,197	55.48%	12	97,878	66.24%	7	2	267,075	58.99%	21
United National Party	119,171	39.08%	8	48,930	33.12%	4		168,101	37.13%	12
Up-Country People's Front	12,759	4.18%	1					12,759	2.82%	1
United Socialist Party	2,364	0.78%	0	616	0.42%	0		2,980	0.66%	0
National Development Front	523	0.17%	0					523	0.12%	0
Sri Lanka Muslim Party	468	0.15%	0					468	0.10%	0
Independents	231	0.08%	0	117	0.08%	0		348	0.08%	0
Sinhalaye Mahasammatha Bhoomiputra Pakshaya	246	0.08%	0	65	0.04%	0		311	0.07%	0
Democratic United National Front				55	0.04%	0		55	0.01%	0
Sri Lanka National Front				39	0.03%	0		39	0.01%	0
United Sinhala Great Council				33	0.02%	0		33	0.01%	0
Sri Lanka Progressive Front				20	0.01%	0		20	0.00%	0
Valid Votes	304,959	100.00%	21	147,753	100.00%	11	2	452,712	100.00%	34
Rejected Votes	25,628			10,831				36,459		
Total Polled	330,587			158,584				489,171		
Registered Electors	511,115			262,742				773,857		
Turnout	64.68%			60.36%				63.21%		

=== Western Province ===
Results of the 4th Western provincial council election held on 10 July 2004:

Party / Alliance	Colombo			Gampaha			Kalutara			Bonus Seats	Total		
Party / Alliance	Votes	%	Seats	Votes	%	Seats	Votes	%	Seats	Bonus Seats	Votes	%	Seats
United People's Freedom Alliance	322,653	49.11%	21	392,881	61.35%	24	224,914	57.27%	12	2	940,448	55.65%	59
United National Party	276,759	42.12%	18	218,903	34.19%	14	141,336	35.99%	7		636,998	37.69%	39
Sri Lanka Muslim Congress	31,184	4.75%	2	16,621	2.60%	1	22,926	5.84%	1		70,731	4.19%	4
Western People's Front	12,219	1.86%	1	2,798	0.44%	0					15,017	0.89%	1
Democratic Unity Alliance	6,219	0.95%	1								6,219	0.37%	1
Sinhalaye Mahasammatha Bhoomiputra Pakshaya	2,194	0.33%	0	2,564	0.40%	0					4,758	0.28%	0
National Development Front	1,337	0.20%	0	2,361	0.37%	0	872	0.22%	0		4,570	0.27%	0
United Socialist Party				2,419	0.38%	0	2,125	0.54%	0		4,544	0.27%	0
New Left Front	3,024	0.46%	0								3,024	0.18%	0
Independents	251	0.04%	0	1,262	0.20%	0	525	0.13%	0		2,038	0.12%	0
United Lalith Front	771	0.12%	0				0	0.00%	0		771	0.05%	0
United Sinhala Great Council	276	0.04%	0	236	0.04%	0					512	0.03%	0
Sri Lanka Progressive Front				159	0.02%	0					159	0.01%	0
Liberal Party				142	0.02%	0					142	0.01%	0
Sri Lanka National Front	113	0.02%	0								113	0.01%	0
Valid Votes	657,000	100.00%	43	640,346	100.00%	39	392,698	100.00%	20	2	1,690,044	100.00%	104
Rejected Votes	45,004			38,790			26,625				110,419		
Total Polled	702,004			679,136			419,323				1,800,463		
Registered Electors	1,467,751			1,327,145			746,138				3,541,034		
Turnout	47.83%			51.17%			56.20%				50.85%		
