= 1999 Sri Lankan provincial council elections =

3rd Sri Lankan provincial council election
- 25 January 1999, 6 April 1999, 10 June 1999

380 seats across 7 provincial councils
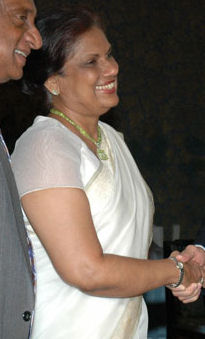

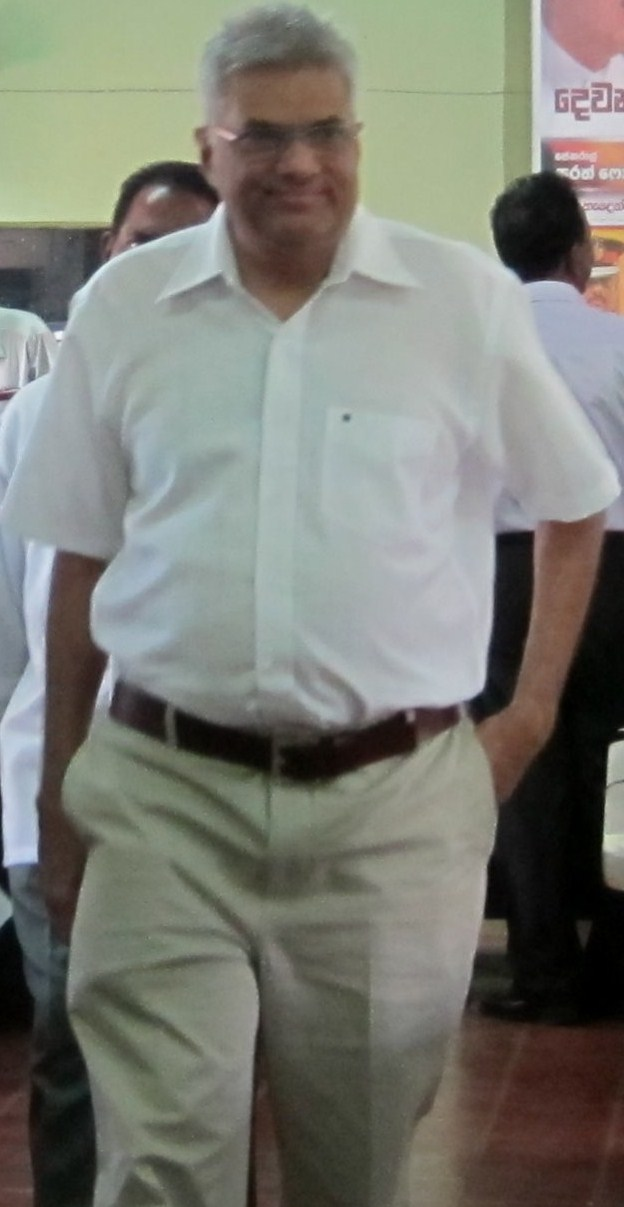

	First party	Second party	Third party
Leader	Chandrika Kumaratunga	Ranil Wickremasinghe	Somawansa Amarasinghe
Party	People's Alliance	UNP	JVP
Popular vote	3,133,658	2,761,864	417,168
Percentage	46.88%	41.31%	6.24%
Councillors	187	152	25
Councils	2	0	0

The 1999 Sri Lankan provincial council election was held on 25 January 1999, 6 April 1999 and 10 June 1999 to elect members to seven provincial councils in Sri Lanka. No election was held in the eighth province, North Eastern, which had been governed directly by the national government since March 1990. The People's Alliance, which was in power nationally, won the majority of seats in two provinces (North Central and North Western). It was also able to form a majority administration in the other five provinces with the support of smaller parties such as the Ceylon Workers' Congress.

== Background ==
In an attempt to end the Sri Lankan Civil War, the Indo-Lanka Accord was signed on 29 July 1987. One of the requirements of the accord was that the Sri Lankan government to devolve powers to the provinces. Accordingly, on 14 November 1987, the Sri Lankan Parliament passed the 13th Amendment to the 1978 Constitution of Sri Lanka and the Provincial Councils Act No 42 of 1987. On 3 February 1988, nine provincial councils were created by order. The first elections for provincial councils took place on 28 April 1988 in North Central, North Western, Sabaragamuwa, and Uva provinces. On 2 June 1988, elections were held for provincial councils for Central, Southern and Western provinces. The United National Party (UNP), which was in power nationally, won control of all seven provincial councils.

The Indo-Lanka Accord also required the merger of the Eastern and Northern provinces into one administrative unit. The accord required a referendum to be held by 31 December 1988, in the Eastern Province to decide whether the merger should be permanent. Crucially, the accord allowed the Sri Lankan president to postpone the referendum at his discretion. On September 2 and 8 1988, President Jayewardene issued proclamations enabling the Eastern and Northern provinces to be one administrative unit administered by one elected council, creating the North Eastern Province. Elections in the newly merged North Eastern Province were held on 19 November 1988. The Eelam People's Revolutionary Liberation Front, an Indian backed paramilitary group, won control of the North Eastern provincial council.

On 1 March 1990, just as the Indian Peace Keeping Force were preparing to withdraw from Sri Lanka, Annamalai Varatharajah Perumal, Chief Minister of the North Eastern Province, moved a motion in the North Eastern Provincial Council declaring an independent Eelam. President Premadasa reacted to Permual's UDI by dissolving the provincial council and imposing direct rule on the province.

The 2nd Sri Lankan provincial council election was held in 1993 in seven provinces. The UNP retained control of six provincial councils but lost control of the largest provincial council, Western, to the opposition People's Alliance. A special election was held in Southern Province in 1994 after some UNP provincial councillors defected to the opposition. The PA won the election and took control of the Southern Provincial Council.

== Results ==
The PA, which was now in power nationally, managed to win the majority of seats in two provinces (North Central and North Western). It was also able to form a majority administration in the other five provinces with the support of smaller parties such as the Ceylon Workers' Congress.

=== Overall ===
Party / Alliance	Votes	%	Seats
People's Alliance^{1}	3,133,658	46.88%	187
United National Party	2,761,864	41.31%	152
Janatha Vimukthi Peramuna	417,168	6.24%	25
National Union of Workers (CWC, DWC)	145,350	2.17%	9
Mahajana Eksath Peramuna	87,165	1.30%	3
New Left Front	63,578	0.95%	1
Up-Country People's Front	25,369	0.38%	2
Independents	22,494	0.34%	0
Muslim United Liberation Front	10,051	0.15%	0
Sri Lanka Muslim Congress^{1}	7,230	0.11%	1
Liberal Party	5,329	0.08%	0
Sri Lanka Progressive Front	2,557	0.04%	0
Sinhalaye Mahasammatha Bhoomiputra Pakshaya	1,540	0.02%	0
People's Liberation Solidarity Front	1,216	0.02%	0
People's Freedom Front	340	0.01%	0
Valid Votes	6,684,909	100.00%	380
Rejected Votes			
Total Polled			
Registered Electors	9,991,293		
Turnout			
1. SLMC contested separately in Kalutara District, and with the PA in other districts.

=== Central Province ===
Results of the 3rd Central provincial council election held on 6 April 1999:

Party / Alliance	Kandy			Matale			Nuwara Eliya			Bonus Seats	Total		
Party / Alliance	Votes	%	Seats	Votes	%	Seats	Votes	%	Seats	Bonus Seats	Votes	%	Seats
People's Alliance	247,250	47.54%		95,115	51.38%		79,264	29.18%		2	421,629	43.17%	26
United National Party	232,934	44.79%		70,705	38.20%		88,020	32.41%			391,659	40.10%	23
National Union of Workers (CWC)	16,954	3.26%		9,306	5.03%		69,441	25.57%			95,701	9.80%	6
Janatha Vimukthi Peramuna	16,065	3.09%	1	8,010	4.33%		4,909	1.81%			28,984	2.97%	1
Up-Country People's Front							22,896	8.43%	2		22,896	2.34%	2
Mahajana Eksath Peramuna	4,433	0.85%		1,453	0.78%		811	0.30%			6,697	0.69%	0
Independents	853	0.16%		516	0.28%		2,731	1.01%			4,100	0.42%	0
New Left Front							3,541	1.30%			3,541	0.36%	0
Liberal Party	881	0.17%									881	0.09%	0
Sri Lanka Progressive Front	689	0.13%									689	0.07%	0
Valid Votes	520,059	100.00%		185,105	100.00%		271,613	100.00%		2	976,777	100.00%	58
Rejected Votes	45,000			16,257			30,853				92,110		
Total Polled	565,059			201,362			302,466				1,068,887		
Registered Electors	780,232			281,089			391,585				1,452,906		
Turnout	72.42%			71.64%			77.24%				73.57%		

=== North Central Province ===
Results of the 3rd North Central provincial council election held on 6 April 1999:

Party / Alliance	Anuradhapura			Polonnaruwa			Bonus Seats	Total		
Party / Alliance	Votes	%	Seats	Votes	%	Seats	Bonus Seats	Votes	%	Seats
People's Alliance	156,291	54.09%		75,466	52.01%		2	231,757	53.39%	19
United National Party	111,285	38.51%		60,022	41.37%			171,307	39.46%	12
Janatha Vimukthi Peramuna	14,197	4.91%		8,498	5.86%			22,695	5.23%	2
New Left Front	4,259	1.47%						4,259	0.98%	0
Mahajana Eksath Peramuna	1,150	0.40%		394	0.27%			1,544	0.36%	0
Independents	861	0.30%						861	0.20%	0
Muslim United Liberation Front	798	0.28%						798	0.18%	0
Liberal Party				388	0.27%			388	0.09%	0
Sinhalaye Mahasammatha Bhoomiputra Pakshaya				334	0.23%			334	0.08%	0
Sri Lanka Progressive Front	131	0.05%						131	0.03%	0
Valid Votes	288,972	100.00%		145,102	100.00%		2	434,074	100.00%	33
Rejected Votes	22,153			10,255				32,408		
Total Polled	311,125			155,357				466,482		
Registered Electors	448,098			217,318				665,416		
Turnout	69.43%			71.49%				70.10%		

=== North Western Province ===
Results of the 3rd North Western provincial council election held on 25 January 1999:

Party / Alliance	Kurunegala			Puttalam			Bonus Seats	Total		
Party / Alliance	Votes	%	Seats	Votes	%	Seats	Bonus Seats	Votes	%	Seats
People's Alliance	405,431	56.16%	20	160,722	56.97%	8	2	566,153	56.39%	30
United National Party	273,892	37.94%	13	105,876	37.53%	6		379,768	37.82%	19
Janatha Vimukthi Peramuna	31,221	4.32%	2	10,759	3.81%	1		41,980	4.18%	3
New Left Front	9,456	1.31%	0	3,361	1.19%	0		12,817	1.28%	0
Muslim United Liberation Front	971	0.13%	0	542	0.19%	0		1,513	0.15%	0
Liberal Party	676	0.09%	0	202	0.07%	0		878	0.09%	0
Independents	309	0.04%	0	540	0.19%	0		849	0.08%	0
Sri Lanka Progressive Front				126	0.04%	0		126	0.01%	0
Valid Votes	721,956	100.00%	35	282,128	100.00%	15	2	1,004,084	100.00%	52
Rejected Votes										
Total Polled										
Registered Electors	960,241			398,055				1,358,296		
Turnout										

=== Sabaragamuwa Province ===
Results of the 3rd Sabaragamuwa provincial council election held on 6 April 1999:

Party / Alliance	Kegalle			Ratnapura			Bonus Seats	Total		
Party / Alliance	Votes	%	Seats	Votes	%	Seats	Bonus Seats	Votes	%	Seats
People's Alliance	165,041	47.70%		191,502	47.92%		2	356,543	47.82%	22
United National Party	158,503	45.81%		175,912	44.02%			334,415	44.85%	19
Janatha Vimukthi Peramuna	15,537	4.49%	1	17,200	4.30%	1		32,737	4.39%	2
National Union of Workers (CWC)	4,351	1.26%		7,586	1.90%			11,937	1.60%	1
New Left Front				5,047	1.26%			5,047	0.68%	0
Mahajana Eksath Peramuna	1,552	0.45%		1,624	0.41%			3,176	0.43%	0
Liberal Party	983	0.28%						983	0.13%	0
Independents				592	0.15%			592	0.08%	0
Sri Lanka Progressive Front				194	0.05%			194	0.03%	0
Valid Votes	345,967	100.00%		399,657	100.00%		2	745,624	100.00%	44
Rejected Votes	23,749			29,362				53,111		
Total Polled	369,716			429,019				798,735		
Registered Electors	528,107			584,998				1,113,105		
Turnout	70.01%			73.34%				71.76%		

=== Southern Province ===
Results of the 4th Southern provincial council election held on 10 June 1999:

Party / Alliance	Galle			Hambantota			Matara			Bonus Seats	Total		
Party / Alliance	Votes	%	Seats	Votes	%	Seats	Votes	%	Seats	Bonus Seats	Votes	%	Seats
People's Alliance	214,714	46.70%	11	89,483	39.11%	6	157,762	46.36%	8	2	461,959	44.90%	27
United National Party	188,921	41.09%	9	82,786	36.19%	5	130,843	38.45%	7		402,550	39.13%	21
Janatha Vimukthi Peramuna	38,817	8.44%	2	47,296	20.67%	3	40,276	11.84%	2		126,389	12.28%	7
Independents	5,120	1.11%	0	2,824	1.23%	0	6,041	1.78%	0		13,985	1.36%	0
New Left Front	4,981	1.08%	0	4,869	2.13%	0	2,906	0.85%	0		12,756	1.24%	0
Mahajana Eksath Peramuna	5,496	1.20%	0	1,044	0.46%	0	1,160	0.34%	0		7,700	0.75%	0
People's Liberation Solidarity Front	444	0.10%	0	324	0.14%	0	448	0.13%	0		1,216	0.12%	0
Liberal Party	340	0.07%	0	150	0.07%	0	298	0.09%	0		788	0.08%	0
Muslim United Liberation Front	739	0.16%	0								739	0.07%	0
Sinhalaye Mahasammatha Bhoomiputra Pakshaya							399	0.12%	0		399	0.04%	0
People's Freedom Front	197	0.04%	0				143	0.04%	0		340	0.03%	0
Valid Votes	459,769	100.00%	22	228,776	100.00%	14	340,276	100.00%	17	2	1,028,821	100.00%	55
Rejected Votes													
Total Polled													
Registered Electors	652,734			342,498			510,310				1,505,542		

=== Uva Province ===
Results of the 3rd Uva provincial council election held on 6 April 1999:

Party / Alliance	Badulla			Monaragala			Bonus Seats	Total		
Party / Alliance	Votes	%	Seats	Votes	%	Seats	Bonus Seats	Votes	%	Seats
People's Alliance	140,293	44.69%		66,870	45.35%		2	207,163	44.90%	17
United National Party	137,437	43.78%		65,340	44.31%			202,777	43.95%	14
Janatha Vimukthi Peramuna	12,106	3.86%		10,292	6.98%			22,398	4.85%	2
National Union of Workers (CWC)	19,224	6.12%		1,927	1.31%			21,151	4.58%	1
Mahajana Eksath Peramuna	1,980	0.63%		419	0.28%			2,399	0.52%	0
Up-Country People's Front	2,473	0.79%						2,473	0.54%	0
New Left Front				2,182	1.48%			2,182	0.47%	0
Independents	407	0.13%		374	0.25%			781	0.17%	0
Sri Lanka Progressive Front				50	0.03%			50	0.01%	0
Valid Votes	313,920	100.00%		147,454	100.00%		2	461,374	100.00%	34
Rejected Votes	29,396			13,976				43,372		
Total Polled	343,316			161,430				504,746		
Registered Electors	454,913			224,077				678,990		
Turnout	75.47%			72.04%				74.34%		

=== Western Province ===
Results of the 3rd Western provincial council election held on 6 April 1999:

Party / Alliance	Colombo			Gampaha			Kalutara			Bonus Seats	Total		
Party / Alliance	Votes	%	Seats	Votes	%	Seats	Votes	%	Seats	Bonus Seats	Votes	%	Seats
People's Alliance	313,576	38.98%	17	376,176	48.30%	17	198,702	44.08%	10	2	888,454	43.68%	46
United National Party	362,636	45.07%	19	317,698	40.79%	15	199,054	44.16%	10		879,388	43.23%	44
Janatha Vimukthi Peramuna	55,361	6.88%	3	58,277	7.48%	3	28,347	6.29%	2		141,985	6.98%	8
Mahajana Eksath Peramuna	43,008	5.35%	2	15,492	1.99%	1	7,149	1.59%	0		65,649	3.23%	3
New Left Front	9,140	1.14%	1	8,409	1.08%	0	5,427	1.20%	0		22,976	1.13%	1
National Union of Workers (DWC)	12,510	1.55%	1				4,051	0.90%	0		16,561	0.81%	1
Sri Lanka Muslim Congress							7,230	1.60%	1		7,230	0.36%	1
Muslim United Liberation Front	5,087	0.63%	0	1,347	0.17%	0	567	0.13%	0		7,001	0.34%	0
Liberal Party	1,411	0.18%	0								1,411	0.07%	0
Sri Lanka Progressive Front	495	0.06%	0	663	0.09%	0	209	0.05%	0		1,367	0.07%	0
Independents	1,326	0.16%	0								1,326	0.07%	0
Sinhalaye Mahasammatha Bhoomiputra Pakshaya				807	0.10%	0					807	0.04%	0
Valid Votes	804,550	100.00%	43	778,869	100.00%	36	450,736	100.00%	23	2	2,034,155	100.00%	104
Rejected Votes	50,435			48,262			28,441				127,138		
Total Polled	854,985			827,131			479,177				2,161,293		
Registered Electors	1,326,487			1,213,589			676,962				3,217,038		
Turnout	64.45%			68.16%			70.78%				67.18%		
