= Kins Nelson =

Sri Lankan politician

Hon. Kins Nelson MP
- කින්ස් නෙල්සන් கின்ஸ் நெல்சன்

Member of the Parliament of Sri Lanka
- Incumbent
- Assumed office 2020
- Constituency: Polonnaruwa District

Member of the North Central Provincial Council
- In office 2004–2017
- Constituency: Polonnaruwa District

Personal details
- Born: Hewa Gajaman Paththinige Kins Kumara Nelson; 29 October 1973 (age 52)
- Party: United National Party
- Other political affiliations: Samagi Jana Balawegaya

Hewa Gajaman Paththinige Kins Kumara Nelson (born 29 October 1973) is a Sri Lankan politician, former provincial councillor and Member of Parliament.

Nelson was born on 29 October 1973. He is the son of former government minister H. G. P. Nelson and brother in law of General Shavendra Silva. He was a member of the North Central Provincial Council. He defected to the government in December 2014 to support United People's Freedom Alliance (UPFA) candidate Mahinda Rajapaksa in the presidential election.

Nelson contested the 2015 parliamentary election as one of the UPFA's candidates in Polonnaruwa District but failed to get elected after coming 3rd amongst the UPFA candidates. He contested the 2020 parliamentary election as a Samagi Jana Balawegaya electoral alliance candidate in Polonnaruwa District and was elected to the Parliament of Sri Lanka.

Electoral history of Kins Nelson
Election	Constituency	Party	Alliance	Votes	Result
2004 provincial	Polonnaruwa District	United National Party		21,100	Elected
2008 provincial	Polonnaruwa District	United National Party			Elected
2012 provincial	Polonnaruwa District	United National Party		34,341	Elected
2015 parliamentary	Polonnaruwa District		United People's Freedom Alliance	52,231	Not elected
2020 parliamentary	Polonnaruwa District	United National Party	Samagi Jana Balawegaya	22,392	Elected
