= NSSP =

NSSP may refer to:

- Nava Sama Samaja Party, a Trotskyist political party in Sri Lanka
- Next Steps in Strategic Partnership, a military cooperation agreement between the US and India
