= Medirigiriya Polling Division =

Medirigiriya
- Polling Division
- Coordinates: 8.128672°N 81.033933°E
- Country: Sri Lanka
- Province: North Central Province, Sri Lanka
- Electoral District: Polonnaruwa Electoral District

Area
  - Total: 740.87 km^{2} (286.05 sq mi)

Population (2012)
  - Total: 102,027
  - Density: 138/km^{2} (360/sq mi)
- ISO 3166 code: EC-18B

The Medirigiriya Polling Division is a Polling Division in the Polonnaruwa Electoral District, in the North Central Province, Sri Lanka.

== Presidential Election Results ==
=== Summary ===
The winner of Medirigiriya polling division has matched the final national result in every presidential election. Hence, Medirigiriya is a bellwether for Sri Lankan presidential elections.

Year	Medirigiriya	Polonnaruwa Electoral District	MAE %	Sri Lanka	MAE %
2019	SLPP	SLPP	1.80%	SLPP	0.81%
2015	NDF	NDF	3.92%	NDF	2.43%
2010	UPFA	UPFA	1.21%	UPFA	5.48%
2005	UPFA	UPFA	1.57%	UPFA	0.65%
1999	PA	PA	1.27%	PA	0.82%
1994	PA	PA	2.22%	PA	5.46%
1988	UNP	UNP	8.42%	UNP	12.01%
1982	UNP	UNP	1.58%	UNP	5.05%
Matches/Mean MAE	8/8	8/8	2.75%	8/8	4.09%

=== 2019 Sri Lankan Presidential Election ===
Party	Medirigiriya		Polonnaruwa Electoral District		Sri Lanka	
Party	Votes	%	Votes	%	Votes	%
SLPP	34,022	51.44%	147,340	53.01%	6,924,255	52.25%
NDF	28,324	42.82%	112,473	40.47%	5,564,239	41.99%
NMPP	2,734	4.13%	12,284	4.42%	418,553	3.16%
Other Parties (with < 1%)	1,064	1.61%	5,827	2.10%	345,452	2.61%
Valid Votes	66,144	99.37%	277,924	99.09%	13,252,499	98.99%
Rejected Votes	417	0.63%	2,563	0.91%	135,452	1.01%
Total Polled	66,561	85.89%	280,487	85.92%	13,387,951	83.71%
Registered Electors	77,499		326,443		15,992,568	

=== 2015 Sri Lankan Presidential Election ===
Party	Medirigiriya		Polonnaruwa Electoral District		Sri Lanka	
Party	Votes	%	Votes	%	Votes	%
NDF	32,875	53.89%	147,974	57.80%	6,217,162	51.28%
UPFA	27,623	45.28%	105,640	41.27%	5,768,090	47.58%
Other Parties (with < 1%)	509	0.83%	2,382	0.93%	138,200	1.14%
Valid Votes	61,007	99.50%	255,996	99.31%	12,123,452	98.85%
Rejected Votes	307	0.50%	1,790	0.69%	140,925	1.15%
Total Polled	61,314	79.11%	257,786	80.22%	12,264,377	78.69%
Registered Electors	77,505		321,338		15,585,942	

=== 2010 Sri Lankan Presidential Election ===
Party	Medirigiriya		Polonnaruwa Electoral District		Sri Lanka	
Party	Votes	%	Votes	%	Votes	%
UPFA	34,613	63.74%	144,889	64.92%	6,015,934	57.88%
NDF	18,979	34.95%	75,026	33.62%	4,173,185	40.15%
Other Parties (with < 1%)	710	1.31%	3,260	1.46%	204,494	1.97%
Valid Votes	54,302	99.49%	223,175	99.34%	10,393,613	99.03%
Rejected Votes	281	0.51%	1,472	0.66%	101,838	0.97%
Total Polled	54,583	75.39%	224,647	76.26%	10,495,451	66.70%
Registered Electors	72,402		294,583		15,734,587	

=== 2005 Sri Lankan Presidential Election ===
Party	Medirigiriya		Polonnaruwa Electoral District		Sri Lanka	
Party	Votes	%	Votes	%	Votes	%
UPFA	27,230	51.00%	110,499	52.61%	4,887,152	50.29%
UNP	25,533	47.83%	97,142	46.25%	4,706,366	48.43%
Other Parties (with < 1%)	625	1.17%	2,389	1.14%	123,521	1.27%
Valid Votes	53,388	99.25%	210,030	99.06%	9,717,039	98.88%
Rejected Votes	402	0.75%	2,002	0.94%	109,869	1.12%
Total Polled	53,790	77.70%	212,032	78.07%	9,826,908	69.51%
Registered Electors	69,230		271,609		14,136,979	

=== 1999 Sri Lankan Presidential Election ===
Party	Medirigiriya		Polonnaruwa Electoral District		Sri Lanka	
Party	Votes	%	Votes	%	Votes	%
PA	23,395	50.72%	88,663	51.55%	4,312,157	51.12%
UNP	20,345	44.10%	72,598	42.21%	3,602,748	42.71%
JVP	1,709	3.70%	8,020	4.66%	343,927	4.08%
Other Parties (with < 1%)	680	1.47%	2,726	1.58%	176,679	2.09%
Valid Votes	46,129	98.43%	172,007	98.20%	8,435,754	97.69%
Rejected Votes	736	1.57%	3,151	1.80%	199,536	2.31%
Total Polled	46,865	77.89%	175,158	78.11%	8,635,290	72.17%
Registered Electors	60,171		224,239		11,965,536	

=== 1994 Sri Lankan Presidential Election ===
Party	Medirigiriya		Polonnaruwa Electoral District		Sri Lanka	
Party	Votes	%	Votes	%	Votes	%
PA	23,977	56.86%	88,907	59.08%	4,709,205	62.28%
UNP	17,588	41.71%	59,287	39.40%	2,715,283	35.91%
Other Parties (with < 1%)	603	1.43%	2,281	1.52%	137,040	1.81%
Valid Votes	42,168	97.76%	150,475	97.43%	7,561,526	98.03%
Rejected Votes	965	2.24%	3,966	2.57%	151,706	1.97%
Total Polled	43,133	78.05%	154,441	75.73%	7,713,232	69.12%
Registered Electors	55,264		203,940		11,158,880	

=== 1988 Sri Lankan Presidential Election ===
Party	Medirigiriya		Polonnaruwa Electoral District		Sri Lanka	
Party	Votes	%	Votes	%	Votes	%
UNP	6,592	64.31%	26,392	55.54%	2,569,199	50.43%
SLFP	3,497	34.12%	20,173	42.45%	2,289,857	44.95%
SLMP	161	1.57%	957	2.01%	235,701	4.63%
Valid Votes	10,250	95.81%	47,522	97.62%	5,094,754	98.24%
Rejected Votes	448	4.19%	1,157	2.38%	91,499	1.76%
Total Polled	10,698	21.95%	48,679	29.64%	5,186,256	55.87%
Registered Electors	48,728		164,213		9,283,143	

=== 1982 Sri Lankan Presidential Election ===
Party	Medirigiriya		Polonnaruwa Electoral District		Sri Lanka	
Party	Votes	%	Votes	%	Votes	%
UNP	20,324	58.03%	59,414	56.26%	3,450,815	52.93%
SLFP	11,777	33.63%	37,243	35.26%	2,546,348	39.05%
JVP	2,736	7.81%	8,138	7.71%	273,428	4.19%
Other Parties (with < 1%)	186	0.53%	820	0.78%	249,460	3.83%
Valid Votes	35,023	99.12%	105,615	99.00%	6,520,156	98.78%
Rejected Votes	312	0.88%	1,064	1.00%	80,470	1.22%
Total Polled	35,335	81.72%	106,679	82.81%	6,600,626	80.15%
Registered Electors	43,240		128,822		8,235,358	

== Parliamentary Election Results ==
=== Summary ===
Year	Medirigiriya	Polonnaruwa Electoral District	MAE %	Sri Lanka	MAE %
2015	UNP	UNP	0.54%	UNP	3.02%
2010	UPFA	UPFA	3.50%	UPFA	3.90%
2004	UPFA	UPFA	2.27%	UPFA	6.83%
2001	UNP	UNP	1.85%	UNP	3.07%
2000	UNP	UNP	0.62%	PA	3.19%
1994	PA	PA	1.73%	PA	2.83%
1989	UNP	UNP	7.07%	UNP	11.47%
Matches/Mean MAE	6/7	6/7	2.51%	7/7	4.90%

=== 2015 Sri Lankan Parliamentary Election ===
Party	Medirigiriya		Polonnaruwa Electoral District		Sri Lanka	
Party	Votes	%	Votes	%	Votes	%
UNP	28,256	50.26%	118,845	50.30%	5,098,916	45.77%
UPFA	25,151	44.74%	103,172	43.67%	4,732,664	42.48%
JVP	2,647	4.71%	13,497	5.71%	544,154	4.88%
Other Parties (with < 1%)	162	0.29%	765	0.32%	44,633	0.40%
Valid Votes	56,216	96.63%	236,279	96.39%	11,140,333	95.35%
Rejected Votes	1,919	3.30%	8,654	3.53%	516,926	4.42%
Total Polled	58,176	75.06%	245,116	79.81%	11,684,111	77.66%
Registered Electors	77,505		307,125		15,044,490	

=== 2010 Sri Lankan Parliamentary Election ===
Party	Medirigiriya		Polonnaruwa Electoral District		Sri Lanka	
Party	Votes	%	Votes	%	Votes	%
UPFA	26,794	65.86%	118,694	69.25%	4,846,388	60.38%
UNP	12,572	30.90%	45,732	26.68%	2,357,057	29.37%
DNA	1,199	2.95%	6,457	3.77%	441,251	5.50%
Other Parties (with < 1%)	116	0.29%	515	0.30%	53,515	0.67%
Valid Votes	40,681	91.80%	171,398	92.02%	8,026,322	96.03%
Rejected Votes	3,613	8.15%	14,798	7.94%	581,465	6.96%
Total Polled	44,313	61.20%	186,269	63.10%	8,358,246	59.29%
Registered Electors	72,402		295,186		14,097,690	

=== 2004 Sri Lankan Parliamentary Election ===
Party	Medirigiriya		Polonnaruwa Electoral District		Sri Lanka	
Party	Votes	%	Votes	%	Votes	%
UPFA	26,114	55.26%	106,243	57.36%	4,223,126	45.70%
UNP	20,522	43.42%	75,664	40.85%	3,486,792	37.73%
Other Parties (with < 1%)	624	1.32%	3,303	1.78%	607,063	6.57%
Valid Votes	47,260	93.94%	185,210	93.57%	9,241,931	94.52%
Rejected Votes	3,035	6.03%	12,673	6.40%	534,452	5.47%
Total Polled	50,311	75.54%	197,934	77.91%	9,777,821	75.74%
Registered Electors	66,605		254,061		12,909,631	

=== 2001 Sri Lankan Parliamentary Election ===
Party	Medirigiriya		Polonnaruwa Electoral District		Sri Lanka	
Party	Votes	%	Votes	%	Votes	%
UNP	24,450	50.44%	86,786	47.82%	4,086,026	45.62%
PA	19,149	39.50%	73,679	40.60%	3,330,815	37.19%
JVP	4,355	8.98%	18,956	10.44%	815,353	9.10%
Other Parties (with < 1%)	524	1.08%	2,076	1.14%	118,404	1.32%
Valid Votes	48,478	95.28%	181,497	93.87%	8,955,844	94.77%
Rejected Votes	2,401	4.72%	11,854	6.13%	494,009	5.23%
Total Polled	50,879	80.10%	193,351	80.41%	9,449,878	76.03%
Registered Electors	63,518		240,444		12,428,762	

=== 2000 Sri Lankan Parliamentary Election ===
Party	Medirigiriya		Polonnaruwa Electoral District		Sri Lanka	
Party	Votes	%	Votes	%	Votes	%
UNP	22,213	47.30%	82,399	46.33%	3,451,765	40.12%
PA	21,075	44.88%	80,023	44.99%	3,899,329	45.33%
JVP	2,135	4.55%	11,161	6.27%	518,725	6.03%
NUA	1,048	2.23%	1,977	1.11%	185,593	2.16%
Other Parties (with < 1%)	486	1.03%	2,311	1.30%	239,322	2.78%
Valid Votes	46,957	N/A	177,871	N/A	8,602,617	N/A

=== 1994 Sri Lankan Parliamentary Election ===
Party	Medirigiriya		Polonnaruwa Electoral District		Sri Lanka	
Party	Votes	%	Votes	%	Votes	%
PA	22,287	49.69%	82,438	51.18%	3,887,805	48.94%
UNP	22,261	49.63%	76,706	47.62%	3,498,370	44.04%
Other Parties (with < 1%)	308	0.69%	1,934	1.20%	90,078	1.13%
Valid Votes	44,856	96.50%	161,078	96.16%	7,943,688	95.20%
Rejected Votes	1,626	3.50%	6,434	3.84%	400,395	4.80%
Total Polled	46,482	84.11%	167,512	82.06%	8,344,095	74.75%
Registered Electors	55,264		204,138		11,163,064	

=== 1989 Sri Lankan Parliamentary Election ===
Party	Medirigiriya		Polonnaruwa Electoral District		Sri Lanka	
Party	Votes	%	Votes	%	Votes	%
UNP	8,631	70.57%	43,473	62.33%	2,838,005	50.71%
SLFP	3,384	27.67%	23,221	33.29%	1,785,369	31.90%
ELJP	148	1.21%	1,933	2.77%	67,723	1.21%
Other Parties (with < 1%)	67	0.55%	1,117	1.60%	141,983	2.54%
Valid Votes	12,230	92.73%	69,744	92.98%	5,596,468	93.87%
Rejected Votes	959	7.27%	5,266	7.02%	365,563	6.13%
Total Polled	13,189	27.21%	75,010	45.81%	5,962,031	63.60%
Registered Electors	48,477		163,745		9,374,164	

== Demographics ==
=== Ethnicity ===
The Medirigiriya Polling Division has a Sinhalese majority (88.6%) and a significant Moor population (11.3%) . In comparison, the Polonnaruwa Electoral District (which contains the Medirigiriya Polling Division) has a Sinhalese majority (90.7%)

Ethnicity in Medirigiriya
1. Sinhalese (88.6%)
2. Moor (11.3%)
3. Other (0.10%)

=== Religion ===
The Medirigiriya Polling Division has a Buddhist majority (88.1%) and a significant Muslim population (11.3%) . In comparison, the Polonnaruwa Electoral District (which contains the Medirigiriya Polling Division) has a Buddhist majority (89.7%)

Religion in Medirigiriya
1. Buddhist (88.1%)
2. Muslim (11.3%)
3. Other (0.50%)
