= Minneriya Polling Division =

Minneriya
- Polling Division
- Coordinates: 7.996259°N 80.895884°E
- Country: Sri Lanka
- Province: North Central Province, Sri Lanka
- Electoral District: Polonnaruwa Electoral District

Area
  - Total: 1,063.31 km^{2} (410.55 sq mi)

Population (2012)
  - Total: 108,204
  - Density: 102/km^{2} (260/sq mi)
- ISO 3166 code: EC-18A

The Minneriya Polling Division is a Polling Division in the Polonnaruwa Electoral District, in the North Central Province, Sri Lanka.

== Presidential Election Results ==
=== Summary ===
The winner of Minneriya has matched the final country result 8 out of 8 times. Hence, Minneriya is a Perfect Bellwether for Presidential Elections.

Year	Minneriya	Polonnaruwa Electoral District	MAE %	Sri Lanka	MAE %
2019	SLPP	SLPP	5.49%	SLPP	6.61%
2015	NDF	NDF	7.45%	NDF	1.07%
2010	UPFA	UPFA	4.51%	UPFA	11.19%
2005	UPFA	UPFA	3.31%	UPFA	5.53%
1999	PA	PA	1.19%	PA	1.65%
1994	PA	PA	3.00%	PA	0.26%
1988	UNP	UNP	3.22%	UNP	1.05%
1982	UNP	UNP	3.30%	UNP	1.22%
Matches/Mean MAE	8/8	8/8	3.93%	8/8	3.57%

=== 2019 Sri Lankan Presidential Election ===
Party	Minneriya		Polonnaruwa Electoral District		Sri Lanka	
Party	Votes	%	Votes	%	Votes	%
SLPP	41,151	58.65%	147,340	53.01%	6,924,255	52.25%
NDF	24,076	34.31%	112,473	40.47%	5,564,239	41.99%
NMPP	3,271	4.66%	12,284	4.42%	418,553	3.16%
Other Parties (with < 1%)	1,666	2.37%	5,827	2.10%	345,452	2.61%
Valid Votes	70,164	99.21%	277,924	99.09%	13,252,499	98.99%
Rejected Votes	561	0.79%	2,563	0.91%	135,452	1.01%
Total Polled	70,725	84.90%	280,487	85.92%	13,387,951	83.71%
Registered Electors	83,307		326,443		15,992,568	

=== 2015 Sri Lankan Presidential Election ===
Party	Minneriya		Polonnaruwa Electoral District		Sri Lanka	
Party	Votes	%	Votes	%	Votes	%
NDF	32,744	50.22%	147,974	57.80%	6,217,162	51.28%
UPFA	31,747	48.69%	105,640	41.27%	5,768,090	47.58%
Other Parties (with < 1%)	707	1.08%	2,382	0.93%	138,200	1.14%
Valid Votes	65,198	99.25%	255,996	99.31%	12,123,452	98.85%
Rejected Votes	491	0.75%	1,790	0.69%	140,925	1.15%
Total Polled	65,689	78.77%	257,786	80.22%	12,264,377	78.69%
Registered Electors	83,395		321,338		15,585,942	

=== 2010 Sri Lankan Presidential Election ===
Party	Minneriya		Polonnaruwa Electoral District		Sri Lanka	
Party	Votes	%	Votes	%	Votes	%
UPFA	39,587	69.46%	144,889	64.92%	6,015,934	57.88%
NDF	16,517	28.98%	75,026	33.62%	4,173,185	40.15%
Other Parties (with < 1%)	886	1.55%	3,260	1.46%	204,494	1.97%
Valid Votes	56,990	99.39%	223,175	99.34%	10,393,613	99.03%
Rejected Votes	350	0.61%	1,472	0.66%	101,838	0.97%
Total Polled	57,340	74.39%	224,647	76.26%	10,495,451	66.70%
Registered Electors	77,084		294,583		15,734,587	

=== 2005 Sri Lankan Presidential Election ===
Party	Minneriya		Polonnaruwa Electoral District		Sri Lanka	
Party	Votes	%	Votes	%	Votes	%
UPFA	31,081	55.91%	110,499	52.61%	4,887,152	50.29%
UNP	23,819	42.85%	97,142	46.25%	4,706,366	48.43%
Other Parties (with < 1%)	687	1.24%	2,389	1.14%	123,521	1.27%
Valid Votes	55,587	99.04%	210,030	99.06%	9,717,039	98.88%
Rejected Votes	536	0.96%	2,002	0.94%	109,869	1.12%
Total Polled	56,123	77.49%	212,032	78.07%	9,826,908	69.51%
Registered Electors	72,430		271,609		14,136,979	

=== 1999 Sri Lankan Presidential Election ===
Party	Minneriya		Polonnaruwa Electoral District		Sri Lanka	
Party	Votes	%	Votes	%	Votes	%
PA	24,141	52.05%	88,663	51.55%	4,312,157	51.12%
UNP	18,627	40.17%	72,598	42.21%	3,602,748	42.71%
JVP	2,849	6.14%	8,020	4.66%	343,927	4.08%
Other Parties (with < 1%)	759	1.64%	2,726	1.58%	176,679	2.09%
Valid Votes	46,376	98.18%	172,007	98.20%	8,435,754	97.69%
Rejected Votes	859	1.82%	3,151	1.80%	199,536	2.31%
Total Polled	47,235	76.43%	175,158	78.11%	8,635,290	72.17%
Registered Electors	61,803		224,239		11,965,536	

=== 1994 Sri Lankan Presidential Election ===
Party	Minneriya		Polonnaruwa Electoral District		Sri Lanka	
Party	Votes	%	Votes	%	Votes	%
PA	25,779	62.11%	88,907	59.08%	4,709,205	62.28%
UNP	15,079	36.33%	59,287	39.40%	2,715,283	35.91%
Other Parties (with < 1%)	646	1.56%	2,281	1.52%	137,040	1.81%
Valid Votes	41,504	97.18%	150,475	97.43%	7,561,526	98.03%
Rejected Votes	1,204	2.82%	3,966	2.57%	151,706	1.97%
Total Polled	42,708	74.41%	154,441	75.73%	7,713,232	69.12%
Registered Electors	57,393		203,940		11,158,880	

=== 1988 Sri Lankan Presidential Election ===
Party	Minneriya		Polonnaruwa Electoral District		Sri Lanka	
Party	Votes	%	Votes	%	Votes	%
UNP	2,433	51.98%	26,392	55.54%	2,569,199	50.43%
SLFP	2,123	45.35%	20,173	42.45%	2,289,857	44.95%
SLMP	125	2.67%	957	2.01%	235,701	4.63%
Valid Votes	4,681	99.07%	47,522	97.62%	5,094,754	98.24%
Rejected Votes	44	0.93%	1,157	2.38%	91,499	1.76%
Total Polled	4,725	9.43%	48,679	29.64%	5,186,256	55.87%
Registered Electors	50,128		164,213		9,283,143	

=== 1982 Sri Lankan Presidential Election ===
Party	Minneriya		Polonnaruwa Electoral District		Sri Lanka	
Party	Votes	%	Votes	%	Votes	%
UNP	17,728	52.16%	59,414	56.26%	3,450,815	52.93%
SLFP	12,818	37.71%	37,243	35.26%	2,546,348	39.05%
JVP	3,181	9.36%	8,138	7.71%	273,428	4.19%
Other Parties (with < 1%)	262	0.77%	820	0.78%	249,460	3.83%
Valid Votes	33,989	99.08%	105,615	99.00%	6,520,156	98.78%
Rejected Votes	315	0.92%	1,064	1.00%	80,470	1.22%
Total Polled	34,304	85.06%	106,679	82.81%	6,600,626	80.15%
Registered Electors	40,329		128,822		8,235,358	

== Parliamentary Election Results ==
=== Summary ===
The winner of Minneriya has matched the final country result 5 out of 7 times. Hence, Minneriya is a Weak Bellwether for Parliamentary Elections.

Year	Minneriya	Polonnaruwa Electoral District	MAE %	Sri Lanka	MAE %
2020	SLPFA	SLPFA		SLPFA	
2015	UPFA	UNP	5.89%	UNP	3.98%
2010	UPFA	UPFA	3.68%	UPFA	9.61%
2004	UPFA	UPFA	4.73%	UPFA	8.43%
2001	UNP	UNP	2.12%	UNP	2.13%
2000	UNP	UNP	1.09%	PA	3.75%
1994	PA	PA	2.85%	PA	2.56%
1989	UNP	UNP	6.69%	UNP	3.87%
Matches/Mean MAE	5/7	6/7	3.86%	7/7	4.90%

=== 2020 Sri Lankan Parliamentary Election ===
Party	Minneriya		Polonnaruwa Electoral District		Sri Lanka	
Party	Votes	%	Votes	%	Votes	%
SLPFA	46,632	77.07%	180,847	73.66%	6,853,693	59.09%
SJB	9,463	15.64%	47,281	19.46%	2,771,984	23.09%
NPP	1,948	3.22%	6,792	2.77%	445,958	3.84%
UNP	1,577	2.61%	6525	2.66%	249,435	2.15%
Other Parties (with < 1%)	887	1.46%	3574	1.45%	1,27,866	11.02%
Valid Votes	60,507	72.02%	245,519	93.87%	11,598,929	93.97%
Rejected Votes	4,035	4.8%	16,020	6.13%	744,373	6.03%
Total Polled	64,532	76.82%	261,539	78.99%	12,343,302	75.89%
Registered Electors	84,019		331,109		16,263,885	

=== 2015 Sri Lankan Parliamentary Election ===
Party	Minneriya		Polonnaruwa Electoral District		Sri Lanka	
Party	Votes	%	Votes	%	Votes	%
UPFA	29,090	49.10%	103,172	43.67%	4,732,664	42.48%
UNP	25,748	43.46%	118,845	50.30%	5,098,916	45.77%
JVP	4,175	7.05%	13,497	5.71%	544,154	4.88%
Other Parties (with < 1%)	230	0.39%	765	0.32%	44,633	0.40%
Valid Votes	59,243	96.25%	236,279	96.39%	11,140,333	95.35%
Rejected Votes	2,274	3.69%	8,654	3.53%	516,926	4.42%
Total Polled	61,553	73.81%	245,116	79.81%	11,684,111	77.66%
Registered Electors	83,395		307,125		15,044,490	

=== 2010 Sri Lankan Parliamentary Election ===
Party	Minneriya		Polonnaruwa Electoral District		Sri Lanka	
Party	Votes	%	Votes	%	Votes	%
UPFA	29,597	72.60%	118,694	69.25%	4,846,388	60.38%
UNP	8,890	21.81%	45,732	26.68%	2,357,057	29.37%
DNA	2,166	5.31%	6,457	3.77%	441,251	5.50%
Other Parties (with < 1%)	113	0.28%	515	0.30%	53,515	0.67%
Valid Votes	40,766	91.76%	171,398	92.02%	8,026,322	96.03%
Rejected Votes	3,643	8.20%	14,798	7.94%	581,465	6.96%
Total Polled	44,428	57.64%	186,269	63.10%	8,358,246	59.29%
Registered Electors	77,084		295,186		14,097,690	

=== 2004 Sri Lankan Parliamentary Election ===
Party	Minneriya		Polonnaruwa Electoral District		Sri Lanka	
Party	Votes	%	Votes	%	Votes	%
UPFA	30,342	61.99%	106,243	57.36%	4,223,126	45.70%
UNP	17,522	35.80%	75,664	40.85%	3,486,792	37.73%
JHU	850	1.74%	2,413	1.30%	552,723	5.98%
Other Parties (with < 1%)	230	0.47%	890	0.48%	54,340	0.59%
Valid Votes	48,944	92.85%	185,210	93.57%	9,241,931	94.52%
Rejected Votes	3,746	7.11%	12,673	6.40%	534,452	5.47%
Total Polled	52,711	74.97%	197,934	77.91%	9,777,821	75.74%
Registered Electors	70,308		254,061		12,909,631	

=== 2001 Sri Lankan Parliamentary Election ===
Party	Minneriya		Polonnaruwa Electoral District		Sri Lanka	
Party	Votes	%	Votes	%	Votes	%
UNP	21,436	44.44%	86,786	47.82%	4,086,026	45.62%
PA	19,423	40.27%	73,679	40.60%	3,330,815	37.19%
JVP	6,749	13.99%	18,956	10.44%	815,353	9.10%
Other Parties (with < 1%)	623	1.29%	2,076	1.14%	118,404	1.32%
Valid Votes	48,231	93.43%	181,497	93.87%	8,955,844	94.77%
Rejected Votes	3,393	6.57%	11,854	6.13%	494,009	5.23%
Total Polled	51,624	77.46%	193,351	80.41%	9,449,878	76.03%
Registered Electors	66,645		240,444		12,428,762	

=== 2000 Sri Lankan Parliamentary Election ===
Party	Minneriya		Polonnaruwa Electoral District		Sri Lanka	
Party	Votes	%	Votes	%	Votes	%
UNP	22,693	47.13%	82,399	46.33%	3,451,765	40.12%
PA	21,014	43.64%	80,023	44.99%	3,899,329	45.33%
JVP	3,811	7.91%	11,161	6.27%	518,725	6.03%
Other Parties (with < 1%)	636	1.32%	4,288	2.41%	424,915	4.94%
Valid Votes	48,154	N/A	177,871	N/A	8,602,617	N/A

=== 1994 Sri Lankan Parliamentary Election ===
Party	Minneriya		Polonnaruwa Electoral District		Sri Lanka	
Party	Votes	%	Votes	%	Votes	%
PA	24,660	53.78%	82,438	51.18%	3,887,805	48.94%
UNP	20,379	44.45%	76,706	47.62%	3,498,370	44.04%
SLPF	811	1.77%	1,934	1.20%	90,078	1.13%
Valid Votes	45,850	96.31%	161,078	96.16%	7,943,688	95.20%
Rejected Votes	1,758	3.69%	6,434	3.84%	400,395	4.80%
Total Polled	47,608	82.95%	167,512	82.06%	8,344,095	74.75%
Registered Electors	57,393		204,138		11,163,064	

=== 1989 Sri Lankan Parliamentary Election ===
Party	Minneriya		Polonnaruwa Electoral District		Sri Lanka	
Party	Votes	%	Votes	%	Votes	%
UNP	10,576	54.28%	43,473	62.33%	2,838,005	50.71%
SLFP	7,431	38.14%	23,221	33.29%	1,785,369	31.90%
USA	765	3.93%	1,117	1.60%	141,983	2.54%
ELJP	711	3.65%	1,933	2.77%	67,723	1.21%
Valid Votes	19,483	91.26%	69,744	92.98%	5,596,468	93.87%
Rejected Votes	1,866	8.74%	5,266	7.02%	365,563	6.13%
Total Polled	21,349	42.96%	75,010	45.81%	5,962,031	63.60%
Registered Electors	49,700		163,745		9,374,164	

== Demographics ==
=== Ethnicity ===
The Minneriya Polling Division has a Sinhalese majority (99.0%) . In comparison, the Polonnaruwa Electoral District (which contains the Minneriya Polling Division) has a Sinhalese majority (90.7%)

Ethnicity in Minneriya
1. Sinhalese (99.0%)
2. Other (1.00%)

=== Religion ===
The Minneriya Polling Division has a Buddhist majority (97.8%) . In comparison, the Polonnaruwa Electoral District (which contains the Minneriya Polling Division) has a Buddhist majority (89.7%)

Religion in Minneriya
1. Buddhist (97.8%)
2. Other (1.20%)
3. Roman Catholic (1.10%)
