= Polonnaruwa Polling Division =

Polonnaruwa
- Polling Division
- Coordinates: 7.950131°N 81.119102°E
- Country: Sri Lanka
- Province: North Central Province, Sri Lanka
- Electoral District: Polonnaruwa Electoral District

Area
  - Total: 1,503.12 km^{2} (580.36 sq mi)

Population (2012)
  - Total: 195,857
  - Density: 130/km^{2} (340/sq mi)
- ISO 3166 code: EC-18C

The Polonnaruwa Polling Division is a Polling Division in the Polonnaruwa Electoral District, in the North Central Province, Sri Lanka.

== Presidential Election Results ==
=== Summary ===
Polonnaruws is considered a good bellweather for presidential elections because it has matched the final country result 8 out of 8 times.

Year	Polonnaruwa	Polonnaruwa Electoral District	MAE %	Sri Lanka	MAE %
2019	SLPP	SLPP	2.63%	SLPP	1.63%
2015	NDF	NDF	5.02%	NDF	11.35%
2010	UPFA	UPFA	2.73%	UPFA	4.00%
2005	UPFA	UPFA	1.96%	UPFA	0.27%
1999	PA	PA	0.23%	PA	0.32%
1994	PA	PA	0.67%	PA	3.91%
1988	UNP	UNP	2.06%	UNP	1.82%
1982	UNP	UNP	1.43%	UNP	4.64%
Matches/Mean MAE	8/8	8/8	2.09%	8/8	3.49%

=== 2019 Sri Lankan Presidential Election ===
Party	Polonnaruwa		Polonnaruwa Electoral District		Sri Lanka	
Party	Votes	%	Votes	%	Votes	%
SLPP	62,882	50.33%	147,340	53.01%	6,924,255	52.25%
NDF	54,238	43.41%	112,473	40.47%	5,564,239	41.99%
NMPP	5,045	4.04%	12,284	4.42%	418,553	3.16%
Other Parties (with < 1%)	2,785	2.23%	5,827	2.10%	345,452	2.61%
Valid Votes	124,950	98.94%	277,924	99.09%	13,252,499	98.99%
Rejected Votes	1,334	1.06%	2,563	0.91%	135,452	1.01%
Total Polled	126,284	85.10%	280,487	85.92%	13,387,951	83.71%
Registered Electors	148,401		326,443		15,992,568	

=== 2015 Sri Lankan Presidential Election ===
Party	Polonnaruwa		Polonnaruwa Electoral District		Sri Lanka	
Party	Votes	%	Votes	%	Votes	%
NDF	72,875	62.86%	147,974	57.80%	6,217,162	51.28%
UPFA	41,961	36.19%	105,640	41.27%	5,768,090	47.58%
Other Parties (with < 1%)	1,099	0.95%	2,382	0.93%	138,200	1.14%
Valid Votes	115,935	99.27%	255,996	99.31%	12,123,452	98.85%
Rejected Votes	850	0.73%	1,790	0.69%	140,925	1.15%
Total Polled	116,785	79.87%	257,786	80.22%	12,264,377	78.69%
Registered Electors	146,225		321,338		15,585,942	

=== 2010 Sri Lankan Presidential Election ===
Party	Polonnaruwa		Polonnaruwa Electoral District		Sri Lanka	
Party	Votes	%	Votes	%	Votes	%
UPFA	60,718	62.10%	144,889	64.92%	6,015,934	57.88%
NDF	35,473	36.28%	75,026	33.62%	4,173,185	40.15%
Other Parties (with < 1%)	1,577	1.61%	3,260	1.46%	204,494	1.97%
Valid Votes	97,768	99.28%	223,175	99.34%	10,393,613	99.03%
Rejected Votes	710	0.72%	1,472	0.66%	101,838	0.97%
Total Polled	98,478	75.26%	224,647	76.26%	10,495,451	66.70%
Registered Electors	130,851		294,583		15,734,587	

=== 2005 Sri Lankan Presidential Election ===
Party	Polonnaruwa		Polonnaruwa Electoral District		Sri Lanka	
Party	Votes	%	Votes	%	Votes	%
UPFA	47,188	50.64%	110,499	52.61%	4,887,152	50.29%
UNP	44,951	48.24%	97,142	46.25%	4,706,366	48.43%
Other Parties (with < 1%)	1,044	1.12%	2,389	1.14%	123,521	1.27%
Valid Votes	93,183	99.01%	210,030	99.06%	9,717,039	98.88%
Rejected Votes	936	0.99%	2,002	0.94%	109,869	1.12%
Total Polled	94,119	77.18%	212,032	78.07%	9,826,908	69.51%
Registered Electors	121,949		271,609		14,136,979	

=== 1999 Sri Lankan Presidential Election ===
Party	Polonnaruwa		Polonnaruwa Electoral District		Sri Lanka	
Party	Votes	%	Votes	%	Votes	%
PA	39,372	51.64%	88,663	51.55%	4,312,157	51.12%
UNP	32,472	42.59%	72,598	42.21%	3,602,748	42.71%
JVP	3,165	4.15%	8,020	4.66%	343,927	4.08%
Other Parties (with < 1%)	1,240	1.63%	2,726	1.58%	176,679	2.09%
Valid Votes	76,249	98.10%	172,007	98.20%	8,435,754	97.69%
Rejected Votes	1,473	1.90%	3,151	1.80%	199,536	2.31%
Total Polled	77,722	78.56%	175,158	78.11%	8,635,290	72.17%
Registered Electors	98,929		224,239		11,965,536	

=== 1994 Sri Lankan Presidential Election ===
Party	Polonnaruwa		Polonnaruwa Electoral District		Sri Lanka	
Party	Votes	%	Votes	%	Votes	%
PA	36,865	58.39%	88,907	59.08%	4,709,205	62.28%
UNP	25,284	40.05%	59,287	39.40%	2,715,283	35.91%
Other Parties (with < 1%)	987	1.56%	2,281	1.52%	137,040	1.81%
Valid Votes	63,136	97.35%	150,475	97.43%	7,561,526	98.03%
Rejected Votes	1,716	2.65%	3,966	2.57%	151,706	1.97%
Total Polled	64,852	74.09%	154,441	75.73%	7,713,232	69.12%
Registered Electors	87,535		203,940		11,158,880	

=== 1988 Sri Lankan Presidential Election ===
Party	Polonnaruwa		Polonnaruwa Electoral District		Sri Lanka	
Party	Votes	%	Votes	%	Votes	%
UNP	17,179	53.43%	26,392	55.54%	2,569,199	50.43%
SLFP	14,320	44.54%	20,173	42.45%	2,289,857	44.95%
SLMP	651	2.02%	957	2.01%	235,701	4.63%
Valid Votes	32,150	98.07%	47,522	97.62%	5,094,754	98.24%
Rejected Votes	634	1.93%	1,157	2.38%	91,499	1.76%
Total Polled	32,784	50.53%	48,679	29.64%	5,186,256	55.87%
Registered Electors	64,885		164,213		9,283,143	

=== 1982 Sri Lankan Presidential Election ===
Party	Polonnaruwa		Polonnaruwa Electoral District		Sri Lanka	
Party	Votes	%	Votes	%	Votes	%
UNP	20,616	58.21%	59,414	56.26%	3,450,815	52.93%
SLFP	12,286	34.69%	37,243	35.26%	2,546,348	39.05%
JVP	2,161	6.10%	8,138	7.71%	273,428	4.19%
Other Parties (with < 1%)	353	1.00%	820	0.78%	249,460	3.83%
Valid Votes	35,416	98.81%	105,615	99.00%	6,520,156	98.78%
Rejected Votes	426	1.19%	1,064	1.00%	80,470	1.22%
Total Polled	35,842	81.36%	106,679	82.81%	6,600,626	80.15%
Registered Electors	44,055		128,822		8,235,358	

== Parliamentary Election Results ==
=== Summary ===
The winner of Polonnaruwa has matched the final country result 6 out of 7 times. Hence, Polonnaruwa is a healthy Bellwether for Parliamentary Elections.

Year	Polonnaruwa	Polonnaruwa Electoral District	MAE %	Sri Lanka	MAE %
2020	SLPFA	SLPFA		SLPFA	
2015	UNP	UNP	2.46%	UNP	3.86%
2010	UPFA	UPFA	1.20%	UPFA	5.14%
2004	UPFA	UPFA	1.87%	UPFA	6.64%
2001	UNP	UNP	0.81%	UNP	2.89%
2000	UNP	UNP	0.49%	PA	2.38%
1994	PA	PA	1.15%	PA	2.65%
1989	UNP	UNP	1.21%	UNP	6.96%
Matches/Mean MAE	6/7	6/7	1.31%	7/7	4.36%

=== 2020 Sri Lankan Parliamentary Election ===
Party	Polonnaruwa		Polonnaruwa Electoral District		Sri Lanka	
Party	Votes	%	Votes	%	Votes	%
SLPFA	79,724	72.65%	180,847	73.66%	6,853,693	59.09%
SJB	22,989	20.95%	47,281	19.46%	2,771,984	23.09%
UNP	2,826	2.58%	6,525	2.66%	249,435	2.15%
JJB	2,416	2.2%	6,792	2.77%	445,958	3.84%
Other Parties (with < 1%)	1,380	1.62%	3,574	1.45%	1,227,859	11.02%
Valid Votes	109,735	73.42%	245,519	93.87%	11,598,929	93.97%
Rejected Votes	7,603	5.09%	16,020	6.13%	744,373	6.03%
Total Polled	117,338	78.5%	261,539	78.99%	12,343,302	75.89%
Registered Electors	149,466		331,109		16,263,885	

=== 2015 Sri Lankan Parliamentary Election ===
Party	Polonnaruwa		Polonnaruwa Electoral District		Sri Lanka	
Party	Votes	%	Votes	%	Votes	%
UNP	56,387	53.14%	118,845	50.30%	5,098,916	45.77%
UPFA	43,900	41.37%	103,172	43.67%	4,732,664	42.48%
JVP	5,502	5.19%	13,497	5.71%	544,154	4.88%
Other Parties (with < 1%)	320	0.30%	765	0.32%	44,633	0.40%
Valid Votes	106,109	96.26%	236,279	96.39%	11,140,333	95.35%
Rejected Votes	4,017	3.64%	8,654	3.53%	516,926	4.42%
Total Polled	110,227	75.38%	245,116	79.81%	11,684,111	77.66%
Registered Electors	146,225		307,125		15,044,490	

=== 2010 Sri Lankan Parliamentary Election ===
Party	Polonnaruwa		Polonnaruwa Electoral District		Sri Lanka	
Party	Votes	%	Votes	%	Votes	%
UPFA	51,998	68.17%	118,694	69.25%	4,846,388	60.38%
UNP	21,579	28.29%	45,732	26.68%	2,357,057	29.37%
DNA	2,453	3.22%	6,457	3.77%	441,251	5.50%
Other Parties (with < 1%)	250	0.33%	515	0.30%	53,515	0.67%
Valid Votes	76,280	91.78%	171,398	92.02%	8,026,322	96.03%
Rejected Votes	6,804	8.19%	14,798	7.94%	581,465	6.96%
Total Polled	83,116	63.52%	186,269	63.10%	8,358,246	59.29%
Registered Electors	130,851		295,186		14,097,690	

=== 2004 Sri Lankan Parliamentary Election ===
Party	Polonnaruwa		Polonnaruwa Electoral District		Sri Lanka	
Party	Votes	%	Votes	%	Votes	%
UPFA	45,936	55.45%	106,243	57.36%	4,223,126	45.70%
UNP	35,420	42.76%	75,664	40.85%	3,486,792	37.73%
JHU	1,067	1.29%	2,413	1.30%	552,723	5.98%
Other Parties (with < 1%)	413	0.50%	890	0.48%	54,340	0.59%
Valid Votes	82,836	93.57%	185,210	93.57%	9,241,931	94.52%
Rejected Votes	5,683	6.42%	12,673	6.40%	534,452	5.47%
Total Polled	88,533	75.57%	197,934	77.91%	9,777,821	75.74%
Registered Electors	117,148		254,061		12,909,631	

=== 2001 Sri Lankan Parliamentary Election ===
Party	Polonnaruwa		Polonnaruwa Electoral District		Sri Lanka	
Party	Votes	%	Votes	%	Votes	%
UNP	39,349	48.53%	86,786	47.82%	4,086,026	45.62%
PA	33,531	41.36%	73,679	40.60%	3,330,815	37.19%
JVP	7,280	8.98%	18,956	10.44%	815,353	9.10%
Other Parties (with < 1%)	916	1.13%	2,076	1.14%	118,404	1.32%
Valid Votes	81,076	93.11%	181,497	93.87%	8,955,844	94.77%
Rejected Votes	5,995	6.89%	11,854	6.13%	494,009	5.23%
Total Polled	87,071	78.95%	193,351	80.41%	9,449,878	76.03%
Registered Electors	110,281		240,444		12,428,762	

=== 2000 Sri Lankan Parliamentary Election ===
Party	Polonnaruwa		Polonnaruwa Electoral District		Sri Lanka	
Party	Votes	%	Votes	%	Votes	%
UNP	35,197	45.77%	82,399	46.33%	3,451,765	40.12%
PA	34,979	45.48%	80,023	44.99%	3,899,329	45.33%
JVP	4,691	6.10%	11,161	6.27%	518,725	6.03%
Other Parties (with < 1%)	1,152	1.50%	2,311	1.30%	239,322	2.78%
NUA	886	1.15%	1,977	1.11%	185,593	2.16%
Valid Votes	76,905	N/A	177,871	N/A	8,602,617	N/A

=== 1994 Sri Lankan Parliamentary Election ===
Party	Polonnaruwa		Polonnaruwa Electoral District		Sri Lanka	
Party	Votes	%	Votes	%	Votes	%
PA	33,381	50.05%	82,438	51.18%	3,887,805	48.94%
UNP	32,562	48.82%	76,706	47.62%	3,498,370	44.04%
SLPF	750	1.12%	1,934	1.20%	90,078	1.13%
Valid Votes	66,693	95.72%	161,078	96.16%	7,943,688	95.20%
Rejected Votes	2,984	4.28%	6,434	3.84%	400,395	4.80%
Total Polled	69,677	79.60%	167,512	82.06%	8,344,095	74.75%
Registered Electors	87,535		204,138		11,163,064	

=== 1989 Sri Lankan Parliamentary Election ===
Party	Polonnaruwa		Polonnaruwa Electoral District		Sri Lanka	
Party	Votes	%	Votes	%	Votes	%
UNP	23,469	63.87%	43,473	62.33%	2,838,005	50.71%
SLFP	11,973	32.58%	23,221	33.29%	1,785,369	31.90%
ELJP	1,052	2.86%	1,933	2.77%	67,723	1.21%
Other Parties (with < 1%)	250	0.68%	1,117	1.60%	141,983	2.54%
Valid Votes	36,744	93.93%	69,744	92.98%	5,596,468	93.87%
Rejected Votes	2,376	6.07%	5,266	7.02%	365,563	6.13%
Total Polled	39,120	60.97%	75,010	45.81%	5,962,031	63.60%
Registered Electors	64,163		163,745		9,374,164	

== Demographics ==
=== Ethnicity ===
The Polonnaruwa Polling Division has a Sinhalese majority (87.1%) . In comparison, the Polonnaruwa Electoral District (which contains the Polonnaruwa Polling Division) has a Sinhalese majority (90.7%)

Ethnicity in Polonnaruwa
1. Sinhalese (87.1%)
2. Moor (9.20%)
3. Sri Lankan Tamil (3.50%)
4. Other (0.20%)

=== Religion ===
The Polonnaruwa Polling Division has a Buddhist majority (86.0%) . In comparison, the Polonnaruwa Electoral District (which contains the Polonnaruwa Polling Division) has a Buddhist majority (89.7%)

Religion in Polonnaruwa
1. Buddhist (86.0%)
2. Muslim (9.30%)
3. Hindu (3.40%)
4. Other (1.30%)
