= Earl Gunasekara =

Sri Lankan politician

Hon. Earl Gunasekara MP

Deputy Minister of Plantation Industries
- In office 2010 – 12 January 2015

Member of Parliament for Polonnaruwa District
- In office 2000 – 26 June 2015

Personal details
- Born: July 12, 1960 (age 66)
- Party: Samagi Jana Balawegaya; United People's Freedom Alliance
- Education: Kingswood College, Kandy
- Occupation: Businessman

Earl Gunasekara is a Sri Lankan politician, a member of the Parliament of Sri Lanka and the Deputy Minister of Plantation Industries. He was a Member of Parliament elected from the District of Polonnaruwa representing the United National Party. He is owner of the Earl's Court Group of Sri Lanka.

== See also ==
- Political system of Sri Lanka
