= S. K. Subasinghe =

Sri Lankan politician

Hon. S. K. Subasinghe MP

Member of Parliament for National List
- In office 2001–2004

Member of Parliament for Polonnaruwa District
- In office 2004–2010

Personal details
- Party: Janatha Vimukthi Peramuna

S. K. Subasinghe is a Sri Lankan politician and a former member of the Parliament of Sri Lanka.
