= Vikramabahu Karunaratne =

Sri Lankan politician (1943–2024)

- වික්‍රමබාහු කරුණාරත්න விக்கிரமபாகு கருணாரத்தின
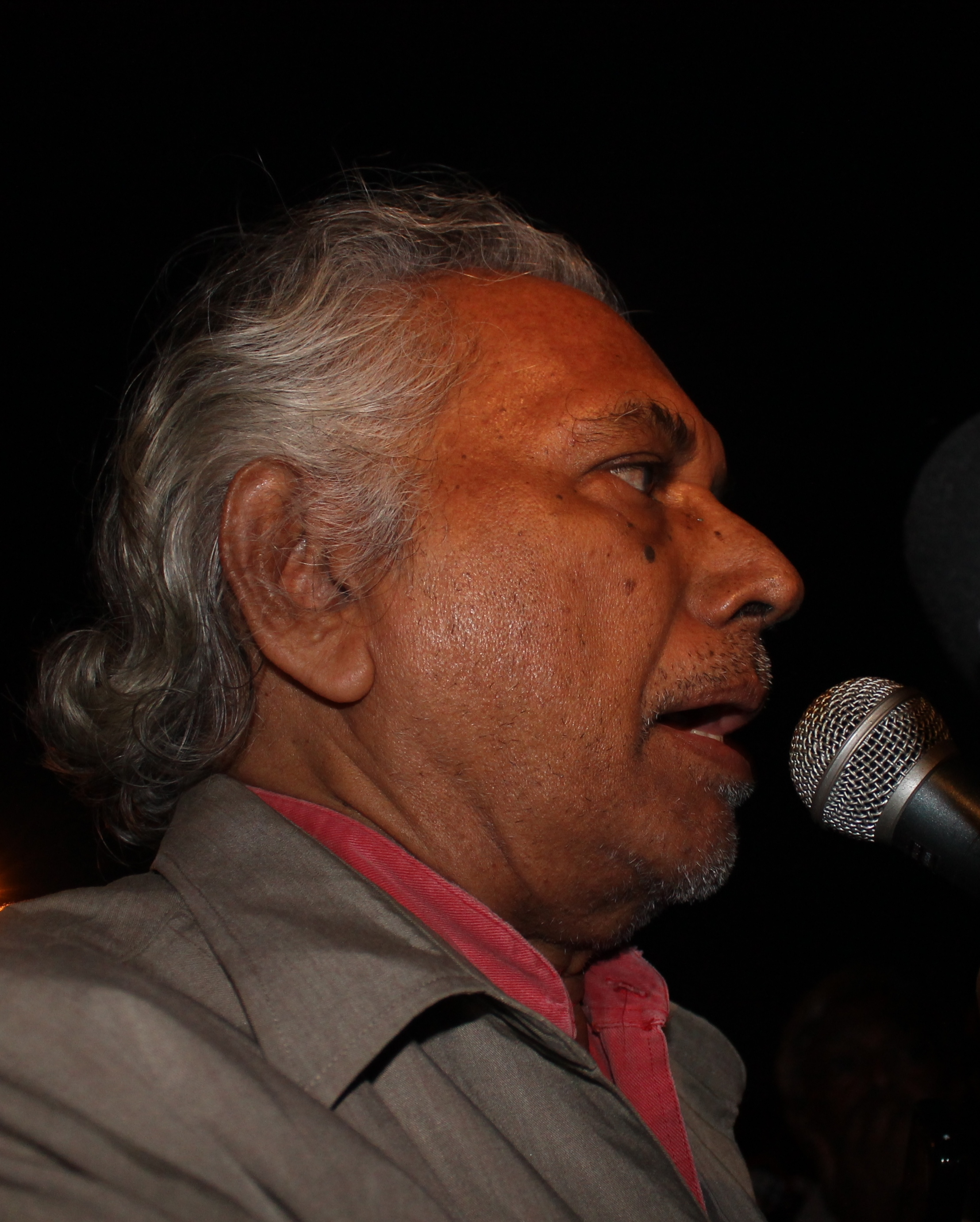
- Karunaratne in 2014

Personal details
- Born: 8 March 1943 Lunugala, Badulla District, British Ceylon
- Died: 25 July 2024 (aged 81) Colombo, Sri Lanka
- Party: Left Front
- Other political affiliations: Nava Sama Samaja Party (1977–2024); Lanka Sama Samaja Party (1962–1972)
- Relations: Mudiyanse Karunarathne (father); Vimala Kothalawale (mother)
- Education: Ananda College; University of Ceylon; University of Cambridge
- Occupation: Academic

Vikramabahu Karunaratne (Sinhala: වික්‍රමබාහු කරුණාරත්න, romanized: Vikramabāhu Karuṇāratna; Tamil: விக்கிரமபாகு கருணாரத்தின, romanized: Vikkiramapāku Karuṇārattiṉa; 8 March 1943 – 25 July 2024) was a Sri Lankan scientist and politician. He was a candidate in the 2010 Sri Lankan presidential election.

== Early life and education ==
Karunaratne was born on 8 March 1943 in Lunugala in present-day southeast Sri Lanka. Both his parents were teachers. He received his primary education at Ananda Sastralaya, Matugama before transferring to Ananda College, Colombo for his secondary education. Thereafter he attended the University of Ceylon from where he graduated with first-class honours in electrical engineering. He received a Commonwealth scholarship to study at the University of Cambridge, from which he received a doctorate in 1970. He returned to Sri Lanka and started an academic career.

== Political career ==
Karunaratne became politically active very early in his life, joining the Lanka Sama Samaja Party (LSSP) in 1962 whilst an undergraduate at the University of Ceylon. He was elected to the LSSP's Central Committee in 1972 but fell out with the party's leadership over their support for the Sri Lanka Freedom Party and the 1972 Republican Constitution. He was expelled from the LSSP.

In 1977 Karunaratne joined with other former members of the LSSP, including Vasudeva Nanayakkara, to form the Nava Sama Samaja Party, a breakaway party of the LSSP.

In 1978, he was arrested in Kandy for attempting to put up protest slogans against then-incumbent President J. R. Jayewardene prior to his visit to Kandy. He was released without charge after a few months of detention, and the University of Peradeniya which suspended him from service soon after his arrest reinstated him after a rather delayed inquiry. He was forced to leave the University after he collected his back pay. He was reinstated by Cabinet decision in 2001 but was not allowed by the university. The human rights commission intervened and the then-incumbent government paid his back wages and restored his status.

The Sri Lankan government proscribed the NSSP, Janatha Vimukthi Peramuna (JVP) and Communist Party of Sri Lanka (CP) after the Black July anti-Tamil riots of 1983. Karunaratne, Vasudeva Nanayakkara, Rohana Wijeweera and other left-wing politicians went into hiding until 1985 when the proscription was lifted.

In 1987, the NSSP joined with the LSSP, CP and Sri Lanka Mahajana Pakshaya (SLMP) to form the United Socialist Alliance. Karunaratne was injured on 2 December 1988 when a JVP gang attacked an election rally at Kadawatte near Colombo in support of SLMP presidential candidate Ossie Abeygunasekera. The JVP attacked numerous left-wing politicians and their supporters during its second insurrection.

In 1998 the NSSP joined with the National Democratic Movement, New Democratic Party and United Socialist Party (a breakaway faction of the NSSP) to form the New Left Front (NLF). The USP has since left the NLF but the Democratic Left Front (another breakaway faction of the NSSP formed by Vasudeva Nanayakkara) has joined the NLF. Since 2004 the NLF has restyled itself as Left Front.

=== 2010 presidential campaign ===
On 26 November 2009, it was announced that Karunaratne would be the Left Front's candidate for the 2010 Sri Lankan presidential elections. Karunaratne received only 7,055 votes, or 0.07% of all votes cast.

== Death ==
Karunaratne died on 25 July 2024, at the age of 81 while receiving treatment at Colombo National Hospital. He had been seriously ill for some time at the time of his death.
