= Siripala Gamalath =

Sri Lankan politician (born 1952)

Hon. Siripala Gamalath
- සිරිපාල ගමලත් சிறிபால கமலத்

Deputy Minister of Agricultural Marketing Development

Deputy Minister of Agrarian Services
- In office 2007–2010

Deputy Minister of Lands & Land Development
- In office 2010 – 12 January 2015

Member of Parliament for Polonnaruwa District
- Incumbent
- Assumed office 2004

Personal details
- Born: July 18, 1952 (age 73)
- Party: Sri Lanka Freedom Party
- Other political affiliations: United People's Freedom Alliance

Siripala Gamalath (born July 18, 1952) is a Sri Lankan politician and a member of the Parliament of Sri Lanka. He is a member of the United People's Freedom Alliance party and of Buddhist religion.
