= C. A. Suriyaarachchi =

Sri Lankan politician

Hon. C. A. Suriyaarachchi MP

Deputy Minister of Land & Land Development
- In office 2007–2010

Deputy Minister of Social Services
- In office 2010 – 12 January 2015

Member of Parliament for Polonnaruwa District
- In office 2004 – 26 June 2015
- In office 1989–1994

Personal details
- Born: 20 November 1953 (age 72)
- Party: Sri Lanka Freedom Party; United National Party (Democratic); United National Party
- Other political affiliations: United People's Freedom Alliance; United National Front

Chandrasiri Ariyawansa Suriyaarachchi is a Sri Lankan politician, a member of the Parliament of Sri Lanka and a government minister.
