= Nava Sama Samaja Party =

New Equal Society Party නව සම සමාජ පක්ෂය நவ சமசமாஜக் கட்சி
- Secretary: Vikramabahu Karunaratne
- Founder: Vikramabahu Karunaratne
- Founded: 1977
- Split from: Lanka Sama Samaja Party
- Headquarters: 17 Barracks Lane, Colombo 02
- Ideology: Communism; Trotskyism
- Political position: Far-left
- National affiliation: Left Liberation Front
- International affiliation: Fourth International (Formerly)
- Colors: Red Yellow

Election symbol
- Table

Website
- www.nssp.info/%20nssp.info

The Nava Sama Samaja Pakshaya (English: New Equal Society Party) is a Trotskyist political party in Sri Lanka. It was formed through the expulsion from the Lanka Sama Samaja Party (LSSP) of the Vama Samsamja tendency led by Dr Vickrambahu (Bahu), Sumanasiri Liyanage and some others. Siritunga Jayasuriya (Siri) and Vasudeva Nanayakkara (Vasu) joined later. In 1976 when the LSSP was thrown out of the coalition large numbers joined the tendency and in December 1977 it declared itself as Nava Sama Samaja Party.

Initially the NSSP was affiliated with the Committee for a Workers' International but, in the opinion of the CWI, never fully agreed with the analysis that it had made of Stalinism, of developments in the former colonial and semi-colonial world and the national question. It departed with CWI in 1988, in a process described by some as expulsion, but by the CWI as a split. The remaining CWI members formed the United Socialist Party. Since 1991 the NSSP, led by Vikramabahu Karunaratne, has been the Sri Lankan section of the Fourth International alongside other Samasamaj parties. United Socialist Party also embraces the ideology of Trotsky.

In October 2020 Executive Bureau of the Fourth International released a statement condemning the NSSP for allying with the United National Party (UNP) in 2020 Sri Lankan parliamentary election. Vikramabahu Karunaratne contested the elections under UNP and refused to answer repeated questions by the Fourth International and the NSSP members supported Vikramabahu's decision. Thus the Bureau of the Fourth International decided to suspend all links with the NSSP.
