= Left Liberation Front =

Leftist alliance in Sri Lanka

- Leader: Vikramabahu Karunaratne
- Secretary: Leenus Jayatilake
- Founded: 1998
- Preceded by: New Left Front
- Headquarters: 17 Barracks Lane, Colombo 02
- Ideology: Communism; Trotskyism
- Colors: Red

Election symbol
- Umbrella

Website
- nssp.info

The Left Liberation Front is a far-left electoral coalition in Sri Lanka. It was founded in 1998 as the New Left Front by the Nava Sama Samaja Party, former members of the People's Alliance, and the Janatha Vimukthi Peramuna (JVP). JVP became a part of the mainstream entering parliament in 1994. One of its early leaders is Anura Kumara Dissanayake.

The alliance has changed its name twice from the New Left Front: firstly to Left Front and secondly to Left Liberation Front in early 2010.

== Members ==
Its current members are:

- Democratic Left Front
- National Democratic Movement
- Nava Sama Samaja Party
- New Democratic Party

== Elections ==
In the 2005 Sri Lankan presidential election, the New Left Front's candidate Chamil Jayaneththi came sixth of thirteen, with 9,296 votes.

== See also ==
- Communist parties in Sri Lanka
- Trotskyist organisations in Sri Lanka
