= Motherland People's Party =

Motherland People's Party මව්බිම ජනතා පක්‍ෂය மௌவ்பிம ஜனதா பக்ஷய
- Secretary: Udayalal Rajapaksa
- Founder: Harischandra Wijayatunga
- Founded: 1990
- Preceded by: Sinhalaye Mahasammatha Bhoomiputhra Pakshaya
- Headquarters: 156/6 Makola Road, Kiribathgoda, Kelaniya
- Ideology: Mahasammatavada; Sinhalese Buddhist nationalism; Social democracy
- Religion: Theravada Buddhism

Election symbol
- Aeroplane

The Motherland People's Party, formerly known as the Sinhalaye Mahasammata Bumiputra Paksaya (The Great Consensus Party of the Sons of the Soil of Sinhala) is a minor Sinhalese Buddhist political party in Sri Lanka founded by Dr. Harischandra Wijayatunga. Wijayatunga was the party's candidate for president in 1994 and 1999.
