= Aluwihare (surname) =

Aluwihare (Sinhala: අලුවිහාරේ, romanized: Aluvihārē) is a Sinhalese surname. Notable people with the surname include:

- Alick Aluwihare (1926–2009), Sri Lankan politician
- Bernard Aluwihare (1902–1961), Ceylonese politician
- Buwaneka Aluwihare, Sri Lankan puisne justice of the Supreme Court (2013–2024)
- Ranjith Aluwihare (born 1958), Sri Lankan politician
- Richard Aluwihare (1895–1976), Sri Lankan civil servant, diplomat and the first Ceylonese Inspector General of Police
- Wasantha Aluwihare (born 1962), Sri Lankan politician

== See also ==
- Aluwihare, a village in Matale District of Sri Lanka
- Aluvihare Rock Temple, a Buddhist temple in Sri Lanka
