= List of chief ministers of Central Province =

Chief Minister of Central Province
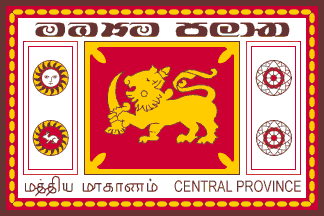
- Flag of Central Province, Sri Lanka
- Incumbent; Vacant since 26 April 2019
- Board of Ministers of the Central Province
- Style: The Honourable
- Member of: Central Provincial Council
- Appointer: Monty Gopallawa
- Inaugural holder: W. M. P. B. Dissanayake
- Formation: 3 February 1988
- Website: Central Provincial Council

The chief minister of Central Province, Sri Lanka, is the head of the provincial board of ministers, a body which aids and advises the governor, the head of the provincial government, in the exercise of his executive power. The governor appoints as chief minister the member of the Central Provincial Council who, in his opinion, commands the support of a majority of that council.

== Chief ministers ==
Sri Lanka Freedom Party United National Party

No.	Name	Portrait	Party	Took office	Left office	Refs
1	W. M. P. B. Dissanayake		United National Party	9 June 1988	June 1998	
	Vacant			June 1998	April 1999	
2	Sarath Ekanayake		Sri Lanka Freedom Party	April 1999	June 1999	
3	Nandimithra Ekanayake		Sri Lanka Freedom Party	June 1999	6 November 2000	
4(2)	Sarath Ekanayake		Sri Lanka Freedom Party	6 November 2000	30 April 2002	
5(1)	W. M. P. B. Dissanayake		United National Party	30 April 2002	29 May 2003	
6	Wasantha Aluvihare		United National Party	5 June 2003	18 July 2004	
7(2)	Sarath Ekanayake		Sri Lanka Freedom Party	18 July 2004	25 April 2018	
	Vacant			26 April 2019		
