= Wasantha =

Wasantha may refer to:

- Wasantha Aluwihare (born 1962), Sri Lankan politician
- Wasantha Karannagoda, Sri Lankan navy officer
- Wasantha Senanayake (born 1973), Sri Lankan politician
- L. G. Wasantha Piyatissa, Sri Lankan politician
- Lakshman Wasantha Perera (born 1963), Sri Lankan politician
- Wasantha Obesekere, Sri Lankan film director
