= Sarath Ekanayake =

Sri Lankan politician

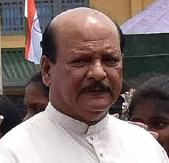
- Ekanayake in May 2017

2nd, 4th & 7th Chief Minister of Central Province
- Incumbent
- Assumed office 18 June 2004
- Preceded by: Wasantha Aluvihare
- In office 6 November 2000 – 30 April 2002
- Preceded by: Nandimithra Ekanayake
- Succeeded by: W. M. P. B. Dissanayake
- In office April 1999 – June 1999
- Preceded by: Vacant
- Succeeded by: Nandimithra Ekanayake

Personal details
- Born: Sri Lanka
- Party: Sri Lanka Freedom Party

Sarath Ekanayake is the former Chief Minister of the Central Province of Sri Lanka. He previously served as the 2nd, 4th and 7th Chief Minister of Central Province between April and June 1999, November 2000 and April 2002 and 2004 till 2015. He was also the Governor of the North central Province. He belongs to the Sri Lanka Freedom Party and is part of the United People's Freedom Alliance. He is also the president of the Sri Lanka Basketball Federation.
