= Matale Electoral District =

Electoral district in Sri Lanka

Matale
- Electoral District for the Parliament of Sri Lanka
- Administrative District: Matale
- Province: Central
- Polling divisions: 4
- Population: 483,000 (2008)
- Electorate: 342,684 (2010)
- Area: 1,993 km^{2} (770 sq mi)

Current Electoral District
- Number of members: 5
- MPs: NPP (4) Gamagedara Dissanayake; Sunil Biyanvila; Deepthi Wasalage; Dinesh Hemantha Perera SJB (1) Rohini Kawirathna

Matale electoral district is one of the 22 multi-member electoral districts of Sri Lanka created by the 1978 Constitution of Sri Lanka. The district is conterminous with the administrative district of Matale in the Central province. The district currently elects five of the 225 members of the Sri Lankan Parliament and had 342,684 registered electors in 2010. It is Sri Lanka's Electorate Number 05.

== Polling Divisions ==
The Matale Electoral District consists of the following polling divisions:

A: Dambulla

B: Laggala

C: Matale

D: Rattota

== Presidential Elections ==
=== 1982 presidential election ===
Results of the 1st presidential election held on 20 October 1982 for the district:

Candidate	Party	Votes per Polling Division				Postal Votes	Total Votes	%
Candidate	Party	Dambulla	Laggala	Matale	Rattota	Postal Votes	Total Votes	%
J. R. Jayewardene	UNP	27,368	17,354	22,452	25,183	1,674	94,031	58.11%
Hector Kobbekaduwa	SLFP	21,748	12,149	11,632	12,982	788	59,299	36.65%
Rohana Wijeweera	JVP	2,501	1,158	1,400	2,033	77	7,169	4.43%
Colvin R. de Silva	LSSP	309	155	153	239	10	866	0.54%
Kumar Ponnambalam	ACTC	46	39	85	82	1	253	0.16%
Vasudeva Nanayakkara	NSSP	40	34	49	61	12	196	0.12%
Valid Votes		52,012	30,889	35,771	40,580	2,562	161,814	100.00%
Rejected Votes		385	272	332	396	29	1,414	
Total Polled		52,397	31,161	36,103	40,976	2,591	163,228	
Registered Electors		60,536	35,129	43,705	47,906		187,276	
Turnout		86.56%	88.70%	82.61%	85.53%		87.16%	

=== 1988 presidential election ===
Results of the 2nd presidential election held on 19 December 1988 for the district:

Candidate	Party	Votes per Polling Division				Postal Votes	Total Votes	%
Candidate	Party	Dambulla	Laggala	Matale	Rattota	Postal Votes	Total Votes	%
Ranasinghe Premadasa	UNP	4,276	9,055	12,544	10,599	533	37,007	57.85%
Sirimavo Bandaranaike	SLFP	3,195	8,908	6,889	6,380	453	25,825	40.37%
Ossie Abeygunasekera	SLMP	137	216	437	320	25	1,135	1.77%
Valid Votes		7,608	18,179	19,870	17,299	1,011	63,967	100.00%
Rejected Votes		102	198	463	297	50	1,110	
Total Polled		7,710	18,377	20,333	17,596	1,061	65,077	
Registered Electors		72,515	41,110	48,841	52,472		214,938	
Turnout		10.63%	44.70%	41.63%	33.53%		30.28%	

=== 1994 presidential election ===
Results of the 3rd presidential election held on 9 November 1994 for the district:

Candidate	Party	Votes per Polling Division				Postal Votes	Total Votes	%
Candidate	Party	Dambulla	Laggala	Matale	Rattota	Postal Votes	Total Votes	%
Chandrika Kumaratunga	PA	37,869	26,092	25,234	28,300	3,954	121,449	60.98%
Srima Dissanayake	UNP	23,746	13,013	16,006	18,187	2,372	73,324	36.82%
Hudson Samarasinghe	Ind 2	602	507	379	618	5	2,111	1.06%
Harischandra Wijayatunga	SMBP	273	137	288	250	44	992	0.50%
Nihal Galappaththi	SLPF	229	143	137	154	17	680	0.34%
A. J. Ranasinghe	Ind 1	187	119	126	169	7	608	0.31%
Valid Votes		62,906	40,011	42,170	47,678	6,399	199,164	100.00%
Rejected Votes		1,458	897	1,253	1,636	73	5,317	
Total Polled		64,364	40,908	43,423	49,314	6,472	204,481	
Registered Electors		85,870	48,525	58,638	66,238		259,271	
Turnout		74.96%	84.30%	74.05%	74.45%		78.87%	

=== 1999 presidential election ===
Results of the 4th presidential election held on 21 December 1999 for the district:

Candidate	Party	Votes per Polling Division				Postal Votes	Total Votes	%
Candidate	Party	Dambulla	Laggala	Matale	Rattota	Postal Votes	Total Votes	%
Chandrika Kumaratunga	PA	35,811	24,073	21,709	26,959	2,680	111,232	51.42%
Ranil Wickramasinghe	UNP	30,850	16,091	20,185	22,336	2,482	91,944	42.51%
Nandana Gunathilake	JVP	3,496	1,069	1,392	1,574	393	7,924	3.66%
W. V. M. Ranjith	Ind 2	323	200	168	255	5	951	0.44%
Harischandra Wijayatunga	SMBP	233	112	239	264	54	902	0.42%
Rajiva Wijesinha	LPSL	270	181	172	235	2	860	0.40%
Tennyson Edirisuriya	Ind 1	214	171	122	232	8	747	0.35%
Abdul Rasool	SLMP	169	64	170	142	5	550	0.25%
Kamal Karunadasa	PLSF	132	74	56	78	3	343	0.16%
Vasudeva Nanayakkara	LDA	91	35	94	75	13	308	0.14%
Hudson Samarasinghe	Ind 3	76	48	59	78	0	261	0.12%
A. W. Premawardhana	PFF	57	30	33	27	2	149	0.07%
Ariyawansha Dissanayaka	DUNF	46	31	34	28	0	139	0.06%
Valid Votes		71,768	42,179	44,433	52,283	5,647	216,310	100.00%
Rejected Votes		1,876	1,112	1,322	1,627	234	6,171	
Total Polled		73,644	43,291	45,755	53,910	5,881	222,481	
Registered Electors		97,348	53,732	64,069	71,025		286,174	
Turnout		75.65%	80.57%	71.42%	75.90%		77.74%	

=== 2005 presidential election ===
Results of the 5th presidential election held on 17 November 2005 for the district:

Candidate	Party	Votes per Polling Division				Postal Votes	Total Votes	%
Candidate	Party	Dambulla	Laggala	Matale	Rattota	Postal Votes	Total Votes	%
Ranil Wickramasinghe	UNP	38,692	22,249	29,637	31,449	3,910	125,937	50.25%
Mahinda Rajapaksa	UPFA	43,853	23,637	20,945	25,551	6,547	120,533	48.09%
A. A. Suraweera	NDF	361	279	235	334	8	1,217	0.49%
Siritunga Jayasuriya	USP	325	243	278	362	4	1,212	0.48%
Chamil Jayaneththi	NLF	117	86	73	78	2	356	0.14%
Victor Hettigoda	ULPP	102	37	88	96	19	342	0.14%
Wimal Geeganage	SLNF	71	65	34	58	0	228	0.09%
Aruna de Soyza	RPP	84	51	33	55	1	224	0.09%
Anura De Silva	ULF	61	45	48	53	1	208	0.08%
A. K. J. Arachchige	DUA	41	35	25	39	1	141	0.06%
Wije Dias	SEP	31	28	17	19	0	95	0.04%
P. Nelson Perera	SLPF	23	14	15	24	0	76	0.03%
H. S. Dharmadwaja	UNAF	17	12	11	11	0	51	0.02%
Valid Votes		83,778	46,781	51,439	58,129	10,493	250,620	100.00%
Rejected Votes		1,073	679	932	955	146	3,785	
Total Polled		84,851	47,460	52,371	59,084	10,639	254,405	
Registered Electors		111,401	60,990	71,171	78,314		321,876	
Turnout		76.17%	77.82%	73.58%	75.45%		79.04%	

=== 2010 presidential election ===
Results of the 6th presidential election held on 26 January 2010 for the district:

Candidate	Party	Votes per Polling Division				Postal Votes	Total Votes	%
Candidate	Party	Dambulla	Laggala	Matale	Rattota	Postal Votes	Total Votes	%
Mahinda Rajapaksa	UPFA	58,016	31,277	26,996	32,818	8,846	157,953	59.74%
Sarath Fonseka	NDF	28,171	16,300	26,013	25,991	4,038	100,513	38.01%
M. C. M. Ismail	DUNF	360	213	289	232	11	1,105	0.42%
A. A. Suraweera	NDF	267	188	174	210	2	841	0.32%
W. V. M. Ranjith	Ind 1	250	136	100	139	10	635	0.24%
C. J. Sugathsiri Gamage	UDF	158	100	159	203	3	623	0.24%
A. S. P. Liyanage	SLLP	96	90	83	97	6	372	0.14%
Ukkubanda Wijekoon	Ind 3	107	70	75	87	1	340	0.13%
Siritunga Jayasuriya	USP	85	59	57	97	2	300	0.11%
Sarath Manamendra	NSH	75	72	61	88	3	299	0.11%
Lal Perera	ONF	51	46	60	91	1	249	0.09%
M. K. Shivajilingam	Ind 5	41	44	48	57	2	192	0.07%
Aithurus M. Illias	Ind 2	62	32	39	40	1	174	0.07%
Vikramabahu Karunaratne	LF	43	31	34	43	6	157	0.06%
Sanath Pinnaduwa	NA	27	28	29	32	1	117	0.04%
Wije Dias	SEP	29	21	25	27	1	103	0.04%
M. Mohamed Musthaffa	Ind 4	23	20	25	24	0	92	0.03%
Ven.Battaramulla; Seelarathana Thero	JP	27	20	17	25	0	89	0.03%
Aruna de Soyza	RPP	20	15	16	34	1	86	0.03%
Senaratna de Silva	PNF	20	15	23	16	0	74	0.03%
M. B. Thaminimulla	ACAKO	10	15	16	15	1	57	0.02%
Sarath Kongahage	UNAF	11	6	8	22	1	48	0.02%
Valid Votes		87,949	48,798	54,347	60,388	12,937	264,419	100.00%
Rejected Votes		778	361	650	760	117	2,666	
Total Polled		88,727	49,159	54,997	61,148	13,054	267,085	
Registered Electors		119,453	64,696	75,154	83,381		342,684	
Turnout		74.28%	75.98%	73.18%	73.34%		77.94%	

=== 2015 presidential election ===
Results of the 7th presidential election held on 8 January 2015:

Candidate	Party	Votes per Polling Division				Postal Votes	Total Votes	%
Candidate	Party	Dambulla	Laggala	Matale	Rattota	Postal Votes	Total Votes	%
Mahinda Rajapaksa	UPFA	57,657	33,821	26,684	32,235	8,483	158,880	51.41%
Maithripala Sirisena	NDF	47,652	21,511	36,052	37,319	8,394	145,928	47.22%
R. A. Sirisena	PNF	205	170	123	141	5	649	0.21%
Namal Rajapaksa	ONF	158	136	65	137	4	500	0.16%
A. S. P. Liyanage	SLLP	92	73	101	125	3	394	0.13%
M. I. Mohanmed Mishlar	UPF	104	59	91	134	4	392	0.13%
R. Peduru Arachchi	ULPP	74	72	96	134	4	380	0.12%
Aithurus M. Illias	Ind 1	90	52	77	86	1	306	0.1%
Siritunga Jayasuriya	USP	66	42	72	102	3	285	0.09%
Duminda Nagamuwa	FSP	79	39	54	72	7	251	0.08%
Sarath Manamendra	NSH	75	50	44	71	1	241	0.08%
Anurudha Polgampola	Ind 2	36	30	40	45	1	152	0.05%
Sundaram Mahendran	NSSP	24	33	36	40	2	135	0.04%
M. B. Theminimulla	ACAKO	36	22	25	36	0	119	0.04%
Vajirapani Wijesiriwardene	SEP	27	11	28	31	0	97	0.03%
Ven.Battaramulla; Seelarathana Thero	JSP	30	12	15	28	3	88	0.03%
Prasanna Priyankara	DNM	25	13	11	34	4	87	0.03%
Jayantha Kulathunga	ULGC	27	17	9	25	3	81	0.03%
Wimal Geeganage	SLNF	15	10	14	17	1	57	0.02%
Valid Votes		101,472	56,178	63,637	70,812	16,923	309,022	100.00%
Rejected Votes		1,074	581	773	1,079	146	3,653	1.17%
Total Polled		102,546	56,759	64,410	71,891	17,069	312,675	82.35%
Registered Electors		131,831	70,323	84,225	93,296	17,330	379,675	

=== 2019 presidential election ===
Results of the 8th presidential election held on 16 November 2019:

Candidate	Party	Votes per Polling Division				Postal Votes	Total Votes	%
Candidate	Party	Dambulla	Laggala	Matale	Rattota	Postal Votes	Total Votes	%
Gotabaya Rajapaksa	SLPP	68,177	36,363	32,486	37,390	13,405	187,821	55.37%
Sajith Premadasa	NDF	37,717	21,384	33,251	35,774	6,165	134,291	39.59%
Anura Kumara Dissanayake	NMPP	3,221	1,070	1,895	1,717	987	8,890	2.62%
Mahesh Senanayake	NPP	241	107	223	215	113	899	0.26%
Ajantha Perera	SPSL	307	179	129	222	13	850	0.25%
Ariyawansa Dissanayake	DUNF	240	171	159	232	17	825	0.24%
M. L. A. M. Hizbullah	Ind 11	222	159	140	187	16	724	0.21%
Rohan Pallewatte	JSWP	255	123	108	147	12	645	0.19%
Siripala Amarasinghe	Ind 02	120	69	102	156	12	459	0.14%
Ajantha de zoysa	RJP	141	90	68	118	5	422	0.12%
Milroy Fernando	Ind 09	89	62	71	135	3	360	0.11%
Ven.Battaramulla; Seelarathana Thero	JSP	101	53	77	109	1	341	0.1%
Anuruddha Polgampola	Ind 08	60	47	72	118	4	301	0.09%
Jayantha Ketagoda	Ind 07	78	65	40	83	1	267	0.08%
Namal Rajapaksa	NUA	84	68	48	54	7	261	0.08%
Subramanium Gunaratnam	ONF	56	43	44	68	1	212	0.06%
Ven.Aparekke; Punnananda Thero	Ind 01	41	26	33	56	14	170	0.05%
A. S. P. Liyanage	SLLP	32	36	37	53	1	159	0.05%
Duminda Nagamuwa	FSP	58	25	19	33	13	148	0.04%
Aithurus M. Illiyas	Ind 03	31	23	32	26	2	114	0.03%
Piyasiri Wijenayake	Ind 13	33	31	24	24	1	113	0.03%
Sarath Manamendra	NSU	30	30	19	27	0	106	0.03%
Aruna de soyza	DNM	36	16	18	26	1	97	0.03%
Rajiva Wijesinha	Ind 14	30	12	27	23	0	92	0.03%
Siritunga Jayasuriya	USP	24	17	16	30	3	90	0.03%
Vajirapani Wijesiriwardene	SEP	23	11	21	23	2	80	0.02%
A. H. M. Alavi	Ind 04	21	13	17	25	1	77	0.02%
M. K. Shivajilingam	Ind 10	20	8	22	17	0	67	0.02%
Saman Perera	OPPP	15	14	16	19	1	65	0.02%
Ashoka Wadigamangawa	Ind 12	15	14	8	19	0	56	0.02%
Priyantha Edirisinghe	ACAKO	14	6	11	19	2	52	0.02%
Sarath Keerthirathna	Ind 05	13	13	11	15	0	52	0.02%
Samaraweera Weerawanni	Ind 15	8	14	8	16	4	50	0.01%
B. G. Nandimithra	NSSP	15	8	5	22	0	48	0.01%
Samansiri Herath	Ind 06	6	2	4	5	0	17	0.00%
Valid Votes		111,572	60,378	69,261	77,203	20,807	339,221	100.00%
Rejected Votes		1,000	501	812	678	261	3,252	0.81%
Total Polled		112,572	60,879	70,073	77,881	21,068	342,473	85.3%
Registered Electors		132,221	69,632	84,846	93,503	21,294	401,496	

=== 2024 presidential election ===
Results of the 9th presidential election held on 21 September 2024:

Candidate	Party	Votes per Polling Division				Postal Votes	Total Votes	%
Candidate	Party	Dambulla	Laggala	Matale	Rattota	Postal Votes	Total Votes	%
Anura Kumara Dissanayake	NPP	53,299	20,838	27,693	26,528	12,186	140,544	41.37%
Sajith Premadasa	SJB	36,684	24,828	25,117	31,358	3,816	121,803	35.85%
Ranil Wickremesinghe	Ind16	16,285	9,022	11,712	12,567	4,243	53,829	15.84%
Namal Rajapaksa	SLPP	3,263	2,756	1,691	2,245	372	10,327	3.04%
Dilith Jayaweera	SLCP	951	429	690	637	128	2,835	0.83%
K. K. Piyadasa	Ind04	406	318	223	403	15	1,365	0.4%
D. M. Bandaranayake	Ind13	501	228	231	238	27	1,225	0.36%
Wijeyadasa Rajapakshe	JPF	263	183	154	256	12	868	0.26%
Sarath Fonseka	Ind12	185	138	129	164	21	637	0.19%
Anuruddha Polgampola	Ind11	175	94	88	119	3	479	0.14%
Sarath Keerthirathne	Ind05	167	79	77	118	3	444	0.13%
Suranjeewa Anoj de Silva	DUNF	176	45	92	89	16	418	0.12%
K. R. Krishan	APP	153	99	62	103	1	418	0.12%
Ven.Akmeemana; Dayarathana Thero	Ind01	122	83	82	116	9	412	0.12%
Priyantha Wickremesinghe	NSSP	119	80	78	110	10	397	0.12%
Victor Anthony Perera	Ind10	100	74	58	98	1	331	0.1%
Ajantha de Zoyza	RJA	104	55	56	94	8	317	0.09%
Namal Rajapaksa	SBP	101	68	54	73	17	313	0.09%
Siripala Amarasinghe	Ind02	99	65	50	79	0	293	0.09%
Siritunga Jayasuriya	USP	67	56	51	112	4	290	0.09%
Pakkiyaselvam Ariyanethiran	Ind09	30	23	96	31	3	203	0.06%
Ven.Battaramulle; Seelarathana Thero	JSP	58	30	34	72	4	198	0.06%
Pemasiri Manage	Ind14	56	41	28	58	0	183	0.05%
Abubakar Mohamed Infaz	DUA	54	34	31	62	0	181	0.05%
Nuwan Bopege	SPF	60	16	29	69	6	180	0.05%
Mahinda Dewage	SLSP	65	24	26	23	1	139	0.04%
Oshala Herath	NIF	50	31	20	34	3	138	0.04%
Vajirapani Wijesiriwardene	SEP	46	18	32	32	0	128	0.04%
P. W. S. K. Bandaranayake	NDF	36	25	18	35	3	117	0.03%
Ananda Kularatne	Ind06	38	27	27	18	1	111	0.03%
Keerthi Wickremeratne	AJP	33	30	21	24	2	110	0.03%
Sidney Jayarathna	Ind07	32	22	17	24	0	95	0.03%
Roshan Ranasinghe	Ind15	33	19	18	18	6	94	0.03%
Lalith De Silva	UNFP	31	21	11	19	3	85	0.03%
Janaka Ratnayake	ULPP	19	9	14	20	1	63	0.02%
Mylvanagam Thilakarajah	Ind08	12	12	20	14	0	58	0.02%
Sarath Manamendra	NSU	17	10	13	12	1	53	0.02%
A. S. P. Liyanage	SLLP	14	9	14	14	2	53	0.02%
Valid Votes		113,904	59,939	68,857	76,106	20,928	339,734	100.00%
Rejected Votes		2,104	1,338	1,813	2,182	484	7,921	2.28%
Total Polled		116,008	61,277	70,670	78,288	21,412	347,655	80.85%
Registered Electors		143,731	73,955	90,943	99,695	21,667	429,991	

Preferential votes

1,909	2,211
Anura Kumara Dissanayake	Sajith Premadasa

== Parliamentary General Elections ==
=== 1989 parliamentary general election ===
Results of the 9th parliamentary election held on 15 February 1989 for the district:

Party	Votes per Polling Division				Postal Votes	Total Votes	%	Seats
Party	Dambulla	Laggala	Matale	Rattota	Postal Votes	Total Votes	%	Seats
United National Party (Note: Including the Ceylon Workers' Congress.)	23,381	19,839	21,422	22,019	2,208	88,869	63.81%	4
Sri Lanka Freedom Party	18,786	7,143	8,553	10,225	1,010	45,717	32.82%	1
United Lanka People's Party	882	157	364	912	35	2,350	1.69%	0
United Socialist Alliance (Note: Including the CPSL, LSSP, NSSP, SLMP.)	445	350	773	710	66	2,344	1.68%	0
Valid Votes	43,494	27,489	31,112	33,866	3,319	139,280	100.00%	5
Rejected Votes	3,818	2,453	2,445	3,079	132	11,927		
Total Polled	47,312	29,942	33,557	36,945	3,451	151,207		
Registered Electors	71,722	40,656	47,520	51,452	3,588	214,938		
Turnout	65.97%	73.65%	70.62%	71.80%	96.18%	70.35%		

The following candidates were elected:

Preferential votes
Alliance	Party	Candidate	votes
UNP	UNP	J. Wijeratna Banda	31,635
UNP	UNP	Alick Aluwihare	31,004
UNP	UNP	P. B. Kaviratne	23,541
UNP	UNP	V. G. Jinadasa	22,941
SLFP	SLFP	Nandimithra Ekanayake	17,941

=== 1994 parliamentary general election ===
Results of the 10th parliamentary election held on 16 August 1994 for the district:

Party	Votes per Polling Division				Postal Votes	Total Votes	%	Seats
Party	Dambulla	Laggala	Matale	Rattota	Postal Votes	Total Votes	%	Seats
People's Alliance (Note: Including the SLFP et al..)	34,286	20,648	20,607	22,856	4,283	102,680	49.85%	3
United National Party (Note: Including the Ceylon Workers' Congress.)	30,468	17,970	22,446	26,283	2,954	100,121	48.61%	2
Independent Group	597	437	294	390	10	1,728	0.84%	0
Sri Lanka Progressive Front (Note: Including the JVP.)	600	153	338	266	76	1,433	0.70%	0
Valid Votes	65,951	39,208	43,685	49,795	7,323	205,962	100.00%	5
Rejected Votes	3,881	2,618	2,630	3,393	124	12,646		
Total Polled	69,832	41,826	46,315	53,188	7,447	218,608		
Registered Electors	85,870	48,525	58,638	66,238		259,271		
Turnout	81.32%	86.19%	78.98%	80.30%		84.32%		

The following candidates were elected:

Preferential votes
Alliance	Party	Candidate	votes
UNP	UNP	Alick Aluwihare	61,526
PA	SLFP	Janaka Bandara Tennakoon	52,437
PA	SLFP	Nandimithra Ekanayake	51,919
PA	SLFP	Monty Gopallawa	40,555
UNP	UNP	V. G. Jinadasa	35,474

=== 2000 parliamentary general election ===
Results of the 11th parliamentary election held on 10 October 2000 for the district:

Party	Votes per Polling Division				Postal Votes	Total Votes	%	Seats
Party	Dambulla	Laggala	Matale	Rattota	Postal Votes	Total Votes	%	Seats
People's Alliance (Note: Including the SLFP et al..)	35,421	23,692	19,877	27,615	3,608	110,213	50.53%	3
United National Party	30,455	14,941	22,089	21,331	3,020	91,836	42.11%	2
Janatha Vimukthi Peramuna	4,396	1,283	2,233	2,138	623	10,673	4.89%	0
New Left Front (Note: Including the NSSP et al..)	778	460	440	660	12	2,350	1.08%	0
Sinhala Heritage	279	65	618	391	105	1,458	0.67%	0
United Lanka Great Council	109	94	86	80	0	369	0.17%	0
Citizen's Front	73	61	90	108	14	346	0.16%	0
Liberal Party	38	31	51	57	2	179	0.08%	0
Sinhalaye Mahasammatha; Bhoomiputra Pakshaya	37	19	40	48	14	158	0.07%	0
Democratic United National; Front	56	31	18	37	2	144	0.07%	0
Sri Lanka Muslim Party	33	8	22	31	2	96	0.04%	0
National Development Front	43	15	11	16	1	86	0.04%	0
Independent Group	16	13	13	33	0	75	0.03%	0
Sri Lanka Progressive Front	15	8	23	19	0	65	0.03%	0
People's Freedom Front	7	7	15	18	2	49	0.02%	0
Valid Votes	71,756	40,728	45,626	52,582	7,405	218,097	100.00%	5
Rejected Votes	5,385	2,843	3,334	4,002	155	15,719		
Total Polled	77,141	43,571	48,960	56,584	7,560	233,816		
Registered Electors	99,756	54,910	65,389	72,597		292,652		
Turnout	77.33%	79.35%	74.87%	77.94%		79.90%		

The following candidates were elected:

Preferential votes
Alliance	Party	Candidate	votes
UNP	UNP	Ranjith Aluwihare	62,911
UNP	UNP	Alick Aluwihare	60,419
PA	SLFP	Janaka Bandara Tennakoon	42,366
PA	SLFP	Monty Gopallawa	40,397
PA	SLFP	Nandimithra Ekanayake	39,585

=== 2001 parliamentary general election ===
Results of the 12th parliamentary election held on 5 December 2001 for the district:

Party	Votes per Polling Division				Postal Votes	Total Votes	%	Seats
Party	Dambulla	Laggala	Matale	Rattota	Postal Votes	Total Votes	%	Seats
United National Front (Note: Including the UNP, SLMC, CWC, WPF.)	34,066	16,117	28,478	28,088	3,242	109,991	50.43%	3
People's Alliance (Note: Including the SLFP et al.)	29,281	20,938	15,044	20,506	3,230	88,999	40.81%	2
Janatha Vimukthi Peramuna	6,958	2,133	2,816	3,179	977	16,063	7.37%	0
New Left Front (Note: Including the NSSP et al.)	649	402	306	453	14	1,824	0.84%	0
United Lalith Front	130	64	85	85	1	365	0.17%	0
Independent Group	76	40	31	75	1	223	0.10%	0
Liberal Party	55	37	23	37	0	152	0.07%	0
United Sinhala Great Council	36	10	31	60	2	139	0.06%	0
People's Freedom Front	24	25	15	39	0	103	0.05%	0
Sri Lanka Muslim Party	45	13	15	21	2	96	0.04%	0
National Development Front	27	10	13	17	0	67	0.03%	0
Sri Lanka National Front	12	8	11	9	0	40	0.02%	0
Ruhunu People's Party	10	4	5	9	0	28	0.01%	0
Valid Votes	71,369	39,801	46,873	52,578	7,469	218,090	100.00%	5
Rejected Votes	5,225	2,740	3,106	4,253	125	15,449	1.65%	
Total Polled	76,594	42,541	49,979	56,831	7,594	233,539		
Registered Electors	102,302	56,244	67,034	74,026		299,606		
Turnout	74.87%	75.64%	74.56%	76.77%		77.95%		

The following candidates were elected:

Preferential votes
Alliance	Party	Candidate	votes
UNF	UNP	Alick Aluwihare	75,620
UNF	UNP	Ranjith Aluwihare	72,553
PA	SLFP	Janaka Bandara Tennakoon	49,959
UNF	UNP	Sanjeeva Kaviratne	37,226
PA	SLFP	S. B. Yalegama	35,450

=== 2004 parliamentary general election ===
Results of the 13th parliamentary election held on 2 April 2004 for the district:

Party	Votes per Polling Division				Postal Votes	Total Votes	%	Seats
Party	Dambulla	Laggala	Matale	Rattota	Postal Votes	Total Votes	%	Seats
United People's Freedom; Alliance (Note: Including the SLFP, JVP.)	40,616	21,307	18,496	22,747	5,093	108,259	49.19%	3
United National Front (Note: Including the UNP, SLMC, CWC, WPF.)	29,456	18,784	24,058	25,330	3,014	100,642	45.73%	2
Jathika Hela Urumaya	1,982	579	3,135	2,611	512	8,819	4.01%	0
United Socialist Party	264	220	263	383	5	1,135	0.52%	0
National Development Front	64	34	89	81	3	271	0.12%	0
National People's Party	77	29	67	90	4	267	0.12%	0
Independent Group 6	91	43	48	80	1	263	0.12%	0
New Left Front (Note: Including the NSSP et al.)	33	10	31	32	3	109	0.05%	0
Independent Group 3	13	16	15	20	0	64	0.03%	0
Independent Group 5	10	11	12	14	1	48	0.02%	0
Independent Group 1	9	5	13	5	1	33	0.01%	0
Liberal Party	5	1	15	5	1	27	0.01%	0
Sri Lanka Muslim Party	11	1	5	3	0	20	0.01%	0
Sri Lanka National Front	2	11	1	6	0	20	0.01%	0
Sinhalaye Mahasammatha; Bhoomiputra Pakshaya	9	2	5	4	0	20	0.01%	0
Independent Group 2	4	4	7	3	1	19	0.01%	0
Ruhunu People's Party	5	1	1	7	1	15	0.01%	0
Independent Group 4	2	2	3	5	1	13	0.01%	0
Swarajya Party	3	3	2	2	0	10	0.00%	0
Sri Lanka Progressive Front	4	3	0	1	0	8	0.00%	0
Valid Votes	72,660	41,066	46,266	51,429	8,641	220,062	100.00%	5
Rejected Votes	6,905	3,598	3,273	4,959	177	18,912		
Total Polled	79,565	44,664	49,539	56,388	8,818	238,974		
Registered Electors	107,353	58,799	69,860	76,544		312,556		
Turnout	74.12%	75.96%	70.91%	73.67%		76.46%		

The following candidates were elected:

Preferential votes
Alliance	Party	Candidate	votes
UPFA	JVP	Sujatha Alahakoon	57,234
UPFA	SLFP	Janaka Bandara Tennakoon	54,711
UNF	UNP	Ranjith Aluwihare	47,152
UNF	UNP	Alick Aluwihare (Note: Alick Aluwihare (UNF-UNP) died on 17 May 2009. His replacement Nandimithra Ekanayake (UNF-UNP) was sworn in on 9 June 2009.)	39,649
UPFA	SLFP	Rohana Dissanayake	37,091

=== 2010 parliamentary general election ===
Results of the 14th parliamentary election held on 8 April 2010 for the district:

Party	Votes per Polling Division				Postal Votes	Total Votes	%	Seats
Party	Dambulla	Laggala	Matale	Rattota	Postal Votes	Total Votes	%	Seats
United People's Freedom; Alliance (Note: Including the SLFP.)	42,847	27,777	23,734	26,818	9,893	131,069	66.96%	4
United National Front (Note: Including the UNP, SLMC, DPF, SLFP(P).)	15,080	8,478	14,659	14,666	2,854	55,737	28.47%	1
Democratic National; Alliance (Note: Including the JVP, DNF et al.)	2,645	688	1,974	1,574	755	7,636	3.90%	0
Our National Front	57	48	34	21	3	163	0.08%	0
National Development Front	28	14	34	46	6	128	0.07%	0
Independent Group 1	18	30	26	17	5	96	0.05%	0
Independent Group 7	12	3	9	68	0	92	0.05%	0
Independent Group 11	22	33	8	27	0	90	0.05%	0
Independent Group 9	26	17	16	25	2	86	0.04%	0
United National Alternative; Front	14	13	18	29	2	76	0.04%	0
Independent Group 2	19	6	28	22	0	75	0.04%	0
Sri Lanka National Front	4	19	34	11	7	75	0.04%	0
Independent Group 6	12	6	17	16	0	51	0.03%	0
Independent Group 5	22	4	8	7	4	45	0.02%	0
United Lanka Great Council	6	16	9	8	0	39	0.02%	0
Independent Group 8	7	1	14	12	5	39	0.02%	0
Independent Group 10	7	16	5	10	0	38	0.02%	0
Janasetha Peramuna	24	4	2	3	4	37	0.02%	0
United Democratic Front	13	4	8	8	3	36	0.02%	0
Independent Group 4	10	11	5	6	0	32	0.02%	0
Patriotic National Front	4	7	5	5	1	22	0.01%	0
Left Liberation Front	4	3	5	8	0	20	0.01%	0
Independent Group 3	5	4	1	4	2	16	0.01%	0
Sri Lanka Labour Party	2	2	4	4	3	15	0.01%	0
Sinhalaye Mahasammatha; Bhoomiputra Pakshaya	2	0	8	2	1	13	0.01%	0
All Are Citizens All Are; Kings Organisation	4	0	2	5	1	12	0.01%	0
Ruhuna People's Party	4	0	3	3	2	12	0.01%	0
Valid Votes	60,898	37,204	40,670	43,425	13,553	195,750	100.00%	5
Rejected Votes	5,932	3,217	3,990	5,567	604	19,310		
Total Polled	66,830	40,421	44,660	48,992	14,157	215,060		
Registered Electors	119,453	64,696	75,154	83,381		342,684		
Turnout	55.95%	62.48%	59.42%	58.76%		62.76%		

The following candidates were elected:

Preferential votes
Alliance	Party	Candidate	votes
UPFA	SLFP	Lakshman Wasantha Perera	65,077
UPFA	SLFP	Janaka Bandara Tennakoon	47,133
UPFA	UNP	Nandimithra Ekanayake	35,754
UPFA	SLFP	Rohana Dissanayake	32,803
UNF	UNP	Wasantha Aluwihare	31,529

=== 2015 parliamentary general election ===
Results of the 15th parliamentary election held on 17 August 2015:

Party	Votes per Polling Division				Postal Votes	Total Votes	%	Seats
Party	Dambulla	Laggala	Matale	Rattota	Postal Votes	Total Votes	%	Seats
United National Front for Good Governance (Note: The alliance consisted of ACMC, DNM, JHU, MTNA, NFGG, SLMC, TPA (DPF, NUW and UCPF), ULF and UNP.)	40,378	20,867	33,056	35,313	8,627	138,241	49.84%	3
United People's Freedom; Alliance (Note: The alliance consisted of CF, DNF, DPC, LBSL, MEP, NC, NFF, PHU, SA (CPSL, DLF, LSSP, NLPP, SLFP, TMVP and UCF.)	45,550	26,748	21,255	24,872	7,890	126,315	45.54%	2
Janatha Vimukthi Peramuna	3,562	1,324	2,389	2,419	1,253	10,947	3.95%	0
Bodu Jana Peramuna	62	38	110	144	48	402	0.14%	0
Democratic Party	88	30	106	96	55	375	0.14%	0
Sri Lanka People's Party	106	50	64	59	2	281	0.10%	0
United People's Party	49	37	29	60	4	179	0.06%	0
Frontline Socialist Party	72	12	23	17	17	141	0.05%	0
All Ceylon Tamil Great; Council	27	32	17	32	1	109	0.04%	0
Independent Group 08	19	12	16	21	0	68	0.02%	0
Independent Group 03	15	7	12	10	0	44	0.02%	0
Independent Group 06	9	7	10	12	0	38	0.01%	0
United Lanka People's Party	14	8	6	7	2	37	0.01%	0
Independent Group 07	18	6	4	5	0	33	0.01%	0
Independent Group 04	6	5	10	5	1	27	0.01%	0
Independent Group 05	5	7	6	8	0	26	0.01%	0
Janasetha Peramuna	7	6	3	8	2	26	0.01%	0
All Citizens are All Kings; Organization	14	1	2	5	2	24	0.01%	0
Independent Group 01	5	6	2	9	2	24	0.01%	0
Independent Group 02	5	8	5	1	0	19	0.01%	0
New Sinhala Heritage	2	0	7	4	0	13	0.00%	0
Sri Lanka Labour Party	2	1	5	3	0	11	0.00%	0
Valid Votes	90,015	49,212	57,137	63,110	17,906	277,380	100.00%	5
Rejected Votes	6,671	4,292	4,043	6,014	517	21,537	7.21%	
Total Polled	96,686	53,504	61,180	69,124	18,423	298,917	78.73%	
Registered Electors	131,837	70,323	84,225	93,296		379,675		

Preferential votes
Alliance	Party	Candidate	votes
UNFGG	UNP	Wasantha Aluwihare	79,309
UPFA	SLFP	Lakshman Wasantha Perera	75,926
UNFGG	UNP	Ranjith Aluwihare	74,785
UPFA	SLFP	Janaka Bandara Tennakoon	61,920
UNFGG	UNP	Rohini Kumari Wijerathna	41,766

=== 2020 parliamentary general election ===
Results of the 16th parliamentary election held on 5 August 2020:

Party	Votes per Polling Division				Postal Votes	Total Votes	%	Seats
Party	Dambulla	Laggala	Matale	Rattota	Postal Votes	Total Votes	%	Seats
Sri Lanka People's Freedom; Alliance (Note: The alliance consisted of SLFP, CWC, CPSL, DLF, DVJP, EPDP, LSSP, MEP, MTK, NC, NFF, PHU, SLMP, SLPP, TMVP, UPP & VDJS.)	65,667	35,967	33,927	38,254	14,954	188,779	65.53%	4
Samagi Jana Balawegaya (Note: The alliance consisted of JHU, SLMC, TPA (NUW, DPF, UCPF), ACMC, NLNP & JSP.)	20,344	12,529	18,272	19,415	3,395	73,955	25.67%	1
National People's Power (Note: Including JVP.)	2,326	833	1,757	1,598	1,028	7,542	2.62%	0
United National Party	2,783	669	1,185	1,261	694	6,592	2.29%	0
Our Power of People's Party	999	376	1,327	1,116	166	3,984	1.38%	0
Independent Group 03	430	30	593	1,813	38	2,904	1.01%	0
Independent Group 10	136	98	88	116	10	448	0.16%	0
Independent Group 05	137	88	76	119	8	428	0.15%	0
Independent Group 06	77	64	95	118	5	359	0.12%	0
Socialist Party of Sri Lanka	130	67	55	94	2	348	0.12%	0
Independent Group 07	29	24	117	153	7	330	0.11%	0
Jana Setha Peramuna	85	63	71	80	9	308	0.11%	0
Sinhaladeepa National Front	39	34	149	68	16	306	0.11%	0
Frontline Socialist Party	106	51	43	67	11	278	0.1%	0
Independent Group 08	65	36	67	66	5	239	0.08%	0
Sri Lanka Labour Party	74	47	39	59	6	225	0.08%	0
Independent Group 01	47	37	44	62	8	198	0.07%	0
Democratic United National; Front	41	43	37	52	9	182	0.06%	0
Liberal Party	43	49	24	52	3	171	0.06%	0
National People's Party	58	33	28	29	4	152	0.05%	0
Independent Group 02	34	15	35	36	5	125	0.04%	0
Independent Group 09	26	21	29	44	3	123	0.04%	0
Independent Group 04	30	28	11	27	1	97	0.03%	0
Valid Votes	93,706	51,202	58,069	64,699	20,397	288,073	100.00%	5
Rejected Votes	7,875	4,435	4,714	6,527	952	24,503	6.01%	
Total Polled	101,581	55,637	62,783	71,226	21,349	312,576	76.69%	
Registered Electors	134,443	70,392	86,032	94,725	21,977	407,569		

Preferential votes
Alliance	Party	Candidate	votes
SLPFA	SLPP	Janaka Bandara Tennakoon	73,296
SLPFA	SLPP	Nalaka Kottegoda	71,404
SLPFA	SLPP	Pramitha Tennakoon	67,776
SLPFA	SLPP	Rohana Dissanayake	50,368
SJB	SJB	Rohini Kumari Wijerathna	27,587

== Provincial Council Elections ==
=== 1988 provincial council election ===
Results of the 1st Central provincial council election held on 2 June 1988

Party	Total Votes	%	Seats
United National Party	57,225	59.37%	6
United Socialist Alliance (Note: Including the CPSL, LSSP, NSSP & SLMP)	32,923	34.16%	4
Sri Lanka Muslim Congress	6,229	6.46%	1
Valid Votes	96,377	100.00%	11

=== 1993 provincial council election ===
Results of the 2nd Central provincial council election held on 17 May 1993:

Party	Votes	%	Seats
United National Party	94,376	53.17%	6
People's Alliance (Note: Including the SLFP et al.)	46,322	26.1%	3
Democratic United National Front	31,299	17.63%	2
Sri Lanka Muslim Congress	4,153	2.34%	0
Nava Sama Samaja Party	1,334	0.75%	0
Valid Votes	177,484	100.00%	11

=== 1999 provincial council election ===
Results of the 3rd Central provincial council election held on 6 April 1999 for the district:

Party	Votes per Polling Division				Postal Votes	Total Votes	%	Seats
Party	Dambulla	Laggala	Matale	Rattota	Postal Votes	Total Votes	%	Seats
People's Alliance (Note: Including the SLFP, SLMC et al.)	31,586	22,192	16,556	23,015	1,766	95,115	51.38%	6
United National Party	23,887	12,651	16,742	15,736	1,689	70,705	38.2%	4
National Union of Workers (Note: Including the CWC, DWC.)	228	885	3,303	4,871	19	9,306	5.03%	1
Janatha Vimukthi Peramuna	3,044	1,380	1,667	1,652	267	8,010	4.33%	0
Mahajana Eksath Peramuna	429	182	418	362	62	1,453	0.78%	0
Independent Group	89	75	178	166	8	516	0.28%	0
Valid Votes	59,263	37,365	38,864	45,802	3,811	185,105	100.00%	11
Rejected Votes	4,878	3,056	3,494	4,691	138	16,257	8.07%	
Total Polled	64,141	40,421	42,358	50,493	3,949	201,362	71.64%	
Registered Electors	95,125	52,861	62,744	70,359		281,089		

The following candidates were elected:

Preferential votes
Party	Candidate	votes
UNP	Wasantha Aluwihare	42,689
PA	Bandula Yalegama	30,342
PA	Sarath Ekanayake	27,966
PA	W. M. Yasamana	26,559
PA	L. D. Nimalasiri	17,722
UNP	Sanjeeva Kaviratne	17,559
PA	Dhammika Ransiri	16,811
UNP	Rohana Bandaranayake	15,130
UNP	Mohan Weerakoon	15,031
PA	K. H. M. G. Seneviratne	12,256
NUW	Muthusamy Sivagnanam	5,967

=== 2004 provincial council election ===
Results of the 4th Central provincial council election held on 10 July 2004 for the district:

Party	Votes per Polling Division				Postal Votes	Total Votes	%	Seats
Party	Dambulla	Laggala	Matale	Rattota	Postal Votes	Total Votes	%	Seats
United People's Freedom; Alliance (Note: Including the SLFP, JVP.)	32,668	20,551	15,496	19,981	3,814	92,510	56.12%	6
United National Party	19,831	12,352	16,988	18,124	2,014	69,309	42.04%	4
United Socialist Party	259	238	270	379	6	1,152	0.70%	0
Up-Country People's Front	104	48	629	350	4	1,135	0.69%	0
National Development Front	101	79	80	138	1	399	0.24%	0
Independent Group	32	23	39	22	4	120	0.07%	0
Sinhalaye Mahasammatha; Bhoomiputra Pakshaya	23	18	33	33	10	117	0.07%	0
National People's Party	15	14	21	10	2	62	0.04%	0
Sri Lanka Muslim Party	15	10	17	11	0	53	0.03%	0
Valid Votes	53,048	33,333	33,573	39,048	5,855	164,857	100.00%	10
Rejected Votes	3,808	2,250	2,554	3,515	342	12,469		
Total Polled	56,856	35,583	36,127	42,563	6,197	177,326		
Registered Electors	107,353	58,799	69,860	76,544		312,556		
Turnout	52.96%	60.52%	51.71%	55.61%		56.73%		

The following candidates were elected:

Preferential votes
Party	Candidate	votes
UNP	Wasantha Aluwihare	33,364
UNP	Nandimithra Ekanayake	27,731
UPFA	Champaka Sugishwara Wijerathna	25,688
UPFA	Bandula Yalegama	24,270
UPFA	W. M. Yasamana	23,637
UPFA	Gamagedara Dissanayake	23,216
UPFA	Sarath Wijesinghe	21,029
UPFA	L. D. Nimalasiri	18,954
UNP	Sanjeeva Kaviratne	15,728
UNP	Rohana Bandaranayake	12,452

=== 2009 provincial council election ===
Results of the 5th Central provincial council election held on 14 February 2009 for the district:

Party	Votes per Polling Division				Postal Votes	Total Votes	%	Seats
Party	Dambulla	Laggala	Matale	Rattota	Postal Votes	Total Votes	%	Seats
United People's Freedom; Alliance (Note: Including the SLFP.)	49,785	27,169	25,759	30,826	6,756	140,295	69.48%	7
United National Party	14,668	9,912	14,789	15,139	1,501	56,009	27.74%	3
Janatha Vimukthi Peramuna	1,568	759	740	808	209	4,084	2.02%	0
National Development Front	94	84	79	118	3	378	0.19%	0
United National Alliance	91	63	75	114	3	346	0.17%	0
Independent Group 8	30	40	74	61	2	207	0.10%	0
Independent Group 4	14	1	10	87	0	112	0.06%	0
Independent Group 7	15	12	38	24	0	89	0.04%	0
Left Front (Note: Including NSSP et al.)	12	4	10	33	1	60	0.03%	0
Independent Group 6	13	9	21	11	1	55	0.03%	0
United Lanka Great Council	18	10	8	11	3	50	0.02%	0
National People's Party	23	12	5	7	1	48	0.02%	0
Independent Group 5	5	9	13	19	0	46	0.02%	0
Independent Group 1	7	3	7	9	2	28	0.01%	0
Sinhalaye Mahasammatha; Bhoomiputra Pakshaya	8	4	3	3	4	22	0.01%	0
Independent Group 3	5	2	8	5	1	21	0.01%	0
Patriotic National Front	10	2	2	5	1	20	0.01%	0
Sri Lanka Progressive Front	5	2	2	4	1	14	0.01%	0
Independent Group 2	3	6	3	2	0	14	0.01%	0
Ruhuna People's Party	2	1	6	3	1	13	0.01%	0
Valid Votes	66,376	38,104	41,652	47,289	8,490	201,911	100.00%	10
Rejected Votes	4,785	3,158	3,476	4,780	296	16,495		
Total Polled	71,161	41,262	45,128	52,069	8,786	218,406		
Registered Electors	117,788	64,147	74,839	82,172		338,946		
Turnout	60.41%	64.32%	60.30%	63.37%		64.44%		

The following candidates were elected:

Preferential votes
Party	Candidate	votes
UPFA	Pramitha Tennakoon	49,665
UPFA	Nandimithra Ekanayake	35,995
UPFA	W. M. Yasamana	32,991
UPFA	Bandula Yalegama	30,878
UNP	Wasantha Aluwihare	28,855
UPFA	L. D. Nimalasiri	27,958
UPFA	Parakrama Dissanayake	25,903
UPFA	Champaka Sugishwara Wijerathna	25,754
UNP	Sanjeeva Kaviratne	15,845
UNP	Rohana Bandaranayake	13,341

=== 2013 provincial council election ===
Results of the 6th provincial council election held on 21 September 2013 for the district:

Party	Votes per Polling Division				Postal Votes	Total Votes	%	Seats
Party	Dambulla	Laggala	Matale	Rattota	Postal Votes	Total Votes	%	Seats
United People's Freedom; Alliance (Note: Including SLFP et al.)	48,505	26,351	23,138	29,568	7,566	135,128	59.99%	8
United National Party	19,144	12,525	15,025	14,103	2,568	63,365	28.13%	3
Ceylon Workers' Congress	107	1,703	3,580	5,040	68	10,498	4.66%	1
Sri Lanka Muslim Congress	1,235	44	2,994	2,351	27	6,651	1.96%	0
Democratic Party	806	259	1,231	1,402	725	4,423	1.75%	0
Janatha Vimukthi Peramuna	1,539	524	814	776	284	3,937	0.09%	0
Our National Front	71	33	41	47	7	199	0.07%	0
Jana Setha Peramuna	123	9	6	19	4	161	0.06%	0
Independent Group 7	36	24	20	51	2	133	0.06%	0
Independent Group 5	28	25	28	42	2	125	0.05%	0
United Lanka People's Party	34	27	29	22	5	117	0.04%	0
Independent Group 1	12	12	25	46	4	99	0.03%	0
Independent Group 4	7	6	9	50	3	75	0.03%	0
Patriotic National Front	9	5	26	17	9	66	0.03%	0
Independent Group 6	25	10	13	18	0	66	0.03%	0
United Lanka Great Council	14	8	13	12	2	49	0.02%	0
Sri Lanka Labour Party	5	6	14	21	3	49	0.02%	0
Ruhunu People's Party	3	9	14	21	0	47	0.02%	0
Independent Group 2	8	13	8	14	4	47	0.02%	0
Independent Group 3	6	8	8	7	4	33	0.01%	0
Valid Votes	71,717	41,601	47,036	53,627	11,287	225,268	100.00%	12
Rejected Votes	4,110	2,830	3,265	4,565	566	15,336	6.37%	
Total Polled	75,827	44,431	50,301	58,192	11,853	240,604	65.63%	
Registered Electors	127,483	68,234	80,854	89,978		366,549		

The following candidates were elected:

Preferential votes
Party	Candidate	votes
UPFA	Pramitha Tennakoon	51,591
UPFA	Bandula Yalegama	45,460
UNP	Ranjith Aluwihare	29,542
UPFA	Parakrama Dissanayake	24,686
UNP	Sanjeeva Kaviratne	24,249
UPFA	W. M. Yasamana	21,382
UPFA	L. D. Nimalasiri	20,583
UPFA	Chinthana Buddhika Ekanayake	20,052
UPFA	Thilak Bandara	16,247
UPFA	T. D. Jayatissa	14,927
UNP	Rohana bandaranayake	14,415
CWC	Muthusamy Sivagnanam	6,539
