= Pramitha Tennakoon =

Sri Lankan politician

Hon. Premitha Tennakoon MP
- ප්‍රමිත තෙන්නකෝන් பிரமித பண்டார தென்னக்கோன்

Minister of State for Defence
- Incumbent
- Assumed office 8 September 2022
- President: Ranil Wickramasinghe
- Prime Minister: Dinesh Gunawardena

Minister of Ports and Shipping
- In office 18 April 2022 – 9 May 2022
- President: Gotabaya Rajapaksa
- Prime Minister: Mahinda Rajapaksa
- Preceded by: Rohitha Abeygunawardena
- Succeeded by: Nimal Siripala de Silva

Member of the Parliament of Sri Lanka
- Incumbent
- Assumed office 2020
- Constituency: Matale District

Minister for Sports, Youth Affairs, Women's Affairs and Rural Industries Development Central Provincial Council
- In office 2013–2018

Council Member Central Provincial Council
- In office 2009–2018
- Constituency: Matale District

Personal details
- Born: Premitha Bandara Tennakoon; 11 September 1978 (age 48)
- Party: Sri Lanka Podujana Peramuna
- Other political affiliations: SLPFA
- Education: University of Buckingham; La Trobe University

Pramitha Bandara Tennakoon (Sinhala: ප්‍රමිත බණ්ඩාර තෙන්නකෝන්; born 11 September 1978) is a Sri Lankan politician, former Cabinet Minister, former provincial minister and Member of Parliament. He served as the Minister of Ports and Shipping in the Cabinet of President Gotabaya Rajapaksa.

Tennakoon was born on 11 September 1978. He is the son of Janaka Bandara Tennakoon and grandson of T. B. Tennekoon, both government ministers. He was educated at St. Peter's College, Colombo. He has a LLB degree from the University of Buckingham and LLM degree from La Trobe University. He was member of the diplomatic staff the Sri Lankan embassy in Cairo, Egypt.

Tennakoon was a member of the Central Provincial Council and Minister for Sports, Youth Affairs, Women's Affairs and Rural Industries Development for the Central Province. He contested the 2020 parliamentary election as a Sri Lanka People's Freedom Alliance electoral alliance candidate in Matale District and was elected to the Parliament of Sri Lanka.

Following the mass resignation of the Sri Lankan cabinet in the wake of the 2022 Sri Lankan protests, he was appointed as the Minister of Ports and Shipping by President Gotabaya Rajapaksa on 18 April 2022. He served until 9 May 2022 following another mass resignation of the Sri Lankan cabinet.

Electoral history of Pramitha Tennakoon
Election	Constituency	Party	Alliance	Votes	Result
2009 provincial	Matale District		United People's Freedom Alliance	49,665	Elected
2013 provincial	Matale District		United People's Freedom Alliance	51,591	Elected
2020 parliamentary	Matale District	Sri Lanka Podujana Peramuna	Sri Lanka People's Freedom Alliance	67,776	Elected
2024 parliamentary	Matale District		New Democratic Front		Not elected
