= Ministry of Ports and Shipping (Sri Lanka) =

Government ministry of Sri Lanka

Ministry of Ports, Shipping and Aviation
- වරාය, නාවික හා ගුවන් සේවා අමාත්‍යාංශය துறைமுகங்கள், கப்பற்றுறை மற்றும் விமான சேவைகள் அமைச்சு

Ministry overview
- Jurisdiction: Government of Sri Lanka
- Headquarters: 19 Chaithya Road, Colombo 1; 6.938059°N 79.843677°E
- Annual budget: LKR 0.3 billion (2017, recurrent); LKR 2 billion (2017, capital)
- Minister responsible: Vijitha Herath, Minister of Ports, Shipping and Aviation
- Ministry executive: M. M. P. K. Mayadunne, Ministry Secretary
- Child agencies: Sri Lanka Ports Authority; Ceylon Shipping Corporation; Directorate of Merchant Shipping; Shipping and Aviation Information and Research (Private) Limited
- Website: portmin.gov.lk

The Ministry of Ports, Shipping and Aviation (Sinhala: වරාය, නාවික හා ගුවන් සේවා අමාත්‍යාංශය; Tamil: துறைமுகங்கள், கப்பற்றுறை மற்றும் விமான சேவைகள் அமைச்சு) is a cabinet ministry of the Government of Sri Lanka responsible for ports and shipping. The ministry is responsible for formulating and implementing national policy on ports and shipping and other subjects which come under its purview. The current Minister is Vijitha Herath.The ministry's secretary is M.M.P.K. Mayadunne.

== Ministers ==
The Minister of Ports, Shipping and Aviation is a member of the Cabinet of Sri Lanka.

Ministers of Shipping
Name	Portrait	Party	Took office	Left office	Head of government	Ministerial title	Refs
Montague Jayawickrama		United National Party	23 March 1960	1960	Dudley Senanayake	Minister of Nationalised Services, Shipping and Transport	
T. B. Ilangaratne		Sri Lanka Freedom Party	23 July 1960		Sirimavo Bandaranaike	Minister of Commerce, Trade, Food and Shipping	
P. B. G. Kalugalla		Sri Lanka Freedom Party			Sirimavo Bandaranaike	Minister of Shipping, Aviation and Tourism	
Wimala Kannangara		United National Party	23 July 1977		J. R. Jayewardene	Minister of Shipping, Aviation and Tourism	
Lalith Athulathmudali		United National Party			J. R. Jayewardene	Minister of Trade and Shipping	
Abdul Razak Munsoor		United National Party	18 February 1989	28 March 1990	Ranasinghe Premadasa	Minister of Trade and Shipping	
Rupa Karunathilake		United National Party	30 March 1990	14 March 1991	Ranasinghe Premadasa	Minister of Ports and Shipping	
Alick Aluwihare		United National Party	14 March 1991		Ranasinghe Premadasa	Minister of Ports and Shipping	
M. H. M. Ashraff		Sri Lanka Muslim Congress		19 August 1994	D. B. Wijetunga	Minister of Shipping, Ports and Rehabilitation	
Rauff Hakeem		Sri Lanka Muslim Congress	19 October 2000	20 June 2001	Chandrika Kumaratunga	Minister of Internal and International Trade Commerce, Muslim Religious Affairs and Shipping Development	
Mahinda Rajapaksa		Sri Lanka Freedom Party	14 September 2001		Chandrika Kumaratunga	Minister of Ports, Shipping and Fisheries	
Rauff Hakeem		Sri Lanka Muslim Congress	12 December 2001		Chandrika Kumaratunga	Minister of Ports Development and Shipping	
Mangala Samaraweera		Sri Lanka Freedom Party	10 April 2004		Chandrika Kumaratunga	Minister of Ports and Aviation	
Mangala Samaraweera		Sri Lanka Freedom Party	23 November 2005		Mahinda Rajapaksa	Minister of Ports and Aviation	
Mahinda Rajapaksa		Sri Lanka Freedom Party	23 April 2010		Mahinda Rajapaksa	Minister of Ports and Aviation	
Mahinda Rajapaksa		Sri Lanka Freedom Party	22 November 2010		Mahinda Rajapaksa	Minister of Ports and Highways	
Arjuna Ranatunga			12 January 2015		Maithripala Sirisena	Minister of Ports, Shipping and Aviation	
Arjuna Ranatunga		Sri Lanka Freedom Party		22 March 2015	Maithripala Sirisena	Minister of Ports, Shipping and Aviation	
Arjuna Ranatunga		Sri Lanka Freedom Party	22 March 2015		Maithripala Sirisena	Minister of Ports and Shipping	
Arjuna Ranatunga		Democratic National Movement		22 May 2017	Maithripala Sirisena	Minister of Ports and Shipping	
Mahinda Samarasinghe		Sri Lanka Freedom Party	22 May 2017	12 August 2020	Maithripala Sirisena	Minister of Ports and Shipping	
Rohitha Abeygunawardena		12 August 2020	18 April 2022				
Pramitha Tennakoon			18 April 2022				
Lulu Rose		16 June 2026					

== Secretaries ==
Shipping Secretaries
Name	Took office	Left office	Title	Refs
K. V. P. Ranjith de Silva	25 April 2010		Ports and Aviation Secretary	
Sujatha Cooray	22 November 2010		Ports and Highways Secretary	
L. P. Jayampathy	19 January 2015		Ports, Shipping and Aviation Secretary	
L. P. Jayampathy	8 September 2015		Ports and Shipping Affairs Secretary	
