= Nalaka Kottegoda =

Sri Lankan member of Parliament and engineer

Hon. Nalaka Kottegoda MP
- නාලක කෝට්ටේගොඩ நாலக கொட்டேகொட

Member of the Parliament of Sri Lanka
- Incumbent
- Assumed office 2020
- Constituency: Matale District

Personal details
- Born: N. Nalaka Bandara Kottegoda; 14 September 1979 (age 46)
- Party: Sri Lanka Podujana Peramuna
- Other political affiliations: Sri Lanka People's Freedom Alliance
- Occupation: Engineer

N. Nalaka Bandara Kottegoda (born 14 September 1979) is a Sri Lankan engineer, politician and Member of Parliament.

Kottegoda was born on 14 September 1979. He is a member of Viyathmaga (Path of the Learned), a pro-Rajapaksa, nationalist group of academics, businesspeople and professionals. He contested the 2020 parliamentary election as a Sri Lanka People's Freedom Alliance electoral alliance candidate in Matale District and was elected to the Parliament of Sri Lanka.

Electoral history of Nalaka Kottegoda
| Election | Constituency | Party | Alliance | Votes | Result |
|---|---|---|---|---|---|
| 2020 parliamentary | Matale District | Sri Lanka Podujana Peramuna | Sri Lanka People's Freedom Alliance | 71,404 | Elected |
