= Sujatha Alahakoon =

Sri Lankan politician

Hon. Sujatha Alahakoon MP

Member of Parliament for Matale District
- In office 2004–2010

Personal details
- Born: 9 March 1959 (age 67)
- Party: Janatha Vimukthi Peramuna
- Profession: Teacher

Bishajachara Alahakoonlage Sujatha Alahakoon (born 9 March 1959) is a Sri Lankan politician. She is a former representative of Matale for the United People's Freedom Alliance in the Parliament of Sri Lanka.
