= Sanjeeva Kaviratne =

Sri lankan politician

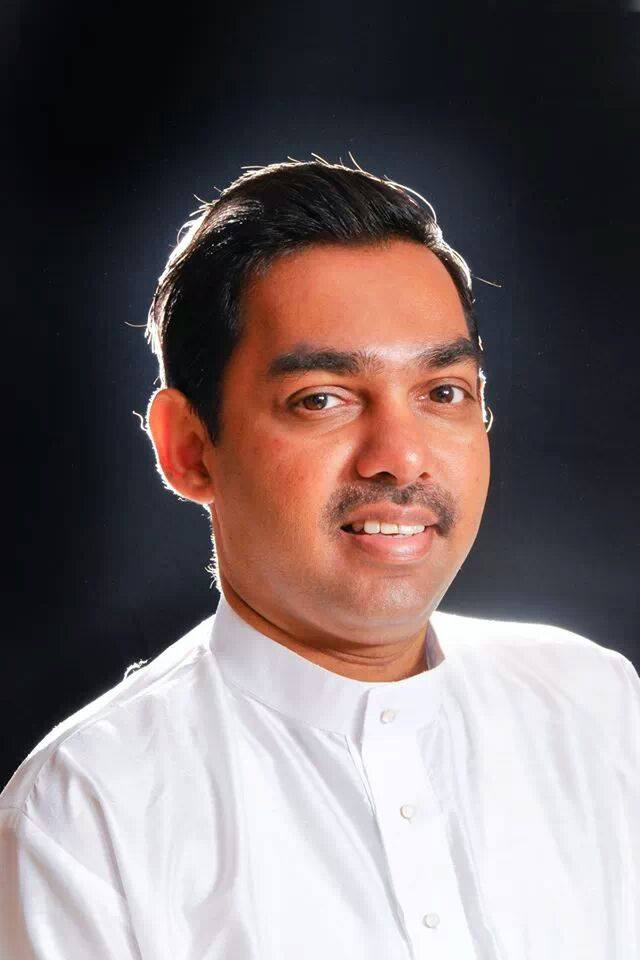

Member of Parliament for Matale
- In office 19 December 2001 – 7 February 2004

Personal details
- Born: Rasnayake Mudiyanselage Sanjeeva Bandara Kavirtne; 20 September 1969 Rattota, Sri Lanka
- Died: 16 March 2014 (aged 44) Kandy General Hospital, Kandy, Sri Lanka
- Party: United National Party
- Spouse: Rohini Kumari Wijerathna (m. 1994)
- Children: Lakna, Kanishka
- Education: St. Thomas' College, Matale, Asoka Vidyalaya, Colombo, Royal College, Colombo, Ananda College, Colombo
- Occupation: politician
- Profession: Journalist; Environmentalist

Rasnayake Mudiyanselage Sanjeeva Bandara Kaviratne (20 September 1969 – 16 March 2014) was a Sri Lankan politician who was a member of the Central Provincial Council and member of Parliament.

Sanjeewa Kaviratne was born in Rattota on 20 September 1969, the son of the former Minister of Cultural Affairs, Ratnayake Mudiyanselage Punchi Banda Kaviratne. He received his education at St. Thomas' College, Matale and then Ananda College, Colombo. He entered politics through the Central Provincial Council Election 1993. He married Rohini née Banda, the daughter of the former Minister of Agriculture, K. Y. M. Wijeratne Banda, on 27 May 1994. He emerged victorious at the 12th parliamentary elections, held on 5 December 2001, entering the Parliament of Sri Lanka representing the Matale District. He failed to get re-elected at the 2004 parliamentary elections, held on 2 April 2004, but stood and was elected back onto the Central Provincial Council at the 2004 provisional council elections held on 20 July. Kaviratne represented the Central Provincial Council as the opposition media spokesperson and the main organiser of the Dambulla Electorate, Matale.

He died at Kandy General Hospital, following a heart attack, on 16 March 2014, at the age of 44.
