= Rohitha Abeygunawardena =

Sri Lankan politician and businessman

Hon. Rohitha Abeygunawardena MP

Member of Parliament for Kalutara District
- Incumbent
- Assumed office 2001

Minister of Ports and Shipping
- In office 12 August 2020 – 18 April 2022
- Preceded by: Mahinda Samarasinghe
- Succeeded by: Pramitha Tennakoon

State Minister of Energy
- In office 27 November 2019 – 12 August 2020

Deputy Minister of Ports and Aviation
- In office 2010 – 9 January 2015

Minister of Nation Building
- In office 2007–2010

Deputy Minister of Post, Telecommunications and Udarata Development
- In office 2004–2007

Personal details
- Born: 21 September 1966 (age 59)
- Party: New Democratic Front (since 2024); Sri Lanka Podujana Peramuna (2019–2024); Sri Lanka Freedom Party (2001–2019)

Pahalage Rohitha Piyatissa Abeygunawardena (Sinhala: රෝහිත අබේගුණවර්ධන; Tamil: ரோஹித அபேகுணவர்தன) (born 21 September 1966) is a Sri Lankan politician, businessman and former cabinet minister. He is a representative of Kalutara District for the New Democratic Front in the Parliament of Sri Lanka.

== Education ==
Abeygunawardena was educated at Gnanodaya Maha Vidyalaya, Kalutara.

== Political career ==
Abeygunawardena was the driver of minister Ediriweera Premarathna, who helped Abeygunawardena kickstart his political career.

In September 2008, Abeygunawardena was questioned for allegations of undeclared assets estimated at more than Rs. 450 million. The two officers who conducted the investigation were later transferred out of the Bribery commission.

The Commission of Bribery and Corruption filed a case against Abeygunawardena on 8 January 2016 over undeclared illegally earned assets worth over Rs 41.1 million. The Director General of the Bribery Commission alleged that the minister made 66 unlawful monetary transactions, constructed a house and purchased a jeep.
