= Rohini Kumari Wijerathna =

Sri Lankan politician

Hon. Rohini Kavirathna MP
- රෝහිණි කවිරත්න ரோகிணி கவிரத்னா
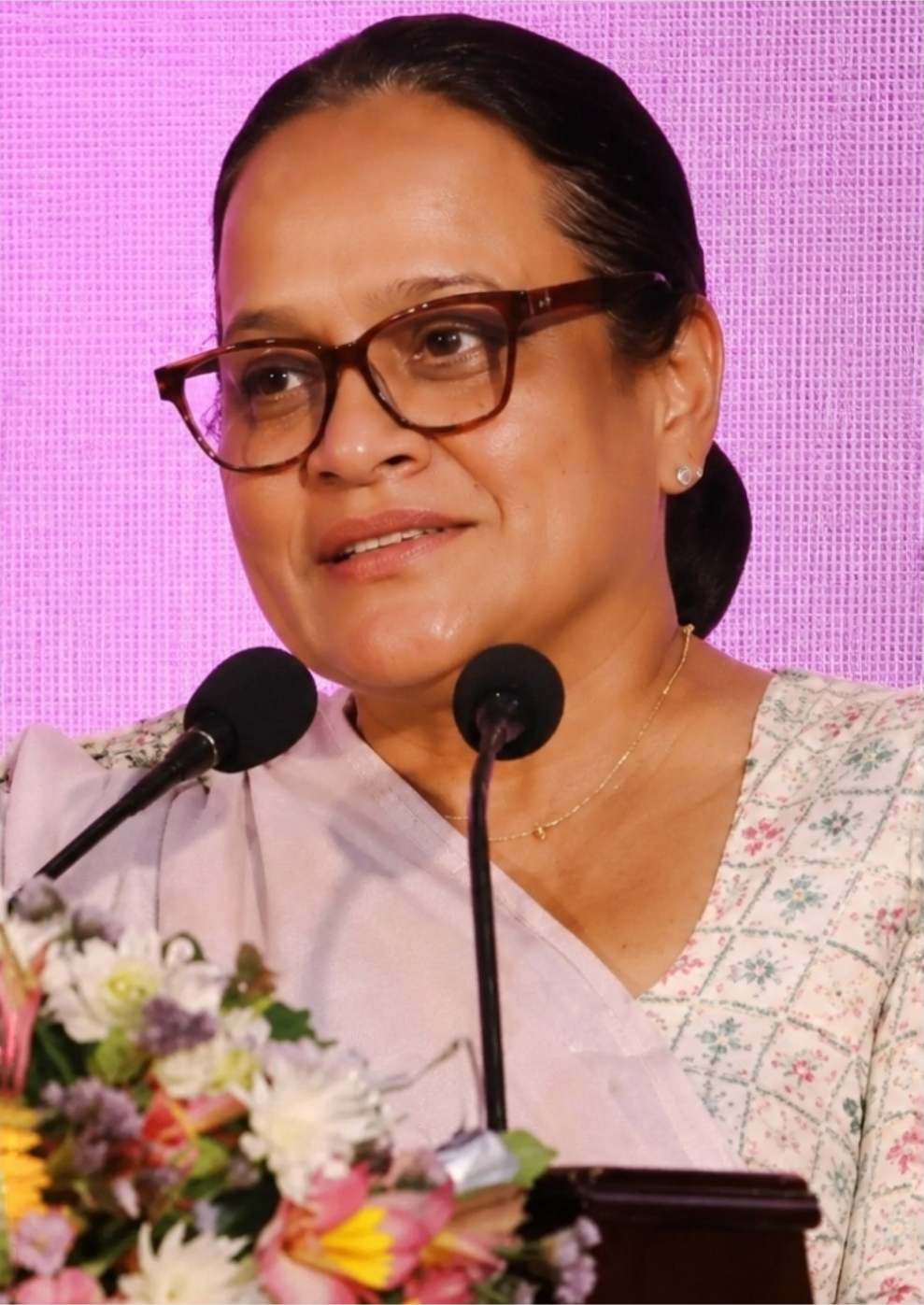
- Kavirathna in 2025

Member of Parliament for Matale District
- Incumbent
- Assumed office 1 September 2015
- Majority: 41,766 Preferential Votes

Chairperson of Samagi Vanitha Balawegaya
- Incumbent
- Assumed office 22 August 2024
- Preceded by: Thalatha Atukorale

Personal details
- Born: December 12, 1971 (age 54) Matale, Dominion of Ceylon
- Party: Samagi Jana Balawegaya (2020–present)
- Other political affiliations: United National Party (2014–2020)
- Spouse: Sanjeeva Kaviratne (m.1994, died 2014)
- Children: Lakna Kavirathna, Kanishka Kavirathna
- Occupation: Politician
- Profession: Academic

Rohini Kumari Wijeratne-Kavirathna (born December 12, 1971) is a Sri Lankan politician and academic, serving as a Member of Parliament for Matale District. She was first elected in the 2015 election as a member of the United National Party (UNP) and was re-elected in 2020 and 2024 as a representative of the Samagi Jana Balawegaya (SJB).

She is the daughter of the late J.P. Wijeratne Banda, a former Deputy Minister of Agriculture, and the widow of the late Sanjeeva Kaviratne, a former Member of Parliament and member of the Central Provincial Council. She pursued teacher training and worked as an educator before entering politics. She advocates for women's empowerment, LGBT rights, education reform, and human rights, and is recognized as one of the most active female MPs in the country.

== Early life and education ==
Rohini Kumari Wijeratne was born on December 12, 1971, in Matale, Dominion of Ceylon. She studied at Laggala Pallegama Central College, Sri Sanghamiththa Girls College, and Swarnamali Girls College in Kandy.

== Political career ==
=== United National Party ===
Rohini Kavirathna entered national politics following the death of her husband, Sanjeeva Kaviratne, in 2014. She joined the United National Party (UNP) and contested the 2015 parliamentary election from the Matale District under the United National Front for Good Governance (UNFGG). She secured a seat in Parliament, ranking 3rd in preferential votes for Matale, focusing on constituency development, women's issues, and rural education initiatives. During this period, she contributed to debates on agriculture, education, and rural development and pioneered initiatives such as the "Teacher Advisors Service" to support educators in remote areas.

=== Samagi Jana Balawegaya ===
In 2020, following internal divisions within the United National Party, Kavirathna joined the newly formed Samagi Jana Balawegaya (SJB), led by Sajith Premadasa. She was re-elected as a Member of Parliament for the Matale District under the SJB banner. She later became the SJB Chief Organizer for Matale District and was nominated by the party for Deputy Speaker in 2022, although she was not elected. During this period, she gained recognition as an advocate for women's and children's rights, governance reforms, and accountability in Parliament.

During the 2020–2024 parliamentary term, Kavirathna served on the Women Parliamentarians' Caucus, the House Committee of Parliament, and Ministerial Consultative Committees on Education, Higher Education and Vocational Education, Women and Child Affairs, and Environment.

She introduced a Private Member's Bill seeking to ban conversion therapy, supporting LGBTQ rights in Sri Lanka, and advocated for gender equality, child welfare, education reforms, scholarships, school safety, and youth development.

She was also awarded Best Female MP for her parliamentary contributions and social advocacy work.

=== Re-elected 2024–Present ===
In the 2024 Sri Lankan parliamentary election, Kavirathna was re-elected as a Member of Parliament for the Matale District with 27,945 preferential votes, the highest number among Samagi Jana Balawegaya (SJB) candidates in the district.

Following the resignation of Thalatha Atukorale as Chairperson of the Samagi Vanitha Balawegaya in 2024, Kavirathna was appointed as the new Chairperson of the SJB women's wing.

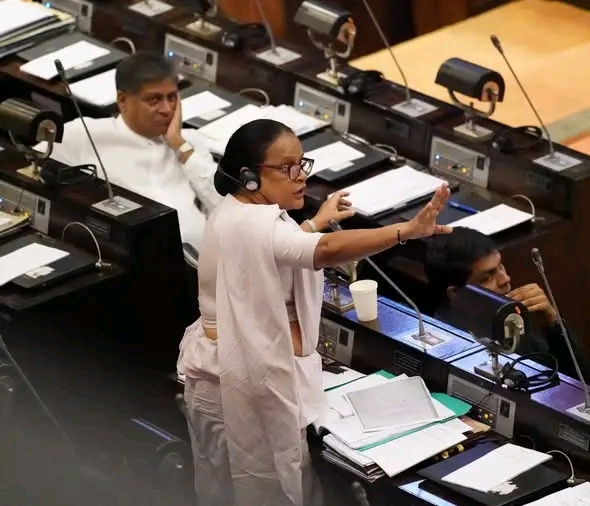
Kavirathna speaking during the parliamentary debate on the Negombo Prison unrest, 8 July 2026.

Following the SJB's electoral setbacks, Kavirathna has been mentioned alongside Harsha de Silva in discussions regarding the party's future direction.

== Deputy Speaker Election ==
In May 2022, Rohini Kavirathna was nominated by the Samagi Jana Balawegaya (SJB) as its candidate for the post of Deputy Speaker of Parliament following the resignation of Ranjith Siyambalapitiya amid the 2022 Sri Lankan political crisis.

The election was held on 17 May 2022 through a secret ballot among Members of Parliament. Kavirathna, representing the opposition, contested against the ruling party candidate Ajith Rajapakse of the Sri Lanka Podujana Peramuna (SLPP). She secured 78 votes (41.7%) out of 187, while Rajapakse received 109 votes, winning by a margin of 31.

Although unsuccessful, Kavirathna's candidacy was considered a notable effort to strengthen women's representation and accountability in Parliament during a time of political instability.

=== Results ===
Candidate	Party	Votes	%
Ajith Rajapakse	Sri Lanka Podujana Peramuna	109	58.29
Rohini Kavirathna	Samagi Jana Balawegaya	78	41.71
Total		187	100.00
Valid votes		187	89.05
Invalid/blank votes		23	10.95
Total votes		210	100.00
Registered voters/turnout		225	93.33

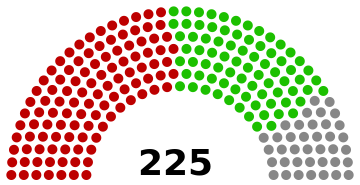

== Electoral history ==
Parliamentary Elections
Year	Constituency	Party	Alliance	Votes	%	+/−	Result
2015	Matale District	United National Party	UNF for Good Governance	41,766	30.22%	30.22	Elected
2020	Matale District	Samagi Jana Balawegaya	Samagi Jana Sandhanaya	27,587	37.30%	▲7.08	Elected
2024	Matale District	Samagi Jana Balawegaya	Samagi Jana Sandhanaya	27,945	52.53%	▲15.23	Elected

== Personal life ==
She married Sanjeeva Kaviratne on May 27, 1994, and they had two children, Lakna and Kanishka. Her husband died on March 16, 2014, at the age of 44. She resides in the Matale District and remains active in political and community affairs.

== Awards and honors ==
- Awarded Parliamentarian of the Year (Female) in 2022 for exemplary service in the Parliament of Sri Lanka.
