= Rattota Polling Division =

Rattota
- Polling Division
- Coordinates: 7.473219°N 80.652919°E
- Country: Sri Lanka
- Province: Central Province, Sri Lanka
- Electoral District: Matale Electoral District

Area
  - Total: 182.43 km^{2} (70.44 sq mi)

Population (2012)
  - Total: 119,381
  - Density: 654/km^{2} (1,690/sq mi)
- ISO 3166 code: EC-05D

The Rattota Polling Division is a Polling Division in the Matale Electoral District, in the Central Province, Sri Lanka.

== Presidential Election Results ==
=== Summary ===
7 out of 8 times the candidate that has won the elections in Rattota has also won the Presidential Elections overall. Therefore, Rattota is considered a consistent Bellwether for the Presidential Elections in Sri Lanka.

Year	Rattota	Matale Electoral District	MAE %	Sri Lanka	MAE %
2019	SLPP	SLPP	6.52%	SLPP	3.85%
2015	NDF	UPFA	5.62%	NDF	1.71%
2010	UPFA	UPFA	5.13%	UPFA	3.21%
2005	UNP	UNP	3.93%	UPFA	5.94%
1999	PA	PA	0.19%	PA	0.28%
1994	PA	PA	1.48%	PA	2.63%
1988	UNP	UNP	3.39%	UNP	9.22%
1982	UNP	UNP	4.03%	UNP	7.69%
Matches/Mean MAE	7/8	6/8	3.79%	8/8	4.32%

=== 2019 Sri Lankan Presidential Election ===
Party	Rattota		Matale Electoral District		Sri Lanka	
Party	Votes	%	Votes	%	Votes	%
SLPP	37,390	48.43%	187,821	55.37%	6,924,255	52.25%
NDF	35,774	46.34%	134,291	39.59%	5,564,239	41.99%
Other Parties (with < 1%)	2,322	3.01%	8,219	2.42%	345,452	2.61%
NMPP	1,717	2.22%	8,890	2.62%	418,553	3.16%
Valid Votes	77,203	99.13%	339,221	99.05%	13,252,499	98.99%
Rejected Votes	678	0.87%	3,252	0.95%	135,452	1.01%
Total Polled	77,881	83.29%	342,473	85.30%	13,387,951	83.71%
Registered Electors	93,503		401,496		15,992,568	

=== 2015 Sri Lankan Presidential Election ===
Party	Rattota		Matale Electoral District		Sri Lanka	
Party	Votes	%	Votes	%	Votes	%
NDF	37,319	52.70%	145,928	47.22%	6,217,162	51.28%
UPFA	32,235	45.52%	158,880	51.41%	5,768,090	47.58%
Other Parties (with < 1%)	1,258	1.78%	4,214	1.36%	138,200	1.14%
Valid Votes	70,812	98.50%	309,022	98.83%	12,123,452	98.85%
Rejected Votes	1,079	1.50%	3,653	1.17%	140,925	1.15%
Total Polled	71,891	77.06%	312,675	78.76%	12,264,377	78.69%
Registered Electors	93,296		397,005		15,585,942	

=== 2010 Sri Lankan Presidential Election ===
Party	Rattota		Matale Electoral District		Sri Lanka	
Party	Votes	%	Votes	%	Votes	%
UPFA	32,818	54.35%	157,953	59.74%	6,015,934	57.88%
NDF	25,991	43.04%	100,513	38.01%	4,173,185	40.15%
Other Parties (with < 1%)	1,579	2.61%	5,953	2.25%	204,494	1.97%
Valid Votes	60,388	98.76%	264,419	99.00%	10,393,613	99.03%
Rejected Votes	760	1.24%	2,666	1.00%	101,838	0.97%
Total Polled	61,148	73.34%	267,085	75.08%	10,495,451	66.70%
Registered Electors	83,381		355,738		15,734,587	

=== 2005 Sri Lankan Presidential Election ===
Party	Rattota		Matale Electoral District		Sri Lanka	
Party	Votes	%	Votes	%	Votes	%
UNP	31,449	54.10%	125,937	50.25%	4,706,366	48.43%
UPFA	25,551	43.96%	120,533	48.09%	4,887,152	50.29%
Other Parties (with < 1%)	1,129	1.94%	4,150	1.66%	123,521	1.27%
Valid Votes	58,129	98.38%	250,620	98.51%	9,717,039	98.88%
Rejected Votes	955	1.62%	3,785	1.49%	109,869	1.12%
Total Polled	59,084	75.45%	254,405	76.51%	9,826,908	69.51%
Registered Electors	78,314		332,515		14,136,979	

=== 1999 Sri Lankan Presidential Election ===
Party	Rattota		Matale Electoral District		Sri Lanka	
Party	Votes	%	Votes	%	Votes	%
PA	26,959	51.56%	111,232	51.42%	4,312,157	51.12%
UNP	22,336	42.72%	91,944	42.51%	3,602,748	42.71%
JVP	1,574	3.01%	7,924	3.66%	343,927	4.08%
Other Parties (with < 1%)	1,414	2.70%	5,210	2.41%	176,679	2.09%
Valid Votes	52,283	96.98%	216,310	97.23%	8,435,754	97.69%
Rejected Votes	1,627	3.02%	6,171	2.77%	199,536	2.31%
Total Polled	53,910	75.90%	222,481	76.18%	8,635,290	72.17%
Registered Electors	71,025		292,055		11,965,536	

=== 1994 Sri Lankan Presidential Election ===
Party	Rattota		Matale Electoral District		Sri Lanka	
Party	Votes	%	Votes	%	Votes	%
PA	28,300	59.36%	121,449	60.98%	4,709,205	62.28%
UNP	18,187	38.15%	73,324	36.82%	2,715,283	35.91%
Ind 2	618	1.30%	2,111	1.06%	58,888	0.78%
Other Parties (with < 1%)	573	1.20%	2,280	1.14%	78,152	1.03%
Valid Votes	47,678	96.68%	199,164	97.40%	7,561,526	98.03%
Rejected Votes	1,636	3.32%	5,317	2.60%	151,706	1.97%
Total Polled	49,314	74.45%	204,481	76.95%	7,713,232	69.12%
Registered Electors	66,238		265,743		11,158,880	

=== 1988 Sri Lankan Presidential Election ===
Party	Rattota		Matale Electoral District		Sri Lanka	
Party	Votes	%	Votes	%	Votes	%
UNP	10,599	61.27%	37,007	57.85%	2,569,199	50.43%
SLFP	6,380	36.88%	25,825	40.37%	2,289,857	44.95%
SLMP	320	1.85%	1,135	1.77%	235,701	4.63%
Valid Votes	17,299	98.31%	63,967	98.29%	5,094,754	98.24%
Rejected Votes	297	1.69%	1,110	1.71%	91,499	1.76%
Total Polled	17,596	33.53%	65,077	30.13%	5,186,256	55.87%
Registered Electors	52,472		215,999		9,283,143	

=== 1982 Sri Lankan Presidential Election ===
Party	Rattota		Matale Electoral District		Sri Lanka	
Party	Votes	%	Votes	%	Votes	%
UNP	25,183	62.06%	94,031	58.11%	3,450,815	52.93%
SLFP	12,982	31.99%	59,299	36.65%	2,546,348	39.05%
JVP	2,033	5.01%	7,169	4.43%	273,428	4.19%
Other Parties (with < 1%)	382	0.94%	1,315	0.81%	249,460	3.83%
Valid Votes	40,580	99.03%	161,814	99.13%	6,520,156	98.78%
Rejected Votes	396	0.97%	1,414	0.87%	80,470	1.22%
Total Polled	40,976	85.53%	163,228	85.97%	6,600,626	80.15%
Registered Electors	47,906		189,867		8,235,358	

== Parliamentary Election Results ==
=== Summary ===
The winner of Rattota has matched the final country result 5 out of 7 times. Hence, Rattota is a Weak Bellwether for Parliamentary Elections.

Year	Rattota	Matale Electoral District	MAE %	Sri Lanka	MAE %
2015	UNP	UNP	5.85%	UNP	6.02%
2010	UPFA	UPFA	5.01%	UPFA	2.28%
2004	UNP	UPFA	4.10%	UPFA	5.07%
2001	UNP	UNP	2.34%	UNP	4.51%
2000	PA	PA	1.69%	PA	3.57%
1994	UNP	PA	4.00%	PA	5.35%
1989	UNP	UNP	1.66%	UNP	7.83%
Matches/Mean MAE	5/7	7/7	3.52%	7/7	4.95%

=== 2015 Sri Lankan Parliamentary Election ===
Party	Rattota		Matale Electoral District		Sri Lanka	
Party	Votes	%	Votes	%	Votes	%
UNP	35,313	55.99%	138,241	49.87%	5,098,916	45.77%
UPFA	24,872	39.44%	126,315	45.57%	4,732,664	42.48%
JVP	2,419	3.84%	10,947	3.95%	544,154	4.88%
Other Parties (with < 1%)	465	0.74%	1,690	0.61%	82,293	0.74%
Valid Votes	63,069	91.24%	277,193	92.73%	11,140,333	95.35%
Rejected Votes	6,014	8.70%	21,537	7.21%	516,926	4.42%
Total Polled	69,124	74.09%	298,917	78.73%	11,684,111	77.66%
Registered Electors	93,296		379,675		15,044,490	

=== 2010 Sri Lankan Parliamentary Election ===
Party	Rattota		Matale Electoral District		Sri Lanka	
Party	Votes	%	Votes	%	Votes	%
UPFA	26,818	61.82%	131,069	67.02%	4,846,388	60.38%
UNP	14,666	33.81%	55,737	28.50%	2,357,057	29.37%
DNA	1,574	3.63%	7,636	3.90%	441,251	5.50%
Other Parties (with < 1%)	323	0.74%	1,122	0.57%	34,715	0.43%
Valid Votes	43,381	88.55%	195,564	90.93%	8,026,322	96.03%
Rejected Votes	5,567	11.36%	19,310	8.98%	581,465	6.96%
Total Polled	48,992	58.76%	215,060	60.23%	8,358,246	59.29%
Registered Electors	83,381		357,063		14,097,690	

=== 2004 Sri Lankan Parliamentary Election ===
Party	Rattota		Matale Electoral District		Sri Lanka	
Party	Votes	%	Votes	%	Votes	%
UNP	25,330	49.25%	100,642	45.73%	3,486,792	37.73%
UPFA	22,747	44.23%	108,259	49.19%	4,223,126	45.70%
JHU	2,611	5.08%	8,819	4.01%	552,723	5.98%
Other Parties (with < 1%)	741	1.44%	2,342	1.06%	54,554	0.59%
Valid Votes	51,429	91.21%	220,062	91.84%	9,241,931	94.52%
Rejected Votes	4,959	8.79%	19,549	8.16%	534,452	5.47%
Total Polled	56,388	73.67%	239,611	76.66%	9,777,821	75.74%
Registered Electors	76,544		312,556		12,909,631	

=== 2001 Sri Lankan Parliamentary Election ===
Party	Rattota		Matale Electoral District		Sri Lanka	
Party	Votes	%	Votes	%	Votes	%
UNP	28,088	53.42%	109,991	50.43%	4,086,026	45.62%
PA	20,506	39.00%	88,999	40.81%	3,330,815	37.19%
JVP	3,179	6.05%	16,063	7.37%	815,353	9.10%
Other Parties (with < 1%)	805	1.53%	3,037	1.39%	62,170	0.69%
Valid Votes	52,578	92.52%	218,090	93.38%	8,955,844	94.77%
Rejected Votes	4,253	7.48%	15,449	6.62%	494,009	5.23%
Total Polled	56,831	76.77%	233,539	77.95%	9,449,878	76.03%
Registered Electors	74,026		299,606		12,428,762	

=== 2000 Sri Lankan Parliamentary Election ===
Party	Rattota		Matale Electoral District		Sri Lanka	
Party	Votes	%	Votes	%	Votes	%
PA	27,615	52.52%	110,213	50.53%	3,899,329	45.33%
UNP	21,331	40.57%	91,836	42.11%	3,451,765	40.12%
JVP	2,138	4.07%	10,673	4.89%	518,725	6.03%
Other Parties (with < 1%)	838	1.59%	3,025	1.39%	182,723	2.12%
NLF	660	1.26%	2,350	1.08%	32,275	0.38%
Valid Votes	52,582	N/A	218,097	N/A	8,602,617	N/A

=== 1994 Sri Lankan Parliamentary Election ===
Party	Rattota		Matale Electoral District		Sri Lanka	
Party	Votes	%	Votes	%	Votes	%
UNP	26,283	52.78%	100,121	48.61%	3,498,370	44.04%
PA	22,856	45.90%	102,680	49.85%	3,887,805	48.94%
Other Parties (with < 1%)	656	1.32%	3,161	1.53%	138,277	1.74%
Valid Votes	49,795	93.62%	205,962	94.22%	7,943,688	95.20%
Rejected Votes	3,393	6.38%	12,646	5.78%	400,395	4.80%
Total Polled	53,188	80.30%	218,608	81.88%	8,344,095	74.75%
Registered Electors	66,238		266,974		11,163,064	

=== 1989 Sri Lankan Parliamentary Election ===
Party	Rattota		Matale Electoral District		Sri Lanka	
Party	Votes	%	Votes	%	Votes	%
UNP	22,019	65.02%	88,869	63.81%	2,838,005	50.71%
SLFP	10,225	30.19%	45,717	32.82%	1,785,369	31.90%
ELJP	912	2.69%	2,350	1.69%	67,723	1.21%
USA	710	2.10%	2,344	1.68%	141,983	2.54%
Valid Votes	33,866	91.67%	139,280	92.11%	5,596,468	93.87%
Rejected Votes	3,079	8.33%	11,927	7.89%	365,563	6.13%
Total Polled	36,945	71.80%	151,207	70.35%	5,962,031	63.60%
Registered Electors	51,452		214,938		9,374,164	

== Demographics ==
=== Ethnicity ===
The Rattota Polling Division has a Sinhalese majority (67.9%), a significant Moor population (13.4%) and a significant Indian Tamil population (12.6%) . In comparison, the Matale Electoral District (which contains the Rattota Polling Division) has a Sinhalese majority (80.8%)

Ethnicity in Rattota
1. Sinhalese (67.9%)
2. Moor (13.4%)
3. Indian Tamil (12.6%)
4. Sri Lankan Tamil (5.90%)
5. Other (0.30%)

=== Religion ===
The Rattota Polling Division has a Buddhist majority (67.3%), a significant Hindu population (17.1%) and a significant Muslim population (13.6%) . In comparison, the Matale Electoral District (which contains the Rattota Polling Division) has a Buddhist majority (79.5%)

Religion in Rattota
1. Buddhist (67.3%)
2. Hindu (17.1%)
3. Muslim (13.6%)
4. Roman Catholic (1.20%)
5. Other (0.70%)
