= Dinesh Perera =

Sri Lankan politician

Hon. Dinesh Hemantha Perera MP

Member of Parliament for Matale Electoral District
- Incumbent
- Assumed office 15 November 2024

Personal details
- Party: National People's Power
- Profession: Politician

Dinesh Hemantha Perera is a Sri Lankan politician. He was elected to the Sri Lankan Parliament from Matale Electoral District as a member of the National People's Power.
