= Laggala Polling Division =

Laggala
- Polling Division
- Coordinates: 7.611125°N 80.787205°E
- Country: Sri Lanka
- Province: Central Province, Sri Lanka
- Electoral District: Matale Electoral District

Area
  - Total: 986.7 km^{2} (381.0 sq mi)

Population (2012)
  - Total: 88,131
  - Density: 89/km^{2} (230/sq mi)

The Laggala Polling Division is a Polling Division in the Matale Electoral District, in the Central Province, Sri Lanka.

== Presidential Election Results ==
=== Summary ===
The winner of Laggala has matched the final country result 7 out of 8 times, indicating that the division is a strong bellwether for presidential elections.

Year	Laggala	Matale Electoral District	MAE %	Sri Lanka	MAE %
2019	SLPP	SLPP	4.36%	SLPP	6.97%
2015	UPFA	UPFA	8.74%	NDF	12.67%
2010	UPFA	UPFA	4.36%	UPFA	6.31%
2005	UPFA	UNP	2.52%	UPFA	0.54%
1999	PA	PA	4.80%	PA	5.06%
1994	PA	PA	4.16%	PA	3.05%
1988	UNP	UNP	8.15%	UNP	2.29%
1982	UNP	UNP	2.14%	UNP	1.92%
Matches/Mean MAE	7/8	6/8	4.90%	8/8	4.85%

=== 2019 Sri Lankan Presidential Election ===
Party	Laggala		Matale Electoral District		Sri Lanka	
Party	Votes	%	Votes	%	Votes	%
SLPP	36,363	60.23%	187,821	55.37%	6,924,255	52.25%
NDF	21,384	35.42%	134,291	39.59%	5,564,239	41.99%
Other Parties (with < 1%)	1,561	2.59%	8,219	2.42%	345,452	2.61%
NMPP	1,070	1.77%	8,890	2.62%	418,553	3.16%
Valid Votes	60,378	99.18%	339,221	99.05%	13,252,499	98.99%
Rejected Votes	501	0.82%	3,252	0.95%	135,452	1.01%
Total Polled	60,879	87.43%	342,473	85.30%	13,387,951	83.71%
Registered Electors	69,632		401,496		15,992,568	

=== 2015 Sri Lankan Presidential Election ===
Party	Laggala		Matale Electoral District		Sri Lanka	
Party	Votes	%	Votes	%	Votes	%
UPFA	33,821	60.20%	158,880	51.41%	5,768,090	47.58%
NDF	21,511	38.29%	145,928	47.22%	6,217,162	51.28%
Other Parties (with < 1%)	846	1.51%	4,214	1.36%	138,200	1.14%
Valid Votes	56,178	98.98%	309,022	98.83%	12,123,452	98.85%
Rejected Votes	581	1.02%	3,653	1.17%	140,925	1.15%
Total Polled	56,759	80.71%	312,675	78.76%	12,264,377	78.69%
Registered Electors	70,323		397,005		15,585,942	

=== 2010 Sri Lankan Presidential Election ===
Party	Laggala		Matale Electoral District		Sri Lanka	
Party	Votes	%	Votes	%	Votes	%
UPFA	31,277	64.09%	157,953	59.74%	6,015,934	57.88%
NDF	16,300	33.40%	100,513	38.01%	4,173,185	40.15%
Other Parties (with < 1%)	1,221	2.50%	5,953	2.25%	204,494	1.97%
Valid Votes	48,798	99.27%	264,419	99.00%	10,393,613	99.03%
Rejected Votes	361	0.73%	2,666	1.00%	101,838	0.97%
Total Polled	49,159	75.98%	267,085	75.08%	10,495,451	66.70%
Registered Electors	64,696		355,738		15,734,587	

=== 2005 Sri Lankan Presidential Election ===
Party	Laggala		Matale Electoral District		Sri Lanka	
Party	Votes	%	Votes	%	Votes	%
UPFA	23,637	50.53%	120,533	48.09%	4,887,152	50.29%
UNP	22,249	47.56%	125,937	50.25%	4,706,366	48.43%
Other Parties (with < 1%)	895	1.91%	4,150	1.66%	123,521	1.27%
Valid Votes	46,781	98.57%	250,620	98.51%	9,717,039	98.88%
Rejected Votes	679	1.43%	3,785	1.49%	109,869	1.12%
Total Polled	47,460	77.82%	254,405	76.51%	9,826,908	69.51%
Registered Electors	60,990		332,515		14,136,979	

=== 1999 Sri Lankan Presidential Election ===
Party	Laggala		Matale Electoral District		Sri Lanka	
Party	Votes	%	Votes	%	Votes	%
PA	24,073	57.07%	111,232	51.42%	4,312,157	51.12%
UNP	16,091	38.15%	91,944	42.51%	3,602,748	42.71%
JVP	1,069	2.53%	7,924	3.66%	343,927	4.08%
Other Parties (with < 1%)	946	2.24%	5,210	2.41%	176,679	2.09%
Valid Votes	42,179	97.43%	216,310	97.23%	8,435,754	97.69%
Rejected Votes	1,112	2.57%	6,171	2.77%	199,536	2.31%
Total Polled	43,291	80.57%	222,481	76.18%	8,635,290	72.17%
Registered Electors	53,732		292,055		11,965,536	

=== 1994 Sri Lankan Presidential Election ===
Party	Laggala		Matale Electoral District		Sri Lanka	
Party	Votes	%	Votes	%	Votes	%
PA	26,092	65.21%	121,449	60.98%	4,709,205	62.28%
UNP	13,013	32.52%	73,324	36.82%	2,715,283	35.91%
Ind 2	507	1.27%	2,111	1.06%	58,888	0.78%
Other Parties (with < 1%)	399	1.00%	2,280	1.14%	78,152	1.03%
Valid Votes	40,011	97.81%	199,164	97.40%	7,561,526	98.03%
Rejected Votes	897	2.19%	5,317	2.60%	151,706	1.97%
Total Polled	40,908	84.30%	204,481	76.95%	7,713,232	69.12%
Registered Electors	48,525		265,743		11,158,880	

=== 1988 Sri Lankan Presidential Election ===
Party	Laggala		Matale Electoral District		Sri Lanka	
Party	Votes	%	Votes	%	Votes	%
UNP	9,055	49.81%	37,007	57.85%	2,569,199	50.43%
SLFP	8,908	49.00%	25,825	40.37%	2,289,857	44.95%
SLMP	216	1.19%	1,135	1.77%	235,701	4.63%
Valid Votes	18,179	98.92%	63,967	98.29%	5,094,754	98.24%
Rejected Votes	198	1.08%	1,110	1.71%	91,499	1.76%
Total Polled	18,377	44.70%	65,077	30.13%	5,186,256	55.87%
Registered Electors	41,110		215,999		9,283,143	

=== 1982 Sri Lankan Presidential Election ===
Party	Laggala		Matale Electoral District		Sri Lanka	
Party	Votes	%	Votes	%	Votes	%
UNP	17,354	56.18%	94,031	58.11%	3,450,815	52.93%
SLFP	12,149	39.33%	59,299	36.65%	2,546,348	39.05%
JVP	1,158	3.75%	7,169	4.43%	273,428	4.19%
Other Parties (with < 1%)	228	0.74%	1,315	0.81%	249,460	3.83%
Valid Votes	30,889	99.13%	161,814	99.13%	6,520,156	98.78%
Rejected Votes	272	0.87%	1,414	0.87%	80,470	1.22%
Total Polled	31,161	88.70%	163,228	85.97%	6,600,626	80.15%
Registered Electors	35,129		189,867		8,235,358	

== Parliamentary Election Results ==
=== Summary ===
The winner of Laggala has matched the final country result 5 out of 7 times. Hence, Laggala is a Weak Bellwether for Parliamentary Elections.

Year	Laggala	Matale Electoral District	MAE %	Sri Lanka	MAE %
2015	UPFA	UNP	7.78%	UNP	6.70%
2010	UPFA	UPFA	6.90%	UPFA	10.82%
2004	UPFA	UPFA	1.43%	UPFA	6.13%
2001	PA	UNP	9.98%	UNP	8.42%
2000	PA	PA	6.23%	PA	7.40%
1994	PA	PA	2.76%	PA	2.62%
1989	UNP	UNP	7.61%	UNP	12.81%
Matches/Mean MAE	5/7	7/7	6.10%	7/7	7.84%

=== 2015 Sri Lankan Parliamentary Election ===
Party	Laggala		Matale Electoral District		Sri Lanka	
Party	Votes	%	Votes	%	Votes	%
UPFA	26,748	54.40%	126,315	45.57%	4,732,664	42.48%
UNP	20,867	42.44%	138,241	49.87%	5,098,916	45.77%
JVP	1,324	2.69%	10,947	3.95%	544,154	4.88%
Other Parties (with < 1%)	233	0.47%	1,690	0.61%	82,293	0.74%
Valid Votes	49,172	91.90%	277,193	92.73%	11,140,333	95.35%
Rejected Votes	4,292	8.02%	21,537	7.21%	516,926	4.42%
Total Polled	53,504	76.08%	298,917	78.73%	11,684,111	77.66%
Registered Electors	70,323		379,675		15,044,490	

=== 2010 Sri Lankan Parliamentary Election ===
Party	Laggala		Matale Electoral District		Sri Lanka	
Party	Votes	%	Votes	%	Votes	%
UPFA	27,777	74.79%	131,069	67.02%	4,846,388	60.38%
UNP	8,478	22.83%	55,737	28.50%	2,357,057	29.37%
DNA	688	1.85%	7,636	3.90%	441,251	5.50%
Other Parties (with < 1%)	198	0.53%	1,122	0.57%	34,715	0.43%
Valid Votes	37,141	91.89%	195,564	90.93%	8,026,322	96.03%
Rejected Votes	3,217	7.96%	19,310	8.98%	581,465	6.96%
Total Polled	40,421	62.48%	215,060	60.23%	8,358,246	59.29%
Registered Electors	64,696		357,063		14,097,690	

=== 2004 Sri Lankan Parliamentary Election ===
Party	Laggala		Matale Electoral District		Sri Lanka	
Party	Votes	%	Votes	%	Votes	%
UPFA	21,307	51.88%	108,259	49.19%	4,223,126	45.70%
UNP	18,784	45.74%	100,642	45.73%	3,486,792	37.73%
JHU	579	1.41%	8,819	4.01%	552,723	5.98%
Other Parties (with < 1%)	396	0.96%	2,342	1.06%	54,554	0.59%
Valid Votes	41,066	91.94%	220,062	91.84%	9,241,931	94.52%
Rejected Votes	3,598	8.06%	19,549	8.16%	534,452	5.47%
Total Polled	44,664	75.96%	239,611	76.66%	9,777,821	75.74%
Registered Electors	58,799		312,556		12,909,631	

=== 2001 Sri Lankan Parliamentary Election ===
Party	Laggala		Matale Electoral District		Sri Lanka	
Party	Votes	%	Votes	%	Votes	%
PA	20,938	52.61%	88,999	40.81%	3,330,815	37.19%
UNP	16,117	40.49%	109,991	50.43%	4,086,026	45.62%
JVP	2,133	5.36%	16,063	7.37%	815,353	9.10%
NLF	402	1.01%	1,824	0.84%	45,901	0.51%
Other Parties (with < 1%)	211	0.53%	1,213	0.56%	16,269	0.18%
Valid Votes	39,801	93.56%	218,090	93.38%	8,955,844	94.77%
Rejected Votes	2,740	6.44%	15,449	6.62%	494,009	5.23%
Total Polled	42,541	75.64%	233,539	77.95%	9,449,878	76.03%
Registered Electors	56,244		299,606		12,428,762	

=== 2000 Sri Lankan Parliamentary Election ===
Party	Laggala		Matale Electoral District		Sri Lanka	
Party	Votes	%	Votes	%	Votes	%
PA	23,692	58.17%	110,213	50.53%	3,899,329	45.33%
UNP	14,941	36.68%	91,836	42.11%	3,451,765	40.12%
JVP	1,283	3.15%	10,673	4.89%	518,725	6.03%
NLF	460	1.13%	2,350	1.08%	32,275	0.38%
Other Parties (with < 1%)	352	0.86%	3,025	1.39%	182,723	2.12%
Valid Votes	40,728	N/A	218,097	N/A	8,602,617	N/A

=== 1994 Sri Lankan Parliamentary Election ===
Party	Laggala		Matale Electoral District		Sri Lanka	
Party	Votes	%	Votes	%	Votes	%
PA	20,648	52.66%	102,680	49.85%	3,887,805	48.94%
UNP	17,970	45.83%	100,121	48.61%	3,498,370	44.04%
IND1	437	1.11%	1,728	0.84%	48,199	0.61%
Other Parties (with < 1%)	153	0.39%	1,433	0.70%	90,078	1.13%
Valid Votes	39,208	93.74%	205,962	94.22%	7,943,688	95.20%
Rejected Votes	2,618	6.26%	12,646	5.78%	400,395	4.80%
Total Polled	41,826	86.19%	218,608	81.88%	8,344,095	74.75%
Registered Electors	48,525		266,974		11,163,064	

=== 1989 Sri Lankan Parliamentary Election ===
Party	Laggala		Matale Electoral District		Sri Lanka	
Party	Votes	%	Votes	%	Votes	%
UNP	19,839	72.17%	88,869	63.81%	2,838,005	50.71%
SLFP	7,143	25.98%	45,717	32.82%	1,785,369	31.90%
USA	350	1.27%	2,344	1.68%	141,983	2.54%
Other Parties (with < 1%)	157	0.57%	2,350	1.69%	67,723	1.21%
Valid Votes	27,489	91.81%	139,280	92.11%	5,596,468	93.87%
Rejected Votes	2,453	8.19%	11,927	7.89%	365,563	6.13%
Total Polled	29,942	73.65%	151,207	70.35%	5,962,031	63.60%
Registered Electors	40,656		214,938		9,374,164	

== Demographics ==
=== Ethnicity ===
The Laggala Polling Division has a Sinhalese majority (93.2%) . In comparison, the Matale Electoral District (which contains the Laggala Polling Division) has a Sinhalese majority (80.8%)

Ethnicity in Laggala
1. Sinhalese (93.2%)
2. Indian Tamil (4.00%)
3. Sri Lankan Tamil (2.20%)
4. Other (0.50%)

=== Religion ===
The Laggala Polling Division has a Buddhist majority (92.9%) . In comparison, the Matale Electoral District (which contains the Laggala Polling Division) has a Buddhist majority (79.5%)

Religion in Laggala
1. Buddhist (92.9%)
2. Hindu (5.90%)
3. Other (1.20%)
