= Rohana Dissanayake =

Sri Lankan politician

Hon. Rohana Dissanayake MP
- රෝහණ දිසානායක ரோஹன திஸாநாயக்க

Deputy Minister of Samurdhi & Poverty Alleviation
- In office 2004–2007

Non-Cabinet Minister of Urban Development
- In office 2007–2010

Deputy Minister of Transport
- In office 2010 – 12 January 2015

Member of Parliament for Matale District
- In office 2004 – 26 June 2015

Personal details
- Born: 9 March 1958 (age 68)
- Party: Sri Lanka Freedom Party
- Other political affiliations: United People's Freedom Alliance

Disanayake Mudiyanselage Rohana Kumara Dissanayake is a Sri Lankan politician, a member of the Parliament of Sri Lanka and a government minister.
