= Dambulla Polling Division =

Dambulla
- Polling Division
- Coordinates: 7.776091°N 80.639443°E
- Country: Sri Lanka
- Province: Central Province, Sri Lanka
- Electoral District: Matale Electoral District

Area
  - Total: 730.76 km^{2} (282.15 sq mi)

Population (2012)
  - Total: 171,913
  - Density: 235/km^{2} (610/sq mi)
- ISO 3166 code: EC-05A

The Dambulla Polling Division is a Polling Division in the Matale Electoral District, in the Central Province, Sri Lanka.

== Presidential Election Results ==
=== Summary ===
The winner of Dambulla has matched the final country result 7 out of 8 times. Hence, Dambulla is a Strong Bellwether for Presidential Elections.

Year	Dambulla	Matale Electoral District	MAE %	Sri Lanka	MAE %
2019	SLPP	SLPP	5.47%	SLPP	8.07%
2015	UPFA	UPFA	5.23%	NDF	9.14%
2010	UPFA	UPFA	6.00%	UPFA	7.94%
2005	UPFA	UNP	4.09%	UPFA	2.12%
1999	PA	PA	1.03%	PA	0.78%
1994	PA	PA	0.82%	PA	1.96%
1988	UNP	UNP	1.61%	UNP	4.37%
1982	UNP	UNP	5.10%	UNP	1.34%
Matches/Mean MAE	7/8	6/8	3.67%	8/8	4.46%

=== 2019 Sri Lankan Presidential Election ===
Party	Dambulla		Matale Electoral District		Sri Lanka	
Party	Votes	%	Votes	%	Votes	%
SLPP	68,177	61.11%	187,821	55.37%	6,924,255	52.25%
NDF	37,717	33.81%	134,291	39.59%	5,564,239	41.99%
NMPP	3,221	2.89%	8,890	2.62%	418,553	3.16%
Other Parties (with < 1%)	2,457	2.20%	8,219	2.42%	345,452	2.61%
Valid Votes	111,572	99.11%	339,221	99.05%	13,252,499	98.99%
Rejected Votes	1,000	0.89%	3,252	0.95%	135,452	1.01%
Total Polled	112,572	85.14%	342,473	85.30%	13,387,951	83.71%
Registered Electors	132,221		401,496		15,992,568	

=== 2015 Sri Lankan Presidential Election ===
Party	Dambulla		Matale Electoral District		Sri Lanka	
Party	Votes	%	Votes	%	Votes	%
UPFA	57,657	56.82%	158,880	51.41%	5,768,090	47.58%
NDF	42,652	42.03%	145,928	47.22%	6,217,162	51.28%
Other Parties (with < 1%)	1,163	1.15%	4,214	1.36%	138,200	1.14%
Valid Votes	101,472	98.95%	309,022	98.83%	12,123,452	98.85%
Rejected Votes	1,074	1.05%	3,653	1.17%	140,925	1.15%
Total Polled	102,546	77.79%	312,675	78.76%	12,264,377	78.69%
Registered Electors	131,831		397,005		15,585,942	

=== 2010 Sri Lankan Presidential Election ===
Party	Dambulla		Matale Electoral District		Sri Lanka	
Party	Votes	%	Votes	%	Votes	%
UPFA	58,016	65.97%	157,953	59.74%	6,015,934	57.88%
NDF	28,171	32.03%	100,513	38.01%	4,173,185	40.15%
Other Parties (with < 1%)	1,762	2.00%	5,953	2.25%	204,494	1.97%
Valid Votes	87,949	99.12%	264,419	99.00%	10,393,613	99.03%
Rejected Votes	778	0.88%	2,666	1.00%	101,838	0.97%
Total Polled	88,727	74.28%	267,085	75.08%	10,495,451	66.70%
Registered Electors	119,453		355,738		15,734,587	

=== 2005 Sri Lankan Presidential Election ===
Party	Dambulla		Matale Electoral District		Sri Lanka	
Party	Votes	%	Votes	%	Votes	%
UPFA	43,853	52.34%	120,533	48.09%	4,887,152	50.29%
UNP	38,692	46.18%	125,937	50.25%	4,706,366	48.43%
Other Parties (with < 1%)	1,233	1.47%	4,150	1.66%	123,521	1.27%
Valid Votes	83,778	98.74%	250,620	98.51%	9,717,039	98.88%
Rejected Votes	1,073	1.26%	3,785	1.49%	109,869	1.12%
Total Polled	84,851	76.17%	254,405	76.51%	9,826,908	69.51%
Registered Electors	111,401		332,515		14,136,979	

=== 1999 Sri Lankan Presidential Election ===
Party	Dambulla		Matale Electoral District		Sri Lanka	
Party	Votes	%	Votes	%	Votes	%
PA	35,811	49.90%	111,232	51.42%	4,312,157	51.12%
UNP	30,850	42.99%	91,944	42.51%	3,602,748	42.71%
JVP	3,496	4.87%	7,924	3.66%	343,927	4.08%
Other Parties (with < 1%)	1,611	2.24%	5,210	2.41%	176,679	2.09%
Valid Votes	71,768	97.45%	216,310	97.23%	8,435,754	97.69%
Rejected Votes	1,876	2.55%	6,171	2.77%	199,536	2.31%
Total Polled	73,644	75.65%	222,481	76.18%	8,635,290	72.17%
Registered Electors	97,348		292,055		11,965,536	

=== 1994 Sri Lankan Presidential Election ===
Party	Dambulla		Matale Electoral District		Sri Lanka	
Party	Votes	%	Votes	%	Votes	%
PA	37,869	60.20%	121,449	60.98%	4,709,205	62.28%
UNP	23,746	37.75%	73,324	36.82%	2,715,283	35.91%
Other Parties (with < 1%)	1,291	2.05%	4,391	2.20%	137,040	1.81%
Valid Votes	62,906	97.73%	199,164	97.40%	7,561,526	98.03%
Rejected Votes	1,458	2.27%	5,317	2.60%	151,706	1.97%
Total Polled	64,364	74.96%	204,481	76.95%	7,713,232	69.12%
Registered Electors	85,870		265,743		11,158,880	

=== 1988 Sri Lankan Presidential Election ===
Party	Dambulla		Matale Electoral District		Sri Lanka	
Party	Votes	%	Votes	%	Votes	%
UNP	4,276	56.20%	37,007	57.85%	2,569,199	50.43%
SLFP	3,195	42.00%	25,825	40.37%	2,289,857	44.95%
SLMP	137	1.80%	1,135	1.77%	235,701	4.63%
Valid Votes	7,608	98.68%	63,967	98.29%	5,094,754	98.24%
Rejected Votes	102	1.32%	1,110	1.71%	91,499	1.76%
Total Polled	7,710	10.63%	65,077	30.13%	5,186,256	55.87%
Registered Electors	72,515		215,999		9,283,143	

=== 1982 Sri Lankan Presidential Election ===
Party	Dambulla		Matale Electoral District		Sri Lanka	
Party	Votes	%	Votes	%	Votes	%
UNP	27,368	52.62%	94,031	58.11%	3,450,815	52.93%
SLFP	21,748	41.81%	59,299	36.65%	2,546,348	39.05%
JVP	2,501	4.81%	7,169	4.43%	273,428	4.19%
Other Parties (with < 1%)	395	0.76%	1,315	0.81%	249,460	3.83%
Valid Votes	52,012	99.27%	161,814	99.13%	6,520,156	98.78%
Rejected Votes	385	0.73%	1,414	0.87%	80,470	1.22%
Total Polled	52,397	86.56%	163,228	85.97%	6,600,626	80.15%
Registered Electors	60,536		189,867		8,235,358	

== Parliamentary Election Results ==
=== Summary ===
The winner of Dambulla has matched the final country result 6 out of 7 times. Hence, Dambulla is a strong Bellwether for Parliamentary Elections.

Year	Dambulla	Matale Electoral District	MAE %	Sri Lanka	MAE %
2015	UPFA	UNP	4.80%	UNP	3.91%
2010	UPFA	UPFA	3.35%	UPFA	7.46%
2004	UPFA	UPFA	5.73%	UPFA	5.92%
2001	UNP	UNP	1.63%	UNP	2.45%
2000	PA	PA	0.79%	PA	2.78%
1994	PA	PA	2.24%	PA	2.45%
1989	UNP	UNP	9.83%	UNP	5.19%
Matches/Mean MAE	6/7	7/7	4.05%	7/7	4.31%

=== 2015 Sri Lankan Parliamentary Election ===
Party	Dambulla		Matale Electoral District		Sri Lanka	
Party	Votes	%	Votes	%	Votes	%
UPFA	45,550	50.64%	126,315	45.57%	4,732,664	42.48%
UNP	40,378	44.89%	138,241	49.87%	5,098,916	45.77%
JVP	3,562	3.96%	10,947	3.95%	544,154	4.88%
Other Parties (with < 1%)	467	0.52%	1,690	0.61%	82,293	0.74%
Valid Votes	89,957	93.04%	277,193	92.73%	11,140,333	95.35%
Rejected Votes	6,671	6.90%	21,537	7.21%	516,926	4.42%
Total Polled	96,686	73.34%	298,917	78.73%	11,684,111	77.66%
Registered Electors	131,831		379,675		15,044,490	

=== 2010 Sri Lankan Parliamentary Election ===
Party	Dambulla		Matale Electoral District		Sri Lanka	
Party	Votes	%	Votes	%	Votes	%
UPFA	42,847	70.40%	131,069	67.02%	4,846,388	60.38%
UNP	15,080	24.78%	55,737	28.50%	2,357,057	29.37%
DNA	2,645	4.35%	7,636	3.90%	441,251	5.50%
Other Parties (with < 1%)	286	0.47%	1,122	0.57%	34,715	0.43%
Valid Votes	60,858	91.06%	195,564	90.93%	8,026,322	96.03%
Rejected Votes	5,932	8.88%	19,310	8.98%	581,465	6.96%
Total Polled	66,830	55.95%	215,060	60.23%	8,358,246	59.29%
Registered Electors	119,453		357,063		14,097,690	

=== 2004 Sri Lankan Parliamentary Election ===
Party	Dambulla		Matale Electoral District		Sri Lanka	
Party	Votes	%	Votes	%	Votes	%
UPFA	40,616	55.90%	108,259	49.19%	4,223,126	45.70%
UNP	29,456	40.54%	100,642	45.73%	3,486,792	37.73%
JHU	1,982	2.73%	8,819	4.01%	552,723	5.98%
Other Parties (with < 1%)	606	0.83%	2,342	1.06%	54,554	0.59%
Valid Votes	72,660	91.32%	220,062	91.84%	9,241,931	94.52%
Rejected Votes	6,905	8.68%	19,549	8.16%	534,452	5.47%
Total Polled	79,565	74.12%	239,611	76.66%	9,777,821	75.74%
Registered Electors	107,353		312,556		12,909,631	

=== 2001 Sri Lankan Parliamentary Election ===
Party	Dambulla		Matale Electoral District		Sri Lanka	
Party	Votes	%	Votes	%	Votes	%
UNP	34,066	47.73%	109,991	50.43%	4,086,026	45.62%
PA	29,281	41.03%	88,999	40.81%	3,330,815	37.19%
JVP	6,958	9.75%	16,063	7.37%	815,353	9.10%
Other Parties (with < 1%)	1,064	1.49%	3,037	1.39%	62,170	0.69%
Valid Votes	71,369	93.18%	218,090	93.38%	8,955,844	94.77%
Rejected Votes	5,225	6.82%	15,449	6.62%	494,009	5.23%
Total Polled	76,594	74.87%	233,539	77.95%	9,449,878	76.03%
Registered Electors	102,302		299,606		12,428,762	

=== 2000 Sri Lankan Parliamentary Election ===
Party	Dambulla		Matale Electoral District		Sri Lanka	
Party	Votes	%	Votes	%	Votes	%
PA	35,421	49.36%	110,213	50.53%	3,899,329	45.33%
UNP	30,455	42.44%	91,836	42.11%	3,451,765	40.12%
JVP	4,396	6.13%	10,673	4.89%	518,725	6.03%
NLF	778	1.08%	2,350	1.08%	32,275	0.38%
Other Parties (with < 1%)	706	0.98%	3,025	1.39%	182,723	2.12%
Valid Votes	71,756	N/A	218,097	N/A	8,602,617	N/A

=== 1994 Sri Lankan Parliamentary Election ===
Party	Dambulla		Matale Electoral District		Sri Lanka	
Party	Votes	%	Votes	%	Votes	%
PA	34,286	51.99%	102,680	49.85%	3,887,805	48.94%
UNP	30,468	46.20%	100,121	48.61%	3,498,370	44.04%
Other Parties (with < 1%)	1,197	1.81%	3,161	1.53%	138,277	1.74%
Valid Votes	65,951	94.44%	205,962	94.22%	7,943,688	95.20%
Rejected Votes	3,881	5.56%	12,646	5.78%	400,395	4.80%
Total Polled	69,832	81.32%	218,608	81.88%	8,344,095	74.75%
Registered Electors	85,870		266,974		11,163,064	

=== 1989 Sri Lankan Parliamentary Election ===
Party	Dambulla		Matale Electoral District		Sri Lanka	
Party	Votes	%	Votes	%	Votes	%
UNP	23,381	53.76%	88,869	63.81%	2,838,005	50.71%
SLFP	18,786	43.19%	45,717	32.82%	1,785,369	31.90%
ELJP	882	2.03%	2,350	1.69%	67,723	1.21%
USA	445	1.02%	2,344	1.68%	141,983	2.54%
Valid Votes	43,494	91.93%	139,280	92.11%	5,596,468	93.87%
Rejected Votes	3,818	8.07%	11,927	7.89%	365,563	6.13%
Total Polled	47,312	65.97%	151,207	70.35%	5,962,031	63.60%
Registered Electors	71,722		214,938		9,374,164	

== Demographics ==
=== Ethnicity ===
The Dambulla Polling Division has a Sinhalese majority (90.9%) . In comparison, the Matale Electoral District (which contains the Dambulla Polling Division) has a Sinhalese majority (80.8%)

Ethnicity in Dambulla
1. Sinhalese (90.9%)
2. Moor (7.20%)
3. Sri Lankan Tamil (1.30%)
4. Other (0.50%)

=== Religion ===
The Dambulla Polling Division has a Buddhist majority (88.4%) . In comparison, the Matale Electoral District (which contains the Dambulla Polling Division) has a Buddhist majority (79.5%)

Religion in Dambulla
1. Buddhist (88.4%)
2. Muslim (7.30%)
3. Roman Catholic (2.50%)
4. Hindu (1.60%)
5. Other (0.30%)
