= Matale Polling Division =

Matale
- Polling Division
- Coordinates: 7.544767°N 80.615234°E
- Country: Sri Lanka
- Province: Central Province, Sri Lanka
- Electoral District: Matale Electoral District

Area
  - Total: 139.62 km^{2} (53.91 sq mi)

Population (2012)
  - Total: 105,106
  - Density: 753/km^{2} (1,950/sq mi)
- ISO 3166 code: EC-05C

The Matale Polling Division is a Polling Division in the Matale Electoral District, in the Central Province, Sri Lanka.

== Presidential Election Results ==
=== Summary ===
The winner of Matale has matched the final country result 6 out of 8 times. Hence, Matale is a Weak Bellwether for Presidential Elections.

Year	Matale	Matale Electoral District	MAE %	Sri Lanka	MAE %
2019	NDF	SLPP	8.02%	SLPP	5.34%
2015	NDF	UPFA	9.33%	NDF	5.44%
2010	UPFA	UPFA	9.76%	UPFA	7.85%
2005	UNP	UNP	7.25%	UPFA	9.26%
1999	PA	PA	2.58%	PA	2.36%
1994	PA	PA	1.12%	PA	2.26%
1988	UNP	UNP	5.36%	UNP	11.14%
1982	UNP	UNP	4.24%	UNP	7.84%
Matches/Mean MAE	6/8	6/8	5.96%	8/8	6.44%

=== 2019 Sri Lankan Presidential Election ===
Party	Matale		Matale Electoral District		Sri Lanka	
Party	Votes	%	Votes	%	Votes	%
NDF	33,251	48.01%	134,291	39.59%	5,564,239	41.99%
SLPP	32,486	46.90%	187,821	55.37%	6,924,255	52.25%
NMPP	1,895	2.74%	8,890	2.62%	418,553	3.16%
Other Parties (with < 1%)	1,629	2.35%	8,219	2.42%	345,452	2.61%
Valid Votes	69,261	98.84%	339,221	99.05%	13,252,499	98.99%
Rejected Votes	812	1.16%	3,252	0.95%	135,452	1.01%
Total Polled	70,073	82.59%	342,473	85.30%	13,387,951	83.71%
Registered Electors	84,846		401,496		15,992,568	

=== 2015 Sri Lankan Presidential Election ===
Party	Matale		Matale Electoral District		Sri Lanka	
Party	Votes	%	Votes	%	Votes	%
NDF	36,052	56.65%	145,928	47.22%	6,217,162	51.28%
UPFA	26,684	41.93%	158,880	51.41%	5,768,090	47.58%
Other Parties (with < 1%)	901	1.42%	4,214	1.36%	138,200	1.14%
Valid Votes	63,637	98.80%	309,022	98.83%	12,123,452	98.85%
Rejected Votes	773	1.20%	3,653	1.17%	140,925	1.15%
Total Polled	64,410	76.47%	312,675	78.76%	12,264,377	78.69%
Registered Electors	84,225		397,005		15,585,942	

=== 2010 Sri Lankan Presidential Election ===
Party	Matale		Matale Electoral District		Sri Lanka	
Party	Votes	%	Votes	%	Votes	%
UPFA	26,996	49.67%	157,953	59.74%	6,015,934	57.88%
NDF	26,013	47.86%	100,513	38.01%	4,173,185	40.15%
Other Parties (with < 1%)	1,338	2.46%	5,953	2.25%	204,494	1.97%
Valid Votes	54,347	98.82%	264,419	99.00%	10,393,613	99.03%
Rejected Votes	650	1.18%	2,666	1.00%	101,838	0.97%
Total Polled	54,997	73.18%	267,085	75.08%	10,495,451	66.70%
Registered Electors	75,154		355,738		15,734,587	

=== 2005 Sri Lankan Presidential Election ===
Party	Matale		Matale Electoral District		Sri Lanka	
Party	Votes	%	Votes	%	Votes	%
UNP	29,637	57.62%	125,937	50.25%	4,706,366	48.43%
UPFA	20,945	40.72%	120,533	48.09%	4,887,152	50.29%
Other Parties (with < 1%)	857	1.67%	4,150	1.66%	123,521	1.27%
Valid Votes	51,439	98.22%	250,620	98.51%	9,717,039	98.88%
Rejected Votes	932	1.78%	3,785	1.49%	109,869	1.12%
Total Polled	52,371	73.58%	254,405	76.51%	9,826,908	69.51%
Registered Electors	71,171		332,515		14,136,979	

=== 1999 Sri Lankan Presidential Election ===
Party	Matale		Matale Electoral District		Sri Lanka	
Party	Votes	%	Votes	%	Votes	%
PA	21,709	48.86%	111,232	51.42%	4,312,157	51.12%
UNP	20,185	45.43%	91,944	42.51%	3,602,748	42.71%
JVP	1,392	3.13%	7,924	3.66%	343,927	4.08%
Other Parties (with < 1%)	1,147	2.58%	5,210	2.41%	176,679	2.09%
Valid Votes	44,433	97.11%	216,310	97.23%	8,435,754	97.69%
Rejected Votes	1,322	2.89%	6,171	2.77%	199,536	2.31%
Total Polled	45,755	71.42%	222,481	76.18%	8,635,290	72.17%
Registered Electors	64,069		292,055		11,965,536	

=== 1994 Sri Lankan Presidential Election ===
Party	Matale		Matale Electoral District		Sri Lanka	
Party	Votes	%	Votes	%	Votes	%
PA	25,234	59.84%	121,449	60.98%	4,709,205	62.28%
UNP	16,006	37.96%	73,324	36.82%	2,715,283	35.91%
Other Parties (with < 1%)	930	2.21%	4,391	2.20%	137,040	1.81%
Valid Votes	42,170	97.11%	199,164	97.40%	7,561,526	98.03%
Rejected Votes	1,253	2.89%	5,317	2.60%	151,706	1.97%
Total Polled	43,423	74.05%	204,481	76.95%	7,713,232	69.12%
Registered Electors	58,638		265,743		11,158,880	

=== 1988 Sri Lankan Presidential Election ===
Party	Matale		Matale Electoral District		Sri Lanka	
Party	Votes	%	Votes	%	Votes	%
UNP	12,544	63.13%	37,007	57.85%	2,569,199	50.43%
SLFP	6,889	34.67%	25,825	40.37%	2,289,857	44.95%
SLMP	437	2.20%	1,135	1.77%	235,701	4.63%
Valid Votes	19,870	97.72%	63,967	98.29%	5,094,754	98.24%
Rejected Votes	463	2.28%	1,110	1.71%	91,499	1.76%
Total Polled	20,333	41.63%	65,077	30.13%	5,186,256	55.87%
Registered Electors	48,841		215,999		9,283,143	

=== 1982 Sri Lankan Presidential Election ===
Party	Matale		Matale Electoral District		Sri Lanka	
Party	Votes	%	Votes	%	Votes	%
UNP	22,452	62.77%	94,031	58.11%	3,450,815	52.93%
SLFP	11,632	32.52%	59,299	36.65%	2,546,348	39.05%
JVP	1,400	3.91%	7,169	4.43%	273,428	4.19%
Other Parties (with < 1%)	287	0.80%	1,315	0.81%	249,460	3.83%
Valid Votes	35,771	99.08%	161,814	99.13%	6,520,156	98.78%
Rejected Votes	332	0.92%	1,414	0.87%	80,470	1.22%
Total Polled	36,103	82.61%	163,228	85.97%	6,600,626	80.15%
Registered Electors	43,705		189,867		8,235,358	

== Parliamentary Election Results ==
=== Summary ===
The winner of Matale has matched the final country result 4 out of 7 times. Hence, Matale is a Weak Bellwether for Parliamentary Elections.

Year	Matale	Matale Electoral District	MAE %	Sri Lanka	MAE %
2015	UNP	UNP	7.81%	UNP	7.82%
2010	UPFA	UPFA	7.97%	UPFA	3.20%
2004	UNP	UPFA	7.51%	UPFA	8.05%
2001	UNP	UNP	8.86%	UNP	9.08%
2000	UNP	PA	6.18%	PA	4.20%
1994	UNP	PA	2.69%	PA	4.10%
1989	UNP	UNP	4.99%	UNP	10.61%
Matches/Mean MAE	4/7	7/7	6.57%	7/7	6.72%

=== 2015 Sri Lankan Parliamentary Election ===
Party	Matale		Matale Electoral District		Sri Lanka	
Party	Votes	%	Votes	%	Votes	%
UNP	33,056	57.90%	138,241	49.87%	5,098,916	45.77%
UPFA	21,255	37.23%	126,315	45.57%	4,732,664	42.48%
JVP	2,389	4.18%	10,947	3.95%	544,154	4.88%
Other Parties (with < 1%)	390	0.68%	1,690	0.61%	82,293	0.74%
Valid Votes	57,090	93.31%	277,193	92.73%	11,140,333	95.35%
Rejected Votes	4,043	6.61%	21,537	7.21%	516,926	4.42%
Total Polled	61,180	72.64%	298,917	78.73%	11,684,111	77.66%
Registered Electors	84,225		379,675		15,044,490	

=== 2010 Sri Lankan Parliamentary Election ===
Party	Matale		Matale Electoral District		Sri Lanka	
Party	Votes	%	Votes	%	Votes	%
UPFA	23,734	58.41%	131,069	67.02%	4,846,388	60.38%
UNP	14,659	36.07%	55,737	28.50%	2,357,057	29.37%
DNA	1,974	4.86%	7,636	3.90%	441,251	5.50%
Other Parties (with < 1%)	269	0.66%	1,122	0.57%	34,715	0.43%
Valid Votes	40,636	90.99%	195,564	90.93%	8,026,322	96.03%
Rejected Votes	3,990	8.93%	19,310	8.98%	581,465	6.96%
Total Polled	44,660	59.42%	215,060	60.23%	8,358,246	59.29%
Registered Electors	75,154		357,063		14,097,690	

=== 2004 Sri Lankan Parliamentary Election ===
Party	Matale		Matale Electoral District		Sri Lanka	
Party	Votes	%	Votes	%	Votes	%
UNP	24,058	52.00%	100,642	45.73%	3,486,792	37.73%
UPFA	18,496	39.98%	108,259	49.19%	4,223,126	45.70%
JHU	3,135	6.78%	8,819	4.01%	552,723	5.98%
Other Parties (with < 1%)	577	1.25%	2,342	1.06%	54,554	0.59%
Valid Votes	46,266	92.21%	220,062	91.84%	9,241,931	94.52%
Rejected Votes	3,910	7.79%	19,549	8.16%	534,452	5.47%
Total Polled	50,176	71.82%	239,611	76.66%	9,777,821	75.74%
Registered Electors	69,860		312,556		12,909,631	

=== 2001 Sri Lankan Parliamentary Election ===
Party	Matale		Matale Electoral District		Sri Lanka	
Party	Votes	%	Votes	%	Votes	%
UNP	28,478	60.76%	109,991	50.43%	4,086,026	45.62%
PA	15,044	32.10%	88,999	40.81%	3,330,815	37.19%
JVP	2,816	6.01%	16,063	7.37%	815,353	9.10%
Other Parties (with < 1%)	535	1.14%	3,037	1.39%	62,170	0.69%
Valid Votes	46,873	93.79%	218,090	93.38%	8,955,844	94.77%
Rejected Votes	3,106	6.21%	15,449	6.62%	494,009	5.23%
Total Polled	49,979	74.56%	233,539	77.95%	9,449,878	76.03%
Registered Electors	67,034		299,606		12,428,762	

=== 2000 Sri Lankan Parliamentary Election ===
Party	Matale		Matale Electoral District		Sri Lanka	
Party	Votes	%	Votes	%	Votes	%
UNP	22,089	48.41%	91,836	42.11%	3,451,765	40.12%
PA	19,877	43.57%	110,213	50.53%	3,899,329	45.33%
JVP	2,233	4.89%	10,673	4.89%	518,725	6.03%
Other Parties (with < 1%)	809	1.77%	3,917	1.80%	87,139	1.01%
SU	618	1.35%	1,458	0.67%	127,859	1.49%
Valid Votes	45,626	N/A	218,097	N/A	8,602,617	N/A

=== 1994 Sri Lankan Parliamentary Election ===
Party	Matale		Matale Electoral District		Sri Lanka	
Party	Votes	%	Votes	%	Votes	%
UNP	22,446	51.38%	100,121	48.61%	3,498,370	44.04%
PA	20,607	47.17%	102,680	49.85%	3,887,805	48.94%
Other Parties (with < 1%)	632	1.45%	3,161	1.53%	138,277	1.74%
Valid Votes	43,685	94.32%	205,962	94.22%	7,943,688	95.20%
Rejected Votes	2,630	5.68%	12,646	5.78%	400,395	4.80%
Total Polled	46,315	78.98%	218,608	81.88%	8,344,095	74.75%
Registered Electors	58,638		266,974		11,163,064	

=== 1989 Sri Lankan Parliamentary Election ===
Party	Matale		Matale Electoral District		Sri Lanka	
Party	Votes	%	Votes	%	Votes	%
UNP	21,422	68.85%	88,869	63.81%	2,838,005	50.71%
SLFP	8,553	27.49%	45,717	32.82%	1,785,369	31.90%
USA	773	2.48%	2,344	1.68%	141,983	2.54%
ELJP	364	1.17%	2,350	1.69%	67,723	1.21%
Valid Votes	31,112	92.71%	139,280	92.11%	5,596,468	93.87%
Rejected Votes	2,445	7.29%	11,927	7.89%	365,563	6.13%
Total Polled	33,557	70.62%	151,207	70.35%	5,962,031	63.60%
Registered Electors	47,520		214,938		9,374,164	

== Demographics ==
=== Ethnicity ===
The Matale Polling Division has a Sinhalese majority (68.3%), a significant Moor population (15.1%) and a significant Sri Lankan Tamil population (12.4%) . In comparison, the Matale Electoral District (which contains the Matale Polling Division) has a Sinhalese majority (80.8%)

Ethnicity in Matale
1. Sinhalese (68.3%)
2. Moor (15.1%)
3. Sri Lankan Tamil (12.4%)
4. Indian Tamil (3.70%)
5. Other (0.50%)

=== Religion ===
The Matale Polling Division has a Buddhist majority (67.5%), a significant Muslim population (15.5%) and a significant Hindu population (14.4%) . In comparison, the Matale Electoral District (which contains the Matale Polling Division) has a Buddhist majority (79.5%)

Religion in Matale
1. Buddhist (67.5%)
2. Muslim (15.5%)
3. Hindu (14.4%)
4. Roman Catholic (1.70%)
5. Other (0.80%)
