= Ranjith Aluwihare =

Sri Lankan politician

Hon. Ranjith Aluwihare

Member of Parliament for Matale District
- Incumbent
- Assumed office 17 August 2015
- In office 10 October 2000 – 23 April 2010

Personal details
- Born: May 5, 1958 (age 67)
- Party: United National Party

Ranjith Jinatissa Aluwihare (born May 5, 1958) is a Sri Lankan politician. He is a representative of Matale District for the United National Party in the Parliament of Sri Lanka. He is also the most senior member of the parliament for the United National Party from the Matale District. He is currently the Hon. State Minister of Tourism. He resides in Matale, Aluvihare. He is the son of Alick Aluwihare and brother of Wasantha Aluwihare.

In May 2025, Aluwihare resigned from his post from Samagi Jana Balawegaya.

== See also ==
- List of political families in Sri Lanka
