= Lakshman Wasantha Perera =

Sri Lankan politician

Hon. Lakshman Wasantha Perera MP

Member of Parliament for Matale District
- Incumbent
- Assumed office 8 April 2010

Personal details
- Party: Sri Lanka Freedom Party

Lakshman Wasantha Perera is a Sri Lankan politician, a member of the Parliament of Sri Lanka. He belongs to the Sri Lanka Freedom Party.
