= Janaka Bandara Tennakoon =

Sri Lankan politician

Hon. Janaka Bandara Tennakoon
- ජනක බණ්ඩාර තෙන්නකෝන් ஜனக பண்டார தென்னக்கோன்

Minister of Home Affairs
- In office 12 August 2020 – 18 April 2022
- President: Gotabaya Rajapaksa
- Prime Minister: Mahinda Rajapaksa
- Preceded by: Dullas Alahapperuma
- Succeeded by: Dinesh Gunawardena (Note: As Minister of Home Affairs)

Deputy Minister of Health
- In office 2000–2001

Minister of Local Government and Provincial Councils
- In office 2004–2010

Minister of Lands and Land Development
- In office 2010 – 12 January 2015

Member of Parliament for Matale District
- Incumbent
- Assumed office 16 August 1994

Personal details
- Born: April 13, 1953 (age 72)
- Party: Sri Lanka Freedom Party
- Children: 4

Janaka Bandara Tennakoon is a Sri Lankan politician, a member of the Parliament of Sri Lanka and a former Cabinet Minister. He was educated at Dharmaraja College, Kandy. He contested as the Group Leader of the Matale District of the Central Province and was elected to the Provincial Council with a majority of Proportional Votes in 1993; Elected as a Member of Parliament with a majority of proportional votes in the general election of 1994; Elected as a Member of Parliament from the District of Matale with the majority of proportional votes in the general election of 2000. He also previously served as the Minister of Lands and Land Development and Minister of Public Services, Provincial Councils and Local Government.

He is involved in several committees formed by the government.

== Career ==
Started his career as a Sub Inspector of Police in 1973,

Elected as a Central Province Council Member in 1993,

== Education ==
Completed his primary and secondary education at Dharmaraja College.

Holder of Diploma in Business Management, Mass Communication and Information Technology,

.

== See also ==
- List of political families in Sri Lanka
