= Nandimithra Ekanayake =

Sri Lankan politician (born 1943)

Hon. Nandimithra Ekanayake

Minister of Provincial Councils & Local Government
- In office 2000–2001
- Succeeded by: Chinthana Ekanayake

Deputy Minister of Higher Education
- In office 2010 – 9 January 2015

Member of Parliament for Matale
- In office 2009–2015
- In office 2000–2001
- In office 1989–1999

Chief Minister of Central Province
- In office 1999–2000
- Preceded by: Sarath Ekanayake
- Succeeded by: Sarath Ekanayake

Personal details
- Born: 26 December 1943 (age 82) Handala, British Ceylon
- Party: Sri Lanka Freedom Party
- Other political affiliations: United People's Freedom Alliance
- Spouse: Manel Sujatha Senevirathna

Mahinda Nandimithra Ekanayake (born 26 December 1943) is a Sri Lankan politician.

== Early career ==
Prior to entering politics in 1989, he held a number of positions with the Rural Development Department. At the age of 21, he worked as a rural development officer. He was ultimately promoted to district officer and subsequently served as the Chief Officer in charge of the Rural Development Training Center at Nalanda, Matale. During his time in the Rural Development Department, he became known as a writer and journalist. In 1984, Nandimithra joined the growing Sri Lanka Mahajana Party.

== Political career ==
In 1989, after 23 years of government work, he entered politics. He was first elected to the parliament in 1989 as the Sri Lanka Freedom Party candidate in the Matale electorate. His first appointment was as the Minister of Forestry and Environment. After several years in that post, he took over political leadership of the Central Province as the Chief Minister. He was the deputy minister of higher education, and he pledged support to Opposition Common Candidate Maithripala Sirisena at the 2015 presidential election. He is also an author and journalist who has written for many national newspapers and has written books on Buddhism.
