= Alick Aluwihare =

Sri Lankan politician

Hon. Alick Aluwihare

Member of Parliament for Matale
- In office 1961–1970
- In office 1977–2009

Personal details
- Born: 20 December 1926 Matale
- Died: 17 May 2009 (aged 82)
- Party: United National Party

Wanisekara Bandaranayake Wasala Mudiyanse Ralahamilage Aluwihare Uda Walauwe Alick Aluwihare (commonly known as Alick Aluwihare; 20 December 1926 – 17 May 2009) was a Sri Lankan politician belonging to the United National Party. He was a Sri Lankan Cabinet Minister. He was a Minister of Post & Telecommunication and Minister of Ports & Shipping in the Premadasa cabinet. He was the Home Affairs and Local Government Minister in the Ranil Wickramasinghe Cabinet in 2001 . He was elected to the Sri Lankan Parliament Eight Times from Matale Electoral District.

== Personal life ==
Alick Aluwihare was born in Matale to William Aluwihare a Sri Lankan Government Official and Aluwihare Kumarihamy on December 20, 1926. He was a student of Vijaya College, Matale and later joined St. Thomas' College, Matale. He had an arranged married to Jinawathie a student of Hillwood college on May 9, 1957. He has five children including Ranjith Aluwihare, Wasantha Aluwihare and Daljith Aluwihare who are also Sri Lankan politicians.

== Political career ==
He entered Sri Lankan Parliament by winning a bye election in 1961 from Matale replacing his uncle Bernard Aluwihare who had died. He was member of the Sri Lankan Parliament for nearly 40 years till death in 2009 winning every election except 1970 when he was defeated by 650 votes.

== See also ==
- List of members of the Sri Lankan Parliament who died in office
