= Wasantha Aluwihare =

Sri Lankan politician

Hon. Wasantha Aluwihare MP

Member of Parliament for Matale District
- Incumbent
- Assumed office 8 April 2010

State Minister of Agriculture
- Incumbent
- Assumed office 4 September 2015
- President: Maithripala Sirisena
- Prime Minister: Ranil Wickremesinghe

Deputy Minister of Mahaweli Development and Environment
- In office 12 January 2015 – 4 September 2015
- President: Maithripala Sirisena
- Prime Minister: Ranil Wickremesinghe

Chief Minister of the Central Province of Sri Lanka
- In office 2001–2004
- President: Chandrika Kumaratunge
- Prime Minister: Ranil Wickremesinghe

Personal details
- Born: 16 July 1962 (age 63)
- Party: Samagi Jana Balawegaya

Wasantha Aluwihare (born 16 July 1962) is a Sri Lankan politician from Matale and was a member of the Parliament of Sri Lanka belonging to the United National Party. He was the former State Minister of Agriculture in the United National Party led unity government, He was earlier the Chief Minister of the Central Province of Sri Lanka. He is the son of Alick Aluwihare and brother of Ranjith Aluwihare. He also served as the Deputy Minister of Mahaweli Development and Environment before given the state ministry.
