= 13th Parliament of Sri Lanka =

2004–2010 meeting of the Sri Lankan legislature

| ← | 12th | 14th | → |

Overview
- Legislative body: Parliament of Sri Lanka
- Term: 22 April 2004 – 9 February 2010
- Election: 2 April 2004

Senior parliamentarians
- Speaker: W. J. M. Lokubandara, UNF
- Deputy Speaker and Chairman of Committees: Gitanjana Gunawardena, UPFA (2004–08); Piyankara Jayaratne, UPFA (2008–10)
- Deputy Chairman of Committees: M. Satchithanandan, UNF (2004–06); Piyasiri Wijenayake, UPFA (2006); Ramalingam Chandrasekar, UPFA (2006–10)
- Prime Minister: Mahinda Rajapaksa, UPFA (2004–05); Ratnasiri Wickremanayake, UPFA (2005–10)
- Leader of the Opposition: Ranil Wickremasinghe, UNF
- Leader of the House: Maithripala Sirisena, UPFA (2004–05); Nimal Siripala de Silva, UPFA (2005–10)
- Chief Government Whip: Jeyaraj Fernandopulle, UPFA (2004–08); Dinesh Gunawardena, UPFA (2008–10)
- Chief Opposition Whip: Mahinda Samarasinghe, UNF (2004–06); M. Joseph Michael Perera, UNF (2006–10)

Sessions
- 1st: 22 April 2004 – 21 November 2005
- 2nd: 25 November 2005 – 6 May 2008
- 3rd: 6 June 2008 – 17 May 2009
- 4th: 19 May 2009 – 9 February 2010

The 13th Parliament of Sri Lanka, known officially as the 6th Parliament of the Democratic Socialist Republic of Sri Lanka, was a meeting of the Parliament of Sri Lanka, with the membership determined by the results of the 2004 parliamentary election held on 2 April 2004. The parliament met for the first time on 22 April 2004 and was dissolved on 9 February 2010.

== Election ==
The 13th parliamentary election was held on 2 April 2004. The United People's Freedom Alliance (UPFA), a newly formed opposition alliance, became the largest group in Parliament by winning 105 of the 225 seats. The incumbent United National Front (UNF) won 82 seats. The minority Tamil party Tamil National Alliance (TNA) won 22 seats. Smaller parties won the remaining 16 seats.

=== Results ===
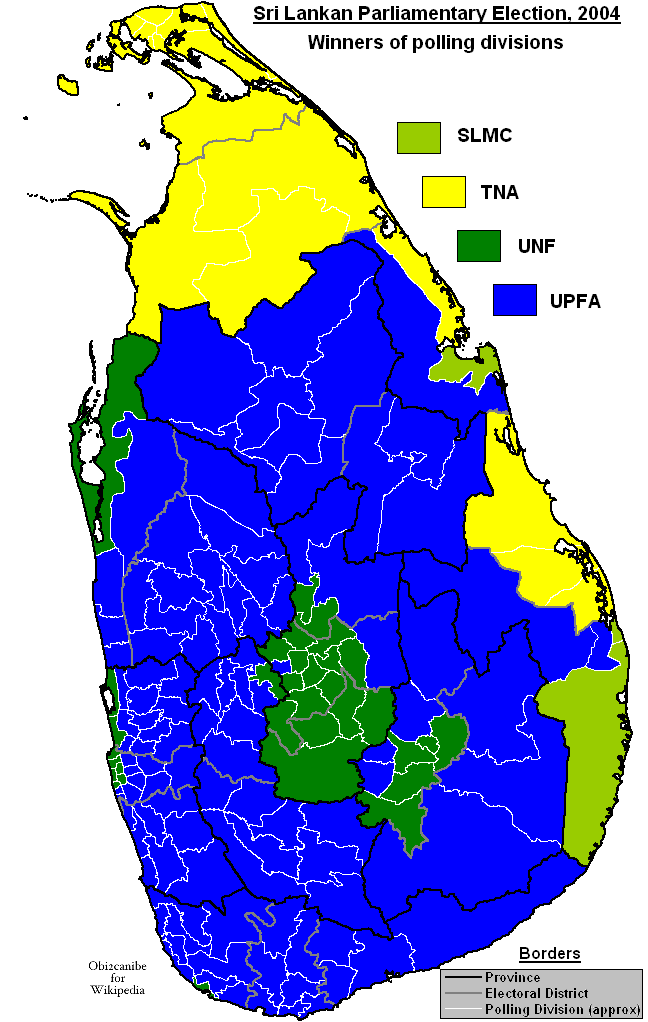
Winners of polling divisions. UPFA in blue and UNF in green.

| Alliance | Votes | % | Seats |
|---|---|---|---|
| United People's Freedom Alliance | 4,223,970 | 45.60% | 105 |
| United National Front | 3,504,200 | 37.83% | 82 |
| Tamil National Alliance | 633,654 | 6.84% | 22 |
| Jathika Hela Urumaya | 552,724 | 5.97% | 9 |
| Sri Lanka Muslim Congress | 186,876 | 2.02% | 5 |
| Up-Country People's Front | 49,728 | 0.54% | 1 |
| Eelam People's Democratic Party | 24,955 | 0.27% | 1 |
| Others | 86,625 | 0.94% | 0 |
| Total | 9,262,732 | 100.00% | 225 |

The new parliament was sworn in on 22 April 2004. W. J. M. Lokubandara, the opposition's candidate, was elected Speaker after three dramatic rounds of voting in Parliament. The parliament reconvened on 18 May 2004 to elect unopposed Gitanjana Gunawardena as Deputy Speaker and M. Satchithanandan as the Deputy Chairman of Committees.

== Government ==
The UPFA was able to form a minority government with the support of the sole Eelam People's Democratic Party MP.

On 6 April 2004, President Chandrika Kumaratunga appointed Mahinda Rajapaksa, the leader of the UPFA, as the new prime minister. The rest of the government, comprising 30 ministers and 31 deputy ministers, was sworn in on 10 April 2004. President Kumaratunga retained control over the important ministries of Defence, Public Security, Law & Order, Highways, Education and Buddha Sasana.

Shortly afterwards, a number of defections and counter-defections from the opposition increased the size of the government to 129 MPs, most of whom were rewarded with ministerial posts. This allowed the UPFA form a stable government which lasted six years.

Following the expiration of the second term of President Kumaratunga, Prime Minister Mahinda Rajapaksa won the 2005 presidential elections. Rajapaksa was succeeded as prime minister by Ratnasiri Wickremanayake.

By January 2007, the government had grown to a size of 104 (52 ministers + 33 non-cabinet ministers + 19 deputy ministers), and by the end of the 13th parliament, would further increase to 109. There were only a handful of UPFA MPs without any ministerial position. The government was the largest government in Sri Lanka's history and proportionally one of the largest in the world, and was fittingly known as the "Jumbo Cabinet" due to its sheer size.

== Changes in party/alliance affiliations ==
The 13th parliament saw a number of defections and counter-defections:

- 18 May 2004 – One SLMC MP (Hussain Ahamed Bhaila) joins the UPFA government.
- 9 August 2004 – 2 SLMC MPs (M. N. Abdul Majeed, Rishad Bathiudeen) join the UPFA government.
- 3 September 2004 – 8 CWC MPs join the UPFA government, giving it a majority in parliament.
- 16 June 2005 – All 39 JVP MPs leave the UPFA government.
- 14 December 2005 – One CWC MP (Vadivel Suresh) joins UPFA government.
- 25 January 2006 – 2 UNP MPs (Keheliya Rambukwella, Mahinda Samarasinghe) cross over to the UPFA.
- 28 January 2007 – 18 UNP MPs and 6 SLMC MPs join the UPFA.
- 30 January 2007 – 8 JHU MPs join the UPFA.
- 12 December 2007 – 4 SLMC MPs leave the UPFA government.
- 28 December 2008 – 12 NFF MPs, who had defected from the JVP earlier in May 2008, join the UPFA government.

== Members ==
=== Deaths and resignations ===
The 13th parliament saw numerous deaths and resignations:

- 18 April 2004 – Kingsley Rasanayagam (TNA/BAT) resigned shortly after being elected, before being sworn in. Replaced by Pakkiyaselvam Ariyanethiran (TNA/BAT).
- 23 April 2004 – Mary Lucida (UPFA/NAT), Janadasa Peiris (UPFA/NAT) and E. A. D. C. Weerasekera (UPFA/NAT) resigned. Their replacements Mervyn Silva (UPFA/NAT), Ratnasiri Wickremanayake (UPFA/NAT) and Wijeyadasa Rajapakshe (UPFA/NAT) were sworn in on 18 May 2004.
- 9 May 2004 – Kathaluwe Rathanaseeha (JHU/COL) resigned. Replaced by Akmeemana Dayarathana (JHU/COL).
- 19 May 2004 – W. P. S. Pushpakumara (UNF/NAT) resigned. Replaced by Basheer Segu Dawood (UNF/NAT).
- 20 May 2004 – Ismail Mohammed Quddus (UNF/NAT) resigned. Replaced by S. Nijamudeen (UNF/NAT).
- 24 May 2004 – Philipps Kumarasinghe Sri Liyanage (UPFA/NAT) resigned. Replaced by Mohamed Mussammil (UPFA/NAT).
- 27 May 2004 – Mahipala Herath (UPFA/KEG) resigned to contest in the Sabaragamuwa provincial council elections. Replaced by H. R. Mithrapala (UPFA/KEG).
- 28 May 2004 – Reginald Cooray (UPFA/KAL) resigned to contest in the Western provincial council elections. Replaced by Nirmala Kotalawala (UPFA/KAL).
- 23 June 2004 – Seyed Ali Zahir Moulana (UNF/NAT) resigned. Replaced by M. Mohamed Musthaffa (UNF/NAT).
- 8 October 2004 – Kolonnawe Sri Sumangala (JHU/GAM) resigned. Replaced by Alawwe Nandaloka (JHU/GAM).
- 7 December 2004 – S. B. Dissanayake (UNF/NUW) lost his seat after being jailed by the Sri Lankan Supreme Court for contempt of court. Replaced by Renuka Herath (UNF/NUW).
- 12 August 2005 – Lakshman Kadirgamar (UPFA/NAT) assassinated. Replaced by Dullas Alahapperuma (UPFA/NAT).
- 19 November 2005 – Mahinda Rajapaksa (UPFA/HAM) resigned to take up presidency. Replaced by Nirupama Rajapaksa (UPFA/HAM).
- 25 December 2005 – Joseph Pararajasingham (TNA/NAT) assassinated. Replaced by Chandra Nehru Chandrakanthan (TNA/NAT).
- 19 April 2006 – Siripala Amarasingha (JVP/GAM) resigned. Replaced by Sarath Kumara Gunaratna (UPFA/GAM).
- 10 November 2006 – Nadarajah Raviraj (TNA/JAF) assassinated. Replaced by Nallathamby Srikantha (TNA/JAF).
- 31 January 2007 – Omalpe Sobhita (JHU/NAT) resigned. Replaced by Champika Ranawaka (JHU/NAT).
- 13 September 2007 – Anwar Ismail (UPFA/NAT) died. Replaced by Basil Rajapaksa (UPFA/NAT).
- 14 December 2007 – M. K. Eelaventhan (TNA/NAT) lost his seat due to non-attendance. Replaced by Raseen Mohammed Imam (TNA/NAT).
- 1 January 2008 – T. Maheswaran (UNF/COL) assassinated. Replaced by Mohamed Rajabdeen (UNF/COL).
- 8 January 2008 – D. M. Dassanayake (UPFA/PUT) assassinated. Replaced by Piyankara Jayaratne (UPFA/PUT).
- 9 February 2008 – Sripathi Sooriyaarachchi (UPFA/GAM) killed. Replaced by Reggie Ranatunga (UPFA/GAM).
- 6 March 2008 – K. Sivanesan (TNA/JAF) assassinated. Replaced by Solomon Cyril (TNA/JAF).
- 16 March 2008 – Anura Bandaranaike (UPFA/GAM) died. Replaced by Sarana Gunawardena (UPFA/GAM).
- 2 April 2008 – Hasen Ali (SLMC/NAT), Rauff Hakeem (SLMC/AMP) and Basheer Segu Dawood (UNF/NAT) resigned to contest the Eastern provincial council elections. Hakeem's replacement A. M. M. Naoshad (SLMC/AMP) was sworn in on 9 April 2008. Segu Dawood's replacement Rauff Hakeem (UNF/NAT) was sworn in on 10 July 2008. Ali replaced himself and was sworn in on 22 July 2008.
- 6 April 2008 – Jeyaraj Fernandopulle (UPFA/GAM) assassinated. Replaced by Dulip Wijeysekara (UPFA/GAM).
- 31 May 2008 – Reggie Ranatunga (UPFA/GAM) died. Replaced by Neil Rupasinghe (UPFA/GAM).
- 30 June 2008 – H. M. Wasantha Samarasinghe (JVP/NAT) resigned to contest in the North Central provincial council elections. Replaced by Vinayagamoorthy Muralitharan (UPFA/NAT).
- 3 September 2008 – Anuruddha Polgampola (UPFA/KEG) resigned. Replaced by Lalith Dissanayake (UPFA/KEG).
- 17 May 2009 – Alick Aluvihare (UNF/MTL) died. Replaced by Nandimithra Ekanayake (UNF/MTL).
- 21 May 2009 – Kanagasabai Pathmanathan (TNA/AMP) died. Replaced by Thomas Thangathurai William (TNA/AMP).
- 30 May 2009 – Amarasiri Dodangoda (UPFA/GAL) died. Replaced by Chandima Weerakkody (UPFA/GAL).
- 25 July 2009 – Sarath Ranawaka (UNF/KAL) died. Replaced by Ananda Lakshman Wijemanna (UNF/KAL).
- 1 January 2010 – Periyasamy Chandrasekaran (UCPF/NUW) died. Replaced by Santhanam Arulsamy (WLF/NUW).

=== List ===
| Name | Electoral District | Preference Votes | Member From | Member To | Elected Party | Elected Alliance | Final Party | Final Alliance | Notes |
|---|---|---|---|---|---|---|---|---|---|
| Abayakoon, Dimuthu Bandara | KAN | 111,923 | 22 April 2004 | 2010-02-09 | JVP | UPFA | JVP | | |
| Abeygunawardena, Rohitha | KAL | 62,598 | 22 April 2004 | 2010-02-09 | SLFP | UPFA | SLFP | UPFA | Deputy Minister of Post, Telecommunications & Udarata Development (04-). Non-Cabinet Minister of Nation Building (07-). |
| Abeywardena, Lakshman Yapa | MTR | 66,498 | 22 April 2004 | 2010-02-09 | UNP | UNF | UNP (D) | UPFA | Non-Cabinet Minister of Media (07-). |
| Abeywardena, Mahinda Yapa | MTR | 60,453 | 22 April 2004 | 2010-02-09 | SLFP | UPFA | SLFP | UPFA | Deputy Minister of Healthcare & Nutrition (04). Minister of Cultural Affairs. |
| Abeywardena, Vajira | GAL | 126,037 | 22 April 2004 | 2010-02-09 | UNP | UNF | UNP | UNF | |
| Adaikalanathan, Selvam | VAN | 39,535 | 22 April 2004 | 2010-02-09 | TELO | TNA | TELO | TNA | |
| Alagiyawanna, Lasantha | GAM | 86,550 | 22 April 2004 | 2010-02-09 | SLFP | UPFA | SLFP | UPFA | Deputy Minister of Transport (04-). Non-Cabinet Minister of Road Passenger Transport (07-). |
| Alahakoon, Sujatha | MTL | 57,234 | 22 April 2004 | 2010-02-09 | JVP | UPFA | JVP | | |
| Alahapperuma, Dullas | NAT | | 19 December 2005 | 2010-02-09 | SLFP | UPFA | SLFP | UPFA | Replaces Lakshman Kadirgamar. Minister of Transport (07-). |
| Ali, Hasen | NAT | | 22 April 2004 | 2008-04-02 | SLMC | | SLMC | UNF | Deputy Minister of Supplementary Crops Development (07). Resigned. Replaced by Hasen Ali. |
| Ali, Hasen | NAT | | 22 July 2008 | 2010-02-09 | SLMC | | SLMC | UNF | Replaces Hasen Ali. |
| Aluthgamage, Mahindananda | KAN | 82,036 | 22 April 2004 | 2010-02-09 | SLFP | UPFA | SLFP | UPFA | Deputy Minister of Power & Energy (04-). Non-Cabinet Minister of Power (07-). |
| Aluvihare, Alick | MTL | 39,649 | 22 April 2004 | 2009-05-17 | UNP | UNF | UNP | UNF | Died. Replaced by Nandimithra Ekanayake. |
| Aluvihare, Ranjith | MTL | 47,152 | 22 April 2004 | 2010-02-09 | UNP | UNF | UNP | UNF | |
| Amarakitti, Kotapola | COL | 26,539 | 22 April 2004 | 2010-02-09 | JHU | | JHU | UPFA | |
| Amarasinghe, Siripala | GAM | 128,633 | 22 April 2004 | 2006-04-19 | JVP | UPFA | JVP | | Resigned. Replaced by Sarath Kumara Gunaratna. |
| Amaratunga, John | GAM | 86,141 | 22 April 2004 | 2010-02-09 | UNP | UNF | UNP | UNF | |
| Amaraweera, Mahinda | HAM | 63,118 | 22 April 2004 | 2010-02-09 | SLFP | UPFA | SLFP | UPFA | Deputy Minister of Urban Development & Water Supply (04-). Non-Cabinet Minister of Water Supply (07-). |
| Ameer, Ali | BAT | 21,232 | 22 April 2004 | 2010-02-09 | SLMC | | ACMC | UPFA | Non-Cabinet Minister of Disaster Relief Services (07-). |
| Amunugama, Sarath | KAN | 78,817 | 22 April 2004 | 2010-02-09 | SLFP | UPFA | SLFP | UPFA | Minister of Finance (04-). M. of Public Administration & Home Affairs (−07). M. of Enterprise Development & Investment Promotion (07-). |
| Ananthan, Sivasakthy | VAN | 29,801 | 22 April 2004 | 2010-02-09 | EPRLF | TNA | EPRLF | TNA | |
| Arachchi, Lakshman Nipuna | COL | 122,645 | 22 April 2004 | 2010-02-09 | JVP | UPFA | JVP | | |
| Ariyanethiran, Pakkiyaselvam | BAT | 35,377 | 18 May 2004 | 2010-02-09 | | TNA | | TNA | Replaces Kingsley Rajanayagam. |
| Arulsamy, Santhanam | NUW | 19,711 | 5 February 2010 | 2010-02-09 | WLF | UPFA | WLF | UPFA | Replaces P. Chandrasekaran. Contested the 2004 election as a candidate of the UCPF but later formed his own party, the Workers' Liberation Front. |
| Ashraff, Ferial | AMP | 52,223 | 22 April 2004 | 2010-02-09 | NUA | UPFA | NUA | UPFA | Minister of Housing Construction & Industries, Education Development in Eastern Province & Irrigation Development (04-). M. of Housing & Common Amenities |
| Athaullah, A. L. M. | AMP | 39,773 | 22 April 2004 | 2010-02-09 | NC | UPFA | NC | UPFA | Minister of Eastern Infrastructure Development (04-). M. of Water Supply & Drainage (07-). |
| Attanayake, Tissa | KAN | 93,971 | 22 April 2004 | 2010-02-09 | UNP | UNF | UNP | UNF | |
| Atukorale, Thalatha | RAT | 113,617 | 22 April 2004 | 2010-02-09 | UNP | UNF | UNP | UNF | |
| Bathiudeen, Rishad | VAN | 15,981 | 22 April 2004 | 2010-02-09 | SLMC | UNF | ACMC | UPFA | Minister of Resettlement & Disaster Relief Services. |
| Banda, R. M. Dharmadasa | MON | 36,104 | 22 April 2004 | 2010-02-09 | UNP | UNF | UNP (D) | UPFA | Minister of Additional Plantation Crops (07-). |
| Banda, Y. M. Nawaratna | KAN | 81,036 | 22 April 2004 | 2010-02-09 | JVP | UPFA | JVP | | |
| Bandara, Palitha Range | PUT | 40,284 | 22 April 2004 | 2010-02-09 | UNP | UNF | UNP | UNF | |
| Bandara, R. M. Ranjith Madduma | MON | 41,889 | 22 April 2004 | 2010-02-09 | UNP | UNF | UNP | UNF | |
| Bandaranaike, Anura | GAM | 198,444 | 22 April 2004 | 2008-03-16 | SLFP | UPFA | SLFP | UPFA | Minister of Industries, Investment Promotion & Tourism (04-07). M. of National Heritage (07-08). Died. Replaced by Sarana Gunawardena. |
| Bandaranaike, Indika | KUR | 65,275 | 22 April 2004 | 2010-02-09 | UNP | UNF | UNP (D) | UPFA | |
| Bandaranaike, Pandu | GAM | 56,715 | 22 April 2004 | 2010-02-09 | SLFP | UPFA | SLFP | UPFA | Deputy Minister of Public Administration & Home Affairs (04-). Non-Cabinet Minister of Religious Affairs (07-). |
| Basnayake, Bandula | KUR | 52,099 | 22 April 2004 | 2010-02-09 | SLFP | UPFA | SLFP | UPFA | Deputy Minister of Environment & Natural Resources (04-). Non-Cabinet Minister of Sports (07-). |
| Bhaila, Hussain Ahamed | NAT | | 22 April 2004 | 2010-02-09 | SLMC | UNF | ACMC | UPFA | Deputy Minister of Foreign Affairs (07-). |
| Bogollagama, Rohitha | KUR | 44,206 | 22 April 2004 | 2010-02-09 | UNP | UNF | UNP (D) | UPFA | Minister of Foreign Affairs (07-). |
| Cader, A. R. M. Abdul | KAN | 89,829 | 22 April 2004 | 2010-02-09 | UNP | UNF | UNP | UNF | |
| Chandrakanthan, Chandra Nehru | NAT | | 27 September 2006 | 2010-02-09 | | TNA | | TNA | Replaces Joseph Pararajasingham. |
| Chandrasekar, Ramalingam | NAT | | 22 April 2004 | 2010-02-09 | JVP | UPFA | JVP | | Deputy Chairman of Committees (06-10). |
| Chandrasekaran, Periyasamy | NUW | 42,582 | 22 April 2004 | 2010-01-01 | UCPF | | UCPF | UPFA | Minister of Community Development & Social Inequity Eradication. Died. Replaced by Santhanam Arulsamy. |
| Chandrasena, S. M. | ANU | 56,651 | 22 April 2004 | 2010-02-09 | SLFP | UPFA | SLFP | UPFA | Deputy Minister of Estate Community Infrastructure (04-). Non-Cabinet Minister of Nation Building (07-). |
| Choksy, K. N. | NAT | | 22 April 2004 | 2010-02-09 | UNP | UNF | UNP | UNF | |
| Cooray, Reginald | KAL | 78,693 | 22 April 2004 | 2004-05-28 | SLFP | UPFA | SLFP | UPFA | Minister of Information & Media (04-). Resigned. Replaced by Nirmala Kotalawala. |
| Cyril, Solomon | JAF | 31,177 | 9 April 2008 | 2010-02-09 | | TNA | | TNA | Replaces K. Sivanesan. |
| Dassanayake, D. M. | PUT | 55,775 | 22 April 2004 | 2008-01-08 | SLFP | UPFA | SLFP | UPFA | Deputy Minister of Livestock Development (04-). Non-Cabinet Minister of Nation Building (07-). Murdered. Replaced by Piyankara Jayaratne. |
| Dawood, Basheer Segu | NAT | | 20 July 2004 | 2008-04-02 | SLMC | UNF | SLMC | UNF | Replaces W.P.S. Pushpakumara. Non-Cabinet Minister of Local Government (07). Resigned. Replaced by Rauff Hakeem. |
| Dayarathana, Akmeemana | COL | 10,220 | 8 June 2004 | 2010-02-09 | JHU | | JHU | UPFA | Replaces Kathaluwe Rathanaseeha. |
| Dayaratna, Petikirige | AMP | 31,215 | 22 April 2004 | 2010-02-09 | UNP | UNF | UNP (D) | UPFA | Minister of Planning Implementation (07-). |
| de Silva, Nimal Siripala | BAD | 96,799 | 22 April 2004 | 2010-02-09 | SLFP | UPFA | SLFP | UPFA | Minister of Health Care & Nutrition (04-). Leader of the House (05-10). |
| Devananda, Douglas | JAF | 9,405 | 22 April 2004 | 2010-02-09 | EPDP | | EPDP | UPFA | Minister of Agriculture, Marketing Development, Hindu Education Affairs, Tamil Language & Vocational Training Centres in North (04-). M. of Social Services & Social Welfare. |
| Dhammaloka, Uduwe | COL | 42,850 | 22 April 2004 | 2010-02-09 | JHU | | JHU | UPFA | |
| Dissanayake, Anura Kumara | KUR | 153,868 | 22 April 2004 | 2010-02-09 | JVP | UPFA | JVP | | |
| Dissanayake, Duminda | ANU | 72,710 | 22 April 2004 | 2010-02-09 | SLFP | UPFA | SLFP | UPFA | Deputy Minister of Skills Development, Vocational & Technical Education (04-). Non-Cabinet Minister of Petroleum Resources (07-). |
| Dissanayake, Lalith | KEG | 33,648 | 5 September 2008 | 2010-02-09 | SLFP | UPFA | SLFP | UPFA | Replaces Anuruddha Polgampala. |
| Dissanayake, Navin | NAT | | 22 April 2004 | 2010-02-09 | UNP | UNF | UNP (D) | UPFA | Deputy Minister of Investment Promotion (07-). |
| Dissanayake, P. Weerakumara | PUT | 50,194 | 22 April 2004 | 2010-02-09 | JVP | UPFA | NFF | UPFA | |
| Dissanayake, Rohana | MTL | 37,091 | 22 April 2004 | 2010-02-09 | SLFP | UPFA | SLFP | UPFA | Deputy Minister of Samurdhi & Poverty Alleviation (04-). Non-Cabinet Minister of Urban Development (07-). |
| Dissanayake, Salinda | KUR | 52,520 | 22 April 2004 | 2010-02-09 | SLFP | UPFA | SLFP | UPFA | Deputy Minister of River Basin & Rajarata Development (04-). Non-Cabinet Minister of Coconut Development (07-). |
| Dissanayake, S. B. | NUW | 71,723 | 22 April 2004 | 2004-12-07 | UNP | UNF | UNP | UNF | Vacated seat. Replaced by Renuka Herath. |
| Dodangoda, Amarasiri | GAL | 60,282 | 22 April 2004 | 2009-05-30 | SLFP | UPFA | SLFP | UPFA | Minister of Public Administration & Home Affairs (04-). M. of Justice & Legal Reforms (07-). Died. Replaced by Chandima Weerakkody. |
| Eelaventhan, M. K. | NAT | | 22 April 2004 | 2007-12-14 | | TNA | | TNA | Vacated seat. Replaced by Raseen Mohammed Imam. |
| Ekanayake, Nandimithra | MTL | 33,017 | 9 June 2009 | 2010-02-09 | UNP | UNF | UNP (D) | UPFA | Replaces Alick Aluvihare. |
| Ekanayake, T. B. | KUR | 57,079 | 22 April 2004 | 2010-02-09 | SLFP | UPFA | SLFP | UPFA | Deputy Minister of Highways (04-). Non-Cabinet Minister of Highways (07-). |
| Ekanayake, W. B. | ANU | 38,183 | 22 April 2004 | 2010-02-09 | UNP | UNF | UNP (D) | UPFA | Deputy Minister of Highways (07-). |
| Faizal, Cassim | AMP | 20,724 | 22 April 2004 | 2010-02-09 | SLMC | | SLMC | UNF | Deputy Minister of Scientific Affairs (07). |
| Fernando, Johnston | KUR | 112,601 | 22 April 2004 | 2010-02-09 | UNP | UNF | UNP (D) | UPFA | |
| Fernando, Milroy | PUT | 36,545 | 22 April 2004 | 2010-02-09 | SLFP | UPFA | SLFP | UPFA | Minister of Christian Affairs & Parliamentary Affairs (04-). M. of Public Estate Management & Development (07-). |
| Fernandopulle, Jeyaraj | GAM | 90,307 | 22 April 2004 | 2008-04-06 | SLFP | UPFA | SLFP | UPFA | Chief Government Whip (04-08). Minister of Trade, Commerce & Consumer Affairs (04-07). M. of Highways & Road Development. M. of Parliamentary Affairs (−07). Murdered. Replaced by Duleep Wijesekera. |
| Fowzie, A. H. M. | COL | 49,719 | 22 April 2004 | 2010-02-09 | SLFP | UPFA | SLFP | UPFA | Minister of Environment & Natural Resources (04-). M. of Petroleum & Petroleum Resources Development. |
| Gajadeera, Chandrasiri | MTR | 46,138 | 22 April 2004 | 2010-02-09 | CPSL | UPFA | CPSL | UPFA | Deputy Minister of Housing & Construction Industry, Eastern Province Education & Irrigation Development (04-). Non-Cabinet Minister of Home Affairs (07-). |
| Galappaththi, Nihal | HAM | 96,039 | 22 April 2004 | 2010-02-09 | JVP | UPFA | JVP | | |
| Gamage, Piyasena | GAL | 71,307 | 22 April 2004 | 2010-02-09 | SLFP | UPFA | SLFP | UPFA | Minister of Skills Development, Vocational & Technical Education (04-). M. of Vocational & Technical Training. |
| Gamalath, Siripala | POL | 47,085 | 22 April 2004 | 2010-02-09 | SLFP | UPFA | SLFP | UPFA | Deputy Minister of Agricultural Marketing Development (04-). D.M. of Agrarian Services (07-). |
| Ganesan, Mano | COL | 51,508 | 22 April 2004 | 2010-02-09 | DPF | UNF | DPF | UNF | |
| Gankanda, Dunesh | RAT | 42,738 | 22 April 2004 | 2010-02-09 | UNP | UNF | UNP | UNF | |
| Gunaratna, Sarath Kumara | GAM | 54,968 | 23 May 2006 | 2010-02-09 | SLFP | UPFA | SLFP | UPFA | Replaces Siripala Amarasinghe. Deputy Minister of Aviation (07-). |
| Gunasekara, Deepal | RAT | 76,883 | 22 April 2004 | 2010-02-09 | JVP | UPFA | NFF | UPFA | |
| Gunasekara, Earl | POL | 38,681 | 22 April 2004 | 2010-02-09 | UNP | UNF | UNP | UNF | |
| Gunasekara, Edward | GAM | 44,890 | 22 April 2004 | 2010-02-09 | UNP | UNF | UNP | UNF | Joined UPFA. Deputy Minister of Railways (07-). Went back to UNP. |
| Gunasekera, D. E. W. | NAT | | 22 April 2004 | 2010-02-09 | CPSL | UPFA | CPSL | UPFA | Minister of Constitutional Affairs & National Integration. |
| Gunasekera, R. M. P. U. S. | MON | 71,115 | 22 April 2004 | 2010-02-09 | JVP | UPFA | NFF | UPFA | |
| Gunathilake, Nandana | KAL | 135,743 | 22 April 2004 | 2010-02-09 | JVP | UPFA | SLFP | UPFA | Was an independent MP, joined NFF, quit NFF, joined SLFP. |
| Gunawardena, Bandula | COL | 57,460 | 22 April 2004 | 2010-02-09 | UNP | UNF | UNP (D) | UPFA | Minister of Trade, Marketing Development & Consumer Affairs (07-). |
| Gunawardena, Dinesh | COL | 82,626 | 22 April 2004 | 2010-02-09 | MEP | UPFA | MEP | UPFA | Minister of Urban Development & Water Supply (04-07); M. of Urban Development & Sacred Areas (07-). Chief Government Whip (08-10). Deputy Minister of Education (04-). |
| Gunawardena, Gitanjana | NAT | | 22 April 2004 | 2010-02-09 | MEP | UPFA | MEP | UPFA | Deputy Speaker & Chairman of Committees (04-08). |
| Gunawardena, Sarana | GAM | 52,288 | 6 May 2008 | 2010-02-09 | SLFP | UPFA | SLFP | UPFA | Replaces Anura Bandaranaike. |
| Hakeem, Rauff | AMP | 68,627 | 22 April 2004 | 2008-04-02 | SLMC | | SLMC | UNF | Minister of Posts & Telecommunication (07). Resigned. Replaced by A. M. M. Naoshad. |
| Hakeem, Rauff | NAT | | 10 July 2008 | 2010-02-09 | SLMC | UNF | SLMC | UNF | Replaces Basheer Segu Dawood. |
| Haleem, M. H. A. | KAN | 66,669 | 22 April 2004 | 2010-02-09 | UNP | UNF | UNP | UNF | |
| Handunnetti, Sunil | COL | 152,942 | 22 April 2004 | 2010-02-09 | JVP | UPFA | JVP | | |
| Harrison, Pelisge | ANU | 60,777 | 22 April 2004 | 2010-02-09 | UNP | UNF | UNP | UNF | |
| Hashim, Kabir | KEG | 69,372 | 22 April 2004 | 2010-02-09 | UNP | UNF | UNP | UNF | |
| Herath, Jayarathna | KUR | 53,876 | 22 April 2004 | 2010-02-09 | SLFP | UPFA | SLFP | UPFA | Deputy Minister of Public Security, Law & Order (04-). Non-Cabinet Minister of Health Promotion & Disease Prevention (07-). |
| Herath, Maheepala | KEG | 71,682 | 22 April 2004 | 2004-05-27 | SLFP | UPFA | SLFP | UPFA | Deputy Minister of Transport (04-). Resigned. Replaced by H. R. Mithrapala. |
| Herath, Renuka | NUW | 45,701 | 30 January 2006 | 2010-02-09 | UNP | UNF | UNP | UNF | Replaces S.B. Dissanayake. |
| Herath, Samansiri | PUT | 38,113 | 22 April 2004 | 2010-02-09 | JVP | UPFA | NFF | UPFA | |
| Herath, Vijitha | GAM | 215,540 | 22 April 2004 | 2010-02-09 | JVP | UPFA | JVP | | |
| Imam, Raseen Mohammed | NAT | | 8 January 2008 | 2010-02-09 | | TNA | | TNA | Replaces M. K. Eelaventhan. |
| Isadean, M. H. Segu | NAT | | 22 April 2004 | 2010-02-09 | NUA | UPFA | NUA | UPFA | Deputy Minister of Information & Media (04-). Non-Cabinet Minister of Export Development (07-). |
| Ismail, Mohamed Ismail Anwar | NAT | | 22 April 2004 | 2007-09-13 | NC | UPFA | NC | UPFA | Deputy Minister of Infrastructure Development in the Eastern Province (04-). Non-Cabinet Minister of Irrigation (07). Died. Replaced by Basil Rajapaksa. |
| Jagodage, Achala | RAT | 97,083 | 22 April 2004 | 2010-02-09 | JVP | UPFA | NFF | UPFA | |
| Jayaratne, D. M. | KAN | 64,317 | 22 April 2004 | 2010-02-09 | SLFP | UPFA | SLFP | UPFA | Minister of Posts, Telecommunications & Upcountry Development (04-07). M. of Plantations (07-). |
| Jayaratne, Piyankara | PUT | 33,144 | 14 January 2008 | 2010-02-09 | SLFP | UPFA | SLFP | UPFA | Replaces D. M. Dassanayake. Deputy Speaker & Chairman of Committees (08-10). |
| Jayasekara, Dayasiri | KUR | 52,576 | 22 April 2004 | 2010-02-09 | UNP | UNF | UNP | UNF | |
| Jayasekara, Premalal | RAT | 71,982 | 22 April 2004 | 2010-02-09 | SLFP | UPFA | SLFP | UPFA | Deputy Minister of River Basin & Rajarata Development (04-). |
| Jayasena, Sumedha G. | MON | 47,538 | 22 April 2004 | 2010-02-09 | SLFP | UPFA | SLFP | UPFA | Minister of Women Affairs & Social Welfare (04-). M. of Child Development & Women's Empowerment. |
| Jayasinghe, Chandrani Bandara | ANU | 49,471 | 22 April 2004 | 2010-02-09 | UNP | UNF | UNP | UNF | |
| Jayasinghe, N. D. N. P. | NUW | 44,229 | 22 April 2004 | 2010-02-09 | JVP | UPFA | NFF | UPFA | |
| Jayasuriya, Karu | GAM | 202,029 | 22 April 2004 | 2010-02-09 | UNP | UNF | UNP | UNF | Joined UPFA, returned to UNP. Minister of Public Administration & Home Affairs (07-). |
| Jayawardana, Jayalath | GAM | 93,643 | 22 April 2004 | 2010-02-09 | UNP | UNF | UNP | UNF | |
| Jegadhiswaran, S. | NUW | 81,386 | 22 April 2004 | 2010-02-09 | CWC | UNF | CWC | UPFA | Deputy Minister of National Integration (07-). |
| Jeyanandamoorthy, Senathirajah | BAT | 44,457 | 22 April 2004 | 2010-02-09 | | TNA | | TNA | |
| Kadirgamar, Lakshman | NAT | | 22 April 2004 | 2005-08-12 | SLFP | UPFA | SLFP | UPFA | Minister of Foreign Affairs (04-). Murdered. Replaced by Dullas Alahapperuma. |
| Kajendren, Selvarajah | JAF | 112,077 | 22 April 2004 | 2010-02-09 | | TNA | | TNA | |
| Kamardeen, Abdul Baiz | NAT | | 22 April 2004 | 2010-02-09 | SLMC | UNF | SLMC (D) | UPFA | Deputy Minister of Provincial Councils (07-). |
| Kanagaratnam, Sathasivam | VAN | 30,390 | 22 April 2004 | 2010-02-09 | | TNA | | TNA | |
| Kanagasabai, Thanmanpillai | BAT | 57,843 | 22 April 2004 | 2010-02-09 | | TNA | | TNA | |
| Karalliyadde, Tissa | ANU | 40,933 | 22 April 2004 | 2010-02-09 | SLFP | UPFA | SLFP | UPFA | Minister of Indigenous Medicine (04-). |
| Kariyawasam, Akila Viraj | KUR | 83,114 | 22 April 2004 | 2010-02-09 | UNP | UNF | UNP | UNF | |
| Karunanayake, Ravi | COL | 69,975 | 22 April 2004 | 2010-02-09 | UNP | UNF | UNP | UNF | |
| Karunaratne, M. D. Namal | KUR | 114,516 | 22 April 2004 | 2010-02-09 | JVP | UPFA | JVP | | |
| Karunatileka, Gayantha | GAL | 55,757 | 22 April 2004 | 2010-02-09 | UNP | UNF | UNP | UNF | |
| Kathiraman, Thangeswary | BAT | 50,545 | 22 April 2004 | 2010-02-09 | | TNA | | TNA | |
| Kiriella, Lakshman | KAN | 81,136 | 22 April 2004 | 2010-02-09 | UNP | UNF | UNP | UNF | |
| Kisshor, Sivanathan | VAN | 17,653 | 22 April 2004 | 2010-02-09 | | TNA | | TNA | |
| Kitulagoda, Jinadasa | MTR | 109,417 | 22 April 2004 | 2010-02-09 | JVP | UPFA | JVP | | |
| Kotalawala, Nirmala | KAL | 55,461 | 20 July 2004 | 2010-02-09 | SLFP | UPFA | SLFP | UPFA | Replaces Reginold Cooray. Non-Cabinet Minister of Education Services (07-). |
| Kumara, Ajith | GAL | 128,060 | 22 April 2004 | 2010-02-09 | JVP | UPFA | JVP | | |
| Kumaranatunga, Jeewan | COL | 51,583 | 22 April 2004 | 2010-02-09 | SLFP | UPFA | SLFP | UPFA | Minister of Sports & Youth Affairs (04-). Non-Cabinet Minister of Sports (−07); M. of Lands & Land Development (07-) |
| Lalkantha, K. D. | ANU | 114,319 | 22 April 2004 | 2010-02-09 | JVP | UPFA | JVP | | |
| Lokubandara, W. J. M. | BAD | 56,954 | 22 April 2004 | 2010-02-09 | UNP | UNF | UNP | UNF | Speaker (04-10). |
| Lokuge, Gamini | COL | 53,810 | 22 April 2004 | 2010-02-09 | UNP | UNF | UNP (D) | UPFA | Minister of Sports (07-). |
| Lucida, J. A. Mary | NAT | | 22 April 2004 | 2004-04-23 | SLFP | UPFA | SLFP | UPFA | Resigned. Replaced by Mervyn Silva. |
| Maheswaran, Thiagarasah | COL | 57,978 | 22 April 2004 | 2008-01-01 | UNP | UNF | UNP | UNF | Killed. Replaced by Mohamed Rajabdeen. |
| Majeed, M. N. Abdul | TRI | 26,948 | 22 April 2004 | 2010-02-09 | SLMC | | ACMC | UPFA | Non-Cabinet Minister of Co-operatives (07-). |
| Mahroof, Mohamed | COL | 55,919 | 22 April 2004 | 2010-02-09 | UNP | UNF | UNP | UNF | |
| Manage, Pemasiri | MTR | 101,558 | 22 April 2004 | 2010-02-09 | JVP | UPFA | JVP | | |
| Medhananda, Ellawala | NAT | | 22 April 2004 | 2010-02-09 | JHU | | JHU | UPFA | |
| Mithrapala, H. R. | KEG | 36,297 | 3 June 2004 | 2010-02-09 | SLFP | UPFA | SLFP | UPFA | Replaces Maheepala Herath. Non-Cabinet Minister of Consumer Affairs (07-). |
| Mohamed, M. H. | COL | 62,559 | 22 April 2004 | 2010-02-09 | UNP | UNF | UNP (D) | UPFA | Minister of Parliamentary Affairs (07-). |
| Moragoda, Milinda | COL | 99,146 | 22 April 2004 | 2010-02-09 | UNP | UNF | UNP (D) | UPFA | Minister of Tourism (07-). |
| Moulana, Seyed Ali Zahir | NAT | | 22 April 2004 | 2004-06-23 | UNP | UNF | UNP | UNF | Resigned. Replaced by M. Mohamed Musthaffa. |
| Muralitharan, Vinayagamoorthy | NAT | | 7 October 2008 | 2010-02-09 | SLFP | UPFA | SLFP | UPFA | Replaces H. M. Wasantha Samarasinghe. |
| Mussammil, Mohamed | NAT | | 1 June 2004 | 2010-02-09 | JVP | UPFA | NFF | UPFA | Replaces Philipps Kumarasinghe Sri Liyanage. |
| Musthaffa, M. Mohamed | NAT | | 29 June 2004 | 2010-02-09 | UNP | UNF | UNP (D) | UPFA | Replaces Seyed Ali Zaheer Moulana. Deputy Minister of Higher Education (07-). |
| Musthapha, Faiszer | KAN | 40,475 | 22 April 2004 | 2010-02-09 | CWC | UNF | | UPFA | Deputy Minister of Tourism (07-). |
| Nanayakkara, Hemakumara | GAL | 81,382 | 22 April 2004 | 2010-02-09 | UNP | UNF | UNP (D) | UPFA | Deputy Minister of Agriculture (07-). Non-Cabinet Minister of Agriculture (07-). |
| Nanda, Udawatte | KAN | 10,846 | 22 April 2004 | 2010-02-09 | JHU | | JHU | UPFA | |
| Nandaloka, Alawwe | GAM | 5,829 | 17 November 2004 | 2010-02-09 | JHU | | JHU | UPFA | Replaces Kolonnawe Sri Sumangala. |
| Naoshad, A. M. M. | AMP | 19,192 | 9 April 2008 | 2010-02-09 | SLMC | | SLMC | UNF | Replaces Rauff Hakeem. |
| Nawinne, S. B. | KUR | 53,079 | 22 April 2004 | 2010-02-09 | SLFP | UPFA | SLFP | UPFA | Minister of Regional Infrastructure Development (04-). M. of Rural Industries & Self-Employment Promotion. |
| Nijamudeen, Sihabdeen | NAT | | 20 July 2004 | 2010-02-09 | SLMC | UNF | SLMC (D) | UPFA | Replaces Mohammed Quddus. |
| Noharathalingam, Vino | VAN | 28,252 | 22 April 2004 | 2010-02-09 | TELO | TNA | TELO | TNA | |
| Pararajasingham, Joseph | NAT | | 22 April 2004 | 2005-12-25 | ITAK | TNA | ITAK | TNA | Murdered. Replaced by Chandra Nehru Chandrakanthan. |
| Pathirana, R. P. A. Ranaweera | ANU | 103,086 | 22 April 2004 | 2010-02-09 | JVP | UPFA | JVP | | |
| Pathmanathan, Kanagasabai | AMP | 29,002 | 22 April 2004 | 2009-05-21 | | TNA | | TNA | Died. Replaced by Thomas Thangathurai William. |
| Peiris, G. L. | NAT | | 22 April 2004 | 2010-02-09 | UNP | UNF | UNP (D) | UPFA | Minister of Export Development & International Trade (07-). |
| Peiris, Janadasa | NAT | | 22 April 2004 | 2004-04-23 | SLFP | UPFA | SLFP | UPFA | Resigned. Replaced by Ratnasiri Wickremanayake. |
| Perera, Dilan | BAD | 64,655 | 22 April 2004 | 2010-02-09 | SLFP | UPFA | SLFP | UPFA | Deputy Minister of Ports & Aviation (04-). Non-Cabinet Minister of Justice (07-). |
| Perera, Felix | GAM | 72,616 | 22 April 2004 | 2010-02-09 | SLFP | UPFA | SLFP | UPFA | Minister of Transport (04-). M. of Fisheries & Aquatic Resources (07-). |
| Perera, Gamini Jayawickrama | KUR | 119,176 | 22 April 2004 | 2010-02-09 | UNP | UNF | UNP | UNF | |
| Perera, Larine | PUT | 36,846 | 22 April 2004 | 2010-02-09 | UNP | UNF | UNP | UNF | |
| Perera, M. Joseph Michael | GAM | 95,231 | 22 April 2004 | 2010-02-09 | UNP | UNF | UNP | UNF | Chief Opposition Whip (06-10). |
| Perera, Neomal | PUT | 45,150 | 22 April 2004 | 2010-02-09 | UNP | UNF | UNP (D) | UPFA | Deputy Minister of Fisheries (07-). |
| Piyatissa, L. G. Wasantha | AMP | 45,975 | 22 April 2004 | 2010-02-09 | SLFP | UPFA | SLFP | UPFA | |
| Polgampala, Anuruddha | KEG | 84,981 | 22 April 2004 | 2008-09-03 | JVP | UPFA | JVP | | Resigned. Replaced by Lalith Dissanayake. |
| Ponnambalam, Gajendrakumar | JAF | 60,770 | 22 April 2004 | 2010-02-09 | ACTC | TNA | ACTC | TNA | |
| Premachandran, Suresh | JAF | 45,786 | 22 April 2004 | 2010-02-09 | EPRLF | TNA | EPRLF | TNA | |
| Premadasa, A. D. Champika | KEG | 44,391 | 22 April 2004 | 2010-02-09 | UNP | UNF | UNP | UNF | |
| Premadasa, Sajith | HAM | 82,968 | 22 April 2004 | 2010-02-09 | UNP | UNF | UNP | UNF | |
| Premajayanth, Susil | COL | 100,074 | 22 April 2004 | 2010-02-09 | SLFP | UPFA | SLFP | UPFA | Minister of Power & Energy (04-). M. of Education. |
| Premasiri, Lionel | GAL | 39,519 | 22 April 2004 | 2010-02-09 | UNP | UNF | UNP (D) | UPFA | Deputy Minister of Social Services & Social Welfare (07-). |
| Punchinilame, Susantha | RAT | 96,591 | 22 April 2004 | 2010-02-09 | UNP | UNF | UNP (D) | UPFA | Deputy Minister of Public Estate Management & Development (07-). |
| Punnananda, Aparekke | GAM | 7,389 | 22 April 2004 | 2010-02-09 | JHU | | JHU | UPFA | |
| Pushpakumara, A. P. Jagath | MON | 52,887 | 22 April 2004 | 2010-02-09 | SLFP | UPFA | SLFP | UPFA | Deputy Minister of Samurdhi & Poverty Alleviation (04-). Non-Cabinet Minister of Nation Building (07-). |
| Pushpakumara, W. P. S. | NAT | | 22 April 2004 | 2004-05-19 | SLMC | UNF | SLMC | UNF | Resigned. Replaced by Basheer Segu Dawood. |
| Puththirasigamoney, Vadivel | NAT | | 22 April 2004 | 2010-02-09 | CWC | UNF | | UPFA | |
| Quddus, Ismail Mohammed | NAT | | 22 April 2004 | 2004-05-20 | SLMC | UNF | SLMC | UNF | Resigned. Replaced by S. Nijamudeen. |
| Radhakrishnan, P. | NAT | | 22 April 2004 | 2010-02-09 | UCPF | UNF | UCPF | UPFA | |
| Rajabdeen, Mohamed | COL | 42,319 | 8 January 2008 | 2010-02-09 | SLMC | UNF | SLMC | UNF | Replaces T. Maheswaran. |
| Rajakaruna, Sarath Chandra | GAM | 55,337 | 22 April 2004 | 2010-02-09 | UNP | UNF | UNP | UNF | |
| Rajanayagam, Kingsley | BAT | 38,633 | 22 April 2004 | 2004-04-18 | | TNA | | TNA | Resigned. Replaced by Pakkiyaselvam Ariyanethiran. |
| Rajapaksa, Basil | NAT | | 19 September 2007 | 2010-02-09 | SLFP | UPFA | SLFP | UPFA | Replaces Mohamed Ismail Anwar Ismail. |
| Rajapaksa, Chamal | HAM | 56,416 | 22 April 2004 | 2010-02-09 | SLFP | UPFA | SLFP | UPFA | Deputy Minister of Plantation Industries (04-). Minister of Irrigation & Water Management (07-). |
| Rajapaksa, Mahinda | HAM | 107,603 | 22 April 2004 | 2005-11-19 | SLFP | UPFA | SLFP | UPFA | Prime Minister (04-05). M. of Highways (04-). Elected President. Replaced by Nirupama Rajapaksa. |
| Rajapaksa, Nirupama | HAM | 26,651 | 25 November 2005 | 2010-02-09 | SLFP | UPFA | SLFP | UPFA | Replaces Mahinda Rajapaksa. |
| Rajapaksa, Wijeyadasa | NAT | | 14 May 2004 | 2010-02-09 | SLFP | UPFA | SLFP | UPFA | Replaces E. A. D. C. Weerasekera. |
| Rambukwella, Keheliya | KAN | 110,720 | 22 April 2004 | 2010-02-09 | UNP | UNF | UNP (D) | UPFA | Non-Cabinet Minister of Planning & Plan Implementation (06-07). M. of Employment Promotion & Welfare (07-). |
| Ranatunga, Arjuna | COL | 81,914 | 22 April 2004 | 2010-02-09 | SLFP | UPFA | SLFP | UPFA | |
| Ranatunga, Reggie Padmasena | GAM | 54,414 | 21 February 2008 | 2008-05-31 | SLFP | UPFA | SLFP | UPFA | Replaces Sripathi Sooriyarachchi. Died. Replaced by Neil Rupasinghe. |
| Ranawaka, Champika | NAT | | 31 January 2007 | 2010-02-09 | JHU | | JHU | UPFA | Replaces Omalpe Sobhita. |
| Ranawaka, Sarath | KAL | 48,380 | 22 April 2004 | 2009-07-25 | UNP | UNF | UNP | UNF | Died. Replaced by Ananda Lakshman Wijemanna. |
| Ranaweera, Jayatissa | RAT | 40,382 | 22 April 2004 | 2010-02-09 | SLFP | UPFA | SLFP | UPFA | Deputy Minister of Provincial Councils & Local Government (04-). Non-Cabinet Minister of Textile Industries (07-). |
| Ranaweera, Vijitha | HAM | 86,184 | 22 April 2004 | 2010-02-09 | JVP | UPFA | JVP | | |
| Rathana, Athuraliye | KAL | 10,772 | 22 April 2004 | 2010-02-09 | JHU | | JHU | UPFA | |
| Rathnayaka, Bimal | KUR | 116,736 | 22 April 2004 | 2010-02-09 | JVP | UPFA | JVP | | |
| Rathnayake, C. B. | NUW | 55,284 | 22 April 2004 | 2010-02-09 | SLFP | UPFA | SLFP | UPFA | Minister of Plantation Community Infrastructure Development (04-). M. of Livestock Development. |
| Rathnayake, R. M. Gamini | KEG | 90,070 | 22 April 2004 | 2010-02-09 | JVP | UPFA | JVP | | |
| Rathanaseeha, Kathaluwe | COL | 10,512 | 22 April 2004 | 2004-05-18 | JHU | | JHU | | Resigned. Replaced by Akmeemana Dayarathana. |
| Ratnatilaka, Mahinda | RAT | 36,289 | 22 April 2004 | 2010-02-09 | UNP | UNF | UNP (D) | UPFA | |
| Ratnayaka, Sagala | MTR | 59,888 | 22 April 2004 | 2010-02-09 | UNP | UNF | UNP | UNF | |
| Ratnayake, Amara Piyaseeli | KUR | 46,725 | 22 April 2004 | 2010-02-09 | UNP | UNF | UNP | UNF | |
| Raviraj, Nadarajah | JAF | 42,965 | 22 April 2004 | 2006-11-10 | ITAK | TNA | ITAK | TNA | Murdered. Replaced by Nallathamby Srikantha. |
| Rupasinghe, Neil | GAM | 35,110 | 6 June 2008 | 2010-02-09 | SLFP | UPFA | SLFP | UPFA | Replaces Reggie Ranatunga. |
| Samarasinghe, H. M. Wasantha | NAT | | 22 April 2004 | 2008-06-30 | JVP | UPFA | JVP | | Resigned. Replaced by Vinayagamoorthy Muralitharan. |
| Samarasinghe, Mahinda | KAL | 93,758 | 22 April 2004 | 2010-02-09 | UNP | UNF | SLFP | UPFA | Chief Opposition Whip (04-06). Minister of Natural Disaster Management (06-). |
| Samaraweera, S. A. Jayantha | KAL | 95,461 | 22 April 2004 | 2010-02-09 | JVP | UPFA | NFF | UPFA | |
| Samaraweera, Mangala | MTR | 118,848 | 22 April 2004 | 2010-02-09 | SLFP | UPFA | SLFP (P) | UNF | Minister of Ports & Aviation Services (04-). M. of Foreign Affairs (−07). Deputy Minister of Education (04-). |
| Samaraweera, Ravindra | BAD | 49,387 | 22 April 2004 | 2010-02-09 | UNP | UNF | UNP | UNF | |
| Sampanthan, Rajavarothiam | TRI | 47,735 | 22 April 2004 | 2010-02-09 | ITAK | TNA | ITAK | TNA | |
| Satchithanandan, Murugan | BAD | 44,934 | 22 April 2004 | 2010-02-09 | CWC | UNF | UNP | UNF | Deputy Chairman of Committees (04-06). Deputy Minister of Education (07-09). |
| Sellasamy, M. S. | NAT | | 22 April 2004 | 2010-02-09 | CWC | UNF | | UNF | Deputy Minister of Posts (07-). |
| Senanayake, Rukman | KEG | 43,630 | 22 April 2004 | 2010-02-09 | UNP | UNF | UNP | UNF | |
| Senaratne, Rajitha | KAL | 97,001 | 22 April 2004 | 2010-02-09 | UNP | UNF | UNP (D) | UPFA | Minister of Construction & Engineering Services (07-). |
| Senathirajah, Mavai | JAF | 38,783 | 22 April 2004 | 2010-02-09 | ITAK | TNA | ITAK | TNA | |
| Senewiratne, Athauda | KEG | 53,892 | 22 April 2004 | 2010-02-09 | SLFP | UPFA | SLFP | UPFA | Minister of Labour Relations & Foreign Employment (04-). M. of Labour Relations & Manpower. |
| Senewiratne, John | RAT | 84,284 | 22 April 2004 | 2010-02-09 | SLFP | UPFA | SLFP | UPFA | Minister of Justice & Judicial Reforms (04-). M. of Power & Energy. |
| Senewiratne, Lakshman | BAD | 40,820 | 22 April 2004 | 2010-02-09 | UNP | UNF | UNP | UNF | |
| Shivajilingam, M. K. | JAF | 42,193 | 22 April 2004 | 2010-02-09 | TELO | TNA | TELO | TNA | |
| Silva, Mervyn | NAT | | 30 April 2004 | 2010-02-09 | SLFP | UPFA | SLFP | UPFA | Replaces J. A. Mary Lucida. Non-Cabinet Minister of Labour (07-). |
| Sirisena, Maithripala | POL | 72,451 | 22 April 2004 | 2010-02-09 | SLFP | UPFA | SLFP | UPFA | Leader of the House (04-05). Minister of River Basin & Rajarata Development (04-). M. of Agricultural Development & Agrarian Services. |
| Sithamparanathan, Pathmini | JAF | 68,240 | 22 April 2004 | 2010-02-09 | | TNA | | TNA | |
| Sivalingam, Muthu | NUW | 85,708 | 22 April 2004 | 2010-02-09 | CWC | UNF | CWC | UPFA | Deputy Minister of Estate Infrastructure (07-). |
| Sivanesan, Kiddinan | JAF | 43,730 | 22 April 2004 | 2008-03-06 | | TNA | | TNA | Murdered. Replaced by Solomon Cyril. |
| Siyambalapitiya, Ranjith | KEG | 80,485 | 22 April 2004 | 2010-02-09 | SLFP | UPFA | SLFP | UPFA | Deputy Minister of Finance (04-). Non-Cabinet Minister of State Revenue & Finance (07-). |
| Sobhitha, Omalpe | NAT | | 22 April 2004 | 2007-01-31 | JHU | | JHU | | Resigned. Replaced by Champika Ranawaka. |
| Sooriyaarachchi, Sripathi | GAM | 76,637 | 22 April 2004 | 2008-02-09 | SLFP | UPFA | SLFP | UPFA | Deputy Minister of Sports & Youth Affairs (04-). Non-Cabinet Minister of Port Development (07-). Killed. Replaced by Reggie Ranatunga. |
| Sri Liyanage, Philipps | NAT | | 22 April 2004 | 2004-05-24 | JVP | UPFA | JVP | UPFA | Resigned. Replaced by Mohamed Mussammil. |
| Sri Sumangala, Kolonnawe | GAM | 25,154 | 22 April 2004 | 2004-10-08 | JHU | | JHU | | Resigned. Replaced by Alawwe Nandaloka. |
| Srikantha, Nallathamby | JAF | 33,205 | 30 November 2006 | 2010-02-09 | TELO | TNA | TELO | TNA | Replaces Nadarajah Raviraj. |
| Subasinghe, S. K. | POL | 61,580 | 22 April 2004 | 2010-02-09 | JVP | UPFA | JVP | | |
| Suresh, Vadivel | BAD | 37,520 | 22 April 2004 | 2010-02-09 | CWC | UNF | PWC | UPFA | Deputy Minister of Health & Nutrition (05-). D.M. of Health (07-). |
| Suriyaarachchi, C. A. | POL | 37,983 | 22 April 2004 | 2010-02-09 | UNP | UNF | UNP (D) | UPFA | Deputy Minister of Land & Land Development (07-). |
| Tennakoon, Janaka Bandara | MTL | 54,711 | 22 April 2004 | 2010-02-09 | SLFP | UPFA | SLFP | UPFA | Minister of Local Government & Provincial Councils (04-). |
| Thissera, Dayasritha | PUT | 41,190 | 22 April 2004 | 2010-02-09 | SLFP | UPFA | SLFP | UPFA | Deputy Minister of Ports & Aviation (04-). Non-Cabinet Minister of Skills Development (07-). |
| Thondaman, Arumugan | NUW | 99,783 | 22 April 2004 | 2010-02-09 | CWC | UNF | CWC | UPFA | Minister of Youth Empowerment & Socio-Economic Development. |
| Thurairetnasingam, K. | TRI | 34,773 | 22 April 2004 | 2010-02-09 | ITAK | TNA | ITAK | TNA | |
| Umma, Anjan | GAM | 111,755 | 22 April 2004 | 2010-02-09 | JVP | UPFA | NFF | UPFA | |
| Vidyaratna, K. V. Samantha | BAD | 98,848 | 22 April 2004 | 2010-02-09 | JVP | UPFA | JVP | | |
| Vitharana, Tissa | NAT | | 22 April 2004 | 2010-02-09 | LSSP | UPFA | LSSP | UPFA | Minister of Science & Technology (04-). |
| Wanniarachchi, Pavithra Devi | RAT | 125,592 | 22 April 2004 | 2010-02-09 | SLFP | UPFA | SLFP | UPFA | Minister of Samurdhi & Poverty Alleviation (04-). M. of Youth Affairs (07-). |
| Warnapala, W. A. Wiswa | NAT | | 22 April 2004 | 2010-02-09 | SLFP | UPFA | SLFP | UPFA | Minister of Higher Education (07-). |
| Wedaarachchi, Dilip | HAM | 40,738 | 22 April 2004 | 2010-02-09 | UNP | UNF | UNP | UNF | |
| Weerakkody, Chandima | GAL | 52,665 | 9 June 2009 | 2010-02-09 | SLFP | UPFA | SLFP | UPFA | Replaces Amarasiri Dodangoda. |
| Weerakoon, Gunaratna | GAL | 58,154 | 22 April 2004 | 2010-02-09 | SLFP | UPFA | SLFP | UPFA | Deputy Minister of Regional Infrastructure Development (04-). Non-Cabinet Minister of Nation Building (07-). |
| Weerasekera, E. A. D .C. | NAT | | 22 April 2004 | 2004-04-23 | SLFP | UPFA | SLFP | UPFA | Resigned. Replaced by Wijeyadasa Rajapakshe. |
| Weerawansa, Wimal | COL | 237,185 | 22 April 2004 | 2010-02-09 | JVP | UPFA | NFF | UPFA | |
| Welgama, Kumara | KAL | 73,350 | 22 April 2004 | 2010-02-09 | SLFP | UPFA | SLFP | UPFA | Deputy Minister of Power & Energy (04-). Minister of Industrial Development (07-). |
| Wickremanayake, Ratnasiri | NAT | | 30 April 2004 | 2010-02-09 | SLFP | UPFA | SLFP | UPFA | Replaces Janadasa Peiris. Prime Minister (05-). Minister of Internal Administration. |
| Wickremasinghe, Ranil | COL | 329,524 | 22 April 2004 | 2010-02-09 | UNP | UNF | UNP | UNF | Leader of the Opposition (04-10). |
| Wijemanna, Ananda Lakshman | KAL | 37,147 | 6 August 2009 | 2010-02-09 | UNP | UNF | UNP | UNF | Replaces Sarath Ranawaka. |
| Wijenayake, Piyasiri | KAL | 75,982 | 22 April 2004 | 2010-02-09 | JVP | UPFA | NFF | UPFA | Deputy Chairman of Committees (06). |
| Wijesekara, Mahinda | MTR | 72,563 | 22 April 2004 | 2010-02-09 | UNP | UNF | UNP (D) | UPFA | Minister of Special Projects (07-). |
| Wijesekara, Jayantha | TRI | 19,983 | 22 April 2004 | 2010-02-09 | SLFP | UPFA | SLFP | UPFA | |
| Wijesekera, Duleep | GAM | 48,018 | 6 May 2008 | 2010-02-09 | SLFP | UPFA | SLFP | UPFA | Replaces Jeyaraj Fernandopulle. |
| Wijesinghe, Chandrasena | GAL | 101,377 | 22 April 2004 | 2010-02-09 | JVP | UPFA | JVP | | |
| Wijeyeratne, Mano | KEG | 44,272 | 22 April 2004 | 2010-02-09 | UNP | UNF | UNP (D) | UPFA | Deputy Minister of Enterprise Development (07-). Non-Cabinet Minister of Enterprise Development (07-). |
| William, Thomas Thangathurai | AMP | 9,029 | 12 June 2009 | 2010-02-09 | | TNA | | TNA | Replaces Kanagasabai Pathmanathan. |
| Withanachchi, Thilakaratne | GAL | 85,627 | 22 April 2004 | 2010-02-09 | JVP | UPFA | JVP | | |
| Yapa, Anura Priyadharshana | KUR | 65,724 | 22 April 2004 | 2010-02-09 | SLFP | UPFA | SLFP | UPFA | Minister of Plantation Industries (04-). M. of Mass Media & Information. |
