= P. Radhakrishnan =

P. Radhakrishnan may refer to:

- P. Radhakrishnan (politician), Sri Lankan politician
- P. Radhakrishnan (scientist) (born 1943), Indian space scientist, author and speaker
