= M. Satchithanandan =

Sri Lankan politician (born 1957)

Hon. Murugan Satchithanandan MP

Deputy Minister of Education
- In office 2007–2009

Deputy Chairman of Committees
- In office 18 May 2004 – 25 August 2006
- Preceded by: Siri Andrahennady
- Succeeded by: Piyasiri Wijenayake

Member of Parliament for Badulla District
- In office 2004–2010

Personal details
- Born: 22 August 1957 (age 69)
- Party: United National Party
- Other political affiliations: United National Front
- Children: Yashanthan Satchithanandan

Murugan Satchithanandan (Murugan Sachiththanantha) (born 22 August 1957) is a Sri Lankan politician, former member of the Parliament of Sri Lanka and former deputy minister of education.
