= Joint Opposition =

Joint Opposition may refer to:

- Joint Opposition (Sri Lanka), a political alliance in Sri Lanka
- Joint Opposition (Soviet Union), a faction in the All-Union Communist Party (Bolsheviks)
