= Mylanthanai =

Mylanthanai (Tamil: மயிலந்தனை) was a minority Sri Lankan Tamil populated village in the Eastern Province of Sri Lanka in the Batticaloa district. As part of the Sri Lankan civil war, people from the village were displaced in 1990 and again after a Mylanthanai massacre in August 1992.

They had taken refuge in Valaichenai refugee camp. Although, an international agency had helped the displaced people to clear Mylanthanai and other villages and had also supplied tents and other materials for resettlement, they have been unable to settle back in their village.
