= Siri Andrahennady =

Sri Lankan politician

Hon. Siri Alexander Andrahennady

Deputy Chairman of Committees
- In office 19 December 2001 – 7 February 2004
- Preceded by: Lalith Dissanayake
- Succeeded by: M. Satchithanandan

Member of Parliament for Hambantota
- In office 2000–2004

Personal details
- Born: 18 July 1946 (age 80)
- Party: United National Party
- Education: Ananda College
- Profession: lawyer, politician

Siri Alexander Andrahennady (born 18 July 1946) is a Sri Lankan politician who has served as Deputy Chairman of Committees (2001–2004).

Siri Andrahennady is an Attorney-at-Law and Notary Public and received his early education at Ananda College, Colombo.

Andrahennady was elected Chairman of the Tangalle Town Council from 1989–1993. He was the elected onto the Southern Provincial Council 1994–1999, where he served as Minister of Agriculture, Fisheries and Local Government.

At the 11th parliamentary elections in October 2000 Andrahennady was elected as the United National Party member representing the Hambantota electorate. He was re-elected at the subsequent parliamentary elections in December 2001 and was then elected unopposed as the Deputy Chairman of Committees. At the April 2004 parliamentary elections, he failed to retain his seat.
