= Mohamed Rajabdeen =

Sri Lankan politician

Hon. Mohamed Rajabdeen

Member of Parliament for Colombo District
- In office 2008–2010
- Preceded by: T. Maheswaran

Member, Western Provincial Council
- In office 2004–2008

Personal details
- Born: 27 December 1954 (age 71)
- Party: Sri Lanka Muslim Congress
- Other political affiliations: United National Front
- Spouse: Shah N Rajabdeen
- Education: Carey College Colombo

Mohamed Shafeek Rajabdeen is a Sri Lankan politician and a former member of the Parliament of Sri Lanka.
