= Sripathi Sooriyarachchi =

Sri Lankan politician (1962–2008)

Hon. Sripathi Sooriyarachchi MP

Member of Parliament for Gampaha District
- In office 22 April 2004 – 9 February 2008
- Succeeded by: Reggie Ranatunga
- Majority: 76,637 Preferential Votes

Personal details
- Born: 8 September 1962 Gampaha, Sri Lanka
- Died: 9 February 2008 (aged 45) Galgamuwa, Sri Lanka
- Party: Sri Lanka Freedom Party
- Other political affiliations: United People's Freedom Alliance
- Spouse: Dilrukshi Sooriyarachchi
- Children: 4
- Education: St. Anthony's College, Wattala; Sri Lanka Law College
- Occupation: Lawyer

Sripathi Sooriyarachchi (8 September 1962 – 9 February 2008) was a Sri Lankan politician. He was a member of parliament, non-cabinet minister, deputy minister, lawyer and former navy officer.

He was fired from his cabinet position after he accused Sri Lanka's president Mahinda Rajapaksa of entering into an accord with LTTE. He had alleged he faced death threats. In March 2007, he was arrested on charges of misusing a government vehicle He was associated with the Sri Lanka Freedom Party Mahajana faction. His parliamentary web page identified him as a member of parliament for the district of Gampaha, a member of the United People's Freedom Alliance, and a Buddhist.
