= Rauff Hakeem =

Sri Lankan politician

Hon. Rauff Hakeem MP
- රවුෆ් හකීම් ரவூப் ஹக்கீம்
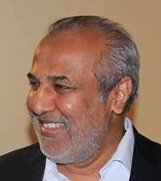

Minister of Urban Development, Water Supply and Drainage (Note: Minister of City Planning and Water Supply from September 2015.)
- In office 12 January 2015 – 3 June 2019
- President: Maithripala Sirisena
- Prime Minister: Ranil Wickremesinghe

Minister of Justice
- In office 22 November 2010 – 28 December 2014
- President: Mahinda Rajapaksa
- Prime Minister: D. M. Jayaratne
- Preceded by: Athauda Seneviratne
- Succeeded by: Wijeyadasa Rajapakshe

Minister of Posts and Telecommunication
- In office 28 January 2007 – 16 December 2007
- President: Mahinda Rajapaksa
- Prime Minister: D. M. Jayaratne

Minister of Ports Development and Shipping
- In office December 2001 – April 2004
- President: Chandrika Kumaratunga
- Prime Minister: Ranil Wickremesinghe
- Preceded by: Mahinda Rajapaksa
- Succeeded by: Mangala Samaraweera

Minister of Internal and International Trade Commerce, Muslim Religious Affairs and Shipping Development
- In office 19 October 2000 – 20 June 2001
- President: Chandrika Kumaratunga
- Prime Minister: Ratnasiri Wickremanayake
- Succeeded by: Ronnie de Mel (Note: As Minister of Trade, Industrial Development and Rural Industries)

Deputy Chairman of Committees of the Parliament of Sri Lanka
- In office 25 August 1994 – 18 August 2000
- Preceded by: Ariya B. Rekawa
- In office 14 September 2000 – 10 October 2000
- Succeeded by: Lalith Dissanayake

Leader of Sri Lanka Muslim Congress
- Incumbent
- Assumed office 2000
- Preceded by: M. H. M. Ashraff

Member of Parliament for Kandy District
- Incumbent
- Assumed office 2010
- In office 2000–2004

Member of Parliament for Ampara District
- In office 2004–2008
- Succeeded by: A. M. M. Naushad

Member of Parliament for National List
- In office 2008–2010
- Preceded by: Basheer Segu Dawood
- In office 1994–2000

Member of the Eastern Provincial Council for Trincomalee District
- In office 2008–2008
- Succeeded by: A. U. Razik Fareed

Personal details
- Born: 13 April 1960 (age 66) Nawalapitiya, Ceylon
- Party: Sri Lanka Muslim Congress
- Other political affiliations: Samagi Jana Balawegaya
- Education: Royal College, Colombo, Sri Lanka Law College
- Profession: Attorney-at-law
- Website: rauffhakeem.lk

Abdul Rauff Hibbathul Hakeem (born 13 April 1960) is a Sri Lankan politician and current member of parliament, representing the Kandy electorate since 2010. Hakeem is the leader of the Sri Lanka Muslim Congress (SLMC), the largest Islamic party in Sri Lanka.

== Early life and education ==
Hakeem was born 13 April 1960 in Nawalapitiya in Kandy District. He was educated at Royal College, Colombo and attended the Sri Lanka Law College, taking oath as an attorney-at-law. He later gained a LL.M. degree from the University of Colombo.

== Political career ==
Hakeem met M. H. M. Ashraff, founder of the Sri Lanka Muslim Congress, whilst working at Faisz Musthapha's law chambers.

Hakeem joined the SLMC in 1988. He served as general-secretary of the party from 1992 to 2000 and represented the party at the All Party Conference from 1991 to 1993. Prior to the 1994 parliamentary election, the SLMC entered an electoral pact with main opposition alliance, the People's Alliance (PA).

After the election, Hakeem was appointed as a PA National List MP in the Sri Lankan Parliament. Following the PA's victory, the SLMC joined the new government. Ashraff was appointed Minister of Shipping, Ports and Rehabilitation and two other SLMC MPs became deputy ministers whilst Hakeem became Deputy Chairman of Committees.

By 2000, relations between the SLMC and PA had become strained. In 1999, Ashraff founded the National Unity Alliance (NUA) with the aim of creating a "united Sri Lanka by 2012". Ashraff was killed in a mysterious helicopter crash on 16 September 2000.

Following Ashraff's death, Hakeem became the SLMC's 'thesiya thalaivar' (national leader), however, a power struggle ensued between Ashraff's widow Ferial Ashraff and Hakeem for control of the party.

Hakeem contested the 2000 parliamentary election as one of the NUA's candidates in the Kandy District. He was elected and re-entered Parliament. He was appointed Minister of Internal and International Trade Commerce, Muslim Religious Affairs and Shipping Development after the election. In June 2001, president Chandrika Kumaratunga dismissed Hakeem from his ministerial position. As a result, Hakeem and most SLMC MPs left the PA. However, Ferial Ashraff remained in the PA as leader of the NUA.

In October 2001, the Hakeem-led SLMC joined the United National Party-led United National Front (UNF). Hakeem contested the 2001 parliamentary election as one of the UNF's candidates in the Kandy District, and was successfully reelected. The UNF defeated the PA at the election, after which Hakeem was appointed Minister of Ports Development and Shipping in the UNF government.

Hakeem contested the 2004 parliamentary election as one of the SLMC's candidates in the Ampara District. He was elected and re-entered Parliament. He however lost his cabinet position after the UNF was defeated by the newly formed United People's Freedom Alliance (UPFA).

In January 2007, the SLMC joined the UPFA. Hakeem was rewarded by being appointed Minister of Posts and Telecommunication. The SLMC left the UPFA in December 2007. Hakeem resigned from Parliament in April 2008 to contest the provincial council election. He contested the 2008 provincial council election as one of the UNF's candidates in the Trincomalee District and was elected to the Eastern Provincial Council (EPC). After the UNF failed to win control of the EPC, Hakeem resigned in July 2008 and was appointed as a UNF National List MP.

Hakeem contested the 2010 parliamentary election as one of the UNF's candidates in the Kandy District. He was elected and re-entered Parliament.

In November 2010, the SLMC defected to the UPFA again, and Hakeem was appointed as Minister of Justice.

In December 2014, the SLMC left the UPFA to support common opposition candidate Maithripala Sirisena at the presidential election. President Mahinda Rajapaksa dismissed Hakeem from his ministerial position. Following his victory, newly elected President Sirisena appointed Hakeem as Minister of Urban Development, Water Supply and Drainage in the new cabinet.

In July 2015, the SLMC joined with other anti-Rajapaksa parties to form the United National Front for Good Governance (UNFGG) to contest the parliamentary election. Hakeem was one of the UNFGG's candidates in the Kandy District at the 2015 parliamentary election. He was elected and re-entered Parliament. His cabinet portfolio was changed to Minister of City Planning and Water Supply following the election.

In 2020, following opposition leader Sajith Premadasa's split from the UNP, the SLMC opted to join Premadasa's new alliance, the Samagi Jana Balawegaya. In the 2020 parliamentary election, Hakeem was reelected to parliament as a candidate of the SJB in the Kandy District, and was reelected again in 2024.

== Personal life ==
Hakeem is married to Shanaz (Shahnaz), owner of an ice cream parlour in Colombo.

=== Kumari Cooray controversy ===
During Hakeem's 2001 parliamentary election campaign, Kumari Cooray, daughter of politician Mervyn J. Cooray, claimed and then denied that she had been having an affair with Hakeem. In May 2004, during the struggle to fill the Speaker position in Parliament, Cooray appeared on Rupavahini and claimed that Hakeem had ended their relationship and that she was suicidal. Cooray killed herself by setting herself ablaze outside Hakeem's home in Kollupitiya on 6 October 2005. According to the Sunday Times, two months prior to her suicide Cooray had made a complaint at Kollupitiya police station that Hakeem had assaulted her at her home.

== Electoral history ==
Electoral history of Rauff Hakeem
Election	Constituency	Party	Alliance	Votes	Result
2000 parliamentary	Kandy District	SLMC	NUA	28,033	Elected
2001 parliamentary	Kandy District	SLMC	UNF	71,094	Elected
2004 parliamentary	Ampara District	SLMC		68,627	Elected
2008 provincial	Trincomalee District	SLMC	UNF		Elected
2010 parliamentary	Kandy District	SLMC	UNF	54,047	Elected
2015 parliamentary	Kandy District	SLMC	UNFGG	102,186	Elected
2020 parliamentary	Kandy District	SLMC	SJB	83,398	Elected
2024 parliamentary	Kandy District	SLMC	SJB	30,883	Elected
