= Lalith Dissanayake =

Sri Lankan politician (born 1955)

Hon. Lalith Dissanayake MP

Deputy Minister of Technology & Research
- In office 2010 – 9 January 2015

Deputy Chairman of Committees
- In office 18 October 2000 – 10 October 2001
- Preceded by: Rauff Hakeem
- Succeeded by: Siri Andrahennady

Member of Parliament for Kegalle District
- In office 2008–2015
- Preceded by: Anuruddha Polgampala
- In office 2000–2001

Personal details
- Born: Lalith Chandra Buddhisiri Dissanayake; 19 November 1955 (age 70)
- Party: Sri Lanka Freedom Party
- Other political affiliations: United People's Freedom Alliance
- Education: Dharmaraja College

Lalith Chandra Buddhisiri Dissanayake (born 19 November 1955) is a Sri Lankan politician, a member of the Parliament of Sri Lanka and a government minister. He is an alumnus of Dharmaraja College.

He served as Deputy Minister of Technology & Research from 2010 till January 2015. In October 2000 he was elected Deputy Chairman of Committees, a position he held until October 2001.
