= Rishi Senthil Raj =

Sri Lankan politician

Hon. Rishi Senthil Raj
- ரிஷி செந்தில் ராஜ் රිෂි සෙන්දිල් රාජ්
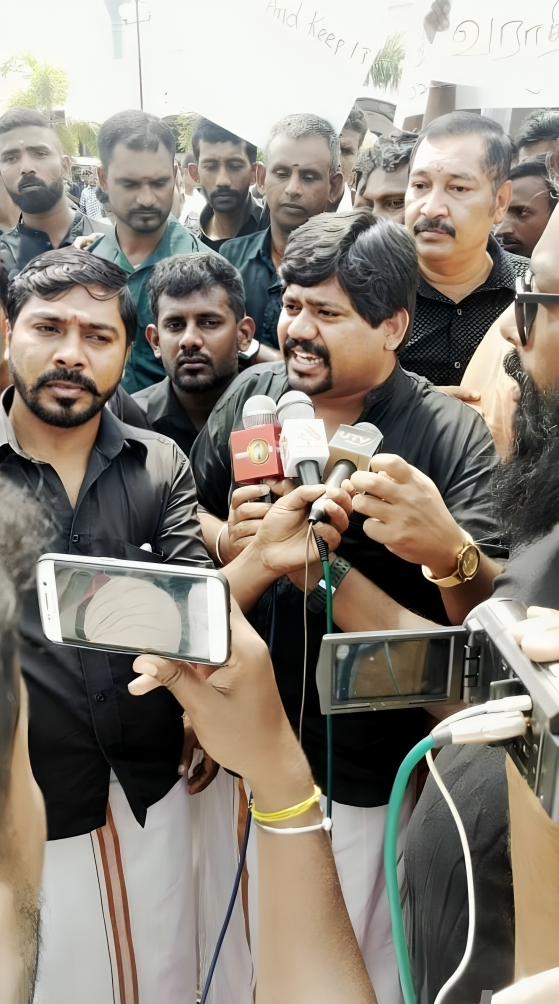
- Raj in November 2020

Leader of the Upcountry National Front
- Incumbent
- Assumed office 14 January 2012

Member of Parliament for Nuwara Eliya District
- Incumbent
- Assumed office 1 November 2015

Personal details
- Born: 20 May 1979 (age 47)
- Party: Upcountry National Front

Rishi Senthil Raj (Tamil: ரிஷி செந்தில் ராஜ்; born 20 May 1979), also known by his initials RS, is a Sri Lankan politician and political strategist. He is the leader of the Upcountry National Front (UNF), a minor political party in Sri Lanka.

== Early life and education ==
Rishi Senthil Raj was born on 20 May 1979. He was educated at St. Anthony's College, Colombo, and Vivekananda College, Colombo. He did his tertiary education in Switzerland and the United States, and holds a PhD in computer science.

He is married.

== Career ==
In addition to politics, Raj is also a tactician, businessman, gemologist and gem trader. In the 2019 presidential election, he supported the campaign of SLPP candidate Gotabaya Rajapaksa.
