= V. Puththirasigamoney =

Sri Lankan politician

Hon. Vadivel Puththirasigamoney MP

Member of Parliament for National List
- In office 2004–2010

Personal details
- Born: 10 October 1951 (age 74)
- Party: United People's Freedom Alliance

Vadivel Puththirasigamoney (born 10 October 1951) is a Sri Lankan politician and a former member of the Parliament of Sri Lanka.

Educated at Holy Trinity College, Commercial College and Administrative Staff College in India . ILO/Un Staff College Torino, Italy (Followed Diploma in Strategic use of IT. Have special diploma in Industrial Law.

Deputy Minister of Justice and Law Reforms 2007-2010
