= Hussein Ahamed Bhaila =

Sri Lankan politician

Hon. Hussain Ahamed Bhaila MP
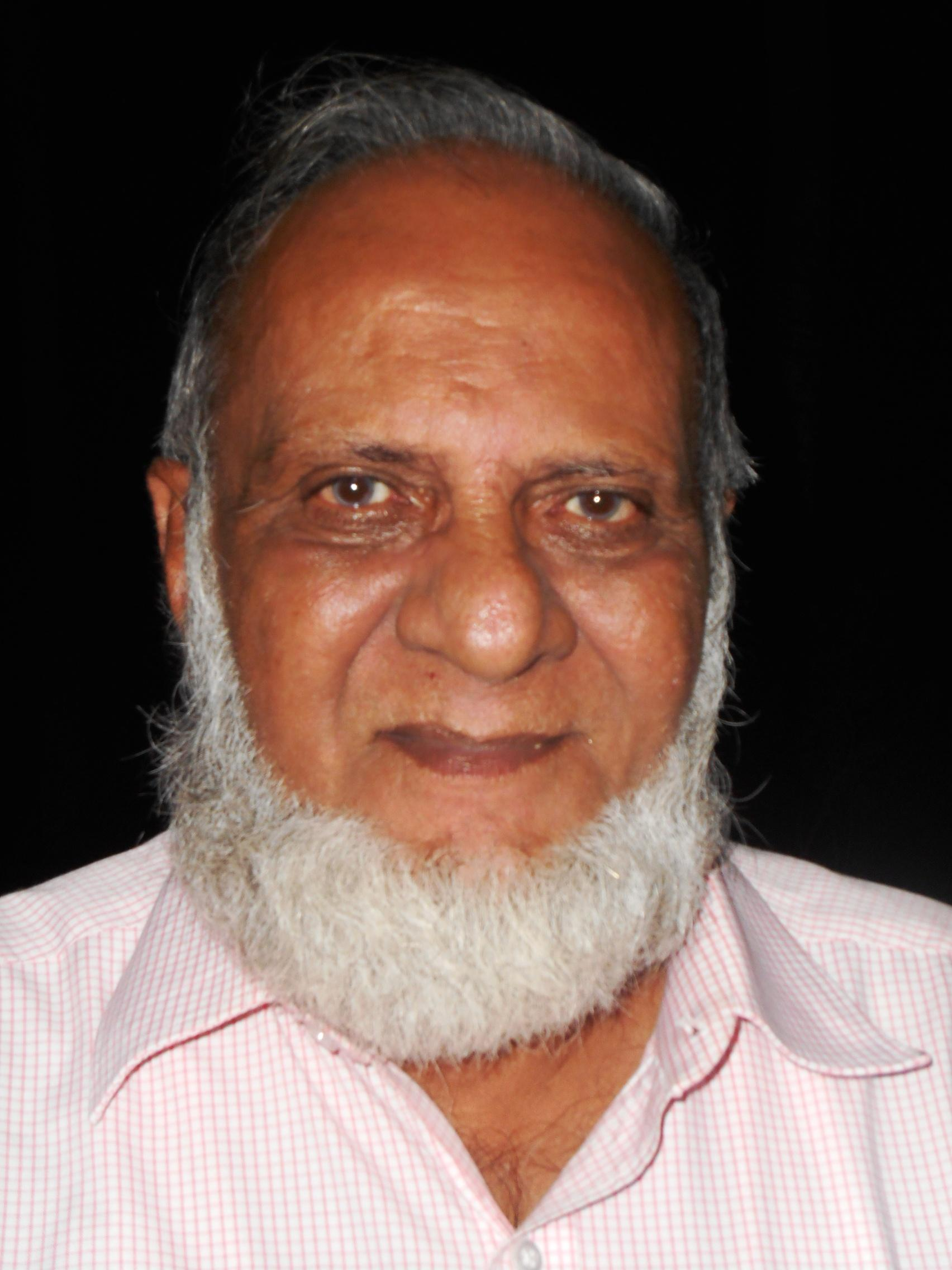

Deputy Minister of Foreign Affairs
- In office 2007–2010

Member of Parliament for National List
- In office 2004–2010

Personal details
- Born: 18 May 1949 (age 76)
- Party: All Ceylon Muslim Congress
- Other political affiliations: United People's Freedom Alliance
- Spouse: Bilkis
- Children: Nadeem, Kadeem, Asil
- Ethnicity: Sri Lankan Memon

Hussain Ahamed Bhaila (born 18 May 1949) is a Sri Lankan politician, a former member of the Parliament of Sri Lanka and as former Deputy Minister of Plan Implementation in the Mahinda Rajapaksa cabinet.
