= H. R. Mithrapala =

Sri Lankan politician (1946–2019)

Hon. H. R. Mithrapala MP

Minister of Consumer Affairs
- In office 2007–2010

Deputy Minister of Livestock Development
- In office 2010 – 12 January 2015

Member of Parliament for Kegalle District
- In office 2004 – 26 June 2015
- Preceded by: Maheepala Herath

Personal details
- Born: March 15, 1946
- Died: September 18, 2019 (aged 73)
- Party: Sri Lanka Freedom Party
- Other political affiliations: United People's Freedom Alliance
- Education: Bandaranayake College, Gampaha
- Profession: Attorney-at-Law

H. R. Mithrapala (15 March 1946 – 18 September 2019) was a Sri Lankan politician, a member of the Parliament of Sri Lanka who represented the Sri Lanka Freedom Party (SLFP) from the Kegalle district. He also served as a government minister.

Mithrapala was also the SLFP Deraniyagala Organiser until his death. He was first elected to parliament in 1999.
