= Alawwe Nandaloka Thera =

Sri Lankan politician

Hon. Alawwe Nandaloka MP

Member of Parliament for Gampaha District
- In office 2004–2010
- Preceded by: Kolonnawe Sri Sumangala

Personal details
- Party: Jathika Hela Urumaya
- Other political affiliations: United People's Freedom Alliance

Alawwe Nandaloka Thera is a Sri Lankan politician and a former member of the Parliament of Sri Lanka. He replaced elected official Kolonnawe Sri Sumangala, who resigned on 8 October 2004, six months after the Sri Lankan parliamentary election.
