= A. M. M. Naushad =

Sri Lankan politician (born 1958)

Hon. A. M. M. Naushad MP

Member of Parliament for Ampara District
- In office 2008–2010
- Preceded by: Rauff Hakeem

Personal details
- Born: Sammanthurai
- Party: Sri Lanka Freedom Party
- Other political affiliations: United People's Freedom Alliance
- Relations: M. I. M. Abdul Majeed (father)

Abdul Majeed Mohammed Naushad also known as Mohamed Naushad Majeed (born 1958) is a Sri Lankan politician and a former member of the Parliament of Sri Lanka.

== Biography ==
Naushad was born in Sammanthurai in the Eastern Province of Sri Lanka in 1954. He is the son of former Nintavur MP M. I. M. Abdul Majeed, and the son-in-law of former Deputy Minister and former Pottuvil MP M. A. Abdul Majeed. Pre-destined to enter politics, he began his political career in 1989 for the United National Party. He was the UNP's convener for the Eastern Province and a member of the UNP working committee. In 2001, he served as Deputy Secretary of the UNP. In this position, he created a problem for party leader Ranil Wickremasinghe when he stated his view that "his community came first and the party next".

Naoshaad left the UNP in 2001 after it formed an electoral alliance with the Sri Lanka Muslim Congress (SLMC). He then contested the 2001 parliamentary election from an independent group but failed to get elected.

Naoshaad later joined the SLMC and became a member of the SLMC High Command. At the 2004 parliamentary election, Naoshaad was a SLMC candidate in Ampara District but failed to get elected again after coming third amongst the SLMC candidates. However, Naushad entered Parliament in April 2008 following the resignation of SLMC leader Rauff Hakeem.

Following a meeting at Temple Trees, Naushad defected to the governing United People's Freedom Alliance (UPFA) during the 2010 parliamentary election campaign and became a member of the Sri Lanka Freedom Party. He was subsequently made a UPFA candidate in Ampara District but failed to get elected after coming in eighth amongst the UPFA candidates.
