= S. Nijamudeen =

Sri Lankan politician

Hon. Sihabdeen Nijamudeen MP

Member of Parliament for National List
- In office 2004–2010
- Preceded by: Mohammed Quddus

Personal details
- Party: Sri Lanka Muslim Congress (Democratic)
- Other political affiliations: United People's Freedom Alliance United National Party
- Spouse: Subaidha Abdul Raheem
- Children: Jaloodh, Jazeel, Jazeer, Jareen
- Profession: Politician, Lawyer

Sihabdeen Nijamudeen (sometimes Najamudeen Sihabdeen) (born in Eastern Sri Lanka) is a Sri Lankan politician and a former member of the Parliament of Sri Lanka.

Hon. Minister Sihabdeen Nijamudeen grew up in Sainthamaruthu on the country's east coast.

Sainthamaruthu is a commercial area under the Kalmunai Municipal Council. It comprises seventeen G.S. divisions and nine wards in the Municipal Council. There is a separate Divisional Secretary's Division, an M.P.C.S., a main post office and a fully equipped basic hospital for this area. The oldest market in this location had been turned into a modern market complex. There is also an Agriculture Productivity Centre to serve the farmers of this area. A separate educational circuit too established in this area very recently. The Kalmunai-Ampara (K.A.I.) main road passing through this area had become a busy commercial bazaar and the business turn over had multiplied rapidly

Sainthamaruthu is one of the olden villages which is situated in the eastern coast of Sri Lanka. This place is predominantly concentrated with a Tamil speaking Muslim population. It is also the heart of the Sri Lankan Muslim Congress which holds roughly 12000 votes which belongs to the SLMC political party. This is where the late leader Hon. MHM Ashraff was elected as a Member of Parliament then later he became the most dominant Muslim in Sri Lankan politics.
