= Thomas Thangathurai William =

Sri Lankan politician

Hon. Thomas Thangathurai William MP

Member of Parliament for Ampara District
- In office 2009–2010
- Preceded by: K. Pathmanathan, TNA

Personal details
- Party: Tamil National Alliance

Thomas Thangathurai William is a Sri Lankan Tamil politician and former Member of Parliament.

He represented the Ampara multi-member electoral district for the Tamil National Alliance (TNA) in the Sri Lankan Parliament between June 2009 and February 2010, having taken over from Kanagasabai Pathmanathan MP, who died in May 2009.

He was a TNA candidate for Ampara District at the 2010 parliamentary election but failed to get elected after coming third amongst the TNA candidates.
