= Raseen Mohammed Imam =

Sri Lankan Member of Parliament

Hon. Raseen Mohammed Imam MP

Member of Parliament for National List
- In office 2008–2010
- Preceded by: M.K. Eelaventhan, TNA

Personal details
- Party: Tamil National Alliance
- Profession: Lawyer

Raseen Mohammed Imam is a Sri Lankan politician and former Member of Parliament.

Imam was a National List MP for the Tamil National Alliance (TNA) in the Sri Lankan Parliament between February 2008 and February 2010, having taken over from M.K. Eelaventhan MP, who was expelled from Parliament in December 2007.

Imam was not selected as a TNA candidate for the 2010 parliamentary election.
