= P. Radhakrishnan (politician) =

Sri Lankan politician

Hon. Perumalpillai Radhakrishnan MP

Member of Parliament for National List
- In office 2001–2010

Personal details
- Born: 30 April 1941 (age 84)
- Party: Ceylon Workers Congress
- Other political affiliations: United People's Freedom Alliance / Up-Country People's Front
- Occupation: Vice President of the Ceylon Workers Congress

Perumalpillai Radhakrishnan (born 30 April 1941) was a Sri Lankan politician and the Deputy Minister for Vocational and Technical Training. Radhakrishnan served on the Consultative Committee on Religious Affairs and Moral Upliftment. He was also a member of a 5 persons special panel appointed by The President to look into the spate of kidnapping and murders during the height of the civil war.
