= C. Chandrakanthan =

Sri Lankan Tamil politician

Hon. C. Chandrakanthan MP

Member of Parliament for National List
- In office 2006–2010
- Preceded by: Joseph Pararajasingam

Personal details
- Born: 12 April 1970 (age 55)
- Party: Tamil National Alliance
- Occupation: Marine Officer

Chandranehru Chandrakanthan (Tamil: சந்திரநேரு சந்திரகாந்தன்; born 12 April 1970) is a Sri Lankan Tamil politician and former Member of Parliament.

== Early life and family ==
Chandrakanthan was born on 12 April 1970. He is the son of assassinated Tamil National Alliance (TNA) MP A. Chandranehru.

== Career ==
Chandrakanthan was appointed as a TNA National List MP in the Sri Lankan Parliament in September 2006, replacing Joseph Pararajasingam who had been assassinated in December 2005. He contested the 2010 parliamentary election as one of the TNA's candidates in Ampara District but failed to get elected after coming second amongst the TNA candidates.
