= Hasen Ali =

Sri Lankan politician (born 1945)

Hon. Hasen Ali MP
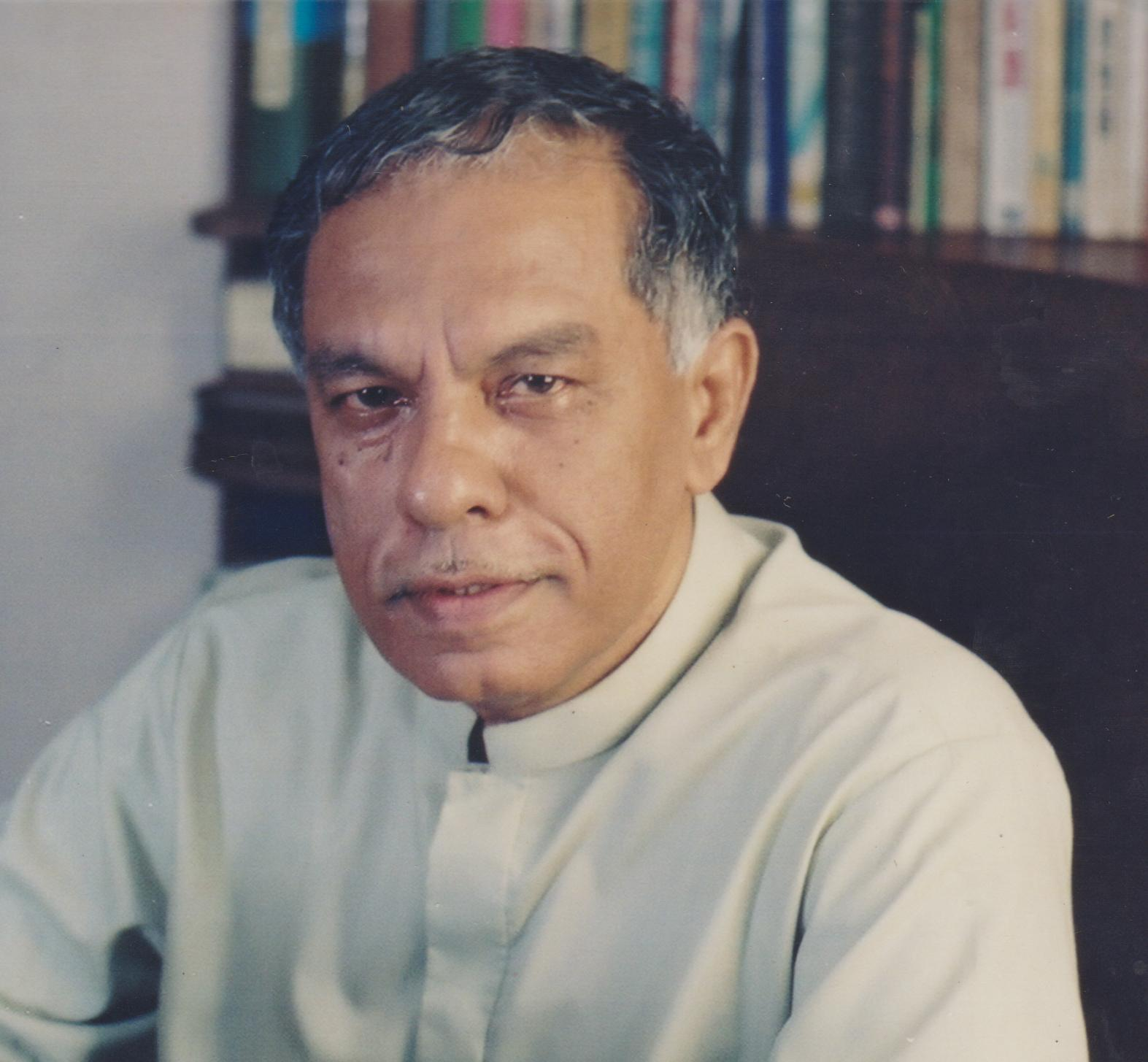
- Incumbent
- Assumed office 2003

Member of Parliament for National List
- In office 2008–2015
- In office 2004–2008

Member, Eastern Provincial Council
- In office 2008–2008

Personal details
- Born: 18 May 1945 (age 80) Sri Lanka
- Party: Sri Lanka Muslim Congress
- Other political affiliations: United National Front
- Profession: Engineer

Mohammed Thambi Hasen Ali (Hasan Ali) is a Sri Lankan politician and a member of the Parliament of Sri Lanka.

In January 2003 Ali was elected secretary general of the Sri Lanka Muslim Congress (SLMC).

Ali was appointed as the SLMC's National List MP in the Sri Lankan Parliament in April 2004. He resigned from Parliament in April 2008 to contest the Eastern Provincial Council elections. He was subsequently elected to EPC from Ampara district but resigned in July 2008. He was then reappointed as SLMC's National List MP.

Ali was appointed a United National Front National List MP in April 2010.
