= Solomon Cyril =

Sri Lankan politician

Hon. Solomon Cyril MP

Member of Parliament for Jaffna District
- In office 2008–2010
- Preceded by: K. Sivanesan, TNA

Personal details
- Born: August 14, 1942 (age 83)
- Occupation: Government Servant, ret'd

Solomon Soosaipillai Cyril is a Sri Lankan Tamil politician and former Member of Parliament.

== Political career ==
At the April 2004 parliamentary election Cyril was a candidate in Jaffna District but failed to get elected. However, Cyril entered Parliament in April 2008 following the murder of K. Sivanesan MP in March 2008.

Cyril was not selected as a Tamil National Alliance candidate for the April 2010 parliamentary election.
