= Mohamed Musthaffa =

Sri Lankan politician (1952–2023)

Hon. Mohamed Musthaffa MP

Deputy Minister of Higher Education
- In office 2007–2010

Member of Parliament for National List
- In office 2001–2004
- In office 2004–2010
- Preceded by: Seyed Ali Zahir Moulana

Personal details
- Born: July 28, 1952
- Died: 26 September 2023 (aged 71)

Meera Mohideen Mohamed Musthaffa, also known as Myown Musthaffa (28 July 1952 – 26 September 2023), was a Sri Lankan politician, a former member of the Parliament of Sri Lanka and a former government minister.

Musthaffa stood as an independent candidate in the 2010 presidential election and came 17th out of 22 candidates after receiving 3,134 votes (0.03%).

== Trial and conviction ==
Colombo High Court fixed the dates for the trial against Musthaffa in 2012. He was charged for offering LKR4.2 million to Mohamed Mussammil to support Sarath Fonseka in the 2010 presidential election. The verdict of the trial was delivered after a 13-years long trial in February 2023. Musthaffa was imprisoned for six months and his civil rights were suspended for seven years.

== Death ==
Musthaffa died on 26 September 2023 in his residence in Kirulapana.
