= Upcountry National Front =

Sri Lankan political party

Upcountry National Front කඳුරට ජාතික පෙරමුණ மலையக தேசிய முன்னணி
- Leader: Rishi Senthil Raj
- Secretary: S. Sivatharshini
- Headquarters: 86 Dunbar Road, Hatton, Hatton
- Youth wing: Upcountry National Front Youth Front
- National affiliation: Upcountry National Front
- Colors

Website
- https://www.unfparty.com/

The Upcountry National Front (Sinhala: කඳුරට ජාතික පෙරමුණ, romanized: Upcountry National Front; Tamil: மலையக தேசிய முன்னணி, romanized: Upcountry National Front) is a Sri Lankan political party. The party's current leader is Dr. Rishi Senthil Raj and the secretary is S. Sivatharshini.

== History ==
=== Upcountry National Front ===
The Upcountry National Front was founded in Colombo on 20 May 2000. Its founder was Dr. Rishi Senthil Raj. Its trade union division was launched in 2004. The party has contested all the elections since 2004 and gained membership. Founded by its founder leader Rishi Senthil Raj in the early days it was named as the “Workers Liberation Front”. Its political wing was led by party leader and Ayyadurai led the trade union wing.

In 2004, Santhanam Arulsamy and Palani Digambaran, who split from the Upcountry People's Front, won two seats in the provincial council and became the provincial council education minister. In 2006, the party won 22 Pradeshiya Sabha members in a coalition in all areas of the hill country. Thikambaram left the party after a conflict of opinion between the Minister of Education and Dikambaram in the Provincial Council. Following the defeat in the ensuing elections, Education Minister Arul Sami left the party.

In 2013, the party renamed the "Workers Liberation Front" as the "Upcountry National Front". In 2013, the coalition formed a coalition with the Upcountry National Alliance (UPFA) and secured a provincial council seat in the Nuwara Eliya district. In 2014, Ayyadurai withdrew from the party and joined another union.

Significantly, Maithripala Sirisena's victory in the 2015 presidential election was a major factor in the national campaign of President Maithripala Sirisena's victory in the presidential election of 2015. It was because all the other upstart parties in the hill country had joined hands with the government. Since then, the Upcountry National Front has contributed to the success of the Tamil Progressive Alliance in the 2015 parliamentary election.

Upcountry National Front withdrew its support to the government and in November 2015 the Upcountry National Front Alliance, together with the Sri Lanka Podujana Peramuna joined the joint opposition.
