= Joseph Pararajasingham =

Sri Lankan politician

Hon. Maamanithar Joseph Pararajasingham
- யோசப் பரராஜசிங்கம்

Member of Parliament for Batticaloa District
- In office 1990–2004
- Preceded by: Sam Tambimuttu

Member of Parliament for National List
- In office 2004–2005
- Succeeded by: C. Chandrakanthan

Personal details
- Born: 26 November 1934 Manipay, Ceylon
- Died: 25 December 2005 (aged 71) Batticaloa, Sri Lanka
- Party: Illankai Tamil Arasu Kachchi
- Other political affiliations: Tamil National Alliance

Joseph Pararajasingham (Tamil: யோசப் பரராஜசிங்கம்; 26 November 1934 – 25 December 2005) was a Sri Lankan Tamil civil servant, journalist, businessman and politician. He was Member of Parliament for Batticaloa District from 1990 to 2004 and a National List Member of Parliament from 2004 to 2005. A member of the Tamil National Alliance, he was shot dead on Christmas Day 2005 as he attended midnight mass at St. Mary's Cathedral, Batticaloa.

== Early life and family ==
Pararajasingham was born 26 November 1934 in Manipay in northern Ceylon. His family moved to Batticaloa when he was three years old. Pararajasingham was educated at St. Michael's College National School where he played football and basketball and was an athlete, representing the school in the high jump.

Pararajasingham married Sugunam David, whose family were originally from the Thondamanaru area of Vadamarachchi, in 1956. On their wedding day they took part in a protest against the Sinhala Only Act. Two of Sugunam's first cousins, P. R. Selvanayagam and Nimalan Soundaranayagam, were also Members of Parliament. Pararajasingham and Sugunam had three sons (Subaraj, Subakanth and Subajith) and one daughter (Subodini). Subaraj died in the 1980s, Subakanth and Subodini live in Canada and Subajith lives in the UK.

A Catholic, Pararajasingham was known as P. Joseph for most of his life. Only after entering politics did he give more emphasis to his Tamil name Pararajasingham over his Christian name Joseph.

== Career ==
Pararajasingham joined Batticaloa Kachcheri in the mid-1950s as a tracer in the Land Commissioner's Department. Pararajasingham was a staunch supporter of Illankai Tamil Arasu Kachchi (ITAK), commonly known as Federal Party, and at the 1970 parliamentary election he and his wife supported ITAK candidate C. Rajadurai rather than their relative P. R. Selvanayagam who was contesting as an independent candidate. Rajadurai and Selvanayagam were both elected but soon after the election Selvanayagam started supporting the Sri Lanka Freedom Party-led government. Selvanayagam took revenge on Pararajasingham by trying to have him transferred from Batticaloa Kachcheri to Nuwara Eliya Kachcheri. Pararajasingham chose instead to retire under the provisions of the Official Languages Act.

After retirement Pararajasingham tried to operate several businesses including mineral water manufacturing and wholesale paper sales. He then became manager of the Rajeswara Theatre. He subsequently bought the Imperial Theatre and renamed it Subaraj Theatre after his late son. He also owned the Subaraj Inn tourist lodge and Subaraj Shopping Complex in Batticaloa.

Pararajasingham also worked as a freelance journalist, initially writing for the Suthanthiran owned by S. J. V. Chelvanayakam, leader of ITAK. He then worked as the Batticaloa correspondent for Independent Newspapers, writing for Dinapathi and Chinthamini. Whilst working for the government his articles were credited to his wife Sugunam Joseph but after retirement he wrote under his own name, P. Joseph. He also wrote for the Sun and the Weekend. Pararajasingham was president of the East Ceylon Journalists' Association.

Pararajasingham was an active social worker - he was secretary of the Parents' Association and the Batticaloa Red Cross Society.

=== Politics ===
Pararajasingham joined the ITAK in 1956. On 14 May 1972 the ITAK, All Ceylon Tamil Congress, Ceylon Workers' Congress, Eelath Thamilar Otrumai Munnani and All Ceylon Tamil Conference formed the Tamil United Front, later renamed Tamil United Liberation Front (TULF). Pararajasingham was a member of TULF from the beginning and was joint secretary of its Batticaloa branch. In the mid/late 1980s Pararajasingham filed over 1,000 petitions on behalf of people detained under the Prevention of Terrorism Act.

Pararajasingham was one of the ENDLF/EPRLF/TELO/TULF alliance's candidates in Batticaloa District at the 1989 parliamentary election but failed to get elected after coming fifth amongst the alliance candidates. However, he entered Parliament in 1990 following the assassination of Sam Tambimuttu on 7 May 1990. The early 1990s were a difficult period for the civilian population of eastern Sri Lanka, caught in the middle of fighting between the militant Liberation Tigers of Tamil Eelam and the Sri Lankan military. There was rampant human rights abuses by the military and police. Batticaloa District witnessed many massacres including Kokkadichcholai and Mylanthanai. Many people turned to Pararajasingham for help. Pararajasingham would telephone, fax and write to ministers, civil servants, the military and the police to seek assistance for the civilians. When Pararajasingham took up the case of Murugesapillai Koneswary, who had been gang raped and murdered by the police, an enraged police officer "summoned" Pararajasingham, a Member of Parliament.

Pararajasingham was re-elected at the 1994 and 2000 parliamentary elections. He was made leader of the TULF parliamentary group in 1994. On 20 October 2001 the All Ceylon Tamil Congress, Eelam People's Revolutionary Liberation Front, Tamil Eelam Liberation Organization and TULF formed the Tamil National Alliance (TNA). Pararajasingham contested the 2001 parliamentary election as one of the TNA's candidates in Batticaloa District. He was elected and re-entered Parliament. He was appointed senior vice president of the TULF in June 2002. He failed to get re-elected at the 2004 parliamentary election after coming sixth amongst the TNA candidates. However, after the election he was appointed as a TNA National List MP in Parliament.

Pararajasingham and others founded NESOHR (North East Secretariat on Human Rights) on 9 July 2004. He was an executive member of the Commonwealth Parliamentary Association and the SAARC Parliamentary Association.

== Assassination ==
In late 2005 the police warned Pararajasingham of a plot to kill him and as a result he avoided going to Batticaloa unless it was necessary. However, on Christmas Eve 2005 Pararajasingham and Sugunam travelled from Colombo to Batticaloa along with two police bodyguards. Pararajasingham wanted to attend the midnight mass at St. Mary's Cathedral, Batticaloa being given by Bishop Kingsley Swampillai but a worried Sugunam suggested that they attend mass on Christmas morning. However, Pararajasingham insisted that they go that night. The only people who knew of the Pararajasinghams' decision to attend midnight mass were their police bodyguards. That evening, at around 10.30pm, they arrived at St. Mary's Cathedral but on finding the cathedral deserted they left, only to return later with Robin, Sugunam's brother, and his family.

A group of men in military clothing arrived at the nearby St. Anthony's Church and changed into civilian dress. They entered St. Mary's Cathedral through a side entrance at the front of the cathedral. It was around 1.10am on Christmas Day and Pararajasingham was receiving Holy Communion from the Bishop. The group of men started moving towards the altar. As Pararajasingham returned to his pew the men started firing, causing the congregation, including the Bishop, to dive to the floor. Pararajasingham was killed on the spot and seven others, including Sugunam, were injured. The gunmen exited the cathedral down the aisle, firing their guns into the air. Some eyewitnesses reported that the gunmen left in a rickshaw and headed towards the Patpodi camp, an old tooth powder factory used by the government-backed Karuna Group/TMVP paramilitary group.

A few weeks prior to the assassination Pararajasingham's experienced police bodyguards had been replaced. On the night of the assassination five of Pararajasingham's new police bodyguards were waiting outside the cathedral but none of them challenged the gunmen. The police bodyguards claimed that they didn't want to fire inside the cathedral in case they hit the worshippers. However, the police bodyguards didn't even fire at the gunmen even after they had exited the cathedral and were making their getaway. The police bodyguards also refused to take Pararajasingham and the injured to hospital. Pararajasingham was taken to hospital by a nephew whilst Sugunam was taken by a niece. Prior to the shooting, when worshippers were entering the cathedral they noticed that the surrounding area was teeming with security personnel. However, after the shooting, when worshippers left the cathedral the area was deserted - there were no security personnel.

It is widely believed that the assassination was sanctioned by the Sri Lankan government/military and carried out by the government-backed Karuna Group/TMVP paramilitary group. An unknown group calling itself Sennan Padai (Sennan Force) claimed responsibility for the attack and ordered other TNA MPs from the Eastern Province to resign or face execution. Sennan Padai's leaflets were distributed by the Sri Lankan military. Anti-LTTE websites such as the Asian Tribune gave prominence to the statements by Sennan Padai and Seerum Padai (Hissing Force) and started a campaign to vilify Pararajasingham.

On 25 December 2005 the LTTE conferred the title Maamanithar (great human being) on Pararajasingham. Sugunam was only told of Pararajasingham's death on the day of his funeral. Pararajasingham was buried at the family plot in Aalaiyadicholai burial grounds, Batticaloa on 29 December 2005.

A few weeks after the assassination Sugunam was given a visitor visa by Canada where her son and daughter were living as Canadian citizens. In 2007 she applied for refugee status. In July 2009 an Immigration and Refugee Board hearing began and in February 2011 the adjudicator ruled that Sugunam was a "terrorist" and ordered her deportation. However, as of March 2014 she remained in Canada.

Shortly after the assassination TNA MPs gave the name of the three suspected assassins, including Kaluthavalai Ravi and Kalai, to President Mahinda Rajapaksa but no action was taken against them. In July 2006 two suspects were arrested but, after a failed identity parade in August 2006, both were released due to "lack of evidence".

Following the defeat of Rajapaksa at the presidential election in January 2015, the new government announced that it would re-investigate several unsolved high-profile assassinations, including that of Pararajasingham, which occurred during Rajapaksa's nine-year reign. Two TMVP paramilitaries, Pradeep Master (Edwin Silva Krishnanandaraja) and Gajan Maamaa (Rangasami Kanaganayagam), were arrested by the Criminal Investigation Department (CID) on 8 October 2015 in connection with Pararajasingham's assassination. Pillayan (S. Chandrakanthan), leader of the TMVP, was also arrested by the CID, on 11 October 2015, in connection with the assassination.

== Electoral history ==
Electoral history of Joseph Pararajasingham
| Election | Constituency | Party | Votes | Result |
|---|---|---|---|---|
| 1989 parliamentary | Batticaloa District | TULF | 12,470 | Not elected |
| 1994 parliamentary | Batticaloa District | TULF | 43,350 | Elected |
| 2000 parliamentary | Batticaloa District | TULF | 12,605 | Elected |
| 2001 parliamentary | Batticaloa District | TNA | 20,279 | Elected |
| 2004 parliamentary | Batticaloa District | TNA | 24,940 | Not elected |
