= Mohamed Mussammil =

Sri Lankan politician

Hon. Mohamed Mussammil MP
- முகமது முஸம்மில் මොහොමඩ් මුසම්මිල්

Member of Parliament for National List
- In office 20 August 2020 – 24 September 2024
- In office 2004–2010
- Preceded by: Philipps Kumarasinghe Sri Liyanage

Personal details
- Born: 7 September 1980 (age 45)
- Party: National Freedom Front
- Other political affiliations: Supreme Lanka Coalition (since 2022); Sri Lanka People's Freedom Alliance (2019–2022); United People's Freedom Alliance (2004–2019)

Mohamed Mussammil (Mohamadu Mohidin Musammil Mohidi) is a Sri Lankan politician and former member of a Parliament of Sri Lanka.
