= M. K. Eelaventhan =

Sri Lankan Tamil politician

Hon. M. K. Eelaventhan MP

Member of Parliament for National List
- In office 2004–2007
- Succeeded by: Raseen Mohammed Imam

Personal details
- Born: M. K. Kanagentran; 14 September 1932
- Died: 28 April 2024 (aged 91) Canada
- Party: Tamil Eelam Liberation Front
- Other political affiliations: Tamil National Alliance
- Education: St. John's College, Jaffna; Wesley College, Colombo

Manicavasagar Kanagasabapathy Eelaventhan (born M. K. Kanagentran, 14 September 1932 – 28 April 2024) was a Sri Lankan Tamil politician who was a Member of Parliament.

== Background ==
Kanagentran was born on 14 September 1932. He was the son of Kanagasabapathy, a station master from Nallur in northern Ceylon. He was educated at St. John's College, Jaffna and Wesley College, Colombo.

Eelaventhan died in Canada on 28 April 2024, at the age of 91.

== Career ==
Kanagentran worked at the Central Bank of Ceylon, eventually becoming head of the Tamil translation section in the Economic Research Department before retiring in 1980.

Kanagentran was an active member of the Illankai Tamil Arasu Kachchi (ITAK) but in 1970 joined V. Navaratnam's Tamil Self Rule Party. He later re-joined ITAK, which was now part of the Tamil United Liberation Front (TULF). Kanagentran was president of the TULF's Colombo branch. He was a victim of the 1977 riots. He became a high profile advocate of Tamil Eelam and changed his name to Eelaventhan which means "King of Eelam" in Tamil. In 1980 he and others left ITAK to form the Tamil Eelam Liberation Front (TELF). Eelaventhan was TELF's secretary.

With the escalation of violence Eelaventhan, like many Sri Lankan Tamil politicians, moved to Tamil Nadu in 1981. He and four others were arrested in Madras in February 1997 on charges of procuring medicine for the Liberation Tigers of Tamil Eelam. All five were acquitted in August 1999. Eelaventhan was deported to Sri Lanka on 4 December 2000.

Eelaventhan was appointed a Tamil National Alliance National List MP in the Sri Lankan Parliament following the 2004 parliamentary election. He forfeited his seat in Parliament in November 2007 for being absent for more than three months.

Eelaventhan emigrated to Canada where in May 2010 he was elected to the Transnational Constituent Assembly of Tamil Eelam.
