= Joint Opposition (Sri Lanka) =

Joint Opposition ඒකාබද්ධ විපක්ෂය கூட்டு எதிர்ப்பு
- Chairperson: Dinesh Gunawardena
- Founded: 2015
- Dissolved: 2019
- Succeeded by: Sri Lanka Podujana Peramuna
- Ideology: Anti-federalism; Anti-imperialism; Sinhalese nationalism Social democracy Right-wing populism
- Political position: Right-wing
- National affiliation: United People's Freedom Alliance

Website
- www.upfa.lk

The Joint Opposition (Sinhala: ඒකාබද්ධ විපක්ෂය, romanized: Ekabadda Vipakshaya; Tamil: கூட்டு எதிர்ப்பு, romanized: Kuttu Etiruppu) was a political alliance formed by a faction of the Sri Lanka Freedom Party (SLFP) alongside several smaller quasi-left-wing parties of Sri Lanka. Between 2015 and 2019, it was the largest opposition group in the Parliament of Sri Lanka, and at its maximum extent the alliance had 52 MPs.

The alliance was formed after the two major parties of Sri Lanka, the SLFP and the United National Party (UNP), formed a national unity government, leading to a great degree of discontent amongst many SLFP members (many of whom were loyal to former president Mahinda Rajapaksa), who then went on to form the Joint Opposition alongside other parties from the United People's Freedom Alliance (UPFA). The alliance aimed to give voice to the mandate voters provided for the UPFA at the 2015 general election, which many loyal SLFP members felt the party had abandoned when it joined the UNP-led government.

The organization largely consisted of Mahinda Rajapaksa loyalists and was very critical of the administration of President Maithripala Sirisena and Prime Minister Ranil Wickremesinghe. The alliance also prominently included individuals outside parliament such as D. E. W. Gunasekera and G. L. Peiris, who were denied parliamentary seats due to President Sirisena's decision to appoint defeated loyalists into parliament through the National List. The Joint Opposition was led by Mahajana Eksath Peramuna leader Dinesh Gunawardena. The Sri Lanka Podujana Peramuna, founded in 2016 and currently led by Rajapaksa, can be considered to be the alliance's spiritual successor.

== Constituent parties ==
- Sri Lanka Freedom Party (Rajapaksa faction)
- Lanka Sama Samaja Party
- Upcountry National Front
- Mahajana Eksath Peramuna
- Democratic Left Front
- National Freedom Front
- Pivithuru Hela Urumaya
