= Mylanthanai massacre =

Massacre in Mylanthanai

- Location: Mylanthanai, Batticaloa, Sri Lanka
- Date: August 9, 1992 (+6 GMT)
- Target: Sri Lankan Tamil village residents
- Attack type: Armed massacre
- Weapons: Automatics rifles, Knives, axes
- Deaths: 35
- Perpetrator: Sri Lankan Army

The Mylanthanai massacre happened on August 9, 1992 when 35 minority Sri Lankan Tamils, including 14 children, at Mylanthanai in Batticaloa District in Sri Lanka, were killed.

Sri Lankan Army soldiers from an army camp in Punanai were initially accused of the crime, but they were acquitted by the unanimous verdict of a jury in Colombo.

== Incident ==
On August 9, 1992 according to the government prosecutor Sri Lankan Army soldiers attacked the village of Mylanthanai, after the army's commanding officer in Jaffna was killed along with seven soldiers in a landmine explosion earlier the same day. According to the pro-rebel Tamilnet reporting on the court proceedings, an eye witness Ms Sinnathurai Indrakala, 28 was quoted as saying that the soldiers had used guns, knives and axes to carry out the murders. Children as young as 1 to 15 were amongst the dead.

== Government investigation ==
The government reaction was swift, according to the Sri Lanka Monitor, a reporting organization in the ongoing Sri Lankan Civil War, a line-up was held at Batticaloa Magistrate’s Court on April 2, 1993. Survivors of the killings identified 24 soldiers.

The Attorney General at the time transferred the case to Polonnaruwa District. He then transferred the case again to Colombo on the grounds of safety for the accused. This arrangement made it difficult for witnesses who were survivors to appear. The indictment was filed in Colombo High Court in September 1999.

More than 30 eyewitnesses came from Batticaloa along with coroner who conducted most of the autopsies and the presiding regional judge. Eye witness accounts from dead persons were also allowed to be read in the case. After an extensive hearing the case went before the jury. The jury found the soldiers not guilty. The Judge requested the Jury to reconsider the verdict but the jury found the accused soldiers not guilty again. The attorney general turned down the request of the victims representatives to appeal.

== Controversy over acquittal ==
Human rights agencies and relatives of victims expressed shock after 18 soldiers accused in the Mylanthanai case were released on 27 November. A local Human Rights agency UTHR considered the jury's verdict unfair and reported that about the lack of expression of concern over the verdict among the international community.

According to Northeastern Herald, although the constitution provides room for appalling such cases, the Attorney General refused to appeal the verdict citing convention.

== See also ==
- List of attacks on civilians attributed to Sri Lankan government forces
