= Piyasiri Wijenayake =

Sri Lankan politician

Hon. Piyasiri Wijenayake MP

Member of Parliament for Kalutara District
- In office 2004–2010

Personal details
- Party: National Freedom Front
- Education: Taxila Central College, Horana

K. Piyasiri Wijenayake is a Sri Lankan politician and a former member of the Parliament of Sri Lanka.
