= United National Front (Sri Lanka) =

United National Front for Good Governance එක්සත් යහපාලන ජාතික පෙරමුණ நல்லாட்சிக்கான ஐக்கிய தேசிய முன்னணி
- Abbreviation: UNFGG
- Leader: Ranil Wickremesinghe
- Secretary General: Akila Viraj Kariyawasam
- Founded: October 2001 (as the United National Front); 5 July 2015 (as the United National Front for Good Governance)
- Dissolved: 2020
- Preceded by: United National Front
- Succeeded by: Samagi Jana Balawegaya (Sajith faction)
- Headquarters: 120A, Stafford Road, Colombo 06, Colombo, Sri Lanka
- Ideology: Conservatism
- Political position: Centre-right
- Colors: Green

Election symbol
- Elephant

The United National Front (UNF) (Sinhala: එක්සත් ජාතික පෙරමුණ), later the United National Front for Good Governance (UNFGG) (Sinhala: එක්සත් යහපාලන ජාතික පෙරමුණ Eksath Yahapalana Jathika Peramuna; Tamil: நல்லாட்சிக்கான ஐக்கிய தேசிய முன்னணி), was a political alliance in Sri Lanka led by the United National Party.

The UNF was the governing party of the Parliament of Sri Lanka from 2015 to 2020. The alliance once consisted of 7 parties, including the largest Muslim party in Sri Lanka, the Sri Lanka Muslim Congress, and the Sinhalese nationalist Jathika Hela Urumaya. Since 2020, however, the alliance has been rendered mostly nugatory, having only one national list seat in the parliament and the UNP being the only constituent party of the alliance.

== History ==
=== United National Front (2001–2015) ===
The UNF was formed as an alliance in 2001 to contest against the ruling SLFP-led People's Alliance led by president Chandrika Kumaratunga in the 2001 parliamentary elections. The alliance initially consisted of only the United National Party, the Ceylon Workers' Congress, the Sri Lanka Muslim Congress and the Western People's Front. The alliance won the election, securing 109 seats in the parliament, which was 4 seats short of a majority.

From October 2003 onwards, however, the UNF government had been in limbo, when president Kumaratunga declared a state of emergency and took three key cabinet portfolios for her party. During the campaign, Kumaratunga argued that prime minister Wickremesinghe had been too soft on the Liberation Tigers of Tamil Eelam and promised to take a harder stance against the Tamil rebel group. The UNF, on the other hand, stressed the economic gains that the country had made as a result of the ceasefire and the need to find a negotiated solution to the civil war. Eventually, Kumaratunga dissolved the parliament and called another election in 2004, in which the UNF lost to the newly formed United People's Freedom Alliance.

Following the UNF's defeat, many of the constituent parties subsequently crossed over from the UNF to the UPFA. In 2006, the CWC left the alliance to join UPFA. The UNP and SLMC together contested in the 2010 parliamentary election as the UNF and only secured 29.34% of the popular vote and 60 out of 225 seats. After the election, the SLMC left the UNF and joined the UPFA government of President Mahinda Rajapaksa.

=== United National Front for Good Governance (2015–2020) ===
The UNP has contested in parliamentary elections as part of a bigger alliance with smaller parties in the past before, but many of these parties would defect to the opposing party following the election. The United National Front was once again relaunched by the UNP as a common front against Mahinda Rajapaksa, who was defeated in the 2015 presidential elections. The UNF this time had the support of many parties such as the Jathika Hela Urumaya, the Sri Lanka Muslim Congress, and the Tamil National Alliance as a major coalition to support the common opposition candidate Maithripala Sirisena, a former member of the SLFP and minister in Rajapaksa's government before turning against Rajapaksa and formally running as a New Democratic Front candidate.

Prior to the election being called, the UNP had claimed it would contest in the election on its own. However, after the election had been called, the UNP instead began to form alliances with several minority parties, including the Sri Lanka Muslim Congress (SLMC) and the Tamil Progressive Alliance (TPA). Following the presidential election, the de facto electoral alliance between president Sirisena and the United National Front led to Sirisena appointing UNP leader Ranil Wickremesinghe as his prime minister, the day Sirisena was elected president.

On 12 July 2015, the UNP, SLMC and TPA signed agreements with the Jathika Hela Urumaya (JHU) and anti-Rajapaksa members of the SLFP to form the United National Front for Good Governance (UNFGG) to contest the parliamentary election. The All Ceylon Makkal Congress (ACMC) also contested with the UNFGG. Though the UNFGG was believed to have had the tacit support of president Sirisena, Sirisena officially pledged to remain neutral.

The UNFGG had originally been established by the renaming of the JHU after it left the UPFA. It was registered as a political party with the diamond symbol. Despite this, the UNFGG contested in the election under the name and elephant symbol of the UNP. Then-UNFGG general secretary Champika Ranawaka stated that the JHU name and its conch symbol will be revived after the election.

The UNFGG became the largest group in Parliament following the 2015 parliamentary elections, securing 45.66% of the vote and 106 seats, whilst the UPFA won only 42.38% of the vote and 95 seats. Rajapaksa quickly conceded defeat in his attempt to return to power and become prime minister. 42 members of the opposition subsequently joined the UNFGG government, giving them a 2/3 majority. The result left the UNFGG seven seats short of a majority in Parliament. However, on 20 August 2015, the central committee of the SLFP agreed to form a national government with the UNP which would last for two years. Wickremesinghe was sworn in as prime minister for another term on 21 August 2015. Immediately afterwards, a memorandum of understanding to work together in Parliament was signed by acting SLFP general secretary Duminda Dissanayake and UNP general secretary Kabir Hashim.

=== Samagi Jana Balawegaya and split ===
Prior to the 2020 parliamentary elections, the working committee of the UNP appointed opposition leader Sajith Premadasa as the leader of the new UNP-led alliance, the Samagi Jana Balawegaya (SJB), and selected Premadasa as the prime ministerial candidate of the SJB. UNP senior Ranjith Madduma Bandara was named as the new General Secretary of the alliance. The Jathika Hela Urumaya, Sri Lanka Muslim Congress and the Tamil Progressive Alliance also announced their support for the new alliance.

52 out of 77 UNP MPs joined the new alliance. On 14 February 2020, both Sajith Premadasa and Ranil Wickremesinghe agreed to contest in the elections under the swan symbol and file nominations under the Samagi Jana Balawegaya in an attempt to deescalate the ongoing threat of division within the United National Party. At the last minute, however, UNP leader Ranil Wickremesinghe withdrew from the SJB alliance, despite his previous approval of the alliance to contest. Despite Wickremesinghe's decision, the majority of the UNP signed nominations under the SJB. Approximately 75 members of parliament joined the alliance, while a minority faction of the UNP filed nominations under the elephant symbol.

The UNP suffered its worst defeat in history in the elections, receiving only 2.15% of votes cast. For the first time, the party failed to win a single seat in parliament, having only gained one national list seat.

== Members ==
United National Front

- United National Party (2001–2015)
- Ceylon Workers' Congress (2001–2004)
- Democratic People's Front (2001–2015)
- Sri Lanka Muslim Congress (2001–2015)
- Up-Country People's Front (2001–2015)
- Citizen's Front (2010–2015)
- National Union of Workers (2010–2015)

United National Front for Good Governance

- United National Party
- All Ceylon Makkal Congress
- Democratic National Movement
- Jathika Hela Urumaya
- Muslim Tamil National Alliance
- National Front for Good Governance
- Sri Lanka Muslim Congress
- Tamil Progressive Alliance
- * Democratic People's Front
- * National Union of Workers
- * Up-Country People's Front
- United Left Front
- Anti-Rajapaksa faction of the Sri Lanka Freedom Party

== Electoral history ==
Sri Lanka Parliamentary Elections
Election year	Votes	Vote %	Seats won	+/–	Result for the party
2001	4,086,026	45.62%	109 / 225	0	Government
2004	3,504,200	37.83%	82 / 225	▼27	Opposition
2010	2,357,057	29.34%	60 / 225	▼22	Opposition
2015	5,098,916	45.66%	106 / 225	▲49	Government (Note: The UNFGG led a National Unity government from 2015–18.)
2020	249,435	2.15%	1 / 225	▼105	Opposition (Note: Ranil Wickremesinghe, the sole elected UNFGG MP, would later join the SLPP-led government in 2022.)

== Leadership ==
=== Leader ===
Name	Portrait	Province	Term of office	Highest Position Held
Ranil Wickremesinghe		Western	2001–2020	Prime Minister

=== General secretaries ===
Name	Portrait	Province	Term of office	Highest Position Held
Tissa Attanayake		Central	2001–2015	Cabinet Minister
Champika Ranawaka		Western	2015–2020	Cabinet Minister

== See also ==
- United People's Freedom Alliance
