= United People's Freedom Alliance =

United People's Freedom Alliance එක්සත් ජනතා නිදහස් සන්ධානය ஐக்கிய மக்கள் சுதந்திரக் கூட்டணி
- Chairperson: Maithripala Sirisena
- Secretary: Thilanga Sumathipala
- Founder: Chandrika Kumaratunga
- Founded: 20 January 2004
- Dissolved: 9 December 2019
- Preceded by: People's Alliance
- Succeeded by: Sri Lanka People's Freedom Alliance
- Headquarters: 301 T. B. Jayah Mawatha, Colombo 10, Sri Lanka
- Youth wing: Nidahas Tharuna Peramuna
- Ideology: Social democracy
- Political position: Centre-left

Election symbol
- Betel Leaf

The United People's Freedom Alliance (UPFA; Sinhala: එක්සත් ජනතා නිදහස් සන්ධානය Eksath Janathā Nidahas Sandānaya; Tamil: ஐக்கிய மக்கள் சுதந்திரக் கூட்டணி) was a political alliance in Sri Lanka founded by former Sri Lankan president Chandrika Kumaratunga in 2004 and dissolved by former Sri Lankan President Maithripala Sirisena in 2019.

== History ==
The United People's Freedom Alliance was born out of a memorandum of understanding signed by the Sri Lanka Freedom Party (SLFP) and the Janatha Vimukthi Peramuna (JVP) in 2004. The agreement was the result of a year's negotiations between the two parties, and broadly outlined common goals in the areas of the economy, ethnic harmony, democracy, culture and foreign policy, areas in which the two parties shared common disagreements with the ruling UNP-led United National Front, which was in power at the time. The agreement did not go into specifics on how differences between the two parties would be resolved, particularly in the area of their differing visions of the solution to the country's ethnic problem. Fundamentally, the memorandum was used as a coalition declaration for the upcoming parliamentary elections, and was a revisiting of the unsuccessful coalition attempt before the 2001 parliamentary elections. The coalition was, in effect, an attempt to oust the ruling UNP based on negative public opinion of its handling of the Sri Lankan Civil War, both in terms of its approach to negotiating with the LTTE and a perceived free hand given to Western interference in the country's democracy through the Norwegian-led peace process. The name of the alliance is believed to have been heavily influenced by the JVP, who insisted it be named Eksath Janathā Nidahas Sandānaya (Sinhala: United People's Freedom Alliance) such that it preceded in the alphabetical order the Eksath Jāthika Pakshaya (Sinhala: United National Party) on the Sinhala ballot paper. The influence of the JVP (and later the Jathika Hela Urumaya) has been identified as one of the reasons for the nationalist leanings of the alliance.

A collection of left-leaning political parties then entered the alliance at various dates after January 2004 with memorandums of understanding of their own. These parties included the Sri Lanka Mahajana Pakshaya, Desha Vimukthi Janatha Pakshaya, Mahajana Eksath Peramuna, the National Congress Party, the Muslim National Unity Alliance, the Communist Party of Sri Lanka and the Lanka Sama Samaja Party. In the April 2004 election, the UPFA won 45.6% of the popular vote and 105 out of 225 seats, limiting the UNP to just 82 seats. Despite the Eelam People's Democratic Party's Douglas Devananda (the party's sole MP) joining the UPFA soon after the election, the alliance formed a minority government, lacking 7 seats for an outright majority. Three MPs from the Sri Lanka Muslim Congress defected to the UPFA on 9 August 2004, while the Ceylon Workers' Congress (CWC) joined the alliance on 3 September with eight sitting MPs, stabilizing the UPFA's position. One more CWC MP, Vadivel Suresh, crossed over on 14 December 2005. Nevertheless, the alliance faced difficulties exerting control or influence in parliament in its early days, notably during the vote for Speaker, where it was unable to get its own ranks to vote for a UPFA candidate.

The JVP broke away from the alliance on 16 June 2005 with its 39 MPs choosing to sit in opposition, citing differences with the SLFP leadership, particularly those stemming from Chandrika Kumaratunga's proposed Tsunami Relief Council (which the JVP had strongly opposed), and her appointment of Mahinda Rajapaksa as Prime Minister, an appointment that the JVP believed should have (and was promised would have) gone to Lakshman Kadirgamar. The breakaway was followed by a landmark Supreme Court ruling that declared that Kumaratunga's term in office would end on 21 December 2005, and ordered the Election Commission to hold presidential elections before November 2005. The breakaway notwithstanding, the UPFA contested the election on 17 November with Mahinda Rajapaksa as its candidate and party leader; Rajapaksa defeated UNP candidate Ranil Wickremesinghe with 50.29% of the vote. The 2005 election has since been plagued by accusations of manipulation, with opponents of Rajapaksa and the UPFA accusing Rajapakse of paying off the LTTE to force ethnic Tamils to boycott the election through its proxy the Tamil National Alliance, depriving Wickremesinghe of a key part of the UNP's electoral base.

Four further sets of defections to the UPFA took place between 2006 and 2008:

- 25 January 2006 – 2 United National Party MPs (Keheliya Rambukwella and Mahinda Samarasinghe)
- 28 January 2007 – 18 UNP MPs (Lakshman Yapa Abeywardena, Rohitha Bogollagama, P. Dayaratna, Dharmadasa Banda, Navin Dissanayake, Edward Gunasekara, Bandula Gunawardane, Karu Jayasuriya, Gamini Lokuge, M. H. Mohamed, Milinda Moragoda, Mohamed Musthaffa, Hemakumara Nanayakkara, Neomal Perera, G. L. Peiris, Rajitha Senaratne, C. A. Suriyaarachchi, Mano Wijeyeratne, and Mahinda Wijesekara) and 6 Sri Lanka Muslim Congress MPs. Four of the SLMC defectors (Hasen Ali, Cassim Faizal, Rauff Hakeem, and Basheer Segu Dawood) returned to the opposition on 12 December 2007.
- 30 January 2007 – 8 Jathika Hela Urumaya MPs
- 28 December 2008 – all 12 MPs of the JVP-breakaway National Freedom Front, led by Wimal Weerawansa.

In addition, the UPFA managed to gain control of eight of the nine Provincial Councils between 2008 and 2009, breaking away from the tradition of holding provincial elections on a single date, utilizing victories on the war front as part of their provincial election campaigns.

The end of the civil war in May 2009 is considered to have solidified the UPFA's hold on power. Mahinda Rajapaksa contested the presidential election again in January 2010 as the UPFA candidate, defeating the New Democratic Front's Sarath Fonseka, Rajapska's erstwhile ally and former Commander of the Sri Lanka Army. Fonseka and the NDF rejected the election result, while the Election Commission provided conflicting accounts of the transparency of the polls. The UPFA government denied the allegations and had Fonseka arrested and imprisoned on charges of treason and sedition.

Parliamentary elections were held in April 2010, and was won by the UPFA again with a 45.60% share of the vote (105/225 seats). The alliance was not able to realize its campaign goal of a two-thirds majority (required for constitutional reform), however, although a subsequent series of opposition defections helped the alliance gain this majority and push through several constitutional amendments, including the removal of presidential term limits. The UPFA administration initiated several infrastructure developments between 2010 and 2015, including the country's first expressway network and the beautification of Colombo.

Deepening rifts within the Sri Lanka Freedom Party emerged during Rajapaksa's presidency, culminating in SLFP General Secretary and Minister of Health Maithripala Sirisena defecting from the UPFA on 21 November 2014 to contest the 2015 presidential elections as part a candidate of the UNP-led New Democratic Front. The defection resulted in a loss of power for the UPFA in parliament, as several others followed Sirisena to the opposition. Sirisena won the prematurely-called election with a 51.28% majority, and appointed UNP leader Ranil Wickremesinghe as the prime minister of a transitional coalition government dominated by the UNP and supported by Sirisena loyalists in the SLFP and UPFA, while the faction of Rajapaksa loyalists decided to sit in the opposition. Sirisena's victory resulted in Rajapaksa handing over the chairmanship of the SLFP to Sirisena on 16 January, while the UPFA Central Committee voted unanimously to appoint Sirisena as leader of the UPFA on 16 March 2015.

Parliament was dissolved by Sirisena in June 2015 for fresh parliamentary elections. At the election, the party won 95 seats (42.38%, down nearly 20% from the previous election) and signed a memorandum of understanding with the United National Party four days later on 21 August, forming a national government. The MoU cited economic development, ensuring freedom and democracy (particularly through implementation of the 19th amendment enacted by the short-lived transitional government), reduction of corruption, development of the health and education sectors, improving foreign relations, securing the rights of women and children, support and development of the arts and culture, and general mutual cooperation between the UPFA and UNP for a period of two years. On 9 February, the Rajapaksa faction (consisting of 52 of the 95 UPFA MPs elected) formed an informal coalition named the Joint Opposition and sat in the opposition acting as an independent faction of the UPFA, citing, among other factors, Sirisena's defection and cooperation with the UNP as a betrayal to core SLFP/UPFA voters and principles. The MoU was allowed to lapse in April 2017 and was not renewed; senior UPFA members have cited the results of the bond issuance scam investigation as being a key point of contention between the two political entities and a central determinant of future collaboration with the UNP.

== Policies ==
UPFA states on its Facebook page that it "stand[s] for Social Justice, Good Governance, Human Rights, Freedom of Education & Expression, Right for Information and above all Freedom on Social Media in Sri Lanka". The only two languages used on its Facebook page were English and Sinhalese.

=== Overview ===
Major policy issues
| Policy | Description |
|---|---|
| Women | The alliance had few female lawmakers but was generally supportive of expanding women's rights. |
| LGBT | The alliance appointed the first transgender governor of the island in modern history; however, it remained restrained in its support of LGBT matters and blocked a motion to erase Section 375a from law. |
| Tamils | The UPFA used only English and Sinhalese on its Facebook page. It has stated that it preferred "to retain the unitary state of Sri Lanka". |

== Youth wing ==
The UPFA had no formal youth wing, utilizing the Sri Lanka Freedom Party's youth wing as its main organization for youth outreach, with constituent parties using their own youth organizations. In 2010, Namal Rajapaksa founded the Nil Balakaya (Blue Brigade) as a united youth organization for the alliance, incorporating the SLFP youth front and envisioning a supporting role targeting the 2010 presidential election in particular. The Nil Balakaya has been the subject of controversy, being accused of civil disturbances, intimidation and abuse of power; as such, the body was dissolved by the Sirisena unity government in February 2015, and the SLFP youth wing renamed the Nidahas Tharuna Peramuna (Free Youth Front), returning to its pre-2010 status as the chief youth outreach organ of the alliance.

== Member parties ==
The following parties were part of the United People's Freedom Alliance at its dissolution:

- Sri Lanka Freedom Party
- Sri Lanka Mahajana Pakshaya
- Ceylon Workers' Congress
- Communist Party of Sri Lanka
- Desha Vimukthi Janatha Pakshaya
- Democratic Left Front
- Eelam People's Democratic Party
- Eelavar Democratic Front
- Mahajana Eksath Peramuna
- National Freedom Front
- Tamil Makkal Viduthalai Pulikal
- Sri-TELO (Uthayan faction)

== Leadership ==
=== Leaders ===
- Chandrika Kumaratunga (20 January 2004 – 19 November 2005)
- Mahinda Rajapaksa (20 November 2005 – 13 March 2015)
- Maithripala Sirisena (14 March 2015 – 9 December 2019)

=== General secretaries ===
- Susil Premajayanth (20 January 2004 – 14 August 2015)
- Wiswa Warnapala (14 August 2015 – 27 February 2016)
- Mahinda Amaraweera (8 March 2016 – 22 November 2022)
- Thilanga Sumathipala (30 November 2022 – present)

== Electoral history ==
Sri Lanka parliamentary elections
| Election year | Votes | Vote % | Seats won | +/– | Government |
|---|---|---|---|---|---|
| 2004 | 4,223,970 | 45.60% | 105 / 225 | ▲105 | Government |
| 2010 | 4,846,388 | 60.33% | 144 / 225 | ▲39 | Government |
| 2015 | 4,732,664 | 42.38% | 95 / 225 | ▼49 | Government/Opposition (Note: Part of the alliance joined the National Unity government led by the United National Party, while the rest stayed in the opposition) |

Sri Lanka presidential elections
| Election year | Candidate | Votes | Vote % | Result |
|---|---|---|---|---|
| 2005 | Mahinda Rajapaksa | 4,887,152 | 50.29% | Won |
| 2010 | Mahinda Rajapaksa | 6,015,934 | 57.88% | Won |
| 2015 | Mahinda Rajapaksa | 5,768,090 | 47.58% | Lost (Note: Even though Rajapaksa was defeated, the winner Sirisena was a member of the Sri Lanka Freedom Party and subsequently became the UPFA chairman) |
