= Kalkudah Polling Division =

Kalkudah
- Polling Division
- Coordinates: 8.068115°N 81.416132°E
- Country: Sri Lanka
- Province: Eastern Province, Sri Lanka
- Electoral District: Batticaloa Electoral District

Area
  - Total: 1,080.3 km^{2} (417.1 sq mi)

Population (2012)
  - Total: 118,925
  - Density: 110/km^{2} (280/sq mi)
- ISO 3166 code: EC-12A

The Kalkudah Polling Division is a Polling Division in the Batticaloa Electoral District, in the Eastern Province, Sri Lanka.

== Presidential Election Results ==
=== Summary ===
The winner of Kalkudah has matched the final country result 4 out of 8 times.

Year	Kalkudah	Batticaloa Electoral District	MAE %	Sri Lanka	MAE %
2019	NDF	NDF	3.16%	SLPP	31.61%
2015	NDF	NDF	2.02%	NDF	32.45%
2010	NDF	NDF	7.92%	UPFA	21.90%
2005	UNP	UNP	8.75%	UPFA	22.18%
1999	UNP	UNP	12.21%	PA	4.76%
1994	PA	PA	0.18%	PA	25.62%
1988	UNP	UNP	4.84%	UNP	11.72%
1982	UNP	UNP	15.38%	UNP	5.56%
Matches/Mean MAE	4/8	4/8	6.81%	8/8	19.48%

=== 2019 Sri Lankan Presidential Election ===
Party	Kalkudah		Batticaloa Electoral District		Sri Lanka	
Party	Votes	%	Votes	%	Votes	%
NDF	65,847	75.96%	238,649	78.70%	5,564,239	41.99%
SLPP	16,663	19.22%	38,460	12.68%	6,924,255	52.25%
Other Parties (with < 1%)	4,182	4.82%	26,112	8.61%	764,005	5.76%
Valid Votes	86,692	98.95%	303,221	98.62%	13,252,499	98.99%
Rejected Votes	924	1.05%	4,258	1.38%	135,452	1.01%
Total Polled	87,616	77.08%	307,479	77.20%	13,387,951	83.71%
Registered Electors	113,665		398,301		15,992,568	

=== 2015 Sri Lankan Presidential Election ===
Party	Kalkudah		Batticaloa Electoral District		Sri Lanka	
Party	Votes	%	Votes	%	Votes	%
NDF	60,342	83.72%	209,422	81.62%	6,217,162	51.28%
UPFA	10,337	14.34%	41,631	16.22%	5,768,090	47.58%
Other Parties (with < 1%)	1,396	1.94%	5,533	2.16%	138,200	1.14%
Valid Votes	72,075	98.97%	256,586	99.00%	12,123,452	98.85%
Rejected Votes	747	1.03%	2,580	1.00%	140,925	1.15%
Total Polled	72,822	69.32%	259,166	69.30%	12,264,377	78.69%
Registered Electors	105,056		373,982		15,585,942	

=== 2010 Sri Lankan Presidential Election ===
Party	Kalkudah		Batticaloa Electoral District		Sri Lanka	
Party	Votes	%	Votes	%	Votes	%
NDF	35,608	60.45%	146,057	68.93%	4,173,185	40.15%
UPFA	20,112	34.14%	55,663	26.27%	6,015,934	57.88%
Other Parties (with < 1%)	2,120	3.60%	7,155	3.38%	165,268	1.59%
DUNF	1,065	1.81%	3,016	1.42%	39,226	0.38%
Valid Votes	58,905	97.87%	211,891	97.97%	10,393,613	99.03%
Rejected Votes	1,281	2.13%	4,396	2.03%	101,838	0.97%
Total Polled	60,186	61.96%	216,287	32.41%	10,495,451	66.70%
Registered Electors	97,135		667,353		15,734,587	

=== 2005 Sri Lankan Presidential Election ===
Party	Kalkudah		Batticaloa Electoral District		Sri Lanka	
Party	Votes	%	Votes	%	Votes	%
UNP	28,482	70.55%	121,514	79.51%	4,706,366	48.43%
UPFA	11,105	27.51%	28,836	18.87%	4,887,152	50.29%
Other Parties (with < 1%)	782	1.94%	2,487	1.63%	123,521	1.27%
Valid Votes	40,369	98.77%	152,837	98.85%	9,717,039	98.88%
Rejected Votes	503	1.23%	1,778	1.15%	109,869	1.12%
Total Polled	40,872	44.71%	154,615	47.82%	9,826,908	69.51%
Registered Electors	91,410		323,337		14,136,979	

=== 1999 Sri Lankan Presidential Election ===
Party	Kalkudah		Batticaloa Electoral District		Sri Lanka	
Party	Votes	%	Votes	%	Votes	%
UNP	22,614	47.99%	104,100	61.19%	3,602,748	42.71%
PA	21,939	46.55%	58,975	34.66%	4,312,157	51.12%
Other Parties (with < 1%)	1,286	2.73%	3,690	2.17%	468,469	5.55%
Liberal	665	1.41%	1,838	1.08%	25,085	0.30%
Ind 2	623	1.32%	1,528	0.90%	27,052	0.32%
Valid Votes	47,127	97.83%	170,131	97.85%	8,435,754	97.69%
Rejected Votes	1,043	2.17%	3,747	2.15%	199,536	2.31%
Total Polled	48,170	62.57%	173,878	63.82%	8,635,290	72.17%
Registered Electors	76,988		272,465		11,965,536	

=== 1994 Sri Lankan Presidential Election ===
Party	Kalkudah		Batticaloa Electoral District		Sri Lanka	
Party	Votes	%	Votes	%	Votes	%
PA	41,821	87.42%	144,725	87.30%	4,709,205	62.28%
UNP	3,930	8.21%	14,812	8.93%	2,715,283	35.91%
Ind 2	1,731	3.62%	5,030	3.03%	58,888	0.78%
Other Parties (with < 1%)	359	0.75%	1,214	0.73%	78,152	1.03%
Valid Votes	47,841	98.50%	165,779	98.42%	7,561,526	98.03%
Rejected Votes	730	1.50%	2,664	1.58%	151,706	1.97%
Total Polled	48,571	65.96%	168,443	63.57%	7,713,232	69.12%
Registered Electors	73,640		264,975		11,158,880	

=== 1988 Sri Lankan Presidential Election ===
Party	Kalkudah		Batticaloa Electoral District		Sri Lanka	
Party	Votes	%	Votes	%	Votes	%
UNP	15,289	46.61%	61,657	50.99%	2,569,199	50.43%
SLMP	9,135	27.85%	38,243	31.63%	235,701	4.63%
SLFP	8,375	25.53%	21,018	17.38%	2,289,857	44.95%
Valid Votes	32,799	96.82%	120,918	95.91%	5,094,754	98.24%
Rejected Votes	1,079	3.18%	5,163	4.09%	91,499	1.76%
Total Polled	33,878	57.01%	126,081	58.38%	5,186,256	55.87%
Registered Electors	59,421		215,983		9,283,143	

=== 1982 Sri Lankan Presidential Election ===
Party	Kalkudah		Batticaloa Electoral District		Sri Lanka	
Party	Votes	%	Votes	%	Votes	%
UNP	15,950	53.32%	48,094	40.05%	3,450,815	52.93%
SLFP	7,994	26.73%	21,688	18.06%	2,546,348	39.05%
ACTC	5,250	17.55%	47,095	39.22%	173,934	2.67%
Other Parties (with < 1%)	413	1.38%	1,905	1.59%	290,423	4.45%
LSSP	304	1.02%	1,294	1.08%	58,531	0.90%
Valid Votes	29,911	97.14%	120,076	97.66%	6,520,156	98.78%
Rejected Votes	880	2.86%	2,879	2.34%	80,470	1.22%
Total Polled	30,791	66.65%	122,955	70.55%	6,600,626	80.15%
Registered Electors	46,195		174,276		8,235,358	

== Parliamentary Election Results ==
=== Summary ===
The winner of Kalkudah has matched the final country result 1 out of 7 times.

Year	Kalkudah	Batticaloa Electoral District	MAE %	Sri Lanka	MAE %
2015	ITAK	ITAK	7.36%	UNP	23.62%
2010	UPFA	ITAK	4.62%	UPFA	19.91%
2004	ITAK	ITAK	6.71%	UPFA	37.34%
2001	TULF	TULF	9.59%	UNP	33.08%
2000	NUA	TULF	9.30%	PA	34.05%
1994	TULF	TULF	3.53%	PA	35.34%
1989	SLMC	TULF	5.67%	UNP	35.63%
Matches/Mean MAE	1/7	0/7	6.69%	7/7	31.28%

=== 2015 Sri Lankan Parliamentary Election ===
Party	Kalkudah		Batticaloa Electoral District		Sri Lanka	
Party	Votes	%	Votes	%	Votes	%
ITAK	28,718	44.78%	127,185	54.11%	515,963	4.63%
UNP	17,142	26.73%	32,359	13.77%	5,098,916	45.77%
SLMC	9,093	14.18%	38,477	16.37%	44,193	0.40%
UPFA	7,990	12.46%	32,232	13.71%	4,732,664	42.48%
Other Parties (with < 1%)	1,183	1.84%	4,789	2.04%	667,616	5.99%
Valid Votes	64,126	92.47%	235,042	93.12%	11,140,333	95.35%
Rejected Votes	4,234	6.11%	13,551	5.37%	516,926	4.42%
Total Polled	69,348	66.01%	252,397	69.12%	11,684,111	77.66%
Registered Electors	105,056		365,167		15,044,490	

=== 2010 Sri Lankan Parliamentary Election ===
Party	Kalkudah		Batticaloa Electoral District		Sri Lanka	
Party	Votes	%	Votes	%	Votes	%
UPFA	16,786	34.39%	62,009	34.67%	4,846,388	60.38%
ITAK	13,709	28.09%	66,235	37.04%	233,190	2.91%
UNP	9,090	18.62%	22,935	12.82%	2,357,057	29.37%
TMVP	6,739	13.81%	16,886	9.44%	20,284	0.25%
Other Parties (with < 1%)	1,248	2.56%	8,055	4.50%	492,361	6.13%
IG8B	632	1.29%	1,355	0.76%	1,355	0.02%
IG6B	608	1.25%	1,362	0.76%	1,362	0.02%
Valid Votes	48,812	90.46%	178,837	91.54%	8,026,322	96.03%
Rejected Votes	4,714	8.74%	14,749	7.55%	581,465	6.96%
Total Polled	53,960	55.55%	195,367	57.46%	8,358,246	59.29%
Registered Electors	97,135		339,982		14,097,690	

=== 2004 Sri Lankan Parliamentary Election ===
Party	Kalkudah		Batticaloa Electoral District		Sri Lanka	
Party	Votes	%	Votes	%	Votes	%
ITAK	43,503	61.46%	161,011	66.71%	633,203	6.85%
SLMC	22,244	31.43%	43,131	17.87%	186,880	2.02%
UPFA	2,706	3.82%	26,268	10.88%	4,223,126	45.70%
UNP	1,364	1.93%	6,151	2.55%	3,486,792	37.73%
Other Parties (with < 1%)	966	1.36%	4,814	1.99%	641,053	6.94%
Valid Votes	70,783	94.83%	241,375	95.02%	9,241,931	94.52%
Rejected Votes	3,862	5.17%	12,648	4.98%	534,452	5.47%
Total Polled	74,645	86.17%	254,023	83.58%	9,777,821	75.74%
Registered Electors	86,626		303,928		12,909,631	

=== 2001 Sri Lankan Parliamentary Election ===
Party	Kalkudah		Batticaloa Electoral District		Sri Lanka	
Party	Votes	%	Votes	%	Votes	%
TULF	20,767	40.19%	86,284	48.17%	348,164	3.89%
SLMC	18,689	36.17%	26,725	14.92%	105,346	1.18%
IND4	4,714	9.12%	6,406	3.58%	7,563	0.08%
UNP	3,103	6.00%	22,638	12.64%	4,086,026	45.62%
PA	2,079	4.02%	25,705	14.35%	3,330,815	37.19%
DPLF	1,040	2.01%	5,601	3.13%	16,669	0.19%
EPDP	784	1.52%	4,153	2.32%	72,783	0.81%
Other Parties (with < 1%)	499	0.97%	1,596	0.89%	946,107	10.56%
Valid Votes	51,675	92.36%	179,108	93.10%	8,955,844	94.77%
Rejected Votes	4,272	7.64%	13,275	6.90%	494,009	5.23%
Total Polled	55,947	69.34%	192,383	68.20%	9,449,878	76.03%
Registered Electors	80,685		282,079		12,428,762	

=== 2000 Sri Lankan Parliamentary Election ===
Party	Kalkudah		Batticaloa Electoral District		Sri Lanka	
Party	Votes	%	Votes	%	Votes	%
NUA	23,140	42.92%	53,646	28.77%	185,593	2.16%
TULF	21,425	39.74%	54,448	29.20%	105,907	1.23%
UNP	4,092	7.59%	29,163	15.64%	3,451,765	40.12%
Other Parties (with < 1%)	1,711	3.17%	18,086	9.70%	845,216	9.83%
PA	1,532	2.84%	16,510	8.86%	3,899,329	45.33%
IG1	1,416	2.63%	5,556	2.98%	9,799	0.11%
DPLF	602	1.12%	9,030	4.84%	20,655	0.24%
Valid Votes	53,918	N/A	186,439	N/A	8,602,617	N/A

=== 1994 Sri Lankan Parliamentary Election ===
Party	Kalkudah		Batticaloa Electoral District		Sri Lanka	
Party	Votes	%	Votes	%	Votes	%
TULF	23,261	47.75%	76,516	43.95%	132,461	1.67%
SLMC	11,179	22.95%	31,072	17.85%	143,307	1.80%
UNP	6,891	14.15%	23,244	13.35%	3,498,370	44.04%
TELO	3,557	7.30%	17,073	9.81%	24,974	0.31%
PA	2,944	6.04%	19,278	11.07%	3,887,805	48.94%
EPRLF	687	1.41%	4,802	2.76%	9,411	0.12%
Other Parties (with < 1%)	191	0.39%	2,103	1.21%	64,889	0.82%
Valid Votes	48,710	91.19%	174,088	91.81%	7,943,688	95.20%
Rejected Votes	4,705	8.81%	15,531	8.19%	400,395	4.80%
Total Polled	53,415	72.54%	189,619	71.49%	8,344,095	74.75%
Registered Electors	73,640		265,253		11,163,064	

=== 1989 Sri Lankan Parliamentary Election ===
Party	Kalkudah		Batticaloa Electoral District		Sri Lanka	
Party	Votes	%	Votes	%	Votes	%
SLMC	15,522	35.88%	36,867	23.73%	202,016	3.61%
TULF	13,383	30.94%	55,131	35.49%	188,594	3.37%
IND 1	11,589	26.79%	46,419	29.88%	46,419	0.83%
UNP	1,916	4.43%	11,317	7.28%	2,838,005	50.71%
SLFP	445	1.03%	4,130	2.66%	1,785,369	31.90%
Other Parties (with < 1%)	404	0.93%	1,497	0.96%	1,497	0.03%
Valid Votes	43,259	90.77%	155,361	91.78%	5,596,468	93.87%
Rejected Votes	4,401	9.23%	13,923	8.22%	365,563	6.13%
Total Polled	47,660	79.24%	169,284	78.16%	5,962,031	63.60%
Registered Electors	60,149		216,574		9,374,164	

== Demographics ==
=== Ethnicity ===
The Kalkudah Polling Division has a Sri Lankan Tamil majority (58.6%) and a significant Moor population (40.2%) . In comparison, the Batticaloa Electoral District (which contains the Kalkudah Polling Division) has a Sri Lankan Tamil majority (72.3%) and a significant Moor population (25.4%)

Ethnicity in Kalkudah
1. Sri Lankan Tamil (58.6%)
2. Moor (40.2%)
3. Other (1.20%)

=== Religion ===
The Kalkudah Polling Division has a Hindu majority (51.3%) and a significant Muslim population (40.2%) . In comparison, the Batticaloa Electoral District (which contains the Kalkudah Polling Division) has a Hindu majority (64.4%) and a significant Muslim population (25.5%)

Religion in Kalkudah
1. Hindu (51.3%)
2. Muslim (40.2%)
3. Other Christian (6.20%)
4. Roman Catholic (1.60%)
5. Other (0.60%)
