= Prince Casinader =

Sri Lankan Tamil politician (1926–2018)

Hon. Prince Casinader
- பிரின்ஸ் காசிநாதர்

Member of the Parliament of Sri Lanka
- In office 1989–1994
- Constituency: Batticaloa District

Personal details
- Born: 21 July 1926 Batticaloa, Ceylon
- Died: 12 December 2018 (aged 92) Batticaloa, Sri Lanka
- Party: Eelam People's Revolutionary Liberation Front
- Profession: Teacher
- Ethnicity: Sri Lankan Tamil

Prince Gunarasa Casinader (Tamil: பிரின்ஸ் குணராசா காசிநாதர்; 21 July 1926 – 12 December 2018) was a Sri Lankan Tamil teacher, politician and Member of Parliament.

== Early life and family ==
Casinader was born 21 July 1926 in Batticaloa in eastern Ceylon. He was the son of Charles Brown Casinader, a kachcheri mudaliyar, and Mildred. He had four brothers (Wesley, Bertram, Noble and Kingsley). He was educated at Vincent Girls' High School, St. Cecilia's Girls' College and Methodist Central College in Batticaloa.

Casinader had ambitions to be a lawyer but in 1946, due to a shortage of teachers, the principal of Methodist Central College, S. V. O. Somanader, invited Casinader to be a temporary voluntary teacher at the school. He studied at the Government Teachers' College (GTC) in Maharagama between 1950 and 1951, obtaining a diploma in education.

Casinader was married to Joyce. They had two daughters, Praemini and Sharmini.

== Career ==
After qualifying Casinader returned to Methodist Central College in 1952, serving as a teacher and deputy principal before becoming principal in 1975. He retired in 1986 after 40 years of teaching at Methodist Central College.

Casinader contested the 1989 parliamentary election as one of the ENDLF/EPRLF/TELO/TULF alliance's candidates in Batticaloa District and was elected to Parliament.

Casinader was president of the Batticaloa Citizens’ Committee and the Batticaloa Vigilance Committee. He represented Sri Lanka at Amnesty International's world conference in Amsterdam. He was vice-president of the Secondary Trained Teachers’ Union, president of the Batticaloa branch of the Ceylon Teachers’ Union and a founding member of the GTC Fifties. He was president of the Batticaloa Football Association and East Ceylon Travellers’ Federation, co-patron of the Ceylon Referees Association and vice-chairman of the Eastern Transport Board Consultative Committee. He was a member of the Eastern University of Sri Lanka's board of governors. He contributed articles for Sri Lankan newspapers and Asiaweek.

Casinader died on 12 December 2018 at his home in Batticaloa.

== Electoral history ==
Electoral history of Prince Casinader
Election	Constituency	Party	Alliance	Votes	Result
1989 parliamentary	Batticaloa District	Eelam People's Revolutionary Liberation Front	ENDLF/EPRLF/TELO/TULF	21,959	Elected
