= Paddiruppu Polling Division =

Paddiruppu
- Polling Division
- Coordinates: 7.591353°N 81.738126°E
- Country: Sri Lanka
- Province: Eastern Province, Sri Lanka
- Electoral District: Batticaloa Electoral District

Area
  - Total: 378.46 km^{2} (146.12 sq mi)

Population (2012)
  - Total: 279,032
  - Density: 737/km^{2} (1,910/sq mi)
- ISO 3166 code: EC-12C

The Paddiruppu Polling Division is a Polling Division in the Batticaloa Electoral District, in the Eastern Province, Sri Lanka.

== Presidential Election Results ==
=== Summary ===
The winner of Paddiruppu has matched the final country result 3 out of 8 times.

Year	Paddiruppu	Batticaloa Electoral District	MAE %	Sri Lanka	MAE %
2019	NDF	NDF	3.67%	SLPP	38.27%
2015	NDF	NDF	0.30%	NDF	31.08%
2010	NDF	NDF	11.21%	UPFA	42.03%
2005	UNP	UNP	14.98%	UPFA	45.93%
1999	UNP	UNP	16.71%	PA	32.75%
1994	PA	PA	6.68%	PA	32.25%
1988	UNP	UNP	5.72%	UNP	18.11%
1982	ACTC	UNP	19.09%	UNP	29.83%
Matches/Mean MAE	3/8	4/8	9.80%	8/8	33.78%

=== 2019 Sri Lankan Presidential Election ===
Party	Paddiruppu		Batticaloa Electoral District		Sri Lanka	
Party	Votes	%	Votes	%	Votes	%
NDF	54,132	83.05%	238,649	78.70%	5,564,239	41.99%
SLPP	7,948	12.19%	38,460	12.68%	6,924,255	52.25%
Other Parties (with < 1%)	2,332	3.58%	23,749	7.83%	729,468	5.50%
DUNF	767	1.18%	2,363	0.78%	34,537	0.26%
Valid Votes	65,179	98.98%	303,221	98.62%	13,252,499	98.99%
Rejected Votes	674	1.02%	4,258	1.38%	135,452	1.01%
Total Polled	65,853	71.62%	307,479	77.20%	13,387,951	83.71%
Registered Electors	91,945		398,301		15,992,568	

=== 2015 Sri Lankan Presidential Election ===
Party	Paddiruppu		Batticaloa Electoral District		Sri Lanka	
Party	Votes	%	Votes	%	Votes	%
NDF	44,485	81.76%	209,422	81.62%	6,217,162	51.28%
UPFA	8,216	15.10%	41,631	16.22%	5,768,090	47.58%
Other Parties (with < 1%)	1,711	3.14%	5,533	2.16%	138,200	1.14%
Valid Votes	54,412	98.86%	256,586	99.00%	12,123,452	98.85%
Rejected Votes	627	1.14%	2,580	1.00%	140,925	1.15%
Total Polled	55,039	62.82%	259,166	69.30%	12,264,377	78.69%
Registered Electors	87,612		373,982		15,585,942	

=== 2010 Sri Lankan Presidential Election ===
Party	Paddiruppu		Batticaloa Electoral District		Sri Lanka	
Party	Votes	%	Votes	%	Votes	%
NDF	36,776	80.12%	146,057	68.93%	4,173,185	40.15%
UPFA	5,968	13.00%	55,663	26.27%	6,015,934	57.88%
Other Parties (with < 1%)	1,566	3.41%	5,489	2.59%	141,978	1.37%
DUNF	1,016	2.21%	3,016	1.42%	39,226	0.38%
UDF	578	1.26%	1,666	0.79%	23,290	0.22%
Valid Votes	45,904	97.53%	211,891	97.97%	10,393,613	99.03%
Rejected Votes	1,161	2.47%	4,396	2.03%	101,838	0.97%
Total Polled	47,065	58.13%	216,287	32.41%	10,495,451	66.70%
Registered Electors	80,972		667,353		15,734,587	

=== 2005 Sri Lankan Presidential Election ===
Party	Paddiruppu		Batticaloa Electoral District		Sri Lanka	
Party	Votes	%	Votes	%	Votes	%
UNP	24,142	94.72%	121,514	79.51%	4,706,366	48.43%
UPFA	905	3.55%	28,836	18.87%	4,887,152	50.29%
Other Parties (with < 1%)	442	1.73%	2,487	1.63%	123,521	1.27%
Valid Votes	25,489	99.04%	152,837	98.85%	9,717,039	98.88%
Rejected Votes	247	0.96%	1,778	1.15%	109,869	1.12%
Total Polled	25,736	32.44%	154,615	47.82%	9,826,908	69.51%
Registered Electors	79,339		323,337		14,136,979	

=== 1999 Sri Lankan Presidential Election ===
Party	Paddiruppu		Batticaloa Electoral District		Sri Lanka	
Party	Votes	%	Votes	%	Votes	%
UNP	31,295	78.78%	104,100	61.19%	3,602,748	42.71%
PA	6,962	17.53%	58,975	34.66%	4,312,157	51.12%
Other Parties (with < 1%)	982	2.47%	5,218	3.07%	495,521	5.87%
Liberal	484	1.22%	1,838	1.08%	25,085	0.30%
Valid Votes	39,723	97.86%	170,131	97.85%	8,435,754	97.69%
Rejected Votes	869	2.14%	3,747	2.15%	199,536	2.31%
Total Polled	40,592	59.06%	173,878	63.82%	8,635,290	72.17%
Registered Electors	68,729		272,465		11,965,536	

=== 1994 Sri Lankan Presidential Election ===
Party	Paddiruppu		Batticaloa Electoral District		Sri Lanka	
Party	Votes	%	Votes	%	Votes	%
PA	40,489	94.16%	144,725	87.30%	4,709,205	62.28%
Ind 2	1,611	3.75%	5,030	3.03%	58,888	0.78%
UNP	631	1.47%	14,812	8.93%	2,715,283	35.91%
Other Parties (with < 1%)	268	0.62%	1,214	0.73%	78,152	1.03%
Valid Votes	42,999	98.07%	165,779	98.42%	7,561,526	98.03%
Rejected Votes	848	1.93%	2,664	1.58%	151,706	1.97%
Total Polled	43,847	68.12%	168,443	63.57%	7,713,232	69.12%
Registered Electors	64,365		264,975		11,158,880	

=== 1988 Sri Lankan Presidential Election ===
Party	Paddiruppu		Batticaloa Electoral District		Sri Lanka	
Party	Votes	%	Votes	%	Votes	%
UNP	16,227	47.40%	61,657	50.99%	2,569,199	50.43%
SLMP	13,977	40.83%	38,243	31.63%	235,701	4.63%
SLFP	4,031	11.77%	21,018	17.38%	2,289,857	44.95%
Valid Votes	34,235	93.52%	120,918	95.91%	5,094,754	98.24%
Rejected Votes	2,373	6.48%	5,163	4.09%	91,499	1.76%
Total Polled	36,608	64.85%	126,081	58.38%	5,186,256	55.87%
Registered Electors	56,447		215,983		9,283,143	

=== 1982 Sri Lankan Presidential Election ===
Party	Paddiruppu		Batticaloa Electoral District		Sri Lanka	
Party	Votes	%	Votes	%	Votes	%
ACTC	21,918	65.02%	47,095	39.22%	173,934	2.67%
UNP	7,129	21.15%	48,094	40.05%	3,450,815	52.93%
SLFP	3,485	10.34%	21,688	18.06%	2,546,348	39.05%
LSSP	531	1.58%	1,294	1.08%	58,531	0.90%
JVP	415	1.23%	1,287	1.07%	273,428	4.19%
Other Parties (with < 1%)	230	0.68%	618	0.51%	16,995	0.26%
Valid Votes	33,708	97.64%	120,076	97.66%	6,520,156	98.78%
Rejected Votes	813	2.36%	2,879	2.34%	80,470	1.22%
Total Polled	34,521	75.22%	122,955	70.55%	6,600,626	80.15%
Registered Electors	45,891		174,276		8,235,358	

== Parliamentary Election Results ==
=== Summary ===
The winner of Paddiruppu has matched the final country result 0 out of 7 times.

Year	Paddiruppu	Batticaloa Electoral District	MAE %	Sri Lanka	MAE %
2015	ITAK	ITAK	14.47%	UNP	32.03%
2010	ITAK	ITAK	10.51%	UPFA	32.81%
2004	ITAK	ITAK	22.97%	UPFA	40.75%
2001	TULF	TULF	17.08%	UNP	31.87%
2000	TULF	TULF	11.52%	PA	25.34%
1994	TULF	TULF	9.97%	PA	32.44%
1989	TULF	TULF	15.43%	UNP	35.32%
Matches/Mean MAE	0/7	0/7	14.56%	7/7	32.94%

=== 2015 Sri Lankan Parliamentary Election ===
Party	Paddiruppu		Batticaloa Electoral District		Sri Lanka	
Party	Votes	%	Votes	%	Votes	%
ITAK	35,535	73.54%	127,185	54.11%	515,963	4.63%
UNP	7,937	16.42%	32,359	13.77%	5,098,916	45.77%
UPFA	3,276	6.78%	32,232	13.71%	4,732,664	42.48%
Other Parties (with < 1%)	1,077	2.23%	42,401	18.04%	693,165	6.22%
AITC	498	1.03%	865	0.37%	18,644	0.17%
Valid Votes	48,323	90.97%	235,042	93.12%	11,140,333	95.35%
Rejected Votes	3,706	6.98%	13,551	5.37%	516,926	4.42%
Total Polled	53,121	60.63%	252,397	69.12%	11,684,111	77.66%
Registered Electors	87,612		365,167		15,044,490	

=== 2010 Sri Lankan Parliamentary Election ===
Party	Paddiruppu		Batticaloa Electoral District		Sri Lanka	
Party	Votes	%	Votes	%	Votes	%
ITAK	17,171	47.64%	66,235	37.04%	233,190	2.91%
UPFA	7,878	21.86%	62,009	34.67%	4,846,388	60.38%
TMVP	6,072	16.85%	16,886	9.44%	20,284	0.25%
TULF	2,402	6.66%	4,424	2.47%	9,223	0.11%
Other Parties (with < 1%)	1,196	3.32%	4,986	2.79%	484,493	6.04%
UNP	890	2.47%	22,935	12.82%	2,357,057	29.37%
IG6B	437	1.21%	1,362	0.76%	1,362	0.02%
Valid Votes	36,046	88.70%	178,837	91.54%	8,026,322	96.03%
Rejected Votes	4,116	10.13%	14,749	7.55%	581,465	6.96%
Total Polled	40,640	50.19%	195,367	57.46%	8,358,246	59.29%
Registered Electors	80,972		339,982		14,097,690	

=== 2004 Sri Lankan Parliamentary Election ===
Party	Paddiruppu		Batticaloa Electoral District		Sri Lanka	
Party	Votes	%	Votes	%	Votes	%
ITAK	57,052	94.90%	161,011	66.71%	633,203	6.85%
UNP	877	1.46%	6,151	2.55%	3,486,792	37.73%
EPDP	821	1.37%	2,556	1.06%	24,942	0.27%
Other Parties (with < 1%)	716	1.19%	28,526	11.82%	4,839,237	52.36%
SLMC	652	1.08%	43,131	17.87%	186,880	2.02%
Valid Votes	60,118	95.06%	241,375	95.02%	9,241,931	94.52%
Rejected Votes	3,125	4.94%	12,648	4.98%	534,452	5.47%
Total Polled	63,243	83.09%	254,023	83.58%	9,777,821	75.74%
Registered Electors	76,112		303,928		12,909,631	

=== 2001 Sri Lankan Parliamentary Election ===
Party	Paddiruppu		Batticaloa Electoral District		Sri Lanka	
Party	Votes	%	Votes	%	Votes	%
TULF	30,725	75.46%	86,284	48.17%	348,164	3.89%
UNP	3,967	9.74%	22,638	12.64%	4,086,026	45.62%
PA	2,159	5.30%	25,705	14.35%	3,330,815	37.19%
DPLF	1,449	3.56%	5,601	3.13%	16,669	0.19%
EPDP	1,265	3.11%	4,153	2.32%	72,783	0.81%
IND4	579	1.42%	6,406	3.58%	7,563	0.08%
Other Parties (with < 1%)	572	1.40%	28,321	15.81%	1,051,453	11.74%
Valid Votes	40,716	92.63%	179,108	93.10%	8,955,844	94.77%
Rejected Votes	3,241	7.37%	13,275	6.90%	494,009	5.23%
Total Polled	43,957	62.31%	192,383	68.20%	9,449,878	76.03%
Registered Electors	70,548		282,079		12,428,762	

=== 2000 Sri Lankan Parliamentary Election ===
Party	Paddiruppu		Batticaloa Electoral District		Sri Lanka	
Party	Votes	%	Votes	%	Votes	%
TULF	15,207	38.04%	54,448	29.20%	105,907	1.23%
PA	8,088	20.23%	16,510	8.86%	3,899,329	45.33%
ACTC	4,635	11.59%	6,968	3.74%	27,289	0.32%
UNP	3,128	7.82%	29,163	15.64%	3,451,765	40.12%
DPLF	2,847	7.12%	9,030	4.84%	20,655	0.24%
NUA	2,796	6.99%	53,646	28.77%	185,593	2.16%
IG1	1,243	3.11%	5,556	2.98%	9,799	0.11%
EPDP	870	2.18%	3,325	1.78%	50,702	0.59%
Other Parties (with < 1%)	741	1.85%	5,855	3.14%	747,395	8.69%
PP	421	1.05%	1,938	1.04%	19,830	0.23%
Valid Votes	39,976	N/A	186,439	N/A	8,602,617	N/A

=== 1994 Sri Lankan Parliamentary Election ===
Party	Paddiruppu		Batticaloa Electoral District		Sri Lanka	
Party	Votes	%	Votes	%	Votes	%
TULF	23,688	53.59%	76,516	43.95%	132,461	1.67%
PA	8,672	19.62%	19,278	11.07%	3,887,805	48.94%
TELO	6,493	14.69%	17,073	9.81%	24,974	0.31%
UNP	2,269	5.13%	23,244	13.35%	3,498,370	44.04%
EPRLF	1,976	4.47%	4,802	2.76%	9,411	0.12%
IND1	926	2.09%	1,547	0.89%	48,199	0.61%
Other Parties (with < 1%)	177	0.40%	31,628	18.17%	159,997	2.01%
Valid Votes	44,201	89.95%	174,088	91.81%	7,943,688	95.20%
Rejected Votes	4,940	10.05%	15,531	8.19%	400,395	4.80%
Total Polled	49,141	76.35%	189,619	71.49%	8,344,095	74.75%
Registered Electors	64,365		265,253		11,163,064	

=== 1989 Sri Lankan Parliamentary Election ===
Party	Paddiruppu		Batticaloa Electoral District		Sri Lanka	
Party	Votes	%	Votes	%	Votes	%
TULF	24,064	60.39%	55,131	35.49%	188,594	3.37%
IND 1	13,007	32.64%	46,419	29.88%	46,419	0.83%
UNP	1,943	4.88%	11,317	7.28%	2,838,005	50.71%
SLFP	505	1.27%	4,130	2.66%	1,785,369	31.90%
Other Parties (with < 1%)	326	0.82%	38,364	24.69%	203,513	3.64%
Valid Votes	39,845	88.84%	155,361	91.78%	5,596,468	93.87%
Rejected Votes	5,003	11.16%	13,923	8.22%	365,563	6.13%
Total Polled	44,848	79.97%	169,284	78.16%	5,962,031	63.60%
Registered Electors	56,079		216,574		9,374,164	

== Demographics ==
=== Ethnicity ===
The Paddiruppu Polling Division has a Sri Lankan Tamil majority (78.6%) and a significant Moor population (18.7%) . In comparison, the Batticaloa Electoral District (which contains the Paddiruppu Polling Division) has a Sri Lankan Tamil majority (72.3%) and a significant Moor population (25.4%)

Ethnicity in Paddiruppu
1. Sri Lankan Tamil (78.6%)
2. Moor (18.7%)
3. Other (1.40%)
4. Sinhalese (1.20%)

=== Religion ===
The Paddiruppu Polling Division has a Hindu majority (69.3%) and a significant Muslim population (18.8%) . In comparison, the Batticaloa Electoral District (which contains the Paddiruppu Polling Division) has a Hindu majority (64.4%) and a significant Muslim population (25.5%)

Religion in Paddiruppu
1. Hindu (69.3%)
2. Muslim (18.8%)
3. Roman Catholic (6.90%)
4. Other Christian (4.00%)
5. Buddhist (1.10%)
6. Other (0.00%)
