= Batticaloa Polling Division =

Batticaloa
- Polling Division
- Coordinates: 7.713747°N 81.543390°E
- Country: Sri Lanka
- Province: Eastern Province, Sri Lanka
- Electoral District: Batticaloa Electoral District

Area
  - Total: 811.3 km^{2} (313.2 sq mi)

Population (2012)
  - Total: 128,610
  - Density: 159/km^{2} (410/sq mi)
- ISO 3166 code: EC-12B

The Batticaloa Polling Division is a Polling Division in the Batticaloa Electoral District, in the Eastern Province, Sri Lanka.

== Presidential Election Results ==
=== Summary ===
The winner of Batticaloa has matched the final country result 4 out of 8 times.

Year	Batticaloa	Batticaloa Electoral District	MAE %	Sri Lanka	MAE %
2019	NDF	NDF	1.11%	SLPP	37.87%
2015	NDF	NDF	1.24%	NDF	29.16%
2010	NDF	NDF	0.49%	UPFA	29.01%
2005	UNP	UNP	0.19%	UPFA	30.63%
1999	UNP	UNP	1.30%	PA	15.09%
1994	PA	PA	4.02%	PA	21.04%
1988	UNP	UNP	3.97%	UNP	16.93%
1982	UNP	UNP	3.22%	UNP	13.76%
Matches/Mean MAE	4/8	4/8	1.94%	8/8	24.19%

=== 2019 Sri Lankan Presidential Election ===
Party	Batticaloa		Batticaloa Electoral District		Sri Lanka	
Party	Votes	%	Votes	%	Votes	%
NDF	109,449	78.13%	238,649	78.70%	5,564,239	41.99%
SLPP	12,594	8.99%	38,460	12.68%	6,924,255	52.25%
IND11	12,122	8.65%	13,228	4.36%	38,814	0.29%
Other Parties (with < 1%)	4,418	3.15%	10,580	3.49%	306,638	2.31%
NMPP	1,499	1.07%	2,304	0.76%	418,553	3.16%
Valid Votes	140,082	98.26%	303,221	98.62%	13,252,499	98.99%
Rejected Votes	2,480	1.74%	4,258	1.38%	135,452	1.01%
Total Polled	142,562	78.69%	307,479	77.20%	13,387,951	83.71%
Registered Electors	181,169		398,301		15,992,568	

=== 2015 Sri Lankan Presidential Election ===
Party	Batticaloa		Batticaloa Electoral District		Sri Lanka	
Party	Votes	%	Votes	%	Votes	%
NDF	97,779	80.39%	209,422	81.62%	6,217,162	51.28%
UPFA	21,473	17.65%	41,631	16.22%	5,768,090	47.58%
Other Parties (with < 1%)	2,385	1.96%	5,533	2.16%	138,200	1.14%
Valid Votes	121,637	99.10%	256,586	99.00%	12,123,452	98.85%
Rejected Votes	1,106	0.90%	2,580	1.00%	140,925	1.15%
Total Polled	122,743	71.16%	259,166	69.30%	12,264,377	78.69%
Registered Electors	172,499		373,982		15,585,942	

=== 2010 Sri Lankan Presidential Election ===
Party	Batticaloa		Batticaloa Electoral District		Sri Lanka	
Party	Votes	%	Votes	%	Votes	%
NDF	69,975	68.74%	146,057	68.93%	4,173,185	40.15%
UPFA	28,090	27.59%	55,663	26.27%	6,015,934	57.88%
Other Parties (with < 1%)	3,735	3.67%	10,171	4.80%	204,494	1.97%
Valid Votes	101,800	98.18%	211,891	97.97%	10,393,613	99.03%
Rejected Votes	1,885	1.82%	4,396	2.03%	101,838	0.97%
Total Polled	103,685	66.66%	216,287	32.41%	10,495,451	66.70%
Registered Electors	155,537		667,353		15,734,587	

=== 2005 Sri Lankan Presidential Election ===
Party	Batticaloa		Batticaloa Electoral District		Sri Lanka	
Party	Votes	%	Votes	%	Votes	%
UNP	65,401	79.34%	121,514	79.51%	4,706,366	48.43%
UPFA	15,798	19.17%	28,836	18.87%	4,887,152	50.29%
Other Parties (with < 1%)	1,229	1.49%	2,487	1.63%	123,521	1.27%
Valid Votes	82,428	98.84%	152,837	98.85%	9,717,039	98.88%
Rejected Votes	970	1.16%	1,778	1.15%	109,869	1.12%
Total Polled	83,398	56.36%	154,615	47.82%	9,826,908	69.51%
Registered Electors	147,979		323,337		14,136,979	

=== 1999 Sri Lankan Presidential Election ===
Party	Batticaloa		Batticaloa Electoral District		Sri Lanka	
Party	Votes	%	Votes	%	Votes	%
UNP	48,700	60.05%	104,100	61.19%	3,602,748	42.71%
PA	29,523	36.40%	58,975	34.66%	4,312,157	51.12%
Other Parties (with < 1%)	2,875	3.55%	7,056	4.15%	520,606	6.17%
Valid Votes	81,098	97.89%	170,131	97.85%	8,435,754	97.69%
Rejected Votes	1,750	2.11%	3,747	2.15%	199,536	2.31%
Total Polled	82,848	66.56%	173,878	63.82%	8,635,290	72.17%
Registered Electors	124,480		272,465		11,965,536	

=== 1994 Sri Lankan Presidential Election ===
Party	Batticaloa		Batticaloa Electoral District		Sri Lanka	
Party	Votes	%	Votes	%	Votes	%
PA	59,814	83.21%	144,725	87.30%	4,709,205	62.28%
UNP	9,812	13.65%	14,812	8.93%	2,715,283	35.91%
Ind 2	1,685	2.34%	5,030	3.03%	58,888	0.78%
Other Parties (with < 1%)	578	0.80%	1,214	0.73%	78,152	1.03%
Valid Votes	71,887	98.55%	165,779	98.42%	7,561,526	98.03%
Rejected Votes	1,061	1.45%	2,664	1.58%	151,706	1.97%
Total Polled	72,948	58.88%	168,443	63.57%	7,713,232	69.12%
Registered Electors	123,893		264,975		11,158,880	

=== 1988 Sri Lankan Presidential Election ===
Party	Batticaloa		Batticaloa Electoral District		Sri Lanka	
Party	Votes	%	Votes	%	Votes	%
UNP	29,976	56.04%	61,657	50.99%	2,569,199	50.43%
SLMP	14,972	27.99%	38,243	31.63%	235,701	4.63%
SLFP	8,547	15.98%	21,018	17.38%	2,289,857	44.95%
Valid Votes	53,495	96.92%	120,918	95.91%	5,094,754	98.24%
Rejected Votes	1,702	3.08%	5,163	4.09%	91,499	1.76%
Total Polled	55,197	55.35%	126,081	58.38%	5,186,256	55.87%
Registered Electors	99,717		215,983		9,283,143	

=== 1982 Sri Lankan Presidential Election ===
Party	Batticaloa		Batticaloa Electoral District		Sri Lanka	
Party	Votes	%	Votes	%	Votes	%
UNP	24,220	44.26%	48,094	40.05%	3,450,815	52.93%
ACTC	19,338	35.34%	47,095	39.22%	173,934	2.67%
SLFP	9,922	18.13%	21,688	18.06%	2,546,348	39.05%
Other Parties (with < 1%)	667	1.22%	1,912	1.59%	75,526	1.16%
JVP	580	1.06%	1,287	1.07%	273,428	4.19%
Valid Votes	54,727	97.99%	120,076	97.66%	6,520,156	98.78%
Rejected Votes	1,120	2.01%	2,879	2.34%	80,470	1.22%
Total Polled	55,847	69.47%	122,955	70.55%	6,600,626	80.15%
Registered Electors	80,394		174,276		8,235,358	

== Parliamentary Election Results ==
=== Summary ===
The winner of Batticaloa has matched the final country result 1 out of 7 times.

Year	Batticaloa	Batticaloa Electoral District	MAE %	Sri Lanka	MAE %
2015	ITAK	ITAK	5.16%	UNP	31.34%
2010	UPFA	ITAK	2.56%	UPFA	18.18%
2004	ITAK	ITAK	9.77%	UPFA	27.87%
2001	TULF	TULF	7.43%	UNP	19.37%
2000	NUA	TULF	5.15%	PA	25.05%
1994	TULF	TULF	5.63%	PA	32.05%
1989	IND 1	TULF	5.79%	UNP	31.24%
Matches/Mean MAE	1/7	0/7	5.93%	7/7	26.44%

=== 2015 Sri Lankan Parliamentary Election ===
Party	Batticaloa		Batticaloa Electoral District		Sri Lanka	
Party	Votes	%	Votes	%	Votes	%
ITAK	56,876	50.25%	127,185	54.11%	515,963	4.63%
SLMC	27,869	24.62%	38,477	16.37%	44,193	0.40%
UPFA	20,258	17.90%	32,232	13.71%	4,732,664	42.48%
UNP	6,179	5.46%	32,359	13.77%	5,098,916	45.77%
Other Parties (with < 1%)	2,008	1.77%	4,789	2.04%	667,616	5.99%
Valid Votes	113,190	94.02%	235,042	93.12%	11,140,333	95.35%
Rejected Votes	5,525	4.59%	13,551	5.37%	516,926	4.42%
Total Polled	120,384	69.79%	252,397	69.12%	11,684,111	77.66%
Registered Electors	172,499		365,167		15,044,490	

=== 2010 Sri Lankan Parliamentary Election ===
Party	Batticaloa		Batticaloa Electoral District		Sri Lanka	
Party	Votes	%	Votes	%	Votes	%
UPFA	35,089	39.92%	62,009	34.67%	4,846,388	60.38%
ITAK	32,758	37.27%	66,235	37.04%	233,190	2.91%
UNP	12,284	13.97%	22,935	12.82%	2,357,057	29.37%
TMVP	3,756	4.27%	16,886	9.44%	20,284	0.25%
Other Parties (with < 1%)	2,439	2.77%	6,348	3.55%	485,855	6.05%
TULF	1,578	1.80%	4,424	2.47%	9,223	0.11%
Valid Votes	87,904	92.98%	178,837	91.54%	8,026,322	96.03%
Rejected Votes	5,783	6.12%	14,749	7.55%	581,465	6.96%
Total Polled	94,537	60.78%	195,367	57.46%	8,358,246	59.29%
Registered Electors	155,537		339,982		14,097,690	

=== 2004 Sri Lankan Parliamentary Election ===
Party	Batticaloa		Batticaloa Electoral District		Sri Lanka	
Party	Votes	%	Votes	%	Votes	%
ITAK	57,144	54.01%	161,011	66.71%	633,203	6.85%
UPFA	22,716	21.47%	26,268	10.88%	4,223,126	45.70%
SLMC	19,612	18.53%	43,131	17.87%	186,880	2.02%
UNP	3,819	3.61%	6,151	2.55%	3,486,792	37.73%
Other Parties (with < 1%)	1,421	1.34%	2,258	0.94%	616,111	6.67%
EPDP	1,099	1.04%	2,556	1.06%	24,942	0.27%
Valid Votes	105,811	94.98%	241,375	95.02%	9,241,931	94.52%
Rejected Votes	5,592	5.02%	12,648	4.98%	534,452	5.47%
Total Polled	111,403	78.90%	254,023	83.58%	9,777,821	75.74%
Registered Electors	141,190		303,928		12,909,631	

=== 2001 Sri Lankan Parliamentary Election ===
Party	Batticaloa		Batticaloa Electoral District		Sri Lanka	
Party	Votes	%	Votes	%	Votes	%
TULF	32,805	39.45%	86,284	48.17%	348,164	3.89%
PA	21,076	25.34%	25,705	14.35%	3,330,815	37.19%
UNP	14,903	17.92%	22,638	12.64%	4,086,026	45.62%
SLMC	7,512	9.03%	26,725	14.92%	105,346	1.18%
DPLF	3,074	3.70%	5,601	3.13%	16,669	0.19%
EPDP	2,054	2.47%	4,153	2.32%	72,783	0.81%
IND4	1,046	1.26%	6,406	3.58%	7,563	0.08%
Other Parties (with < 1%)	692	0.83%	1,596	0.89%	946,107	10.56%
Valid Votes	83,162	93.63%	179,108	93.10%	8,955,844	94.77%
Rejected Votes	5,657	6.37%	13,275	6.90%	494,009	5.23%
Total Polled	88,819	67.88%	192,383	68.20%	9,449,878	76.03%
Registered Electors	130,846		282,079		12,428,762	

=== 2000 Sri Lankan Parliamentary Election ===
Party	Batticaloa		Batticaloa Electoral District		Sri Lanka	
Party	Votes	%	Votes	%	Votes	%
NUA	27,079	30.36%	53,646	28.77%	185,593	2.16%
UNP	21,267	23.84%	29,163	15.64%	3,451,765	40.12%
TULF	16,621	18.63%	54,448	29.20%	105,907	1.23%
PA	6,436	7.22%	16,510	8.86%	3,899,329	45.33%
DPLF	5,539	6.21%	9,030	4.84%	20,655	0.24%
TELO	3,282	3.68%	3,909	2.10%	25,830	0.30%
IG1	2,801	3.14%	5,556	2.98%	9,799	0.11%
EPDP	1,950	2.19%	3,325	1.78%	50,702	0.59%
ACTC	1,839	2.06%	6,968	3.74%	27,289	0.32%
PP	1,279	1.43%	1,938	1.04%	19,830	0.23%
Other Parties (with < 1%)	1,103	1.24%	1,946	1.04%	721,565	8.39%
Valid Votes	89,196	N/A	186,439	N/A	8,602,617	N/A

=== 1994 Sri Lankan Parliamentary Election ===
Party	Batticaloa		Batticaloa Electoral District		Sri Lanka	
Party	Votes	%	Votes	%	Votes	%
TULF	28,020	35.85%	76,516	43.95%	132,461	1.67%
SLMC	19,368	24.78%	31,072	17.85%	143,307	1.80%
UNP	13,622	17.43%	23,244	13.35%	3,498,370	44.04%
PA	7,413	9.48%	19,278	11.07%	3,887,805	48.94%
TELO	6,804	8.71%	17,073	9.81%	24,974	0.31%
EPRLF	2,069	2.65%	4,802	2.76%	9,411	0.12%
Other Parties (with < 1%)	861	1.10%	2,103	1.21%	64,889	0.82%
Valid Votes	78,157	93.09%	174,088	91.81%	7,943,688	95.20%
Rejected Votes	5,805	6.91%	15,531	8.19%	400,395	4.80%
Total Polled	83,962	67.77%	189,619	71.49%	8,344,095	74.75%
Registered Electors	123,893		265,253		11,163,064	

=== 1989 Sri Lankan Parliamentary Election ===
Party	Batticaloa		Batticaloa Electoral District		Sri Lanka	
Party	Votes	%	Votes	%	Votes	%
IND 1	21,445	30.18%	46,419	29.88%	46,419	0.83%
SLMC	21,172	29.80%	36,867	23.73%	202,016	3.61%
TULF	17,194	24.20%	55,131	35.49%	188,594	3.37%
UNP	7,186	10.11%	11,317	7.28%	2,838,005	50.71%
SLFP	3,162	4.45%	4,130	2.66%	1,785,369	31.90%
IND 2	899	1.27%	1,497	0.96%	1,497	0.03%
Valid Votes	71,058	94.06%	155,361	91.78%	5,596,468	93.87%
Rejected Votes	4,487	5.94%	13,923	8.22%	365,563	6.13%
Total Polled	75,545	76.23%	169,284	78.16%	5,962,031	63.60%
Registered Electors	99,096		216,574		9,374,164	

== Demographics ==
=== Ethnicity ===
The Batticaloa Polling Division has a Sri Lankan Tamil majority (71.4%) and a significant Moor population (26.2%) . In comparison, the Batticaloa Electoral District (which contains the Batticaloa Polling Division) has a Sri Lankan Tamil majority (72.3%) and a significant Moor population (25.4%)

Ethnicity in Batticaloa
1. Sri Lankan Tamil (71.4%)
2. Moor (26.2%)
3. Sinhalese (2.00%)
4. Other (0.40%)

=== Religion ===
The Batticaloa Polling Division has a Hindu majority (65.7%) and a significant Muslim population (26.3%) . In comparison, the Batticaloa Electoral District (which contains the Batticaloa Polling Division) has a Hindu majority (64.4%) and a significant Muslim population (25.5%)

Religion in Batticaloa
1. Hindu (65.7%)
2. Muslim (26.3%)
3. Other Christian (3.40%)
4. Roman Catholic (2.60%)
5. Buddhist (1.90%)
6. Other (0.00%)
