= G. Karunakaran =

Sri Lankan politician

Hon. G. Karunakaran MP
- கோ. கருணாகரன் ගෝවින්දන් කරුණාකරන්

Member of the Parliament of Sri Lanka
- Incumbent
- Assumed office 2020
- Constituency: Batticaloa District
- In office 1989–1994
- Constituency: Batticaloa District

Member of the Eastern Provincial Council
- In office 2012–2017
- Constituency: Batticaloa District

Personal details
- Born: Govinthan Karunakaran; 1 October 1963 (age 62)
- Party: Tamil Eelam Liberation Organization
- Other political affiliations: Tamil National Alliance

Govinthan Karunakaran (Tamil: கோவிந்தன் கருணாகரன்; born 1 October 1963), also known by the alias Jana (Tamil: ஜனா), is a Sri Lankan Tamil politician, former provincial councillor and Member of Parliament.

Karunakaran was born on 1 October 1963. He was educated at Cheddipalayam Maha Vidyalayam and St. Michael's College National School. Following the Black July anti-Tamil riots he left school in August 1983 and in November 1983 he joined Tamil Eelam Liberation Organization (TELO), a Tamil militant group. He received Guerrilla warfare training and June 1987 became TELO's regional leader in Ampara District and Batticaloa District. Later he became general-secretary of TELO.

Karunakaran contested the 1989 parliamentary election as one of the ENDLF/EPRLF/TELO/TULF electoral alliance's candidates in Batticaloa District and was elected to the Parliament. He contested the 2012 provincial council election as one of the Tamil National Alliance (TNA) electoral alliance's candidates in Batticaloa District and was elected to the Eastern Provincial Council. Karunakaran and the other newly elected TNA provincial councillors took their oaths on 28 September 2012 in front of TNA leader and Member of Parliament R. Sampanthan.

Karunakaran contested the 2015 parliamentary election as one of the TNA's candidates in Batticaloa District but failed to get elected. He contested the 2020 parliamentary election as a TNA candidate in Batticaloa District and was re-elected to the Parliament of Sri Lanka.

Electoral history of G. Karunakaran
Election	Constituency	Party	Alliance	Votes	Result
1989 parliamentary	Batticaloa District	Tamil Eelam Liberation Organization	ENDLF/EPRLF/TELO/TULF	25,651	Elected
2012 provincial	Batticaloa District	Tamil Eelam Liberation Organization	Tamil National Alliance	16,536	Elected
2015 parliamentary	Batticaloa District	Tamil Eelam Liberation Organization	Tamil National Alliance		Not elected
2020 parliamentary	Batticaloa District	Tamil Eelam Liberation Organization	Tamil National Alliance	26,382	Elected
