= N. Indirakumar =

Sri Lankan politician

Honourable N. Indirakumar MPC

Member of the Eastern Provincial Council for Batticaloa District
- Incumbent
- Assumed office 2012

Personal details
- Party: Tamil Eelam Liberation Organization
- Other political affiliations: Tamil National Alliance
- Ethnicity: Sri Lankan Tamil

Niththiyanantham Indirakumar (alias Prasanna) is a Sri Lankan Tamil politician and provincial councillor.

Indirakumar is the Deputy Leader and General Secretary of the Tamil Eelam Liberation Organization.

Indirakumar contested the 2010 parliamentary election as one of the Tamil National Alliance's candidates in Batticaloa District but failed to get elected after coming fifth amongst the TNA candidates. He contested the 2012 provincial council election as one of the TNA's candidates in Batticaloa District and was elected to the Eastern Provincial Council (EPC). A few days after the election some TNA councillors including Indirakumar were threatened and coerced into joining the United People's Freedom Alliance but none of them gave into the threats. Indirakumar and the other newly elected TNA provincial councillors took their oaths on 28 September 2012 in front of TNA leader and Member of Parliament R. Sampanthan.
