= K. Thurairajasingam =

Sri Lankan politician

Hon. K. Thurairajasingam MPC

Minister of Agriculture and Irrigation, Eastern Province
- Incumbent
- Assumed office 3 March 2015

Member of Parliament for Batticaloa District
- In office 1994–2000

Member of the Eastern Provincial Council for Batticaloa District
- Incumbent
- Assumed office 2012

Personal details
- Born: 28 July 1956 (age 69)
- Party: Illankai Tamil Arasu Kachchi
- Other political affiliations: Tamil National Alliance
- Profession: Lawyer

Krishnapillai Thurairajasingam (born 28 July 1956) is a Sri Lankan Tamil lawyer, politician, provincial minister and former Member of Parliament.

== Early life ==
Thurairajasingam was born on 28 July 1956.

== Career ==
Thurairajasingam is an attorney at law.

Thurairajasingam contested the 1994 parliamentary election as one of the Tamil United Liberation Front's candidates in Batticaloa District and was elected to Parliament. He contested the 2012 provincial council election as one of the Tamil National Alliance's candidates in Batticaloa District and was elected to the Eastern Provincial Council (EPC). Thurairajasingam and the other newly elected TNA provincial councillors took their oaths on 28 September 2012 in front of TNA leader and Member of Parliament R. Sampanthan. During the election campaign Thurairajasingam house was padlocked from the outside in a futile attempt to prevent him submitting the TNA's nominations.

Thurairajasingam became the Illankai Tamil Arasu Kachchi's (ITAK) general secretary in September 2014. Following the 2015 presidential election an all party provincial government was formed in the Eastern Province. Thurairajasingam took his oath as Minister of Agriculture and Irrigation in front of Governor Austin Fernando on 3 March 2015.
