= T. Thangavadivel =

Sri Lankan Tamil politician

Hon. T. Thangavadivel

Member of Parliament for Batticaloa District
- In office 2001–2004

Personal details
- Born: 28 February 1941 (age 85)
- Party: Tamil Eelam Liberation Organization
- Other political affiliations: Tamil National Alliance
- Profession: Civil servant

Thambirajah Thangavadivel (born 28 February 1941) is a Sri Lankan Tamil civil servant, politician and former Member of Parliament.

Thangavadivel was born on 28 February 1941. He is a Hindu and a land use officer (soil scientist). He is known as London Muruga and is from Araipattai, Batticaloa District.

Thangavadivel contested the 2001 parliamentary election as one of the Tamil National Alliance's candidates in Batticaloa District and was elected to Parliament.
