= Batticaloa Electoral District =

Electoral district in Sri Lanka

Batticaloa Electoral District மட்டக்களப்பு தேர்தல் மாவட்டம்
- Electoral District for the Parliament of Sri Lanka
- Administrative District: Batticaloa
- Province: Eastern
- Polling divisions: 3
- Population: 537,000 (2009)
- Electorate: 449,686"Member Calculation under Article 98(8)" (PDF). Department of Elections, Sri Lanka. Archived from the original (PDF) on October 15, 2011.(2010)
- Area: 2,854 km^{2} (1,102 sq mi)

Current Electoral District
- Number of members: 5
- MPs: ITAK (3) Shanakiyan Rasamanickam; G. Sirinesan; Ilaiyathambi Srinath NPP (1) Kandasami Prabhu SLMC (1) M. L. A. M. Hizbullah

Batticaloa Electoral District (Tamil: மட்டக்களப்பு தேர்தல் மாவட்டம் Maṭṭakkaḷappu Tērtal Māvaṭṭam) is one of the 22 multi-member electoral districts of Sri Lanka created by the 1978 Constitution of Sri Lanka. The district is conterminous with the administrative district of Batticaloa in the Eastern province. The district currently elects 5 of the 225 members of the Sri Lankan Parliament and had 449,686 registered electors in 2024. The district is Sri Lanka's Electorate Number 12.

== Polling Divisions ==
The Batticaloa Electoral District consists of the following polling divisions:

A: Kalkudah

B: Batticaloa

C: Paddiruppu

== Election results ==
=== 1982 presidential election ===
Results of the 1st presidential election held on 20 October 1982:

Candidate	Party	Votes per Polling Division			Postal Votes	Total Votes	%
Candidate	Party	Batti- caloa	Kal- kudah	Paddi- ruppu	Postal Votes	Total Votes	%
J. R. Jayewardene	UNP	24,220	15,950	7,129	795	48,094	40.05%
Kumar Ponnambalam	ACTC	19,338	5,250	21,918	589	47,095	39.22%
Hector Kobbekaduwa	SLFP	9.922	7,994	3,485	287	21,688	18.06%
Colvin de Silva	LSSP	438	304	531	21	1,294	1.08%
Rohana Wijeweera	JVP	580	258	415	34	1,287	1.07%
Vasudeva Nanayakkara	NSSP	229	155	230	4	618	0.51%
Valid Votes		54,727	29,911	33,708	1,730	120,076	100.00%
Rejected Votes		1,120	880	813	66	2,869	
Total Polled		55,847	30,791	34,521	1,796	122,955	
Registered Electors		80,394	46,195	45,891		172,480	
Turnout (%)		69.47%	66.65%	75.22%		71.29%	

=== 1988 provincial council election ===
Results of the 1st North Eastern provincial council election held on 19 November 1988:

Party	Votes per Polling Division			Total Votes	%	Seats
Party	Batti- caloa	Kal- kudah	Paddi- ruppu	Total Votes	%	Seats
Eelam People's Revolutionary Liberation Front	46,006	32,546	48,394	126,946	74.76%	8
Sri Lanka Muslim Congress	29,594	12,331	175	42,100	24.79%	3
United National Party	476	194	86	756	0.45%	0
Valid Votes	76,076	45,071	48,655	169,802	100.00%	11
Rejected Votes	1,495	629	610	2,734		
Total Polled	77,571	45,700	49,265	172,536		
Registered Electors	100,536	60,288	56,452	217,276		
Turnout (%)	77.16%	75.80%	87.27%	79.41%		

=== 1988 presidential election ===
Results of the 2nd presidential election held on 19 December 1988:

Candidate	Party	Votes per Polling Division			Postal Votes	Total Votes	%
Candidate	Party	Batti- caloa	Kal- kudah	Paddi- ruppu	Postal Votes	Total Votes	%
Ranasinghe Premadasa	UNP	29,976	15,289	16,227	165	61,657	50.99%
Sirimavo Bandaranaike	SLFP	8,547	8,375	4,031	65	21,018	17.38%
Oswin Abeygunasekara	SLPP	14,972	9,135	13,977	159	38,243	31.63%
Valid Votes		53,495	32,799	34,235	389	120,918	100.00%
Rejected Votes		1,702	1,079	2,373	9	5,163	
Total Polled		55,197	33,878	36,608	398	126,081	
Registered Electors		99,717	59,421	56,447		215,585	
Turnout (%)		55.35%	57.01%	64.85%		58.48%	

=== 1989 parliamentary general election ===
Results of the 9th parliamentary election held on 15 February 1989:

Party	Votes per Polling Division			Postal Votes	Total Votes	%	Seats
Party	Batti- caloa	Kal- kudah	Paddi- ruppu	Postal Votes	Total Votes	%	Seats
Tamil United Liberation Front (ENDLF, EPRLF, TELO, TULF)	17,194	13,383	24,064	490	55,131	35.49%	3
Independent 1 (EROS)	21,445	11,589	13,007	378	46,419	29.88%	1
Sri Lanka Muslim Congress	21,172	15,522	134	39	36,867	23.73%	1
United National Party (CWC, UNP)	7,186	1,916	1,943	272	11,317	7.28%	0
Sri Lanka Freedom Party	3,162	445	505	18	4,130	2.66%	0
Independent Group 2	899	404	192	2	1,497	0.96%	0
Valid Votes	71,058	43,259	39,845	1,199	155,361	100.00%	5
Rejected Votes	4,487	4,401	5,003	32	13,923		
Total Polled	75,545	47,660	44,848	1,231	169,284		
Registered Electors	99,096	60,149	56,079	1,250	216,574		
Turnout	76.23%	79.24%	79.97%	98.48%	78.16%		

The following candidates were elected: G. Karunakaran (TELO), 25,651 preference votes (pv); Alathipody Gunaseelan (EROS), 22,889 pv; Prince Casinader (EPRLF), 21,959 pv; Sam Tambimuttu (EPRLF), 19,431 pv; and M. L. A. M. Hizbullah (SLMC), 15,832 pv.

Sam Tambimuttu (EPRLF) was killed on 7 May 1990. His replacement was Joseph Pararajasingham (TULF).

=== 1994 parliamentary general election ===
Results of the 10th parliamentary election held on 16 August 1994:

Party	Votes per Polling Division			Postal Votes	Total Votes	%	Seats
Party	Batti- caloa	Kal- kudah	Paddi- ruppu	Postal Votes	Total Votes	%	Seats
Tamil United Liberation Front	28,020	23,261	23,688	1,547	76,516	43.95%	3
Sri Lanka Muslim Congress	19,368	11,179	79	446	31,072	17.85%	1
United National Party (CWC, UNP)	13,622	6,891	2,269	462	23,244	13.35%	1
People's Alliance (SLFP et al.)	7,413	2,944	8,672	249	19,278	11.07%	0
Tamil Eelam Liberation Organization (EROS, PLOTE, TELO)	6,804	3,557	6,493	219	17,073	9.81%	0
Eelam People's Revolutionary Liberation Front	2,069	687	1,976	70	4,802	2.76%	0
Independent Group 1	514	91	926	16	1,547	0.89%	0
Independent Group 2	347	100	98	11	556	0.32%	0
Valid Votes	78,157	48,710	44,201	3,020	174,088	100.00%	5
Rejected Votes	5,805	4,705	4,940	81	15,531		
Total Polled	83,962	53,415	49,141	3,101	189,619		
Registered Electors	123,893	73,640	64,365		261,898		
Turnout	67.77%	72.54%	76.35%		72.40%		

The following candidates were elected: Joseph Pararajasingham (TULF), 43,350 preference votes (pv); P. Selvarasa (TULF), 17,450 pv; K. Thurairajasingam (TULF),15,974 pv; M. L. A. M. Hizbullah (SLMC), 12,583 pv; and Seyed Ali Zahir Moulana (UNP), 11,508 pv.

=== 1994 presidential election ===
Results of the 3rd presidential election held on 9 November 1994:

Candidate	Party	Votes per Polling Division			Postal Votes	Total Votes	%
Candidate	Party	Batti- caloa	Kal- kudah	Paddi- ruppu	Postal Votes	Total Votes	%
Chandrika Kumaratunga	PA	59,814	41,821	40,489	2,601	144,725	87.30%
Srimathi Dissanayake	UNP	9,812	3,930	631	439	14,812	8.93%
Hudson Samarasinghe	Ind 2	1,685	1,731	1,611	3	5,028	3.03%
G. A. Nihal	SLPF	194	183	107	0	484	0.29%
A. J. Ranashinge	Ind 1	239	77	59	6	381	0.23%
Harischandra Wijayatunga	SMBP	145	99	102	3	349	0.21%
Valid Votes		71,887	47,841	42,999	3,052	165,779	100.00%
Rejected Votes		1,061	730	848	25	2,664	
Total Polled		72,948	48,571	43,847	3,077	168,443	
Registered Electors		123,893	73,640	64,365	3,204	261,898	
Turnout (%)		58.88%	65.96%	68.12%	96.04%	64.32%	

=== 1999 presidential election ===
Results of the 4th presidential election held on 21 December 1999:

Candidate	Party	Votes per Polling Division			Postal Votes	Total Votes	%
Candidate	Party	Batti- caloa	Kal- kudah	Paddi- ruppu	Postal Votes	Total Votes	%
Ranil Wickremasinghe	UNP	48,700	22,614	31,295	1,491	104,100	61.19%
Chandrika Kumaratunga	PA	29,523	21,939	6,962	551	58,975	34.66%
Rajiva Wijesinha	Liberal	687	665	484	2	1,838	1.08%
W. V. M. Ranjith	Ind 2	550	623	354	1	1,528	0.90%
Vasudeva Nanayakkara	LDA	406	183	200	95	884	0.52%
T. Edirisuriya	Ind 1	269	381	132	2	784	0.46%
Abdul Rasool	SLMP	394	288	37	31	750	0.44%
Kamal Karunadasa	PLSF	148	130	53	0	331	0.19%
Nandana Gunathilake	JVP	159	70	53	8	290	0.17%
Harischandra Wijayatunga	SMBP	100	95	54	1	250	0.15%
Hudson Samarasinghe	Ind 3	89	86	59	0	234	0.14%
A. W. Premawardhana	PFF	41	26	22	0	89	0.05%
A. Dissanayaka	DUNF	32	27	18	1	78	0.05%
Valid Votes		81,098	47,127	39,723	2,183	170,131	100.00%
Rejected Votes		1,750	1,043	869	85	3,747	
Total Polled		82,848	48,170	40,592	2,268	173,878	
Registered Electors		124,480	76,988	68,729		270,197	
Turnout (%)		66.56%	62.57%	59.06%		64.35%	

=== 2000 parliamentary general election ===
Results of the 11th parliamentary election held on 10 October 2000:

Party	Votes per Polling Division			Postal Votes	Total Votes	%	Seats
Party	Batti- caloa	Kal- kudah	Paddi- ruppu	Postal Votes	Total Votes	%	Seats
Tamil United Liberation Front	16,621	21,425	15,207	1,195	54,448	29.20%	2
National Unity Alliance (SLMC et al.)	27,079	23,140	2,796	631	53,646	28.77%	1
United National Party (DWC, NWC, UCPF, UNP)	21,267	4,092	3,128	676	29,165	15.64%	1
People's Alliance (SLFP et al.)	6,436	1,532	8,088	454	16,510	8.86%	1
Democratic People's Liberation Front (PLOTE)	5,539	602	2,847	42	9,030	4.84%	0
All Ceylon Tamil Congress	1,839	333	4,635	161	6,968	3.74%	0
Independent Group 1	2,801	1,416	1,243	96	5,556	2.98%	0
Tamil Eelam Liberation Organization	3,282	276	333	18	3,909	2.10%	0
Eelam People's Democratic Party	1,950	454	870	51	3,325	1.78%	0
Citizen's Front	1,279	228	421	10	1,938	1.04%	0
Independent Group 3	383	164	41	1	589	0.32%	0
Janatha Vimukthi Peramuna	175	90	27	3	295	0.16%	0
Independent Group 2	174	27	33	6	240	0.13%	0
Liberal Party	72	14	91	0	177	0.09%	0
Independent Group 5	53	41	49	0	143	0.08%	0
Sinhala Heritage	54	17	64	0	135	0.07%	0
Left & Democratic Alliance	68	18	22	5	113	0.06%	0
Sinhalaye Mahasammatha Bhoomiputra Pakshaya	49	17	26	0	92	0.05%	0
Democratic United National Front	39	17	28	0	84	0.05%	0
Independent Group 4	18	9	16	0	43	0.02%	0
Ruhuna People's Party	18	6	11	0	35	0.02%	0
Valid Votes	89,196	53,918	39,976		186,441	100.00%	5
Rejected Votes	5,047	2,918	3,159		11,205		
Total Polled	94,243	56,836	43,135		197,646		
Registered Electors	127,532	78,516	69,437		275,485		
Turnout (%)	73.90%	72.39%	62.12%		71.74%		

The following candidates were elected: Abdul Cader (NUA), 22,975 preference votes (pv); Nimalan Soundaranayagam (TULF), 16,542 pv; Seyed Ali Zahir Moulana (UNP), 14,284 pv; Joseph Pararajasingham (TULF), 12,605 pv; and S. Ganeshamoorthy (PA), 9,132 pv.

Nimalan Soundaranayagam (TULF) was killed on 7 November 2000.

=== 2001 parliamentary general election ===
Results of the 12th parliamentary election held on 5 December 2001:

Party	Votes per Polling Division			Postal Votes	Total Votes	%	Seats
Party	Batti- caloa	Kal- kudah	Paddi- ruppu	Postal Votes	Total Votes	%	Seats
Tamil National Alliance (ACTC, EPRLF(S), TELO, TULF)	32,805	20,767	30,725	1,987	86,284	48.17%	3
Sri Lanka Muslim Congress	7,512	18,689	180	344	26,725	14.92%	1
People's Alliance (NUA, SLFP et al.)	21,076	2,079	2,159	391	25,705	14.35%	1
United National Front (CWC, UNP, WPF)	14,903	3,103	3,967	665	22,638	12.64%	0
Independent Group 4	1,046	4,714	579	67	6,406	3.58%	0
Democratic People's Liberation Front (PLOTE)	3,074	1,040	1,449	38	5,601	3.13%	0
Eelam People's Democratic Party	2,054	784	1,265	50	4,153	2.32%	0
New Left Front (NSSP et al.)	290	134	195	0	619	0.35%	0
National Development Front	51	48	49	0	148	0.08%	0
Sri Lanka Muslim Party	62	52	9	2	125	0.07%	0
Janatha Vimukthi Peramuna	63	22	31	3	119	0.07%	0
Sinhala Heritage	40	49	14	0	103	0.06%	0
Independent Group 3	15	43	19	0	77	0.04%	0
Independent Group 1	18	51	4	3	76	0.04%	0
Independent Group 8	59	8	5	3	75	0.04%	0
Independent Group 10	25	17	22	0	64	0.04%	0
Sri Lanka Progressive Front	16	21	9	0	46	0.03%	0
Independent Group 9	14	19	6	1	40	0.02%	0
Independent Group 2	12	13	9	1	35	0.02%	0
Independent Group 5	14	10	10	0	34	0.02%	0
Independent Group 7	9	7	2	0	18	0.01%	0
Independent Group 6	4	5	8	0	17	0.01%	0
Valid Votes	83,162	51,675	40,716	3,555	179,108	100.00%	5
Rejected Votes	5,657	4,272	3,241	105	13,275		
Total Polled	88,819	55,947	43,957	3,660	192,383		
Registered Electors	130,846	80,685	70,548		282,079		
Turnout (%)	67.88%	69.34%	62.31%		68.20%		

The following candidates were elected: T. Thangavadivel (TNA-TELO), 24,475 preference votes (pv); G. Krishnapillai (TNA-ACTC), 20,675 pv; Joseph Pararajasingham (TNA-TULF), 20,279 pv; M. L. A. M. Hizbullah (PA), 19,787 pv; and M. B. Mohideen Abdul Cader (SLMC), 17,497 pv.

=== 2004 parliamentary general election ===
Results of the 13th parliamentary election held on 2 April 2004:

Party	Votes per Polling Division			Postal Votes	Total Votes	%	Seats
Party	Batti- caloa	Kal- kudah	Paddi- ruppu	Postal Votes	Total Votes	%	Seats
Tamil National Alliance (ACTC, EPRLF(S), ITAK, TELO)	57,144	43,503	57,052	3,312	161,011	66.71%	4
Sri Lanka Muslim Congress	19,612	22,244	652	623	43,131	17.87%	1
United People's Freedom Alliance (JVP, NUA, SLFP et al.)	22,716	2,706	299	547	26,268	10.88%	0
United National Front (CWC, DPF, UNP)	3,819	1,364	877	91	6,151	2.55%	0
Eelam People's Democratic Party	1,099	568	821	68	2,556	1.06%	0
Democratic People's Liberation Front (PLOTE)	711	44	248	7	1,010	0.42%	0
United Muslim People's Alliance	307	38	12	9	366	0.15%	0
Sri Lanka Progressive Front	72	75	7	1	155	0.06%	0
New Left Front (NSSP et al.)	57	41	20	1	119	0.05%	0
Independent Group 1	37	52	13	0	102	0.04%	0
Independent Group 8	31	30	22	1	84	0.03%	0
United Socialist Party	36	15	20	0	71	0.03%	0
Independent 2	36	20	9	0	65	0.03%	0
Independent Group 4	18	12	23	0	53	0.02%	0
Sri Lanka National Front	12	32	5	0	49	0.02%	0
Independent Group 6	22	5	7	0	34	0.01%	0
National Development Front	24	7	1	0	32	0.01%	0
Independent Group 7	12	13	5	0	30	0.01%	0
Independent Group 3	17	5	4	0	26	0.01%	0
Ruhuna People's Party	6	4	14	0	24	0.01%	0
Independent Group 5	17	2	2	0	21	0.01%	0
Jathika Hela Urumaya	6	3	5	3	17	0.01%	0
Valid Votes	105,811	70,783	60,118	4,663	241,375	100.00%	5
Rejected Votes	5,592	3,862	3,125	69	12,648		
Total Polled	111,403	74,645	63,243	4,732	254,023		
Registered Electors	141,190	86,626	76,112		303,928		
Turnout (%)	78.90%	86.17%	83.09%		83.58%		

The following candidates were elected: Thanmanpillai Kanagasabai (TNA), 57,843 preference votes (pv); Thangeswary Kathiraman (TNA), 50,545 pv; Senathirajah Jeyanandamoorthy (TNA), 44,457 pv; Kingsley Rasanayagam (TNA), 38,633 pv; and Ali Ameer Shihabdeen (SLMC), 21,232 pv.

Kingsley Rasanayagam (TNA) resigned shortly after being elected. His replacement P. Ariyanethiran (TNA) was sworn in on 18 May 2004.

=== 2005 presidential election ===
Results of the 5th presidential election held on 17 November 2005:

Candidate	Party	Votes per Polling Division			Postal Votes	Total Votes	%
Candidate	Party	Batti- caloa	Kal- kudah	Paddi- ruppu	Postal Votes	Total Votes	%
Ranil Wickremasinghe	UNP	65,401	28,482	24,142	3,489	121,514	79.51%
Mahinda Rajapaksa	UPFA	15,798	11,105	905	1,028	28,836	18.87%
Siritunga Jayasuriya	USP	474	214	201	3	892	0.58%
A. A. Suraweera	NDF	265	253	58	2	578	0.38%
Victor Hettigoda	ULPP	136	43	28	18	225	0.15%
A .K. J. Arachchige	DUA	93	44	16	0	153	0.10%
Chamil Jayaneththi	NLF	51	52	42	4	149	0.10%
Anura De Silva	ULF	73	37	29	3	142	0.09%
Aruna de Soyza	RPP	51	52	19	2	124	0.08%
Wije Dias	SEP	41	43	19	1	104	0.07%
P. Nelson Perera	SLPF	18	28	13	0	59	0.04%
Wimal Geeganage	SLNF	20	12	10	1	43	0.03%
H. S. Dharmadwaja	UNAF	7	4	7	0	18	0.01%
Valid Votes		82,428	40,369	25,489	4,551	152,837	100.00%
Rejected Votes		970	503	247	58	1,778	
Total Polled		83,398	40,872	25,736	4,609	154,615	
Registered Electors		147,979	91,410	79,339		318,728	
Turnout (%)		56.36%	44.71%	32.44%		48.51%	

=== 2008 provincial council election ===
Results of the 1st Eastern provincial council election held on 10 May 2008:

Party	Votes per Polling Division			Postal Votes	Displaced Votes	Total Votes	%	Seats
Party	Batti- caloa	Kal- kudah	Paddi- ruppu	Postal Votes	Displaced Votes	Total Votes	%	Seats
United People's Freedom Alliance (SLFP, TMVP et al.)	52,053	36,731	14,379	2,159	19	105,341	58.09%	6
United National Party (SLMC, UNP)	29,770	15,673	11,829	1,282	48	58,602	32.31%	4
Tamil Democratic National Alliance (EPRLF(P), PLOTE, TULF et al.)	3,222	443	3,594	454	1	7,714	4.25%	1
Eelam People's Democratic Party	1,199	1,421	2,612	135	51	5,418	2.99%	0
Eelavar Democratic Front (EROS)	1,118	111	509	78	0	1,816	1.00%	0
United Socialist Party	386	284	268	5	0	943	0.52%	0
Janatha Vimukthi Peramuna	218	97	37	26	1	379	0.21%	0
People's Front of Liberation Tigers	73	17	57	10	0	157	0.09%	0
Independent Group 15	77	26	25	1	0	129	0.07%	0
Independent Group 12	75	30	10	3	0	118	0.07%	0
Independent Group 9	81	2	4	4	0	91	0.05%	0
Independent Group 10	51	16	20	2	0	89	0.05%	0
Sinhalaye Mahasammatha Bhoomiputra Pakshaya	32	3	42	8	0	85	0.05%	0
Independent Group 3	28	6	20	1	0	55	0.03%	0
Independent Group 13	16	16	17	0	0	49	0.03%	0
Independent Group 14	18	10	17	0	0	45	0.02%	0
Independent Group 2	18	13	10	1	0	42	0.02%	0
Independent Group 1	24	6	10	0	0	40	0.02%	0
Muslim Liberation Front	23	8	7	1	0	39	0.02%	0
Independent Group 11	11	6	19	0	0	36	0.02%	0
Independent Group 6	4	20	4	2	0	30	0.02%	0
Independent Group 5	18	6	6	0	0	30	0.02%	0
Independent Group 8	5	11	11	1	0	28	0.02%	0
Independent Group 4	4	12	5	0	0	21	0.01%	0
Sri Lanka National Front	8	6	7	0	0	21	0.01%	0
Independent Group 7	10	3	7	0	0	20	0.01%	0
Sri Lanka Progressive Front	10	3	3	1	0	17	0.01%	0
Valid Votes	88,552	54,980	33,529	4,174	120	181,355	100.00%	11
Rejected Votes	9,011	6,576	5,293	180	28	21,088		
Total Polled	97,563	61,556	38,822	4,354	148	202,443		
Registered Electors	154,761	94,359	81,830			330,950		
Turnout	63.04%	65.24%	47.44%			61.17%		

The following candidates were elected: S. Chandrakanthan (UPFA-TMVP); Basheer Segu Dawood (UNP-SLMC); Edwin Silva Krishnanandaharajah (UPFA); M. L. A. M. Hizbullah (UPFA); Thambimuththu Alosiyas Masilamany (UNP); Aliyar Salih Javahir Salih (UPFA); Arasaretnam Sasitharan (UNP); Muhamed Sharief Subair (UPFA); Nagalingam Thiraviyam (UPFA); R. Thurairatnam (TDNA-EPRLF); and Ameertheen Vellathamby (UNP).

=== 2010 presidential election ===
Results of the 6th presidential election held on 26 January 2010:

Candidate	Party	Votes per Polling Division			Postal Votes	Displaced Votes	Total Votes	%
Candidate	Party	Batti- caloa	Kal- kudah	Paddi- ruppu	Postal Votes	Displaced Votes	Total Votes	%
Sarath Fonseka	NDF	69,975	35,608	36,776	3,637	61	146,057	68.93%
Mahinda Rajapaksa	UPFA	28,090	20,112	5,968	1,491	2	55,663	26.27%
M. C. M. Ismail	DUNF	927	1,065	1,016	8	0	3,016	1.42%
C. J. Sugathsiri Gamage	UDF	679	405	578	4	0	1,666	0.79%
Sarath Manamendra	NSH	253	185	206	1	0	645	0.30%
M. K. Shivajilingam	Ind 5	254	176	154	49	0	633	0.30%
A. A. Suraweera	NDF	239	222	150	1	0	612	0.29%
Lal Perera	ONF	231	146	161	3	0	541	0.26%
W. V. Mahiman Ranjith	Ind 1	188	208	86	2	0	484	0.23%
A. S. P Liyanage	SLLP	179	148	141	0	0	468	0.22%
Vikramabahu Karunaratne	LF	153	87	111	15	0	366	0.17%
Siritunga Jayasuriya	USP	107	75	100	2	0	284	0.13%
Ukkubanda Wijekoon	Ind 3	81	96	55	0	0	232	0.11%
Sanath Pinnaduwa	NA	72	59	70	0	0	201	0.09%
Wije Dias	SEP	74	57	54	0	0	185	0.09%
M. Mohamed Musthaffa	Ind 4	61	50	57	4	0	172	0.08%
Aithurus M. Illias	Ind 2	39	60	26	0	0	125	0.06%
Senaratna de Silva	PNF	32	33	58	1	0	124	0.06%
Aruna de Soyza	RPP	53	31	36	1	0	121	0.06%
Sarath Kongahage	UNAF	36	36	35	0	0	107	0.05%
Battaramulla Seelarathana	JP	39	27	36	0	0	102	0.05%
M. B. Thaminimulla	ACAKO	38	19	30	0	0	87	0.04%
Valid Votes		101,800	58,905	45,904	5,219	63	211,891	100.00%
Rejected Votes		1,885	1,281	1,161	67	2	4,396	
Total Polled		103,685	60,186	47,065	5,286	65	216,287	
Registered Electors		155,537	97,135	80,972			333,644	
Turnout		66.66%	61.96%	58.13%			64.83%	

=== 2010 parliamentary general election ===
Results of the 14th parliamentary election held on 8 April 2010:

Party	Votes per Polling Division			Postal Votes	Displaced Votes	Total Votes	%	Seats
Party	Batti- caloa	Kal- kudah	Paddi- ruppu	Postal Votes	Displaced Votes	Total Votes	%	Seats
Tamil National Alliance (EPRLF(S), ITAK, TELO)	32,758	13,709	17,171	2,576	21	66,235	36.67%	3
United People's Freedom Alliance (ACMC, NC, SLFP et al.)	35,089	16,786	7,878	2,254	2	62,009	34.33%	1
United National Front (DPF, SLFP(P), SLMC, UNP)	12,284	9,090	890	671	0	22,935	12.70%	1
Tamil Makkal Viduthalai Pulikal	3,756	6,739	6,072	318	1	16,886	9.35%	0
Tamil United Liberation Front	1,578	303	2,402	141	0	4,424	2.45%	0
Independent Group 6	300	608	437	17	0	1,362	0.75%	0
Independent Group 8	470	632	251	2	0	1,355	0.75%	0
Eelavar Democratic Front (EROS)	568	238	230	30	0	1,066	0.59%	0
Independent Group 10	235	157	197	7	0	596	0.33%	0
Independent Group 4	95	155	179	1	0	430	0.24%	0
Independent Group 17	97	97	132	0	0	326	0.18%	0
Democratic National Alliance (JVP et al.)	218	61	28	17	0	324	0.18%	0
Independent Group 27	127	82	102	1	0	312	0.17%	0
Independent Group 16	191	22	46	7	0	266	0.15%	0
Independent Group 18	102	48	99	1	0	250	0.14%	0
Independent Group 11	117	82	36	2	0	237	0.13%	0
Independent Group 26	153	10	8	3	0	174	0.10%	0
Democratic People's Liberation Front (PLOTE)	92	13	27	4	0	136	0.08%	0
Left Liberation Front (LLF, TNLA)	89	33	4	10	0	136	0.08%	0
United National Alternative Front	49	44	41	0	0	134	0.07%	0
Independent Group 19	36	34	49	0	0	119	0.07%	0
National Development Front	28	48	39	0	0	115	0.06%	0
Independent Group 22	13	67	11	6	0	97	0.05%	0
Independent Group 28	39	18	27	0	0	84	0.05%	0
Independent Group 9	22	29	16	1	0	68	0.04%	0
Independent Group 15	16	14	27	0	0	57	0.03%	0
Our National Front	26	13	12	0	0	51	0.03%	0
Independent Group 5	26	12	8	0	0	46	0.03%	0
Janasetha Peramuna	26	5	9	0	0	40	0.02%	0
All Are Citizens, All Are Kings Organisation	13	9	15	0	0	37	0.02%	0
Independent Group 3	17	14	5	0	0	36	0.02%	0
Independent Group 7	15	14	6	0	0	35	0.02%	0
United Lanka Great Council	10	7	14	0	0	31	0.02%	0
Independent Group 12	15	8	6	0	0	29	0.02%	0
Independent Group 1	10	10	6	0	0	26	0.01%	0
Independent Group 25	18	4	4	0	0	26	0.01%	0
Independent Group 2	9	4	8	0	0	21	0.01%	0
Independent Group 20	10	5	6	0	0	21	0.01%	0
Independent Group 14	9	5	5	0	0	19	0.01%	0
Independent Group 21	10	0	4	0	0	14	0.01%	0
Muslim Liberation Front	3	4	6	1	0	14	0.01%	0
Independent Group 24	5	2	4	0	0	11	0.01%	0
Sinhalaye Mahasammatha Bhoomiputra Pakshaya	5	2	4	0	0	11	0.01%	0
Independent Group 13	4	5	0	0	0	9	0.00%	0
Independent Group 23	1	4	3	0	0	8	0.00%	0
Valid Votes	88,754	49,246	36,524	6,070	24	180,618	100.00%	5
Rejected Votes	5,783	4,714	4,116	136	0	14,749		
Total Polled	94,537	53,960	40,640	6,206	24	195,367		
Registered Electors	155,537	97,135	80,972			333,644		
Turnout	60.78%	55.55%	50.19%			58.56%		

The following candidates were elected: M. L. A. M. Hizbullah (UPFA-ACMC), 22,256 preference votes (pv); S. Yogeswaran (TNA), 20,569 pv; P. Selvarasa (TNA), 18,485 pv; P. Ariyanethiran (TNA), 16,504 pv; and Basheer Segu Dawood (UNF), 11,678 pv.

=== 2012 provincial council election ===
Results of the 2nd Eastern provincial council election held on 8 September 2012:

Party	Votes per Polling Division			Postal Votes	Total Votes	%	Seats
Party	Batti- caloa	Kal- kudah	Paddi- ruppu	Postal Votes	Total Votes	%	Seats
Tamil National Alliance (EPRLF (S), ITAK, PLOTE, TELO, TULF)	44,863	21,876	34,705	3,238	104,682	50.83%	6
United People's Freedom Alliance (ACMC, NC, SLFP, TMVP et al.)	31,194	22,965	8,603	1,428	64,190	31.17%	4
Sri Lanka Muslim Congress	13,964	8,604	72	443	23,083	11.21%	1
Independent Group 8	5,355	180	7	170	5,712	2.77%	0
United National Party	1,026	1,014	331	63	2,434	1.18%	0
Independent Group 21	1,205	607	62	31	1,905	0.93%	0
Eelavar Democratic Front (EROS)	625	434	710	8	1,777	0.86%	0
Independent Group 11	568	124	151	20	863	0.42%	0
Socialist Alliance (CPSL, DLF, LSSP)	274	71	27	7	379	0.18%	0
Our National Front	72	42	47	2	163	0.08%	0
Independent Group 19	121	17	8	0	146	0.07%	0
Janatha Vimukthi Peramuna	51	3	17	1	72	0.03%	0
Independent Group 20	31	23	6	1	61	0.03%	0
Sri Lanka Labour Party	28	21	1	0	50	0.02%	0
Independent Group 2	35	8	4	0	47	0.02%	0
Independent Group 16	11	15	14	0	40	0.02%	0
United Socialist Party	13	18	6	0	37	0.02%	0
Independent Group 18	19	6	3	1	29	0.01%	0
Independent Group 5	10	10	6	0	26	0.01%	0
Independent Group 1	15	5	4	1	25	0.01%	0
Independent Group 9	19	1	3	0	23	0.01%	0
Independent Group 4	13	5	2	0	20	0.01%	0
Independent Group 12	9	2	8	0	19	0.01%	0
Jana Setha Peramuna	9	4	5	1	19	0.01%	0
Independent Group 7	11	3	3	1	18	0.01%	0
Independent Group 13	11	5	1	0	17	0.01%	0
Independent Group 6	12	3	2	0	17	0.01%	0
United Lanka People's Party	6	9	1	0	16	0.01%	0
United Lanka Great Council	5	6	4	0	15	0.01%	0
Independent Group 14	4	6	2	0	12	0.01%	0
Independent Group 15	10	0	1	0	11	0.01%	0
Independent Group 3	7	3	1	0	11	0.01%	0
Independent Group 10	5	4	0	0	9	0.00%	0
Independent Group 17	7	0	1	0	8	0.00%	0
Valid Votes	99,608	56,094	44,818	5,416	205,936	100.00%	11
Rejected Votes	7,464	5,263	4,374	122	17,223		
Total Polled	107,072	61,357	49,192	5,538	223,159		
Registered Electors	162,451	100,616	84,032	0	347,099		
Turnout	65.91%	60.98%	58.54%		64.29%		

The following candidates were elected: R. Thurairatnam (TNA-EPRLF), 29,141 preference votes (pv); K. Thurairajasingam (TNA-ITAK), 27,717 pv; S. Chandrakanthan (UPFA-TMVP), 22,338 pv; Ali Ameer Shihabdeen (UPFA-ACMC), 21,271 pv; Abdul Farook Mohamed Shibly (UPFA-ACMC), 20,407 pv; G. Krishnapillai (TNA-TULF), 20,200 pv; Abtul Shareef Subair (UPFA-ACMC), 17,903 pv; N. Indirakumar (TNA-TELO), 17,304 pv; M. Nadarajah (TNA-ITAK), 16,681 pv; G. Karunakaran (TNA-TELO), 16,536 pv; and Agamed Nazeer Zainulabdeen (SLMC), 11,401 pv.
