= Senathirajah =

Senathirajah may refer to:

- S. Jeyanandamoorthy (born 1965), a Sri Lankan Tamil politician and former member of parliament
- Mavai Senathirajah (1942–2025), a Sri Lankan Tamil politician
