= Selvarasa =

Selvarasa (Tamil: செல்வராசா) is a Tamil-language name that can be used as a given name or surname. Notable people with the name include:

- P. Selvarasa (born 1946), Sri Lankan politician
- Selvarasa Pathmanathan (born 1955), Sri Lankan politician
