= G. Sirinesan =

Sri Lankan politician

Hon. G. Sirinesan MP

Member of Parliament for Batticaloa District
- Incumbent
- Assumed office 17 August 2015

Personal details
- Born: 1 July 1960 (age 66)
- Party: Illankai Tamil Arasu Kachchi
- Other political affiliations: Tamil National Alliance
- Education: University of Peradeniya
- Ethnicity: Sri Lankan Tamil

Gnanamuttu Sirinesan (Tamil: ஞானமுத்து சிறிநேசன்; born 1 July 1960) is a Sri Lankan Tamil politician and Member of Parliament.

== Early life ==
Sirinesan was born on 1 July 1960. He was educated at A.T.K. School, Vavunativu and Sittandi Madhya Maha Vidyalayam. After school he joined the University of Peradeniya, graduating with a B.A. degree. He also holds a M.A. degree in politics.

== Career ==
Sirinesan is a former deputy director of the Manmunai West Education Zone.

Sirinesan was one of the Tamil National Alliance's (TNA) candidates in Batticaloa District at the 2015 parliamentary election. He was elected and entered Parliament.

== Electoral history ==
Electoral history of G. Sirinesan
| Election | Constituency | Party | Votes | Result |
|---|---|---|---|---|
| 2015 parliamentary | Batticaloa District | TNA | 48,821 | Elected |
