= Eelam People's Revolutionary Liberation Front =

Eelam People's Revolutionary Liberation Front ஈழமக்கள் புரட்சிகர விடுதலை முன்னணி ඊලාම් ජනතා විප්ලවවාදී විමුක්ති පෙරමුණ
- Secretary: Suresh Premachandran (Suresh wing)
- Founder: K. Pathmanabha; Suresh Premachandran
- Founded: 1980
- Split from: EROS
- Headquarters: 85/9 Pokuna Road, Hendala, Wattala (Suresh wing); 15C Summit Flats, Keppetipola Mawatha, Colombo 07 (Padmanaba wing)
- Ideology: Tamil nationalism Secularism
- Political position: Centre-left
- National affiliation: TPNA (Suresh wing); Democratic Tamil National Alliance (Padmanaba wing)

Election symbol
- Flower (Suresh wing); Candle (Padmanaba wing)

Website
- www.eprlf.com

The Eelam People's Revolutionary Liberation Front (EPRLF) is a series of Sri Lankan political parties and a former militant separatist group.

== Militant separatists ==
The EPRLF was formed in 1980 by K. Pathmanabha (Padmanaba), Douglas Devananda, Suresh Premachandran and Varatharajah Perumal as a breakaway faction of the Eelam Revolutionary Organisation of Students.

In 1982 the EPRLF formed a military wing, People's Liberation Army, headed by Douglas Devananda. The PLA is believed to have received military training by the Popular Front for the Liberation of Palestine.

In early 1986 disputes amongst the EPRLF leadership led to it splitting into two factions: EPRLF (Ranjan) and EPRLF (Douglas).

In late 1986 the Tamil Tigers attacked the EPRLF, inflicting heavy losses. Many of its cadres were killed or taken prisoner and its camps and weapons were seized by the Tigers. Douglas Devananda was blamed for the debacle.

In 1987 the EPRLF (Douglas) faction formally split from the EPRLF. It initially formed the Eelam National Democratic Liberation Front with a breakaway faction of the People's Liberation Organisation of Tamil Eelam led by Paranthan Rajan, but later transformed itself into the Eelam People's Democratic Party.

== Political party ==
After its military defeat by the Tamil Tigers the EPRLF transformed itself into political party and allied itself with the Indian Peace Keeping Force (IPKF) who were occupying much of Northern and Eastern Sri Lanka.

The EPRLF's first foray into politics came in the flawed 1988 provincial council elections. With the assistance of IPKF the EPRLF secured 41 of the 71 seats on the North Eastern Provincial Council. On 10 December 1988 Varatharajah Perumal became the first Chief Minister of the North Eastern Provincial Council.

The EPRLF formed an alliance with the Eelam National Democratic Liberation Front, Tamil Eelam Liberation Organization and Tamil United Liberation Front to contest the 1989 parliamentary elections. The alliance won 188,593 votes (3.40%), securing 10 of the 225 seats in Parliament. 7 of the 10 alliance MPs were from the EPRLF.

On 1 March 1990, just as the IPKF were preparing to withdraw from Sri Lanka, Varatharajah Permual moved a motion in the North Eastern Provincial Council declaring an independent Eelam. President Premadasa reacted to Permual's UDI by dissolving the provincial council and imposing direct rule on the province. The EPRLF's leadership fled to Madras (now Chennai), India.

On 19 June 1990 the Tamil Tigers attacked an EPRLF meeting in Madras, murdering thirteen EPRLF members including leader K. Padmanaba, Jaffna District MP G. Yogasangari and former North Eastern Province Finance Minister P. Kirubakaran.

In 1997, after the Sri Lankan military had recaptured the Jaffna Peninsula from the Tamil Tigers, the EPRLF re-opened its Jaffna office. It took part in the 1998 local elections held in the peninsula and was able to win 13,140 votes (14.35%), winning 25 seats across 11 local councils.

The party broke into two factions in 1999 when its General Secretary Kandaiah "Suresh" Premachandran made a deal with the Tamil Tigers. The majority of the party formed the EPRLF (Varathar) wing under the leadership of Varatharajah Perumal whilst the rest formed the EPRLF (Suresh) wing under the leadership of Suresh Premachandran. Crucially Suresh had control of most of the EPRLF's assets as well as its name (as registered with the Sri Lankan Department of Elections).

=== Suresh wing ===
The Suresh wing joined other pro-Tamil Tiger parties in 2001 to form the Tamil National Alliance (TNA).

==== 2001 Parliamentary General Election ====
In the first parliamentary election contested by the Tamil National Alliance, the 5 December 2001 election, the TNA led by Rajavarothiam Sampanthan won 3.88% of the popular vote and 15 out of 225 seats in the Sri Lankan parliament.

Votes and seats won by TNA by electoral district

Electoral District	Votes	%	Seats	Turnout	TNA MPs
Ampara	48,789	17.41%	1	82.51%	A. Chandranehru (TULF)
Batticaloa	86,284	48.17%	3	68.20%	G. Krishnapillai (ACTC); Joseph Pararajasingham (TULF); Thambiraja Thangavadivel (TELO)
Colombo	12,696	1.20%	0	76.31%	
Jaffna	102,324	54.84%	6	31.14%	V. Anandasangaree (TULF); Gajendrakumar Ponnambalam (ACTC); Nadarajah Raviraj (TULF); Mavai Senathirajah (TULF); M. K. Shivajilingam (TELO); A. Vinayagamoorthy (ACTC)
Trincomalee	56,121	34.83%	1	79.88%	R. Sampanthan (TULF)
Vanni	41,950	44.39%	3	46.77%	Selvam Adaikalanathan (TELO); Sivasakthy Ananthan (EPRLF); Irasa Kuhaneswaran (TELO)
National List			1		M. Sivasithamparam (TULF), died 5 June 2002; K. Thurairetnasingam (TULF) (replaces M. Sivasithamparam)
Total	348,164	3.88%	15	76.03%	
Source:"Parliamentary General Election 2001, Final District Results". Department of Elections, Sri Lanka.

==== 2004 Parliamentary General Election ====
In the 2 April 2004 parliamentary election in which the United People's Freedom Alliance led by President Kumaratunga came to power, the Tamil National Alliance led by Rajavarothiam Sampanthan won 6.84% of the popular vote and 22 out of 225 seats in the Sri Lankan parliament.

Votes and seats won by TNA by electoral district

Electoral District	Votes	%	Seats	Turnout	TNA MPs
Ampara	55,533	19.13%	1	81.42%	K. Pathmanathan, died 21 May 2009; Thomas Thangathurai William, from 12 June 2009 (replaces K. Pathmanathan)
Batticaloa	161,011	66.71%	4	83.58%	Senathirajah Jeyanandamoorthy; Thanmanpillai Kanagasabai; Thangeswary Kathiraman; Kingsley Rasanayagam, resigned April 2004; P. Ariyanethiran, from 18 May 2004 (replaces Kingsley Rasanayagam)
Jaffna	257,320	90.60%	8	47.38%	Selvarajah Kajendren; Gajendrakumar Ponnambalam (ACTC); Suresh Premachandran (EPRLF); Nadarajah Raviraj (ITAK), murdered 10 November 2006; Mavai Senathirajah (ITAK); M. K. Shivajilingam (TELO); K. Sivanesan, murdered 6 March 2008; Pathmini Sithamparanathan; Nallathamby Srikantha (TELO), from 30 November 2006 (replaces Nadarajah Raviraj); Solomon Cyril, from 9 April 2008 (replaces Kidnan Sivanesan)
Trincomalee	68,955	37.72%	2	85.44%	R. Sampanthan (ITAK); K. Thurairetnasingam (ITAK)
Vanni	90,835	64.71%	5	66.64%	Selvam Adaikalanathan (TELO); Sivasakthy Ananthan (EPRLF); Sathasivam Kanagaratnam; Sivanathan Kisshor; Vino Noharathalingam (TELO)
National List			2		M. K. Eelaventhan, expelled from Parliament 14 December 2007 for non-attendance Joseph Pararajasingham (ITAK), murdered 24 December 2005; Chandra Nehru Chandrakanthan, from 27 September 2006 (replaces Joseph Pararajasingham); Raseen Mohammed Imam, from 5 February 2008 (replaces M. K. Eelaventhan)
Total	633,654	6.84%	22	75.96%	
Source:"Parliamentary General Election 2004, Final District Results". Department of Elections, Sri Lanka.

==== 2010 Parliamentary General Election ====
In the 2010 Sri Lankan parliamentary election, in which the United People's Freedom Alliance , led by Mahinda Rajapaksa, retained power, the Tamil National Alliance, led by Rajavarothiam Sampanthan, won 2.9% of the popular vote and 14 out of 225 seats in the Sri Lankan parliament.

Votes and seats won by the TNA by electoral district

Electoral District	Votes	%	Seats	Turnout	TNA MPs
Ampara	26,895	10.47%	1	64.74%	Podiappuhamy Piyasena
Batticaloa	66,235	36.67%	3	58.56%	P. Ariyanethiran (ITAK); P. Selvarasa (ITAK); S. Yogeswaran (ITAK)
Jaffna	65,119	43.85%	5	23.33%	Suresh Premachandran (EPRLF); E. Saravanapavan (ITAK); Mavai Senathirajah (ITAK); S. Sritharan (ITAK); A. Vinayagamoorthy
Trincomalee	33,268	23.81%	1	62.20%	R. Sampanthan (ITAK)
Vanni	41,673	38.96%	3	43.89%	Selvam Adaikalanathan (TELO); Sivasakthy Ananthan (EPRLF); Vino Noharathalingam (TELO)
National List			1		M. A. Sumanthiran (ITAK)
Total	233,190	2.90%	14	61.26%	
Source:"Parliamentary General Election – 2010". Department of Elections, Sri Lanka.

=== Varathar wing / Padmanaba wing ===
The Varathar wing has restyled itself as the Padmanaba wing, after its murdered leader. It is registered as a political party with the Sri Lankan Department of Elections under the name of Padmanaba Eelam People's Revolutionary Liberation Front. In 2008 it joined with other anti-Tamil Tiger parties to form the Tamil Democratic National Alliance (later restyled Democratic Tamil National Alliance) to contest provincial and local elections.

The wing's de facto leader (Varatharajah Perumal is in exile in India) Kandiah "Robert" Subathiran was murdered on 14 June 2003. The wing's current General Secretary (and de facto leader) is Thirunavukkarasu Sritharan (Sridharan).

== Paramilitary group ==
There have been repeated allegations that various factions of the EPRLF, despite their claim to have given up violence, operate armed wings which have worked with the IPKF and Sri Lankan Army. A group composed of former EPRLF cadres known as Razeek Group works along with the Sri Lankan Army as a paramilitary group in activities against the Tamil Tigers in the Batticaloa region. They have also been accused of indulging in massacres, kidnappings and torture
