= Ilaiyathambi Srinath =

Sri Lankan politician

Hon. Ilaiyathambi Srinath MP

Member of Parliament for Batticaloa Electoral District
- Incumbent
- Assumed office 15 November 2024

Personal details
- Party: Ilankai Tamil Arasu Kachchi
- Profession: Politician

Ilaiyathambi Srinath is a Sri Lankan Tamil politician. He was elected to the Sri Lankan Parliament from Batticaloa Electoral District as a member of the Ilankai Tamil Arasu Kachchi.
