= Tamil Eelam Liberation Organization =

Tamil Eelam Liberation Organization தமிழ் ஈழ விடுதலை இயக்கம் දෙමළ ඊලාම් විමුක්ති සංවිධානය
- President: Selvam Adaikalanathan
- Secretary: G. Karunakaran
- Founder: Nadarajah Thangathurai, Selvarajah Yogachandran (Kuttimani)
- Founded: 1969 (organisation); 1987 (political party)
- Headquarters: 34 Ammankovil Road, Pandarikulam, Vavuniya
- Ideology: Tamil nationalism
- National affiliation: Democratic Tamil National Alliance
- Parliament: 1 / 225

Election symbol
- Light House

Party flag

Website
- telo.org

The Tamil Eelam Liberation Organization (TELO) is a Sri Lankan Tamil political party and former militant group. Initially, the TELO campaigned for the establishment of an independent Tamil Eelam in northeastern Sri Lanka from 1972 to 1987, until it later accepted the December 19th proposals. The TELO was originally established as a militant group, and functioned as such until 1986, when most of its membership was killed in a conflict with the Liberation Tigers of Tamil Eelam (LTTE). The surviving members of the TELO reorganised themselves as a political party which continues to function as such today.

The TELO currently has one representative in Parliament. It is part of the Democratic Tamil National Alliance.

== Early history ==
The TELO evolved out of the group of Tamil student radicals formed by Nadarajah Thangathurai and Selvarajah Yogachandran (better known by his nom de guerre Kuttimani) in the late 1960s. The group formally constituted itself into an organisation in 1979, inspired in part by the LTTE and the Eelam Revolutionary Organisation of Students (EROS). Soon, it had become the most effective of the Tamil militant groups.

Both Thangathurai and Kuttimani were captured by the Sri Lankan Army in 1981 while they were in the process of escaping to India. For a while after their arrest, the TELO was led by Sri Sabaratnam as the de facto leader.

== India and the Eelam National Liberation Front ==
The TELO was thereafter relatively dormant until 1983. On 25 July 1983, both Thangathurai and Kuttimani were brutally tortured and killed in a prison riot by Sinhalese prisoners. Sri Sabaratnam then became its head. The trained cadre would be supplied with weaponry, and sent to Sri Lanka to wage a guerrilla war against the army.

In February 1984, the TELO together with the EROS and the Eelam People's Revolutionary Liberation Front (EPRLF) set up a common militant front for the Eelam struggle, which was called the Eelam National Liberation Front, or ENLF. The LTTE joined the ENLF in April that year. In co-ordination, the groups began carrying out attacks against government positions in Jaffna. The TELO used its arms to destroy the main police station in Jaffna, and attack military convoys. The combined assaults led to the near-total disappearance of government authority in Jaffna.

== Internal dissension and the conflict with the LTTE ==
As a leader, however, Sri Sabaratnam lacked the charisma which the likes of Prabhakaran had, and he was unable to convey the sense of vision to the TELO which the LTTE had. As a result, the TELO's rapid growth was not backed up by a strong ideology like the LTTE's had been, and a number of its cadre were seen as bullies. Sri Sabaratnam, relying heavily on his association with and support by India, had not acquired the sort of advanced modern weaponry that the LTTE had, and the group therefore began losing its effectiveness. A number of TELO members became unhappy with Sri Sabaratnam's leadership, and dissension grew in the ranks. By 1985, a number of factions had emerged in the TELO. The rivalry between the factions led to the murder of Dass, one of the factional leaders, in April 1986. This led to a split in the organisation, with several dozen members leaving.

In the meantime, differences with the LTTE were also growing. The LTTE was unhappy with the pro-India stance of the TELO. They also were upset that the TELO was getting by far the largest share of contributions from Sri Lankan Tamil expatriates, even though the TELO was not as active or successful as the LTTE. Prabhakaran also feared that India would use the TELO to have him killed.

Matters came to a head with the assassination of two prominent Tamil politicians in Jaffna, M. Alalasundaram and V. Dharmalingam, in September 1985. The TELO and the LTTE blamed each other for the killings. In February 1986, the LTTE pulled out of the ENLF. On 29 April that year, they launched an all-out assault on the TELO. TELO bases across Jaffna were shelled with mortars. TELO cadres, whether armed or unarmed, came under rifle attack and were shot dead. No quarter was given, according to eyewitnesses. Those who surrendered were shot dead as they laid down their weapons, and those who attempted to flee were shot as they ran. Civilians were warned not to shelter fugitives. The few TELO cadres who managed to find refuge with other armed groups such as the EPRLF or the EROS were nearly the only ones who survived. On 5 May, the TELO's leader Sri Sabaratnam was shot dead by Kittu (Sathasivam Krishnakumar) of the LTTE. In all, over one hundred and twenty five men had been killed, and the TELO had been virtually wiped out.

The LTTE at the time justified its actions as necessary, arguing that the TELO was being used by India to infiltrate the Eelam struggle and reshape it to its own ends. Several years later, however, in 1990, Kittu, who had directed and led the massacres, admitted that it had been a mistake to kill the cadres of the TELO, although the assassination of the top leaders was justified.

Some attempts were made during the Indian Peace Keeping Force (IPKF) period to revive the TELO as a militant group, and to avenge those killed by the LTTE. They were assisted by the Indian Army, which armed them and used them to try to contain the LTTE, who opposed the IPKF presence. However, they came under constant LTTE attack and suffered heavy casualties, losing as many as 70 in a single attack in September 1987. Once the IPKF withdrew, the military strength of these groups melted away, with most of their members surrendering to the LTTE in fear of reprisals. Since then, the TELO has never revived as an effective militant group.

== The TELO as a political party ==
After the killing of Sri Sabaratnam, Selvam Adaikalanathan became the leader of the TELO. Following the melting away of its cadre after the IPKF's withdrawal, he decided that the TELO would never recover and therefore eventually reconstituted it as a political party.

TELO formed an alliance with the Eelam National Democratic Liberation Front, EPRLF and Tamil United Liberation Front to contest the 1989 parliamentary elections. The alliance won 188,593 votes (3.40%), securing 10 of the 225 seats in Parliament. 2 of the 10 alliance MPs were from TELO.

TELO formed an alliance with EROS and People's Liberation Organisation of Tamil Eelam to contest the 1994 parliamentary elections. The alliance won 38,028 votes (0.48%), securing 3 of the 225 seats in Parliament. None of the 3 alliance MPs were from TELO.

At the 2000 parliamentary elections TELO contested on its own and won 26,112 votes (0.30%), securing 3 of the 225 seats in Parliament.

The TELO maintained an ambivalent position with relation to the LTTE for some years, but starting from the mid-1990s, it began to take an increasingly pro-LTTE stand. In 2001, it joined the Tamil National Alliance, a coalition of pro-independence Tamil parties, which supported, and was supported by, the LTTE. In an interview, Adaikkalanathan explained the contradiction behind the TELO supporting a group to which it was once opposed. While the TELO does not accept internecine killing and can never forget what the LTTE has done, he says it would be betraying the Tamil people to oppose the LTTE, because victory could only be achieved if all Tamil groups set aside their differences and present a united front.

=== 2001 Parliamentary General Election ===
In the first parliamentary election contested by the Tamil National Alliance, the 5 December 2001 election, the TNA led by Rajavarothiam Sampanthan won 3.88% of the popular vote and 15 out of 225 seats in the Sri Lankan parliament.

Votes and seats won by TNA by electoral district

Electoral District	Votes	%	Seats	Turnout	TNA MPs
Ampara	48,789	17.41%	1	82.51%	A. Chandranehru (TULF)
Batticaloa	86,284	48.17%	3	68.20%	G. Krishnapillai (ACTC); Joseph Pararajasingham (TULF); Thambiraja Thangavadivel (TELO)
Colombo	12,696	1.20%	0	76.31%	
Jaffna	102,324	54.84%	6	31.14%	V. Anandasangaree (TULF); Gajendrakumar Ponnambalam (ACTC); Nadarajah Raviraj (TULF); Mavai Senathirajah (TULF); M. K. Shivajilingam (TELO); A. Vinayagamoorthy (ACTC)
Trincomalee	56,121	34.83%	1	79.88%	R. Sampanthan (TULF)
Vanni	41,950	44.39%	3	46.77%	Selvam Adaikalanathan (TELO); Sivasakthy Ananthan (EPRLF); Irasa Kuhaneswaran (TELO)
National List			1		M. Sivasithamparam (TULF), died 5 June 2002; K. Thurairetnasingam (TULF) (replaces M. Sivasithamparam)
Total	348,164	3.88%	15	76.03%	
Source:"Parliamentary General Election 2001, Final District Results". Department of Elections, Sri Lanka.

=== 2004 Parliamentary General Election ===
In the 2 April 2004 parliamentary election in which the United People's Freedom Alliance led by President Kumaratunga came to power, the Tamil National Alliance led by Rajavarothiam Sampanthan won 6.84% of the popular vote and 22 out of 225 seats in the Sri Lankan parliament.

Votes and seats won by TNA by electoral district

Electoral District	Votes	%	Seats	Turnout	TNA MPs
Ampara	55,533	19.13%	1	81.42%	K. Pathmanathan, died 21 May 2009; Thomas Thangathurai William, from 12 June 2009 (replaces K. Pathmanathan)
Batticaloa	161,011	66.71%	4	83.58%	Senathirajah Jeyanandamoorthy; Thanmanpillai Kanagasabai; Thangeswary Kathiraman; Kingsley Rasanayagam, resigned April 2004; P. Ariyanethiran, from 18 May 2004 (replaces Kingsley Rasanayagam)
Jaffna	257,320	90.60%	8	47.38%	Selvarajah Kajendren; Gajendrakumar Ponnambalam (ACTC); Suresh Premachandran (EPRLF); Nadarajah Raviraj (ITAK), murdered 10 November 2006; Mavai Senathirajah (ITAK); M. K. Shivajilingam (TELO); K. Sivanesan, murdered 6 March 2008; Pathmini Sithamparanathan; Nallathamby Srikantha (TELO), from 30 November 2006 (replaces Nadarajah Raviraj); Solomon Cyril, from 9 April 2008 (replaces Kidnan Sivanesan)
Trincomalee	68,955	37.72%	2	85.44%	R. Sampanthan (ITAK); K. Thurairetnasingam (ITAK)
Vanni	90,835	64.71%	5	66.64%	Selvam Adaikalanathan (TELO); Sivasakthy Ananthan (EPRLF); Sathasivam Kanagaratnam; Sivanathan Kisshor; Vino Noharathalingam (TELO)
National List			2		M. K. Eelaventhan, expelled from Parliament 14 December 2007 for non-attendance Joseph Pararajasingham (ITAK), murdered 24 December 2005; Chandra Nehru Chandrakanthan, from 27 September 2006 (replaces Joseph Pararajasingham); Raseen Mohammed Imam, from 5 February 2008 (replaces M. K. Eelaventhan)
Total	633,654	6.84%	22	75.96%	
Source:"Parliamentary General Election 2004, Final District Results". Department of Elections, Sri Lanka.

=== 2010 Parliamentary General Election ===
In the 2010 Sri Lankan parliamentary election, in which the United People's Freedom Alliance , led by Mahinda Rajapaksa, retained power, the Tamil National Alliance, led by Rajavarothiam Sampanthan, won 2.9% of the popular vote and 14 out of 225 seats in the Sri Lankan parliament.

Votes and seats won by the TNA by electoral district

Electoral District	Votes	%	Seats	Turnout	TNA MPs
Ampara	26,895	10.47%	1	64.74%	Podiappuhamy Piyasena
Batticaloa	66,235	36.67%	3	58.56%	P. Ariyanethiran (ITAK); P. Selvarasa (ITAK); S. Yogeswaran (ITAK)
Jaffna	65,119	43.85%	5	23.33%	Suresh Premachandran (EPRLF); E. Saravanapavan (ITAK); Mavai Senathirajah (ITAK); S. Sritharan (ITAK); A. Vinayagamoorthy
Trincomalee	33,268	23.81%	1	62.20%	R. Sampanthan (ITAK)
Vanni	41,673	38.96%	3	43.89%	Selvam Adaikalanathan (TELO); Sivasakthy Ananthan (EPRLF); Vino Noharathalingam (TELO)
National List			1		M. A. Sumanthiran (ITAK)
Total	233,190	2.90%	14	61.26%	
Source:"Parliamentary General Election – 2010". Department of Elections, Sri Lanka.
