= P. Selvarasa =

Sri Lankan politician (born 1946)

Hon. P. Selvarasa
- பொன். செல்வராசா

Member of Parliament for Batticaloa District
- In office 1994–2000
- In office 2010–2015

Personal details
- Born: 25 July 1946 (age 80)
- Party: Illankai Tamil Arasu Kachchi
- Other political affiliations: Tamil National Alliance
- Occupation: Retired government officer
- Ethnicity: Sri Lankan Tamil
- Religion: Hindu

Ponnambalam Selvarasa (Tamil: பொன்னம்பலம் செல்வராசா; born 25 July 1946) is a Sri Lankan Tamil politician and former Member of Parliament.

== Early life ==
Selvarasa was born on 25 July 1946.

== Career ==
Selvarasa was one of the Tamil United Liberation Front's candidates for Batticaloa District at the 1994 parliamentary election. He was elected and entered Parliament. He failed to get re-elected at the 2000 parliamentary election.

On 20 October 2001 the All Ceylon Tamil Congress, Eelam People's Revolutionary Liberation Front, Tamil Eelam Liberation Organization and TULF formed the Tamil National Alliance (TNA). Selvarasa contested the 2010 parliamentary election as one of the TNA's candidates in Batticaloa District. He was elected and re-entered Parliament. He failed to get re-elected at the 2015 parliamentary election.

== Electoral history ==
Electoral history of P. Selvarasa
Election	Constituency	Party	Votes	Result
1994 parliamentary	Batticaloa District	TULF	17,450	Elected
2000 parliamentary	Batticaloa District	TULF		Not elected
2010 parliamentary	Batticaloa District	TNA	18,485	Elected
2015 parliamentary	Batticaloa District	TNA		Not elected
