= Kandasami Prabhu =

Sri Lankan politician

Hon. Kandasami Prabhu MP

Member of Parliament for Batticaloa Electoral District
- Incumbent
- Assumed office 15 November 2024

Personal details
- Party: National People's Power
- Profession: Politician

Kandasami Prabhu also spelt Kandasamy is a Sri Lankan politician. He was elected to the Sri Lankan Parliament from Batticaloa Electoral District as a member of the National People's Power.
