= G. Krishnapillai =

Sri Lankan politician

Honourable G. Krishnapillai MPC

Member of Parliament for Batticaloa District
- In office 2001–2004

Member of the Eastern Provincial Council for Batticaloa District
- Incumbent
- Assumed office 2012

Personal details
- Party: Tamil United Liberation Front
- Other political affiliations: Tamil National Alliance
- Ethnicity: Sri Lankan Tamil

Gnanamuttu Krishnapillai (alias Vellimalai) is a Sri Lankan Tamil politician, provincial councillor and former Member of Sri Lankan Parliament.

Krishnapillai contested the 2001 parliamentary election as one of the Tamil National Alliance's candidates in Batticaloa District and was elected to Parliament. He contested the 2012 provincial council election as one of the TNA's candidates in Batticaloa District and was elected to the Eastern Provincial Council (EPC). A few days after the election some TNA councillors including Krishnapillai were threatened and coerced into joining the United People's Freedom Alliance but none of them gave in to the threats. Krishnapillai and the other newly elected TNA provincial councillors took their oaths on 28 September 2012 in front of TNA leader and Member of Parliament R. Sampanthan.
