= K. Pathmanathan =

Sri Lankan politician (1948–2009)

Hon. K. Pathmanathan MP

Member of Parliament for Ampara District
- In office 2004–2009
- Succeeded by: T.T. William, TNA

Personal details
- Born: 30 May 1948
- Died: 21 May 2009 (aged 60) Madurai, Tamil Nadu, India
- Party: Tamil National Alliance
- Occupation: District Manager, National Housing Development Authority

Kanagasabai Pathmanathan was a Sri Lankan Tamil politician and Member of Parliament.

Pathmanathan was one of the Tamil National Alliance's candidates in Ampara District at the 2004 parliamentary election. He was elected and entered Parliament.

Pathmanathan died on 21 May 2009 after a brief illness.
