= Thangeswary Kathiraman =

Sri Lankan politician (1952–2019)

Hon. Thangeswary Kathiraman

Member of Parliament for Batticaloa District
- In office 2004–2010

Personal details
- Born: 26 February 1952
- Died: 26 October 2019 (aged 67)
- Party: United People's Freedom Alliance
- Occupation: District Cultural Officer

Thangeswary Kathiraman (26 February 1952 – 26 October 2019) was a Sri Lankan Tamil politician who served as Member of Parliament.

In 2004 Thangeswary was selected by the Tamil Tigers as a Tamil National Alliance (TNA) parliamentary candidate. Thangeswary represented the Batticaloa multi-member electoral district for the TNA in the Sri Lankan Parliament between April 2004 and February 2010.

In 2010, after the Tamil Tigers' defeat in the civil war, the TNA deselected most of its Tamil Tiger appointed MPs, including Thangeswary. She subsequently joined the governing United People's Freedom Alliance (UPFA) and stood as one of its candidates in Batticaloa District in the 2010 parliamentary election. She failed to get elected, coming eighth and last amongst the UPFA candidates.
