= S. Yogeswaran =

Sri Lankan politician

Hon. S. Yogeswaran MP
- சீ. யோகேஸ்வரன்
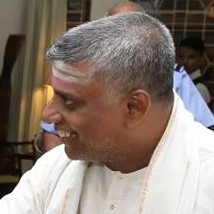
- Yogeswaran in February 2017

Member of Parliament for Batticaloa District
- Incumbent
- Assumed office 8 April 2010

Personal details
- Born: 26 April 1970 (age 55)
- Party: Illankai Tamil Arasu Kachchi
- Other political affiliations: Tamil National Alliance
- Ethnicity: Sri Lankan Tamil

Seeniththamby Yogeswaran (Tamil: சீனித்தம்பி யோகேஸ்வரன்; born 26 April 1970) is a Sri Lankan Tamil politician and Member of Parliament.

== Early life ==
Yogeswaran was born on 26 April 1970.

== Career ==
Yogeswaran was one of the Tamil National Alliance's candidates for Batticaloa District at the 2010 parliamentary election. He was elected and entered Parliament. He was re-elected at the 2015 parliamentary election.

== Electoral history ==
Electoral history of S. Yogeswaran
Election	Constituency	Party	Votes	Result
2010 parliamentary	Batticaloa District	TNA	20,569	Elected
2015 parliamentary	Batticaloa District	TNA	34,049	Elected
