= Podiappuhamy Piyasena =

Sri Lankan politician

Hon. Podiappuhamy Piyasena MP
- පොඩි අප්පුහාම් පියසේන பொடியப்புகாமி பியசேன

Member of Parliament for Ampara District
- In office 2010–2015

Personal details
- Born: 3 April 1961 (age 65)
- Party: United People's Freedom Alliance

Podiappuhamy H. P. Piyasena (born 3 April 1961) is a Sri Lankan politician and former Member of Parliament.

== Early life ==
Piyasena was born on 3 April 1961.

== Career ==
Piyasena was one of the Tamil National Alliance's candidates in Ampara District at the 2010 parliamentary election. He was elected and entered Parliament. Piyasena was the first Sinhalese to be elected parliament from a Tamil political party (his father is Sinhalese and his mother is Tamil).

In September 2010 Piyasena defected to the ruling United People's Freedom Alliance (UPFA). He was one of the UPFA's candidates in Ampara District at the 2015 parliamentary election but failed to get re-elected after coming eighth amongst the UPFA candidates.

== Electoral history ==
Electoral history of Podiappuhamy Piyasena
Election	Constituency	Party	Votes	Result
2010 parliamentary	Ampara District	TNA	11,139	Elected
2015 parliamentary	Ampara District	UPFA	4,901	Not elected
