= 2012 Sri Lankan provincial council elections =

6th Sri Lankan provincial council election
- 8 September 2012

114 seats across 3 provincial councils
- Turnout: 64.10%
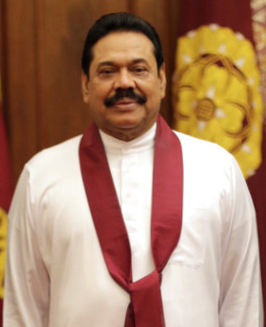

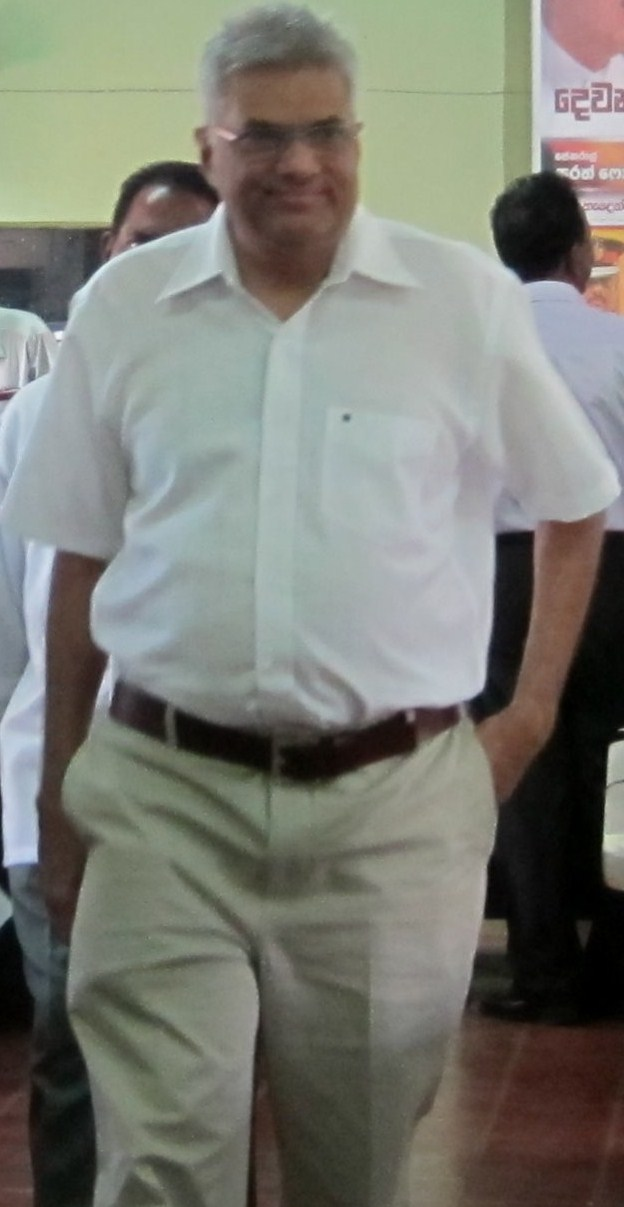

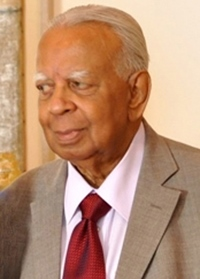

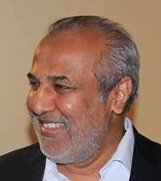
	Majority party	Minority party
Leader	Mahinda Rajapaksa	Ranil Wickremasinghe
Party	UPFA	UNP
Popular vote	1,027,310	557,885
Percentage	51.05%	27.72%
Councillors	63	29
Councils	2	0
	Third party	Fourth party
Leader	R. Sampanthan	Rauff Hakeem
Party	TNA	Sri Lanka Muslim Congress
Popular vote	193,827	132,917
Percentage	9.63%	6.61%
Councillors	11	7
Councils	0	0
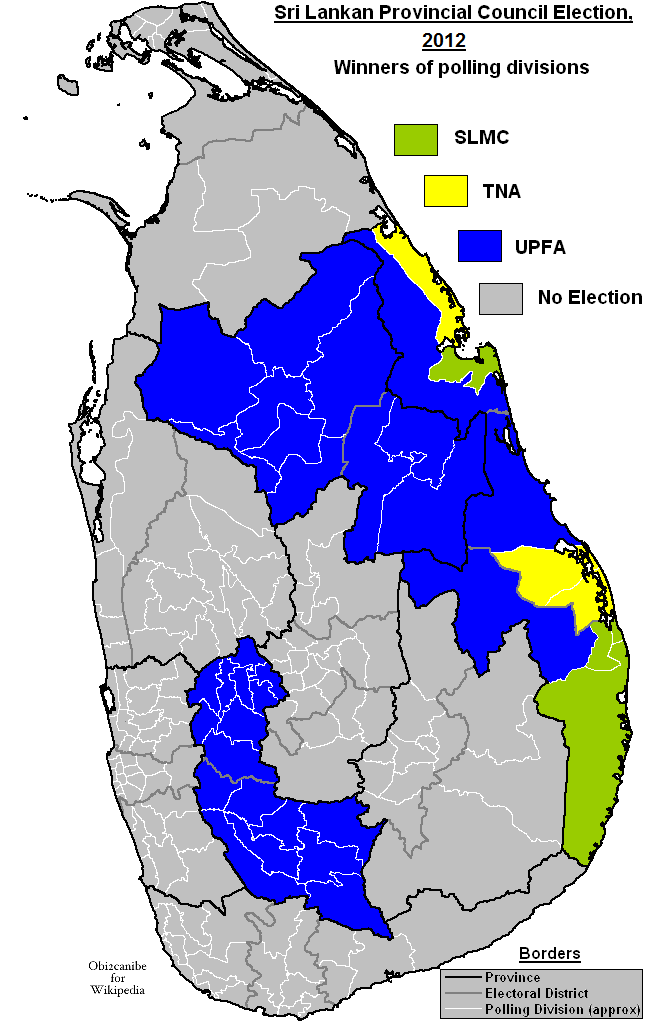
- Winners of polling divisions. UPFA in blue, TNA in yellow and SLMC in green.

Provincial council elections were held in Sri Lanka on 8 September 2012 to elect 114 members to three of the nine provincial councils in the country. 3.3 million Sri Lankans were eligible to vote in the election. Elections for the Northern Provincial Council, which had been governed directly by the national government since it was demerged from the North Eastern Provincial Council in January 2007, are overdue but the government has not set a date. Elections to the remaining five provincial councils are not due till 2014 as they had their last election in 2009.

The United People's Freedom Alliance's domination of Sri Lankan elections continued as expected. It retained control of two provincial councils (North Central and Sabaragamuwa) but lost overall control in the other provincial council (Eastern), although it was the largest group.

== Background ==
In an attempt to end the Sri Lankan Civil War the Indo-Lanka Accord was signed on 29 July 1987. One of the requirements of the accord was that the Sri Lankan government to devolve powers to the provinces. Accordingly on 14 November 1987 the Sri Lankan Parliament passed the 13th Amendment to the 1978 Constitution of Sri Lanka and the Provincial Councils Act No 42 of 1987. On 3 February 1988 nine provincial councils were created by order. The first elections for provincial councils took place on 28 April 1988 in North Central, North Western, Sabaragamuwa, and Uva provinces. On 2 June 1988 elections were held for provincial councils for Central, Southern and Western provinces. The United National Party (UNP), which was in power nationally, won control of all seven provincial councils.

The Indo-Lanka Accord also required the merger of the Eastern and Northern provinces into one administrative unit. The accord required a referendum to be held by 31 December 1988 in the Eastern Province to decide whether the merger should be permanent. Crucially, the accord allowed the Sri Lankan president to postpone the referendum at his discretion. On September 2 and 8 1988 President Jayewardene issued proclamations enabling the Eastern and Northern provinces to be one administrative unit administered by one elected council, creating the North Eastern Province. Elections in the newly merged North Eastern Province were held on 19 November 1988. The Eelam People's Revolutionary Liberation Front, an Indian backed paramilitary group, won control of the North Eastern provincial council.

On 1 March 1990, just as the Indian Peace Keeping Force were preparing to withdraw from Sri Lanka, Annamalai Varatharajah Perumal, Chief Minister of the North Eastern Province, moved a motion in the North Eastern Provincial Council declaring an independent Eelam. President Premadasa reacted to Permual's UDI by dissolving the provincial council and imposing direct rule on the province.

The 2nd Sri Lankan provincial council election was held in 1993 in seven provinces. The UNP retained control of six provincial councils but lost control of the largest provincial council, Western, to the opposition People's Alliance. A special election was held in Southern Province in 1994 after some UNP provincial councillors defected to the opposition. The PA won the election and took control of the Southern Provincial Council.

The 3rd Sri Lankan provincial council election was held in 1999 in seven provinces. The PA, which was now in power nationally, managed to win the majority of seats in two provinces (North Central and North Western). It was also able to form a majority administration in the other five provinces with the support of smaller parties such as the Ceylon Workers' Congress (CWC) . The UNP regained control of the Central Provincial Council in 2002 after the CWC councillors crossed over to the opposition.

The 4th Sri Lankan provincial council election was held in 2004 in seven provinces. The United People's Freedom Alliance (UPFA), the successor to the PA, won all seven provinces.

The 5th Sri Lankan provincial council election was held in 2008/09 in eight provinces. The UPFA won all eight provinces.

== Results ==
=== Overall ===
The UPFA won control of two provincial councils (North Central and North Central). There was no overall control in the other provincial council (Eastern) but the UPFA was the largest group.

Alliances and parties	Votes	%	Seats	Councils
United People's Freedom Alliance: All Ceylon Muslim Congress; Ceylon Workers' Congress; Communist Party of Sri Lanka; Eelam People's Democratic Party; Jathika Hela Urumaya; Lanka Sama Samaja Party; Mahajana Eksath Peramuna; National Congress; National Freedom Front; Sri Lanka Freedom Party; Sri Lanka Muslim Congress; Tamil Makkal Viduthalai Pulikal	1,027,310	51.05%	63	2
United National Party	557,885	27.72%	29	0
Tamil National Alliance: Eelam People's Revolutionary Liberation Front; Illankai Tamil Arasu Kachchi; People's Liberation Organisation of Tamil Eelam; Tamil Eelam Liberation Organization; Tamil United Liberation Front	193,827	9.63%	11	0
Sri Lanka Muslim Congress	132,917	6.61%	7	0
Ceylon Workers' Congress: Ceylon Workers' Congress; Democratic People's Front; Up-Country People's Front	25,985	1.29%	2	0
Janatha Vimukthi Peramuna	31,384	1.56%	1	0
National Freedom Front	9,522	0.47%	1	0
Independent lists	23,625	1.17%	0	0
Eelavar Democratic Front	2,693	0.13%	0	0
Socialist Alliance: Communist Party of Sri Lanka; Democratic Left Front; Lanka Sama Samaja Party	2,480	0.12%	0	0
United Lanka People's Party	595	0.03%	0	0
United Socialist Party	485	0.02%	0	0
All Lanka Tamil United Front	460	0.02%	0	0
Sri Lanka Labour Party	449	0.02%	0	0
United Lanka Great Council	597	0.03%	0	0
Jana Setha Peramuna	398	0.02%	0	0
Patriotic National Front	334	0.02%	0	0
Nava Sama Samaja Party	286	0.01%	0	0
Ruhuna People's Party	204	0.01%	0	0
National Development Front	203	0.01%	0	0
Our National Front	163	0.01%	0	0
New Sinhala Heritage	148	0.01%	0	0
All Are Citizens, All Are Kings Organisation	145	0.01%	0	0
Socialist Equality Party	86	0.00%	0	0
Liberal Party	74	0.00%	0	0
Muslim Liberation Front	57	0.00%	0	0
No overall control				1
Valid Votes	2,012,312	100.00%	114	3
Rejected Votes	126,427			
Total Polled	2,138,739			
Registered Electors	3,336,417			
Turnout	64.10%			

=== Eastern Province ===
Results of the 2nd Eastern Provincial Council election held on 8 September 2012:

Alliances and parties	Ampara			Batticaloa			Trincomalee			Bonus Seats	Total		
Alliances and parties	Votes	%	Seats	Votes	%	Seats	Votes	%	Seats	Bonus Seats	Votes	%	Seats
United People's Freedom Alliance	92,530	33.66%	5	64,190	31.17%	4	43,324	28.38%	3	2	200,044	31.58%	14
Tamil National Alliance	44,749	16.28%	2	104,682	50.83%	6	44,396	29.08%	3	0	193,827	30.59%	11
Sri Lanka Muslim Congress	83,658	30.43%	4	23,083	11.21%	1	26,176	17.15%	2	0	132,917	20.98%	7
United National Party	48,028	17.47%	3	2,434	1.18%	0	24,439	16.01%	1	0	74,901	11.82%	4
Independent lists	1,178	0.43%	0	9,019	4.38%	0	2,164	1.42%	0	0	12,361	1.95%	0
National Freedom Front							9,522	6.24%	1	0	9,522	1.50%	1
Janatha Vimukthi Peramuna	2,305	0.84%	0	72	0.03%	0	777	0.51%	0	0	3,154	0.50%	0
Eelavar Democratic Front	531	0.19%	0	1,777	0.86%	0	385	0.25%	0	0	2,693	0.43%	0
Socialist Alliance	1,489	0.54%	0	379	0.18%	0	612	0.40%	0	0	2,480	0.39%	0
All Lanka Tamil United Front	76	0.03%	0				384	0.25%	0	0	460	0.07%	0
United Socialist Party	103	0.04%	0	37	0.02%	0	149	0.10%	0	0	289	0.05%	0
Sri Lanka Labour Party	111	0.04%	0	50	0.02%	0	107	0.07%	0	0	268	0.04%	0
Our National Front				163	0.08%	0				0	163	0.03%	0
United Lanka Great Council	10	0.00%	0	15	0.01%	0	97	0.06%	0	0	122	0.02%	0
United Lanka People's Party	74	0.03%	0	16	0.01%	0				0	90	0.01%	0
Jana Setha Peramuna	31	0.01%	0	19	0.01%	0	35	0.02%	0	0	85	0.01%	0
Patriotic National Front	7	0.00%	0				78	0.05%	0	0	85	0.01%	0
Muslim Liberation Front	42	0.02%	0				15	0.01%	0	0	57	0.01%	0
Ruhuna People's Party	13	0.00%	0				3	0.00%	0	0	16	0.00%	0
Valid Votes	274,935	100.00%	14	205,936	100.00%	11	152,663	100.00%	10	2	633,534	100.00%	37
Rejected Votes	16,744			17,223			11,324				45,291		
Total Polled	291,679			223,159			163,987				678,825		
Registered Electors	441,287			347,099			245,363				1,033,749		
Turnout	66.10%			64.29%			66.83%				65.67%		

=== North Central Province ===
Results of the 6th North Central Provincial Council election held on 8 September 2012:

Alliances and parties	Anuradhapura			Polonnaruwa			Bonus Seats	Total		
Alliances and parties	Votes	%	Seats	Votes	%	Seats	Bonus Seats	Votes	%	Seats
United People's Freedom Alliance	234,387	62.71%	13	104,165	58.15%	6	2	338,552	61.23%	21
United National Party	126,184	33.76%	7	69,943	39.04%	4	0	196,127	35.47%	11
Janatha Vimukthi Peramuna	11,684	3.13%	1	4,382	2.45%	0	0	16,066	2.91%	1
Independent lists	912	0.24%	0	272	0.15%	0	0	1,184	0.21%	0
United Lanka People's Party	226	0.06%	0				0	226	0.04%	0
Jana Setha Peramuna	178	0.05%	0	42	0.02%	0	0	220	0.04%	0
United Socialist Party				196	0.11%	0	0	196	0.04%	0
United Lanka Great Council	53	0.01%	0	91	0.05%	0	0	144	0.03%	0
Sri Lanka Labour Party	54	0.01%	0	20	0.01%	0	0	74	0.01%	0
Patriotic National Front	53	0.01%	0	19	0.01%	0	0	72	0.01%	0
Ruhuna People's Party	51	0.01%	0	16	0.01%	0	0	67	0.01%	0
Valid Votes	373,782	100.00%	21	179,146	100.00%	10	2	552,928	100.00%	33
Rejected Votes	18,218			9,792				28,010		
Total Polled	392,000			188,938				580,938		
Registered Electors	606,508			294,365				900,873		
Turnout	64.63%			64.18%				64.49%		

=== Sabaragamuwa Province ===
Results of the 6th Sabaragamuwa Provincial Council election held on 8 September 2012:

Alliances and parties	Kegalle			Ratnapura			Bonus Seats	Total		
Alliances and parties	Votes	%	Seats	Votes	%	Seats	Bonus Seats	Votes	%	Seats
United People's Freedom Alliance	213,734	58.08%	11	274,980	60.06%	15	2	488,714	59.18%	28
United National Party	130,417	35.44%	6	156,440	34.17%	8	0	286,857	34.73%	14
Ceylon Workers' Congress	8,971	2.44%	1	17,014	3.72%	1	0	25,985	3.15%	2
Janatha Vimukthi Peramuna	4,519	1.23%	0	7,645	1.67%	0	0	12,164	1.47%	0
Independent lists	9,356	2.54%	0	724	0.16%	0	0	10,080	1.22%	0
United Lanka Great Council	239	0.06%	0	92	0.02%	0	0	331	0.04%	0
Nava Sama Samaja Party	87	0.02%	0	199	0.04%	0	0	286	0.03%	0
United Lanka People's Party				279	0.06%	0	0	279	0.03%	0
National Development Front	203	0.06%	0				0	203	0.02%	0
Patriotic National Front	106	0.03%	0	71	0.02%	0	0	177	0.02%	0
New Sinhala Heritage				148	0.03%	0	0	148	0.02%	0
All Are Citizens, All Are Kings Organisation	70	0.02%	0	75	0.02%	0	0	145	0.02%	0
Ruhuna People's Party	46	0.01%	0	75	0.02%	0	0	121	0.01%	0
Sri Lanka Labour Party	70	0.02%	0	37	0.01%	0	0	107	0.01%	0
Jana Setha Peramuna	93	0.03%	0				0	93	0.01%	0
Socialist Equality Party	86	0.02%	0				0	86	0.01%	0
Liberal Party				74	0.02%	0	0	74	0.01%	0
Valid Votes	367,997	100.00%	18	457,853	100.00%	24	2	825,850	100.00%	44
Rejected Votes	29,065			24,061				53,126		
Total Polled	397,062			481,914				878,976		
Registered Electors	631,981			769,814				1,401,795		
Turnout	62.83%			62.60%				62.70%		
