= Thanmanpillai Kanagasabai =

Sri Lankan politician (1939–2025)

Hon. Thanmanpillai Kanagasabai

Member of Parliament for Batticaloa District
- In office 2004–2010

Personal details
- Born: 20 March 1939
- Died: 19 September 2025 (aged 86)
- Party: Tamil National Alliance
- Occupation: Government officer

Thanmanpillai Kanagasabai (20 March 1939 – 19 September 2025) was a Sri Lankan Tamil politician who served as a Member of Parliament from the Batticaloa District.

In 2004, Kanagasabai was selected by the Liberation Tigers of Tamil Eelam as a parliamentary candidate for the Tamil National Alliance (TNA). Kanagasabai represented the Batticaloa electoral district for the TNA in the Parliament of Sri Lanka from April 2004 to February 2010.

Kanagasabai declined re-nomination for the 2010 parliamentary election. He died on 19 September 2025, at the age of 86.
