= Eelam National Democratic Liberation Front =

- Tamil name: ஈழ தேசிய ஜனநாய விடுதலை முன்னணி
- Secretary: G. Gnanasegeram (Paranthan Rajan)
- Founder: G. Gnanasegeram (Paranthan Rajan)
- Founded: 1987
- Dissolved: August 2011
- Split from: EPRLF, PLOTE, TELO
- Preceded by: Three Stars
- Headquarters: 315, Kandy Rd, Kilinochchi

Election symbol
- Bull

The Eelam National Democratic Liberation Front (ENDLF) was a former Indian-backed Tamil militant group in Sri Lanka. It was formed in 1987 as an amalgamation of splinter groups from other militant groups (Eelam People's Revolutionary Liberation Front, People's Liberation Organisation of Tamil Eelam, Tamil Eelam Liberation Organization). It later became a pro-government paramilitary group and political party. In August 2011, the party was deregistered.

== Formation ==
Gnanapiragasam Gnanasekaran (alias Paranthan Rajan), a leading member of the PLOTE, formed the Three Stars militant group with splinter groups of the TELO and EPRLF after leaving the PLOTE. In 1987, Three Stars merged with a PLOTE splinter group led by Jotheeswaran (alias Kannan) and an EPRLF splinter group led by Douglas Devananda to form the Eelam National Democratic Liberation Front. This was done with the support of the Research and Analysis Wing, the Indian intelligence agency. Devananda left the ENDLF and formed the Eelam People's Democratic Party after the Indo-Sri Lanka Accord was signed.

== Politics ==
The ENDLF was very active during the Indian Peace Keeping Force's occupation of northeast Sri Lanka between 1987 and 1990. It took part in the 1988 North Eastern provincial council election and the 1989 parliamentary election. When the IPKF withdrew from Sri Lanka in 1990, the ENDLF also retreated to India. The ENDLF remained dormant until the defection of LTTE commander Karuna in 2004. Karuna joined the ENDLF and became its president, and the ENDLF soon took a strongly anti-LTTE stance. Karuna has since left the ENDLF but the ENDLF remained a pro-government paramilitary group and political party until its deregistration.
