= S. Jeyanandamoorthy =

Sr Lankan Tamil politician (1965–2026)

The Honourable S. Jeyanandamoorthy
- சே. ஜெயானந்தமூர்த்தி

Member of Parliament for Batticaloa District
- In office 2004–2010

Personal details
- Born: 16 September 1965
- Died: 21 June 2026 (aged 60) Batticaloa, Sri Lanka
- Party: Tamil National Alliance
- Other political affiliations: Sri Lanka Podujana Peramuna; Samagi Jana Balawegaya
- Profession: Teacher

Senathirajah Jeyanandamoorthy (Tamil: சேனாதிராஜா ஜெயானந்தமூர்த்தி; 16 September 1965 – 21 June 2026) was a Sri Lankan Tamil politician who served as a member of parliament.

== Early life ==
Jeyanandamoorthy was born on 16 September 1965.

== Career ==
Jeyanandamoorthy had been a correspondent for Virakesari and TamilNet.

He was selected by the rebel Liberation Tigers of Tamil Eelam (LTTE) to be one of the Tamil National Alliance's (TNA) candidates in Batticaloa District at the 2004 parliamentary election. He was elected and entered Parliament.

Jeyanandamoorthy and his relatives were repeatedly threatened by the Tamil Makkal Viduthalai Pulikal, a Sri Lankan government backed paramilitary group. He subsequently fled to the United Kingdom.

In May 2010, he was elected to the Transnational Constituent Assembly of Tamil Eelam.

== Death ==
Jeyanandamoorthy died on 21 June 2026, at the age of 60.
