= 1994 Sri Lankan parliamentary election =

← 1989	16 August 1994	2000 →

All 225 seats in the Parliament of Sri Lanka 113 seats were needed for a majority
- Turnout: 76.24%
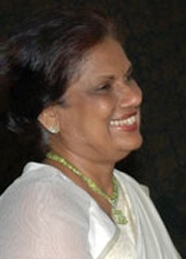
	First party	Second party
		UNP
Leader	Chandrika Kumaratunga	D. B. Wijetunga
Party	People's Alliance	UNP
Leader since	1994	1993
Leader's seat	Gampaha District	n/a
Last election	31.90%, 67 seats (Note: As the Sri Lanka Freedom Party)	50.92%, 125 seats
Seats won	105	94
Seat change	▲38	▼31
Popular vote	3,887,823	3,498,370
Percentage	48.94%	44.04%
Swing	▲17.04pp	▼6.88pp
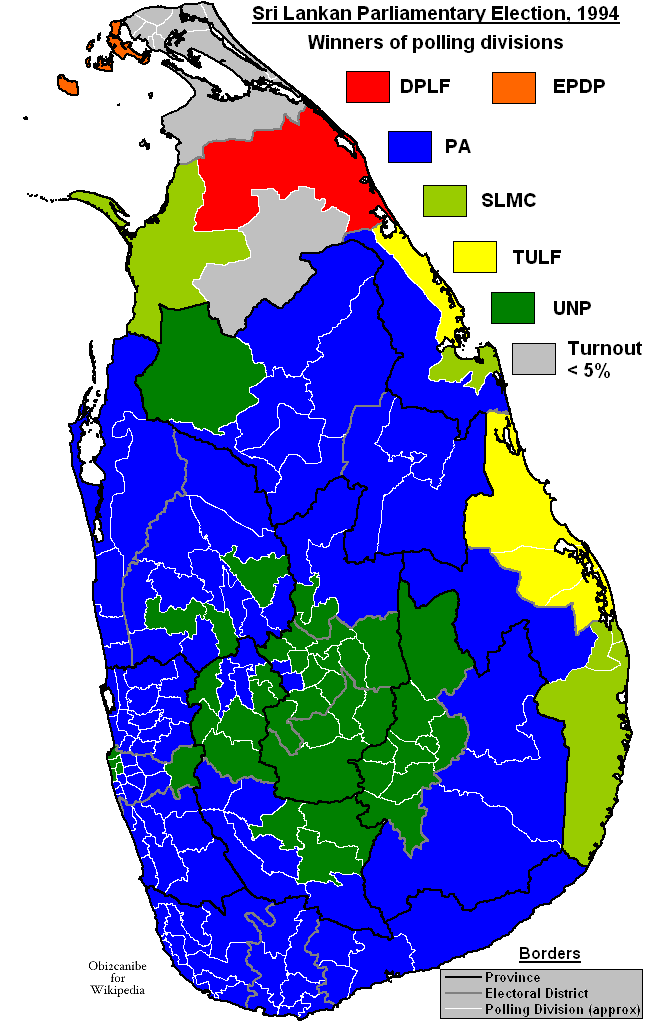
- Winners of polling divisions. PA in blue and UNP in green.
Prime Minister before election
Ranil Wickremasinghe
UNP
Prime Minister-designate
Chandrika Kumaratunga
People's Alliance

Parliamentary elections were held in Sri Lanka on 16 August 1994. They marked the decisive end of seventeen years of United National Party rule and a revival of Sri Lankan democracy.

== Background ==
Democracy in Sri Lanka had seemed doomed as the presidencies of J.R. Jayewardene and Ranasinghe Premadasa arbitrarily banned opposition parties, severely muzzled the media, and routinely used death squads, torture, and kidnappings in the two civil conflicts against the LTTE and JVP. The UNP had simply cancelled the 1983 parliamentary elections; its control of the media led it to victory in the 1988 and 1989 elections.

The population was increasingly tired of war and repression, worn out with jingoistic Sinhalese nationalism, and wanted a return to freedom, peace, and democracy. Chandrika Kumaratunga, leader of the Sri Lanka Freedom Party, formed a coalition with small leftist parties called the People's Alliance. This was in some ways a revival of her mother's coalition from the 1970s, but this time campaigning for rapprochement with the Tamils rather than their marginalization.

== Results ==
The PA did not win a majority, but was able to govern with the support of the smaller parties.

Party	Votes	%	Seats		
Party	Votes	%	District	National	Total
People's Alliance (Note: Consisting of the Communist Party of Sri Lanka, the Desha Vimukthi Janatha Party, the Lanka Sama Samaja Party, the Sri Lanka Freedom Party and Sri Lanka Mahajana Pakshaya.)	3,887,823	48.94	91	14	105
United National Party (Note: Including the Ceylon Workers' Congress.)	3,498,370	44.04	81	13	94
Sri Lanka Muslim Congress	143,307	1.80	6	1	7
Tamil United Liberation Front	132,461	1.67	4	1	5
Sri Lanka Progressive Front (Note: Including the Janatha Vimukthi Peramuna.)	90,078	1.13	1	0	1
Mahajana Eksath Peramuna	68,538	0.86	0	0	0
EROS–PLOTE–TELO (Note: Contested as TELO in Ampara District, Batticaloa District, Colombo District and Trincomalee District; as DPLF in Vanni District and as an independent group in Jaffna District.)	38,028	0.48	3	0	3
Up-Country People's Front (Note: Contested as an independent group in Nuwara Eliya District.)	27,374	0.34	1	0	1
Eelam People's Democratic Party (Note: Contested as an independent group in Jaffna District.)	10,744	0.14	9	0	9
Eelam People's Revolutionary Liberation Front	9,411	0.12	0	0	0
Nava Sama Samaja Party	2,094	0.03	0	0	0
Bahujana Nidahas Peramuna	813	0.01	0	0	0
Democratic Workers Congress	589	0.01	0	0	0
Sinhalaye Mahasammatha Bhoomiputra Pakshaya	267	0.00	0	0	0
Independents	33,809	0.43	0	0	0
Total	7,943,706	100.00	196	29	225
Valid votes	7,943,706	95.20			
Invalid/blank votes	400,389	4.80			
Total votes	8,344,095	100.00			
Registered voters/turnout	10,945,065	76.24			
Source: Electoral Commission

== Legacy ==
The 1994 election did not live up to its great hopes. The PA government was unable to come to an agreement with the LTTE, and ended up prosecuting war just as brutally as its UNP predecessor. The Executive Presidency, which Kumaratunga had promised to abolish, remained as powerful as before.
