= List of Sri Lanka Freedom Party MPs =

This is a list of Sri Lanka Freedom Party MPs. It includes all parliamentarians that were elected to the Parliament of Sri Lanka representing the Sri Lanka Freedom Party from 1951 to onwards. The names in bold are the members of the party that became the President/Prime Minister of Sri Lanka.

== List of Parliamentarians ==
=== A ===
- A. L. Abdul Majeed
- Rohitha Abeygunawardena
- Mahinda Yapa Abeywardena
- M. C. Ahamed
- Lasantha Alagiyawanna
- Mahinda Amaraweera
- Dilum Amunugama
- Sarath Amunugama (politician)
- C. Arulampalam
- M. W. Aruna Pradeep
- Ferial Ashraff

=== B ===
- Tissa Balalla
- **Sirimavo Bandaranaike**
- **S. W. R. D. Bandaranaike**
- S. D. Bandaranayake
- Tharanath Basnayaka
- Bandula Basnayake

=== C ===
- C. A. S. Marikkar
- S. M. Chandrasena
- Reginald Cooray

=== D ===
- Wijaya Dahanayake
- Ananda Dassanayake
- Berty Premalal Dissanayake
- Lalith Dissanayake
- Rohana Dissanayake
- Salinda Dissanayake
- Alfred Duraiappah

=== E ===
- Nandimithra Ekanayake
- Sarath Ekanayake
- T. B. Ekanayake

=== F ===
- Arundika Fernando
- Eraj Ravindra Fernando
- Milroy Fernando
- Jeyaraj Fernandopulle
- A. H. M. Fowzie

=== G ===
- Piyasena Gamage
- Siripala Gamalath
- Sarath Kumara Gunaratna
- Nanda Gunasinghe
- Nandana Gunathilake
- Sarana Gunawardena

=== H ===
- Jayarathna Herath
- Kanaka Herath
- Maheepala Herath

=== J ===
- Sisira Jayakody
- Anuradha Jayaratne
- D. M. Jayaratne
- Piyankara Jayaratne
- Premalal Jayasekara
- Sumedha Jayasena

=== K ===
- Lakshman Kadirgamar
- Jeewan Kumaranatunga

=== M ===
- M. K. A. D. S. Gunawardana
- M. N. Abdul Majeed
- Nandana Mendis
- H. R. Mithrapala
- Mohan De Silva (politician)
- Vinayagamoorthy Muralitharan
- Nishantha Muthuhettigamage

=== N ===
- Hemakumara Nanayakkara
- A. M. M. Naushad
- S. B. Nawinne
- Neranjan Wickremasinghe

=== O ===
- James Peter Obeyesekere III

=== P ===
- Jaya Pathirana
- Felix Perera
- Lakshman Wasantha Perera
- Victor Anthony Perera
- A. P. Jagath Pushpakumara
- Rohana Pushpakumara

=== R ===
- **Mahinda Rajapaksa**
- Namal Rajapaksa
- Nirupama Rajapaksa
- Wijeyadasa Rajapakshe
- Tellipalai Rajaratnam
- Angajan Ramanathan
- Ramesh Pathirana
- Prasanna Ranatunga
- Ruwan Ranatunga
- Jayatissa Ranaweera
- Ranjith de Zoysa
- S. M. Ranjith
- C. B. Rathnayake
- Anuruddha Ratwatte
- Roshan Ranasinghe
- Neil Rupasinghe

=== S ===
- Sanee Rohana Kodithuvakku
- Sarath Chandrasiri Muthukumarana
- Wasantha Senanayake
- John Seneviratne
- Asanka Shehan Semasinghe
- Duminda Silva
- Shan Wijayalal De Silva
- **Maithripala Sirisena**

=== T ===
- Janaka Bandara Tennakoon
- S. Thambirajah
- A. Thiagarajah
- Dayasritha Thissera

=== V ===
- Amith Thenuka Vidanagamage
- Vidura Wickremenayake
- Vijitha Berugoda

=== W ===
- Janaka Wakkumbura
- Pavithra Wanniarachchi
- Wiswa Warnapala
- Gunaratna Weerakoon
- Eric Prasanna Weerawardena
- Kumara Welgama
- Jayantha Wijesekara
- Mahinda Wijesekara
- Duleep Wijesekera

== See also ==
- Sri Lanka Freedom Party history
