= Rajakaruna =

Rajakaruna (Sinhala: රාජකරුණා, romanized: Rājakaruṇā; Tamil: ராஜகருணா) is a Sinhalese surname. Notable people with the surname include:

- Denuwan Rajakaruna (born 1990), Sri Lankan cricketer
- Harshana Rajakaruna (born 1980), Sri Lankan politician
- Sarathchandra Rajakaruna (1940 – 2011), Sri Lankan politician
- Sobitha Rajakaruna, Sri Lankan puisne justice of the Supreme Court
- Upali Rajakaruna (born 1975), Sri Lankan wheelchair tennis player

== See also ==
- Cnemaspis rajakarunai, also known as "Rajakaruna's day gecko", a species of geckos found in Sri Lanka
