= Gampaha Electoral District =

Electoral district of Sri Lanka

Gampaha
- Electoral District for the Parliament of Sri Lanka
- Administrative District: Gampaha
- Province: Western
- Polling divisions: 13
- Population: 2,443,000 (2021)
- Electorate: 1,785,964 (2020)
- Area: 1,387 km^{2} (536 sq mi)

Current Electoral District
- Number of members: 19
- MPs: NPP (16) Vijitha Herath; Anil Jayantha; Mahinda Jayasinghe; Krishantha Abeysena; Muneer Mulaffer; Ashoka Ranwala; Dharmappriya Wijesinghe; Ruwan Mapalagama; Lasith Bashana; Prageeth Maduranga; Champika Hettiarachchi; Ruwanthilake Jayakodi; Hemali Weerasekara; Upul Abeywickrama; Stephani Fernando; Chaminda Lalith Kumara SJB (3) Harshana Rajakaruna; Kavinda Jayawardena; Amila Prasad

Gampaha electoral district is one of the 22 multi-member electoral districts of Sri Lanka created by the 1978 Constitution of Sri Lanka. The district is conterminous with the administrative district of Gampaha in the Western province. The district currently elects 19 of the 225 members of the Sri Lankan Parliament and had 1,785,964 registered electors in 2020. The district is Sri Lanka's Electorate Number 02.

== Polling Divisions ==
The Gampaha Electoral District consists of the following polling divisions:

A: Wattala

B: Negombo

C: Katana

D: Divulapitiya

E: Mirigama

F: Minuwangoda

G: Attanagalla

H. Gampaha

I. Ja-Ela

J. Mahara

K. Dompe

L. Biyagama

M. Kelaniya

== Presidential Elections ==
=== 1982 presidential election ===
Results of the 1st presidential election held on 20 October 1982 for the district:

Candidate	Party	Votes per Polling Division													Postal Votes	Total Votes	%
Candidate	Party	Attanagalla	Biyagma	Divulapitiya	Dompe	Gampaha	Ja Ela	Katana	Kelaniya	Mahara	Minuwangoda	Mirigama	Negombo	Wattala	Postal Votes	Total Votes	%
Junius Jayewardene	UNP	22,531	25,398	25,974	26,573	27,845	32,420	26,504	24,732	25,853	29,672	30,289	30,346	29,387	8,323	365,847	52.50%
Hector Kobbekaduwa	SLFP	31,495	18,539	23,447	27,508	28,532	21,074	22,027	19,050	25,580	25,849	24,143	13,345	15,717	5,502	301,808	43.31%
Rohana Wijeweera	JVP	1,926	1,389	1,547	1,670	1,942	1,683	1,356	2,179	1,952	1,992	3,186	1,049	1,402	428	23,701	3.40%
Colvin R. de Silva	LSSP	272	237	231	247	336	346	334	312	307	260	316	236	232	169	3,835	0.55%
Vasudeva Nanayakkara	NSSP	65	47	79	57	101	157	104	74	69	70	67	127	59	46	1,122	0.16%
Kumar Ponnambalam	ACTC	32	13	28	33	33	29	36	25	17	27	29	97	119	16	534	0.08%
Valid Votes		56,321	45,623	51,306	56,088	58,789	55,709	50,361	46,372	53,778	57,870	58,030	45,200	46,916	14,484	696,847	100.00%
Rejected Votes		430	410	432	519	517	488	437	480	418	399	478	412	425	147	5,992	
Total Polled		56,751	46,033	51,738	56,607	59,306	56,197	50,798	46,852	54,196	58,269	58,508	45,612	47,341	14,631	702,839	
Registered Electors		67,061	55,457	61,494	66,207	72,371	69,624	60,560	58,671	65,660	69,566	70,695	59,884	58,015		835,265	
Turnout		84.63%	83.01%	84.14%	85.50%	81.95%	80.71%	83.88%	79.86%	82.54%	83.76%	82.76%	76.17%	81.60%		84.15%	

=== 1988 presidential election ===
Results of the 2nd presidential election held on 19 December 1988 for the district:

Candidate	Party	Votes per Polling Division													Postal Votes	Total Votes	%
Candidate	Party	Attanagalla	Biyagma	Divulapitiya	Dompe	Gampaha	Ja Ela	Katana	Kelaniya	Mahara	Minuwangoda	Mirigama	Negombo	Wattala	Postal Votes	Total Votes	%
Sirimavo Bandaranaike	SLFP	35,758	23,633	25,857	30,829	34,340	25,357	25,379	22,877	30,305	29,751	27,712	16,601	19,361	7,793	355,553	48.83%
Ranasinghe Premadasa	UNP	22,242	23,930	25,792	26,155	25,948	30,021	28,760	21,395	26,024	29,424	26,835	29,016	27,945	6,605	350,092	48.08%
Ossie Abeygunasekera	SLMP	1,475	1,518	1,055	976	1,839	1,766	2,036	2,700	2,407	1,404	1,074	1,720	1,901	596	22,467	3.09%
Valid Votes		59,475	49,081	52,704	57,960	62,127	57,144	56,175	46,972	58,736	60,579	55,621	47,337	49,207	14,994	728,112	100.00%
Rejected Votes		735	685	742	511	721	1,052	822	690	735	825	860	587	666	477	10,108	
Total Polled		60,210	49,766	53,446	58,471	62,848	58,196	56,997	47,662	59,471	61,404	56,481	47,924	49,873	15,471	738,220	
Registered Electors		79,172	66,166	68,377	72,945	85,424	81,566	76,452	65,961	79,936	78,056	78,953	68,250	68,477		969,735	
Turnout		76.05%	75.21%	78.16%	80.16%	73.57%	71.35%	74.55%	72.26%	74.40%	78.67%	71.54%	70.22%	72.83%		76.13%	

=== 1994 presidential election ===
Results of the 3rd presidential election held on 9 November 1994 for the district:

Candidate	Party	Votes per Polling Division													Postal Votes	Total Votes	%
Candidate	Party	Attanagalla	Biyagma	Divulapitiya	Dompe	Gampaha	Ja Ela	Katana	Kelaniya	Mahara	Minuwangoda	Mirigama	Negombo	Wattala	Postal Votes	Total Votes	%
Chandrika Kumaratunga	PA	51,923	36,459	35,220	39,151	51,197	44,166	42,916	35,601	46,494	42,041	40,288	31,648	37,373	16,177	550,654	64.74%
Srima Dissanayake	UNP	17,437	19,678	23,749	19,920	20,094	24,260	24,637	18,825	21,935	22,839	22,585	22,131	23,671	6,847	288,608	33.93%
Harischandra Wijayatunga	SMBP	374	340	169	228	403	266	184	344	311	299	270	133	183	190	3,694	0.43%
Hudson Samarasinghe	Ind 2	396	201	235	283	215	152	251	151	251	252	248	184	180	20	3,019	0.35%
A. J. Ranasinghe	Ind 1	206	235	149	152	246	236	187	187	235	233	208	172	214	51	2,711	0.32%
Nihal Galappaththi	SLPF	175	127	115	116	147	150	128	107	188	121	222	80	99	57	1,832	0.22%
Valid Votes		70,511	57,040	59,637	59,850	72,302	69,230	68,303	55,215	69,414	65,785	63,821	54,348	61,720	23,342	850,518	100.00%
Rejected Votes		1,065	930	832	867	958	1,141	864	920	1,064	892	1,446	761	922	475	13,137	
Total Polled		71,576	57,970	60,469	60,717	73,260	70,371	69,167	56,135	70,478	66,677	65,267	55,109	62,642	23,817	863,655	
Registered Electors		91,907	80,600	77,104	80,415	100,416	97,305	92,027	78,191	98,091	89,192	89,455	80,589	85,516		1,140,808	
Turnout		77.88%	71.92%	78.43%	75.50%	72.96%	72.32%	75.16%	71.79%	71.85%	74.76%	72.96%	68.38%	73.25%		75.71%	

=== 1999 presidential election ===
Results of the 4th presidential election held on 21 December 1999 for the district:

Candidate	Party	Votes per Polling Division													Postal Votes	Total Votes	%
Candidate	Party	Attanagalla	Biyagma	Divulapitiya	Dompe	Gampaha	Ja Ela	Katana	Kelaniya	Mahara	Minuwangoda	Mirigama	Negombo	Wattala	Postal Votes	Total Votes	%
Chandrika Kumaratunga	PA	51,204	36,550	35,245	39,214	51,606	44,098	45,607	30,947	46,703	42,314	38,075	28,515	32,954	9,764	532,796	56.58%
Ranil Wickramasinghe	UNP	21,709	26,061	27,007	23,857	26,257	29,726	27,389	22,215	27,771	28,328	28,456	28,156	30,566	6,471	353,969	37.59%
Nandana Gunathilake	JVP	3,608	2,825	2,046	2,794	4,433	3,089	2,224	2,940	3,941	3,658	4,213	1,360	2,127	1,214	40,472	4.30%
Harischandra Wijayatunga	SMBP	411	369	215	281	626	236	261	512	402	450	415	106	184	285	4,753	0.50%
Vasudeva Nanayakkara	LDA	125	118	97	97	198	224	171	124	171	106	112	156	279	124	2,102	0.22%
Tennyson Edirisuriya	Ind 1	143	110	107	142	130	112	148	108	113	125	116	111	74	10	1,549	0.16%
W. V. M. Ranjith	Ind 2	133	114	127	137	114	82	125	76	122	134	150	92	83	6	1,495	0.16%
Abdul; Rasool	SLMP	212	94	54	81	63	82	82	103	99	98	198	126	60	2	1,354	0.14%
Rajiva; Wijesinha	LPSL	95	78	100	121	90	72	92	52	103	102	106	74	72	8	1,165	0.12%
Kamal; Karunadasa	PLSF	77	54	62	71	77	57	71	59	62	94	82	55	47	10	878	0.09%
Hudson Samarasinghe	Ind 3	45	24	36	35	39	27	25	19	30	29	50	36	22	3	420	0.04%
Ariyawansha; Dissanayaka	DUNF	52	27	21	48	26	21	19	19	30	33	31	20	27	12	386	0.04%
A. W. Premawardhana	PFF	14	18	30	29	23	26	21	16	27	20	21	15	17	3	280	0.03%
Valid Votes		77,828	66,442	65,147	66,907	83,682	77,852	76,235	57,190	79,574	75,491	72,025	58,822	66,512	17,912	941,619	100.00%
Rejected Votes		1,933	1,443	941	1,081	1,780	1,759	1,545	1,582	1,809	1,514	1,619	1,181	1,541	1,040	20,768	
Total Polled		79,761	67,885	66,088	67,988	85,462	79,611	77,780	58,772	81,383	77,005	73,644	60,003	68,053	18,952	962,387	
Registered Electors		101,470	88,034	83,077	87,240	111,814	104,076	100,352	77,425	107,701	98,927	96,907	83,508	88,377		1,228,908	
Turnout		78.61%	77.11%	79.55%	77.93%	76.43%	76.49%	77.51%	75.91%	75.56%	77.84%	75.99%	71.85%	77.00%		78.31%	

=== 2005 presidential election ===
Results of the 5th presidential election held on 17 November 2005 for the district:

Candidate	Party	Votes per Polling Division													Postal Votes	Total Votes	%
Candidate	Party	Attanagalla	Biyagma	Divulapitiya	Dompe	Gampaha	Ja Ela	Katana	Kelaniya	Mahara	Minuwangoda	Mirigama	Negombo	Wattala	Postal Votes	Total Votes	%
Mahinda Rajapaksa	UPFA	52,393	43,249	39,347	45,849	62,018	46,950	49,095	33,179	56,759	49,509	45,537	24,236	31,446	17,131	596,698	54.78%
Ranil Wickramasinghe	UNP	33,171	34,685	34,945	30,306	34,376	42,606	40,473	28,676	37,772	37,801	36,345	40,805	40,984	8,819	481,764	44.23%
Siritunga Jayasuriya	USP	252	155	217	227	197	196	258	130	211	259	227	252	200	9	2,790	0.26%
A. A. Suraweera	NDF	214	183	179	238	191	167	195	142	198	179	196	141	141	7	2,371	0.22%
Victor; Hettigoda	ULPP	208	118	115	129	168	175	177	101	155	162	145	92	151	87	1,983	0.18%
Chamil; Jayaneththi	NLF	83	47	79	61	70	54	79	37	55	74	85	75	47	10	856	0.08%
Aruna de Soyza	RPP	63	42	46	51	55	51	84	23	60	42	38	37	37	2	631	0.06%
Anura; De Silva	ULF	40	28	51	52	46	56	52	26	42	59	70	46	39	2	609	0.06%
Wimal; Geeganage	SLNF	48	41	48	56	42	45	43	20	50	38	62	34	37	6	570	0.05%
A. K. J. Arachchige	DUA	37	23	36	39	31	19	31	23	35	36	42	42	22	2	418	0.04%
Wije; Dias	SEP	35	21	15	28	29	29	18	20	29	29	28	25	31	6	343	0.03%
P. Nelson; Perera	SLPF	16	7	15	11	9	11	13	5	10	22	13	16	8	1	157	0.01%
H. S. Dharmadwaja	UNAF	8	2	7	8	9	3	10	5	4	10	13	1	5	2	87	0.01%
Valid Votes		86,568	78,601	75,100	77,055	97,241	90,362	90,528	62,387	95,380	88,220	82,801	65,802	73,148	26,084	1,089,277	100.00%
Rejected Votes		1,090	754	680	669	944	973	977	708	901	947	982	799	873	427	11,724	
Total Polled		87,658	79,355	75,780	77,724	98,185	91,335	91,505	63,095	96,281	89,167	83,783	66,601	74,021	26,511	1,101,001	
Registered Electors		112,898	99,193	93,677	97,143	124,714	117,040	114,595	80,301	122,039	111,211	107,553	89,361	94,455		1,364,180	
Turnout		77.64%	80.00%	80.89%	80.01%	78.73%	78.04%	79.85%	78.57%	78.89%	80.18%	77.90%	74.53%	78.37%		80.71%	

=== 2010 presidential election ===
Results of the 6th presidential election held on 26 January 2010 for the district:

Candidate	Party	Votes per Polling Division													Postal Votes	Total Votes	%
Candidate	Party	Attanagalla	Biyagma	Divulapitiya	Dompe	Gampaha	Ja Ela	Katana	Kelaniya	Mahara	Minuwangoda	Mirigama	Negombo	Wattala	Postal Votes	Total Votes	%
Mahinda; Rajapaksa	UPFA	61,337	52,066	48,149	56,758	71,811	56,726	59,558	36,242	69,085	60,318	54,697	32,125	39,316	20,528	718,716	61.66%
Sarath; Fonseka	NDF	30,110	31,762	28,518	23,619	32,262	39,701	38,605	26,740	34,807	33,057	30,169	36,669	38,789	9,698	434,506	37.28%
M. C. M. Ismail	DUNF	136	102	197	124	122	149	150	124	136	235	160	187	215	22	2,059	0.18%
A. A. Suraweera	NDF	202	118	145	208	129	140	117	84	216	184	168	122	140	6	1,979	0.17%
W. V. M. Ranjith	Ind 1	121	91	108	137	114	73	142	67	123	111	131	69	82	10	1,379	0.12%
C. J. Sugathsiri; Gamage	UDF	91	68	90	81	78	73	105	85	98	101	101	138	110	11	1,230	0.11%
A. S. P. Liyanage	SLLP	77	100	61	59	65	77	72	90	76	54	89	67	97	8	992	0.09%
Ukkubanda Wijekoon	Ind 3	57	54	55	74	55	45	82	24	49	49	74	35	50	7	710	0.06%
Aithurus; M. Illias	Ind 2	60	28	44	38	43	31	34	31	42	39	65	34	35	2	526	0.05%
Lal; Perera	ONF	47	40	38	31	35	35	48	27	36	43	43	50	48	3	524	0.04%
Vikramabahu Karunaratne	LF	46	25	24	25	40	32	54	18	40	49	30	48	60	19	510	0.04%
Sarath Manamendra	NSH	49	35	43	37	40	34	46	28	28	38	38	32	50	2	500	0.04%
Siritunga Jayasuriya	USP	41	34	41	29	35	40	40	28	36	45	58	27	37	8	499	0.04%
M. K. Shivajilingam	Ind 5	26	20	15	17	11	15	37	13	17	19	22	48	42	1	303	0.03%
Wije; Dias	SEP	26	8	14	20	15	23	25	16	24	18	10	14	22	3	238	0.02%
M. Mohamed Musthaffa	Ind 4	19	14	12	13	18	17	12	10	15	14	7	14	8	0	173	0.01%
Ven.Battaramulla; Seelarathana Thero	JSP	15	10	16	12	6	10	14	7	23	14	16	7	11	7	168	0.01%
Sanath Pinnaduwa	NA	11	7	9	12	8	11	16	9	11	13	16	11	12	0	146	0.01%
Sarath Kongahage	UNAF	10	8	17	6	6	24	10	7	6	9	10	7	12	3	135	0.01%
Aruna de Soyza	RPP	14	7	11	10	21	10	8	8	8	6	11	7	5	4	130	0.01%
Senaratna de Silva	PNF	9	10	9	6	9	7	13	7	12	10	10	10	10	1	123	0.01%
M. B. Thaminimulla	ACAKO	11	4	8	8	4	6	9	6	17	9	8	2	9	1	102	0.01%
Valid Votes		92,515	84,611	77,624	81,324	104,927	97,279	99,197	63,671	104,905	94,435	85,933	69,723	79,160	30,344	1,165,648	100.00%
Rejected Votes		645	629	476	484	682	692	767	584	629	618	719	650	830	555	8,960	
Total Polled		93,160	85,240	78,100	81,808	105,609	97,971	99,964	64,255	105,534	95,053	86,652	70,373	79,990	30,899	1,174,608	
Registered Electors		120,900	107,786	99,742	104,155	133,606	127,821	127,421	83,105	134,581	120,860	114,566	96,028	103,893		1,474,464	
Turnout		77.06%	79.08%	78.30%	78.54%	79.05%	76.65%	78.45%	77.32%	78.42%	78.65%	75.64%	73.28%	76.99%		79.66%	

=== 2015 presidential election ===
Results of the 7th presidential election held on 8 January 2015:

Candidate	Party	Votes per Polling Division													Postal Votes	Total Votes	%
Candidate	Party	Attanagalla	Biyagma	Divulapitiya	Dompe	Gampaha	Ja Ela	Katana	Kelaniya	Mahara	Minuwangoda	Mirigama	Negombo	Wattala	Postal Votes	Total Votes	%
Maithripala; Sirisena	NDF	50,308	48,667	40,112	38,491	53,922	58,669	58,507	37,884	55,334	51,581	45,202	53,331	56,541	20,386	669,007	49.83%
Mahinda; Rajapaksa	UPFA	54,777	50,173	45,813	54,714	63,962	53,481	54,355	32,856	63,314	54,929	51,244	25,432	38,001	20,296	664,347	49.49%
R. A. Sirisena	PNF	86	89	95	109	102	89	119	79	94	125	104	64	82	12	1,249	0.09%
Namal; Rajapaksa	ONF	100	62	75	104	61	73	77	63	112	73	81	62	69	21	1,033	0.08%
Aithurus; M. Illias	Ind 1	98	49	83	72	70	70	84	35	68	88	82	65	59	7	930	0.07%
A. S. P. Liyanage	SLLP	57	56	67	38	57	62	84	46	51	61	69	110	108	6	872	0.06%
M. I. Mohamed; Mishlar	UPF	91	56	64	62	54	53	64	69	61	66	53	83	84	5	859	0.06%
Duminda; Nagamuwa	FSP	50	75	57	52	85	52	47	34	87	55	51	50	60	25	780	0.06%
R. Peduru; Arachchi	ULPP	48	46	45	51	40	49	57	45	63	53	48	62	57	4	668	0.05%
Siritunga; Jayasuriya	USP	44	27	30	26	44	41	48	35	33	54	55	48	65	16	566	0.04%
Ven.Battaramulla; Seelarathana Thero	JSP	40	34	23	32	42	28	35	30	25	30	27	16	26	21	409	0.03%
Sarath Manamendra	NSH	35	22	26	36	28	27	35	19	32	39	28	42	25	5	399	0.03%
Vajirapani; Wijesiriwardene	SEP	26	13	19	19	23	24	22	19	30	25	18	17	21	5	281	0.02%
Anurudha; Polgampola	Ind 2	17	18	11	14	21	24	30	8	20	21	14	22	32	5	257	0.02%
M. B. Theminimulla	ACAKO	19	13	20	11	13	14	19	14	17	21	17	19	17	2	216	0.02%
Prasanna; Priyankara	DNM	16	4	14	16	13	10	19	9	12	11	20	22	20	6	192	0.01%
Sundaram; Mahendran	NSSP	22	8	11	11	7	4	12	6	8	21	17	17	23	2	169	0.01%
Wimal; Geeganage	SLNF	9	8	8	6	14	16	7	10	11	10	11	13	14	3	140	0.01%
Jayantha; Kulathunga	ULGC	16	13	10	7	6	11	14	5	9	7	6	7	7	4	122	0.01%
Valid Votes		105,931	99,433	86,583	93,871	118,564	112,797	113,635	71,260	120,381	107,270	97,147	79,482	95,311	40,831	1,342,496	100.00%
Rejected Votes		1,024	997	701	878	1,222	1,584	1,505	859	1,154	986	880	871	1,332	654	14,647	1.08%
Total Polled		106,955	100,430	87,284	94,749	119,786	114,381	115,140	72,119	121,535	108,256	98,027	80,353	96,643	41,485	1,357,143	82.08%
Registered Electors		133,023	121,702	108,529	115,536	147,280	143,843	143,885	90,122	149,453	132,981	124,679	106,213	120,471	42,726	1,637,537	

=== 2019 presidential election ===
Results of the 8th presidential election held on 16 November 2019:

Candidate	Party	Votes per Polling Division													Postal Votes	Total Votes	%
Candidate	Party	Attanagalla	Biyagma	Divulapitiya	Dompe	Gampaha	Ja Ela	Katana	Kelaniya	Mahara	Minuwangoda	Mirigama	Negombo	Wattala	Postal Votes	Total Votes	%
Gotabaya; Rajapaksa	SLPP	66,850	68,145	55,371	67,754	84,507	71,690	71,565	43,668	83,989	69,978	61,478	31,743	48,214	30,918	855,870	59.28%
Sajith; Premadasa	NDF	39,548	33,715	32,149	28,629	31,984	41,649	43,053	27,521	38,407	37,212	35,184	44,032	49,463	12,125	494,671	34.26%
Anura Kumara; Dissanayake	NMPP	4,829	4,188	3,117	3,070	6,256	5,556	5,343	3,134	5,547	5,259	4,720	4,132	3,428	3,181	61,760	4.28%
Mahesh; Senanayake	NPP	503	646	399	341	932	1,527	1,375	589	804	646	365	1,546	899	700	11,272	0.78%
Rohan; Pallewatte	JSWP	252	215	179	229	627	313	351	138	235	269	178	199	258	143	3,586	0.25%
Ajantha; Perera	SPSL	231	211	221	272	247	201	247	122	269	251	228	138	127	21	2,786	0.19%
M. L. A. M. Hizbullah	Ind 11	177	126	121	136	145	135	173	90	157	129	139	128	129	17	1,802	0.12%
Ariyawansa; Dissanayake	DUNF	120	71	121	90	99	121	133	76	98	127	139	159	191	8	1,553	0.11%
Siripala; Amarasinghe	Ind 02	85	58	78	68	53	60	79	47	87	86	96	91	70	13	971	0.07%
Ven.Battaramulla; Seelarathana Thero	JSP	76	58	56	54	61	56	79	47	82	76	77	69	111	26	928	0.06%
Ajantha de zoysa	RJP	69	52	70	79	56	65	93	46	68	86	74	76	57	17	908	0.06%
Namal; Rajapaksa	NUA	71	54	54	70	60	78	92	41	82	53	70	52	61	9	847	0.06%
Duminda; Nagamuwa	FSP	51	73	57	45	108	54	59	30	110	50	51	55	56	41	840	0.06%
Milroy; Fernando	Ind 09	63	52	64	41	47	73	73	43	63	55	52	111	95	8	840	0.06%
Ven.Aparekke; Punnananda Thero	Ind 01	54	30	30	35	34	53	52	37	35	43	48	50	64	19	584	0.04%
Jayantha; Ketagoda	Ind 07	46	40	27	35	28	48	52	26	44	34	33	58	44	4	519	0.04%
Anuruddha; Polgampola	Ind 08	39	20	25	32	29	30	35	25	26	24	26	46	51	4	412	0.03%
Subramanium; Gunaratnam	ONF	33	21	32	28	15	25	46	16	24	30	40	24	36	0	370	0.03%
A. S. P. Liyanage	SLLP	21	23	19	17	17	34	32	15	23	18	20	40	41	3	323	0.02%
Aithurus; M. Illias	Ind 03	22	11	28	20	20	14	25	19	18	25	38	28	22	2	292	0.02%
Aruna de soyza	DNM	13	14	16	17	21	24	21	11	26	34	26	29	27	2	281	0.02%
Piyasiri; Wijenayake	Ind 13	23	10	26	23	22	20	27	13	20	24	21	22	12	4	267	0.02%
Sirithunga; Jayasuriya	USP	16	13	17	14	12	17	21	9	14	17	27	24	28	2	231	0.02%
Vajirapani; Wijesiriwardene	SEP	15	11	13	19	28	26	12	7	21	12	11	18	24	6	223	0.02%
M. K. Shivajilingam	Ind 10	14	14	7	9	9	10	20	12	13	11	13	35	41	3	211	0.01%
A. H. M. Alavi	Ind 04	18	5	17	20	14	15	17	10	16	18	22	24	12	1	209	0.01%
Rajiva; Wijesinha	Ind 14	15	14	13	19	11	18	18	8	14	18	21	17	19	2	207	0.01%
Sarath; Manamendra	NSU	14	10	12	20	15	20	15	9	7	16	25	16	9	2	190	0.01%
Ashoka; Wadigamangawa	Ind 12	17	11	13	14	31	10	19	8	9	10	12	17	7	4	182	0.01%
Sarath; Keerthirathna	Ind 05	18	10	4	20	19	14	9	7	8	14	10	15	12	3	163	0.01%
Priyantha; Edirisinghe	ACAKO	12	2	15	7	15	9	14	9	10	9	11	11	17	2	143	0.01%
Samaraweera; Weeravanni	Ind 15	5	3	6	9	7	8	8	4	8	8	5	16	14	3	104	0.01%
Saman; Perera	OPPP	8	6	7	6	6	13	12	7	6	9	7	8	8	0	103	0.01%
B. G. Nandimithra	NSSP	15	4	4	5	8	3	6	7	6	8	5	6	9	1	87	0.01%
Samansiri; Herath	Ind 06	5	2	4	4	4	8	4	4	4	7	7	4	6	2	65	0.00%
Valid Votes		113,348	107,938	92,392	101,251	125,547	121,997	123,180	75,855	130,350	114,666	103,279	83,039	103,662	47,296	1,443,800	100.00%
Rejected Votes		960	902	780	684	1,191	1,625	1,786	899	1,166	1,123	981	1,430	1,418	806	15,751	0.9%
Total Polled		114,308	108,840	93,172	101,935	126,738	123,622	124,966	76,754	131,516	115,789	104,260	84,469	105,080	48,102	1,459,551	83.31%
Registered Electors		135,618	128,417	110,231	117,950	151,418	153,164	153,448	93,979	156,924	137,067	124,599	110,551	129,912	48,614	1,751,892	

=== 2024 presidential election ===
Results of the 9th presidential election held on 21 September 2024:

Candidate	Party	Votes per Polling Division													Postal Votes	Votes	%
Candidate	Party	Attanagalla	Biyagma	Divulapitiya	Dompe	Gampaha	Ja Ela	Katana	Kelaniya	Mahara	Minuwangoda	Mirigama	Negombo	Wattala	Postal Votes	Votes	%
Anura Kumara; Dissanayake	NPP	63,916	61,452	46,362	55,130	78,778	71,359	69,944	37,049	76,417	66,829	56,245	45,206	47,505	33,226	809,410	55.5%
Sajith; Premadasa	SJB	28,714	20,439	28,540	24,009	22,130	27,567	33,262	17,042	26,979	28,968	28,642	24,484	32,391	6,383	349,550	23.97%
Ranil; Wickremesinghe	Ind16	16,223	20,314	11,013	16,750	18,138	16,907	15,984	12,452	20,818	16,480	14,455	9,284	18,094	9,116	216,028	14.81%
Namal; Rajapaksa	SLPP	2,840	3,212	5,485	3,595	3,709	2,917	4,030	2,347	3,548	2,761	2,975	1,112	1,719	943	41,193	2.82%
Dilith; Jayaweera	SLCP	1,188	1,906	978	1,335	1,909	1,550	1,144	1,160	1,886	1,150	951	429	1,116	441	17,143	1.18%
D. M. Bandaranayake	Ind13	247	226	199	212	267	219	253	106	226	234	215	214	212	23	2,853	0.2%
Sarath; Fonseka	Ind12	137	112	121	127	171	161	147	173	183	172	140	92	140	64	1,940	0.13%
Suranjeewa; Anoj de Silva	DUNF	167	184	140	142	182	122	146	74	203	161	168	50	61	57	1,857	0.13%
K. K. Piyadasa	Ind04	144	86	129	134	84	95	171	74	122	138	135	195	145	17	1,669	0.11%
Namal; Rajapaksa	SBP	116	92	125	113	141	97	126	78	118	86	124	49	73	59	1,397	0.1%
Wijeyadasa; Rajapakshe	JPF	133	93	110	86	117	100	107	72	128	130	133	56	86	40	1,391	0.1%
Sarath; Keerthirathne	Ind05	115	90	91	105	92	73	138	57	82	107	116	90	71	5	1,232	0.08%
Nuwan; Bopege	SPF	86	94	55	56	115	78	72	58	123	86	75	82	102	63	1,145	0.08%
Anuruddha; Polgampola	Ind11	73	63	78	85	93	77	124	41	81	91	94	112	108	8	1,128	0.08%
Ajantha de Zoyza	RJA	77	73	69	80	93	89	90	47	102	98	77	92	74	12	1,073	0.07%
Ven.Battaramulle; Seelarathana Thero	JSP	79	54	47	61	109	55	56	54	89	79	78	23	56	25	865	0.06%
Ven.Akmeemana; Dayarathana Thero	Ind01	67	49	62	71	67	42	67	36	74	67	69	50	65	21	807	0.06%
Pakkiyaselvam; Ariyanethiran	Ind09	21	24	19	21	19	44	66	33	11	18	19	192	235	9	731	0.05%
K. R. Krishan	APP	60	23	75	58	47	36	81	25	52	78	70	50	45	4	704	0.05%
Priyantha; Wickremesinghe	NSSP	71	57	40	61	51	51	47	44	55	64	55	35	60	8	699	0.05%
Siripala; Amarasinghe	Ind02	51	32	51	44	51	34	59	21	31	46	53	36	44	9	562	0.04%
Abubakar Mohamed; Infaz	DUA	44	28	39	39	32	21	38	22	36	41	28	35	45	1	449	0.03%
Mahinda; Dewage	SLSP	44	40	26	44	25	21	45	24	37	27	28	34	18	6	419	0.03%
Sirithunga; Jayasuriya	USP	30	31	32	30	34	29	44	19	27	35	35	30	29	4	409	0.03%
Keerthi; Wickremeratne	AJP	40	35	16	29	52	28	31	27	35	25	24	15	24	11	392	0.03%
Victor; Anthony Perera	Ind10	27	26	23	36	25	21	38	15	33	40	43	28	34	2	391	0.02%
Roshan; Ranasinghe	Ind15	26	23	18	24	29	30	27	22	38	33	24	37	23	6	360	0.02%
Vajirapani; Wijesiriwardene	SEP	27	30	15	15	42	30	18	18	33	18	18	24	32	5	325	0.02%
Oshala; Herath	NIF	24	17	14	27	29	20	27	15	20	25	18	25	27	5	293	0.02%
Lalith; De Silva	UNFP	22	15	22	11	31	26	20	8	32	24	26	23	17	3	280	0.02%
Ananda; Kularatne	Ind06	32	22	15	28	15	18	30	2	19	24	32	15	18	0	270	0.02%
Premasiri; Manage	Ind14	28	17	32	22	13	10	48	11	16	14	25	14	20	0	270	0.02%
P. W. S. K. Bandaranayake	NDF	32	18	24	27	29	7	24	7	17	19	17	21	17	3	262	0.02%
Sidney; Jayarathna	Ind07	23	19	23	24	23	15	31	11	19	13	16	22	15	0	254	0.02%
Janaka; Ratnayake	ULPP	25	16	12	12	25	21	20	6	15	21	14	13	7	4	211	0.01%
Mylvanagam; Thilakarajah	Ind08	6	14	10	9	4	9	12	7	8	3	35	11	23	3	154	0.01%
A. S. P. Liyanage	SLLP	11	10	9	10	6	11	15	6	13	10	6	13	16	1	137	0.01%
Sarath; Manamendra	NSU	8	9	8	7	13	8	17	6	15	13	10	13	7	2	136	0.01%
Valid Votes		114,974	109,045	94,127	102,669	126,790	121,990	126,599	71,269	131,741	118,228	105,288	82,306	102,774	50,589	1,458,389	100.00%
Rejected Votes		2,159	1,947	1,763	2,226	2,286	2,384	2,412	1,707	2,571	2,222	2,072	1,690	2,526	1,416	29,381	1.97%
Total Polled		117,133	110,992	95,890	104,895	129,076	124,374	129,011	72,976	134,312	120,450	107,360	83,996	105,300	52,005	1,487,770	79.09%
Registered Electors		145,602	138,720	118,718	127,767	163,087	163,461	167,689	97,376	169,884	149,482	132,932	115,968	138,957	52,486	1,881,129	

Preferential votes

12,217	16,683
Anura Kumara Dissanayake	Sajith Premadasa

== Parliamentary Elections ==
=== 1989 parliamentary general election ===
Results of the 9th parliamentary election held on 15 February 1989 for the district:

Party	Votes per Polling Division													Postal Votes	Total Votes	%	Seats
Party	Attanagalla	Biyagma	Divulapitiya	Dompe	Gampaha	Ja Ela	Katana	Kelaniya	Mahara	Minuwangoda	Mirigama	Negombo	Wattala	Postal Votes	Total Votes	%	Seats
United National Party	25,194	25,435	27,430	27,777	30,376	34,415	28,660	23,549	28,310	32,021	33,179	30,610	28,841	9,936	385,733	54.14%	10
Sri Lanka Freedom Party	28,576	18,521	23,286	25,746	27,765	19,230	22,318	18,716	25,361	25,061	22,985	12,566	17,229	7,130	294,490	41.34%	7
United Socialist Alliance (Note: Including the CPSL, LSSP, NSSP, SLMP.)	1,166	1,435	850	857	1,426	1,901	2,656	3,064	2,112	1,015	557	1,810	2,029	787	21,665	3.04%	0
United Lanka People's Party	1,765	1,253	233	345	859	390	333	438	513	756	1,618	1,310	512	224	10,549	1.48%	0
Valid Votes	56,701	46,644	51,799	54,725	60,426	55,936	53,967	45,767	56,296	58,853	58,339	46,296	48,611	18,077	712,437	100.00%	17
Rejected Votes	2,677	2,507	2,536	2,401	2,297	2,640	2,457	2,190	2,631	2,436	2,713	2,403	2,200	409	32,497		
Total Polled	59,378	49,151	54,335	57,126	62,723	58,576	56,424	47,957	58,927	61,289	61,052	48,699	50,811	18,486	744,934		
Registered Electors	77,198	65,038	67,159	71,255	82,689	80,113	75,135	65,066	78,192	76,279	77,242	67,618	67,601	19,073	969,658		
Turnout	76.92%	75.57%	80.91%	80.17%	75.85%	73.12%	75.10%	73.71%	75.36%	80.35%	79.04%	72.02%	75.16%	96.92%	76.82%		

Preferential votes
Alliance	Party	Candidate	votes
SLFP	SLFP	Sirimavo Bandaranaike	214,390
SLFP	SLFP	Anura Bandaranaike	107,177
UNP	UNP	Joseph Michael Perera	104,094
UNP	UNP	John Amaratunga	90,797
UNP	UNP	Ranil Wickramasinghe	86,477
UNP	UNP	Sarath Chandra Rajakaruna	80,154
UNP	UNP	Paul Perera	63,602
SLFP	SLFP	Lakshman Jayakody	62,652
UNP	UNP	Wijayapala Mendis	59,235
UNP	UNP	Donald Dissanayake	56,610
UNP	UNP	Mahendra Wijeratne	52,738
SLFP	SLFP	Jeyaraj Fernandopulle	51,485
SLFP	SLFP	Anura Pradeep Hapangama	47,550
UNP	UNP	Mahen Gunasekera	44,630
UNP	UNP	Ariyarathna Jayathilaka	39,893
SLFP	SLFP	Reggie Ranatunga	37,163
SLFP	SLFP	Sardhatissa Sakalasooriya	36,363

=== 1994 parliamentary general election ===
Results of the 10th parliamentary election held on 16 August 1994 for the district:

Party	Votes per Polling Division													Postal Votes	Total Votes	%	Seats
Party	Attanagalla	Biyagma	Divulapitiya	Dompe	Gampaha	Ja Ela	Katana	Kelaniya	Mahara	Minuwangoda	Mirigama	Negombo	Wattala	Postal Votes	Total Votes	%	Seats
People's Alliance (Note: Including the SLFP.)	45,629	34,719	32,951	35,849	47,822	40,838	40,684	32,961	43,413	39,893	37,512	28,830	32,311	15,618	509,030	56.79%	11
United National Party	24,269	25,537	29,141	26,552	27,133	31,851	29,617	23,504	29,173	29,455	30,492	28,624	31,482	8,801	375,631	41.91%	7
Sri Lanka Progressive Front (Note: Including the JVP.)	849	1,048	523	589	1,340	970	633	1,314	1,149	844	1,100	289	593	386	11,627	1.30%	0
Valid Votes	70,747	61,304	62,615	62,990	76,295	73,659	70,934	57,779	73,735	70,192	69,104	57,743	64,386	24,805	896,288	100.00%	18
Rejected Votes	2,638	2,373	2,228	2,331	2,456	2,567	3,044	2,271	2,685	2,288	2,739	2,566	2,627	740	33,553		
Total Polled	73,385	63,677	64,843	65,321	78,751	76,226	73,978	60,050	76,420	72,480	71,843	60,309	67,013	25,545	929,841		
Registered Electors	91,907	80,600	77,104	80,415	100,416	97,305	92,027	78,191	98,091	89,192	89,455	80,589	85,516		1,140,808		
Turnout	79.85%	79.00%	84.10%	81.23%	78.42%	78.34%	80.39%	76.80%	77.91%	81.26%	80.31%	74.84%	78.36%		81.51%		

Preferential votes
Alliance	Party	Candidate	votes
PA	SLFP	Chandrika Kumaratunga	464,588
UNP	UNP	John Amaratunga	122,813
PA	SLFP	Jeyaraj Fernandopulle	102,129
UNP	UNP	Wijayapala Mendis	96,559
UNP	UNP	Joseph Michael Perera	93,884
PA	SLFP	Lakshman Jayakody	88,628
PA	SLFP	Felix Perera	80,539
UNP	UNP	Aloysius Reginold Perera	73,508
PA	SLFP	Athula Nimalasiri Jayasinghe	65,623
UNP	UNP	Suranimala Rajapaksha	63,067
UNP	UNP	Anura Pradeep Hapangama	62,829
PA	SLFP	Reggie Ranatunga	61,458
UNP	UNP	Sarath Chandra Rajakaruna	59,992
PA	SLFP	Jinadasa Nandasena	58,237
PA	SLFP	Lionel Gunawardena	57,091
PA	SLFP	Neil Rupasinghe	57,090
PA	SLFP	Upali Gunaratne	55,328
PA	SLFP	A. V. Suraweera	50,740

=== 2000 parliamentary general election ===
Results of the 11th parliamentary election held on 10 October 2000 for the district:

Party	Votes per Polling Division													Postal Votes	Total Votes	%	Seats
Party	Attanagalla	Biyagma	Divulapitiya	Dompe	Gampaha	Ja Ela	Katana	Kelaniya	Mahara	Minuwangoda	Mirigama	Negombo	Wattala	Postal Votes	Total Votes	%	Seats
People's Alliance (Note: Including the SLFP.)	42,537	30,828	32,294	35,897	45,394	38,150	42,316	24,734	40,884	38,350	33,116	24,826	29,015	11,677	470,018	48.87%	10
United National Party	23,248	27,052	28,894	25,053	27,794	33,089	30,157	24,045	30,031	30,025	30,025	28,983	32,570	7,362	378,328	39.34%	7
Janatha Vimukthi Peramuna	6,229	5,796	3,289	4,576	8,284	6,198	3,906	5,651	7,489	6,148	6,732	2,557	4,146	2,109	73,110	7.60%	1
Sinhala Heritage	1,315	1,539	658	972	2,434	2,180	1,578	2,292	1,983	1,530	813	975	1,320	708	20,297	2.11%	0
National Unity Alliance (Note: Including the SLMC.)	3,475	2,039	17	205	40	47	223	405	339	411	982	2,596	191	43	11,013	1.15%	0
New Left Front (Note: Including the NSSP.)	286	202	254	310	291	261	314	178	270	272	310	285	226	43	3,502	0.36%	0
Sinhalaye Mahasammatha Bhoomiputra Pakshaya	123	184	52	53	158	68	50	170	112	231	94	36	67	65	1,463	0.15%	0
United Lalith Front	86	68	98	105	68	72	80	62	107	96	102	67	78	4	1,093	0.11%	0
Citizen's; Front	81	49	34	44	105	47	48	58	78	55	69	30	57	19	774	0.08%	0
Democratic United National Front	52	25	25	37	54	29	37	21	50	48	35	28	27	5	473	0.05%	0
Independent Group 01	29	19	11	16	20	23	27	20	16	24	24	17	22	2	270	0.03%	0
Independent Group 03	30	16	27	24	25	12	31	11	20	24	13	13	19	0	265	0.03%	0
Independent Group 05	16	15	29	20	11	12	17	11	24	23	29	12	12	2	233	0.02%	0
Liberal; Party	15	12	21	10	17	10	27	15	29	14	19	22	13	8	232	0.02%	0
Independent Group 04	19	17	12	11	17	7	14	15	17	13	17	8	9	1	177	0.02%	0
Sri Lanka Progressive Front	34	12	9	6	13	6	12	9	9	8	8	12	7	4	149	0.02%	0
Independent Group 02	11	16	11	6	21	9	7	9	13	11	6	9	8	0	137	0.01%	0
People's Freedom Front	10	8	3	17	10	13	5	5	9	9	7	1	1	1	99	0.01%	0
Ruhunu People's Party	4	3	1	3	11	6	7	5	5	5	4	5	15	2	76	0.01%	0
Valid Votes	77,600	67,900	65,739	67,365	84,767	80,239	78,856	57,716	81,485	77,297	72,405	60,482	67,803	22,055	961,709	100.00%	18
Rejected Votes	3,507	2,431	2,439	2,540	2,903	2,823	3,350	2,251	3,075	2,926	3,214	2,858	2,564	509	37,390		
Total Polled	81,107	70,331	68,178	69,905	87,670	83,062	82,206	59,967	84,560	80,223	75,619	63,340	70,367	22,564	990,099		
Registered Electors	103,895	90,501	84,780	89,364	114,218	106,334	103,105	77,681	110,100	101,131	98,681	84,290	89,336		1,253,416		
Turnout (%)	78.07%	77.71%	80.42%	78.23%	76.76%	78.11%	79.73%	77.20%	76.80%	79.33%	76.63%	75.15%	78.77%		79.71%		

Preferential votes
Alliance	Party	Candidate	votes
UNP	UNP	Karu Jayasuriya	237,387
PA	SLFP	Susil Premajayantha	165,905
PA	SLFP	Jeyaraj Fernandopulle	138,859
UNP	UNP	Anura Bandaranaike	99,536
PA	SLFP	Felix Perera	96,222
PA	SLFP	Pandu Bandaranaike	92,182
UNP	UNP	Jayalath Jayawardena	82,730
PA	SLFP	Reggie Ranatunga	79,510
PA	SLFP	Sarath Keerthiratne	77,427
UNP	UNP	John Amaratunga	67,104
UNP	UNP	Edward Gunaserkara	65,157
PA	SLFP	Lionel Gunawardena	59,777
UNP	UNP	Joseph Michael Perera	59,646
PA	SLFP	Sarathchandra Peramuna	52,416
PA	SLFP	Neil Rupasinghe	51,500
UNP	UNP	Suranimala Rajapaksha	49,697
PA	SLFP	Ananda Moonasinghe	48,863
JVP	JVP	Vijitha Herath	8,823

=== 2001 parliamentary general election ===
Results of the 12th parliamentary election held on 5 December 2001 for the district:

Party	Votes per Polling Division													Postal Votes	Total Votes	%	Seats
Party	Attanagalla	Biyagma	Divulapitiya	Dompe	Gampaha	Ja Ela	Katana	Kelaniya	Mahara	Minuwangoda	Mirigama	Negombo	Wattala	Postal Votes	Total Votes	%	Seats
United National Front (Note: Including the UNP, SLMC, CWC, WPF.)	29,618	32,882	31,434	28,707	32,479	38,219	35,075	27,174	34,904	32,726	33,405	35,678	37,592	7,396	437,289	43.94%	9
People's Alliance (Note: Including the SLFP.)	39,531	28,778	29,656	33,199	41,519	34,522	39,498	23,419	37,499	34,348	31,014	21,811	24,651	9,335	428,780	43.08%	7
Janatha Vimukthi Peramuna	9,351	8,665	5,817	7,558	12,791	9,856	7,388	7,589	11,262	9,627	10,143	4,141	6,641	3,161	113,990	11.45%	2
Sinhala Heritage	694	549	303	337	1,090	708	548	932	831	633	462	265	513	240	8,105	0.81%	0
New Left; Front (Note: Including the NSSP.)	330	220	196	291	315	282	296	175	303	267	284	262	220	47	3,488	0.35%	0
United Socialist Party	47	78	40	45	41	58	60	41	66	61	73	56	62	8	736	0.07%	0
United Lalith Front	46	47	33	62	41	56	53	35	41	65	62	40	39	3	623	0.06%	0
Sinhalaye Mahasammatha Bhoomiputra Pakshaya	37	28	12	22	39	21	16	40	39	44	38	15	17	21	389	0.04%	0
Ruhunu People's Party	42	36	19	18	23	26	25	18	35	24	33	18	15	2	334	0.03%	0
Independent Group 6	24	23	25	32	20	30	30	12	40	24	25	18	14	0	317	0.03%	0
United Sinhala Great Council	22	7	14	17	18	13	16	34	21	11	7	7	34	5	226	0.02%	0
Independent Group 5	15	14	11	19	18	14	18	11	17	14	24	12	7	0	194	0.02%	0
Sri Lanka Muslim Party	9	5	4	9	10	16	20	15	14	11	21	10	10	1	146	0.01%	0
Independent Group 3	24	11	8	16	8	9	12	8	7	6	15	6	5	1	136	0.01%	0
Independent Group 4	10	8	4	10	10	9	14	4	6	11	9	11	4	3	113	0.01%	0
Independent Group 2	8	9	4	10	11	10	6	9	12	3	11	7	5	2	107	0.01%	0
Independent Group 1	4	7	6	7	7	8	1	3	14	8	10	6	8	2	100	0.01%	0
Sri Lanka Progressive Front	2	7	1	11	8	10	7	7	6	11	4	7	8	1	90	0.01%	0
Sri Lanka National Front	2	7	6	5	4	3	6	5	6	10	6	3	4	0	67	0.01%	0
Valid Votes	79,816	71,381	67,593	70,375	88,452	83,870	83,089	59,531	85,123	77,904	75,646	62,373	69,849	20,228	995,230	100.00%	18
Rejected Votes	3,490	2,617	2,672	2,569	2,909	2,524	3,143	2,532	3,158	2,906	3,330	3,044	2,791	487	38,172		
Total Polled	83,306	73,998	70,265	72,944	91,361	86,394	86,232	62,063	88,281	80,810	78,976	65,417	72,640	20,715	1,033,402		
Registered Electors	106,025	93,735	87,050	91,487	116,768	109,799	106,508	79,217	113,172	103,461	100,833	85,784	92,154		1,285,993		
Turnout	78.57%	78.94%	80.72%	79.73%	78.24%	78.68%	80.96%	78.35%	78.01%	78.11%	78.32%	76.26%	78.82%		80.36%		

Preferential votes
Alliance	Party	Candidate	votes
PA	SLFP	Anura Bandaranaike	265,160
UNF	UNP	Karu Jayasuriya	250,912
UNF	UNP	Jayalath Jayawardena	116,737
PA	SLFP	Jeyaraj Fernandopulle	95,591
UNF	UNP	Joseph Michael Perera	86,959
UNF	UNP	John Amaratunga	82,326
UNF	UNP	Olitha Premathiratne	81,302
PA	SLFP	Pandu Bandaranaike	78,614
PA	SLFP	Felix Perera	73,029
UNF	UNP	Edward Gunaserkara	70,667
UNF	UNP	Suranimala Rajapaksha	60,861
UNF	UNP	Sarath Chandra Rajakaruna	60,776
PA	SLFP	Sarana Gunawardena	59,470
UNF	UNP	Ravindra Randeniya	56,449
PA	SLFP	Reggie Ranatunga	53,031
PA	SLFP	Neil Rupasinghe	48,167
JVP	JVP	Vijitha Herath	13,981
JVP	JVP	Anjan Umma	10,834

=== 2004 parliamentary general election ===
Results of the 13th parliamentary election held on 2 April 2004 for the district:

Party	Votes per Polling Division													Postal Votes	Total Votes	%	Seats
Party	Attanagalla	Biyagma	Divulapitiya	Dompe	Gampaha	Ja Ela	Katana	Kelaniya	Mahara	Minuwangoda	Mirigama	Negombo	Wattala	Postal Votes	Total Votes	%	Seats
United People's Freedom Alliance (Note: Including the SLFP, JVP.)	45,529	34,502	34,257	40,327	51,944	42,453	41,823	25,774	47,558	41,026	39,853	24,357	28,344	12,216	509,963	51.51%	9
United National Front (Note: Including the UNP, SLMC, CWC, WPF.)	24,282	24,696	26,267	23,111	24,652	34,248	31,919	21,450	27,012	28,632	27,523	33,709	34,041	6,030	367,572	37.13%	6
Jathika Hela Urumaya	8,741	11,434	5,666	5,943	11,357	6,009	6,254	10,956	11,194	9,292	6,775	1,759	4,525	2,611	102,516	10.36%	2
National Development Front	189	306	278	164	327	671	637	251	377	339	193	387	478	25	4,622	0.47%	0
United Socialist Party	237	197	234	192	116	236	282	147	178	248	265	277	233	10	2,852	0.29%	0
New Left; Front (Note: Including the NSSP.)	54	57	40	26	53	97	98	51	76	63	46	148	102	21	932	0.09%	0
Independent Group 10	27	14	26	22	20	23	18	17	16	26	20	14	16	1	260	0.03%	0
Sinhalaye Mahasammatha Bhoomiputra Pakshaya	8	15	17	7	15	4	62	11	25	15	10	4	4	6	203	0.02%	0
Independent Group 09	13	9	15	13	7	6	10	11	12	9	20	8	16	0	149	0.02%	0
Independent Group 03	22	9	9	14	17	10	13	6	12	9	16	4	1	1	143	0.01%	0
Swarajya; Party	4	15	5	12	12	5	10	35	12	1	6	4	7	1	129	0.01%	0
Democratic United National Front	4	3	3	6	35	9	4	9	2	4	1	7	20	0	107	0.01%	0
Liberal Party of Sri Lanka	7	1	4	20	8	8	6	5	5	1	2		4	2	73	0.01%	0
Sri Lanka Muslim Party	4	4	3	4	2	4	10	6	7	4	3	7	15	0	73	0.01%	0
Independent Group 07	6	3	5	2	7	4	11	2	4	4	4	7	6	1	66	0.01%	0
Independent Group 01	3	4	3	5	3	4	7	4	5	9	1	11	5	1	65	0.01%	0
Independent Group 04	3	5	2	4	6	3	3	4	3	7	4		4	0	48	0.00%	0
Independent Group 08	4	3	4	2	4	9	1	4		3	3	4	2	0	43	0.00%	0
Ruhuna People's Party	3	2	3	3	5	6	2	2	4	2	3	3	4	0	42	0.00%	0
Sri Lanka Progressive Front	2	7	2	2	1	4	4	1	1	7	2	3	3	1	40	0.00%	0
Independent Group 06	2	2	1	1	1	1	2	2	5	2	4	4	6	1	34	0.00%	0
Sri Lanka National Front	7	1	0	1	2	1	5	2	3	2	1	3	0	0	28	0.00%	0
Independent Group 02	2	1	2	4	3	0	2	2	0	3	2	4	0	0	25	0.00%	0
Independent Group 05	2	2	1	0	0	1	2	1	3	1	2	1	1	0	17	0.00%	0
Valid Votes	79,155	71,292	66,847	69,885	88,597	83,816	81,185	58,753	86,514	79,709	74,759	60,725	67,837	20,928	990,002	100.00%	17
Rejected Votes	3,853	2,585	2,884	3,073	3,485	2,997	3,268	2,396	3,448	3,169	3,677	2,842	2,761	424	40,862		
Total Polled	83,008	73,877	69,731	72,958	92,082	86,813	84,453	61,149	89,962	82,878	78,436	63,567	70,598	21,352	1,030,864		
Registered Electors	109,731	96,568	90,352	94,755	120,833	113,559	110,706	80,329	117,826	107,679	104,122	88,773	91,912		1,327,145		
Turnout	75.65%	76.50%	77.18%	77.00%	76.21%	76.45%	76.29%	76.12%	76.35%	76.97%	75.33%	71.61%	76.81%		77.68%		

Preferential votes
Alliance	Party	Candidate	votes
UPFA	JVP	Vijitha Herath	215,540
UNF	UNP	Karu Jayasuriya	202,029
UPFA	SLFP	Anura Bandaranaike (Note: Anura Bandaranaike (UPFA-SLFP) died on 16 March 2008. His replacement Sarana Gunawardena (UPFA-SLFP) was sworn in on 6 May 2008.)	198,444
UPFA	JVP	Siripala Amarasingha (Note: Siripala Amarasingha (UPFA-JVP) resigned on 19 April 2006. His replacement was Sarath Kumara Gunaratna (UPFA-SLFP).)	128,633
UPFA	JVP	Anjan Umma	111,755
UNF	UNP	Joseph Michael Perera	95,231
UNF	UNP	Jayalath Jayawardena	93,643
UPFA	SLFP	Jeyaraj Fernandopulle (Note: Jeyaraj Fernandopulle (UPFA-SLFP) was murdered on 6 April 2008. His replacement Dulip Wijeysekara (UPFA-SLFP) was sworn in on 6 May 2008.)	90,307
UPFA	SLFP	Lasantha Alagiyawanna	86,550
UNF	UNP	John Amaratunga	86,141
UPFA	SLFP	Sripathi Sooriyaarachchi (Note: Sripathi Sooriyaarachchi (UPFA-SLFP(M)) was killed on 9 February 2008. His replacement was Reggie Ranatunga (UPFA-SLFP).) (Note: Reggie Ranatunga (UPFA-SLFP) died on 31 May 2008. His replacement Neil Rupasinghe (UPFA-SLFP) was sworn in on 6 June 2008.)	76,637
UPFA	SLFP	Felix Perera	72,616
UPFA	SLFP	Pandu Bandaranaike	56,715
UNF	UNP	Sarath Chandra Rajakaruna	55,337
UNF	UNP	Edward Gunaserkara	44,890
JHU	JHU	Ven. Kolonnawe Sri Sumangala Thero (Note: Ven. Kolonnawe Sri Sumangala Thero (JHU) resigned on 8 October 2004. His replacement was Ven. Alawwe Nandaloka Thero (JHU).)	25,154
JHU	JHU	Ven. Aparekke Punnananda Thero	7,389

=== 2010 parliamentary general election ===
Results of the 14th parliamentary election held on 8 April 2010 for the district:

Party	Votes per Polling Division													Postal Votes	Total Votes	%	Seats
Party	Attanagalla	Biyagma	Divulapitiya	Dompe	Gampaha	Ja Ela	Katana	Kelaniya	Mahara	Minuwangoda	Mirigama	Negombo	Wattala	Postal Votes	Total Votes	%	Seats
United People's Freedom Alliance (Note: Including the SLFP.)	51,172	41,478	38,957	46,356	58,268	43,920	49,766	30,276	55,327	49,033	45,428	26,076	31,444	21,975	589,476	63.37%	12
United National Front (Note: Including the UNP, SLMC, DPF, SLFP.)	15,912	20,438	18,026	14,185	17,976	26,397	22,919	16,479	20,387	19,295	17,971	23,987	26,659	5,892	266,523	28.65%	5
Democratic National Alliance (Note: Including the JVP.)	5,626	5,089	2,931	3,709	7,188	6,544	5,228	5,322	7,027	5,270	4,491	3,463	4,929	2,930	69,747	7.50%	1
Independent Group 02	5	47	65	23	47	223	418	37	83	91	15	239	166	10	1,469	0.16%	0
Sri Lanka National Front	36	13	64	34	69	83	52	15	22	31	63	19	87	37	625	0.07%	0
National Development Front	30	15	32	22	18	19	54	20	23	47	18	88	18	5	409	0.04%	0
Independent Group 09	23	13	18	18	25	21	27	21	18	30	24	19	16	6	279	0.03%	0
United National Alternative Front	22	14	12	15	21	16	22	20	19	13	12	13	24	6	229	0.02%	0
Independent Group 13	6	13	6	11	34	8	1	15	7	42	38	11	10	5	207	0.02%	0
Janasetha Peramuna	22	2	4	14	12	10	12	6	4	13	10	50	9	9	177	0.02%	0
United Democratic Front	13	7	4	5	13	10	10	9	15	14	10	8	8	8	134	0.01%	0
Independent Group 15	9	8	5	3	12	6	12	14	13	6	16	4	7	5	120	0.01%	0
Independent Group 11	12	6	15	9	11	6	8	4	3	3	4	11	16	0	108	0.01%	0
Sri Lanka Labour Party	4	7	3	2	9	8	6	8	15	5	1	8	1	2	79	0.01%	0
Independent Group 08	6	2	6	4	2	6	18	4	1	9	6	4	5	3	76	0.01%	0
Patriotic National Front	6	5	4	3	7	6	3	4	8	5	3	5	6	1	66	0.01%	0
Independent Group 05	2	1	6	2	8	6	11	2	4	1	3	5	11	3	65	0.01%	0
Independent Group 14	8	0	1	4	4	7	3	3	9	6	6	3	5	4	63	0.01%	0
Independent Group 03	9	3	2	4	6	3	7	7	1	3	5	2	1	1	54	0.01%	0
Independent Group 10	6	0	0	2	14	4	2	2	6	5	4	2	3	1	51	0.01%	0
Independent Group 01	5	5	3	3	3	7	2	4	4	3	2	3	2	4	50	0.01%	0
Independent Group 07	3	3	0	3	4	4	6	6	1	4	3	1	5	2	45	0.00%	0
Independent Group 06	3	6	2	0	3	2	3	3	3	2	4	6	3	2	42	0.00%	0
All Are Citizens, All Are Kings Organisation	1	2	4	3	3	6	2	1	0	2	5	1	6	4	40	0.00%	0
Independent Group 04	4	1	2	3	3	2	5	2	1	2	3	4	6	1	39	0.00%	0
United Lanka Great Council	1	4	2	2	2	3	3	0	1	3	4	3	3	0	31	0.00%	0
Independent Group 12	2	1	0	0	6	2	0	1	5	1	1	4	6	0	29	0.00%	0
Valid Votes	72,948	67,183	60,174	64,439	83,768	77,329	78,600	52,285	83,007	73,939	68,150	54,039	63,456	30,916	930,233	100.00%	18
Rejected Votes	3,774	2,998	4,017	3,518	3,930	4,208	5,021	2,668	3,925	3,675	3,522	3,711	4,328	939	50,234		
Total Polled	76,722	70,181	64,191	67,957	87,698	81,537	83,621	54,953	86,932	77,614	71,672	57,750	67,784	31,855	980,467		
Registered Electors	120,900	107,786	99,742	104,155	133,606	127,821	127,421	83,105	134,581	120,860	114,566	96,028	103,893		1,474,464		
Turnout	63.46%	65.11%	64.36%	65.25%	65.64%	63.79%	65.63%	66.12%	64.59%	64.22%	62.56%	60.14%	65.24%		66.50%		

Preferential votes
Alliance	Party	Candidate	votes
UPFA	SLFP	Basil Rajapaksa	425,861
UPFA	SLFP	Sudarshani Fernandopulle	186,140
UPFA	SLFP	Mervyn Silva	151,085
UPFA	JHU	Ven. Athuraliye Rathana Thero	112,010
UNF	UNP	Ruwan Wijewardene	88,850
UNF	UNP	Upeksha Swarnamali	81,350
UPFA	SLFP	Felix Perera	69,938
UPFA	SLFP	Ruwan Ranatunga	66,488
UPFA	SLFP	Lasantha Alagiyawanna	65,939
UPFA	SLFP	Sarana Gunawardena	61,150
UNF	UNP	Karu Jayasuriya	60,310
UNF	UNP	Jayalath Jayawardena	58,302
UNF	UNP	John Amaratunga	52,331
UPFA	SLFP	Dulip Wijeysekara	51,469
UPFA	SLFP	Wasantha Senanayake	51,124
DNA	JVP	Vijitha Herath	50,967
UPFA	SLFP	Pandu Bandaranaike	49,613
UPFA	SLFP	Sarath Kumara Gunaratna	46,040

=== 2015 parliamentary general election ===
Results of the 15th parliamentary election held on 17 August 2015:

Party	Votes per Polling Division													Postal Votes	Total Votes	%	Seats
Party	Attanagalla	Biyagma	Divulapitiya	Dompe	Gampaha	Ja Ela	Katana	Kelaniya	Mahara	Minuwangoda	Mirigama	Negombo	Wattala	Postal Votes	Total Votes	%	Seats
United National Front for Good Governance (Note: The alliance consisted of ACMC, DNM, JHU, MTNA, NFGG, SLMC, TPA (DPF, NUW and UCPF), ULF and UNP.)	42,371	41,232	35,725	35,390	42,585	51,807	50,393	31,501	45,446	43,373	39,794	48,517	51,011	17,859	577,004	47.13%	9
United People's Freedom Alliance (Note: The alliance consisted of CWC, CF, DNF, DPC, LBSL, MEP, NC, NFF, PHU, SA (CPSL, DLF, LSSP, NLPP and SLPP), SLFP, TMVP and UCF.)	44,926	42,759	38,471	44,925	53,901	43,051	45,582	28,323	54,362	45,898	41,014	18,928	30,743	17,075	549,958	44.92%	8
Janatha Vimukthi Peramuna	6,973	6,742	3,951	4,557	9,754	8,333	6,662	5,206	8,603	7,400	6,255	3,902	5,141	4,401	87,880	7.18%	1
Democratic Party	327	444	120	317	356	419	297	427	603	291	248	221	315	321	4,706	0.38%	0
Bodu Jana Peramuna	132	212	76	103	154	104	102	169	194	146	106	14	77	75	1,664	0.14%	0
Frontline Socialist Party	39	82	49	30	111	24	41	31	104	37	25	35	55	30	693	0.06%	0
Independent Group 15	67	14	22	8	38	55	57	13	25	36	28	29	37	2	431	0.04%	0
United People's Party	30	38	21	32	30	34	31	21	31	22	38	37	41	9	415	0.03%	0
Independent Group 11	40	17	7	6	59	7	6	4	17	27	28	8	10	5	241	0.02%	0
Janasetha Peramuna	5	16	7	11	19	17	17	22	9	10	32	5	6	9	185	0.02%	0
All Citizens are All Kings Organization	11	6	5	93	12	6	8	6	10	8	6	6	2	5	184	0.02%	0
Nava Sama Samaja Party	13	7	7	4	28	14	8	0	5	29	4	9	10	3	141	0.02%	0
Independent Group 16	10	11	10	12	8	13	9	5	8	7	9	11	10	6	129	0.01%	0
Independent Group 07	4	1	2	1	2	70	2	3	4	3	4	1	13	2	112	0.01%	0
Independent Group 10	7	2	2	9	8	6	10	5	5	12	8	3	5	2	84	0.01%	0
United Peace Front	10	3	4	7	5	8	5	1	7	6	5	3	7	6	77	0.01%	0
Independent Group 12	9	4	3	4	3	6	8	4	0	3	12	2	2	2	62	0.01%	0
Independent Group 01	1	2	4	6	8	4	5	1	4	4	8	3	3	2	55	0.00%	0
Independent Group 05	5	5	0	3	2	8	2	3	4	3	4	2	10	1	52	0.00%	0
Independent Group 02	1	3	2	2	5	11	5	4	2	4	1	3	3	1	50	0.00%	0
Independent Group 08	1	0	1	0	5	3	3	0	3	1	12	12	2	0	43	0.00%	0
Independent Group 09	7	3	4	0	7	3	2	1	2	3	3	1	5	1	42	0.00%	0
Motherland People's Party	1	5	0	3	1	5	5	4	2	2	7	3	1	2	41	0.00%	0
Independent Group 14	4	1	0	10	2	2	5	0	4	1	5	2	3	0	39	0.00%	0
Independent Group 06	1	3	0	1	3	1	10	0	3	2	5	4	1	0	34	0.00%	0
Independent Group 04	4	1	1	1	4	0	3	1	4	4	2	4	1	0	30	0.00%	0
Independent Group 13	2	3	0	2	1	3	2	2	4	2	1	1	1	1	25	0.00%	0
Independent Group 03	1	3	2	2	1	4	0	1	1	0	1	5	3	0	24	0.00%	0
Valid Votes	95,005	91,619	78,496	85,539	107,112	104,108	103,280	65,758	109,466	97,334	87,665	71,771	87,518	39,820	1,224,401	100.00%	18
Rejected Votes	4,880	3,737	3,707	3,712	4,457	4,283	5,522	3,024	4,646	4,667	3,997	4,191	4,392	1,026	56,246	4.39%	
Total Polled	99,885	95,356	82,202	89,256	111,569	108,301	108,802	68,782	114,112	102,001	91,662	75,962	91,910	40,846	1,280,647	78.21%	
Registered Electors	133,023	121,702	108,529	115,356	147,280	143,843	143,885	90,122	149,453	132,981	124,679	106,213	120,471		1,637,537		

Preferential votes
Alliance	Party	Candidate	votes
UPFA	SLFP	Prasanna Ranatunga	384,448
UNFGG	UNP	Ranjan Ramanayake	216,463
UNFGG	DNM	Arjuna Ranatunga	165,890
UNFGG	UNP	Ruwan Wijewardene	157,932
UNFGG	UNP	Harshana Rajakaruna	122,455
UNFGG	UNP	Ajith Mannapperuma	113,889
UPFA	SLFP	Prasanna Ranaweera	112,395
UPFA	SLFP	Nimal Lanza	94,375
UPFA	SLFP	Sisira Jayakody	90,749
UNFGG	UNP	John Amaratunga	83,070
UNFGG	UNP	Kavinda Jayawardena	81,383
UPFA	SLFP	Indika Anuruddha	78,109
UPFA	SLFP	Sudarshani Fernandopulle	73,553
UNFGG	DNM	Chathura Senarathne	71,243
UNFGG	UNP	Edward Gunasekara	65,874
UPFA	SLFP	Duleep Wijesekera	58,936
UPFA	SLFP	Lasantha Alagiyawanna	57,450
JVP	JVP	Vijitha Herath	55,299

=== 2020 parliamentary general election ===
Results of the 16th parliamentary election held on 5 August 2020:

Party	Votes per Polling Division													Postal Votes	Total Votes	%	Seats
Party	Attanagalla	Biyagma	Divulapitiya	Dompe	Gampaha	Ja Ela	Katana	Kelaniya	Mahara	Minuwangoda	Mirigama	Negombo	Wattala	Postal Votes	Total Votes	%	Seats
Sri Lanka People's Freedom Alliance (Note: The alliance consisted of CWC, CPSL, DLF, DVJP, EPDP, LSSP, MEP, MTK, NC, NFF, PHU, SLFP, SLMP, SLPP, TMVP, UPP & VDJS.)	62,674	62,301	51,251	64,663	73,455	67,798	70,062	39,172	76,227	65,763	55,063	36,536	47,230	35,701	807,896	65.76%	13
Samagi Jana Balawegaya (Note: The alliance consisted of JHU, SLMC, TPA (NUW, DPF, UCPF), ACMC, NLNP & JSP.)	21,324	18,077	17,826	15,749	17,481	25,723	25,055	17,684	21,287	20,225	18,034	25,023	34,706	7,615	285,809	23.27%	4
National People's Power (Note: Including JVP.)	4,675	4,374	2,675	2,681	6,372	5,944	5,041	3,421	5,789	4,757	4,685	3,834	3,744	3,841	61,833	5.03%	1
United National Party	2,610	3,051	1,621	1,207	1,681	2,022	1,775	1,501	2,692	1,925	1,916	2,784	2,138	1,359	28,282	2.3%	0
Our People's Power Party	2,199	1,711	1,474	1,065	2,140	1,147	1,510	1,045	1,760	1,973	3,630	618	661	694	21,627	1.76%	0
Independent Group 04	324	557	185	259	821	508	372	596	634	549	226	218	260	161	5,670	0.46%	0
National Development Front	263	306	234	377	399	392	391	195	350	297	233	257	292	63	4,049	0.33%	0
Independent Group 09	142	93	134	165	124	130	156	76	135	174	183	143	116	20	1,791	0.15%	0
Frontline Socialist Party	127	140	113	70	223	78	89	66	150	97	107	99	93	82	1,534	0.12%	0
Socialist Party of Sri Lanka	82	86	64	86	84	90	83	55	106	125	114	67	95	38	1,175	0.1%	0
Independent Group 18	87	48	75	74	71	71	85	41	62	85	93	62	68	23	945	0.08%	0
Jana Setha Peramuna	48	48	74	83	53	73	79	53	67	60	60	56	117	21	892	0.07%	0
Independent Group 11	54	34	57	63	51	61	49	39	51	55	59	47	51	7	678	0.06%	0
Independent Group 13	53	38	52	46	40	40	51	30	36	50	54	28	34	8	560	0.05%	0
Sri Lanka Labour Party	43	44	30	43	44	52	48	28	49	47	42	35	44	8	557	0.05%	0
Democratic United National Front	118	28	22	25	27	16	23	34	26	26	114	26	20	34	539	0.04%	0
New Democratic Front	46	36	61	42	31	34	45	29	42	58	38	30	33	12	537	0.04%	0
Independent Group 03	22	14	13	37	175	27	22	7	73	56	15	35	13	19	528	0.04%	0
Sinhaladeepa National Front	29	80	13	17	58	15	29	22	47	42	23	34	34	27	470	0.04%	0
Motherland People's Party	38	73	16	52	27	9	15	28	37	25	25	15	13	21	394	0.03%	0
Independent Group 15	30	25	20	27	21	18	26	37	21	23	26	36	22	7	353	0.03%	0
New Sinhala Heritage	20	9	24	22	13	24	20	15	21	14	25	20	20	15	264	0.02%	0
Independent Group 14	18	26	20	26	14	14	14	16	20	30	22	14	20	10	264	0.02%	0
Independent Group 17	35	10	13	22	16	12	17	11	15	17	29	14	26	11	248	0.02%	0
Independent Group 12	12	5	29	7	6	17	41	12	6	50	7	25	11	10	238	0.02%	0
Independent Group 06	12	12	9	6	13	23	19	8	14	18	27	34	18	8	221	0.02%	0
Independent Group 05	11	15	9	31	15	21	10	12	23	10	4	22	16	4	203	0.02%	0
Independent Group 10	15	10	10	16	9	17	9	4	12	16	15	14	24	8	179	0.01%	0
Independent Group 02	22	9	12	9	11	13	9	5	18	7	18	15	11	11	170	0.01%	0
Independent Group 01	14	6	10	10	16	10	10	1	9	9	15	34	10	15	169	0.01%	0
Independent Group 16	10	10	10	10	5	17	15	10	14	17	19	11	9	3	160	0.01%	0
Independent Group 07	6	7	4	9	7	11	10	6	15	7	8	16	31	19	156	0.01%	0
Independent Group 08	6	5	3	7	5	7	6	2	6	10	5	10	7	4	83	0.01%	0
Valid Votes	95,169	91,288	71,163	87,006	103,508	104,434	105,186	64,261	109,814	96,617	84,934	70,212	90,003	49,879	1,228,474	100.00%	18
Rejected Votes	6,162	4,946	4,780	4,067	5,319	6,258	7,234	4,090	6,250	5,830	5,476	5,780	6,673	2,644	75,509	4.23%	
Total Polled	101,331	96,234	80,943	91,073	108,827	110,692	112,420	68,351	116,064	102,447	90,410	75,992	96,676	52,523	1,303,983	73.01%	
Registered Electors	137,300	130,751	111,857	120,061	153,947	156,003	156,287	94,950	160,034	139,540	126,021	112,012	133,103	54,098	1,785,964		

Preferential votes
Alliance	Party	Candidate	votes
SLPFA	SLPP	Nalaka Godahewa	325,479
SLPFA	SLPP	Prasanna Ranatunga	316,544
SLPFA	SLPP	Indika Anuruddha	136,297
SLPFA	SLPP	Sisira Jayakody	113,130
SJB	SJB	Sarath Fonseka	110,555
SLPFA	SLPP	Nimal Lanza	108,945
SJB	SJB	Ranjan Ramanayake	103,992
SLPFA	SLPP	Sahan Pradeep Withana	97,494
SLPFA	SLPP	Sudarshani Fernandopulle	89,329
SLPFA	SLPP	Prasanna Ranaweera	83,203
SLPFA	SLPP	Kokila Gunawardena	77,922
SJB	SJB	Harshana Rajakaruna	73,617
SLPFA	SLFP	Lasantha Alagiyawanna	73,061
SLPFA	SLPP	Nalin Fernando	69,800
SLPFA	SLPP	Milan Jayathilaka	68,449
SLPFA	SLPP	Upul Mahendra	67,756
SJB	SJB	Kavinda Jayawardena	52,026
NPP	JVP	Vijitha Herath	37,008

== Provincial Council Elections ==
=== 1988 provincial council election ===
Results of the 1st Western provincial council election held on 2 June 1988 for the district:

Party	Votes	%	Seats
United National Party	243,694	49.03%	18
United Socialist Alliance (Note: Including the CPSL, LSSP, NSSP, SLMP.)	212,679	42.8%	15
Liberal Party	26,962	5.42%	2
Sri Lanka Muslim Congress	13,680	2.75%	1
Valid Votes	497,015	100.00%	36

=== 1993 provincial council election ===
Results of the 2nd Western provincial council election held on 17 May 1993 for the district:

Party	Votes	%	Seats
People's Alliance (Note: Including the SLFP.)	353,602	45.65%	17
United National Party	320,065	41.32%	15
Democratic United National Front	88,362	11.43%	4
Sri Lanka Muslim Congress	7,078	0.91%	0
Nava Sama Samaja Party	4,815	0.62%	0
Independent Group 01	610	0.07%	0
Valid Votes	774,532	100.00%	36

=== 1999 provincial council election ===
Results of the 3rd Western provincial council election held on 6 April 1999:

Party	Votes per Polling Division													Postal Votes	Total Votes	%	Seats
Party	Attanagalla	Biyagma	Divulapitiya	Dompe	Gampaha	Ja Ela	Katana	Kelaniya	Mahara	Minuwangoda	Mirigama	Negombo	Wattala	Postal Votes	Total Votes	%	Seats
People's Alliance (Note: Including the SLFP, SLMC et al.)	39,599	24,848	26,399	28,707	36,453	30,573	34,001	18,877	31,566	29,746	24,903	22,121	23,137	5,234	376,176	48.3%	17
United National Party	19,128	22,740	22,696	21,904	21,891	26,939	25,968	19,581	23,948	26,578	27,459	24,387	27,691	3,510	317,698	40.79%	15
Janatha Vimukthi Peramuna	5,300	4,128	2,510	3,854	7,004	4,806	3,177	4,924	6,510	5,400	5,381	1,677	3,246	580	58,277	7.48%	3
Mahajana Eksath Peramuna	1,348	1,655	1,278	583	1,544	705	603	2,899	1,301	1,333	973	255	735	300	15,492	1.99%	1
New Left Front (Note: Including the NSSP et al.)	805	392	505	637	564	789	886	309	640	542	487	1,220	614	39	8,409	1.08%	0
Muslim United Liberation Front	220	218	21	55	44	54	87	164	102	58	62	175	63	6	1,347	0.17%	0
Sinhalaye Mahasammatha Bhoomiputra Pakshaya	94	37	31	57	104	48	51	97	83	59	56	33	39	18	807	0.1%	0
Sri Lanka Progressive Front	57	34	21	19	96	58	21	41	101	52	42	14	100	7	663	0.09%	0
Valid Votes	68,551	54,048	56,481	55,596	67,700	63,952	64,794	47,186	64,269	63,788	59,343	49,882	55,625	9,694	778,869	100.00%	36
Rejected Votes	4,706	3,051	3,118	3,061	4,120	3,900	4,246	3,061	3,823	3,917	3,470	3,283	3,506	502	48,262	5.83%	
Total Polled	71,257	57,099	59,577	58,857	71,820	67,852	69,040	50,247	68,092	67,885	63,313	53,165	59,131	10,196	827,131	68.16%	
Registered Electors	100,036	85,996	81,978	85,898	109,577	103,443	99,203	77,119	106,244	96,859	95,615	83,276	88,328		1,213,589		

Preferential votes
Party	Candidate	votes
PA	Lasantha Alagiyawanna	70,070
PA	Prasanna Ranatunga	62,656
PA	Sarath Keerthiratne	50,381
UNP	Edward Gunasekara	48,553
PA	Sarana Gunawardena	43,933
PA	Sunil Wijeratne	36,542
PA	Nandana Mendis	33,022
UNP	Lorenz Madiwela	32,293
UNP	Udena Wijerathna	31,727
PA	Lalith Wanigaratne	31,008
PA	Sarath Kumara Gunaratna	30,697
PA	Ananda Ranjith Roopasinghe	29,579
PA	Edward Silva Dewagirige	29,191
PA	Sardhatissa Sakalasooriya	28,212
PA	Ananda Premachandra	27,911
UNP	George Perera	26,123
UNP	Gamini Gunaratne	25,509
PA	Duleep Wijesekera	24,725
UNP	Susantha Senanayake	24,693
UNP	Upul Dewa Wanawasa	24,373
UNP	Chandrasoma Saranalal	24,304
UNP	Abayasiri Ramanayake	24,266
PA	Nihal Premasiri	23,971
UNP	Olitha Premathiratne	23,934
UNP	Nalin Dissanayake	23,884
UNP	Ananda Samarasekara	23,806
PA	Ananda Moonasinghe	23,620
UNP	Ajith Prasanna Seneviratne	23,107
UNP	Ariyapala Uduwevidana	22,972
UNP	Philician de Silva	22,920
PA	Abesekara Hewadewage	22,439
PA	Lionel Jayasinghe	22,375
JVP	Gihan Wijesinghe	4,827
MEP	Sisira Jayakody	4,631
JVP	Anjan Umma	4,336
JVP	A. A. Diyamantha	4,286

=== 2004 provincial council election ===
Results of the 4th Western provincial council election held on 10 July 2004 for the district:

Party	Votes per Polling Division													Postal Votes	Total Votes	%	Seats
Party	Attanagalla	Biyagma	Divulapitiya	Dompe	Gampaha	Ja Ela	Katana	Kelaniya	Mahara	Minuwangoda	Mirigama	Negombo	Wattala	Postal Votes	Total Votes	%	Seats
United People's Freedom Alliance (Note: Includung the SLFP, JVP.)	34,731	27,163	26,522	31,198	37,572	32,434	31,872	21,286	36,457	32,425	30,664	22,098	21,174	7,285	392,881	61.35%	24
United National Party	12,614	16,802	17,611	14,615	14,460	20,082	16,959	14,923	16,371	17,925	16,991	15,928	20,792	2,830	218,903	34.19%	14
Sri Lanka Muslim Congress	4,653	2,631	15	379	24	25	387	1,209	790	1,183	1,575	3,447	287	16	16,621	2.60%	1
Western People's Front	11	12	9	9	14	127	86	419	32	11	29	413	1,626	0	2,798	0.44%	0
Sinhalaye Mahasammatha Bhoomiputra Pakshaya	114	67	1,200	29	111	39	431	82	137	195	40	19	48	52	2,564	0.40%	0
United Socialist Party	173	219	190	187	127	187	183	180	177	194	191	165	224	22	2,419	0.38%	0
National Development Front	113	128	143	94	134	365	411	98	166	152	84	206	260	7	2,361	0.37%	0
Independent Group 03	478	11	32	27	14	7	6	1	13	8	179	4	8	6	794	0.12%	0
Independent Group 04	29	16	17	17	20	16	18	7	22	34	20	18	17	7	258	0.04%	0
United Sinhala Great Council	18	15	20	18	16	16	18	7	14	21	11	20	34	8	236	0.04%	0
Sri Lanka Progressive Front	29	12	6	8	8	7	8	17	18	12	12	10	11	1	159	0.02%	0
Liberal Party	6	11	4	29	11	10	10	5	13	9	9	9	12	4	142	0.02%	0
Independent Group 01	14	4	6	5	8	8	10	8	9	10	9	9	4	6	110	0.02%	0
Independent Group 02	9	3	5	11	4	6	8	14	4	11	8	5	11	1	100	0.02%	0
Valid Votes	52,992	47,094	45,780	46,626	52,523	53,329	50,407	38,256	54,223	52,190	49,822	42,351	44,508	10,245	640,346	100.00%	39
Rejected Votes	3,649	2,608	2,400	2,647	3,434	3,183	3,028	2,668	3,176	3,335	3,009	2,177	2,727	749	38,790		
Total Polled	56,641	49,702	48,180	49,273	55,957	56,512	53,435	40,924	57,399	55,525	52,831	44,528	47,235	10,994	679,136		
Registered Electors	109,731	96,568	90,352	94,755	120,833	113,559	110,706	80,329	117,826	107,679	104,122	88,773	91,912		1,327,145		
Turnout	51.62%	51.47%	53.32%	52.00%	46.31%	49.76%	48.27%	50.95%	48.72%	51.57%	50.74%	50.16%	51.39%		51.17%		

Preferential votes
Party	Candidate	votes
UPFA	Waruna Deepthi Rajapaksha	56,118
UPFA	Prasanna Ranatunga	46,135
UPFA	Eraj Crishantha de Alwis	43,064
UPFA	Ashoka Ranwala	35,623
UPFA	Ananda Ranjith Rupasinghe	34,614
UPFA	Duleep Wijesekera	34,509
UPFA	Sunil Wijerathna	33,496
UPFA	Gihan Wijesinghe	32,992
UPFA	Nimal Lanza	31,502
UPFA	Sardhathissa Sakalasooriya	31,356
UPFA	Sarath Kumara Gunaratna	29,411
UPFA	U. A. Nandaseeli	29,107
UPFA	Kulasiri de Silva	28,326
UPFA	Meril Perera	27,513
UPFA	Wimalasena Silva	26,865
UPFA	Nandana Mendis	26,083
UPFA	Kinsley Kasthuriarachchi	25,739
UPFA	Lalith Wanigarathna	24,710
UPFA	Gunasiri Jayanath	24,480
UNP	Gamini Gunarathna	23,947
UPFA	Sisira Jayakody	23,859
UNP	Upul Deva Wanawasa	23,632
UNP	George Perera	23,339
UPFA	Ashantha Namal Gunawardhana	22,097
UPFA	Chandana Jayakody	21,907
UPFA	Nihal Premasiri	21,694
UNP	Lorenz Madiwela	21,591
UNP	Chandrasoma Saranalal	21,458
UPFA	R. Waragoda	21,446
UNP	A. K. Paul Perera	21,195
UNP	Edward Silva Digirige	20,629
UNP	Philician de Silva	18,637
UNP	Clarance Thushara Perera	17,868
UNP	Kithsiri Manchanayake	15,757
UNP	Ananda Samarasekara	15,529
UNP	Palitha Lihiniyakumara	15,066
UNP	Abhayasiri Ramanayake	14,996
UNP	Douglas Morine Fernando	14,246
SLMC	Mohamed Shaffi Raheem	3,001

=== 2009 provincial council election ===
Results of the 5th Western provincial council election held on 25 April 2009 for the district:

Party	Votes per Polling Division													Postal Votes	Total Votes	%	Seats
Party	Attanagalla	Biyagma	Divulapitiya	Dompe	Gampaha	Ja Ela	Katana	Kelaniya	Mahara	Minuwangoda	Mirigama	Negombo	Wattala	Postal Votes	Total Votes	%	Seats
United People's Freedom Alliance (Note: Including the SLFP.)	51,661	45,061	42,097	48,383	60,210	50,015	53,286	32,388	59,679	55,692	45,740	32,475	36,467	11,376	624,530	69.07%	27
United National Party	12,763	18,241	17,387	14,315	16,968	23,430	21,921	14,694	18,163	17,466	17,728	17,823	22,657	2,700	236,256	26.13%	10
Janatha Vimukthi Peramuna	1,553	1,689	1,063	1,313	2,590	1,853	1,385	1,406	2,270	1,503	2,223	777	1,303	563	21,491	2.38%	1
Sri Lanka Muslim Congress	4,321	2,086	53	159	9	97	610	1,521	984	941	1,352	3,558	2,291	32	18,014	1.99%	1
Democratic Unity Alliance	376	88	14	16	44	59	48	87	120	55	155	83	276	3	1,424	0.16%	0
United Socialist Party	29	41	56	46	28	57	59	50	51	40	71	54	71	4	657	0.07%	0
Independent Group 04	42	32	35	56	69	48	57	32	54	41	36	32	34	0	568	0.06%	0
Ruhunu People's Party	10	36	6	5	15	289	34	11	9	6	2	26	37	1	487	0.05%	0
National Development Front	15	24	13	17	15	16	20	13	25	21	19	16	15	0	229	0.03%	0
Independent Group 02	28	12	1	3	4	2	9	23	16	7	10	18	14	0	147	0.02%	0
Democratic United National Front	4	3	1	2	3	17	4	12	5	5	3	1	46	1	107	0.01%	0
Sinhalaye Mahasammatha Bhoomiputra Pakshaya	8	9	6	8	8	4	8	8	6	10	3	6	8	3	95	0.01%	0
Independent Group 01	8	2	4	4	5	5	4	3	6	8	5	7	7	2	70	0.01%	0
Independent Group 03	6	4	1	7	4	5	4	7	6	3	5	3	4	1	60	0.01%	0
United Lanka Great Council	7	1	1	2	4	3	1	1	5	2	6	14	4	4	55	0.01%	0
Valid Votes	70,831	67,329	60,738	64,336	79,976	75,900	77,450	50,256	81,399	75,800	67,358	54,893	63,234	14,690	904,190	100.00%	39
Rejected Votes	2,436	1,789	1,910	1,792	2,295	2,183	2,639	1,632	2,325	2,310	2,324	1,912	2,232	391	28,170		
Total Polled	73,267	69,118	62,648	66,128	82,271	78,083	80,089	51,888	83,724	78,110	69,682	56,805	65,466	15,081	932,360		
Registered Electors	119,299	106,550	98,572	103,058	132,375	126,026	125,510	83,239	132,781	119,350	113,421	94,871	103,243		1,458,295		
Turnout	61.41%	64.87%	63.56%	64.17%	62.15%	61.96%	63.81%	62.34%	63.05%	65.45%	61.44%	59.88%	63.41%		63.93%		

Preferential votes
Party	Candidate	votes
UPFA	Prasanna Ranatunga	186,338
UPFA	Nimal Lanza	76,156
UPFA	Pradeep Perera	62,948
UPFA	Sunil Wijerartna	58,444
UPFA	Lalith Wanigarathna	53,773
UNP	Ruwan Wijewardene	53,756
UPFA	Sisira Jayakody	49,975
UPFA	Ananda Ranjith Rupasinghe	49,058
UPFA	Chandrika Sakalasooriya	48,852
UPFA	Meril Perera	48,176
UPFA	Ananda Harishchandra De Silva	47,687
UPFA	H. M. G. B. Kotakadeniya	47,139
UPFA	Kokila Gunawardena	46,997
UPFA	Gunasiri Jayanath	42,068
UPFA	Nihal Premasiri	40,142
UPFA	Sandya Siriwardhana	39,542
UPFA	Ravindra Prasad Perera	38,836
UNP	Harshana Rajakaruna	37,485
UNP	Ajith Mannapperuma	37,330
UPFA	Lionel Jayasinghe	37,240
UPFA	Upali Gunaratne	33,795
UPFA	Clerance Thushara Perera	33,441
UPFA	Kamal Kuruppu	31,332
UNP	Sudesh Mahendra Perera	30,843
UPFA	Chandana Jayakody	29,663
UPFA	Randeer Rodrigo	29,072
UNP	George Perera	29,033
UPFA	Darshana Mallawa	28,311
UPFA	Shalitha Lakshman Wijesundara	27,951
UPFA	Dilip Kumara Rajapaksha	27,399
UPFA	R. Waragoda	27,336
UPFA	Doltan Janaka	26,186
UNP	Kithsiri Manchanayake	23,804
UNP	Margret Rose Fernando	22,439
UNP	Udena Wijerathna	19,607
UNP	A. K. Paul Perera	18,705
UNP	Shirantha Amarasekara	18,472
SLMC	Mohamed Shaffi Raheem	12,344
JVP	Waruna Deepthi Rajapaksha	5,689

=== 2014 provincial council election ===
Results of the 6th Western provincial council election held on 29 March 2014:

Party	Votes per Polling Division													Postal Votes	Total Votes	%	Seats
Party	Attanagalla	Biyagma	Divulapitiya	Dompe	Gampaha	Ja Ela	Katana	Kelaniya	Mahara	Minuwangoda	Mirigama	Negombo	Wattala	Postal Votes	Total Votes	%	Seats
United People's Freedom Alliance (Note: Including the Sri Lanka Freedom Party.)	50,735	40,473	40,666	44,256	50,227	46,286	50,857	28,200	55,286	51,035	43,418	28,763	36,550	15,816	582,668	57.98%	24
United National Party	13,663	19,859	17,835	18,277	16,663	25,364	22,491	13,030	17,872	18,205	16,957	22,687	22,642	3,701	249,230	24.80%	10
Democratic Party	6,333	6,691	4,823	5,206	10,143	7,267	9,083	5,677	9,136	6,759	5,550	3,294	5,432	3,163	88,557	8.81%	4
Janatha Vimukthi Peramuna	4,244	5,073	2,112	2,774	6,767	5,534	3,964	4,288	5,965	4,809	3,763	2,330	3,433	1,344	56,405	5.61%	2
Sri Lanka Muslim Congress	4,504	1,924	98	402	16	41	609	1,349	1,121	858	1,256	3,946	1,143	32	17,296	1.72%	1
Democratic People's Front	112	43	15	21	36	313	321	557	81	36	27	1,388	3,873	21	6,844	0.68%	0
Jana Setha Peramuna	208	59	15	32	137	22	18	52	55	64	53	11	84	21	831	0.08%	0
United Lanka People's Party	34	28	27	28	40	49	41	39	41	44	50	31	35	48	535	0.05%	0
United Lanka Great Council	54	40	19	42	68	36	55	28	53	46	33	11	34	11	530	0.05%	0
Patriotic National Front	22	28	15	38	45	43	38	22	34	25	32	11	28	14	395	0.04%	0
New Sinhala Heritage	16	16	18	16	38	11	10	12	23	25	11	11	24	14	245	0.02%	0
Nava Sama Samaja Party	12	19	3	5	58	16	27	8	16	18	6	18	15	8	229	0.02%	0
Independent Group 09	21	13	9	13	21	14	18	10	12	16	14	10	15	12	198	0.02%	0
Sri Lanka Labour Party	13	13	5	8	17	13	19	4	12	10	10	17	11	3	155	0.02%	0
Independent Group 05	13	9	10	8	14	14	13	15	10	14	8	9	8	1	146	0.01%	0
Independent Group 08	10	26	4	9	6	15	4	17	13	10	5	3	3	2	127	0.01%	0
Independent Group 01	12	22	3	2	15	9	7	7	16	8	3	9	9	3	125	0.01%	0
Independent Group 03	7	7	4	8	5	12	14	4	12	7	11	10	12	2	115	0.01%	0
Independent Group 07	7	5	10	5	8	3	8	3	11	5	8	6	5	5	89	0.00%	0
Independent Group 06	5	6	2	13	14	12	7	2	5	4	4	4	5	3	86	0.00%	0
Independent Group 02	7	13	2	3	10	7	8	7	3	4	2	7	8	4	85	0.00%	0
Independent Group 04	11	5	4	3	4	5	3	11	5	3	4	1	2	0	71	0.00%	0
Valid Votes	80,047	74,372	65,699	71,174	84,322	85,086	87,615	53,342	89,782	82,005	71,225	62,574	73,481	24,228	1,004,952	100.00%	41
Rejected Votes	3,267	2,777	2,396	2,442	3,706	3,394	3,651	2,328	3,665	3,070	3,058	2,649	3,304	1,006	40,713		
Total Polled	83,314	77,149	68,095	73,616	88,028	88,480	91,266	55,670	93,447	85,075	74,283	65,223	76,685	25,234	1,045,665		
Registered Electors	130,058	117,747	106,431	112,475	144,152	138,704	139,658	86,853	144,717	129,885	121,853	103,115	114,428		1,590,076		

Preferential votes
Party	Candidate	votes
UPFA	Prasanna Ranatunga	249,678
UPFA	Nimal Lanza	106,661
UPFA	Sahan Pradeep Withana	59,892
UPFA	Samanmalee Sakalasooriya	53,447
UNP	Harshana Rajakaruna	51,018
UPFA	Sisira Jayakody	43,331
UPFA	Sunil Wijerathne	42,488
UNP	Kavinda Jayawardena	41,654
UPFA	Kokila Gunawardena	40,291
UPFA	Meril Perera	40,180
UPFA	Ananda Ranjith Rupasinghe	38,477
UPFA	Upul Mahendra	37,674
UPFA	Susara Dinal Silva	37,598
UPFA	Gunasiri Jayanath	36,240
UPFA	Lakshman Gunawardhana	33,781
UPFA	Lalith Wanigarathna	32,713
UPFA	Ananda Harishchandra De Silva	30,833
UPFA	Nirosha Athukoralage	30,807
UPFA	Chandana Jayakody	30,081
UNP	Edward Gunasekara	29,944
UPFA	Lionel Jayasingha	29,863
UNP	Priyantha Perera	29,703
UNP	Shirantha Amarasekara	29,559
UNP	Wijitha Fernando	29,291
UNP	Margret Rose Fernando	29,267
UPFA	Upali Gunaratne	29,215
UPFA	Sandya Siriwardhana	29,206
UPFA	Upul Rajitha	27,308
UPFA	Ravindra Prasad Perera	26,396
UPFA	Nirosh Dilshan	25,489
UPFA	Lalantha Gunasekara	25,419
UNP	Sudesh Mahendra Perera	24,728
UNP	Udena Wijerathna	23,712
UNP	Pushpakumara De Silva	20,390
JVP	Mahinda Jayasinghe	15,933
DP	Rajitha Rangana	14,644
DP	Anuruddha Lekamge	14,058
SLMC	Mohamed Shaffi Raheem	12,335
DP	Asoka Dayarathna	9,985
DP	Indika Bandara	9,270
JVP	Ashoka Ranwala	7,437
