= Ajith Mannapperuma =

Sri Lankan politician

Hon. Ajith Mannapperuma MP
- අජිත් මාන්නප්පෙරුම அஜித் மன்னப்பெரும

Member of Parliament for Gampaha District
- In office 9 April 2021 – 24 September 2024
- Preceded by: Ranjan Ramanayake
- In office 4 June 2013 – 3 April 2020
- Preceded by: Jayalath Jayawardena

Personal details
- Born: 25 June 1963 (age 62)
- Party: Samagi Jana Balawegaya
- Profession: Civil Engineer

Ajith Mannapperuma (Born 25 July 1963) is a Sri Lankan politician. A current Member of Parliament from Gampaha District, he was a former state minister of Mahaveli Development and Environment.

== Education ==
Educated at Holy Cross College, Gampaha; Bandaranayake College and Ananda College; he graduated from the Faculty of Engineering of the University of Moratuwa and became a Civil Engineer. And also He ranked island 9th in Advance Level exam in year 1982 in math stream and entered to University of Moratuwa Sri Lanka. He is alumni from University of Moratuwa.

== Political career ==
Mannapperuma joined the United National Party and entered local government politics. He served as the first mayor of Gampaha from 2002 to 2009, before being elected to the Western Provincial Council in 2009. He entered parliament in 2013 from the Gampaha District following the unexpected demise of Jayalath Jayawardena. Mannapperuma was returned to parliament in 2015 from the Gampaha District. In 2021, he failed to gained the required preferential votes to be elected to parliament, however was appointed to parliament to succeed Ranjan Ramanayake after the latter lost his parliamentary seat following his imprisonment with his conviction of contempt of court.

He withdrew his candidacy after submitting nominations for 2024 parliamentary election, criticizing party leader Sajith Premadasa for dismissing him as SJB chief organiser for Gampaha electorate.

== Personal life ==
In 2014 Mannapperuma lost a limb following an accident on the Southern Expressway.
