= A. R. Anjan Umma =

Sri Lankan politician

Hon. Anjan Umma MP

Member of Parliament for National List
- In office 2000–2001

Member of Parliament for Gampaha District
- In office 2001–2010

Personal details
- Born: 6 September 1955 (age 70)
- Party: National Freedom Front
- Other political affiliations: United People's Freedom Alliance
- Profession: Teacher

Abdul Rahman Anjan Umma (born 6 September 1955) is a Sri Lankan politician and teacher. In the 2004 election, she was elected from the Gampaha District to the Parliament of Sri Lanka as a United People's Freedom Alliance candidate. In June 2008, she left the party she belonged to, the Janatha Vimukthi Peramuna. After a short period as an independent MP, she joined the National Freedom Front. On 31 October 2012 she became a member of the opposition United National Party (UNP).
