= Lasith Bashana =

Sri Lankan politician

Hon. Lasith Bashana MP

Member of Parliament for Gampaha Electoral District
- Incumbent
- Assumed office 15 November 2024

Personal details
- Party: National People's Power
- Profession: Politician

Lasith Bashana (Lasith Bhashana Gamage) is a Sri Lankan politician. He was elected to the Sri Lankan Parliament from Gampaha Electoral District as a member of the National People's Power(NPP).

He is the Former Secretary of Students Union University of Peradeniya. Currently he is the NPP Organizer Committee member at Gampaha Electorate, SYU Gampaha Electorate Organizer & NPP Youth District Committee member.
