= Sudarshani Fernandopulle =

Sri Lankan politician

Hon. (Dr.) Sudarshani Fernandopulle MP MBBS, MSc, MD
- සුදර්ශනි ප්‍රනාන්දුපුල්ලේ சுதர்சனி பெர்னாண்டோபிள்ளை

State Minister of COVID 19 Control, Primary Healthcare and Epidemics
- Incumbent
- Assumed office 30 November 2020
- President: Gotabhaya Rajapakse
- Prime Minister: Mahinda Rajapakse

State Minister of City Planning and Water Supply
- In office 9 September 2015 – 12 April 2018
- President: Maithripala Sirisena
- Prime Minister: Ranil Wickramasinghe

Deputy Minister of Research and Higher Education
- In office 22 March 2015 – 16 July 2015
- President: Maithripala Sirisena
- Prime Minister: Ranil Wickramasinghe

Member of Parliament for Gampaha District
- Incumbent
- Assumed office 2010

Personal details
- Born: 29 October 1960 (age 65) Negombo, Sri Lanka
- Party: Sri Lanka Freedom Party
- Spouse: Jeyaraj Fernandopulle
- Children: Samurdhi and Bhanuka
- Education: Ave Maria Convent, Negombo, Faculty of Medicine, University of Colombo, La Trobe University
- Occupation: Politics
- Profession: Specialist Medical Officer
- Website: Official Website

Sudarshani Fernandopulle (Sinhala:සුදර්ශනි ප්‍රනාන්දුපුල්ලේ) MP (born 29 October 1960) is a Specialist Medical Officer of Community Medicine. Currently she represents the Parliament of Sri Lanka for the United People's Freedom Alliance from Gampaha District and is the State Minister of COVID19 control, Primary Healthcare and Epidemics in Sri Lanka. Previously, she was appointed the Deputy Minister of Higher Education on 22 March 2015 in the First National Government of Sri Lanka.
