= Edward Gunasekara =

Sri Lankan politician

Hon. Edward Gunasekara MP

Member of Parliament for Gampaha District
- Incumbent
- Assumed office 2015
- In office 2000–2010

Personal details
- Party: United National Party
- Other political affiliations: United National Front

Edward Gunasekara is a Sri Lankan politician, a former member of the Parliament of Sri Lanka and a former government minister.
