= Harshana Rajakaruna =

Sri Lankan politician

Hon. Harshana Rajakaruna MP
- හර්ෂණ රාජකරුණා ஹர்ஷன ராஜகருணா

Member of Parliament for Gampaha District
- Incumbent
- Assumed office 2015

Member of the Western Provincial Council
- In office 2009–2015

Personal details
- Party: Samagi Jana Balawegaya (since 2020); United National Party (until 2020)
- Spouse: Shermila Jayathilake
- Relations: Sarathchandra Rajakaruna (father)
- Children: 1
- Education: Royal College, Colombo
- Website: http://www.harshanarajakaruna.com

Rajakaruna Mohotti Appuhamillage Harshana Supun Rajakaruna (born 27 February 1980), commonly known as Harshana Rajakaruna, is a Sri Lankan politician. He is a Member of Parliament from the Samagi Jana Balawegaya and a former member of the Western Provincial Council.

He is the son of politician Sarathchandra Rajakaruna. Rajakaruna was educated at Royal College, Colombo and played on the college cricket team for the Royal–Thomian big match in 1999. He went on to gain a degree in management from the University of Nottingham and an MBA from the University of Wales, Cardiff. On his return to Sri Lanka, he worked at John Keells Stock Brokers as a Senior Investment Advisor.

Rajakaruna was a member of several committees of the United National Party, including the executive committee, National Youth League Working Committee, Sports Committee, Economic Committee and Buddhist Committee. In 2009, he contested the provincial council election and won a seat in the Western Provincial Council.

Rajakaruna was elected to parliament in the 2015 elections. He contested the 2020 parliamentary elections as a candidate of the newly formed Samagi Jana Balawegaya. He obtained the 3rd highest number of preferential votes for the SJB in the Gampaha Electoral District. Rajakaruna was reelected in 2024.
