= Ministry of Indigenous Medicine =

Agency overview
- Formed: 1980
- Jurisdiction: Sri Lanka
- Employees: 1,542
- Annual budget: Rs 1,770,900 Billion
- Minister responsible: Salinda Dissanayake
- Deputy Minister responsible: Pandu Bandaranaike
- Agency executive: Lalith Kannangara, Secretary
- Website: indigenousmedimini.gov.lk

The Ministry of Indigenous Medicine is a Sri Lankan government ministry.

== List of ministers ==
Minister of Indigenous Medicine of Sri Lanka
- Incumbent; Salinda Dissanayake since 22 November 2010
- Ministry of Indigenous Medicine
- Appointer: Mahinda Rajapaksa
- Website: indigenousmedimini.gov.lk

The Minister of Indigenous Medicine is an appointment in the Cabinet of Sri Lanka.

Parties

Sri Lanka Freedom Party United National Party

Name	Portrait	Party	Tenure	President
Tissa Karaliyadda				
Salinda Dissanayake		Sri Lanka Freedom Party	22 November 2010 – Present	Mahinda Rajapaksa

== See also ==
- List of ministries of Sri Lanka
