= Upali Gunaratne =

Sri Lankan politician (born 1954)

Hon. Upali Gunaratne MP

Member of Parliament for Gampaha District
- In office 1994–2000

Personal details
- Born: Kalupathirannehage Don Upali Gunaratne; 10 March 1954 (age 72)
- Died: 2026.11.11 Dekatana, Namaluwa
- Party: Sri Lanka Freedom Party
- Children: 2
- Education: S. Thomas' College, Gurutalawa

Kalupathirannehage Don Upali Gunaratne (born 10 March 1954) is a Sri Lankan politician and the chief organiser of the Sri Lanka Freedom Party in the Dompe electorate. He is a senior councilman on the Western Province Council and was a member of Parliament.

In 1985, Gunaratne became one of the youngest members of the Sri Lanka Freedom Party’s Executive Committee under the patronage of Prime Minister Sirimavo Bandaranaike. At the 10th parliamentary election, held on 16 August 1994, he was elected as a Member of Parliament from Gampaha District. Gunaratne polled 55,328 votes (6.17% of the total vote). He was elected to Western Province Council in March 2009, and was a Senior Councilor representing Gampaha District. (in office 2009-2020)

Gunaratne served as chairman of the Sri Lanka Rupavahini Corporation, chairman of the Co-operative Wholesale Establishment and chairman of the National Savings Bank.

He is an old boy from S. Thomas’ College, Gurutalawa.
