= Milan Jayathilaka =

Sri Lankan politician and Member of Parliament

Hon. Milan Jayathilaka MP
- මිලාන් ජයතිලක (Sinhala); மிலன் ஜெயதிலகே (Tamil)

Member of the Parliament of Sri Lanka
- Incumbent
- Assumed office 2020
- Constituency: Gampaha District

Personal details
- Born: Withana Pathiranage Milan Sajith Jayathilaka; 1 August 1981 (age 45)
- Party: Sri Lanka Podujana Peramuna
- Other political affiliations: Sri Lanka People's Freedom Alliance

Withana Pathiranage Milan Sajith Jayathilaka (born 1 August 1981) is a Sri Lankan politician and Member of Parliament.

Jayathilaka was born on 1 August 1981. He was a member of Dompe Divisional Council. He contested the 2020 parliamentary election as a Sri Lanka People's Freedom Alliance electoral alliance candidate in Gampaha District and was elected to the Parliament of Sri Lanka.

Electoral history of Milan Jayathilaka
Election	Constituency	Party	Alliance	Votes	Result
2020 parliamentary	Gampaha District	Sri Lanka Podujana Peramuna	Sri Lanka People's Freedom Alliance	68,449	Elected
