= Upul Abeywickrama =

Sri Lankan politician

Upul Abeywickrama MP
- උපුල් අබේවික්‍රම உபுல் அபேவிக்ரம
- Abeywickrama in 2024
- Incumbent
- Assumed office 21 November 2024
- Constituency: Gampaha District
- Majority: 60,595 Preferential Votes

Personal details
- Born: U. P. Abeywickrama; 18 August 1968 (age 58) Southern Province, Sri Lanka
- Party: National People's Power
- Other political affiliations: Janatha Vimukthi Peramuna
- Spouse: Janaki Liyanaarachchi (m. 1999)
- Children: 3
- Education: University of Sri Jayewardenepura
- Occupation: Politician, lawyer
- Profession: Lawyer

Upul Abeywickrama (born 18 August 1968), also known as U. P. Abeywickrama, is a Sri Lankan politician and attorney-at-law. A member of the National People's Power (NPP), he was elected to the Parliament of Sri Lanka. in the 2024 Sri Lankan parliamentary election representing Gampaha Electoral District.

== Legal career ==
A 2023 court report named Abeywickrama among the lawyers in a case concerning events during the 2022 Sri Lankan protests, known as Aragalaya.

== Political career ==
Abeywickrama's name appeared on the NPP candidate list for Gampaha District in the 2020 Sri Lankan parliamentary election. Before the 2024 election, The Sunday Times described him as an attorney-at-law and a member of the NPP's Gampaha district executive committee.

He was elected to Parliament from Gampaha District at the 14 November 2024 general election, receiving 60,595 preferential votes.

== Parliamentary work ==
Abeywickrama serves in Sri Lanka's Tenth Parliament. Parliament's records list his appointment to the Legislative Standing Committee in January 2025 and the Committee on Public Petitions in March 2025. He joined the Parliamentary Caucus for Open Parliament Initiative in June 2025.

His parliamentary committee memberships also cover justice and national integration; public security and parliamentary affairs; women and child affairs; and transport, highways, ports and civil aviation.

In May 2025, Sri Lanka's government news service reported that he attended a visit concerning construction of a new court complex in Pugoda with the Minister of Justice, members of the Pugoda Bar Association, and officials.
