= Kavinda Jayawardena =

Sri Lankan politician

Hon. Kavinda Jayawardena MP
- කාවින්ද ජයවර්ධන கவிந்த ஜெயவர்த்தனா

Member of Parliament for Gampaha District
- Incumbent
- Assumed office 2015

Personal details
- Party: Samagi Jana Balawegaya (since 2020); United National Party (until 2020)
- Occupation: Physician
- Website: https://www.drkavindajayawardena.lk/

Senadheerage Don Kavinda Heshan Jayawardena is a Sri Lankan medical graduate and politician. He has served as a Member of Parliament from the Gampaha District since 2015. He previously served as a provincial councilor in the Western Provincial Council.

He is the son of former cabinet minister Jayalath Jayawardena. Jayawardena was educated at Royal College Colombo and studied medicine at Sri Ramachandra University in Chennai, India.
