= Stephani Fernando =

Sri Lankan politician (born 1971)

Stephani Fernando ස්ටෙෆනි ප්‍රනාන්දු

Member of Parliament

Member of Parliament for Gampaha District
- Incumbent
- Assumed office 21 November 2024

Personal details
- Born: 17 February 1971 (age 55)
- Party: National People's Power

Stephani Fernando (born 17 February 1971) is a Sri Lankan politician. A member of the National People's Power, he was elected to the parliament in the 2024 Sri Lankan parliamentary election representing Gampaha Electoral District.
