= Champika Hettiarachchi =

Sri Lankan politician

Champika Hettiarachchi is a Sri Lankan politician. A member of the National People's Power, he was elected to the parliament in the 2024 Sri Lankan parliamentary election representing Gampaha Electoral District.
