= Mahinda Jayasinghe =

Sri Lankan politician

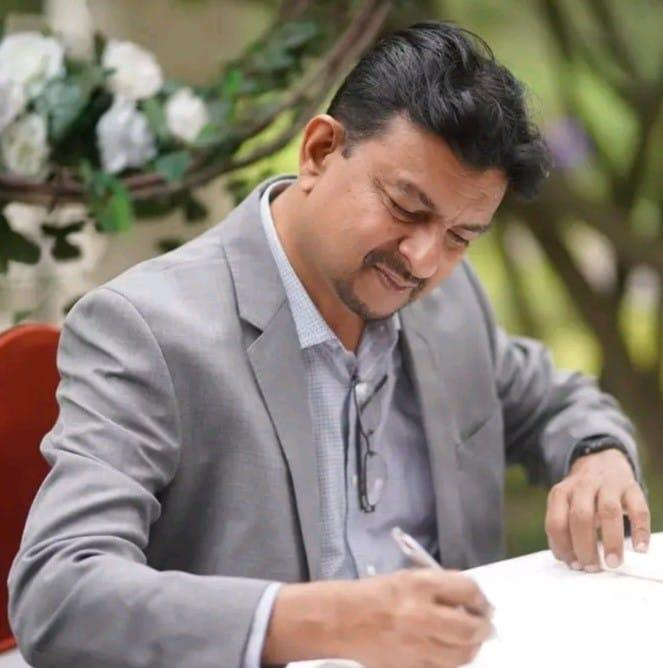
Mahinda Jayasinghe as captured writing on paper

Mahindavansha Jayasinghe, commonly known as Mahinda Jayasinghe, is a Sri Lankan educator, unionist and politician. A member of the National People's Power, he was elected to the parliament in the 2024 Sri Lankan parliamentary election representing Gampaha Electoral District.
