= Ruwanthilake Jayakodi =

Sri Lankan politician

Jayakodi Arachchige Ruwanthilake, commonly known as Ruwanthilake Jayakodi, is a Sri Lankan politician who was elected to the Sri Lankan Parliament from Gampaha Electoral District as a member of the National People's Power.
