= Donald Dissanayake =

Sri Lankan politician

Hon. Donald Dissanayake MP
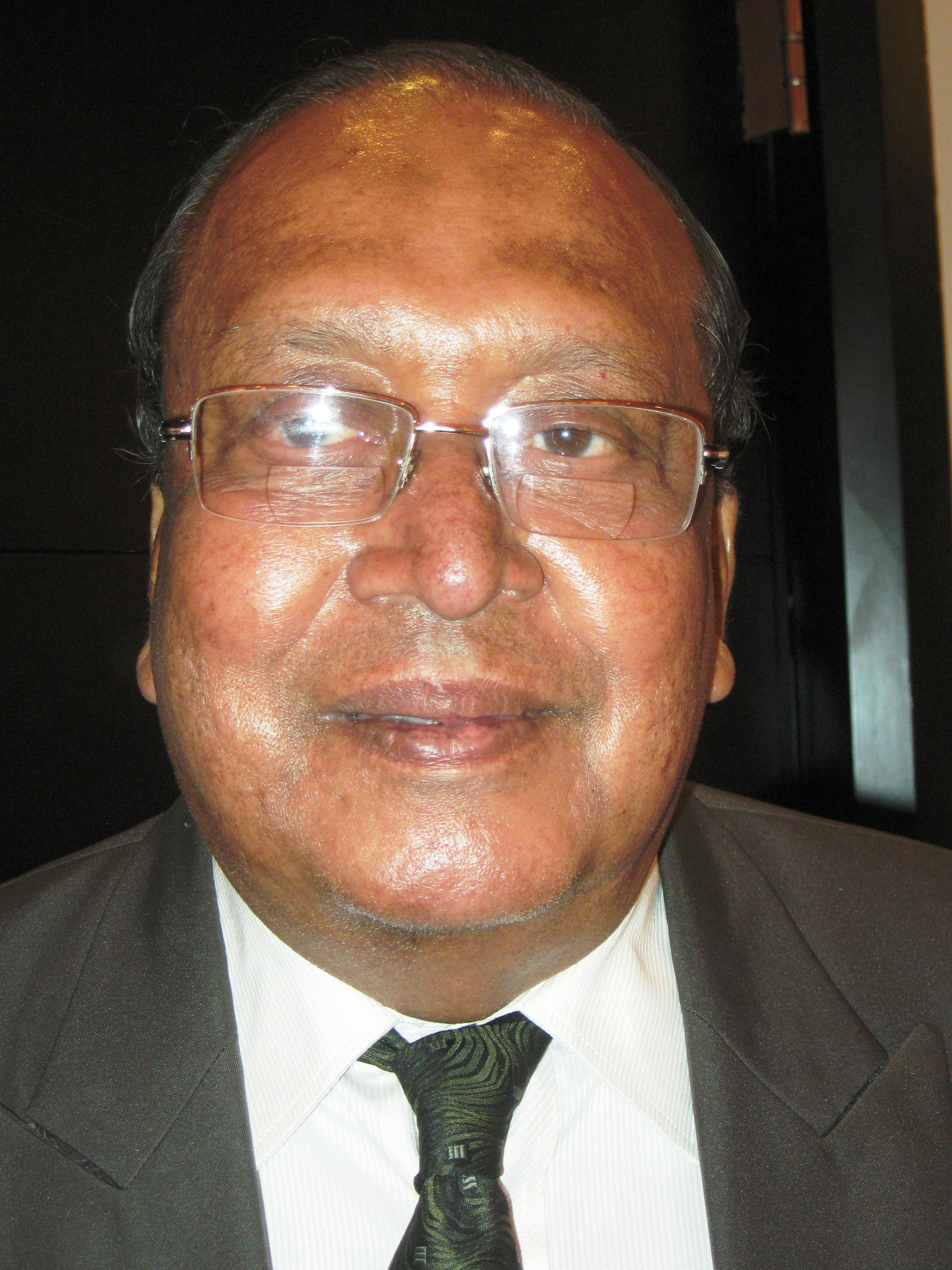
- In office 15 February 1989 – 24 June 1994

Personal details
- Party: United National Party

Jayasinghe Muhandiram Donald Dissanayake (known as Donald Dissanayake) is a Sri Lankan politician and was a former Member of Parliament representing the Gampaha District, Sri Lanka.

== See also ==
- Gampaha Electoral District
