= Upul Mahendra =

Sri Lankan politician

Hon. Upul Mahendra
- උපුල් මහේන්ද්‍ර உபுல் மகேந்திரா

Member of the Parliament of Sri Lanka
- In office 20 August 2020 – 24 September 2024
- Constituency: Gampaha District

Member of the Western Provincial Council
- In office 21 April 2014 – 21 April 2019
- Constituency: Gampaha District

Personal details
- Born: Rajapaksha Pathirannehelage Upul Mahendra Rajapaksha; 25 September 1971 (age 54) Gampaha, Sri Lanka
- Party: Sri Lanka Podujana Peramuna
- Other political affiliations: Sri Lanka People's Freedom Alliance

Rajapaksha Pathirannehelage Upul Mahendra Rajapaksha (born 25 September 1971) is a Sri Lankan politician and former Member of Parliament.

== Political career ==
Upul Mahendra was born on 25 September 1971. He entered politics in 2002 by contesting to the local government election and lost the election. But in 2004 he was selected to the divisional council because one member lost his seat due to disciplinary reason. In 2006 and 2011 local government elections he got the highest number of votes in the division and become a chairperson of the divisional council. He was a chairperson of the Attanagalla Divisional Council from 2006 to 2014. In 2014 He contested to the provincial council election and won. He was a member of the Western Provincial Council from 2014 to 2019. He contested the 2015 parliamentary election as one of the United People's Freedom Alliance (UPFA) electoral alliance's candidates in Gampaha District but failed to get elected after coming 10th amongst the UPFA candidates. He contested the 2020 parliamentary election as a Sri Lanka People's Freedom Alliance electoral alliance candidate in Gampaha District and was elected to the Parliament of Sri Lanka.

== Electoral history ==
Electoral history of Upul Mahendra
Election	Constituency	Party	Alliance	Votes	Result
2014 provincial	Gampaha District	Sri Lanka Freedom Party	United People's Freedom Alliance	37,674	Elected
2015 parliamentary	Gampaha District	Sri Lanka Freedom Party	United People's Freedom Alliance	54,763	Not elected
2020 parliamentary	Gampaha District	Sri Lanka Podujana Peramuna	Sri Lanka People's Freedom Alliance	67,756	Elected
