= Aparekke Punnananda Thero =

Sri Lankan politician

Hon. Aparekke Punnananda MP

Member of Parliament for Gampaha District
- In office 2004–2010

Personal details
- Party: Jathika Hela Urumaya
- Other political affiliations: United People's Freedom Alliance
- Occupation: Buddhist monk

Aparekke Punnananda was a Sri Lankan politician and a former member of the Parliament of Sri Lanka.

== Child sex abuse charges ==
Punnananda appeared before Colombo Magistrates Court on 18 March 2011 after admitting he had sexually abused five underage novice Buddhist monks under his care. Two of Punnananda's alleged victims gave evidence to the magistrate who has ordered the police to produce the other three alleged victims before the court. The magistrate also ordered the police to investigate whether other underage novice monks were abused in the Budhhist temple where Punnananda is the chief incumbent. Punnananda is on bail
