= Muneer Mulaffer =

Sri Lankan politician

Hon. Muneer Mulaffer මුනීර් මුලෆර් MP

Member of Parliament for Gampaha District
- Incumbent
- Assumed office 21 November 2024
- Majority: 109,815 preferential votes

Member of Parliament for Gampaha District

Personal details
- Party: Janatha Vimukthi Peramuna
- Other political affiliations: National People's Power
- Occupation: teacher Islamic Preacher
- Profession: Peace Building & Coexistence

Muneer Mulaffer is a Sri Lankan politician and a member of the National People's Power. He was elected to the parliament in the 2024 Sri Lankan parliamentary election representing Gampaha Electoral District. He is a teacher by profession and a national executive committee member.

== Electoral history ==
Electoral history of Muneer Mulaffer
Election	Constituency	Party	Alliance	Votes	Result	Ref.
2024 parliamentary	Gampaha District	JVP	NPP	109,815	Elected	
