= Ruwan Mapalagama =

Sri Lankan politician

Ruwan Nishantha Mapalagama is a Sri Lankan educator and politician. A member of the National People's Power, he was elected to the parliament in the 2024 Sri Lankan parliamentary election representing Gampaha Electoral District. He was born on 26 January 1985.

== Political career ==
Political career commenced as a member of the main student union at the University of Kelaniya. As a Member of National People's Power, He was elected to the Parliament of Sri Lanka in the 2024 Sri Lankan parliamentary election representing Gampaha Electoral District obtaining 78,673 votes.
