= Udena Wijerathna =

Sri Lankan politician

Western Province Provincial Councillor

Personal details
- Born: Sri Lanka
- Party: United National Party
- Relations: Philip Gunawardena
- Education: Nalanda College, Colombo

Udena Wijerathna is a Western Province Provincial Councillor in Sri Lanka. He belongs to the United National Party.

== Early childhood ==
Udena who was educated at Nalanda College, Colombo is the youngest son of Mahendra Wijerathna former Minister of Livestock Development, Milk Production and Deputy Minister of Trade and Shipping. He is also the grand nephew of Philip Gunawardena and Robert Gunawardena and nephew of former Hiriyala MP S.B. Herath. His only sister is Dr Maheshi Wijerathna who is a Specialist Neuro Surgeon attached to Sri Jayawardenapura General Hospital.

== Politics ==
In 1991 Provincial Council elections Udena received most no of preferential votes in Sri Lanka and became the President of the Provincial Council in Mirigama. In 1998 he became a Provincial Council Minister obtaining the 3rd place in elections.

== See also ==
- List of political families in Sri Lanka
- Gunawardena (Boralugoda Ralahamy)
- 2009 Provincial Council Election
