= Sisira Jayakody =

Sri Lankan politician

Hon. Sisira Jayakody
- සිසිර ජයකොඩි சிசிர ஜெயக்கொடி

Minister of State for Indigenous Medicine (Note: Minister of State for Indigenous Medicine, Rural and Ayurveda Hospital Development and Community Health from 12 August 2020 to 3 April 2022.)
- Incumbent
- Assumed office 12 August 2020
- President: Gotabaya Rajapaksa; Ranil Wickremesinghe
- Prime Minister: Mahinda Rajapaksa; Ranil Wickremesinghe; Dinesh Gunawardena
- Preceded by: Piyankara Jayaratne

Member of Parliament for Gampaha District
- Incumbent
- Assumed office 1 September 2015
- Majority: 113,130 Preferential Votes

Member of the Western Provincial Council
- In office 2004–2009
- Constituency: Gampaha District
- Majority: 49,975 Preferential Votes

Personal details
- Born: 11 March 1965 (age 61) Kelaniya, Dominion of Ceylon (now Sri Lanka)
- Party: Mahajana Eksath Peramuna
- Other political affiliations: Sri Lanka People's Freedom Alliance
- Children: 2
- Education: Nalanda College, Colombo; University of Colombo
- Occupation: Attorney at law
- Profession: lawyer/politician (State Minister of Indigenous Medicine, Rural and Ayurveda Hospital Development and Community Health)

Sisira Jayakody MP is a politician and member of the 15th Parliament of Sri Lanka representing Gampaha. He is the State Minister of Indigenous Medicine, Rural and Ayurveda Hospital Development and Community Health Jayakody was former Western Province Provincial councillor in Sri Lanka. He belongs to the United People's Freedom Alliance.

== Early childhood and education ==
Jayakody who was educated at Nalanda College, Colombo and graduated with a law degree from the Law Faculty of University of Colombo passing out as an Attorney at law.

== Politics and career ==
After graduating from University, Jayakody started his career as a tuition class teacher of Advanced Level Logic subject.

He first entered politics in 1996 at the local government election, contesting for the Kelaniya Pradeshiya Sabha from People's United Party, under the leadership of Dinesh Gunawardena and was elected as the only winner from the party.

In 2004 Provincial Council Elections Jayakody gained 23,859 was elected as Member of the Western Provincial Council. Again in 2009 Provincial Council Election he won 49,975 preference votes and elected. He was also the former Chief Whip of the Western Provincial Council.

== See also ==
- 2009 Provincial Council Election
