= Kokila Gunawardena =

Sri Lankan politician (born 1974)

Hon. Kokila Gunawardena MP
- කෝකිලා ගුණවර්ධන கோகிலா குணவர்த்தன்

Member of the Parliament of Sri Lanka
- Incumbent
- Assumed office 2020
- Constituency: Gampaha District

Member of the Western Provincial Council
- In office 2009–2019
- Constituency: Gampaha District

Personal details
- Born: Kokila Harshani Gunawardena; 28 April 1974 (age 51)
- Party: Sri Lanka Podujana Peramuna
- Other political affiliations: Sri Lanka People's Freedom Alliance

Kokila Harshani Gunawardena (born 28 April 1974) is a Sri Lankan politician, former provincial councillor and Member of Parliament.

Gunawardena was born on 28 April 1974. She is the sister of former provincial councillor Namal Gunawardena. She was educated at Holy Cross College, Gampaha. She worked for SriLankan Airlines. She was the Sri Lanka Freedom Party's organiser in Mirigama.

Gunawardena was a member of the Western Provincial Council. She contested the 2020 parliamentary election as a Sri Lanka People's Freedom Alliance electoral alliance candidate in Gampaha District and was elected to the Parliament of Sri Lanka.

Electoral history of Kokila Gunawardena
Election	Constituency	Party	Alliance	Votes	Result
2009 provincial	Gampaha District	Sri Lanka Freedom Party	United People's Freedom Alliance	46,997	Elected
2014 provincial	Gampaha District	Sri Lanka Freedom Party	United People's Freedom Alliance	40,291	Elected
2020 parliamentary	Gampaha District	Sri Lanka Podujana Peramuna	Sri Lanka People's Freedom Alliance	77,922	Elected
