= Jayalath Jayawardena =

Sri Lankan politician and doctor (1953-2013)

Hon. Jayalath Jayawardena ජයලත් ජයවර්ධන MP
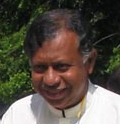

Member of Parliament for Gampaha District
- In office 1994–2013

Personal details
- Born: Ruban Canistus Jayalath Jayawardena; 16 August 1953 Ja-Ela, Sri Lanka
- Died: 30 May 2013 (aged 59) Singapore City, Singapore
- Party: United National Party
- Spouse: Ujitha Jayawardena
- Children: 2 (including Kavinda Jayawardena)
- Education: De Mazenod College
- Profession: Politician, Medical Doctor, Civil Servant

Ruban Canistus Jayalath Jayawardena MP (16 August 1953 – 30 May 2013: Sinhala: ජයලත් ජයවර්ධන), commonly as Jayalath Jayawardena, was a medical doctor who was elected to the Parliament of Sri Lanka for the opposition United National Party (UNP) in 1994. Jayawardena was known as a human rights activist. Jayawardena is also popular for his sheer commitment and loyalty for the UNP.

== Personal life ==
He was born on 16 August 1953 in Weligampitiya, Ja-Ela, Sri Lanka as the eldest son of the late Basil Jayawardena and Daisy Violet Jayawardena. His father was the Head of the Ja-Ela Weligampitiya Group of Companies. He received his primary education at De Mazenod College, Kandana. He completed his Bachelor of Medicine degree in medicine from the Faculty of Medicine, University of Colombo and a master's degree in Medicine from the United States and Russia.

He was married to his longtime partner, Ujitha. The couple had one son, Kavinda and one daughter, Vindya. Kavinda Jayawardena entered active politics after the death of his father. He took the second highest number of preferential votes from Gampaha District in the Provincial Council Election in 2014 and became a provincial councillor in the Western Provincial Council. In 2015, he became a Member of Parliament from Gampaha district with a vote of 81,383.

He died on 30 May 2013 at the age of 59 while receiving treatment for cardiac arrest in Singapore.

== Political career ==
While studying as a medical student at the Faculty of Medicine, University of Colombo, Jayawardena took a keen interest in politics and social work. He became an active member of the Red Cross and the Health Association at the time. While working as a Specialist Surgeon at the Colombo National Hospital, he was also the family doctor of the late President Ranasinghe Premadasa.

After 1994 Parliamentary Election, he was elected to Parliament for the first time in as a Member of Parliament from the National List of the United National Party. He held several responsible positions in the party under then leader of the United National Party, Under D. B. Wijetunga's leadership. He became the Chief Organizer of the Ja-Ela electorate in 1998 and won the Ja-Ela seat from the United National Party in the 2001 general election. During the course, he held several positions in UNP: Member of the Working Committee of the United National Party, Secretary of the United National Party on Human Rights and Additional Secretary of the United National Party, etc.

He later became the President of the National Employees Union of the United National Party and made several contributions towards trade union rights and for the rights of Members of Parliament. Meanwhile, he attended continuously in every Commonwealth and Inter-Parliamentary Sessions by advocating for the rights of the country's minorities. Under the leadership of the Prime Minister of the United National Party Ranil Wickremesinghe from 2002 to 2004, Jayawardena was appointed as the Minister of Rehabilitation, Resettlement and Refugees. Once he was invited by the United Nations High Commissioner for Refugees to deliver a speech on "Sustainable Voluntary Resettlement of Internally Displaced Persons" in Geneva.

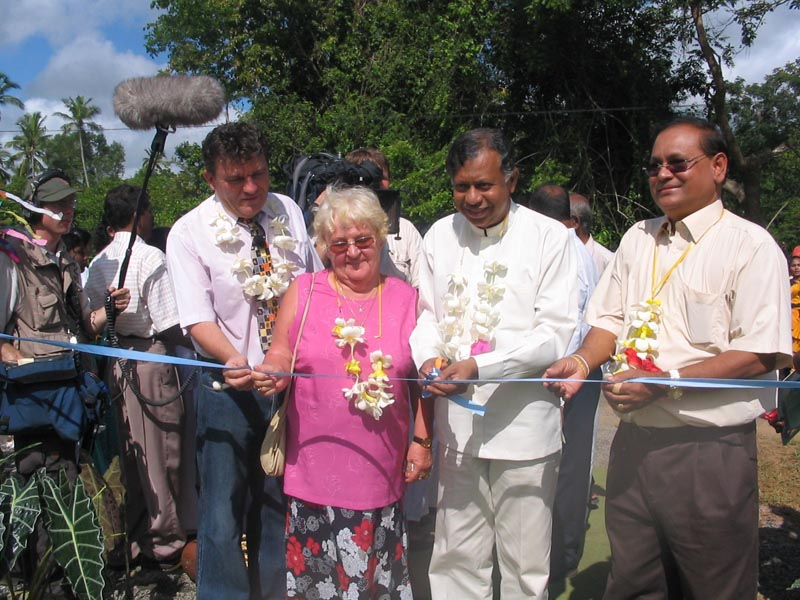
Jayawardena, third from the left, on 28 October 2005

At that time he worked tirelessly not only to build an environment in which the people of the North and East could live in peace and freedom, but also for the human rights of those people. He made several efforts to ensure the safety of the people living in the border villages of the North and East. He distributed sirens to provide security to the people of the border villages in the North and East as well as to provide security for Buddhist and Catholic shrines and Hindu temples. Apart from that, he provided sirens to the Temple of the Tooth, provided Buddhist statues to many temples and renovated some temples. As a devout catholic, he also took the initiative to erect the largest statue of St. Anne's Mother in Sri Lanka at the entrance to St. Anne's Church, Je-Ela. He was also instrumental in building the bridge of brotherhood between Catholics, Buddhists, Hindus and Muslims.

As an active social worker, Jayawardena started the 'Neth Pahan' medical program on TNL channel and worked 14 consecutive years. In 2010, the program entered the Guinness Book of Records as the medical program telecast with most consecutive years. He also presented the television programs Vaidya Hamuwa and Wedihitiyanta Pamanai. In addition to television health programs, he also volunteered to educate the public through health articles in newspapers. At the time of his death, he was a Member of Parliament for Gampaha District, Deputy General Secretary of the United National Party, President of the Jathika Sevaka Sangamaya and Chief Organizer of the United National Party for the Negombo electorate.
