= Felix Perera =

Sri Lankan politician (born 1945)

Hon. Felix Perera MP

Deputy Minister of Power & Energy
- In office 2000–2001

Minister of Transport
- In office 2004–2007

Minister of Fisheries & Aquatic Resources
- In office 2007–2010

Minister of Social Services
- In office 23 April 2010 – 12 January 2015

Member of Parliament for Gampaha District
- Incumbent
- Assumed office 1994

Personal details
- Born: 19 August 1945 (age 80)
- Party: Sri Lanka Freedom Party
- Other political affiliations: United People's Freedom Alliance

Felix Perera is a Sri Lankan politician, a member of the Parliament of Sri Lanka and a government minister.
