= Neil Rupasinghe =

Sri Lankan politician

Hon. Neil Rupasinghe MP

Deputy Minister of Labour
- In office 2000–2001

Member of Parliament for Gampaha District
- In office 1994–2004
- In office 2008–2010
- Preceded by: Reggie Ranatunga

Personal details
- Party: Sri Lanka Freedom Party
- Other political affiliations: United People's Freedom Alliance

Don Jayawickramage Neil Rupasinghe (Don Jayawickramage Neel Rupasinghe) is a Sri Lankan politician, a former member of the Parliament of Sri Lanka and a former government minister.
