= Lasantha Alagiyawanna =

Sri Lankan politician (born 1967)

Hon. Lasantha Alagiyawanna MP
- ලසන්ත අලගියවන්න லசந்த அழகியவன்ன

Deputy Minister of Transport
- In office 2004–2007

Minister of Road Passenger Transport
- In office 2007–2010

Deputy Minister of Construction, Engineering Services, Housing & Common Amenities
- In office 2010 – 12 January 2015

Member of Parliament for Gampaha District
- In office 22 April 2004 – 24 September 2024

Personal details
- Born: October 19, 1967 (age 58)
- Party: Sri Lanka Freedom Party
- Other political affiliations: People's Alliance
- Profession: Teacher

Senanayake Alagiyawanna Mohotti Appuhamillage Lasantha Alagiyawanna (born 19 October 1967), also known as Lasantha Alagiyawanna (Sinhala: ලසන්ත අලගියවන්න), is a Sri Lankan politician. He was a representative of the Gampaha District for the Sri Lanka People's Freedom Alliance in the Parliament of Sri Lanka, and served as the Minister of Road Passenger Transport.
