= Sarath Kumara Gunaratna =

Sri Lankan politician

Hon. Sarath Kumara Gunarathne MP

Member of Parliament for Gampaha District
- In office 2006–2015

Personal details
- Party: Sri Lanka Freedom Party
- Other political affiliations: United People's Freedom Alliance
- Spouse: Sujatha Gunaratne
- Website: sarathgunarathne.com

Arachchige Sarath Kumara Gunarathne is a Sri Lankan politician, a former member of the Parliament of Sri Lanka and a former government minister. He was the Negombo MP from Gampaha district from 2006 when he replaced Siripala Amarasingha until the 2015 election, when he was not re-elected. He had appointments as the Deputy Minister of Fisheries, deputy minister for state resources, and deputy minister of aviation. He became the acting minister of Fisheries and Aquatic resources following the defection of former Fisheries Minister Rajitha Senaratne to the opposition. He was arrested by the CID on charges of misappropriating Rs.12 million belonging the Negombo Fisheries Harbour Corporation on the 2nd of January 2017.

Sarath Kumara Gunaratna was born in Dungalpitiya, a village close to Negombo. His father was a local school principal. Mr Gunaratna first contested the Negombo seat in 1989, but was not able to get the required preferential votes to get elected. After a stint overseas in Italy, Mr. Gunarathne returned to Sri Lanka to enter active politics. He contested the 1999 Provincial council election representing the Wattala seat and entered the Western Provincial Council. In 2006, he entered Parliament as a 'next in line' MP when one MP resigned due to illness. He was elected in 2010 general election as an MP from the Gampaha district under the ruling UPFA coalition.

Mr Gunaratne describes his politics as progressive and people-oriented.
