= Duleep Wijesekera =

Sri Lankan politician

Hon. Duleep Wijesekera MP

Member of Parliament for Gampaha District
- In office 1 September 2015 – 3 March 2020
- In office 6 May 2008 – 9 February 2010
- Preceded by: Jeyaraj Fernandopulle

Personal details
- Born: 5 February 1966 (age 60) Papiliyawela, Sri Lanka
- Party: Sri Lanka Freedom Party
- Other political affiliations: United People's Freedom Alliance
- Spouse: Keshani Wijesekara
- Children: Easara, Dinasara, Nimsara
- Occupation: Politician

Ganepola Arachchige Duleep Pandula Perera Wijesekera (born 5 February 1966) is a Sri Lankan politician. He is a former member of the Parliament of Sri Lanka for the Gampaha District who belonged to the United People's Freedom Alliance (UPFA).

Wijesekara briefly served as the Deputy Minister of Disaster Management in the Parliament of Sri Lanka, until he was removed from this position by president Maithripala Sirisena on 29 October 2017. The next day, Wijesekara attempted to cross over to the opposition, however, the crossover was not valid since the meeting in the parliament was a committee meeting and not a regular parliament sitting day.
