= Sarana Gunawardena =

Sri Lankan politician (born 1964)

Hon. Sarana Gunawardena MP
- සරණ ගුණවර්ධන

Deputy Minister of Petroleum Industries
- In office 2010–2015

Member of Parliament for Gampaha District
- In office 5 December 2001 – 7 February 2004
- In office 25 March 2008 – 26 June 2015

Personal details
- Born: 28 April 1964 (age 62)
- Party: Sri Lanka Freedom Party
- Other political affiliations: United People's Freedom Alliance
- Criminal information
- Status: Incarcerated
- Conviction: Corruption (4 counts)
- Penalty: Four 4-year sentences (concurrent)

Details
- Date apprehended: 9 June 2026
- Imprisoned at: Welikada Prison

Bamunuarachchi Pathirannehelage Sarana Guptha Gunawardena (Sinhala: සරණ ගුණවර්ධන; born 28 April 1964) is a Sri Lankan politician, a former Member of Parliament and a deputy minister.

== Corruption charges and conviction ==
On 4 September 2017, Gunawardena was arrested by the Colombo Crimes Division (CCD) of Sri Lanka Police on charges relating to the misuse of state property during his tenure as chairman of the National Lotteries Board from 2005 to 2007.

On 6 June 2026, the Colombo High Court convicted Gunawardena on four indictments filed by the Commission to Investigate Allegations of Bribery or Corruption (CIABOC), alleging that he caused losses to the state while serving as chairman of the National Lotteries Board. He received a sentence of four years' rigorous imprisonment for each indictment, to run concurrently, and a fine of Rs. 1.8 million (approximately US$5,345).

== Arrest of wife ==
On 25 September 2026, Gunawardena's wife, Chinari Lakmanthi Hettiarachchi, was arrested by the Commission to Investigate Allegations of Bribery or Corruption (CIABOC) over an alleged attempt to influence court proceedings involving her husband. According to CIABOC, she allegedly offered a Rs. 50,000 bribe to an office assistant attached to Colombo High Court No. 11 in an attempt to secure a suspended prison sentence for Gunawardena. She was scheduled to be produced before the Colombo Chief Magistrate's Court.
