= Pandu Bandaranaike =

Sri Lankan politician

Hon. Pandu Bandaranaike

Personal details
- Born: 31 August 1962 (age 64) Sri Lanka
- Spouse: Mrkalandalage Jeewani Namal Gunawardana

Chakrawarthi Pandukabhaya Dias Bandaranaike (commonly known as Pandu Bandaranaike ) (born 31 August 1962) is a Sri Lankan politician. He was a Member of Parliament from the Gampaha Electoral District.

Born to the Bandaranaike family, his father was S. D. Bandaranayake, Member of Parliament from Gampaha from 1952 to 1989 and Dorin Dias Bandaranaike. He was educated at S. Thomas' Preparatory School and at D. S. Senanayake College. He worked as a reforestation officer in the State Timber Corporation, until he resigned in 1993 to contest the Provincial Council of the Western Province and was elected a Member of Provincial Council. In 1994, he was elected to Parliament from Gampaha. In 2009, he was appointed the Minister of Religious Affairs and later served as Deputy Minister of Indigenous Medicine.

He married Mrkalandalage Jeewani Namal Gunawardana, daughter of Air Chief Marshal Terance Gunawardana, former Commander of the Sri Lanka Air Force. They have one son Chamith Praween Dias Bandaranaike.
