= Nandana Mendis =

Sri Lankan politician

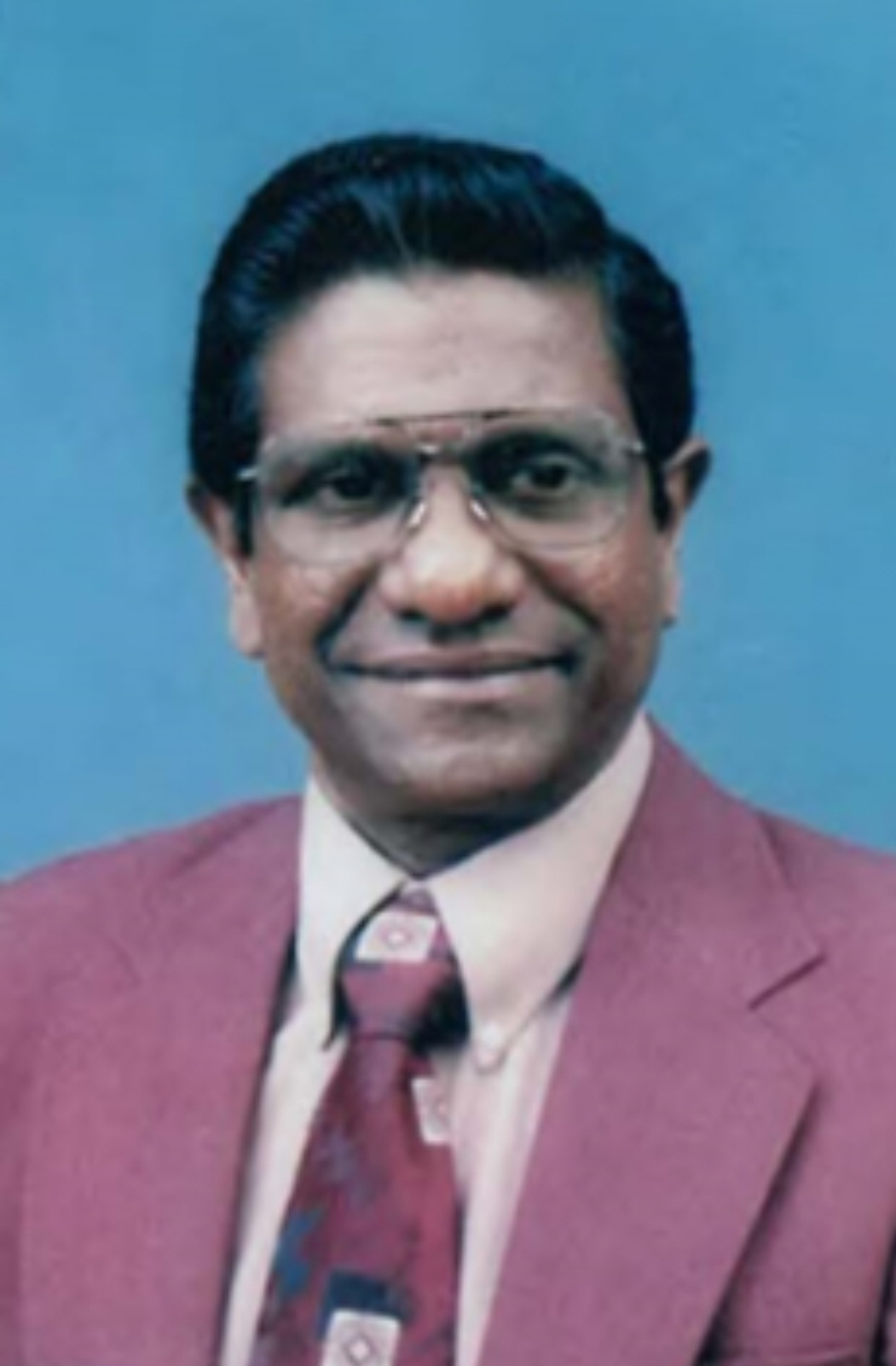
Nandana Mendis

Nandana Mendis was the Chief Minister of Western Province of Sri Lanka.
