= Sarathchandra Rajakaruna =

Sri Lankan politician (1940 - 2011)

Hon. Sarathchandra Rajakaruna MP

Member of Parliament for Gampaha District
- In office 1989–2000
- In office 2001–2010

Personal details
- Party: United National Party

Rajakaruna Mohotti Appuhamillage piyadasa Sarathchandra Rajakaruna (known as Sarath Chandra Rajakaruna; 22 July 1940 – 10 January 2011) was a Sri Lankan politician and a former member of the Parliament of Sri Lanka.
