= National Congress (Sri Lanka) =

National Congress தேசிய காங்கிரஸ் ජාතික කොංග්‍රසය
- Leader: A. L. M. Athaullah
- Secretary-General: A. L. M. Athaullah
- Founder: A. L. M. Athaullah
- Founded: February 2004; 22 years ago
- Split from: Sri Lanka Muslim Congress
- National affiliation: New Democratic Front
- Parliament: 0 / 225
- Provincial Councils: 0 / 455
- Local Government: 22 / 7,842

Election symbol
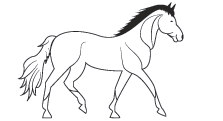
- Horse

The National Congress (Tamil: தேசிய காங்கிரஸ், romanized: Tēciya Kāṅkiras; Sinhala: ජාතික කොංග්‍රසය, romanized: Jātika Koṁgrasaya) is a registered political party in Sri Lanka. It was founded in 2004 by A. L. M. Athaullah.

== History ==
Following the death of M. H. M. Ashraff, the leader of the Sri Lanka Muslim Congress (SLMC), in September 2000 there was a power struggle between Ashraff's widow Ferial Ashraff and Rauff Hakeem for control of the party. In June 2001 Hakeem, A. L. M. Athaullah and some other SLMC MPs left the governing People's Alliance (PA). Ferial Ashraff remained in the PA as leader of the National Unity Alliance.

In October 2001 the Hakeem led SLMC joined the United National Party dominated United National Front (UNF). The UNF defeated the PA at the 2001 parliamentary election after which Hakeem was appointed a cabinet minister in the UNF government. Athaullah was only given a non-cabinet ministerial position. This caused jealousy amongst Athaullah and other SLMC members who accused Hakeem of monopolising cabinet ministerial positions for himself. Another leadership battle emerged in the SLMC, this time between Hakeem and Athaullah. In December 2002 Hakeem suspended Athaullah who was chairman of the SLMC. A legal battle ensued after which Athaullah and his supporters were expelled from the SLMC.

Athaullah and his supporters launched the Ashraff Congress political party on 25 February 2003. In February 2004 Athaullah and some others left the Ashraff Congress to form the National Muslim Congress (NMC) which became a constituent member of the newly formed UPFA, the successor to the PA.

The NMC contested the 2004 parliamentary election on the UPFA ticket, winning two seats in Parliament - Athaullah in Ampara District and M. I. Anwer Ismail on the National List. Athaullah was made a cabinet minister in the new UPFA government whilst Ismail became a deputy minister. The NMC changed its name to National Congress (NC) in September 2005. Following the death of Ismail in September 2007 the NC was reduced to a single MP. Athaullah retained his parliamentary seat and cabinet position at the 2010 parliamentary election. The NC won three seats on the Eastern Provincial Council at the 2012 provincial council election. At the 2015 presidential election, whilst other Muslim political parties flocked to support common opposition candidate Maithripala Sirisena, the NC remained loyal to President Mahinda Rajapaksa. Following Sirisena's victory, Athaullah lost his ministerial position.
