= Ampara Polling Division =

Ampara
- Polling Division
- Coordinates: 7.454697°N 81.373128°E
- Country: Sri Lanka
- Province: Eastern Province, Sri Lanka
- Electoral District: Ampara Electoral District

Area
  - Total: 1,984.68 km^{2} (766.29 sq mi)

Population (2012)
  - Total: 201,450
  - Density: 102/km^{2} (260/sq mi)
- ISO 3166 code: EC-13A

The Ampara Polling Division is a Polling Division in the Ampara Electoral District, in the Eastern Province, Sri Lanka.

== Presidential Election Results ==
=== Summary ===
The winner of Ampara has matched the final country result 7 out of 8 times. Hence, Ampara is a Strong Bellwether for Presidential Elections.

Year	Ampara	Ampara Electoral District	MAE %	Sri Lanka	MAE %
2019	SLPP	NDF	31.06%	SLPP	11.35%
2015	UPFA	NDF	26.91%	NDF	13.19%
2010	UPFA	NDF	19.33%	UPFA	9.72%
2005	UPFA	UNP	12.79%	UPFA	5.50%
1999	PA	PA	2.84%	PA	0.45%
1994	PA	PA	17.02%	PA	7.09%
1988	UNP	UNP	2.46%	UNP	1.74%
1982	UNP	UNP	3.12%	UNP	1.21%
Matches/Mean MAE	7/8	5/8	14.44%	8/8	6.28%

=== 2019 Sri Lankan Presidential Election ===
Party	Ampara		Ampara Electoral District		Sri Lanka	
Party	Votes	%	Votes	%	Votes	%
SLPP	89,674	64.69%	135,058	32.82%	6,924,255	52.25%
NDF	42,241	30.47%	259,673	63.09%	5,564,239	41.99%
NMPP	3,984	2.87%	7,460	1.81%	418,553	3.16%
Other Parties (with < 1%)	2,717	1.96%	9,379	2.28%	345,452	2.61%
Valid Votes	138,616	99.45%	411,570	99.24%	13,252,499	98.99%
Rejected Votes	772	0.55%	3,158	0.76%	135,452	1.01%
Total Polled	139,388	87.20%	414,728	82.32%	13,387,951	83.71%
Registered Electors	159,857		503,790		15,992,568	

=== 2015 Sri Lankan Presidential Election ===
Party	Ampara		Ampara Electoral District		Sri Lanka	
Party	Votes	%	Votes	%	Votes	%
UPFA	76,409	61.10%	121,027	33.82%	5,768,090	47.58%
NDF	47,658	38.11%	233,360	65.22%	6,217,162	51.28%
Other Parties (with < 1%)	997	0.80%	3,430	0.96%	138,200	1.14%
Valid Votes	125,064	99.28%	357,817	99.27%	12,123,452	98.85%
Rejected Votes	911	0.72%	2,625	0.73%	140,925	1.15%
Total Polled	125,975	77.76%	360,442	73.85%	12,264,377	78.69%
Registered Electors	161,999		488,067		15,585,942	

=== 2010 Sri Lankan Presidential Election ===
Party	Ampara		Ampara Electoral District		Sri Lanka	
Party	Votes	%	Votes	%	Votes	%
UPFA	73,389	67.94%	146,912	47.92%	6,015,934	57.88%
NDF	32,895	30.45%	153,105	49.94%	4,173,185	40.15%
Other Parties (with < 1%)	1,742	1.61%	6,545	2.13%	204,494	1.97%
Valid Votes	108,026	99.44%	306,562	99.06%	10,393,613	99.03%
Rejected Votes	608	0.56%	2,912	0.94%	101,838	0.97%
Total Polled	108,634	74.67%	309,474	36.77%	10,495,451	66.70%
Registered Electors	145,479		841,672		15,734,587	

=== 2005 Sri Lankan Presidential Election ===
Party	Ampara		Ampara Electoral District		Sri Lanka	
Party	Votes	%	Votes	%	Votes	%
UPFA	57,624	55.85%	122,329	42.88%	4,887,152	50.29%
UNP	44,218	42.86%	159,198	55.81%	4,706,366	48.43%
Other Parties (with < 1%)	1,337	1.30%	3,740	1.31%	123,521	1.27%
Valid Votes	103,179	99.09%	285,267	98.98%	9,717,039	98.88%
Rejected Votes	949	0.91%	2,941	1.02%	109,869	1.12%
Total Polled	104,128	76.15%	288,208	70.65%	9,826,908	69.51%
Registered Electors	136,738		407,918		14,136,979	

=== 1999 Sri Lankan Presidential Election ===
Party	Ampara		Ampara Electoral District		Sri Lanka	
Party	Votes	%	Votes	%	Votes	%
PA	48,385	51.78%	149,593	55.59%	4,312,157	51.12%
UNP	39,712	42.50%	109,805	40.80%	3,602,748	42.71%
JVP	3,275	3.50%	3,822	1.42%	343,927	4.08%
Other Parties (with < 1%)	2,074	2.22%	5,634	2.09%	176,679	2.09%
Valid Votes	93,446	98.38%	269,100	98.34%	8,435,754	97.69%
Rejected Votes	1,538	1.62%	4,549	1.66%	199,536	2.31%
Total Polled	94,984	78.24%	273,649	78.47%	8,635,290	72.17%
Registered Electors	121,407		348,712		11,965,536	

=== 1994 Sri Lankan Presidential Election ===
Party	Ampara		Ampara Electoral District		Sri Lanka	
Party	Votes	%	Votes	%	Votes	%
PA	44,423	55.11%	168,289	72.36%	4,709,205	62.28%
UNP	34,832	43.21%	59,074	25.40%	2,715,283	35.91%
Other Parties (with < 1%)	1,353	1.68%	5,218	2.24%	137,040	1.81%
Valid Votes	80,608	97.87%	232,581	98.47%	7,561,526	98.03%
Rejected Votes	1,751	2.13%	3,621	1.53%	151,706	1.97%
Total Polled	82,359	73.50%	236,202	74.01%	7,713,232	69.12%
Registered Electors	112,046		319,166		11,158,880	

=== 1988 Sri Lankan Presidential Election ===
Party	Ampara		Ampara Electoral District		Sri Lanka	
Party	Votes	%	Votes	%	Votes	%
UNP	34,251	50.37%	96,420	50.77%	2,569,199	50.43%
SLFP	32,915	48.40%	83,137	43.78%	2,289,857	44.95%
SLMP	839	1.23%	10,352	5.45%	235,701	4.63%
Valid Votes	68,005	98.79%	189,909	98.04%	5,094,754	98.24%
Rejected Votes	831	1.21%	3,802	1.96%	91,499	1.76%
Total Polled	68,836	73.18%	193,711	72.72%	5,186,256	55.87%
Registered Electors	94,068		266,396		9,283,143	

=== 1982 Sri Lankan Presidential Election ===
Party	Ampara		Ampara Electoral District		Sri Lanka	
Party	Votes	%	Votes	%	Votes	%
UNP	29,049	54.71%	90,772	56.39%	3,450,815	52.93%
SLFP	20,552	38.71%	53,096	32.99%	2,546,348	39.05%
JVP	3,039	5.72%	7,679	4.77%	273,428	4.19%
Other Parties (with < 1%)	459	0.86%	9,423	5.85%	249,460	3.83%
Valid Votes	53,099	99.09%	160,970	98.71%	6,520,156	98.78%
Rejected Votes	486	0.91%	2,101	1.29%	80,470	1.22%
Total Polled	53,585	82.77%	163,071	79.22%	6,600,626	80.15%
Registered Electors	64,740		205,838		8,235,358	

== Parliamentary Election Results ==
=== Summary ===
The winner of Ampara has matched the final country result 6 out of 7 times. Hence, Ampara is a Strong Bellwether for Parliamentary Elections.

Year	Ampara	Ampara Electoral District	MAE %	Sri Lanka	MAE %
2015	UPFA	UNP	11.32%	UNP	5.74%
2010	UPFA	UPFA	6.20%	UPFA	2.60%
2004	UPFA	UPFA	22.00%	UPFA	9.13%
2001	UNP	SLMC	20.69%	UNP	2.99%
2000	PA	PA	4.22%	PA	3.68%
1994	PA	UNP	22.31%	PA	2.78%
1989	UNP	UNP	24.61%	UNP	6.33%
Matches/Mean MAE	6/7	5/7	15.91%	7/7	4.75%

=== 2015 Sri Lankan Parliamentary Election ===
Party	Ampara		Ampara Electoral District		Sri Lanka	
Party	Votes	%	Votes	%	Votes	%
UPFA	60,506	52.72%	89,334	27.42%	4,732,664	42.48%
UNP	49,751	43.35%	151,013	46.34%	5,098,916	45.77%
JVP	4,029	3.51%	5,391	1.65%	544,154	4.88%
Other Parties (with < 1%)	476	0.41%	80,110	24.59%	681,497	6.12%
Valid Votes	114,762	94.25%	325,848	94.55%	11,140,333	95.35%
Rejected Votes	6,963	5.72%	18,423	5.35%	516,926	4.42%
Total Polled	121,766	75.16%	344,618	73.99%	11,684,111	77.66%
Registered Electors	161,999		465,757		15,044,490	

=== 2010 Sri Lankan Parliamentary Election ===
Party	Ampara		Ampara Electoral District		Sri Lanka	
Party	Votes	%	Votes	%	Votes	%
UPFA	51,777	61.38%	132,096	51.66%	4,846,388	60.38%
UNP	29,812	35.34%	90,757	35.50%	2,357,057	29.37%
DNA	2,188	2.59%	2,917	1.14%	441,251	5.50%
Other Parties (with < 1%)	575	0.68%	29,711	11.62%	275,183	3.43%
Valid Votes	84,352	1687040.00%	255,688	1345726.32%	8,026,322	96.03%
Rejected Votes	2	40.00%	9	47.37%	581,465	6.96%
Total Polled	5	250.00%	19	237.50%	8,358,246	59.29%
Registered Electors	2		8		14,097,690	

=== 2004 Sri Lankan Parliamentary Election ===
Party	Ampara		Ampara Electoral District		Sri Lanka	
Party	Votes	%	Votes	%	Votes	%
UPFA	55,729	61.63%	111,747	38.56%	4,223,126	45.70%
UNP	31,525	34.86%	42,121	14.53%	3,486,792	37.73%
SLMC	1,681	1.86%	76,563	26.42%	186,880	2.02%
JHU	945	1.05%	1,130	0.39%	552,723	5.98%
Other Parties (with < 1%)	545	0.60%	58,268	20.10%	720,358	7.79%
Valid Votes	90,425	92.69%	289,829	93.91%	9,241,931	94.52%
Rejected Votes	7,061	7.24%	18,264	5.92%	534,452	5.47%
Total Polled	97,561	73.70%	308,625	81.42%	9,777,821	75.74%
Registered Electors	132,371		379,044		12,909,631	

=== 2001 Sri Lankan Parliamentary Election ===
Party	Ampara		Ampara Electoral District		Sri Lanka	
Party	Votes	%	Votes	%	Votes	%
UNP	41,149	45.33%	58,468	20.87%	4,086,026	45.62%
PA	40,243	44.33%	65,246	23.29%	3,330,815	37.19%
JVP	7,994	8.81%	9,502	3.39%	815,353	9.10%
Other Parties (with < 1%)	1,390	1.53%	146,974	52.46%	659,895	7.37%
Valid Votes	90,776	92.12%	280,190	94.20%	8,955,844	94.77%
Rejected Votes	7,764	7.88%	17,225	5.79%	494,009	5.23%
Total Polled	98,544	77.80%	297,440	82.51%	9,449,878	76.03%
Registered Electors	126,660		360,497		12,428,762	

=== 2000 Sri Lankan Parliamentary Election ===
Party	Ampara		Ampara Electoral District		Sri Lanka	
Party	Votes	%	Votes	%	Votes	%
PA	44,391	49.12%	136,423	51.13%	3,899,329	45.33%
UNP	40,526	44.84%	101,628	38.09%	3,451,765	40.12%
JVP	4,627	5.12%	5,696	2.13%	518,725	6.03%
Other Parties (with < 1%)	836	0.92%	23,053	8.64%	225,112	2.62%
Valid Votes	90,380	N/A	266,800	N/A	8,602,617	N/A

=== 1994 Sri Lankan Parliamentary Election ===
Party	Ampara		Ampara Electoral District		Sri Lanka	
Party	Votes	%	Votes	%	Votes	%
PA	42,819	49.93%	54,150	22.49%	3,887,805	48.94%
UNP	42,100	49.09%	78,767	32.72%	3,498,370	44.04%
Other Parties (with < 1%)	841	0.98%	107,849	44.79%	439,019	5.53%
Valid Votes	85,760	95.08%	240,766	94.98%	7,943,688	95.20%
Rejected Votes	4,439	4.92%	12,736	5.02%	400,395	4.80%
Total Polled	90,199	80.50%	253,502	79.54%	8,344,095	74.75%
Registered Electors	112,046		318,710		11,163,064	

=== 1989 Sri Lankan Parliamentary Election ===
Party	Ampara		Ampara Electoral District		Sri Lanka	
Party	Votes	%	Votes	%	Votes	%
UNP	37,611	56.02%	62,600	29.29%	2,838,005	50.71%
SLFP	28,602	42.60%	45,400	21.24%	1,785,369	31.90%
Other Parties (with < 1%)	924	1.38%	105,714	49.47%	391,575	7.00%
Valid Votes	67,137	94.24%	213,714	95.22%	5,596,468	93.87%
Rejected Votes	4,104	5.76%	10,727	4.78%	365,563	6.13%
Total Polled	71,241	76.68%	224,441	84.45%	5,962,031	63.60%
Registered Electors	92,901		265,768		9,374,164	

== Demographics ==
=== Ethnicity ===
The Ampara Polling Division has a Sinhalese majority (99.1%). In comparison, the Ampara Electoral District (which contains the Ampara Polling Division) has a Moor plurality (43.4%), a significant Sinhalese population (38.9%) and a significant Sri Lankan Tamil population (17.3%)

Ethnicity in Ampara
1. Sinhalese (99.1%)
2. Other (0.90%)

=== Religion ===
The Ampara Polling Division has a Buddhist majority (98.8%). In comparison, the Ampara Electoral District (which contains the Ampara Polling Division) has a Muslim plurality (43.4%), a significant Buddhist population (38.7%) and a significant Hindu population (15.8%)

Religion in Ampara
1. Buddhist (98.8%)
2. Other (1.20%)
