= Thahir =

Thahir is a given name and a surname. Notable people with the name include:

== Given name ==
- M. M. Thahir (born 1974), Sri Lankan politician
- Marrikkar Mohamed Thahir, Sri Lankan politician
- Sameer Thahir (born 1976), Indian cinematographer, screenwriter, producer and film director

== Surname ==
- Alwi bin Thahir al-Haddad (1884–1962), Yemeni scholar and Islamic jurist
- Thahir Zaman (born 1995), Indian footballer
