= Kodeeswaran =

Kodeeswaran, Koteeswaran, or Kodeeshwaran may refer to:

- K. Kodeeswaran, a Sri Lankan politician
- Kodeeswaran, a Tamil-language game show once broadcast on Sun TV
- Ningalkkum Aakaam Kodeeshwaran, a former Malayalam-language game show
- Koteeswaran, a 1955 Tamil-language film
