= Sammanthurai Polling Division =

Sammanthurai
- Polling Division
- Coordinates: 7.333626°N 81.764902°E
- Country: Sri Lanka
- Province: Eastern Province, Sri Lanka
- Electoral District: Ampara Electoral District

Area
  - Total: 264.68 km^{2} (102.19 sq mi)

Population (2012)
  - Total: 132,741
  - Density: 502/km^{2} (1,300/sq mi)
- ISO 3166 code: EC-13B

The Sammanthurai Polling Division is a Polling Division in the Ampara Electoral District, in the Eastern Province, Sri Lanka.

== Presidential Election Results ==
=== Summary ===
The winner of Sammanthurai has matched the final country result 5 out of 8 times. Hence, Sammanthurai is a Weak Bellwether for Presidential Elections.

Year	Sammanthurai	Ampara Electoral District	MAE %	Sri Lanka	MAE %
2019	NDF	NDF	21.88%	SLPP	40.38%
2015	NDF	NDF	19.33%	NDF	33.03%
2010	NDF	NDF	6.12%	UPFA	15.87%
2005	UNP	UNP	2.21%	UPFA	5.09%
1999	PA	PA	7.49%	PA	10.50%
1994	PA	PA	8.76%	PA	18.93%
1988	UNP	UNP	3.67%	UNP	4.44%
1982	UNP	UNP	9.16%	UNP	13.54%
Matches/Mean MAE	5/8	5/8	9.83%	8/8	17.72%

=== 2019 Sri Lankan Presidential Election ===
Party	Sammanthurai		Ampara Electoral District		Sri Lanka	
Party	Votes	%	Votes	%	Votes	%
NDF	57,910	86.22%	259,673	63.09%	5,564,239	41.99%
SLPP	7,151	10.65%	135,058	32.82%	6,924,255	52.25%
Other Parties (with < 1%)	2,104	3.13%	16,839	4.09%	764,005	5.76%
Valid Votes	67,165	99.27%	411,570	99.24%	13,252,499	98.99%
Rejected Votes	494	0.73%	3,158	0.76%	135,452	1.01%
Total Polled	67,659	78.75%	414,728	82.32%	13,387,951	83.71%
Registered Electors	85,911		503,790		15,992,568	

=== 2015 Sri Lankan Presidential Election ===
Party	Sammanthurai		Ampara Electoral District		Sri Lanka	
Party	Votes	%	Votes	%	Votes	%
NDF	46,827	84.63%	233,360	65.22%	6,217,162	51.28%
UPFA	7,797	14.09%	121,027	33.82%	5,768,090	47.58%
Other Parties (with < 1%)	709	1.28%	3,430	0.96%	138,200	1.14%
Valid Votes	55,333	99.26%	357,817	99.27%	12,123,452	98.85%
Rejected Votes	412	0.74%	2,625	0.73%	140,925	1.15%
Total Polled	55,745	69.37%	360,442	73.85%	12,264,377	78.69%
Registered Electors	80,357		488,067		15,585,942	

=== 2010 Sri Lankan Presidential Election ===
Party	Sammanthurai		Ampara Electoral District		Sri Lanka	
Party	Votes	%	Votes	%	Votes	%
NDF	27,003	55.95%	153,105	49.94%	4,173,185	40.15%
UPFA	19,991	41.42%	146,912	47.92%	6,015,934	57.88%
Other Parties (with < 1%)	1,268	2.63%	6,545	2.13%	204,494	1.97%
Valid Votes	48,262	98.86%	306,562	99.06%	10,393,613	99.03%
Rejected Votes	556	1.14%	2,912	0.94%	101,838	0.97%
Total Polled	48,818	68.33%	309,474	36.77%	10,495,451	66.70%
Registered Electors	71,442		841,672		15,734,587	

=== 2005 Sri Lankan Presidential Election ===
Party	Sammanthurai		Ampara Electoral District		Sri Lanka	
Party	Votes	%	Votes	%	Votes	%
UNP	24,969	53.53%	159,198	55.81%	4,706,366	48.43%
UPFA	21,029	45.09%	122,329	42.88%	4,887,152	50.29%
Other Parties (with < 1%)	643	1.38%	3,740	1.31%	123,521	1.27%
Valid Votes	46,641	98.90%	285,267	98.98%	9,717,039	98.88%
Rejected Votes	517	1.10%	2,941	1.02%	109,869	1.12%
Total Polled	47,158	70.74%	288,208	70.65%	9,826,908	69.51%
Registered Electors	66,666		407,918		14,136,979	

=== 1999 Sri Lankan Presidential Election ===
Party	Sammanthurai		Ampara Electoral District		Sri Lanka	
Party	Votes	%	Votes	%	Votes	%
PA	28,822	63.83%	149,593	55.59%	4,312,157	51.12%
UNP	15,225	33.72%	109,805	40.80%	3,602,748	42.71%
Other Parties (with < 1%)	1,107	2.45%	9,456	3.51%	520,606	6.17%
Valid Votes	45,154	98.47%	269,100	98.34%	8,435,754	97.69%
Rejected Votes	701	1.53%	4,549	1.66%	199,536	2.31%
Total Polled	45,855	80.97%	273,649	78.47%	8,635,290	72.17%
Registered Electors	56,629		348,712		11,965,536	

=== 1994 Sri Lankan Presidential Election ===
Party	Sammanthurai		Ampara Electoral District		Sri Lanka	
Party	Votes	%	Votes	%	Votes	%
PA	30,890	81.11%	168,289	72.36%	4,709,205	62.28%
UNP	6,056	15.90%	59,074	25.40%	2,715,283	35.91%
Ind 2	918	2.41%	3,677	1.58%	58,888	0.78%
Other Parties (with < 1%)	218	0.57%	1,541	0.66%	78,152	1.03%
Valid Votes	38,082	98.76%	232,581	98.47%	7,561,526	98.03%
Rejected Votes	480	1.24%	3,621	1.53%	151,706	1.97%
Total Polled	38,562	74.17%	236,202	74.01%	7,713,232	69.12%
Registered Electors	51,991		319,166		11,158,880	

=== 1988 Sri Lankan Presidential Election ===
Party	Sammanthurai		Ampara Electoral District		Sri Lanka	
Party	Votes	%	Votes	%	Votes	%
UNP	17,866	53.77%	96,420	50.77%	2,569,199	50.43%
SLFP	12,983	39.07%	83,137	43.78%	2,289,857	44.95%
SLMP	2,378	7.16%	10,352	5.45%	235,701	4.63%
Valid Votes	33,227	97.49%	189,909	98.04%	5,094,754	98.24%
Rejected Votes	857	2.51%	3,802	1.96%	91,499	1.76%
Total Polled	34,084	76.10%	193,711	72.72%	5,186,256	55.87%
Registered Electors	44,790		266,396		9,283,143	

=== 1982 Sri Lankan Presidential Election ===
Party	Sammanthurai		Ampara Electoral District		Sri Lanka	
Party	Votes	%	Votes	%	Votes	%
UNP	19,079	67.00%	90,772	56.39%	3,450,815	52.93%
SLFP	6,710	23.56%	53,096	32.99%	2,546,348	39.05%
ACTC	1,214	4.26%	8,079	5.02%	173,934	2.67%
JVP	1,197	4.20%	7,679	4.77%	273,428	4.19%
Other Parties (with < 1%)	276	0.97%	1,344	0.83%	75,526	1.16%
Valid Votes	28,476	98.70%	160,970	98.71%	6,520,156	98.78%
Rejected Votes	374	1.30%	2,101	1.29%	80,470	1.22%
Total Polled	28,850	80.18%	163,071	79.22%	6,600,626	80.15%
Registered Electors	35,982		205,838		8,235,358	

== Parliamentary Election Results ==
=== Summary ===
The winner of Sammanthurai has matched the final country result 4 out of 7 times. Hence, Sammanthurai is a Weak Bellwether for Parliamentary Elections.

Year	Sammanthurai	Ampara Electoral District	MAE %	Sri Lanka	MAE %
2015	UNP	UNP	6.64%	UNP	13.96%
2010	UPFA	UPFA	11.52%	UPFA	5.25%
2004	UPFA	UPFA	5.01%	UPFA	17.43%
2001	SLMC	SLMC	12.43%	UNP	30.50%
2000	PA	PA	5.37%	PA	8.86%
1994	SLMC	UNP	15.09%	PA	32.09%
1989	SLMC	UNP	17.26%	UNP	29.82%
Matches/Mean MAE	4/7	5/7	10.47%	7/7	19.70%

=== 2015 Sri Lankan Parliamentary Election ===
Party	Sammanthurai		Ampara Electoral District		Sri Lanka	
Party	Votes	%	Votes	%	Votes	%
UNP	23,206	44.82%	151,013	46.34%	5,098,916	45.77%
ACMC	14,033	27.10%	33,102	10.16%	33,102	0.30%
ITAK	7,540	14.56%	45,421	13.94%	515,963	4.63%
UPFA	6,448	12.45%	89,334	27.42%	4,732,664	42.48%
Other Parties (with < 1%)	553	1.07%	6,978	2.14%	676,586	6.07%
Valid Votes	51,780	94.62%	325,848	94.55%	11,140,333	95.35%
Rejected Votes	2,856	5.22%	18,423	5.35%	516,926	4.42%
Total Polled	54,727	68.10%	344,618	73.99%	11,684,111	77.66%
Registered Electors	80,357		465,757		15,044,490	

=== 2010 Sri Lankan Parliamentary Election ===
Party	Sammanthurai		Ampara Electoral District		Sri Lanka	
Party	Votes	%	Votes	%	Votes	%
UPFA	28,252	65.50%	132,096	51.66%	4,846,388	60.38%
UNP	10,184	23.61%	90,757	35.50%	2,357,057	29.37%
ITAK	3,972	9.21%	26,895	10.52%	233,190	2.91%
Other Parties (with < 1%)	726	1.68%	5,891	2.30%	483,154	6.02%
Valid Votes	43,134	1078350.00%	255,688	1345726.32%	8,026,322	96.03%
Rejected Votes	2	50.00%	9	47.37%	581,465	6.96%
Total Polled	4	400.00%	19	237.50%	8,358,246	59.29%
Registered Electors	1		8		14,097,690	

=== 2004 Sri Lankan Parliamentary Election ===
Party	Sammanthurai		Ampara Electoral District		Sri Lanka	
Party	Votes	%	Votes	%	Votes	%
UPFA	19,117	39.94%	111,747	38.56%	4,223,126	45.70%
SLMC	17,688	36.96%	76,563	26.42%	186,880	2.02%
ITAK	8,976	18.75%	55,533	19.16%	633,203	6.85%
UNP	1,664	3.48%	42,121	14.53%	3,486,792	37.73%
Other Parties (with < 1%)	417	0.87%	3,865	1.33%	639,878	6.92%
Valid Votes	47,862	94.04%	289,829	93.91%	9,241,931	94.52%
Rejected Votes	2,955	5.81%	18,264	5.92%	534,452	5.47%
Total Polled	50,894	80.57%	308,625	81.42%	9,777,821	75.74%
Registered Electors	63,166		379,044		12,909,631	

=== 2001 Sri Lankan Parliamentary Election ===
Party	Sammanthurai		Ampara Electoral District		Sri Lanka	
Party	Votes	%	Votes	%	Votes	%
SLMC	21,705	46.76%	75,257	26.86%	105,346	1.18%
IND9	8,275	17.83%	14,808	5.28%	14,848	0.17%
TULF	7,801	16.81%	48,789	17.41%	348,164	3.89%
PA	5,981	12.89%	65,246	23.29%	3,330,815	37.19%
UNP	1,280	2.76%	58,468	20.87%	4,086,026	45.62%
EPDP	973	2.10%	5,901	2.11%	72,783	0.81%
Other Parties (with < 1%)	401	0.86%	11,721	4.18%	934,107	10.43%
Valid Votes	46,416	95.39%	280,190	94.20%	8,955,844	94.77%
Rejected Votes	2,238	4.60%	17,225	5.79%	494,009	5.23%
Total Polled	48,658	81.81%	297,440	82.51%	9,449,878	76.03%
Registered Electors	59,474		360,497		12,428,762	

=== 2000 Sri Lankan Parliamentary Election ===
Party	Sammanthurai		Ampara Electoral District		Sri Lanka	
Party	Votes	%	Votes	%	Votes	%
PA	25,501	57.85%	136,423	51.13%	3,899,329	45.33%
UNP	14,625	33.18%	101,628	38.09%	3,451,765	40.12%
IG2	3,144	7.13%	19,812	7.43%	31,443	0.37%
Other Parties (with < 1%)	809	1.84%	8,937	3.35%	712,394	8.28%
Valid Votes	44,079	N/A	266,800	N/A	8,602,617	N/A

=== 1994 Sri Lankan Parliamentary Election ===
Party	Sammanthurai		Ampara Electoral District		Sri Lanka	
Party	Votes	%	Votes	%	Votes	%
SLMC	21,997	57.18%	75,092	31.19%	143,307	1.80%
UNP	9,874	25.67%	78,767	32.72%	3,498,370	44.04%
TULF	4,355	11.32%	24,526	10.19%	132,461	1.67%
TELO	969	2.52%	4,192	1.74%	24,974	0.31%
PA	889	2.31%	54,150	22.49%	3,887,805	48.94%
Other Parties (with < 1%)	388	1.01%	4,039	1.68%	138,277	1.74%
Valid Votes	38,472	94.64%	240,766	94.98%	7,943,688	95.20%
Rejected Votes	2,180	5.36%	12,736	5.02%	400,395	4.80%
Total Polled	40,652	78.19%	253,502	79.54%	8,344,095	74.75%
Registered Electors	51,991		318,710		11,163,064	

=== 1989 Sri Lankan Parliamentary Election ===
Party	Sammanthurai		Ampara Electoral District		Sri Lanka	
Party	Votes	%	Votes	%	Votes	%
SLMC	23,820	60.47%	61,325	28.69%	202,016	3.61%
TULF	8,303	21.08%	43,424	20.32%	188,594	3.37%
UNP	6,163	15.64%	62,600	29.29%	2,838,005	50.71%
SLFP	971	2.46%	45,400	21.24%	1,785,369	31.90%
Other Parties (with < 1%)	136	0.35%	965	0.45%	965	0.02%
Valid Votes	39,393	96.50%	213,714	95.22%	5,596,468	93.87%
Rejected Votes	1,429	3.50%	10,727	4.78%	365,563	6.13%
Total Polled	40,822	91.83%	224,441	84.45%	5,962,031	63.60%
Registered Electors	44,453		265,768		9,374,164	

== Demographics ==
=== Ethnicity ===
The Sammanthurai Polling Division has a Moor majority (83.4%) and a significant Sri Lankan Tamil population (15.0%) . In comparison, the Ampara Electoral District (which contains the Samanthurai Polling Division) has a Moor plurality (43.4%), a significant Sinhalese population (38.9%) and a significant Sri Lankan Tamil population (17.3%)

Ethnicity in Sammanthurai
1. Moor (83.4%)
2. Sri Lankan Tamil (15.0%)
3. Sinhalese (1.30%)
4. Other (0.30%)

=== Religion ===
The Sammanthurai Polling Division has a Muslim majority (83.4%) and a significant Hindu population (13.4%) . In comparison, the Ampara Electoral District (which contains the Sammanthurai Polling Division) has a Muslim plurality (43.4%), a significant Buddhist population (38.7%) and a significant Hindu population (15.8%)

Religion in Sammanthurai
1. Muslim (83.4%)
2. Hindu (13.4%)
3. Roman Catholic (1.50%)
4. Buddhist (1.30%)
5. Other (0.40%)
