= Kalmunai Polling Division =

Kalmunai
- Polling Division
- Coordinates: 7.369741°N 81.830838°E
- Country: Sri Lanka
- Province: Eastern Province, Sri Lanka
- Electoral District: Ampara Electoral District

Area
  - Total: 53.26 km^{2} (20.56 sq mi)

Population (2012)
  - Total: 143,093
  - Density: 2,687/km^{2} (6,960/sq mi)
- ISO 3166 code: EC-13C

The Kalmunai Polling Division is a Polling Division in the Ampara Electoral District, in the Eastern Province, Sri Lanka.

== Presidential Election Results ==
=== Summary ===
The winner of Kalmunai has matched the final country result 5 out of 8 times. Hence, Kalmunai is a Weak Bellwether for Presidential Elections.

Year	Kalmunai	Ampara Electoral District	MAE %	Sri Lanka	MAE %
2019	NDF	NDF	19.19%	SLPP	37.93%
2015	NDF	NDF	24.35%	NDF	37.99%
2010	NDF	NDF	25.32%	UPFA	35.07%
2005	UNP	UNP	19.54%	UPFA	26.84%
1999	PA	PA	0.97%	PA	2.40%
1994	PA	PA	13.70%	PA	23.85%
1988	UNP	UNP	10.84%	UNP	11.67%
1982	UNP	UNP	5.98%	UNP	10.07%
Matches/Mean MAE	5/8	5/8	14.99%	8/8	23.23%

=== 2019 Sri Lankan Presidential Election ===
Party	Kalmunai		Ampara Electoral District		Sri Lanka	
Party	Votes	%	Votes	%	Votes	%
NDF	47,309	83.08%	259,673	63.09%	5,564,239	41.99%
SLPP	7,286	12.79%	135,058	32.82%	6,924,255	52.25%
Other Parties (with < 1%)	997	1.75%	7,165	1.74%	306,638	2.31%
NMPP	709	1.25%	7,460	1.81%	418,553	3.16%
IND11	644	1.13%	2,214	0.54%	38,814	0.29%
Valid Votes	56,945	99.03%	411,570	99.24%	13,252,499	98.99%
Rejected Votes	555	0.97%	3,158	0.76%	135,452	1.01%
Total Polled	57,500	77.63%	414,728	82.32%	13,387,951	83.71%
Registered Electors	74,068		503,790		15,992,568	

=== 2015 Sri Lankan Presidential Election ===
Party	Kalmunai		Ampara Electoral District		Sri Lanka	
Party	Votes	%	Votes	%	Votes	%
NDF	45,411	89.81%	233,360	65.22%	6,217,162	51.28%
UPFA	4,683	9.26%	121,027	33.82%	5,768,090	47.58%
Other Parties (with < 1%)	467	0.92%	3,430	0.96%	138,200	1.14%
Valid Votes	50,561	99.33%	357,817	99.27%	12,123,452	98.85%
Rejected Votes	342	0.67%	2,625	0.73%	140,925	1.15%
Total Polled	50,903	71.44%	360,442	73.85%	12,264,377	78.69%
Registered Electors	71,254		488,067		15,585,942	

=== 2010 Sri Lankan Presidential Election ===
Party	Kalmunai		Ampara Electoral District		Sri Lanka	
Party	Votes	%	Votes	%	Votes	%
NDF	32,946	75.76%	153,105	49.94%	4,173,185	40.15%
UPFA	9,564	21.99%	146,912	47.92%	6,015,934	57.88%
Other Parties (with < 1%)	976	2.24%	6,545	2.13%	204,494	1.97%
Valid Votes	43,486	98.76%	306,562	99.06%	10,393,613	99.03%
Rejected Votes	544	1.24%	2,912	0.94%	101,838	0.97%
Total Polled	44,030	66.58%	309,474	36.77%	10,495,451	66.70%
Registered Electors	66,135		841,672		15,734,587	

=== 2005 Sri Lankan Presidential Election ===
Party	Kalmunai		Ampara Electoral District		Sri Lanka	
Party	Votes	%	Votes	%	Votes	%
UNP	29,316	75.60%	159,198	55.81%	4,706,366	48.43%
UPFA	8,951	23.08%	122,329	42.88%	4,887,152	50.29%
Other Parties (with < 1%)	512	1.32%	3,740	1.31%	123,521	1.27%
Valid Votes	38,779	98.84%	285,267	98.98%	9,717,039	98.88%
Rejected Votes	456	1.16%	2,941	1.02%	109,869	1.12%
Total Polled	39,235	63.03%	288,208	70.65%	9,826,908	69.51%
Registered Electors	62,251		407,918		14,136,979	

=== 1999 Sri Lankan Presidential Election ===
Party	Kalmunai		Ampara Electoral District		Sri Lanka	
Party	Votes	%	Votes	%	Votes	%
PA	23,773	55.38%	149,593	55.59%	4,312,157	51.12%
UNP	18,390	42.84%	109,805	40.80%	3,602,748	42.71%
Other Parties (with < 1%)	761	1.77%	9,456	3.51%	520,606	6.17%
Valid Votes	42,924	98.38%	269,100	98.34%	8,435,754	97.69%
Rejected Votes	707	1.62%	4,549	1.66%	199,536	2.31%
Total Polled	43,631	78.77%	273,649	78.47%	8,635,290	72.17%
Registered Electors	55,387		348,712		11,965,536	

=== 1994 Sri Lankan Presidential Election ===
Party	Kalmunai		Ampara Electoral District		Sri Lanka	
Party	Votes	%	Votes	%	Votes	%
PA	31,511	86.31%	168,289	72.36%	4,709,205	62.28%
UNP	4,092	11.21%	59,074	25.40%	2,715,283	35.91%
Ind 2	701	1.92%	3,677	1.58%	58,888	0.78%
Other Parties (with < 1%)	206	0.56%	1,541	0.66%	78,152	1.03%
Valid Votes	36,510	99.05%	232,581	98.47%	7,561,526	98.03%
Rejected Votes	352	0.95%	3,621	1.53%	151,706	1.97%
Total Polled	36,862	73.36%	236,202	74.01%	7,713,232	69.12%
Registered Electors	50,248		319,166		11,158,880	

=== 1988 Sri Lankan Presidential Election ===
Party	Kalmunai		Ampara Electoral District		Sri Lanka	
Party	Votes	%	Votes	%	Votes	%
UNP	18,746	62.03%	96,420	50.77%	2,569,199	50.43%
SLFP	9,708	32.12%	83,137	43.78%	2,289,857	44.95%
SLMP	1,766	5.84%	10,352	5.45%	235,701	4.63%
Valid Votes	30,220	98.14%	189,909	98.04%	5,094,754	98.24%
Rejected Votes	573	1.86%	3,802	1.96%	91,499	1.76%
Total Polled	30,793	69.86%	193,711	72.72%	5,186,256	55.87%
Registered Electors	44,077		266,396		9,283,143	

=== 1982 Sri Lankan Presidential Election ===
Party	Kalmunai		Ampara Electoral District		Sri Lanka	
Party	Votes	%	Votes	%	Votes	%
UNP	18,347	64.15%	90,772	56.39%	3,450,815	52.93%
SLFP	8,197	28.66%	53,096	32.99%	2,546,348	39.05%
ACTC	926	3.24%	8,079	5.02%	173,934	2.67%
JVP	861	3.01%	7,679	4.77%	273,428	4.19%
Other Parties (with < 1%)	268	0.94%	1,344	0.83%	75,526	1.16%
Valid Votes	28,599	98.45%	160,970	98.71%	6,520,156	98.78%
Rejected Votes	449	1.55%	2,101	1.29%	80,470	1.22%
Total Polled	29,048	77.44%	163,071	79.22%	6,600,626	80.15%
Registered Electors	37,509		205,838		8,235,358	

== Parliamentary Election Results ==
=== Summary ===
The winner of Kalmunai has matched the final country result 2 out of 7 times.

Year	Kalmunai	Ampara Electoral District	MAE %	Sri Lanka	MAE %
2015	UNP	UNP	13.46%	UNP	22.85%
2010	UNP	UPFA	23.22%	UPFA	31.30%
2004	SLMC	UPFA	16.60%	UPFA	28.14%
2001	SLMC	SLMC	14.74%	UNP	30.12%
2000	PA	PA	5.47%	PA	8.80%
1994	SLMC	UNP	18.26%	PA	35.14%
1989	SLMC	UNP	12.83%	UNP	26.90%
Matches/Mean MAE	2/7	5/7	14.94%	7/7	26.18%

=== 2015 Sri Lankan Parliamentary Election ===
Party	Kalmunai		Ampara Electoral District		Sri Lanka	
Party	Votes	%	Votes	%	Votes	%
UNP	24,992	55.15%	151,013	46.34%	5,098,916	45.77%
ITAK	10,847	23.94%	45,421	13.94%	515,963	4.63%
ACMC	8,549	18.87%	33,102	10.16%	33,102	0.30%
UPFA	726	1.60%	89,334	27.42%	4,732,664	42.48%
Other Parties (with < 1%)	200	0.44%	6,978	2.14%	676,586	6.07%
Valid Votes	45,314	95.53%	325,848	94.55%	11,140,333	95.35%
Rejected Votes	2,051	4.32%	18,423	5.35%	516,926	4.42%
Total Polled	47,434	66.57%	344,618	73.99%	11,684,111	77.66%
Registered Electors	71,254		465,757		15,044,490	

=== 2010 Sri Lankan Parliamentary Election ===
Party	Kalmunai		Ampara Electoral District		Sri Lanka	
Party	Votes	%	Votes	%	Votes	%
UNP	20,457	55.15%	90,757	35.50%	2,357,057	29.37%
UPFA	8,332	22.46%	132,096	51.66%	4,846,388	60.38%
ITAK	7,947	21.42%	26,895	10.52%	233,190	2.91%
Other Parties (with < 1%)	360	0.97%	5,926	2.32%	485,562	6.05%
Valid Votes	37,096	1854800.00%	255,688	1345726.32%	8,026,322	96.03%
Rejected Votes	1	50.00%	9	47.37%	581,465	6.96%
Total Polled	2	200.00%	19	237.50%	8,358,246	59.29%
Registered Electors	1		8		14,097,690	

=== 2004 Sri Lankan Parliamentary Election ===
Party	Kalmunai		Ampara Electoral District		Sri Lanka	
Party	Votes	%	Votes	%	Votes	%
SLMC	21,978	47.26%	76,563	26.42%	186,880	2.02%
ITAK	13,842	29.77%	55,533	19.16%	633,203	6.85%
UPFA	9,189	19.76%	111,747	38.56%	4,223,126	45.70%
UNP	971	2.09%	42,121	14.53%	3,486,792	37.73%
Other Parties (with < 1%)	524	1.13%	3,865	1.33%	639,878	6.92%
Valid Votes	46,504	94.46%	289,829	93.91%	9,241,931	94.52%
Rejected Votes	2,506	5.09%	18,264	5.92%	534,452	5.47%
Total Polled	49,231	81.43%	308,625	81.42%	9,777,821	75.74%
Registered Electors	60,456		379,044		12,909,631	

=== 2001 Sri Lankan Parliamentary Election ===
Party	Kalmunai		Ampara Electoral District		Sri Lanka	
Party	Votes	%	Votes	%	Votes	%
SLMC	22,765	51.64%	75,257	26.86%	105,346	1.18%
TULF	11,558	26.22%	48,789	17.41%	348,164	3.89%
UNP	4,411	10.01%	58,468	20.87%	4,086,026	45.62%
PA	2,700	6.12%	65,246	23.29%	3,330,815	37.19%
EPDP	1,346	3.05%	5,901	2.11%	72,783	0.81%
IND9	1,051	2.38%	14,808	5.28%	14,848	0.17%
Other Parties (with < 1%)	251	0.57%	11,721	4.18%	934,107	10.43%
Valid Votes	44,082	95.80%	280,190	94.20%	8,955,844	94.77%
Rejected Votes	1,930	4.19%	17,225	5.79%	494,009	5.23%
Total Polled	46,016	79.82%	297,440	82.51%	9,449,878	76.03%
Registered Electors	57,653		360,497		12,428,762	

=== 2000 Sri Lankan Parliamentary Election ===
Party	Kalmunai		Ampara Electoral District		Sri Lanka	
Party	Votes	%	Votes	%	Votes	%
PA	22,459	54.88%	136,423	51.13%	3,899,329	45.33%
UNP	12,300	30.06%	101,628	38.09%	3,451,765	40.12%
IG2	5,480	13.39%	19,812	7.43%	31,443	0.37%
Other Parties (with < 1%)	684	1.67%	8,937	3.35%	712,394	8.28%
Valid Votes	40,923	N/A	266,800	N/A	8,602,617	N/A

=== 1994 Sri Lankan Parliamentary Election ===
Party	Kalmunai		Ampara Electoral District		Sri Lanka	
Party	Votes	%	Votes	%	Votes	%
SLMC	22,653	59.09%	75,092	31.19%	143,307	1.80%
UNP	7,631	19.91%	78,767	32.72%	3,498,370	44.04%
TULF	6,294	16.42%	24,526	10.19%	132,461	1.67%
TELO	789	2.06%	4,192	1.74%	24,974	0.31%
PA	584	1.52%	54,150	22.49%	3,887,805	48.94%
Other Parties (with < 1%)	384	1.00%	4,039	1.68%	138,277	1.74%
Valid Votes	38,335	96.35%	240,766	94.98%	7,943,688	95.20%
Rejected Votes	1,454	3.65%	12,736	5.02%	400,395	4.80%
Total Polled	39,789	79.19%	253,502	79.54%	8,344,095	74.75%
Registered Electors	50,248		318,710		11,163,064	

=== 1989 Sri Lankan Parliamentary Election ===
Party	Kalmunai		Ampara Electoral District		Sri Lanka	
Party	Votes	%	Votes	%	Votes	%
SLMC	15,144	42.89%	61,325	28.69%	202,016	3.61%
TULF	11,369	32.20%	43,424	20.32%	188,594	3.37%
UNP	6,513	18.44%	62,600	29.29%	2,838,005	50.71%
SLFP	2,241	6.35%	45,400	21.24%	1,785,369	31.90%
Other Parties (with < 1%)	45	0.13%	965	0.45%	965	0.02%
Valid Votes	35,312	96.15%	213,714	95.22%	5,596,468	93.87%
Rejected Votes	1,413	3.85%	10,727	4.78%	365,563	6.13%
Total Polled	36,725	84.27%	224,441	84.45%	5,962,031	63.60%
Registered Electors	43,579		265,768		9,374,164	

== Demographics ==
=== Ethnicity ===
The Kalmunai Polling Division has a Moor majority (72.8%) and a significant Sri Lankan Tamil population (26.2%) . In comparison, the Ampara Electoral District (which contains the Kalmunai Polling Division) has a Moor plurality (43.4%), a significant Sinhalese population (38.9%) and a significant Sri Lankan Tamil population (17.3%)

Ethnicity in Kalmunai
1. Moor (72.8%)
2. Sri Lankan Tamil (26.2%)
3. Other (1.00%)

=== Religion ===
The Kalmunai Polling Division has a Muslim majority (72.8%) and a significant Hindu population (24.4%) . In comparison, the Ampara Electoral District (which contains the Kalmunai Polling Division) has a Muslim plurality (43.4%), a significant Buddhist population (38.7%) and a significant Hindu population (15.8%)

Religion in Kalmunai
1. Muslim (72.8%)
2. Hindu (24.4%)
3. Roman Catholic (1.40%)
4. Other Christian (1.00%)
5. Other (0.30%)
