= Pothuvil Polling Division =

Pothuvil
- Polling Division
- Coordinates: 7.046471°N 81.754894°E
- Country: Sri Lanka
- Province: Eastern Province, Sri Lanka
- Electoral District: Ampara Electoral District

Area
  - Total: 1,682.93 km^{2} (649.78 sq mi)

Population (2012)
  - Total: 172,118
  - Density: 102/km^{2} (260/sq mi)
- ISO 3166 code: EC-13D

The Pothuvil Polling Division is a Polling Division in the Ampara Electoral District, in the Eastern Province, Sri Lanka.

== Presidential Election Results ==
=== Summary ===
The winner of Pothuvil has matched the final country result 4 out of 8 times.

Year	Pothuvil	Ampara Electoral District	MAE %	Sri Lanka	MAE %
2019	NDF	NDF	16.57%	SLPP	35.20%
2015	NDF	NDF	12.27%	NDF	25.96%
2010	NDF	NDF	10.00%	UPFA	19.77%
2005	UNP	UNP	9.86%	UPFA	17.17%
1999	PA	PA	0.46%	PA	3.11%
1994	PA	PA	8.28%	PA	18.40%
1988	SLFP	UNP	5.26%	UNP	4.58%
1982	UNP	UNP	6.17%	UNP	4.82%
Matches/Mean MAE	4/8	5/8	8.61%	8/8	16.13%

=== 2019 Sri Lankan Presidential Election ===
Party	Pothuvil		Ampara Electoral District		Sri Lanka	
Party	Votes	%	Votes	%	Votes	%
NDF	100,952	80.62%	259,673	63.09%	5,564,239	41.99%
SLPP	20,116	16.06%	135,058	32.82%	6,924,255	52.25%
Other Parties (with < 1%)	4,153	3.32%	16,839	4.09%	764,005	5.76%
Valid Votes	125,221	99.27%	411,570	99.24%	13,252,499	98.99%
Rejected Votes	925	0.73%	3,158	0.76%	135,452	1.01%
Total Polled	126,146	78.99%	414,728	82.32%	13,387,951	83.71%
Registered Electors	159,694		503,790		15,992,568	

=== 2015 Sri Lankan Presidential Election ===
Party	Pothuvil		Ampara Electoral District		Sri Lanka	
Party	Votes	%	Votes	%	Votes	%
NDF	81,547	77.55%	233,360	65.22%	6,217,162	51.28%
UPFA	22,425	21.33%	121,027	33.82%	5,768,090	47.58%
Other Parties (with < 1%)	1,176	1.12%	3,430	0.96%	138,200	1.14%
Valid Votes	105,148	99.24%	357,817	99.27%	12,123,452	98.85%
Rejected Votes	802	0.76%	2,625	0.73%	140,925	1.15%
Total Polled	105,950	69.64%	360,442	73.85%	12,264,377	78.69%
Registered Electors	152,147		488,067		15,585,942	

=== 2010 Sri Lankan Presidential Election ===
Party	Pothuvil		Ampara Electoral District		Sri Lanka	
Party	Votes	%	Votes	%	Votes	%
NDF	54,374	59.89%	153,105	49.94%	4,173,185	40.15%
UPFA	33,979	37.42%	146,912	47.92%	6,015,934	57.88%
Other Parties (with < 1%)	2,443	2.69%	6,545	2.13%	204,494	1.97%
Valid Votes	90,796	98.84%	306,562	99.06%	10,393,613	99.03%
Rejected Votes	1,066	1.16%	2,912	0.94%	101,838	0.97%
Total Polled	91,862	66.67%	309,474	36.77%	10,495,451	66.70%
Registered Electors	137,779		841,672		15,734,587	

=== 2005 Sri Lankan Presidential Election ===
Party	Pothuvil		Ampara Electoral District		Sri Lanka	
Party	Votes	%	Votes	%	Votes	%
UNP	55,467	65.75%	159,198	55.81%	4,706,366	48.43%
UPFA	27,704	32.84%	122,329	42.88%	4,887,152	50.29%
Other Parties (with < 1%)	1,188	1.41%	3,740	1.31%	123,521	1.27%
Valid Votes	84,359	98.99%	285,267	98.98%	9,717,039	98.88%
Rejected Votes	863	1.01%	2,941	1.02%	109,869	1.12%
Total Polled	85,222	65.66%	288,208	70.65%	9,826,908	69.51%
Registered Electors	129,798		407,918		14,136,979	

=== 1999 Sri Lankan Presidential Election ===
Party	Pothuvil		Ampara Electoral District		Sri Lanka	
Party	Votes	%	Votes	%	Votes	%
PA	46,341	55.89%	149,593	55.59%	4,312,157	51.12%
UNP	34,407	41.50%	109,805	40.80%	3,602,748	42.71%
Other Parties (with < 1%)	2,168	2.61%	9,456	3.51%	520,606	6.17%
Valid Votes	82,916	98.39%	269,100	98.34%	8,435,754	97.69%
Rejected Votes	1,360	1.61%	4,549	1.66%	199,536	2.31%
Total Polled	84,276	76.35%	273,649	78.47%	8,635,290	72.17%
Registered Electors	110,386		348,712		11,965,536	

=== 1994 Sri Lankan Presidential Election ===
Party	Pothuvil		Ampara Electoral District		Sri Lanka	
Party	Votes	%	Votes	%	Votes	%
PA	56,780	80.76%	168,289	72.36%	4,709,205	62.28%
UNP	11,774	16.75%	59,074	25.40%	2,715,283	35.91%
Ind 2	1,407	2.00%	3,677	1.58%	58,888	0.78%
Other Parties (with < 1%)	349	0.50%	1,541	0.66%	78,152	1.03%
Valid Votes	70,310	98.67%	232,581	98.47%	7,561,526	98.03%
Rejected Votes	949	1.33%	3,621	1.53%	151,706	1.97%
Total Polled	71,259	72.92%	236,202	74.01%	7,713,232	69.12%
Registered Electors	97,721		319,166		11,158,880	

=== 1988 Sri Lankan Presidential Election ===
Party	Pothuvil		Ampara Electoral District		Sri Lanka	
Party	Votes	%	Votes	%	Votes	%
SLFP	27,239	47.09%	83,137	43.78%	2,289,857	44.95%
UNP	25,262	43.67%	96,420	50.77%	2,569,199	50.43%
SLMP	5,345	9.24%	10,352	5.45%	235,701	4.63%
Valid Votes	57,846	97.43%	189,909	98.04%	5,094,754	98.24%
Rejected Votes	1,524	2.57%	3,802	1.96%	91,499	1.76%
Total Polled	59,370	71.67%	193,711	72.72%	5,186,256	55.87%
Registered Electors	82,833		266,396		9,283,143	

=== 1982 Sri Lankan Presidential Election ===
Party	Pothuvil		Ampara Electoral District		Sri Lanka	
Party	Votes	%	Votes	%	Votes	%
UNP	23,286	47.29%	90,772	56.39%	3,450,815	52.93%
SLFP	17,265	35.06%	53,096	32.99%	2,546,348	39.05%
ACTC	5,748	11.67%	8,079	5.02%	173,934	2.67%
JVP	2,518	5.11%	7,679	4.77%	273,428	4.19%
Other Parties (with < 1%)	423	0.86%	1,344	0.83%	75,526	1.16%
Valid Votes	49,240	98.44%	160,970	98.71%	6,520,156	98.78%
Rejected Votes	778	1.56%	2,101	1.29%	80,470	1.22%
Total Polled	50,018	75.74%	163,071	79.22%	6,600,626	80.15%
Registered Electors	66,037		205,838		8,235,358	

== Parliamentary Election Results ==
=== Summary ===
The winner of Pothuvil has matched the final country result 3 out of 7 times.

Year	Pothuvil	Ampara Electoral District	MAE %	Sri Lanka	MAE %
2015	UNP	UNP	4.97%	UNP	12.41%
2010	UPFA	UPFA	5.47%	UPFA	13.13%
2004	SLMC	UPFA	12.28%	UPFA	25.03%
2001	SLMC	SLMC	8.02%	UNP	26.46%
2000	PA	PA	2.32%	PA	2.83%
1994	SLMC	UNP	9.39%	PA	28.69%
1989	TULF	UNP	7.66%	UNP	23.58%
Matches/Mean MAE	3/7	5/7	7.16%	7/7	18.88%

=== 2015 Sri Lankan Parliamentary Election ===
Party	Pothuvil		Ampara Electoral District		Sri Lanka	
Party	Votes	%	Votes	%	Votes	%
UNP	43,533	45.96%	151,013	46.34%	5,098,916	45.77%
ITAK	25,147	26.55%	45,421	13.94%	515,963	4.63%
UPFA	15,575	16.44%	89,334	27.42%	4,732,664	42.48%
ACMC	9,517	10.05%	33,102	10.16%	33,102	0.30%
Other Parties (with < 1%)	943	1.00%	6,978	2.14%	676,586	6.07%
Valid Votes	94,715	94.07%	325,848	94.55%	11,140,333	95.35%
Rejected Votes	5,837	5.80%	18,423	5.35%	516,926	4.42%
Total Polled	100,686	66.18%	344,618	73.99%	11,684,111	77.66%
Registered Electors	152,147		465,757		15,044,490	

=== 2010 Sri Lankan Parliamentary Election ===
Party	Pothuvil		Ampara Electoral District		Sri Lanka	
Party	Votes	%	Votes	%	Votes	%
UPFA	32,603	43.09%	132,096	51.66%	4,846,388	60.38%
UNP	27,189	35.93%	90,757	35.50%	2,357,057	29.37%
ITAK	14,248	18.83%	26,895	10.52%	233,190	2.91%
TMVP	934	1.23%	1,490	0.58%	20,284	0.25%
Other Parties (with < 1%)	695	0.92%	4,442	1.74%	477,444	5.95%
Valid Votes	75,669	945862.50%	255,688	1345726.32%	8,026,322	96.03%
Rejected Votes	4	50.00%	9	47.37%	581,465	6.96%
Total Polled	8	200.00%	19	237.50%	8,358,246	59.29%
Registered Electors	4		8		14,097,690	

=== 2004 Sri Lankan Parliamentary Election ===
Party	Pothuvil		Ampara Electoral District		Sri Lanka	
Party	Votes	%	Votes	%	Votes	%
SLMC	33,787	35.58%	76,563	26.42%	186,880	2.02%
ITAK	31,890	33.59%	55,533	19.16%	633,203	6.85%
UPFA	22,192	23.37%	111,747	38.56%	4,223,126	45.70%
UNP	5,723	6.03%	42,121	14.53%	3,486,792	37.73%
Other Parties (with < 1%)	1,358	1.43%	3,865	1.33%	639,878	6.92%
Valid Votes	94,950	94.64%	289,829	93.91%	9,241,931	94.52%
Rejected Votes	5,227	5.21%	18,264	5.92%	534,452	5.47%
Total Polled	100,332	81.54%	308,625	81.42%	9,777,821	75.74%
Registered Electors	123,051		379,044		12,909,631	

=== 2001 Sri Lankan Parliamentary Election ===
Party	Pothuvil		Ampara Electoral District		Sri Lanka	
Party	Votes	%	Votes	%	Votes	%
SLMC	29,047	31.85%	75,257	26.86%	105,346	1.18%
TULF	28,882	31.67%	48,789	17.41%	348,164	3.89%
PA	13,861	15.20%	65,246	23.29%	3,330,815	37.19%
UNP	9,515	10.43%	58,468	20.87%	4,086,026	45.62%
IND9	5,062	5.55%	14,808	5.28%	14,848	0.17%
EPDP	3,377	3.70%	5,901	2.11%	72,783	0.81%
Other Parties (with < 1%)	1,462	1.60%	11,721	4.18%	934,107	10.43%
Valid Votes	91,206	94.85%	280,190	94.20%	8,955,844	94.77%
Rejected Votes	4,940	5.14%	17,225	5.79%	494,009	5.23%
Total Polled	96,159	82.39%	297,440	82.51%	9,449,878	76.03%
Registered Electors	116,710		360,497		12,428,762	

=== 2000 Sri Lankan Parliamentary Election ===
Party	Pothuvil		Ampara Electoral District		Sri Lanka	
Party	Votes	%	Votes	%	Votes	%
PA	39,753	48.12%	136,423	51.13%	3,899,329	45.33%
UNP	30,750	37.22%	101,628	38.09%	3,451,765	40.12%
IG2	10,729	12.99%	19,812	7.43%	31,443	0.37%
Other Parties (with < 1%)	1,381	1.67%	8,937	3.35%	712,394	8.28%
Valid Votes	82,613	N/A	266,800	N/A	8,602,617	N/A

=== 1994 Sri Lankan Parliamentary Election ===
Party	Pothuvil		Ampara Electoral District		Sri Lanka	
Party	Votes	%	Votes	%	Votes	%
SLMC	28,851	40.17%	75,092	31.19%	143,307	1.80%
UNP	16,717	23.28%	78,767	32.72%	3,498,370	44.04%
TULF	13,532	18.84%	24,526	10.19%	132,461	1.67%
PA	7,959	11.08%	54,150	22.49%	3,887,805	48.94%
IND1	2,420	3.37%	3,366	1.40%	48,199	0.61%
TELO	2,235	3.11%	4,192	1.74%	24,974	0.31%
Other Parties (with < 1%)	108	0.15%	673	0.28%	90,078	1.13%
Valid Votes	71,822	94.06%	240,766	94.98%	7,943,688	95.20%
Rejected Votes	4,536	5.94%	12,736	5.02%	400,395	4.80%
Total Polled	76,358	78.14%	253,502	79.54%	8,344,095	74.75%
Registered Electors	97,721		318,710		11,163,064	

=== 1989 Sri Lankan Parliamentary Election ===
Party	Pothuvil		Ampara Electoral District		Sri Lanka	
Party	Votes	%	Votes	%	Votes	%
TULF	23,352	33.54%	43,424	20.32%	188,594	3.37%
SLMC	21,631	31.07%	61,325	28.69%	202,016	3.61%
SLFP	13,012	18.69%	45,400	21.24%	1,785,369	31.90%
UNP	11,475	16.48%	62,600	29.29%	2,838,005	50.71%
Other Parties (with < 1%)	157	0.23%	965	0.45%	965	0.02%
Valid Votes	69,627	95.17%	213,714	95.22%	5,596,468	93.87%
Rejected Votes	3,533	4.83%	10,727	4.78%	365,563	6.13%
Total Polled	73,160	88.97%	224,441	84.45%	5,962,031	63.60%
Registered Electors	82,231		265,768		9,374,164	

== Demographics ==
=== Ethnicity ===
The Pothuvil Polling Division has a Moor plurality (38.4%), a significant Sri Lankan Tamil population (31.8%) and a significant Sinhalese population (29.4%) . In comparison, the Ampara Electoral District (which contains the Pothuvil Polling Division) has a Moor plurality (43.4%), a significant Sinhalese population (38.9%) and a significant Sri Lankan Tamil population (17.3%)

Ethnicity in Pothuvil
1. Moor (38.4%)
2. Sri Lankan Tamil (31.8%)
3. Sinhalese (29.4%)
4. Other (0.40%)

=== Religion ===
The Pothuvil Polling Division has a Muslim plurality (38.4%), a significant Buddhist population (29.2%) and a significant Hindu population (29.0%) . In comparison, the Ampara Electoral District (which contains the Pothuvil Polling Division) has a Muslim plurality (43.4%), a significant Buddhist population (38.7%) and a significant Hindu population (15.8%)

Religion in Pothuvil
1. Muslim (38.4%)
2. Buddhist (29.2%)
3. Hindu (29.0%)
4. Other Christian (1.70%)
5. Roman Catholic (1.60%)
6. Other (0.00%)
