= U. L. M. Mohideen =

Sri Lankan politician

Hon. U. L. M. Mohideen MP

Member of Parliament for Ampara District
- In office 1994–2001

Personal details
- Born: 28 February 1939
- Party: Sri Lanka Muslim Congress
- Other political affiliations: People's Alliance
- Education: Ceylon Law College
- Profession: Lawyer

Uduma Lebbe Mohamed Mohideen (born 28 February 1939; also known as Thoppi Mohideen) was a Sri Lankan lawyer, politician, Member of Parliament and deputy minister.

== Early life and family ==
Mohideen was born on 28 February 1939. He was educated at Zahira College and Alexandra College. He later studied at Ceylon Law College and qualified as a lawyer.

== Career ==
Mohideen joined the Sri Lanka Freedom Party (SLFP) in its early days. He was a member of the local authority in Sammanthurai.

Mohideen was one of the Sri Lanka Muslim Congress' (SLMC) candidates in Ampara District at the 1989 parliamentary election but failed to get elected after coming 3rd amongst the SLMC candidates. He contested the 1994 parliamentary election as one of the SLMC's candidates in Ampara District. He was elected and entered Parliament. He was appointed Deputy Minister of Social Services in August 2000. He contested the 2000 parliamentary election as one of the People's Alliance's (PA) candidates in Ampara District and was re-elected.

Following the death of M. H. M. Ashraff, the leader of the SLMC, in September 2000 there was a power struggle between Ashraff's widow Ferial Ashraff and Rauff Hakeem for control of the party. In June 2001 Hakeem and some other SLMC MPs left the governing PA. Mohideen however remained with the PA government. In October 2001 the Hakeem led SLMC joined the United National Party dominated United National Front (UNF). Mohideen contested the 2001 parliamentary election as PA candidate in Ampara District but failed to get re-elected.

== Electoral history ==
Electoral history of U. L. M. Mohideen
Election	Constituency	Party	Alliance	Votes	Result
1989 parliamentary	Ampara District	SLMC		22,758	Not elected
1994 parliamentary	Ampara District	SLMC		26,194	Elected
2000 parliamentary	Ampara District	SLMC	PA	75,378	Elected
2001 parliamentary	Ampara District	SLMC	PA		Not elected
