= Ampara Electoral District =

Electoral district of Sri Lanka

Ampara Electoral District அம்பாறை தேர்தல் மாவட்டம்
- Electoral District for the Parliament of Sri Lanka
- Administrative District: Ampara
- Province: Eastern
- Polling divisions: 4
- Population: 634,000 (2009)
- Electorate: 436,148 (2010)
- Area: 4,415 km^{2} (1,705 sq mi)

Current Electoral District
- Number of members: 7
- MPs: NPP (4) Wasantha Piyathissa; Manjula Ratnayake; Priyantha Wijeratne; Muthumenike Rathwatte SLMC (1) Meerasahibu Uthumalebbe ACMC (1) M. M. Thahir ITAK (1) K. Kodeeswaran

Ampara (Digamadulla) Electoral District (Tamil: அம்பாறை தேர்தல் மாவட்டம், romanized: Ampāṟai Tērtal Māvaṭṭam; Sinhala: අම්පාර මැතිවරණ දිස්ත්‍රික්කය, romanized: Ampāra Mætivaraṇa Distrikkaya) is one of the 22 multi-member electoral districts of Sri Lanka created by the 1978 Constitution of Sri Lanka. The district is conterminous with the administrative district of Ampara in the Eastern province. The district currently elects 7 of the 225 members of the Sri Lankan Parliament and had 436,148 registered electors in 2010. The district is Sri Lanka's Electorate Number 13.

== Polling Divisions ==
The Ampara Electoral District consists of the following polling divisions:

A: Ampara

B: Sammanthurai

C: Kalmunai

D: Pothuvil

== Election results ==
=== 1982 presidential election ===
Results of the 1st presidential election held on 20 October 1982 for the district:

Candidate	Party	Votes per Polling Division				Postal Votes	Total Votes	%
Candidate	Party	Ampara	Kal- munai	Pottu -vil	Saman- thurai	Postal Votes	Total Votes	%
J. R. Jayewardene	UNP	29,049	18,347	23,286	19,079	1,011	90,772	56.39%
Hector Kobbekaduwa	SLFP	20,552	8,197	17,265	6,710	372	53,096	32.99%
Kumar Ponnambalam	ACTC	96	926	5,748	1,214	95	8,079	5.02%
Rohana Wijeweera	JVP	3,039	861	2,518	1,197	64	7,679	4.77%
Colvin de Silva	LSSP	278	153	304	221	11	967	0.60%
Vasudeva Nanayakkara	NSSP	85	115	119	55	3	377	0.23%
Valid Votes		53,099	28,599	49,240	28,476	1,556	160,970	100.00%
Rejected Votes		486	449	778	374	14	2,101	
Total Polled		53,585	29,048	50,018	28,850	1,570	163,071	
Registered Electors		64,740	37,509	66,037	35,982		204,268	
Turnout (%)		82.77%	77.44%	75.74%	80.18%		79.83%	

=== 1988 provincial council election ===
Results of the 1st North Eastern provincial council election held on 19 November 1988:

Party	Votes per Polling Division				Total Votes	%	Seats
Party	Ampara	Kal- munai	Pottu -vil	Saman- thurai	Total Votes	%	Seats
Sri Lanka Muslim Congress	40	26,441	34,972	28,983	90,436	63.03%	9
Eelam People's Revolutionary Liberation Front	20	12,626	25,140	7,968	45,754	31.89%	4
United National Party	5,338	111	1,704	147	7,300	5.09%	1
Valid Votes	5,398	39,178	61,816	37,098	143,490	100.00%	14
Rejected Votes	219	460	932	1,020	2,631		
Total Polled	5,617	39,638	62,748	38,118	146,121		
Registered Electors	94,068	44,075	82,833	44,975	265,951		
Turnout (%)	5.97%	89.93%	75.75%	84.75%	54.94%		

=== 1988 presidential election ===
Results of the 2nd presidential election held on 19 December 1988:

Candidate	Party	Votes per Polling Division				Postal Votes	Total Votes	%
Candidate	Party	Ampara	Kal- munai	Pottu -vil	Saman- thurai	Postal Votes	Total Votes	%
Ranasinghe Premadasa	UNP	34,251	18,746	25,262	17,866	295	96,420	50.77%
Sirimavo Bandaranaike	SLFP	32,915	9,708	27,239	12,983	292	83,137	43.78%
Oswin Abeygunasekara	SLPP	839	1,766	5,345	2,378	24	10,352	5.45%
Valid Votes		68,005	30,220	57,846	33,227	611	189,909	100.00%
Rejected Votes		831	573	1,524	857	17	3,802	
Total Polled		68,836	30,793	59,370	34,084	628	193,711	
Registered Electors		94,068	44,077	82,833	44,790		265,768	
Turnout (%)		73.18%	69.86%	71.67%	76.10%		72.89%	

=== 1989 parliamentary general election ===
Results of the 9th parliamentary election held on 15 February 1989:

Party	Votes per Polling Division				Postal Votes	Total Votes	%	Seats
Party	Ampara	Kal- munai	Pottu -vil	Saman- thurai	Postal Votes	Total Votes	%	Seats
United National Party (CWC, UNP)	37,611	6,513	11,475	6,163	838	62,600	29.29%	3
Sri Lanka Muslim Congress	190	15,144	21,631	23,820	540	61,325	28.69%	1
Sri Lanka Freedom Party	28,602	2,241	13,012	971	574	45,400	21.24%	1
Tamil United Liberation Front (ENDLF, EPRLF, TELO, TULF)	124	11,369	23,352	8,303	276	43,424	20.32%	1
United Socialist Alliance (CPSL, LSSP, NSSP, SLPP)	610	45	157	136	17	965	0.45%	0
Valid Votes	67,137	35,312	69,627	39,393	2,245	213,714	100.00%	6
Rejected Votes	4,104	1,413	3,533	1,429	248	10,727		
Total Polled	71,241	36,725	73,160	40,822	2,493	224,441		
Registered Electors	92,901	43,579	82,231	44,453	2,604	265,768		
Turnout	76.68%	84.27%	88.97%	91.83%	95.74%	84.45%		

The following candidates were elected: M. H. M. Ashraff (SLMC), 56,464 preference votes (pv); P. Dayaratna (UNP), 37,996 pv; Ahangama Polwatte Galappaththige Chandradasa (UNP), 28,075 pv; Nihal Yasendra Bakmeewewa (UNP), 24,752 pv; Thewarapperuma Arachchilage Karunasinghe Thewarapperuma (SLFP), 21,751 pv; and J. Thiviyanathan (EPRLF), 17,880 pv.

=== 1994 parliamentary general election ===
Results of the 10th parliamentary election held on 16 August 1994:

Party	Votes per Polling Division				Postal Votes	Total Votes	%	Seats
Party	Ampara	Kal- munai	Pottu -vil	Saman- thurai	Postal Votes	Total Votes	%	Seats
United National Party (CWC, UNP)	42,100	7,631	16,717	9,874	2,445	78,767	32.72%	3
Sri Lanka Muslim Congress	72	22,653	28,851	21,997	1,519	75,092	31.19%	2
People's Alliance (SLFP et al.)	42,819	584	7,959	889	1,899	54,150	22.49%	1
Tamil United Liberation Front	65	6,294	13,532	4,355	280	24,526	10.19%	0
Tamil Eelam Liberation Organization (EROS, PLOTE, TELO)	151	789	2,235	969	48	4,192	1.74%	0
Independent Group	88	358	2,420	344	156	3,366	1.40%	0
Sri Lanka Progressive Front (JVP)	465	26	108	44	30	673	0.28%	0
Valid Votes	85,760	38,335	71,822	38,472	6,377	240,766	100.00%	6
Rejected Votes	4,439	1,454	4,536	2,180	127	12,736		
Total Polled	90,199	39,789	76,358	40,652	6,504	253,502		
Registered Electors	112,046	50,248	97,721	51,991		312,006		
Turnout	80.50%	79.19%	78.14%	78.19%		81.25%		

The following candidates were elected: M. H. M. Ashraff (SLMC), 69,076 preference votes (pv); P. Dayaratna (UNP), 45,411 pv; Ahangama Polwatte Galappaththige Chandradasa (UNP), 40,675 pv; Herath Mudiyanselage Weerasinghe (PA), 36,276 pv; Nihal Yasendra Bakmeewewa (UNP), 29,061 pv; and U. L. M. Mohideen (SLMC), 26,194 pv.

=== 1994 presidential election ===
Results of the 3rd presidential election held on 9 November 1994:

Candidate	Party	Votes per Polling Division				Postal Votes	Total Votes	%
Candidate	Party	Ampara	Kal- munai	Pottu -vil	Saman- thurai	Postal Votes	Total Votes	%
Chandrika Kumaratunga	PA	44,423	31,511	56,780	30,890	4,685	168,289	72.36%
Srimathi Dissanayake	UNP	34,832	4,092	11,774	6,056	2,320	59,074	25.40%
Hudson Samarasinghe	Ind 2	640	701	1,407	918	11	3,677	1.58%
G. A. Nihal	SLPF	246	78	147	79	24	574	0.25%
A. J. Ranashinge	Ind 1	231	70	88	89	18	496	0.21%
Harischandra Wijayatunga	SMBP	236	58	114	50	13	471	0.20%
Valid Votes		80,608	36,510	70,310	38,082	7,071	232,581	100.00%
Rejected Votes		1,751	352	949	480	89	3,621	
Total Polled		82,359	36,862	71,259	38,562	7,160	236,202	
Registered Electors		112,046	50,248	97,721	51,991	7,648	312,006	
Turnout (%)		73.50%	73.36%	72.92%	74.17%	93.62%	75.70%	

=== 1999 presidential election ===
Results of the 4th presidential election held on 21 December 1999:

Candidate	Party	Votes per Polling Division				Postal Votes	Total Votes	%
Candidate	Party	Ampara	Kal- munai	Pottu -vil	Saman- thurai	Postal Votes	Total Votes	%
Chandrika Kumaratunga	PA	48,385	23,773	46,341	28,822	2,272	149,593	55.59%
Ranil Wickremasinghe	UNP	39,712	18,390	34,407	15,225	2,071	109,805	40.80%
Nandana Gunathilake	JVP	3,275	34	427	86	0	4,068	1.51%
W. V. M. Ranjith	Ind 2	497	149	437	191	1	1,275	0.47%
Rajiva Wijesinha	Liberal	496	136	339	219	3	1,193	0.44%
T. Edirisuriya	Ind 1	364	112	231	115	1	823	0.31%
Abdul Rasool	SLMP	94	129	284	137	19	663	0.25%
Kamal Karunadasa	PLSF	172	65	162	120	0	519	0.19%
Vasudeva Nanayakkara	LDA	93	79	116	152	33	473	0.18%
Harischandra Wijayatunga	SMBP	206	18	76	34	10	344	0.13%
Hudson Samarasinghe	Ind 3	79	22	34	34	2	171	0.06%
A. Dissanayaka	DUNF	36	7	40	8	2	93	0.03%
A. W. Premawardhana	PFF	37	10	22	11	0	80	0.03%
Valid Votes		93,446	42,924	82,916	45,154	4,660	269,100	100.00%
Rejected Votes		1,538	707	1,360	701	243	4,549	
Total Polled		94,984	43,631	84,276	45,855	4,903	273,649	
Registered Electors		121,407	55,387	110,386	56,629		343,809	
Turnout (%)		78.24%	78.77%	76.35%	80.97%		79.59%	

=== 2000 parliamentary general election ===
Results of the 11th parliamentary election held on 10 October 2000:

Party	Votes per Polling Division				Postal Votes	Total Votes	%	Seats
Party	Ampara	Kal- munai	Pottu -vil	Saman- thurai	Postal Votes	Total Votes	%	Seats
People's Alliance (SLFP, SLMC et al.)	44,391	22,459	39,753	25,501	4,319	136,423	51.13%	4
United National Party (DWC, NWC, UCPF, UNP)	40,526	12,300	30,750	14,625	3,427	101,628	38.09%	2
Independent 2 (Eelam People's Democratic Party)	12	5,480	10,729	3,144	447	19,812	7.43%	1
Janatha Vimukthi Peramuna	4,627	31	444	79	515	5,696	2.13%	0
Independent Group 5	23	408	297	408	26	1,079	0.40%	0
Citizen's Front	234	29	172	75	17	527	0.20%	0
Independent Group 3	12	148	120	79	16	375	0.14%	0
Liberal Party	119	62	72	56	4	313	0.12%	0
Independent Group 1	30	41	140	29	0	240	0.09%	0
Sinhala Heritage	184	4	25	4	21	238	0.09%	0
People's Freedom Front	73	19	36	20	2	150	0.06%	0
Independent Group 6	44	5	36	25	2	112	0.04%	0
Sri Lanka Muslim Party	22	8	12	15	6	63	0.02%	0
Sinhalaye Mahasammatha Bhoomiputra Pakshaya	32	6	3	5	2	48	0.02%	0
Independent Group 4	19	4	8	6	0	37	0.01%	0
Sri Lanka Progressive Front	17	2	8	5	1	33	0.01%	0
Ruhuna People's Party	15	0	8	3	0	26	0.01%	0
Valid Votes	90,380	40,923	82,613	44,079	8,805	266,800	100.00%	7
Rejected Votes	5,944	1,954	5,443	2,850		16,521		
Total Polled	96,324	42,877	88,056	46,929		283,321		
Registered Electors	124,405	56,513	113,519	58,100		352,537		
Turnout (%)	77.43%	75.87%	77.57%	80.77%		80.37%		

The following candidates were elected: Ferial Ismail Ashraff (PA-SLMC), 83,353 preference votes (pv); A. L. M. Athaullah (PA-SLMC), 75,647 pv; U. L. M. Mohideen (PA-SLMC), 75,378 pv; P. Dayaratna (UNP), 47,421 pv; Ahangama Polwatte Galappaththige Chandradasa (UNP), 41,420 pv; Wimal Dissanayaka (PA-SLMC), 27,677 pv; and Markandu Gunasekeram (EPDP), 12,799 pv.

=== 2001 parliamentary general election ===
Results of the 12th parliamentary election held on 5 December 2001:

Party	Votes per Polling Division				Postal Votes	Displaced Votes	Total Votes	%	Seats
Party	Ampara	Kal- munai	Pottu -vil	Saman- thurai	Postal Votes	Displaced Votes	Total Votes	%	Seats
Sri Lanka Muslim Congress	222	22,765	29,047	21,705	1,518	0	75,257	26.86%	3
People's Alliance (NUA, SLFP et al.)	40,243	2,700	13,861	5,981	2,461	0	65,246	23.28%	2
United National Front (CWC, UNP, WPF)	41,149	4,411	9,515	1,280	2,113	0	58,468	20.87%	1
Tamil National Alliance (ACTC, EPRLF(S), TELO, TULF)	13	11,558	28,882	7,801	534	1	48,789	17.41%	1
Independent Group 9	40	1,051	5,062	8,275	380	0	14,808	5.28%	0
Janatha Vimukthi Peramuna	7,994	13	802	56	637	0	9,502	3.39%	0
Eelam People's Democratic Party	156	1,346	3,377	973	49	0	5,901	2.11%	0
New Left Front (NSSP et al.)	663	69	317	107	9	0	1,165	0.42%	0
Sinhala Heritage	97	24	55	51	2	0	229	0.08%	0
Sri Lanka Muslim Party	3	52	56	48	1	0	160	0.06%	0
National Development Front	26	11	46	11	1	0	95	0.03%	0
Independent Group 14	6	32	33	22	0	0	93	0.03%	0
Ruhuna People's Party	63	1	15	5	2	0	86	0.03%	0
Sri Lanka Progressive Front	13	16	38	15	0	0	82	0.03%	0
Independent Group 8	5	2	22	31	0	0	60	0.02%	0
Sinhalaye Mahasammatha Bhoomiputra Pakshaya	22	4	8	4	1	0	39	0.01%	0
Independent Group 10	3	1	18	13	0	0	35	0.01%	0
Independent Group 15	16	3	9	7	0	0	35	0.01%	0
Independent Group 1	9	3	6	12	0	0	30	0.01%	0
Independent Group 4	4	4	13	4	0	0	25	0.01%	0
Independent Group 7	6	1	8	5	0	0	20	0.01%	0
Independent Group 3	5	5	6	3	0	0	19	0.01%	0
Independent Group 5	9	2	5	2	1	0	19	0.01%	0
Independent Group 2	3	5	4	4	0	0	16	0.01%	0
Independent Group 12	3	2	5	3	0	0	13	0.00%	0
Independent Group 11	2	3	4	1	0	0	10	0.00%	0
Independent Group 13	3	2	2	0	0	0	7	0.00%	0
Independent Group 6	2	0	3	1	0	0	6	0.00%	0
Valid Votes	90,780	40,048	91,219	46,420	7,709	1	280,215	100.00%	7
Rejected Votes	7,764	1,930	4,940	2,238	353	0	17,225		
Total Polled	98,544	46,016	96,159	48,658	8,062	1	297,440		
Registered Electors	126,660	57,653	116,710	59,474			360,497		
Turnout (%)	77.805	79.82%	82.39%	81.81%			82.51%		

The following candidates were elected: P. Dayaratna (UNF), 42,301 preference votes (pv); A. L. M. Athaullah (SLMC), 35,523 pv; H. M. M. Harees (SLMC), 34,798 pv; Ferial Ismail Ashraff (PA), 28,802 pv; Thewarapperuma Arachchilage Karunasinghe Thewarapperuma (PA), 26,361 pv; A. Chandranehru (TNA-TULF), 26,282) pv; and Anwer Ismail Mohomed Ismail (SLMC), 23,718 pv.

=== 2004 parliamentary general election ===
Results of the 13th parliamentary election held on 2 April 2004:

Party	Votes per Polling Division				Postal Votes	Total Votes	%	Seats
Party	Ampara	Kal- munai	Pottu -vil	Saman- thurai	Postal Votes	Total Votes	%	Seats
United People's Freedom Alliance (JVP, NUA, SLFP et al.)	55,729	9,189	22,192	19,117	5,520	111,747	38.49%	3
Sri Lanka Muslim Congress	1,681	21,978	33,787	17,688	1,429	76,563	26.37%	2
Tamil National Alliance (ACTC, EPRLF(S), ITAK, TELO)	62	13,842	31,890	8,976	763	55,533	19.13%	1
United National Front (CWC, DPF, UNP)	31,525	971	5,723	1,664	2,238	42,121	14.51%	1
Eelam People's Democratic Party	232	252	923	178	26	1,611	0.55%	0
Jathika Hela Urumaya	945	2	81	1	101	1,130	0.39%	0
United Muslim People's Alliance	66	84	71	109	5	335	0.12%	0
Sri Lanka Progressive Front	17	65	122	66	2	272	0.09%	0
Independent Group 2	0	94	18	32	2	146	0.05%	0
United Socialist Party	49	4	45	4	2	104	0.04%	0
Sinhalaye Mahasammatha Bhoomiputra Pakshaya	7	16	41	21	0	85	0.03%	0
Independent Group 26	12	16	34	11	1	74	0.03%	0
National Development Front	33	6	18	8	1	66	0.02%	0
Independent Group 11	1	51	4	4	0	60	0.02%	0
Independent Group 27	17	8	24	7	0	56	0.02%	0
Independent Group 3	3	45	5	2	0	55	0.02%	0
New Left Front (NSSP et al.)	28	4	8	10	0	50	0.02%	0
Independent Group 1	4	10	27	7	0	48	0.02%	0
United Lalith Front	30	5	7	3	1	46	0.02%	0
Independent Group 5	7	15	11	7	0	40	0.01%	0
Independent Group 8	3	19	3	1	0	26	0.01%	0
Independent Group 25	19	0	3	4	0	26	0.01%	0
Independent Group 6	2	2	13	3	0	20	0.01%	0
Independent Group 10	2	15	1	0	0	18	0.01%	0
Independent Group 13	2	11	3	0	0	16	0.01%	0
Independent Group 24	4	3	4	3	0	14	0.00%	0
Independent Group 14	0	2	7	2	1	12	0.00%	0
Independent Group 15	1	0	8	2	0	11	0.00%	0
Independent Group 7	4	0	4	2	0	10	0.00%	0
Independent Group 20	2	2	3	2	0	9	0.00%	0
Independent Group 19	3	0	5	0	0	8	0.00%	0
Independent Group 22	2	3	3	0	0	8	0.00%	0
Independent Group 16	2	1	3	0	0	6	0.00%	0
Independent Group 17	1	1	3	0	0	5	0.00%	0
Independent Group 21	2	0	3	0	0	5	0.00%	0
Independent Group 23	0	3	1	1	0	5	0.00%	0
Ruhuna People's Party	2	1	1	1	0	5	0.00%	0
Independent Group 4	0	2	1	1	0	4	0.00%	0
Independent Group 9	0	2	2	0	0	4	0.00%	0
Independent Group 12	0	1	2	1	0	4	0.00%	0
Independent Group 18	1	0	1	1	0	3	0.00%	0
Valid Votes	90,500	46,725	95,105	47,939	10,092	290,361	100.00%	7
Rejected Votes	7,061	2,506	5,227	2,955	515	18,264		
Total Polled	97,561	49,231	100,332	50,894	10,607	308,625		
Registered Electors	132,371	60,456	123,051	63,166		379,044		
Turnout (%)	73.70%	81.43%	81.54%	80.57%		81.42%		

The following candidates were elected: Rauff Hakeem (SLMC), 68,627 preference votes (pv); Ferial Ismail Ashraff (UPFA-NUA), 52,223 pv; L.G. Wasantha Piyatissa (UPFA-SLFP), 45,975 pv; A. L. M. Athaullah (UPFA-NC), 39,773 pv; P. Dayaratna (UNF-UNP), 31,215 pv; Kanagasabai Pathmanathan (TNA), 29,002 pv; and Cassim Faizal (SLMC), 20,724 pv.

Rauff Hakeem (SLMC) resigned on 2 April 2008 to contest the Eastern provincial council elections. His replacement A. M. M. Naoshad (SLMC) was sworn in on 9 April 2008.

Kanagasabai Pathmanathan (TNA) died on 21 May 2009. His replacement Thomas Thangathurai William (TNA) was sworn in on 12 June 2009.

=== 2005 presidential election ===
Results of the 5th presidential election held on 17 November 2005:

Candidate	Party	Votes per Polling Division				Postal Votes	Total Votes	%
Candidate	Party	Ampara	Kal- munai	Pottu -vil	Saman- thurai	Postal Votes	Total Votes	%
Ranil Wickremasinghe	UNP	44,218	29,316	55,467	24,969	5,228	159,198	55.81%
Mahinda Rajapaksa	UPFA	57,624	8,951	27,704	21,029	7,021	122,329	42.88%
Siritunga Jayasuriya	USP	275	175	419	220	2	1,091	0.38%
A. A. Suraweera	NDF	418	125	314	201	14	1,072	0.38%
Victor Hettigoda	ULPP	131	68	76	34	22	331	0.12%
Aruna de Soyza	RPP	127	19	93	54	4	297	0.10%
A. K. J. Arachchige	DUA	55	33	68	57	2	215	0.08%
Anura De Silva	ULF	58	43	73	26	3	203	0.07%
Chamil Jayaneththi	NLF	86	15	55	21	11	188	0.07%
Wimal Geeganage	SLNF	89	9	29	7	0	134	0.05%
P. Nelson Perera	SLPF	45	9	27	7	1	89	0.03%
Wije Dias	SEP	37	13	18	13	1	82	0.03%
H. S. Dharmadwaja	UNAF	16	3	16	3	0	38	0.01%
Valid Votes		103,179	38,779	84,359	46,641	12,309	285,267	100.00%
Rejected Votes		949	456	863	517	156	2,941	
Total Polled		104,128	39,235	85,222	47,158	12,465	288,208	
Registered Electors		136,738	62,251	129,798	66,666		396,453	
Turnout (%)		76.15%	62.03%	65.66%	70.74%		72.70%	

=== 2008 provincial council election ===
Results of the 1st Eastern provincial council election held on 10 May 2008:

Party	Votes per Polling Division				Postal Votes	Total Votes	%	Seats
Party	Ampara	Kal- munai	Pottu -vil	Saman- thurai	Postal Votes	Total Votes	%	Seats
United People's Freedom Alliance (SLFP, TMVP et al.)	47,319	13,468	54,619	24,119	4,722	144,247	52.96%	8
United National Party (SLMC, UNP)	31,386	27,596	37,488	21,401	3,401	121,272	44.52%	6
Janatha Vimukthi Peramuna	3,693	30	490	179	353	4,745	1.74%	0
United National Alliance	71	174	270	75	7	597	0.22%	0
New Sinhala Heritage	215	10	52	8	27	312	0.11%	0
United Socialist Party	55	69	98	69	5	296	0.11%	0
Independent Group 22	8	5	16	253	12	294	0.11%	0
Independent Group 1	3	28	71	1	3	106	0.04%	0
National Development Front	50	10	31	7	2	100	0.04%	0
People's Front of Liberation Tigers	8	15	27	8	5	63	0.02%	0
Independent Group 9	4	11	32	13	2	62	0.02%	0
Independent Group 2	3	33	6	1	2	45	0.02%	0
Independent Group 15	2	2	16	24	0	44	0.02%	0
Independent Group 6	1	14	7	4	1	27	0.01%	0
Independent Group 3	3	14	3	0	0	20	0.01%	0
Independent Group 7	3	2	10	1	1	17	0.01%	0
Independent Group 21	4	2	2	7	0	15	0.01%	0
Independent Group 13	7	2	3	1	1	14	0.01%	0
Independent Group 19	2	8	2	0	0	12	0.00%	0
Sinhalaye Mahasammatha Bhoomiputra Pakshaya	2	1	6	2	0	11	0.00%	0
Independent Group 4	1	7	0	2	0	10	0.00%	0
Independent Group 5	1	5	3	1	0	10	0.00%	0
Ruhuna People's Party	4	1	1	2	1	9	0.00%	0
Independent Group 18	3	2	4	0	0	9	0.00%	0
Independent Group 20	4	3	0	2	0	9	0.00%	0
Independent Group 8	5	1	0	1	1	8	0.00%	0
Independent Group 16	2	2	4	0	0	8	0.00%	0
Independent Group 17	1	2	3	2	0	8	0.00%	0
Independent Group 12	2	3	0	2	0	7	0.00%	0
Independent Group 14	3	1	0	0	1	5	0.00%	0
Independent Group 10	1	1	1	1	0	4	0.00%	0
Independent Group 11	2	0	0	1	0	3	0.00%	0
Liberal Party	1	0	1	0	1	3	0.00%	0
Valid Votes	82,869	41,522	93,266	46,187	8,548	272,392	100.00%	14
Rejected Votes	7,854	2,832	6,344	3,326	641	20,997		
Total Polled	90,723	44,354	99,610	49,513	9,189	293,389		
Registered Electors	142,170	64,310	133,765	69,051	0	409,308		
Turnout	63.81%	68.97%	74.47%	71.70%		71.68%		

The following candidates were elected: Ahangama Polwaththe Galappaththige Chandradasa (UNP); Daya Gamage (UNP); Ahamed Mohomad Jameel (UNP); A. Ameer Mahumud Lebbe (UPFA); Abdul Majeed (UNP); Apthurrazaak Kulanthai Marikkar (UNP); Thuraiyappa Nawarathnaraja (UPFA); Meera Labbe Thulkar Nayim (UPFA); Somasundaram Pushparaja (UPFA); Seeniththamby Selvaraja (UPFA); Hasen Ali (UNP-SLMC); Thewarapperuma Arachchilage Karunasingha Thewarapperuma (UPFA); Meera Sahibu Udumalebbe (UPFA); and Dissanayaka Wimalaweera (UPFA).

=== 2010 presidential election ===
Results of the 6th presidential election held on 26 January 2010:

Candidate	Party	Votes per Polling Division				Postal Votes	Displaced Votes	Total Votes	%
Candidate	Party	Ampara	Kal- munai	Pottu -vil	Saman- thurai	Postal Votes	Displaced Votes	Total Votes	%
Sarath Fonseka	NDF	32,895	32,946	54,374	27,003	5,885	2	153,105	49.94%
Mahinda Rajapaksa	UPFA	73,389	9,564	33,979	19,991	9,989	0	146,912	47.92%
M. C. M. Ismail	DUNF	256	181	579	236	18	0	1,270	0.41%
C. J. Sugathsiri Gamage	UDF	80	284	430	300	7	0	1,101	0.36%
W. V. Mahiman Ranjith	Ind 1	367	27	175	105	9	0	683	0.22%
A. A. Suraweera	NDF	291	39	188	110	13	0	641	0.21%
Lal Perera	ONF	108	81	173	84	1	0	447	0.15%
A. S. P Liyanage	SLLP	137	62	130	71	4	0	404	0.13%
M. K. Shivajilingam	Ind 5	40	45	214	59	11	0	369	0.12%
Sarath Manamendra	NSH	74	39	131	58	6	0	308	0.10%
Ukkubanda Wijekoon	Ind 3	93	28	69	46	4	0	240	0.08%
Siritunga Jayasuriya	USP	65	41	64	49	4	0	223	0.07%
M. Mohamed Musthaffa	Ind 4	22	39	44	11	23	0	139	0.05%
Aithurus M. Illias	Ind 2	44	19	42	29	1	0	135	0.04%
Vikramabahu Karunaratne	LF	21	26	43	18	7	0	115	0.04%
Sanath Pinnaduwa	NA	32	10	35	17	0	0	94	0.03%
Wije Dias	SEP	26	7	33	17	1	0	84	0.03%
Senaratna de Silva	PNF	19	8	29	14	1	0	71	0.02%
Battaramulla Seelarathana	JP	23	15	15	14	3	0	70	0.02%
Aruna de Soyza	RPP	20	8	19	9	2	0	58	0.02%
M. B. Thaminimulla	ACAKO	13	11	13	10	1	0	48	0.02%
Sarath Kongahage	UNAF	11	6	17	11	0	0	45	0.01%
Valid Votes		108,026	43,486	90,796	48,262	15,990	2	306,562	100.00%
Rejected Votes		608	544	1,066	556	138	0	2,912	
Total Polled		108,634	44,030	91,862	48,818	16,128	2	309,474	
Registered Electors		145,479	66,135	137,779	71,442			420,835	
Turnout		74.67%	66.58%	66.67%	68.33%			73.54%	

=== 2010 parliamentary general election ===
Results of the 14th parliamentary election held on 8 April 2010:

Party	Votes per Polling Division				Postal Votes	Displaced Votes	Total Votes	%	Seats
Party	Ampara	Kal- munai	Pottu -vil	Saman- thurai	Postal Votes	Displaced Votes	Total Votes	%	Seats
United People's Freedom Alliance (ACMC, NC, SLFP et al.)	51,777	8,332	32,603	28,252	11,132	0	132,096	51.41%	4
United National Front (DPF, SLFP(P), SLMC, UNP)	29,812	20,457	27,189	10,184	3,115	0	90,757	35.32%	2
Tamil National Alliance (EPRLF(S), ITAK, TELO)	14	7,947	14,248	3,972	713	1	26,895	10.47%	1
Democratic National Alliance (JVP et al.)	2,188	23	183	131	392	0	2,917	1.14%	0
Tamil Makkal Viduthalai Pulikal	8	184	934	344	20	0	1,490	0.58%	0
Eelavar Democratic Front (EROS)	140	22	134	83	12	0	391	0.15%	0
Independent Group 33	4	98	33	44	5	0	184	0.07%	0
Independent Group 30	68	7	56	18	11	0	160	0.06%	0
Independent Group 6	1	43	72	21	2	0	139	0.05%	0
Independent Group 19	0	23	50	46	3	0	122	0.05%	0
Independent Group 31	60	8	38	12	2	0	120	0.05%	0
Independent Group 8	62	5	29	7	4	0	107	0.04%	0
Independent Group 40	91	2	5	2	4	0	104	0.04%	0
Independent Group 32	27	14	33	13	3	0	90	0.04%	0
Independent Group 22	3	56	14	5	0	0	78	0.03%	0
Independent Group 28	3	16	39	20	0	0	78	0.03%	0
Independent Group 9	49	7	14	5	1	0	76	0.03%	0
National Development Front	21	4	30	17	4	0	76	0.03%	0
United National Alternative Front	24	10	33	5	3	0	75	0.03%	0
Independent Group 27	33	6	19	9	5	0	72	0.03%	0
Independent Group 47	3	8	40	15	0	0	66	0.03%	0
Sri Lanka National Front	6	3	5	41	1	0	56	0.02%	0
Independent Group 25	2	0	39	2	2	0	45	0.02%	0
United Democratic Front	9	13	16	5	2	0	45	0.02%	0
Independent Group 43	16	3	14	7	1	0	41	0.02%	0
Independent Group 11	12	7	2	19	0	0	40	0.02%	0
Independent Group 48	15	5	13	5	2	0	40	0.02%	0
Muslim Liberation Front	2	6	23	4	3	0	38	0.01%	0
Independent Group 2	10	3	11	13	0	0	37	0.01%	0
Independent Group 46	12	6	13	6	0	0	37	0.01%	0
Independent Group 44	10	4	11	6	1	0	32	0.01%	0
Independent Group 42	3	1	18	7	2	0	31	0.01%	0
Independent Group 45	11	1	13	1	3	0	29	0.01%	0
Independent Group 37	4	3	12	8	0	0	27	0.01%	0
Independent Group 15	5	4	12	3	2	0	26	0.01%	0
Independent Group 4	11	2	10	1	2	0	26	0.01%	0
Independent Group 5	12	1	8	1	2	0	24	0.01%	0
Our National Front	5	5	8	3	2	0	23	0.01%	0
Independent Group 38	6	4	4	4	2	0	20	0.01%	0
Independent Group 10	4	1	6	1	7	0	19	0.01%	0
Independent Group 34	1	0	9	6	0	0	16	0.01%	0
Sri Lanka Labour Party	0	3	8	2	2	0	15	0.01%	0
Independent Group 1	7	0	1	5	1	0	14	0.01%	0
Independent Group 3	3	2	3	5	0	0	13	0.01%	0
Left Liberation Front (LLF, TNLA)	1	3	9	0	0	0	13	0.01%	0
Independent Group 21	5	1	4	1	1	0	12	0.00%	0
Independent Group 39	0	1	7	3	0	0	11	0.00%	0
United Lanka Great Council	4	1	3	2	0	0	10	0.00%	0
Independent Group 35	5	0	4	1	0	0	10	0.00%	0
Sinhalaye Mahasammatha Bhoomiputra Pakshaya	2	1	5	1	1	0	10	0.00%	0
Independent Group 12	3	1	2	1	2	0	9	0.00%	0
Independent Group 13	1	1	5	1	1	0	9	0.00%	0
Independent Group 29	4	1	2	2	0	0	9	0.00%	0
Independent Group 41	3	2	2	2	0	0	9	0.00%	0
Independent Group 36	1	2	4	0	0	0	7	0.00%	0
Janasetha Peramuna	1	0	5	0	1	0	7	0.00%	0
Independent Group 16	3	1	2	0	0	0	6	0.00%	0
Independent Group 17	1	1	1	3	0	0	6	0.00%	0
Independent Group 18	1	2	1	1	0	0	5	0.00%	0
Independent Group 7	4	0	1	0	0	0	5	0.00%	0
Independent Group 14	1	0	2	1	0	0	4	0.00%	0
Independent Group 20	1	0	2	1	0	0	4	0.00%	0
Independent Group 23	2	1	0	1	0	0	4	0.00%	0
Independent Group 24	0	1	0	2	0	0	3	0.00%	0
Independent Group 26	1	0	0	2	0	0	3	0.00%	0
Ruhuna People's Party	1	0	0	2	0	0	3	0.00%	0
Valid Votes	84,599	37,369	76,116	43,387	15,474	1	256,946	100.00%	7
Rejected Votes	6,338	1,766	4,408	2,149	855	0	15,516		
Total Polled	90,937	39,135	80,524	45,536	16,329	1	272,462		
Registered Electors	145,479	66,135	137,779	71,442			420,835		
Turnout	62.51%	59.17%	58.44%	63.74%			64.74%		

The following candidates were elected: Sarath Weerasekara (UPFA), 54,373 preference votes (pv); H. M. M. Harees (UNF-SLMC), 44,755; Cassim Faizal (UNF-SLMC), 41,852 pv; A. L. M. Athaullah (UPFA-NC), 36,943 pv; Shriyani Wijewickreme (UPFA), 33,810 pv; P. Dayaratna (UPFA), 32,915 pv; and Podiappuhamy Piyasena (TNA), 11,139 pv.

=== 2012 provincial council election ===
Results of the 2nd Eastern provincial council election held on 8 September 2012:

Party	Votes per Polling Division				Postal Votes	Total Votes	%	Seats
Party	Ampara	Kal- munai	Pottu -vil	Saman- thurai	Postal Votes	Total Votes	%	Seats
United People's Freedom Alliance (ACMC, NC, SLFP, TMVP et al.)	46,409	5,990	22,179	12,610	5,342	92,530	33.66%	5
Sri Lanka Muslim Congress	1,490	22,884	31,952	25,611	1,721	83,658	30.43%	4
United National Party	35,578	1,134	6,684	1,174	3,458	48,028	17.47%	3
Tamil National Alliance (EPRLF (S), ITAK, PLOTE, TELO, TULF)	33	11,702	23,385	8,767	862	44,749	16.28%	2
Janatha Vimukthi Peramuna	1,861	1	170	70	203	2,305	0.84%	0
Socialist Alliance (CPSL, DLF, LSSP)	1,235	51	78	76	49	1,489	0.54%	0
Eelavar Democratic Front (EROS)	151	34	262	76	8	531	0.19%	0
Independent Group 10	5	213	127	28	26	399	0.15%	0
Independent Group 5	263	3	97	3	16	382	0.14%	0
Sri Lanka Labour Party	6	26	39	37	3	111	0.04%	0
United Socialist Party	61	5	24	8	5	103	0.04%	0
All Lanka Tamil United Front	9	26	27	14	0	76	0.03%	0
United Lanka People's Party	58	3	5	2	6	74	0.03%	0
Independent Group 6	52	2	5	1	9	69	0.03%	0
Independent Group 1	5	12	24	9	2	52	0.02%	0
Independent Group 14	13	2	26	9	2	52	0.02%	0
Muslim Liberation Front	7	1	16	16	2	42	0.02%	0
Independent Group 18	10	3	14	6	2	35	0.01%	0
Jana Setha Peramuna	16	0	13	2	0	31	0.01%	0
Independent Group 9	13	0	16	2	0	31	0.01%	0
Independent Group 17	7	3	8	10	2	30	0.01%	0
Independent Group 11	14	3	3	4	3	27	0.01%	0
Independent Group 12	6	1	7	4	1	19	0.01%	0
Independent Group 16	8	2	0	5	0	15	0.01%	0
Ruhuna People's Party	5	0	2	4	2	13	0.00%	0
Independent Group 13	6	0	7	0	0	13	0.00%	0
Independent Group 7	3	1	3	3	2	12	0.00%	0
United Lanka Great Council	9	0	0	0	1	10	0.00%	0
Independent Group 8	2	0	5	3	0	10	0.00%	0
Independent Group 4	2	0	5	2	0	9	0.00%	0
Independent Group 3	0	1	3	2	2	8	0.00%	0
Independent Group 15	4	0	3	0	1	8	0.00%	0
Patriotic National Front	1	0	4	1	1	7	0.00%	0
Independent Group 2	2	1	3	1	0	7	0.00%	0
Valid Votes	87,344	42,104	85,196	48,560	11,731	274,935	100.00%	14
Rejected Votes	6,302	1,975	5,341	2,551	575	16,744		
Total Polled	93,646	44,079	90,537	51,111	12,306	291,679		
Registered Electors	153,079	68,239	144,329	75,640	12,912	454,199		
Turnout	61.17%	64.60%	62.73%	67.57%	95.31%	64.22%		

The following candidates were elected: Daya Gamage (UNP), 41,064 preference votes (pv); Aadam Lebbe Thavam (SLMC), 32,330 pv; Dissanayake Wimalaweera (UPFA), 31,815 pv; Meera Saibu Uduma Lebbe (UPFA-NC), 24,033 pv; A. Ahamed Mohamed Jameel (SLMC), 22,357 pv; Ibrahim Mohamed Mohamed Mansoor (SLMC), 21,759 pv; D. Weerasingha (UPFA), 20,922 pv; Ahangama Polwaththe Galappaththige Chandradasa (UNP), 20,459 pv; Ariff Samsudeen (UPFA-NC), 19,680 pv; A. Ameer Mahmood Lebbe (UPFA-NC), 19,671 pv; Ahamed Lebbe Mohamed Nazeer (SLMC), 18,327 pv; Abesundara Wikkramasooriya Boosabaduge Nishanth Manjula Fernando (UNP), 14,887 pv; Thawaraja Kaleiarasan (TNA), 12,122 pv; and Murugesu Rajeswaran (TNA), 10,812 pv.
