= M. H. Cegu Isadean =

Sri Lankan politician

Hon. M. H. Cegu Isadean MP

Deputy Minister of Information & Media
- In office 2004 – 2007

Non-Cabinet Minister of Export Development
- In office 2007 – 2010

Member of Parliament for National List
- In office 2001 – 2010

Personal details
- Born: 12 May 1944 (age 82)
- Party: National Unity Alliance

Mohamed Hasan Cegu Isadean (born 12 May 1944) is a Sri Lankan former politician who served as a member of the Parliament of Sri Lanka and government minister. He is the founder and chairman of Sri Lanka Muslim Congress and immensely contributed to the development of the party during that time, and is also believed to be the author of the party's constitution.

He served as the opposition leader of the merged North-Eastern provincial council as well and held many deputy ministerial and ministerial portfolios such as Export Development, Mass Media Information, Rural Economic Development and Highways.

Isadean died on 28 November 2024 at the age of 81.
