= J. Thiviyanathan =

Sri Lankan Tamil politician

Hon. J. Thiviyanathan MP

Member of Parliament for Ampara District
- In office 1989–1994

Personal details
- Born: 20 April 1952 (age 73)
- Party: Eelam People's Revolutionary Liberation Front
- Ethnicity: Sri Lankan Tamil

Jeyaratnam Thiviyanathan (born 20 April 1952) is a Sri Lankan Tamil politician and former Member of Parliament.

Thiviyanathan was born on 20 April 1952. He was educated at Jaffna Central College. He is a Roman Catholic.

Thiviyanathan contested the 1989 parliamentary election as one of the Eelam People's Revolutionary Liberation Front's candidates in Ampara District and was elected to Parliament.
