= D. Weerasingha =

Sri Lankan politician (born 1979)

Hon. D. Weerasingha MP
- ඩී. වීරසිංහ டி. வீரசிங்க

Member of the Parliament of Sri Lanka
- Incumbent
- Assumed office 2020
- Constituency: Ampara District

Member of the Eastern Provincial Council
- In office 2012–2017
- Constituency: Ampara District

Personal details
- Born: W. D. Weerasingha; 15 April 1979 (age 46)
- Party: Sri Lanka Podujana Peramuna
- Other political affiliations: Sri Lanka People's Freedom Alliance

W. D. Weerasingha (born 15 April 1979) is a Sri Lankan politician, former provincial councillor and Member of Parliament.

He contested the 2012 provincial council election as one of the United People's Freedom Alliance (UPFA) electoral alliance's candidates in Ampara District and was elected to the Eastern Provincial Council (EPC). He resigned from the Sri Lanka Freedom Party in September 2017 to support former President Mahinda Rajapaksa.

In January 2020 Weerasingha and Wimalaweera Dissanayake were accused of leading a mob that attacked Mahajana Eksath Peramuna member Rushan Milinda. Weerasingha contested the 2020 parliamentary election as a Sri Lanka People's Freedom Alliance (SLPFA) electoral alliance candidate in Ampara District and was elected to the Parliament of Sri Lanka.

Electoral history of D. Weerasingha
| Election | Constituency | Party | Alliance | Votes | Result |
|---|---|---|---|---|---|
| 2012 provincial | Ampara District | Sri Lanka Freedom Party | United People's Freedom Alliance | 20,922 | Elected |
| 2020 parliamentary | Ampara District | Sri Lanka Podujana Peramuna | Sri Lanka People's Freedom Alliance | 56,006 | Elected |
