= Manjula Ratnayake =

Sri Lankan politician

Hon. Manjula Ratnayake මංජුල රත්නායක MP

Member of Parliament for Ampara District
- Incumbent
- Assumed office 21 November 2024
- Majority: 50,838 preferential votes

Member of Parliament for Ampara District

Personal details
- Party: Janatha Vimukthi Peramuna
- Other political affiliations: National People's Power
- Occupation: teacher

Manjula Ratnayake is a Sri Lankan politician and a member of the National People's Power. He was elected to the parliament in the 2024 Sri Lankan parliamentary election representing Ampara Electoral District. He is a teacher by profession and engaged in education sector trade union.

== Electoral history ==
Electoral history of Manjula Ratnayake
Election	Constituency	Party	Alliance	Votes	Result	Ref.
2024 parliamentary	Ampara District	JVP	NPP	50,838	Elected	
