= H. M. M. Harees =

Sri Lankan politician

Hon. H. M. M. Harees MP
- ஹபீப் முஹம்மட் முஹம்மட் ஹரீஸ் හබීබ් මුහම්මද් මුහම්මද් හාරිස්
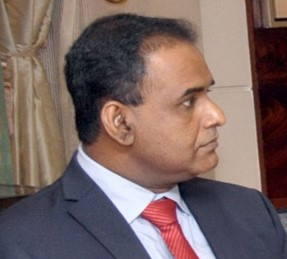
- Harees in March 2015

Member of Parliament for Ampara District
- Incumbent
- Assumed office 8 April 2010
- In office 5 December 2001 – 7 February 2004

Personal details
- Born: 6 September 1971 (age 54)
- Party: Sri Lanka Muslim Congress
- Children: 1
- Profession: Lawyer

Habeeb Mohamed Mohamed Harees (ஹபீப் முஹம்மட் முஹம்மட் ஹரீஸ்) is a Sri Lankan politician and Member of Parliament.

Harees represented the Ampara multi-member electoral district for the Sri Lanka Muslim Congress in the Sri Lankan Parliament between December 2001 and April 2004.

Harees returned to Parliament in April 2010, this time representing Ampara for the United National Front.
