= Cassim Faizal =

Sri Lankan politician

Hon. Cassim Faizal MP
- காசிம் பைசல் කැසිම් ෆයිසාල්

Member of Parliament for Ampara District
- Incumbent
- Assumed office 2 April 2004

Personal details
- Born: September 4, 1957 (age 68)
- Party: Sri Lanka Muslim Congress
- Occupation: Businessman

Mohamed Cassim Mohamed Faizal is a Sri Lankan politician and a member of the Parliament of Sri Lanka.
