= A. L. M. Athaullah =

Sri Lankan politician

Hon. A. L. M. Athaullah MP
- அஹமது லெப்பை மரைக்கார் அதாவுல்லா අහමඩ් ලෙබ්බේ මරික්කාර් අතාවුල්ලා

Minister of Local Government & Provincial Councils
- In office 2010 – 12 January 2015

Minister of Water Supply & Drainage
- In office 2007–2010

Minister of Eastern Infrastructure Development
- In office 2004–2007

Minister of Highways
- In office 2001–2004

Deputy Minister of Education
- In office 2000–2001

Member of Parliament for Ampara District
- In office 20 August 2020 – 24 September 2024
- In office 18 October 2000 – 26 June 2015

Personal details
- Born: 6 October 1957 (age 68)
- Party: National Congress
- Profession: Teacher
- Website: http://almathaullah.lk/

Ahamed Lebbe Maraikkar Athaullah (born 6 October 1957) is a Sri Lankan politician, former Member of Parliament and former cabinet member. He was a representative of the Ampara Disctrict for the United People's Freedom Alliance in the Parliament of Sri Lanka, and was the Minister of Water Supply and Drainage.

== See also ==
- Minister of Local Government and Provincial Councils
