= National Unity Alliance =

Political party in Sri Lanka

National Unity Alliance ජාතික සමගි සන්ධානය / தேசிய ஐக்கியக் கூட்டமைப்பு
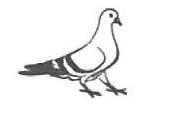
- Leader: Azath Salley
- Chairperson: Mr A.L. Adam Gany
- Secretary-General: Azath Salley
- Treasurer: Naushad Sathar
- Founder: M. H. M. Ashraff
- Founded: 1999; 27 years ago 2022; 4 years ago
- Merged into: Sri Lanka Freedom Party in 2010
- Succeeded by: Azath Salley in 2012
- Headquarters: R A De Mel Mawatha, Colombo 03.
- National affiliation: New Democratic Front (Since 2022)
- Colors: Rainbow Colours
- Deputy General Secretary: Shahul Shabdeen
- Deputy Treasurer: F Ruzna Salley
- National Organizer: A H M Iqbal

Election symbol
- Pigeon

The National Unity Alliance (Tamil: தேசிய ஐக்கியக் கூட்டமைப்பு) is a political alliance in Sri Lanka. Founded in 1999, the alliance ceased to exist in 2010 when its remaining members joined the Sri Lanka Freedom Party. However, Azath Salley subsequently assumed leadership of the party and the party is presently active.

The Alliance held an event to commemorate the 75th birth anniversary of its founder, Honourable M.H.M Ashraff at the BMICH in Colombo, under the patronage of President Chandrika Bandaranaike Kumaratunge as the Chief Guest, President Maithripala Sirisena, Speaker Mahinda Yapa Abeywardena, former minister and wife of Late M H M Ashraff, (Mrs) Ferial Ashraff Hon. Governor Azath Salley were among the special guests of the evening.

Members of the cabinet, parliament, diplomatic corps and close associates of the former minister were also in attendance.

== Present status ==
The National Unity Alliance's was re-activated by Azath S. Salley by a Fundamental Rights petition with the Supreme Court of Sri Lanka. The party is presently 'active' and is recognized by the Elections Commission of Sri Lanka. The leader of the party is Salley.

== History ==
Sri Lanka Muslim Congress (SLMC) leader M. H. M. Ashraff started discussions on forming a new political alliance in 1998. The purpose of the alliance was to bring about unity among Sri Lanka's differing communities. Although initial discussions weren't successful, the alliance was eventually registered with the Department of Elections as a political party on 23 August 1999 with the name National Unity Alliance (NUA). Two political parties were members of the NUA - the SLMC and the Sri Lanka Progressive Front. The aim of the NUA was to create a united Sri Lanka by 2012 and its motto was "Mother Lanka wants every citizen – All citizens want one Sri Lanka".

Both the SLMC and the NUA were members of the governing People's Alliance (PA) but by 2000 relations between the SLMC/NUA and PA had become strained. The SLMC/NUA nevertheless contested the 2000 parliamentary election in alliance with PA - in some electoral districts the SLMC fielded candidates under the PA whilst in others it fielded candidates under the NUA. Contesting in 13 electoral districts the NUA received 197,983 votes (2.29%), winning four seats in Parliament. The SLMC also secured seven seats under the PA.

During the 2000 election campaign Ashraff was killed in a mysterious helicopter crash on 16 September 2000. Just before his death Ashraff had sent faxes to the media stating that the SLMC and NUA had severed all ties with the PA. Following Ashraff's death Rauff Hakeem became the SLMC's "thesiya thalaivar" (national leader) but there was a power struggle between Ashraff's widow Ferial Ashraff and Hakeem for control of the SLMC. In June 2001 President Chandrika Kumaratunga dismissed Hakeem from the cabinet. All SLMC/NUA ministers, including Ferial Ashraff, resigned from the government on the instructions of the SLMC leadership. The SLMC leadership also decided that the SLCM should leave the PA and join the opposition. However, Ferial Ashraff remained in the PA as leader of the NUA. Three SLMC MPs loyal to Ashraff - Wimalaweera Dissanayake, U. M. Hanifa and U. L. M. Mohideen - also remained in the PA.

Contesting under the PA, the NUA secured two seats in Parliament - Ashraff and M. H. Segu Isadean - at the 2001 parliamentary election. On 20 January 2004 the Sri Lanka Freedom Party (SLFP) and the Janatha Vimukthi Peramuna (JVP) formed the United People's Freedom Alliance (UPFA) as a successor to the PA. The NUA joined the UPFA on 2 February 2004. The NUA contested the 2004 parliamentary election under the UPFA and Ashraff and Isadean retained their seats. After the election Ashraff was appointed as a cabinet minister whilst Isadean became a deputy minister.

The alliance became moribund thereafter and in February 2010 Ferial Ashraff and other NUA members joined the SLFP. The alliance was de-registered as a political party in 2012., this was later challenged in court by Azath Salley and the party continues under Mr. Salley's leadership.
