= K. Kodeeswaran =

Sri Lankan politician

Hon. K. Kodeeswaran MP

Member of Parliament for Ampara District
- Incumbent
- Assumed office 17 August 2015

Personal details
- Party: Tamil Eelam Liberation Organization

Ariyanayagam Kaveenthiran Kodeeswaran (Tamil: அரியநாயகம் கவீந்திரன் கோடீசுவரன்; also known as Kodeeswaran Robin Tamil: ரொபின் கோடீசுவரன்) is a Sri Lankan Tamil politician and Member of Parliament.

Kodeeswaran is a member of the Tamil Eelam Liberation Organization. He was one of the Tamil National Alliance's (TNA) candidates in Ampara District at the 2015 parliamentary election. He was elected and entered Parliament.

== Electoral history ==
Electoral history of K. Kodeeswaran
Election	Constituency	Party	Alliance	Votes	Result
2015 parliamentary	Ampara District	Tamil Eelam Liberation Organization	Tamil National Alliance	17,779	Elected
