= M. M. Thahir =

Sri Lankan politician (born 1974)

Hon. M. M. Thahir එම්. එම්. තාහීර් MP

Member of Parliament for Ampara District
- Incumbent
- Assumed office 21 November 2024
- Majority: 14,511 preferential votes

Personal details
- Born: 2 June 1974 (age 51) Nintavur
- Party: All Ceylon Makkal Congress
- Spouse: Ferosa
- Children: 3
- Occupation: businessman

M. M. Thahir (born 2 June 1974) is a Sri Lankan politician and a member of the All Ceylon Makkal Congress. He was elected to the parliament in the 2024 Sri Lankan parliamentary election representing Ampara Electoral District. He is a businessman by profession and also a former chairman of Ninthavur Pradeshiya Sabha, and worked as a member of ACMC high command committee for many years.

== Electoral history ==
Electoral history of M. M. Thahir
Election	Constituency	Party	Votes	Result	Ref.
2024 parliamentary	Ampara District	ACMC	14,511	Elected	
