= Victor Hettigoda =

Sri Lankan politician (1937–2022)

Deshabandu Victor Hettigoda (1937 – 2 April 2022) was a Sri Lankan entrepreneur and a candidate for the 2005 Sri Lankan presidential election. He is considered as one of the most successful Sri Lankan entrepreneurs post-independence and well-known for inventing the world-renowned ayurvedic brand, Siddhalepa. He died on 2 April 2022, at the age of 84.

== Early life ==
Hettigoda, Chairman of Hettigoda Group of Companies, was born at Kananke, Matara in 1937 to a family of resounding standing, reputation, and admiration. Victor was the fifth of a family of nine children. He received his education at Rahula College, Matara. On leaving school, he joined his father as a 'helper student' in pursuit of the ancestral noble profession of Ayurveda Medicine. It took him nearly 12 years to learn the art of Ayurvedic medicine. He spent many late nights burning the mid-night oil, engrossed in the "Ola Leaf" Manuscripts and books on Ayurveda.

Victor was married to a school teacher and has two daughters and a son. The children are also involved in his businesses.

== Manufacturing of Ayurvedic products ==
Victor's untiring efforts and devotion towards Ayurveda won the accolade of his father, resulting in the reward of disclosing the secret Formula of "Siddhalepa" Balm—the Wonder Balm. The desire for independence and the anxiety for achievement were in him, but financial resources were a problem for him. However, the initial investment of Rs 2,500/= came to him from a trusted relative in 1971 to start his venture. One of the biggest investors in the Sri Lankan equity market, Dr. T. Senthilverl, financially supported him to grow his business in the initial stages.

The company originated as a door-to-door sales operation, with its founder traveling across the country to sell balm, soap, and mosquito coils. The enterprise subsequently expanded into an international business, employing 3,500 people and exporting products to 19 countries.

Moreover, Hettigoda was also one of the main founders of the wonder balm, Siddhalepa. The secret formula, which has been guarded for more than 200 years, was disclosed to him by his father, and after working hard to promote the product, is now recognized worldwide as a leader in "Veda Beheth" (Sinhala for herbal based medicine).

Besides the Ayurvedic products, he has also established Ayurvedic hospitals and health resort hotels. There is a modern hospital in Anuradhapura and a compost factory collecting elephant dung in Talawa.

== Presidential election 2005 ==
Hettigoda, one of 13 candidates in a packed field that included then Prime Minister Mahinda Rajapakse and then former Prime Minister and former President Ranil Wickremesinghe, told Sri Lankan newspaper The Island that if elected, he would use his vast fortune to buy a cow for every home in the country. He said that the cows would be used to fight off malnutrition, suggesting that any excess milk, cheese or butter could be exported.
