= Ferial Ashraff =

Sri Lankan politician (born 1953)

Hon. Ferial Ashraff MP
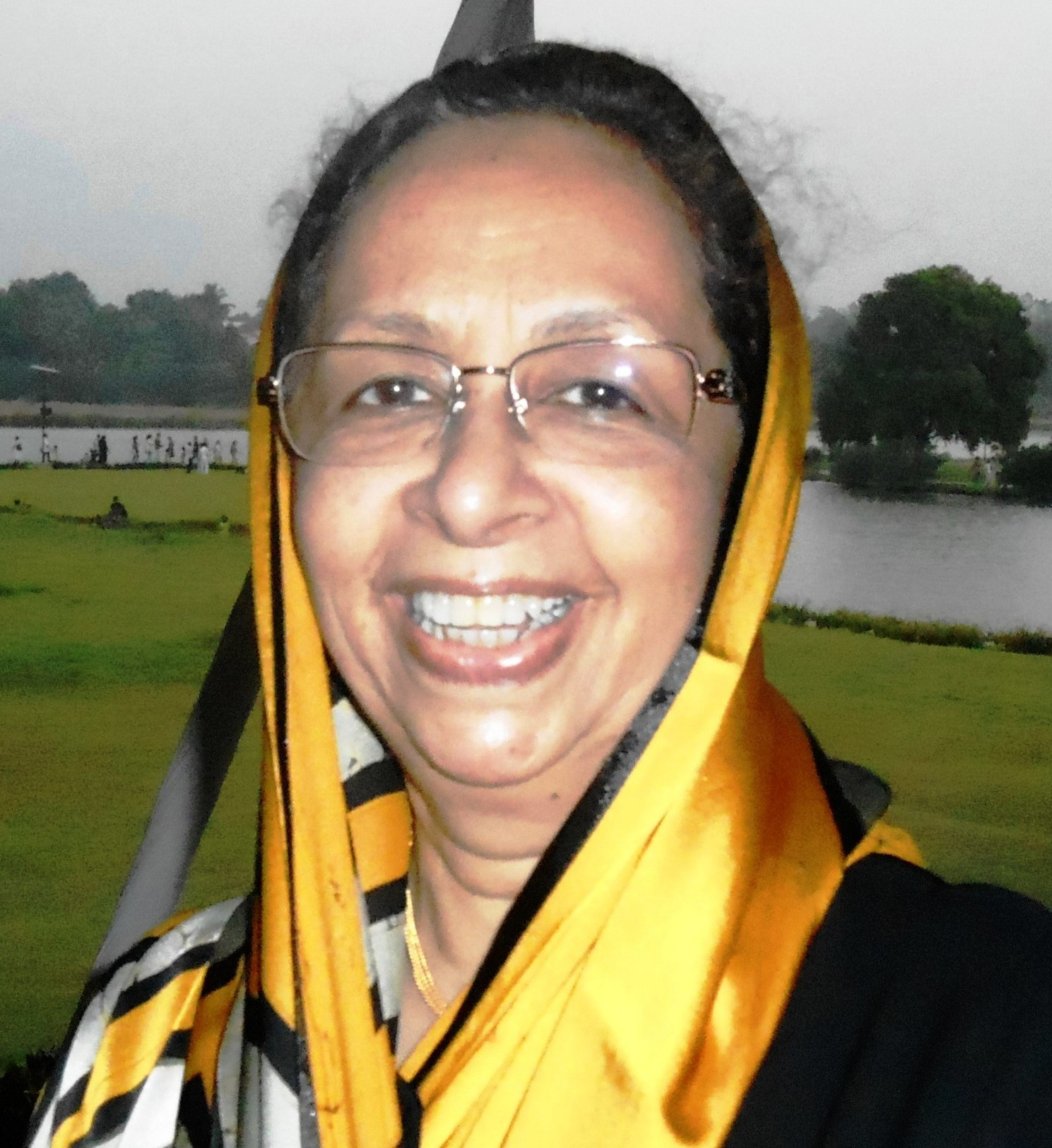

Minister of Housing Construction & Industries, Education Development in Eastern Province & Irrigation Development
- In office 14 September 2001 – 10 April 2004

Minister of Housing & Common Amenities

Member of Parliament for Ampara
- In office 2000–2010

Personal details
- Born: 20 August 1953 (age 73)
- Party: Sri Lanka Freedom Party
- Other political affiliations: United People's Freedom Alliance
- Spouse: M. H. M. Ashraff
- Children: 1
- Education: Zahira College, Gampola
- Occupation: Politician

Ferial Ismail Ashraff (born August 20, 1953) is a Sri Lankan politician. She was the wife of M. H. M. Ashraff, the deceased leader of the Sri Lanka Muslim Congress and the National Unity Alliance. She was the Minister of Housing and Common Amenities under President Chandrika Kumaratunga. She was a representative of Ampara District for the United People's Freedom Alliance in the Parliament of Sri Lanka. She resides in Colombo.

In the 2002 general elections, she became a member of the Parliament of Sri Lanka from Digamadulla, and was appointed the Minister of Housing and Common Amenities. In 2010, she was appointed to the board of the National Institute of Education. In 2011, she was named Sri Lanka's High Commissioner to Singapore.

== Political career ==
The Sri Lanka Muslim Congress, which was founded by M.H.M. Ashraff in 1981, facilitated for the entry of Ferial Ashraff into politics upon the death of her husband for a brief period of time, which led to a power struggle for a new, charismatic leader from the East, a position that both Ferial Ashroff and the SLMC Deputy Leader at the time, Rauff Hakeem contested for. Upon her failure, she broke away from the group and formulated the National Unity Alliance (NUA), a multiethnic political party that sought to center itself upon more than the Muslim Majority Identity.

== See also ==
- List of political families in Sri Lanka
- Sri Lankan Non Career Diplomats
