= M. H. M. Ashraff =

Sri Lankan lawyer, politician and government minister

Hon. M. H. M. Ashraff PC
- එම්. එච්. එම්. අෂ්රෆ් மு. ஹு. மு. அஷ்ரப்

Leader of the Sri Lanka Muslim Congress

Minister of Shipping, Ports and Rehabilitation
- In office 1994–2000
- President: Chandrika Kumaratunga
- Prime Minister: Sirimavo Bandaranaike

Member of Parliament for Ampara District
- In office 1989–2000

Personal details
- Born: 23 October 1948 Sammanthurai, Ceylon
- Died: 16 September 2000 (aged 51) Aranayake, Sri Lanka
- Party: Sri Lanka Muslim Congress
- Spouse: Ferial Ashraff
- Education: Ceylon Law College; University of Colombo
- Profession: Lawyer

Mohammed Hussain Mohammed Ashraff (Tamil: முகம்மது ஹுசைன் முகம்மது அஷ்ரப்; 23 October 1948 – 16 September 2000) was a Sri Lankan lawyer, politician, government minister and founder of the Sri Lanka Muslim Congress.

== Early life and family ==
Ashraff was born on 23 October 1948 in Sammanthurai in south-eastern Ceylon. He was the son of Mohammed Meera Lebbe Hussain, a village headman, and Matheena Ummah. Ashraff grew up in Kalmunai where his maternal family, the Kariappers, were very influential. He was educated at Wesley College, Kalmunai. After school he joined Ceylon Law College, passing his examination with first class honours.

Ashraff married Ferial. They had one son, Aman.

== Career ==
=== Law ===
After qualifying Ashraff started practising criminal law in the Eastern Province in 1974. He joined the Attorney-General's Department as a state counsel in 1975 after a short while returned to practising law. He received a Bachelor's degree and a Master's degree (1995) in law from the University of Colombo later and was appointed President's Counsel in 1997.

=== Writings ===
Ashraff wrote short stories, poems and newspaper/magazine articles in Tamil and English. He had a book of poems called Naan Enum Nee published. He worked as a part-time journalist on the Dinapathi daily newspaper whilst studying at Ceylon Law College. Later he published a left-wing magazine called Samathuvam (Equality). He wrote a Tamil book on the constitutional law.

=== Politics ===
Ashraff was an admirer of Tamil political leader S. J. V. Chelvanayakam and spoke at Illankai Tamil Arasu Kachchi (Federal Party) meetings. Following the Puttalam massacre on 2 February 1976 in which at least 6 Muslim civilians were killed by the police, Muslim MPs remained silent and it was left to Chelvanayakam to raise the matter. Ashraff was appreciative of this. Ashraff attended the Vaddukoddai Conference in May 1976 at which the Tamil United Liberation Front (TULF) unanimously passed the historic Vaddukoddai Resolution calling for the creation of an independent Tamil Eelam.

Ashraff and others formed the Muslim United Liberation Front (MULF) political party in 1977 to represent Sri Lanka's Muslim population. Ashraff was MULF's legal advisor and theoretician. MULF formed an alliance with the TULF to contest the 1977 parliamentary election under the TULF ticket. At an election rally Ashraff famously announced that even if big brother Amirthalingam (leader of TULF) abandoned the Eelam goal, little brother Ashraff would continue to fight for it. The TULF won 18 seats at the election but the MULF candidates performed badly, not winning any seats. Ashraff left MULF in 1980 after it merged with the Sri Lanka Freedom Party. The TULF refused to allow Muslim candidates to contest on the TULF ticket during the May 1981 District Development Council elections which resulted in Ashraff ending his relationship with the TULF.

On 21 September 1981 Ashraff and other leading Muslim politicians established the Sri Lanka Muslim Congress (SLMC) at Kattankudy. The SLMC was initially a cultural organisation. The Black July anti-Tamil riots of 1983 and the ensuing civil war between Tamil militants and the Sri Lankan government caused apprehension amongst the Muslim population. According to M. M. Zuhair, the SLMC was later formed as a political party in order to prevent Muslim youth of the east from joining the LTTE:

"I had retainers from the Eastern Courts and the late M.H.M. Ashraff at that time had a wide practice in the courts of law in the East. Hashim, a former teacher and Advocate from Akkaraipathu who first alerted me to the coming events. His own son had become the Area Leader of the LTTE for Akkaraipathu. He was angry he could not stop his own son from joining the armed group. There were several other young Muslims who were joining the LTTE in numbers. They had lost confidence in both the UNP and the SLFP, and that was why they were joining the Tamils fighting for autonomy, he told me, and if this is not stopped, this would spell great danger, more for the Muslims outside the North-East. I spoke to Ashraff, I told him, the time has come for us to address this growing danger of Muslim boys joining the LTTE. He understood the repercussions and the likely fall-out. He was ready to give up his lucrative practice and form a Muslim Party, as the only way to arrest all possible damages. Ashraff said a Muslim party was the only answer to prevent Muslims joining the LTTE."

The government's decision to resume diplomatic ties with Israel also caused problems. In 1985, violence, stoked by the Sri Lankan government, erupted between Tamils and Muslims living in the Kalmunai-Karaitivu area, causing Ashraff to re-locate to Colombo. Controversially, Ashraff compared his situation to Muhammad's Hijrah from Mecca to Medina, ignoring the fact that he had left his supporters behind in Kalmunai whereas Muhammad took his followers to Medina.

In Colombo Ashraff worked at Faisz Musthapha's chambers. It was there that he came across Rauff Hakeem. Exploiting the political situation in Sri Lanka, Ashraff transformed SLMC into a political party in November 1986, taking over its leadership after ousting Ahamed Lebbe. Ashraff wasn't entirely happy with the 1987 Indo-Lanka Accord but nevertheless supported it. The SLMC contested the 1988 provincial council elections, winning 29 seats including 17 on the North Eastern Provincial Council, becoming its main opposition party. The SLMC supported United National Party candidate Ranasinghe Premadasa at the 1988 presidential election. Ashraff played a key role in the passing of the Fifteenth Amendment to the Constitution of Sri Lanka which reduced the cut-off mark to enter Parliament from 12.5% to 5%, helping smaller parties such as the SLMC.

Ashraff contested the 1989 parliamentary election as one of the SLMC's candidates in Ampara District. He was elected and entered Parliament. He was re-elected at the 1994 parliamentary election. Prior to the election the SLMC had entered into an electoral pact with main opposition People's Alliance (PA). Following the PA's victory the SLMC joined the new government. Ashraff was sworn in as Minister of Shipping, Ports and Rehabilitation on 19 August 1994. Two other SLMC MPs became deputy ministers whilst Hakeem became Deputy Chairman of Committees. Ashraff lost the shipping portfolio later. Ashraff's ministerial career was not without controversies - he was accused of creating jobs for Muslims at state-owned institutions under his control and giving priority to Muslim areas when it came to rehabilitation projects. Ashraff often got into disputes with fellow Muslim minister A. H. M. Fowzie which resulted in Ashraff threatening to resign. Ashraff, who was supreme "Thalaivar" (leader) of the SLMC, dealt harshly with dissension in the party. At the time of his death three SLMC MPs had been suspended from the party by Ashraff.

By 2000 relations between the SLMC and PA had become strained. Earlier, in 1999, Ashraff had founded the National Unity Alliance (NUA) with the aim of creating a "united Sri Lanka by 2012". Ashraff resigned from the government on 22 August 2000, stating that he was severing all ties with the PA and that the SLMC would contest the 2000 parliamentary election on its own, and left for pilgrimage to Mecca but President Chandrika Kumaratunga refused to accept his resignation. On returning to Sri Lanka Ashraff settled his differences with the government and resumed his cabinet position. However, just before Ashraff died he had sent faxes to the media stating that the SLMC and NUA had severed all ties with the PA.

=== Death ===
On the morning of 16 September 2000, at around 9.30am, Ashraff boarded a Sri Lanka Air Force (SLAF) Mi-17 helicopter at the Police Grounds at Bambalapitiya. The flight to Ampara District was to have taken him over Kandy, Randenigala, Maha Oya and Iginiyagala. Besides Ashraff there were 14 others on board - nine party officials, three bodyguards and two crew members. About 40/45 minutes after take-off the helicopter lost radio contact with air traffic controllers. Another SLAF helicopter was sent to search for the missing helicopter in the Hasalaka-Randenigala area. The wreckage of Ashraff's helicopter was found in flames on Bible Rock near Aranayake in Kegalle District. By the time the SLAF rescue team landed and reached the site, the police, assisted by locals, had removed most of the bodies. Ashraff's funeral was held on the same day, at around midnight, at Colombo's Jawatta Muslim burial ground.

The weather at the time of the crash was good. The authorities initially claimed that engine failure had caused the crash. The government immediately ordered an inquiry into the crash and in January 2001 President Kumaratunga appointed a Presidential Commission to inquire into the crash. However, neither found any conclusive evidence for the crash's cause.

== Electoral history ==
Electoral history of M. H. M. Ashraff
Election	Constituency	Party	Votes	Result
1989 parliamentary	Ampara District	SLMC	56,464	Elected
1994 parliamentary	Ampara District	SLMC	69,076	Elected
