= 2005 Sri Lankan presidential election =

- 17 November 2005
- Turnout: 73.73% (▲0.42pp)
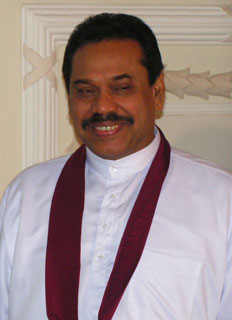

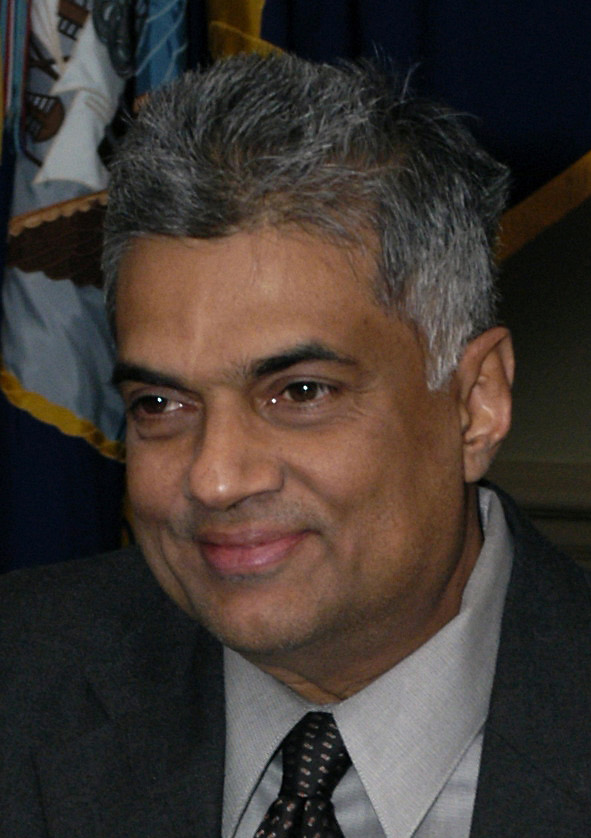
Nominee	Mahinda Rajapaksa	Ranil Wickremesinghe
Party	SLFP	UNP
Alliance	UPFA	UNF
Popular vote	4,887,152	4,706,366
Percentage	50.29%	48.43%
- Results by polling division
President before election
Chandrika Kumaratunga
SLFP
Elected President
Mahinda Rajapaksa
SLFP

Presidential elections were held in Sri Lanka on 17 November 2005. They were the fifth presidential elections held in the country's history. Prime Minister Mahinda Rajapaksa of the governing United People's Freedom Alliance was narrowly elected, defeating his main opponent Ranil Wickremesinghe of the United National Party, and winning 50.29% of the vote.

== Background ==
Then-incumbent president Chandrika Kumaratunga was constitutionally barred from running for a third term in office. The 3rd Amendment to the Constitution of Sri Lanka stated that if a president was re-elected for a second term via an early presidential election, their second term starts on the next date corresponding to the beginning of their first term. Therefore, Kumaratunga's second term would have started on 12 November 2000, as the last election was held on 21 December 1999. Despite this, Kumaratunga was inaugurated to her second term on 22 December 1999, just hours after the election results were announced.

According to the Constitution, if Kumaratunga's second term began on 12 November 2000, her term would have ended on 12 November 2006, therefore the next presidential election should take place between 12 September and 12 October 2006. Since Kumaratunga was inaugurated to her second term on 22 December 1999, however, the public argued that the next presidential election should instead take place between 22 October and 22 November 2005. Kumaratunga argued that the extra year should be appended to her second term, and even stated that she had held a secret swearing-in ceremony on 12 November 2000 to officially begin her second term in office.

Kumaratunga sought the opinion of the Supreme Court of Sri Lanka regarding the correct date for the 2005 presidential election. The Supreme Court rejected her claims on 30 August 2005, and stated that the election should take place between 22 October and 22 November 2005, recognizing that her second term started on 22 December 1999.

== Nominations ==
Nominations were accepted from 9.00am to 11.00am IST on 7 September 2005, and the election date of 17 November was announced by the Gazette Extraordinary No.1411/1 on 19 September 2005.

=== Sri Lanka Freedom Party ===
A rift opened up within the SLFP over who to pick as its candidate: either Anura Bandaranaike, Kumaratunga's brother and preferred candidate, or then-incumbent prime minister Mahinda Rajapaksa.

Many members of the SLFP were uneasy with Kumaratunga's liberal economic policies, including the privatisation of several public institutions. Despite internal disagreements, Rajapaksa was ultimately selected as the presidential candidate of the SLFP-led United People's Freedom Alliance (UPFA).

=== United National Party ===
The UNP chose Ranil Wickremesinghe as its candidate, while Karu Jayasuriya was named as the party's prime ministerial candidate in the event of a UNP victory, serving as Wickremesinghe's unofficial running mate.

== Campaign ==
Both candidates tried to round up the support of minor parties. Rajapaksa needed to re-assemble the alliance with the Janatha Vimukthi Peramuna (JVP) that existed at the parliamentary level (the United People's Freedom Alliance). After he agreed to reject federalism and renegotiate the ceasefire with the Liberation Tigers of Tamil Eelam, the JVP and the Jathika Hela Urumaya endorsed him.

Wickremesinghe's only hope of victory was through the support of the island's ethnic minorities, given his generally more conciliatory approach to the civil war. He secured the endorsement of the main Muslim party, the Sri Lanka Muslim Congress, and the Ceylon Workers' Congress representing the estate Tamils. He could not, however, obtain the backing of the main Sri Lankan Tamil party, the Tamil National Alliance. Any hopes for Wickremesinghe's victory were effectively dashed when the LTTE ordered Tamil voters, most of whom would have likely voted for him, to boycott the polls.

Economic issues also worked to Rajapaksa's favor. Sri Lanka had enjoyed stable growth under Kumaratunga's free-market policies, but she had also pursued controversial privatizations which Rajapaksa promised to halt. Rajapaksa also promised a policy of economic nationalism.

=== Proposed debate ===
In the lead-up to the 2005 presidential election, Rajapaksa's campaign team received invitations from both state and private television networks to participate in a live debate with Wickremesinghe. Networks including Rupavahini, ITN, Swarnawahini, and MTV extended invitations to both candidates. Wickremesinghe agreed to participate and chose Sirasa (managed by MTV) as the platform. Rajapaksa delayed, citing the need to either select a single channel or participate across all channels based on committee recommendations. Wickremesinghe suggested a single simultaneous broadcast across all networks. The debate was intended to focus on key issues such as the economy, the peace process with the LTTE, nationalism, and federalism, with Wickremesinghe positioning himself as a peacemaker and Rajapaksa emphasizing nationalist themes.

Disagreements arose over the choice of moderator: the UNP preferred Ranjith Abeysuriya, while the UPFA proposed former presidential secretary K. H. J. Wijedasa. Rajapaksa also insisted that only the state-owned Rupavahini host the debate, whereas the UNP advocated including private networks.

Due to unresolved disputes over the format, moderation, and network participation, coupled with concerns regarding Rajapaksa's debating experience and confidence, the debate ultimately never took place.

== Results ==
Mahinda Rajapaksa won the election and became the 5th Executive President of Sri Lanka, defeating Ranil Wickremesinghe by a narrow margin. Rajapaksa was inaugurated on 19 November 2005 at the Presidential Secretariat in Colombo.

Candidate	Party	Votes	%
Mahinda Rajapaksa	Sri Lanka Freedom Party	4,887,152	50.29
Ranil Wickremesinghe	United National Party	4,706,366	48.43
Siritunga Jayasuriya	United Socialist Party	35,425	0.36
A. A. Suraweera	National Development Front	31,238	0.32
Victor Hettigoda	United Lanka People's Party	14,458	0.15
Chamil Jayaneththi	New Left Front	9,296	0.10
Aruna de Soyza	Ruhunu People's Party	7,685	0.08
Wimal Geeganage	Sri Lanka National Front	6,639	0.07
Anura de Silva	United Lalith Front	6,357	0.07
Ajith Arachchige	Democratic Unity Alliance	5,082	0.05
Wije Dias	Socialist Equality Party	3,500	0.04
Nelson Perera	Sri Lanka Progressive Front	2,525	0.03
Hewaheenipellage Dharmadwaja	United National Alternative Front	1,316	0.01
Total		9,717,039	100.00
Valid votes		9,717,039	98.88
Invalid/blank votes		109,739	1.12
Total votes		9,826,778	100.00
Registered voters/turnout		13,327,160	73.73
Source: Election Commission

Popular vote (%)
Rajapaksha	50.29%
Wickremesinghe	48.43%

Geographical Share (%)
Rajapaksha	58.75%
Wickremesinghe	41.25%

=== By district ===
Districts won by Rajapaksa
Districts won by Wickremesinghe

Summary of the 2005 Sri Lankan presidential election by electoral district
District	Province	Rajapaksa		Wickremesinghe		Others		Turnout
District	Province	Votes	%	Votes	%	Votes	%	Turnout
Colombo	Western	534,431	47.96%	569,627	51.12%	10,192	0.92%	76.75%
Gampaha	Western	596,698	54.78%	481,764	44.23%	10,815	0.99%	80.71%
Kalutara	Western	341,693	55.48%	266,043	43.20%	8,124	1.32%	81.43%
Kandy	Central	315,672	44.30%	387,150	54.33%	9,798	1.37%	79.65%
Matale	Central	120,533	48.09%	125,937	50.25%	4,150	1.66%	79.04%
Nuwara Eliya	Central	99,550	27.97%	250,428	70.37%	5,897	1.66%	80.78%
Galle	Southern	347,223	58.41%	239,320	40.26%	7,925	1.33%	81.94%
Matara	Southern	279,411	61.85%	165,827	36.71%	6,484	1.44%	80.96%
Hambantota	Southern	202,918	63.43%	112,712	35.23%	4,295	1.34%	81.41%
Jaffna	Northern	1,967	25.00%	5,523	70.20%	1,034	4.8%	1.21%
Vanni	Northern	17,197	20.36%	65,798	77.89%	2,879	1.75%	34.30%
Batticaloa	Eastern	28,836	18.87%	121,514	79.51%	4,265	1.62%	48.51%
Ampara	Eastern	122,329	42.88%	159,198	55.81%	6,681	1.31%	72.7%
Trincomalee	Eastern	55,680	37.04%	92,197	61.33%	4,551	1.63%	63.84%
Kurunegala	North Western	468,507	52.56%	418,809	46.72%	17,639	0.72%	80.51%
Puttalam	North Western	160,686	48.14%	169,264	50.71%	3,833	1.15%	71.68%
Anuradhapura	North Central	231,040	55.08%	182,956	42.62%	5,438	2.3%	78.98%
Polonnaruwa	North Central	110,499	52.61%	97,142	46.25%	2,389	1.14%	80.43%
Badulla	Uva	192,734	45.18%	226,582	53.11%	7,283	1.71%	81.29%
Monaragala	Uva	126,094	56.94%	92,244	41.65%	3,112	1.41%	81.16%
Ratnapura	Sabaragamuwa	294,260	53.01%	252,838	45.55%	7,976	1.44%	83.89%
Kegalle	Sabaragamuwa	239,184	51.02%	223,483	47.67%	6,106	1.31%	81.19%
Total		4,887,152	50.29%	4,706,366	48.43%	123,521	1.28%	73.73%

== Maps ==
Majorities according to polling divisions

Majorities according to electoral districts
