= Ratgama Polling Division =

Ratgama
- Polling Division
- Coordinates: 6.154226°N 80.110039°E
- Country: Sri Lanka
- Province: Southern Province, Sri Lanka
- Electoral District: Galle Electoral District

Area
  - Total: 66.81 km^{2} (25.80 sq mi)

Population (2012)
  - Total: 101,909
  - Density: 1,525/km^{2} (3,950/sq mi)
- ISO 3166 code: EC-07G

The Ratgama Polling Division is a Polling Division in the Galle Electoral District, in the Southern Province, Sri Lanka.

== Presidential Election Results ==
=== Summary ===
The winner of Ratgama has matched the final country result 6 out of 8 times. Hence, Ratgama is a Weak Bellwether for Presidential Elections.

Year	Ratgama	Galle Electoral District	MAE %	Sri Lanka	MAE %
2019	SLPP	SLPP	3.24%	SLPP	14.44%
2015	UPFA	UPFA	4.84%	NDF	12.72%
2010	UPFA	UPFA	3.25%	UPFA	8.73%
2005	UPFA	UPFA	2.39%	UPFA	10.43%
1999	PA	PA	0.83%	PA	4.67%
1994	PA	PA	0.08%	PA	1.04%
1988	SLFP	SLFP	0.96%	UNP	5.85%
1982	UNP	UNP	3.44%	UNP	6.48%
Matches/Mean MAE	6/8	6/8	2.38%	8/8	8.04%

=== 2019 Sri Lankan Presidential Election ===
Party	Ratgama		Galle Electoral District		Sri Lanka	
Party	Votes	%	Votes	%	Votes	%
SLPP	42,756	67.92%	466,148	64.26%	6,924,255	52.25%
NDF	17,062	27.11%	217,401	29.97%	5,564,239	41.99%
NMPP	1,896	3.01%	27,006	3.72%	418,553	3.16%
Other Parties (with < 1%)	1,233	1.96%	14,803	2.04%	345,452	2.61%
Valid Votes	62,947	99.09%	725,358	99.20%	13,252,499	98.99%
Rejected Votes	581	0.91%	5,878	0.80%	135,452	1.01%
Total Polled	63,528	82.66%	731,236	85.15%	13,387,951	83.71%
Registered Electors	76,853		858,749		15,992,568	

=== 2015 Sri Lankan Presidential Election ===
Party	Ratgama		Galle Electoral District		Sri Lanka	
Party	Votes	%	Votes	%	Votes	%
UPFA	36,209	60.57%	377,126	55.64%	5,768,090	47.58%
NDF	23,038	38.54%	293,994	43.37%	6,217,162	51.28%
Other Parties (with < 1%)	536	0.90%	6,691	0.99%	138,200	1.14%
Valid Votes	59,783	99.20%	677,811	99.05%	12,123,452	98.85%
Rejected Votes	480	0.80%	6,516	0.95%	140,925	1.15%
Total Polled	60,263	77.08%	684,327	80.46%	12,264,377	78.69%
Registered Electors	78,182		850,549		15,585,942	

=== 2010 Sri Lankan Presidential Election ===
Party	Ratgama		Galle Electoral District		Sri Lanka	
Party	Votes	%	Votes	%	Votes	%
UPFA	37,329	67.05%	386,971	63.69%	6,015,934	57.88%
NDF	17,617	31.64%	211,633	34.83%	4,173,185	40.15%
Other Parties (with < 1%)	726	1.30%	9,017	1.48%	204,494	1.97%
Valid Votes	55,672	99.40%	607,621	99.38%	10,393,613	99.03%
Rejected Votes	336	0.60%	3,765	0.62%	101,838	0.97%
Total Polled	56,008	75.24%	611,386	77.82%	10,495,451	66.70%
Registered Electors	74,442		785,663		15,734,587	

=== 2005 Sri Lankan Presidential Election ===
Party	Ratgama		Galle Electoral District		Sri Lanka	
Party	Votes	%	Votes	%	Votes	%
UPFA	34,259	60.89%	347,233	58.41%	4,887,152	50.29%
UNP	21,330	37.91%	239,320	40.26%	4,706,366	48.43%
Other Parties (with < 1%)	676	1.20%	7,915	1.33%	123,521	1.27%
Valid Votes	56,265	99.12%	594,468	99.08%	9,717,039	98.88%
Rejected Votes	498	0.88%	5,540	0.92%	109,869	1.12%
Total Polled	56,763	76.98%	600,008	79.86%	9,826,908	69.51%
Registered Electors	73,737		751,327		14,136,979	

=== 1999 Sri Lankan Presidential Election ===
Party	Ratgama		Galle Electoral District		Sri Lanka	
Party	Votes	%	Votes	%	Votes	%
PA	28,404	56.03%	281,154	54.91%	4,312,157	51.12%
UNP	19,134	37.74%	195,906	38.26%	3,602,748	42.71%
JVP	2,497	4.93%	27,257	5.32%	343,927	4.08%
Other Parties (with < 1%)	663	1.31%	7,702	1.50%	176,679	2.09%
Valid Votes	50,698	98.54%	512,019	98.14%	8,435,754	97.69%
Rejected Votes	749	1.46%	9,716	1.86%	199,536	2.31%
Total Polled	51,447	75.10%	521,735	77.43%	8,635,290	72.17%
Registered Electors	68,503		673,785		11,965,536	

=== 1994 Sri Lankan Presidential Election ===
Party	Ratgama		Galle Electoral District		Sri Lanka	
Party	Votes	%	Votes	%	Votes	%
PA	28,618	61.46%	285,398	61.40%	4,709,205	62.28%
UNP	17,406	37.38%	173,282	37.28%	2,715,283	35.91%
Other Parties (with < 1%)	539	1.16%	6,135	1.32%	137,040	1.81%
Valid Votes	46,563	98.60%	464,815	98.49%	7,561,526	98.03%
Rejected Votes	660	1.40%	7,112	1.51%	151,706	1.97%
Total Polled	47,223	71.31%	471,927	73.01%	7,713,232	69.12%
Registered Electors	66,221		646,373		11,158,880	

=== 1988 Sri Lankan Presidential Election ===
Party	Ratgama		Galle Electoral District		Sri Lanka	
Party	Votes	%	Votes	%	Votes	%
SLFP	13,290	51.37%	148,615	53.09%	2,289,857	44.95%
UNP	11,539	44.60%	124,912	44.62%	2,569,199	50.43%
SLMP	1,043	4.03%	6,417	2.29%	235,701	4.63%
Valid Votes	25,872	98.27%	279,944	98.43%	5,094,754	98.24%
Rejected Votes	456	1.73%	4,461	1.57%	91,499	1.76%
Total Polled	26,328	43.25%	284,405	49.34%	5,186,256	55.87%
Registered Electors	60,877		576,390		9,283,143	

=== 1982 Sri Lankan Presidential Election ===
Party	Ratgama		Galle Electoral District		Sri Lanka	
Party	Votes	%	Votes	%	Votes	%
UNP	20,801	46.20%	211,544	50.23%	3,450,815	52.93%
SLFP	20,798	46.19%	180,925	42.96%	2,546,348	39.05%
JVP	2,409	5.35%	20,962	4.98%	273,428	4.19%
LSSP	907	2.01%	6,391	1.52%	58,531	0.90%
Other Parties (with < 1%)	110	0.24%	1,316	0.31%	190,929	2.93%
Valid Votes	45,025	98.37%	421,138	98.78%	6,520,156	98.78%
Rejected Votes	748	1.63%	5,198	1.22%	80,470	1.22%
Total Polled	45,773	82.93%	426,336	81.84%	6,600,626	80.15%
Registered Electors	55,193		520,909		8,235,358	

== Parliamentary Election Results ==
=== Summary ===
The winner of Ratgama has matched the final country result 5 out of 7 times. Hence, Ratgama is a Weak Bellwether for Parliamentary Elections.

Year	Ratgama	Galle Electoral District	MAE %	Sri Lanka	MAE %
2015	UPFA	UPFA	3.97%	UNP	8.47%
2010	UPFA	UPFA	2.82%	UPFA	7.24%
2004	UPFA	UPFA	0.74%	UPFA	5.41%
2001	PA	UNP	1.81%	UNP	4.64%
2000	PA	PA	1.36%	PA	3.57%
1994	PA	PA	0.60%	PA	4.33%
1989	UNP	UNP	4.02%	UNP	3.28%
Matches/Mean MAE	5/7	6/7	2.19%	7/7	5.28%

=== 2015 Sri Lankan Parliamentary Election ===
Party	Ratgama		Galle Electoral District		Sri Lanka	
Party	Votes	%	Votes	%	Votes	%
UPFA	29,554	54.54%	312,518	50.07%	4,732,664	42.48%
UNP	20,869	38.51%	265,180	42.49%	5,098,916	45.77%
JVP	2,928	5.40%	37,778	6.05%	544,154	4.88%
Other Parties (with < 1%)	834	1.54%	8,659	1.39%	82,852	0.74%
Valid Votes	54,185	97.53%	624,135	97.63%	11,140,333	95.35%
Rejected Votes	1,364	2.46%	15,107	2.36%	516,926	4.42%
Total Polled	55,556	71.06%	639,318	78.00%	11,684,111	77.66%
Registered Electors	78,182		819,666		15,044,490	

=== 2010 Sri Lankan Parliamentary Election ===
Party	Ratgama		Galle Electoral District		Sri Lanka	
Party	Votes	%	Votes	%	Votes	%
UPFA	28,814	69.35%	305,307	66.17%	4,846,388	60.38%
UNP	9,729	23.42%	120,101	26.03%	2,357,057	29.37%
DNA	2,821	6.79%	33,663	7.30%	441,251	5.50%
Other Parties (with < 1%)	183	0.44%	2,317	0.50%	32,313	0.40%
Valid Votes	41,547	95.33%	461,388	95.05%	8,026,322	96.03%
Rejected Votes	2,037	4.67%	24,013	4.95%	581,465	6.96%
Total Polled	43,584	58.55%	485,401	61.67%	8,358,246	59.29%
Registered Electors	74,442		787,139		14,097,690	

=== 2004 Sri Lankan Parliamentary Election ===
Party	Ratgama		Galle Electoral District		Sri Lanka	
Party	Votes	%	Votes	%	Votes	%
UPFA	29,413	57.27%	306,385	56.58%	4,223,126	45.70%
UNP	19,408	37.79%	209,399	38.67%	3,486,792	37.73%
JHU	2,267	4.41%	22,826	4.22%	552,723	5.98%
Other Parties (with < 1%)	267	0.52%	2,901	0.54%	60,066	0.65%
Valid Votes	51,355	94.63%	541,511	94.69%	9,241,931	94.52%
Rejected Votes	2,913	5.37%	30,380	5.31%	534,452	5.47%
Total Polled	54,268	74.33%	571,891	79.81%	9,777,821	75.74%
Registered Electors	73,009		716,609		12,909,631	

=== 2001 Sri Lankan Parliamentary Election ===
Party	Ratgama		Galle Electoral District		Sri Lanka	
Party	Votes	%	Votes	%	Votes	%
PA	24,018	45.28%	232,931	42.98%	3,330,815	37.19%
UNP	22,487	42.40%	238,989	44.10%	4,086,026	45.62%
JVP	5,715	10.77%	61,806	11.41%	815,353	9.10%
Other Parties (with < 1%)	821	1.55%	8,188	1.51%	143,033	1.60%
Valid Votes	53,041	95.74%	541,914	95.66%	8,955,844	94.77%
Rejected Votes	2,360	4.26%	24,561	4.34%	494,009	5.23%
Total Polled	55,401	77.39%	566,475	81.09%	9,449,878	76.03%
Registered Electors	71,584		698,558		12,428,762	

=== 2000 Sri Lankan Parliamentary Election ===
Party	Ratgama		Galle Electoral District		Sri Lanka	
Party	Votes	%	Votes	%	Votes	%
PA	26,619	51.37%	264,601	50.08%	3,899,329	45.33%
UNP	19,910	38.42%	212,055	40.14%	3,451,765	40.12%
JVP	4,274	8.25%	41,620	7.88%	518,725	6.03%
Other Parties (with < 1%)	1,019	1.97%	10,072	1.91%	250,489	2.91%
Valid Votes	51,822	N/A	528,348	N/A	8,602,617	N/A

=== 1994 Sri Lankan Parliamentary Election ===
Party	Ratgama		Galle Electoral District		Sri Lanka	
Party	Votes	%	Votes	%	Votes	%
PA	27,243	55.70%	277,956	56.39%	3,887,805	48.94%
UNP	20,412	41.73%	203,268	41.24%	3,498,370	44.04%
SLPF	891	1.82%	7,239	1.47%	90,078	1.13%
Other Parties (with < 1%)	364	0.74%	4,451	0.90%	69,351	0.87%
Valid Votes	48,910	95.82%	492,914	95.96%	7,943,688	95.20%
Rejected Votes	2,132	4.18%	20,763	4.04%	400,395	4.80%
Total Polled	51,042	77.08%	513,677	79.57%	8,344,095	74.75%
Registered Electors	66,221		645,559		11,163,064	

=== 1989 Sri Lankan Parliamentary Election ===
Party	Ratgama		Galle Electoral District		Sri Lanka	
Party	Votes	%	Votes	%	Votes	%
UNP	21,511	53.77%	183,962	50.40%	2,838,005	50.71%
SLFP	14,593	36.48%	152,096	41.67%	1,785,369	31.90%
USA	3,100	7.75%	18,160	4.98%	141,983	2.54%
MEP	534	1.33%	2,676	0.73%	90,480	1.62%
Other Parties (with < 1%)	265	0.66%	8,111	2.22%	269,739	4.82%
Valid Votes	40,003	93.61%	365,005	93.94%	5,596,468	93.87%
Rejected Votes	2,729	6.39%	23,536	6.06%	365,563	6.13%
Total Polled	42,732	71.81%	388,541	68.03%	5,962,031	63.60%
Registered Electors	59,508		571,146		9,374,164	

== Demographics ==
=== Ethnicity ===
The Ratgama Polling Division has a Sinhalese majority (99.5%) . In comparison, the Galle Electoral District (which contains the Ratgama Polling Division) has a Sinhalese majority (94.4%)

Ethnicity in Ratgama
1. Sinhalese (99.5%)
2. Other (0.50%)

=== Religion ===
The Ratgama Polling Division has a Buddhist majority (99.1%) . In comparison, the Galle Electoral District (which contains the Ratgama Polling Division) has a Buddhist majority (93.9%)

Religion in Ratgama
1. Buddhist (99.1%)
2. Other (0.90%)
