= Nalin Hewage =

Member of Parliament of Sri Lanka

Hon. Nalin Hewage MP
- නලින් හේවගේ நளின் ஹேவகே

Member of Parliament for Galle District
- Incumbent
- Assumed office 21 November 2024
- Majority: 274,707 Preferential votes

Personal details
- Party: National People's Power
- Education: University of Peradeniya

Nalin Hewage is a Sri Lankan politician and a member of the Parliament of Sri Lanka from Galle Electoral District since 2024 as a member of the National People's Power. He is also a national executive committee Member of NPP.

== Electoral history ==
Electoral history of
Election	Constituency	Party	Votes	Result	Ref
2024 parliamentary	Galle District	National People's Power	274,707	Elected	
