= Akmeemana Polling Division =

Akmeemana
- Polling Division
- Interactive map of Akmeemana
- Coordinates: 6.058691°N 80.259485°E
- Country: Sri Lanka
- Province: Southern Province, Sri Lanka
- Electoral District: Galle Electoral District

Area
  - Total: 94.84 km^{2} (36.62 sq mi)

Population (2012)
  - Total: 128,107
  - Density: 1,351/km^{2} (3,500/sq mi)
- ISO 3166 code: EC-07I

The Akmeemana Polling Division is a Polling Division in the Galle Electoral District, in the Southern Province, Sri Lanka.

== Presidential Election Results ==
=== Summary ===
The winner of Akmeemana has matched the final country result 6 out of 8 times. Hence, Akmeemana is a Weak Bellwether for Presidential Elections.

Year	Akmeemana	Galle Electoral District	MAE %	Sri Lanka	MAE %
2019	SLPP	SLPP	0.52%	SLPP	11.08%
2015	UPFA	UPFA	2.90%	NDF	4.99%
2010	UPFA	UPFA	2.18%	UPFA	3.32%
2005	UPFA	UPFA	0.52%	UPFA	8.55%
1999	PA	PA	1.53%	PA	5.36%
1994	PA	PA	0.09%	PA	0.99%
1988	SLFP	SLFP	3.17%	UNP	9.77%
1982	UNP	UNP	2.67%	UNP	5.52%
Matches/Mean MAE	6/8	6/8	1.70%	8/8	6.20%

=== 2019 Sri Lankan Presidential Election ===
Party	Akmeemana		Galle Electoral District		Sri Lanka	
Party	Votes	%	Votes	%	Votes	%
SLPP	51,418	63.58%	466,148	64.26%	6,924,255	52.25%
NDF	24,117	29.82%	217,401	29.97%	5,564,239	41.99%
NMPP	3,745	4.63%	27,006	3.72%	418,553	3.16%
Other Parties (with < 1%)	1,595	1.97%	14,803	2.04%	345,452	2.61%
Valid Votes	80,875	99.26%	725,358	99.20%	13,252,499	98.99%
Rejected Votes	605	0.74%	5,878	0.80%	135,452	1.01%
Total Polled	81,480	85.22%	731,236	85.15%	13,387,951	83.71%
Registered Electors	95,614		858,749		15,992,568	

=== 2015 Sri Lankan Presidential Election ===
Party	Akmeemana		Galle Electoral District		Sri Lanka	
Party	Votes	%	Votes	%	Votes	%
UPFA	39,604	52.77%	377,126	55.64%	5,768,090	47.58%
NDF	34,807	46.38%	293,994	43.37%	6,217,162	51.28%
Other Parties (with < 1%)	643	0.86%	6,691	0.99%	138,200	1.14%
Valid Votes	75,054	99.03%	677,811	99.05%	12,123,452	98.85%
Rejected Votes	738	0.97%	6,516	0.95%	140,925	1.15%
Total Polled	75,792	80.48%	684,327	80.46%	12,264,377	78.69%
Registered Electors	94,175		850,549		15,585,942	

=== 2010 Sri Lankan Presidential Election ===
Party	Akmeemana		Galle Electoral District		Sri Lanka	
Party	Votes	%	Votes	%	Votes	%
UPFA	40,321	61.53%	386,971	63.69%	6,015,934	57.88%
NDF	24,345	37.15%	211,633	34.83%	4,173,185	40.15%
Other Parties (with < 1%)	860	1.31%	9,017	1.48%	204,494	1.97%
Valid Votes	65,526	99.44%	607,621	99.38%	10,393,613	99.03%
Rejected Votes	371	0.56%	3,765	0.62%	101,838	0.97%
Total Polled	65,897	77.64%	611,386	77.82%	10,495,451	66.70%
Registered Electors	84,872		785,663		15,734,587	

=== 2005 Sri Lankan Presidential Election ===
Party	Akmeemana		Galle Electoral District		Sri Lanka	
Party	Votes	%	Votes	%	Votes	%
UPFA	36,424	58.96%	347,233	58.41%	4,887,152	50.29%
UNP	24,570	39.77%	239,320	40.26%	4,706,366	48.43%
Other Parties (with < 1%)	785	1.27%	7,915	1.33%	123,521	1.27%
Valid Votes	61,779	99.10%	594,468	99.08%	9,717,039	98.88%
Rejected Votes	560	0.90%	5,540	0.92%	109,869	1.12%
Total Polled	62,339	79.42%	600,008	79.86%	9,826,908	69.51%
Registered Electors	78,496		751,327		14,136,979	

=== 1999 Sri Lankan Presidential Election ===
Party	Akmeemana		Galle Electoral District		Sri Lanka	
Party	Votes	%	Votes	%	Votes	%
PA	30,327	56.73%	281,154	54.91%	4,312,157	51.12%
UNP	19,749	36.94%	195,906	38.26%	3,602,748	42.71%
JVP	2,602	4.87%	27,257	5.32%	343,927	4.08%
Other Parties (with < 1%)	783	1.46%	7,702	1.50%	176,679	2.09%
Valid Votes	53,461	98.04%	512,019	98.14%	8,435,754	97.69%
Rejected Votes	1,070	1.96%	9,716	1.86%	199,536	2.31%
Total Polled	54,531	78.77%	521,735	77.43%	8,635,290	72.17%
Registered Electors	69,229		673,785		11,965,536	

=== 1994 Sri Lankan Presidential Election ===
Party	Akmeemana		Galle Electoral District		Sri Lanka	
Party	Votes	%	Votes	%	Votes	%
PA	29,135	61.52%	285,398	61.40%	4,709,205	62.28%
UNP	17,679	37.33%	173,282	37.28%	2,715,283	35.91%
Other Parties (with < 1%)	546	1.15%	6,135	1.32%	137,040	1.81%
Valid Votes	47,360	98.60%	464,815	98.49%	7,561,526	98.03%
Rejected Votes	672	1.40%	7,112	1.51%	151,706	1.97%
Total Polled	48,032	74.68%	471,927	73.01%	7,713,232	69.12%
Registered Electors	64,320		646,373		11,158,880	

=== 1988 Sri Lankan Presidential Election ===
Party	Akmeemana		Galle Electoral District		Sri Lanka	
Party	Votes	%	Votes	%	Votes	%
SLFP	22,877	56.62%	148,615	53.09%	2,289,857	44.95%
UNP	16,865	41.74%	124,912	44.62%	2,569,199	50.43%
SLMP	664	1.64%	6,417	2.29%	235,701	4.63%
Valid Votes	40,406	99.10%	279,944	98.43%	5,094,754	98.24%
Rejected Votes	368	0.90%	4,461	1.57%	91,499	1.76%
Total Polled	40,774	70.64%	284,405	49.34%	5,186,256	55.87%
Registered Electors	57,724		576,390		9,283,143	

=== 1982 Sri Lankan Presidential Election ===
Party	Akmeemana		Galle Electoral District		Sri Lanka	
Party	Votes	%	Votes	%	Votes	%
UNP	20,269	48.51%	211,544	50.23%	3,450,815	52.93%
SLFP	19,623	46.97%	180,925	42.96%	2,546,348	39.05%
JVP	1,533	3.67%	20,962	4.98%	273,428	4.19%
Other Parties (with < 1%)	355	0.85%	7,707	1.83%	249,460	3.83%
Valid Votes	41,780	99.08%	421,138	98.78%	6,520,156	98.78%
Rejected Votes	389	0.92%	5,198	1.22%	80,470	1.22%
Total Polled	42,169	82.57%	426,336	81.84%	6,600,626	80.15%
Registered Electors	51,073		520,909		8,235,358	

== Parliamentary Election Results ==
=== Summary ===
The winner of Akmeemana has matched the final country result 5 out of 7 times. Hence, Akmeemana is a Weak Bellwether for Parliamentary Elections.

Year	Akmeemana	Galle Electoral District	MAE %	Sri Lanka	MAE %
2015	UPFA	UPFA	0.67%	UNP	4.70%
2010	UPFA	UPFA	1.01%	UPFA	3.73%
2004	UPFA	UPFA	0.74%	UPFA	4.77%
2001	PA	UNP	1.27%	UNP	3.84%
2000	PA	PA	1.75%	PA	3.81%
1994	PA	PA	0.21%	PA	4.76%
1989	UNP	UNP	4.01%	UNP	6.56%
Matches/Mean MAE	5/7	6/7	1.38%	7/7	4.60%

=== 2015 Sri Lankan Parliamentary Election ===
Party	Akmeemana		Galle Electoral District		Sri Lanka	
Party	Votes	%	Votes	%	Votes	%
UPFA	33,819	49.27%	312,518	50.07%	4,732,664	42.48%
UNP	28,902	42.10%	265,180	42.49%	5,098,916	45.77%
JVP	5,330	7.76%	37,778	6.05%	544,154	4.88%
Other Parties (with < 1%)	594	0.87%	8,659	1.39%	82,852	0.74%
Valid Votes	68,645	97.87%	624,135	97.63%	11,140,333	95.35%
Rejected Votes	1,484	2.12%	15,107	2.36%	516,926	4.42%
Total Polled	70,136	74.47%	639,318	78.00%	11,684,111	77.66%
Registered Electors	94,175		819,666		15,044,490	

=== 2010 Sri Lankan Parliamentary Election ===
Party	Akmeemana		Galle Electoral District		Sri Lanka	
Party	Votes	%	Votes	%	Votes	%
UPFA	31,998	64.92%	305,307	66.17%	4,846,388	60.38%
UNP	13,062	26.50%	120,101	26.03%	2,357,057	29.37%
DNA	4,026	8.17%	33,663	7.30%	441,251	5.50%
Other Parties (with < 1%)	201	0.41%	2,317	0.50%	32,313	0.40%
Valid Votes	49,287	96.03%	461,388	95.05%	8,026,322	96.03%
Rejected Votes	2,036	3.97%	24,013	4.95%	581,465	6.96%
Total Polled	51,323	60.47%	485,401	61.67%	8,358,246	59.29%
Registered Electors	84,872		787,139		14,097,690	

=== 2004 Sri Lankan Parliamentary Election ===
Party	Akmeemana		Galle Electoral District		Sri Lanka	
Party	Votes	%	Votes	%	Votes	%
UPFA	30,897	55.64%	306,385	56.58%	4,223,126	45.70%
UNP	21,249	38.27%	209,399	38.67%	3,486,792	37.73%
JHU	3,095	5.57%	22,826	4.22%	552,723	5.98%
Other Parties (with < 1%)	286	0.52%	2,901	0.54%	60,066	0.65%
Valid Votes	55,527	94.86%	541,511	94.69%	9,241,931	94.52%
Rejected Votes	3,007	5.14%	30,380	5.31%	534,452	5.47%
Total Polled	58,534	76.92%	571,891	79.81%	9,777,821	75.74%
Registered Electors	76,101		716,609		12,909,631	

=== 2001 Sri Lankan Parliamentary Election ===
Party	Akmeemana		Galle Electoral District		Sri Lanka	
Party	Votes	%	Votes	%	Votes	%
PA	25,562	45.19%	232,931	42.98%	3,330,815	37.19%
UNP	24,798	43.84%	238,989	44.10%	4,086,026	45.62%
JVP	5,426	9.59%	61,806	11.41%	815,353	9.10%
Other Parties (with < 1%)	784	1.39%	8,188	1.51%	143,033	1.60%
Valid Votes	56,570	95.84%	541,914	95.66%	8,955,844	94.77%
Rejected Votes	2,456	4.16%	24,561	4.34%	494,009	5.23%
Total Polled	59,026	80.42%	566,475	81.09%	9,449,878	76.03%
Registered Electors	73,397		698,558		12,428,762	

=== 2000 Sri Lankan Parliamentary Election ===
Party	Akmeemana		Galle Electoral District		Sri Lanka	
Party	Votes	%	Votes	%	Votes	%
PA	28,840	52.30%	264,601	50.08%	3,899,329	45.33%
UNP	21,342	38.70%	212,055	40.14%	3,451,765	40.12%
JVP	3,925	7.12%	41,620	7.88%	518,725	6.03%
Other Parties (with < 1%)	1,039	1.88%	10,072	1.91%	250,489	2.91%
Valid Votes	55,146	N/A	528,348	N/A	8,602,617	N/A

=== 1994 Sri Lankan Parliamentary Election ===
Party	Akmeemana		Galle Electoral District		Sri Lanka	
Party	Votes	%	Votes	%	Votes	%
PA	28,027	56.08%	277,956	56.39%	3,887,805	48.94%
UNP	20,576	41.17%	203,268	41.24%	3,498,370	44.04%
MEP	704	1.41%	4,145	0.84%	68,538	0.86%
SLPF	645	1.29%	7,239	1.47%	90,078	1.13%
Other Parties (with < 1%)	23	0.05%	306	0.06%	813	0.01%
Valid Votes	49,975	96.51%	492,914	95.96%	7,943,688	95.20%
Rejected Votes	1,808	3.49%	20,763	4.04%	400,395	4.80%
Total Polled	51,783	80.51%	513,677	79.57%	8,344,095	74.75%
Registered Electors	64,320		645,559		11,163,064	

=== 1989 Sri Lankan Parliamentary Election ===
Party	Akmeemana		Galle Electoral District		Sri Lanka	
Party	Votes	%	Votes	%	Votes	%
UNP	19,615	48.69%	183,962	50.40%	2,838,005	50.71%
SLFP	19,613	48.68%	152,096	41.67%	1,785,369	31.90%
Other Parties (with < 1%)	606	1.50%	24,850	6.81%	434,479	7.76%
ELJP	452	1.12%	4,097	1.12%	67,723	1.21%
Valid Votes	40,286	95.60%	365,005	93.94%	5,596,468	93.87%
Rejected Votes	1,856	4.40%	23,536	6.06%	365,563	6.13%
Total Polled	42,142	74.71%	388,541	68.03%	5,962,031	63.60%
Registered Electors	56,408		571,146		9,374,164	

== Demographics ==
=== Ethnicity ===
The Akmeemana Polling Division has a Sinhalese majority (96.3%) . In comparison, the Galle Electoral District (which contains the Akmeemana Polling Division) has a Sinhalese majority (94.4%)

Ethnicity in Akmeemana
1. Sinhalese (96.3%)
2. Moor (2.50%)
3. Other (1.10%)

=== Religion ===
The Akmeemana Polling Division has a Buddhist majority (95.6%) . In comparison, the Galle Electoral District (which contains the Akmeemana Polling Division) has a Buddhist majority (93.9%)

Religion in Akmeemana
1. Buddhist (95.6%)
2. Muslim (2.60%)
3. Other (1.80%)
