= Balapitiya Polling Division =

Balapitiya
- Polling Division
- Coordinates: 6.304866°N 80.046444°E
- Country: Sri Lanka
- Province: Southern Province, Sri Lanka
- Electoral District: Galle Electoral District

Area
  - Total: 55.93 km^{2} (21.59 sq mi)

Population (2012)
  - Total: 67,432
  - Density: 1,206/km^{2} (3,120/sq mi)
- ISO 3166 code: EC-07A

The Balapitiya Polling Division is a Polling Division in the Galle Electoral District, in the Southern Province, Sri Lanka.

== Presidential Election Results ==
=== Summary ===
The winner of Balapitiya has matched the final country result 7 out of 8 times. Hence, Balapitiya is a Bellwether for Presidential Elections.

Year	Balapitiya	Galle Electoral District	MAE %	Sri Lanka	MAE %
2019	SLPP	SLPP	1.36%	SLPP	12.50%
2015	UPFA	UPFA	2.74%	NDF	10.62%
2010	UPFA	UPFA	1.25%	UPFA	6.75%
2005	UPFA	UPFA	1.84%	UPFA	6.20%
1999	PA	PA	1.82%	PA	2.03%
1994	PA	PA	3.20%	PA	4.23%
1988	UNP	SLFP	13.11%	UNP	6.08%
1982	UNP	UNP	5.73%	UNP	2.98%
Matches/Mean MAE	7/8	6/8	3.88%	8/8	6.42%

=== 2019 Sri Lankan Presidential Election ===
Party	Balapitiya		Galle Electoral District		Sri Lanka	
Party	Votes	%	Votes	%	Votes	%
SLPP	28,185	66.07%	466,148	64.26%	6,924,255	52.25%
NDF	12,567	29.46%	217,401	29.97%	5,564,239	41.99%
NMPP	1,127	2.64%	27,006	3.72%	418,553	3.16%
Other Parties (with < 1%)	779	1.83%	14,803	2.04%	345,452	2.61%
Valid Votes	42,658	99.29%	725,358	99.20%	13,252,499	98.99%
Rejected Votes	306	0.71%	5,878	0.80%	135,452	1.01%
Total Polled	42,964	81.30%	731,236	85.15%	13,387,951	83.71%
Registered Electors	52,844		858,749		15,992,568	

=== 2015 Sri Lankan Presidential Election ===
Party	Balapitiya		Galle Electoral District		Sri Lanka	
Party	Votes	%	Votes	%	Votes	%
UPFA	23,283	58.45%	377,126	55.64%	5,768,090	47.58%
NDF	16,196	40.66%	293,994	43.37%	6,217,162	51.28%
Other Parties (with < 1%)	352	0.88%	6,691	0.99%	138,200	1.14%
Valid Votes	39,831	99.04%	677,811	99.05%	12,123,452	98.85%
Rejected Votes	388	0.96%	6,516	0.95%	140,925	1.15%
Total Polled	40,219	76.10%	684,327	80.46%	12,264,377	78.69%
Registered Electors	52,852		850,549		15,585,942	

=== 2010 Sri Lankan Presidential Election ===
Party	Balapitiya		Galle Electoral District		Sri Lanka	
Party	Votes	%	Votes	%	Votes	%
UPFA	23,634	64.93%	386,971	63.69%	6,015,934	57.88%
NDF	12,198	33.51%	211,633	34.83%	4,173,185	40.15%
Other Parties (with < 1%)	569	1.56%	9,017	1.48%	204,494	1.97%
Valid Votes	36,401	99.34%	607,621	99.38%	10,393,613	99.03%
Rejected Votes	241	0.66%	3,765	0.62%	101,838	0.97%
Total Polled	36,642	73.12%	611,386	77.82%	10,495,451	66.70%
Registered Electors	50,109		785,663		15,734,587	

=== 2005 Sri Lankan Presidential Election ===
Party	Balapitiya		Galle Electoral District		Sri Lanka	
Party	Votes	%	Votes	%	Votes	%
UPFA	20,743	56.59%	347,233	58.41%	4,887,152	50.29%
UNP	15,460	42.18%	239,320	40.26%	4,706,366	48.43%
Other Parties (with < 1%)	449	1.23%	7,915	1.33%	123,521	1.27%
Valid Votes	36,652	99.21%	594,468	99.08%	9,717,039	98.88%
Rejected Votes	291	0.79%	5,540	0.92%	109,869	1.12%
Total Polled	36,943	75.66%	600,008	79.86%	9,826,908	69.51%
Registered Electors	48,826		751,327		14,136,979	

=== 1999 Sri Lankan Presidential Election ===
Party	Balapitiya		Galle Electoral District		Sri Lanka	
Party	Votes	%	Votes	%	Votes	%
PA	17,524	53.43%	281,154	54.91%	4,312,157	51.12%
UNP	13,372	40.77%	195,906	38.26%	3,602,748	42.71%
JVP	1,466	4.47%	27,257	5.32%	343,927	4.08%
Other Parties (with < 1%)	438	1.34%	7,702	1.50%	176,679	2.09%
Valid Votes	32,800	98.38%	512,019	98.14%	8,435,754	97.69%
Rejected Votes	539	1.62%	9,716	1.86%	199,536	2.31%
Total Polled	33,339	72.81%	521,735	77.43%	8,635,290	72.17%
Registered Electors	45,790		673,785		11,965,536	

=== 1994 Sri Lankan Presidential Election ===
Party	Balapitiya		Galle Electoral District		Sri Lanka	
Party	Votes	%	Votes	%	Votes	%
PA	17,307	58.25%	285,398	61.40%	4,709,205	62.28%
UNP	12,087	40.68%	173,282	37.28%	2,715,283	35.91%
Other Parties (with < 1%)	320	1.08%	6,135	1.32%	137,040	1.81%
Valid Votes	29,714	98.75%	464,815	98.49%	7,561,526	98.03%
Rejected Votes	375	1.25%	7,112	1.51%	151,706	1.97%
Total Polled	30,089	68.40%	471,927	73.01%	7,713,232	69.12%
Registered Electors	43,988		646,373		11,158,880	

=== 1988 Sri Lankan Presidential Election ===
Party	Balapitiya		Galle Electoral District		Sri Lanka	
Party	Votes	%	Votes	%	Votes	%
UNP	5,093	57.08%	124,912	44.62%	2,569,199	50.43%
SLFP	3,475	38.95%	148,615	53.09%	2,289,857	44.95%
SLMP	354	3.97%	6,417	2.29%	235,701	4.63%
Valid Votes	8,922	98.22%	279,944	98.43%	5,094,754	98.24%
Rejected Votes	162	1.78%	4,461	1.57%	91,499	1.76%
Total Polled	9,084	22.04%	284,405	49.34%	5,186,256	55.87%
Registered Electors	41,220		576,390		9,283,143	

=== 1982 Sri Lankan Presidential Election ===
Party	Balapitiya		Galle Electoral District		Sri Lanka	
Party	Votes	%	Votes	%	Votes	%
UNP	14,949	52.38%	211,544	50.23%	3,450,815	52.93%
SLFP	9,295	32.57%	180,925	42.96%	2,546,348	39.05%
LSSP	3,060	10.72%	6,391	1.52%	58,531	0.90%
JVP	1,178	4.13%	20,962	4.98%	273,428	4.19%
Other Parties (with < 1%)	59	0.21%	1,316	0.31%	190,929	2.93%
Valid Votes	28,541	98.12%	421,138	98.78%	6,520,156	98.78%
Rejected Votes	546	1.88%	5,198	1.22%	80,470	1.22%
Total Polled	29,087	77.68%	426,336	81.84%	6,600,626	80.15%
Registered Electors	37,444		520,909		8,235,358	

== Parliamentary Election Results ==
=== Summary ===
The winner of Balapitiya has matched the final country result 6 out of 7 times. Hence, Balapitiya is a Strong Bellwether for Parliamentary Elections.

Year	Balapitiya	Galle Electoral District	MAE %	Sri Lanka	MAE %
2015	UPFA	UPFA	1.22%	UNP	6.00%
2010	UPFA	UPFA	1.11%	UPFA	3.49%
2004	UPFA	UPFA	3.31%	UPFA	4.51%
2001	UNP	UNP	2.14%	UNP	1.90%
2000	PA	PA	2.95%	PA	2.25%
1994	PA	PA	3.24%	PA	2.58%
1989	UNP	UNP	13.14%	UNP	7.12%
Matches/Mean MAE	6/7	6/7	3.87%	7/7	3.98%

=== 2015 Sri Lankan Parliamentary Election ===
Party	Balapitiya		Galle Electoral District		Sri Lanka	
Party	Votes	%	Votes	%	Votes	%
UPFA	18,237	50.59%	312,518	50.07%	4,732,664	42.48%
UNP	14,524	40.29%	265,180	42.49%	5,098,916	45.77%
JVP	2,099	5.82%	37,778	6.05%	544,154	4.88%
BJP	867	2.41%	3,041	0.49%	20,377	0.18%
Other Parties (with < 1%)	322	0.89%	5,618	0.90%	62,475	0.56%
Valid Votes	36,049	97.27%	624,135	97.63%	11,140,333	95.35%
Rejected Votes	1,002	2.70%	15,107	2.36%	516,926	4.42%
Total Polled	37,061	70.12%	639,318	78.00%	11,684,111	77.66%
Registered Electors	52,852		819,666		15,044,490	

=== 2010 Sri Lankan Parliamentary Election ===
Party	Balapitiya		Galle Electoral District		Sri Lanka	
Party	Votes	%	Votes	%	Votes	%
UPFA	17,374	65.01%	305,307	66.17%	4,846,388	60.38%
UNP	7,295	27.30%	120,101	26.03%	2,357,057	29.37%
DNA	1,899	7.11%	33,663	7.30%	441,251	5.50%
Other Parties (with < 1%)	158	0.59%	2,317	0.50%	32,313	0.40%
Valid Votes	26,726	95.44%	461,388	95.05%	8,026,322	96.03%
Rejected Votes	1,277	4.56%	24,013	4.95%	581,465	6.96%
Total Polled	28,003	55.88%	485,401	61.67%	8,358,246	59.29%
Registered Electors	50,109		787,139		14,097,690	

=== 2004 Sri Lankan Parliamentary Election ===
Party	Balapitiya		Galle Electoral District		Sri Lanka	
Party	Votes	%	Votes	%	Votes	%
UPFA	18,002	52.61%	306,385	56.58%	4,223,126	45.70%
UNP	14,117	41.26%	209,399	38.67%	3,486,792	37.73%
JHU	1,944	5.68%	22,826	4.22%	552,723	5.98%
Other Parties (with < 1%)	154	0.45%	2,901	0.54%	60,066	0.65%
Valid Votes	34,217	95.83%	541,511	94.69%	9,241,931	94.52%
Rejected Votes	1,489	4.17%	30,380	5.31%	534,452	5.47%
Total Polled	35,706	73.79%	571,891	79.81%	9,777,821	75.74%
Registered Electors	48,387		716,609		12,909,631	

=== 2001 Sri Lankan Parliamentary Election ===
Party	Balapitiya		Galle Electoral District		Sri Lanka	
Party	Votes	%	Votes	%	Votes	%
UNP	16,030	46.59%	238,989	44.10%	4,086,026	45.62%
PA	13,956	40.56%	232,931	42.98%	3,330,815	37.19%
JVP	3,930	11.42%	61,806	11.41%	815,353	9.10%
Other Parties (with < 1%)	494	1.44%	8,188	1.51%	143,033	1.60%
Valid Votes	34,410	96.02%	541,914	95.66%	8,955,844	94.77%
Rejected Votes	1,426	3.98%	24,561	4.34%	494,009	5.23%
Total Polled	35,836	75.01%	566,475	81.09%	9,449,878	76.03%
Registered Electors	47,774		698,558		12,428,762	

=== 2000 Sri Lankan Parliamentary Election ===
Party	Balapitiya		Galle Electoral District		Sri Lanka	
Party	Votes	%	Votes	%	Votes	%
PA	15,755	47.05%	264,601	50.08%	3,899,329	45.33%
UNP	14,594	43.58%	212,055	40.14%	3,451,765	40.12%
JVP	2,417	7.22%	41,620	7.88%	518,725	6.03%
Other Parties (with < 1%)	720	2.15%	10,072	1.91%	250,489	2.91%
Valid Votes	33,486	N/A	528,348	N/A	8,602,617	N/A

=== 1994 Sri Lankan Parliamentary Election ===
Party	Balapitiya		Galle Electoral District		Sri Lanka	
Party	Votes	%	Votes	%	Votes	%
PA	16,907	53.37%	277,956	56.39%	3,887,805	48.94%
UNP	14,239	44.95%	203,268	41.24%	3,498,370	44.04%
SLPF	421	1.33%	7,239	1.47%	90,078	1.13%
Other Parties (with < 1%)	111	0.35%	4,451	0.90%	69,351	0.87%
Valid Votes	31,678	95.83%	492,914	95.96%	7,943,688	95.20%
Rejected Votes	1,380	4.17%	20,763	4.04%	400,395	4.80%
Total Polled	33,058	75.15%	513,677	79.57%	8,344,095	74.75%
Registered Electors	43,988		645,559		11,163,064	

=== 1989 Sri Lankan Parliamentary Election ===
Party	Balapitiya		Galle Electoral District		Sri Lanka	
Party	Votes	%	Votes	%	Votes	%
UNP	13,052	53.97%	183,962	50.40%	2,838,005	50.71%
USA	6,475	26.77%	18,160	4.98%	141,983	2.54%
SLFP	4,130	17.08%	152,096	41.67%	1,785,369	31.90%
Other Parties (with < 1%)	527	2.18%	10,787	2.96%	360,219	6.44%
Valid Votes	24,184	91.69%	365,005	93.94%	5,596,468	93.87%
Rejected Votes	2,191	8.31%	23,536	6.06%	365,563	6.13%
Total Polled	26,375	65.37%	388,541	68.03%	5,962,031	63.60%
Registered Electors	40,345		571,146		9,374,164	

== Demographics ==
=== Ethnicity ===
The Balapitiya Polling Division has a Sinhalese majority (98.1%) . In comparison, the Galle Electoral District (which contains the Balapitiya Polling Division) has a Sinhalese majority (94.4%)

Ethnicity in Balapitiya
1. Sinhalese (98.1%)
2. Moor (1.60%)
3. Other (0.20%)

=== Religion ===
The Balapitiya Polling Division has a Buddhist majority (97.9%) . In comparison, the Galle Electoral District (which contains the Balapitiya Polling Division) has a Buddhist majority (93.9%)

Religion in Balapitiya
1. Buddhist (97.9%)
2. Muslim (1.70%)
3. Other (0.40%)
