= Gunaratna Weerakoon =

Sri Lankan teacher and politician (1947–2021)

Hon. Gunaratna Weerakoon MP
- ගුණරත්න වීරකෝන් குணரத்ன வீரகோன்

Deputy Minister of Regional Infrastructure Development
- In office 2004–2007

Non-Cabinet Minister of Nation Building
- In office 2007–2010

Deputy Minister of National Heritage & Cultural Affairs
- In office 2010 – 12 January 2015

Member of Parliament for Galle District
- In office 2004–2015

Personal details
- Born: 10 November 1947 Hipankanda, Galle District, Ceylon
- Died: 24 December 2021 (aged 74) Colombo, Sri Lanka
- Party: Sri Lanka Freedom Party
- Other political affiliations: United People's Freedom Alliance
- Education: Karandeniya Central School; University of Sri Jayewardenepura
- Profession: Teacher
- Website: mhgweerakoon.com

Muhudugama Hewage Gunaratna Weerakoon (10 November 1947 – 24 December 2021) was a Sri Lankan teacher and politician.

He was a member of the Parliament of Sri Lanka and a government minister. He died on 24 December 2021, at the age of 74.

== Sources ==
- "GUNARATNE WEERAKOON". Directory of Members. Parliament of Sri Lanka. Archived from the original on 2010-10-06.
