= Baddegama Polling Division =

Baddegama
- Polling Division
- Coordinates: 6.154981°N 80.285886°E
- Country: Sri Lanka
- Province: Southern Province, Sri Lanka
- Electoral District: Galle Electoral District

Area
  - Total: 411.58 km^{2} (158.91 sq mi)

Population (2012)
  - Total: 174,783
  - Density: 425/km^{2} (1,100/sq mi)
- ISO 3166 code: EC-07F

The Baddegama Polling Division is a Polling Division in the Galle Electoral District, in the Southern Province, Sri Lanka.

== Presidential Election Results ==
=== Summary ===
The winner of Baddegama has matched the final country result 5 out of 8 times. Hence, Baddegama is a Weak Bellwether for Presidential Elections.

Year	Baddegama	Galle Electoral District	MAE %	Sri Lanka	MAE %
2019	SLPP	SLPP	0.67%	SLPP	10.67%
2015	UPFA	UPFA	1.03%	NDF	8.94%
2010	UPFA	UPFA	0.27%	UPFA	5.29%
2005	UPFA	UPFA	0.18%	UPFA	8.16%
1999	PA	PA	0.98%	PA	4.71%
1994	PA	PA	0.22%	PA	1.26%
1988	SLFP	SLFP	2.65%	UNP	9.26%
1982	SLFP	UNP	4.72%	UNP	7.58%
Matches/Mean MAE	5/8	6/8	1.34%	8/8	6.98%

=== 2019 Sri Lankan Presidential Election ===
Party	Baddegama		Galle Electoral District		Sri Lanka	
Party	Votes	%	Votes	%	Votes	%
SLPP	51,698	63.56%	466,148	64.26%	6,924,255	52.25%
NDF	24,945	30.67%	217,401	29.97%	5,564,239	41.99%
NMPP	2,811	3.46%	27,006	3.72%	418,553	3.16%
Other Parties (with < 1%)	1,880	2.31%	14,803	2.04%	345,452	2.61%
Valid Votes	81,334	99.20%	725,358	99.20%	13,252,499	98.99%
Rejected Votes	657	0.80%	5,878	0.80%	135,452	1.01%
Total Polled	81,991	85.85%	731,236	85.15%	13,387,951	83.71%
Registered Electors	95,503		858,749		15,992,568	

=== 2015 Sri Lankan Presidential Election ===
Party	Baddegama		Galle Electoral District		Sri Lanka	
Party	Votes	%	Votes	%	Votes	%
UPFA	43,369	56.57%	377,126	55.64%	5,768,090	47.58%
NDF	32,347	42.19%	293,994	43.37%	6,217,162	51.28%
Other Parties (with < 1%)	951	1.24%	6,691	0.99%	138,200	1.14%
Valid Votes	76,667	98.79%	677,811	99.05%	12,123,452	98.85%
Rejected Votes	941	1.21%	6,516	0.95%	140,925	1.15%
Total Polled	77,608	81.15%	684,327	80.46%	12,264,377	78.69%
Registered Electors	95,641		850,549		15,585,942	

=== 2010 Sri Lankan Presidential Election ===
Party	Baddegama		Galle Electoral District		Sri Lanka	
Party	Votes	%	Votes	%	Votes	%
UPFA	44,495	63.29%	386,971	63.69%	6,015,934	57.88%
NDF	24,446	34.77%	211,633	34.83%	4,173,185	40.15%
Other Parties (with < 1%)	1,361	1.94%	9,017	1.48%	204,494	1.97%
Valid Votes	70,302	99.31%	607,621	99.38%	10,393,613	99.03%
Rejected Votes	489	0.69%	3,765	0.62%	101,838	0.97%
Total Polled	70,791	78.83%	611,386	77.82%	10,495,451	66.70%
Registered Electors	89,805		785,663		15,734,587	

=== 2005 Sri Lankan Presidential Election ===
Party	Baddegama		Galle Electoral District		Sri Lanka	
Party	Votes	%	Votes	%	Votes	%
UPFA	40,558	58.33%	347,233	58.41%	4,887,152	50.29%
UNP	27,764	39.93%	239,320	40.26%	4,706,366	48.43%
Other Parties (with < 1%)	1,208	1.74%	7,915	1.33%	123,521	1.27%
Valid Votes	69,530	99.00%	594,468	99.08%	9,717,039	98.88%
Rejected Votes	699	1.00%	5,540	0.92%	109,869	1.12%
Total Polled	70,229	81.87%	600,008	79.86%	9,826,908	69.51%
Registered Electors	85,786		751,327		14,136,979	

=== 1999 Sri Lankan Presidential Election ===
Party	Baddegama		Galle Electoral District		Sri Lanka	
Party	Votes	%	Votes	%	Votes	%
PA	34,097	56.36%	281,154	54.91%	4,312,157	51.12%
UNP	22,969	37.97%	195,906	38.26%	3,602,748	42.71%
JVP	2,406	3.98%	27,257	5.32%	343,927	4.08%
Other Parties (with < 1%)	1,024	1.69%	7,702	1.50%	176,679	2.09%
Valid Votes	60,496	98.14%	512,019	98.14%	8,435,754	97.69%
Rejected Votes	1,145	1.86%	9,716	1.86%	199,536	2.31%
Total Polled	61,641	80.20%	521,735	77.43%	8,635,290	72.17%
Registered Electors	76,860		673,785		11,965,536	

=== 1994 Sri Lankan Presidential Election ===
Party	Baddegama		Galle Electoral District		Sri Lanka	
Party	Votes	%	Votes	%	Votes	%
PA	33,932	61.16%	285,398	61.40%	4,709,205	62.28%
UNP	20,785	37.46%	173,282	37.28%	2,715,283	35.91%
Other Parties (with < 1%)	762	1.37%	6,135	1.32%	137,040	1.81%
Valid Votes	55,479	98.31%	464,815	98.49%	7,561,526	98.03%
Rejected Votes	952	1.69%	7,112	1.51%	151,706	1.97%
Total Polled	56,431	75.92%	471,927	73.01%	7,713,232	69.12%
Registered Electors	74,331		646,373		11,158,880	

=== 1988 Sri Lankan Presidential Election ===
Party	Baddegama		Galle Electoral District		Sri Lanka	
Party	Votes	%	Votes	%	Votes	%
SLFP	27,061	55.95%	148,615	53.09%	2,289,857	44.95%
UNP	20,368	42.11%	124,912	44.62%	2,569,199	50.43%
SLMP	941	1.95%	6,417	2.29%	235,701	4.63%
Valid Votes	48,370	98.39%	279,944	98.43%	5,094,754	98.24%
Rejected Votes	793	1.61%	4,461	1.57%	91,499	1.76%
Total Polled	49,163	75.23%	284,405	49.34%	5,186,256	55.87%
Registered Electors	65,351		576,390		9,283,143	

=== 1982 Sri Lankan Presidential Election ===
Party	Baddegama		Galle Electoral District		Sri Lanka	
Party	Votes	%	Votes	%	Votes	%
SLFP	23,689	48.78%	180,925	42.96%	2,546,348	39.05%
UNP	22,301	45.92%	211,544	50.23%	3,450,815	52.93%
JVP	1,981	4.08%	20,962	4.98%	273,428	4.19%
Other Parties (with < 1%)	589	1.21%	7,707	1.83%	249,460	3.83%
Valid Votes	48,560	98.90%	421,138	98.78%	6,520,156	98.78%
Rejected Votes	540	1.10%	5,198	1.22%	80,470	1.22%
Total Polled	49,100	83.16%	426,336	81.84%	6,600,626	80.15%
Registered Electors	59,040		520,909		8,235,358	

== Parliamentary Election Results ==
=== Summary ===
The winner of Baddegama has matched the final country result 5 out of 7 times. Hence, Baddegama is a Weak Bellwether for Parliamentary Elections.

Year	Baddegama	Galle Electoral District	MAE %	Sri Lanka	MAE %
2015	UPFA	UPFA	0.98%	UNP	5.36%
2010	UPFA	UPFA	1.30%	UPFA	5.17%
2004	UPFA	UPFA	0.95%	UPFA	6.31%
2001	PA	UNP	1.35%	UNP	3.81%
2000	PA	PA	1.88%	PA	3.84%
1994	PA	PA	0.77%	PA	5.57%
1989	UNP	UNP	2.78%	UNP	5.21%
Matches/Mean MAE	5/7	6/7	1.43%	7/7	5.04%

=== 2015 Sri Lankan Parliamentary Election ===
Party	Baddegama		Galle Electoral District		Sri Lanka	
Party	Votes	%	Votes	%	Votes	%
UPFA	36,425	51.74%	312,518	50.07%	4,732,664	42.48%
UNP	30,029	42.66%	265,180	42.49%	5,098,916	45.77%
JVP	3,406	4.84%	37,778	6.05%	544,154	4.88%
Other Parties (with < 1%)	537	0.76%	8,659	1.39%	82,852	0.74%
Valid Votes	70,397	97.14%	624,135	97.63%	11,140,333	95.35%
Rejected Votes	2,065	2.85%	15,107	2.36%	516,926	4.42%
Total Polled	72,471	75.77%	639,318	78.00%	11,684,111	77.66%
Registered Electors	95,641		819,666		15,044,490	

=== 2010 Sri Lankan Parliamentary Election ===
Party	Baddegama		Galle Electoral District		Sri Lanka	
Party	Votes	%	Votes	%	Votes	%
UPFA	35,733	67.62%	305,307	66.17%	4,846,388	60.38%
UNP	14,119	26.72%	120,101	26.03%	2,357,057	29.37%
DNA	2,696	5.10%	33,663	7.30%	441,251	5.50%
Other Parties (with < 1%)	292	0.55%	2,317	0.50%	32,313	0.40%
Valid Votes	52,840	93.66%	461,388	95.05%	8,026,322	96.03%
Rejected Votes	3,577	6.34%	24,013	4.95%	581,465	6.96%
Total Polled	56,417	62.82%	485,401	61.67%	8,358,246	59.29%
Registered Electors	89,805		787,139		14,097,690	

=== 2004 Sri Lankan Parliamentary Election ===
Party	Baddegama		Galle Electoral District		Sri Lanka	
Party	Votes	%	Votes	%	Votes	%
UPFA	35,936	57.62%	306,385	56.58%	4,223,126	45.70%
UNP	24,572	39.40%	209,399	38.67%	3,486,792	37.73%
JHU	1,368	2.19%	22,826	4.22%	552,723	5.98%
Other Parties (with < 1%)	493	0.79%	2,901	0.54%	60,066	0.65%
Valid Votes	62,369	92.95%	541,511	94.69%	9,241,931	94.52%
Rejected Votes	4,727	7.05%	30,380	5.31%	534,452	5.47%
Total Polled	67,096	80.47%	571,891	79.81%	9,777,821	75.74%
Registered Electors	83,381		716,609		12,909,631	

=== 2001 Sri Lankan Parliamentary Election ===
Party	Baddegama		Galle Electoral District		Sri Lanka	
Party	Votes	%	Votes	%	Votes	%
PA	28,326	45.32%	232,931	42.98%	3,330,815	37.19%
UNP	27,446	43.92%	238,989	44.10%	4,086,026	45.62%
JVP	5,714	9.14%	61,806	11.41%	815,353	9.10%
Other Parties (with < 1%)	1,011	1.62%	8,188	1.51%	143,033	1.60%
Valid Votes	62,497	94.09%	541,914	95.66%	8,955,844	94.77%
Rejected Votes	3,928	5.91%	24,561	4.34%	494,009	5.23%
Total Polled	66,425	81.98%	566,475	81.09%	9,449,878	76.03%
Registered Electors	81,026		698,558		12,428,762	

=== 2000 Sri Lankan Parliamentary Election ===
Party	Baddegama		Galle Electoral District		Sri Lanka	
Party	Votes	%	Votes	%	Votes	%
PA	31,845	52.64%	264,601	50.08%	3,899,329	45.33%
UNP	23,548	38.93%	212,055	40.14%	3,451,765	40.12%
JVP	3,937	6.51%	41,620	7.88%	518,725	6.03%
Other Parties (with < 1%)	1,161	1.92%	10,072	1.91%	250,489	2.91%
Valid Votes	60,491	N/A	528,348	N/A	8,602,617	N/A

=== 1994 Sri Lankan Parliamentary Election ===
Party	Baddegama		Galle Electoral District		Sri Lanka	
Party	Votes	%	Votes	%	Votes	%
PA	33,572	57.47%	277,956	56.39%	3,887,805	48.94%
UNP	23,874	40.87%	203,268	41.24%	3,498,370	44.04%
Other Parties (with < 1%)	973	1.67%	11,690	2.37%	159,429	2.01%
Valid Votes	58,419	95.21%	492,914	95.96%	7,943,688	95.20%
Rejected Votes	2,937	4.79%	20,763	4.04%	400,395	4.80%
Total Polled	61,356	82.54%	513,677	79.57%	8,344,095	74.75%
Registered Electors	74,331		645,559		11,163,064	

=== 1989 Sri Lankan Parliamentary Election ===
Party	Baddegama		Galle Electoral District		Sri Lanka	
Party	Votes	%	Votes	%	Votes	%
UNP	23,790	50.64%	183,962	50.40%	2,838,005	50.71%
SLFP	22,325	47.52%	152,096	41.67%	1,785,369	31.90%
Other Parties (with < 1%)	864	1.84%	28,947	7.93%	502,202	8.97%
Valid Votes	46,979	94.56%	365,005	93.94%	5,596,468	93.87%
Rejected Votes	2,705	5.44%	23,536	6.06%	365,563	6.13%
Total Polled	49,684	77.16%	388,541	68.03%	5,962,031	63.60%
Registered Electors	64,390		571,146		9,374,164	

== Demographics ==
=== Ethnicity ===
The Baddegama Polling Division has a Sinhalese majority (94.5%) . In comparison, the Galle Electoral District (which contains the Baddegama Polling Division) has a Sinhalese majority (94.4%)

Ethnicity in Baddegama
1. Sinhalese (94.5%)
2. Sri Lankan Tamil (3.30%)
3. Indian Tamil (2.20%)
4. Other (0.00%)

=== Religion ===
The Baddegama Polling Division has a Buddhist majority (94.1%) . In comparison, the Galle Electoral District (which contains the Baddegama Polling Division) has a Buddhist majority (93.9%)

Religion in Baddegama
1. Buddhist (94.1%)
2. Hindu (4.40%)
3. Other (1.50%)
