= Karandeniya Polling Division =

Karandeniya
- Polling Division
- Coordinates: 6.257410°N 80.139707°E
- Country: Sri Lanka
- Province: Southern Province, Sri Lanka
- Electoral District: Galle Electoral District

Area
  - Total: 151.94 km^{2} (58.66 sq mi)

Population (2012)
  - Total: 91,845
  - Density: 604/km^{2} (1,560/sq mi)
- ISO 3166 code: EC-07C

The Karandeniya Polling Division is a Polling Division in the Galle Electoral District, in the Southern Province, Sri Lanka.

== Presidential Election Results ==
=== Summary ===
The winner of Karandeniya has matched the final country result 6 out of 8 times. Hence, Karandeniya is a Weak Bellwether for Presidential Elections.

Year	Karandeniya	Galle Electoral District	MAE %	Sri Lanka	MAE %
2019	SLPP	SLPP	5.73%	SLPP	17.09%
2015	UPFA	UPFA	7.52%	NDF	15.42%
2010	UPFA	UPFA	7.26%	UPFA	12.73%
2005	UPFA	UPFA	4.79%	UPFA	12.83%
1999	PA	PA	1.11%	PA	4.70%
1994	PA	PA	2.89%	PA	1.83%
1988	SLFP	SLFP	3.11%	UNP	9.71%
1982	UNP	UNP	2.82%	UNP	1.22%
Matches/Mean MAE	6/8	6/8	4.40%	8/8	9.44%

=== 2019 Sri Lankan Presidential Election ===
Party	Karandeniya		Galle Electoral District		Sri Lanka	
Party	Votes	%	Votes	%	Votes	%
SLPP	42,664	70.29%	466,148	64.26%	6,924,255	52.25%
NDF	14,437	23.79%	217,401	29.97%	5,564,239	41.99%
NMPP	2,199	3.62%	27,006	3.72%	418,553	3.16%
Other Parties (with < 1%)	1,393	2.30%	14,803	2.04%	345,452	2.61%
Valid Votes	60,693	99.32%	725,358	99.20%	13,252,499	98.99%
Rejected Votes	415	0.68%	5,878	0.80%	135,452	1.01%
Total Polled	61,108	82.60%	731,236	85.15%	13,387,951	83.71%
Registered Electors	73,981		858,749		15,992,568	

=== 2015 Sri Lankan Presidential Election ===
Party	Karandeniya		Galle Electoral District		Sri Lanka	
Party	Votes	%	Votes	%	Votes	%
UPFA	34,983	63.13%	377,126	55.64%	5,768,090	47.58%
NDF	19,752	35.65%	293,994	43.37%	6,217,162	51.28%
Other Parties (with < 1%)	675	1.22%	6,691	0.99%	138,200	1.14%
Valid Votes	55,410	99.03%	677,811	99.05%	12,123,452	98.85%
Rejected Votes	541	0.97%	6,516	0.95%	140,925	1.15%
Total Polled	55,951	77.10%	684,327	80.46%	12,264,377	78.69%
Registered Electors	72,572		850,549		15,585,942	

=== 2010 Sri Lankan Presidential Election ===
Party	Karandeniya		Galle Electoral District		Sri Lanka	
Party	Votes	%	Votes	%	Votes	%
UPFA	34,809	71.00%	386,971	63.69%	6,015,934	57.88%
NDF	13,420	27.37%	211,633	34.83%	4,173,185	40.15%
Other Parties (with < 1%)	795	1.62%	9,017	1.48%	204,494	1.97%
Valid Votes	49,024	99.38%	607,621	99.38%	10,393,613	99.03%
Rejected Votes	308	0.62%	3,765	0.62%	101,838	0.97%
Total Polled	49,332	73.60%	611,386	77.82%	10,495,451	66.70%
Registered Electors	67,025		785,663		15,734,587	

=== 2005 Sri Lankan Presidential Election ===
Party	Karandeniya		Galle Electoral District		Sri Lanka	
Party	Votes	%	Votes	%	Votes	%
UPFA	31,157	63.26%	347,233	58.41%	4,887,152	50.29%
UNP	17,438	35.40%	239,320	40.26%	4,706,366	48.43%
Other Parties (with < 1%)	658	1.34%	7,915	1.33%	123,521	1.27%
Valid Votes	49,253	99.03%	594,468	99.08%	9,717,039	98.88%
Rejected Votes	481	0.97%	5,540	0.92%	109,869	1.12%
Total Polled	49,734	77.57%	600,008	79.86%	9,826,908	69.51%
Registered Electors	64,111		751,327		14,136,979	

=== 1999 Sri Lankan Presidential Election ===
Party	Karandeniya		Galle Electoral District		Sri Lanka	
Party	Votes	%	Votes	%	Votes	%
PA	22,445	54.57%	281,154	54.91%	4,312,157	51.12%
UNP	14,882	36.18%	195,906	38.26%	3,602,748	42.71%
JVP	3,157	7.68%	27,257	5.32%	343,927	4.08%
Other Parties (with < 1%)	649	1.58%	7,702	1.50%	176,679	2.09%
Valid Votes	41,133	97.96%	512,019	98.14%	8,435,754	97.69%
Rejected Votes	857	2.04%	9,716	1.86%	199,536	2.31%
Total Polled	41,990	74.32%	521,735	77.43%	8,635,290	72.17%
Registered Electors	56,502		673,785		11,965,536	

=== 1994 Sri Lankan Presidential Election ===
Party	Karandeniya		Galle Electoral District		Sri Lanka	
Party	Votes	%	Votes	%	Votes	%
PA	22,470	64.15%	285,398	61.40%	4,709,205	62.28%
UNP	11,934	34.07%	173,282	37.28%	2,715,283	35.91%
Other Parties (with < 1%)	625	1.78%	6,135	1.32%	137,040	1.81%
Valid Votes	35,029	98.36%	464,815	98.49%	7,561,526	98.03%
Rejected Votes	583	1.64%	7,112	1.51%	151,706	1.97%
Total Polled	35,612	67.11%	471,927	73.01%	7,713,232	69.12%
Registered Electors	53,066		646,373		11,158,880	

=== 1988 Sri Lankan Presidential Election ===
Party	Karandeniya		Galle Electoral District		Sri Lanka	
Party	Votes	%	Votes	%	Votes	%
SLFP	5,703	56.45%	148,615	53.09%	2,289,857	44.95%
UNP	4,210	41.67%	124,912	44.62%	2,569,199	50.43%
SLMP	189	1.87%	6,417	2.29%	235,701	4.63%
Valid Votes	10,102	98.53%	279,944	98.43%	5,094,754	98.24%
Rejected Votes	151	1.47%	4,461	1.57%	91,499	1.76%
Total Polled	10,253	21.41%	284,405	49.34%	5,186,256	55.87%
Registered Electors	47,887		576,390		9,283,143	

=== 1982 Sri Lankan Presidential Election ===
Party	Karandeniya		Galle Electoral District		Sri Lanka	
Party	Votes	%	Votes	%	Votes	%
UNP	17,060	51.57%	211,544	50.23%	3,450,815	52.93%
SLFP	12,732	38.48%	180,925	42.96%	2,546,348	39.05%
JVP	3,026	9.15%	20,962	4.98%	273,428	4.19%
Other Parties (with < 1%)	266	0.80%	7,707	1.83%	249,460	3.83%
Valid Votes	33,084	98.90%	421,138	98.78%	6,520,156	98.78%
Rejected Votes	367	1.10%	5,198	1.22%	80,470	1.22%
Total Polled	33,451	80.89%	426,336	81.84%	6,600,626	80.15%
Registered Electors	41,355		520,909		8,235,358	

== Parliamentary Election Results ==
=== Summary ===
The winner of Karandeniya has matched the final country result 4 out of 7 times. Hence, Karandeniya is a Weak Bellwether for Parliamentary Elections.

Year	Karandeniya	Galle Electoral District	MAE %	Sri Lanka	MAE %
2015	UPFA	UPFA	4.48%	UNP	8.97%
2010	UPFA	UPFA	4.32%	UPFA	8.49%
2004	UPFA	UPFA	7.82%	UPFA	11.54%
2001	PA	UNP	1.92%	UNP	4.26%
2000	PA	PA	1.12%	PA	1.57%
1994	PA	PA	0.26%	PA	5.13%
1989	SLFP	UNP	5.98%	UNP	8.44%
Matches/Mean MAE	4/7	6/7	3.70%	7/7	6.91%

=== 2015 Sri Lankan Parliamentary Election ===
Party	Karandeniya		Galle Electoral District		Sri Lanka	
Party	Votes	%	Votes	%	Votes	%
UPFA	27,367	54.77%	312,518	50.07%	4,732,664	42.48%
UNP	18,796	37.61%	265,180	42.49%	5,098,916	45.77%
JVP	2,588	5.18%	37,778	6.05%	544,154	4.88%
BJP	803	1.61%	3,041	0.49%	20,377	0.18%
Other Parties (with < 1%)	417	0.83%	5,618	0.90%	62,475	0.56%
Valid Votes	49,971	97.64%	624,135	97.63%	11,140,333	95.35%
Rejected Votes	1,203	2.35%	15,107	2.36%	516,926	4.42%
Total Polled	51,178	70.52%	639,318	78.00%	11,684,111	77.66%
Registered Electors	72,572		819,666		15,044,490	

=== 2010 Sri Lankan Parliamentary Election ===
Party	Karandeniya		Galle Electoral District		Sri Lanka	
Party	Votes	%	Votes	%	Votes	%
UPFA	27,274	71.15%	305,307	66.17%	4,846,388	60.38%
UNP	8,688	22.67%	120,101	26.03%	2,357,057	29.37%
DNA	2,022	5.28%	33,663	7.30%	441,251	5.50%
Other Parties (with < 1%)	347	0.91%	2,317	0.50%	32,313	0.40%
Valid Votes	38,331	95.81%	461,388	95.05%	8,026,322	96.03%
Rejected Votes	1,677	4.19%	24,013	4.95%	581,465	6.96%
Total Polled	40,008	59.69%	485,401	61.67%	8,358,246	59.29%
Registered Electors	67,025		787,139		14,097,690	

=== 2004 Sri Lankan Parliamentary Election ===
Party	Karandeniya		Galle Electoral District		Sri Lanka	
Party	Votes	%	Votes	%	Votes	%
UPFA	29,807	65.42%	306,385	56.58%	4,223,126	45.70%
UNP	14,377	31.55%	209,399	38.67%	3,486,792	37.73%
JHU	1,187	2.61%	22,826	4.22%	552,723	5.98%
Other Parties (with < 1%)	195	0.43%	2,901	0.54%	60,066	0.65%
Valid Votes	45,566	94.87%	541,511	94.69%	9,241,931	94.52%
Rejected Votes	2,464	5.13%	30,380	5.31%	534,452	5.47%
Total Polled	48,030	77.24%	571,891	79.81%	9,777,821	75.74%
Registered Electors	62,180		716,609		12,909,631	

=== 2001 Sri Lankan Parliamentary Election ===
Party	Karandeniya		Galle Electoral District		Sri Lanka	
Party	Votes	%	Votes	%	Votes	%
PA	18,925	42.14%	232,931	42.98%	3,330,815	37.19%
UNP	18,632	41.49%	238,989	44.10%	4,086,026	45.62%
JVP	6,718	14.96%	61,806	11.41%	815,353	9.10%
Other Parties (with < 1%)	631	1.41%	8,188	1.51%	143,033	1.60%
Valid Votes	44,906	95.71%	541,914	95.66%	8,955,844	94.77%
Rejected Votes	2,012	4.29%	24,561	4.34%	494,009	5.23%
Total Polled	46,918	77.84%	566,475	81.09%	9,449,878	76.03%
Registered Electors	60,273		698,558		12,428,762	

=== 2000 Sri Lankan Parliamentary Election ===
Party	Karandeniya		Galle Electoral District		Sri Lanka	
Party	Votes	%	Votes	%	Votes	%
PA	21,035	48.21%	264,601	50.08%	3,899,329	45.33%
UNP	17,491	40.08%	212,055	40.14%	3,451,765	40.12%
JVP	4,334	9.93%	41,620	7.88%	518,725	6.03%
Other Parties (with < 1%)	775	1.78%	10,072	1.91%	250,489	2.91%
Valid Votes	43,635	N/A	528,348	N/A	8,602,617	N/A

=== 1994 Sri Lankan Parliamentary Election ===
Party	Karandeniya		Galle Electoral District		Sri Lanka	
Party	Votes	%	Votes	%	Votes	%
PA	21,880	56.62%	277,956	56.39%	3,887,805	48.94%
UNP	15,830	40.96%	203,268	41.24%	3,498,370	44.04%
SLPF	805	2.08%	7,239	1.47%	90,078	1.13%
Other Parties (with < 1%)	130	0.34%	4,451	0.90%	69,351	0.87%
Valid Votes	38,645	95.14%	492,914	95.96%	7,943,688	95.20%
Rejected Votes	1,975	4.86%	20,763	4.04%	400,395	4.80%
Total Polled	40,620	76.55%	513,677	79.57%	8,344,095	74.75%
Registered Electors	53,066		645,559		11,163,064	

=== 1989 Sri Lankan Parliamentary Election ===
Party	Karandeniya		Galle Electoral District		Sri Lanka	
Party	Votes	%	Votes	%	Votes	%
SLFP	10,402	50.01%	152,096	41.67%	1,785,369	31.90%
UNP	9,516	45.75%	183,962	50.40%	2,838,005	50.71%
USA	410	1.97%	18,160	4.98%	141,983	2.54%
ELJP	271	1.30%	4,097	1.12%	67,723	1.21%
Other Parties (with < 1%)	200	0.96%	6,690	1.83%	292,496	5.23%
Valid Votes	20,799	92.13%	365,005	93.94%	5,596,468	93.87%
Rejected Votes	1,777	7.87%	23,536	6.06%	365,563	6.13%
Total Polled	22,576	47.60%	388,541	68.03%	5,962,031	63.60%
Registered Electors	47,426		571,146		9,374,164	

== Demographics ==
=== Ethnicity ===
The Karandeniya Polling Division has a Sinhalese majority (97.7%) . In comparison, the Galle Electoral District (which contains the Karandeniya Polling Division) has a Sinhalese majority (94.4%)

Ethnicity in Karandeniya
1. Sinhalese (97.7%)
2. Sri Lankan Tamil (1.50%)
3. Other (0.80%)

=== Religion ===
The Karandeniya Polling Division has a Buddhist majority (97.4%) . In comparison, the Galle Electoral District (which contains the Karandeniya Polling Division) has a Buddhist majority (93.9%)

Religion in Karandeniya
1. Buddhist (97.4%)
2. Other (1.50%)
3. Hindu (1.10%)
