= Ambalangoda Polling Division =

Ambalangoda
- Polling Division
- Coordinates: 6.208642°N 80.099580°E
- Country: Sri Lanka
- Province: Southern Province, Sri Lanka
- Electoral District: Galle Electoral District

Area
  - Total: 78.58 km^{2} (30.34 sq mi)

Population (2012)
  - Total: 78,716
  - Density: 1,002/km^{2} (2,600/sq mi)
- ISO 3166 code: EC-07B

The Ambalangoda Polling Division is a Polling Division in the Galle Electoral District, in the Southern Province, Sri Lanka.

== Presidential Election Results ==
=== Summary ===
The winner of Ambalangoda has matched the final country result 6 out of 8 times. Hence, Ambalangoda is a Weak Bellwether for Presidential Elections.

Year	Ambalangoda	Galle Electoral District	MAE %	Sri Lanka	MAE %
2019	SLPP	SLPP	1.52%	SLPP	12.89%
2015	UPFA	UPFA	0.52%	NDF	7.37%
2010	UPFA	UPFA	0.97%	UPFA	4.52%
2005	UPFA	UPFA	1.03%	UPFA	9.06%
1999	PA	PA	0.98%	PA	4.89%
1994	PA	PA	2.49%	PA	1.44%
1988	SLFP	SLFP	3.07%	UNP	3.75%
1982	UNP	UNP	1.51%	UNP	4.58%
Matches/Mean MAE	6/8	6/8	1.51%	8/8	6.06%

=== 2019 Sri Lankan Presidential Election ===
Party	Ambalangoda		Galle Electoral District		Sri Lanka	
Party	Votes	%	Votes	%	Votes	%
SLPP	41,528	65.78%	466,148	64.26%	6,924,255	52.25%
NDF	17,793	28.19%	217,401	29.97%	5,564,239	41.99%
NMPP	2,480	3.93%	27,006	3.72%	418,553	3.16%
Other Parties (with < 1%)	1,328	2.10%	14,803	2.04%	345,452	2.61%
Valid Votes	63,129	99.18%	725,358	99.20%	13,252,499	98.99%
Rejected Votes	525	0.82%	5,878	0.80%	135,452	1.01%
Total Polled	63,654	84.30%	731,236	85.15%	13,387,951	83.71%
Registered Electors	75,507		858,749		15,992,568	

=== 2015 Sri Lankan Presidential Election ===
Party	Ambalangoda		Galle Electoral District		Sri Lanka	
Party	Votes	%	Votes	%	Votes	%
UPFA	32,871	55.15%	377,126	55.64%	5,768,090	47.58%
NDF	26,187	43.93%	293,994	43.37%	6,217,162	51.28%
Other Parties (with < 1%)	546	0.92%	6,691	0.99%	138,200	1.14%
Valid Votes	59,604	98.95%	677,811	99.05%	12,123,452	98.85%
Rejected Votes	635	1.05%	6,516	0.95%	140,925	1.15%
Total Polled	60,239	79.76%	684,327	80.46%	12,264,377	78.69%
Registered Electors	75,524		850,549		15,585,942	

=== 2010 Sri Lankan Presidential Election ===
Party	Ambalangoda		Galle Electoral District		Sri Lanka	
Party	Votes	%	Votes	%	Votes	%
UPFA	33,488	62.79%	386,971	63.69%	6,015,934	57.88%
NDF	19,191	35.98%	211,633	34.83%	4,173,185	40.15%
Other Parties (with < 1%)	655	1.23%	9,017	1.48%	204,494	1.97%
Valid Votes	53,334	99.40%	607,621	99.38%	10,393,613	99.03%
Rejected Votes	320	0.60%	3,765	0.62%	101,838	0.97%
Total Polled	53,654	78.01%	611,386	77.82%	10,495,451	66.70%
Registered Electors	68,780		785,663		15,734,587	

=== 2005 Sri Lankan Presidential Election ===
Party	Ambalangoda		Galle Electoral District		Sri Lanka	
Party	Votes	%	Votes	%	Votes	%
UPFA	30,418	59.51%	347,233	58.41%	4,887,152	50.29%
UNP	20,093	39.31%	239,320	40.26%	4,706,366	48.43%
Other Parties (with < 1%)	599	1.17%	7,915	1.33%	123,521	1.27%
Valid Votes	51,110	99.01%	594,468	99.08%	9,717,039	98.88%
Rejected Votes	509	0.99%	5,540	0.92%	109,869	1.12%
Total Polled	51,619	79.58%	600,008	79.86%	9,826,908	69.51%
Registered Electors	64,864		751,327		14,136,979	

=== 1999 Sri Lankan Presidential Election ===
Party	Ambalangoda		Galle Electoral District		Sri Lanka	
Party	Votes	%	Votes	%	Votes	%
PA	24,642	55.79%	281,154	54.91%	4,312,157	51.12%
UNP	16,358	37.03%	195,906	38.26%	3,602,748	42.71%
JVP	2,595	5.87%	27,257	5.32%	343,927	4.08%
Other Parties (with < 1%)	576	1.30%	7,702	1.50%	176,679	2.09%
Valid Votes	44,171	98.05%	512,019	98.14%	8,435,754	97.69%
Rejected Votes	880	1.95%	9,716	1.86%	199,536	2.31%
Total Polled	45,051	76.95%	521,735	77.43%	8,635,290	72.17%
Registered Electors	58,545		673,785		11,965,536	

=== 1994 Sri Lankan Presidential Election ===
Party	Ambalangoda		Galle Electoral District		Sri Lanka	
Party	Votes	%	Votes	%	Votes	%
PA	25,258	63.92%	285,398	61.40%	4,709,205	62.28%
UNP	13,735	34.76%	173,282	37.28%	2,715,283	35.91%
Other Parties (with < 1%)	520	1.32%	6,135	1.32%	137,040	1.81%
Valid Votes	39,513	98.72%	464,815	98.49%	7,561,526	98.03%
Rejected Votes	514	1.28%	7,112	1.51%	151,706	1.97%
Total Polled	40,027	71.42%	471,927	73.01%	7,713,232	69.12%
Registered Electors	56,041		646,373		11,158,880	

=== 1988 Sri Lankan Presidential Election ===
Party	Ambalangoda		Galle Electoral District		Sri Lanka	
Party	Votes	%	Votes	%	Votes	%
SLFP	3,444	49.48%	148,615	53.09%	2,289,857	44.95%
UNP	3,282	47.16%	124,912	44.62%	2,569,199	50.43%
SLMP	234	3.36%	6,417	2.29%	235,701	4.63%
Valid Votes	6,960	97.89%	279,944	98.43%	5,094,754	98.24%
Rejected Votes	150	2.11%	4,461	1.57%	91,499	1.76%
Total Polled	7,110	14.25%	284,405	49.34%	5,186,256	55.87%
Registered Electors	49,885		576,390		9,283,143	

=== 1982 Sri Lankan Presidential Election ===
Party	Ambalangoda		Galle Electoral District		Sri Lanka	
Party	Votes	%	Votes	%	Votes	%
UNP	17,784	48.22%	211,544	50.23%	3,450,815	52.93%
SLFP	16,225	43.99%	180,925	42.96%	2,546,348	39.05%
JVP	2,271	6.16%	20,962	4.98%	273,428	4.19%
LSSP	515	1.40%	6,391	1.52%	58,531	0.90%
Other Parties (with < 1%)	86	0.23%	1,316	0.31%	190,929	2.93%
Valid Votes	36,881	98.73%	421,138	98.78%	6,520,156	98.78%
Rejected Votes	474	1.27%	5,198	1.22%	80,470	1.22%
Total Polled	37,355	82.85%	426,336	81.84%	6,600,626	80.15%
Registered Electors	45,086		520,909		8,235,358	

== Parliamentary Election Results ==
=== Summary ===
The winner of Ambalangoda has matched the final country result 5 out of 7 times. Hence, Ambalangoda is a Weak Bellwether for Parliamentary Elections.

Year	Ambalangoda	Galle Electoral District	MAE %	Sri Lanka	MAE %
2015	UPFA	UPFA	0.99%	UNP	4.59%
2010	UPFA	UPFA	1.25%	UPFA	5.87%
2004	UPFA	UPFA	0.75%	UPFA	5.31%
2001	PA	UNP	0.69%	UNP	3.73%
2000	PA	PA	0.62%	PA	2.09%
1994	PA	PA	0.31%	PA	5.17%
1989	UNP	UNP	0.98%	UNP	3.10%
Matches/Mean MAE	5/7	6/7	0.80%	7/7	4.27%

=== 2015 Sri Lankan Parliamentary Election ===
Party	Ambalangoda		Galle Electoral District		Sri Lanka	
Party	Votes	%	Votes	%	Votes	%
UPFA	26,473	48.78%	312,518	50.07%	4,732,664	42.48%
UNP	22,671	41.78%	265,180	42.49%	5,098,916	45.77%
JVP	3,532	6.51%	37,778	6.05%	544,154	4.88%
DP	1,236	2.28%	2,967	0.48%	28,587	0.26%
Other Parties (with < 1%)	357	0.66%	5,692	0.91%	54,265	0.49%
Valid Votes	54,269	97.52%	624,135	97.63%	11,140,333	95.35%
Rejected Votes	1,372	2.47%	15,107	2.36%	516,926	4.42%
Total Polled	55,650	73.69%	639,318	78.00%	11,684,111	77.66%
Registered Electors	75,524		819,666		15,044,490	

=== 2010 Sri Lankan Parliamentary Election ===
Party	Ambalangoda		Galle Electoral District		Sri Lanka	
Party	Votes	%	Votes	%	Votes	%
UPFA	26,210	66.34%	305,307	66.17%	4,846,388	60.38%
UNP	8,926	22.59%	120,101	26.03%	2,357,057	29.37%
DNA	4,180	10.58%	33,663	7.30%	441,251	5.50%
Other Parties (with < 1%)	192	0.49%	2,317	0.50%	32,313	0.40%
Valid Votes	39,508	94.82%	461,388	95.05%	8,026,322	96.03%
Rejected Votes	2,160	5.18%	24,013	4.95%	581,465	6.96%
Total Polled	41,668	60.58%	485,401	61.67%	8,358,246	59.29%
Registered Electors	68,780		787,139		14,097,690	

=== 2004 Sri Lankan Parliamentary Election ===
Party	Ambalangoda		Galle Electoral District		Sri Lanka	
Party	Votes	%	Votes	%	Votes	%
UPFA	26,435	56.75%	306,385	56.58%	4,223,126	45.70%
UNP	17,289	37.11%	209,399	38.67%	3,486,792	37.73%
JHU	2,544	5.46%	22,826	4.22%	552,723	5.98%
Other Parties (with < 1%)	317	0.68%	2,901	0.54%	60,066	0.65%
Valid Votes	46,585	95.13%	541,511	94.69%	9,241,931	94.52%
Rejected Votes	2,384	4.87%	30,380	5.31%	534,452	5.47%
Total Polled	48,969	77.12%	571,891	79.81%	9,777,821	75.74%
Registered Electors	63,495		716,609		12,909,631	

=== 2001 Sri Lankan Parliamentary Election ===
Party	Ambalangoda		Galle Electoral District		Sri Lanka	
Party	Votes	%	Votes	%	Votes	%
PA	20,409	43.24%	232,931	42.98%	3,330,815	37.19%
UNP	20,295	43.00%	238,989	44.10%	4,086,026	45.62%
JVP	5,761	12.21%	61,806	11.41%	815,353	9.10%
Other Parties (with < 1%)	734	1.56%	8,188	1.51%	143,033	1.60%
Valid Votes	47,199	96.05%	541,914	95.66%	8,955,844	94.77%
Rejected Votes	1,942	3.95%	24,561	4.34%	494,009	5.23%
Total Polled	49,141	79.50%	566,475	81.09%	9,449,878	76.03%
Registered Electors	61,813		698,558		12,428,762	

=== 2000 Sri Lankan Parliamentary Election ===
Party	Ambalangoda		Galle Electoral District		Sri Lanka	
Party	Votes	%	Votes	%	Votes	%
PA	22,657	49.24%	264,601	50.08%	3,899,329	45.33%
UNP	18,662	40.56%	212,055	40.14%	3,451,765	40.12%
JVP	3,772	8.20%	41,620	7.88%	518,725	6.03%
Other Parties (with < 1%)	920	2.00%	10,072	1.91%	250,489	2.91%
Valid Votes	46,011	N/A	528,348	N/A	8,602,617	N/A

=== 1994 Sri Lankan Parliamentary Election ===
Party	Ambalangoda		Galle Electoral District		Sri Lanka	
Party	Votes	%	Votes	%	Votes	%
PA	24,417	56.74%	277,956	56.39%	3,887,805	48.94%
UNP	17,643	41.00%	203,268	41.24%	3,498,370	44.04%
SLPF	780	1.81%	7,239	1.47%	90,078	1.13%
Other Parties (with < 1%)	192	0.45%	4,451	0.90%	69,351	0.87%
Valid Votes	43,032	95.98%	492,914	95.96%	7,943,688	95.20%
Rejected Votes	1,801	4.02%	20,763	4.04%	400,395	4.80%
Total Polled	44,833	80.00%	513,677	79.57%	8,344,095	74.75%
Registered Electors	56,041		645,559		11,163,064	

=== 1989 Sri Lankan Parliamentary Election ===
Party	Ambalangoda		Galle Electoral District		Sri Lanka	
Party	Votes	%	Votes	%	Votes	%
UNP	15,386	50.18%	183,962	50.40%	2,838,005	50.71%
SLFP	12,248	39.94%	152,096	41.67%	1,785,369	31.90%
USA	2,365	7.71%	18,160	4.98%	141,983	2.54%
ELJP	373	1.22%	4,097	1.12%	67,723	1.21%
Other Parties (with < 1%)	292	0.95%	6,690	1.83%	292,496	5.23%
Valid Votes	30,664	92.45%	365,005	93.94%	5,596,468	93.87%
Rejected Votes	2,505	7.55%	23,536	6.06%	365,563	6.13%
Total Polled	33,169	68.07%	388,541	68.03%	5,962,031	63.60%
Registered Electors	48,725		571,146		9,374,164	

== Demographics ==
=== Ethnicity ===
The Ambalangoda Polling Division has a Sinhalese majority (99.7%) . In comparison, the Galle Electoral District (which contains the Ambalangoda Polling Division) has a Sinhalese majority (94.4%)

Ethnicity in Ambalangoda
1. Sinhalese (99.7%)
2. Other (0.30%)

=== Religion ===
The Ambalangoda Polling Division has a Buddhist majority (99.2%) . In comparison, the Galle Electoral District (which contains the Ambalangoda Polling Division) has a Buddhist majority (93.9%)

Religion in Ambalangoda
1. Buddhist (99.2%)
2. Other (0.80%)
