= Ajith Kumara =

Sri Lankan politician

Hon. Ajith Kumara MP

Member of Parliament for Galle District
- In office 2004–2015

Personal details
- Born: 27 June 1973 (age 53)
- Party: Independent
- Other political affiliations: Democratic National Alliance, Janatha Vimukthi Peramuna
- Profession: Attorney-at-Law

Ajith Kumara Galbokka Hewage is a Sri Lankan politician and a member of the Parliament of Sri Lanka.
