= Galle Electoral District =

Electoral district of Sri Lanka

Galle
- Electoral District for the Parliament of Sri Lanka
- Administrative District: Galle
- Province: Southern
- Polling divisions: 10
- Population: 1,063,000 (2008)
- Electorate: 761,815 (2010)
- Area: 1,652 km^{2} (638 sq mi)

Current Electoral District
- Number of members: 9
- MPs: NPP (7) Nalin Hewage; Rathna Gamage; Nayanathara Premathilake; Nishantha Samaraweera; Thilanka Rukmal; Nishantha Perera; T. K. Jayasundara SJB (1) Gayantha Karunathilaka SLPP (1) Chanaka Sampath

Galle Electoral District is one of the 22 multi-member electoral districts of Sri Lanka created by the 1978 Constitution of Sri Lanka. The district is conterminous with the administrative district of Galle in the Southern province. The district currently elects 10 of the 225 members of the Sri Lankan Parliament and had 761,815 registered electors in 2010. The district is Sri Lanka's Electorate Number 07.

== Polling Divisions ==
The Galle Electoral District consists of the following polling divisions:

A: Balapitiya

B: Ambalangoda

C: Karandeniya

D: Bentara-Elpitiya

E: Hiniduma

F: Baddegama

G: Ratgama

H: Galle

I: Akmeemana

J: Habaraduwa

== 1982 Presidential Election ==
Results of the 1st presidential election held on 20 October 1982 for the district:

Candidate	Party	Votes per Polling Division										Postal Votes	Total Votes	%
Candidate	Party	Akmee -mana	Ambalan -goda	Badde -gama	Bala- pitiya	Bentara Elpitiya	Galle	Habara -duwa	Hini- duma	Karan- deniya	Rat- gama	Postal Votes	Total Votes	%
Junius Jayewardene	UNP	20,269	17,784	22,301	14,949	23,668	23,785	18,960	27,209	17,060	20,801	4,758	211,544	50.23%
Hector Kobbekaduwa	SLFP	19,623	16,225	23,689	9,295	21,805	11,508	22,600	19,649	12,732	20,798	3,001	180,925	42.96%
Rohana Wijeweera	JVP	1,533	2,271	1,981	1,178	2,106	2,279	2,239	1,629	3,026	2,409	311	20,962	4.98%
Colvin R. de Silva	LSSP	188	515	381	3,060	294	255	180	210	181	907	220	6,391	1.52%
Vasudeva Nanayakkara	NSSP	135	64	129	45	69	125	113	64	40	71	36	891	0.21%
Kumar Ponnambalam	ACTC	32	22	79	14	36	63	34	60	45	39	1	425	0.10%
Valid Votes		41,780	36,881	48,560	28,541	47,978	38,015	44,126	48,821	33,084	45,025	8,327	421,138	100.00%
Rejected Votes		389	474	540	546	686	389	361	605	367	748	93	5,198	
Total Polled		42,169	37,355	49,100	29,087	48,664	38,404	44,487	49,426	33,451	45,773	8,420	426,336	
Registered Electors		51,073	45,086	59,040	37,444	58,596	51,574	56,053	57,075	41,355	55,193		512,489	
Turnout		82.57%	82.85%	83.16%	77.68%	83.05%	74.46%	79.37%	86.60%	80.89%	82.93%		83.19%	

== 1988 Presidential Election ==
Results of the 2nd presidential election held on 19 December 1988 for the district:

Candidate	Party	Votes per Polling Division										Postal Votes	Total Votes	%
Candidate	Party	Akmee -mana	Ambalan -goda	Badde -gama	Bala- pitiya	Bentara Elpitiya	Galle	Habara -duwa	Hini- duma	Karan- deniya	Rat- gama	Postal Votes	Total Votes	%
Sirimavo Bandaranaike	SLFP	22,877	3,444	27,061	3,475	12,057	17,432	18,329	22,347	5,703	13,290	2,600	148,615	53.09%
Ranasinghe Premadasa	UNP	16,865	3,282	20,368	5,093	8,789	19,227	11,500	22,029	4,210	11,539	2,010	124,912	44.62%
Oswin Abeygunasekara	SLMP	664	234	941	354	481	869	637	794	189	1,043	211	6,417	2.29%
Valid Votes		40,406	6,960	48,370	8,922	21,327	37,528	30,466	45,170	10,102	25,872	4,821	279,944	100.00%
Rejected Votes		368	150	793	162	299	633	438	745	151	456	266	4,461	
Total Polled		40,774	7,110	49,163	9,084	21,626	38,161	30,904	45,915	10,253	26,328	5,087	284,405	
Registered Electors		57,724	49,885	65,351	41,220	65,597	56,083	61,369	65,310	47,887	60,877		571,303	
Turnout		70.64%	14.25%	75.23%	22.04%	32.97%	68.04%	50.36%	70.30%	21.41%	43.25%		49.78%	

== 1989 Parliamentary General Election ==
Results of the 9th parliamentary election held on 15 February 1989 for the district:

Party	Votes per Polling Division										Postal Votes	Total Votes	%	Seats
Party	Akmee -mana	Ambalan -goda	Badde -gama	Bala- pitiya	Bentara Elpitiya	Galle	Habara -duwa	Hini- duma	Karan- deniya	Rat- gama	Postal Votes	Total Votes	%	Seats
United National Party	19,615	15,386	23,790	13,052	18,482	17,547	14,840	25,466	9,516	21,511	4,757	183,962	50.40%	6
Sri Lanka Freedom Party	19,613	12,248	22,325	4,130	15,849	13,523	12,857	22,597	10,402	14,593	3,959	152,096	41.67%	5
United Socialist Alliance (CPSL, LSSP, NSSP, SLMP)	285	2,365	461	6,475	3,465	469	303	311	410	3,100	516	18,160	4.98%	0
United Lanka People's Party	452	373	174	197	153	1,779	241	162	271	180	115	4,097	1.12%	0
Sri Lanka Muslim Congress	160	58	114	188	205	2,899	55	92	134	85	24	4,014	1.10%	0
Mahajana Eksath Peramuna	161	234	115	142	258	281	472	298	66	534	115	2,676	0.73%	0
Valid Votes	40,286	30,664	46,979	24,184	38,412	36,498	28,768	48,926	20,799	40,003	9,486	365,005	100.00%	11
Rejected Votes	1,856	2,505	2,705	2,191	3,152	1,587	1,792	2,954	1,777	2,729	288	23,536		
Total Polled	42,142	33,169	49,684	26,375	41,564	38,085	30,560	51,880	22,576	42,732	9,774	388,541		
Registered Electors	56,408	48,725	64,390	40,345	64,529	54,738	60,474	64,452	47,426	59,508	10,151	571,146		
Turnout	74.71%	68.07%	77.16%	65.37%	64.41%	69.58%	50.53%	80.49%	47.60%	71.81%	96.29%	68.03%		

The following candidates were elected: Amarasiri Dodangoda (SLFP), 66,431 preference votes (pv); Bentota Pathiranage Richard de Silva (SLFP), 64,268 pv; Matarage Upali Sarath Danston Amarasiri (UNP), 63,985 pv; Rupa Karunathilake (UNP), 51,147 pv; Don Ranjith Nanda Kumarage (UNP), 43,609 pv; Vincent Jayawardene (UNP), 42,085 pv; Hemakumara Nanayakkara (SLFP), 37,310 pv; Kariyawasam Haputhanthri Gamage Noel Padmasiri (SLFP), 35,772 pv; Piyasena Gamage (SLFP); 35,456 pv; Rannulu Nandimiththa G. de Soyza (UNP); 28,474 pv; and Buddhika Kurukularatne (UNP), 24,010 pv.

== 1993 Provincial Council Election ==
Results of the 2nd Southern provincial council election held on 17 May 1993 for the district:

Party	Votes	%	Seats
United National Party	190,478	44.32%	
People's Alliance (SLFP et al.)	189,114	44.00%	
Democratic United National Front	39,036	9.08%	
Nava Sama Samaja Party	5,227	1.22%	
Others	5,903	1.37%	
Valid Votes	429,758	100.00%	
Rejected Votes	27,829		
Total Polled	457,587		
Registered Electors	622,127		
Turnout	73.55%		

== 1994 Provincial Council Election ==
Results of the 3rd Southern provincial council election held on 24 March 1994 for the district:

Party	Votes	%	Seats
People's Alliance (SLFP et al.)	238,770	44.32%	
United National Party	200,004	44.00%	
Nava Sama Samaja Party	7,150	9.08%	
Sinhalaye Mahasammatha Bhoomiputra Pakshaya	1,725	1.22%	
Valid Votes	447,649	100.00%	
Rejected Votes	22,600		
Total Polled	470,249		
Registered Electors	622,129		
Turnout	75.59%		

== 1994 Parliamentary General Election ==
Results of the 10th parliamentary election held on 16 August 1994 for the district:

Party	Votes per Polling Division										Postal Votes	Total Votes	%	Seats
Party	Akmee -mana	Ambalan -goda	Badde -gama	Bala- pitiya	Bentara Elpitiya	Galle	Habara -duwa	Hini- duma	Karan- deniya	Rat- gama	Postal Votes	Total Votes	%	Seats
People's Alliance (SLFP et al.)	28,027	24,417	33,572	16,907	31,222	23,347	29,716	33,648	21,880	27,243	7,977	277,956	56.39%	6
United National Party	20,576	17,643	23,874	14,239	22,059	19,885	18,528	26,099	15,830	20,412	4,123	203,268	41.24%	4
Sri Lanka Progressive Front (JVP)	645	780	505	421	940	612	819	601	805	891	220	7,239	1.47%	0
Mahajana Eksath Peramuna	704	172	389	99	202	983	732	296	105	340	123	4,145	0.84%	0
People's Freedom Front	23	20	79	12	24	15	39	42	25	24	3	306	0.06%	0
Valid Votes	49,975	43,032	58,419	31,678	54,447	44,842	49,834	60,686	38,645	48,910	12,446	492,914	100.00%	10
Rejected Votes	1,808	1,801	2,937	1,380	2,418	1,418	1,962	2,747	1,975	2,132	185	20,763		
Total Polled	51,783	44,833	61,356	33,058	56,865	46,260	51,796	63,433	40,620	51,042	12,631	513,677		
Registered Electors	64,320	56,041	74,331	43,988	71,765	62,011	66,342	74,337	53,066	66,221		632,422		
Turnout	80.51%	80.00%	82.54%	75.15%	79.24%	74.60%	78.07%	85.33%	76.55%	77.08%		81.22%		

The following candidates were elected: Amarasiri Dodangoda (PA), 176,151 preference votes (pv); Richard Bentota Pathirana (PA), 116,893 pv; Vajira Abeywardena (UNP), 81,373 pv; Piyasena Gamage (PA), 67,033 pv; Ganegama Liyanage Sarath Gunawardena (UNP), 56,568 pv; Amarasiri Matarage Upali Sarath Dunstan (UNP), 53,577 pv; Rupa Karunathilake (UNP), 52,577 pv; Kariyawasam Haputhanthri Gamage Noel Padmasiri (PA), 52,370 pv; Kalu Arachchige Nandadasa Gunasinghe (PA), 46,948 pv; and Asoka Weerasinghe de Silva (PA), 45,022 pv.

== 1994 Presidential Election ==
Results of the 3rd presidential election held on 9 November 1994 for the district:

Candidate	Party	Votes per Polling Division										Postal Votes	Total Votes	%
Candidate	Party	Akmee -mana	Ambalan -goda	Badde -gama	Bala- pitiya	Bentara Elpitiya	Galle	Habara -duwa	Hini- duma	Karan- deniya	Rat- gama	Postal Votes	Total Votes	%
Chandrika Kumaratunga	PA	29,135	25,258	33,932	17,307	32,213	23,587	29,689	34,003	22,470	28,618	9,186	285,398	61.40%
Srimathi Dissanayake	UNP	17,679	13,735	20,785	12,087	18,747	17,258	16,115	23,216	11,934	17,406	4,320	173,282	37.28%
Hudson Samarasinghe	Ind 2	111	163	272	108	224	83	220	282	244	164	14	1,885	0.41%
Harischandra Wijayatunga	SMBP	190	140	174	59	160	185	172	157	127	138	82	1,584	0.34%
Nihal Galappaththi	SLPF	128	116	185	70	132	98	158	208	173	156	63	1,487	0.32%
A.J. Ranashinge	Ind 1	117	101	131	83	124	127	129	172	81	81	33	1,179	0.25%
Valid Votes		47,360	39,513	55,479	29,714	51,600	41,338	46,483	58,038	35,029	46,563	13,698	464,815	100.00%
Rejected Votes		672	514	952	375	773	615	656	1,059	583	660	253	7,112	
Total Polled		48,032	40,027	56,431	30,089	52,373	41,953	47,139	59,097	35,612	47,223	13,951	471,927	
Registered Electors		64,320	56,041	74,331	43,988	71,765	62,011	66,342	74,337	53,066	66,221		632,422	
Turnout		74.68%	71.42%	75.92%	68.40%	72.98%	67.65%	71.05%	79.50%	67.11%	71.31%		74.62%	

== 1999 Provincial Council Election ==
Results of the 4th Southern provincial council election held on 10 June 1999 for the district:

Party	Votes	%	Seats
People's Alliance (SLFP, SLMC et al.)	214,714	46.70%	11
United National Party	188,921	41.09%	9
Janatha Vimukthi Peramuna	38,817	8.44%	2
Mahajana Eksath Peramuna	5,496	1.20%	0
New Left Front (NSSP et al.)	4,981	1.08%	0
Independent 1	4,550	0.99%	0
Muslim United Liberation Front	739	0.16%	0
People's Liberation Solidarity Front	444	0.10%	0
Independent 3	392	0.09%	0
Liberal Party	340	0.07%	0
People's Freedom Front	197	0.04%	0
Independent 2	178	0.04%	0
Valid Votes	459,769	100.00%	22
Rejected Votes			
Total Polled			
Registered Electors			
Turnout			

== 1999 Presidential Election ==
Results of the 4th presidential election held on 21 December 1999 for the district:

Candidate	Party	Votes per Polling Division										Postal Votes	Total Votes	%
Candidate	Party	Akmee -mana	Ambalan -goda	Badde -gama	Bala- pitiya	Bentara Elpitiya	Galle	Habara -duwa	Hini- duma	Karan- deniya	Rat- gama	Postal Votes	Total Votes	%
Chandrika Kumaratunga	PA	30,327	24,642	34,097	17,524	31,626	22,008	28,137	35,712	22,445	28,404	6,232	281,154	54.91%
Ranil Wickremasinghe	UNP	19,749	16,358	22,969	13,372	21,196	20,042	18,064	25,292	14,882	19,134	4,848	195,906	38.26%
Nandana Gunathilake	JVP	2,602	2,595	2,406	1,466	3,128	2,207	2,727	3,183	3,157	2,497	1,289	27,257	5.32%
Harischandra Wijayatunga	SMBP	150	141	167	101	169	225	161	95	115	144	124	1,592	0.31%
W.V.M. Ranjith	Ind 2	129	78	191	75	115	64	135	174	144	104	18	1,227	0.24%
T. Edirisuriya	Ind 1	91	62	136	54	125	63	94	135	103	91	14	968	0.19%
Vasudeva Nanayakkara	LDA	124	84	91	60	82	112	92	50	55	79	123	952	0.19%
Rajiva Wijesinha	Liberal	81	55	148	53	119	61	97	152	51	88	2	907	0.18%
Kamal Karunadasa	PLSF	62	47	91	29	76	37	67	110	65	74	5	663	0.13%
Abdul Rasool	SLMP	69	55	82	37	69	119	55	75	51	32	7	651	0.13%
Hudson Samarasinghe	Ind 3	41	32	56	9	44	18	40	59	30	26	2	357	0.07%
A.W. Premawardhana	PFF	16	13	40	8	24	7	20	48	16	15	3	210	0.04%
A. Dissanayaka	DUNF	20	9	22	12	22	15	15	24	19	10	7	175	0.03%
Valid Votes		53,461	44,171	60,496	32,800	56,795	44,978	49,704	65,109	41,133	50,698	12,674	512,019	100.00%
Rejected Votes		1,070	880	1,145	539	991	1,000	1,086	873	857	749	526	9,716	
Total Polled		54,531	45,051	61,641	33,339	57,786	45,978	50,790	65,982	41,990	51,447	13,200	521,735	
Registered Electors		69,229	58,545	76,860	45,790	75,271	63,300	67,833	78,752	56,502	68,503		660,585	
Turnout		78.77%	76.95%	80.20%	72.81%	76.77%	72.64%	74.88%	83.78%	74.32%	75.10%		78.98%	

== 2000 Parliamentary General Election ==
Results of the 11th parliamentary election held on 10 October 2000 for the district:

Party	Votes per Polling Division										Postal Votes	Total Votes	%	Seats
Party	Akmee -mana	Ambalan -goda	Badde -gama	Bala- pitiya	Bentara Elpitiya	Galle	Habara -duwa	Hini- duma	Karan- deniya	Rat- gama	Postal Votes	Total Votes	%	Seats
People's Alliance (SLFP et al.)	28,840	22,657	31,845	15,745	30,213	20,004	25,974	34,278	21,035	26,619	7,391	264,601	50.08%	5
United National Party	21,342	18,662	23,548	14,594	22,811	22,351	19,639	26,629	17,491	19,910	5,078	212,055	40.14%	4
Janatha Vimukthi Peramuna	3,925	3,772	3,937	2,417	4,442	3,855	4,481	4,493	4,334	4,274	1,690	41,620	7.88%	1
Sinhala Heritage	540	404	305	311	520	833	472	218	247	459	226	4,535	0.86%	0
New Left Front (NSSP et al.)	188	274	392	133	256	102	206	254	249	250	13	2,317	0.44%	0
Independent 2	76	70	128	41	91	34	59	69	75	56	5	704	0.13%	0
Citizen's Front	53	26	44	136	35	60	45	51	28	81	13	572	0.11%	0
United Lalith Front	37	49	71	36	64	29	52	58	57	38	7	498	0.09%	0
Sinhalaye Mahasammatha Bhoomiputra Pakshaya	44	16	31	19	29	42	26	29	20	31	21	308	0.06%	0
Democratic United National Front	16	22	34	7	31	15	24	46	17	25	3	240	0.05%	0
Liberal Party	17	18	49	4	27	5	15	27	20	21	1	204	0.04%	0
Independent 1	12	17	33	7	15	16	17	17	15	21	3	173	0.03%	0
United Sinhala Great Council	17	7	31	7	21	12	16	31	14	9	2	167	0.03%	0
Sri Lanka Muslim Party	11	6	16	7	27	28	11	11	10	14	2	143	0.03%	0
	5	8	11	14	3	7	6		9	4		76	0.01%	0
People's Freedom Front	10	3	10	5	6	6	7	12	5	3	1	68	0.01%	0
Sri Lanka Progressive Front	13	0	6	3	8	2	8	11	9	7	0	67	0.01%	0
Valid Votes	55,146	46,011	60,491	33,486	58,599	47,401	51,058	66,234*	43,635	51,822	14,456*	528,348	100.00%	10
Rejected Votes	2,217	1,905	3,542	1,053	2,874	1,774	2,300		1,905	2,260		22,794		
Total Polled	57,363	47,916	64,033	34,539	61,473	49,175	53,358		45,540	54,082		551,142		
Registered Electors	71,256	60,173	78,867	46,935	77,095	65,313	69,196	81,128	58,321	70,225		678,509		
Turnout	80.50%	79.63%	81.19%	73.59%	79.74%	75.29%	77.11%		78.09%	77.01%		81.23%		

The following candidates were elected: Richard Pathirana (PA), 114,658 preference votes (pv); Vajira Abeywardena (UNP), 104,483 pv; Amarasiri Dodangoda (PA), 89,149 pv; Hemakumara Nanayakkara (UNP), 70,231 pv; Piyasena Gamage (PA), 62,830 pv; Gayantha Karunathilaka (UNP), 60,728 pv; A.A. Keerthi Suranjith Mawellage (PA), 51,899 pv; G. L. Sarath Gunawardena (UNP), 46,656 pv; Kariyawasam Haputhanthri Gamage Noel Padmasiri (PA), 46,600 pv; and Athula Indika Weerakoon (JVP), 2,664 pv.

== 2001 Parliamentary General Election ==
Results of the 12th parliamentary election held on 5 December 2001 for the district:

Party	Votes per Polling Division										Postal Votes	Total Votes	%	Seats
Party	Akmee -mana	Ambalan -goda	Badde -gama	Bala- pitiya	Bentara Elpitiya	Galle	Habara -duwa	Hini- duma	Karan- deniya	Rat- gama	Postal Votes	Total Votes	%	Seats
United National Front (UNP, SLMC, CWC, WPF)	24,798	20,295	27,447	16,030	25,114	27,516	21,617	29,666	18,632	22,487		238,989	44.10%	5
People's Alliance (SLFP et al.)	25,562	20,409	28,326	13,956	26,732	15,640	23,508	30,151	18,925	24,018		232,931	42.98%	4
Janatha Vimukthi Peramuna	5,426	5,761	5,714	3,930	7,236	5,263	6,882	6,717	6,718	5,715		61,806	11.41%	1
New Left Front (NSSP et al.)	213	282	350	155	290	94	239	353	240	214		2,448	0.45%	0
Sinhala Heritage	253	228	153	180	279	407	216	113	114	274		2,328	0.43%	0
United Socialist Party	84	44	103	42	80	69	53	133	45	71		728	0.13%	0
Independent 5	45	46	118	28	92	29	53		68	51		603	0.11%	0
Democratic Left Front	37	16	38	15	11	217	17		9	72		465	0.09%	0
United Lalith Front	37	31	61	25	70	27	51		46	51		465	0.09%	0
Democratic United National Front	32	24	43	16	28	11	26		30	30		292	0.05%	0
Liberal Party	13	16	30	5	32	9	8		29	6		173	0.03%	0
Independent 4	17	5	18	10	30	5	12		8	11		139	0.03%	0
Independent 1	6	11	26	5	17	3	12		11	5		117	0.02%	0
United Sinhala Great Council	16	10	13	4	14	5	11		11	13		114	0.02%	0
Independent 3	9	4	21	3	12	8	10		7	4		101	0.02%	0
People's Freedom Front	8	6	11	0	7	4	7		3	5		68	0.01%	0
Independent 2	4	3	10	2	8	2	5		5	5		50	0.01%	0
Sri Lanka National Front	7	4	6	1	9	5	4		3	3		50	0.01%	0
Sri Lanka Progressive Front	3	4	9	3	7	2	4		2	6		47	0.01%	0
Valid Votes	56,570	47,199	62,497	34,410	60,068	49,316	52,735	67,476*	44,906	53,041		541,914	100.00%	10
Rejected Votes	2,456	1,942	3,928	1,426	2,816	2,006	2,355	3,042	2,012	2,360		24,561		
Total Polled	59,026	49,141	66,425	35,836	62,884	51,322	55,090	70,518	46,918	55,401		566,475		
Registered Electors	73,397	61,813	81,026	47,774	78,967	68,949	71,473	83,302	60,273	71,592		698,566		
Turnout	80.42%	79.50%	81.98%	75.01%	79.63%	74.43%	77.08%	84.65%	77.84%	77.38%		81.09%		

The following candidates were elected: Vajira Abeywardena (UNF), 110,055 preference votes (pv); Amarasiri Dodangoda (PA), 78,697 pv; Hemakumara Nanayakkara (UNF), 78,590 pv; Richard Pathirane (PA), 72,737 pv; Gayantha Karunathilaka (UNF), 64,257 pv; Piyasena Gamage (PA), 54,570 pv; Ananda Abeywickrama (UNF), 50,772 pv; Jayantha Jayaweera (UNF), 49,667 pv; Baddegama Samitha (PA), 42,120 pv; and Athula Indika Weerakoon (JVP), 2,938 pv.

== 2004 Parliamentary General Election ==
Results of the 13th parliamentary election held on 2 April 2004 for the district:

Party	Votes per Polling Division										Postal Votes	Total Votes	%	Seats
Party	Akmee -mana	Ambalan -goda	Badde -gama	Bala- pitiya	Bentara Elpitiya	Galle	Habara -duwa	Hini- duma	Karan- deniya	Rat- gama	Postal Votes	Total Votes	%	Seats
United People's Freedom Alliance (SLFP, JVP et al.)	30,897	26,435	35,936	18,002	34,840	20,779	30,648	38,633	29,807	29,413	10,995	306,385	56.58%	6
United National Front (UNP, SLMC, CWC, WPF)	21,249	17,289	24,572	14,117	22,243	23,585	19,417	27,440	14,377	19,408	5,702	209,399	38.67%	4
Jathika Hela Urumaya	3,095	2,544	1,368	1,944	2,411	4,166	1,667	1,119	1,187	2,267	1,058	22,826	4.22%	0
United Lalith Front	42	45	213	37	45	60	51	82		49	4	674	0.12%	0
National Development Front	64	80	77	40	83	85	48	50		53	9	626	0.12%	0
New Left Front (NSSP et al.)	49	99	42	11	16	110	30	15		38	23	457	0.08%	0
United Socialist Party	54	25	58	30	49	56	42	67		44	6	456	0.08%	0
Independent 9	16	13	28	10	18	11	19	24		13	0	164	0.03%	0
Independent 1	16	14	5	7	12	5	22	10		21	0	121	0.02%	0
Sinhalaye Mahasammatha Bhoomiputra Pakshaya	9	11	8	2	4	3	3	9		17	3	74	0.01%	0
Independent 8	7	5	11	1	5	5	8	3		4	1	64	0.01%	0
Independent 3	5	2	11	3	2	5	2	8		4	1	44	0.01%	0
Ruhuna People's Party	3	7	6	8	2	1	3	2		3	0	38	0.01%	0
Independent 5	5	4	9	0	4	0	4	3		3	0	32	0.01%	0
Independent 7	4	1	7	3	5	2	0	4		3	0	32	0.01%	0
Swarajya	6	0	4	0	3	4	2	2		1	4	28	0.01%	0
Independent 6	0	0	5	0	5	1	0	5		6	0	25	0.00%	0
Sri Lanka National Front	0	6	3	0	1	0	1	2		0	2	21	0.00%	0
Independent 2	4	2	3	0	1	0	2	2		2	0	19	0.00%	0
Sri Lanka Progressive Front	1	3	3	2	0	0	1	1		1	0	13	0.00%	0
Independent 4	1	0	0	0	1	1	0	2		5	2	13	0.00%	0
Valid Votes	55,527	46,585	62,369	34,217	59,750	48,879	51,970	67,483	45,566*	51,355	17,810	541,511	100.00%	10
Rejected Votes	3,007	2,384	4,727	1,489	3,369	2,227	3,135	4,371	2,464	2,913	294	30,380		
Total Polled	58,534	48,969	67,096	35,706	63,119	51,106	55,105	71,854	48,030	54,268	18,104	571,891		
Registered Electors	76,101	63,495	83,381	48,387	80,943	70,204	72,566	86,343	62,180	73,009		716,709		
Turnout	76.92%	77.12%	80.47%	73.79%	77.98%	72.80%	75.94%	83.22%	77.24%	74.33%		79.79%		

The following candidates were elected: Ajith Kumara (UPFA-JVP), 128,060 preference votes (pv); Vajira Abeywardena (UNF-UNP), 126,037 pv; Chandrasena Wijesinghe (UPFA-JVP), 101,377 pv; Thilakaratne Withanachchi (UPFA-JVP) 85,627 pv; Hemakumara Nanayakkara (UNF-UNP), 81,382 pv; Piyasena Gamage (UPFA-SLFP), 71,307 pv; Amarasiri Dodangoda (UPFA-SLFP), 60,282 pv; Gunaratna Weerakoon (UPFA-SLFP), 58,154 pv; Gayantha Karunathilaka (UNF-UNP), 55,757 pv; and Lionel Premasiri (UNF-UNP), 39,519 pv.

Amarasiri Dodangoda (UPFA-SLFP) died on 30 May 2009. His replacement Chandima Weerakkody (UPFA-SLFP) was sworn in on 9 June 2009.

== 2004 Provincial Council Election ==
Results of the 5th Southern provincial council election held on 10 July 2004 for the district:

Party	Votes per Polling Division										Postal Votes	Total Votes	%	Seats
Party	Akmee -mana	Ambalan -goda	Badde -gama	Bala- pitiya	Bentara Elpitiya	Galle	Habara -duwa	Hini- duma	Karan- deniya	Rat- gama	Postal Votes	Total Votes	%	Seats
United People's Freedom Alliance (SLFP, JVP et al.)	23,486	23,580	28,681	13,530	26,235	17,694	21,626	33,532	19,058	24,339	6,524	238,285	62.50%	14
United National Party	13,996	10,467	17,627	9,398	15,777	14,293	12,410	21,390	9,154	11,679	2,977	139,168	36.51%	9
United Socialist Party	89	1,194	111	57	76	94	67	139	132	291	28	2,278	0.60%	0
United Lalith Front	42	33	74	31	51	55	44	70	31	37	4	472	0.12%	0
Sinhalaye Mahasammatha Bhoomiputra Pakshaya	24	43	19	34	30	40	20	31	19	131	20	411	0.11%	0
Independent 2	28	36	39	9	29	18	17	39	15	18	9	257	0.07%	0
United Sinhala Great Council	20	11	13	3	8	38	11	12	8	27	8	159	0.04%	0
Independent 1	12	14	13	5	13	6	11	13	6	11	0	104	0.03%	0
Ruhuna People's Party	8	10	7	14	7	5	9	12	7	10	5	94	0.02%	0
Valid Votes	37,705	35,388	46,584	23,081	42,226	32,243	34,215	55,238	28,430	36,543	9,575	381,228	100.00%	23
Rejected Votes	2,196	1,986	3,038	1,240	2,755	1,886	2,043	4,003	1,836	2,129	521	23,633		
Total Polled	39,901	37,374	49,622	24,321	44,981	34,129	36,258	59,241	30,266	38,672	10,096	404,861		
Registered Electors	76,101	63,495	83,381	48,387	80,943	70,204	72,566	86,343	62,180	73,009		716,609		
Turnout	52.43%	58.86%	59.51%	50.26%	55.57%	48.61%	49.97%	68.61%	48.67%	52.97%		56.50%		

The following candidates were elected: Shan Wijayalal De Silva (UPFA), 59,826 preference votes (pv); Ariyathilaka Udalamattha Gamage Dayawansha (UPFA), 39,725 pv; Nishantha Muthuhettigamage (UPFA), 36,274 pv; Thithagalla Gamage Rathna (UPFA), 35,714 pv; Kolamba Thantreege Nishantha Perera (UPFA), 33,370 pv; Asela Naleenda Lal Naligama Hewage (UPFA), 33,008 pv; Kalinga Samithra De Silva (UPFA), 32,483 pv; Thotagamuwe Kankanmge Jayasundara (UPFA), 29,690 pv; Agampodi Mohan P. De Silva (UPFA), 29,103 pv; Iranipala Wijewantha (UPFA), 29,076 pv; Jayaweera Thommaya Hakuru (UPFA), 27,790 pv; Lal Bandula Bandarigoda (UNP), 24,675 pv; Abewickrama Ananda (UNP), 23,885 pv; Manusha Nanayakkara (UNP), 21,774 pv; Dhasilige Sunil Senanayaka (UNP), 21,731 pv; Wijepala Hettiarachchi (UNP), 21,675 pv; Asoka Dhanawansa De Silva Pettagam (UNP), 21,154 pv; Kaluarachchige Nanda Gunasinghe (UPFA), 21,068 pv; Angulugaha Gamage Chandradasa Piyasiri (UPFA), 21,051 pv; Sathendra Maithree Gunarathna (UNP), 20,503 pv; Ajith De Silva Ginihalgodage Ramba (UPFA), 19,780 pv; Ranjith Kumarage (UNP), 17,951 pv; and Jayasiri Nanayakkara (UNP), 16,550 pv.

== 2005 Presidential Election ==
Results of the 5th presidential election held on 17 November 2005 for the district:

Candidate	Party	Votes per Polling Division										Postal Votes	Total Votes	%
Candidate	Party	Akmee -mana	Ambalan -goda	Badde -gama	Bala- pitiya	Bentara Elpitiya	Galle	Habara -duwa	Hini- duma	Karan- deniya	Rat- gama	Postal Votes	Total Votes	%
Mahinda Rajapaksa	UPFA	36,424	30,418	40,558	20,743	38,779	24,972	35,002	42,304	31,157	34,259	12,617	347,233	58.41%
Ranil Wickremasinghe	UNP	24,570	20,093	27,764	15,460	25,767	27,166	22,164	31,489	17,438	21,330	6,079	239,320	40.26%
Siritunga Jayasuriya	USP	222	151	354	133	296	199	194	301	164	221	9	2,244	0.38%
A.A. Suraweera	NDF	211	170	350	125	268	104	233	354	179	176	3	2,173	0.37%
Victor Hettigoda	ULPP	107	59	112	34	100	85	80	112	73	64	47	873	0.15%
Chamil Jayaneththi	NLF	54	48	84	20	68	24	54	71	49	47	5	524	0.09%
Aruna de Soyza	RPP	43	49	68	36	64	23	47	82	60	41	4	517	0.09%
Wimal Geeganage	SLNF	39	42	78	26	70	28	48	60	42	32	4	469	0.08%
Anura De Silva	ULF	40	25	53	16	53	30	49	61	32	27	2	388	0.07%
A.K.J. Arachchige	DUA	27	25	40	19	41	23	35	39	29	25	2	305	0.05%
Wije Dias	SEP	20	19	27	28	15	11	19	29	17	31	5	221	0.04%
P. Nelson Perera	SLPF	17	4	28	8	17	11	18	16	8	9	0	136	0.02%
H.S. Dharmadwaja	UNAF	5	7	14	4	8	2	6	11	5	3	0	65	0.01%
Valid Votes		61,779	51,110	69,530	36,652	65,546	52,678	57,949	74,929	49,253	56,265	18,777	594,468	100.00%
Rejected Votes		560	509	699	291	572	520	495	654	481	498	261	5,540	
Total Polled		62,339	51,619	70,229	36,943	66,118	53,198	58,444	75,583	49,734	56,763	19,038	600,008	
Registered Electors		78,496	64,864	85,786	48,826	82,282	71,425	73,606	89,156	64,111	73,737		732,289	
Turnout		79.42%	79.58%	81.87%	75.66%	80.36%	74.48%	79.40%	84.78%	77.57%	76.98%		81.94%	

== 2009 Provincial Council Election ==
Results of the 6th Southern provincial council election held on 10 October 2009 for the district:

Party	Votes per Polling Division										Postal Votes	Total Votes	%	Seats
Party	Akmee -mana	Ambalan -goda	Badde -gama	Bala- pitiya	Bentara Elpitiya	Galle	Habara -duwa	Hini- duma	Karan- deniya	Rat- gama	Postal Votes	Total Votes	%	Seats
United People's Freedom Alliance (SLFP et al.)	34,615	34,260	42,191	22,392	40,299	23,647	33,258	47,372	30,932	34,449	10,585	354,000	68.34%	16
United National Party	17,979	10,890	17,020	7,690	13,454	18,823	14,555	16,200	9,606	11,564	2,394	140,175	27.06%	6
Janatha Vimukthi Peramuna	2,651	1,505	1,925	933	2,379	1,973	1,975	2,560	1,662	1,596	799	19,958	3.85%	1
Sri Lanka Muslim Congress	110	1	10	82	56	1,986	0	6	14	1	7	2,273	0.44%	0
United National Alliance	58	33	68	31	62	66	46	61	40	30	5	500	0.10%	0
United Socialist Party	69	21	44	21	39	52	29	48	16	24	3	366	0.07%	0
Independent 4	10	16	11	2	12	11	10	26	4	10	0	112	0.02%	0
Socialist Equality Party	2	12	5	28	5	6	3	3	3	28	0	95	0.02%	0
Left Front	12	4	29	6	10	13	8	8	1	0	1	92	0.02%	0
Janasetha Peramuna	4	6	9	3	5	14	23	7	4	12	2	89	0.02%	0
Independent 3	5	12	14	2	6	4	4	7	6	4	0	64	0.01%	0
United Lanka People's Party	8	4	5	2	6	4	8	10	4	6	0	57	0.01%	0
National People's Party	7	2	9	2	8	4	3	3	4	6	1	49	0.01%	0
Independent 2	6	5	7	3	5	6	1	5	4	3	1	46	0.01%	0
Independent 1	3	9	4	3	3	2	2	8	2	1	1	38	0.01%	0
Sri Lanka Progressive Front	5	1	2	0	3	11	2	6	5	2	1	38	0.01%	0
Sinhalaye Mahasammatha Bhoomiputra Pakshaya	3	5	1	0	2	6	7	4	2	4	2	36	0.01%	0
Ruhuna People's Party	6	4	3	0	3	0	2	1	0	2	0	21	0.00%	0
United Lanka Great Council	3	1	3	2	3	2	1	2	0	1	1	19	0.00%	0
Valid Votes	55,556	46,791	61,360	31,202	56,360	46,630	49,937	66,337	42,309	47,743	13,803	518,028	100.00%	23
Rejected Votes	2,099	1,986	3,249	1,166	2,659	1,574	2,046	2,991	1,764	2,141	277	21,952		
Total Polled	57,655	48,777	64,609	32,368	59,019	48,204	51,983	69,328	44,073	49,884	14,080	539,980		
Registered Electors	84,872	68,780	89,805	50,109	84,772	71,575	76,190	94,245	67,025	74,442		761,815		
Turnout	67.93%	70.92%	71.94%	64.60%	69.62%	67.35%	68.23%	73.56%	65.76%	67.01%		70.88%		

The following candidates were elected: Shan Wijayalal De Silva (UPFA), 90,294 preference votes (pv); Ihala Medagama Randima Preemal Gamage (UPFA), 77,418 pv; Nishantha Muthuhettigamage (UPFA), 71,718 pv; Sajin Vass Gunawardena (UPFA), 70,627 pv; Udalamatta Gamage Dayawansha Ariyathilaka (UPFA), 56,353 pv; A. Krishantha Pushpakumara Weerasinghe alias "Raththaran" (UNP), 52,371 pv; Agampodi Mohan P. De Silva (UPFA), 48,272 pv; Athukorala Kariyawasam Chaminda Sampath (UPFA), 42,300 pv; Ajith Prasanna Hewa Aluthsal Arachchige (UPFA), 38,762 pv; Manusha Nanayakkara (UNP), 38,477 pv; Angulugaha Gamage Chandradasa Piyasiri (UPFA), 30,678 pv; Anarkalli Aakarsha Jayatilaka (UPFA), 26,728 pv; Bandula Lal Bandarigoda (UNP), 24,891 pv; Baddegama Samitha (UPFA), 24,815 pv; T.D.S.L. Jayaweera (UPFA), 24,466 pv; Ananda Padmasiri Kariyawasam (UPFA), 24,206 pv; Amarapala Kahandapeelage (UPFA), 24,010 pv; Withanachchi Don Chamli Padmalal (UPFA), 22,771 pv; Lasantha Wijitha Kumara Wijenayaka (UPFA), 22,399 pv; Asoka Dhanawansa De Silva Pettagam (UNP), 21,674 pv; Wijepala Bopagoda Hettiarachchige (UNP), 19,470 pv; A. Akarawitage Gunarathna Maiththree (UNP), 17,920 pv; and Asela Naleenda Lal Naligama Hewage (JVP), 3,113 pv.

== 2010 Presidential Election ==
Results of the 6th presidential election held on 26 January 2010 for the district:

Candidate	Party	Votes per Polling Division										Postal Votes	Total Votes	%
Candidate	Party	Akmee -mana	Ambalan -goda	Badde -gama	Bala- pitiya	Bentara Elpitiya	Galle	Habara -duwa	Hini- duma	Karan- deniya	Rat- gama	Postal Votes	Total Votes	%
Mahinda Rajapaksa	UPFA	40,321	33,488	44,495	23,634	44,036	25,797	39,435	47,987	34,809	37,329	15,640	386,971	63.69%
Sarath Fonseka	NDF	24,345	19,191	24,446	12,198	20,219	27,625	18,606	26,061	13,420	17,617	7,905	211,633	34.83%
A.A. Suraweera	NDF	145	150	262	134	242	94	153	231	198	155	6	1,770	0.29%
M.C.M. Ismail	DUNF	114	79	168	71	141	75	150	227	91	125	15	1,256	0.21%
W.V. Mahiman Ranjith	Ind 1	91	93	135	59	123	64	93	186	118	105	13	1,080	0.18%
C.J. Sugathsiri Gamage	UDF	82	50	138	44	83	73	91	114	67	58	4	804	0.13%
A.S.P Liyanage	SLLP	79	37	83	32	78	37	66	111	57	44	3	627	0.10%
Ukkubanda Wijekoon	Ind 3	66	30	83	39	81	44	46	68	46	43	3	549	0.09%
Aithurus M. Illias	Ind 2	48	31	60	26	57	30	55	57	44	23	4	435	0.07%
Sarath Manamendra	NSH	32	27	63	27	33	35	43	76	28	30	3	397	0.07%
Siritunga Jayasuriya	USP	39	27	69	23	46	34	36	58	18	30	4	384	0.06%
Lal Perera	ONF	41	27	54	29	30	30	33	35	27	26	4	336	0.06%
Vikramabahu Karunaratne	LF	21	17	42	19	26	20	15	37	20	11	11	239	0.04%
M. K. Shivajilingam	Ind 5	10	4	38	10	23	17	18	30	9	9	0	168	0.03%
Wije Dias	SEP	19	19	22	24	12	10	13	11	3	20	4	157	0.03%
Senaratna de Silva	PNF	12	11	33	3	7	6	14	37	9	8	0	140	0.02%
Sanath Pinnaduwa	NA	9	19	21	4	12	7	15	21	10	8	0	126	0.02%
M. Mohamed Musthaffa	Ind 4	6	7	27	4	11	12	12	21	13	8	3	124	0.02%
Aruna de Soyza	RPP	12	6	14	2	16	10	8	28	14	9	1	120	0.02%
Battaramulla Seelarathana	JP	7	5	21	8	20	5	9	20	11	6	3	115	0.02%
M.B. Thaminimulla	ACAKO	16	7	16	5	15	11	4	18	7	2	0	101	0.02%
Sarath Kongahage	UNAF	11	9	12	6	9	2	8	19	5	6	2	89	0.01%
Valid Votes		65,526	53,334	70,302	36,401	65,320	54,038	58,923	75,453	49,024	55,672	23,628	607,621	100.00%
Rejected Votes		371	320	489	241	382	312	329	457	308	336	220	3,765	
Total Polled		65,897	53,654	70,791	36,642	65,702	54,350	59,252	75,910	49,332	56,008	23,848	611,386	
Registered Electors		84,872	68,780	89,805	50,109	84,772	71,575	76,190	94,245	67,025	74,442		761,815	
Turnout		77.64%	78.01%	78.83%	73.12%	77.50%	75.93%	77.77%	80.55%	73.60%	75.24%		80.25%	

== 2010 Parliamentary General Election ==
Results of the 14th parliamentary election held on 8 April 2010 for the district:

Party	Votes per Polling Division										Postal Votes	Total Votes	%	Seats
Party	Akmee -mana	Ambalan -goda	Badde -gama	Bala- pitiya	Bentara Elpitiya	Galle	Habara -duwa	Hini- duma	Karan- deniya	Rat- gama	Postal Votes	Total Votes	%	Seats
United People's Freedom Alliance (SLFP et al.	31,998	26,210	35,733	17,374	32,926	20,348	27,660	40,083	27,274	28,814	16,887	305,307	66.17%	7
United National Front (UNP, SLMC, DPF, SLFP(P))	13,062	8,926	14,119	7,295	12,592	14,804	10,644	15,616	8,688	9,729	4,626	120,101	26.03%	2
Democratic National Alliance (JVP et al.)	4,026	4,180	2,696	1,899	2,792	5,324	2,809	2,717	2,022	2,821	2,377	33,663	7.30%	1
Independent 6	44	57	55	26	48	47	25	47	32	39	7	427	0.09%	0
Sri Lanka National Front	12	6	27	29	51	5	12	5	157	18	8	330	0.07%	0
United Socialist Party	33	19	41	24	18	27	27	56	11	25	4	285	0.06%	0
National Development Front	41	16	38	12	33	16	19	41	30	19	3	268	0.06%	0
Independent 7	12	11	42	16	28	12	19	35	39	9	4	227	0.05%	0
United National Alternative Front	11	14	17	4	17	13	12	32	11	14	8	153	0.03%	0
Independent 5	12	9	26	3	5	10	9	16	9	10	0	109	0.02%	0
United Democratic Front	5	10	16	2	15	5	8	19	2	8	5	95	0.02%	0
Socialist Equality Party	6	15	2	24	6	2	4	8	3	20	3	93	0.02%	0
All Are Citizens, All Are Kings Organisation	2	3	1	12	12	3	2	5	25	2	4	71	0.02%	0
Janasetha Peramuna	9	20	4	2	6	0	3	6	4	2	4	60	0.01%	0
Independent 2	3	0	9	2	6	5	4	10	2	9	5	55	0.01%	0
United Lanka Great Council	3	0	6	0	1	3	5	6	7	1	5	37	0.01%	0
Sinhalaye Mahasammatha Bhoomiputra Pakshaya	3	3	2	1	5	2	0	5	5	2	2	30	0.01%	0
Independent 4	3	2	1	0	1	0	7	6	2	4	2	28	0.01%	0
Independent 3	2	2	2	0	0	1	1	12	3	0	2	25	0.01%	0
Independent 1	0	5	3	1	3	1	3	0	5	1	2	24	0.01%	0
Valid Votes	49,287	39,508	52,840	26,726	48,565	40,628	41,273	58,725	38,331	41,547	23,958	461,388	100.00%	10
Rejected Votes	2,036	2,160	3,577	1,277	2,611	1,744	2,410	3,657	1,677	2,037	827	24,013		
Total Polled	51,323	41,668	56,417	28,003	51,176	42,372	43,683	62,382	40,008	43,584	24,785	485,401		
Registered Electors	84,872	68,780	89,805	50,109	84,772	71,575	76,190	94,245	67,025	74,442		761,815		
Turnout	60.47%	60.58%	62.82%	55.88%	60.37%	59.20%	57.33%	66.19%	59.69%	58.55%		63.72%		

The following candidates were elected: Nishantha Muthuhettigama (UPFA), 125,777 preference votes (pv); Ramesh Pathirana (UPFA), 95,313 pv; Gunaratna Weerakoon (UPFA-SLFP), 68,629 pv; Chandima Weerakkody (UPFA-SLFP), 67,231 pv; Piyasena Gamage (UPFA-SLFP), 67,033 pv; Sajin Vass Gunawardena (UPFA), 53,989 pv; Gayantha Karunathilaka (UNF-UNP), 49,945 pv; Manusha Nanayakkara (UNF), 49,690 pv; Mohan Priyadarshana Silva (UPFA), 49,456 pv; and Ajith Kumara (DNA-JVP), 15,872 pv.

== 2015 Presidential election ==
Polling Divisions won by Rajapaksa
Polling Divisions won by Sirisena

Polling Division	Rajapaksa		Sirisena		Others		Total Valid		Turnout
Polling Division	Votes	%	Votes	%	Votes	%	Votes	%	Turnout
Akmeemana	39,604	52.77%	34,807	46.38%	643	0.85%	75,054	100.00%	80.48%
Ambalangoda	32,871	55.15%	26,187	43.93%	546	0.92%	59,604	100.00%	79.76%
Baddegama	43,369	56.57%	32,347	42.19%	951	1.24%	76,667	100.00%	81.15%
Balapitiya	23,283	58.45%	16,196	40.66%	352	0.88%	39,831	100.00%	76.10%
Bentara Elpitiya	42,015	59.08%	28,287	39.78%	808	1.13%	71,110	100.00%	80.09%
Galle	23,184	36.69%	39,547	62.58%	459	0.72%	63,190	100.00%	79.86%
Habaraduwa	38,028	58.86%	25,932	40.14%	643	1.00%	64,603	100.00%	80.68%
Hiniduma	47,464	57.58%	34,022	41.27%	942	1.14%	82,428	100.00%	82.59%
Karandeniya	34,983	63.13%	19,752	35.65%	675	1.22%	55,410	100.00%	77.10%
Ratgama	36,209	60.57%	23,038	38.54%	536	0.89%	59,783	100.00%	77.08%
Postal Votes	16,116	53.49%	13,879	46.06%	136	0.45%	30,131	100.00%	98.89%
Total	377,126	55.64%	293,994	43.37%	6,691	0.99%	677,811	100.00%	
