= Bentara Elpitiya Polling Division =

Bentara Elpitiya
- Polling Division
- Coordinates: 6.342381°N 80.116962°E
- Country: Sri Lanka
- Province: Southern Province, Sri Lanka
- Electoral District: Galle Electoral District

Area
  - Total: 235.87 km^{2} (91.07 sq mi)

Population (2012)
  - Total: 114,701
  - Density: 486/km^{2} (1,260/sq mi)
- ISO 3166 code: EC-07D

The Bentara Elpitiya Polling Division is a Polling Division in the Galle Electoral District, in the Southern Province, Sri Lanka.

== Presidential Election Results ==
=== Summary ===
The winner of Bentara Elpitiya has matched the final country result 6 out of 8 times. Hence, Bentara Elpitiya is a Weak Bellwether for Presidential Elections.

Year	Bentara Elpitiya	Galle Electoral District	MAE %	Sri Lanka	MAE %
2019	SLPP	SLPP	2.28%	SLPP	13.58%
2015	UPFA	UPFA	3.48%	NDF	11.37%
2010	UPFA	UPFA	3.73%	UPFA	9.21%
2005	UPFA	UPFA	0.82%	UPFA	8.88%
1999	PA	PA	0.80%	PA	4.70%
1994	PA	PA	0.99%	PA	0.25%
1988	SLFP	SLFP	3.35%	UNP	9.97%
1982	UNP	UNP	1.56%	UNP	4.48%
Matches/Mean MAE	6/8	6/8	2.12%	8/8	7.81%

=== 2019 Sri Lankan Presidential Election ===
Party	Bentara Elpitiya		Galle Electoral District		Sri Lanka	
Party	Votes	%	Votes	%	Votes	%
SLPP	49,734	66.70%	466,148	64.26%	6,924,255	52.25%
NDF	20,606	27.63%	217,401	29.97%	5,564,239	41.99%
NMPP	2,511	3.37%	27,006	3.72%	418,553	3.16%
Other Parties (with < 1%)	1,715	2.30%	14,803	2.04%	345,452	2.61%
Valid Votes	74,566	99.34%	725,358	99.20%	13,252,499	98.99%
Rejected Votes	499	0.66%	5,878	0.80%	135,452	1.01%
Total Polled	75,065	84.89%	731,236	85.15%	13,387,951	83.71%
Registered Electors	88,427		858,749		15,992,568	

=== 2015 Sri Lankan Presidential Election ===
Party	Bentara Elpitiya		Galle Electoral District		Sri Lanka	
Party	Votes	%	Votes	%	Votes	%
UPFA	42,015	59.08%	377,126	55.64%	5,768,090	47.58%
NDF	28,287	39.78%	293,994	43.37%	6,217,162	51.28%
Other Parties (with < 1%)	808	1.14%	6,691	0.99%	138,200	1.14%
Valid Votes	71,110	99.20%	677,811	99.05%	12,123,452	98.85%
Rejected Votes	574	0.80%	6,516	0.95%	140,925	1.15%
Total Polled	71,684	80.09%	684,327	80.46%	12,264,377	78.69%
Registered Electors	89,500		850,549		15,585,942	

=== 2010 Sri Lankan Presidential Election ===
Party	Bentara Elpitiya		Galle Electoral District		Sri Lanka	
Party	Votes	%	Votes	%	Votes	%
UPFA	44,036	67.42%	386,971	63.69%	6,015,934	57.88%
NDF	20,219	30.95%	211,633	34.83%	4,173,185	40.15%
Other Parties (with < 1%)	1,065	1.63%	9,017	1.48%	204,494	1.97%
Valid Votes	65,320	99.42%	607,621	99.38%	10,393,613	99.03%
Rejected Votes	382	0.58%	3,765	0.62%	101,838	0.97%
Total Polled	65,702	77.50%	611,386	77.82%	10,495,451	66.70%
Registered Electors	84,772		785,663		15,734,587	

=== 2005 Sri Lankan Presidential Election ===
Party	Bentara Elpitiya		Galle Electoral District		Sri Lanka	
Party	Votes	%	Votes	%	Votes	%
UPFA	38,779	59.16%	347,233	58.41%	4,887,152	50.29%
UNP	25,767	39.31%	239,320	40.26%	4,706,366	48.43%
Other Parties (with < 1%)	1,000	1.53%	7,915	1.33%	123,521	1.27%
Valid Votes	65,546	99.13%	594,468	99.08%	9,717,039	98.88%
Rejected Votes	572	0.87%	5,540	0.92%	109,869	1.12%
Total Polled	66,118	80.36%	600,008	79.86%	9,826,908	69.51%
Registered Electors	82,282		751,327		14,136,979	

=== 1999 Sri Lankan Presidential Election ===
Party	Bentara Elpitiya		Galle Electoral District		Sri Lanka	
Party	Votes	%	Votes	%	Votes	%
PA	31,626	55.68%	281,154	54.91%	4,312,157	51.12%
UNP	21,196	37.32%	195,906	38.26%	3,602,748	42.71%
JVP	3,128	5.51%	27,257	5.32%	343,927	4.08%
Other Parties (with < 1%)	845	1.49%	7,702	1.50%	176,679	2.09%
Valid Votes	56,795	98.29%	512,019	98.14%	8,435,754	97.69%
Rejected Votes	991	1.71%	9,716	1.86%	199,536	2.31%
Total Polled	57,786	76.77%	521,735	77.43%	8,635,290	72.17%
Registered Electors	75,271		673,785		11,965,536	

=== 1994 Sri Lankan Presidential Election ===
Party	Bentara Elpitiya		Galle Electoral District		Sri Lanka	
Party	Votes	%	Votes	%	Votes	%
PA	32,213	62.43%	285,398	61.40%	4,709,205	62.28%
UNP	18,747	36.33%	173,282	37.28%	2,715,283	35.91%
Other Parties (with < 1%)	640	1.24%	6,135	1.32%	137,040	1.81%
Valid Votes	51,600	98.52%	464,815	98.49%	7,561,526	98.03%
Rejected Votes	773	1.48%	7,112	1.51%	151,706	1.97%
Total Polled	52,373	72.98%	471,927	73.01%	7,713,232	69.12%
Registered Electors	71,765		646,373		11,158,880	

=== 1988 Sri Lankan Presidential Election ===
Party	Bentara Elpitiya		Galle Electoral District		Sri Lanka	
Party	Votes	%	Votes	%	Votes	%
SLFP	12,057	56.53%	148,615	53.09%	2,289,857	44.95%
UNP	8,789	41.21%	124,912	44.62%	2,569,199	50.43%
SLMP	481	2.26%	6,417	2.29%	235,701	4.63%
Valid Votes	21,327	98.62%	279,944	98.43%	5,094,754	98.24%
Rejected Votes	299	1.38%	4,461	1.57%	91,499	1.76%
Total Polled	21,626	32.97%	284,405	49.34%	5,186,256	55.87%
Registered Electors	65,597		576,390		9,283,143	

=== 1982 Sri Lankan Presidential Election ===
Party	Bentara Elpitiya		Galle Electoral District		Sri Lanka	
Party	Votes	%	Votes	%	Votes	%
UNP	23,668	49.33%	211,544	50.23%	3,450,815	52.93%
SLFP	21,805	45.45%	180,925	42.96%	2,546,348	39.05%
JVP	2,106	4.39%	20,962	4.98%	273,428	4.19%
Other Parties (with < 1%)	399	0.83%	7,707	1.83%	249,460	3.83%
Valid Votes	47,978	98.59%	421,138	98.78%	6,520,156	98.78%
Rejected Votes	686	1.41%	5,198	1.22%	80,470	1.22%
Total Polled	48,664	83.05%	426,336	81.84%	6,600,626	80.15%
Registered Electors	58,596		520,909		8,235,358	

== Parliamentary Election Results ==
=== Summary ===
The winner of Bentara Elpitiya has matched the final country result 5 out of 7 times. Hence, Bentara Elpitiya is a Weak Bellwether for Parliamentary Elections.

Year	Bentara Elpitiya	Galle Electoral District	MAE %	Sri Lanka	MAE %
2015	UPFA	UPFA	2.07%	UNP	6.61%
2010	UPFA	UPFA	1.22%	UPFA	5.50%
2004	UPFA	UPFA	1.54%	UPFA	6.07%
2001	PA	UNP	1.79%	UNP	4.78%
2000	PA	PA	1.25%	PA	3.41%
1994	PA	PA	0.84%	PA	5.68%
1989	UNP	UNP	1.54%	UNP	4.60%
Matches/Mean MAE	5/7	6/7	1.47%	7/7	5.24%

=== 2015 Sri Lankan Parliamentary Election ===
Party	Bentara Elpitiya		Galle Electoral District		Sri Lanka	
Party	Votes	%	Votes	%	Votes	%
UPFA	34,275	52.70%	312,518	50.07%	4,732,664	42.48%
UNP	26,559	40.84%	265,180	42.49%	5,098,916	45.77%
JVP	3,351	5.15%	37,778	6.05%	544,154	4.88%
Other Parties (with < 1%)	851	1.31%	8,659	1.39%	82,852	0.74%
Valid Votes	65,036	97.49%	624,135	97.63%	11,140,333	95.35%
Rejected Votes	1,664	2.49%	15,107	2.36%	516,926	4.42%
Total Polled	66,708	74.53%	639,318	78.00%	11,684,111	77.66%
Registered Electors	89,500		819,666		15,044,490	

=== 2010 Sri Lankan Parliamentary Election ===
Party	Bentara Elpitiya		Galle Electoral District		Sri Lanka	
Party	Votes	%	Votes	%	Votes	%
UPFA	32,926	67.80%	305,307	66.17%	4,846,388	60.38%
UNP	12,592	25.93%	120,101	26.03%	2,357,057	29.37%
DNA	2,792	5.75%	33,663	7.30%	441,251	5.50%
Other Parties (with < 1%)	255	0.53%	2,317	0.50%	32,313	0.40%
Valid Votes	48,565	94.90%	461,388	95.05%	8,026,322	96.03%
Rejected Votes	2,611	5.10%	24,013	4.95%	581,465	6.96%
Total Polled	51,176	60.37%	485,401	61.67%	8,358,246	59.29%
Registered Electors	84,772		787,139		14,097,690	

=== 2004 Sri Lankan Parliamentary Election ===
Party	Bentara Elpitiya		Galle Electoral District		Sri Lanka	
Party	Votes	%	Votes	%	Votes	%
UPFA	34,840	58.31%	306,385	56.58%	4,223,126	45.70%
UNP	22,243	37.23%	209,399	38.67%	3,486,792	37.73%
JHU	2,411	4.04%	22,826	4.22%	552,723	5.98%
Other Parties (with < 1%)	256	0.43%	2,901	0.54%	60,066	0.65%
Valid Votes	59,750	94.66%	541,511	94.69%	9,241,931	94.52%
Rejected Votes	3,369	5.34%	30,380	5.31%	534,452	5.47%
Total Polled	63,119	77.98%	571,891	79.81%	9,777,821	75.74%
Registered Electors	80,943		716,609		12,909,631	

=== 2001 Sri Lankan Parliamentary Election ===
Party	Bentara Elpitiya		Galle Electoral District		Sri Lanka	
Party	Votes	%	Votes	%	Votes	%
PA	26,732	44.50%	232,931	42.98%	3,330,815	37.19%
UNP	25,054	41.71%	238,989	44.10%	4,086,026	45.62%
JVP	7,296	12.15%	61,806	11.41%	815,353	9.10%
Other Parties (with < 1%)	986	1.64%	8,188	1.51%	143,033	1.60%
Valid Votes	60,068	95.52%	541,914	95.66%	8,955,844	94.77%
Rejected Votes	2,816	4.48%	24,561	4.34%	494,009	5.23%
Total Polled	62,884	79.63%	566,475	81.09%	9,449,878	76.03%
Registered Electors	78,967		698,558		12,428,762	

=== 2000 Sri Lankan Parliamentary Election ===
Party	Bentara Elpitiya		Galle Electoral District		Sri Lanka	
Party	Votes	%	Votes	%	Votes	%
PA	30,213	51.56%	264,601	50.08%	3,899,329	45.33%
UNP	22,811	38.93%	212,055	40.14%	3,451,765	40.12%
JVP	4,442	7.58%	41,620	7.88%	518,725	6.03%
Other Parties (with < 1%)	1,133	1.93%	10,072	1.91%	250,489	2.91%
Valid Votes	58,599	N/A	528,348	N/A	8,602,617	N/A

=== 1994 Sri Lankan Parliamentary Election ===
Party	Bentara Elpitiya		Galle Electoral District		Sri Lanka	
Party	Votes	%	Votes	%	Votes	%
PA	31,222	57.34%	277,956	56.39%	3,887,805	48.94%
UNP	22,059	40.51%	203,268	41.24%	3,498,370	44.04%
SLPF	940	1.73%	7,239	1.47%	90,078	1.13%
Other Parties (with < 1%)	226	0.42%	4,451	0.90%	69,351	0.87%
Valid Votes	54,447	95.75%	492,914	95.96%	7,943,688	95.20%
Rejected Votes	2,418	4.25%	20,763	4.04%	400,395	4.80%
Total Polled	56,865	79.24%	513,677	79.57%	8,344,095	74.75%
Registered Electors	71,765		645,559		11,163,064	

=== 1989 Sri Lankan Parliamentary Election ===
Party	Bentara Elpitiya		Galle Electoral District		Sri Lanka	
Party	Votes	%	Votes	%	Votes	%
UNP	18,482	48.12%	183,962	50.40%	2,838,005	50.71%
SLFP	15,849	41.26%	152,096	41.67%	1,785,369	31.90%
USA	3,465	9.02%	18,160	4.98%	141,983	2.54%
Other Parties (with < 1%)	616	1.60%	10,787	2.96%	360,219	6.44%
Valid Votes	38,412	92.42%	365,005	93.94%	5,596,468	93.87%
Rejected Votes	3,152	7.58%	23,536	6.06%	365,563	6.13%
Total Polled	41,564	64.41%	388,541	68.03%	5,962,031	63.60%
Registered Electors	64,529		571,146		9,374,164	

== Demographics ==
=== Ethnicity ===
The Bentara Elpitiya Polling Division has a Sinhalese majority (97.2%) . In comparison, the Galle Electoral District (which contains the Bentara Elpitiya Polling Division) has a Sinhalese majority (94.4%)

Ethnicity in Bentara Elpitiya
1. Sinhalese (97.2%)
2. Other (1.50%)
3. Sri Lankan Tamil (1.30%)

=== Religion ===
The Bentara Elpitiya Polling Division has a Buddhist majority (97.0%) . In comparison, the Galle Electoral District (which contains the Bentara Elpitiya Polling Division) has a Buddhist majority (93.9%)

Religion in Bentara Elpitiya
1. Buddhist (97.0%)
2. Hindu (1.40%)
3. Muslim (1.00%)
4. Other (0.60%)
