= Nishantha Perera =

Sri Lankan politician

Nishantha Perera is a Sri Lankan politician. He was elected to the Sri Lankan Parliament from Galle Electoral District as a member of the National People's Power.
