= Thilakaratne Withanachchi =

Sri Lankan politician

Hon. Thilakaratne Withanachchi MP

Member of Parliament for Galle District
- In office 2004–2010

Personal details
- Party: Janatha Vimukthi Peramuna

Thilakaratne Withanachchi is a Sri Lankan politician and a former member of the Parliament of Sri Lanka. He lost a re-election bid in 2010.
