= Piyasena Gamage =

Sri Lankan politician (born 1949)

Hon. Piyasena Gamage MP

Deputy Minister of Industrial Development and Constitutional Affairs
- In office 2000–2001

Minister of Skills Development, Vocational and Technical Education

Minister of Vocational and Technical Training

Minister of Indigenous Medicine
- In office 2010–2015

Member of Parliament for Galle District
- Incumbent
- Assumed office 2017
- In office 1989–2015

Personal details
- Born: January 10, 1949 (age 77)
- Party: Sri Lanka Freedom Party
- Other political affiliations: United People's Freedom Alliance

Ihala Medagama Piyasena Gamage (born 10 January 1949) is a Sri Lankan politician, a member of the Parliament of Sri Lanka and a government minister. He has been in parliament 1994, 2000, 2001, 2004, and 2010 from Galle district.

== See also ==
- Cabinet of Sri Lanka
