= 17th Parliament of Sri Lanka =

Current meeting of the Sri Lankan legislature

←	16th	18th	→
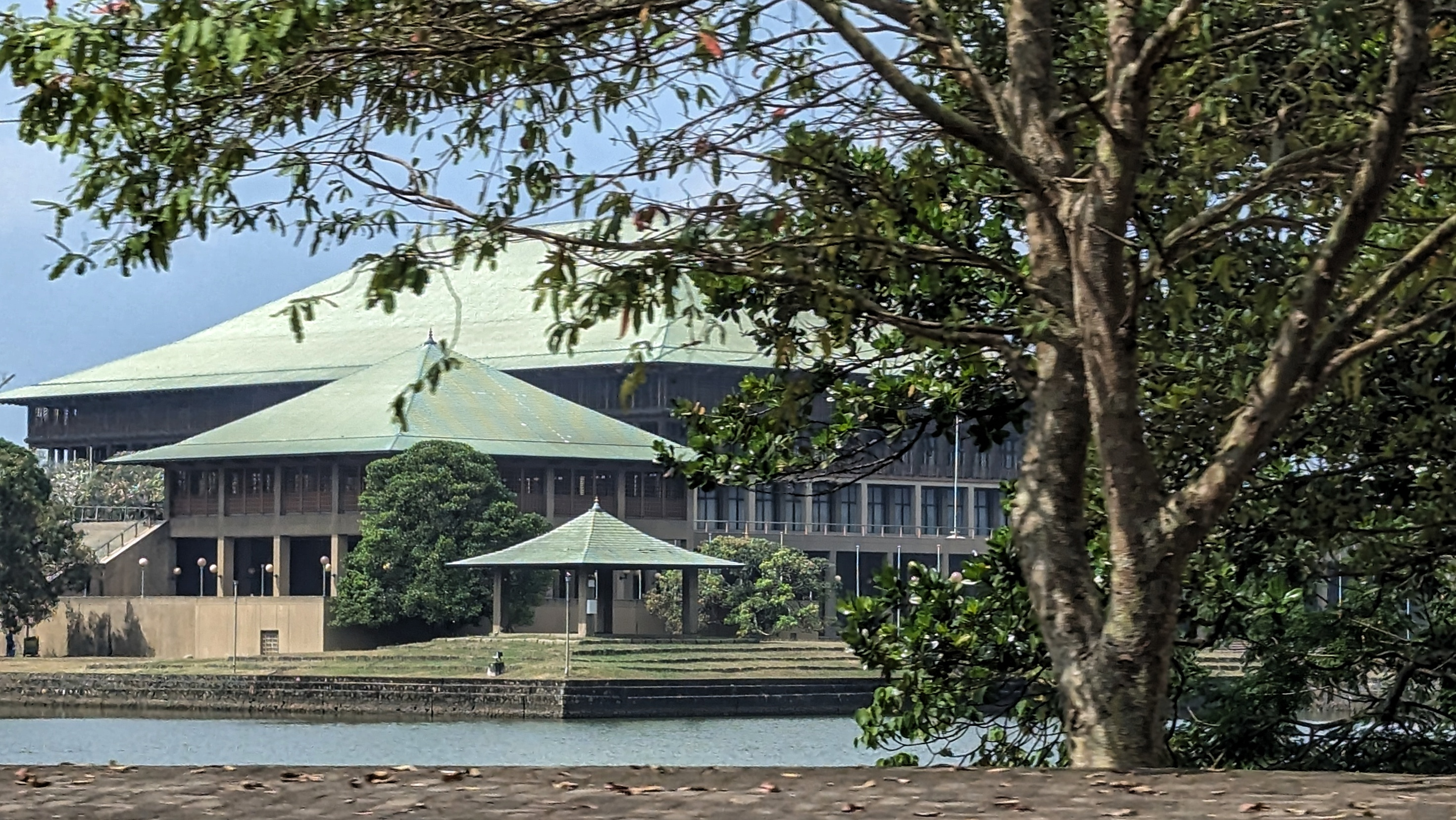
- Parliament of Sri Lanka

Overview
- Legislative body: Parliament of Sri Lanka
- Meeting place: Sri Lankan Parliament Building
- Term: 21 November 2024 –
- Election: 14 November 2024
- Website: parliament.lk

Parliamentarians
- Members: 225
- Speaker: Asoka Ranwala (NPP) (2024); Jagath Wickremerathna (NPP) (2024–)
- Deputy Speaker and Chairman of Committees: Rizvie Salih (NPP)
- Deputy Chairperson of Committees: Hemali Weerasekara (NPP)
- Prime Minister: Harini Amarasuriya (NPP)
- Leader of the Opposition: Sajith Premadasa (SJB)
- Leader of the House: Bimal Rathnayake (NPP)
- Chief Government Whip: Nalinda Jayatissa (NPP)
- Chief Opposition Whip: Gayantha Karunathilaka (SJB)

Structure

Sessions
- 1st: 21 November 2024 –

The 17th Parliament of Sri Lanka, known officially as the 10th Parliament of the Democratic Socialist Republic of Sri Lanka, is the current Parliament of Sri Lanka, with its membership determined by the results of the 2024 parliamentary election held on 14 November 2024. The parliament met for the first time on 21 November 2024.

According to the Constitution of Sri Lanka, the term of the Parliament is 5 years. However, under Article 70 of the Constitution and Section 10 of the Parliamentary Elections Act, No. 1 of 1981, the President of Sri Lanka may dissolve parliament after two years and six months from its first sitting or upon receiving a resolution from parliament. This signifies that the president will possess the constitutional authority to dissolve parliament by decree, effective from 21 May 2027.

== Timeline ==
Key dates
Date	Day	Event	Ref.
21 September 2024	Saturday	Anura Kumara Dissanayake is elected as president at the 2024 Sri Lankan presidential election.	
24 September 2024	Tuesday	President Dissanayake dissolved the 16th parliament and called for a parliamentary election.	
14 November 2024	Thursday	Election day.	
21 November 2024	Thursday	First meeting of the 17th parliament.; Formal election of the Speaker, Deputy Speaker and Deputy Chairperson of Committees.; Swearing in of the elected members.; Presentation of the government's policy statement by the President.	
13 December 2024	Friday	Asoka Ranwala resigns as Speaker of Parliament.	
17 December 2024	Tuesday	Jagath Wickramaratne unanimously elected as Speaker of Parliament.	

== Recent changes in seat allocations ==
Registered electors and seat allocation changes: 2020 to 2024
Province	Electoral district	Registered electors		Number of allocated seats		
Province	Electoral district	2020	2024	2020	2024	Change (+/-)
Western	Colombo	1,709,209	1,765,351	19	18	▼1
Western	Gampaha	1,785,964	1,881,129	18	19	▲1
Western	Kalutara	972,319	1,024,244	10	11	▲1
Central	Kandy	1,129,100	1,191,399	12	12	Steady
Central	Matale	407,569	429,991	5	5	Steady
Central	Nuwara Eliya	577,717	605,292	8	8	Steady
Southern	Galle	867,709	903,163	9	9	Steady
Southern	Matara	659,587	686,175	7	7	Steady
Southern	Hambantota	493,192	520,940	7	7	Steady
Northern	Jaffna	571,848	593,187	7	6	▼1
Northern	Vanni	287,024	306,081	6	6	Steady
Eastern	Batticaloa	409,808	449,686	5	5	Steady
Eastern	Ampara	513,979	555,432	7	7	Steady
Eastern	Trincomalee	288,868	315,925	4	4	Steady
North Western	Kurunegala	1,348,787	1,417,226	15	15	Steady
North Western	Puttalam	614,374	663,673	8	8	Steady
North Central	Anuradhapura	693,634	741,862	9	9	Steady
North Central	Polonnaruwa	331,109	351,302	5	5	Steady
Uva	Badulla	668,166	705,772	9	9	Steady
Uva	Monaragala	372,155	399,166	6	6	Steady
Sabaragamuwa	Ratnapura	877,582	923,736	11	11	Steady
Sabaragamuwa	Kegalle	684,189	709,622	9	9	Steady
National List	—N/a	—N/a	—N/a	29	29	Steady
Total	—N/a	16,263,885	17,140,354	225	225	Steady

== Election ==
Results by polling division

The National People's Power (NPP) secured a historic landslide victory in the parliamentary election, winning 61.65% of the popular vote and a supermajority of 159 seats—the largest number ever won by a single party in Sri Lanka's history. The NPP, led by newly elected President Anura Kumara Dissanayake, achieved the second-highest proportion of seats in the nation's history and won every district except Batticaloa. This marked the first election since 1977 where a single party obtained a supermajority, and the first time a non-Tamil political party won the Jaffna Electoral District.

The Samagi Jana Balawegaya (SJB) became the main opposition, securing 17.66% of the vote and 40 seats, a significant reduction. Other results included the Ilankai Tamil Arasu Kachchi (ITAK) winning 8 seats, the New Democratic Front (NDF) securing 5, and the Sri Lanka Podujana Peramuna (SLPP) suffering a drastic decline to just 3 seats from the 145 it held previously.

This election also set records for women's representation, with 21 female MPs elected, the highest in Sri Lanka's history, and saw over 150 first-time MPs entering the legislature.

The NPP nominated Sugath Wasantha de Silva through the national list to be appointed as a Member of Parliament. This marks a significant milestone in Sri Lankan politics, as de Silva is the first visually impaired person to be elected to parliament. A special seating arrangement will be made to accommodate his specific needs.

== Results ==
=== National ===
Party	Votes	%	Seats			
Party	Votes	%	District	National	Total	±
National People's Power (Note: Including the Janatha Vimukthi Peramuna.)	6,863,186	61.56	141	18	159	+156
Samagi Jana Balawegaya (Note: Alliance consisting of the All Ceylon Makkal Congress (which contested separately in one district, Ampara), the Freedom People's Congress, the Samagi Jana Balawegaya, the Sri Lanka Freedom Party (Dayasiri wing), the Sri Lanka Muslim Congress (which contested separately in two districts, Ampara and Batticaloa), and the Tamil Progressive Alliance (consisting of the National Union of Workers, the United Progressive Alliance, the Democratic People's Front and the Up-Country People's Front).)	1,968,716	17.66	35	5	40	−14
New Democratic Front (Note: Alliance consisting of the Ceylon Workers' Congress (which contested under the symbol of the United National Party in Nuwara Eliya), the Mahajana Eksath Peramuna, the National Unity Alliance, the National Congress, the New Lanka Freedom Party, the Sri Lanka Freedom Party (Nimal wing), the Sri Lanka Mahajana Pakshaya, the Sri Lanka Podujana Peramuna (pro-Ranil wing), and the United National Party.)	500,835	4.49	3	2	5	+5
Sri Lanka Podujana Peramuna	350,429	3.14	2	1	3	−97
Ilankai Tamil Arasu Kachchi	257,813	2.31	7	1	8	New
Sarvajana Balaya (Note: Alliance consisting of the Communist Party of Sri Lanka, the Independent MPs Forum, the Mawbima Janatha Pakshaya and the Pivithuru Hela Urumaya.)	178,006	1.60	0	1	1	+1
Sri Lanka Muslim Congress	87,038	0.78	2	1	3	+2
United Democratic Voice	83,488	0.75	0	0	0	New
United National Party	66,234	0.59	1	0	1	0
Democratic Tamil National Alliance (Note: Alliance consisting of the Eelam People's Revolutionary Liberation Front, the People's Liberation Organisation of Tamil Eelam and the Tamil Eelam Liberation Organization.)	65,382	0.59	1	0	1	New
Democratic Left Front	50,836	0.46	0	0	0	0
Democratic National Alliance	45,419	0.41	0	0	0	New
Tamil National People's Front (Note: The Tamil National People's Front contested under the name and symbol of the All Ceylon Tamil Congress.)	39,894	0.36	1	0	1	0
Tamil Makkal Viduthalai Pulikal	34,440	0.31	0	0	0	−1
All Ceylon Makkal Congress	33,911	0.30	1	0	1	0
People's Struggle Alliance (Note: Alliance consisting of the Frontline Socialist Party and the New Democratic Marxist–Leninist Party.)	29,611	0.27	0	0	0	0
Eelam People's Democratic Party	28,985	0.26	0	0	0	−2
Jaffna – Independent Group 17	30,637	0.27	1	0	1	+1
National Democratic Front	25,444	0.23	0	0	0	0
United National Alliance	22,548	0.20	0	0	0	New
Sri Lanka Labour Party	17,710	0.16	1	0	1	+1
Devana Parapura	16,950	0.15	0	0	0	New
Thamizh Makkal Koottani	13,295	0.12	0	0	0	New
Janasetha Peramuna	12,743	0.11	0	0	0	0
National Front for Good Governance	8,447	0.08	0	0	0	New
United National Freedom Front	7,796	0.07	0	0	0	New
Arunalu People's Front	7,666	0.07	0	0	0	New
New Independent Front	7,182	0.06	0	0	0	New
National People's Party	6,307	0.06	0	0	0	0
Our Power of People's Party	6,043	0.05	0	0	0	−1
Tamil United Liberation Front	5,061	0.05	0	0	0	0
Democratic United National Front	4,480	0.04	0	0	0	0
Samabima Party	4,449	0.04	0	0	0	New
Patriotic People's Power	3,985	0.04	0	0	0	New
Eros Democratic Front	2,865	0.03	0	0	0	New
Democratic Unity Alliance	2,198	0.02	0	0	0	0
Socialist Party of Sri Lanka	2,087	0.02	0	0	0	0
Jathika Sangwardhena Peramuna	1,920	0.02	0	0	0	0
United Socialist Party	1,838	0.02	0	0	0	0
Socialist Equality Party	864	0.01	0	0	0	0
Freedom People's Front	841	0.01	0	0	0	New
United Peace Alliance	822	0.01	0	0	0	0
Lanka Janatha Party	759	0.01	0	0	0	New
United Lanka People's Party	659	0.01	0	0	0	New
Liberal Democratic Party	635	0.01	0	0	0	New
New Lanka Freedom Party	601	0.01	0	0	0	New
Nava Sama Samaja Party	491	0.00	0	0	0	New
All Ceylon Tamil Mahasabha	450	0.00	0	0	0	0
Democratic Party	283	0.00	0	0	0	New
Sri Lanka Mahajana Pakshaya	269	0.00	0	0	0	New
Independents	245,458	2.20	0	0	0	0
Total	11,148,006	100.00	196	29	225	0
Valid votes	11,148,006	94.35				
Invalid/blank votes	667,240	5.65				
Total votes	11,815,246	100.00				
Registered voters/turnout	17,140,354	68.93				
Source: Election Commission of Sri Lanka

=== District ===
Districts won by NPP
Districts won by ITAK

District results for the 2024 Sri Lankan parliamentary election
Province	Electoral District	NPP			SJB			ITAK			NDF			SLPP			Others			Total			Turnout
Province	Electoral District	Votes	%	Seats	Votes	%	Seats	Votes	%	Seats	Votes	%	Seats	Votes	%	Seats	Votes	%	Seats	Total Polled	Registered Electors	Seats	Turnout
Western	Colombo	788,636	68.63%	14	208,249	18.12%	4	–	–	–	51,020	4.44%	–	34,880	3.04%	–	66,340	5.47%	–	1,211,738	1,765,351	18	68.64%
Western	Gampaha	898,759	72.76%	16	150,445	12.18%	3	–	–	–	47,512	3.85%	–	49,516	4.01%	–	89,080	7.20%	–	1,306,952	1,881,129	19	69.48%
Western	Kalutara	452,398	66.09%	8	128,932	18.84%	2	–	–	–	34,257	5.00%	1	27,072	3.96%	–	41,833	6.11%	–	721,461	1,024,244	11	70.44%
Central	Kandy	500,596	64.60%	9	145,939	18.83%	2	–	–	–	50,889	6.57%	1	15,762	2.03%	–	61,729	7.97%	–	61,012	1,191,399	12	70.16%
Central	Matale	181,678	66.16%	4	53,200	19.37%	1	–	–	–	13,353	4.86%	–	10,150	3.70%	–	16,220	5.91%	–	297,238	429,991	5	69.13%
Central	Nuwara Eliya	161,167	41.57%	5	101,589	26.21%	2	–	–	–	–	–	–	6,123	1.58%	–	118,686	30.64%	1	429,851	605,292	8	71.02%
Southern	Galle	406,428	68.07%	7	93,486	15.66%	1	–	–	–	30,453	5.10%	–	31,201	5.23%	1	35,523	8.94%	–	620,165	903,163	9	68.67%
Southern	Matara	317,541	69.83%	6	74,475	16.38%	1	–	–	–	31,009	6.82%	–	9,432	2.07%	–	22,277	4.90%	–	476,407	686,175	7	69.43%
Southern	Hambantota	234,083	66.38%	5	52,170	14.79%	1	–	–	–	18,297	5.19%	–	26,268	7.45%	1	17,039	6.19%	–	369,700	520,940	7	70.97%
Northern	Jaffna	80,830	24.85%	3	15,276	4.70%	–	63,327	19.47%	1	–	–	–	582	0.18%	–	165,297	50.80%	2	358,079	593,187	6	60.37%
Northern	Vanni	39,894	20.37%	2	32,232	16.45%	1	29,711	15.17%	1	–	–	–	805	0.41%	–	93,244	52.88%	2	211,140	306,081	6	68.98%
Eastern	Batticaloa	55,498	19.33%	1	22,570	7.86%	–	96,975	33.78%	3	559	0.19%	–	263	0.09%	–	111,188	38.75%	1	302,382	449,686	5	67.24%
Eastern	Ampara	146,313	40.32%	4	32,320	8.91%	–	33,632	9.27%	1	33,544	9.24%	–	6,654	1.83%	–	110,461	30.43%	2	380,523	555,432	7	68.51%
Eastern	Trincomalee	87,031	42.48%	2	53,058	25.90%	1	34,168	16.68%	1	9,387	4.58%	–	1,399	0.68%	–	19,845	9.68%	–	218,425	315,925	4	69.14%
North Western	Kurunegala	651,476	69.56%	12	189,394	20.22%	3	–	–	–	30,073	3.21%	–	35,236	3.76%	–	30,436	3.25%	–	978,927	1,417,226	15	69.07%
North Western	Puttalam	239,576	63.10%	6	65,679	17.30%	2	–	–	–	15,741	4.15%	–	14,624	3.85%	–	44,061	11.60%	–	410,853	663,673	8	61.91%
North Central	Anuradhapura	331,692	67.22%	7	98,176	19.90%	2	–	–	–	29,961	6.07%	–	11,248	2.28%	–	29,115	4.53%	–	522,533	741,862	9	70.44%
North Central	Polonnaruwa	159,010	68.67%	4	43,822	18.92%	1	–	–	–	5,153	2.23%	–	4,646	2.01%	–	19,928	8.17%	–	240,145	351,302	5	68.36%
Uva	Badulla	275,180	58.59%	6	102,958	21.92%	2	–	–	–	36,450	7.76%	1	11,255	2.40%	–	43,863	9.33%	–	503,724	705,772	9	71.37%
Uva	Monaragala	174,730	64.27%	5	62,014	22.81%	1	–	–	–	10,697	3.93%	–	11,624	4.28%	–	12,791	4.71%	–	12,991	399,166	6	71.36%
Sabaragamuwa	Ratnapura	368,229	61.75%	8	133,041	22.31%	3	–	–	–	26,171	4.39%	–	29,316	4.92%	–	39,613	6.63%	–	633,440	923,736	11	68.57%
Sabaragamuwa	Kegalle	312,441	64.80%	7	109,691	22.75%	2	–	–	–	26,309	5.46%	–	12,373	2.57%	–	21,337	4.42%	–	500,789	709,622	9	70.57%
National List		—N/a		18	—N/a		5	—N/a		1	—N/a		2	—N/a		1	—N/a		2	—N/a		29	—N/a
Total		6,863,186	61.56%	159	1,968,716	17.66%	40	257,813	2.31%	8	500,835	4.49%	5	350,429	3.14%	3	1,207,027	10.22%	10	11,815,246	17,140,354	225	68.93%

== Presiding officers and parliamentary leaders ==
Bimal Rathnayake and Nalinda Jayatissa of the National People's Power (NPP) were appointed as Leader of the House and Chief Government Whip, respectively, on 19 November 2024 by the President.

At the inaugural meeting of the new parliament on 21 November 2024, Asoka Ranwala, Rizvie Salih, and Hemali Weerasekara were unanimously elected as Speaker, Deputy Speaker and Chairman of Committees, and Deputy Chairperson of Committees, respectively. Sajith Premadasa of the Samagi Jana Balawegaya (SJB) was recognised as the Leader of the Opposition. On 3 December 2023, Gayantha Karunathilaka of the SJB was recognised by the Speaker as the Chief Opposition Whip.

In December 2024, questions about the authenticity of Asoka Ranwala's educational qualifications sparked widespread calls for clarification from academics, officials, politicians, and the public. Amidst the growing controversy, Ranwala resigned as Speaker of Parliament on 13 December 2024.

On 17 December 2024, Jagath Wickremerathna was unanimously elected as the next Speaker of Parliament.

== Government ==
The National People's Power (NPP), having secured a supermajority with 159 seats, formed the next government of Sri Lanka. The new cabinet of ministers, sworn in on 18 November 2024, includes 21 members elected in the recent parliamentary election, along with the president, who will retain the portfolios of defence, finance, and digital economy. This was carried out in accordance with Articles 42 to 47 of the Constitution. Harini Amarasuriya will continue as the prime minister, in addition to her ministerial portfolio of education, higher education and vocational education. On 25 November 2024, the president, through a Gazette Extraordinary notification, assigned subjects, functions, departments, statutory institutions, and public corporations to the respective ministries.

On 21 November 2024, 29 MPs were sworn in as deputy ministers. Anil Jayantha Fernando, the Cabinet Minister for Labour, was assigned the additional role of Deputy Minister for Economic Development alongside his existing responsibilities.

On 10 October 2025, President Dissanayake carried out a ministerial reshuffle that included new appointments and changes affecting three cabinet ministers and ten deputy ministers. The number of cabinet members, including the president, increased from 22 to 23, while the number of deputy ministers rose from 29 to 32.

On 17 April 2026, Kumara Jayakody resigned from his position as the minister of energy to facilitate an impartial and independent inquiry into controversial coal imports. On 20 April 2026, Anura Karunathilake was appointed to fill the vacancy created in addition to his current ministerial responsibilities.

== Government budget and policy statement ==
=== 2024 ===
The new government's first policy statement was presented to the parliament on 21 November 2024 by the president. A debate on the government's policy statement took place from 3 to 5 December 2024 and was passed unanimously.

On 5 December 2024, an interim vote on account was presented to parliament, initiating the debate. Following the conclusion of the debate, the vote on account was passed without a formal vote on 6 December 2024.

=== 2025 ===
On 9 January 2025, the prime minister presented the 2025 Appropriation Bill to Parliament, outlining the government's proposed expenditure for the financial year from 1 January to 31 December 2025. This marked the bill's first reading. The second reading, also known as the budget speech, was delivered by the president on 17 February. On 21 March 2025, Parliament passed the budget at its third reading, with amendments, by a majority of 114 votes, with 159 votes in favour and 45 against.

On 26 September 2025, the government presented the 2026 Appropriation Bill to Parliament. The second reading was delivered on 7 November by the president and was passed on 14 November by a majority of 118, with 160 MPs voting in favour and 42 voting against. The third reading of the bill was passed on 5 December 2025 with a majority of 157 votes with 158 MPs voting in favour and 1 voting against.

On 18 December 2025, the government presented a supplementary estimate of Rs. 500 billion, approximately US$1.615 billion, to assist individuals affected by Cyclone Ditwah and to rebuild damaged infrastructure. Parliament debated the estimate on 19 December and approved it unanimously.

== Members ==
=== Deaths and resignations ===
- 14 March 2025 – M. S. Naleem (SLMC/NAT) resigned, replaced by Abdul Wazeeth on 8 July.
- 6 April 2025 – Kosala Jayaweera (NPP/KEG) died, replaced by Samantha Ranasinghe on 8 May.
- 20 June 2025 – Harshana Suriyapperuma (NPP/NAT) resigned, replaced by Nishantha Jayaweera on 9 July.
- 28 November 2025 – Muhammedu Ismail (SJB/NAT) resigned, replaced by Marrikkar Mohamed Thahir on 5 December.
- 14 September 2026 – Abdul Wazeeth (SLMC/NAT) resigned, replaced by Habeeb Rifan on 24 September.

=== List ===
Members of the 17th Parliament of Sri Lanka
Name	District	Pref. Votes	Member From	Member To	Elected Alliance	Current Alliance	Notes
Harini Amarasuriya	COL	655,289	21 November 2024		NPP	NPP	Prime Minister; Minister of Education, Higher Education and Vocational Education
Chathuranga Abeysinghe	COL	127,166	21 November 2024		NPP	NPP	Deputy Minister of Industries and Entrepreneurship Development
Sunil Watagala	COL	125,700	21 November 2024		NPP	NPP	Deputy Minister of Public Security and Parliamentary Affairs
Lakshman Nipuna Arachchi	COL	96,273	21 November 2024		NPP	NPP	
Aruna Panagoda	COL	91,081	21 November 2024		NPP	NPP	
Eranga Gunasekara	COL	85,180	21 November 2024		NPP	NPP	Deputy Minister of Youth Affairs (21 November 2024 – 10 October 2025); Deputy Minister of Urban Development (since 10 October 2025)
Harshana Nanayakkara	COL	82,275	21 November 2024		NPP	NPP	Minister of Justice and National Integration
Kaushalya Ariyarathne	COL	80,814	21 November 2024		NPP	NPP	Deputy Minister of Mass Media (since 10 October 2025)
Asitha Niroshana	COL	78,990	21 November 2024		NPP	NPP	
Rizvie Salih	COL	73,018	21 November 2024		NPP	NPP	Deputy Speaker and Chairman of Committees
Susantha Dodawatta	COL	65,391	21 November 2024		NPP	NPP	
Chandana Sooriyaarachchi	COL	63,387	21 November 2024		NPP	NPP	
Samanmalee Gunasinghe	COL	59,657	21 November 2024		NPP	NPP	
Dewananda Suraweera	COL	54,680	21 November 2024		NPP	NPP	
Sajith Premadasa	COL	145,611	21 November 2024		SJB	SJB	Leader of the Opposition
Harsha de Silva	COL	81,473	21 November 2024		SJB	SJB	
Mujibur Rahman	COL	43,737	21 November 2024		SJB	SJB	
Saidulla Marikkar	COL	41,482	21 November 2024		SJB	SJB	
Vijitha Herath	GAM	716,715	21 November 2024		NPP	NPP	Minister of Foreign Affairs, Foreign Employment and Tourism
Anil Jayantha Fernando	GAM	162,433	21 November 2024		NPP	NPP	Minister of Labour; Deputy Minister of Economic Development (21 November 2024 – 10 October 2025); Deputy Minister of Finance and Planning (since 10 October 2025)
Mahinda Jayasinghe	GAM	137,315	21 November 2024		NPP	NPP	Deputy Minister of Labour
Chrishantha Abeysena	GAM	121,825	21 November 2024		NPP	NPP	Minister of Science and Technology
Muneer Mulaffer	GAM	109,815	21 November 2024		NPP	NPP	Deputy Minister of National Integrity (21 November 2024 – 10 October 2025); Deputy Minister of Religious and Cultural Affairs (since 10 October 2025)
Asoka Ranwala	GAM	109,332	21 November 2024		NPP	NPP	Speaker of the Parliament (21 November – 13 December 2024) (Note: Asoka Ranwala resigned as Speaker of Parliament on 13 December 2024 over a controversy regarding educational qualifications.)
Dharmappriya Wijesinghe	GAM	83,061	21 November 2024		NPP	NPP	
Ruwan Mapalagama	GAM	78,673	21 November 2024		NPP	NPP	
Lasith Bashana	GAM	74,058	21 November 2024		NPP	NPP	
Prageeth Maduranga	GAM	70,887	21 November 2024		NPP	NPP	
Champika Hettiarachchi	GAM	70,373	21 November 2024		NPP	NPP	
Ruwanthilake Jayakodi	GAM	68,210	21 November 2024		NPP	NPP	
Hemali Weerasekara	GAM	66,737	21 November 2024		NPP	NPP	Deputy Chairperson of Committees
Upul Abeywickrama	GAM	60,595	21 November 2024		NPP	NPP	
Stephani Fernando	GAM	57,634	21 November 2024		NPP	NPP	
Chaminda Lalith Kumara	GAM	53,451	21 November 2024		NPP	NPP	
Harshana Rajakaruna	GAM	67,004	21 November 2024		SJB	SJB	
Kavinda Jayawardena	GAM	37,595	21 November 2024		SJB	SJB	
Prasad Siriwardana	GAM	23,699	21 November 2024		SJB	SJB	
Nalinda Jayatissa	KAL	371,640	21 November 2024		NPP	NPP	Chief Government Whip; Minister of Health and Mass Media
Nilanthi Kottahachchi	KAL	131,375	21 November 2024		NPP	NPP	
Nihal Abeysinghe	KAL	96,721	21 November 2024		NPP	NPP	
Sanjeewa Ranasinghe	KAL	78,832	21 November 2024		NPP	NPP	
Dhanushka Ranganath	KAL	74,502	21 November 2024		NPP	NPP	
Oshani Umanga	KAL	69,232	21 November 2024		NPP	NPP	
Chandima Hettiaratchi	KAL	50,509	21 November 2024		NPP	NPP	
Nandana Padmakumara	KAL	50,452	21 November 2024		NPP	NPP	
Ajith Perera	KAL	43,975	21 November 2024		SJB	SJB	
Jagath Vithana	KAL	43,867	21 November 2024		SJB	SJB	
Rohitha Abeygunawardena	KAL	10,204	21 November 2024		NDF	NDF	
K. D. Lalkantha	KAN	316,951	21 November 2024		NPP	NPP	Minister of Agriculture, Livestock Development, Land and Irrigation
Jagath Manuwarna	KAN	128,678	21 November 2024		NPP	NPP	
Prasanna Gunasena	KAN	94,242	21 November 2024		NPP	NPP	Deputy Minister of Transport and Highways
Hansaka Wijemuni	KAN	82,926	21 November 2024		NPP	NPP	Deputy Minister of Health and Mass Media (21 November 2024 – 10 October 2025); Deputy Minister of Health (since 10 October 2025)
Thanura Dissanayake	KAN	78,526	21 November 2024		NPP	NPP	
E. M. Basnayaka	KAN	72,929	21 November 2024		NPP	NPP	
Riyaz Faruk	KAN	64,043	21 November 2024		NPP	NPP	
Thushari Jayasinghe	KAN	58,223	21 November 2024		NPP	NPP	
Mohomed Pasmin	KAN	57,716	21 November 2024		NPP	NPP	
Rauff Hakeem	KAN	30,883	21 November 2024		SJB	SJB	
Chamindrani Kiriella	KAN	30,780	21 November 2024		SJB	SJB	
Anuradha Jayaratne	KAN	20,749	21 November 2024		NDF	NDF	
Gamagedara Dissanayake	MTL	100,618	21 November 2024		NPP	NPP	Deputy Minister of Buddha Sasana, Religious and Cultural Affairs
Sunil Biyanvila	MTL	56,932	21 November 2024		NPP	NPP	
Deepthi Wasalage	MTL	47,482	21 November 2024		NPP	NPP	
Dinesh Hemantha Perera	MTL	43,455	21 November 2024		NPP	NPP	
Rohini Kumari Wijerathna	MTL	27,495	21 November 2024		SJB	SJB	
Manjula Suraweera Arachchi	NUW	78,832	21 November 2024		NPP	NPP	
Madhura Senevirathna	NUW	52,546	21 November 2024		NPP	NPP	Deputy Minister of Education and Higher Education
R. G. Wijerathna	NUW	39,006	21 November 2024		NPP	NPP	
Anushka Thilakarathne	NUW	34,035	21 November 2024		NPP	NPP	
Krishnan Kaleichelvi	NUW	33,346	21 November 2024		NPP	NPP	
Palani Digambaran	NUW	48,018	21 November 2024		SJB	SJB	
Velusami Radhakrishnan	NUW	42,273	21 November 2024		SJB	SJB	
Jeevan Thondaman	NUW	46,438	21 November 2024		UNP	UNP	
Nalin Hewage	GAL	274,707	21 November 2024		NPP	NPP	Deputy Minister of Vocational Education
Rathna Gamage	GAL	113,719	21 November 2024		NPP	NPP	Deputy Minister of Fisheries, Aquatic and Ocean Resources
Nayanathara Premathilake	GAL	82,058	21 November 2024		NPP	NPP	
Nishantha Samaraweera	GAL	76,677	21 November 2024		NPP	NPP	
Thilanka Rukmal	GAL	74,143	21 November 2024		NPP	NPP	
Nishantha Perera	GAL	71,549	21 November 2024		NPP	NPP	
T. K. Jayasundara	GAL	58,761	21 November 2024		NPP	NPP	
Gayantha Karunathilaka	GAL	36,093	21 November 2024		SJB	SJB	Chief Opposition Whip
Chanaka Sampath	GAL	8,447	21 November 2024		SLPP	SLPP	
Sunil Handunnetti	MTR	249,251	21 November 2024		NPP	NPP	Minister of Industries and Entrepreneurship Development
Saroja Savithri Paulraj	MTR	148,379	21 November 2024		NPP	NPP	Minister of Women and Child Affairs
L. M. Abeywickrama	MTR	68,144	21 November 2024		NPP	NPP	
Akram Ilyas	MTR	53,835	21 November 2024		NPP	NPP	Deputy Minister of Energy (since 10 October 2025)
Gammaddage Ajantha	MTR	48,820	21 November 2024		NPP	NPP	
Lal Premanath	MTR	48,797	21 November 2024		NPP	NPP	
Chathura Galappaththi	MTR	32,196	21 November 2024		SJB	SJB	
Nihal Galappaththi	HAM	125,983	21 November 2024		NPP	NPP	
Athula Hewage	HAM	73,198	21 November 2024		NPP	NPP	
Saliya Madarasinghe	HAM	65,969	21 November 2024		NPP	NPP	
Aravinda Vitharana	HAM	48,807	21 November 2024		NPP	NPP	Deputy Minister of Lands and Irrigation (since 10 October 2025)
Prabha Senarath	HAM	42,249	21 November 2024		NPP	NPP	Deputy Minister of Provincial Councils and Local Government
Dilip Wedaarachchi	HAM	23,514	21 November 2024		SJB	SJB	
D. V. Chanaka	HAM	16,546	21 November 2024		SLPP	SLPP	
Karunananthan Ilankumaran	JAF	32,102	21 November 2024		NPP	NPP	
Sri Bhavanandaraja Shanmuganathan	JAF	20,430	21 November 2024		NPP	NPP	
Rajeewan Jayachandramurthy	JAF	17,579	21 November 2024		NPP	NPP	
Sivagnanam Shritharan	JAF	32,833	21 November 2024		ITAK	ITAK	
Gajendrakumar Ponnambalam	JAF	15,135	21 November 2024		TNPF	TNPF	
Ramanathan Archchuna	JAF	20,487	21 November 2024		IG-17	IG-17	
Selvathambi Thilakanathan	VAN	10,652	21 November 2024		NPP	NPP	
Arumugam Jegadishwaran	VAN	9,280	21 November 2024		NPP	NPP	
Rishad Bathiudeen	VAN	21,018	21 November 2024		SJB	SJB	
T. Raviharan	VAN	11,215	21 November 2024		ITAK	ITAK	
Amirthanathan Adaikalanathan	VAN	5,695	21 November 2024		DTNA	DTNA	
Kader Masthan	VAN	13,511	21 November 2024		SLLP	SLLP	
Shanakiya Rasamanickam	BAT	65,458	21 November 2024		ITAK	ITAK	
G. Sirinesan	BAT	22,773	21 November 2024		ITAK	ITAK	
Ilaiyathambi Srinath	BAT	21,202	21 November 2024		ITAK	ITAK	
M. L. A. M. Hizbullah	BAT	32,410	21 November 2024		SLMC	SLMC	
Kandasami Prabhu	BAT	14,856	21 November 2024		NPP	NPP	
Wasantha Piyathissa	AMP	71,120	21 November 2024		NPP	NPP	Deputy Minister of Rural Development, Social Security and Community Empowerment
Manjula Ratnayake	AMP	50,838	21 November 2024		NPP	NPP	
Priyantha Wijeratne	AMP	41,313	21 November 2024		NPP	NPP	
Muthumenike Rathwatte	AMP	32,145	21 November 2024		NPP	NPP	
M. M. Thahir	AMP	14,511	21 November 2024		ACMC	ACMC	
Meerasahibu Uthumalebbe	AMP	13,016	21 November 2024		SLMC	SLMC	
K. Kodeeswaran	AMP	11,962	21 November 2024		ITAK	ITAK	
Arun Hemachandra	TRI	38,368	21 November 2024		NPP	NPP	Deputy Minister of Foreign Affairs and Foreign Employment
Roshan Akmeemana	TRI	25,814	21 November 2024		NPP	NPP	
Imran Maharoof	TRI	22,779	21 November 2024		SJB	SJB	
K. S. Kugathasan	TRI	18,470	21 November 2024		ITAK	ITAK	
M. D. Namal Karunaratne	KUR	356,969	21 November 2024		NPP	NPP	Deputy Minister of Agriculture and Livestock
Ananda Wijepala	KUR	133,142	21 November 2024		NPP	NPP	Minister of Public Security and Parliamentary Affairs
Sujeeva Dissanayake	KUR	109,979	21 November 2024		NPP	NPP	
Wijesiri Basnayake	KUR	86,218	21 November 2024		NPP	NPP	
Geetha Herath	KUR	84,414	21 November 2024		NPP	NPP	
Namal Sudarshana	KUR	83,418	21 November 2024		NPP	NPP	Deputy Minister of Women and Child Affairs
Jagath Gunawardena	KUR	81,864	21 November 2024		NPP	NPP	
Ashoka Gunasena	KUR	72,216	21 November 2024		NPP	NPP	
G. D. Suriyabandara	KUR	72,198	21 November 2024		NPP	NPP	
Chandana Tennakoon	KUR	70,038	21 November 2024		NPP	NPP	
Dharmapriya Dissanayake	KUR	68,580	21 November 2024		NPP	NPP	
Mahammadu Aslam	KUR	67,436	21 November 2024		NPP	NPP	
Nalin Bandara	KUR	58,971	21 November 2024		SJB	SJB	
Dayasiri Jayasekara	KUR	51,402	21 November 2024		SJB	SJB	
J. C. Alawathuwala	KUR	46,915	21 November 2024		SJB	SJB	
Chandana Abayarathna	PUT	113,334	21 November 2024		NPP	NPP	Minister of Public Administration, Provincial Councils and Local Government
Ajith Gihan	PUT	58,183	21 November 2024		NPP	NPP	
Gayan Janaka	PUT	51,233	21 November 2024		NPP	NPP	
Hiruni Wijesinghe	PUT	44,057	21 November 2024		NPP	NPP	
Anton Jayakody	PUT	43,907	21 November 2024		NPP	NPP	Deputy Minister of Environment
Mohamed Faisal	PUT	42,939	21 November 2024		NPP	NPP	
Hector Appuhamy	PUT	25,755	21 November 2024		SJB	SJB	
Janath Chithral Fernando	PUT	18,916	21 November 2024		SJB	SJB	
Wasantha Samarasinghe	ANU	251,639	21 November 2024		NPP	NPP	Minister of Trade, Commerce, Food Security and Cooperative Development
Sena Nanayakkara	ANU	86,150	21 November 2024		NPP	NPP	
Susil Ranasinghe	ANU	72,508	21 November 2024		NPP	NPP	Deputy Minister of Land and Irrigation (21 November 2024 – 10 October 2025); Minister of Housing, Construction and Water Supply (since 10 October 2025)
Susantha Kumara	ANU	71,965	21 November 2024		NPP	NPP	
Bhagya Sri Herath	ANU	63,551	21 November 2024		NPP	NPP	
P. D. N. K. Palihena	ANU	52,507	21 November 2024		NPP	NPP	
Thilina Samarakoon	ANU	49,730	21 November 2024		NPP	NPP	
Rohana Bandara	ANU	46,399	21 November 2024		SJB	SJB	
Suranga Rathnayaka	ANU	24,348	21 November 2024		SJB	SJB	
T. B. Sarath	POL	105,137	21 November 2024		NPP	NPP	Deputy Minister of Housing (21 November 2024 – 10 October 2025); Deputy Minister of Housing, Construction and Water Supply (since 10 October 2025)
Jagath Wickremerathna	POL	51,391	21 November 2024		NPP	NPP	Speaker of the Parliament (since 17 December 2024)
Sunil Rathnasiri	POL	51,077	21 November 2024		NPP	NPP	
Pathmasiri Bandara	POL	45,096	21 November 2024		NPP	NPP	
Kins Nelson	POL	28,682	21 November 2024		SJB	SJB	
Samantha Vidyaratna	BAD	208,247	21 November 2024		NPP	NPP	Minister of Plantation and Community Infrastructure
Kitnan Selvaraj	BAD	60,041	21 November 2024		NPP	NPP	
Ambika Samuel	BAD	58,201	21 November 2024		NPP	NPP	
Raveendra Bandara	BAD	50,822	21 November 2024		NPP	NPP	
Sudath Balagalla	BAD	47,980	21 November 2024		NPP	NPP	
Dinindu Hennayake	BAD	45,902	21 November 2024		NPP	NPP	Deputy Minister of Youth Affairs (since 10 October 2025)
Nayana Wasalathilake	BAD	35,518	21 November 2024		SJB	SJB	
Chaminda Wijesiri	BAD	29,791	21 November 2024		SJB	SJB	
Chamara Sampath Dassanayake	BAD	19,359	21 November 2024		NDF	NDF	
R. M. Jayawardena	MON	105,107	21 November 2024		NPP	NPP	Deputy Minister of Trade, Commerce and Food Security
Ajith Priyadarshana	MON	54,044	21 November 2024		NPP	NPP	
Chathuri Gangani	MON	42,930	21 November 2024		NPP	NPP	
Ruwan Wijeweera	MON	40,505	21 November 2024		NPP	NPP	
Sarath Kumara	MON	39,657	21 November 2024		NPP	NPP	
H. M. Dharmasena	MON	20,171	21 November 2024		SJB	SJB	
Shantha Padmakumara	RAT	137,965	21 November 2024		NPP	NPP	
S. Pradeep	RAT	112,711	21 November 2024		NPP	NPP	Deputy Minister of Plantation and Community Infrastructure
Hiniduma Sunil Senevi	RAT	76,505	21 November 2024		NPP	NPP	Minister of Buddha Sasana, Religious and Cultural Affairs
Janaka Senarathna	RAT	74,068	21 November 2024		NPP	NPP	
Sunil Rajapaksha	RAT	58,138	21 November 2024		NPP	NPP	
Upul Kithsiri	RAT	55,726	21 November 2024		NPP	NPP	
Wasantha Pushpakumara	RAT	52,841	21 November 2024		NPP	NPP	
Nilusha Gamage	RAT	48,791	21 November 2024		NPP	NPP	
Hesha Withanage	RAT	54,850	21 November 2024		SJB	SJB	
Waruna Priyantha Liyanage	RAT	44,705	21 November 2024		SJB	SJB	
Basooriyage Ariyawansa	RAT	26,760	21 November 2024		SJB	SJB	
Dammika Patabendi	KEG	186,409	21 November 2024		NPP	NPP	Minister of Environment
Kosala Jayaweera	KEG	61,713	21 November 2024	6 April 2025	NPP	NPP	Died. Replaced by Samantha Ranasinghe
Sagarika Athauda	KEG	59,019	21 November 2024		NPP	NPP	
Manoj Rajapaksha	KEG	54,173	21 November 2024		NPP	NPP	
Nandana Millagala	KEG	49,635	21 November 2024		NPP	NPP	
Kanchana Welipitiya	KEG	45,723	21 November 2024		NPP	NPP	
Nanda Bandara	KEG	45,115	21 November 2024		NPP	NPP	
Samantha Ranasinghe	KEG		8 May 2025		NPP	NPP	Replaced Kosala Jayaweera. (Note: Name published in The Gazette Extraordinary on 8 April 2025. Sworn in on 8 May 2025.)
Kabir Hashim	KEG	36,034	21 November 2024		SJB	SJB	
Sujith Sanjaya Perera	KEG	26,164	21 November 2024		SJB	SJB	
Bimal Rathnayake	NAT	—N/a	21 November 2024		NPP	NPP	Leader of the House; Minister of Transport, Highways, Ports and Civil Aviation (18 November 2024 – 10 October 2025); Minister of Transport, Highways and Urban Development (since 10 October 2025)
Anura Karunathilake	NAT	—N/a	21 November 2024		NPP	NPP	Minister of Urban Development, Housing and Construction (18 November 2024 – 10 October 2025); Minister of Ports and Civil Aviation (since 10 October 2025); Minister of Energy (since 20 April 2026)
Upali Pannilage	NAT	—N/a	21 November 2024		NPP	NPP	Minister of Rural Development, Social Security and Community Empowerment
Eranga Weeraratne	NAT	—N/a	21 November 2024		NPP	NPP	Deputy Minister of Digital Economy
Aruna Jayasekara	NAT	—N/a	21 November 2024		NPP	NPP	Deputy Minister of Defence
Harshana Suriyapperuma	NAT	—N/a	21 November 2024	20 June 2025	NPP	NPP	Deputy Minister of Finance and Planning (21 November 2024 – 20 June 2025); Resigned. Replaced by Nishantha Jayaweera.
Janitha Kodithuwakku	NAT	—N/a	21 November 2024		NPP	NPP	Deputy Minister of Ports and Civil Aviation
Kumara Jayakody	NAT	—N/a	21 November 2024		NPP	NPP	Minister of Energy; (18 November 2024 – 17 April 2026)
Ramalingam Chandrasekar	NAT	—N/a	21 November 2024		NPP	NPP	Minister of Fisheries, Aquatic and Ocean Resources
Najith Indika	NAT	—N/a	21 November 2024		NPP	NPP	
Sugath Thilakaratne	NAT	—N/a	21 November 2024		NPP	NPP	Deputy Minister of Sports
Lakmali Hemachandra	NAT	—N/a	21 November 2024		NPP	NPP	
Sunil Kumara Gamage	NAT	—N/a	21 November 2024		NPP	NPP	Minister of Sports and Youth Affairs
Gamini Rathnayake	NAT	—N/a	21 November 2024		NPP	NPP	
Ruwan Ranasinghe	NAT	—N/a	21 November 2024		NPP	NPP	Deputy Minister of Tourism
Sugath de Silva	NAT	—N/a	21 November 2024		NPP	NPP	
Abubakar Adambawa	NAT	—N/a	21 November 2024		NPP	NPP	
Upali Samarasinghe	NAT	—N/a	21 November 2024		NPP	NPP	Deputy Minister of Cooperative Development
Nishantha Jayaweera	NAT	—N/a	9 July 2025		NPP	NPP	Replaced Harshana Suriyapperuma. (Note: Name published in The Gazette Extraordinary on 7 July 2025. Sworn in on 9 July 2025.); Deputy Minister of Economic Development (since 10 October 2025)
Ranjith Madduma Bandara	NAT	—N/a	21 November 2024		SJB	SJB	
Sujeewa Senasinghe	NAT	—N/a	17 December 2024		SJB	SJB	(Note: Name published in The Gazette Extraordinary on 12 December 2024. Sworn in on 17 December 2024.)
Nizam Kariapper	NAT	—N/a	17 December 2024		SJB	SJB	
Muhammedu Ismail	NAT	—N/a	17 December 2024	28 November 2025	SJB	SJB	Resigned. Replaced by Marrikkar Mohamed Thahir.
Mano Ganeshan	NAT	—N/a	17 December 2024		SJB	SJB	
Marrikkar Mohamed Thahir	NAT	—N/a	5 December 2025		SJB	SJB	Replaced Muhammedu Ismail. (Note: Name published in The Gazette Extraordinary on 2 December 2025. Sworn in on 5 December 2025.)
Ravi Karunanayake	NAT	—N/a	21 November 2024		NDF	NDF	
Faiszer Musthapha	NAT	—N/a	17 December 2024		NDF	NDF	(Note: Name published in The Gazette Extraordinary on 11 December 2024. Sworn in on 17 December 2024.)
Namal Rajapaksa	NAT	—N/a	21 November 2024		SLPP	SLPP	
P. Sathiyalingam	NAT	—N/a	21 November 2024		ITAK	ITAK	
Dilith Jayaweera	NAT	—N/a	21 November 2024		SB	SB	
M. S. Naleem	NAT	—N/a	3 December 2024	14 March 2025	SLMC	SLMC	Resigned. (Note: Name published in The Gazette Extraordinary on 22 November 2024. Sworn in on 3 December 2024.) Replaced by Abdul Wazeeth.
Abdul Wazeeth	NAT	—N/a	8 July 2025	14 September 2026	SLMC	SLMC	Replaced M. S. Naleem. (Note: Name published in The Gazette Extraordinary on 3 July 2025. Sworn in on 8 July 2025.); Resigned. Replaced by Habeeb Rifan.
Habeeb Rifan	NAT	—N/a	24 September 2026		SLMC	SLMC	Replaced Abdul Wazeeth.
