= Chief Opposition Whip (Sri Lanka) =

Position in Sri Lanka Parliament

Chief Opposition Whip of Sri Lanka
- ප්‍රධාන විපක්ෂ සංවිධායක

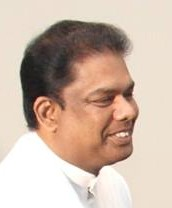
- Incumbent; Gayantha Karunathilaka since 2 December 2024
- Appointer: Leader of the Opposition
- Inaugural holder: J. R. Jayewardene
- Formation: 1960

The Chief Opposition Whip is a position in the Parliament of Sri Lanka. The position was first established in 1960.

== List of Chief Opposition Whips ==
Parties

United National Party Sri Lanka Freedom Party Tamil United Liberation Front Janatha Vimukthi Peramuna Samagi Jana Balawegaya

Name	Portrait	Tenure	Political party	Parliament	References
Parliament of Ceylon (1960–1972)
J. R. Jayewardene		1960 – 1965	United National Party	5th	
M. P. de Z. Siriwardena		1965 – 1970	Sri Lanka Freedom Party	6th	
Ranasinghe Premadasa		1970 – 1972	United National Party	7th	
National State Assembly (1972–1978)
Ranasinghe Premadasa		1972 – 1977	United National Party	1st	
X. M. Sellathambu		1977 – 1978	Tamil United Liberation Front	2nd	
Parliament of Sri Lanka (1978–present)
X. M. Sellathambu		1978 – 1983	Tamil United Liberation Front	8th	
Lakshman Jayakody		1983 – 1988	Sri Lanka Freedom Party	8th	
Richard Pathirana		1989 – 24 June 1994	Sri Lanka Freedom Party	9th	
Wijayapala Mendis		25 August 1994 – 21 July 1998	United National Party	10th	
W. J. M. Lokubandara		22 July 1998 – 10 October 2001	United National Party	10th 11th	
Mahinda Rajapaksa		18 December 2001 – 5 February 2002	Sri Lanka Freedom Party	12th	
Mangala Samaraweera		6 February 2002 – 7 February 2004	Sri Lanka Freedom Party	12th	
Mahinda Samarasinghe		22 April 2004 – 26 January 2006	United National Party	13th	
Joseph Michael Perera		26 January 2006 – 20 April 2010	United National Party	13th	
John Amaratunga		22 April 2010 – 20 January 2015	United National Party	14th	
John Senewiratne		20 January 2015 – 26 June 2015	Sri Lanka Freedom Party	14th	
Anura Kumara Dissanayake		3 September 2015 – 18 December 2018	Janatha Vimukthi Peramuna	15th	
Mahinda Amaraweera		18 December 2018 – 21 November 2019	Sri Lanka Freedom Party	15th	
Gayantha Karunatileka		3 January 2020 – 2 March 2020	United National Party	15th	
Lakshman Kiriella		20 August 2020 – 24 September 2024	Samagi Jana Balawegaya	16th	
Gayantha Karunathilaka		2 December 2024 – present	Samagi Jana Balawegaya	17th	
