= Chief Government Whip (Sri Lanka) =

Parliamentary position in Sri Lanka

Chief Government Whip of Sri Lanka
- Emblem of Sri Lanka

- Flag of Sri Lanka
- Incumbent; Nalinda Jayatissa since 21 November 2024
- Inaugural holder: R. S. S. Gunawardena
- Formation: 29 November 1947

The Chief Government Whip is a position in the Parliament of Sri Lanka.

== List of Chief Government Whips ==
Parties

United National Party Ceylon Labour Party Sri Lanka Freedom Party Mahajana Eksath Peramuna Sri Lanka Podujana Peramuna National People's Power

Name	Portrait	Political party	Tenure	Parliament	References
Parliament of Ceylon (1947–1972)
R. S. S. Gunawardena		United National Party	29 November 1947 – May 1948	1st	
A. E. Goonesinghe		Ceylon Labour Party	17 May 1948 – April 1952	1st	
C. W. W. Kannangara		United National Party	June 1952 – February 1956	2nd	
W. J. C. Moonesinghe		Sri Lanka Freedom Party	April 1956 – December 1959	3rd	
J. D. Weerasekera		Sri Lanka Freedom Party	July 1960 – 25 September 1963	5th	
S. K. K. Suriarachchi		Sri Lanka Freedom Party	1963–1964	5th	
M. P. de Z. Siriwardena		Sri Lanka Freedom Party	July 1964	5th	
J. R. Jayewardene		United National Party	1965–1970	6th	
K. B. Ratnayake		Sri Lanka Freedom Party	1970–1972	7th	
National State Assembly (1972–1978)
K. B. Ratnayake		Sri Lanka Freedom Party	1972–1977	1st	
Vincent Perera		United National Party	1977–1978	2nd	
Parliament of Sri Lanka (1978–present)
Vincent Perera		United National Party	7 September 1978 – 7 April 1993	8th 9th	
Wimal Wickramasinghe		United National Party	7 April 1993 – 24 June 1994	9th	
Richard Pathirana		Sri Lanka Freedom Party	25 August 1994 – 10 October 2000	10th	
Reggie Ranatunga		Sri Lanka Freedom Party	1 November 2000 – 10 October 2001	11th	
Mahinda Samarasinghe		United National Party	3 January 2002 – 7 February 2004	12th	
Jeyaraj Fernandopulle		Sri Lanka Freedom Party	3 May 2004 – 6 April 2008	13th	
Dinesh Gunawardena		Mahajana Eksath Peramuna	17 June 2008 – 20 January 2015	13th 14th	
Gayantha Karunathilaka		United National Party	20 January 2015 – 02 January 2020	14th 15th	
Johnston Fernando		Sri Lanka Podujana Peramuna	03 January 2020 – 18 April 2022	15th 16th	
Prasanna Ranatunga		Sri Lanka Podujana Peramuna	18 April 2022 – 24 September 2024	16th	
Nalinda Jayatissa		National People's Power	21 November 2024 – present	17th	
