= Leader of the House (Sri Lanka) =

Position in the Parliament of Sri Lanka

Leader of the House of Sri Lanka
- Incumbent; Bimal Rathnayake since 21 November 2024
- Inaugural holder: Don Baron Jayatilaka
- Formation: 10 July 1931

The Leader of the House is a position in the Parliament of Sri Lanka and is generally a member of the Cabinet of Sri Lanka who is responsible for arranging government business in the Parliament.

== List of Leaders of the House ==
Parties

Ceylon National Congress United National Party Sri Lanka Freedom Party Mahajana Eksath Peramuna Sri Lanka Podujana Peramuna National People's Power

Name	Portrait	Tenure	Political party	State Council	References
State Council of Ceylon (1931–1947)
Don Baron Jayatilaka		10 July 1931 – 30 November 1942	Ceylon National Congress	1st	
D. S. Senanayake		2 December 1942 – 4 July 1947	United National Party	2nd	
Parliament of Ceylon (1947–1972)
Name	Portrait	Tenure	Political party	Parliament	References
S. W. R. D. Bandaranaike		26 September 1947 – 12 July 1951	United National Party	1st	
John Kotelawala		12 July 1951 – 12 October 1953	United National Party	1st 2nd	
J. R. Jayewardene		29 October 1953 – 18 February 1956	United National Party	2nd	
C. P. de Silva		19 April 1956 – 5 December 1959	Sri Lanka Freedom Party	3rd	
J. R. Jayewardene		30 March 1960 – 23 April 1960	United National Party	4th	
C. P. de Silva		5 August 1960 – 17 December 1964	Sri Lanka Freedom Party	5th	
C. P. de Silva		5 April 1965 – 25 March 1970	United National Party	6th	
Maithripala Senanayake		7 June 1970 – 22 May 1972	Sri Lanka Freedom Party	7th	
National State Assembly (1972–1978)
Name	Portrait	Tenure	Political party	Assembly	References
Maithripala Senanayake		22 May 1972 – 18 May 1977	Sri Lanka Freedom Party	1st	
Ranasinghe Premadasa		26 July 1977 – 7 September 1978	United National Party	2nd	
Parliament of Sri Lanka (1978-present)
Name	Portrait	Tenure	Political party	Parliament	References
Ranasinghe Premadasa		7 September 1978 – 20 December 1988	United National Party	8th	
Ranil Wickremesinghe		6 March 1989 – 7 May 1993	United National Party	9th	
Wijayapala Mendis		7 May 1993 – 24 June 1994	United National Party	9th	
Ratnasiri Wickremanayake		25 August 1994 – 10 October 2000	Sri Lanka Freedom Party	10th	
Richard Pathirana		18 October 2000 – 10 October 2001	Sri Lanka Freedom Party	11th	
W. J. M. Lokubandara		3 January 2002 – 7 February 2004	United National Party	12th	
Maithripala Sirisena		3 May 2004 – 9 August 2005	Sri Lanka Freedom Party	13th	
Nimal Siripala de Silva		9 August 2005 – 20 January 2015	Sri Lanka Freedom Party	13th 14th	
Lakshman Kiriella		20 January 2015 – 2 January 2020	United National Party	14th 15th	
Dinesh Gunawardena		3 January 2020 – 27 July 2022	Mahajana Eksath Peramuna	15th 16th	
Susil Premajayantha		27 July 2022 – 24 September 2024	Sri Lanka Podujana Peramuna	16th	
Bimal Rathnayake		21 November 2024 – present	National People's Power	17th	
