= Prasad Siriwardana =

Sri Lankan politician

Hon. Amila Prasad Siriwardana MP
- අමිල ප්‍රසාද් සිරිවර්ධන அமிலா பிரசாத் சிரிவவர்தனா

Member of Parliament for Gampaha District
- Incumbent
- Assumed office 21 November 2024
- Majority: 23,699 Preferential votes

Personal details
- Born: 29 June 1983 (age 43)
- Party: Samagi Jana Balawegaya
- Education: University of Kelaniya
- Occupation: Physics Lecturer
- Website: prasadsiriwardana.com

Warnakulasooriya Madduma Muthukalage Amila Prasad Siriwardana (born 29 June 1983) is a Sri Lankan politician, social activist, and member of parliament. He was elected to the Parliament of Sri Lanka in 2024, representing the Gampaha Electoral District as a member of the Samagi Jana Balawegaya.

Siriwardana is a strong advocate for free-market economics and transitioning to an open economy system in Sri Lanka.

== Early life and education ==
Amila Prasad Siriwardana was born and raised in the Gampaha District of Sri Lanka. He completed his secondary education at Bandaranayake Central College, Veyangoda and pursued higher education at the University of Kelaniya. He graduated with a Bachelor of Science (BSc) degree.

Prior to entering politics, Siriwardana worked on grassroots projects aimed at improving educational opportunities for underprivileged children in the Gampaha District.

== Political career ==
Siriwardana entered politics as a member of the Samagi Jana Balawegaya (SJB), a center-right political party in Sri Lanka. In the 2024 parliamentary election, he contested from the Gampaha Electoral District and was successfully elected to the 17th Parliament of Sri Lanka. He secured his seat by obtaining 23,699 preferential votes.

== Personal life ==
Siriwardana currently resides in Mirigama.
