= Samantha Ranasinghe =

Sri Lankan politician

Hon. Samantha Ranasinghe MP
- සමන්ත රණසිංහ சமந்தா ரணசிங்க

Member of Parliament for Kegalle District
- Incumbent
- Assumed office 8 May 2025
- Preceded by: Kosala Jayaweera

Personal details
- Born: Ratnayake Mudiyanselage Samantha Ranasinghe
- Party: National People's Power

Ratnayake Mudiyanselage Samantha Ranasinghe is a Sri Lankan politician. He contested the 2024 Sri Lankan parliamentary election and was elected to the 17th Parliament of Sri Lanka from the Kegalle Electoral District as a member of the National People's Power, replacing Kosala Jayaweera, who died on 6 April 2025.

His appointment was confirmed by the Election Commission of Sri Lanka on 8 April 2025 and was sworn in on 8 May 2025.
