= Muhammedu Ismail =

Sri Lankan politician

Hon. Muhammedu Ismail Muththu Muhammedu MP
- මුහම්මදු ඉස්මයිල් මුත්තු මුහම්මදු முஹம்மது இஸ்மாயில் முத்து முகமது

Member of Parliament for National List
- In office 17 November 2024 – 28 November 2025
- Succeeded by: Marrikkar Mohamed Thahir

Personal details
- Party: All Ceylon Makkal Congress; Samagi Jana Balawegaya

Muhammedu Ismail Muththu Muhammedu is a Sri Lankan politician. He was nominated as a Member of Parliament from the National list on 12 December and was sworn in on 17 December 2024. He represents the All Ceylon Makkal Congress (ACMC), which contested in alliance with the Samagi Jana Balawegaya (SJB).

He resigned from his parliamentary seat on 28 November 2025 and was replaced by Marrikkar Mohamed Thahir on 5 December.
