= Kosala Jayaweera =

Sri Lankan politician (1987–2025)

Hon. Kosala Nuwan Jayaweera MP
- කෝසල නුවන් ජයවීර கோசல நுவான் ஜெயவீர

Member of Parliament for Kegalle District
- In office 21 November 2024 – 6 April 2025
- Majority: 61,713

Personal details
- Born: Kosala Nuwan Jayaweera; 14 January 1987
- Died: 6 April 2025 (aged 38)
- Party: National People's Power

Kosala Nuwan Jayaweera (14 January 1987 – 6 April 2025) was a Sri Lankan politician. He was elected to the 17th Sri Lankan Parliament from Kegalle Electoral District as a member of the National People's Power.

Jayaweera died on 6 April 2025, at the age of 38. His vacant parliamentary seat was filled by Samantha Ranasinghe.
