= Marrikkar Mohamed Thahir =

Sri Lankan politician

Hon. Marrikkar Mohamed Thahir MP
- මරික්කාර් මොහොමඩ් තාහීර් மரிக்கார் முகமது தாஹிர்

Member of Parliament for National List
- Incumbent
- Assumed office 5 December 2025
- Preceded by: Muhammedu Ismail

Personal details
- Born: Naina Thambi Marrikkar Mohamed Thahir
- Party: Samagi Jana Balawegaya

Naina Thambi Marrikkar Mohamed Thahir is a Sri Lankan politician. He was nominated as a Member of Parliament from the National list on 2 December 2025 by the Samagi Jana Balawegaya and was sworn in on 5 December.

He replaced Muhammedu Ismail who had earlier resigned from his parliamentary seat on 28 November.
