= 12th Parliament of Sri Lanka =

2001–2004 meeting of the Sri Lankan legislature

←	11th	13th	→

Overview
- Legislative body: Parliament of Sri Lanka
- Term: 19 December 2001 – 7 February 2004
- Election: 5 December 2001

Senior parliamentarians
- Speaker: M. Joseph Michael Perera, UNF
- Deputy Speaker and Chairman of Committees: Vacant
- Deputy Chairman of Committees: Siri Andrahennady, UNF
- Prime Minister: Ranil Wickremesinghe, UNF
- Leader of the Opposition: Ratnasiri Wickremanayake, PA (2001–02); Mahinda Rajapaksa, PA (2002–04)
- Leader of the House: W. J. M. Lokubandara, UNF
- Chief Government Whip: Mahinda Samarasinghe, UNF
- Chief Opposition Whip: Mahinda Rajapaksa, PA (2001–02); Mangala Samaraweera, PA (2002–04)

Sessions
- 1st: 19 December 2001 – 3 November 2003
- 2nd: 19 November 2003 – 7 February 2004

The 12th Parliament of Sri Lanka, known officially as the 5th Parliament of the Democratic Socialist Republic of Sri Lanka, was a meeting of the Parliament of Sri Lanka, with the membership determined by the results of the 2001 parliamentary election held on 5 December 2001. The parliament met for the first time on 19 December 2001 and was dissolved prematurely on 7 February 2004.

== Election ==
The 12th parliamentary election was held on 5 December 2001. The United National Front (UNF), a newly formed opposition alliance, became the largest group in Parliament by winning 109 of the 225 seats. The incumbent People's Alliance (PA) won 77 seats. The Janatha Vimukthi Peramuna (JVP) won 16 seats and the Tamil National Alliance (TNA), a newly formed alliance of Tamil parties, won 15 seats. Smaller parties won the remaining 8 seats.

=== Results ===
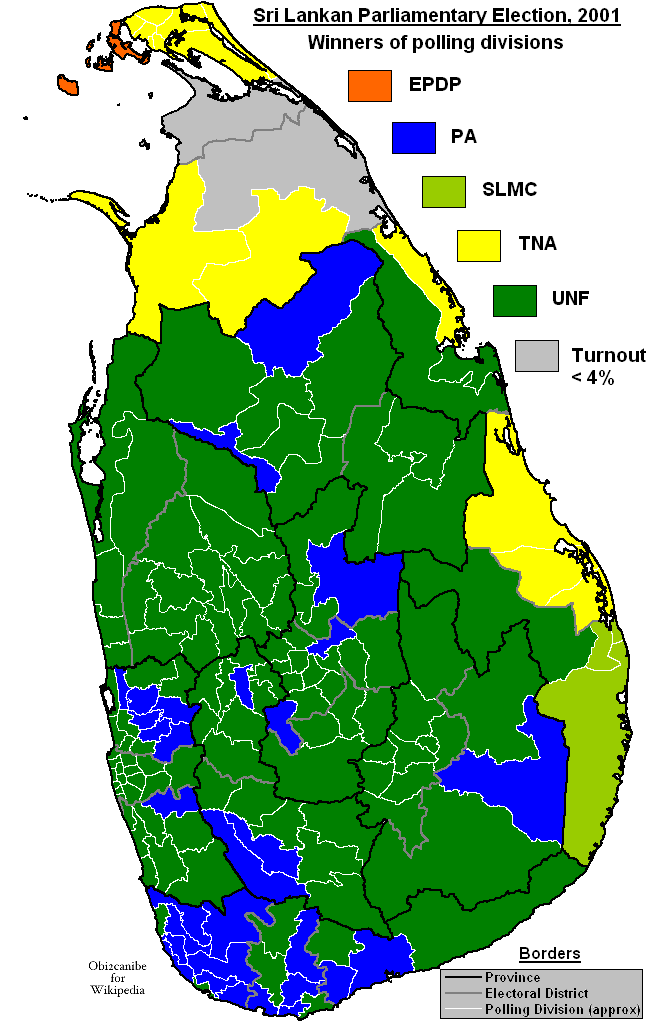
Winners of polling divisions. UNF in green and PA in blue.

Alliance	Votes	%	Seats
United National Front	4,086,026	45.62%	109
People's Alliance	3,330,815	37.19%	77
Janatha Vimukthi Peramuna	815,353	9.10%	16
Tamil National Alliance	348,164	3.89%	15
Sri Lanka Muslim Congress	105,346	1.18%	5
Eelam People's Democratic Party	72,783	0.81%	2
Democratic People's Liberation Front	16,669	0.19%	1
Others	180,713	2.02%	0
Total	8,955,869	100.00%	225

The new parliament was sworn in on 19 December 2001. M. Joseph Michael Perera was elected as the Speaker unopposed. The post of Deputy Speaker was left vacant after the PA refused to nominate anyone. Siri Andrahennady was elected Deputy Chairman of Committees unopposed.

== Government ==
The UNF was able to form a government with the support of the five SLMC MPs elected under their party's name (the SLMC contested under its name in three districts and with the UNF in all other districts).

On 9 December 2001, President Chandrika Kumaratunga appointed Ranil Wickremesinghe, the leader of the UNF, as the new Prime Minister. The rest of the government, consisting of 24 ministers, 28 project ministers and 8 deputy ministers, was sworn in on 12 December 2001.

The 12th parliament saw the only significant period of co-habitation between two major political parties in Sri Lanka (the SLFP and the UNP) since the introduction of the executive presidency in 1978. Throughout this period, there were numerous disputes between President Kumaratunga and Prime Minister Wickremesinghe, particularly over the handling of the peace process with the rebel Liberation Tigers of Tamil Eelam. The political tension came to a head in early November 2003 when, as Prime Minister Wickremesinghe was out of the country, President Kumaratunga prorogued parliament, declared a state of emergency, sent troops into the streets of the capital and took control of three important ministries (defence, interior and media). On 20 January 2004, the Sri Lanka Freedom Party, President Kumaratunga's party and the main constituent of the opposition People's Alliance, and the Janatha Vimukthi Peramuna formed a new political alliance called the United People's Freedom Alliance (UPFA). A few days later on 7 February 2004, Kumaratunga dissolved parliament, nearly four years ahead of schedule and in spite of the government having the support of the majority of parliament.

== Members ==
=== Deaths and resignations ===
The 12th parliament saw the following deaths and resignations:

- 5 June 2002 − Murugesu Sivasithamparam (TNA/NAT) died. Replaced by Kathirgamathamby Thurairetnasingam (TNA/NAT).

=== List ===
Name	Electoral District	Preference Votes	Member From	Member To	Elected Party	Elected Alliance	Final Party	Final Alliance	Notes
Abayakoon, Dimuthu Bandara	KAN	5,957	19 December 2001	7 February 2004	JVP		JVP		
Abeygunawardena, Rohitha	KAL	46,571	19 December 2001	7 February 2004	SLFP	PA	SLFP	PA	
Abeynayake, Piyadasa	RAT	38,655	19 December 2001	7 February 2004	UNP	UNF	UNP	UNF	
Abeyratne, P. D.	KAL	52,414	19 December 2001	7 February 2004	UNP	UNF	UNP	UNF	
Abeywardena, Lakshman Yapa	MTR	81,617	19 December 2001	7 February 2004	UNP	UNF	UNP	UNF	
Abeywardena, Mahinda Yapa	MTR	64,756	19 December 2001	7 February 2004	SLFP	PA	SLFP	PA	
Abeywardena, Vajira	GAL	110,055	19 December 2001	7 February 2004	UNP	UNF	UNP	UNF	Project Minister of Public Administration, Management & Reforms (01-).
Abeywickrama, Ananda	GAL	50,772	19 December 2001	7 February 2004	UNP	UNF	UNP	UNF	
Adaikalanathan, Selvam	VAN	28,548	19 December 2001	7 February 2004	TELO	TNA	TELO	TNA	
Aluthgamage, Mahindananda	KAN	50,618	19 December 2001	7 February 2004	SLFP	PA	SLFP	PA	
Aluvihare, Alick	MTL	75,620	19 December 2001	7 February 2004	UNP	UNF	UNP	UNF	Minister of Home Affairs, Provincial Councils & Local Government (01-).
Aluvihare, Ranjith	MTL	72,553	19 December 2001	7 February 2004	UNP	UNF	UNP	UNF	
Amaratunga, John	GAM	82,326	19 December 2001	7 February 2004	UNP	UNF	UNP	UNF	Minister of Interior (01–03).
Amaraweera, Mahinda	NAT		19 December 2001	7 February 2004	SLFP	PA	SLFP	PA	
Amunugama, Sarath	KAN	78,110	19 December 2001	7 February 2004	SLFP	PA	SLFP	PA	
Anandasangaree, Veerasingham	JAF	36,217	19 December 2001	7 February 2004	TULF	TNA	TULF	TNA	
Ananthan, Sivasakthy	VAN	14,023	19 December 2001	7 February 2004	EPRLF	TNA	EPRLF	TNA	
Andrahennady, Siri	HAM	26,644	19 December 2001	7 February 2004	UNP	UNF	UNP	UNF	Deputy Chairman of Committees (01–04).
Ashraff, Ferial	AMP	28,802	19 December 2001	7 February 2004	NUA	PA	NUA	PA	
Athaullah. A. L. M.	AMP	35,523	19 December 2001	7 February 2004	SLMC		SLMC	UNF	Project Minister of Highways (01-).
Athukorala, Gamini	RAT	140,054	19 December 2001	7 February 2004	UNP	UNF	UNP	UNF	Minister of Transport, Highways & Aviation (01-).
Attanayake, Tissa	KAN	99,381	19 December 2001	7 February 2004	UNP	UNF	UNP	UNF	Minister of Central Region Development (01-).
Azwer, A. H. M.	NAT		19 December 2001	7 February 2004	UNP	UNF	UNP	UNF	Project Minister of Parliamentary Affairs (01-).
Bathiudeen, Rishad	VAN	9,276	19 December 2001	7 February 2004	SLMC	UNF	SLMC	UNF	
Bandara, Palitha Range	PUT	69,167	19 December 2001	7 February 2004	UNP	UNF	UNP	UNF	
Bandara, R. M. Ranjith Madduma	MON	38,474	19 December 2001	7 February 2004	UNP	UNF	UNP	UNF	
Bandara, S. A. R. Madduma	BAD	36,708	19 December 2001	7 February 2004	SLFP	PA	SLFP	PA	
Bandaranaike, Anura	GAM	262,051	19 December 2001	7 February 2004	SLFP	PA	SLFP	PA	
Bandaranaike, D. M.	KUR	52,808	19 December 2001	7 February 2004	UNP	UNF	UNP	UNF	
Bandaranaike, Indika	KUR	69,513	19 December 2001	7 February 2004	UNP	UNF	UNP	UNF	Deputy Minister of Environment & Natural Resources (01-).
Bandaranaike, Pandu	GAM	78,614	19 December 2001	7 February 2004	SLFP	PA	SLFP	PA	
Bawa, A. A. M.	NAT		19 December 2001	7 February 2004	SLMC		SLMC	UNF	
Bogollagama, Rohitha	KUR	65,576	19 December 2001	7 February 2004	UNP	UNF	UNP	UNF	Project Minister of Industries (01-).
Cader, A. R. M. Abdul	NAT		19 December 2001	7 February 2004	UNP	UNF	UNP	UNF	Minister of Co-operatives (01-).
Cader, Mohideen Abdul	BAT	17,497	19 December 2001	7 February 2004	SLMC		SLMC	UNF	Deputy Minister of Fisheries (01-).
Chandranehru, A.	AMP	26,282	19 December 2001	7 February 2004	TULF	TNA	TULF	TNA	
Chandrasekar, Ramalingam	NAT		19 December 2001	7 February 2004	JVP		JVP		
Chandrasekaran, Periyasamy	NUW	121,421	19 December 2001	7 February 2004	UCPF	UNF	UCPF	UNF	Project Minister of Estate Infrastructure (01-).
Chandrasena, S. M.	ANU	38,090	19 December 2001	7 February 2004	SLFP	PA	SLFP	PA	
Choksy, K. N.	NAT		19 December 2001	7 February 2004	UNP	UNF	UNP	UNF	Minister of Finance (01-).
Collure, Raja	NAT		19 December 2001	7 February 2004	CPSL	PA	CPSL	PA	
Dassanayake, D. M.	PUT	47,100	19 December 2001	7 February 2004	SLFP	PA	SLFP	PA	
Dassanayake, D. M. S. K.	NUW	35,504	19 December 2001	7 February 2004	SLFP	PA	SLFP	PA	
Dawood, Basheer Segu	NAT		19 December 2001	7 February 2004	SLMC	UNF	SLMC	UNF	Deputy Minister of Housing (01-).
Dayaratna, Petikirige	AMP	42,301	19 December 2001	7 February 2004	UNP	UNF	UNP	UNF	Minister of Health, Nutrition & Welfare (01-).
Dayaratne, Tudor	KAL	55,181	19 December 2001	7 February 2004	SLFP	PA	SLFP	PA	
de Mel, Mallika	MTR	60,531	19 December 2001	7 February 2004	SLFP	PA	SLFP	PA	
de Mel, Ronnie	NAT		19 December 2001	7 February 2004	SLFP	PA	SLFP	PA	
de Silva, Nimal Siripala	BAD	85,273	19 December 2001	7 February 2004	SLFP	PA	SLFP	PA	
de Soyza, Ajantha	NAT		19 December 2001	7 February 2004	SLFP	PA	SLFP	PA	
Devananda, Douglas	JAF	9,744	19 December 2001	7 February 2004	EPDP		EPDP		
Dissanayake, Anura Kumara	NAT		19 December 2001	7 February 2004	JVP		JVP		
Dissanayake, Duminda	ANU	76,088	19 December 2001	7 February 2004	SLFP	PA	SLFP	PA	
Dissanayake, Navin	NUW	74,894	19 December 2001	7 February 2004	UNP	UNF	UNP	UNF	Deputy Minister of Plantations Industries (01-).
Dissanayake, S. B.	NAT		19 December 2001	7 February 2004	UNP	UNF	UNP	UNF	Minister of Agriculture & Livestock (01-). Minister of Samurdhi (01-).
Dissanayake, Salinda	KUR	69,963	19 December 2001	7 February 2004	SLFP	PA	SLFP	PA	
Dodangoda, Amarasiri	GAL	78,697	19 December 2001	7 February 2004	SLFP	PA	SLFP	PA	
Ekanayake, T. B.	KUR	43,994	19 December 2001	7 February 2004	SLFP	PA	SLFP	PA	
Ekanayake, W. B.	ANU	51,373	19 December 2001	7 February 2004	UNP	UNF	UNP	UNF	
Fernando, Johnston	KUR	114,845	19 December 2001	7 February 2004	UNP	UNF	UNP	UNF	Project Minister of Youth Affairs & Sports (01-).
Fernando, Milroy	PUT	35,121	19 December 2001	7 February 2004	SLFP	PA	SLFP	PA	
Fernando, Tyronne	COL	46,129	19 December 2001	7 February 2004	UNP	UNF	UNP	UNF	Minister of Foreign Affairs (01-).
Fernandopulle, Jeyaraj	GAM	95,591	19 December 2001	7 February 2004	SLFP	PA	SLFP	PA	
Fowzie, A. H. M.	COL	103,817	19 December 2001	7 February 2004	SLFP	PA	SLFP	PA	
Galappaththi, Justin	MTR	60,548	19 December 2001	7 February 2004	UNP	UNF	UNP	UNF	
Galappaththi, Nihal	HAM	4,514	19 December 2001	7 February 2004	JVP		JVP		
Gamage, Lal	ANU	36,609	19 December 2001	7 February 2004	UNP	UNF	UNP	UNF	Project Minister of Assisting Foreign Affairs (01-).
Gamage, Piyasena	GAL	54,570	19 December 2001	7 February 2004	SLFP	PA	SLFP	PA	
Ganesan, Mano	COL	54,942	19 December 2001	7 February 2004	WPF	UNF	WPF	UNF	
Gopallawa, Anura	KUR	48,672	19 December 2001	7 February 2004	UNP	UNF	UNP	UNF	
Gunasekara, Earl	POL	57,957	19 December 2001	7 February 2004	UNP	UNF	UNP	UNF	Project Minister of Home Affairs, Local Government & Provincial Councils (01-).
Gunaserkara, Edward	GAM	70,667	19 December 2001	7 February 2004	UNP	UNF	UNP	UNF	
Gunathilake, Nandana	KAL	8,312	19 December 2001	7 February 2004	JVP		JVP		
Gunawardena, Bandula	COL	66,516	19 December 2001	7 February 2004	UNP	UNF	UNP	UNF	Minister of Rural Economy (01-). Deputy Minister of Finance (01-).
Gunawardena, Dinesh	COL	87,615	19 December 2001	7 February 2004	MEP	PA	MEP	PA	
Gunawardena, M. K. A. S.	TRI	14,938	19 December 2001	7 February 2004	SLFP	PA	SLFP	PA	
Gunawardena, Sarana	GAM	59,470	19 December 2001	7 February 2004	SLFP	PA	SLFP	PA	
Hajrath, A. L. M.	NAT		19 December 2001	7 February 2004	SLMC	UNF	SLMC	UNF	
Hakeem, Rauff	KAN	71,094	19 December 2001	7 February 2004	SLMC	UNF	SLMC	UNF	Minister of Port Development & Shipping (01-). Minister of Eastern Development & Muslim Religious Affairs (01-).
Haleem, M. H. A.	KAN	75,630	19 December 2001	7 February 2004	UNP	UNF	UNP	UNF	
Handunnetti, Sunil	COL	9,438	19 December 2001	7 February 2004	JVP		JVP		
Harees, H. M. M.	AMP	34,798	19 December 2001	7 February 2004	SLMC		SLMC	UNF	
Harrison, Palisge	ANU	69,878	19 December 2001	7 February 2004	UNP	UNF	UNP	UNF	Project Minister of Housing Development (01-).
Hashim, Kabir	KEG	53,406	19 December 2001	7 February 2004	UNP	UNF	UNP	UNF	Project Minister of Tertiary Education & Training (01-).
Herath, Jayarathna	KUR	47,471	19 December 2001	7 February 2004	SLFP	PA	SLFP	PA	
Herath, Maheepala	KEG	70,934	19 December 2001	7 February 2004	SLFP	PA	SLFP	PA	
Herath, Vijitha	GAM	13,981	19 December 2001	7 February 2004	JVP		JVP		
Hisbullah, M. L. A. M.	BAT	19,785	19 December 2001	7 February 2004	SLFP	PA	SLFP	PA	
Isadean, M. H. Segu	NAT		19 December 2001	7 February 2004	NUA	PA	NUA	PA	
Ismail, Mohamed	AMP	23,718	19 December 2001	7 February 2004	SLMC		SLMC	UNF	
Jagodage, Achala	RAT	2,617	19 December 2001	7 February 2004	JVP		JVP		
Jayaratne, D. M.	NAT		19 December 2001	7 February 2004	SLFP	PA	SLFP	PA	
Jayaratne, Sydney	POL	28,109	19 December 2001	7 February 2004	UNP	UNF	UNP	UNF	
Jayasekara, Premalal	RAT	79,742	19 December 2001	7 February 2004	SLFP	PA	SLFP	PA	
Jayasena, Sumedha	MON	31,239	19 December 2001	7 February 2004	SLFP	PA	SLFP	PA	
Jayasinghe, Athula Nimalasiri	NAT		19 December 2001	7 February 2004	SLFP	PA	SLFP	PA	
Jayasinghe, Chandrani Bandara	ANU	54,969	19 December 2001	7 February 2004	UNP	UNF	UNP	UNF	
Jayasuriya, Karu	GAM	250,912	19 December 2001	7 February 2004	UNP	UNF	UNP	UNF	Minister of Power & Energy (01-).
Jayawardena, Asoka	RAT	37,442	19 December 2001	7 February 2004	SLFP	PA	SLFP	PA	
Jayawardena, Jayalath	GAM	116,737	19 December 2001	7 February 2004	UNP	UNF	UNP	UNF	Project Minister of Rehabilitation, Resettlement & Refugees (01-).
Jayawardena, Lucky	KAN	45,693	19 December 2001	7 February 2004	UNP	UNF	UNP	UNF	
Jayaweera, Jayantha	GAL	49,667	19 December 2001	7 February 2004	UNP	UNF	UNP	UNF	
Kadirgamar, Lakshman	NAT		19 December 2001	7 February 2004	SLFP	PA	SLFP	PA	
Karalliyadde, Tissa	ANU	35,608	19 December 2001	7 February 2004	SLFP	PA	SLFP	PA	
Karunanayake, Ravi	COL	129,993	19 December 2001	7 February 2004	UNP	UNF	UNP	UNF	Project Minister of Commerce & Consumer Affairs (01-).
Karunathilaka, Gayantha	GAL	64,257	19 December 2001	7 February 2004	UNP	UNF	UNP	UNF	
Kathriarachchi, Chandana	COL	57,673	19 December 2001	7 February 2004	SLFP	PA	SLFP	PA	
Katugoda, Jayantha	COL	54,274	19 December 2001	7 February 2004	UNP	UNF	UNP	UNF	
Kaviratne, Sanjeeva	MTL	37,226	19 December 2001	7 February 2004	UNP	UNF	UNP	UNF	
Kiriella, Lakshman	KAN	70,241	19 December 2001	7 February 2004	UNP	UNF	UNP	UNF	Minister of Plantation Industries (01-).
Kitulagoda, Jinadasa	MTR	4,799	19 December 2001	7 February 2004	JVP		JVP		
Kodituwakku, Karunasena	COL	78,093	19 December 2001	7 February 2004	UNP	UNF	UNP	UNF	Project Minister of Human Resource Development, Education & Cultural Affairs (01-)
Krishnappillai, Gnanamuththu	BAT	20,675	19 December 2001	7 February 2004	ACTC	TNA	ACTC	TNA	
Kuganeswaran, Irasa	VAN	15,936	19 December 2001	7 February 2004	TELO	TNA	TELO	TNA	
Kularathne, Ananda	HAM	24,811	19 December 2001	7 February 2004	UNP	UNF	UNP	UNF	Minister of Southern Regional Development (01-).
Kumara, Ananda Sarath	POL	40,381	19 December 2001	7 February 2004	SLFP	PA	SLFP	PA	
Kumaranatunga, Jeewan	COL	70,799	19 December 2001	7 February 2004	SLFP	PA	SLFP	PA	
Kumarasiri, Ananda	MON	37,567	19 December 2001	7 February 2004	UNP	UNF	UNP	UNF	
Lalkantha, K. D.	ANU	4,304	19 December 2001	7 February 2004	JVP		JVP		
Lokubandara, W. J. M.	BAD	80,593	19 December 2001	7 February 2004	UNP	UNF	UNP	UNF	Leader of the House (01–04). Minister of Justice, Law Reform & National Integration (01-). Minister of Buddha Sasana (01-).
Lokuge, Gamini	COL	66,968	19 December 2001	7 February 2004	UNP	UNF	UNP	UNF	Minister of Tourism (01-).
Maharoof, Mohamed	TRI	25,264	19 December 2001	7 February 2004	UNP	UNF	UNP	UNF	
Maheswaran, Thiagarasah	JAF	11,598	19 December 2001	7 February 2004	UNP	UNF	UNP	UNF	Project Minister of Hindu Affairs (01-).
Mahroof, Mohamed	COL	85,988	19 December 2001	7 February 2004	UNP	UNF	UNP	UNF	Project Minister of Urban Public Utilities (01-).
Makar, Imithiyas Bakeer	KAL	89,147	19 December 2001	7 February 2004	UNP	UNF	UNP	UNF	Project Minister of Mass Communication (01–03).
Manthilake, Chitra	KAN	51,768	19 December 2001	7 February 2004	UNP	UNF	UNP	UNF	
Marapana, Tilak	NAT		19 December 2001	7 February 2004	UNP	UNF	UNP	UNF	Minister of Defence (01–03).
Mashoor, Noordeen	VAN	12,673	19 December 2001	7 February 2004	UNP	UNF	UNP	UNF	Project Minister of Assisting Vanni Rehabilitation (01-).
Matanarasa, Nadarasa	JAF	7,350	19 December 2001	7 February 2004	EPDP		EPDP		
Mohamed, M. H.	COL	64,783	19 December 2001	7 February 2004	UNP	UNF	UNP	UNF	Minister of Western Region Development (01-).
Moragoda, Milinda	COL	134,132	19 December 2001	7 February 2004	UNP	UNF	UNP	UNF	Project Minister of Economic Reform, Science & Technology (01-).
Musthaffa, M. M. M.	NAT		19 December 2001	7 February 2004	UNP	UNF	UNP	UNF	
Nanayakkara, Hemakumara	GAL	78,590	19 December 2001	7 February 2004	UNP	UNF	UNP	UNF	
Nawinne, S. B.	KUR	78,718	19 December 2001	7 February 2004	SLFP	PA	SLFP	PA	
Nelson, H. G. P.	POL	41,822	19 December 2001	7 February 2004	UNP	UNF	UNP	UNF	Project Minister of Irrigation (01-).
Pararajasingham, Joseph	BAT	20,279	19 December 2001	7 February 2004	TULF	TNA	TULF	TNA	
Pathirana, Richard	GAL	72,737	19 December 2001	7 February 2004	SLFP	PA	SLFP	PA	
Peiris, G. L.	NAT		19 December 2001	7 February 2004	UNP	UNF	UNP	UNF	Minister of Enterprise Development, Industrial Policy & Investment Promotion (01-). Minister of Constitutional Affairs (01-).
Perera, Dilan	NAT		19 December 2001	7 February 2004	SLFP	PA	SLFP	PA	
Perera, Felix	GAM	73,009	19 December 2001	7 February 2004	SLFP	PA	SLFP	PA	
Perera, Gamini Jayawickrama	KUR	141,702	19 December 2001	7 February 2004	UNP	UNF	UNP	UNF	Minister of Irrigation & Water Management (01-).
Perera, Joseph Michael	GAM	86,959	19 December 2001	7 February 2004	UNP	UNF	UNP	UNF	Speaker (01–04).
Perera, Larine	PUT	46,043	19 December 2001	7 February 2004	UNP	UNF	UNP	UNF	
Perera, Lilantha	COL	43,887	19 December 2001	7 February 2004	UNP	UNF	UNP	UNF	
Perera, Neomal	PUT	59,895	19 December 2001	7 February 2004	UNP	UNF	UNP	UNF	
Piyadasa, K. K.	NUW	54,206	19 December 2001	7 February 2004	UNP	UNF	UNP	UNF	
Piyasena, Upali	KUR	50,963	19 December 2001	7 February 2004	UNP	UNF	UNP	UNF	Project Minister of State Transport (01-).
Podinilame, Jayathilaka	KEG	46,769	19 December 2001	7 February 2004	UNP	UNF	UNP	UNF	Project Minister of North West Regional Development (01-).
Ponnambalam, Gajendrakumar	JAF	29,641	19 December 2001	7 February 2004	ACTC	TNA	ACTC	TNA	
Premachandra, Bharatha Lazman	COL	61,530	19 December 2001	7 February 2004	SLFP	PA	SLFP	PA	
Premadasa, Champika	KEG	57,249	19 December 2001	7 February 2004	UNP	UNF	UNP	UNF	
Premadasa, Sajith	HAM	92,536	19 December 2001	7 February 2004	UNP	UNF	UNP	UNF	Deputy Minister of Health (01-).
Premajayanth, Susil	COL	90,170	19 December 2001	7 February 2004	SLFP	PA	SLFP	PA	
Premathirathna, Olitha	GAM	81,302	19 December 2001	7 February 2004	UNP	UNF	UNP	UNF	
Punchinilame, Susantha	RAT	101,033	19 December 2001	7 February 2004	UNP	UNF	UNP	UNF	Project Minister of Small Holder Development (01-).
Pushpakumara, Jagath	MON	32,754	19 December 2001	7 February 2004	SLFP	PA	SLFP	PA	
Puththirasigamoney, Vadivel	NAT		19 December 2001	7 February 2004	SLFP	PA	SLFP	PA	
Radhakrishnan, Perumalpillai	NAT		19 December 2001	7 February 2004	UCPF	UNF	UCPF	UNF	
Rajakaruna, Sarath Chandra	GAM	60,776	19 December 2001	7 February 2004	UNP	UNF	UNP	UNF	
Rajapaksa, Chamal	HAM	48,473	19 December 2001	7 February 2004	SLFP	PA	SLFP	PA	
Rajapaksa, Mahinda	HAM	81,855	19 December 2001	7 February 2004	SLFP	PA	SLFP	PA	^{Chief Opposition Whip (01–02). Leader of the Opposition (02–04).}
Rajapaksha, Suranimala	GAM	60,861	19 December 2001	7 February 2004	UNP	UNF	UNP	UNF	Project Minister of School Education (01-).
Rambukwella, Keheliya	KAN	143,235	19 December 2001	7 February 2004	UNP	UNF	UNP	UNF	
Ranatunga, Arjuna	COL	97,409	19 December 2001	7 February 2004	SLFP	PA	SLFP	PA	
Ranatunga, Reggie	GAM	53,031	19 December 2001	7 February 2004	SLFP	PA	SLFP	PA	
Randeniya, Ravindra	GAM	56,449	19 December 2001	7 February 2004	UNP	UNF	UNP	UNF	
Rathnayaka, Bimal	KUR	4,240	19 December 2001	7 February 2004	JVP		JVP		
Rathnayake, C. B.	NUW	49,673	19 December 2001	7 February 2004	SLFP	PA	SLFP	PA	
Rathnayake, Gamini	KEG	3,691	19 December 2001	7 February 2004	JVP		JVP		
Ratnatilaka, Mahinda	RAT	58,265	19 December 2001	7 February 2004	UNP	UNF	UNP	UNF	
Ratnayaka, Sagala	MTR	55,423	19 December 2001	7 February 2004	UNP	UNF	UNP	UNF	Deputy Minister of Power & Energy (01-).
Ratnayake, Amara Piyaseeli	KUR	50,963	19 December 2001	7 February 2004	UNP	UNF	UNP	UNF	Minister of Women's Affairs (01-).
Ratwatte, Anuruddha	KAN	102,906	19 December 2001	7 February 2004	SLFP	PA	SLFP	PA	
Raviraj, Nadarajah	JAF	19,263	19 December 2001	7 February 2004	TULF	TNA	TULF	TNA	
Rupasinghe, Neil	GAM	48,167	19 December 2001	7 February 2004	SLFP	PA	SLFP	PA	
Samarasinghe, Mahinda	KAL	108,503	19 December 2001	7 February 2004	UNP	UNF	UNP	UNF	Chief Government Whip (01–04). Project Minister of Employment & Labour (01-).
Samaraweera, Mangala	MTR	105,992	19 December 2001	7 February 2004	SLFP	PA	SLFP	PA	Chief Opposition Whip (02–04).
Samaraweera, Ravindra	BAD	44,742	19 December 2001	7 February 2004	UNP	UNF	UNP	UNF	Project Minister of Social Welfare (01-).
Samaraweera, Upali	BAD	43,228	19 December 2001	7 February 2004	UNP	UNF	UNP	UNF	
Samitha, Baddegama	GAL	42,120	19 December 2001	7 February 2004	SLFP	PA	SLFP	PA	
Sampanthan, Rajavarothiam	TRI	40,110	19 December 2001	7 February 2004	TULF	TNA	TULF	TNA	
Sathasivam, S.	NAT		19 December 2001	7 February 2004	SLFP	PA	SLFP	PA	
Senanayake, Rukman	KEG	73,594	19 December 2001	7 February 2004	UNP	UNF	UNP	UNF	Minister of Environment & Natural Resources (01-).
Senaratne, Rajitha	KAL	102,919	19 December 2001	7 February 2004	UNP	UNF	UNP	UNF	Project Minister of Land (01-).
Senathirajah, Mavai	JAF	33,831	19 December 2001	7 February 2004	TULF	TNA	TULF	TNA	
Senewiratne, Athauda	KEG	56,299	19 December 2001	7 February 2004	SLFP	PA	SLFP	PA	
Senewiratne, John	RAT	64,693	19 December 2001	7 February 2004	SLFP	PA	SLFP	PA	
Senewiratne, Lakshman	BAD	46,792	19 December 2001	7 February 2004	UNP	UNF	UNP	UNF	Project Minister of Water Management (01-).
Shivajilingam, M. K.	JAF	17,859	19 December 2001	7 February 2004	TELO	TNA	TELO	TNA	
Sirisena, Maithripala	POL	52,421	19 December 2001	7 February 2004	SLFP	PA	SLFP	PA	
Sirisena, R. A. D.	KEG	44,627	19 December 2001	7 February 2004	UNP	UNF	UNP	UNF	Project Minister of Samurdhi (01-).
Siththarathan, Tharumalingam	VAN	4,468	19 December 2001	7 February 2004	PLOTE	DPLF	PLOTE	DPLF	
Sivalingam, Muthu	NUW	107,338	19 December 2001	7 February 2004	CWC	UNF	CWC	UNF	Deputy Minister of Agriculture & Livestock (01-).
Sivasithamparam, Murugesu	NAT		19 December 2001	5 June 2002	TULF	TNA	TULF	TNA	Died. Replaced by Kathirgamathamby Thurairetnasingam.
Siyambalapitiya, Ranjith	KEG	49,298	19 December 2001	7 February 2004	SLFP	PA	SLFP	PA	
Soyza, Vijith Wijayamuni	MON	30,724	19 December 2001	7 February 2004	SLFP	PA	SLFP	PA	
Subasinghe, S. K.	NAT		19 December 2001	7 February 2004	JVP		JVP		
Tennakoon, Janaka Bandara	MTL	49,959	19 December 2001	7 February 2004	SLFP	PA	SLFP	PA	
Tennakoon, Kumari	KUR	42,914	19 December 2001	7 February 2004	SLFP	PA	SLFP	PA	
Tennakoon, Thilina Bandara	KAN	51,542	19 December 2001	7 February 2004	SLFP	PA	SLFP	PA	
Thangavadivel, Thambirajah	BAT	24,475	19 December 2001	7 February 2004	TELO	TNA	TELO	TNA	
Thewarapperuma, A. K.	AMP	26,361	19 December 2001	7 February 2004	SLFP	PA	SLFP	PA	
Thissera, Dayasritha	PUT	32,457	19 December 2001	7 February 2004	SLFP	PA	SLFP	PA	
Thondaman, Arumugan	NUW	121,542	19 December 2001	7 February 2004	CWC	UNF	CWC	UNF	Minister of Housing & Plantation Infrastructure (01-).
Thowfeek, K. M.	TRI	24,847	19 December 2001	7 February 2004	UNP	UNF	UNP	UNF	
Thowfeek, M. S.	NAT		19 December 2001	7 February 2004	SLMC	UNF	SLMC	UNF	
Thurairetnasingam, K.	NAT			7 February 2004	TULF	TNA	TULF	TNA	Replaces Murugesu Sivasithamparam.
Tissera, Sugath	PUT	36,218	19 December 2001	7 February 2004	UNP	UNF	UNP	UNF	
Umma, Anjan	GAM	10,834	19 December 2001	7 February 2004	JVP		JVP		
Velayutham, Karupaiyah	BAD	40,753	19 December 2001	7 February 2004	UNP	UNF	UNP	UNF	
Vinayagamoorthy, Appathurai	JAF	19,472	19 December 2001	7 February 2004	ACTC	TNA	ACTC	TNA	
Wanniarachchi, Pavithra Devi	RAT	84,173	19 December 2001	7 February 2004	SLFP	PA	SLFP	PA	
Wedaarachchi, Dilip	HAM	38,972	19 December 2001	7 February 2004	UNP	UNF	UNP	UNF	
Weerakoon, Athula Indika	GAL	2,938	19 December 2001	7 February 2004	JVP		JVP		
Weerawansa, Wimal	COL	19,687	19 December 2001	7 February 2004	JVP		JVP		
Welgama, Kumara	KAL	81,507	19 December 2001	7 February 2004	SLFP	PA	SLFP	PA	
Wickremanayake, Ratnasiri	KAL	120,432	19 December 2001	7 February 2004	SLFP	PA	SLFP	PA	Leader of the Opposition (01–02).
Wickremarathne, D. D. W.	BAD	33,513	19 December 2001	7 February 2004	SLFP	PA	SLFP	PA	
Wickremasinghe, Ranil	COL	415,686	19 December 2001	7 February 2004	UNP	UNF	UNP	UNF	Prime Minister (01–04). Minister of Policy Development & Implementation (01-).
Wijekoon, Jayasundera	NAT		19 December 2001	7 February 2004	UNP	UNF	UNP	UNF	
Wijemanna, Lakshman	KAL	45,766	19 December 2001	7 February 2004	UNP	UNF	UNP	UNF	
Wijesekara, Mahinda	MTR	95,378	19 December 2001	7 February 2004	UNP	UNF	UNP	UNF	Minister of Fisheries & Ocean Resources (01-).
Wijethunga, A. A.	RAT	43,081	19 December 2001	7 February 2004	UNP	UNF	UNP	UNF	
Yalegama, Bandula	MTL	35,450	19 December 2001	7 February 2004	SLFP	PA	SLFP	PA	
Yapa, Anura Priyadharshana	KUR	67,717	19 December 2001	7 February 2004	SLFP	PA	SLFP	PA	
Yogarajan, Ramaiah	NAT		19 December 2001	7 February 2004	CWC	UNF	CWC	UNF	
