= Gayantha Karunathilaka =

Sri Lankan politician

Hon. Gayantha Karunathilaka MP
- ගයන්ත කරුණාතිලක கயந்த கருணாதிலக
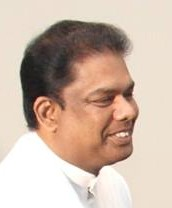

Chief Opposition Whip
- Incumbent
- Assumed office 3 December 2024
- Preceded by: Lakshman Kiriella
- In office 3 January 2020 – 3 March 2020
- Preceded by: Mahinda Amaraweera
- Succeeded by: Lakshman Kiriella

Minister of Lands and Parliamentary Reforms
- In office 22 May 2017 – 21 November 2019
- President: Maithripala Sirisena
- Prime Minister: Ranil Wickremesinghe
- Preceded by: John Amaratunga
- Succeeded by: S. M. Chandrasena

Minister of Media
- In office 12 January 2015 – 22 May 2017
- President: Maithripala Sirisena
- Prime Minister: Ranil Wickremesinghe
- Preceded by: Keheliya Rambukwella
- Succeeded by: Mangala Samaraweera

Chief Government Whip
- In office 20 January 2015 – 3 January 2020
- Preceded by: Dinesh Gunawardena
- Succeeded by: Johnston Fernando

Member of Parliament for Galle District
- Incumbent
- Assumed office 2000

Personal details
- Born: 21 August 1962 (age 64)
- Party: Samagi Jana Balawegaya (since 2020); United National Party (until 2020)
- Other political affiliations: United National Front
- Education: Royal College, Colombo
- Occupation: Politics

Lokugamage Gayantha Ganadesha Karunatileka, MP (born 21 August 1962) is a Sri Lankan politician. He is the current Chief Opposition Whip of the Parliament of Sri Lanka. He formerly served as a Cabinet Minister of Lands and Parliament affairs and Chief Government Whip. A former member of the United National Party (UNP), he served as the UNP Media Secretary and acted as the cabinet spokesman of the government.

He was educated at Royal College Colombo. He is the nephew of Rupa Karunathilake.

== See also ==
- List of political families in Sri Lanka

== References & External links ==
- Biographies of Member of Parliament
