= Sugath Wasantha de Silva =

Member of Parliament of Sri Lanka

Hon. Sugath Wasantha De Silva MP
- සුගත් වසන්ත ද සිල්වා சுகத் வசந்த டி சில்வா

Chairman of the Sri Lanka Council of Visually Handicapped Graduates

Member of Parliament for National List
- Incumbent
- Assumed office 21 November 2024

Personal details
- Born: 1967; 59 years ago Balapitiya, SouthernProvince, Dominion of Ceylon
- Party: National People's Power; Janatha Vimukthi Peramuna (Since 1994)
- Spouse: Nalini Ranasinghe
- Education: The School for the Blind, Ratmalana; Dharmasoka College, Ambalangoda
- Alma mater: University of Colombo
- Profession: Social Services Officer

Sugath Wasantha de Silva is a Sri Lankan social services officer and a member of the Parliament of Sri Lanka from National ist since 2024 as a member of the National People's Power. He is the first to represent parliament from the disabled community in Sri Lanka. He is also a chairman of the Sri Lanka Council of Visually Handicapped Graduates. Before his political career, de Silva was a well-known activist advocating for the rights of the visually impaired and disabled communities.
