= Leader of the Opposition (Sri Lanka) =

Parliamentary position of Sri Lanka

Leader of the Opposition of Sri Lanka
- ශ්‍රී ලංකා විපක්ෂ නායක இலங்கை எதிர்க்கட்சித் தலைவர்
- Emblem of Sri Lanka

- Flag of Sri Lanka

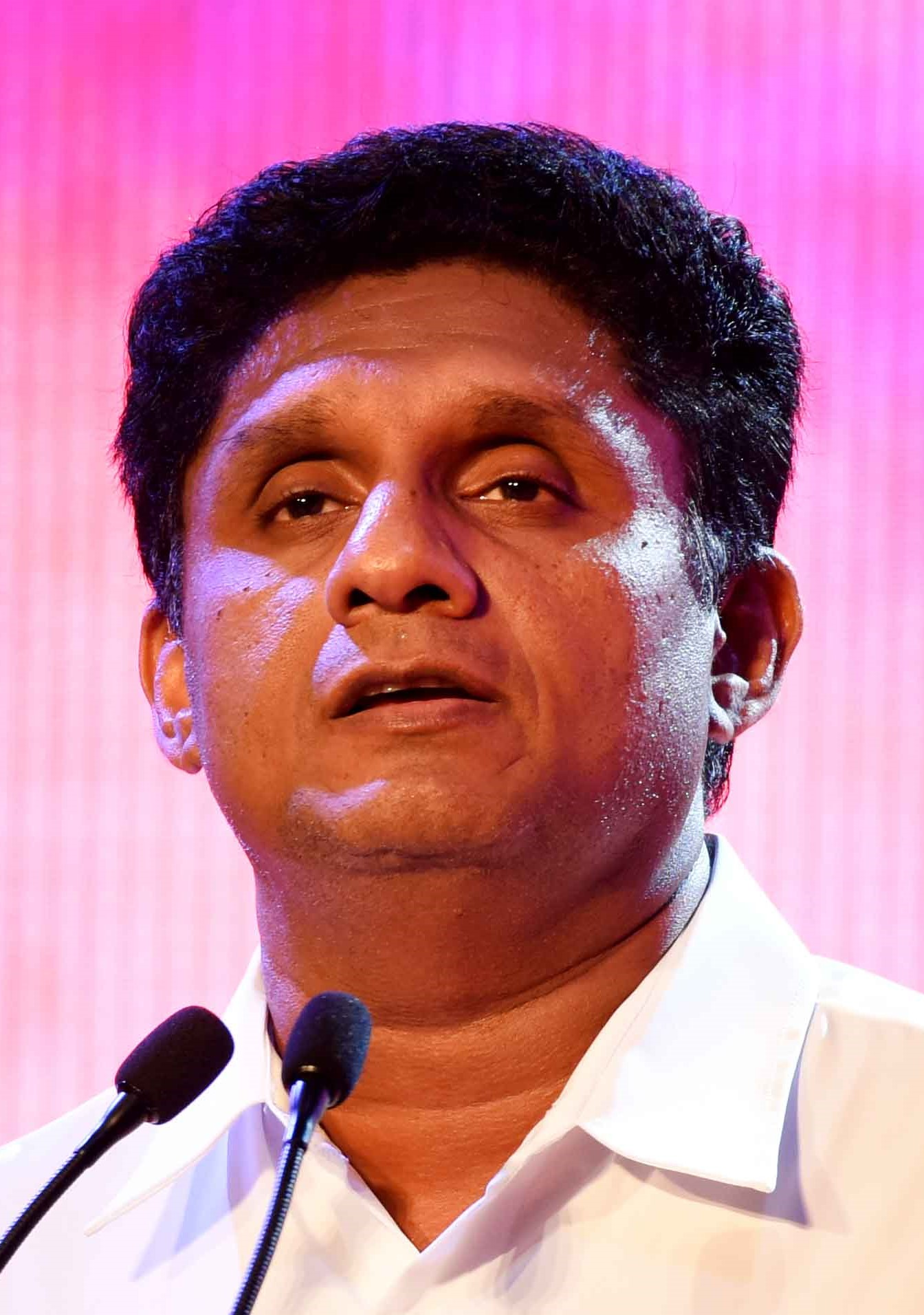
- Incumbent; Sajith Premadasa since 3 January 2020
- Style: The Honourable
- Appointer: Parliament of Sri Lanka
- Term length: While leader of the largest political party in Parliament that is not in government
- Inaugural holder: N. M. Perera
- Formation: 14 October 1947

In Sri Lanka, the leader of the opposition is the leader of the largest political party in Parliament that is not a part of the government. This is usually the leader of the second-largest party in Parliament.

Leader of the Samagi Jana Balawegaya Sajith Premadasa has been the incumbent leader of the opposition in the Parliament since 3 January 2020. He was officially sworn in on 20 August 2020, after the speaker announced his appointment in parliament.

== Privileges of office ==
=== Salary ===
In 2016, the leader of the opposition received a salary month and other entitlements of a Member of Parliament.

=== Other privileges ===
The leader of the opposition is entitled to an official residence, office, transport and security equal that of a Cabinet Minister.

=== Order of precedence ===
In the Sri Lankan order of precedence, the leader of the opposition is ranked at the level of a Cabinet Minister in the order of precedence.

== List of leaders of the opposition ==
Parties

Lanka Sama Samaja Party Sri Lanka Freedom Party United National Party Tamil United Liberation Front Ilankai Tamil Arasu Kachchi Sri Lanka Podujana Peramuna Samagi Jana Balawegaya

No. (Terms)	Portrait	Name (Birth–Death)	Political party	Term of office			Parliament (Election)
No. (Terms)	Portrait	Name (Birth–Death)	Political party	Took office	Left office	Days	Parliament (Election)
1		N. M. Perera ඇන්. ඇම්. පෙරේරා (1905–1979)	Lanka Sama Samaja Party	14 October 1947	8 April 1952	1638	1st (1947)
2		S. W. R. D. Bandaranaike එස්. ඩබ්. ආර්. ඩී. බණ්ඩාරනායක (1899–1959)	Sri Lanka Freedom Party	9 June 1952	18 February 1956	1349	2nd (1952)
(1)		N. M. Perera ඇන්. ඇම්. පෙරේරා (1905–1979)	Lanka Sama Samaja Party	19 April 1956	5 December 1959	1325	3rd (1956)
3		C. P. de Silva සී. පී. ද සිල්වා (1912–1972)	Sri Lanka Freedom Party	30 March 1960	23 April 1960	24	4th (Mar 1960)
4		Dudley Senanayake ඩඩ්ලි සේනානායක (1911–1973)	United National Party	5 August 1960	17 December 1964	1595	5th (Jul 1960)
5		Sirimavo Bandaranaike සිරිමාවෝ බණ්ඩාරනායක (1916–2000)	Sri Lanka Freedom Party	5 April 1965	25 March 1970	1815	6th (1965)
6		J. R. Jayewardene ජේ. ආර්. ජයවර්ධන (1906–1996)	United National Party	7 June 1970	18 May 1977	2537	7th (1970)
7		A. Amirthalingam அப்பாப்பிள்ளை அமிர்தலிங்கம் (1927–1989)	Tamil United Liberation Front	4 August 1977	24 October 1983	2272	8th (1977)
	Office vacant			24 October 1983	8 November 1983	15	8th (1977)
8		Anura Bandaranaike අනුර බණ්ඩාරනායක (1949–2008)	Sri Lanka Freedom Party	8 November 1983	20 December 1988	1869	8th (1977)
(5)		Sirimavo Bandaranaike සිරිමාවෝ බණ්ඩාරනායක (1916–2000)	Sri Lanka Freedom Party	9 March 1989	24 June 1994	1933	9th (1989)
9		Gamini Dissanayake ගාමිණි දිසානායක (1942–1994)	United National Party	25 August 1994	24 October 1994	60	10th (1994)
	Office vacant			24 October 1994	28 October 1994	4	10th (1994)
10		Ranil Wickremesinghe රනිල් වික්‍රමසිංහ (born 1949)	United National Party	28 October 1994	10 October 2001	2539	10th (1994)
10		Ranil Wickremesinghe රනිල් වික්‍රමසිංහ (born 1949)	United National Party	28 October 1994	10 October 2001	2539	11th (2000)
11		Ratnasiri Wickremanayake රත්නසිරි වික්‍රමනායක (1933–2016)	Sri Lanka Freedom Party	18 December 2001	31 January 2002	44	12th (2001)
	Office vacant			31 January 2002	6 February 2002	6	12th (2001)
12		Mahinda Rajapaksa මහින්ද රාජපක්ෂ (born 1945)	Sri Lanka Freedom Party	6 February 2002	7 February 2004	731	12th (2001)
(10)		Ranil Wickremesinghe රනිල් වික්‍රමසිංහ (born 1949)	United National Party	22 April 2004	9 January 2015	3914	13th (2004)
(10)		Ranil Wickremesinghe රනිල් වික්‍රමසිංහ (born 1949)	United National Party	22 April 2004	9 January 2015	3914	14th (2010)
	Office vacant			9 January 2015	16 January 2015	7	14th (2010)
13		Nimal Siripala de Silva නිමල් සිරිපාල ද සිල්වා (born 1944)	Sri Lanka Freedom Party	16 January 2015	26 June 2015	161	14th (2010)
14		R. Sampanthan இரா. சம்பந்தன் (1933–2024)	Ilankai Tamil Arasu Kachchi	3 September 2015	18 December 2018	1202	15th (2015)
(12)		Mahinda Rajapaksa මහින්ද රාජපක්ෂ (born 1945)	Sri Lanka Podujana Peramuna	18 December 2018	21 November 2019	338	15th (2015)
	Office vacant			21 November 2019	3 January 2020	43	15th (2015)
15		Sajith Premadasa සජිත් ප්‍රේමදාස (born 1967)	Samagi Jana Balawegaya	3 January 2020	Incumbent	2467	15th (2015)
15		Sajith Premadasa සජිත් ප්‍රේමදාස (born 1967)	Samagi Jana Balawegaya	3 January 2020	Incumbent	2467	16th (2020)
15		Sajith Premadasa සජිත් ප්‍රේමදාස (born 1967)	Samagi Jana Balawegaya	3 January 2020	Incumbent	2467	17th (2024)

== List of leaders of the opposition by length of term ==
No.	Name	Party	No. of terms	Length of term	
No.	Name	Party	No. of terms	Longest continuous term	Total duration of leadership
1	Ranil Wickremesinghe	UNP	2	10 years, 262 days	17 years, 258 days
2	Sirimavo Bandaranaike	SLFP	2	5 years, 107 days	10 years, 67 days
3	N. M. Perera	LSSP	2	4 years, 177 days	8 years, 43 days
4	J. R. Jayewardene	UNP	1	6 years, 345 days	6 years, 345 days
5	Sajith Premadasa	SJB	1	6 years, 275 days	6 years, 275 days
6	A. Amirthalingam	TULF	1	6 years, 81 days	6 years, 81 days
7	Anura Bandaranaike	SLFP	1	5 years, 42 days	5 years, 42 days
8	Dudley Senanayake	UNP	1	4 years, 134 days	4 years, 134 days
9	S. W. R. D. Bandaranaike	SLFP	1	3 years, 244 days	3 years, 244 days
10	R. Sampanthan	ITAK	1	3 years, 106 days	3 years, 106 days
11	Mahinda Rajapaksa	SLFP/SLPP	2	2 years, 1 day	2 years, 338 days
12	Nimal Siripala de Silva	SLFP	1	161 days	161 days
13	Gamini Dissanayake	UNP	1	60 days	60 days
14	Ratnasiri Wickremanayake	SLFP	1	44 days	44 days
15	C. P. de Silva	SLFP	1	24 days	24 days

== See also ==
- President of Sri Lanka
  - List of presidents of Sri Lanka
- Prime Minister of Sri Lanka
  - List of prime ministers of Sri Lanka
