= Nimal Siripala de Silva =

Sri Lankan politician (born 1944)

Hon. Nimal Siripala de Silva
- නිමල් සිරිපාල ද සිල්වා நிமல் சிறிபால டி சில்வா
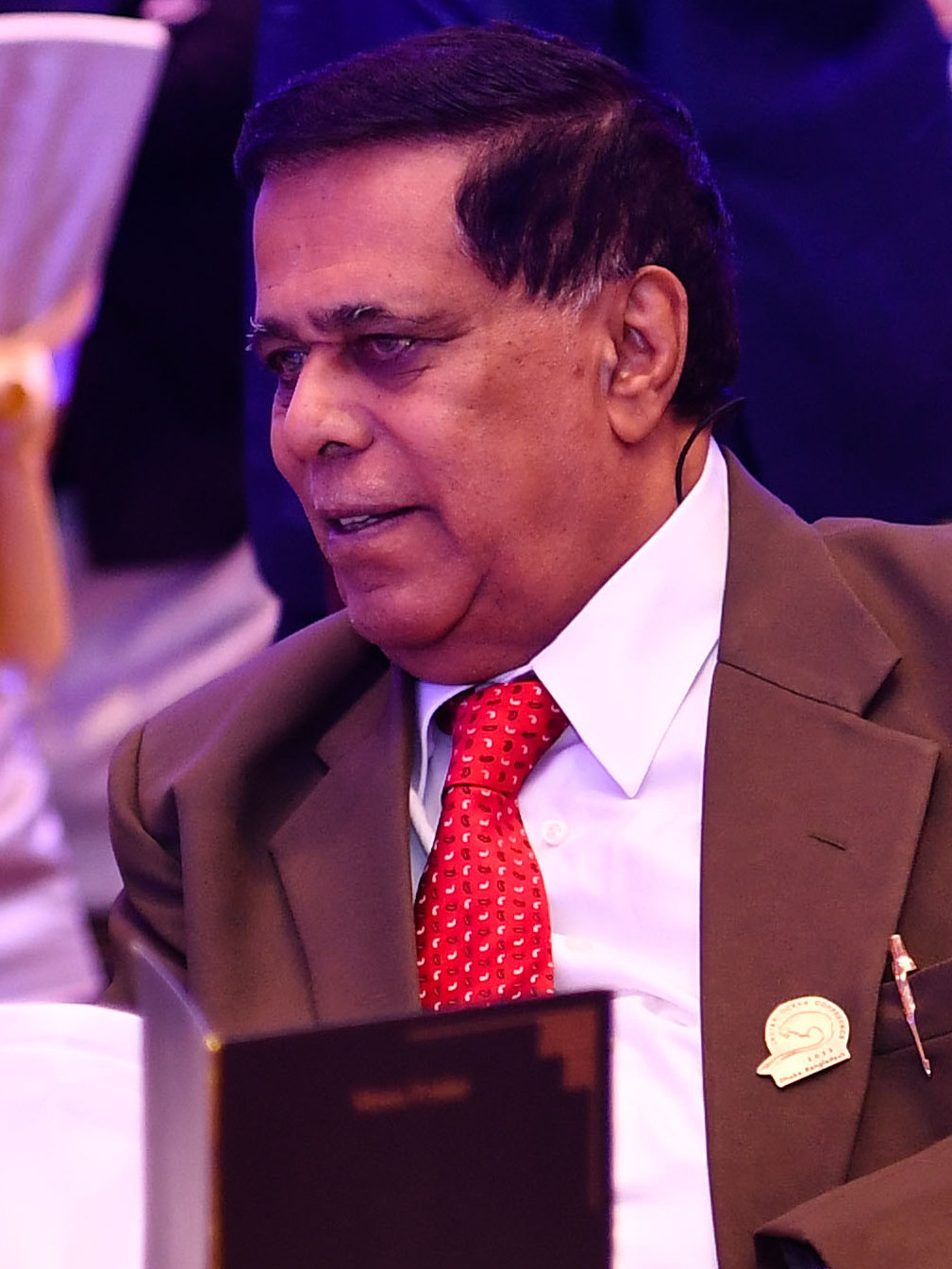
- Silva at Indian Ocean Conference in Dhaka (2023)

7th Chairperson of the Sri Lanka Freedom Party
- Incumbent
- Assumed office 2024; Disputed
- Preceded by: Maithripala Sirisena

Minister of Ports, Shipping and Aviation
- In office 20 May 2022 – 23 September 2024
- President: Gotabaya Rajapaksa; Ranil Wickramasinghe
- Prime Minister: Ranil Wickramasinghe; Dinesh Gunawardena
- Preceded by: Pramitha Tennakoon
- Succeeded by: Vijitha Herath

Minister of Labour
- In office 12 August 2020 – 18 April 2022
- President: Gotabaya Rajapaksa
- Prime Minister: Mahinda Rajapaksa
- Preceded by: Dullas Alahapperuma
- Succeeded by: Vidura Wickremanayake
- In office 4 September 2015 – 26 October 2018
- President: Maithripala Sirisena
- Prime Minister: Ranil Wickremesinghe
- Preceded by: Ranjith Maddumabandara
- Succeeded by: Arjuna Ranatunga

Minister of Justice
- In office 22 November 2019 – 12 August 2020
- President: Gotabaya Rajapaksa
- Prime Minister: Mahinda Rajapaksa
- Preceded by: Thalatha Atukorale
- Succeeded by: Ali Sabry

13th Leader of the Opposition
- In office 16 January 2015 – 26 June 2015
- President: Maithripala Sirisena
- Prime Minister: Ranil Wickremesinghe
- Preceded by: Ranil Wickremesinghe
- Succeeded by: R. Sampanthan

Leader of the House
- In office 09 August 2005 – 20 January 2015
- Preceded by: Maithripala Sirisena
- Succeeded by: Lakshman Kiriella

Member of Parliament for Badulla District
- In office 2000–2024

Member of Parliament for Colombo District
- In office 1989–2000

Personal details
- Born: 6 September 1944 (age 82) Badulla, British Ceylon
- Party: Sri Lanka Freedom Party
- Other political affiliations: Sri Lanka People's Freedom Alliance (2019 – Present); United People's Freedom Alliance (2004 – 2019); People's Alliance (1994 – 2004)
- Education: Nalanda College, Colombo
- Occupation: Politics
- Profession: Proctor

Nilenthi Nimal Siripala de Silva (born 6 September 1944) is a Sri Lankan politician who held a number of senior cabinet portfolios. He currently serves as the disputed chairman of the Sri Lanka Freedom Party. He served as the Leader of the Opposition for a few months in 2015, and has served in several other ministerial posts: he is the former Cabinet Minister of Transport and Civil Aviation in 15th Parliament of Sri Lanka, former Minister of Irrigation and Water Resources Management, the Minister of Ports, Shipping and Aviation and former Leader of the House.

== Early life and education ==
De Silva was born to a family of teachers in Badulla. He was educated at Nalanda College, Colombo where he was a member of the college debating team. He entered Colombo Law College in 1966 and qualified as a proctor in 1971.

== Early career ==
Having started his legal practice in 1971, de Silva was active in politics from his student years, having started the Sri Lanka Freedom Party Law Students Association. He supported Sirimavo Bandaranaike in her campaign in the 1970 general election. He travelled to the United Kingdom in 1975 and qualified as a solicitor. He returned to Sri Lanka in 1978, and assisted Bandaranaike in her defense against the Special Presidential Commission appointed by President J. R. Jayawardene to investigate allegations against Bandaranaike for abuses of power during her tenure as prime minister.

== Political career ==
He entered parliament in 1989 having been elected from the Colombo Electoral District in the 1989 general election and was re-elected from Colombo till 2000, when he was elected from Badulla Electoral District and had been re-elected consecutively till 2024. He was the Assembly President of the World Health Organization.

== Assassination attempt ==
On 4 July 1996, De Silva escaped with injuries in an attempted assassination by a LTTE female suicide bomber at the Stanley Road in Jaffna. This incident took place minutes after the Minister declared open a branch of Building Materials Corporation (BMC) in Jaffna. Brigadier Ananda Hamangoda (Jaffna Sector Commander), Ranjith Godamuna (Chairman, Lanka Cement) and 21 others were killed with more than 50 injured in the explosion.

== See also ==
- Cabinet of Sri Lanka

== Sources ==
- Biographies of Present Members
- "Old Nalandians elected MPs to be felicitated". Daily News. Archived from the original on 2 April 2002.
- "Opposition weaker than ever before -Minister Nimal Siripala De Silva". Sunday Observer.
- "International concerns on Lanka elections unfounded: Minister". India.com. 11 November 2018 – via PTI.
