= 8th Parliament of Sri Lanka =

1977–1989 meeting of the Sri Lankan legislature

←	7th	9th	→

Overview
- Legislative body: Parliament of Sri Lanka
- Term: 22 July 1977 – 8 March 1989
- Election: 21 July 1977

Senior parliamentarians
- Speaker: Anandatissa de Alwis, UNP (1977–78); Abdul Bakeer Markar, UNP (1978–83); E. L. Senanayake, UNP (1983–89)
- Deputy Speaker and Chairman of Committees: M. A. Bakeer Markar, UNP (1977–78); Norman Waidyaratne, UNP (1978–88)
- Deputy Chairman of Committees: Edmund Samarawickrema, UNP
- Prime Minister: J. R. Jayewardene, UNP (1977–78); Ranasinghe Premadasa, UNP (1978–89)
- Leader of the Opposition: A. Amirthalingam, TULF (1977–83); Anura Bandaranaike, SLFP (1983–88)
- Leader of the House: Ranasinghe Premadasa, UNP (1977–88); Ranil Wickremesinghe, UNP (1989)
- Chief Government Whip: Vincent Perera, UNP
- Chief Opposition Whip: X. M. Sellathambu, TULF (1977–83); Lakshman Jayakody, SLFP (1983–89)

The 8th Parliament of Sri Lanka, known officially as the 1st Parliament of the Democratic Socialist Republic of Sri Lanka, was a meeting of the Parliament of Sri Lanka, with the membership determined by the results of the 1977 parliamentary election held on 21 July 1977. The parliament met for the first time on 22 July 1977 and was dissolved on 8 March 1989.

The United National Party won a 5/6 majority to form a government under J. R. Jayewardene. Later Jayawardane introduced a new constitution to Sri Lanka and was elected as the 1st Executive President of Sri Lanka.

On 22 December 1982, the 1982 Sri Lankan national referendum was held, giving the people of Sri Lanka the option to extend the life of parliament by 6 years without an election. It was the first and so far only national referendum to be held in Sri Lanka. The referendum was called for by President Jayawardene, who had been elected to a fresh six-year term as president in October 1982. The government extended their term to stay in power in 1983 without an election and stayed in power until 1989.

== Results ==
The UNP won the largest landslide in Sri Lankan history (due to the first-past-the-post system). For the first time, a Tamil party won the second-highest number of seats in Parliament and became the Official Opposition.

Abeyratne Pilapitiya of the UNP was elected MP for Kalawana, but was subsequently unseated in an election petition. Sarath Muttetuwegama of the Communist Party was returned to Parliament in the ensuing by-election.

The 1977 election was the only one ever held under the 1972 constitution.

Party	Votes	%	Seats
United National Party	3,179,221	50.92	140
Sri Lanka Freedom Party	1,855,331	29.72	8
Tamil United Liberation Front	421,488	6.75	18
Lanka Sama Samaja Party	225,317	3.61	0
Communist Party of Sri Lanka	123,856	1.98	0
Ceylon Workers' Congress	62,707	1.00	1
Mahajana Eksath Peramuna	22,639	0.36	0
Independents	353,014	5.65	1
Total	6,243,573	100.00	168
Registered voters/turnout	6,667,589	–	
Source: Kusaka Research Institute

== Electorate Results ==
=== Western Province ===
==== Colombo District ====
Electorate	Name of the Elected	Symbol
Colombo North	M. Vincent Perera	Elephant
Colombo Central	R.Premadasa	Elephant
Colombo Central	M.Jabir A. Cader	Eye
Colombo Central	M.Haleem Ishak	Hand
Borella	M.H.Mohomed	Elephant
Colombo East	A.Edmund Samarawickrema	Elephant
Colombo West	J.R.Jayewardene	Elephant
Dehiwala	S. de S. Jayasinghe	Elephant
Ratmalana	Lalith Athulathmudali	Elephant
Kolonnawa	Weerasinghe Mallimaratchchi	Elephant
Kotte	Ananda Tissa de Alwis	Elephant
Kaduwela	M.D.H. Jayawardana	Elephant
Awissawella	M.D.Premarathna	Eephant
Homagama	Gamani Jayasuriya	Elephant
Maharagama	Premaratne Gunasekera	Elephant
Kesbewa	Dharmasena Attigalle	Elephant
Moratuwa	Tyronne Fernando	Elephant

==== Gampaha District ====
Electorate	Name of the Elected	Symbol
Wattala	D. Shelton Jayasinghe	Elephant
Negambo	N. Denzil Fernando	Elephant
Katana	Wijayapala Mendis	Elephant
Divulapitiya	Ariyaratne Jayatillake	Elephant
Mirigama	Mahendra Wijeratne	Elephant
Minuwangoda	Bennet Gunasekera	Elephant
Attanagalla	Sirimavo Ratwatte Dias	Hand
Gampaha	S. D. Bandaranayake	Hand
Ja-ela	Joseph Michael Perera	Elephant
Mahara	Tudor Gunasekera	Elephant
Dompe	Sarathchandra Rajakaruna	Elephant
Biyagama	Ranil Wickremasinghe	Elephant
Kelaniya	Kaluwadewage Cyril Mathew	Elephant

==== Kalutara District ====
Electorate	Name of the Elected	Symbol
Panadura	Neville Fernando	Elephant
Bandaragama	Senaraja Samaranayake	Elephant
Horana	Indradasa Hettiarachchi	Elephant
Bulathsinhala	O.S. Perera	Elephant
Mathugama	Reginold V. Wijegooneratne	Elephant
Kalutara	V.L.Wijemanne	Elephant
Beruwala	Bakeer Markar Abduli	Elephant
Agalawatta	Merill Kariyawasam	Elephant

=== Central Province ===
==== Matale District ====
Electorate	Name of the Elected	Symbol
Dambulla	K. W. R. M. Ekananayake	Elephant
Laggala	K. Y. M. Wijeratne Banda	Elephant
Matale	Alick Aluvihare	Elephant
Rattota	P. B. Kaviratne	Elephant

==== Kandy District ====
Electorate	Name of the Elected	Symbol
Galagedara	W. M. G. T. Banda	Elephant
Harispattuwa	Abdul Cader Sahul Hameed	Elephant
Harispattuwa	R. Premachandra Wijesiri	Umbrella
Pathadumbara	T. B. Werapitiya	Elephant
Udadumbara	R. B. Attanayake	Elephant
Teldeniya	Gamini Rajapakse	Elephant
Kundasale	D. M. Chandrapala	Elephant
Hewaheta	Anura Daniel	Elephant
Senkadagala	Shelton Ranaraja	Elephant
Mahanuwara	E. L. Senanayake	Elephant
Yatinuwara	Sunil Subasiri Abeysundara	Elephant
Udunuwara	D. B. Wijetunga	Elephant
Gampola	W. P. B. Dissanayake	Elephant

==== Nuwaraeliya District ====
Electorate	Name of the Elected	Symbol
Navalapitiya	Chandradra Karunaratne	Elephant
Nuwaraeliya Maskeliya	Gamini Dissanayake	Elephant
Nuwaraeliya Maskeliya	Anura Bandaranaike	Hand
Nuwaraeliya Maskeliya	S. Thondaman	Cockerei
Kothmale	Ananda Dassanayake	Hand
Hanguranketha	George Abeygoonasekera	Elephant
Walapane	Renuka Herath (Mrs.)	Elephant

=== Southern Province ===
==== Galle District ====
Electorate	Name of the Elected	Symbol
Balapitiya	Norman Waidyaratna	Elephant
Ambalangoda	Raitor Thilakasekara	Elephant
Karandeniya	Bandulahewa Senadheera	Elephant
Bentara-Elpitiya	Rupasena Karunatilake	Elephant
Hiniduma	M.S. Amarasiri	Elephant
Baddegama	E.D. Wickrematilaka	Elephant
Rathgma	Edwin Thilakaratne	Elephant
Galle	Albert de Silva	Elephant
Akmeemana	Sumanadasa Abeywickrama	Elephant
Habaraduwa	P. Sumathiratne	Elephant

==== Matara District ====
Electorate	Name of the Elected	Symbol
Hakmana	Harshanath Wanigasekara	Elephant
Akuressa	Dayananda Wickremasinghe	Elephant
Kamburupitiya	Don Edwin Malawaraarachchi	Elephant
Devinuwara	Ronnie de Mel	Elephant
Matara	S.K. Piyadasa	Elephant
Weligama	Montague Jayawickrema	Elephant
Deniyaya	Keerthi Abeywickrama	Elephant

==== Hambantota District ====
Electorate	Name of the Elected	Symbol
Mulkirigala	T.D.Fransisku	Elephant
Beliatta	Ranjith Atapattu	Elephant
Tangalle	Jinadasa Weerasinghe	Elephant
Tissamaharama	P.M.B. Cyril	Elephant

=== Northern Province ===
==== Jaffna District ====
Electorate	Name of the Elected	Symbol
Kayts	K.P. Ratnam	Sun
Waddukkodai	T. Thirunavukarasu	Sun
Kankesanthurai	A. Amirthalingam	Sun
Kopai	S. Kathiravelupillai	Sun
Udduppidi	T. Rasalingam	Sun
Point-Pedro	K. Thurairatnam	Sun
Chavakachcheri	V.N. Navaratnam	Sun
Nallur	M. Sivasithamparam	Sun
Jaffna	V. Yogeswaran	Sun

==== Vanni District ====
Electorate	Name of the Elected	Symbol
Kilinochchi	V. Anandasangary	Sun
Mannar	P.S. Soosaithasan	Sun
Mulativu	X.M.Sellathambu	Sun
Vavuniya	T. Sivasithamparam	Sun

=== Eastern Province ===
==== Trincomalee District ====
Electorate	Name of the Elected	Symbol
Seruvila	H.D.L. Leelaratne	Elephant
Trincomalee	R. Sampathan	Sun

==== Batticalao District ====
Electorate	Name of the Elected	Symbol
Mutur	M.E.H. Maharoof	Elephant
Kalkudah	K.W. Devanayagam	Elephant
Batticaloa	C.Rajadurai & Farid Meeralebbai	Sun & Elephant
Paddiruppu	P. Ganeshalingam	Sun

==== Ampara District ====
Electorate	Name of the Elected	Symbol
Ampara	P. Dayaratna	Elephant
Sammanthurai	M. A. Abdul Majeed	Elephant
Kalmunai	Abdul Rasak Mansoor	Elephant
Potuvil	M.A.M. Jalaldeen & C.Kanagaratnam	Elephant & -Sun

=== North Western Province ===
==== Puttalam District ====
Electorate	Name of the Elected	Symbol
Puttalam	M.H.M. Neina Marikkar	Elephant
Anamaduwa	Ashoka Wadigamangawa	Elephant
Chilaw	Harindra Corea	Elephant
Nattandiya	Harold Herath	Elephant
Wennappuwa	Festus Perera	Elephant

==== Kurunegala District ====
Electorate	Name of the Elected	Symbol
Galgamuwa	H.M.A. Lokubanda	Elephant
Nikaweratiya	H.B. Wanninayake	Elephant
Yapahuwa	H.B. Abeyratne	Elephant
Hiriyala	S.B. Herath	Elephant
Wariyapola	Amara Piyaseeli Ratnayake	Elephant
Panduwasnuwara	Kalubanda Ratnayake	Elephant
Bingiriya	J.L. Sirisena	Elephant
Katugampola	Gamini Jayawickrama Perera	Elephant
Kuliyapitiya	Lionel Jayatillake	Elephant
Dambadeniya	Ukkubanda Wijekoon	Elephant
Polgahawela	J.A.D.S. R. Jayakody	Elephant
Kurunegala	Dingiri Banda Welagedera	Elephant
Mawathagama	G.M. Premachandra	Elephant
Dodangaslanda	S.W. Alawatuwala	Elephant

=== North Central Province ===
==== Anuradapura District ====
Electorate	Name of the Elected	Symbol
Medawachchiya	Maithripala Senanayake	Hand
Horoupothana	E. L. B. Hurulle	Elephant
Anuradhapura East	W.Y. Herath	Elephant
Anuradhapura West	K.D.M.C. Bandara	Elephant
Kalawewa	A.M.S. Adikari	Elephant
Mihintale	Dayaratne Walagambahu	Elephant
Kekirawa	G.D. Mahindsoma	Elephant

==== Polonnaruwa District ====
Electorate	Name of the Elected	Symbol
Minneriya	Merril de Silva	Elephant
Medirigiriya	A.D.B. Ekanayake	Elephant
Polonnaruwa	H.G.P. Nelson	

=== Uva Province ===
==== Badulla District ====
Electorate	Name of the Elected	Symbol
Mahiyangana	C.P.J.Seneviratne	Elephant
Viyaluwa	Weerawanni Samaraweera	Elephant
Passara	W.M. Karunaratne	Elephant
Badulla	D. Vincent Perera	Elephant
Hali-ela	R.M. Abeykoon	Elephant
Uva-paranagama	R.M. Karunaratne	Elephant
Welimada	Percy Samaraweera	Elephant
Bandarawela	R.M.Apphamy	Elephant
Haputale	W.J.M.Lokubandara	Elephant

==== Monaragala District ====
Electorate	Name of the Elected	Symbol
Bibile	R.M.Dharmadasa Banda	Elephant
Moneragala	R.M. Punchi Bandara	Elephant
Wellawaya	J.M. Kumaradasa	Elephant

=== Sabaragamuwa Province ===
==== Kegalla District ====
Electorate	Name of the Elected	Symbol
Dedigama	Nissanka Parakrama Wijayaratne	Elephant
Galigamuwa	Wimala Kannangara (Mrs.)	Elephant
Kegalle	N.A. Seneviratne	Elephant
Rambukkana	Asoka Karunaratne	Elephant
Mawanella	C.R. Beligammana	Elephant
Aranayaka	Wasantha Udayaratne	Elephant
Yatiyantota	K. Vincent Perera	Elephant
Ruwanwella	P.C. Imbulana	Elephant
Deraniyagala	A.K.D. Wanigaratne	Elephant

==== Ratnapura District ====
Electorate	Name of the Elected	Symbol
Ehaliyagoda	Mervyn Kularatne	Elephant
Ratnapura	G.V. Punchinilame	Elephant
Pelmadulla	Chandrasekera Gankanda	Elephant
Balangoda	M.L.M.Aboosally	Elephant
Rakwana	H. Kularatne	Elephant
Nivitigala	Gamini Athukorale	Elephant
Kalawana	Abeyratna Pilapitiya	Elephant
Kolonna	Caluwadewage Nanda Mathew	Elephant

== Sources ==
- "1977 General Election Results". LankaNewspapers.com. Archived from the original on 2015-04-05.
- "Table 38 Parliament Election (1977)". Sri Lanka Statistics. 10 February 2009. Archived from the original on 9 October 2011.
- Rajasingham, K. T. (26 January 2002). "Chapter 24: Tamil militancy - a manifestation". Sri Lanka: The Untold Story. Asia Times. Archived from the original on 13 February 2002.
- Rajasingham, K. T. (2 February 2002). "Chapter 25: War or peace?". Sri Lanka: The Untold Story. Asia Times. Archived from the original on 16 April 2002.
