= Samagi Jana Balawegaya =

Political alliance in Sri Lanka

United People's Power සමගි ජන බලවේගය ஐக்கிய மக்கள் சக்தி
- Abbreviation: SJB
- Leader: Sajith Premadasa
- Chairman: Kabir Hashim
- Secretary: Ranjith Madduma Bandara
- Spokesman: S. M. Marikkar
- Founder: Sajith Premadasa
- Founded: 10 February 2020 (6 years ago)
- Split from: United National Party
- Preceded by: United National Front for Good Governance
- Headquarters: 815, E. W. Perera Mawatha, Ethulkotte, Kotte
- Youth wing: Samagi Tharuna Balawegaya
- Women's wing: Samagi Vanitha Balawegaya
- Ideology: Third Way; Social democracy Populism; Progressivism; Historical: Liberal conservatism
- Political position: Centre-right
- Colors: Green; Yellow
- Slogan: දිනමු Dinamu ('Let's win')
- Parliament of Sri Lanka: 40 / 225
- Local Government: 1,773 / 7,842

Election symbol
- Telephone

Website
- www.sjb.lk

The Samagi Jana Balawegaya (SJB; Sinhala: සමගි ජන බලවේගය, romanized: Samagi Jana Balavēgaya, Tamil: ஐக்கிய மக்கள் சக்தி, romanized: Aikkiya Makkaḷ Cakti, English: United People's Power) is a centrist political alliance led by Leader of the Opposition Sajith Premadasa. It is the largest opposition coalition in the Parliament of Sri Lanka since 2020.

The alliance was formed with the approval of the working committee of the United National Party (UNP) to contest in the 2020 Sri Lankan parliamentary election. On 11 February 2020, the election commission of Sri Lanka announced that they had accepted the new alliance as a recognised political coalition in Sri Lanka. Ranjith Madduma Bandara was named as the general secretary of the party. Other minor political parties like the Jathika Hela Urumaya (JHU), Sri Lanka Muslim Congress (SLMC) and the Tamil Progressive Alliance (TPA) joined the new alliance on 12 February 2020.

The alliance won 54 seats and became the main opposition just six months after its formation. While the alliance traces its political views to the liberal-conservative principles of the UNP, some members of the Sri Lankan media have argued that the SJB has gradually moved to the progressive and democratic political centre over time, and even espouses several social democratic (centre-left) ideals. Premadasa said the party rejects extreme forms of both capitalism and socialism and follows a centrist path to develop the country.

== History ==
On 30 January 2020, the United National Party working committee approved Sajith Premadasa as leader of the new alliance and its prime ministerial candidate. On 11 February, the Election Commission accepted the appointment of Opposition Leader Premadasa as the leader of Samagi Jana Balawegaya and Ranjith Madduma Bandara as General Secretary. On 13 February, the Jathika Hela Urumaya, Sri Lanka Muslim Congress and Tamil Progressive Alliance announced their support for the new alliance.

On 19 February, the United National Party working committee approved a swan for the symbol of a new UNP-led alliance.

On 2 March, the SJB was officially launched at Nelum Pokuna Colombo. On 9 March, the alliance opened its headquarters in Ethulkotte, Sri Jayawardenepura Kotte, and on the next day selected a telephone as its election symbol. The alliance handed in its nominations for 25 districts on 19 March for the 2020 general elections, the party's first election.

In May 2020, the Samagi Tharuna Balawegaya (youth wing) and Samagi Vanitha Balawegaya (women's wing) were launched.

Out of 77 UNP MPs, 52 joined the new alliance led by Premadasa. The working committee approved Premadasa as the leader of the alliance and gave him the power to chair the nomination board for the upcoming general elections in 2020. On 14 February 2020, both Premadasa and UNP leader Ranil Wickremesinghe agreed to contest the elections under the swan symbol and file nominations under the Samagi Jana Balawegaya banner to avoid a division in the United National Party. At the last moment, however, the SJB withdrew from the agreement and a majority of its members submitted nominations under the telephone symbol. Approximately 75 members of parliament joined the alliance. A minority of UNP members filed their nominations under the elephant symbol.

In the 2020 parliamentary elections held on 5 August, the alliance won 54 seats, thus becoming the main opposition party of the country. On 20 August, SJB leader Sajith Premadasa was inaugurated as the Leader of the Opposition.

=== Other participants ===
The Jathika Hela Urumaya, Tamil Progressive Alliance, and Sri Lanka Muslim Congress agreed to join the new alliance on 12 February 2020.

In December 2023, the SJB announced that they would form an alliance in 2024 with other political parties, including the Freedom People's Congress, a breakaway party of the ruling Sri Lanka Podujana Peramuna led by its former chairman G. L. Peiris. This alliance was launched as the Samagi Jana Sandanaya, and nominated party leader Sajith Premadasa as its candidate in the 2024 presidential elections.

== Overview ==
=== Member parties ===
The Samagi Jana Balawegaya consists of the following parties.

- All Ceylon Makkal Congress
- Freedom People's Congress (since 2024)
- Jathika Hela Urumaya
- Jathika Samagi Peramuna (National Unity Front)
- New Lanka Freedom Party (until 2024)
- Sri Lanka Freedom Party (Dayasiri wing) (since 2024)
- Sri Lanka Muslim Congress
- Tamil Progressive Alliance
  - Democratic People's Front
  - National Union of Workers
  - Up-Country People's Front
- United Republican Front (since 2023)

=== Symbol ===
The alliance announced that a landline telephone would be its electoral symbol on 10 March 2020.

=== Wings ===
- Youth wing – Samagi Tharuna Balawegaya
- Women's wing – Samagi Vanitha Balawegaya
- Veteran’s wing – Samagi Ranawiru Balawegaya

== Leadership ==
As of January 2026, the current office bearers of the SJB are as shown below.

Position	Name
Party Leader	Sajith Premadasa
General Secretary	Ranjith Madduma Bandara
Chairman	Kabir Hashim
Treasurer	Harsha de Silva
National Organizer	Tissa Attanayake
Chairwoman (Women's Wing)	Rohini Kaviratne
Chairman (Youth Wing)	Prasad Siriwardana

=== Leader ===
Name	Portrait	Period
Sajith Premadasa		February 2020 – present

=== General Secretary ===
Name	Portrait	Period
Ranjith Madduma Bandara		February 2020 – present

=== Chairmen ===
Name	Portrait	Period
Sarath Fonseka		February 2020 – August 2024
Imthiaz Bakeer Markar		September 2024 – May 2025
Kabir Hashim		April 2026 – present

=== Chairwoman (Women's Wing) ===
Name	Portrait	Period
Thalatha Atukorale		July 2020 – August 2024
Rohini Kaviratne		August 2024 – present

== Electoral history ==
=== Presidential ===
Election	Candidate	First round		Second round		Result	Ref
Election	Candidate	Votes	%	Votes	%	Result	Ref
2024	Sajith Premadasa	4,363,035	32.75%	4,530,902	44.11%	Lost	

=== Parliamentary ===
Election	Leader	Votes		Seats			Result	Ref
Election	Leader	No.	%	No.	+/–	%	Result	Ref
2020	Sajith Premadasa	2,771,984	23.90%	54 / 225	▲54	24.00%	Opposition	
2024	Sajith Premadasa	1,968,716	17.66%	40 / 225	▼14	17.78%	Opposition	

=== Local Authorities ===
Election	Leader	Votes		Councillors		Local Authorities	Ref
Election	Leader	No.	%	No.	+/–	Local Authorities	Ref
2024 (Elpitiya)	Sajith Premadasa	7,924	21.83%	6 / 30	▲6	0 / 1	
2025	Sajith Premadasa	2,258,480	21.69%	1,767 / 7,812	▲1767	27 / 341	
