= Jayatissa =

Jayatissa is a Sinhalese surname. Notable people with the surname include:

- Jayatissa Ranaweera (born 1956), Sri Lankan politician
- Nalinda Jayatissa (born 1977), Sri Lankan politician
- Roshan Jayatissa (born 1989), Sri Lankan cricketer
