= Susantha Punchinilame =

Sri Lankan politician

Hon. Susantha Punchinilame MP

Minister of Small Holder Development
- In office 2001–2004

Deputy Minister of Public Estate Management & Development
- In office 2007–2010

Deputy Minister of Fisheries & Aquatic Resources Development
- In office 2010 – 9 January 2015

Member of Parliament for Trincomalee District
- In office 2010–2020

Member of Parliament for Ratnapura District
- In office 1994–2010

Personal details
- Born: 6 April 1961 (age 65)
- Party: Sri Lanka Freedom Party; United National Party
- Other political affiliations: United People's Freedom Alliance

Galgamuwa Vidanalage Susantha Punchinilame (born 6 April 1961) is a Sri Lankan politician, originally from Ratnapura and the son of G. V. Punchinilame. He is a member of parliament and a government minister.

== Criminal charges ==
He was the main suspect in the murder of Nalanda Ellawala, a member of parliament who was killed during a shootout between supporters of the United National Party and the People's Alliance in Kuruwita on 11 February 1997. However, Punchinilame was cleared of all charges and subsequently released on 18 December 2013. Furthermore he is the main suspect of Padmasiri Threemavithana's murder in Koslanda, Sri Lanka.
