= A. A. Wijethunga =

Sri Lankan politician

Hon. A.A. Wijethunga MP
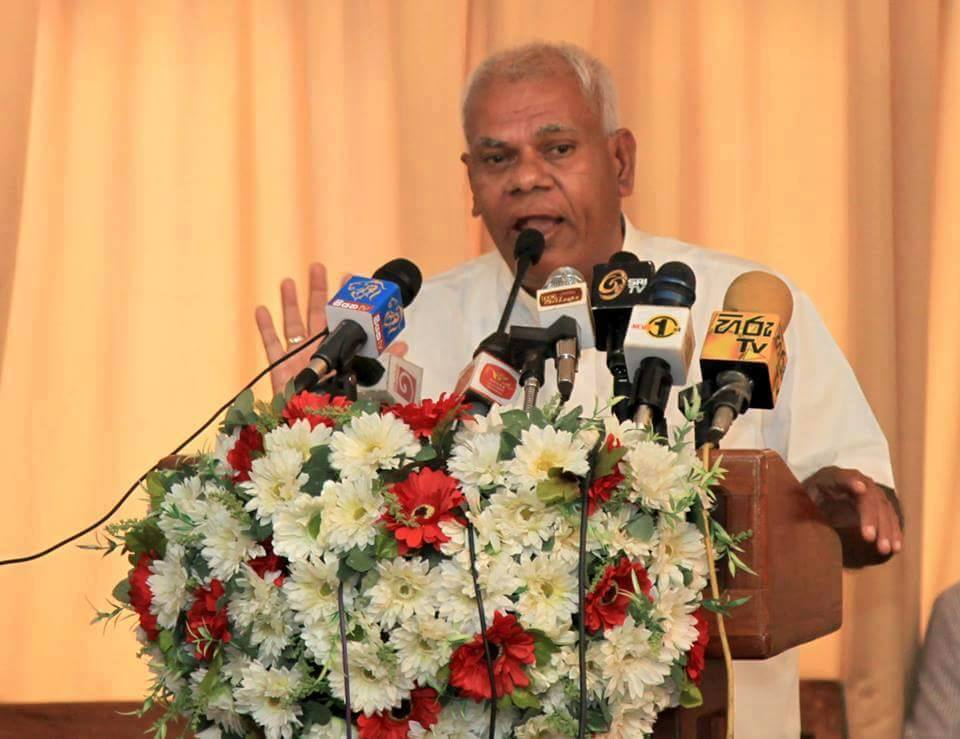

Member of Parliament for Ratnapura District
- Incumbent
- Assumed office 2015
- In office 2001–2004

Personal details
- Born: 16 November 1957 (age 68)
- Party: United National Party
- Children: 3 Tharaka Wijethunga

Abeysinghe Arachchilage Wijethunga (born 16 November 1957) is a Sri Lankan politician. He is a Member of the Parliament of Sri Lanka and former member of the Sabaragamuwa Provincial Council, Ratnapura District UNP Organizer and chief Organizer Kalawana.
