= Kolonna Polling Division =

Kolonna
- Polling Division
- Interactive map of Kolonna
- Coordinates: 6.363028°N 80.767047°E
- Country: Sri Lanka
- Province: Sabaragamuwa Province, Sri Lanka
- Electoral District: Ratnapura Electoral District

Area
  - Total: 554.31 km^{2} (214.02 sq mi)

Population (2012)
  - Total: 180,667
  - Density: 326/km^{2} (840/sq mi)
- ISO 3166 code: EC-21H

The Kolonna Polling Division is a Polling Division in the Ratnapura Electoral District, in the Sabaragamuwa Province, Sri Lanka.

== Presidential Election Results ==
=== Summary ===
The winner of Kolonna has matched the final country result 7 out of 8 times. Hence, Kolonna is a Strong Bellwether for Presidential Elections.

Year	Kolonna	Ratnapura Electoral District	MAE %	Sri Lanka	MAE %
2019	SLPP	SLPP	8.18%	SLPP	14.94%
2015	UPFA	UPFA	3.18%	NDF	11.29%
2010	UPFA	UPFA	2.75%	UPFA	8.47%
2005	UPFA	UPFA	4.20%	UPFA	6.97%
1999	PA	PA	2.09%	PA	2.09%
1994	PA	PA	7.02%	PA	2.85%
1988	UNP	UNP	1.72%	UNP	1.51%
1982	UNP	UNP	2.99%	UNP	1.17%
Matches/Mean MAE	7/8	7/8	4.02%	8/8	6.16%

=== 2019 Sri Lankan Presidential Election ===
Party	Kolonna		Ratnapura Electoral District		Sri Lanka	
Party	Votes	%	Votes	%	Votes	%
SLPP	83,520	68.05%	448,044	59.93%	6,924,255	52.25%
NDF	32,052	26.12%	264,503	35.38%	5,564,239	41.99%
NMPP	4,747	3.87%	18,887	2.53%	418,553	3.16%
Other Parties (with < 1%)	2,411	1.96%	16,237	2.17%	345,452	2.61%
Valid Votes	122,730	99.33%	747,671	99.22%	13,252,499	98.99%
Rejected Votes	828	0.67%	5,853	0.78%	135,452	1.01%
Total Polled	123,558	85.47%	753,524	87.11%	13,387,951	83.71%
Registered Electors	144,558		864,979		15,992,568	

=== 2015 Sri Lankan Presidential Election ===
Party	Kolonna		Ratnapura Electoral District		Sri Lanka	
Party	Votes	%	Votes	%	Votes	%
UPFA	65,270	59.00%	379,053	55.74%	5,768,090	47.58%
NDF	44,089	39.85%	292,514	43.01%	6,217,162	51.28%
Other Parties (with < 1%)	1,277	1.15%	8,517	1.25%	138,200	1.14%
Valid Votes	110,636	98.85%	680,084	98.89%	12,123,452	98.85%
Rejected Votes	1,285	1.15%	7,656	1.11%	140,925	1.15%
Total Polled	111,921	79.52%	687,740	82.69%	12,264,377	78.69%
Registered Electors	140,748		831,712		15,585,942	

=== 2010 Sri Lankan Presidential Election ===
Party	Kolonna		Ratnapura Electoral District		Sri Lanka	
Party	Votes	%	Votes	%	Votes	%
UPFA	65,255	66.63%	377,734	63.76%	6,015,934	57.88%
NDF	31,029	31.68%	203,566	34.36%	4,173,185	40.15%
Other Parties (with < 1%)	1,648	1.68%	11,126	1.88%	204,494	1.97%
Valid Votes	97,932	99.28%	592,426	99.26%	10,393,613	99.03%
Rejected Votes	708	0.72%	4,430	0.74%	101,838	0.97%
Total Polled	98,640	77.44%	596,856	79.75%	10,495,451	66.70%
Registered Electors	127,375		748,404		15,734,587	

=== 2005 Sri Lankan Presidential Election ===
Party	Kolonna		Ratnapura Electoral District		Sri Lanka	
Party	Votes	%	Votes	%	Votes	%
UPFA	52,947	57.25%	294,260	53.01%	4,887,152	50.29%
UNP	38,163	41.27%	252,838	45.55%	4,706,366	48.43%
Other Parties (with < 1%)	1,369	1.48%	7,976	1.44%	123,521	1.27%
Valid Votes	92,479	98.97%	555,074	99.02%	9,717,039	98.88%
Rejected Votes	961	1.03%	5,510	0.98%	109,869	1.12%
Total Polled	93,440	80.56%	560,584	82.57%	9,826,908	69.51%
Registered Electors	115,991		678,909		14,136,979	

=== 1999 Sri Lankan Presidential Election ===
Party	Kolonna		Ratnapura Electoral District		Sri Lanka	
Party	Votes	%	Votes	%	Votes	%
PA	39,343	51.39%	250,409	52.13%	4,312,157	51.12%
UNP	29,473	38.50%	202,621	42.18%	3,602,748	42.71%
JVP	5,942	7.76%	16,482	3.43%	343,927	4.08%
Other Parties (with < 1%)	1,801	2.35%	10,852	2.26%	176,679	2.09%
Valid Votes	76,559	97.86%	480,364	98.15%	8,435,754	97.69%
Rejected Votes	1,676	2.14%	9,038	1.85%	199,536	2.31%
Total Polled	78,235	77.90%	489,402	81.27%	8,635,290	72.17%
Registered Electors	100,436		602,172		11,965,536	

=== 1994 Sri Lankan Presidential Election ===
Party	Kolonna		Ratnapura Electoral District		Sri Lanka	
Party	Votes	%	Votes	%	Votes	%
PA	44,641	64.95%	257,265	58.07%	4,709,205	62.28%
UNP	22,425	32.63%	177,924	40.16%	2,715,283	35.91%
Other Parties (with < 1%)	1,665	2.42%	7,842	1.77%	137,040	1.81%
Valid Votes	68,731	98.21%	443,031	98.31%	7,561,526	98.03%
Rejected Votes	1,252	1.79%	7,595	1.69%	151,706	1.97%
Total Polled	69,983	77.84%	450,626	80.02%	7,713,232	69.12%
Registered Electors	89,903		563,174		11,158,880	

=== 1988 Sri Lankan Presidential Election ===
Party	Kolonna		Ratnapura Electoral District		Sri Lanka	
Party	Votes	%	Votes	%	Votes	%
UNP	21,204	50.23%	180,622	51.75%	2,569,199	50.43%
SLFP	20,184	47.81%	159,879	45.81%	2,289,857	44.95%
SLMP	829	1.96%	8,516	2.44%	235,701	4.63%
Valid Votes	42,217	98.56%	349,017	98.84%	5,094,754	98.24%
Rejected Votes	615	1.44%	4,113	1.16%	91,499	1.76%
Total Polled	42,832	58.37%	353,130	76.64%	5,186,256	55.87%
Registered Electors	73,382		460,735		9,283,143	

=== 1982 Sri Lankan Presidential Election ===
Party	Kolonna		Ratnapura Electoral District		Sri Lanka	
Party	Votes	%	Votes	%	Votes	%
UNP	24,459	51.57%	175,903	50.90%	3,450,815	52.93%
SLFP	18,287	38.56%	152,506	44.13%	2,546,348	39.05%
JVP	4,161	8.77%	11,283	3.26%	273,428	4.19%
Other Parties (with < 1%)	520	1.10%	5,912	1.71%	249,460	3.83%
Valid Votes	47,427	98.95%	345,604	99.02%	6,520,156	98.78%
Rejected Votes	505	1.05%	3,407	0.98%	80,470	1.22%
Total Polled	47,932	79.45%	349,011	85.91%	6,600,626	80.15%
Registered Electors	60,326		406,275		8,235,358	

== Parliamentary Election Results ==
=== Summary ===
The winner of Kolonna has matched the final country result 6 out of 7 times. Hence, Kolonna is a Strong Bellwether for Parliamentary Elections.

Year	Kolonna	Ratnapura Electoral District	MAE %	Sri Lanka	MAE %
2015	UPFA	UPFA	5.14%	UNP	8.93%
2010	UPFA	UPFA	1.86%	UPFA	7.25%
2004	UPFA	UPFA	6.37%	UPFA	7.54%
2001	UNP	UNP	4.77%	UNP	2.55%
2000	PA	PA	2.63%	PA	1.54%
1994	PA	PA	7.79%	PA	6.51%
1989	UNP	UNP	1.75%	UNP	5.73%
Matches/Mean MAE	6/7	6/7	4.33%	7/7	5.72%

=== 2015 Sri Lankan Parliamentary Election ===
Party	Kolonna		Ratnapura Electoral District		Sri Lanka	
Party	Votes	%	Votes	%	Votes	%
UPFA	56,515	54.93%	323,636	51.21%	4,732,664	42.48%
UNP	39,090	37.99%	284,117	44.96%	5,098,916	45.77%
JVP	6,762	6.57%	21,525	3.41%	544,154	4.88%
Other Parties (with < 1%)	517	0.50%	2,720	0.43%	83,333	0.75%
Valid Votes	102,884	97.02%	631,998	96.46%	11,140,333	95.35%
Rejected Votes	3,125	2.95%	23,026	3.51%	516,926	4.42%
Total Polled	106,047	75.35%	655,222	80.88%	11,684,111	77.66%
Registered Electors	140,748		810,082		15,044,490	

=== 2010 Sri Lankan Parliamentary Election ===
Party	Kolonna		Ratnapura Electoral District		Sri Lanka	
Party	Votes	%	Votes	%	Votes	%
UPFA	49,778	70.03%	305,327	68.87%	4,846,388	60.38%
UNP	17,511	24.63%	125,076	28.21%	2,357,057	29.37%
DNA	3,455	4.86%	11,053	2.49%	441,251	5.50%
Other Parties (with < 1%)	342	0.48%	1,853	0.42%	35,498	0.44%
Valid Votes	71,086	94.21%	443,309	92.28%	8,026,322	96.03%
Rejected Votes	4,358	5.78%	37,022	7.71%	581,465	6.96%
Total Polled	75,451	59.24%	480,395	64.02%	8,358,246	59.29%
Registered Electors	127,375		750,416		14,097,690	

=== 2004 Sri Lankan Parliamentary Election ===
Party	Kolonna		Ratnapura Electoral District		Sri Lanka	
Party	Votes	%	Votes	%	Votes	%
UPFA	48,051	59.73%	261,450	53.14%	4,223,126	45.70%
UNP	28,117	34.95%	205,490	41.77%	3,486,792	37.73%
JHU	3,749	4.66%	20,801	4.23%	552,723	5.98%
Other Parties (with < 1%)	529	0.66%	4,262	0.87%	58,082	0.63%
Valid Votes	80,446	94.37%	492,003	94.55%	9,241,931	94.52%
Rejected Votes	4,795	5.63%	28,346	5.45%	534,452	5.47%
Total Polled	85,241	76.40%	520,349	80.42%	9,777,821	75.74%
Registered Electors	111,570		647,035		12,909,631	

=== 2001 Sri Lankan Parliamentary Election ===
Party	Kolonna		Ratnapura Electoral District		Sri Lanka	
Party	Votes	%	Votes	%	Votes	%
UNP	33,942	42.57%	227,202	46.41%	4,086,026	45.62%
PA	30,539	38.30%	212,794	43.46%	3,330,815	37.19%
JVP	13,761	17.26%	40,377	8.25%	815,353	9.10%
Other Parties (with < 1%)	1,499	1.88%	9,205	1.88%	131,990	1.47%
Valid Votes	79,741	94.46%	489,578	94.14%	8,955,844	94.77%
Rejected Votes	4,678	5.54%	30,483	5.86%	494,009	5.23%
Total Polled	84,419	79.66%	520,061	83.41%	9,449,878	76.03%
Registered Electors	105,974		623,506		12,428,762	

=== 2000 Sri Lankan Parliamentary Election ===
Party	Kolonna		Ratnapura Electoral District		Sri Lanka	
Party	Votes	%	Votes	%	Votes	%
PA	36,592	46.07%	244,142	50.63%	3,899,329	45.33%
UNP	33,729	42.47%	204,017	42.30%	3,451,765	40.12%
JVP	7,895	9.94%	22,222	4.61%	518,725	6.03%
Other Parties (with < 1%)	1,204	1.52%	11,873	2.46%	239,421	2.78%
Valid Votes	79,420	N/A	482,254	N/A	8,602,617	N/A

=== 1994 Sri Lankan Parliamentary Election ===
Party	Kolonna		Ratnapura Electoral District		Sri Lanka	
Party	Votes	%	Votes	%	Votes	%
PA	41,894	58.41%	233,687	50.77%	3,887,805	48.94%
UNP	28,547	39.80%	220,750	47.96%	3,498,370	44.04%
Other Parties (with < 1%)	1,278	1.78%	5,848	1.27%	223,848	2.82%
Valid Votes	71,719	95.36%	460,285	95.12%	7,943,688	95.20%
Rejected Votes	3,490	4.64%	23,611	4.88%	400,395	4.80%
Total Polled	75,209	83.66%	483,890	85.77%	8,344,095	74.75%
Registered Electors	89,903		564,194		11,163,064	

=== 1989 Sri Lankan Parliamentary Election ===
Party	Kolonna		Ratnapura Electoral District		Sri Lanka	
Party	Votes	%	Votes	%	Votes	%
UNP	22,885	57.17%	196,323	57.89%	2,838,005	50.71%
SLFP	15,843	39.58%	123,360	36.38%	1,785,369	31.90%
USP	757	1.89%	17,323	5.11%	17,323	0.31%
ELJP	416	1.04%	1,337	0.39%	67,723	1.21%
Other Parties (with < 1%)	127	0.32%	779	0.23%	886	0.02%
Valid Votes	40,028	94.45%	339,122	94.37%	5,596,468	93.87%
Rejected Votes	2,350	5.55%	20,248	5.63%	365,563	6.13%
Total Polled	42,378	58.13%	359,370	78.60%	5,962,031	63.60%
Registered Electors	72,897		457,224		9,374,164	

== Demographics ==
=== Ethnicity ===
The Kolonna Polling Division has a Sinhalese majority (97.4%) . In comparison, the Ratnapura Electoral District (which contains the Kolonna Polling Division) has a Sinhalese majority (87.1%)

Ethnicity in Kolonna
1. Sinhalese (97.4%)
2. Indian Tamil (2.10%)
3. Other (0.60%)

=== Religion ===
The Kolonna Polling Division has a Buddhist majority (97.1%) . In comparison, the Ratnapura Electoral District (which contains the Kolonna Polling Division) has a Buddhist majority (86.7%)

Religion in Kolonna
1. Buddhist (97.1%)
2. Hindu (2.30%)
3. Other (0.70%)
