= Nilusha Gamage =

Sri Lankan politician

Nilusha Gamage is a Sri Lankan politician. She was elected to the Sri Lankan Parliament from Ratnapura Electoral District as a member of the National People's Power.
