= Hesha Withanage =

Sri Lankan politician

Hon. Hesha Withanage MP
- හේෂා විතානගේ

Ratnapura District
- Incumbent
- Assumed office 2020

Personal details
- Born: Ankumbura Arachchige Heshan Vijaya Withanage; 28 June 1976 (age 49)
- Party: Samagi Jana Balawegaya

Ankumbura Arachchige Heshan Vijaya Withanage (born 28 June 1976), commonly known as Hesha Withanage, is a Sri Lankan politician and a member of the Sri Lankan parliament from Ratnapura Electoral District as a member of the Samagi Jana Balawegaya.
