= Nivithigala Polling Division =

Nivithigala
- Polling Division
- Interactive map of Nivithigala
- Coordinates: 6.589471°N 80.463780°E
- Country: Sri Lanka
- Province: Sabaragamuwa Province, Sri Lanka
- Electoral District: Ratnapura Electoral District

Area
  - Total: 354.64 km^{2} (136.93 sq mi)

Population (2012)
  - Total: 141,281
  - Density: 398/km^{2} (1,030/sq mi)
- ISO 3166 code: EC-21F

The Nivithigala Polling Division is a Polling Division in the Ratnapura Electoral District, in the Sabaragamuwa Province, Sri Lanka.

== Presidential Election Results ==
=== Summary ===
Nivithigala is known as a bellwether for presidential elections in Sri Lanka, the election results have been mirrored in the overall national results in seven of the past eight elections.

| Year | Nivithigala | Ratnapura Electoral District | MAE % | Sri Lanka | MAE % |
|---|---|---|---|---|---|
| 2019 | SLPP | SLPP | 1.74% | SLPP | 5.10% |
| 2015 | UPFA | UPFA | 2.41% | NDF | 10.57% |
| 2010 | UPFA | UPFA | 1.67% | UPFA | 7.42% |
| 2005 | UPFA | UPFA | 0.24% | UPFA | 2.53% |
| 1999 | PA | PA | 1.56% | PA | 2.32% |
| 1994 | PA | PA | 0.08% | PA | 4.23% |
| 1988 | UNP | UNP | 0.85% | UNP | 1.37% |
| 1982 | UNP | UNP | 1.81% | UNP | 4.84% |
| Matches/Mean MAE | 7/8 | 7/8 | 1.29% | 8/8 | 4.80% |

=== 2019 Sri Lankan Presidential Election ===
| Party | Nivithigala | | Ratnapura Electoral District | | Sri Lanka | |
| Party | Votes | % | Votes | % | Votes | % |
|---|---|---|---|---|---|---|
| SLPP | 50,806 | 58.35% | 448,044 | 59.93% | 6,924,255 | 52.25% |
| NDF | 32,691 | 37.55% | 264,503 | 35.38% | 5,564,239 | 41.99% |
| Other Parties (with < 1%) | 2,230 | 2.56% | 16,237 | 2.17% | 345,452 | 2.61% |
| NMPP | 1,344 | 1.54% | 18,887 | 2.53% | 418,553 | 3.16% |
| Valid Votes | 87,071 | 99.18% | 747,671 | 99.22% | 13,252,499 | 98.99% |
| Rejected Votes | 723 | 0.82% | 5,853 | 0.78% | 135,452 | 1.01% |
| Total Polled | 87,794 | 87.97% | 753,524 | 87.11% | 13,387,951 | 83.71% |
| Registered Electors | 99,796 | | 864,979 | | 15,992,568 | |

=== 2015 Sri Lankan Presidential Election ===
| Party | Nivithigala | | Ratnapura Electoral District | | Sri Lanka | |
| Party | Votes | % | Votes | % | Votes | % |
|---|---|---|---|---|---|---|
| UPFA | 46,275 | 58.01% | 379,053 | 55.74% | 5,768,090 | 47.58% |
| NDF | 32,188 | 40.35% | 292,514 | 43.01% | 6,217,162 | 51.28% |
| Other Parties (with < 1%) | 1,309 | 1.64% | 8,517 | 1.25% | 138,200 | 1.14% |
| Valid Votes | 79,772 | 98.82% | 680,084 | 98.89% | 12,123,452 | 98.85% |
| Rejected Votes | 956 | 1.18% | 7,656 | 1.11% | 140,925 | 1.15% |
| Total Polled | 80,728 | 83.96% | 687,740 | 82.69% | 12,264,377 | 78.69% |
| Registered Electors | 96,156 | | 831,712 | | 15,585,942 | |

=== 2010 Sri Lankan Presidential Election ===
| Party | Nivithigala | | Ratnapura Electoral District | | Sri Lanka | |
| Party | Votes | % | Votes | % | Votes | % |
|---|---|---|---|---|---|---|
| UPFA | 45,248 | 65.30% | 377,734 | 63.76% | 6,015,934 | 57.88% |
| NDF | 22,431 | 32.37% | 203,566 | 34.36% | 4,173,185 | 40.15% |
| Other Parties (with < 1%) | 1,613 | 2.33% | 11,126 | 1.88% | 204,494 | 1.97% |
| Valid Votes | 69,292 | 99.18% | 592,426 | 99.26% | 10,393,613 | 99.03% |
| Rejected Votes | 574 | 0.82% | 4,430 | 0.74% | 101,838 | 0.97% |
| Total Polled | 69,866 | 80.33% | 596,856 | 79.75% | 10,495,451 | 66.70% |
| Registered Electors | 86,973 | | 748,404 | | 15,734,587 | |

=== 2005 Sri Lankan Presidential Election ===
| Party | Nivithigala | | Ratnapura Electoral District | | Sri Lanka | |
| Party | Votes | % | Votes | % | Votes | % |
|---|---|---|---|---|---|---|
| UPFA | 34,569 | 52.71% | 294,260 | 53.01% | 4,887,152 | 50.29% |
| UNP | 29,987 | 45.72% | 252,838 | 45.55% | 4,706,366 | 48.43% |
| Other Parties (with < 1%) | 1,026 | 1.56% | 7,976 | 1.44% | 123,521 | 1.27% |
| Valid Votes | 65,582 | 99.15% | 555,074 | 99.02% | 9,717,039 | 98.88% |
| Rejected Votes | 560 | 0.85% | 5,510 | 0.98% | 109,869 | 1.12% |
| Total Polled | 66,142 | 84.63% | 560,584 | 82.57% | 9,826,908 | 69.51% |
| Registered Electors | 78,157 | | 678,909 | | 14,136,979 | |

=== 1999 Sri Lankan Presidential Election ===
| Party | Nivithigala | | Ratnapura Electoral District | | Sri Lanka | |
| Party | Votes | % | Votes | % | Votes | % |
|---|---|---|---|---|---|---|
| PA | 32,193 | 54.42% | 250,409 | 52.13% | 4,312,157 | 51.12% |
| UNP | 24,516 | 41.45% | 202,621 | 42.18% | 3,602,748 | 42.71% |
| Other Parties (with < 1%) | 1,258 | 2.13% | 10,852 | 2.26% | 176,679 | 2.09% |
| JVP | 1,186 | 2.00% | 16,482 | 3.43% | 343,927 | 4.08% |
| Valid Votes | 59,153 | 98.43% | 480,364 | 98.15% | 8,435,754 | 97.69% |
| Rejected Votes | 941 | 1.57% | 9,038 | 1.85% | 199,536 | 2.31% |
| Total Polled | 60,094 | 85.32% | 489,402 | 81.27% | 8,635,290 | 72.17% |
| Registered Electors | 70,432 | | 602,172 | | 11,965,536 | |

=== 1994 Sri Lankan Presidential Election ===
| Party | Nivithigala | | Ratnapura Electoral District | | Sri Lanka | |
| Party | Votes | % | Votes | % | Votes | % |
|---|---|---|---|---|---|---|
| PA | 31,980 | 57.96% | 257,265 | 58.07% | 4,709,205 | 62.28% |
| UNP | 22,172 | 40.18% | 177,924 | 40.16% | 2,715,283 | 35.91% |
| Other Parties (with < 1%) | 1,026 | 1.86% | 7,842 | 1.77% | 137,040 | 1.81% |
| Valid Votes | 55,178 | 98.51% | 443,031 | 98.31% | 7,561,526 | 98.03% |
| Rejected Votes | 836 | 1.49% | 7,595 | 1.69% | 151,706 | 1.97% |
| Total Polled | 56,014 | 83.74% | 450,626 | 80.02% | 7,713,232 | 69.12% |
| Registered Electors | 66,888 | | 563,174 | | 11,158,880 | |

=== 1988 Sri Lankan Presidential Election ===
| Party | Nivithigala | | Ratnapura Electoral District | | Sri Lanka | |
| Party | Votes | % | Votes | % | Votes | % |
|---|---|---|---|---|---|---|
| UNP | 23,198 | 51.13% | 180,622 | 51.75% | 2,569,199 | 50.43% |
| SLFP | 21,298 | 46.94% | 159,879 | 45.81% | 2,289,857 | 44.95% |
| SLMP | 876 | 1.93% | 8,516 | 2.44% | 235,701 | 4.63% |
| Valid Votes | 45,372 | 98.98% | 349,017 | 98.84% | 5,094,754 | 98.24% |
| Rejected Votes | 467 | 1.02% | 4,113 | 1.16% | 91,499 | 1.76% |
| Total Polled | 45,839 | 84.89% | 353,130 | 76.64% | 5,186,256 | 55.87% |
| Registered Electors | 54,001 | | 460,735 | | 9,283,143 | |

=== 1982 Sri Lankan Presidential Election ===
| Party | Nivithigala | | Ratnapura Electoral District | | Sri Lanka | |
| Party | Votes | % | Votes | % | Votes | % |
|---|---|---|---|---|---|---|
| UNP | 21,556 | 50.17% | 175,903 | 50.90% | 3,450,815 | 52.93% |
| SLFP | 20,308 | 47.27% | 152,506 | 44.13% | 2,546,348 | 39.05% |
| JVP | 779 | 1.81% | 11,283 | 3.26% | 273,428 | 4.19% |
| Other Parties (with < 1%) | 319 | 0.74% | 5,912 | 1.71% | 249,460 | 3.83% |
| Valid Votes | 42,962 | 99.25% | 345,604 | 99.02% | 6,520,156 | 98.78% |
| Rejected Votes | 324 | 0.75% | 3,407 | 0.98% | 80,470 | 1.22% |
| Total Polled | 43,286 | 89.23% | 349,011 | 85.91% | 6,600,626 | 80.15% |
| Registered Electors | 48,510 | | 406,275 | | 8,235,358 | |

== Parliamentary Election Results ==
=== Summary ===
The winner of Nivithigala has matched the final country result 5 out of 7 times. Hence, Nivithigala is a Weak Bellwether for Parliamentary Elections.

| Year | Nivithigala | Ratnapura Electoral District | MAE % | Sri Lanka | MAE % |
|---|---|---|---|---|---|
| 2015 | UPFA | UPFA | 1.45% | UNP | 5.43% |
| 2010 | UPFA | UPFA | 3.05% | UPFA | 8.45% |
| 2004 | UPFA | UPFA | 1.38% | UPFA | 6.29% |
| 2001 | PA | UNP | 3.56% | UNP | 5.28% |
| 2000 | PA | PA | 2.50% | PA | 4.80% |
| 1994 | PA | PA | 1.31% | PA | 2.72% |
| 1989 | UNP | UNP | 1.85% | UNP | 6.16% |
| Matches/Mean MAE | 5/7 | 6/7 | 2.16% | 7/7 | 5.59% |

=== 2015 Sri Lankan Parliamentary Election ===
| Party | Nivithigala | | Ratnapura Electoral District | | Sri Lanka | |
| Party | Votes | % | Votes | % | Votes | % |
|---|---|---|---|---|---|---|
| UPFA | 40,125 | 53.49% | 323,636 | 51.21% | 4,732,664 | 42.48% |
| UNP | 33,353 | 44.46% | 284,117 | 44.96% | 5,098,916 | 45.77% |
| JVP | 1,305 | 1.74% | 21,525 | 3.41% | 544,154 | 4.88% |
| Other Parties (with < 1%) | 229 | 0.31% | 2,720 | 0.43% | 83,333 | 0.75% |
| Valid Votes | 75,012 | 96.31% | 631,998 | 96.46% | 11,140,333 | 95.35% |
| Rejected Votes | 2,851 | 3.66% | 23,026 | 3.51% | 516,926 | 4.42% |
| Total Polled | 77,886 | 81.00% | 655,222 | 80.88% | 11,684,111 | 77.66% |
| Registered Electors | 96,156 | | 810,082 | | 15,044,490 | |

=== 2010 Sri Lankan Parliamentary Election ===
| Party | Nivithigala | | Ratnapura Electoral District | | Sri Lanka | |
| Party | Votes | % | Votes | % | Votes | % |
|---|---|---|---|---|---|---|
| UPFA | 37,930 | 72.32% | 305,327 | 68.87% | 4,846,388 | 60.38% |
| UNP | 13,603 | 25.94% | 125,076 | 28.21% | 2,357,057 | 29.37% |
| DNA | 668 | 1.27% | 11,053 | 2.49% | 441,251 | 5.50% |
| Other Parties (with < 1%) | 245 | 0.47% | 1,853 | 0.42% | 35,498 | 0.44% |
| Valid Votes | 52,446 | 91.99% | 443,309 | 92.28% | 8,026,322 | 96.03% |
| Rejected Votes | 4,559 | 8.00% | 37,022 | 7.71% | 581,465 | 6.96% |
| Total Polled | 57,014 | 65.55% | 480,395 | 64.02% | 8,358,246 | 59.29% |
| Registered Electors | 86,973 | | 750,416 | | 14,097,690 | |

=== 2004 Sri Lankan Parliamentary Election ===
| Party | Nivithigala | | Ratnapura Electoral District | | Sri Lanka | |
| Party | Votes | % | Votes | % | Votes | % |
|---|---|---|---|---|---|---|
| UPFA | 32,331 | 54.70% | 261,450 | 53.14% | 4,223,126 | 45.70% |
| UNP | 25,321 | 42.84% | 205,490 | 41.77% | 3,486,792 | 37.73% |
| JHU | 1,076 | 1.82% | 20,801 | 4.23% | 552,723 | 5.98% |
| Other Parties (with < 1%) | 378 | 0.64% | 4,262 | 0.87% | 58,082 | 0.63% |
| Valid Votes | 59,106 | 94.96% | 492,003 | 94.55% | 9,241,931 | 94.52% |
| Rejected Votes | 3,134 | 5.04% | 28,346 | 5.45% | 534,452 | 5.47% |
| Total Polled | 62,240 | 81.99% | 520,349 | 80.42% | 9,777,821 | 75.74% |
| Registered Electors | 75,915 | | 647,035 | | 12,909,631 | |

=== 2001 Sri Lankan Parliamentary Election ===
| Party | Nivithigala | | Ratnapura Electoral District | | Sri Lanka | |
| Party | Votes | % | Votes | % | Votes | % |
|---|---|---|---|---|---|---|
| PA | 28,833 | 49.01% | 212,794 | 43.46% | 3,330,815 | 37.19% |
| UNP | 26,220 | 44.57% | 227,202 | 46.41% | 4,086,026 | 45.62% |
| JVP | 2,756 | 4.68% | 40,377 | 8.25% | 815,353 | 9.10% |
| Other Parties (with < 1%) | 1,020 | 1.73% | 9,205 | 1.88% | 131,990 | 1.47% |
| Valid Votes | 58,829 | 94.84% | 489,578 | 94.14% | 8,955,844 | 94.77% |
| Rejected Votes | 3,203 | 5.16% | 30,483 | 5.86% | 494,009 | 5.23% |
| Total Polled | 62,032 | 84.77% | 520,061 | 83.41% | 9,449,878 | 76.03% |
| Registered Electors | 73,176 | | 623,506 | | 12,428,762 | |

=== 2000 Sri Lankan Parliamentary Election ===
| Party | Nivithigala | | Ratnapura Electoral District | | Sri Lanka | |
| Party | Votes | % | Votes | % | Votes | % |
|---|---|---|---|---|---|---|
| PA | 31,798 | 54.47% | 244,142 | 50.63% | 3,899,329 | 45.33% |
| UNP | 24,062 | 41.22% | 204,017 | 42.30% | 3,451,765 | 40.12% |
| JVP | 1,631 | 2.79% | 22,222 | 4.61% | 518,725 | 6.03% |
| Other Parties (with < 1%) | 886 | 1.52% | 11,873 | 2.46% | 239,421 | 2.78% |
| Valid Votes | 58,377 | N/A | 482,254 | N/A | 8,602,617 | N/A |

=== 1994 Sri Lankan Parliamentary Election ===
| Party | Nivithigala | | Ratnapura Electoral District | | Sri Lanka | |
| Party | Votes | % | Votes | % | Votes | % |
|---|---|---|---|---|---|---|
| PA | 27,908 | 49.60% | 233,687 | 50.77% | 3,887,805 | 48.94% |
| UNP | 27,819 | 49.44% | 220,750 | 47.96% | 3,498,370 | 44.04% |
| Other Parties (with < 1%) | 542 | 0.96% | 5,848 | 1.27% | 223,848 | 2.82% |
| Valid Votes | 56,269 | 95.24% | 460,285 | 95.12% | 7,943,688 | 95.20% |
| Rejected Votes | 2,812 | 4.76% | 23,611 | 4.88% | 400,395 | 4.80% |
| Total Polled | 59,081 | 88.33% | 483,890 | 85.77% | 8,344,095 | 74.75% |
| Registered Electors | 66,888 | | 564,194 | | 11,163,064 | |

=== 1989 Sri Lankan Parliamentary Election ===
| Party | Nivithigala | | Ratnapura Electoral District | | Sri Lanka | |
| Party | Votes | % | Votes | % | Votes | % |
|---|---|---|---|---|---|---|
| UNP | 24,875 | 57.50% | 196,323 | 57.89% | 2,838,005 | 50.71% |
| SLFP | 17,457 | 40.35% | 123,360 | 36.38% | 1,785,369 | 31.90% |
| USP | 732 | 1.69% | 17,323 | 5.11% | 17,323 | 0.31% |
| Other Parties (with < 1%) | 195 | 0.45% | 2,116 | 0.62% | 68,609 | 1.23% |
| Valid Votes | 43,259 | 95.00% | 339,122 | 94.37% | 5,596,468 | 93.87% |
| Rejected Votes | 2,277 | 5.00% | 20,248 | 5.63% | 365,563 | 6.13% |
| Total Polled | 45,536 | 85.24% | 359,370 | 78.60% | 5,962,031 | 63.60% |
| Registered Electors | 53,422 | | 457,224 | | 9,374,164 | |

== Demographics ==
=== Ethnicity ===
The Nivithigala Polling Division has a Sinhalese majority (83.5%) . In comparison, the Ratnapura Electoral District (which contains the Nivithigala Polling Division) has a Sinhalese majority (87.1%)

Ethnicity in Nivithigala
1. Sinhalese (83.5%)
2. Indian Tamil (8.30%)
3. Sri Lankan Tamil (6.80%)
4. Moor (1.30%)
5. Other (0.10%)

=== Religion ===
The Nivithigala Polling Division has a Buddhist majority (83.4%) and a significant Hindu population (13.3%) . In comparison, the Ratnapura Electoral District (which contains the Nivithigala Polling Division) has a Buddhist majority (86.7%)

Religion in Nivithigala
1. Buddhist (83.4%)
2. Hindu (13.3%)
3. Muslim (1.50%)
4. Roman Catholic (1.10%)
5. Other (0.60%)
