= Dunesh Gankanda =

Sri Lankan politician

Hon. Dunesh Gankanda MP

Member of Parliament for Ratnapura District
- Incumbent
- Assumed office 2004

Personal details
- Born: March 16, 1972 (age 54)
- Party: United National Party
- Other political affiliations: United National Front

Dunesh Harsha Gankanda is a Sri Lankan politician and a member of the Parliament of Sri Lanka (born 16 March 1972).
