= Ratnapura Electoral District =

Electoral district in Sri Lanka

Ratnapura
- Electoral District for the Parliament of Sri Lanka
- Administrative District: Ratnapura
- Province: Sabaragamuwa
- Polling divisions: 8
- Population: 1,099,000 (2008)
- Electorate: 734,651 (2010)
- Area: 3,275 km^{2} (1,264 sq mi)

Current Electoral District
- Number of members: 11
- MPs: NPP (8) Shantha Padmakumara; S. Pradeep; Hiniduma Sunil Senevi; Janaka Senarathna; Sunil Rajapaksha; Upul Kithsiri; Wasantha Pushpakumara; Nilusha Gamage SJB (3) Hesha Withanage; Waruna Priyantha Liyanage; Basooriyage Ariyawansa

Ratnapura electoral district is one of the 22 multi-member electoral districts of Sri Lanka created by the 1978 Constitution of Sri Lanka. The district is conterminous with the administrative district of Ratnapura in the Sabaragamuwa province. The district currently elects 10 of the 225 members of the Sri Lankan Parliament and had 734,651 registered electors in 2010. The district is Sri Lanka's Electorate Number 21.

== Polling Divisions ==
The Ratnapura Electoral District consists of the following polling divisions:

A: Eheliyagoda

B: Ratnapura

C: Pelmadulla

D: Balangoda

E: Rakwana

F: Nivithigala

G: Kalawana

H: Kolonna

== 1982 Presidential Election ==
Results of the 1st presidential election held on 20 October 1982 for the district:

Candidate	Party	Votes per Polling Division								Postal Votes	Total Votes	%
Candidate	Party	Balan -goda	Eheli- yagoda	Kala- wana	Kolonna	Niviti -gala	Pelma- dulla	Rak- wana	Ratna -pura	Postal Votes	Total Votes	%
Junius Jayewardene	UNP	22,923	23,721	13,806	24,459	21,556	17,212	24,986	24,765	2,475	175,903	50.90%
Hector Kobbekaduwa	SLFP	20,679	19,742	13,644	18,287	20,308	15,106	17,936	25,402	1,402	152,506	44.13%
Rohana Wijeweera	JVP	1,440	851	629	4,161	779	1,126	1,339	860	98	11,283	3.26%
Vasudeva Nanayakkara	NSSP	53	2,987	52	83	62	61	57	102	37	3,494	1.01%
Colvin R. de Silva	LSSP	195	272	129	378	205	214	291	273	39	1,996	0.58%
Kumar Ponnambalam	ACTC	76	54	33	59	52	35	62	51	0	422	0.12%
Valid Votes		45,366	47,627	28,293	47,427	42,962	33,754	44,671	51,453	4,051	345,604	100.00%
Rejected Votes		336	855	237	505	324	340	289	499	22	3,407	
Total Polled		45,702	48,482	28,530	47,932	43,286	34,094	44,960	51,952	4,073	349,011	
Registered Electors		51,837	56,592	32,904	60,326	48,510	38,662	51,385	61,986		402,202	
Turnout		88.16%	85.67%	86.71%	79.45%	89.23%	88.18%	87.50%	83.81%		86.78%	

== 1988 Presidential Election ==
Results of the 2nd presidential election held on 19 December 1988 for the district:

Candidate	Party	Votes per Polling Division								Postal Votes	Total Votes	%
Candidate	Party	Balan -goda	Eheli- yagoda	Kala- wana	Kolonna	Niviti -gala	Pelma- dulla	Rak- wana	Ratna -pura	Postal Votes	Total Votes	%
Ranasinghe Premadasa	UNP	24,802	24,281	14,316	21,204	23,198	18,370	26,643	26,029	1,779	180,622	51.75%
Sirimavo Bandaranaike	SLFP	22,074	18,647	12,994	20,184	21,298	16,719	18,744	27,658	1,561	159,879	45.81%
Oswin Abeygunasekara	SLMP	771	2,037	1,180	829	876	651	608	1,460	104	8,516	2.44%
Valid Votes		47,647	44,965	28,490	42,217	45,372	35,740	45,995	55,147	3,444	349,017	100.00%
Rejected Votes		516	533	369	615	467	400	538	608	67	4,113	
Total Polled		48,163	45,498	28,859	42,832	45,839	36,140	46,533	55,755	3,511	353,130	
Registered Electors		59,661	61,203	36,544	73,382	54,001	43,820	58,565	70,048		457,224	
Turnout		80.73%	74.34%	78.97%	58.37%	84.89%	82.47%	79.46%	79.60%		77.23%	

== 1989 Parliamentary General Election ==
Results of the 9th parliamentary election held on 15 February 1989 for the district:

Party	Votes per Polling Division								Postal Votes	Total Votes	%	Seats
Party	Balan -goda	Eheli- yagoda	Kala- wana	Kolonna	Niviti -gala	Pelma- dulla	Rak- wana	Ratna -pura	Postal Votes	Total Votes	%	Seats
United National Party / Ceylon Workers' Congress	27,987	26,165	16,118	22,885	24,875	19,493	29,204	26,289	3,307	196,323	57.89%	6
Sri Lanka Freedom Party	16,662	8,628	9,494	15,843	17,457	13,752	14,610	25,112	1,802	123,360	36.38%	3
United Socialist Alliance (CPSL, LSSP, NSSP, SLMP)	931	10,285	1,909	757	732	678	428	1,359	244	17,323	5.11%	1
United Lanka People's Party	130	235	90	416	98	104	133	117	14	1,337	0.39%	0
Independent	122	92	55	127	97	71	109	102	4	779	0.23%	0
Valid Votes	45,832	45,405	27,666	40,028	43,259	34,098	44,484	52,979	5,371	339,122	100.00%	10
Rejected Votes	3,201	2,919	1,680	2,350	2,277	2,033	2,849	2,847	92	20,248		
Total Polled	49,033	48,324	29,346	42,378	45,536	36,131	47,333	55,826	5,463	359,370		
Registered Electors	58,861	60,466	36,117	72,897	53,422	43,236	57,842	68,694	5,689	457,224		
Turnout	83.30%	79.92%	81.25%	58.13%	85.24%	83.57%	81.83%	81.27%	96.03%	78.60%		

The following candidates were elected: Nanda Sydney Ellawala (SLFP), 75,645 preference votes (pv); Gamini Atukorale (UNP), 53,420 pv; Wimal Wickramasinghe (UNP), 45,680 pv; Kaluwa Devagey Nanda Mathew (UNP), 43,307 pv; Athula Kularatne Attygale (UNP), 39,809 pv; Chandrasekara Gankande (UNP), 37,875 pv; M.L.M. Aboosally (UNP), 32,133 pv; W. D. J. Senewiratne (SLFP), 29,651 pv; Udagama Liyanage Heenmahatmaya (SLFP), 28,142 pv; and Vasudeva Nanayakkara (USA), 13,013 pv.

== 1994 Parliamentary General Election ==
Results of the 10th parliamentary election held on 16 August 1994 for the district:

Party	Votes per Polling Division								Postal Votes	Total Votes	%	Seats
Party	Balan -goda	Eheli- yagoda	Kala- wana	Kolonna	Niviti -gala	Pelma- dulla	Rak- wana	Ratna -pura	Postal Votes	Total Votes	%	Seats
People's Alliance (SLFP et al.)	28,292	30,714	18,312	41,894	27,908	21,302	25,324	35,045	4,896	233,687	50.77%	6
United National Party / Ceylon Workers' Congress	29,959	25,070	17,674	28,547	27,819	25,008	31,183	31,619	3,871	220,750	47.96%	4
Sri Lanka Progressive Front (JVP)	373	229	75	654	140	232	237	303	87	2,330	0.51%	0
Mahajana Eksath Peramuna	133	538	55	239	128	121	101	243	76	1,634	0.35%	0
Independent 1	204	150	116	324	222	164	171	204	0	1,555	0.34%	0
Independent 3	22	29	16	35	35	19	17	29	0	202	0.04%	0
Independent 2	14	13	11	26	17	15	15	15	1	127	0.03%	0
Valid Votes	58,997	56,743	36,259	71,719	56,269	46,861	57,048	67,458	8,931	460,285	100.00%	10
Rejected Votes	3,870	2,797	1,716	3,490	2,812	2,541	3,009	3,291	85	23,611		
Total Polled	62,867	59,540	37,975	75,209	59,081	49,402	60,057	70,749	9,016	483,896		
Registered Electors	73,136	71,614	43,279	89,903	66,888	56,593	69,702	83,492		554,607		
Turnout	85.96%	83.14%	87.74%	83.66%	88.33%	87.29%	86.16%	84.74%		87.25%		

The following candidates were elected: Gamini Atukorale (UNP), 82,869 preference votes (pv); Vasudeva Nanayakkara (PA), 62,989 pv; Pavithra Devi Wanniarachchi (PA), 62,979 pv; Susantha Punchinilame (UNP), 57,029 pv; Nalanda Ellawala (PA), 52,371 pv; Upatissa Silva Hiripitiyage Maithripala (UNP), 49,481 pv; Jayatissa Ranaweera (PA), 48,450 pv; Kaluwa Devagey Nanda Mathew (UNP), 47,176 pv; Udagama Liyanage Heenmahatmaya (PA), 47,122 pv; and W. D. J. Senewiratne (PA), 44,704 pv.

Nalanda Ellawala (PA) was murdered on 11 February 1997.

== 1994 Presidential Election ==
Results of the 3rd presidential election held on 9 November 1994 for the district:

Candidate	Party	Votes per Polling Division								Postal Votes	Total Votes	%
Candidate	Party	Balan -goda	Eheli- yagoda	Kala- wana	Kolonna	Niviti -gala	Pelma- dulla	Rak- wana	Ratna -pura	Postal Votes	Total Votes	%
Chandrika Kumaratunga	PA	32,501	32,647	19,993	44,641	31,980	24,076	27,997	38,221	5,209	257,265	58.07%
Srimathi Dissanayake	UNP	23,943	20,589	14,434	22,425	22,172	19,994	25,338	25,858	3,171	177,924	40.16%
Hudson Samarasinghe	Ind 2	353	366	234	666	531	405	453	435	8	3,451	0.78%
Harischandra Wijayatunga	SMBP	257	166	93	465	202	172	253	225	44	1,877	0.42%
Nihal Galappaththi	SLPF	195	104	82	312	152	118	154	141	21	1,279	0.29%
A.J. Ranashinge	Ind 1	154	125	87	222	141	138	189	162	17	1,235	0.28%
Valid Votes		57,403	53,997	34,923	68,731	55,178	44,903	54,384	65,042	8,470	443,031	100.00%
Rejected Votes		1,277	705	469	1,252	836	906	1,057	996	97	7,595	
Total Polled		58,680	54,702	35,392	69,983	56,014	45,809	55,441	66,038	8,567	450,626	
Registered Electors		73,136	71,614	43,279	89,903	66,888	56,593	69,702	83,492		554,607	
Turnout		80.23%	76.38%	81.78%	77.84%	83.74%	80.94%	79.54%	79.10%		81.25%	

== 1999 Provincial Council Election ==
Results of the 3rd Sabaragamuwa provincial council election held on 6 April 1999 for the district:

Party	Votes	%	Seats
People's Alliance (SLFP, SLMC et al.)	191,502	47.92%	
United National Party	175,912	44.02%	
Janatha Vimukthi Peramuna	17,200	4.30%	
National Union of Workers (CWC, DWC)	7,586	1.90%	
New Left Front (NSSP et al.)	5,047	1.26%	
Mahajana Eksath Peramuna	1,624	0.41%	
Independent	592	0.15%	
Sri Lanka Progressive Front	194	0.05%	
Valid Votes	399,657	100.00%	
Rejected Votes	29,362		
Total Polled	429,019		
Registered Electors	584,998		
Turnout	73.34%		

== 1999 Presidential Election ==
Results of the 4th presidential election held on 21 December 1999 for the district:

Candidate	Party	Votes per Polling Division								Postal Votes	Total Votes	%
Candidate	Party	Balan -goda	Eheli- yagoda	Kala- wana	Kolonna	Niviti -gala	Pelma- dulla	Rak- wana	Ratna -pura	Postal Votes	Total Votes	%
Chandrika Kumaratunga	PA	31,231	31,228	21,261	39,343	32,193	24,995	28,305	38,665	3,188	250,409	52.13%
Ranil Wickremasinghe	UNP	28,184	23,868	15,428	29,473	24,516	21,293	28,059	29,298	2,502	202,621	42.18%
Nandana Gunathilake	JVP	1,810	1,502	963	5,942	1,186	1,195	1,552	1,914	418	16,482	3.43%
Vasudeva Nanayakkara	LDA	152	949	93	220	123	112	97	202	59	2,007	0.42%
W.V.M. Ranjith	Ind 2	238	180	137	344	251	159	257	245	0	1,811	0.38%
Rajiva Wijesinha	Liberal	244	155	131	331	202	191	253	176	4	1,687	0.35%
T. Edirisuriya	Ind 1	189	121	135	305	206	170	188	156	5	1,475	0.31%
Harischandra Wijayatunga	SMBP	217	136	84	195	145	172	165	230	48	1,392	0.29%
Abdul Rasool	SLMP	100	115	48	101	100	76	101	115	1	757	0.16%
Kamal Karunadasa	PLSF	108	62	49	133	83	76	105	106	5	727	0.15%
Hudson Samarasinghe	Ind 3	68	60	43	75	84	44	71	45	0	490	0.10%
A.W. Premawardhana	PFF	44	27	19	45	33	27	32	31	1	259	0.05%
A. Dissanayaka	DUNF	43	26	15	52	31	20	24	32	4	247	0.05%
Valid Votes		62,628	58,429	38,406	76,559	59,153	48,530	59,209	71,215	6,235	480,364	100.00%
Rejected Votes		1,232	1,236	544	1,676	941	941	1,055	1,267	146	9,038	
Total Polled		63,860	59,665	38,950	78,235	60,094	49,471	60,264	72,482	6,381	489,402	
Registered Electors		78,239	76,327	46,426	100,436	70,432	58,977	75,436	89,518		595,791	
Turnout		81.62%	78.17%	83.90%	77.90%	85.32%	83.88%	79.89%	80.97%		82.14%	

== 2000 Parliamentary General Election ==
Results of the 11th parliamentary election held on 10 October 2000 for the district:

Party	Votes per Polling Division								Postal Votes	Total Votes	%	Seats
Party	Balan -goda	Eheli- yagoda	Kala- wana	Kolonna	Niviti -gala	Pelma- dulla	Rak- wana	Ratna -pura	Postal Votes	Total Votes	%	Seats
People's Alliance (SLFP et al.)	31,411	27,885	21,224	36,592	31,798	25,563	28,497	36,981	4,191	244,142	50.63%	6
United National Party	25,789	23,985	15,246	33,729	24,062	20,385	27,685	30,189	2,947	204,017	42.30%	4
Janatha Vimukthi Peramuna	2,232	1,907	1,237	7,895	1,631	1,556	1,937	3,165	662	22,222	4.61%	0
Left & Democratic Alliance	215	4,272	178	322	277	181	125	456	132	6,158	1.28%	0
Sinhala Heritage	148	285	99	174	124	179	124	493	77	1,703	0.35%	0
United Lalith Front	87	103	65	162	118	110	105	130	2	882	0.18%	0
Citizen's Front	185	96	35	114	69	37	73	94	13	716	0.15%	0
Liberal Party	73	89	48	103	71	51	69	71	4	579	0.12%	0
Democratic United National Front	60	52	31	54	47	39	58	53	1	395	0.08%	0
Independent 4	42	41	17	38	45	32	33	28	0	276	0.06%	0
Sinhalaye Mahasammatha Bhoomiputra Pakshaya	33	31	16	32	26	28	28	45	9	248	0.05%	0
United Sinhala Great Council	29	10	10	72	27	25	38	26	0	237	0.05%	0
People's Liberation Solidarity Front	21	28	12	36	14	9	25	25	6	176	0.04%	0
Independent 3	12	19	8	26	14	11	13	13	0	116	0.02%	0
People's Freedom Front	7	18	11	16	13	9	13	8	0	95	0.02%	0
Sri Lanka Progressive Front	7	11	7	15	23	10	10	10	2	95	0.02%	0
Independent 2	13	19	5	21	8	9	9	7	2	93	0.02%	0
Independent 1	13	5	0	7	8	2	7	12	0	54	0.01%	0
National Development Front	7	3	4	12	2	5	5	11	1	50	0.01%	0
Valid Votes	60,384	58,859	38,253	79,420	58,377	48,241	58,854	71,817	8,049	482,254	100.00%	10
Rejected Votes	4,071	3,226	2,230	3,772	2,802	2,937	3,984	3,591	206	26,819		
Total Polled	64,455	62,085	40,483	83,192	61,179	51,178	62,838	75,408	8,255	509,073		
Registered Electors	80,091	77,695	47,608	102,876	71,885	60,350	77,040	92,110		609,655		
Turnout	80.48%	79.91%	85.03%	80.87%	85.11%	84.80%	81.57%	81.87%		83.50%		

The following candidates were elected: Gamini Atukorale (UNP), 109,102 preference votes (pv); Pavithra Devi Wanniarachchi (PA), 108,324 pv; W. D. J. Senewiratne (PA), 86,744 pv; Susantha Punchinilame (UNP), 77,197 pv; Surangani Ellawala (PA), 54,517; Mahinda Ratnatilaka (UNP), 49,808 pv; Abeynayaka Piyadasa (UNP), 41,365 pv; Arachchige Dharmadasa Wanniarachchi (PA), 39,972 pv; Udagama Liyanage Heenmahatmaya (PA), 39,285 pv; and Jayatissa Ranaweera (PA), 38,631 pv.

== 2001 Parliamentary General Election ==
Results of the 12th parliamentary election held on 5 December 2001 for the district:

Party	Votes per Polling Division								Postal Votes	Total Votes	%	Seats
Party	Balan -goda	Eheli- yagoda	Kala- wana	Kolonna	Niviti -gala	Pelma- dulla	Rak- wana	Ratna -pura	Postal Votes	Total Votes	%	Seats
United National Front (UNP, SLMC, CWC, WPF)	30,982	27,594	16,708	33,942	26,220	24,135	30,637	33,702		227,202	46.41%	5
People's Alliance (SLFP et al.)	25,849	26,773	18,445	30,539	28,833	21,329	24,316	33,136		212,794	43.46%	4
Janatha Vimukthi Peramuna	4,106	4,448	2,506	13,761	2,756	2,591	3,693	5,334		40,377	8.25%	1
New Left Front (NSSP et al.)	604	530	416	713	554	492	543	730		4,589	0.94%	0
United Socialist Party	206	246	126	255	186	154	167	209		1,556	0.32%	0
Sinhala Heritage	222	259	66	177	90	126	107	352		1,448	0.30%	0
Independent 5	31	30	17	82	29	15	34	31		270	0.06%	0
Liberal Party	32	41	25	48	38	17	21	37		259	0.05%	0
United Sinhala Great Council	30	20	13	67	33	21	34	22		242	0.05%	0
People's Freedom Front	33	19	17	39	30	23	25	44		231	0.05%	0
Independent 4	27	21	19	31	16	11	17	31		173	0.04%	0
Independent 2	15	32	15	32	16	11	17	29		167	0.03%	0
Independent 1	17	13	7	21	8	6	12	16		100	0.02%	0
Sri Lanka National Front	4	8	10	13	11	2	3	6		58	0.01%	0
Sri Lanka Progressive Front	6	5	7	9	6	5	7	11		57	0.01%	0
Independent 3	10	7	2	12	3	2	10	7		55	0.01%	0
Valid Votes	62,174	60,046	38,399	79,741	58,829	48,940	59,643	73,697		489,578	100.00%	10
Rejected Votes	4,793	3,294	2,830	4,678	3,203	3,300	4,589	3,657		30,483		
Total Polled	66,967	63,340	41,229	84,419	62,032	52,240	64,232	77,354		520,061		
Registered Electors	81,992	79,242	48,682	105,974	73,176	61,586	78,583	94,271		623,506		
Turnout	81.68%	79.93%	84.69%	79.66%	84.77%	84.82%	81.74%	82.05%		83.41%		

The following candidates were elected: Gamini Atukorale (UNF), 140,054 preference votes (pv); Susantha Punchinilame (UNF), 101,033 pv; Pavithra Devi Wanniarachchi (PA), 84,173 pv; Premalal Jayasekara (PA), 79,742 pv; W. D. J. Senewiratne (PA), 64,693 pv; Mahinda Ratnatilaka (UNF), 58,265 pv; A. A. Wijethunga (UNF), 43,081 pv; Abeynayaka Piyadasa (UNF), 38,655 pv; Ashoka Jayawardhane (PA), 37,442 pv; and Achala Jagodage (JVP), 2,617 pv.

== 2004 Parliamentary General Election ==
Results of the 13th parliamentary election held on 2 April 2004 for the district:

Party	Votes per Polling Division								Postal Votes	Total Votes	%	Seats
Party	Balan -goda	Eheli- yagoda	Kala- wana	Kolonna	Niviti -gala	Pelma- dulla	Rak- wana	Ratna -pura	Postal Votes	Total Votes	%	Seats
United People's Freedom Alliance (SLFP, JVP et al.)	32,042	31,341	22,501	48,051	32,331	23,403	29,509	37,386	4,886	261,450	53.14%	6
United National Front (UNP, SLMC, CWC, WPF)	27,685	24,934	15,726	28,117	25,321	22,745	28,453	29,670	2,839	205,490	41.77%	4
Jathika Hela Urumaya	2,364	3,142	660	3,749	1,076	1,979	1,644	5,605	582	20,801	4.23%	0
New Left Front (NSSP et al.)	53	944	26	79	65	50	26	79	14	1,336	0.27%	0
United Lalith Front	81	94	64	104	95	83	95	120	2	738	0.15%	0
United Socialist Party	87	104	43	84	89	100	74	67	1	649	0.13%	0
National Development Front	87	74	28	111	41	52	46	144	2	585	0.12%	0
Independent 7	51	48	20	42	25	39	41	41	0	307	0.06%	0
Independent 6	30	28	14	31	22	21	23	30	0	199	0.04%	0
Independent 5	23	18	9	15	10	9	15	13	0	112	0.02%	0
Sinhalaye Mahasammatha Bhoomiputra Pakshaya	6	7	5	10	2	3	9	8	1	51	0.01%	0
Swarajya	4	1	3	6	7	4	2	20	2	49	0.01%	0
Independent 3	4	5	5	14	2	5	5	2	1	43	0.01%	0
Independent 2	4	3	0	2	7	6	9	10	0	41	0.01%	0
Independent 1	5	4	3	8	11	1	4	4	0	40	0.01%	0
Ruhuna People's Party	5	5	4	3	0	4	7	4	0	32	0.01%	0
Sri Lanka Progressive Front	1	4	5	8	2	4	2	4	1	31	0.01%	0
Sri Lanka National Front	3	6	1	6	0	4	4	3	0	27	0.01%	0
Independent 4	4	2	3	6	0	1	3	3	0	22	0.00%	0
Valid Votes	62,539	60,764	39,120	80,446	59,106	48,513	59,971	73,213	8,331	492,003	100.00%	10
Rejected Votes	4,340	3,220	2,322	4,795	3,134	3,069	3,408	3,926	132	28,346		
Total Polled	66,879	63,984	41,442	85,241	62,240	51,582	63,379	77,139	8,463	520,349		
Registered Electors	85,285	81,652	50,558	111,570	75,915	63,305	81,393	97,357		647,035		
Turnout	78.42%	78.36%	81.97%	76.40%	81.99%	81.48%	77.87%	79.23%		80.42%		

The following candidates were elected: Pavithra Devi Wanniarachchi (UPFA-SLFP), 125,592 preference votes (pv); Thalatha Atukorale (UNF-UNP), 113,617 pv; Achala Jagodage (UPFA-JVP), 97,083 pv; Susantha Punchinilame (UNF-UNP), 96,591 pv; W. D. J. Senewiratne (UPFA-SLFP), 84,284 pv; Deepal Gunasekara (UPFA-JVP), 76,883 pv; Premalal Jayasekara (UPFA-SLFP), 71,982 pv; Dunesh Gankanda (UNF-UNP), 42,738 pv; Jayatissa Ranaweera (UPFA-SLFP), 40,382 pv; and Mahinda Ratnatilaka (UNF-UNP), 36,289 pv.

== 2004 Provincial Council Election ==
Results of the 4th Sabaragamuwa provincial council election held on 10 July 2004 for the district:

Party	Votes per Polling Division								Postal Votes	Total Votes	%	Seats
Party	Balan -goda	Eheli- yagoda	Kala- wana	Kolonna	Niviti -gala	Pelma- dulla	Rak- wana	Ratna -pura	Postal Votes	Total Votes	%	Seats
United People's Freedom Alliance (SLFP, JVP et al.)	27,132	23,151	18,195	40,331	25,462	19,199	26,751	30,586	2,812	213,619	61.07%	15
United National Party	12,513	16,581	9,809	17,877	13,724	13,199	16,217	18,430	1,331	119,681	34.22%	8
Ceylon Workers' Congress	1,191	440	360	217	820	1,449	1,156	785	7	6,425	1.84%	1
Sri Lanka Muslim Congress	937	904	9	10	308	152	686	720	5	3,731	1.07%	0
Up-Country People's Front	1,068	50	9	28	80	293	130	146	2	1,806	0.52%	0
United Socialist Party	77	365	59	78	274	165	124	114	5	1,261	0.36%	0
Democratic People's Front	36	103	43	37	172	154	159	149	1	854	0.24%	0
United Lalith Front	89	64	51	78	97	95	97	134	2	707	0.20%	0
National Development Front	68	47	48	115	48	40	66	80	0	512	0.15%	0
Independent 4	28	38	29	52	31	21	28	46	2	275	0.08%	0
Liberal Party	8	181	2	9	7	6	7	38	4	262	0.07%	0
Sri Lanka Muslim Party	42	51	4	7	10	6	6	7	0	133	0.04%	0
United Sinhala Great Council	13	6	4	16	14	9	13	18	3	96	0.03%	0
Democratic United National Front	12	10	14	5	13	14	10	5	0	83	0.02%	0
Independent 2	12	7	8	14	8	13	10	6	0	78	0.02%	0
Independent 1	8	15	2	9	9	4	5	17	5	74	0.02%	0
Independent 3	10	12	5	13	11	8	4	9	1	73	0.02%	0
National People's Party	9	6	1	11	11	6	7	11	0	62	0.02%	0
Sri Lanka Progressive Front	8	12	6	7	3	3	8	5	0	52	0.01%	0
Valid Votes	43,261	42,043	28,658	58,914	41,102	34,836	45,484	51,306	4,180	349,784	100.00%	24
Rejected Votes	3,023	2,370	1,756	3,951	2,772	2,488	2,790	3,276	226	22,652		
Total Polled	46,284	44,413	30,414	62,865	43,874	37,324	48,274	54,582	4,406	372,436		
Registered Electors	85,285	81,652	50,558	111,570	75,915	63,305	81,393	97,357		647,035		
Turnout	54.27%	54.39%	60.16%	56.35%	57.79%	58.96%	59.31%	56.06%		57.56%		

The following candidates were elected: Ariyadasa Gamaethige (UPFA), 33,621 preference votes (pv); Thirimadura Ranjith de Soysa (UPFA), 32,182 pv; Ellawala Mohan Saliya (UPFA), 31,182 pv; Ambagahaarawe Prabhath Bhanu Munipriya (UPFA), 28,548 pv; Janaka Wakkumbura (UPFA), 27,998 pv; A. A. Wijethunga (UNP), 25,002 pv; Mahawatta Kodithuwakkuge Sanee Rohana (UPFA), 24,392 pv; Beligaswatta Akkarak Kuruppu Mudiyanselage Ranjith Bandara (UPFA), 22,779 pv; Athula Kumara Rahubadda (UPFA), 22,531 pv; Arachchi Muthukuda Pushpa Kumara Disanayake (UPFA), 22,257 pv; Athukorala Kodithuwakkuge Sarath Kumara (UPFA), 22,215 pv; Siripala Kiriella (UNP), 20,609 pv; Arachchige Malawala Dharmasiri (UPFA), 20,536 pv; Atigala Samitha (UNP), 18,921 pv; Gonagala Manannalage Karunapala (UPFA), 17,758 pv; Elapatha Withanage Saman Priyanjith Witharana (UPFA), 17,292 pv; Wanni Arachchige Heenmahathmaya (UPFA), 16,614 pv; Panawalage Nimal Padmasiri Wijenayake (UNP), 16,223 pv; Anura de Silva Kumara Siri Alagiyawanna (UPFA), 16,128 pv; Abenayaka Piyadasa (UNP), 16,094 pv; Al Iflar Mahamad Yehiya Mahamad Iflar (UNP), 14,153 pv; Karandana Lekamlage Rathnayake (UNP), 13,180 pv; Upathissa Silva Hiripitiyage Maithripala (UNP), 13,110 pv; and Asirwadam Masilamay Denilrajan (CWC), 4,328 pv.

== 2005 Presidential Election ==
Results of the 5th presidential election held on 17 November 2005 for the district:

Candidate	Party	Votes per Polling Division								Postal Votes	Total Votes	%
Candidate	Party	Balan -goda	Eheli- yagoda	Kala- wana	Kolonna	Niviti -gala	Pelma- dulla	Rak- wana	Ratna -pura	Postal Votes	Total Votes	%
Mahinda Rajapaksa	UPFA	35,410	37,243	24,463	52,947	34,569	26,511	33,169	43,251	6,697	294,260	53.01%
Ranil Wickremasinghe	UNP	34,049	29,255	18,740	38,163	29,987	27,178	34,413	37,253	3,800	252,838	45.55%
Siritunga Jayasuriya	USP	314	254	176	324	324	257	309	259	3	2,220	0.40%
A.A. Suraweera	NDF	306	210	175	398	271	206	278	276	2	2,122	0.38%
Victor Hettigoda	ULPP	100	77	67	107	111	100	87	111	35	795	0.14%
Chamil Jayaneththi	NLF	91	69	47	142	71	64	82	73	6	645	0.12%
Aruna de Soyza	RPP	62	62	58	97	59	53	73	91	2	557	0.10%
Wimal Geeganage	SLNF	95	34	33	110	46	50	44	83	1	496	0.09%
Anura De Silva	ULF	50	42	37	57	50	36	48	73	0	393	0.07%
A.K.J. Arachchige	DUA	48	25	26	66	40	36	41	48	0	330	0.06%
P. Nelson Perera	SLPF	31	12	16	34	26	25	33	27	2	206	0.04%
Wije Dias	SEP	22	12	15	24	18	17	10	14	2	134	0.02%
H.S. Dharmadwaja	UNAF	9	7	7	10	10	4	18	13	0	78	0.01%
Valid Votes		70,587	67,302	43,860	92,479	65,582	54,537	68,605	81,572	10,550	555,074	100.00%
Rejected Votes		836	502	414	961	560	570	805	720	142	5,510	
Total Polled		71,423	67,804	44,274	93,440	66,142	55,107	69,410	82,292	10,692	560,584	
Registered Electors		87,938	83,705	52,156	115,991	78,157	65,445	84,595	100,230		668,217	
Turnout		81.22%	81.00%	84.89%	80.56%	84.63%	84.20%	82.05%	82.10%		83.89%	

== 2008 Provincial Council Election ==
Results of the 5th Sabaragamuwa provincial council election held on 23 August 2008 for the district:

Party	Votes per Polling Division								Postal Votes	Total Votes	%	Seats
Party	Balan -goda	Eheli- yagoda	Kala- wana	Kolonna	Niviti -gala	Pelma- dulla	Rak- wana	Ratna -pura	Postal Votes	Total Votes	%	Seats
United People's Freedom Alliance (SLFP et al.)	32,496	30,377	22,348	45,785	31,333	25,030	30,683	37,953	4,213	260,218	55.22%	13
United National Party	23,775	24,488	15,659	27,358	21,916	21,695	25,122	30,173	1,810	191,996	40.74%	10
Janatha Vimukthi Peramuna	1,039	849	783	3,339	645	592	1,001	1,165	290	9,703	2.06%	1
Ceylon Workers' Congress	688	399	126	291	681	1,253	1,060	603	34	5,135	1.09%	0
Up-Country People's Front	332	27	41	28	61	596	159	172	2	1,418	0.30%	0
United National Alliance	91	95	66	97	122	113	105	131	1	821	0.17%	0
United Socialist Party	68	99	48	65	90	189	48	92	6	705	0.15%	0
Left Front (NSSP et al.)	13	178	6	11	33	23	15	59	8	346	0.07%	0
National Development Front	71	16	22	37	16	13	42	46	1	264	0.06%	0
Independent 8	14	18	9	29	16	13	18	11	0	128	0.03%	0
Independent 9	15	9	4	22	12	7	12	14	1	96	0.02%	0
Independent 5	7	7	4	8	9	8	5	12	0	60	0.01%	0
Independent 6	3	4	4	16	13	5	10	4	0	59	0.01%	0
United Lanka Great Council	6	6	2	10	4	4	13	10	1	56	0.01%	0
Independent 3	9	4	5	10	2	1	9	7	0	47	0.01%	0
Independent 2	5	5	4	11	4	8	3	4	1	45	0.01%	0
Independent 1	9	3	3	6	5	3	5	5	0	39	0.01%	0
Independent 7	5	10	0	4	1	2	5	3	1	31	0.01%	0
Ruhuna People's Party	7	1	1	1	7	4	7	3	0	31	0.01%	0
Independent 4	4	4	2	4	6	2	1	3	1	27	0.01%	0
Sri Lanka Progressive Front	4	1	1	5	2	1	2	3	0	19	0.00%	0
Valid Votes	58,661	56,600	39,138	77,137	54,978	49,562	58,325	70,473	6,370	471,244	100.00%	24
Rejected Votes	3,947	2,394	1,788	3,933	2,994	3,100	3,811	3,625	177	25,769		
Total Polled	62,608	58,994	40,926	81,070	57,972	52,662	62,136	74,098	6,547	497,013		
Registered Electors	93,468	87,782	55,683	123,997	82,850	73,056	90,894	105,475		713,205		
Turnout	66.98%	67.21%	73.50%	65.38%	69.97%	72.08%	68.36%	70.25%		69.69%		

== 2010 Presidential Election ==
Results of the 6th presidential election held on 26 January 2010 for the district:

Candidate	Party	Votes per Polling Division								Postal Votes	Total Votes	%
Candidate	Party	Balan -goda	Eheli- yagoda	Kala- wana	Kolonna	Niviti -gala	Pelma- dulla	Rak- wana	Ratna -pura	Postal Votes	Total Votes	%
Mahinda Rajapaksa	UPFA	46,716	46,177	31,514	65,255	45,248	34,773	43,368	55,225	9,458	377,734	63.76%
Sarath Fonseka	NDF	28,201	22,277	14,009	31,029	22,431	24,283	27,302	29,891	4,143	203,566	34.36%
M.C.M. Ismail	DUNF	255	158	141	248	257	191	375	133	9	1,767	0.30%
A.A. Suraweera	NDF	200	224	141	256	220	151	162	171	0	1,525	0.26%
W.V. Mahiman Ranjith	Ind 1	170	135	144	280	169	120	167	193	5	1,383	0.23%
C.J. Sugathsiri Gamage	UDF	142	105	104	116	173	167	191	126	2	1,126	0.19%
A.S.P Liyanage	SLLP	108	87	94	169	118	94	131	100	4	905	0.15%
Lal Perera	ONF	87	58	50	77	67	87	95	67	1	589	0.10%
Sarath Manamendra	NSH	105	38	37	69	67	74	104	56	2	552	0.09%
Ukkubanda Wijekoon	Ind 3	83	63	40	73	82	42	73	76	2	534	0.09%
Siritunga Jayasuriya	USP	81	47	57	67	85	65	66	58	2	528	0.09%
Aithurus M. Illias	Ind 2	46	40	25	43	41	24	40	39	2	300	0.05%
Vikramabahu Karunaratne	LF	48	36	18	52	40	25	37	31	4	291	0.05%
M. K. Shivajilingam	Ind 5	45	27	8	26	44	43	45	36	4	278	0.05%
Sanath Pinnaduwa	NA	36	13	15	20	39	41	39	28	0	231	0.04%
Wije Dias	SEP	30	15	13	27	40	34	26	29	2	216	0.04%
M. Mohamed Musthaffa	Ind 4	24	9	14	30	30	23	18	28	0	176	0.03%
Battaramulla Seelarathana	JP	27	13	10	31	27	14	20	17	1	160	0.03%
Senaratna de Silva	PNF	26	12	15	19	18	18	25	17	0	150	0.03%
Aruna de Soyza	RPP	18	14	11	14	22	25	29	9	1	143	0.02%
M.B. Thaminimulla	ACAKO	25	17	7	14	29	16	19	13	0	140	0.02%
Sarath Kongahage	UNAF	17	10	9	17	45	9	12	13	0	132	0.02%
Valid Votes		76,490	69,575	46,476	97,932	69,292	60,319	72,344	86,356	13,642	592,426	100.00%
Rejected Votes		589	416	278	708	574	617	562	575	111	4,430	
Total Polled		77,079	69,991	46,754	98,640	69,866	60,936	72,906	86,931	13,753	596,856	
Registered Electors		96,855	89,518	57,232	127,375	86,973	75,685	92,891	108,122		734,651	
Turnout		79.58%	78.19%	81.69%	77.44%	80.33%	80.51%	78.49%	80.40%		81.24%	

== 2010 Parliamentary General Election ==
Results of the 14th parliamentary election held on 8 April 2010 for the district:

Party	Votes per Polling Division								Postal Votes	Total Votes	%	Seats
Party	Balan -goda	Eheli- yagoda	Kala- wana	Kolonna	Niviti -gala	Pelma- dulla	Rak- wana	Ratna -pura	Postal Votes	Total Votes	%	Seats
United People's Freedom Alliance (SLFP, CWC et al.)	36,020	37,329	26,030	49,778	37,930	28,453	35,835	42,637	11,315	305,327	68.86%	7
United National Front (UNP, SLMC, DPF, SLFP(P))	18,410	14,346	8,187	17,511	13,603	14,817	16,179	19,013	3,010	125,076	28.21%	3
Democratic National Alliance (JVP et al.)	1,200	1,012	526	3,455	668	704	1,037	1,755	696	11,053	2.49%	0
Our National Front	60	19	23	87	31	43	39	46	4	352	0.08%	0
National Development Front	33	36	20	34	41	14	14	44	1	237	0.05%	0
United Socialist Party	18	23	19	24	26	34	15	26	4	189	0.04%	0
Independent 11	17	45	11	26	25	13	17	15	4	173	0.04%	0
United National Alternative Front	29	17	14	33	17	20	17	16	0	163	0.04%	0
Sri Lanka National Front	3	0	23	40	7	4	13	4	3	97	0.02%	0
United Democratic Front	12	4	4	13	14	9	10	9	1	76	0.02%	0
Left Liberation Front	6	22	4	10	9	10	8	3	3	75	0.02%	0
Independent 8	5	5	20	6	8	6	6	4	0	60	0.01%	0
Janasetha Peramuna	7	0	5	2	11	8	10	13	4	60	0.01%	0
Independent 10	5	10	3	7	9	7	8	7	1	57	0.01%	0
Independent 2	14	4	8	6	3	7	6	5	0	53	0.01%	0
Independent 7	3	5	3	18	8	1	4	5	0	47	0.01%	0
Independent 9	5	6	1	6	10	3	7	8	0	46	0.01%	0
Independent 3	1	4	2	8	10	8	6	4	0	43	0.01%	0
Independent 1	9	5	2	4	4	6	3	2	4	39	0.01%	0
United Lanka Great Council	11	2	4	3	6	5	5	0	0	36	0.01%	0
Patriotic National Front	2	4	2	7	4	4	5	5	1	34	0.01%	0
Independent 4	1	1	5	10	3	1	1	1	0	23	0.01%	0
Independent 5	4	4	2	1	4	3	2	0	1	21	0.00%	0
Sinhalaye Mahasammatha Bhoomiputra Pakshaya	1	2	0	1	1	2	3	3	2	15	0.00%	0
Independent 6	0	0	1	2	2	4	2	0	0	11	0.00%	0
Sri Lanka Labour Party	1	3	0	1	1	1	1	2	0	10	0.00%	0
Valid Votes	55,877	52,908	34,919	71,093	52,455	44,187	53,253	63,627	15,054	443,373	100.00%	10
Rejected Votes	5,584	3,851	3,263	4,358	4,559	4,740	5,031	5,215	421	37,022		
Total Polled	61,461	56,759	38,182	75,451	57,014	48,927	58,284	68,842	15,475	480,395		
Registered Electors	96,855	89,518	57,232	127,375	86,973	75,685	92,891	108,122		734,651		
Turnout	63.46%	63.41%	66.71%	59.24%	65.55%	64.65%	62.74%	63.67%		65.39%		

The following candidates were elected: W. D. J. Senewiratne (UPFA-SLFP), 125,816 preference votes (pv); Pavithra Devi Wanniarachchi (UPFA-SLFP), 110,220 pv; Premalal Jayasekara (UPFA-SLFP), 73,175 pv; Janaka Wakkumbura (UPFA), 70,473 pv; Thalatha Atukorale (UNF-UNP), 64,592 pv; Ranjan Ramanayake (UNF), 59,318 pv; Vasudeva Nanayakkara (UPFA-DLF), 56,493 pv; Thirimadura Ranjith De Soysa (UPFA), 47,147 pv; Sanny Rohana (UPFA), 37,902 pv; and Dunesh Gankanda (UNF-UNP), 34,219 pv.
