= Rakwana Polling Division =

Rakwana
- Polling Division
- Interactive map of Rakwana
- Coordinates: 6.543272°N 80.677187°E
- Country: Sri Lanka
- Province: Sabaragamuwa Province, Sri Lanka
- Electoral District: Ratnapura Electoral District

Area
  - Total: 433.63 km^{2} (167.43 sq mi)

Population (2012)
  - Total: 134,039
  - Density: 309/km^{2} (800/sq mi)
- ISO 3166 code: EC-21E

The Rakwana Polling Division is a Polling Division in the Ratnapura Electoral District, in the Sabaragamuwa Province, Sri Lanka.

== Presidential Election Results ==
=== Summary ===
The winner of Rakwana has matched the final country result 6 out of 8 times. Hence, Rakwana is a Weak Bellwether for Presidential Elections.

Year	Rakwana	Ratnapura Electoral District	MAE %	Sri Lanka	MAE %
2019	SLPP	SLPP	5.96%	SLPP	0.92%
2015	UPFA	UPFA	3.57%	NDF	4.58%
2010	UPFA	UPFA	3.59%	UPFA	2.17%
2005	UNP	UPFA	4.57%	UPFA	1.82%
1999	PA	PA	4.48%	PA	3.75%
1994	PA	PA	6.41%	PA	10.56%
1988	UNP	UNP	5.54%	UNP	5.82%
1982	UNP	UNP	4.34%	UNP	2.14%
Matches/Mean MAE	6/8	7/8	4.81%	8/8	3.97%

=== 2019 Sri Lankan Presidential Election ===
Party	Rakwana		Ratnapura Electoral District		Sri Lanka	
Party	Votes	%	Votes	%	Votes	%
SLPP	48,867	53.86%	448,044	59.93%	6,924,255	52.25%
NDF	38,008	41.89%	264,503	35.38%	5,564,239	41.99%
Other Parties (with < 1%)	2,120	2.34%	16,237	2.17%	345,452	2.61%
NMPP	1,743	1.92%	18,887	2.53%	418,553	3.16%
Valid Votes	90,738	99.17%	747,671	99.22%	13,252,499	98.99%
Rejected Votes	757	0.83%	5,853	0.78%	135,452	1.01%
Total Polled	91,495	86.30%	753,524	87.11%	13,387,951	83.71%
Registered Electors	106,025		864,979		15,992,568	

=== 2015 Sri Lankan Presidential Election ===
Party	Rakwana		Ratnapura Electoral District		Sri Lanka	
Party	Votes	%	Votes	%	Votes	%
UPFA	42,940	51.99%	379,053	55.74%	5,768,090	47.58%
NDF	38,366	46.45%	292,514	43.01%	6,217,162	51.28%
Other Parties (with < 1%)	1,283	1.55%	8,517	1.25%	138,200	1.14%
Valid Votes	82,589	98.78%	680,084	98.89%	12,123,452	98.85%
Rejected Votes	1,023	1.22%	7,656	1.11%	140,925	1.15%
Total Polled	83,612	81.48%	687,740	82.69%	12,264,377	78.69%
Registered Electors	102,618		831,712		15,585,942	

=== 2010 Sri Lankan Presidential Election ===
Party	Rakwana		Ratnapura Electoral District		Sri Lanka	
Party	Votes	%	Votes	%	Votes	%
UPFA	43,368	59.95%	377,734	63.76%	6,015,934	57.88%
NDF	27,302	37.74%	203,566	34.36%	4,173,185	40.15%
Other Parties (with < 1%)	1,674	2.31%	11,126	1.88%	204,494	1.97%
Valid Votes	72,344	99.23%	592,426	99.26%	10,393,613	99.03%
Rejected Votes	562	0.77%	4,430	0.74%	101,838	0.97%
Total Polled	72,906	78.49%	596,856	79.75%	10,495,451	66.70%
Registered Electors	92,891		748,404		15,734,587	

=== 2005 Sri Lankan Presidential Election ===
Party	Rakwana		Ratnapura Electoral District		Sri Lanka	
Party	Votes	%	Votes	%	Votes	%
UNP	34,413	50.16%	252,838	45.55%	4,706,366	48.43%
UPFA	33,169	48.35%	294,260	53.01%	4,887,152	50.29%
Other Parties (with < 1%)	1,023	1.49%	7,976	1.44%	123,521	1.27%
Valid Votes	68,605	98.84%	555,074	99.02%	9,717,039	98.88%
Rejected Votes	805	1.16%	5,510	0.98%	109,869	1.12%
Total Polled	69,410	82.05%	560,584	82.57%	9,826,908	69.51%
Registered Electors	84,595		678,909		14,136,979	

=== 1999 Sri Lankan Presidential Election ===
Party	Rakwana		Ratnapura Electoral District		Sri Lanka	
Party	Votes	%	Votes	%	Votes	%
PA	28,305	47.81%	250,409	52.13%	4,312,157	51.12%
UNP	28,059	47.39%	202,621	42.18%	3,602,748	42.71%
JVP	1,552	2.62%	16,482	3.43%	343,927	4.08%
Other Parties (with < 1%)	1,293	2.18%	10,852	2.26%	176,679	2.09%
Valid Votes	59,209	98.25%	480,364	98.15%	8,435,754	97.69%
Rejected Votes	1,055	1.75%	9,038	1.85%	199,536	2.31%
Total Polled	60,264	79.89%	489,402	81.27%	8,635,290	72.17%
Registered Electors	75,436		602,172		11,965,536	

=== 1994 Sri Lankan Presidential Election ===
Party	Rakwana		Ratnapura Electoral District		Sri Lanka	
Party	Votes	%	Votes	%	Votes	%
PA	27,997	51.48%	257,265	58.07%	4,709,205	62.28%
UNP	25,338	46.59%	177,924	40.16%	2,715,283	35.91%
Other Parties (with < 1%)	1,049	1.93%	7,842	1.77%	137,040	1.81%
Valid Votes	54,384	98.09%	443,031	98.31%	7,561,526	98.03%
Rejected Votes	1,057	1.91%	7,595	1.69%	151,706	1.97%
Total Polled	55,441	79.54%	450,626	80.02%	7,713,232	69.12%
Registered Electors	69,702		563,174		11,158,880	

=== 1988 Sri Lankan Presidential Election ===
Party	Rakwana		Ratnapura Electoral District		Sri Lanka	
Party	Votes	%	Votes	%	Votes	%
UNP	26,643	57.93%	180,622	51.75%	2,569,199	50.43%
SLFP	18,744	40.75%	159,879	45.81%	2,289,857	44.95%
SLMP	608	1.32%	8,516	2.44%	235,701	4.63%
Valid Votes	45,995	98.84%	349,017	98.84%	5,094,754	98.24%
Rejected Votes	538	1.16%	4,113	1.16%	91,499	1.76%
Total Polled	46,533	79.46%	353,130	76.64%	5,186,256	55.87%
Registered Electors	58,565		460,735		9,283,143	

=== 1982 Sri Lankan Presidential Election ===
Party	Rakwana		Ratnapura Electoral District		Sri Lanka	
Party	Votes	%	Votes	%	Votes	%
UNP	24,986	55.93%	175,903	50.90%	3,450,815	52.93%
SLFP	17,936	40.15%	152,506	44.13%	2,546,348	39.05%
JVP	1,339	3.00%	11,283	3.26%	273,428	4.19%
Other Parties (with < 1%)	410	0.92%	5,912	1.71%	249,460	3.83%
Valid Votes	44,671	99.36%	345,604	99.02%	6,520,156	98.78%
Rejected Votes	289	0.64%	3,407	0.98%	80,470	1.22%
Total Polled	44,960	87.50%	349,011	85.91%	6,600,626	80.15%
Registered Electors	51,385		406,275		8,235,358	

== Parliamentary Election Results ==
=== Summary ===
The winner of Rakwana has matched the final country result 6 out of 7 times. Hence, Rakwana can be seen as a Bellwether for Parliamentary Elections.

Year	Rakwana	Ratnapura Electoral District	MAE %	Sri Lanka	MAE %
2015	UNP	UPFA	5.25%	UNP	4.11%
2010	UPFA	UPFA	1.71%	UPFA	4.67%
2004	UPFA	UPFA	4.53%	UPFA	5.46%
2001	UNP	UNP	3.64%	UNP	4.22%
2000	PA	PA	3.19%	PA	4.36%
1994	UNP	PA	6.45%	PA	6.92%
1989	UNP	UNP	5.99%	UNP	7.89%
Matches/Mean MAE	6/7	6/7	4.40%	7/7	5.38%

=== 2015 Sri Lankan Parliamentary Election ===
Party	Rakwana		Ratnapura Electoral District		Sri Lanka	
Party	Votes	%	Votes	%	Votes	%
UNP	39,172	50.95%	284,117	44.96%	5,098,916	45.77%
UPFA	35,587	46.29%	323,636	51.21%	4,732,664	42.48%
JVP	1,838	2.39%	21,525	3.41%	544,154	4.88%
Other Parties (with < 1%)	279	0.36%	2,720	0.43%	83,333	0.75%
Valid Votes	76,876	95.83%	631,998	96.46%	11,140,333	95.35%
Rejected Votes	3,323	4.14%	23,026	3.51%	516,926	4.42%
Total Polled	80,219	78.17%	655,222	80.88%	11,684,111	77.66%
Registered Electors	102,618		810,082		15,044,490	

=== 2010 Sri Lankan Parliamentary Election ===
Party	Rakwana		Ratnapura Electoral District		Sri Lanka	
Party	Votes	%	Votes	%	Votes	%
UPFA	35,835	67.30%	305,327	68.87%	4,846,388	60.38%
UNP	16,179	30.39%	125,076	28.21%	2,357,057	29.37%
DNA	1,037	1.95%	11,053	2.49%	441,251	5.50%
Other Parties (with < 1%)	194	0.36%	1,853	0.42%	35,498	0.44%
Valid Votes	53,245	91.35%	443,309	92.28%	8,026,322	96.03%
Rejected Votes	5,031	8.63%	37,022	7.71%	581,465	6.96%
Total Polled	58,284	62.74%	480,395	64.02%	8,358,246	59.29%
Registered Electors	92,891		750,416		14,097,690	

=== 2004 Sri Lankan Parliamentary Election ===
Party	Rakwana		Ratnapura Electoral District		Sri Lanka	
Party	Votes	%	Votes	%	Votes	%
UPFA	29,509	49.21%	261,450	53.14%	4,223,126	45.70%
UNP	28,453	47.44%	205,490	41.77%	3,486,792	37.73%
JHU	1,644	2.74%	20,801	4.23%	552,723	5.98%
Other Parties (with < 1%)	365	0.61%	4,262	0.87%	58,082	0.63%
Valid Votes	59,971	94.62%	492,003	94.55%	9,241,931	94.52%
Rejected Votes	3,408	5.38%	28,346	5.45%	534,452	5.47%
Total Polled	63,379	77.87%	520,349	80.42%	9,777,821	75.74%
Registered Electors	81,393		647,035		12,909,631	

=== 2001 Sri Lankan Parliamentary Election ===
Party	Rakwana		Ratnapura Electoral District		Sri Lanka	
Party	Votes	%	Votes	%	Votes	%
UNP	30,637	51.37%	227,202	46.41%	4,086,026	45.62%
PA	24,316	40.77%	212,794	43.46%	3,330,815	37.19%
JVP	3,693	6.19%	40,377	8.25%	815,353	9.10%
Other Parties (with < 1%)	997	1.67%	9,205	1.88%	131,990	1.47%
Valid Votes	59,643	92.86%	489,578	94.14%	8,955,844	94.77%
Rejected Votes	4,589	7.14%	30,483	5.86%	494,009	5.23%
Total Polled	64,232	81.74%	520,061	83.41%	9,449,878	76.03%
Registered Electors	78,583		623,506		12,428,762	

=== 2000 Sri Lankan Parliamentary Election ===
Party	Rakwana		Ratnapura Electoral District		Sri Lanka	
Party	Votes	%	Votes	%	Votes	%
PA	28,497	48.42%	244,142	50.63%	3,899,329	45.33%
UNP	27,685	47.04%	204,017	42.30%	3,451,765	40.12%
JVP	1,937	3.29%	22,222	4.61%	518,725	6.03%
Other Parties (with < 1%)	735	1.25%	11,873	2.46%	239,421	2.78%
Valid Votes	58,854	N/A	482,254	N/A	8,602,617	N/A

=== 1994 Sri Lankan Parliamentary Election ===
Party	Rakwana		Ratnapura Electoral District		Sri Lanka	
Party	Votes	%	Votes	%	Votes	%
UNP	31,183	54.66%	220,750	47.96%	3,498,370	44.04%
PA	25,324	44.39%	233,687	50.77%	3,887,805	48.94%
Other Parties (with < 1%)	541	0.95%	5,848	1.27%	223,848	2.82%
Valid Votes	57,048	94.99%	460,285	95.12%	7,943,688	95.20%
Rejected Votes	3,009	5.01%	23,611	4.88%	400,395	4.80%
Total Polled	60,057	86.16%	483,890	85.77%	8,344,095	74.75%
Registered Electors	69,702		564,194		11,163,064	

=== 1989 Sri Lankan Parliamentary Election ===
Party	Rakwana		Ratnapura Electoral District		Sri Lanka	
Party	Votes	%	Votes	%	Votes	%
UNP	29,204	65.65%	196,323	57.89%	2,838,005	50.71%
SLFP	14,610	32.84%	123,360	36.38%	1,785,369	31.90%
Other Parties (with < 1%)	670	1.51%	19,439	5.73%	85,932	1.54%
Valid Votes	44,484	93.98%	339,122	94.37%	5,596,468	93.87%
Rejected Votes	2,849	6.02%	20,248	5.63%	365,563	6.13%
Total Polled	47,333	81.83%	359,370	78.60%	5,962,031	63.60%
Registered Electors	57,842		457,224		9,374,164	

== Demographics ==
=== Ethnicity ===
The Rakwana Polling Division has a Sinhalese majority (85.2%) . In comparison, the Ratnapura Electoral District (which contains the Rakwana Polling Division) has a Sinhalese majority (87.1%)

Ethnicity in Rakwana
1. Sinhalese (85.2%)
2. Sri Lankan Tamil (6.50%)
3. Indian Tamil (6.00%)
4. Moor (2.00%)
5. Other (0.20%)

=== Religion ===
The Rakwana Polling Division has a Buddhist majority (85.0%) and a significant Hindu population (10.7%) . In comparison, the Ratnapura Electoral District (which contains the Rakwana Polling Division) has a Buddhist majority (86.7%)

Religion in Rakwana
1. Buddhist (85.0%)
2. Hindu (10.7%)
3. Muslim (2.40%)
4. Roman Catholic (1.10%)
5. Other (0.80%)
