= Pelmadulla Polling Division =

Pelmadulla
- Polling Division
- Interactive map of Pelmadulla
- Coordinates: 6.634826°N 80.497958°E
- Country: Sri Lanka
- Province: Sabaragamuwa Province, Sri Lanka
- Electoral District: Ratnapura Electoral District

Area
  - Total: 147.07 km^{2} (56.78 sq mi)

Population (2012)
  - Total: 89,469
  - Density: 608/km^{2} (1,570/sq mi)
- ISO 3166 code: EC-21C

The Pelmadulla Polling Division is a Polling Division in the Ratnapura Electoral District, in the Sabaragamuwa Province, Sri Lanka.

== Presidential Election Results ==
=== Summary ===
In Sri Lankan Presidential Elections, the winning party in the Pelmadulla Polling Division has aligned with the overall national outcome 6 out of 8 times.

Year	Pelmadulla	Ratnapura Electoral District	MAE %	Sri Lanka	MAE %
2019	SLPP	SLPP	5.62%	SLPP	1.25%
2015	UPFA	UPFA	4.95%	NDF	3.18%
2010	UPFA	UPFA	5.92%	UPFA	0.18%
2005	UNP	UPFA	4.29%	UPFA	1.53%
1999	PA	PA	1.08%	PA	0.76%
1994	PA	PA	4.34%	PA	8.49%
1988	UNP	UNP	0.64%	UNP	1.44%
1982	UNP	UNP	0.34%	UNP	3.36%
Matches/Mean MAE	6/8	7/8	3.40%	8/8	2.52%

=== 2019 Sri Lankan Presidential Election ===
Party	Pelmadulla		Ratnapura Electoral District		Sri Lanka	
Party	Votes	%	Votes	%	Votes	%
SLPP	41,469	54.33%	448,044	59.93%	6,924,255	52.25%
NDF	31,845	41.72%	264,503	35.38%	5,564,239	41.99%
Other Parties (with < 1%)	1,700	2.23%	16,237	2.17%	345,452	2.61%
NMPP	1,315	1.72%	18,887	2.53%	418,553	3.16%
Valid Votes	76,329	99.21%	747,671	99.22%	13,252,499	98.99%
Rejected Votes	606	0.79%	5,853	0.78%	135,452	1.01%
Total Polled	76,935	86.89%	753,524	87.11%	13,387,951	83.71%
Registered Electors	88,540		864,979		15,992,568	

=== 2015 Sri Lankan Presidential Election ===
Party	Pelmadulla		Ratnapura Electoral District		Sri Lanka	
Party	Votes	%	Votes	%	Votes	%
UPFA	34,975	50.64%	379,053	55.74%	5,768,090	47.58%
NDF	33,095	47.92%	292,514	43.01%	6,217,162	51.28%
Other Parties (with < 1%)	992	1.44%	8,517	1.25%	138,200	1.14%
Valid Votes	69,062	98.81%	680,084	98.89%	12,123,452	98.85%
Rejected Votes	834	1.19%	7,656	1.11%	140,925	1.15%
Total Polled	69,896	83.27%	687,740	82.69%	12,264,377	78.69%
Registered Electors	83,934		831,712		15,585,942	

=== 2010 Sri Lankan Presidential Election ===
Party	Pelmadulla		Ratnapura Electoral District		Sri Lanka	
Party	Votes	%	Votes	%	Votes	%
UPFA	34,773	57.65%	377,734	63.76%	6,015,934	57.88%
NDF	24,283	40.26%	203,566	34.36%	4,173,185	40.15%
Other Parties (with < 1%)	1,263	2.09%	11,126	1.88%	204,494	1.97%
Valid Votes	60,319	98.99%	592,426	99.26%	10,393,613	99.03%
Rejected Votes	617	1.01%	4,430	0.74%	101,838	0.97%
Total Polled	60,936	80.51%	596,856	79.75%	10,495,451	66.70%
Registered Electors	75,685		748,404		15,734,587	

=== 2005 Sri Lankan Presidential Election ===
Party	Pelmadulla		Ratnapura Electoral District		Sri Lanka	
Party	Votes	%	Votes	%	Votes	%
UNP	27,178	49.83%	252,838	45.55%	4,706,366	48.43%
UPFA	26,511	48.61%	294,260	53.01%	4,887,152	50.29%
Other Parties (with < 1%)	848	1.55%	7,976	1.44%	123,521	1.27%
Valid Votes	54,537	98.97%	555,074	99.02%	9,717,039	98.88%
Rejected Votes	570	1.03%	5,510	0.98%	109,869	1.12%
Total Polled	55,107	84.20%	560,584	82.57%	9,826,908	69.51%
Registered Electors	65,445		678,909		14,136,979	

=== 1999 Sri Lankan Presidential Election ===
Party	Pelmadulla		Ratnapura Electoral District		Sri Lanka	
Party	Votes	%	Votes	%	Votes	%
PA	24,995	51.50%	250,409	52.13%	4,312,157	51.12%
UNP	21,293	43.88%	202,621	42.18%	3,602,748	42.71%
JVP	1,195	2.46%	16,482	3.43%	343,927	4.08%
Other Parties (with < 1%)	1,047	2.16%	10,852	2.26%	176,679	2.09%
Valid Votes	48,530	98.10%	480,364	98.15%	8,435,754	97.69%
Rejected Votes	941	1.90%	9,038	1.85%	199,536	2.31%
Total Polled	49,471	83.88%	489,402	81.27%	8,635,290	72.17%
Registered Electors	58,977		602,172		11,965,536	

=== 1994 Sri Lankan Presidential Election ===
Party	Pelmadulla		Ratnapura Electoral District		Sri Lanka	
Party	Votes	%	Votes	%	Votes	%
PA	24,076	53.62%	257,265	58.07%	4,709,205	62.28%
UNP	19,994	44.53%	177,924	40.16%	2,715,283	35.91%
Other Parties (with < 1%)	833	1.86%	7,842	1.77%	137,040	1.81%
Valid Votes	44,903	98.02%	443,031	98.31%	7,561,526	98.03%
Rejected Votes	906	1.98%	7,595	1.69%	151,706	1.97%
Total Polled	45,809	80.94%	450,626	80.02%	7,713,232	69.12%
Registered Electors	56,593		563,174		11,158,880	

=== 1988 Sri Lankan Presidential Election ===
Party	Pelmadulla		Ratnapura Electoral District		Sri Lanka	
Party	Votes	%	Votes	%	Votes	%
UNP	18,370	51.40%	180,622	51.75%	2,569,199	50.43%
SLFP	16,719	46.78%	159,879	45.81%	2,289,857	44.95%
SLMP	651	1.82%	8,516	2.44%	235,701	4.63%
Valid Votes	35,740	98.89%	349,017	98.84%	5,094,754	98.24%
Rejected Votes	400	1.11%	4,113	1.16%	91,499	1.76%
Total Polled	36,140	82.47%	353,130	76.64%	5,186,256	55.87%
Registered Electors	43,820		460,735		9,283,143	

=== 1982 Sri Lankan Presidential Election ===
Party	Pelmadulla		Ratnapura Electoral District		Sri Lanka	
Party	Votes	%	Votes	%	Votes	%
UNP	17,212	50.99%	175,903	50.90%	3,450,815	52.93%
SLFP	15,106	44.75%	152,506	44.13%	2,546,348	39.05%
JVP	1,126	3.34%	11,283	3.26%	273,428	4.19%
Other Parties (with < 1%)	310	0.92%	5,912	1.71%	249,460	3.83%
Valid Votes	33,754	99.00%	345,604	99.02%	6,520,156	98.78%
Rejected Votes	340	1.00%	3,407	0.98%	80,470	1.22%
Total Polled	34,094	88.18%	349,011	85.91%	6,600,626	80.15%
Registered Electors	38,662		406,275		8,235,358	

== Parliamentary Election Results ==
=== Summary ===
In Sri Lankan Parliamentary Elections, the winning party in the Pelmadulla Polling Division has aligned with the overall national outcome 6 out of 7 times.

Year	Pelmadulla	Ratnapura Electoral District	MAE %	Sri Lanka	MAE %
2015	UNP	UPFA	5.17%	UNP	4.25%
2010	UPFA	UPFA	4.60%	UPFA	3.87%
2004	UPFA	UPFA	4.75%	UPFA	4.73%
2001	UNP	UNP	1.64%	UNP	4.41%
2000	PA	PA	1.29%	PA	4.52%
1994	UNP	PA	5.29%	PA	5.83%
1989	UNP	UNP	2.02%	UNP	5.98%
Matches/Mean MAE	6/7	6/7	3.54%	7/7	4.80%

=== 2015 Sri Lankan Parliamentary Election ===
Party	Pelmadulla		Ratnapura Electoral District		Sri Lanka	
Party	Votes	%	Votes	%	Votes	%
UNP	32,747	51.01%	284,117	44.96%	5,098,916	45.77%
UPFA	29,864	46.52%	323,636	51.21%	4,732,664	42.48%
JVP	1,303	2.03%	21,525	3.41%	544,154	4.88%
Other Parties (with < 1%)	284	0.44%	2,720	0.43%	83,333	0.75%
Valid Votes	64,198	95.79%	631,998	96.46%	11,140,333	95.35%
Rejected Votes	2,799	4.18%	23,026	3.51%	516,926	4.42%
Total Polled	67,020	79.85%	655,222	80.88%	11,684,111	77.66%
Registered Electors	83,934		810,082		15,044,490	

=== 2010 Sri Lankan Parliamentary Election ===
Party	Pelmadulla		Ratnapura Electoral District		Sri Lanka	
Party	Votes	%	Votes	%	Votes	%
UPFA	28,453	64.40%	305,327	68.87%	4,846,388	60.38%
UNP	14,817	33.54%	125,076	28.21%	2,357,057	29.37%
DNA	704	1.59%	11,053	2.49%	441,251	5.50%
Other Parties (with < 1%)	206	0.47%	1,853	0.42%	35,498	0.44%
Valid Votes	44,180	90.30%	443,309	92.28%	8,026,322	96.03%
Rejected Votes	4,740	9.69%	37,022	7.71%	581,465	6.96%
Total Polled	48,927	64.65%	480,395	64.02%	8,358,246	59.29%
Registered Electors	75,685		750,416		14,097,690	

=== 2004 Sri Lankan Parliamentary Election ===
Party	Pelmadulla		Ratnapura Electoral District		Sri Lanka	
Party	Votes	%	Votes	%	Votes	%
UPFA	23,403	48.24%	261,450	53.14%	4,223,126	45.70%
UNP	22,745	46.88%	205,490	41.77%	3,486,792	37.73%
JHU	1,979	4.08%	20,801	4.23%	552,723	5.98%
Other Parties (with < 1%)	386	0.80%	4,262	0.87%	58,082	0.63%
Valid Votes	48,513	94.05%	492,003	94.55%	9,241,931	94.52%
Rejected Votes	3,069	5.95%	28,346	5.45%	534,452	5.47%
Total Polled	51,582	81.48%	520,349	80.42%	9,777,821	75.74%
Registered Electors	63,305		647,035		12,909,631	

=== 2001 Sri Lankan Parliamentary Election ===
Party	Pelmadulla		Ratnapura Electoral District		Sri Lanka	
Party	Votes	%	Votes	%	Votes	%
UNP	24,135	49.32%	227,202	46.41%	4,086,026	45.62%
PA	21,329	43.58%	212,794	43.46%	3,330,815	37.19%
JVP	2,591	5.29%	40,377	8.25%	815,353	9.10%
NLF	492	1.01%	4,589	0.94%	45,901	0.51%
Other Parties (with < 1%)	393	0.80%	4,616	0.94%	86,089	0.96%
Valid Votes	48,940	93.68%	489,578	94.14%	8,955,844	94.77%
Rejected Votes	3,300	6.32%	30,483	5.86%	494,009	5.23%
Total Polled	52,240	84.82%	520,061	83.41%	9,449,878	76.03%
Registered Electors	61,586		623,506		12,428,762	

=== 2000 Sri Lankan Parliamentary Election ===
Party	Pelmadulla		Ratnapura Electoral District		Sri Lanka	
Party	Votes	%	Votes	%	Votes	%
PA	25,563	52.99%	244,142	50.63%	3,899,329	45.33%
UNP	20,385	42.26%	204,017	42.30%	3,451,765	40.12%
JVP	1,556	3.23%	22,222	4.61%	518,725	6.03%
Other Parties (with < 1%)	737	1.53%	11,873	2.46%	239,421	2.78%
Valid Votes	48,241	N/A	482,254	N/A	8,602,617	N/A

=== 1994 Sri Lankan Parliamentary Election ===
Party	Pelmadulla		Ratnapura Electoral District		Sri Lanka	
Party	Votes	%	Votes	%	Votes	%
UNP	25,008	53.37%	220,750	47.96%	3,498,370	44.04%
PA	21,302	45.46%	233,687	50.77%	3,887,805	48.94%
Other Parties (with < 1%)	551	1.18%	5,848	1.27%	223,848	2.82%
Valid Votes	46,861	94.86%	460,285	95.12%	7,943,688	95.20%
Rejected Votes	2,541	5.14%	23,611	4.88%	400,395	4.80%
Total Polled	49,402	87.29%	483,890	85.77%	8,344,095	74.75%
Registered Electors	56,593		564,194		11,163,064	

=== 1989 Sri Lankan Parliamentary Election ===
Party	Pelmadulla		Ratnapura Electoral District		Sri Lanka	
Party	Votes	%	Votes	%	Votes	%
UNP	19,493	57.17%	196,323	57.89%	2,838,005	50.71%
SLFP	13,752	40.33%	123,360	36.38%	1,785,369	31.90%
USP	678	1.99%	17,323	5.11%	17,323	0.31%
Other Parties (with < 1%)	175	0.51%	2,116	0.62%	68,609	1.23%
Valid Votes	34,098	94.37%	339,122	94.37%	5,596,468	93.87%
Rejected Votes	2,033	5.63%	20,248	5.63%	365,563	6.13%
Total Polled	36,131	83.57%	359,370	78.60%	5,962,031	63.60%
Registered Electors	43,236		457,224		9,374,164	

== Demographics ==
=== Ethnicity ===
The Pelmadulla Polling Division has a Sinhalese majority (85.4%) . In comparison, the Ratnapura Electoral District (which contains the Pelmadulla Polling Division) has a Sinhalese majority (87.1%)

Ethnicity in Pelmadulla
1. Sinhalese (85.4%)
2. Sri Lankan Tamil (7.00%)
3. Indian Tamil (6.90%)
4. Other (0.70%)

=== Religion ===
The Pelmadulla Polling Division has a Buddhist majority (85.3%) and a significant Hindu population (12.6%) . In comparison, the Ratnapura Electoral District (which contains the Pelmadulla Polling Division) has a Buddhist majority (86.7%)

Religion in Pelmadulla
1. Buddhist (85.3%)
2. Hindu (12.6%)
3. Other (2.10%)
