= Balangoda Polling Division =

Balangoda
- Polling Division
- Interactive map of Balangoda
- Coordinates: 6.659259°N 80.778092°E
- Country: Sri Lanka
- Province: Sabaragamuwa Province, Sri Lanka
- Electoral District: Ratnapura Electoral District

Area
  - Total: 523.89 km^{2} (202.28 sq mi)

Population (2012)
  - Total: 141,040
  - Density: 269/km^{2} (700/sq mi)
- ISO 3166 code: EC-21D

The Balangoda Polling Division is a Polling Division in the Ratnapura Electoral District, in the Sabaragamuwa Province, Sri Lanka.

== Presidential Election Results ==
=== Summary ===
The winner of Balangoda has matched the final country result 7 out of 8 times.

Year	Balangoda	Ratnapura Electoral District	MAE %	Sri Lanka	MAE %
2019	SLPP	SLPP	3.28%	SLPP	3.60%
2015	UPFA	UPFA	3.84%	NDF	4.29%
2010	UPFA	UPFA	2.57%	UPFA	3.17%
2005	UPFA	UPFA	2.73%	UPFA	0.16%
1999	PA	PA	2.39%	PA	1.67%
1994	PA	PA	1.47%	PA	5.61%
1988	UNP	UNP	0.41%	UNP	1.58%
1982	UNP	UNP	0.84%	UNP	3.93%
Matches/Mean MAE	7/8	7/8	2.19%	8/8	3.00%

=== 2019 Sri Lankan Presidential Election ===
Party	Balangoda		Ratnapura Electoral District		Sri Lanka	
Party	Votes	%	Votes	%	Votes	%
SLPP	53,120	56.42%	448,044	59.93%	6,924,255	52.25%
NDF	36,421	38.69%	264,503	35.38%	5,564,239	41.99%
Other Parties (with < 1%)	2,446	2.60%	16,237	2.17%	345,452	2.61%
NMPP	2,160	2.29%	18,887	2.53%	418,553	3.16%
Valid Votes	94,147	99.22%	747,671	99.22%	13,252,499	98.99%
Rejected Votes	741	0.78%	5,853	0.78%	135,452	1.01%
Total Polled	94,888	86.45%	753,524	87.11%	13,387,951	83.71%
Registered Electors	109,756		864,979		15,992,568	

=== 2015 Sri Lankan Presidential Election ===
Party	Balangoda		Ratnapura Electoral District		Sri Lanka	
Party	Votes	%	Votes	%	Votes	%
UPFA	44,798	51.81%	379,053	55.74%	5,768,090	47.58%
NDF	40,501	46.84%	292,514	43.01%	6,217,162	51.28%
Other Parties (with < 1%)	1,175	1.36%	8,517	1.25%	138,200	1.14%
Valid Votes	86,474	98.85%	680,084	98.89%	12,123,452	98.85%
Rejected Votes	1,009	1.15%	7,656	1.11%	140,925	1.15%
Total Polled	87,483	82.09%	687,740	82.69%	12,264,377	78.69%
Registered Electors	106,575		831,712		15,585,942	

=== 2010 Sri Lankan Presidential Election ===
Party	Balangoda		Ratnapura Electoral District		Sri Lanka	
Party	Votes	%	Votes	%	Votes	%
UPFA	46,716	61.07%	377,734	63.76%	6,015,934	57.88%
NDF	28,201	36.87%	203,566	34.36%	4,173,185	40.15%
Other Parties (with < 1%)	1,573	2.06%	11,126	1.88%	204,494	1.97%
Valid Votes	76,490	99.24%	592,426	99.26%	10,393,613	99.03%
Rejected Votes	589	0.76%	4,430	0.74%	101,838	0.97%
Total Polled	77,079	79.58%	596,856	79.75%	10,495,451	66.70%
Registered Electors	96,855		748,404		15,734,587	

=== 2005 Sri Lankan Presidential Election ===
Party	Balangoda		Ratnapura Electoral District		Sri Lanka	
Party	Votes	%	Votes	%	Votes	%
UPFA	35,410	50.17%	294,260	53.01%	4,887,152	50.29%
UNP	34,049	48.24%	252,838	45.55%	4,706,366	48.43%
Other Parties (with < 1%)	1,128	1.60%	7,976	1.44%	123,521	1.27%
Valid Votes	70,587	98.83%	555,074	99.02%	9,717,039	98.88%
Rejected Votes	836	1.17%	5,510	0.98%	109,869	1.12%
Total Polled	71,423	81.22%	560,584	82.57%	9,826,908	69.51%
Registered Electors	87,938		678,909		14,136,979	

=== 1999 Sri Lankan Presidential Election ===
Party	Balangoda		Ratnapura Electoral District		Sri Lanka	
Party	Votes	%	Votes	%	Votes	%
PA	31,231	49.87%	250,409	52.13%	4,312,157	51.12%
UNP	28,184	45.00%	202,621	42.18%	3,602,748	42.71%
JVP	1,810	2.89%	16,482	3.43%	343,927	4.08%
Other Parties (with < 1%)	1,403	2.24%	10,852	2.26%	176,679	2.09%
Valid Votes	62,628	98.07%	480,364	98.15%	8,435,754	97.69%
Rejected Votes	1,232	1.93%	9,038	1.85%	199,536	2.31%
Total Polled	63,860	81.62%	489,402	81.27%	8,635,290	72.17%
Registered Electors	78,239		602,172		11,965,536	

=== 1994 Sri Lankan Presidential Election ===
Party	Balangoda		Ratnapura Electoral District		Sri Lanka	
Party	Votes	%	Votes	%	Votes	%
PA	32,501	56.62%	257,265	58.07%	4,709,205	62.28%
UNP	23,943	41.71%	177,924	40.16%	2,715,283	35.91%
Other Parties (with < 1%)	959	1.67%	7,842	1.77%	137,040	1.81%
Valid Votes	57,403	97.82%	443,031	98.31%	7,561,526	98.03%
Rejected Votes	1,277	2.18%	7,595	1.69%	151,706	1.97%
Total Polled	58,680	80.23%	450,626	80.02%	7,713,232	69.12%
Registered Electors	73,136		563,174		11,158,880	

=== 1988 Sri Lankan Presidential Election ===
Party	Balangoda		Ratnapura Electoral District		Sri Lanka	
Party	Votes	%	Votes	%	Votes	%
UNP	24,802	52.05%	180,622	51.75%	2,569,199	50.43%
SLFP	22,074	46.33%	159,879	45.81%	2,289,857	44.95%
SLMP	771	1.62%	8,516	2.44%	235,701	4.63%
Valid Votes	47,647	98.93%	349,017	98.84%	5,094,754	98.24%
Rejected Votes	516	1.07%	4,113	1.16%	91,499	1.76%
Total Polled	48,163	80.73%	353,130	76.64%	5,186,256	55.87%
Registered Electors	59,661		460,735		9,283,143	

=== 1982 Sri Lankan Presidential Election ===
Party	Balangoda		Ratnapura Electoral District		Sri Lanka	
Party	Votes	%	Votes	%	Votes	%
UNP	22,923	50.53%	175,903	50.90%	3,450,815	52.93%
SLFP	20,679	45.58%	152,506	44.13%	2,546,348	39.05%
JVP	1,440	3.17%	11,283	3.26%	273,428	4.19%
Other Parties (with < 1%)	324	0.71%	5,912	1.71%	249,460	3.83%
Valid Votes	45,366	99.26%	345,604	99.02%	6,520,156	98.78%
Rejected Votes	336	0.74%	3,407	0.98%	80,470	1.22%
Total Polled	45,702	88.16%	349,011	85.91%	6,600,626	80.15%
Registered Electors	51,837		406,275		8,235,358	

== Parliamentary Election Results ==
=== Summary ===
The winner of Balangoda has matched the final country result 6 out of 7 times. Hence, Balangoda is a Strong Bellwether for Parliamentary Elections.

Year	Balangoda	Ratnapura Electoral District	MAE %	Sri Lanka	MAE %
2015	UNP	UPFA	3.64%	UNP	3.69%
2010	UPFA	UPFA	4.38%	UPFA	3.71%
2004	UPFA	UPFA	2.08%	UPFA	5.13%
2001	UNP	UNP	2.55%	UNP	3.78%
2000	PA	PA	0.93%	PA	4.23%
1994	UNP	PA	2.78%	PA	3.46%
1989	UNP	UNP	2.00%	UNP	6.69%
Matches/Mean MAE	6/7	6/7	2.62%	7/7	4.39%

=== 2015 Sri Lankan Parliamentary Election ===
Party	Balangoda		Ratnapura Electoral District		Sri Lanka	
Party	Votes	%	Votes	%	Votes	%
UNP	38,039	48.90%	284,117	44.96%	5,098,916	45.77%
UPFA	37,015	47.58%	323,636	51.21%	4,732,664	42.48%
JVP	2,307	2.97%	21,525	3.41%	544,154	4.88%
Other Parties (with < 1%)	430	0.55%	2,720	0.43%	83,333	0.75%
Valid Votes	77,791	95.13%	631,998	96.46%	11,140,333	95.35%
Rejected Votes	3,940	4.82%	23,026	3.51%	516,926	4.42%
Total Polled	81,771	76.73%	655,222	80.88%	11,684,111	77.66%
Registered Electors	106,575		810,082		15,044,490	

=== 2010 Sri Lankan Parliamentary Election ===
Party	Balangoda		Ratnapura Electoral District		Sri Lanka	
Party	Votes	%	Votes	%	Votes	%
UPFA	36,020	64.47%	305,327	68.87%	4,846,388	60.38%
UNP	18,410	32.95%	125,076	28.21%	2,357,057	29.37%
DNA	1,200	2.15%	11,053	2.49%	441,251	5.50%
Other Parties (with < 1%)	238	0.43%	1,853	0.42%	35,498	0.44%
Valid Votes	55,868	90.90%	443,309	92.28%	8,026,322	96.03%
Rejected Votes	5,584	9.09%	37,022	7.71%	581,465	6.96%
Total Polled	61,461	63.46%	480,395	64.02%	8,358,246	59.29%
Registered Electors	96,855		750,416		14,097,690	

=== 2004 Sri Lankan Parliamentary Election ===
Party	Balangoda		Ratnapura Electoral District		Sri Lanka	
Party	Votes	%	Votes	%	Votes	%
UPFA	32,042	51.24%	261,450	53.14%	4,223,126	45.70%
UNP	27,685	44.27%	205,490	41.77%	3,486,792	37.73%
JHU	2,364	3.78%	20,801	4.23%	552,723	5.98%
Other Parties (with < 1%)	448	0.72%	4,262	0.87%	58,082	0.63%
Valid Votes	62,539	93.51%	492,003	94.55%	9,241,931	94.52%
Rejected Votes	4,340	6.49%	28,346	5.45%	534,452	5.47%
Total Polled	66,879	78.42%	520,349	80.42%	9,777,821	75.74%
Registered Electors	85,285		647,035		12,909,631	

=== 2001 Sri Lankan Parliamentary Election ===
Party	Balangoda		Ratnapura Electoral District		Sri Lanka	
Party	Votes	%	Votes	%	Votes	%
UNP	30,982	49.83%	227,202	46.41%	4,086,026	45.62%
PA	25,849	41.58%	212,794	43.46%	3,330,815	37.19%
JVP	4,106	6.60%	40,377	8.25%	815,353	9.10%
Other Parties (with < 1%)	1,237	1.99%	9,205	1.88%	131,990	1.47%
Valid Votes	62,174	92.84%	489,578	94.14%	8,955,844	94.77%
Rejected Votes	4,793	7.16%	30,483	5.86%	494,009	5.23%
Total Polled	66,967	81.68%	520,061	83.41%	9,449,878	76.03%
Registered Electors	81,992		623,506		12,428,762	

=== 2000 Sri Lankan Parliamentary Election ===
Party	Balangoda		Ratnapura Electoral District		Sri Lanka	
Party	Votes	%	Votes	%	Votes	%
PA	31,411	52.02%	244,142	50.63%	3,899,329	45.33%
UNP	25,789	42.71%	204,017	42.30%	3,451,765	40.12%
JVP	2,232	3.70%	22,222	4.61%	518,725	6.03%
Other Parties (with < 1%)	952	1.58%	11,873	2.46%	239,421	2.78%
Valid Votes	60,384	N/A	482,254	N/A	8,602,617	N/A

=== 1994 Sri Lankan Parliamentary Election ===
Party	Balangoda		Ratnapura Electoral District		Sri Lanka	
Party	Votes	%	Votes	%	Votes	%
UNP	29,959	50.78%	220,750	47.96%	3,498,370	44.04%
PA	28,292	47.95%	233,687	50.77%	3,887,805	48.94%
Other Parties (with < 1%)	746	1.26%	5,848	1.27%	223,848	2.82%
Valid Votes	58,997	93.85%	460,285	95.12%	7,943,688	95.20%
Rejected Votes	3,870	6.16%	23,611	4.88%	400,395	4.80%
Total Polled	62,861	85.95%	483,890	85.77%	8,344,095	74.75%
Registered Electors	73,136		564,194		11,163,064	

=== 1989 Sri Lankan Parliamentary Election ===
Party	Balangoda		Ratnapura Electoral District		Sri Lanka	
Party	Votes	%	Votes	%	Votes	%
UNP	27,987	61.06%	196,323	57.89%	2,838,005	50.71%
SLFP	16,662	36.35%	123,360	36.38%	1,785,369	31.90%
USP	931	2.03%	17,323	5.11%	17,323	0.31%
Other Parties (with < 1%)	252	0.55%	2,116	0.62%	68,609	1.23%
Valid Votes	45,832	93.47%	339,122	94.37%	5,596,468	93.87%
Rejected Votes	3,201	6.53%	20,248	5.63%	365,563	6.13%
Total Polled	49,033	83.30%	359,370	78.60%	5,962,031	63.60%
Registered Electors	58,861		457,224		9,374,164	

== Demographics ==
=== Ethnicity ===
The Balangoda Polling Division has a Sinhalese majority (81.5%) and a significant Indian Tamil population (10.5%) . In comparison, the Ratnapura Electoral District (which contains the Balangoda Polling Division) has a Sinhalese majority (87.1%)

Ethnicity in Balangoda
1. Sinhalese (81.5%)
2. Indian Tamil (10.5%)
3. Moor (4.30%)
4. Sri Lankan Tamil (3.50%)
5. Other (0.20%)

=== Religion ===
The Balangoda Polling Division has a Buddhist majority (80.3%) and a significant Hindu population (12.1%) . In comparison, the Ratnapura Electoral District (which contains the Balangoda Polling Division) has a Buddhist majority (86.7%)

Religion in Balangoda
1. Buddhist (80.3%)
2. Hindu (12.1%)
3. Muslim (4.50%)
4. Roman Catholic (2.10%)
5. Other (1.00%)
