= Waruna Priyantha Liyanage =

Sri Lankan politician

Hon. Priyantha Liyanage MP
- ප්‍රියන්ත ලියනගේ பிரியந்த லியனகே

Ratnapura District
- Incumbent
- Assumed office 2020

Personal details
- Party: Samagi Jana Balawegaya

Waruna Priyantha Liyanage (Udagama Liyange Waruna Priyantha Liyanage) is a Sri Lankan politician. He was elected to the Sri Lankan Parliament from Ratnapura Electoral District as a member of the Samagi Jana Balawegaya party.
