= Basooriyage Ariyawansa =

Sri Lankan politician

Basooriyage Ariyawansa is a Sri Lankan politician. He was elected to the Sri Lankan Parliament from Ratnapura Electoral District as a member of the Samagi Jana Balawegaya.
