= Janaka Senarathna =

Sri Lankan politician

Janaka Senarathna is a Sri Lankan politician. He was elected to the Sri Lankan Parliament from Ratnapura Electoral District as a member of the National People's Power.
