= John Seneviratne =

Sri Lankan politician

Hon. John Senewiratne
- ජෝන් සෙනෙවිරත්න ஜான் செனவிரத்ன

Economic and Policy Development
- President: Gotabhaya Rajapaksha
- Prime Minister: Mahinda Rajapaksha

Minister of Labour and Trade Union Relations
- In office 4 September 2015 – 12 April 2018
- President: Maithripala Sirisena
- Prime Minister: Ranil Wickremesinghe

Minister of Health
- In office 2000–2001

Minister of Justice & Judicial Reforms

Minister of Power & Energy

Minister of Public Administration & Home Affairs
- In office 2010 – 12 January 2015

Member of Parliament for Ratnapura
- Incumbent
- Assumed office 15 February 1989

Personal details
- Born: January 15, 1941 (age 85)
- Party: Sri Lanka Freedom Party
- Other political affiliations: United People's Freedom Alliance
- Profession: Attorney-at-Law

W. D. John Seneviratne is a Sri Lankan politician, a member of the Parliament of Sri Lanka and a former government minister.

Born in Kahawatta, Ratnapura, Seneviratne was the son of Welathanthirige Podi Appuhami and Soma Wijesundara. When he was a child his father died, and he was raised by his mother Soma Wijesundara. He was educated at the Palmadulla Gangkanda Vidyalaya, Taxila Central College, Horana, Aquinas College, and at the Sri Lanka Law College.

At the Sri Lanka Law College, Seneviratne took an active role in the Law Student's movement. This experience helped him in being an active leader of the Sri Lanka Freedom Alliance.

When he first entered mainstream politics in 1977, the Sri Lanka Freedom Alliance was experiencing a severe crisis. During this crisis situation, Seneviratne acted as the chief organizer of the Palmadulla electorate.

Seneviratne first entered the Parliament of the Democratic Socialist Republic of Sri Lanka in 1989. He was appointed Deputy Minister of Education in 1995, and as Labour Minister in 1997. In 2000, he took over the Health Ministry. He later became the Minister of Justice and Judicial Reforms under the United People's Freedom Alliance Government; he is currently Minister of Power and Energy.

== See also ==
- Cabinet of Sri Lanka
