= Mahinda Ratnatilaka =

Sri Lankan politician

Hon. Mahinda Ratnatilaka MP

Member of Parliament for Ratnapura District
- In office 2000–2010

Personal details
- Born: 22 March 1948 Ratnapura, Sri Lanka
- Died: 19 June 2012 (aged 64) Colombo, Sri Lanka
- Party: United National Party (Democratic)
- Other political affiliations: United People's Freedom Alliance
- Spouse: Madura Rathnathilake
- Children: Kithsiri Rathnathilake, Mohan Rathnathilake, Manjula Rathnathilake, Viraj Rathnathilake
- Profession: Politician

Ihalakkankanamalage Mahinda Ratnatilaka (also Ihalakkankanamalage Mahinda Rathnathilake) was a Sri Lankan politician and a former member of the Parliament of Sri Lanka.
