= Kalawana Polling Division =

Kalawana
- Polling Division
- Interactive map of Kalawana
- Coordinates: 6.549396°N 80.386317°E
- Country: Sri Lanka
- Province: Sabaragamuwa Province, Sri Lanka
- Electoral District: Ratnapura Electoral District

Area
  - Total: 538.45 km^{2} (207.90 sq mi)

Population (2012)
  - Total: 82,201
  - Density: 153/km^{2} (400/sq mi)
- ISO 3166 code: EC-21G

The Kalawana Polling Division is a Polling Division in the Ratnapura Electoral District, in the Sabaragamuwa Province, Sri Lanka.

== Presidential Election Results ==
=== Summary ===
The winner of Kalawana matched the final country result 7 out of 8 times. Hence, Kalawana is a Strong Bellwether for Presidential Elections.

Year	Kalawana	Ratnapura Electoral District	MAE %	Sri Lanka	MAE %
2019	SLPP	SLPP	1.76%	SLPP	8.53%
2015	UPFA	UPFA	5.75%	NDF	13.90%
2010	UPFA	UPFA	4.03%	UPFA	9.76%
2005	UPFA	UPFA	2.75%	UPFA	5.52%
1999	PA	PA	2.56%	PA	3.32%
1994	PA	PA	0.95%	PA	5.08%
1988	UNP	UNP	0.91%	UNP	0.41%
1982	UNP	UNP	2.92%	UNP	5.92%
Matches/Mean MAE	7/8	7/8	2.70%	8/8	6.56%

=== 2019 Sri Lankan Presidential Election ===
Party	Kalawana		Ratnapura Electoral District		Sri Lanka	
Party	Votes	%	Votes	%	Votes	%
SLPP	35,399	61.86%	448,044	59.93%	6,924,255	52.25%
NDF	19,291	33.71%	264,503	35.38%	5,564,239	41.99%
Other Parties (with < 1%)	1,313	2.29%	16,237	2.17%	345,452	2.61%
NMPP	1,221	2.13%	18,887	2.53%	418,553	3.16%
Valid Votes	57,224	99.28%	747,671	99.22%	13,252,499	98.99%
Rejected Votes	415	0.72%	5,853	0.78%	135,452	1.01%
Total Polled	57,639	88.25%	753,524	87.11%	13,387,951	83.71%
Registered Electors	65,310		864,979		15,992,568	

=== 2015 Sri Lankan Presidential Election ===
Party	Kalawana		Ratnapura Electoral District		Sri Lanka	
Party	Votes	%	Votes	%	Votes	%
UPFA	32,336	61.50%	379,053	55.74%	5,768,090	47.58%
NDF	19,508	37.10%	292,514	43.01%	6,217,162	51.28%
Other Parties (with < 1%)	736	1.40%	8,517	1.25%	138,200	1.14%
Valid Votes	52,580	99.04%	680,084	98.89%	12,123,452	98.85%
Rejected Votes	511	0.96%	7,656	1.11%	140,925	1.15%
Total Polled	53,091	84.58%	687,740	82.69%	12,264,377	78.69%
Registered Electors	62,773		831,712		15,585,942	

=== 2010 Sri Lankan Presidential Election ===
Party	Kalawana		Ratnapura Electoral District		Sri Lanka	
Party	Votes	%	Votes	%	Votes	%
UPFA	31,514	67.81%	377,734	63.76%	6,015,934	57.88%
NDF	14,009	30.14%	203,566	34.36%	4,173,185	40.15%
Other Parties (with < 1%)	953	2.05%	11,126	1.88%	204,494	1.97%
Valid Votes	46,476	99.41%	592,426	99.26%	10,393,613	99.03%
Rejected Votes	278	0.59%	4,430	0.74%	101,838	0.97%
Total Polled	46,754	81.69%	596,856	79.75%	10,495,451	66.70%
Registered Electors	57,232		748,404		15,734,587	

=== 2005 Sri Lankan Presidential Election ===
Party	Kalawana		Ratnapura Electoral District		Sri Lanka	
Party	Votes	%	Votes	%	Votes	%
UPFA	24,463	55.78%	294,260	53.01%	4,887,152	50.29%
UNP	18,740	42.73%	252,838	45.55%	4,706,366	48.43%
Other Parties (with < 1%)	657	1.50%	7,976	1.44%	123,521	1.27%
Valid Votes	43,860	99.06%	555,074	99.02%	9,717,039	98.88%
Rejected Votes	414	0.94%	5,510	0.98%	109,869	1.12%
Total Polled	44,274	84.89%	560,584	82.57%	9,826,908	69.51%
Registered Electors	52,156		678,909		14,136,979	

=== 1999 Sri Lankan Presidential Election ===
Party	Kalawana		Ratnapura Electoral District		Sri Lanka	
Party	Votes	%	Votes	%	Votes	%
PA	21,261	55.36%	250,409	52.13%	4,312,157	51.12%
UNP	15,428	40.17%	202,621	42.18%	3,602,748	42.71%
JVP	963	2.51%	16,482	3.43%	343,927	4.08%
Other Parties (with < 1%)	754	1.96%	10,852	2.26%	176,679	2.09%
Valid Votes	38,406	98.60%	480,364	98.15%	8,435,754	97.69%
Rejected Votes	544	1.40%	9,038	1.85%	199,536	2.31%
Total Polled	38,950	83.90%	489,402	81.27%	8,635,290	72.17%
Registered Electors	46,426		602,172		11,965,536	

=== 1994 Sri Lankan Presidential Election ===
Party	Kalawana		Ratnapura Electoral District		Sri Lanka	
Party	Votes	%	Votes	%	Votes	%
PA	19,993	57.25%	257,265	58.07%	4,709,205	62.28%
UNP	14,434	41.33%	177,924	40.16%	2,715,283	35.91%
Other Parties (with < 1%)	496	1.42%	7,842	1.77%	137,040	1.81%
Valid Votes	34,923	98.67%	443,031	98.31%	7,561,526	98.03%
Rejected Votes	469	1.33%	7,595	1.69%	151,706	1.97%
Total Polled	35,392	81.78%	450,626	80.02%	7,713,232	69.12%
Registered Electors	43,279		563,174		11,158,880	

=== 1988 Sri Lankan Presidential Election ===
Party	Kalawana		Ratnapura Electoral District		Sri Lanka	
Party	Votes	%	Votes	%	Votes	%
UNP	14,316	50.25%	180,622	51.75%	2,569,199	50.43%
SLFP	12,994	45.61%	159,879	45.81%	2,289,857	44.95%
SLMP	1,180	4.14%	8,516	2.44%	235,701	4.63%
Valid Votes	28,490	98.72%	349,017	98.84%	5,094,754	98.24%
Rejected Votes	369	1.28%	4,113	1.16%	91,499	1.76%
Total Polled	28,859	78.97%	353,130	76.64%	5,186,256	55.87%
Registered Electors	36,544		460,735		9,283,143	

=== 1982 Sri Lankan Presidential Election ===
Party	Kalawana		Ratnapura Electoral District		Sri Lanka	
Party	Votes	%	Votes	%	Votes	%
UNP	13,806	48.80%	175,903	50.90%	3,450,815	52.93%
SLFP	13,644	48.22%	152,506	44.13%	2,546,348	39.05%
JVP	629	2.22%	11,283	3.26%	273,428	4.19%
Other Parties (with < 1%)	214	0.76%	5,912	1.71%	249,460	3.83%
Valid Votes	28,293	99.17%	345,604	99.02%	6,520,156	98.78%
Rejected Votes	237	0.83%	3,407	0.98%	80,470	1.22%
Total Polled	28,530	86.71%	349,011	85.91%	6,600,626	80.15%
Registered Electors	32,904		406,275		8,235,358	

== Parliamentary Election Results ==
=== Summary ===
The winner of Kalawana has matched the final country result 5 out of 7 times. Hence, Kalawana is a Weak Bellwether for Parliamentary Elections.

Year	Kalawana	Ratnapura Electoral District	MAE %	Sri Lanka	MAE %
2015	UPFA	UPFA	4.52%	UNP	8.27%
2010	UPFA	UPFA	5.28%	UPFA	10.51%
2004	UPFA	UPFA	3.09%	UPFA	6.59%
2001	PA	UNP	3.47%	UNP	5.24%
2000	PA	PA	3.57%	PA	4.90%
1994	PA	PA	0.51%	PA	2.85%
1989	UNP	UNP	1.05%	UNP	4.63%
Matches/Mean MAE	5/7	6/7	3.07%	7/7	6.14%

=== 2015 Sri Lankan Parliamentary Election ===
Party	Kalawana		Ratnapura Electoral District		Sri Lanka	
Party	Votes	%	Votes	%	Votes	%
UPFA	27,405	56.47%	323,636	51.21%	4,732,664	42.48%
UNP	19,889	40.98%	284,117	44.96%	5,098,916	45.77%
JVP	1,034	2.13%	21,525	3.41%	544,154	4.88%
Other Parties (with < 1%)	206	0.42%	2,720	0.43%	83,333	0.75%
Valid Votes	48,534	96.72%	631,998	96.46%	11,140,333	95.35%
Rejected Votes	1,638	3.26%	23,026	3.51%	516,926	4.42%
Total Polled	50,182	79.94%	655,222	80.88%	11,684,111	77.66%
Registered Electors	62,773		810,082		15,044,490	

=== 2010 Sri Lankan Parliamentary Election ===
Party	Kalawana		Ratnapura Electoral District		Sri Lanka	
Party	Votes	%	Votes	%	Votes	%
UPFA	26,030	74.55%	305,327	68.87%	4,846,388	60.38%
UNP	8,187	23.45%	125,076	28.21%	2,357,057	29.37%
DNA	526	1.51%	11,053	2.49%	441,251	5.50%
Other Parties (with < 1%)	173	0.50%	1,853	0.42%	35,498	0.44%
Valid Votes	34,916	91.45%	443,309	92.28%	8,026,322	96.03%
Rejected Votes	3,263	8.55%	37,022	7.71%	581,465	6.96%
Total Polled	38,182	66.71%	480,395	64.02%	8,358,246	59.29%
Registered Electors	57,232		750,416		14,097,690	

=== 2004 Sri Lankan Parliamentary Election ===
Party	Kalawana		Ratnapura Electoral District		Sri Lanka	
Party	Votes	%	Votes	%	Votes	%
UPFA	22,501	57.52%	261,450	53.14%	4,223,126	45.70%
UNP	15,726	40.20%	205,490	41.77%	3,486,792	37.73%
JHU	660	1.69%	20,801	4.23%	552,723	5.98%
Other Parties (with < 1%)	233	0.60%	4,262	0.87%	58,082	0.63%
Valid Votes	39,120	94.40%	492,003	94.55%	9,241,931	94.52%
Rejected Votes	2,322	5.60%	28,346	5.45%	534,452	5.47%
Total Polled	41,442	81.97%	520,349	80.42%	9,777,821	75.74%
Registered Electors	50,558		647,035		12,909,631	

=== 2001 Sri Lankan Parliamentary Election ===
Party	Kalawana		Ratnapura Electoral District		Sri Lanka	
Party	Votes	%	Votes	%	Votes	%
PA	18,445	48.04%	212,794	43.46%	3,330,815	37.19%
UNP	16,708	43.51%	227,202	46.41%	4,086,026	45.62%
JVP	2,506	6.53%	40,377	8.25%	815,353	9.10%
NLF	416	1.08%	4,589	0.94%	45,901	0.51%
Other Parties (with < 1%)	324	0.84%	4,616	0.94%	86,089	0.96%
Valid Votes	38,399	93.14%	489,578	94.14%	8,955,844	94.77%
Rejected Votes	2,830	6.86%	30,483	5.86%	494,009	5.23%
Total Polled	41,229	84.69%	520,061	83.41%	9,449,878	76.03%
Registered Electors	48,682		623,506		12,428,762	

=== 2000 Sri Lankan Parliamentary Election ===
Party	Kalawana		Ratnapura Electoral District		Sri Lanka	
Party	Votes	%	Votes	%	Votes	%
PA	21,224	55.48%	244,142	50.63%	3,899,329	45.33%
UNP	15,246	39.86%	204,017	42.30%	3,451,765	40.12%
JVP	1,237	3.23%	22,222	4.61%	518,725	6.03%
Other Parties (with < 1%)	546	1.43%	11,873	2.46%	239,421	2.78%
Valid Votes	38,253	N/A	482,254	N/A	8,602,617	N/A

=== 1994 Sri Lankan Parliamentary Election ===
Party	Kalawana		Ratnapura Electoral District		Sri Lanka	
Party	Votes	%	Votes	%	Votes	%
PA	18,312	50.50%	233,687	50.77%	3,887,805	48.94%
UNP	17,674	48.74%	220,750	47.96%	3,498,370	44.04%
Other Parties (with < 1%)	273	0.75%	5,848	1.27%	223,848	2.82%
Valid Votes	36,259	95.48%	460,285	95.12%	7,943,688	95.20%
Rejected Votes	1,716	4.52%	23,611	4.88%	400,395	4.80%
Total Polled	37,975	87.74%	483,890	85.77%	8,344,095	74.75%
Registered Electors	43,279		564,194		11,163,064	

=== 1989 Sri Lankan Parliamentary Election ===
Party	Kalawana		Ratnapura Electoral District		Sri Lanka	
Party	Votes	%	Votes	%	Votes	%
UNP	16,118	58.26%	196,323	57.89%	2,838,005	50.71%
SLFP	9,494	34.32%	123,360	36.38%	1,785,369	31.90%
USP	1,909	6.90%	17,323	5.11%	17,323	0.31%
Other Parties (with < 1%)	145	0.52%	2,116	0.62%	68,609	1.23%
Valid Votes	27,666	94.28%	339,122	94.37%	5,596,468	93.87%
Rejected Votes	1,680	5.72%	20,248	5.63%	365,563	6.13%
Total Polled	29,346	81.25%	359,370	78.60%	5,962,031	63.60%
Registered Electors	36,117		457,224		9,374,164	

== Demographics ==
=== Ethnicity ===
The Kalawana Polling Division has a Sinhalese majority (85.6%) . In comparison, the Ratnapura Electoral District (which contains the Kalawana Polling Division) has a Sinhalese majority (87.1%)

Ethnicity in Kalawana
1. Sinhalese (85.6%)
2. Indian Tamil (9.20%)
3. Sri Lankan Tamil (5.10%)
4. Other (0.10%)

=== Religion ===
The Kalawana Polling Division has a Buddhist majority (85.7%) and a significant Hindu population (12.9%) . In comparison, the Ratnapura Electoral District (which contains the Kalawana Polling Division) has a Buddhist majority (86.7%)

Religion in Kalawana
1. Buddhist (85.7%)
2. Hindu (12.9%)
3. Other (1.30%)
