= Deepal Gunasekara =

Sri Lankan politician

Hon. Deepal Gunasekara MP

Member of Parliament for Ratnapura District
- In office 2004–2010

Personal details
- Party: National Freedom Front
- Other political affiliations: United People's Freedom Alliance

N. Deepal Gunasekara is a Sri Lankan politician and former member of the Parliament of Sri Lanka from the Electoral District - 21- Ratnapura.
