= Jayatissa Ranaweera =

Sri Lankan politician

Hon. Jayatissa Ranaweera MP

Deputy Minister of Mahaweli Development
- In office 1998–2000

Deputy Minister of Land Development & Minor Export Agriculture
- In office 2000–2001

Deputy Minister of Provincial Councils & Local Government
- In office 2004–2007

Non-Cabinet Minister of Textile Industries
- In office 2007–2008

Non-Cabinet Minister of Irrigation
- In office 2008–2010

Member of Parliament for Ratnapura District
- In office 1994–2001
- In office 2004–2010

Personal details
- Born: 14 February 1956 (age 70) Embilipitiya
- Party: Sri Lanka Freedom Party
- Other political affiliations: United People's Freedom Alliance
- Spouse: Mrs. Mangalika Ranaweera
- Children: Raveendra; Chamara; Sachira; Dahara

Arachchige Jayatissa Ranaweera also known as Kolonne Sinhaya is a Sri Lankan politician, former member of the Parliament of Sri Lanka and a former cabinet minister. Currently, he is a member of the Sabaragamuwa Provincial Council and holds the position of the Council Chairman.
