= Nandasena =

Nandasena is a Sinhalese name that may refer to the following notable people:

Given name

- Nandasena Pathirana (born 1942), Sri Lankan cricket umpire
- Nandasena Perera (1954–2019), Sri Lankan golfer

Surname

- K. H. Nandasena (born 1954), Sri Lankan politician
