= Kekirawa Polling Division =

Kekirawa
- Polling Division
- Coordinates: 8.025635°N 80.627417°E
- Country: Sri Lanka
- Province: North Central Province, Sri Lanka
- Electoral District: Anuradhapura Electoral District

Area
  - Total: 771.25 km^{2} (297.78 sq mi)

Population (2012)
  - Total: 108,825
  - Density: 141/km^{2} (370/sq mi)
- ISO 3166 code: EC-17G

The Kekirawa Polling Division is a Polling Division in the Anuradhapura Electoral District, in the North Central Province, Sri Lanka.

== Presidential Election Results ==
=== Summary ===
The winner of Kekirawa has matched the final country result 6 out of 8 times. Hence, Kekirawa is a Weak Bellwether for Presidential Elections.

Year	Kekirawa	Anuradhapura Electoral District	MAE %	Sri Lanka	MAE %
2019	SLPP	SLPP	2.57%	SLPP	3.90%
2015	UPFA	UPFA	1.55%	NDF	4.32%
2010	UPFA	UPFA	2.50%	UPFA	5.68%
2005	UPFA	UPFA	3.82%	UPFA	0.92%
1999	PA	PA	1.95%	PA	1.01%
1994	PA	PA	3.05%	PA	1.41%
1988	SLFP	SLFP	0.27%	UNP	8.22%
1982	UNP	UNP	2.55%	UNP	2.23%
Matches/Mean MAE	6/8	6/8	2.28%	8/8	3.46%

=== 2019 Sri Lankan Presidential Election ===
Party	Kekirawa		Anuradhapura Electoral District		Sri Lanka	
Party	Votes	%	Votes	%	Votes	%
SLPP	39,361	56.65%	342,223	58.97%	6,924,255	52.25%
NDF	26,538	38.19%	202,348	34.87%	5,564,239	41.99%
NMPP	1,929	2.78%	22,879	3.94%	418,553	3.16%
Other Parties (with < 1%)	1,653	2.38%	12,896	2.22%	345,452	2.61%
Valid Votes	69,481	99.30%	580,346	99.16%	13,252,499	98.99%
Rejected Votes	493	0.70%	4,916	0.84%	135,452	1.01%
Total Polled	69,974	84.05%	585,262	85.76%	13,387,951	83.71%
Registered Electors	83,254		682,450		15,992,568	

=== 2015 Sri Lankan Presidential Election ===
Party	Kekirawa		Anuradhapura Electoral District		Sri Lanka	
Party	Votes	%	Votes	%	Votes	%
UPFA	32,563	51.96%	281,161	53.59%	5,768,090	47.58%
NDF	29,410	46.93%	238,407	45.44%	6,217,162	51.28%
Other Parties (with < 1%)	693	1.11%	5,065	0.97%	138,200	1.14%
Valid Votes	62,666	99.12%	524,633	99.15%	12,123,452	98.85%
Rejected Votes	559	0.88%	4,500	0.85%	140,925	1.15%
Total Polled	63,225	75.78%	529,133	77.71%	12,264,377	78.69%
Registered Electors	83,431		680,877		15,585,942	

=== 2010 Sri Lankan Presidential Election ===
Party	Kekirawa		Anuradhapura Electoral District		Sri Lanka	
Party	Votes	%	Votes	%	Votes	%
UPFA	34,101	63.75%	298,448	66.32%	6,015,934	57.88%
NDF	18,431	34.46%	143,761	31.94%	4,173,185	40.15%
Other Parties (with < 1%)	959	1.79%	7,829	1.74%	204,494	1.97%
Valid Votes	53,491	99.27%	450,038	99.17%	10,393,613	99.03%
Rejected Votes	396	0.73%	3,785	0.83%	101,838	0.97%
Total Polled	53,887	72.93%	453,823	73.65%	10,495,451	66.70%
Registered Electors	73,885		616,186		15,734,587	

=== 2005 Sri Lankan Presidential Election ===
Party	Kekirawa		Anuradhapura Electoral District		Sri Lanka	
Party	Votes	%	Votes	%	Votes	%
UPFA	26,220	51.19%	231,040	55.08%	4,887,152	50.29%
UNP	24,314	47.47%	182,956	43.62%	4,706,366	48.43%
Other Parties (with < 1%)	690	1.35%	5,438	1.30%	123,521	1.27%
Valid Votes	51,224	99.02%	419,434	98.92%	9,717,039	98.88%
Rejected Votes	506	0.98%	4,563	1.08%	109,869	1.12%
Total Polled	51,730	75.33%	423,997	75.41%	9,826,908	69.51%
Registered Electors	68,671		562,259		14,136,979	

=== 1999 Sri Lankan Presidential Election ===
Party	Kekirawa		Anuradhapura Electoral District		Sri Lanka	
Party	Votes	%	Votes	%	Votes	%
PA	23,631	52.86%	189,073	54.14%	4,312,157	51.12%
UNP	19,151	42.84%	139,180	39.86%	3,602,748	42.71%
JVP	1,144	2.56%	14,612	4.18%	343,927	4.08%
Other Parties (with < 1%)	778	1.74%	6,336	1.81%	176,679	2.09%
Valid Votes	44,704	97.89%	349,201	98.05%	8,435,754	97.69%
Rejected Votes	964	2.11%	6,949	1.95%	199,536	2.31%
Total Polled	45,668	77.82%	356,150	75.63%	8,635,290	72.17%
Registered Electors	58,684		470,907		11,965,536	

=== 1994 Sri Lankan Presidential Election ===
Party	Kekirawa		Anuradhapura Electoral District		Sri Lanka	
Party	Votes	%	Votes	%	Votes	%
PA	23,583	60.93%	200,146	63.99%	4,709,205	62.28%
UNP	14,517	37.51%	107,342	34.32%	2,715,283	35.91%
Other Parties (with < 1%)	604	1.56%	5,309	1.70%	137,040	1.81%
Valid Votes	38,704	98.00%	312,797	98.05%	7,561,526	98.03%
Rejected Votes	789	2.00%	6,205	1.95%	151,706	1.97%
Total Polled	39,493	77.48%	319,002	76.16%	7,713,232	69.12%
Registered Electors	50,969		418,857		11,158,880	

=== 1988 Sri Lankan Presidential Election ===
Party	Kekirawa		Anuradhapura Electoral District		Sri Lanka	
Party	Votes	%	Votes	%	Votes	%
SLFP	7,203	55.08%	73,154	55.15%	2,289,857	44.95%
UNP	5,683	43.46%	56,951	42.94%	2,569,199	50.43%
SLMP	191	1.46%	2,529	1.91%	235,701	4.63%
Valid Votes	13,077	99.02%	132,634	98.36%	5,094,754	98.24%
Rejected Votes	129	0.98%	2,207	1.64%	91,499	1.76%
Total Polled	13,206	32.20%	134,841	40.18%	5,186,256	55.87%
Registered Electors	41,013		335,551		9,283,143	

=== 1982 Sri Lankan Presidential Election ===
Party	Kekirawa		Anuradhapura Electoral District		Sri Lanka	
Party	Votes	%	Votes	%	Votes	%
UNP	15,454	54.02%	117,873	49.84%	3,450,815	52.93%
SLFP	12,281	42.93%	102,973	43.54%	2,546,348	39.05%
JVP	733	2.56%	13,911	5.88%	273,428	4.19%
Other Parties (with < 1%)	142	0.50%	1,766	0.75%	249,460	3.83%
Valid Votes	28,610	99.27%	236,523	99.04%	6,520,156	98.78%
Rejected Votes	209	0.73%	2,294	0.96%	80,470	1.22%
Total Polled	28,819	87.52%	238,817	84.68%	6,600,626	80.15%
Registered Electors	32,927		282,018		8,235,358	

== Parliamentary Election Results ==
=== Summary ===
The winner of Kekirawa matched the final country result all seven times. Hence, Kekirawa is a Perfect Bellwether for Parliamentary Elections.

Year	Kekirawa	Anuradhapura Electoral District	MAE %	Sri Lanka	MAE %
2015	UNP	UPFA	2.38%	UNP	3.19%
2010	UPFA	UPFA	17.26%	UPFA	11.16%
2004	UPFA	UPFA	3.28%	UPFA	5.86%
2001	UNP	UNP	4.14%	UNP	3.32%
2000	PA	PA	2.36%	PA	2.34%
1994	PA	PA	3.20%	PA	2.82%
1989	UNP	UNP	4.10%	UNP	4.68%
Matches/Mean MAE	7/7	6/7	5.25%	7/7	4.77%

=== 2015 Sri Lankan Parliamentary Election ===
Party	Kekirawa		Anuradhapura Electoral District		Sri Lanka	
Party	Votes	%	Votes	%	Votes	%
UNP	27,163	48.44%	213,072	44.85%	5,098,916	45.77%
UPFA	26,372	47.03%	229,856	48.39%	4,732,664	42.48%
JVP	2,359	4.21%	28,701	6.04%	544,154	4.88%
Other Parties (with < 1%)	183	0.33%	3,418	0.72%	80,543	0.72%
Valid Votes	56,077	93.46%	475,047	94.28%	11,140,333	95.35%
Rejected Votes	3,888	6.48%	28,462	5.65%	516,926	4.42%
Total Polled	60,000	71.92%	503,845	79.13%	11,684,111	77.66%
Registered Electors	83,431		636,733		15,044,490	

=== 2010 Sri Lankan Parliamentary Election ===
Party	Kekirawa		Anuradhapura Electoral District		Sri Lanka	
Party	Votes	%	Votes	%	Votes	%
UPFA	17,029	43.09%	221,204	66.52%	4,846,388	60.38%
UNP	10,850	27.46%	80,360	24.17%	2,357,057	29.37%
SMBP	10,121	25.61%	11,445	3.44%	12,166	0.15%
DNA	1,298	3.28%	18,129	5.45%	441,251	5.50%
Other Parties (with < 1%)	220	0.56%	1,400	0.42%	18,658	0.23%
Valid Votes	39,518	92.05%	332,538	93.55%	8,026,322	96.03%
Rejected Votes	3,412	7.95%	22,930	6.45%	581,465	6.96%
Total Polled	42,930	58.10%	355,468	57.35%	8,358,246	59.29%
Registered Electors	73,885		619,845		14,097,690	

=== 2004 Sri Lankan Parliamentary Election ===
Party	Kekirawa		Anuradhapura Electoral District		Sri Lanka	
Party	Votes	%	Votes	%	Votes	%
UPFA	24,446	53.67%	212,943	57.22%	4,223,126	45.70%
UNP	19,606	43.05%	148,612	39.94%	3,486,792	37.73%
JHU	1,165	2.56%	8,034	2.16%	552,723	5.98%
Other Parties (with < 1%)	329	0.72%	2,536	0.68%	51,070	0.55%
Valid Votes	45,546	94.35%	372,125	94.59%	9,241,931	94.52%
Rejected Votes	2,725	5.65%	21,281	5.41%	534,452	5.47%
Total Polled	48,271	73.10%	393,406	76.52%	9,777,821	75.74%
Registered Electors	66,036		514,149		12,909,631	

=== 2001 Sri Lankan Parliamentary Election ===
Party	Kekirawa		Anuradhapura Electoral District		Sri Lanka	
Party	Votes	%	Votes	%	Votes	%
UNP	22,853	51.61%	165,055	45.93%	4,086,026	45.62%
PA	17,088	38.59%	149,393	41.57%	3,330,815	37.19%
JVP	3,754	8.48%	40,005	11.13%	815,353	9.10%
Other Parties (with < 1%)	581	1.31%	4,891	1.36%	108,710	1.21%
Valid Votes	44,276	94.41%	359,344	94.78%	8,955,844	94.77%
Rejected Votes	2,621	5.59%	19,796	5.22%	494,009	5.23%
Total Polled	46,897	75.03%	379,140	77.41%	9,449,878	76.03%
Registered Electors	62,502		489,776		12,428,762	

=== 2000 Sri Lankan Parliamentary Election ===
Party	Kekirawa		Anuradhapura Electoral District		Sri Lanka	
Party	Votes	%	Votes	%	Votes	%
PA	20,480	46.37%	169,424	48.30%	3,899,329	45.33%
UNP	19,578	44.33%	144,662	41.24%	3,451,765	40.12%
JVP	1,738	3.93%	21,274	6.06%	518,725	6.03%
NUA	1,665	3.77%	9,369	2.67%	185,593	2.16%
Other Parties (with < 1%)	708	1.60%	6,042	1.72%	245,927	2.86%
Valid Votes	44,169	N/A	350,771	N/A	8,602,617	N/A

=== 1994 Sri Lankan Parliamentary Election ===
Party	Kekirawa		Anuradhapura Electoral District		Sri Lanka	
Party	Votes	%	Votes	%	Votes	%
PA	20,987	52.11%	180,454	55.19%	3,887,805	48.94%
UNP	18,886	46.89%	142,084	43.45%	3,498,370	44.04%
Other Parties (with < 1%)	400	0.99%	4,446	1.36%	158,616	2.00%
Valid Votes	40,273	95.32%	326,984	95.72%	7,943,688	95.20%
Rejected Votes	1,976	4.68%	14,620	4.28%	400,395	4.80%
Total Polled	42,249	82.89%	341,604	81.54%	8,344,095	74.75%
Registered Electors	50,969		418,959		11,163,064	

=== 1989 Sri Lankan Parliamentary Election ===
Party	Kekirawa		Anuradhapura Electoral District		Sri Lanka	
Party	Votes	%	Votes	%	Votes	%
UNP	14,020	52.39%	92,726	56.39%	2,838,005	50.71%
SLFP	11,670	43.61%	64,010	38.92%	1,785,369	31.90%
IND	765	2.86%	4,057	2.47%	12,285	0.22%
Other Parties (with < 1%)	304	1.14%	3,652	2.22%	300,186	5.36%
Valid Votes	26,759	92.03%	164,445	92.03%	5,596,468	93.87%
Rejected Votes	2,316	7.97%	14,245	7.97%	365,563	6.13%
Total Polled	29,075	71.60%	178,690	53.49%	5,962,031	63.60%
Registered Electors	40,606		334,073		9,374,164	

== Demographics ==
=== Ethnicity ===
The Kekirawa Polling Division has a Sinhalese majority (83.7%) and a significant Moor population (14.4%) . In comparison, the Anuradhapura Electoral District (which contains the Kekirawa Polling Division) has a Sinhalese majority (91.0%)

Ethnicity in Kekirawa
1. Sinhalese (83.7%)
2. Moor (14.4%)
3. Sri Lankan Tamil (1.60%)
4. Other (0.20%)

=== Religion ===
The Kekirawa Polling Division has a Buddhist majority (83.0%) and a significant Muslim population (14.6%) . In comparison, the Anuradhapura Electoral District (which contains the Kekirawa Polling Division) has a Buddhist majority (90.1%)

Religion in Kekirawa
1. Buddhist (83.0%)
2. Muslim (14.6%)
3. Hindu (1.30%)
4. Other (1.10%)
