= Anuradhapura West Polling Division =

Anuradhapura West
- Polling Division
- Coordinates: 8.418383°N 80.159689°E
- Country: Sri Lanka
- Province: North Central Province, Sri Lanka
- Electoral District: Anuradhapura Electoral District

Area
  - Total: 1,553.29 km^{2} (599.73 sq mi)

Population (2012)
  - Total: 72,353
  - Density: 47/km^{2} (120/sq mi)
- ISO 3166 code: EC-17D

The Anuradhapura West Polling Division is a Polling Division in the Anuradhapura Electoral District, in the North Central Province, Sri Lanka.

== Presidential Election Results ==
=== Summary ===
The winner of Anuradhapura West has matched the final country result 6 out of 8 times. Hence, Anuradhapura West is a Weak Bellwether for Presidential Elections.

Year	Anuradhapura West	Anuradhapura Electoral District	MAE %	Sri Lanka	MAE %
2019	SLPP	SLPP	0.37%	SLPP	6.56%
2015	UPFA	UPFA	1.47%	NDF	7.33%
2010	UPFA	UPFA	1.21%	UPFA	7.00%
2005	UPFA	UPFA	4.29%	UPFA	0.46%
1999	PA	PA	4.61%	PA	1.83%
1994	PA	PA	5.91%	PA	4.27%
1988	SLFP	SLFP	4.96%	UNP	3.66%
1982	UNP	UNP	2.24%	UNP	1.32%
Matches/Mean MAE	6/8	6/8	3.13%	8/8	4.05%

=== 2019 Sri Lankan Presidential Election ===
Party	Anuradhapura West		Anuradhapura Electoral District		Sri Lanka	
Party	Votes	%	Votes	%	Votes	%
SLPP	51,091	59.35%	342,223	58.97%	6,924,255	52.25%
NDF	30,301	35.20%	202,348	34.87%	5,564,239	41.99%
NMPP	2,789	3.24%	22,879	3.94%	418,553	3.16%
Other Parties (with < 1%)	1,909	2.22%	12,896	2.22%	345,452	2.61%
Valid Votes	86,090	99.21%	580,346	99.16%	13,252,499	98.99%
Rejected Votes	683	0.79%	4,916	0.84%	135,452	1.01%
Total Polled	86,773	84.49%	585,262	85.76%	13,387,951	83.71%
Registered Electors	102,705		682,450		15,992,568	

=== 2015 Sri Lankan Presidential Election ===
Party	Anuradhapura West		Anuradhapura Electoral District		Sri Lanka	
Party	Votes	%	Votes	%	Votes	%
UPFA	42,349	55.03%	281,161	53.59%	5,768,090	47.58%
NDF	33,791	43.91%	238,407	45.44%	6,217,162	51.28%
Other Parties (with < 1%)	817	1.06%	5,065	0.97%	138,200	1.14%
Valid Votes	76,957	99.07%	524,633	99.15%	12,123,452	98.85%
Rejected Votes	720	0.93%	4,500	0.85%	140,925	1.15%
Total Polled	77,677	75.64%	529,133	77.71%	12,264,377	78.69%
Registered Electors	102,691		680,877		15,585,942	

=== 2010 Sri Lankan Presidential Election ===
Party	Anuradhapura West		Anuradhapura Electoral District		Sri Lanka	
Party	Votes	%	Votes	%	Votes	%
UPFA	41,965	64.99%	298,448	66.32%	6,015,934	57.88%
NDF	21,288	32.97%	143,761	31.94%	4,173,185	40.15%
Other Parties (with < 1%)	1,322	2.05%	7,829	1.74%	204,494	1.97%
Valid Votes	64,575	99.11%	450,038	99.17%	10,393,613	99.03%
Rejected Votes	583	0.89%	3,785	0.83%	101,838	0.97%
Total Polled	65,158	69.66%	453,823	73.65%	10,495,451	66.70%
Registered Electors	93,534		616,186		15,734,587	

=== 2005 Sri Lankan Presidential Election ===
Party	Anuradhapura West		Anuradhapura Electoral District		Sri Lanka	
Party	Votes	%	Votes	%	Votes	%
UPFA	31,575	50.61%	231,040	55.08%	4,887,152	50.29%
UNP	29,829	47.82%	182,956	43.62%	4,706,366	48.43%
Other Parties (with < 1%)	980	1.57%	5,438	1.30%	123,521	1.27%
Valid Votes	62,384	98.94%	419,434	98.92%	9,717,039	98.88%
Rejected Votes	671	1.06%	4,563	1.08%	109,869	1.12%
Total Polled	63,055	72.95%	423,997	75.41%	9,826,908	69.51%
Registered Electors	86,433		562,259		14,136,979	

=== 1999 Sri Lankan Presidential Election ===
Party	Anuradhapura West		Anuradhapura Electoral District		Sri Lanka	
Party	Votes	%	Votes	%	Votes	%
PA	25,850	49.31%	189,073	54.14%	4,312,157	51.12%
UNP	23,492	44.81%	139,180	39.86%	3,602,748	42.71%
JVP	2,015	3.84%	14,612	4.18%	343,927	4.08%
Other Parties (with < 1%)	1,063	2.03%	6,336	1.81%	176,679	2.09%
Valid Votes	52,420	98.14%	349,201	98.05%	8,435,754	97.69%
Rejected Votes	991	1.86%	6,949	1.95%	199,536	2.31%
Total Polled	53,411	72.62%	356,150	75.63%	8,635,290	72.17%
Registered Electors	73,549		470,907		11,965,536	

=== 1994 Sri Lankan Presidential Election ===
Party	Anuradhapura West		Anuradhapura Electoral District		Sri Lanka	
Party	Votes	%	Votes	%	Votes	%
PA	27,142	58.00%	200,146	63.99%	4,709,205	62.28%
UNP	18,892	40.37%	107,342	34.32%	2,715,283	35.91%
Other Parties (with < 1%)	760	1.62%	5,309	1.70%	137,040	1.81%
Valid Votes	46,794	97.67%	312,797	98.05%	7,561,526	98.03%
Rejected Votes	1,115	2.33%	6,205	1.95%	151,706	1.97%
Total Polled	47,909	73.29%	319,002	76.16%	7,713,232	69.12%
Registered Electors	65,367		418,857		11,158,880	

=== 1988 Sri Lankan Presidential Election ===
Party	Anuradhapura West		Anuradhapura Electoral District		Sri Lanka	
Party	Votes	%	Votes	%	Votes	%
SLFP	15,492	50.29%	73,154	55.15%	2,289,857	44.95%
UNP	14,857	48.23%	56,951	42.94%	2,569,199	50.43%
SLMP	457	1.48%	2,529	1.91%	235,701	4.63%
Valid Votes	30,806	98.63%	132,634	98.36%	5,094,754	98.24%
Rejected Votes	428	1.37%	2,207	1.64%	91,499	1.76%
Total Polled	31,234	59.44%	134,841	40.18%	5,186,256	55.87%
Registered Electors	52,547		335,551		9,283,143	

=== 1982 Sri Lankan Presidential Election ===
Party	Anuradhapura West		Anuradhapura Electoral District		Sri Lanka	
Party	Votes	%	Votes	%	Votes	%
UNP	18,894	52.96%	117,873	49.84%	3,450,815	52.93%
SLFP	15,054	42.19%	102,973	43.54%	2,546,348	39.05%
JVP	1,486	4.17%	13,911	5.88%	273,428	4.19%
Other Parties (with < 1%)	244	0.68%	1,766	0.75%	249,460	3.83%
Valid Votes	35,678	99.31%	236,523	99.04%	6,520,156	98.78%
Rejected Votes	249	0.69%	2,294	0.96%	80,470	1.22%
Total Polled	35,927	84.72%	238,817	84.68%	6,600,626	80.15%
Registered Electors	42,409		282,018		8,235,358	

== Parliamentary Election Results ==
=== Summary ===
The winner of Anuradhapura West has matched the final country result 4 out of 7 times. Hence, Anuradhapura West is a Weak Bellwether for Parliamentary Elections.

Year	Anuradhapura West	Anuradhapura Electoral District	MAE %	Sri Lanka	MAE %
2015	UPFA	UPFA	1.23%	UNP	4.01%
2010	UPFA	UPFA	2.19%	UPFA	6.79%
2004	UPFA	UPFA	4.02%	UPFA	5.86%
2001	UNP	UNP	3.66%	UNP	2.87%
2000	UNP	PA	4.47%	PA	3.39%
1994	UNP	PA	6.03%	PA	2.52%
1989	UNP	UNP	3.69%	UNP	6.27%
Matches/Mean MAE	4/7	6/7	3.61%	7/7	4.53%

=== 2015 Sri Lankan Parliamentary Election ===
Party	Anuradhapura West		Anuradhapura Electoral District		Sri Lanka	
Party	Votes	%	Votes	%	Votes	%
UPFA	35,082	50.04%	229,856	48.39%	4,732,664	42.48%
UNP	30,873	44.04%	213,072	44.85%	5,098,916	45.77%
JVP	3,542	5.05%	28,701	6.04%	544,154	4.88%
Other Parties (with < 1%)	613	0.87%	3,418	0.72%	80,543	0.72%
Valid Votes	70,110	93.78%	475,047	94.28%	11,140,333	95.35%
Rejected Votes	4,593	6.14%	28,462	5.65%	516,926	4.42%
Total Polled	74,757	72.80%	503,845	79.13%	11,684,111	77.66%
Registered Electors	102,691		636,733		15,044,490	

=== 2010 Sri Lankan Parliamentary Election ===
Party	Anuradhapura West		Anuradhapura Electoral District		Sri Lanka	
Party	Votes	%	Votes	%	Votes	%
UPFA	31,803	69.40%	221,204	66.52%	4,846,388	60.38%
UNP	11,370	24.81%	80,360	24.17%	2,357,057	29.37%
DNA	2,436	5.32%	18,129	5.45%	441,251	5.50%
Other Parties (with < 1%)	218	0.48%	12,845	3.86%	30,824	0.38%
Valid Votes	45,827	92.65%	332,538	93.55%	8,026,322	96.03%
Rejected Votes	3,636	7.35%	22,930	6.45%	581,465	6.96%
Total Polled	49,463	52.88%	355,468	57.35%	8,358,246	59.29%
Registered Electors	93,534		619,845		14,097,690	

=== 2004 Sri Lankan Parliamentary Election ===
Party	Anuradhapura West		Anuradhapura Electoral District		Sri Lanka	
Party	Votes	%	Votes	%	Votes	%
UPFA	28,821	52.96%	212,943	57.22%	4,223,126	45.70%
UNP	23,876	43.87%	148,612	39.94%	3,486,792	37.73%
JHU	1,260	2.32%	8,034	2.16%	552,723	5.98%
Other Parties (with < 1%)	464	0.85%	2,536	0.68%	51,070	0.55%
Valid Votes	54,421	94.12%	372,125	94.59%	9,241,931	94.52%
Rejected Votes	3,401	5.88%	21,281	5.41%	534,452	5.47%
Total Polled	57,822	71.00%	393,406	76.52%	9,777,821	75.74%
Registered Electors	81,435		514,149		12,909,631	

=== 2001 Sri Lankan Parliamentary Election ===
Party	Anuradhapura West		Anuradhapura Electoral District		Sri Lanka	
Party	Votes	%	Votes	%	Votes	%
UNP	27,308	50.74%	165,055	45.93%	4,086,026	45.62%
PA	20,766	38.58%	149,393	41.57%	3,330,815	37.19%
JVP	5,003	9.30%	40,005	11.13%	815,353	9.10%
Other Parties (with < 1%)	747	1.39%	4,891	1.36%	108,710	1.21%
Valid Votes	53,824	94.73%	359,344	94.78%	8,955,844	94.77%
Rejected Votes	2,994	5.27%	19,796	5.22%	494,009	5.23%
Total Polled	56,818	72.74%	379,140	77.41%	9,449,878	76.03%
Registered Electors	78,106		489,776		12,428,762	

=== 2000 Sri Lankan Parliamentary Election ===
Party	Anuradhapura West		Anuradhapura Electoral District		Sri Lanka	
Party	Votes	%	Votes	%	Votes	%
UNP	24,330	46.96%	144,662	41.24%	3,451,765	40.12%
PA	22,829	44.07%	169,424	48.30%	3,899,329	45.33%
JVP	2,715	5.24%	21,274	6.06%	518,725	6.03%
NUA	1,093	2.11%	9,369	2.67%	185,593	2.16%
Other Parties (with < 1%)	838	1.62%	6,042	1.72%	245,927	2.86%
Valid Votes	51,805	N/A	350,771	N/A	8,602,617	N/A

=== 1994 Sri Lankan Parliamentary Election ===
Party	Anuradhapura West		Anuradhapura Electoral District		Sri Lanka	
Party	Votes	%	Votes	%	Votes	%
UNP	24,548	49.58%	142,084	43.45%	3,498,370	44.04%
PA	24,306	49.09%	180,454	55.19%	3,887,805	48.94%
SLPF	505	1.02%	3,077	0.94%	90,078	1.13%
Other Parties (with < 1%)	151	0.30%	1,369	0.42%	68,538	0.86%
Valid Votes	49,510	95.35%	326,984	95.72%	7,943,688	95.20%
Rejected Votes	2,415	4.65%	14,620	4.28%	400,395	4.80%
Total Polled	51,925	79.44%	341,604	81.54%	8,344,095	74.75%
Registered Electors	65,367		418,959		11,163,064	

=== 1989 Sri Lankan Parliamentary Election ===
Party	Anuradhapura West		Anuradhapura Electoral District		Sri Lanka	
Party	Votes	%	Votes	%	Votes	%
UNP	19,461	60.61%	92,726	56.39%	2,838,005	50.71%
SLFP	11,437	35.62%	64,010	38.92%	1,785,369	31.90%
IND	499	1.55%	4,057	2.47%	12,285	0.22%
Other Parties (with < 1%)	384	1.20%	2,255	1.37%	232,463	4.15%
ELJP	329	1.02%	1,397	0.85%	67,723	1.21%
Valid Votes	32,110	91.39%	164,445	92.03%	5,596,468	93.87%
Rejected Votes	3,024	8.61%	14,245	7.97%	365,563	6.13%
Total Polled	35,134	68.21%	178,690	53.49%	5,962,031	63.60%
Registered Electors	51,510		334,073		9,374,164	

== Demographics ==
=== Ethnicity ===
The Anuradhapura West Polling Division has a Sinhalese majority (96.8%) . In comparison, the Anuradhapura Electoral District (which contains the Anuradhapura West Polling Division) has a Sinhalese majority (91.0%)

Ethnicity in Anuradhapura West
1. Sinhalese (96.8%)
2. Moor (2.70%)
3. Other (0.50%)

=== Religion ===
The Anuradhapura West Polling Division has a Buddhist majority (95.5%) . In comparison, the Anuradhapura Electoral District (which contains the Anuradhapura West Polling Division) has a Buddhist majority (90.1%)

Religion in Anuradhapura West
1. Buddhist (95.5%)
2. Muslim (2.80%)
3. Roman Catholic (1.10%)
4. Other (0.60%)
