= Chandrani Bandara Jayasinghe =

Sri Lankan politician

Hon. Chandrani Bandara Jayasinghe MP

Minister of Women and Child Affairs
- In office 12 January 2015 – 18 November 2019
- President: Maithripala Sirisena
- Prime Minister: Ranil Wickremesinghe
- Preceded by: Tissa Karalliyadde

Member of Parliament for Anuradhapura District
- In office 2000–2020

Personal details
- Born: July 24, 1962 (age 63)
- Party: Samagi Jana Balawegaya

Chandrani Bandara Jayasinghe (born July 24, 1962) is a Sri Lankan politician and a former member of the Parliament of Sri Lanka.
