= Wasantha Samarasinghe =

Sri Lankan politician, trade union leader, and activist

Hon. Wasantha Samarasinghe MP
- වසන්ත සමරසිංහ வசந்த சமரசிங்க

Minister of Trade, Commerce, Food Security and Cooperative Development
- Incumbent
- Assumed office 18 November 2024
- President: Anura Kumara Dissanayake
- Prime Minister: Harini Amarasuriya
- Preceded by: Harini Amarasuriya

Member of Parliament for Anuradhapura District
- Incumbent
- Assumed office 21 November 2024
- Majority: 251,639 Preferential votes

Member of Parliament for National List
- In office 22 April 2004 – 30 June 2008
- Succeeded by: Vinayagamoorthy Muralitharan

Personal details
- Born: 24 May 1976 (age 50)
- Party: Janatha Vimukthi Peramuna
- Other political affiliations: National People's Power
- Education: University of Kelaniya
- Website: wasanthasamarasinghe.com

Wasantha Samarasinghe is a Sri Lankan politician, trade union leader, and activist. He currently serves as the Minister of Trade, Commerce, Food Security and Cooperative Development and is a Member of Parliament from the Anuradhapura District as a member of the National People's Power (NPP).

Samarasinghe is known for his involvement in student politics, parliamentary representation, and labour movement advocacy.

== Early life and education ==
Samarasinghe completed his Advanced Level studies at Thambuththegama Central College before entering the University of Kelaniya in 1996. He graduated with a special degree in Business Management Accounting.

During his university years, Samarasinghe was a student leader who served as Chairman of the Kelaniya University Student Union, and was also a prominent leader in the Inter-University Student Power Council.

== Trade union activism ==
Samarasinghe is active in Sri Lanka's trade union movement, and has served as the Chairman of the Inter-Company Employees' Union and the National Organizer at the National Trade Union Center.

== Political career ==
In 2004, Samarasinghe was appointed to the Parliament of Sri Lanka as a National List MP representing the Janatha Vimukthi Peramuna (JVP). During his tenure, he was an active member of the Parliamentary Accounts Committee. He also served as a member of the North Central Provincial Council.

In 2024, Samarasinghe was re-elected to Parliament, securing the highest number of preferential votes from the Anuradhapura District.

Samarasinghe is the convener of the Anti-Corruption Voice Organization, an anti-corruption organization focused on exposing corruption in government administrations.
