= Anuradhapura Electoral District =

Electoral district in Sri Lanka

Anuradhapura
- Electoral District for the Parliament of Sri Lanka
- Administrative District: Anuradhapura
- Province: North Central
- Polling divisions: 7
- Population: 809,000 (2008)
- Electorate: 579,261 (2010)
- Area: 7,179 km^{2} (2,772 sq mi)

Current Electoral District
- Number of members: 9
- MPs: NPP (7) Wasantha Samarasinghe; Sena Nanayakkara; Susil Ranasinghe; Susantha Kumara; Bhagya Sri Herath; P. D. N. K. Palihena; Thilina Samarakoon SJB (2) Rohana Bandara; Suranga Rathnayaka

Anuradhapura electoral district is one of the 22 multi-member electoral districts of Sri Lanka created by the 1978 Constitution of Sri Lanka. The district is conterminous with the administrative district of Anuradhapura in the North Central province. The district currently elects 9 of the 225 members of the Sri Lankan Parliament and had 579,261 registered electors in 2010. The district is Sri Lanka's Electorate Number 17.

== Polling Divisions ==
The Anuradhapura Electoral District consists of the following polling divisions:

A: Medawachchiya

B: Horowpothana

C: Anuradhapura East

D: Anuradhapura West

E: Kalawewa

F: Mihintale

G: Kekirawa

== 1982 Presidential Election ==
Results of the 1st presidential election held on 20 October 1982 for the district:

Candidate	Party	Votes per Polling Division							Postal Votes	Total Votes	%
Candidate	Party	Anura- dhapura East	Anura- dhapura West	Horow- patana	Kala- wewa	Keki- rawa	Medawa- chchiya	Mihin -tale	Postal Votes	Total Votes	%
Junius Jayewardene	UNP	15,856	18,894	15,259	22,467	15,454	16,590	11,300	2,053	117,873	49.84%
Hector Kobbekaduwa	SLFP	14,944	15,054	13,029	20,442	12,281	15,079	10,965	1,179	102,973	43.54%
Rohana Wijeweera	JVP	1,891	1,486	2,719	2,410	733	2,749	1,813	110	13,911	5.88%
Colvin R. de Silva	LSSP	187	172	166	180	98	144	180	21	1,148	0.49%
Vasudeva Nanayakkara	NSSP	59	40	29	147	31	52	30	8	396	0.17%
Kumar Ponnambalam	ACTC	45	32	32	32	13	31	34	3	222	0.09%
Valid Votes		32,982	35,678	31,234	45,678	28,610	34,645	24,322	3,374	236,523	100.00%
Rejected Votes		366	249	347	474	209	350	249	50	2,294	
Total Polled		33,348	35,927	31,581	46,152	28,819	34,995	24,571	3,424	238,817	
Registered Electors		41,615	42,409	36,657	54,762	32,927	41,463	28,761		278,594	
Turnout		80.13%	84.72%	86.15%	84.28%	87.52%	84.40%	85.43%		85.72%	

== 1988 Presidential Election ==
Results of the 2nd presidential election held on 19 December 1988 for the district:

Candidate	Party	Votes per Polling Division							Postal Votes	Total Votes	%
Candidate	Party	Anura- dhapura East	Anura- dhapura West	Horow- patana	Kala- wewa	Keki- rawa	Medawa- chchiya	Mihin -tale	Postal Votes	Total Votes	%
Sirimavo Bandaranaike	SLFP	11,516	15,492	7,038	14,637	7,203	12,542	4,018	708	73,154	55.15%
Ranasinghe Premadasa	UNP	10,310	14,857	4,023	8,947	5,683	8,367	4,027	737	56,951	42.94%
Oswin Abeygunasekara	SLMP	617	457	112	611	191	371	138	32	2,529	1.91%
Valid Votes		22,443	30,806	11,173	24,195	13,077	21,280	8,183	1,477	132,634	100.00%
Rejected Votes		371	428	244	365	129	459	211	0	2,207	
Total Polled		22,814	31,234	11,417	24,560	13,206	21,739	8,394	1,477	134,841	
Registered Electors		50,340	52,547	42,773	65,945	41,013	47,805	33,651		334,074	
Turnout		45.32%	59.44%	26.69%	37.24%	32.20%	45.47%	24.94%		40.36%	

== 1989 Parliamentary General Election ==
Results of the 9th parliamentary election held on 15 February 1989 for the district:

Party	Votes per Polling Division							Postal Votes	Total Votes	%	Seats
Party	Anura- dhapura East	Anura- dhapura West	Horow- patana	Kala- wewa	Keki- rawa	Medawa- chchiya	Mihin -tale	Postal Votes	Total Votes	%	Seats
United National Party	10,763	19,461	10,563	14,940	14,020	15,324	4,961	2,694	92,726	56.39%	5
Sri Lanka Freedom Party	6,552	11,437	7,275	14,522	11,670	7,228	3,786	1,540	64,010	38.92%	3
Independent	140	499	464	404	765	556	1,217	12	4,057	2.47%	0
United Socialist Alliance (CPSL, LSSP, NSSP, SLMP)	376	274	134	438	150	183	112	57	1,724	1.05%	0
United Lanka People's Party	201	329	67	333	97	228	89	53	1,397	0.85%	0
Mahajana Eksath Peramuna	50	110	37	79	57	116	37	45	531	0.32%	0
Valid Votes	18,082	32,110	18,540	30,716	26,759	23,635	10,202	4,401	164,445	100.00%	8
Rejected Votes	1,309	3,024	1,121	3,557	2,316	1,505	1,238	175	14,245		
Total Polled	19,391	35,134	19,661	34,273	29,075	25,140	11,440	4,576	178,690		
Registered Electors	49,059	51,510	42,195	65,472	40,606	46,968	33,289	4,974	334,073		
Turnout	39.53%	68.21%	46.60%	52.35%	71.60%	53.53%	34.37%	92.00%	53.49%		

The following candidates were elected: Dissanayake Mudiyanselage Ariyadasa (UNP), 27,724 preference votes (pv); Adhikari Mudiyanselage Sompala Adhikari (UNP), 25,617 pv; Kulathunga Dissanayake Mudiyanselage Chandrasoma Bandara (UNP), 25,541 pv; Janak Mahendra Adhikari (SLFP), 22,568 pv; Themiya Loku Bandara Hurulle (UNP), 20,392 pv; Lal Dharmapriya Gamage (UNP), 20,189 pv; Kiri Banda Ratnayake (SLFP), 18,040 pv; and Berty Premalal Dissanayake (SLFP), 16,200 pv.

== 1993 Provincial Council Election ==
Results of the 2nd North Central provincial council election held on 17 May 1993 for the district:

Party	Votes	%	Seats
United National Party	146,252		
People's Alliance (SLFP et al.)	98,901		
Democratic United National Front	29,772		
Sri Lanka Muslim Congress	5,006		
Nava Sama Samaja Party	1,982		
Valid Votes			
Rejected Votes			
Total Polled			
Registered Electors			
Turnout			

== 1994 Parliamentary General Election ==
Results of the 10th parliamentary election held on 16 August 1994 for the district:

Party	Votes per Polling Division							Postal Votes	Total Votes	%	Seats
Party	Anura- dhapura East	Anura- dhapura West	Horow- patana	Kala- wewa	Keki- rawa	Medawa- chchiya	Mihin -tale	Postal Votes	Total Votes	%	Seats
People's Alliance (SLFP et al.)	25,277	24,306	22,825	37,744	20,987	25,041	17,881	6,393	180,454	55.19%	5
United National Party	19,949	24,548	17,966	25,091	18,886	17,389	13,762	4,493	142,084	43.45%	3
Sri Lanka Progressive Front (JVP)	849	505	234	483	252	336	290	128	3,077	0.94%	0
Mahajana Eksath Peramuna	285	151	73	284	148	213	127	88	1,369	0.42%	0
Valid Votes	46,360	49,510	41,098	63,602	40,273	42,979	32,060	11,102	326,984	100.00%	8
Rejected Votes	1,878	2,415	1,552	3,160	1,976	1,746	1,673	220	14,620		
Total Polled	48,238	51,925	42,650	66,762	42,249	44,725	33,733	11,322	341,604		
Registered Electors	62,048	65,367	51,975	79,687	50,969	55,792	41,088		406,926		
Turnout	77.74%	79.44%	82.06%	83.78%	82.89%	80.16%	82.10%		83.95%		

The following candidates were elected: Berty Premalal Dissanayake (PA), 78,792 preference votes (pv); Kulathunga Dissanayake Mudiyanselage Chandrasoma Bandara (UNP), 66,538 pv; Punchi Banda Dissanayake (PA), 46,756 pv; Appuhamige Herath Banda Semasinghe (PA), 45,256 pv; Tissa Karalliyadde (PA), 44,849 pv; Adhikari Mudiyanselage Sompala Adhikari (UNP), 44,650 pv; Don Siman Ralalage Shantha Premarathna (PA), 43,167 pv; and P. Harrison (UNP), 34,666 pv.

== 1994 Presidential Election ==
Results of the 3rd presidential election held on 9 November 1994 for the district:

Candidate	Party	Votes per Polling Division							Postal Votes	Total Votes	%
Candidate	Party	Anura- dhapura East	Anura- dhapura West	Horow- patana	Kala- wewa	Keki- rawa	Medawa- chchiya	Mihin -tale	Postal Votes	Total Votes	%
Chandrika Kumaratunga	PA	27,421	27,142	26,000	42,661	23,583	25,938	19,935	7,466	200,146	63.99%
Srimathi Dissanayake	UNP	15,490	18,892	13,287	17,331	14,517	13,185	10,541	4,099	107,342	34.32%
Hudson Samarasinghe	Ind 2	310	365	297	547	324	401	267	23	2,534	0.81%
Nihal Galappaththi	SLPF	134	141	136	258	95	182	97	40	1,083	0.35%
Harischandra Wijayatunga	SMBP	220	141	80	191	110	126	86	60	1,014	0.32%
A.J. Ranashinge	Ind 1	102	113	86	112	75	106	66	18	678	0.22%
Valid Votes		43,677	46,794	39,886	61,100	38,704	39,938	30,992	11,706	312,797	100.00%
Rejected Votes		943	1,115	581	1,304	789	667	581	225	6,205	
Total Polled		44,620	47,909	40,467	62,404	39,493	40,605	31,573	11,931	319,002	
Registered Electors		62,048	65,367	51,975	79,687	50,969	55,792	41,088		406,926	
Turnout		71.91%	73.29%	77.86%	78.31%	77.48%	72.78%	76.84%		78.39%	

== 1999 Provincial Council Election ==
Results of the 3rd North Central provincial council election held on 6 April 1999 for the district:

Party	Votes	%	Seats
People's Alliance (SLFP, SLMC et al.)	156,291	54.09%	
United National Party	111,285	38.51%	
Janatha Vimukthi Peramuna	14,197	4.91%	
New Left Front (NSSP et al.)	4,259	1.47%	
Mahajana Eksath Peramuna	1,150	0.40%	
Independent	861	0.30%	
Muslim United Liberation Front	798	0.28%	
Sri Lanka Progressive Front	131	0.05%	
Valid Votes	288,972	100.00%	
Rejected Votes	22,153		
Total Polled	311,125		
Registered Electors	448,098		
Turnout	69.43%		

== 1999 Presidential Election ==
Results of the 4th presidential election held on 21 December 1999 for the district:

Candidate	Party	Votes per Polling Division							Postal Votes	Total Votes	%
Candidate	Party	Anura- dhapura East	Anura- dhapura West	Horow- patana	Kala- wewa	Keki- rawa	Medawa- chchiya	Mihin -tale	Postal Votes	Total Votes	%
Chandrika Kumaratunga	PA	25,187	25,850	23,075	42,154	23,631	24,878	18,131	6,167	189,073	54.14%
Ranil Wickremasinghe	UNP	20,153	23,492	17,732	23,388	19,151	16,742	14,393	4,129	139,180	39.86%
Nandana Gunathilake	JVP	2,996	2,015	1,579	2,845	1,144	1,875	1,508	650	14,612	4.18%
W.V.M. Ranjith	Ind 2	127	177	170	248	141	180	131	2	1,176	0.34%
Rajiva Wijesinha	Liberal	103	166	137	227	146	142	136	8	1,065	0.30%
T. Edirisuriya	Ind 1	105	157	94	242	121	138	102	4	963	0.28%
Harischandra Wijayatunga	SMBP	174	150	69	187	87	98	77	60	902	0.26%
Abdul Rasool	SLMP	98	166	76	89	97	67	72	5	670	0.19%
Kamal Karunadasa	PLSF	63	129	65	138	64	92	43	6	600	0.17%
Vasudeva Nanayakkara	LDA	77	33	29	119	44	30	31	31	394	0.11%
Hudson Samarasinghe	Ind 3	25	44	25	63	36	41	32	5	271	0.08%
A. Dissanayaka	DUNF	19	21	21	36	26	15	21	7	166	0.05%
A.W. Premawardhana	PFF	7	20	15	29	16	25	16	1	129	0.04%
Valid Votes		49,134	52,420	43,087	69,765	44,704	44,323	34,693	11,075	349,201	100.00%
Rejected Votes		1,015	991	690	1,503	964	745	743	298	6,949	
Total Polled		50,149	53,411	43,777	71,268	45,668	45,068	35,436	11,373	356,150	
Registered Electors		69,006	73,549	58,774	90,631	58,684	62,120	46,770		459,534	
Turnout		72.67%	72.62%	74.48%	78.64%	77.82%	72.55%	75.77%		77.50%	

== 2000 Parliamentary General Election ==
Results of the 11th parliamentary election held on 10 October 2000 for the district:

Party	Votes per Polling Division							Postal Votes	Total Votes	%	Seats
Party	Anura- dhapura East	Anura- dhapura West	Horow- patana	Kala- wewa	Keki- rawa	Medawa- chchiya	Mihin -tale	Postal Votes	Total Votes	%	Seats
People's Alliance (SLFP et al.)	23,078	22,829	19,196	35,026	20,480	23,108	16,577	9,130	169,424	48.33%	5
United National Party	20,825	24,330	18,084	24,754	19,578	16,896	13,850	6,345	144,662	41.26%	3
Janatha Vimukthi Peramuna	4,587	2,715	2,295	4,303	1,738	2,255	2,208	1,173	21,274	6.07%	0
National Unity Alliance (SLMC)	567	1,093	2,885	834	1,665	701	1,375	249	9,369	2.67%	0
New Left Front (NSSP et al.)	323	318	256	539	332	380	252	61	2,461	0.70%	0
Sinhala Heritage	307	110	73	170	98	69	68	81	976	0.28%	0
Citizen's Front	154	152	60	208	74	115	72	19	854	0.24%	0
United Sinhala Great Council	57	91	56	98	68	69	50	5	494	0.14%	0
Democratic United National Front	28	35	16	32	28	29	17	9	194	0.06%	0
Sinhalaye Mahasammatha Bhoomiputra Pakshaya	38	29	15	33	17	25	12	23	192	0.05%	0
Liberal Party	27	18	13	27	20	30	13	2	150	0.04%	0
National People's Party	22	19	25	20	15	18	17	6	142	0.04%	0
Independent 2	10	25	25	21	19	20	11	1	132	0.04%	0
Independent 1	12	18	11	17	13	17	13	2	103	0.03%	0
Sri Lanka Progressive Front	10	17	20	15	15	6	16	3	102	0.03%	0
People's Freedom Front	9	6	5	13	9	6	3	2	53	0.02%	0
Valid Votes	50,054	51,805	43,035	66,110	44,169	43,744	34,554	17,111	350,582	100.00%	8
Rejected Votes	2,526	3,224	2,387		2,574	2,265	2,192		20,561		
Total Polled	52,580	55,029	45,422		46,743	46,009	36,746		371,143		
Registered Electors	70,735	75,498	60,605	93,423	60,379	63,651	48,370		472,661		
Turnout	74.33%	72.89%	74.95%		77.42%	72.28%	75.97%		78.52%		

The following candidates were elected: Duminda Dissanayake (PA), 83,949 preference votes (pv); Tissa Karalliyadde (PA), 48,360 pv; P. Harrison (UNP), 45,834 pv; Chandrani Bandara Jayasinghe (UNP), 41,874 pv; W. B. Ekanayake (UNP), 41,461 pv; Don Simanralalage Shantha Premaratne (PA), 35,800 pv; Appuhamilage Herath Banda Semasinghe (PA), 35,090 pv; and Punchi Banda Dissanayake (PA), 33,738 pv.

== 2001 Parliamentary General Election ==
Results of the 12th parliamentary election held on 5 December 2001 for the district:

Party	Votes per Polling Division							Postal Votes	Total Votes	%	Seats
Party	Anura- dhapura East	Anura- dhapura West	Horow- patana	Kala- wewa	Keki- rawa	Medawa- chchiya	Mihin -tale	Postal Votes	Total Votes	%	Seats
United National Front (UNP, SLMC, CWC, DPF)	23,421	27,308	20,699	28,282	22,853	19,763	15,669		165,055	45.93%	4
People's Alliance (SLFP et al.)	20,359	20,766	18,007	31,042	17,088	20,390	14,429		149,393	41.57%	3
Janatha Vimukthi Peramuna	7,739	5,003	4,454	7,947	3,754	4,647	4,488		40,005	11.13%	1
New Left Front (NSSP et al.)	378	466	402	686	412	543	325		3,279	0.91%	0
Sinhala Heritage	202	104	39	98	43	57	45		625	0.17%	0
United Sinhala Great Council	32	82	32	70	42	52	33		336	0.09%	0
Independent 3	18	30	19	33	30	19	11		163	0.05%	0
People's Freedom Front	15	15	17	37	12	19	13		141	0.04%	0
National Development Front	19	17	7	16	20	12	14		107	0.03%	0
Independent 1	17	9	6	19	3	4	5		66	0.02%	0
Independent 2	6	5	5	14	7	7	6		50	0.01%	0
Ruhuna People's Party	3	6	4	5	3	17	9		48	0.01%	0
Sri Lanka Progressive Front	13	6	4	10	5	3	3		45	0.01%	0
Sri Lanka National Front	6	7	2	8	4	3	1		31	0.01%	0
Valid Votes	52,228	53,824	43,697	68,267	44,276	45,536	35,051		359,344	100.00%	8
Rejected Votes	2,560	2,994	2,340	4,398	2,621	2,284	2,211		19,796		
Total Polled	54,788	56,818	46,037	72,665	46,897	47,820	37,262		379,140		
Registered Electors	73,626	78,076	62,393	97,120	62,502	65,903	50,126		489,746		
Turnout	74.41%	72.77%	73.79%	74.82%	75.03%	72.56%	74.34%		77.42%		

The following candidates were elected: Duminda Dissanayake (PA), 76,088 preference votes (pv); P. Harrison (UNF), 69,878 pv; Chandrani Bandara Jayasinghe (UNF), 54,969 pv; W. B. Ekanayake (UNF), 51,373 pv; S. M. Chandrasena (PA), 38,090 pv; Lal Dharmapriya Gamage (UNF), 36,609 pv; Tissa Karalliyadde (PA), 35,608 pv; and K. D. Lalkantha (JVP), 4,304 pv.

== 2004 Parliamentary General Election ==
Results of the 13th parliamentary election held on 2 April 2004 for the district:

Party	Votes per Polling Division							Postal Votes	Total Votes	%	Seats
Party	Anura- dhapura East	Anura- dhapura West	Horow- patana	Kala- wewa	Keki- rawa	Medawa- chchiya	Mihin -tale	Postal Votes	Total Votes	%	Seats
United People's Freedom Alliance (SLFP, JVP et al.)	30,591	28,821	24,924	42,639	24,446	27,978	21,008	12,536	212,943	57.22%	5
United National Front (UNP, SLMC, CWC, DPF)	20,623	23,876	18,231	26,744	19,606	17,809	14,336	7,387	148,612	39.94%	3
Jathika Hela Urumaya	2,045	1,260	500	1,314	1,165	484	602	664	8,034	2.16%	0
United Socialist Party	164	254	244	242	186	191	132	26	1,439	0.39%	0
National Development Front	70	81	51	74	65	38	36	17	432	0.12%	0
New Left Front (NSSP et al.)	48	26	9	41	21	9	17	6	177	0.05%	0
Independent 5	23	30	12	15	11	17	16	2	126	0.03%	0
Independent 4	12	16	11	20	14	15	9	3	100	0.03%	0
Swarajya	11	22	4	2	1	6	4	1	51	0.01%	0
Independent 3	5	7	8	12	3	9	3	2	49	0.01%	0
Sri Lanka Progressive Front	2	9	1	5	11	1	4	0	33	0.01%	0
Independent 1	4	5	4	4	4	6	6	0	33	0.01%	0
Sinhalaye Mahasammatha Bhoomiputra Pakshaya	6	6	4	2	4	3	2	1	28	0.01%	0
Sri Lanka National Front	7	2	3	2	4	5	1	3	27	0.01%	0
Independent 2	8	3	2	6	3	0	2	2	26	0.01%	0
Ruhuna People's Party	1	3	5	1	2	2	0	1	15	0.00%	0
Valid Votes	53,620	54,421	44,013	71,123	45,546	46,573	36,178	20,651	372,125	100.00%	8
Rejected Votes	3,134	3,401	2,309	4,454	2,725	2,361	2,253	644	21,281		
Total Polled	56,754	57,822	46,322	75,577	48,271	48,934	38,431	21,295	393,406		
Registered Electors	77,391	81,435	65,482	102,138	66,036	68,897	52,770		514,149		
Turnout	73.33%	71.00%	70.74%	73.99%	73.10%	71.02%	72.83%		76.52%		

The following candidates were elected: K. D. Lalkantha (UPFA-JVP), 114,319 preference votes (pv); R. P. A. Ranaweera Pathirana (UPFA-JVP), 103,086 pv; Duminda Dissanayake (UPFA-SLFP), 72,710 pv; P. Harrison (UNF-UNP), 60,777 pv; S. M. Chandrasena (UPFA-SLFP), 56,651 pv; Chandrani Bandara Jayasinghe (UNF-UNP), 49,471 pv; Tissa Karalliyadde (UPFA-SLFP), 40,933 pv; and W. B. Ekanayake (UNF-UNP), 38,183 pv.

== 2004 Provincial Council Election ==
Results of the 4th North Central provincial council election held on 10 July 2004 for the district:

Party	Votes per Polling Division							Postal Votes	Total Votes	%	Seats
Party	Anura- dhapura East	Anura- dhapura West	Horow- patana	Kala- wewa	Keki- rawa	Medawa- chchiya	Mihin -tale	Postal Votes	Total Votes	%	Seats
United People's Freedom Alliance (SLFP, JVP et al.)	26,333	26,199	20,986	38,703	22,230	25,705	18,751	9,070	187,977	63.92%	14
United National Party	13,442	14,929	10,053	16,016	11,174	11,249	7,996	4,307	89,166	30.32%	6
Sri Lanka Muslim Congress	995	1,570	4,671	1,169	2,154	1,254	2,413	165	14,391	4.89%	1
United Socialist Party	178	207	143	184	161	181	128	35	1,217	0.41%	0
National Development Front	46	75	68	110	382	79	68	17	845	0.29%	0
Sri Lanka Progressive Front	15	15	37	19	16	8	15	1	126	0.04%	0
Independent 3	12	16	12	20	10	12	16	1	99	0.03%	0
Sinhalaye Mahasammatha Bhoomiputra Pakshaya	6	13	6	14	6	6	6	17	74	0.03%	0
United Sinhala Great Council	15	11	12	14	6	5	4	6	73	0.02%	0
Independent 2	4	8	12	8	10	14	4	3	63	0.02%	0
Independent 1	15	7	6	13	7	7	2	3	60	0.02%	0
Valid Votes	41,061	43,050	36,006	56,270	36,156	38,520	29,403	13,625	294,091	100.00%	21
Rejected Votes	2,682	3,251	2,586	4,539	2,615	2,614	2,460	853	21,600		
Total Polled	43,743	46,301	38,592	60,809	38,771	41,134	31,863	14,478	315,691		
Registered Electors	77,391	81,435	65,482	102,138	66,036	68,897	52,770		514,149		
Turnout	56.52%	56.86%	58.94%	59.54%	58.71%	59.70%	60.38%		61.40%		

The following candidates were elected: Berty Premalal Dissanayake (UPFA), 79,936 preference votes (pv); M. Jayarathne (UPFA), 62,641 pv; Anura Dissanayake (UPFA), 35,515 pv; Aruna Dissanayake (UPFA), 34,481 pv; N. Rohana Pushpakumara (UPFA), 32,493 pv; S. C. Muthukumarana (UPFA), 25,632 pv; Manodara Gedara Keerthisinghe Wijerathne (UNP), 24,864 pv; K. H. Nandasena (UPFA), 24,054 pv; Gamage Weerasena (UPFA), 23,692 pv; Lakshman Jayawardhane (UPFA), 23,359 pv; Kapurubanda Dissanayakage Sunil Dissanayake (UNP), 19,513 pv; T. M. R. Siripala (UPFA), 17,000 pv; Appuhamige Herath Banda Semasinghe (UPFA), 16,639 pv; Adhikari Rani (UNP), 15,450 pv; Gunarathne Susil (UPFA), 15,264 pv; Abesinghe Mudiyanselage Ranbanda Abesinghe (UNP), 15,182 pv; R. B. Gnanathilake (UPFA), 15,164 pv; Anil Rathnayake (UNP), 13,441 pv; Aloysias Sunil Charles Fernando (UNP), 13,124 pv; Punchi Banda Dissanayake (UPFA), 12,833 pv; and A. K. Ravuttar Neina Muhammadu (SLMC), 7,558 pv.

== 2005 Presidential Election ==
Results of the 5th presidential election held on 17 November 2005 for the district:

Candidate	Party	Votes per Polling Division							Postal Votes	Total Votes	%
Candidate	Party	Anura- dhapura East	Anura- dhapura West	Horow- patana	Kala- wewa	Keki- rawa	Medawa- chchiya	Mihin -tale	Postal Votes	Total Votes	%
Mahinda Rajapaksa	UPFA	33,726	31,575	26,330	46,073	26,220	29,071	22,454	15,591	231,040	55.08%
Ranil Wickremasinghe	UNP	25,382	29,829	22,027	33,758	24,314	21,647	16,897	9,102	182,956	43.62%
A.A. Suraweera	NDF	169	250	201	256	196	192	160	24	1,448	0.35%
Siritunga Jayasuriya	USP	155	262	184	247	181	192	136	21	1,378	0.33%
Chamil Jayaneththi	NLF	65	107	70	99	65	81	54	28	569	0.14%
Victor Hettigoda	ULPP	82	77	34	107	53	54	37	34	478	0.11%
Aruna de Soyza	RPP	54	74	54	80	46	69	43	8	428	0.10%
Wimal Geeganage	SLNF	44	62	45	94	37	31	49	5	367	0.09%
Anura De Silva	ULF	32	61	20	54	32	33	26	3	261	0.06%
A.K.J. Arachchige	DUA	25	34	15	45	37	19	31	1	207	0.05%
Wije Dias	SEP	14	21	7	18	20	14	18	3	115	0.03%
P. Nelson Perera	SLPF	11	21	14	28	14	14	13	0	115	0.03%
H.S. Dharmadwaja	UNAF	5	11	10	20	9	10	7	0	72	0.02%
Valid Votes		59,764	62,384	49,011	80,879	51,224	51,427	39,925	24,820	419,434	100.00%
Rejected Votes		563	671	481	836	506	446	429	631	4,563	
Total Polled		60,327	63,055	49,492	81,715	51,730	51,873	40,354	25,451	423,997	
Registered Electors		80,971	86,433	68,066	106,717	68,671	71,396	54,554		536,808	
Turnout		74.50%	72.95%	72.71%	76.57%	75.33%	72.66%	73.97%		78.98%	

== 2008 Provincial Council Election ==
Results of the 5th North Central provincial council election held on 23 August 2008 for the district:

Party	Votes per Polling Division							Postal Votes	Total Votes	%	Seats
Party	Anura- dhapura East	Anura- dhapura West	Horow- patana	Kala- wewa	Keki- rawa	Medawa- chchiya	Mihin -tale	Postal Votes	Total Votes	%	Seats
United People's Freedom Alliance (SLFP et al.)	28,113	27,690	22,532	39,984	21,700	25,450	18,633	15,445	199,547	54.70%	12
United National Party	21,898	22,279	16,203	27,017	19,538	15,164	13,195	6,725	142,019	38.93%	8
Janatha Vimukthi Peramuna	3,936	2,312	2,203	3,661	1,649	2,082	2,397	1,117	19,357	5.31%	1
National Congress	61	215	723	111	187	231	440	65	2,033	0.56%	0
United Socialist Party	91	116	82	114	101	72	58	14	648	0.18%	0
United National Alliance	64	81	60	88	81	40	53	24	491	0.13%	0
National Development Front	17	16	63	27	19	12	12	12	178	0.05%	0
Independent 7	11	14	15	20	16	18	9	3	106	0.03%	0
Independent 6	8	17	6	12	7	11	7	2	70	0.02%	0
Left Front (NSSP et al.)	20	11	5	16	5	1	2	7	67	0.02%	0
National People's Party	8	7	5	12	4	4	7	4	51	0.01%	0
Independent 5	3	3	15	6	5	4	1	1	38	0.01%	0
Sinhalaye Mahasammatha Bhoomiputra Pakshaya	8	4	1	3	4	2	6	7	35	0.01%	0
Independent 3	6	3	6	6	3	3	3	0	30	0.01%	0
Independent 1	5	9	2	2	2	2	2	2	26	0.01%	0
Independent 2	4	4	5	2	6	1	2	2	26	0.01%	0
Independent 4	1	3	4	4	1	5	2	2	22	0.01%	0
Ruhuna People's Party	7	1	1	3	0	2	2	1	17	0.00%	0
Sri Lanka Progressive Front	1	4	1	3	3	1	0	3	16	0.00%	0
Valid Votes	54,262	52,789	41,932	71,091	43,331	43,105	34,831	23,436	364,777	100.00%	21
Rejected Votes	2,323	2,697	2,225	3,739	2,306	2,037	1,751	822	17,900		
Total Polled	56,585	55,486	44,157	74,830	45,637	45,142	36,582	24,258	382,677		
Registered Electors	86,208	91,972	72,114	113,350	72,777	74,962	58,034		569,417		
Turnout	65.64%	60.33%	61.23%	66.02%	62.71%	60.22%	63.04%		67.21%		

== 2010 Presidential Election ==
Results of the 6th presidential election held on 26 January 2010 for the district:

Candidate	Party	Votes per Polling Division							Postal Votes	Total Votes	%
Candidate	Party	Anura- dhapura East	Anura- dhapura West	Horow- patana	Kala- wewa	Keki- rawa	Medawa- chchiya	Mihin -tale	Postal Votes	Total Votes	%
Mahinda Rajapaksa	UPFA	41,418	41,965	33,622	57,967	34,101	35,996	27,619	25,760	298,448	66.32%
Sarath Fonseka	NDF	22,270	21,288	17,054	25,591	18,431	14,971	13,928	10,228	143,761	31.94%
M.C.M. Ismail	DUNF	241	262	311	295	227	236	206	143	1,921	0.43%
A.A. Suraweera	NDF	154	255	137	238	134	171	147	32	1,268	0.28%
W.V. Mahiman Ranjith	Ind 1	109	202	151	222	141	148	112	30	1,115	0.25%
A.S.P Liyanage	SLLP	60	68	53	96	61	83	57	10	488	0.11%
C.J. Sugathsiri Gamage	UDF	40	85	70	85	64	54	66	13	477	0.11%
Ukkubanda Wijekoon	Ind 3	35	63	37	91	60	56	65	10	417	0.09%
Sarath Manamendra	NSH	39	49	51	61	41	49	29	6	325	0.07%
Lal Perera	ONF	38	52	42	51	31	38	40	3	295	0.07%
Aithurus M. Illias	Ind 2	27	57	20	57	33	21	27	12	254	0.06%
Siritunga Jayasuriya	USP	32	41	22	42	37	31	25	7	237	0.05%
Vikramabahu Karunaratne	LF	29	36	28	34	19	16	10	11	183	0.04%
M. K. Shivajilingam	Ind 5	19	24	20	19	21	19	22	2	146	0.03%
Wije Dias	SEP	8	23	8	22	19	16	13	1	110	0.02%
Battaramulla Seelarathana	JP	10	21	9	26	16	12	3	5	102	0.02%
Aruna de Soyza	RPP	9	15	19	18	13	14	10	3	101	0.02%
Senaratna de Silva	PNF	8	16	6	13	9	16	16	9	93	0.02%
M. Mohamed Musthaffa	Ind 4	16	10	8	22	8	12	11	0	87	0.02%
Sanath Pinnaduwa	NA	6	21	8	16	15	5	10	1	82	0.02%
M.B. Thaminimulla	ACAKO	11	10	7	23	7	12	7	0	77	0.02%
Sarath Kongahage	UNAF	3	12	4	10	3	6	6	7	51	0.01%
Valid Votes		64,582	64,575	51,687	84,999	53,491	51,982	42,429	36,293	450,038	100.00%
Rejected Votes		517	583	356	650	396	293	358	632	3,785	
Total Polled		65,099	65,158	52,043	85,649	53,887	52,275	42,787	36,925	453,823	
Registered Electors		88,157	93,534	73,590	115,275	73,885	75,683	59,137		579,261	
Turnout		73.84%	69.66%	70.72%	74.30%	72.93%	69.07%	72.35%		78.35%	

== 2010 Parliamentary General Election ==
Results of the 14th parliamentary election held on 8 April 2010 for the district:

Party	Votes per Polling Division							Postal Votes	Total Votes	%	Seats
Party	Anura- dhapura East	Anura- dhapura West	Horow- patana	Kala- wewa	Keki- rawa	Medawa- chchiya	Mihin -tale	Postal Votes	Total Votes	%	Seats
United People's Freedom Alliance (SLFP et al.)	30,497	31,803	23,499	42,905	17,029	26,178	21,291	28,002	221,204	66.52%	7
United National Front (UNP, SLMC, DPF, SLFP(P))	11,019	11,370	10,186	14,662	10,850	8,404	6,645	7,224	80,360	24.17%	2
Democratic National Alliance (JVP et al.)	4,541	2,436	1,790	2,583	1,298	1,596	1,752	2,133	18,129	5.45%	0
Sinhalaye Mahasammatha Bhoomiputra Pakshaya	78	88	56	131	10,121	11	377	583	11,445	3.44%	0
Janasetha Peramuna	13	6	193	14	5	50	8	63	352	0.11%	0
Independent 1	22	23	12	24	26	23	15	11	156	0.05%	0
Sri Lanka National Front	20	1	19	21	55	4	23	4	147	0.04%	0
Independent 6	12	14	12	15	7	9	21	7	97	0.03%	0
United National Alternative Front	10	18	10	15	11	7	4	12	87	0.03%	0
Independent 7	11	15	10	12	18	4	9	7	86	0.03%	0
United Democratic Front	10	9	7	12	14	3	4	7	66	0.02%	0
Independent 5	3	4	5	4	19	20	5	5	65	0.02%	0
Independent 2	1	16	2	17	4	8	3	7	58	0.02%	0
Independent 3	6	5	3	10	17	10	1	1	53	0.02%	0
Patriotic National Front	9	3	3	9	14	5	5	3	51	0.02%	0
All Are Citizens, All Are Kings Organisation	6	2	12	7	6	2	3	11	49	0.01%	0
Left Liberation Front	15	5	2	15	2	4	2	3	48	0.01%	0
United Lanka Great Council	7	3	6	3	21	0	5	1	46	0.01%	0
Sri Lanka Labour Party	4	4	4	4	0	4	1	5	26	0.01%	0
Independent 4	3	2	1	2	1	3	1	0	13	0.00%	0
Valid Votes	46,287	45,827	35,832	60,465	39,518	36,345	30,175	38,089	332,538	100.00%	9
Rejected Votes	2,807	3,636	2,268	4,124	3,412	2,759	2,370	1,554	22,930		
Total Polled	49,094	49,463	38,100	64,589	42,930	39,104	32,545	39,643	355,468		
Registered Electors	88,157	93,534	73,590	115,275	73,885	75,683	59,137		579,261		
Turnout	55.69%	52.88%	51.77%	56.03%	58.10%	51.67%	55.03%		61.37%		

The following candidates were elected: S. M. Chandrasena (UPFA-SLFP), 112,644 preference votes (pv); Duminda Dissanayake (UPFA-SLFP), 101,384 pv; Tissa Karalliyadde (UPFA-SLFP), 55,017 pv; Asanka Shehan Semasinghe (UPFA), 46,115 pv; Sarath Chandrasiri Muthukumarana (UPFA), 44,645 pv; W. B. Ekanayake (UPFA), 40,634 pv; Chandrani Bandara Jayasinghe (UNF-UNP), 29,884 pv; Weerakumara Dissanayake (UPFA), 27,102 pv; and P. Harrison (UNF-UNP), 24,675 pv.
