= Lal Dharmapriya Gamage =

Sri Lankan politician (born 1954)

Hon. Lal Dharmapriya Gamage MP

Member of Parliament for Anuradhapura
- In office 1989–1994
- Preceded by: seat created

Personal details
- Born: 9 February 1954 (age 72) Sri Lanka
- Party: United National Party
- Education: Nalanda College Colombo
- Occupation: Politics
- Profession: Architect

Lal Dharmapriya Gamage (born 9 February 1954) is a Sri Lankan politician and the former Minister Assisting Foreign Affairs.

He is an architect by profession and was educated at Nalanda College Colombo.

Gamage was elected to parliament at the 9th parliamentary election, held on 15 February 1989, as the United National Party representative, in the Anuradhapura electorate.

== See also ==
- List of political families in Sri Lanka
