= W. B. Ekanayake =

Sri Lankan politician (1948–2024)

Hon. W. B. Ekanayake MP

Deputy Minister of Highways
- In office 2007–2010

Deputy Minister of Disaster Management
- In office 2010 – 12 January 2015

Member of Parliament for Anuradhapura District
- In office 2000 – 26 June 2015

Personal details
- Born: 19 March 1948
- Died: 10 October 2024 (aged 76) Anuradhapura, Sri Lanka
- Party: United National Party (Democratic)
- Other political affiliations: United People's Freedom Alliance
- Occupation: Farmer

Wilfred Bandara Ekanayake (19 March 1948 – 10 October 2024) was a Sri Lankan politician who was a member of the Parliament of Sri Lanka and a government minister.

Ekanayake died after a fall at his house in Anuradhapura, on 10 October 2024, at the age of 76.

== Sources ==
- "W. B. Ekanayake". Directory of Members. Parliament of Sri Lanka.
