= Horowpothana Polling Division =

Horowpothana
- Polling Division
- Coordinates: 8.438491°N 80.808644°E
- Country: Sri Lanka
- Province: North Central Province, Sri Lanka
- Electoral District: Anuradhapura Electoral District

Area
  - Total: 1,485.32 km^{2} (573.49 sq mi)

Population (2012)
  - Total: 124,321
  - Density: 84/km^{2} (220/sq mi)
- ISO 3166 code: EC-17B

The Horowpothana Polling Division is a Polling Division in the Anuradhapura Electoral District, in the North Central Province, Sri Lanka.

== Presidential Election Results ==
=== Summary ===
The winner of Horowpothana has matched the final country result 6 out of 8 times. Hence, Horowpothana is a Weak Bellwether for Presidential Elections.

Year	Horowpothana	Anuradhapura Electoral District	MAE %	Sri Lanka	MAE %
2019	SLPP	SLPP	4.67%	SLPP	1.79%
2015	UPFA	UPFA	0.60%	NDF	5.27%
2010	UPFA	UPFA	1.18%	UPFA	7.02%
2005	UPFA	UPFA	1.33%	UPFA	3.42%
1999	PA	PA	0.86%	PA	1.93%
1994	PA	PA	1.11%	PA	2.74%
1988	SLFP	SLFP	7.32%	UNP	15.55%
1982	UNP	UNP	1.45%	UNP	3.46%
Matches/Mean MAE	6/8	6/8	2.31%	8/8	5.15%

=== 2019 Sri Lankan Presidential Election ===
Party	Horowpothana		Anuradhapura Electoral District		Sri Lanka	
Party	Votes	%	Votes	%	Votes	%
SLPP	36,698	54.42%	342,223	58.97%	6,924,255	52.25%
NDF	27,274	40.44%	202,348	34.87%	5,564,239	41.99%
NMPP	1,967	2.92%	22,879	3.94%	418,553	3.16%
Other Parties (with < 1%)	1,499	2.22%	12,896	2.22%	345,452	2.61%
Valid Votes	67,438	99.29%	580,346	99.16%	13,252,499	98.99%
Rejected Votes	484	0.71%	4,916	0.84%	135,452	1.01%
Total Polled	67,922	85.81%	585,262	85.76%	13,387,951	83.71%
Registered Electors	79,155		682,450		15,992,568	

=== 2015 Sri Lankan Presidential Election ===
Party	Horowpothana		Anuradhapura Electoral District		Sri Lanka	
Party	Votes	%	Votes	%	Votes	%
UPFA	31,847	52.90%	281,161	53.59%	5,768,090	47.58%
NDF	27,662	45.95%	238,407	45.44%	6,217,162	51.28%
Other Parties (with < 1%)	692	1.15%	5,065	0.97%	138,200	1.14%
Valid Votes	60,201	99.23%	524,633	99.15%	12,123,452	98.85%
Rejected Votes	468	0.77%	4,500	0.85%	140,925	1.15%
Total Polled	60,669	74.81%	529,133	77.71%	12,264,377	78.69%
Registered Electors	81,099		680,877		15,585,942	

=== 2010 Sri Lankan Presidential Election ===
Party	Horowpothana		Anuradhapura Electoral District		Sri Lanka	
Party	Votes	%	Votes	%	Votes	%
UPFA	33,622	65.05%	298,448	66.32%	6,015,934	57.88%
NDF	17,054	32.99%	143,761	31.94%	4,173,185	40.15%
Other Parties (with < 1%)	1,011	1.96%	7,829	1.74%	204,494	1.97%
Valid Votes	51,687	99.32%	450,038	99.17%	10,393,613	99.03%
Rejected Votes	356	0.68%	3,785	0.83%	101,838	0.97%
Total Polled	52,043	70.72%	453,823	73.65%	10,495,451	66.70%
Registered Electors	73,590		616,186		15,734,587	

=== 2005 Sri Lankan Presidential Election ===
Party	Horowpothana		Anuradhapura Electoral District		Sri Lanka	
Party	Votes	%	Votes	%	Votes	%
UPFA	26,330	53.72%	231,040	55.08%	4,887,152	50.29%
UNP	22,027	44.94%	182,956	43.62%	4,706,366	48.43%
Other Parties (with < 1%)	654	1.33%	5,438	1.30%	123,521	1.27%
Valid Votes	49,011	99.03%	419,434	98.92%	9,717,039	98.88%
Rejected Votes	481	0.97%	4,563	1.08%	109,869	1.12%
Total Polled	49,492	72.71%	423,997	75.41%	9,826,908	69.51%
Registered Electors	68,066		562,259		14,136,979	

=== 1999 Sri Lankan Presidential Election ===
Party	Horowpothana		Anuradhapura Electoral District		Sri Lanka	
Party	Votes	%	Votes	%	Votes	%
PA	23,075	53.55%	189,073	54.14%	4,312,157	51.12%
UNP	17,732	41.15%	139,180	39.86%	3,602,748	42.71%
JVP	1,579	3.66%	14,612	4.18%	343,927	4.08%
Other Parties (with < 1%)	701	1.63%	6,336	1.81%	176,679	2.09%
Valid Votes	43,087	98.42%	349,201	98.05%	8,435,754	97.69%
Rejected Votes	690	1.58%	6,949	1.95%	199,536	2.31%
Total Polled	43,777	74.48%	356,150	75.63%	8,635,290	72.17%
Registered Electors	58,774		470,907		11,965,536	

=== 1994 Sri Lankan Presidential Election ===
Party	Horowpothana		Anuradhapura Electoral District		Sri Lanka	
Party	Votes	%	Votes	%	Votes	%
PA	26,000	65.19%	200,146	63.99%	4,709,205	62.28%
UNP	13,287	33.31%	107,342	34.32%	2,715,283	35.91%
Other Parties (with < 1%)	599	1.50%	5,309	1.70%	137,040	1.81%
Valid Votes	39,886	98.56%	312,797	98.05%	7,561,526	98.03%
Rejected Votes	581	1.44%	6,205	1.95%	151,706	1.97%
Total Polled	40,467	77.86%	319,002	76.16%	7,713,232	69.12%
Registered Electors	51,975		418,857		11,158,880	

=== 1988 Sri Lankan Presidential Election ===
Party	Horowpothana		Anuradhapura Electoral District		Sri Lanka	
Party	Votes	%	Votes	%	Votes	%
SLFP	7,038	62.99%	73,154	55.15%	2,289,857	44.95%
UNP	4,023	36.01%	56,951	42.94%	2,569,199	50.43%
SLMP	112	1.00%	2,529	1.91%	235,701	4.63%
Valid Votes	11,173	97.86%	132,634	98.36%	5,094,754	98.24%
Rejected Votes	244	2.14%	2,207	1.64%	91,499	1.76%
Total Polled	11,417	26.69%	134,841	40.18%	5,186,256	55.87%
Registered Electors	42,773		335,551		9,283,143	

=== 1982 Sri Lankan Presidential Election ===
Party	Horowpothana		Anuradhapura Electoral District		Sri Lanka	
Party	Votes	%	Votes	%	Votes	%
UNP	15,259	48.85%	117,873	49.84%	3,450,815	52.93%
SLFP	13,029	41.71%	102,973	43.54%	2,546,348	39.05%
JVP	2,719	8.71%	13,911	5.88%	273,428	4.19%
Other Parties (with < 1%)	227	0.73%	1,766	0.75%	249,460	3.83%
Valid Votes	31,234	98.90%	236,523	99.04%	6,520,156	98.78%
Rejected Votes	347	1.10%	2,294	0.96%	80,470	1.22%
Total Polled	31,581	86.15%	238,817	84.68%	6,600,626	80.15%
Registered Electors	36,657		282,018		8,235,358	

== Parliamentary Election Results ==
=== Summary ===
The winner of Horowpothana has matched the final country result 7 out of 7 times. Hence, Horowpothana is a Bellwether for Parliamentary Elections.

Year	Horowpothana	Anuradhapura Electoral District	MAE %	Sri Lanka	MAE %
2015	UNP	UPFA	2.55%	UNP	2.47%
2010	UPFA	UPFA	1.79%	UPFA	3.44%
2004	UPFA	UPFA	0.96%	UPFA	6.68%
2001	UNP	UNP	0.92%	UNP	2.39%
2000	PA	PA	2.26%	PA	1.25%
1994	PA	PA	0.31%	PA	3.38%
1989	UNP	UNP	0.46%	UNP	5.60%
Matches/Mean MAE	7/7	6/7	1.32%	7/7	3.60%

=== 2015 Sri Lankan Parliamentary Election ===
Party	Horowpothana		Anuradhapura Electoral District		Sri Lanka	
Party	Votes	%	Votes	%	Votes	%
UNP	26,086	47.87%	213,072	44.85%	5,098,916	45.77%
UPFA	25,089	46.04%	229,856	48.39%	4,732,664	42.48%
JVP	2,707	4.97%	28,701	6.04%	544,154	4.88%
Other Parties (with < 1%)	616	1.13%	3,418	0.72%	80,543	0.72%
Valid Votes	54,498	93.99%	475,047	94.28%	11,140,333	95.35%
Rejected Votes	3,421	5.90%	28,462	5.65%	516,926	4.42%
Total Polled	57,984	71.50%	503,845	79.13%	11,684,111	77.66%
Registered Electors	81,099		636,733		15,044,490	

=== 2010 Sri Lankan Parliamentary Election ===
Party	Horowpothana		Anuradhapura Electoral District		Sri Lanka	
Party	Votes	%	Votes	%	Votes	%
UPFA	23,499	65.58%	221,204	66.52%	4,846,388	60.38%
UNP	10,186	28.43%	80,360	24.17%	2,357,057	29.37%
DNA	1,790	5.00%	18,129	5.45%	441,251	5.50%
Other Parties (with < 1%)	357	1.00%	12,845	3.86%	30,824	0.38%
Valid Votes	35,832	94.05%	332,538	93.55%	8,026,322	96.03%
Rejected Votes	2,268	5.95%	22,930	6.45%	581,465	6.96%
Total Polled	38,100	51.77%	355,468	57.35%	8,358,246	59.29%
Registered Electors	73,590		619,845		14,097,690	

=== 2004 Sri Lankan Parliamentary Election ===
Party	Horowpothana		Anuradhapura Electoral District		Sri Lanka	
Party	Votes	%	Votes	%	Votes	%
UPFA	24,924	56.63%	212,943	57.22%	4,223,126	45.70%
UNP	18,231	41.42%	148,612	39.94%	3,486,792	37.73%
JHU	500	1.14%	8,034	2.16%	552,723	5.98%
Other Parties (with < 1%)	358	0.81%	2,536	0.68%	51,070	0.55%
Valid Votes	44,013	95.02%	372,125	94.59%	9,241,931	94.52%
Rejected Votes	2,309	4.98%	21,281	5.41%	534,452	5.47%
Total Polled	46,322	70.74%	393,406	76.52%	9,777,821	75.74%
Registered Electors	65,482		514,149		12,909,631	

=== 2001 Sri Lankan Parliamentary Election ===
Party	Horowpothana		Anuradhapura Electoral District		Sri Lanka	
Party	Votes	%	Votes	%	Votes	%
UNP	20,699	47.37%	165,055	45.93%	4,086,026	45.62%
PA	18,007	41.21%	149,393	41.57%	3,330,815	37.19%
JVP	4,454	10.19%	40,005	11.13%	815,353	9.10%
Other Parties (with < 1%)	537	1.23%	4,891	1.36%	108,710	1.21%
Valid Votes	43,697	94.92%	359,344	94.78%	8,955,844	94.77%
Rejected Votes	2,340	5.08%	19,796	5.22%	494,009	5.23%
Total Polled	46,037	73.79%	379,140	77.41%	9,449,878	76.03%
Registered Electors	62,393		489,776		12,428,762	

=== 2000 Sri Lankan Parliamentary Election ===
Party	Horowpothana		Anuradhapura Electoral District		Sri Lanka	
Party	Votes	%	Votes	%	Votes	%
PA	19,196	44.61%	169,424	48.30%	3,899,329	45.33%
UNP	18,084	42.02%	144,662	41.24%	3,451,765	40.12%
NUA	2,885	6.70%	9,369	2.67%	185,593	2.16%
JVP	2,295	5.33%	21,274	6.06%	518,725	6.03%
Other Parties (with < 1%)	575	1.34%	6,042	1.72%	245,927	2.86%
Valid Votes	43,035	N/A	350,771	N/A	8,602,617	N/A

=== 1994 Sri Lankan Parliamentary Election ===
Party	Horowpothana		Anuradhapura Electoral District		Sri Lanka	
Party	Votes	%	Votes	%	Votes	%
PA	22,825	55.54%	180,454	55.19%	3,887,805	48.94%
UNP	17,966	43.72%	142,084	43.45%	3,498,370	44.04%
Other Parties (with < 1%)	307	0.75%	4,446	1.36%	158,616	2.00%
Valid Votes	41,098	96.36%	326,984	95.72%	7,943,688	95.20%
Rejected Votes	1,552	3.64%	14,620	4.28%	400,395	4.80%
Total Polled	42,650	82.06%	341,604	81.54%	8,344,095	74.75%
Registered Electors	51,975		418,959		11,163,064	

=== 1989 Sri Lankan Parliamentary Election ===
Party	Horowpothana		Anuradhapura Electoral District		Sri Lanka	
Party	Votes	%	Votes	%	Votes	%
UNP	10,563	56.97%	92,726	56.39%	2,838,005	50.71%
SLFP	7,275	39.24%	64,010	38.92%	1,785,369	31.90%
IND	464	2.50%	4,057	2.47%	12,285	0.22%
Other Parties (with < 1%)	238	1.28%	3,652	2.22%	300,186	5.36%
Valid Votes	18,540	94.30%	164,445	92.03%	5,596,468	93.87%
Rejected Votes	1,121	5.70%	14,245	7.97%	365,563	6.13%
Total Polled	19,661	46.60%	178,690	53.49%	5,962,031	63.60%
Registered Electors	42,195		334,073		9,374,164	

== Demographics ==
=== Ethnicity ===
The Horowpothana Polling Division has a Sinhalese majority (84.1%) and a significant Moor population (15.6%) . In comparison, the Anuradhapura Electoral District (which contains the Horowpothana Polling Division) has a Sinhalese majority (91.0%)

Ethnicity in Horowpothana
1. Sinhalese (84.1%)
2. Moor (15.6%)
3. Other (0.30%)

=== Religion ===
The Horowpothana Polling Division has a Buddhist majority (83.8%) and a significant Muslim population (15.6%) . In comparison, the Anuradhapura Electoral District (which contains the Horowpothana Polling Division) has a Buddhist majority (90.1%)

Religion in Horowpothana
1. Buddhist (83.8%)
2. Muslim (15.6%)
3. Other (0.60%)
