= Anuradhapura East Polling Division =

Anuradhapura East
- Polling Division
- Coordinates: 8.459069°N 80.430866°E
- Country: Sri Lanka
- Province: North Central Province, Sri Lanka
- Electoral District: Anuradhapura Electoral District

Area
  - Total: 711.73 km^{2} (274.80 sq mi)

Population (2012)
  - Total: 98,005
  - Density: 138/km^{2} (360/sq mi)
- ISO 3166 code: EC-17C

The Anuradhapura East Polling Division is a Polling Division in the Anuradhapura Electoral District, in the North Central Province, Sri Lanka.

== Presidential Election Results ==
=== Summary ===
The winner of Anuradhapura East has matched the final country result 6 out of 8 times. Hence, Anuradhapura East is a Weak Bellwether for Presidential Elections.

Year	Anuradhapura East	Anuradhapura Electoral District	MAE %	Sri Lanka	MAE %
2019	SLPP	SLPP	2.22%	SLPP	8.84%
2015	UPFA	UPFA	1.95%	NDF	3.90%
2010	UPFA	UPFA	2.26%	UPFA	5.89%
2005	UPFA	UPFA	1.24%	UPFA	5.98%
1999	PA	PA	2.10%	PA	0.88%
1994	PA	PA	1.17%	PA	0.47%
1988	SLFP	SLFP	3.42%	UNP	5.21%
1982	UNP	UNP	1.66%	UNP	5.15%
Matches/Mean MAE	6/8	6/8	2.00%	8/8	4.54%

=== 2019 Sri Lankan Presidential Election ===
Party	Anuradhapura East		Anuradhapura Electoral District		Sri Lanka	
Party	Votes	%	Votes	%	Votes	%
SLPP	49,708	60.71%	342,223	58.97%	6,924,255	52.25%
NDF	25,910	31.64%	202,348	34.87%	5,564,239	41.99%
NMPP	4,567	5.58%	22,879	3.94%	418,553	3.16%
Other Parties (with < 1%)	1,694	2.07%	12,896	2.22%	345,452	2.61%
Valid Votes	81,879	98.99%	580,346	99.16%	13,252,499	98.99%
Rejected Votes	836	1.01%	4,916	0.84%	135,452	1.01%
Total Polled	82,715	85.00%	585,262	85.76%	13,387,951	83.71%
Registered Electors	97,314		682,450		15,992,568	

=== 2015 Sri Lankan Presidential Election ===
Party	Anuradhapura East		Anuradhapura Electoral District		Sri Lanka	
Party	Votes	%	Votes	%	Votes	%
UPFA	38,947	51.69%	281,161	53.59%	5,768,090	47.58%
NDF	35,779	47.49%	238,407	45.44%	6,217,162	51.28%
Other Parties (with < 1%)	621	0.82%	5,065	0.97%	138,200	1.14%
Valid Votes	75,347	99.14%	524,633	99.15%	12,123,452	98.85%
Rejected Votes	651	0.86%	4,500	0.85%	140,925	1.15%
Total Polled	75,998	77.89%	529,133	77.71%	12,264,377	78.69%
Registered Electors	97,576		680,877		15,585,942	

=== 2010 Sri Lankan Presidential Election ===
Party	Anuradhapura East		Anuradhapura Electoral District		Sri Lanka	
Party	Votes	%	Votes	%	Votes	%
UPFA	41,418	64.13%	298,448	66.32%	6,015,934	57.88%
NDF	22,270	34.48%	143,761	31.94%	4,173,185	40.15%
Other Parties (with < 1%)	894	1.38%	7,829	1.74%	204,494	1.97%
Valid Votes	64,582	99.21%	450,038	99.17%	10,393,613	99.03%
Rejected Votes	517	0.79%	3,785	0.83%	101,838	0.97%
Total Polled	65,099	73.84%	453,823	73.65%	10,495,451	66.70%
Registered Electors	88,157		616,186		15,734,587	

=== 2005 Sri Lankan Presidential Election ===
Party	Anuradhapura East		Anuradhapura Electoral District		Sri Lanka	
Party	Votes	%	Votes	%	Votes	%
UPFA	33,726	56.43%	231,040	55.08%	4,887,152	50.29%
UNP	25,382	42.47%	182,956	43.62%	4,706,366	48.43%
Other Parties (with < 1%)	656	1.10%	5,438	1.30%	123,521	1.27%
Valid Votes	59,764	99.07%	419,434	98.92%	9,717,039	98.88%
Rejected Votes	563	0.93%	4,563	1.08%	109,869	1.12%
Total Polled	60,327	74.50%	423,997	75.41%	9,826,908	69.51%
Registered Electors	80,971		562,259		14,136,979	

=== 1999 Sri Lankan Presidential Election ===
Party	Anuradhapura East		Anuradhapura Electoral District		Sri Lanka	
Party	Votes	%	Votes	%	Votes	%
PA	25,187	51.26%	189,073	54.14%	4,312,157	51.12%
UNP	20,153	41.02%	139,180	39.86%	3,602,748	42.71%
JVP	2,996	6.10%	14,612	4.18%	343,927	4.08%
Other Parties (with < 1%)	798	1.62%	6,336	1.81%	176,679	2.09%
Valid Votes	49,134	97.98%	349,201	98.05%	8,435,754	97.69%
Rejected Votes	1,015	2.02%	6,949	1.95%	199,536	2.31%
Total Polled	50,149	72.67%	356,150	75.63%	8,635,290	72.17%
Registered Electors	69,006		470,907		11,965,536	

=== 1994 Sri Lankan Presidential Election ===
Party	Anuradhapura East		Anuradhapura Electoral District		Sri Lanka	
Party	Votes	%	Votes	%	Votes	%
PA	27,421	62.78%	200,146	63.99%	4,709,205	62.28%
UNP	15,490	35.46%	107,342	34.32%	2,715,283	35.91%
Other Parties (with < 1%)	766	1.75%	5,309	1.70%	137,040	1.81%
Valid Votes	43,677	97.89%	312,797	98.05%	7,561,526	98.03%
Rejected Votes	943	2.11%	6,205	1.95%	151,706	1.97%
Total Polled	44,620	71.91%	319,002	76.16%	7,713,232	69.12%
Registered Electors	62,048		418,857		11,158,880	

=== 1988 Sri Lankan Presidential Election ===
Party	Anuradhapura East		Anuradhapura Electoral District		Sri Lanka	
Party	Votes	%	Votes	%	Votes	%
SLFP	11,516	51.31%	73,154	55.15%	2,289,857	44.95%
UNP	10,310	45.94%	56,951	42.94%	2,569,199	50.43%
SLMP	617	2.75%	2,529	1.91%	235,701	4.63%
Valid Votes	22,443	98.37%	132,634	98.36%	5,094,754	98.24%
Rejected Votes	371	1.63%	2,207	1.64%	91,499	1.76%
Total Polled	22,814	45.32%	134,841	40.18%	5,186,256	55.87%
Registered Electors	50,340		335,551		9,283,143	

=== 1982 Sri Lankan Presidential Election ===
Party	Anuradhapura East		Anuradhapura Electoral District		Sri Lanka	
Party	Votes	%	Votes	%	Votes	%
UNP	15,856	48.07%	117,873	49.84%	3,450,815	52.93%
SLFP	14,944	45.31%	102,973	43.54%	2,546,348	39.05%
JVP	1,891	5.73%	13,911	5.88%	273,428	4.19%
Other Parties (with < 1%)	291	0.88%	1,766	0.75%	249,460	3.83%
Valid Votes	32,982	98.90%	236,523	99.04%	6,520,156	98.78%
Rejected Votes	366	1.10%	2,294	0.96%	80,470	1.22%
Total Polled	33,348	80.13%	238,817	84.68%	6,600,626	80.15%
Registered Electors	41,615		282,018		8,235,358	

== Parliamentary Election Results ==
=== Summary ===
The winner of Anuradhapura East has matched the final country result 6 out of 7 times. Hence, Anuradhapura East is a Strong Bellwether for Parliamentary Elections.

Year	Anuradhapura East	Anuradhapura Electoral District	MAE %	Sri Lanka	MAE %
2015	UPFA	UPFA	1.83%	UNP	3.83%
2010	UPFA	UPFA	0.86%	UPFA	5.19%
2004	UPFA	UPFA	0.72%	UPFA	5.60%
2001	UNP	UNP	1.99%	UNP	1.54%
2000	PA	PA	1.44%	PA	1.17%
1994	PA	PA	0.56%	PA	3.19%
1989	UNP	UNP	2.87%	UNP	5.89%
Matches/Mean MAE	6/7	6/7	1.47%	7/7	3.77%

=== 2015 Sri Lankan Parliamentary Election ===
Party	Anuradhapura East		Anuradhapura Electoral District		Sri Lanka	
Party	Votes	%	Votes	%	Votes	%
UPFA	32,314	47.33%	229,856	48.39%	4,732,664	42.48%
UNP	28,944	42.39%	213,072	44.85%	5,098,916	45.77%
JVP	6,497	9.52%	28,701	6.04%	544,154	4.88%
Other Parties (with < 1%)	521	0.76%	3,418	0.72%	80,543	0.72%
Valid Votes	68,276	95.45%	475,047	94.28%	11,140,333	95.35%
Rejected Votes	3,224	4.51%	28,462	5.65%	516,926	4.42%
Total Polled	71,533	73.31%	503,845	79.13%	11,684,111	77.66%
Registered Electors	97,576		636,733		15,044,490	

=== 2010 Sri Lankan Parliamentary Election ===
Party	Anuradhapura East		Anuradhapura Electoral District		Sri Lanka	
Party	Votes	%	Votes	%	Votes	%
UPFA	30,497	65.89%	221,204	66.52%	4,846,388	60.38%
UNP	11,019	23.81%	80,360	24.17%	2,357,057	29.37%
DNA	4,541	9.81%	18,129	5.45%	441,251	5.50%
Other Parties (with < 1%)	230	0.50%	12,845	3.86%	30,824	0.38%
Valid Votes	46,287	94.28%	332,538	93.55%	8,026,322	96.03%
Rejected Votes	2,807	5.72%	22,930	6.45%	581,465	6.96%
Total Polled	49,094	55.69%	355,468	57.35%	8,358,246	59.29%
Registered Electors	88,157		619,845		14,097,690	

=== 2004 Sri Lankan Parliamentary Election ===
Party	Anuradhapura East		Anuradhapura Electoral District		Sri Lanka	
Party	Votes	%	Votes	%	Votes	%
UPFA	30,591	57.05%	212,943	57.22%	4,223,126	45.70%
UNP	20,623	38.46%	148,612	39.94%	3,486,792	37.73%
JHU	2,045	3.81%	8,034	2.16%	552,723	5.98%
Other Parties (with < 1%)	361	0.67%	2,536	0.68%	51,070	0.55%
Valid Votes	53,620	94.48%	372,125	94.59%	9,241,931	94.52%
Rejected Votes	3,134	5.52%	21,281	5.41%	534,452	5.47%
Total Polled	56,754	73.33%	393,406	76.52%	9,777,821	75.74%
Registered Electors	77,391		514,149		12,909,631	

=== 2001 Sri Lankan Parliamentary Election ===
Party	Anuradhapura East		Anuradhapura Electoral District		Sri Lanka	
Party	Votes	%	Votes	%	Votes	%
UNP	23,421	44.84%	165,055	45.93%	4,086,026	45.62%
PA	20,359	38.98%	149,393	41.57%	3,330,815	37.19%
JVP	7,739	14.82%	40,005	11.13%	815,353	9.10%
Other Parties (with < 1%)	709	1.36%	4,891	1.36%	108,710	1.21%
Valid Votes	52,228	95.33%	359,344	94.78%	8,955,844	94.77%
Rejected Votes	2,560	4.67%	19,796	5.22%	494,009	5.23%
Total Polled	54,788	74.41%	379,140	77.41%	9,449,878	76.03%
Registered Electors	73,626		489,776		12,428,762	

=== 2000 Sri Lankan Parliamentary Election ===
Party	Anuradhapura East		Anuradhapura Electoral District		Sri Lanka	
Party	Votes	%	Votes	%	Votes	%
PA	23,078	46.11%	169,424	48.30%	3,899,329	45.33%
UNP	20,825	41.61%	144,662	41.24%	3,451,765	40.12%
JVP	4,587	9.16%	21,274	6.06%	518,725	6.03%
Other Parties (with < 1%)	997	1.99%	6,042	1.72%	245,927	2.86%
NUA	567	1.13%	9,369	2.67%	185,593	2.16%
Valid Votes	50,054	N/A	350,771	N/A	8,602,617	N/A

=== 1994 Sri Lankan Parliamentary Election ===
Party	Anuradhapura East		Anuradhapura Electoral District		Sri Lanka	
Party	Votes	%	Votes	%	Votes	%
PA	25,277	54.52%	180,454	55.19%	3,887,805	48.94%
UNP	19,949	43.03%	142,084	43.45%	3,498,370	44.04%
SLPF	849	1.83%	3,077	0.94%	90,078	1.13%
Other Parties (with < 1%)	285	0.61%	1,369	0.42%	68,538	0.86%
Valid Votes	46,360	96.11%	326,984	95.72%	7,943,688	95.20%
Rejected Votes	1,878	3.89%	14,620	4.28%	400,395	4.80%
Total Polled	48,238	77.74%	341,604	81.54%	8,344,095	74.75%
Registered Electors	62,048		418,959		11,163,064	

=== 1989 Sri Lankan Parliamentary Election ===
Party	Anuradhapura East		Anuradhapura Electoral District		Sri Lanka	
Party	Votes	%	Votes	%	Votes	%
UNP	10,763	59.52%	92,726	56.39%	2,838,005	50.71%
SLFP	6,552	36.23%	64,010	38.92%	1,785,369	31.90%
USA	376	2.08%	1,724	1.05%	141,983	2.54%
ELJP	201	1.11%	1,397	0.85%	67,723	1.21%
Other Parties (with < 1%)	190	1.05%	4,588	2.79%	102,765	1.84%
Valid Votes	18,082	93.25%	164,445	92.03%	5,596,468	93.87%
Rejected Votes	1,309	6.75%	14,245	7.97%	365,563	6.13%
Total Polled	19,391	39.53%	178,690	53.49%	5,962,031	63.60%
Registered Electors	49,059		334,073		9,374,164	

== Demographics ==
=== Ethnicity ===
The Anuradhapura East Polling Division has a Sinhalese majority (87.8%) and a significant Moor population (11.2%) . In comparison, the Anuradhapura Electoral District (which contains the Anuradhapura East Polling Division) has a Sinhalese majority (91.0%)

Ethnicity in Anuradhapura East
1. Sinhalese (87.8%)
2. Moor (11.2%)
3. Other (1.10%)

=== Religion ===
The Anuradhapura East Polling Division has a Buddhist majority (87.0%) and a significant Muslim population (11.2%) . In comparison, the Anuradhapura Electoral District (which contains the Anuradhapura East Polling Division) has a Buddhist majority (90.1%)

Religion in Anuradhapura East
1. Buddhist (87.0%)
2. Muslim (11.2%)
3. Other (1.80%)
