= Sena Nanayakkara =

Sri Lankan politician

Hon. Sena Nanayakkara MP
- සේන නානායක්කාර சேனா நாணாயக்கார
- Incumbent
- Assumed office 18 November 2024
- President: Anura Kumara Dissanayake
- Prime Minister: Harini Amarasuriya

Member of Parliament for Anuradhapura District
- Incumbent
- Assumed office 21 November 2024
- Majority: 86,150 Preferential votes

Personal details
- Born: 21 July 1960 (age 66) Anuradhapura Hospital
- Party: National People's Power
- Education: University of Kelaniya
- Profession: Senior Professor

Sena Nanayakkara is a Sri Lankan politician and academic who serves as a Member of Parliament for the Anuradhapura Electoral District since November 2024. He was elected during the 2024 Sri Lankan parliamentary election, securing 86,150 preferential votes. He is affiliated with the National People's Power coalition and the Janatha Vimukthi Peramuna.

== Academic career ==
Nanayakkara is an academic, holding the position of Senior Professor in Mass Communication. He completed his B.A. (Hons.), M.A. Research, and Ph.D. in Mass Communication at the University of Kelaniya. His research interests include topics related to mass communication, where he has contributed significantly through teaching and publications.

== Political career ==
Sena Nanayakkara entered politics with his election to the 17th Parliament of Sri Lanka in 2024. Representing the Anuradhapura District, his campaign focused on education, communication policies, and public welfare.

== See also ==
- 2024 Sri Lankan parliamentary election
- National People's Power
- Parliament of Sri Lanka
