= Ministry of Women, Child Affairs and Social Empowerment =

Government ministry of Sri Lanka

- කාන්තා, ළමා කටයුතු හා සමාජ සවිබලගැන්වීම් අමාත්‍යාංශය மகளிர், சிறுவர் அலுவல்கள் மற்றும் சமூக வலுப்படுத்துகை அமைச்சு

Agency overview
- Formed: 1997; 29 years ago as a separate ministry
- Jurisdiction: Government of Sri Lanka
- Headquarters: 3rd and 5th Floor, Sethsiripaya Stage II, Battaramulla, Sri Lanka
- Annual budget: ▲LKR 14.134 Billion (2025)
- Minister responsible: Saroja Savithri Paulraj
- Deputy Minister responsible: Namal Sudarshana
- Agency executives: Mrs. Yamuna Perera, Secretary; Mr. J. P. S. Jayasinghe, Director General
- Child agencies: Children's Secretariat; Department of Probation & Child Care Services; National Child Protection Authority; National Committee on Women; Women’s Bureau
- Website: Official website

The Ministry of Women, Child Affairs and Social Empowerment (Sinhala: කාන්තා, ළමා කටයුතු හා සමාජ සවිබලගැන්වීම් අමාත්‍යාංශය, romanized: Kānthā, Ḷamā Kaṭayutu Hā Samāja Savibalagănvīm Amātyāṃśaya; Tamil: மகளிர், சிறுவர் அலுவல்கள் மற்றும் சமூக வலுப்படுத்துகை அமைச்சு) is the Sri Lankan government ministry responsible for "Formulating, executing and regulating provisions and policies aligned to practices of good governance to ensure the rights of children and women by empowering socio-economic conditions, instilling values and ensuring participation through strategic integration with all stakeholders leading to a dignified nation".

== Overview ==
Vision:

A strong nation of women and children with ensured rights that contributes towards sustainable development.

Mission:

To formulate, implement, monitor, evaluate and co-ordinate policies and programmes required for the physical and human resource development with a concerted approach in order to create an empowered conductive environment that ensures social, economic and cultural development and rights of women and children.

== List of ministers ==
The Minister of Women, Child Affairs and Social Empowerment is an appointment in the Cabinet of Sri Lanka.

Parties

Sri Lanka Freedom Party United National Party Sri Lanka Podujana Peramuna National People's Power

Name	Portrait	Party	Title	Tenure	President
Sumedha Jayasena		Sri Lanka Freedom Party	Minister of Women Affairs & Social Welfare	19 October 2000 - 14 September 2001	Chandrika Kumaratunga
Ferial Ashraff		United National Party	Minister of Development, Rehabilitation and Reconstruction of the East, Rural Housing Development and Women's Affairs	14 September 2001 - 10 April 2004	Chandrika Kumaratunga
Sumedha Jayasena		Sri Lanka Freedom Party	Minister of Child Development & Women's Empowerment Minister of Parliamentary Affairs	10 April 2004 - 23 April 2010	Mahinda Rajapaksa
Tissa Karalliyadde		Sri Lanka Freedom Party	Minister of Child Development and Women's Affairs	23 April 2010 - 9 January 2015	Mahinda Rajapaksa
Chandrani Bandara Jayasinghe		United National Party	Minister of Women's Affairs; Minister of Women and Child Affairs	12 January 2015 - 21 November 2019	Maithripala Sirisena
Pavithra Wanniarachchi		Sri Lanka Podujana Peramuna	Minister of Women & Child Affairs and Dry Zone Development; Minister of Women & Child Affairs and Social Security	22 November 2019 - 11 August 2020	Gotabaya Rajapaksa
Piyal Nishantha de Silva		Sri Lanka Podujana Peramuna	State Minister of Women and Child Development, Pre-schools & Primary Education, School Infrastructure & Education Services	12 August 2020 - 9 May 2022	Gotabaya Rajapaksa
Ranil Wickremesinghe		United National Party	Minister of Women, Child Affairs and Social Empowerment	4 November 2022 - 24 September 2024	Ranil Wickremesinghe
Harini Amarasuriya		National People's Power	Minister of Women, Child and Youth Affairs and Sports	24 September 2024 - 17 November 2024	Anura Kumara Dissanayake
Saroja Savithri Paulraj		National People's Power	Minister of Women and Child Affairs	18 November 2024 – Present	Anura Kumara Dissanayake

== History ==
History of the Ministry	Year
Women's Bureau in Sri Lanka was 1st established under the Ministry of Plan Implementation	1978
Women's Bureau in Sri Lanka was re-established under the Ministry of Women's Affairs and Teaching Hospital	1983
Ministry of Women's Affairs. (Separate Ministry)	1997
Ministry of Women Empowerment and Social Welfare	2004
Ministry of Child Development and Women's Empowerment	2006
Ministry of Child Development and Women's Affairs	2010
Ministry of Women's Affairs.	2015
Ministry of Women and Child Affairs	2015
Ministry of Women & Child Affairs and Dry Zone Development	2018
Ministry of Women & Child Affairs and Social Security	2019
State Ministry of Women and Child Development, Pre-schools & Primary Education, School Infrastructure & Education Services	2020

== See also ==
- Ministries of Sri Lanka
