= Rohana Bandara =

Sri Lankan politician

Hon. Rohana Bandara MP
- රෝහණ බණ්ඩාර ரோஹன பண்டார

Member of the Parliament of Sri Lanka
- Incumbent
- Assumed office 2020
- Constituency: Anuradhapura District

Member of the North Central Provincial Council
- In office 2012–2017
- Constituency: Anuradhapura District

Personal details
- Born: Wijesundara Mudiyanselage Rohana Bandara Wijesundara; 26 September 1977 (age 48)
- Party: United National Party
- Other political affiliations: Samagi Jana Balawegaya

Wijesundara Mudiyanselage Rohana Bandara Wijesundara (born 26 September 1977) is a Sri Lankan politician, former provincial councillor and Member of Parliament.

Bandara was born on 26 September 1977. He was a member of Galnewa Divisional Council and North Central Provincial Council. He contested the 2020 parliamentary election as a Samagi Jana Balawegaya electoral alliance candidate in Anuradhapura District and was elected to the Parliament of Sri Lanka.

Electoral history of Rohana Bandara
Election	Constituency	Party	Alliance	Votes	Result
2012 provincial	Anuradhapura District	United National Party		17,645	Elected
2020 parliamentary	Anuradhapura District	United National Party	Samagi Jana Balawegaya	39,520	Elected
