= Thilina Samarakoon =

Sri Lankan politician

Hon. Thilina Tharuka Samarakoon MP
- තිලිණ තාරුක සමරකෝන් திலின தாருக சமரகோன்
- Incumbent
- Assumed office 21 November 2024
- President: Anura Kumara Dissanayake
- Prime Minister: Harini Amarasuriya

Member of Parliament for Anuradhapura District
- Majority: 49,730 Preferential votes

Personal details
- Born: 14 February 1981 (age 45)
- Party: National People's Power
- Education: Rajarata University of Sri Lanka
- Occupation: Bank officer

Thilina Tharuka Samarakoon is a Sri Lankan politician and bank officer who serves as a Member of Parliament for the Anuradhapura Electoral District. He was elected during the 2024 Sri Lankan parliamentary election, receiving 49,730 preferential votes. He is a member of the National People's Power (NPP) and serves on its Anuradhapura District executive committee.

== Early life and education ==
Samarakoon attended Royal Central College, Polonnaruwa, completing his secondary education in 2001 after his Advanced Level exams in 2000. He later pursued higher education at Rajarata University of Sri Lanka, studying business management from 2003 to 2008.

== Career ==
Samarakoon began his career in banking and has been employed as an assistant manager at the Regional Development Bank since 2006.

== Political career ==
Samarakoon entered politics as part of the NPP and was elected to the 17th Parliament of Sri Lanka in 2024, representing the Anuradhapura District.

== Personal life ==
Samarakoon lives in Kekirawa, Sri Lanka, and hails from Polonnaruwa.

== See also ==
- 2024 Sri Lankan parliamentary election
- National People's Power
- Parliament of Sri Lanka
