= Weerakumara Dissanayake =

Sri Lankan politician

- වීරකුමාර දිසානායක வீரகுமார திஸாநாயக்க

State Minister of Mahaweli Development
- In office 2018–2018
- President: Maithripala Sirisena
- Prime Minister: Ranil Wickremesinghe

Deputy Minister of Traditional Industries and Small Enterprise Development
- In office 2010–2015
- President: Mahinda Rajapaksa
- Prime Minister: D. M. Jayaratne

Member of Parliament for Anuradhapura District
- In office 2010–2018

Member of Parliament for Puttalam District
- In office 2004–2010

Personal details
- Born: 10 April 1971 (age 55)
- Party: Sri Lanka Freedom Party
- Other political affiliations: United People's Freedom Alliance, National Freedom Front

Weerakumara Dissanayake (Sinhala: වීරකුමාර දිසානායක; born 10 April 1971) is a Sri Lankan politician and former member of the Parliament of Sri Lanka. He is a member of the Sri Lanka Freedom Party and member of the United People's Freedom Alliance (UPFA). He was deputy minister of Ministry of Traditional Industries and Small Enterprise Development from 2010 to 2015. In 2017 he left the National Freedom Front (NFF) to join the Sri Lanka Freedom Party.

== Political career ==
In the 2004 General Elections Weerakumara contested the Puttalam Electorate from the United People's Freedom Alliance and was elected. On 2 April 2018, Weerakumara was appointed as the State Minister of Mahaweli Development.

== Electoral history ==
Electoral history of Weerakumara Dissanayake
Election	Constituency	Party	Votes	Result
2004 parliamentary	Puttalama District	UPFA	50,194	Elected
2010 parliamentary	Anuradhapura District	UPFA	27,102	Elected
2015 parliamentary	Anuradhapura District	UPFA	69,489	Elected
2020 parliamentary	Anuradhapura District	UPFA	-	Not Elected
