= Saroja Savithri Paulraj =

Women and child affairs minister of Sri Lanka

Hon. Saroja Savithri Paulraj MP
- சரோஜா சாவித்திரி போல்ராஜ் සරෝජා සාවිත්‍රි පෝල්රාජ්

Minister of Women and Child Affairs
- Incumbent
- Assumed office 18 November 2024
- President: Anura Kumara Dissanayake
- Prime Minister: Harini Amarasuriya
- Preceded by: Harini Amarasuriya

Member of Parliament for Matara District
- Incumbent
- Assumed office 21 November 2024
- Majority: 148,379 Preferential votes

Personal details
- Party: National People's Power
- Spouse: Dr. Asitha Ramith Amarakoon

Saroja Savithri Paulraj is a Sri Lankan politician currently serving as the Minister of Women and Child Affairs of the Government of Sri Lanka since November 2024. She is a member of the Parliament of Sri Lanka from Matara Electoral District since November 2024 as a member of the National People's Power. She is also a national executive committee Member of NPP. Saroja made history by becoming the first Tamil Member of Parliament elected from the Matara District and the Southern Province.

== Electoral history ==
Electoral history of
Election	Constituency	Party	Votes	Result	Ref
2024 parliamentary	Matara District	National People's Power	148,379	Elected	

Political offices
Preceded by Harini Amarasuriya	Minister of Women and Child Affairs; November 2024–present	Incumbent
