= Bhagya Sri Herath =

Sri Lankan politician and attorney

Hon. Bhagya Sri Herath MP
- භාග්‍ය ශ්‍රී හේරත් பாக்ய ஸ்ரீ ஹேரத்
- Incumbent
- Assumed office 21 November 2024
- President: Anura Kumara Dissanayake
- Prime Minister: Harini Amarasuriya

Member of Parliament for Anuradhapura District
- Majority: 63,551 Preferential votes

Personal details
- Born: 15 July 1992 (age 34)
- Party: National People's Power
- Education: University of Peradeniya, Sri Lanka Law College
- Occupation: Attorney-at-law

Bhagya Sri Herath is a Sri Lankan politician and attorney-at-law who serves as a Member of Parliament for the Anuradhapura Electoral District. He was elected during the 2024 Sri Lankan parliamentary election, receiving 63,551 preferential votes. He is affiliated with the National People's Power (NPP) political coalition and is an executive committee member for the Anuradhapura District.

== Early life and education ==
Herath completed his secondary education at Anuradhapura Central College. He pursued higher education at the University of Peradeniya, earning an LLB degree, and further trained at the Sri Lanka Law College.

== Political career ==
Herath's political journey led to his election to the 17th Parliament of Sri Lanka in 2024, representing the Anuradhapura District. His work has focused on legal advocacy and community representation as part of the NPP.

== See also ==
- 2024 Sri Lankan parliamentary election
- National People's Power
- Parliament of Sri Lanka
