= Tissa Karalliyadde =

Sri Lankan politician

Hon. Tissa Karaliyedda MP
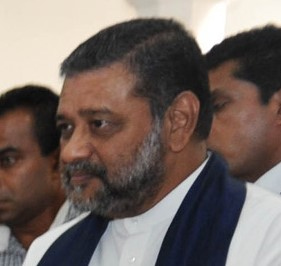
- Karaliyedda in March 2015

Minister of Women's Affairs
- In office 23 April 2010 – 12 January 2015
- President: Mahinda Rajapaksa
- Prime Minister: D. M. Jayaratne
- Succeeded by: Chandrani Bandara Jayasinghe

Member of Parliament for Anuradhapura

Personal details
- Born: 10 May 1952 (age 74) Anuradhapura, Sri Lanka
- Party: United People's Freedom Alliance
- Education: Nalanda College Colombo
- Occupation: Politics
- Profession: Agriculturist

Tissa Wijeratna Karalliyadde MP (born 10 May 1952) was Sri Lanka's former Cabinet Minister of Child Development and Women's Affairs and a Member of Parliament representing the Anuradhapura District.

He is an Agriculturist by profession and was educated at Nalanda College Colombo.

== See also ==
- Cabinet of Sri Lanka
