= P. D. N. K. Palihena =

Sri Lankan politician and academic

Hon. Nirmal Palihena MP
- නිර්මල් පලිහේන நிர்மல் பாலிகேனா
- Incumbent
- Assumed office 21 November 2024
- President: Anura Kumara Dissanayake
- Prime Minister: Harini Amarasuriya

Member of Parliament for Anuradhapura District
- Majority: 52,507 Preferential votes

Personal details
- Born: 15 September 1974 (age 52)
- Party: National People's Power
- Education: University of Sri Jayewardenepura, Rajarata University of Sri Lanka, University of Kelaniya
- Occupation: Senior Lecturer

P. D. N. K. Palihena is a Sri Lankan politician and academic who serves as a Member of Parliament for the Anuradhapura Electoral District. He was elected during the 2024 Sri Lankan parliamentary election, securing 52,507 preferential votes. He is affiliated with the National People's Power (NPP) political coalition and is a national executive committee member of the party.

== See also ==
- 2024 Sri Lankan parliamentary election
- National People's Power
- Parliament of Sri Lanka
