= Mihintale Polling Division =

Mihintale
- Polling Division
- Coordinates: 8.216882°N 80.502953°E
- Country: Sri Lanka
- Province: North Central Province, Sri Lanka
- Electoral District: Anuradhapura Electoral District

Area
  - Total: 844.37 km^{2} (326.01 sq mi)

Population (2012)
  - Total: 196,313
  - Density: 232/km^{2} (600/sq mi)
- ISO 3166 code: EC-17F

The Mihintale Polling Division is a Polling Division in the Anuradhapura Electoral District, in the North Central Province, Sri Lanka.

== Presidential Election Results ==
=== Summary ===
Mihintale has historically been a Bellwether for Presidential Elections.

Year	Mihintale	Anuradhapura Electoral District	MAE %	Sri Lanka	MAE %
2019	SLPP	SLPP	1.34%	SLPP	5.23%
2015	UPFA	UPFA	0.86%	NDF	5.00%
2010	UPFA	UPFA	1.09%	UPFA	7.12%
2005	UPFA	UPFA	1.20%	UPFA	5.95%
1999	PA	PA	1.68%	PA	1.12%
1994	PA	PA	0.32%	PA	1.96%
1988	UNP	SLFP	6.04%	UNP	2.62%
1982	UNP	UNP	2.45%	UNP	5.98%
Matches/Mean MAE	7/8	6/8	1.87%	8/8	4.37%

=== 2019 Sri Lankan Presidential Election ===
Party	Mihintale		Anuradhapura Electoral District		Sri Lanka	
Party	Votes	%	Votes	%	Votes	%
SLPP	30,815	57.36%	342,223	58.97%	6,924,255	52.25%
NDF	19,320	35.96%	202,348	34.87%	5,564,239	41.99%
NMPP	2,245	4.18%	22,879	3.94%	418,553	3.16%
Other Parties (with < 1%)	1,343	2.50%	12,896	2.22%	345,452	2.61%
Valid Votes	53,723	99.15%	580,346	99.16%	13,252,499	98.99%
Rejected Votes	461	0.85%	4,916	0.84%	135,452	1.01%
Total Polled	54,184	83.60%	585,262	85.76%	13,387,951	83.71%
Registered Electors	64,810		682,450		15,992,568	

=== 2015 Sri Lankan Presidential Election ===
Party	Mihintale		Anuradhapura Electoral District		Sri Lanka	
Party	Votes	%	Votes	%	Votes	%
UPFA	26,032	52.71%	281,161	53.59%	5,768,090	47.58%
NDF	22,860	46.28%	238,407	45.44%	6,217,162	51.28%
Other Parties (with < 1%)	498	1.01%	5,065	0.97%	138,200	1.14%
Valid Votes	49,390	99.18%	524,633	99.15%	12,123,452	98.85%
Rejected Votes	406	0.82%	4,500	0.85%	140,925	1.15%
Total Polled	49,796	76.87%	529,133	77.71%	12,264,377	78.69%
Registered Electors	64,778		680,877		15,585,942	

=== 2010 Sri Lankan Presidential Election ===
Party	Mihintale		Anuradhapura Electoral District		Sri Lanka	
Party	Votes	%	Votes	%	Votes	%
UPFA	27,619	65.09%	298,448	66.32%	6,015,934	57.88%
NDF	13,928	32.83%	143,761	31.94%	4,173,185	40.15%
Other Parties (with < 1%)	882	2.08%	7,829	1.74%	204,494	1.97%
Valid Votes	42,429	99.16%	450,038	99.17%	10,393,613	99.03%
Rejected Votes	358	0.84%	3,785	0.83%	101,838	0.97%
Total Polled	42,787	72.35%	453,823	73.65%	10,495,451	66.70%
Registered Electors	59,137		616,186		15,734,587	

=== 2005 Sri Lankan Presidential Election ===
Party	Mihintale		Anuradhapura Electoral District		Sri Lanka	
Party	Votes	%	Votes	%	Votes	%
UPFA	22,454	56.24%	231,040	55.08%	4,887,152	50.29%
UNP	16,897	42.32%	182,956	43.62%	4,706,366	48.43%
Other Parties (with < 1%)	574	1.44%	5,438	1.30%	123,521	1.27%
Valid Votes	39,925	98.94%	419,434	98.92%	9,717,039	98.88%
Rejected Votes	429	1.06%	4,563	1.08%	109,869	1.12%
Total Polled	40,354	73.97%	423,997	75.41%	9,826,908	69.51%
Registered Electors	54,554		562,259		14,136,979	

=== 1999 Sri Lankan Presidential Election ===
Party	Mihintale		Anuradhapura Electoral District		Sri Lanka	
Party	Votes	%	Votes	%	Votes	%
PA	18,131	52.26%	189,073	54.14%	4,312,157	51.12%
UNP	14,393	41.49%	139,180	39.86%	3,602,748	42.71%
JVP	1,508	4.35%	14,612	4.18%	343,927	4.08%
Other Parties (with < 1%)	661	1.91%	6,336	1.81%	176,679	2.09%
Valid Votes	34,693	97.90%	349,201	98.05%	8,435,754	97.69%
Rejected Votes	743	2.10%	6,949	1.95%	199,536	2.31%
Total Polled	35,436	75.77%	356,150	75.63%	8,635,290	72.17%
Registered Electors	46,770		470,907		11,965,536	

=== 1994 Sri Lankan Presidential Election ===
Party	Mihintale		Anuradhapura Electoral District		Sri Lanka	
Party	Votes	%	Votes	%	Votes	%
PA	19,935	64.32%	200,146	63.99%	4,709,205	62.28%
UNP	10,541	34.01%	107,342	34.32%	2,715,283	35.91%
Other Parties (with < 1%)	516	1.66%	5,309	1.70%	137,040	1.81%
Valid Votes	30,992	98.16%	312,797	98.05%	7,561,526	98.03%
Rejected Votes	581	1.84%	6,205	1.95%	151,706	1.97%
Total Polled	31,573	76.84%	319,002	76.16%	7,713,232	69.12%
Registered Electors	41,088		418,857		11,158,880	

=== 1988 Sri Lankan Presidential Election ===
Party	Mihintale		Anuradhapura Electoral District		Sri Lanka	
Party	Votes	%	Votes	%	Votes	%
UNP	4,027	49.21%	56,951	42.94%	2,569,199	50.43%
SLFP	4,018	49.10%	73,154	55.15%	2,289,857	44.95%
SLMP	138	1.69%	2,529	1.91%	235,701	4.63%
Valid Votes	8,183	97.49%	132,634	98.36%	5,094,754	98.24%
Rejected Votes	211	2.51%	2,207	1.64%	91,499	1.76%
Total Polled	8,394	24.94%	134,841	40.18%	5,186,256	55.87%
Registered Electors	33,651		335,551		9,283,143	

=== 1982 Sri Lankan Presidential Election ===
Party	Mihintale		Anuradhapura Electoral District		Sri Lanka	
Party	Votes	%	Votes	%	Votes	%
UNP	11,300	46.46%	117,873	49.84%	3,450,815	52.93%
SLFP	10,965	45.08%	102,973	43.54%	2,546,348	39.05%
JVP	1,813	7.45%	13,911	5.88%	273,428	4.19%
Other Parties (with < 1%)	244	1.00%	1,766	0.75%	249,460	3.83%
Valid Votes	24,322	98.99%	236,523	99.04%	6,520,156	98.78%
Rejected Votes	249	1.01%	2,294	0.96%	80,470	1.22%
Total Polled	24,571	85.43%	238,817	84.68%	6,600,626	80.15%
Registered Electors	28,761		282,018		8,235,358	

== Parliamentary Election Results ==
=== Summary ===
Mihintale has historycally been a Bellwether for Parliamentary Elections.

Year	Mihintale	Anuradhapura Electoral District	MAE %	Sri Lanka	MAE %
2015	UPFA	UPFA	0.59%	UNP	3.55%
2010	UPFA	UPFA	3.30%	UPFA	8.32%
2004	UPFA	UPFA	0.62%	UPFA	6.63%
2001	UNP	UNP	0.92%	UNP	2.24%
2000	PA	PA	0.69%	PA	1.30%
1994	PA	PA	0.55%	PA	3.84%
1989	UNP	UNP	5.32%	UNP	2.80%
Matches/Mean MAE	6/7	6/7	1.71%	7/7	4.10%

=== 2015 Sri Lankan Parliamentary Election ===
Party	Mihintale		Anuradhapura Electoral District		Sri Lanka	
Party	Votes	%	Votes	%	Votes	%
UPFA	21,495	48.86%	229,856	48.39%	4,732,664	42.48%
UNP	19,395	44.09%	213,072	44.85%	5,098,916	45.77%
JVP	2,746	6.24%	28,701	6.04%	544,154	4.88%
Other Parties (with < 1%)	357	0.81%	3,418	0.72%	80,543	0.72%
Valid Votes	43,993	93.89%	475,047	94.28%	11,140,333	95.35%
Rejected Votes	2,837	6.05%	28,462	5.65%	516,926	4.42%
Total Polled	46,857	72.33%	503,845	79.13%	11,684,111	77.66%
Registered Electors	64,778		636,733		15,044,490	

=== 2010 Sri Lankan Parliamentary Election ===
Party	Mihintale		Anuradhapura Electoral District		Sri Lanka	
Party	Votes	%	Votes	%	Votes	%
UPFA	21,291	70.56%	221,204	66.52%	4,846,388	60.38%
UNP	6,645	22.02%	80,360	24.17%	2,357,057	29.37%
DNA	1,752	5.81%	18,129	5.45%	441,251	5.50%
SMBP	377	1.25%	11,445	3.44%	12,166	0.15%
Other Parties (with < 1%)	110	0.36%	1,400	0.42%	18,658	0.23%
Valid Votes	30,175	92.72%	332,538	93.55%	8,026,322	96.03%
Rejected Votes	2,370	7.28%	22,930	6.45%	581,465	6.96%
Total Polled	32,545	55.03%	355,468	57.35%	8,358,246	59.29%
Registered Electors	59,137		619,845		14,097,690	

=== 2004 Sri Lankan Parliamentary Election ===
Party	Mihintale		Anuradhapura Electoral District		Sri Lanka	
Party	Votes	%	Votes	%	Votes	%
UPFA	21,008	58.07%	212,943	57.22%	4,223,126	45.70%
UNP	14,336	39.63%	148,612	39.94%	3,486,792	37.73%
JHU	602	1.66%	8,034	2.16%	552,723	5.98%
Other Parties (with < 1%)	232	0.64%	2,536	0.68%	51,070	0.55%
Valid Votes	36,178	94.14%	372,125	94.59%	9,241,931	94.52%
Rejected Votes	2,253	5.86%	21,281	5.41%	534,452	5.47%
Total Polled	38,431	72.83%	393,406	76.52%	9,777,821	75.74%
Registered Electors	52,770		514,149		12,909,631	

=== 2001 Sri Lankan Parliamentary Election ===
Party	Mihintale		Anuradhapura Electoral District		Sri Lanka	
Party	Votes	%	Votes	%	Votes	%
UNP	15,669	44.70%	165,055	45.93%	4,086,026	45.62%
PA	14,429	41.17%	149,393	41.57%	3,330,815	37.19%
JVP	4,488	12.80%	40,005	11.13%	815,353	9.10%
Other Parties (with < 1%)	465	1.33%	4,891	1.36%	108,710	1.21%
Valid Votes	35,051	94.07%	359,344	94.78%	8,955,844	94.77%
Rejected Votes	2,211	5.93%	19,796	5.22%	494,009	5.23%
Total Polled	37,262	74.34%	379,140	77.41%	9,449,878	76.03%
Registered Electors	50,126		489,776		12,428,762	

=== 2000 Sri Lankan Parliamentary Election ===
Party	Mihintale		Anuradhapura Electoral District		Sri Lanka	
Party	Votes	%	Votes	%	Votes	%
PA	16,577	47.97%	169,424	48.30%	3,899,329	45.33%
UNP	13,850	40.08%	144,662	41.24%	3,451,765	40.12%
JVP	2,208	6.39%	21,274	6.06%	518,725	6.03%
NUA	1,375	3.98%	9,369	2.67%	185,593	2.16%
Other Parties (with < 1%)	544	1.57%	6,042	1.72%	245,927	2.86%
Valid Votes	34,554	N/A	350,771	N/A	8,602,617	N/A

=== 1994 Sri Lankan Parliamentary Election ===
Party	Mihintale		Anuradhapura Electoral District		Sri Lanka	
Party	Votes	%	Votes	%	Votes	%
PA	17,881	55.77%	180,454	55.19%	3,887,805	48.94%
UNP	13,762	42.93%	142,084	43.45%	3,498,370	44.04%
Other Parties (with < 1%)	417	1.30%	4,446	1.36%	158,616	2.00%
Valid Votes	32,060	95.04%	326,984	95.72%	7,943,688	95.20%
Rejected Votes	1,673	4.96%	14,620	4.28%	400,395	4.80%
Total Polled	33,733	82.10%	341,604	81.54%	8,344,095	74.75%
Registered Electors	41,088		418,959		11,163,064	

=== 1989 Sri Lankan Parliamentary Election ===
Party	Mihintale		Anuradhapura Electoral District		Sri Lanka	
Party	Votes	%	Votes	%	Votes	%
UNP	4,961	48.63%	92,726	56.39%	2,838,005	50.71%
SLFP	3,786	37.11%	64,010	38.92%	1,785,369	31.90%
IND	1,217	11.93%	4,057	2.47%	12,285	0.22%
Other Parties (with < 1%)	126	1.24%	1,928	1.17%	158,203	2.83%
USA	112	1.10%	1,724	1.05%	141,983	2.54%
Valid Votes	10,202	89.18%	164,445	92.03%	5,596,468	93.87%
Rejected Votes	1,238	10.82%	14,245	7.97%	365,563	6.13%
Total Polled	11,440	34.37%	178,690	53.49%	5,962,031	63.60%
Registered Electors	33,289		334,073		9,374,164	

== Demographics ==
=== Ethnicity ===
The Mihintale Polling Division has a Sinhalese majority (91.7%) . In comparison, the Anuradhapura Electoral District (which contains the Mihintale Polling Division) has a Sinhalese majority (91.0%)

Ethnicity in Mihintale
1. Sinhalese (91.7%)
2. Moor (7.60%)
3. Other (0.70%)

=== Religion ===
The Mihintale Polling Division has a Buddhist majority (90.2%) . In comparison, the Anuradhapura Electoral District (which contains the Mihintale Polling Division) has a Buddhist majority (90.1%)

Religion in Mihintale
1. Buddhist (90.2%)
2. Muslim (7.80%)
3. Roman Catholic (1.30%)
4. Other (0.70%)
