= K. H. Nandasena =

Sri Lankan politician (1954–2024)

Hon. K. H. Nandasena
- කේ.එචි. නන්දසේන கே.எச். நந்தசேனா

Member of the Parliament of Sri Lanka
- In office 20 August 2020 – 4 April 2024
- Succeeded by: M. G. Weerasena
- Constituency: Anuradhapura District

Member of the North Central Provincial Council
- In office 1999–2017
- Constituency: Anuradhapura District

Personal details
- Born: Kidagalegama Hethuhamige Nandasena; 20 September 1954 Dominion of Ceylon (now Sri Lanka)
- Died: 4 April 2024 (aged 69) Anuradhapura, Sri Lanka
- Party: Sri Lanka Podujana Peramuna
- Other political affiliations: Sri Lanka People's Freedom Alliance

Kidagalegama Hethuhamige Nandasena (Sinhala: කේ.එචි. නන්දසේන, Tamil: கே.எச். நந்தசேனா; 20 September 1954 – 4 April 2024) was a Sri Lankan politician, former provincial minister and Member of Parliament.

Nandasena was born on 20 September 1954. He was a member of Padaviya Divisional Council and the North Central Provincial Council, where he held a provincial ministerial portfolio. He was dismissed from his ministerial position in May 2017 after attending a May Day rally hosted by the Joint Opposition. He contested in the 2020 parliamentary election as a candidate of the Sri Lanka People's Freedom Alliance for the Anuradhapura District and was elected to the Parliament of Sri Lanka.

Nandasena died from an unspecified, sudden illness on 4 April 2024, at the age of 69. Prior to his death, he had been receiving medical treatment at the Anuradhapura Teaching Hospital.

Electoral history of K. H. Nandasena
Election	Constituency	Party	Alliance	Votes	Result
1999 provincial	Anuradhapura District		People's Alliance	16,247	Elected
2004 provincial	Anuradhapura District		United People's Freedom Alliance	24,054	Elected
2008 provincial	Anuradhapura District		United People's Freedom Alliance		Elected
2012 provincial	Anuradhapura District		United People's Freedom Alliance	24,324	Elected
2020 parliamentary	Anuradhapura District	Sri Lanka Podujana Peramuna	Sri Lanka People's Freedom Alliance	53,618	Elected

== See also ==
- List of members of the Sri Lankan Parliament who died in office
