= 16th Parliament of Sri Lanka =

2020–2024 meeting of the Sri Lankan legislature

←	15th	17th	→

Overview
- Legislative body: Parliament of Sri Lanka
- Meeting place: Sri Lankan Parliament Building
- Term: 20 August 2020 – 24 September 2024
- Election: 5 August 2020
- Website: parliament.lk

Parliamentarians
- Members: 225
- Speaker: Mahinda Yapa Abeywardena (SLPP)
- Deputy Speaker and Chairman of Committees: Ranjith Siyambalapitiya (SLFP) (2020–22); Ajith Rajapaksa (SLPP) (2022–24)
- Deputy Chairman of Committees: Angajan Ramanathan (SLFP)
- Prime Minister: Mahinda Rajapaksa (SLPP) (2020–22); Ranil Wickremesinghe (UNP) (2022); Dinesh Gunawardena (SLPP) (2022–24); Harini Amarasuriya (NPP) (2024)
- Leader of the Opposition: Sajith Premadasa (SJB)
- Leader of the House: Dinesh Gunawardena (SLPP) (2020–22); Susil Premajayantha (SLPP) (2022–24)
- Chief Government Whip: Johnston Fernando (SLPP) (2020–22); Prasanna Ranatunga (SLPP) (2022–24)
- Chief Opposition Whip: Lakshman Kiriella (SJB)

Structure

Sessions
- 1st: 20 August 2020 – 12 December 2021
- 2nd: 18 January 2022 – 28 July 2022
- 3rd: 3 August 2022 – 27 January 2023
- 4th: 8 February 2023 – 26 January 2024
- 5th: 7 February 2024 – 24 September 2024

The 16th Parliament of Sri Lanka, known officially as the 9th Parliament of the Democratic Socialist Republic of Sri Lanka, was the meeting of the Parliament of Sri Lanka with its membership determined by the results of the 2020 parliamentary election held on 5 August 2020. The parliament met for the first time on 20 August 2020 and was dissolved on 24 September 2024.

== Election ==
Winners of polling divisions ■ SLPFA ■ SJB ■ TNA ■ SLFP ■ EPDP ■ Other parties

The 16th parliamentary election was held on 5 August 2020. The incumbent Sri Lanka People's Freedom Alliance claimed a landslide victory in the election claiming the majority winning 145 seats, while the newly formed Samagi Jana Balawegaya won a total of 54 seats and the National People's Power won 3 seats. The main opposition United National Party suffered their worst ever landslide defeat in history, claiming only one national seat and receiving the fifth most votes in the elections.

=== Results ===
The first official results were released on 6 August 2020 in the afternoon starting with the postal votes in the Galle District.

The SLPFA became the largest group in Parliament after securing 59.09% of votes and 145 seats whilst the SJB won 23.90% of votes and 54 seats. SLPFA managed to exceed the majority cutoff of 113 with obtaining 128 seats from election votes and 17 seats from the national list.

=== National ===
Summary of the 2020 Sri Lankan parliamentary election
Alliances and parties	Votes	%	Seats			
Alliances and parties	Votes	%	District	National	Total	+/–
Sri Lanka People's Freedom Alliance (Note: The SLPFA contested under the name and symbol of SLPP.): Ceylon Workers' Congress; Mahajana Eksath Peramuna; National Congress (Note: The NC contested separately in two districts (Ampara and Polonnaruwa) and with the SLPFA in other districts.); National Freedom Front; Pivithuru Hela Urumaya; Socialist Alliance; Communist Party of Sri Lanka; Democratic Left Front (Note: The DLF contested separately in two districts (Jaffna and Vanni) and with the SLPFA in other districts.); Lanka Sama Samaja Party (Note: The LSSP contested separately in one district (Jaffna) and with the SLPFA in other districts.); National Liberation People's Party; Sri Lanka People's Party; Sri Lanka Freedom Party (Note: The SLFP contested separately in three districts (Jaffna, Kalutara and Nuwara Eliya) and with the SLPFA in other districts.); Sri Lanka Podujana Peramuna	6,853,690	59.09%	128	17	145	▲50
Samagi Jana Balawegaya: All Ceylon Makkal Congress (Note: The ACMC contested separately in one district (Ampara) and with the SJB in other districts.); Jathika Hela Urumaya; Sri Lanka Muslim Congress (Note: The SLMC contested separately in one district (Batticaloa) and with the SJB in other districts.); Tamil Progressive Alliance; National Union of Workers; United Progressive Alliance; Democratic People's Front; Up-Country People's Front; United National Party (Sajith wing)	2,771,980	23.90%	47	7	54	New
Tamil National Alliance (Note: The TNA contested under the name and symbol of ITAK.): Illankai Tamil Arasu Kachchi; People's Liberation Organisation of Tamil Eelam; Tamil Eelam Liberation Organization	327,168	2.82%	9	1	10	▼6
National People's Power: Janatha Vimukthi Peramuna	445,958	3.84%	2	1	3	▼3
Tamil National People's Front (Note: The TNPF contested under the name and symbol of ACTC.): All Ceylon Tamil Congress	67,766	0.58%	1	1	2	▲2
Eelam People's Democratic Party	61,464	0.53%	2	0	2	▲1
United National Party (Ranil wing)	249,435	2.15%	0	1	1	▼105
Our Power of People's Party: Bodu Bala Sena	67,758	0.58%	0	1	1	▲1
Tamil Makkal Viduthalai Pulikal	67,692	0.58%	1	0	1	▲1
Sri Lanka Freedom Party	66,579	0.57%	1	0	1	▲1
Muslim National Alliance	55,981	0.48%	1	0	1	▲1
Tamil People's National Alliance: Eelam People's Revolutionary Liberation Front; Eelam Tamil Self Rule Party; Tamil National Party; Tamil People's Council	51,301	0.44%	1	0	1	▲1
All Ceylon Makkal Congress	43,319	0.37%	1	0	1	▲1
National Congress	39,272	0.34%	1	0	1	▲1
Sri Lanka Muslim Congress	34,428	0.30%	1	0	1	Steady
Independents	223,622	1.93%	0	0	0	Steady
United Peace Alliance	31,054	0.27%	0	0	0	Steady
All Lanka Tamil Mahasabha	30,031	0.26%	0	0	0	Steady
National Development Front	14,686	0.13%	0	0	0	Steady
Frontline Socialist Party	14,522	0.13%	0	0	0	Steady
Social Democratic Party of Tamils	11,464	0.10%	0	0	0	Steady
Tamil United Liberation Front	9,855	0.08%	0	0	0	Steady
Socialist Party of Sri Lanka	9,368	0.08%	0	0	0	Steady
People's Welfare Front	7,361	0.06%	0	0	0	Steady
Sinhalese National Front	5,056	0.04%	0	0	0	Steady
New Democratic Front	4,883	0.04%	0	0	0	Steady
United Left Front	4,879	0.04%	0	0	0	Steady
Liberal Democratic Party (Sri Lanka)	4,345	0.04%	0	0	0	Steady
National People's Party	3,813	0.03%	0	0	0	Steady
Democratic United National Front	3,611	0.03%	0	0	0	Steady
National Democratic Front	3,488	0.03%	0	0	0	Steady
Sri Lanka Labour Party	3,134	0.03%	0	0	0	Steady
Democratic Left Front	2,964	0.03%	0	0	0	Steady
New Sinhala Heritage	1,397	0.01%	0	0	0	Steady
United Socialist Party	1,189	0.01%	0	0	0	Steady
Motherland People's Party	1,087	0.01%	0	0	0	Steady
Eelavar Democratic Front	1,035	0.01%	0	0	0	Steady
Socialist Equality Party	780	0.01%	0	0	0	Steady
Lanka Sama Samaja Party	737	0.01%	0	0	0	Steady
All Are Citizens All Are Kings Organization	632	0.01%	0	0	0	Steady
Democratic Unity Alliance	145	0.00%	0	0	0	Steady
Independents					42	
Valid Votes	11,598,929	100.00%	196	29	225	Steady
Rejected Votes	744,373	6.03%				
Total Polled	12,343,302	75.89%				
Registered Electors	16,263,885					
Footnotes:

=== District ===
Districts won by SJB
Districts won by SLPFA
Districts won by TNA

District results for the 2020 Sri Lankan parliamentary election
Electoral District	Province	SLPFA			SJB			TNA			NPP			Others			Total			Turnout
Electoral District	Province	Votes	%	Seats	Votes	%	Seats	Votes	%	Seats	Votes	%	Seats	Votes	%	Seats	Votes	%	Seats	Turnout
Ampara	Eastern	126,012	32.65%	3	102,274	26.50%	2	25,255	6.54%	0	5,060	1.31%	0	127,396	33.00%	2	385,997	100.00%	7	78.28%
Anuradhapura	North Central	344,458	67.95%	7	119,788	23.63%	2	-	-	-	24,492	4.83%	0	18,164	3.58%	0	506,902	100.00%	9	78.19%
Badulla	Uva	309,538	62.06%	6	144,290	28.93%	3	-	-	-	19,308	3.87%	0	25,659	5.14%	0	498,795	100.00%	9	80.43%
Batticaloa	Eastern	33,424	11.22%	1	28,362	9.52%	0	79,460	26.66%	2	348	0.12%	0	156,418	52.49%	2	298,012	100.00%	5	76.83%
Colombo	Western	674,603	57.04%	12	387,145	32.73%	6	-	-	-	67,600	5.72%	1	53,428	4.52%	0	1,182,776	100.00%	19	73.94%
Galle	Southern	430,334	70.54%	7	115,456	18.93%	2	-	-	-	29,963	4.91%	0	34,299	5.62%	0	610,052	100.00%	9	74.43%
Gampaha	Western	807,896	65.76%	13	285,809	23.27%	4	-	-	-	61,833	5.03%	1	72,936	5.94%	0	1,228,474	100.00%	18	73.01%
Hambantota	Southern	280,881	75.10%	6	51,758	13.84%	1	-	-	-	31,362	8.39%	0	10,016	2.68%	0	374,017	100.00%	7	79.68%
Jaffna	Northern	-	-	-	13,564	3.78%	0	112,967	31.46%	3	853	0.24%	0	231,746	64.53%	4	359,130	100.00%	7	68.92%
Kalutara	Western	448,699	64.08%	8	171,988	24.56%	2	-	-	-	33,434	4.77%	0	46,135	6.59%	0	700,256	100.00%	10	76.79%
Kandy	Central	477,446	58.76%	8	234,523	28.86%	4	-	-	-	22,997	2.83%	0	77,612	9.55%	0	812,578	100.00%	12	77.02%
Kegalle	Sabaragamuwa	331,573	66.29%	7	131,317	26.25%	2	-	-	-	14,033	2.81%	0	23,284	4.65%	0	500,207	100.00%	9	76.70%
Kurunegala	North Western	649,965	66.92%	11	244,860	25.21%	4	-	-	-	36,290	3.74%	0	40,128	4.13%	0	971,243	100.00%	15	75.45%
Matale	Central	188,779	65.53%	4	73,955	25.67%	1	-	-	-	7,542	2.62%	0	17,797	6.18%	0	288,073	100.00%	5	76.69%
Matara	Southern	352,217	73.63%	6	72,740	15.21%	1	-	-	-	37,136	7.76%	0	16,286	3.40%	0	478,379	100.00%	7	75.95%
Monaragala	Uva	208,193	74.12%	5	54,147	19.28%	1	-	-	-	11,429	4.07%	0	7,116	2.53%	0	280,885	100.00%	6	80.93%
Nuwara Eliya	Central	230,389	54.47%	5	132,008	31.21%	3	-	-	-	5,043	1.19%	0	55,537	13.13%	0	422,977	100.00%	8	80.49%
Polonnaruwa	North Central	180,847	73.66%	4	47,781	19.46%	1	-	-	-	6,792	2.77%	0	10,099	4.11%	0	245,519	100.00%	5	78.99%
Puttalam	North Western	220,566	57.26%	5	80,183	20.81%	2	-	-	-	9,944	2.58%	0	74,528	19.35%	1	385,221	100.00%	8	67.47%
Ratnapura	Sabaragamuwa	446,668	68.86%	8	155,759	24.01%	3	-	-	-	17,611	2.72%	0	28,576	4.41%	0	648,614	100.00%	11	77.38%
Trincomalee	Eastern	68,681	32.25%	1	86,394	40.56%	2	39,570	18.58%	1	2,226	1.05%	0	16,121	7.57%	0	212,992	100.00%	4	78.62%
Vanni	Northern	42,524	20.46%	1	37,883	18.23%	1	69,916	33.64%	3	662	0.32%	0	56,852	27.35%	1	207,837	100.00%	6	78.34%
National List				17			7			1			1			3			29	
Total		6,853,693	59.09%	145	2,771,984	23.90%	54	327,168	2.82%	10	445,958	3.84%	3	1,200,133	2.15%	13	11,598,936	91.80%	225	75.89%

== Government ==
The Sri Lanka People's Freedom Alliance was able to form a government with a firm supermajority, with Mahinda Rajapaksa as prime minister.

Amidst nationwide protests in 2022, Mahinda Rajapaksa resigned and Ranil Wickremesinghe was appointed as his successor.

On 13 July 2022, President Gotabaya Rajapaksa fled the country and resigned on 14 July 2022. Ranil Wickremesinghe was elected president by the parliament on 20 July and Dinesh Gunawardena was appointed as prime minister by president Wickremesinghe.

On 5 March 2024, the main opposition party Samagi Jana Balawegaya handed over a no-confidence motion against Speaker of the Parliament Mahinda Yapa Abeywardena, claiming that his actions failed to protect the Constitution of Sri Lanka by allowing the signature of the Online Safety Bill. The motion was debated from 19 to 21 March, and was defeated with 75 votes for and 117 votes against.

On 23 September 2024, Prime Minister Gunawardena resigned, following NPP leader Anura Kumara Dissanayake's victory in the 2024 Sri Lankan presidential election and subsequent inauguration. The following day, Dissanayake appointed Harini Amarasuriya as prime minister. The same day, Dissanayake dissolved the parliament and called for snap parliamentary elections in November 2024.

== Legislation ==
- The 20th Amendment to the Constitution of Sri Lanka was passed in October 2020.
- The 21st Amendment to the Constitution of Sri Lanka was passed in October 2022.
- The Online Safety Bill was passed in January 2024.

== Composition ==
The following are the changes in party and alliance affiliations for the 16th parliament.

- 5 April 2022 − 9 SLPP MPs and 16 more MPs formerly allied with the SLPFA government leave the government to work as independent MPs. The 14 SLFP MPs, 2 CWC MPs and ACMC MP Muszhaaraff Muthunabeen leave the SLPFA government and cross over to the opposition.
- 12 May 2022 − UNP MP Ranil Wickremesinghe is appointed as Prime Minister and joins the SLPFA government.
- 31 August 2022 − 13 SLPP MPs leave the government and cross over to the opposition as independent MPs, including SLPP chairman G. L. Peiris and SLPP MP Dullas Alahapperuma.
- 15 November 2022 – 6 SLPP MPs leave the government and join the SJB.
- 18 July 2023 – 2 SJB MPs (Harin Fernando and Manusha Nanayakkara) are expelled from their party for their support for the government. The 2 MPs cross over to the government as independent MPs, and are readmitted into the UNP a month later.
- 6 October 2023 – SLMC MP Ahamed Nazeer Zainulabdeen is expelled from his party and loses his parliamentary seat for his support for the government. His replacement sides with the opposition, thus resulting in one seat less for the government.
- 1 January 2024 – SLFP MP Shan Wijayalal De Silva crosses over to the SJB.

== Members ==
=== Deaths and resignations ===
- 7 April 2021 – Ranjan Ramanayake (SJB/GAM) lost his seat after being jailed, replaced by Ajith Mannapperuma (SJB/GAM).
- 6 July 2021 – Jayantha Ketagoda (SLPFA/NAT) resigned, replaced by Basil Rajapaksa (SLPFA/NAT).
- 13 September 2021 – Ajith Nivard Cabraal (SLPFA/NAT) resigned to become Governor of the Central Bank of Sri Lanka, replaced by Jayantha Ketagoda (SLPFA/NAT).
- 25 November 2021 – Mahinda Samarasinghe (SLPFA/KAL) resigned to become Ambassador of Sri Lanka to the United States and Mexico, replaced by Lalith Varna Kumara (SLPFA/KAL).
- 9 May 2022 – Amarakeerthi Athukorala (SLPFA/POL) was beaten to death by a mob, replaced by Jagath Samarawickrama (SLPFA/POL).
- 9 June 2022 – Basil Rajapaksa (SLPFA/NAT) resigned, replaced by Dhammika Perera (SLPFA/NAT).
- 20 July 2022 – Ranil Wickremesinghe (UNP/NAT) vacated his seat after taking oaths as President of Sri Lanka, replaced by Wajira Abeywardane (UNP/NAT).
- 19 January 2023 – Mujibur Rahman (SJB/COL) resigned, replaced by A. H. M. Fowzie (SJB/COL).
- 6 October 2023 – Ahamed Nazeer Zainulabdeen (SLMC/BAT) was dismissed from his seat after being expelled from the Sri Lanka Muslim Congress, replaced by Seyed Ali Zahir Moulana (SLMC/BAT).
- 9 January 2024 – Chaminda Wijesiri (SJB/BAD) resigned, replaced by Nayana Wasalathilake (SJB/BAD).
- 25 January 2024 – Sanath Nishantha (SLPFA/PUT) died, replaced by Jagath Priyankara (NFF/PUT).
- 27 February 2024 – Uddika Premarathna (SLPFA/ANU) resigned, replaced by Sarath Chandrasiri Muthukumarana (SLPFA/ANU).
- 4 April 2024 – K. H. Nandasena (SLPFA/ANU) died, replaced by M. G. Weerasena (SLPFA/ANU).
- 8 May 2023 – Diana Gamage (SJB/NAT) was disqualified from her seat after the Supreme Court of Sri Lanka ruled she was not a Sri Lankan citizen, replaced by Mujibur Rahman (SJB/NAT).
- 30 June 2024 – R. Sampanthan (TNA/TRI) died, replaced by Kathiravelu Sanmugam Kuhadasan (TNA/TRI).
- 9 August 2024 – Manusha Nanayakkara (SJB/GAL) and Harin Fernando (SJB/NAT) were disqualified from their parliamentary seats after the Supreme Court of Sri Lanka ruled that they had been expelled from their party and had subsequently joined a different party. Nanayakkara was replaced by Bandula Lal Bandarigoda (SJB/GAL).
- 21 August 2024 – Thalatha Atukorale (SJB/RAT) resigned, replaced by Karu Paranawithana (SJB/RAT).
- 23 September 2024 – Anura Kumara Dissanayake (NPP/COL) vacated his seat after taking oaths as President of Sri Lanka, replaced by Lakshman Nipuna Arachchi (NPP/COL).

=== List ===
Name	^{Elect. Dist.}	^{Pref.} votes	Member From	Member To	Elected Party	Elected Alliance	Current Party	Current Alliance	Notes
Rohitha Abeygunawardena	KAL	147,472	20 August 2020		SLPP	SLPFA	SLPP	SLPFA	
Ashoka Abeysinghe	KUR	54,512	20 August 2020		SJB	SJB	SJB	SJB	
Rajika Wickramasinghe	KEG	68,802	20 August 2020		SLPP	SLPFA	SLPP	SLPFA	
Udayakantha Gunathilaka	KEG	46,628	20 August 2020		SLPP	SLPFA	SLPP	SLPFA	
Mahinda Yapa Abeywardena	MTR	80,595	20 August 2020		SLPP	SLPFA	SLPP	SLPFA	Speaker (20–24).
Basil Rajapaksa	NAT		8 July 2021	9 June 2022	SLPP	SLPFA	SLPP	SLPFA	Replaces Jayantha Ketagoda. Replaced by Dhammika Perera.
Dhammika Perera	NAT		22 June 2022		SLPP	SLPFA	SLPP	SLPFA	Replaces Basil Rajapaksa.
Selvam Adaikalanathan	VAN	18,563	20 August 2020		TELO	TNA	TELO	DTNA	
Lasantha Alagiyawanna	GAM	73,061	20 August 2020		SLFP	SLPFA	SLFP		
Dullas Alahapperuma	MTR	103,534	20 August 2020		SLPP	SLPFA	FPC	SJB	
J. C. Alawathuwala	KUR	65,956	20 August 2020		SJB	SJB	SJB	SJB	
Harini Amarasuriya	NAT		20 August 2020		JVP	NPP	JVP	NPP	Prime Minister (24)
Amarakeerthi Athukorala	POL	45,939	20 August 2020	9 May 2022	SLPP	SLPFA	SLPP	SLPFA	Replaced by Jagath Samarawickrama.
Rohana Dissanayake	MTL	50,368	20 August 2020		SLPP	SLPFA	SLPP	SLPFA	
Mahindananda Aluthgamage	KAN	161,471	20 August 2020		SLPP	SLPFA	SLPP	SLPFA	
Sudath Manjula	KEG	45,970	20 August 2020		SLPP	SLPFA	SLPP	SLPFA	
Gunapala Rathnasekara	KUR	141,991	20 August 2020		SLPP	SLPFA	FPC	SJB	
Tissa Attanayake	NAT		20 August 2020		SJB	SJB	SJB	SJB	
Mahinda Amaraweera	HAM	123,730	20 August 2020		SLFP	SLPFA	SLFP		
Dilum Amunugama	KAN	171,758	20 August 2020		SLPP	SLPFA	SLPP	SLPFA	
Nalaka Kottegoda	MTL	71,404	20 August 2020		SLPP	SLPFA	SLPP	SLPFA	
Kapila Nuwan Athukorala	TRI	30,056	20 August 2020		SLPP	SLPFA	SLPP	SLPFA	
Indika Anuruddha	GAM	136,297	20 August 2020		SLPP	SLPFA	SLPP	SLPFA	
Hector Appuhamy	PUT	34,127	20 August 2020		SJB	SJB	SJB	SJB	
A. Aravind Kumar	BAD	45,497	20 August 2020		UCPF	SJB	UCPF	SJB	
Thalatha Atukorale	RAT	45,105	20 August 2020	21 August 2024	SJB	SJB	SJB	SJB	
Risad Badhiutheen	VAN	28,203	20 August 2020		ACMC	SJB	ACMC	SJB	
Tharaka Balasuriya	KEG	96,763	20 August 2020		SLPP	SLPFA	SLPP	SLPFA	
Nalin Bandara	KUR	75,631	20 August 2020		SJB	SJB	SJB	SJB	
R. M. Ranjith Madduma Bandara	NAT		20 August 2020		SJB	SJB	SJB	SJB	
Rohana Bandara	ANU	39,520	20 August 2020		SJB	SJB	SJB	SJB	
Shantha Bandara	KUR	52,086	20 August 2020		SLPP	SLPFA	SLPP	SLPFA	
Sumith Udukumbura	KUR	51,134	20 August 2020		SLPP	SLPFA	SLPP	SLPFA	
Vijitha Berugoda	MON	68,984	20 August 2020		SLPP	SLPFA	SLPP	SLPFA	
D. V. Chanaka	HAM	128,805	20 August 2020		SLPP	SLPFA	SLPP	SLPFA	
S. M. Chandrasena	ANU	139,368	20 August 2020		SLPP	SLPFA	SLPP	SLPFA	
Chamara Sampath Dassanayake	BAD	66,393	20 August 2020		SLFP	SLPFA	SLFP		
W. H. M. Dharmasena	MON	20,662	20 August 2020		SJB	SJB	SJB	SJB	
Piyal Nishantha de Silva	KAL	103,904	20 August 2020		SLPP	SLPFA	SLPP	SLPFA	
Harsha de Silva	COL	82,845	20 August 2020		SJB	SJB	SJB	SJB	
Nimal Siripala de Silva	BAD	141,901	20 August 2020		SLFP	SLPFA	SLFP		
Akila Ellawala	RAT	71,179	20 August 2020		SLPP	SLPFA	SLPP	SLPFA	
Douglas Devananda	JAF	32,146	20 August 2020		EPDP		EPDP		
Palani Digambaran	NUW	83,392	20 August 2020		NUW	SJB	NUW	SJB	
Anura Kumara Dissanayake	COL	49,814	20 August 2020	23 September 2024	JVP	NPP	JVP	NPP	Elected President. Replaced by Lakshman Nipuna Arachchi.
Duminda Dissanayake	ANU	75,535	20 August 2020		SLFP	SLPFA	SLFP		
Mayantha Dissanayake	NAT		20 August 2020		SJB	SJB	SJB	SJB	
Kulasingam Thileepan	VAN	3,203	20 August 2020		EPDP		EPDP		
Sanjeeva Edirimanna	KAL	105,973	20 August 2020		SLPP	SLPFA	SLPP	SLPFA	
S. B. Dissanayake	NUW	66,045	20 August 2020		SLPP	SLPFA	SLPP	SLPFA	
Wimalaweera Dissanayake	AMP	63,594	20 August 2020		SLPP	SLPFA	SLPP	SLPFA	
Marjan Faleel	NAT		20 August 2020		SLPP	SLPFA	SLPP	SLPFA	
Cassim Faizal	AMP	29,423	20 August 2020		SLMC	SJB	SLMC	SJB	
Arundika Fernando	PUT	70,892	20 August 2020		SLPP	SLPFA	SLPP	SLPFA	
Harin Fernando	NAT		20 August 2020	9 August 2024	SJB	SJB	UNP		
Johnston Fernando	KUR	199,203	20 August 2020		SLPP	SLPFA	SLPP	SLPFA	Chief Government Whip (20–22)
Sudarshani Fernandopulle	GAM	89,329	20 August 2020		SLPP	SLPFA	Ind	SJB	
Sarath Fonseka	GAM	110,555	20 August 2020		SJB	SJB	SJB	SJB	
Lalith Ellawala	KAL	76,705	20 August 2020		SLPP	SLPFA	FPC	SJB	
Anupa Pasqual	KAL	97,777	20 August 2020		SLPP	SLPFA	SLPP	SLPFA	
Nalin Fernando	GAM	69,800	20 August 2020		SLPP	SLPFA	SLPP	SLPFA	
Diana Gamage	NAT		20 August 2020	8 May 2024	SJB	SJB	SJB	SJB	Replaced by Mujibur Rahman.
Jagath Pushpakumara	MON	66,176	20 August 2020		SLFP	SLPFA	SLFP		
A. L. M. Athaullah	AMP	35,697	20 August 2020		NC		NC		
Pramitha Tennakoon	MTL	67,776	20 August 2020		SLPP	SLPFA	SLPP	SLPFA	
Siripala Gamalath	POL	67,917	20 August 2020		SLPP	SLPFA	SLPP	SLPFA	
Udaya Gammanpila	COL	136,331	20 August 2020		PHU	SLPFA	PHU	ULS	
Mano Ganesan	COL	62,091	20 August 2020		DPF	SJB	DPF	SJB	
Upul Galappaththi	HAM	63,369	20 August 2020		SLPP	SLPFA	FPC	SJB	
Nalaka Godahewa	GAM	325,479	20 August 2020		SLPP	SLPFA	FPC	SJB	
Sudarshana Denipitiya	BAD	71,776	20 August 2020		SLPP	SLPFA	SLPP	SLPFA	
Kokila Gunawardena	GAM	77,922	20 August 2020		SLPP	SLPFA	SLPP	SLPFA	
Yadamini Gunawardena	NAT		20 August 2020		MEP	SLPFA	MEP	SLPFA	
Bandula Gunawardena	COL	96,057	20 August 2020		SLPP	SLPFA	SLPP	SLPFA	
Dinesh Gunawardena	COL	85,287	20 August 2020		MEP	SLPFA	MEP	SLPFA	Leader of the House (20–22); Prime Minister (22–24)
Rauff Hakeem	KAN	83,398	20 August 2020		SLMC	SJB	SLMC	SJB	
M. H. A. Haleem	KAN	71,063	20 August 2020		SJB	SJB	SJB	SJB	
H. M. M. Harees	AMP	36,850	20 August 2020		SLMC	SJB	SLMC	SJB	
Kabir Hashim	KEG	58,716	20 August 2020		SJB	SJB	SJB	SJB	
Kanaka Herath	KEG	128,592	20 August 2020		SLPP	SLPFA	SLPP	SLPFA	
Vijitha Herath	GAM	37,008	20 August 2020		JVP	NPP	JVP	NPP	
Charitha Herath	NAT		20 August 2020		SLPP	SLPFA	FPC	SJB	
Sivanesathurai Chandrakanthan	BAT	54,198	20 August 2020		TMVP		TMVP		
Thushara Indunil	KUR	49,364	20 August 2020		SJB	SJB	SJB	SJB	
Ishak Rahuman	ANU	49,298	20 August 2020		ACMC	SJB	ACMC	SJB	
Sisira Jayakody	GAM	113,130	20 August 2020		SLPP	SLPFA	SLPP	SLPFA	
Samanpriya Herath	KUR	66,814	20 August 2020		SLPP	SLPFA	SLPP	SLPFA	
D. B. Herath	KUR	61,954	20 August 2020		SLPP	SLPFA	SLPP	SLPFA	
Anuradha Jayaratne	KAN	140,798	20 August 2020		SLPP	SLPFA	SLPP	SLPFA	
Piyankara Jayaratne	PUT	74,425	20 August 2020		SLPP	SLPFA	Ind	SJB	
Dayasiri Jayasekara	KUR	112,452	20 August 2020		SLFP	SLPFA	SLFP		
Premalal Jayasekara	RAT	142,037	20 August 2020		SLPP	SLPFA	SLPP	SLPFA	
K. P. S. Kumarasiri	ANU	49,030	20 August 2020		SLPP	SLPFA	FPC	SJB	
Channa Jayasumana	ANU	133,980	20 August 2020		SLPP	SLPFA	FPC	SJB	
K. H. Nandasena	ANU	53,618	20 August 2020	4 April 2024	SLPP	SLPFA	SLPP	SLPFA	Replaced by M. G. Weerasena.
Milan Jayathilaka	GAM	68,449	20 August 2020		SLPP	SLPFA	SLPP	SLPFA	
Jayarathna Herath	KUR	54,351	20 August 2020		SLPP	SLPFA	Ind	SJB	
Kavinda Jayawardena	GAM	73,612	20 August 2020		SJB	SJB	SJB	SJB	
S. Kajendran	NAT		20 August 2020		ACTC	TNPF	ACTC	TNPF	
Rohini Kumari Wijerathna	MTL	27,587	20 August 2020		SJB	SJB	SJB	SJB	
Sagara Kariyawasam	NAT		20 August 2020		SLPP	SLPFA	SLPP	SLPFA	
Gayantha Karunatileka	GAL	50,097	20 August 2020		SJB	SJB	SJB	SJB	
Lakshman Kiriella	KAN	52,311	20 August 2020		SJB	SJB	SJB	SJB	Chief Opposition Whip (20–24).
Muszhaaraff Muthunabeen	AMP	18,389	20 August 2020		ACMC		ACMC		
Jagath Kumara	COL	47,693	20 August 2020		SLPP	SLPFA	SLPP	SLPFA	
Geetha Kumarasinghe	GAL	63,357	20 August 2020		SLPP	SLPFA	SLPP	SLPFA	
Asanka Navarathna	KUR	82,779	20 August 2020		SLMP	SLPFA	SLMP	ULS	
Nimal Lanza	GAM	108,945	20 August 2020		SLPP	SLPFA	SLPP	SLPFA	
Gamini Lokuge	COL	62,543	20 August 2020		SLPP	SLPFA	SLPP	SLPFA	
Imran Maharoof	TRI	39,029	20 August 2020		SJB	SJB	SJB	SJB	
Karunadasa Kodithuwakku	MTR	114,319	20 August 2020		SLPP	SLPFA	SLPP	SLPFA	
Wasantha Yapa Bandara	KAN	108,940	20 August 2020		SLPP	SLPFA	FPC	SJB	
Udayana Kirindigoda	KAN	39,904	20 August 2020		SLPP	SLPFA	FPC	SJB	
Gayashan Nawananda	MON	45,384	20 August 2020		SLPP	SLPFA	SLPP	SLPFA	
Gunathilaka Rajapaksha	KAN	49,317	20 August 2020		SLPP	SLPFA	SLPP	SLPFA	
Ajith Mannapperuma	GAM		9 April 2021		SJB	SJB	SJB	SJB	Replaces Ranjan Ramanayake.
S. M. Marikkar	COL	87,589	20 August 2020		SJB	SJB	SJB	SJB	
K. Kader Masthan	VAN	13,454	20 August 2020		SLFP	SLPFA	SLFP		
Imthiaz Bakeer Markar	NAT		20 August 2020		SJB	SJB	SJB	SJB	
Dushmantha Mithrapala	KEG	58,306	20 August 2020		SLPP	SLPFA	SLPP	SLPFA	
Mohamed Mussammil	NAT		20 August 2020		NFF	SLPFA	NFF	ULS	
Chinthaka Mayadunne	PUT	46,058	20 August 2020		SLPP	SLPFA	SLPP	SLPFA	
Vajira Abeywardena	NAT		22 July 2022		UNP		UNP		Replaces Ranil Wickremesinghe.
Manusha Nanayakkara	GAL	47,399	20 August 2020	9 August 2024	SJB	SJB	UNP		
Vasudeva Nanayakkara	RAT	66,991	20 August 2020		DLF	SLPFA	DLF	ULS	
Kins Nelson	POL	22,392	20 August 2020		SJB	SJB	SJB	SJB	
Ahamed Nazeer Zainulabdeen	BAT	17,599	20 August 2020	6 October 2023	SLMC		SLMC		Replaced by Seyed Ali Zahir Moulana.
Charles Nirmalanathan	VAN	25,668	20 August 2020		ITAK	TNA	ITAK	TNA	
Sanath Nishantha	PUT	80,082	20 August 2020	25 January 2024	SLPP	SLPFA	SLPP	SLPFA	Replaced by Jagath Priyankara.
Vino Noharathalingam	VAN	15,180	20 August 2020		TELO	TNA	TELO	DTNA	
Buddhika Pathirana	MTR	44,889	20 August 2020		SJB	SJB	SJB	SJB	
Ramesh Pathirana	GAL	205,814	20 August 2020		SLPP	SLPFA	SLPP	SLPFA	
G. L. Peiris	NAT		20 August 2020		SLPP	SLPFA	FPC	SJB	
Muditha Prishanthi	RAT	65,923	20 August 2020		SLPP	SLPFA	SLPP	SLPFA	
Dilan Perera	BAD	53,081	20 August 2020		SLFP	SLPFA	FPC	SJB	
Nipuna Ranawaka	MTR	131,010	20 August 2020		SLPP	SLPFA	SLPP	SLPFA	
Nimal Piyatissa	NUW	51,225	20 August 2020		NFF	SLPFA	NFF	ULS	
Niroshan Perera	PUT	31,636	20 August 2020		SJB	SJB	SJB	SJB	
Sujith Sanjaya Perera	KEG	28,082	20 August 2020		SJB	SJB	SJB	SJB	
Gajendrakumar Ponnambalam	JAF	31,658	20 August 2020		ACTC	TNPF	ACTC	TNPF	
Premnath C. Dolawaththa	COL	69,055	20 August 2020		SLPP	SLPFA	SLPP	SLPFA	
Pradeep Undugoda	COL	91,958	20 August 2020		SLPP	SLPFA	SLPP	SLPFA	
Sajith Premadasa	COL	305,744	20 August 2020		SJB	SJB	SJB	SJB	Leader of the Opposition (20–24).
Susil Premajayantha	COL	50,321	20 August 2020		SLPP	SLPFA	SLPP	SLPFA	Leader of the House (22–24)
Uddika Premarathna	ANU	133,550	20 August 2020	27 February 2024	NFF	SLPFA	NFF	ULS	Replaced by S. C. Muthukumarana.
Ashoka Priyantha	PUT	41,612	20 August 2020		SLPP	SLPFA	SLPP	SLPFA	
Weerasumana Weerasinghe	MTR	77,968	20 August 2020		CPSL	SLPFA	CPSL	ULS	
Velusami Radhakrishnan	NUW	72,167	20 August 2020		UCPF	SJB	UCPF	SJB	
Mujibur Rahman	COL	87,589	20 August 2020	19 January 2023	SJB	SJB	SJB	SJB	Replaced by A. H. M. Fowzie.
Harshana Rajakaruna	GAM	73,612	20 August 2020		SJB	SJB	SJB	SJB	
Chamal Rajapaksa	HAM	85,330	20 August 2020		SLPP	SLPFA	SLPP	SLPFA	
Mahinda Rajapaksa	KUR	527,364	20 August 2020		SLPP	SLPFA	SLPP	SLPFA	Prime Minister (20–22).
Namal Rajapaksa	HAM	166,660	20 August 2020		SLPP	SLPFA	SLPP	SLPFA	
Wijeyadasa Rajapakshe	COL	120,626	20 August 2020		SLPP	SLPFA	SLFP		
Angajan Ramanathan	JAF	36,365	20 August 2020		SLFP		SLFP		Deputy Chairman of Committees (22–24).
Ranjan Ramanayake	GAM	103,992	20 August 2020	7 April 2021	SJB	SJB	SJB	SJB	Replaced by Ajith Mannapperuma.
Keheliya Rambukwella	KAN	110,832	20 August 2020		SLPP	SLPFA	SLPP	SLPFA	
Roshan Ranasinghe	POL	90,615	20 August 2020		SLPP	SLPFA	SLPP	SLPFA	
Thilak Rajapaksha	AMP	54,203	20 August 2020		SLPP	SLPFA	FPC	SJB	
Prasanna Ranatunga	GAM	316,544	20 August 2020		SLPP	SLPFA	SLPP	SLPFA	Chief Government Whip (22–24)
Champika Ranawaka	COL	65,574	20 August 2020		JHU	SJB	URF	SJB	
Prasanna Ranaweera	GAM	83,203	20 August 2020		SLPP	SLPFA	SLPP	SLPFA	
Kumarasiri Rathnayake	MON	91,530	20 August 2020		SLPP	SLPFA	SLPP	SLPFA	
Suren Raghavan	NAT		20 August 2020		SLFP	SLPFA	SLFP		
C. B. Ratnayake	NUW	70,781	20 August 2020		SLPP	SLPFA	SLPP	SLPFA	
Ajith Nivard Cabraal	NAT		20 August 2020	13 September 2021	SLPP	SLPFA	SLPP	SLPFA	Replaced by Jayantha Ketagoda.
Jayantha Ketagoda	NAT		20 August 2020	6 July 2021	SLPP	SLPFA	SLPP	SLPFA	Replaced by Basil Rajapaksa.
Jayantha Ketagoda	NAT		13 September 2021		SLPP	SLPFA	SLPP	SLPFA	Replaces Ajith Nivard Cabraal.
Lohan Ratwatte	KAN	140,917	20 August 2020		SLPP	SLPFA	SLPP	SLPFA	
Isuru Dodangoda	GAL	71,266	20 August 2020		SLPP	SLPFA	SLPP	SLPFA	
Mahinda Samarasinghe	KAL	58,514	20 August 2020	25 November 2021	SLFP	SLPFA	SLFP	SLPFA	Replaced by Lalith Varna Kumara.
Shasheendra Rajapaksa	MON	104,729	20 August 2020		SLPP	SLPFA	SLPP	SLPFA	
Ali Sabry	NAT		20 August 2020		SLPP	SLPFA	SLPP	SLPFA	
Tiran Alles	NAT		20 August 2020		SLPP	SLPFA	SLPP	SLPFA	
Jayantha Samaraweera	KAL	100,386	20 August 2020		NFF	SLPFA	NFF	ULS	
Ali Sabri Raheem	PUT	33,509	20 August 2020		ACMC	MNA	ACMC	MNA	
R. Sampanthan	TRI	21,422	20 August 2020	30 June 2024	ITAK	TNA	ITAK	TNA	
Chaminda Sampath	GAL	128,331	20 August 2020		SLPP	SLPFA	SLPP	SLPFA	
Asanka Shehan Semasinghe	ANU	119,878	20 August 2020		SLPP	SLPFA	SLPP	SLPFA	
Janaka Thissakuttiarachchi	BAD	50,151	20 August 2020		SLPP	SLPFA	SLPP	SLPFA	
Ajith Rajapakse	HAM	47,375	20 August 2020		SLPP	SLPFA	SLPP	SLPFA	Deputy Speaker & Chairman of Committees (22–24).
Rajitha Senaratne	KAL	77,476	20 August 2020		DNM	SJB	DNM	SJB	
Seetha Arambepola	NAT		20 August 2020		SLPP	SLPFA	SLPP	SLPFA	
Chandima Weerakkody	GAL	84,984	20 August 2020		SLPP	SLPFA	Ind	SJB	
John Senewiratne	RAT	61,612	20 August 2020		SLPP	SLPFA	Ind	SJB	
Upul Mahendra	GAM	67,756	20 August 2020		SLPP	SLPFA	SLPP	SLPFA	
D. Siddarthan	JAF	23,740	20 August 2020		PLOTE	TNA	PLOTE	DTNA	
Mohan Silva	GAL	111,626	20 August 2020		SLPP	SLPFA	SLPP	SLPFA	
G. Karunakaran	BAT	26,382	20 August 2020		TELO	TNA	TELO	DTNA	
M. Rameshwaran	NUW	57,167	20 August 2020		CWC	SLPFA	CWC	SLPFA	
T. Kalaiarasan	NAT		20 August 2020		ITAK	TNA	ITAK	TNA	
Ranjith Siyambalapitiya	KEG	103,300	20 August 2020		SLFP	SLPFA	SLFP		Deputy Speaker & Chairman of Committees (20–22).
Shan Wijayalal De Silva	GAL	67,793	20 August 2020		SLFP	SLPFA	SJB	SJB	
S. Sritharan	JAF	35,884	20 August 2020		ITAK	TNA	ITAK	TNA	
M. A. Sumanthiran	JAF	27,734	20 August 2020		ITAK	TNA	ITAK	TNA	
Sahan Pradeep Withana	GAM	97,494	20 August 2020		SLPP	SLPFA	SLPP	SLPFA	
Vadivel Suresh	BAD	49,762	20 August 2020		SJB	SJB	SJB	SJB	
Maithripala Sirisena	POL	111,137	20 August 2020		SLFP	SLPFA	SLFP		
Janaka Bandara Tennakoon	MTL	73,296	20 August 2020		SLPP	SLPFA	SLPP	SLPFA	
Athuraliye Rathana Thero	NAT		5 January 2021		OPPP		OPPP	ULS	
M. Udayakumar	NUW	68,119	20 August 2020		NUW	SJB	NUW	SJB	
Jeewan Thondaman	NUW	109,155	20 August 2020		CWC	SLPFA	CWC	SLPFA	
M. S. Thowfeek	TRI	43,759	20 August 2020		SLMC	SJB	SLMC	SJB	
Ranil Wickremesinghe	NAT		23 June 2021	21 July 2022	UNP		UNP		Prime Minister (22). Elected President. Replaced by Wajira Abeywardana.
M. Velu Kumar	KAN	57,445	20 August 2020		DPF	SJB	DPF	SJB	
Thenuka Vidanagamage	BAD	68,338	20 August 2020		SLPP	SLPFA	SLPP	SLPFA	
Tissa Vitharana	NAT		20 August 2020		LSSP	SLPFA	LSSP	ULS	
S. Viyalendiran	BAT	22,218	20 August 2020		SLPP	SLPFA	SLPP	SLPFA	
Janaka Wakkumbura	RAT	101,225	20 August 2020		SLPP	SLPFA	SLPP	SLPFA	
Pavithra Devi Wanniarachchi	RAT	200,977	20 August 2020		SLPP	SLPFA	SLPP	SLPFA	
Dilip Wedaarachchi	HAM	25,376	20 August 2020		SJB	SJB	SJB	SJB	
D. Weerasingha	AMP	56,006	20 August 2020		SLPP	SLPFA	SLPP	SLPFA	
Wimal Weerawansa	COL	267,084	20 August 2020		NFF	SLPFA	NFF	ULS	
Kumara Welgama	KAL	77,083	20 August 2020		NLFP	SJB	NLFP	SJB	
Eran Wickramaratne	NAT		20 August 2020		SJB	SJB	SJB	SJB	
C. V. Vigneswaran	JAF	21,554	20 August 2020		TPA	TPNA	TPA	TPNA	
Vidura Wickremenayake	KAL	147,958	20 August 2020		SLPP	SLPFA	SLPP	SLPFA	
Jayantha Weerasinghe	NAT		20 August 2020		SLPP	SLPFA	SLPP	SLPFA	
Sarath Weerasekara	COL	328,092	20 August 2020		SLPP	SLPFA	SLPP	SLPFA	
Madhura Withanage	COL	70,205	20 August 2020		SLPP	SLPFA	SLPP	SLPFA	
Priyantha Liyanage	RAT	41,766	20 August 2020		SJB	SJB	SJB	SJB	
Gamini Waleboda	RAT	85,840	20 August 2020		NFF	SLPFA	NFF	ULS	
Kanchana Wijesekera	MTR	96,033	20 August 2020		SLPP	SLPFA	SLPP	SLPFA	
Chaminda Wijesiri	BAD	36,291	20 August 2020	9 January 2024	SJB	SJB	SJB	SJB	Replaced by Nayana Wasalathilake.
Manjula Dissanayake	NAT		20 August 2020		SLPP	SLPFA	SLPP	SLPFA	
Ranjith Bandara	NAT		20 August 2020		SLPP	SLPFA	SLPP	SLPFA	
Gevindu Kumaratunga	NAT		20 August 2020		SLPP	SLPFA	SLPP	SLPFA	
Ankumbura Withanage	RAT	60,426	20 August 2020		SJB	SJB	SJB	SJB	
Anura Priyadharshana Yapa	KUR	59,696	20 August 2020		SLPP	SLPFA	Ind	SJB	
Rahul Rajapuththiran	BAT	33,332	20 August 2020		ITAK	TNA	ITAK	TNA	
Lalith Varna Kumara	KAL		30 November 2021		SLPP	SLPFA	SLPP	SLPFA	Replaces Mahinda Samarasinghe.
Jagath Samarawickrama	POL		19 May 2022		SLPP	SLPFA	SLPP	SLPFA	Replaces Amarakeerthi Athukorala.
A. H. M. Fowzie	COL		19 January 2023		SJB	SJB	SJB	SJB	Replaces Mujibur Rahman.
Seyed Ali Zahir Moulana	BAT		11 October 2023		SLMC		SLMC		Replaces Ahamed Nazeer Zainulabdeen.
Nayana Wasalathilake	BAD		12 January 2024		SJB	SJB	SJB	SJB	Replaces Chaminda Wijesiri.
Jagath Priyankara	PUT		8 February 2024		NFF	SLPFA	NFF	ULS	Replaces Sanath Nishantha.
Sarath Chandrasiri Muthukumarana	ANU		5 March 2024		SLPP	SLPFA	SLPP	SLPFA	Replaces Uddika Premarathna.
M. G. Weerasena	ANU		24 April 2024		SLPP	SLPFA	SLPP	SLPFA	Replaces K. H. Nandasena.
Mujibur Rahman	NAT		10 May 2024		SJB	SJB	SJB	SJB	Replaces Diana Gamage.
Kathiravelu Sanmugam Kuhadasan	TRI		9 July 2024		ITAK	TNA	ITAK	TNA	Replaces R. Sampanthan.
Bandula Lal Bandarigoda	GAL		21 August 2024		SJB	SJB	SJB	SJB	Replaces Manusha Nanayakkara.
Karu Paranawithana	RAT		3 September 2024		SJB	SJB	SJB	SJB	Replaces Thalatha Atukorale.
Lakshman Nipuna Arachchi	COL		23 September 2024		JVP	NPP	JVP	NPP	Replaces Anura Kumara Dissanayake.
