= Freedom People's Alliance =

Political alliance in Sri Lanka

Freedom People's Alliance නිදහස් ජනතා සන්ධානය சுதந்திர மக்கள் கூட்டணி
- Abbreviation: FPA
- Leader: Collective leadership
- Secretary: Thilanga Sumathipala
- Founded: 11 January 2023
- Preceded by: Sri Lanka People's Freedom Alliance
- Political position: Big tent Factions: Centre-left to far-left
- Colors: Orange; Yellow
- Parliament of Sri Lanka: 0 / 225

Election symbol
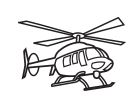
- Helicopter

The Freedom People's Alliance (abbreviated FPA; Sinhala: නිදහස් ජනතා සන්ධානය Nidahas Janathā Sandānaya; Tamil: சுதந்திர மக்கள் கூட்டணி Cutantira Makkaḷ Kūṭṭaṇi) was a political alliance in Sri Lanka founded in 2023. The alliance consisted of 12 political parties, including the Sri Lanka Freedom Party (SFLP), the Uttara Lanka Sabhagaya and the Freedom People's Congress.

According to ULS chairman Wimal Weerawansa, the alliance does not have a single leader; instead, it has a leadership board.

== Background ==
On 31 October 2019, seventeen parties including the Sri Lanka Podujana Peramuna (SLPP) and the SLFP signed an agreement at the Sri Lanka Foundation Institute in Colombo to form the Sri Lanka People's Freedom Alliance (SLPFA), a political alliance led by former President Mahinda Rajapaksa. The alliance supported the SLPP candidate, Mahinda Rajapaksa's brother Gotabaya Rajapaksa in the 2019 presidential election. Gotabaya won the election and became President of Sri Lanka, installing Mahinda as Prime Minister. The alliance went on to contest the 2020 Sri Lankan parliamentary elections, winning a landslide victory with 145 seats.

However, between 2021 and 2022 the Rajapaksa government lost much of its popularity. The ongoing economic crisis continued to deteriorate due to mismanagement by the government. By 2021, Sri Lanka's debt-to-GDP ratio had risen to 119%. The government had also become highly nepotistic, with another Rajapaksa brother, Basil, serving as Minister of Finance and several more members of the Rajapaksa family holding prominent positions in the government.

On 5 April 2022, amidst street protests against the Rajapaksa government and a brewing political crisis, the SLPP began losing many of its key allies in the SLPFA, including the SLFP. SLFP leader and former President Maithripala Sirisena pledged that his party would become politically neutral and would contest future elections separately from the SLPP.

== History ==
On 11 January 2023, the Freedom People's Alliance was ceremoniously launched at the headquarters of the Sri Lanka Freedom Party. At the event, Freedom People's Congress leader Dullas Alahapperuma stated that the group's main objective was to fight political corruption in Sri Lanka and safeguard the rule of law, while conceding that the previous support of FPA constituent parties for the Rajapaksa government had been a "mistake".

The alliance was launched to contest in the 2023 Sri Lankan local elections, which would ultimately be postponed.

== Composition ==
At its formation, the alliance consisted of the following parties:

Party	Leader	Ideology	Political position	MPs (Note: At the time of the dissolution of the 16th Parliament of Sri Lanka on 24 September 2024)
Freedom People's Congress	Dullas Alahapperuma	Fiscal conservatism; Anti-corruption; Anti-nepotism		13 / 225
Sri Lanka Freedom Party	Maithripala Sirisena	Social democracy Sinhalese nationalism Left-wing nationalism	Centre-left	12 / 225
Supreme Lanka Coalition: Communist Party of Sri Lanka; Democratic Left Front; Lanka Sama Samaja Party; Our Power of People's Party; Piwithuru Hela Urumaya; National Freedom Front; Yuthukama National Organization	Wimal Weerawansa	Sinhalese nationalism Left-wing nationalism	Left-wing to far-left	11 / 225
Freedom People's Front	Nalaka Godahewa	Anti-corruption; Anti-nepotism		1 / 225
