= Kumarasiri =

Kumarasiri is a given name and surname. Notable people with the name include:

- Kumarasiri Rathnayake (born 1967), Sri Lankan teacher and politician
- Ananda Kumarasiri (born 1954), Sri Lankan politician
- K. P. S. Kumarasiri (fl. 2012), Sri Lankan politician
- P. Kumarasiri (1919-2004), Sri Lankan politician
- P. D. J. Kumarasiri (fl. 1979), Sri Lankan engineer
