= Sanath Nishantha =

Sri Lankan politician (1975–2024)

Hon. Sanath Nishantha
- සනත් නිශාන්ත சனத் நிசாந்த

Minister of State for Water Supply (Note: Minister of State for Rural and Divisional Drinking Water Supply Projects Development from 12 August 2020 to 3 April 2022.)
- In office 8 September 2022 – 25 January 2024
- President: Ranil Wickremesinghe
- Prime Minister: Dinesh Gunawardena
- Succeeded by: Shasheendra Rajapaksa (Note: As Minister of State for Irrigation and Water Resources Management)
- In office 12 August 2020 – 9 May 2022
- President: Gotabaya Rajapaksa
- Prime Minister: Mahinda Rajapaksa
- Preceded by: Vasudeva Nanayakkara

Minister of State for Fisheries and Inland Fisheries Industry
- In office 27 November 2019 – 12 August 2020
- President: Gotabaya Rajapaksa
- Prime Minister: Mahinda Rajapaksa
- Preceded by: Dilip Wedaarachchi (Note: As Minister of State for Fisheries and Aquatic Resources Development)
- Succeeded by: Kanchana Wijesekera (Note: As Minister of State for Ornamental Fish, Inland Fish and Prawn Farming, Fishery Harbour Development, Multiday Fishing Activities and Fish Exports)

North Western Provincial Minister of Fisheries, Highways and Power
- In office 31 May 2010 – 1 September 2015
- Governor: Tissa Balalle; Amara Piyaseeli Ratnayake
- Chief Minister: Athula Wijesinghe; Dayasiri Jayasekara

Member of Parliament for Puttalam District
- In office 1 September 2015 – 25 January 2024
- Succeeded by: Jagath Priyankara

Member of the North Western Provincial Council
- In office 25 April 2004 – 1 September 2015
- Governor: Dharmadasa Wanniarachchi; Tissa Balalle; Amara Piyaseeli Ratnayake
- Chief Minister: Athula Wijesinghe; Dayasiri Jayasekara
- Constituency: Puttalam District

Personal details
- Born: Sanath Nishantha Perera; 3 May 1975 Chilaw, Sri Lanka
- Died: 25 January 2024 (aged 48) Ragama, Sri Lanka
- Cause of death: Car accident
- Party: Sri Lanka Podujana Peramuna
- Other political affiliations: SLPFA (2019–2024); UPFA (2004–2019); People's Alliance (1994–2004)
- Spouse: Chamari Perera
- Children: 4
- Education: St. Mary's College, Chilaw
- Occupation: Politician

Sanath Nishantha Perera (Sinhala: සනත් නිශාන්ත, Tamil: சனத் நிசாந்த; 3 May 1975 – 25 January 2024), more commonly known as Sanath Nishantha, was a Sri Lankan politician who was a member of parliament and a Minister of State. He was elected from the Puttalam District in 2015 and 2020, and served until his death in 2024. He was a member of the United People's Freedom Alliance and later the Sri Lanka Podujana Peramuna. He served as the Minister of State for Water Supply from 8 September 2022 until his death as well as the Minister of State for the Fisheries during the presidency of Gotabaya Rajapaksa.

== Early life and education ==
Sanath Nishantha Perera was born on 3 May 1975 in Chilaw in the North Western Province. He was the last of five siblings, with one sister and three brothers. He received his primary education at St. Mary's Boys College in Chilaw.

== Political career ==
Nishantha first got involved in politics by running for the Arachchikattuwa Divisional Council during the 1997 local elections under the banner of the Sri Lanka Freedom Party, failing to get elected. However, following the assassination of Chairman-elect Saman Premachandra, Nishantha was elected to the council.

In 2004, Nishantha participated in the provincial council elections for the North Western Province and was elected. Subsequently, he would run again in 2009 and 2013, successfully being reelected in both instances and securing the highest number of preferential votes in 2013, which amounted to 62,996 votes in the Puttalam District. Throughout his tenure in the provincial council, Nishantha assumed significant roles, including his appointment as the Minister of Fisheries, Highways, and Power for the province on 31 May 2010 by Chief Minister Athula Wijesinghe.

Nishantha ran for parliament for the first time in 2015, being elected with 80,082 preferential votes. During the presidency of Gotabaya Rajapaksa he served in various positions, first as the Minister of State for the Fisheries and later as the Minister of State for Water Supply. Following the mass resignation of the Sri Lankan cabinet in the wake of the 2022 Sri Lankan protests, Nishantha was removed from his ministerial posts. However following the election of Ranil Wickremesinghe as president, he was reappointed as the Minister of State for Water Supply, serving from 8 September 2022 until his death.

== Controversies and legal issues ==
=== Arrests for assault ===
Sanath Nishantha was arrested several times for assault. In 2008, he and his brother Jagath Samantha assaulted and obstructed the duties of the then Arachchikattuwa Divisional Secretary. In 2015, during the presidential election, he and his supporters attacked an office of opposition candidate Maithripala Sirisena and assaulted his supporters.

=== Illegal environmental destruction ===
In 2020, a video was posted to social media in which Nishantha was seen attempting to force forest conservationists and locals to allow mangroves in Negombo to be destroyed to build a volleyball court. When a state official questioned the impact the destruction would have on the valuable coastal mangrove ecosystem and pointed out how such continued deforestation throughout the country would lead to future generations not having any oxygen to breathe, one of Nishantha's supporters claimed that the local children "[did] not need oxygen". Environment and Wildlife Resources Minister S. M. Chandrasena said Nishantha was ignorant of the Wildlife Protection Act, but even after the incident, Nishantha claimed he would not stop despite the opposition.

In August 2020, at least 0.40 ha (1 acre) of Ramsar wetland in Anawilundawa, Puttalam was illegally cleared for shrimp farming. This caused great outrage and a committee was appointed to investigate the destruction. The police investigation revealed that Jagath Samantha, brother of Sanath Nishantha, directed the destruction.

=== Role during the Sri Lankan political crisis ===
In early 2022, protests erupted in Sri Lanka against the government, which Nishantha represented, in response to a severe economic crisis marked by rampant inflation, frequent blackouts, and shortages of fuel, domestic gas, and other essential goods. Nishantha adopted a critical stance towards the protests, downplaying the economic challenges experienced by the nation and its citizens. Furthermore, he labeled the protesters as 'drug addicts,' suggesting that they deserved to face the same anti-government suppression tactics witnessed during the 1971 and 1987-1989 insurrections led by the Janatha Vimukthi Peramuna. On 9 May, he was implicated in incidents involving attacks on peaceful anti-government protesters at the 'Gotagogama' site at Galle Face Green, leading to his arrest. On August 23, Nishantha conducted a press conference at the Sri Lanka Podujana Peramuna party headquarters. During the conference, he alleged that several magistrates in the country were providing preferential treatment to activists who had taken part in the protests, including granting them bail. Subsequently, three petitions were filed against Nishantha by civil organizations, alleging contempt of court. These organizations argued that his remarks during the press conference and his purported attacks on protesters had adversely impacted the "honour and the image of the judiciary". The Court of Appeal issued a warrant to arrest Sanath Nishantha on 22 October 2022 after he failed to appear to court over the charges on 29 September and 5 October.

== Personal life ==
Nishantha married Chamari Perera and they had four children: three daughters and a son. Nishantha was a devout Roman Catholic.

=== Death ===
In the early hours of 25 January 2024, Nishantha was involved in a traffic collision on the Katunayake Highway after his car collided with the roadside barrier and a moving container truck. He was returning to Colombo after attending a wedding held in the Bandarawatta area of Chilaw. Nishantha, who was asleep at the time of the incident, suffered servere injuries to his head and right leg, leading to his admission to the Colombo North Teaching Hospital in Ragama, where he died. A member of his security detail also died in the incident and his driver was hospitalised with serious injuries. The driver later confessed to the police that the car was travelling at a speed of nearly 160 km/h (99 mph) at the time of the accident, causing him to lose control of the vehicle.

Nishantha's funeral took place on 28 January 2024, at the Rajakadaluwa Catholic Cemetery in Arachchikattuwa, Puttalam.

== See also ==
- List of members of the Sri Lankan Parliament who died in office
