= Ministry of Urban Development and Housing =

Government ministry of Sri Lanka

Ministry of Urban Development, Construction and Housing
- නාගරික සංවර්ධන, ඉදිකිරීම් හා නිවාස අමාත්‍යාංශය நகர அபிவிருத்தி, நிர்மாணிப்பு மற்றும் வீடமைப்பு அமைச்சு

Ministry overview
- Jurisdiction: Government of Sri Lanka
- Headquarters: Floor 2nd,12th & 13th Floors, Sethsiripaya, Battaramulla; 6.903351°N 79.915638°E
- Minister responsible: Mr.Anura Karunathilake, Minister of Urban Development, Construction and Housing
- Ministry executive: Mr. Ranjith Ariyaratne, Secretary of the Ministry
- Child agencies: National Physical Planning Department; Department of Buildings; Department of Government Factories; Department of National Community Water Supply; Urban Development Authority; National Housing Development Authority; Construction Industry Development Authority; Urban Settlement Development Authority; Condominium Management Authority (Common Amenities Board); Sri Lanka Land Development Corporation; Building Material Corporation Limited; State Engineering Corporation of Sri Lanka
- Website: www.moudh.gov.lk

The Ministry of Urban Development, Construction and Housing (Sinhala: නාගරික සංවර්ධන හා නිවාස අමාත්‍යාංශය; Tamil: நகர அபிவிருத்தி மற்றும் வீடமைப்பு அமைச்சு) is a cabinet ministry of the Government of Sri Lanka responsible for housing and construction. The ministry is responsible for formulating and implementing national policy on housing and construction and other subjects which come under its purview. The current Minister of Urban Development and Housing is Mr. Ranjith Ariyarathne The ministry's secretary is Mr. Ranjith Ariyaratne.

== Ministers ==
Ministers of Housing
Name	Portrait	Party	Took office	Left office	Head of government	Ministerial title	Refs
Kanthiah Vaithianathan			1953	1953	John Kotelawala	Minister of Housing and Social Services	
Kanthiah Vaithianathan			1953	1956	John Kotelawala	Minister of Industries, Housing and Social Services	
T. B. Ilangaratne		Sri Lanka Freedom Party	12 April 1956	1959	S. W. R. D. Bandaranaike	Minister of Labour, Housing and Social Services	
Vimala Wijewardene		Sri Lanka Freedom Party	9 June 1959		S. W. R. D. Bandaranaike	Minister of Local Government and Housing	
Vimala Wijewardene		Sri Lanka Freedom Party		21 November 1959	W. Dahanayake	Minister of Local Government and Housing	
M. B. W. Mediwake		Sri Lanka Freedom Party			W. Dahanayake	Minister of Local Government and Housing	
J. R. Jayewardene		United National Party	23 March 1960	1960	Dudley Senanayake	Minister of Local Government and Housing	
Mahanama Samaraweera		Sri Lanka Freedom Party	23 July 1960		Sirimavo Bandaranaike	Minister of Local Government and Housing	
Badi-ud-din Mahmud			28 May 1963		Sirimavo Bandaranaike	Minister of Health and Housing	
M. H. Mohamed		United National Party	March 1965		Dudley Senanayake	Minister of Labour, Employment and Housing	
Pieter Keuneman		Communist Party	31 May 1970	February 1977	Sirimavo Bandaranaike	Minister of Housing and Construction	
Ranasinghe Premadasa		United National Party	23 July 1977		J. R. Jayewardene	Minister of Local Government, Housing and Construction	
Sirisena Cooray		United National Party	18 February 1989		Ranasinghe Premadasa	Minister of Housing and Construction	
Nimal Siripala de Silva		Sri Lanka Freedom Party	19 August 1994		D. B. Wijetunga	Minister of Housing, Construction and Public Utilities	
Mangala Samaraweera		Sri Lanka Freedom Party	4 September 2001		Chandrika Kumaratunga	Minister of Urban Development, Public Utilities, Housing and Sports	
Arumugam Thondaman		Ceylon Workers' Congress	12 December 2001		Chandrika Kumaratunga	Minister of Housing and Plantation Infrastructure	
Ferial Ashraff		National Unity Alliance	10 April 2004		Chandrika Kumaratunga	Minister of Housing and Construction Industry, Eastern Province Education and Irrigation Development	
Ferial Ashraff		National Unity Alliance	23 November 2005		Mahinda Rajapaksa	Minister of Housing and Construction	
Ferial Ashraff		National Unity Alliance	28 January 2007		Mahinda Rajapaksa	Minister of Housing and Common Amenities	
Wimal Weerawansa		National Freedom Front	23 April 2010		Mahinda Rajapaksa	Minister of Construction, Engineering Services, Housing and Common Amenities	
Sajith Premadasa		United National Party	12 January 2015	17 August 2015	Maithripala Sirisena	Minister of Housing and Samurdhi	
Sajith Premadasa		United National Party	4 September 2015		Maithripala Sirisena	Minister of Housing and Construction	

== Secretaries ==
Housing Secretaries
Name	Took office	Left office	Title	Refs
Nissanka N. Wijeratne	25 April 2010		Construction, Engineering Services, Housing and Common Amenities Secretary	
S. M. G. Jayaratne	22 November 2010		Construction, Engineering Services, Housing and Common Amenities Secretary	
P. H. L. W. Perera	12 July 2012		Construction, Engineering Services, Housing and Common Amenities Secretary	
W. K. K. Athukorala	8 September 2015		Housing and Construction Secretary	
