= Upul =

Upul (Sinhala: උපුල්) is a Sri Lankan male given name. Notable people with this name include:

- Upul Chandana, Sri Lankan cricket player
- Upul Fernando (born 1973), Sri Lankan cricket player
- Upul Galappaththi (born 1979), Sri Lankan physician and politician
- Upul Indrasiri (born 1982), Sri Lankan cricket player
- Upul Mahendra (born 1971), Sri Lankan politician
- Upul Sumathipala (born 1959), Sri Lankan cricket player
- Upul Tharanga, Sri Lankan cricket player
