= Gamini Waleboda =

Sri Lankan politician

Hon. Gamini Waleboda
- ගාමිණි වලේබොඩ காமினி வலேபோடா

Member of the Parliament of Sri Lanka
- Incumbent
- Assumed office 2020
- Constituency: Ratnapura District

Personal details
- Born: 28 October 1967 (age 58)
- Party: National Freedom Front
- Other political affiliations: Supreme Lanka Coalition (since 2022); Sri Lanka People's Freedom Alliance (2019–2022)
- Education: University of Colombo

Gamini Waleboda (born 28 October 1967) is a Sri Lankan politician and Member of Parliament.

Waleboda was born on 28 October 1967. He has bachelor and postgraduate degrees from the University of Colombo. He served on the Board of Investment of Sri Lanka and worked for the Inland Revenue Department where he was deputy commissioner. He has been an external lecturer at several universities. He is a member of the National Freedom Front.

Waleboda contested the 2020 parliamentary election as a Sri Lanka People's Freedom Alliance electoral alliance candidate in Ratnapura District and was elected to the Parliament of Sri Lanka.

Electoral history of Gamini Waleboda
Election	Constituency	Party	Alliance	Votes	Result
2020 parliamentary	Ratnapura District	National Freedom Front	Sri Lanka People's Freedom Alliance	85,840	Elected
