= Jagath Priyankara =

Sri Lankan politician

Hon. Jagath Priyankara
- ජගත් ප්‍රියංකර ஜகத் பிரியங்கர

Member of Parliament for Puttalam District
- In office 8 February 2024 – 24 September 2024
- Preceded by: Sanath Nishantha

Personal details
- Born: L.K. Jagath Priyankara; 9 December 1979 (age 46) Sri Lanka
- Party: National Freedom Front
- Other political affiliations: Sri Lanka People's Freedom Alliance (2019–2022); United People's Freedom Alliance (2004–2019)
- Occupation: Politician

L.K. Jagath Priyankara (Sinhala: ජගත් ප්‍රියංකර; Tamil: ஜகத் பிரியங்கர; born 1979), more commonly known as Jagath Priyankara, is a Sri Lankan politician. Who served as a member of the Parliament of Sri Lanka from the Puttalam District following the death of Sanath Nishantha.
