= Jagath Samarawickrama =

Sri Lankan politician

Hon. S. Jagath Samarawickrama MP
- ජගත් සමරවික්‍රම

Member of the Parliament of Sri Lanka
- Incumbent
- Assumed office 19 May 2022
- Preceded by: Amarakeerthi Athukorala
- Constituency: Polonnaruwa District

Member of the Dimbulagala Pradeshiya Sabha
- In office 2008–2015
- Constituency: Polonnaruwa District

Personal details
- Born: S. Jagath Samarawickrama Siripura, Polonnaruwa
- Party: Sri Lanka People's Front
- Profession: Politician

S. Jagath Samarawickrama, is a Sri Lankan politician and Member of Parliament.

He attended Kaudawa National School, Moneragala and Siripura Central College. He entered politics in 2007 where he later served as the Chairman of the Dimbulagala Pradeshiya Sabha from 2008 to 2015. Currently, he is working as the Chief Organizer of the Dimbulagala Welikanda Degodapattuwa Sri Lanka People’s Front.

Samarawickrama contested the 2020 parliamentary election as a Sri Lanka Podujana Peramuna (SLPP) candidate in Polonnaruwa District but he was unsuccessful in his bid to elected to the Parliament of Sri Lanka, finishing as the fifth among the SLPP candidates. However on 17 May 2022, he was appointed as a member of the parliament after the death of a fellow MP from Polonnaruwa, Amarakeerthi Athukorala during the violent clashes occur in Nittambuwa. He sworn in as an MP on 19 May 2022, in front of the speaker Mahinda Yapa Abeywardena.
