= Wimal Weerawansa =

Sri Lankan politician

Hon. Wimal Weerawansa
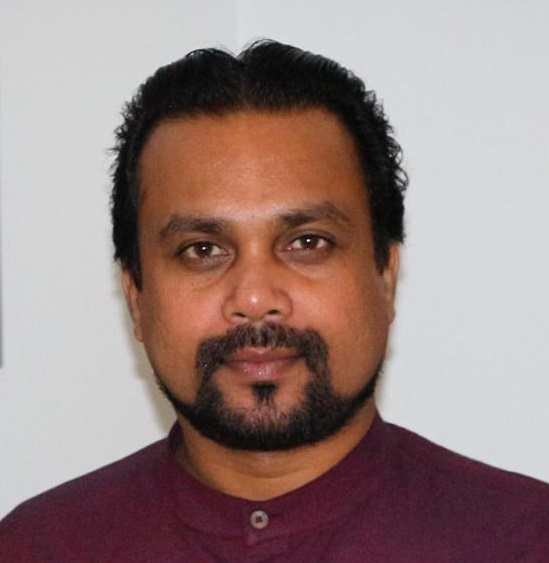

Leader of the National Freedom Front
- Incumbent
- Assumed office 14 May 2008
- Preceded by: Position established

Minister of Industries (Note: Minister of Industries and Supply chain Management from 22 November 2019 to 12 August 2020.)
- In office 22 November 2019 – 3 March 2022
- President: Gotabaya Rajapaksa
- Prime Minister: Mahinda Rajapaksa
- Preceded by: Daya Gamage
- Succeeded by: Dilum Amunugama

Minister of Small & Medium Business and Enterprise Development
- In office 22 November 2019 – 12 August 2020
- President: Gotabaya Rajapaksa
- Prime Minister: Mahinda Rajapaksa
- Preceded by: Ravi Karunanayake

Minister of Housing and Social Welfare
- In office 9 November 2018 – 15 December 2018
- President: Maithripala Sirisena
- Prime Minister: Mahinda Rajapaksa
- Preceded by: Sajith Premadasa
- Succeeded by: Sajith Premadasa

Minister of Construction, Engineering Services, Housing and Common Amenities
- In office 23 April 2010 – 12 January 2015
- President: Mahinda Rajapaksa
- Prime Minister: D. M. Jayaratne
- Preceded by: Ferial Ashraff
- Succeeded by: Sajith Premadasa

Member of Parliament for Colombo District
- In office 2000–2024

Member of the Western Provincial Council
- In office 1999–2000

Member of Colombo Municipal Council
- In office 1997–1999

Personal details
- Born: Weerasangilige Wimal Weerawansha; 7 March 1970 (age 56)
- Citizenship: Sri Lankan
- Party: National Freedom Front (since 2008); Janatha Vimukthi Peramuna (1987–2008)
- Other political affiliations: Supreme Lanka Coalition (2022–2024); Sri Lanka People's Freedom Alliance (2019–2022); United People's Freedom Alliance (2004–2019)
- Spouse: Shashi Weerawansha
- Children: 2
- Occupation: Politician
- Website: wimalweerawansa.lk

Weerasangilige Wimal Weerawansa (Sinhala: විමල් වීරවංශ, Tamil: விமல் வீரவன்ச) (born 7 March 1970) is a Sri Lankan politician, former member of parliament and current leader of the National Freedom Front (NFF). Weerawansa has served many cabinet positions, including Minister of Industries from 2020 to 2022, Minister of Small and Medium Business and Enterprise Development, Industries and Supply Chain Management from 2019 to 2020, Minister of Housing and Social Welfare in 2018 and the Minister of Construction and Housing from 2010 to 2015.

== Early life and family ==
Weerawanssa was born 7 March 1970. (Note: Weerawansha's date of birth was given as 7 March 1970. However, following the 2015 change in government it was revealed that Weerawansha and his wife had altered details, such as their dates of birth, on several official documents and that Weerawansha's actual date of birth was 7 March 1970.) He is the son of Weerasangilige Podineris, a dancing teacher and professional musician, and Wadachcharige Salie. Weerawansa has one brother (Sarath Weerawansa) and three sisters (Weerasangilige Sumanawathie, Chandani Weerawansa and Nilani Weerawansa). Weerawansa was educated at Tissa Central College in Kalutara where he played for his school's cricket team. Weerawansa passed eight GCE Ordinary levels and started studying GCE A levels but was expelled for poor attendance.

Weerawansa is married to Ranasinghe Mudiyanselage Shirsha Udayanthi (Sashi). They have a son and a daughter.

== Career ==
Weerawansa joined the Janatha Vimukthi Peramuna (JVP) during its second insurrection and wrote articles in Lakdiva and Hiru, pro-JVP periodicals. He was known by various aliases including Wimalasiri Gamlath and Wanshanatha. He was president of the Peoples' Movement for Freedom (Nidahasa Udesa Janatha Viyaparaya), propaganda secretary and politburo member of the JVP. In his early political years, Weerawansa was greatly influenced by socialism and disliked nationalism as much as capitalism. He even accused the ultra-nationalist National Movement Against Terrorism (NMAT) of orchestrating a coup d'état. However, as time went by, Weerawansa and the JVP slowly began to move away from Marxism and towards Sinhalese nationalism.

Weerawansa was one of the Sri Lanka Progressive Front (a JVP-led front) candidates in the Colombo District at the 1994 parliamentary election, but the SLPF failed to win any seats in the district. He contested the 1997 local government election as a JVP candidate and was elected to the Colombo Municipal Council. He contested the 1999 provincial council election as one of the JVP's candidates in the Colombo District, and as the JVP's chief ministerial candidate, but failed to get elected. The JVP nevertheless appointed Weerawansa to the Western Provincial Council. Weerawansa contested the 2000 parliamentary election as one of the JVP's candidates in Colombo District. He was elected and entered Parliament. He was re-elected in 2001.

Weerawansa played a key role in the JVP's opposition to president Chandrika Kumaratunga's devolution plans and Norwegian-facilitated peace talks with the militant Liberation Tigers of Tamil Eelam. On 20 January 2004, the Sri Lanka Freedom Party (SLFP) and the JVP got together to form the United People's Freedom Alliance (UPFA). Weerawansa was one of the UPFA's candidates in the Colombo District at the 2004 parliamentary election and was re-elected. In June 2005, the JVP left the UPFA government. Weerawansa was general-secretary of the Patriotic National Movement (PNM).

Weerawansa fell out with the leadership of JVP and was suspended from the party in March 2008, on accusations of corruption, espionage and extra-marital affairs. This decision was taken by the executive committee of the JVP and was approved by a majority vote. In May 2008, several dissident JVP MPs led by Weerawansa formed the National Freedom Front (NFF) (or the Jathika Nidahas Peramuna). The NFF rejoined the UPFA government in December 2008. Weerawansa was re-elected at the 2010 parliamentary election, and was appointed Minister of Construction, Engineering Services, Housing and Common Amenities after the election. He lost his ministerial position following the 2015 presidential election. He was re-elected at the 2015 parliamentary election. Weerawansa was appointed as the Minister of Small & Medium Business and Enterprise Development, Industries and Supply chain Management in November 2019 following the 2019 presidential election.

Weerawansa was appointed as Minister of Industries in 2020 under Gotabaya Rajapaksa, but was later stripped of his ministerial portfolios on 3 March 2022.

On 4 September 2022, after defecting from the ruling Sri Lanka People's Freedom Alliance, Weerawansa founded the Supreme Lanka Coalition along with seven other small leftist and nationalist parties. In January 2023, the SLC formed the Freedom People's Alliance with the SLFP and the Freedom People's Congress.

In October 2024, Wimal Weerawansa announced that the NFF would not be participating in the upcoming parliamentary elections, in hopes of increasing chances of the JVP-led National People's Power, led by president Anura Kumara Dissanayake, winning a majority in Parliament.

== Controversies ==
Weerawansa has been involved in numerous controversies during his career. In 2006 he was accused of sexually harassing a 24-year-old female employee of the state-owned Lake House. On 8 July 2010 Weerawansa began a hunger strike outside the United Nations office in Colombo to protest against the appointment of the Panel of Experts on Accountability in Sri Lanka by the Secretary-General of the United Nations Ban Ki-moon. Despite claiming to go on a "fast-unto-death", Weerawansa's hunger strike only lasted until 10 July 2010 and was seen as a publicity stunt. In March 2012, Weerawansa called for Sri Lankans to boycott American products such as Coca-Cola, Pepsi, KFC, McDonald's, Google and Gmail as a protest against the US government sponsoring a resolution on Sri Lanka at the United Nations Human Rights Council.

Following the change in government in January 2015, the police started investigating Weerawansa's wife Shashi over allegations that she faked official documents to obtain a diplomatic passport. A panel investigating the activities of the housing ministry during Weerawansa's ministry uncovered financial irregularities and rampant nepotism. Weerawansa was investigated by the Financial Crimes Investigation Division (FCID) over how several of his relatives obtained government constructed houses at well below market prices. Weerawansa was arrested at Bandaranaike International Airport on 23 October 2015 due to discrepancies in his passport. After being questioned by the Criminal Investigation Department, he was produced before Negombo Magistrate's Court and released on bail. Weerawana was arrested by the Police Financial Crimes Financial Crimes Investigations Division (FCID) on accusations of misusing government vehicles on 10 January 2017. Weerawansa's bail applications were rejected several times. While he was in custody, Weerawansa started a hunger strike claiming of political revenge by the government. The hunger strike was called off after eight days on requests made by Theras of the Malwathu and Asgiri chapters and fellow politicians. Weerawansa was released on bail on 7 April 2017.

Weerawansa has been accused of spreading communalism.

Weerawansa asked the public to launch a Black Flag protest to oppose Indian prime minister Narendra Modi during his visit to Sri Lanka in May 2017.

In October 2017, Weerawansa stated that the parliament should be bombed if a new constitution was approved by a parliament vote. The Parliament Speaker urged to inquire into Weerawansa's statement. Piyasiri Wijenayake, an NFF member criticized Weerawansa and claimed that the thoughts expressed were Weerawansa's personal views.

In May 2022, Weerawansa's wife, Shashi was sentenced to two years in prison after she was found guilty of obtaining passport by submitting false information. The court also imposed a fine of LKR 100,000 on her. This case involved fraudulently obtaining two passports, including a diplomatic one, by presenting false information. She was accused of having different names and birthdates on the documents used to acquire these passports.

== Electoral history ==
Electoral history of Wimal Weerawansa
Election	Constituency	Party	Alliance	Votes	Result
1994 parliamentary	Colombo District	JVP	SLPF	302	Not elected
1997 local	Colombo MC	JVP			Elected
1999 provincial	Colombo District	JVP			Not elected
2000 parliamentary	Colombo District	JVP		13,284	Elected
2001 parliamentary	Colombo District	JVP		19,687	Elected
2004 parliamentary	Colombo District	JVP	UPFA	237,185	Elected
2010 parliamentary	Colombo District	JNP	UPFA	280,672	Elected
2015 parliamentary	Colombo District	JNP	UPFA	313,801	Elected
2020 parliamentary	Colombo District	JNP	SLPFA	267,084	Elected
