= Isuru Dodangoda =

Sri Lankan politician

Hon. Isuru Dodangoda MP
- ඉසුරු දොඩන්ගොඩ இசுரு தொடன்கொட

Member of the Parliament of Sri Lanka
- Incumbent
- Assumed office 2020
- Constituency: Galle District

Member of the Southern Provincial Council
- In office 2014–2019
- Constituency: Galle District

Personal details
- Party: Sri Lanka Podujana Peramuna
- Other political affiliations: Sri Lanka People's Freedom Alliance
- Education: University of Greenwich; Cardiff Metropolitan University

Isuru Udyoga Dodangoda is a Sri Lankan politician, former provincial councillor and Member of Parliament.

Dodangoda is the son of Amarasiri Dodangoda, former government minister and Chief Minister of the Southern Province. He was educated at Ananda College. He has an IT degree from the University of Greenwich and MBA degree from Cardiff Metropolitan University.

Dodangoda was a member of the Southern Provincial Council. He contested the 2020 parliamentary election as a Sri Lanka People's Freedom Alliance electoral alliance candidate in Galle District and was elected to the Parliament of Sri Lanka.

Electoral history of Isuru Dodangoda
Election	Constituency	Party	Alliance	Votes	Result
2014 provincial	Galle District		United People's Freedom Alliance	23,920	Elected
2020 parliamentary	Galle District	Sri Lanka Podujana Peramuna	Sri Lanka People's Freedom Alliance	71,266	Elected
