= T. Kalaiarasan =

Sri Lankan politician

Hon. T. Kalaiarasan MP
- த. கலையரசன் තවරාසා කලයියරසන්

Member of the Parliament of Sri Lanka
- Incumbent
- Assumed office 2020
- Constituency: National List

Member of the Eastern Provincial Council
- In office 2012–2017
- Constituency: Ampara District

Personal details
- Born: Thavarasa Kalaiarasan; 16 April 1970 (age 55)
- Party: Illankai Tamil Arasu Kachchi
- Other political affiliations: Tamil National Alliance

Thavarasa Kalaiarasan (Tamil: தவராசா கலையரசன்; born 16 April 1970) is a Sri Lankan Tamil politician, former provincial councillor and Member of Parliament.

Kalaiarasan was born on 16 April 1970. He is a member of the Illankai Tamil Arasu Kachchi. He was chairman of Navithanveli Divisional Council.

Kalaiarasan contested the 2012 provincial council election as one of the Tamil National Alliance (TNA) electoral alliance's candidates in Ampara District and was elected to the Eastern Provincial Council (EPC). He contested the 2015 parliamentary election as one of the TNA's candidates in Ampara District but failed to get elected after coming 2nd amongst the TNA candidates. He contested the 2020 parliamentary election as one of the TNA's candidates in Ampara District but the alliance failed to win any seats in the district. However, following the election he was appointed to the Parliament of Sri Lanka as a National List MP representing the TNA.

Electoral history of T. Kalaiarasan
| Election | Constituency | Party | Alliance | Votes | Result |
|---|---|---|---|---|---|
| 2012 provincial | Ampara District | Illankai Tamil Arasu Kachchi | Tamil National Alliance | 12,122 | Elected |
| 2015 parliamentary | Ampara District | Illankai Tamil Arasu Kachchi | Tamil National Alliance | 14,723 | Not elected |
| 2020 parliamentary | Ampara District | Illankai Tamil Arasu Kachchi | Tamil National Alliance | | Not elected |
