= Diana Gamage =

Sri Lankan politician

- ඩයනා ගමගේ டயனா கமகே

Member of Parliament for National List
- In office 20 August 2020 – 8 May 2024

Personal details
- Born: Diana Samanmali Gamage; 18 December 1965 (age 60)
- Citizenship: Stateless
- Party: Samagi Jana Balawegaya (until 2021); Sri Lanka Podujana Peramuna (since 2021)
- Occupation: Politician

Diana Gamage (born 18 December 1965) is a British-Sri Lankan politician and businesswoman. She is a former Member of Parliament and formerly served as State Minister of Tourism.

== Political career ==
Gamage was appointed to the Parliament of Sri Lanka from the National List of the Samagi Jana Balawegaya following the 2020 Sri Lankan parliamentary election. In 2021, she defected to the Sri Lanka Podujana Peramuna, the then ruling party of Sri Lanka.

Her right to serve in parliament was challenged by a writ petition filed by social activist Oshala Herath. Herath claimed that Gamage had gained British citizenship in 1998 and not gained dual Sri Lankan citizenship, while Gamage claimed that she had renounced her British citizenship in 2014. The Court of Appeal of Sri Lanka set aside Herath's petition in 2023. On 8 May 2024, following an appeal to the Supreme Court of Sri Lanka, the court set aside the judgement of the Court of Appeal and disqualified Gamage from her parliamentary seat on the basis that she did not hold valid Sri Lankan citizenship, since she failed to submit a certificate of citizenship and found that she had returned to Sri Lanka on a British passport. The SJB named Mujibur Rahman as her replacement in parliament.
