= Samanpriya Herath =

Sri Lankan politician

Hon. Samanpriya Herath MP
- සමන්ප්‍රිය හේරත් சமன்பிரியா ஹேரத்

Member of the Parliament of Sri Lanka
- Incumbent
- Assumed office 2020
- Constituency: Kurunegala District

Member of the North Western Provincial Council
- In office 2013–2018
- Constituency: Kurunegala District

Personal details
- Born: H. M. Samanpriya Herath; 3 November 1976 (age 49)
- Party: Sri Lanka Podujana Peramuna
- Other political affiliations: Sri Lanka People's Freedom Alliance

H. M. Samanpriya Herath (born 3 November 1976) is a Sri Lankan politician, former provincial councillor and Member of Parliament.

Herath was born on 3 November 1976. He was a member of Kuliyapitiya Divisional Council and the North Western Provincial Council. He contested the 2020 parliamentary election as a Sri Lanka People's Freedom Alliance electoral alliance candidate in Kurunegala District and was elected to the Parliament of Sri Lanka.

Electoral history of Samanpriya Herath
Election	Constituency	Party	Alliance	Votes	Result
2009 provincial	Kurunegala District		United People's Freedom Alliance	19,232	Not elected
2013 provincial	Kurunegala District		United People's Freedom Alliance	30,812	Elected
2020 parliamentary	Kurunegala District	Sri Lanka Podujana Peramuna	Sri Lanka People's Freedom Alliance	66,814	Elected
