= Supreme Lanka Coalition =

Left-wing political alliance in Sri Lanka

Supreme Lanka Coalition උත්‍ත‍ර ලංකා සභාගය உத்தர லங்கா சபாகய Uttara Lanka Sabhagaya
- Chairman: Wimal Weerawansa
- Secretary: Dr G. Weerasinghe
- Deputy Chairman: Udaya Gammanpila; Tissa Vitharana
- Founded: 4 September 2022
- Split from: Sri Lanka People's Freedom Alliance
- Succeeded by: Sarvajana Balaya
- Political position: Left-wing to far-left
- Parliament of Sri Lanka: 0 / 225

The Uttara Lanka Sabhagaya (Sinhala: උත්‍ත‍ර ලංකා සභාගය, Tamil: உத்தர லங்கா சபாகய) or Supreme Lanka Coalition was a political alliance in Sri Lanka formed in 2022. The coalition was made up of seven Sri Lankan leftist and nationalist parties who were formerly part of the SLPP-led Sri Lanka People's Freedom Alliance, before defecting to the opposition amidst the 2022 economic crisis and political crisis. The first conference of the alliance was held on 4 September 2022. Leader of the National Freedom Front (NFF) and former cabinet minister Wimal Weerawansa was the party chairman.

== History ==
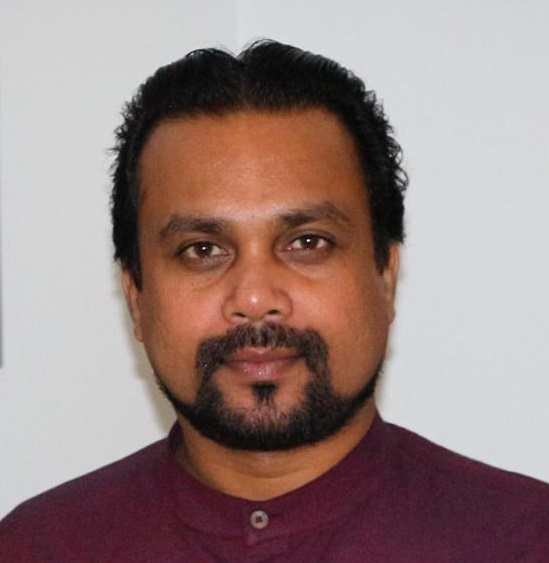
Wimal Weerawansa, leader of the National Freedom Front (NFF) and former cabinet minister has been the chairman of the Supreme Lanka Coalition since its inception.

On 31 October 2019, seventeen parties including the SLPP and SLFP signed an agreement at the Sri Lanka Foundation Institute in Colombo to form the Sri Lanka People's Freedom Alliance, a political alliance led by former president Mahinda Rajapaksa. The alliance supported Rajapaksa's younger brother and SLPP candidate Gotabaya Rajapaksa in the 2019 presidential election, who later won the election to become President of Sri Lanka, and Mahinda Rajapaksa was installed as Prime Minister. The alliance then went on to contest in the 2020 Sri Lankan parliamentary elections, claiming a landslide victory and winning 145 seats.

Between 2021 and 2022, however, the Rajapaksa government was beginning to lose much of its popularity. The ongoing economic crisis was only getting worse due to poor mismanagement by the government. By 2021, the foreign debt of Sri Lanka had risen to 101% of the nation's GDP. The government was also becoming highly nepotistic, with Rajapaksa family brothers Basil Rajapaksa as finance minister and Mahinda Rajapaksa as prime minister, and several more members of the Rajapaksa family holding prominent positions in the government.

On 5 April 2022, amidst increasing discontent with the Rajapaksa government, 16 MPs formerly aligned with the SLFPA government chose to remain independent in the parliament, along with several other key allies of the SLPP. 15 of these MPs would go on to form the Supreme Lanka Coalition.

On 4 September 2022, the group of 7 independent leftist political parties launched their new political alliance, the "Supreme Lanka Coalition", and the first general conference for the alliance was held on the same day.

The coalition was launched only a few days after 13 SLPP MPs left the government and crossed over to the opposition as independent MPs, including SLPP chairman G. L. Peiris and SLPP MP Dullas Alahapperuma, who unsuccessfully challenged then-acting president Ranil Wickremesinghe to complete the remainder of Gotabaya Rajapkasa's term in the 2022 Sri Lankan presidential election. The Supreme Lanka Coalition has considered the possibility of working with Alahapperuma.

The parties of the Supreme Lanka Coalition included:

- Democratic Left Front
- Lanka Sama Samaja Party
- Communist Party of Sri Lanka
- National Freedom Front
- Piwithuru Hela Urumaya
- Vijaya Dharani National Council
- Yuthukama National Organization
- Sri Lanka Mahajana Pakshaya
