= S. M. M. Muszhaaraff =

Sri Lankan politician

Hon. S. M. M. Muszhaaraff MP
- එස්. එම්. එම්. මුෂාරෆ් எஸ். எம். எம். முஷாரப்

Member of Parliament for Digamadulla District
- Incumbent
- Assumed office 2020

Personal details
- Born: 10 June 1983 (age 42) Pottuvil, Sri Lanka
- Party: All Ceylon Makkal Congress
- Spouse: Shihnas Mohideen
- Education: Bachelor of Laws (LLB)
- Occupation: Attorney-at-Law

S. M. M. Muszhaaraff (Tamil: எஸ். எம். எம். முஷாரப்; Sinhala: එස්. එම්. එම්. මුෂාරෆ්; (born 10 June 1983) is a Sri Lankan politician and member of Parliament for Digamadulla District.

== Early life ==
Muszhaaraff was born on 10 June 1983. He is the son of Meeralebbe Safiul Muthunabeen & Meerashahibu Katheeja Beevi.

== Career ==
Muszhaaraff worked as a TV presenter and producer. He has won several State Awards for his shows.

== Electoral history ==
Electoral history of S. M. M. Muszhaaraff
Election	Constituency	Party	Votes	Result
2020 parliamentary	Digamadulla District	All Ceylon Makkal Congress	18,389	Elected
