= Ishak Rahuman =

Sri Lankan politician

Hon. Abdul Rahuman Ishak MP
- அப்துல் ரஹுமான் இஷாக் අබ්දුල් රහුමාන් ඉෂාක්

Anuradhapura District
- In office 2015–2020
- In office 2020–2024

Personal details
- Born: 1 September 1972 (age 53) Kalawewa
- Party: United National Party
- Other political affiliations: New Democratic Front
- Spouse: A G S Fakira
- Children: Ifthy Ishak, Inthifa Ishak, Abdul Rahuman Ishak
- Occupation: Politician
- Profession: Business Man

Ishak Rahuman is a Sri Lankan politician and a member of the Sri Lankan parliament from Anuradhapura Electoral District as a member of the United National Party.
