= Janaka Thisa Kuttiarachchi =

Sri Lankan politician

Janaka Thisa Kuttiarachchi ජනක තිසකුට්ටි ආරච්චි
- னக திசக்குட்டியாராச்சி

Personal details
- Born: February 1, 1980 (age 46)
- Party: Sri Lanka Podujana Peramuna (since 2017); Sri Lanka Freedom Party (2014-2015); United National Party (2000-2014) (2015-2017)
- Education: Ananda College

Janaka Thisa Kuttiarachchi is a member of the Uva Provincial Council representing the Monaragala District. According to his official biography on the Parliament of Sri Lanka website, Thisa Kuttiarachchi has only completed his basic education at Ananda College.

Thisa joined the UNP following his uncle, Gunapala Kuttiarachchi, who was the UNP MP for Hambantota. He won both local and provincial elections, and in 2009, he was elected as a member of the Uva Provincial Council with the highest number of votes.

In September 2023, Thissakuttiarachchi was criticized for unethical behaviour in Parliament. During a parliamentary session, the Women and Media Collective issued a statement condemning his inappropriate remarks and conduct towards female MPs.
