= Gayashan Nawananda =

Sri Lankan physician, politician and Member of Parliament

Hon. Gayashan Nawananda MP
- ගයාශාන් නවනන්ද கயஷன் நவானந்தா

Member of the Parliament of Sri Lanka
- Incumbent
- Assumed office 2020
- Constituency: Monaragala District

Personal details
- Born: 25 March 1990 (age 36)
- Party: Sri Lanka Podujana Peramuna
- Other political affiliations: Sri Lanka People's Freedom Alliance
- Education: Rajarata University of Sri Lanka
- Occupation: Physician

Gayashan Nawananda (Sinhala: ගයාශාන් නවනන්ද; born 25 March 1990) is a Sri Lankan physician, politician and Member of Parliament.

Nawananda was born on 25 March 1990. He has a degree in medicine from the Rajarata University of Sri Lanka. He was Chief Medical Officer at Hambegamuwa Regional Hospital.

Nawananda contested the 2020 parliamentary election as a Sri Lanka People's Freedom Alliance electoral alliance candidate in Monaragala District and was elected to the Parliament of Sri Lanka.

Electoral history of Gayashan Nawananda
Election	Constituency	Party	Alliance	Votes	Result
2020 parliamentary	Monaragala District	Sri Lanka Podujana Peramuna	Sri Lanka People's Freedom Alliance	45,384	Elected
