= Chaminda Sampath =

Sri Lankan politician

Hon. Chaminda Sampath MP
- චමින්ද සම්පත් சமிந்த சம்பத்

Galle District
- Incumbent
- Assumed office 2020

Personal details
- Party: Sri Lanka Podujana Peramuna
- Other political affiliations: Sri Lanka People's Freedom Alliance

Athukoralage Kariyawasam Chaminda Sampath is a Sri Lankan politician and a member of the Sri Lankan parliament from Galle Electoral District as a member of the Sri Lanka Podujana Peramuna.
