= Chaminda Wijesiri =

Sri Lankan politician

Hon. Chaminda Wijesiri MP
- චමින්ද විජේසිරි சமிந்த விஜேசிரி

Member of Parliament for Badulla
- Incumbent
- Assumed office 21 November 2024
- In office 17 August 2015 – 9 January 2024
- Succeeded by: Nayana Wasalathilake

Personal details
- Born: 4 August 1980 (age 45)
- Party: Samagi Jana Balawegaya (after 2020)
- Other political affiliations: United National Party (before 2020)
- Profession: Politician

Chaminda Wijesiri (born 4 August 1980) is a Sri Lankan politician and member of the Parliament of Sri Lanka. He was elected from the Badulla District in 2015. He was a member of the United National Party and later the Samagi Jana Balawegaya.
