= Marjan Faleel =

Sri Lankan politician

Hon. Marjan Faleel.
- மர்ஜான் பளீல் මර්ජාන් ෆලීල්

Member of the Parliament of Sri Lanka
- Incumbent
- Assumed office 2020
- Constituency: National List

Personal details
- Born: Mohamed Marjan Faleel Asmi; 10 June 1962 (age 63)
- Party: Sri Lanka Podujana Peramuna
- Other political affiliations: Sri Lanka People's Freedom Alliance

. Mohamed Faleel Marjan Asmi (born 10 June 1962) is a Sri Lankan politician and Member of Parliament.

Marjan Faleel was born on 10 June 1962. He is the son of M S M Faleel Hajiar, former western provincial council member and former chairman of the Beruwala Urban Council. Marjan Faleel also served as chairman of the urban council. Following the 2020 parliamentary election he was appointed to the Parliament of Sri Lanka as a National List MP representing the Sri Lanka People's Freedom Alliance.
