= Gevindu Kumaratunga =

Sri Lankan politician

Hon. Gevindu Kumaratunga
- ගෙවිඳු කුමාරතුංග கெவிந்து குமாரதுங்க

Member of the Parliament of Sri Lanka
- Incumbent
- Assumed office 20 August 2020
- Constituency: National List

Personal details
- Born: 10 December 1964 (age 61)
- Party: Sri Lanka Podujana Peramuna
- Other political affiliations: Sri Lanka People's Freedom Alliance
- Education: Royal College, Colombo

Gevindu Kumaratunga (born 30 November 1964) is a Sri Lankan politician and Member of Parliament.

Kumaratunga was born on 30 November 1964. He is the grandson of writer Kumaratunga Munidasa and secretary of the Cumaratunga Munidasa Foundation. He is the owner of Visidunu Prakashakayo publishers and Kiyawana Nuwana bookshop in Nugegoda. He is chairman of Yuthukama Sanwada Kawaya, a group affiliated to the Sri Lanka Podujana Peramuna. Following the 2020 parliamentary election he was appointed to the Parliament of Sri Lanka as a National List MP representing the Sri Lanka People's Freedom Alliance.
