= Kulasingam Thileepan =

Sri Lankan Tamil politician

Hon. Kulasingam Thileepan MP
- குலசிங்கம் திலீபன் කුලසිංහම් තිලීපන්

Member of the Parliament of Sri Lanka
- Incumbent
- Assumed office 2020
- Constituency: Vanni District

District Coordinating Committee Chairmen
- Incumbent
- Assumed office 2020
- Constituency: Vavuniya District

Personal details
- Born: May 22, 1979 (age 46) Vavuniya
- Citizenship: Srilankan
- Party: Eelam People’s Democratic Party
- Other political affiliations: Sri Lanka People's Freedom Alliance
- Relations: Mrs. Dhileeban Thangeswary (Wife)
- Children: Dhileeban Akash, Dhileeban Abinash

Kulasingam Thileepan also spelt Dhileeban is a Sri Lankan Tamil politician and a member of the Sri Lankan parliament from Vanni Electoral District as a member of the Eelam People’s Democratic Party.

== Electoral history ==
Electoral history of Kulasingam Thileepan
Election	Constituency	Party	Votes	Result
2020 parliamentary	Vanni District	Eelam People's Democratic Party	3,203	Elected
