= Nayana Wasalathilake =

Sri Lankan politician

Hon. Nayana Wasalathike MP
- නයන වාසලතිලක

Member of Parliament for Badulla
- Incumbent
- Assumed office 12 January 2024
- Preceded by: Chaminda Wijesiri

Personal details
- Party: Samagi Jana Balawegaya
- Profession: Politician

Nayana Wasalathilake is a Sri Lankan businessman and politician who became a member of the Parliament of Sri Lanka from the Badulla District following the resignation of Chaminda Wijesiri. He is a member of the Samagi Jana Balawegaya. In 2023, ahead of the fourth edition of Lanka Premier League, Wasalthilaka acquired the Galle franchise of the league, which was known as Galle Gladiators. The franchise changed its name to Galle Titans under his ownership.
