= Mujibur Rahman (Sri Lankan politician) =

Sri Lankan politician

Hon. Mujibur Rahman MP
- මුජිබුර් රහ්මාන් முஜிபுர் ரஹ்மான்

Member of Parliament for Colombo District
- Incumbent
- Assumed office 21 November 2024
- In office 1 September 2015 – 19 January 2023
- Succeeded by: A. H. M. Fowzie

Member of Parliament for National List
- In office 10 May 2024 – 24 September 2024
- Preceded by: Diana Gamage

Member of the Western Provincial Council for Colombo District
- In office 2014–2015

Personal details
- Born: Mohamed Mujibur Rahman; April 17, 1968 (age 58) Colombo, Sri Lanka
- Party: Samagi Jana Balawegaya (since 2020)
- Other political affiliations: United National Party (until 2020)
- Education: Zahira College

Mohamed Mujibur Rahman (born 17 April 1968; Tamil: முஜிபுர் ரஹ்மான்; Sinhala: අබු මුජිබර් රහමන්) is a Sri Lankan politician and National List Member of Parliament. He previously served as a member of the Western Provincial Council for six years before being elected to parliament in 2015. Rahman resigned his seat in parliament on 19 January 2023 to run for Mayor of Colombo, but was reappointed to parliament in 2024.
