= Democratic Left Front (Sri Lanka) =

Democratic Left Front ප්‍රජාතන්ත්‍රවාදී වාමාංශික පෙරමුණ ஜனநாயக இடதுசாரி முன்னணி
- Leader: Vasudeva Nanayakkara
- Founder: Vasudeva Nanayakkara
- Founded: 1999; 27 years ago
- Preceded by: Left & Democratic Alliance
- Headquarters: 49 – 1/1, Vinayalankara Mawatha, Colombo 10.
- Ideology: Socialism
- National affiliation: Former: PA; UPFA; SLPFA; SLC; FPA; SB
- Parliament: 0 / 225
- Local Government: 4 / 7,842

Election symbol
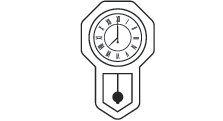
- Clock

The Democratic Left Front (DLF; Sinhala: ප්‍රජාතන්ත්‍රවාදී වාමාංශික පෙරමුණ, romanized: Prajathanthravadi Vamanshika Peramuna, PVP; Tamil: ஜனநாயக இடதுசாரி முன்னணி, romanized: Jaṉanāyaka Iṭatucāri Muṉṉaṇi, JIM) is a political party in Sri Lanka. The party was formerly a member of the Sarvajana Balaya before endorsing president Anura Kumara Dissanayake's National People's Power in the 2024 general elections.
