= Rajika Wickramasinghe =

Sri Lankan politician

Hon. Rajika Wickramasinghe MP
- රාජිකා වික්රමසිංහ ராஜிகா விக்கிரமசிங்க

Member of the Parliament of Sri Lanka
- Incumbent
- Assumed office 2020
- Constituency: Kegalle District

Personal details
- Born: Rajika Priyanganee Wickramasinghe; 5 August 1973 (age 52)
- Party: Sri Lanka Podujana Peramuna
- Other political affiliations: Sri Lanka People's Freedom Alliance

Rajika Priyanganee Wickramasinghe (born 5 August 1973) is a Sri Lankan politician and Member of Parliament.

Wickramasinghe was born on 5 August 1973. She contested the 2015 parliamentary election as one of the United People's Freedom Alliance (UPFA) electoral alliance's candidates in Kegalle District but failed to get elected after coming 5th amongst the UPFA candidates. She contested the 2020 parliamentary election as a Sri Lanka People's Freedom Alliance electoral alliance candidate in Kegalle District and was elected to the Parliament of Sri Lanka.

Electoral history of Rajika Wickramasinghe
Election	Constituency	Party	Alliance	Votes	Result
2015 parliamentary	Kegalle District		United People's Freedom Alliance	62,037	Not elected
2020 parliamentary	Kegalle District	Sri Lanka Podujana Peramuna	Sri Lanka People's Freedom Alliance	68,802	Elected
