= Sudath Manjula =

Sri Lankan politician (born 1972)

Hon. Sudath Manjula MP
- සුදත් මංජුල சுதத் மஞ்சுளா

Member of the Parliament of Sri Lanka
- Incumbent
- Assumed office 2020
- Constituency: Kegalle District

Personal details
- Born: 10 December 1972 (age 53)
- Party: Sri Lanka Podujana Peramuna
- Other political affiliations: Sri Lanka People's Freedom Alliance

L. H. Sudath Manjula (born 10 December 1972) is a Sri Lankan politician and Member of Parliament.

Manjula was born on 10 December 1972. He was educated at Ruwanwella Rajasinghe Maha Vidyalaya.

Manjula was a member of Ruwanwella Divisional Council. He was arrested in December 2013 over an alleged assault of a Department of Archaeology employee. He contested the 2020 parliamentary election as a Sri Lanka People's Freedom Alliance electoral alliance candidate in Kegalle District and was elected to the Parliament of Sri Lanka.

Electoral history of Sudath Manjula
Election	Constituency	Party	Alliance	Votes	Result
2020 parliamentary	Kegalle District	Sri Lanka Podujana Peramuna	Sri Lanka People's Freedom Alliance	45,970	Elected
