= Sumith Udukumbura =

Sri Lankan politician

Hon. Sumith Udukumbura MP
- සුමිත් උඩුකුඹුර சுமித் உடுகும்புரா

Member of the Parliament of Sri Lanka
- In office 2020–2024
- Constituency: Kurunegala District

Personal details
- Born: Udu Kumburage Sumith Udukumbura Weerasinghe; 15 January 1975 (age 51)
- Party: Sri Lanka Podujana Peramuna
- Other political affiliations: Sri Lanka People's Freedom Alliance

Udu Kumburage Sumith Udukumbura Weerasinghe (born 15 January 1975) is a Sri Lankan politician and Member of Parliament.

Udukumbura was born on 15 January 1975. He was educated at St. Anne's College, Kurunegala. He was a police officer. In January 2010 his home attacked with hand bombs. He is the Sri Lanka Podujana Peramuna's organiser in Hiriyala.

Udukumbura was a member of Ibbagamuwa Divisional Council. He contested the 2020 parliamentary election as a Sri Lanka People's Freedom Alliance electoral alliance candidate in Kurunegala District and was elected to the Parliament of Sri Lanka.

Electoral history of Sumith Udukumbura
Election	Constituency	Party	Alliance	Votes	Result
2020 parliamentary	Kurunegala District	Sri Lanka Podujana Peramuna	Sri Lanka People's Freedom Alliance	51,134	Elected
