= Gunapala Rathnasekara =

Sri Lankan academic and politician

Hon. Gunapala Rathnasekara
- ගුණපාල රත්නසේකර குணபால ரத்னசேகர

Member of the Parliament of Sri Lanka
- In office 20 August 2020 – 24 September 2024
- Constituency: Kurunegala District

Personal details
- Born: Basnayaka Yasarathnalage Gunapala Rathnasekara; 7 December 1961 (age 64)
- Party: Sri Lanka Podujana Peramuna
- Other political affiliations: Sri Lanka People's Freedom Alliance
- Education: University of Sri Jayewardenepura; Sri Krishnadevaraya University
- Occupation: Academic

Basnayaka Yasarathnalage Gunapala Rathnasekara (born 7 December 1961) is a Sri Lankan academic, politician and Member of Parliament.

Rathnasekara was born on 7 December 1961. He has a BSc degree from the University of Sri Jayewardenepura and a MCom degree from the Sri Krishnadevaraya University. He is a senior lecturer in the University of Sri Jayewardenepura's Department of Accounting. He is director of the Kurunegala Sipwin Private Tuition Institute. He is a member of Viyathmaga (Path of the Learned), a pro-Rajapaksa, nationalist group of academics, businesspeople and professionals.

Rathnasekara contested the 2020 parliamentary election as a Sri Lanka People's Freedom Alliance electoral alliance candidate in Kurunegala District and was elected to the Parliament of Sri Lanka.

Electoral history of Gunapala Rathnasekara
Election	Constituency	Party	Alliance	Votes	Result
2020 parliamentary	Kurunegala District	Sri Lanka Podujana Peramuna	Sri Lanka People's Freedom Alliance	141,991	Elected
