= Karuna Kodithuwakku =

Sri Lankan politician

Hon. Karuna Kodithuwakku MP
- කරුණා කොඩිතුවක්කු கருணாதாச கொடிகள்

Member of the Parliament of Sri Lanka
- Incumbent
- Assumed office 2020
- Constituency: Matara District

Personal details
- Born: 15 June 1961 (age 64)
- Party: Sri Lanka Podujana Peramuna
- Other political affiliations: Sri Lanka People's Freedom Alliance

Karunadasa Kodithuwakku (Sinhala: කරුණාදාස කොඩිතුවක්කු; born 15 June 1961) is a Sri Lankan politician and Member of Parliament.

Kodithuwakku was born on 15 June 1961. He was educated at Horagoda Maha Vidyalaya. He is a businessman.

Kodithuwakku contested the 2020 parliamentary election as a Sri Lanka People's Freedom Alliance electoral alliance candidate in Matara District and was elected to the Parliament of Sri Lanka.

Electoral history of Karuna Kodithuwakku
Election	Constituency	Party	Alliance	Votes	Result
2020 parliamentary	Matara District	Sri Lanka Podujana Peramuna	Sri Lanka People's Freedom Alliance	114,319	Elected
