= Upul Galappaththi =

Sri Lankan physician and politician

Hon. Upul Galappaththi MP
- උපුල් ගලප්පත්ති உபுல் கலப்பட்டி

Member of the Parliament of Sri Lanka
- Incumbent
- Assumed office 2020
- Constituency: Hambantota District

Personal details
- Born: Upul Sanjeewa Galappaththi; 7 February 1979 (age 47)
- Party: Sri Lanka Podujana Peramuna
- Other political affiliations: Sri Lanka People's Freedom Alliance
- Education: University of Ruhuna
- Occupation: Physician

Upul Sanjeewa Galappaththi (born 7 February 1979) is a Sri Lankan physician, politician and Member of Parliament.

Galappaththi was born on 7 February 1979. He was educated at Tissamaharama National School and Debarawewa National School. He has a degree in medicine from the University of Ruhuna. He was the Hambantota District Co-ordinator for the Government Medical Officers Association and founder of the Hela Bodu Maga.

Galappaththi contested the 2020 parliamentary election as a Sri Lanka People's Freedom Alliance electoral alliance candidate in Hambantota District and was elected to the Parliament of Sri Lanka.

Electoral history of Upul Galappaththi
Election	Constituency	Party	Alliance	Votes	Result
2020 parliamentary	Hambantota District	Sri Lanka Podujana Peramuna	Sri Lanka People's Freedom Alliance	63,369	Elected
