= Amarakeerthi Athukorala =

Sri Lankan politician (1964–2022)

- අමරකීර්ති අතුකෝරල அமரகீர்த்தி அதுகோரள

Member of Parliament for Polonnaruwa District
- In office 20 August 2020 – 9 May 2022

Personal details
- Born: 23 December 1964 Ceylon
- Died: 9 May 2022 (aged 57) Nittambuwa, Sri Lanka
- Party: Sri Lanka Podujana Peramuna
- Other political affiliations: Sri Lanka People's Freedom Alliance

Amarakeerthi Athukorala (23 December 1964 – 9 May 2022) was a Sri Lankan politician and a member of the Podujana Peramuna in the Sri Lankan parliament from Polonnaruwa Electoral District.

During the 2022 Sri Lankan protests after armed loyalists of former Prime Minister Mahinda Rajapaksa launched a violent attack against peaceful protestors violence erupted against government politicians. In the town of Nittambuwa, Athukorala's vehicle confronted a mob during which Athukorala's body guard opened fire, killing a man and wounding another. He later escaped along with his bodyguard and sought refuge in a nearby building, where they were later found dead. (Note: Initially it was disputed if they were killed by the mob or if both committed suicide, but subsequent investigations revealed they had been beaten to death by the angry mob)

== See also ==
- List of members of the Sri Lankan Parliament who died in office
