= Vasudeva Nanayakkara =

Sri Lankan politician

Hon. Vasudeva Nanayakkara
- වාසුදේව නානායක්කාර வாசுதேவ நாணயக்கார
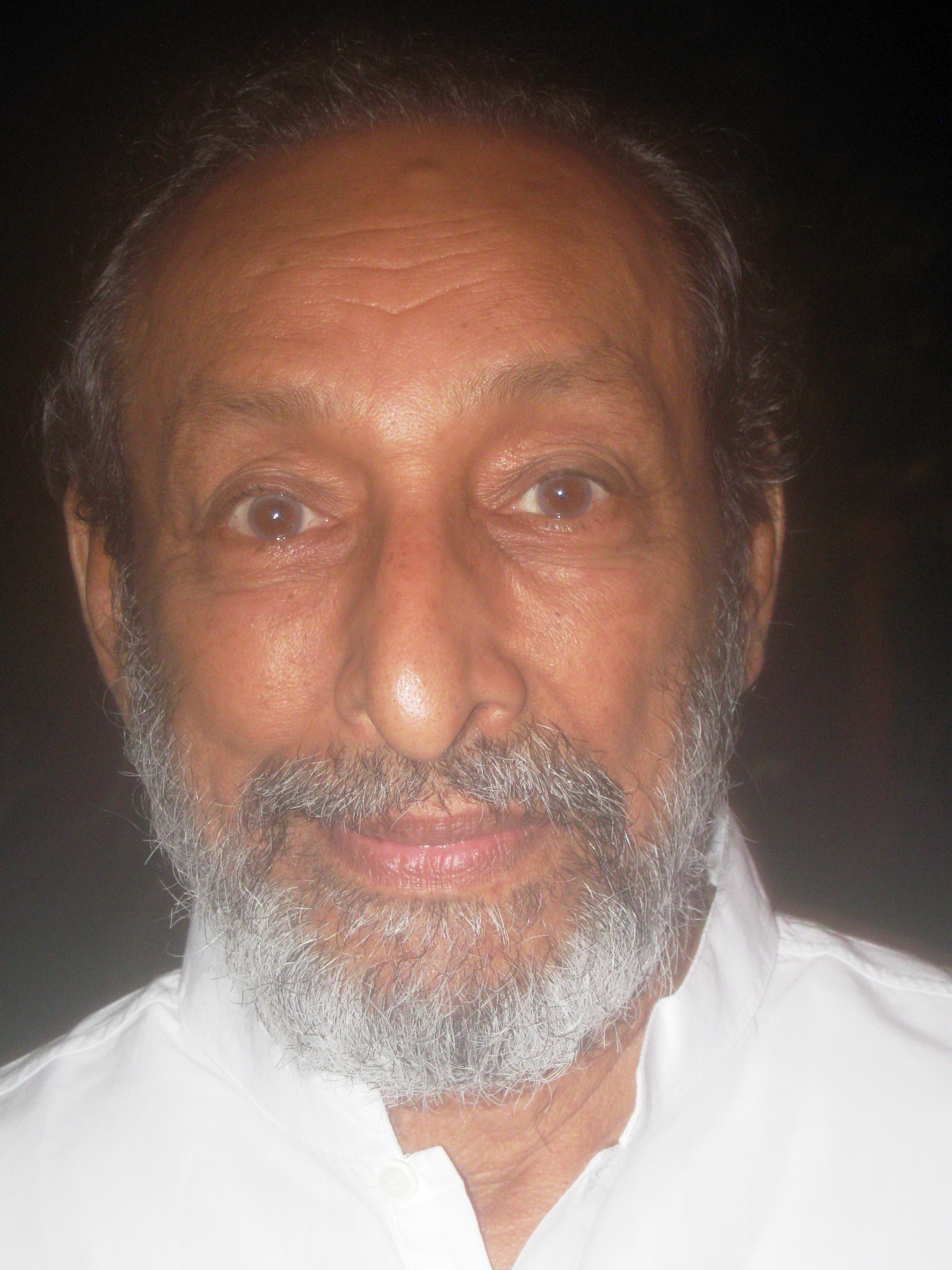

Leader of the Democratic Left Front
- Incumbent
- Assumed office 1999

Minister of Water Supply
- In office 2020–2022

Member of Parliament for Ratnapura District
- In office 2010 – 24 September 2024
- In office 1989–2000

Member of Parliament for Kiriella
- In office 27 May 1970 – 21 July 1977

Leader of the Opposition, Colombo Municipal Council
- In office 2006–2010

Personal details
- Born: 3 January 1939 (age 87) Galle, Sri Lanka.
- Party: Democratic Left Front (1999 - Present); Lanka Sama Samaja Party (1958 - 1977, 1994 - 1999); Nava Sama Samaja Party (1977 - 1994)
- Other political affiliations: Sri Lanka People's Freedom Alliance
- Spouse: Wasanthi Nanayakkara
- Relations: Yasapalitha (brother); Hemakumara (brother)
- Children: 3
- Education: Richmond College, Galle, University of Colombo
- Profession: Lawyer

Vasudeva Nanayakkara (Sinhala: වාසුදේව නානායක්කාර; Tamil: வாசுதேவ நாணயக்கார) (born 3 January 1939) is a Sri Lankan left-wing politician, Member of Parliament and presidential candidate in the 1982 and 1999 Sri Lankan presidential elections.

== Early life ==
Born to a wealthy business family from the Udalamatta village near Galle in the south of Ceylon, on 3 January 1939. His father Francis Nanayakkara was a successful businessmen with ventures in wholesale trade, transport and plantations. His mother was Irene Elizabeth Wijesekara Dissanayake. He had four brothers and four sisters which included Yasapalitha Nanayakkara and Hemakumara Nanayakkara. Receiving his secondary education at Richmond College, Galle he was of contemporary of Mahinda Rajapaksa. Nanayakkara's family were strong supporters of the United National Party, however he was converted to socialism by Tissa Vitharana. He entered the Ceylon Law College, qualifying as an proctor and started his legal practice.

== Politics ==
Nanayakkara joined the Lanka Sama Samaja Party (LSSP) as student in 1958. He was elected to parliament at the 1970 parliamentary election, representing Kiriella for the LSSP.

Nanayakkara later left the LSSP and in 1977 joined with other former members of the LSSP, including Vikramabahu Karunaratne, to form the Nava Sama Samaja Party (NSSP). He was the NSSP's candidate in Ehaliyagoda at 1977 parliamentary election but failed to get elected. He was the NSSP's candidate at the 1982 presidential election. He came fifth and last after receiving only 17,005 votes (0.26%).

The Sri Lankan government proscribed the NSSP, Janatha Vimukthi Peramuna (JVP) and Communist Party of Sri Lanka (CP) after the Black July anti-Tamil riots of 1983. Nanayakkara, Karunaratne, Rohana Wijeweera and other left-wing politicians went into hiding until 1985 when the proscription was lifted.

In 1987 the NSSP joined with the LSSP, CP and Sri Lanka People's Party to form the United Socialist Alliance (USA). Nanayakkara re-entered parliament after the 1989 parliamentary election, representing Ratnapura District for the USA.

Shortly before the 1994 parliamentary election Nanayakkara left the NSSP and rejoined the LSSP, one of the constituent parties of the People's Alliance (PA), an alliance of opposition parties. He was chosen as one of the PA's parliamentary candidates for Ratnapura District and duly elected. Later Nanayakkara became critical of President Kumaratunga's policies, such as privatisation and the handling of the civil war. He was suspended from the LSSP in April 1999. A few days later Nanayakkara crossed over to the opposition in parliament.

Nanayakkara then formed a new party called the Left & Democratic Alliance and stood as its candidate, against President Kumaratunga, at the 1999 presidential election. He came seventh after receiving 23,668 votes (0.28%).

The Left & Democratic Alliance was later renamed the Democratic Left Front (DLF). It joined the United People's Freedom Alliance (UPFA), the successor to the PA. Nanayakkara was chosen as the UPFA's mayoral candidate for Colombo at the 2006 local government elections. He was elected to the Colombo Municipal Council but the UPFA failed to gain control of the council. Nanayakkara became the leader of the opposition on the council.

Nanayakkara was chosen as one of the UPFA's parliamentary candidates for Ratnapura District at the 2010 parliamentary election. He was duly elected.

Nanayakkara was appointed the minister of Water supply in 2020 but was removed by President Gotabaya Rajapaksa. He then cross to the opposition.

== Controversies ==
In a heated debate in the Parliament Vasudeva shouted at Prime Minister Ranil Wickremesinghe in foul language and called him 'Pakaya' which went viral over the internet. In a media interview, the prime minister called him ‘dried pumpkin’ when asked about the incident. Vasudeva later claimed that his language was unintentional but refused to apologise.

Again in 2017 Vasudeva used profane language and after government MP Harsha de Silva advised him to mind his language Vasudeva began insulting the PM, IGP, Attorney General and the Bribery Department claiming everything is under the Prime minister's buttocks which led to government ministers questioning if he was under Mahinda Rajapaksa's buttocks for which he replied that, "That was a blessing. Being under Mahinda’s buttocks was a great blessing.”

== Personal life ==
Nanayakkara was married to Wasanthi Nanayakkara and their daughter married a son of Justice C. V. Vigneswaran.

== See also ==
- List of political families in Sri Lanka
