= Freedom People's Congress =

Political party in Sri Lanka

Freedom People's Congress නිදහස ජනතා සභාව
- Founders: Dullas Alahapperuma; G. L. Peiris
- Founded: 2 September 2022 (3 years ago)
- Split from: Sri Lanka Podujana Peramuna
- Headquarters: Koswatte, Nawala
- Ideology: Capitalism; Economic liberalism; Anti-corruption; Anti-nepotism
- National affiliation: Samagi Jana Balawegaya
- Colours: Blue

The Freedom People's Congress (Sinhala: නිදහස ජනතා සභාව Nidahasa Janatha Sabha) is a political party in Sri Lanka founded by Dullas Alahapperuma, G. L. Peiris and several other former Sri Lanka Podujana Peramuna MPs in 2022.

== History ==
The party was formed after a faction of Sri Lanka Podujana Peramuna MPs led by Dullas Alahapperuma and G L Peris defected from the Rajapaksa-led party on 31 August 2022, and chose to sit in opposition as an independent group of MPs. This followed Alahapperuma's decision to stand in the 2022 presidential election, against the wishes of the majority of his party, who instead supported then-acting President Ranil Wickremesinghe.

A few days after the defection, the newly independent group named themselves the Freedom People's Congress, opening an office in Nawala.

In December 2023, G. L. Peiris announced that the FPC would form an alliance with the Samagi Jana Balawegaya, the main opposition party, in 2024. This alliance was launched as the Samagi Jana Sandanaya, and endorsed SJB leader Sajith Premadasa as its presidential candidate in the 2024 presidential elections.

== Ideology ==
Founding members stated that the party's aim was to introduce reforms to free Sri Lankan politics from corruption and nepotism and instead promote meritocracy.

The party's strategic framework emphasised the need to create political freedom and economic freedom, primarily through economic liberalism and free market capitalist economic policies, but also including interventionist policies such as foreign exchange controls.
