= K. P. S. Kumarasiri =

Sri Lankan politician

Hon. K. P. S. Kumarasiri MP
- කේපීඑස් කුමාරසිරි கேபிஎஸ் குமாரசிறி

Member of the Parliament of Sri Lanka
- Incumbent
- Assumed office 2020
- Constituency: Anuradhapura District

Member of the North Central Provincial Council
- In office 2012–2017
- Constituency: Anuradhapura District

Personal details
- Born: Kariyawasam Pathiranage Sarath Kumarasiri
- Party: Sri Lanka Podujana Peramuna
- Other political affiliations: Sri Lanka People's Freedom Alliance

Kariyawasam Pathiranage Sarath Kumarasiri is a Sri Lankan politician, former provincial minister and Member of Parliament.

Kumarasiri was a member of Nochchiyagama Divisional Council and North Central Provincial Council where he held a provincial ministerial portfolio. He contested the 2020 parliamentary election as a Sri Lanka People's Freedom Alliance electoral alliance candidate in Anuradhapura District and was elected to the Parliament of Sri Lanka.

Electoral history of K. P. S. Kumarasiri
Election	Constituency	Party	Alliance	Votes	Result
2012 provincial	Anuradhapura District		United People's Freedom Alliance	15,329	Elected
2020 parliamentary	Anuradhapura District	Sri Lanka Podujana Peramuna	Sri Lanka People's Freedom Alliance	49,030	Elected
