= 2022 Sri Lankan presidential election =

- 20 July 2022
- Turnout: 99.11%
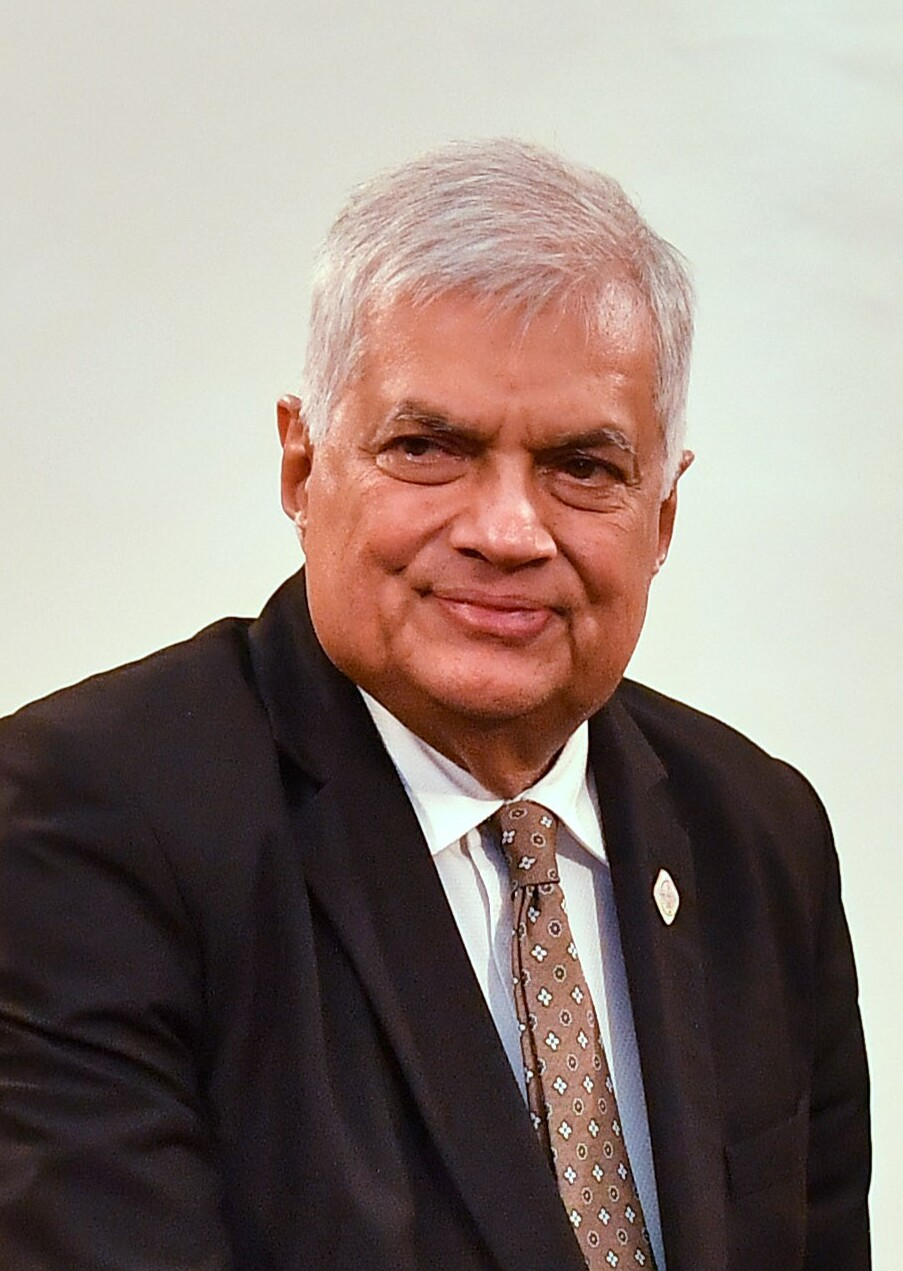

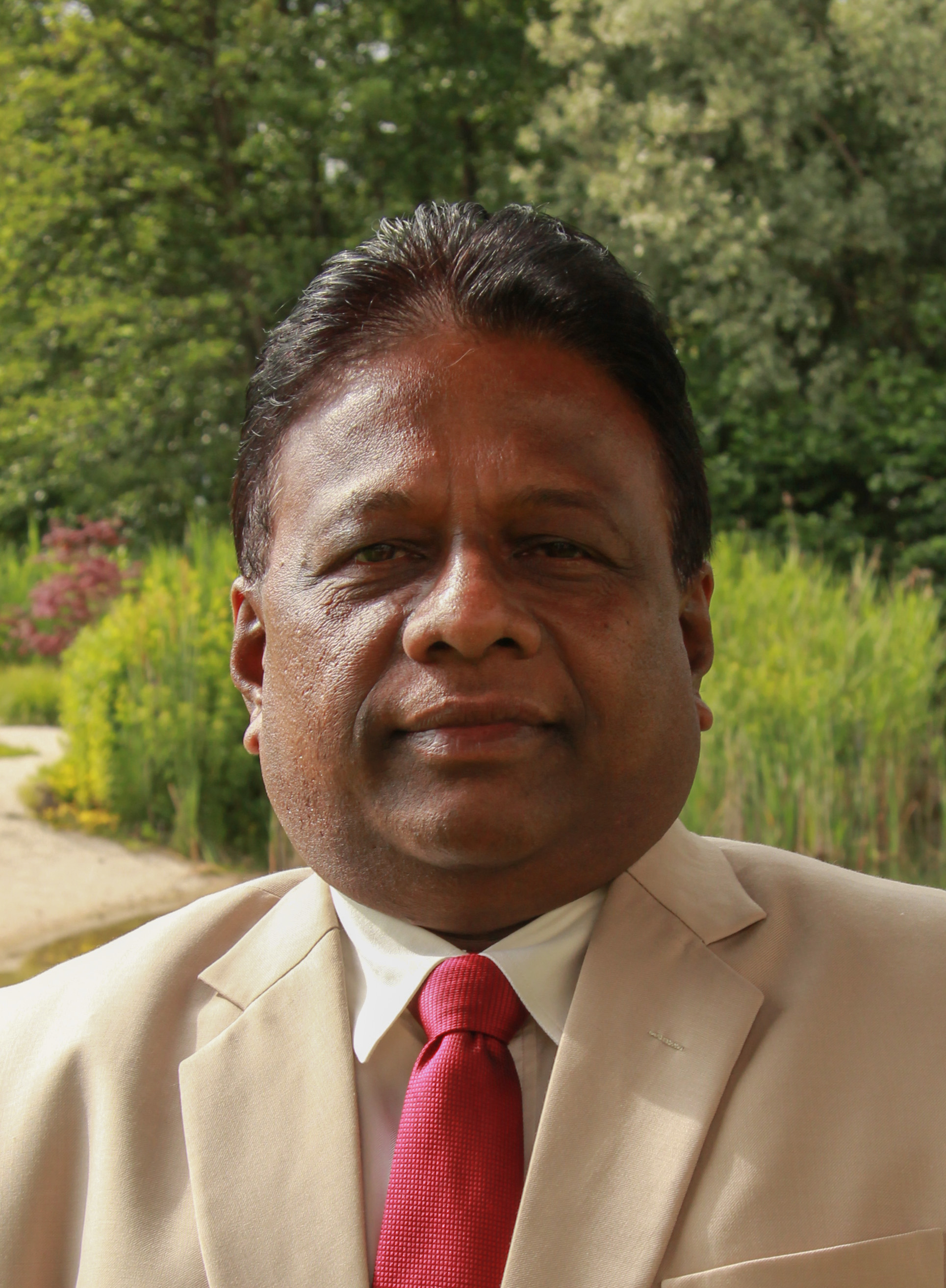
| Candidate | Ranil Wickremesinghe | Dullas Alahapperuma |
| Party | UNP | SLPP |
| Alliance | List: SLPP majority faction UNP | List: SLPP minority faction SJB SLFP TPA TNA ACMC SLMC |
| Electoral vote | 134 | 82 |
| Percentage | 61.19% | 37.44% |
President before election
Ranil Wickremesinghe (acting)
UNP
Elected President
Ranil Wickremesinghe
UNP

Indirect presidential elections were held in Sri Lanka on 20 July 2022, following the resignation of president Gotabaya Rajapaksa on 14 July. The president of Sri Lanka was elected by the Parliament in a secret ballot to decide who would complete the remainder of Gotabaya Rajapaksa's term. Candidates were nominated in the Parliament on 19 July in advance of the election the following day.

Ranil Wickremesinghe won the election with 134 votes and was elected as the ninth President of Sri Lanka. The election, which was held amidst a political crisis, was the first time in the history of Sri Lanka that a vote took place in Parliament to elect a president. (Note: There was one previous instance of electing a president by parliament in Sri Lanka in 1993, when following the assassination of President Ranasinghe Premadasa, Dingiri Banda Wijetunga (Prime Minister at the time) was elected to serve the remainder of Premadasa's term unanimously, without a vote. This time, since there were three nominated candidates, a vote was held.)

== Procedure ==
According to the Presidential Elections (Special Provisions) Act of 1981, "Where the office of President becomes vacant in terms of paragraph (1) of Article 38 of the Constitution, as provided by Article 40 of the Constitution, Parliament shall elect as President one of its members who is qualified to be elected to the office of President, to hold office for the unexpired period of the term of office of the President vacating office." Hence, following the resignation of Gotabaya Rajapaksa on 14 July, Parliament was charged with electing a replacement who would serve the remainder of Rajapaksa's term, which was supposed to end in November 2024. The process was led by the Secretary General of Parliament. The Speaker of the Parliament also had a vote in the election. The vote was held through a secret ballot.

=== Nominations ===
On 19 July nominations for the presidency was called for in Parliament. Sri Lanka Podujana Peramuna leader Dinesh Gunawardena nominated Ranil Wickremesinghe and Minister Manusha Nanayakkara seconded it. MP Vijitha Herath nominated Anura Kumara Dissanayake, seconded by MP Harini Amarasuriya. Opposition leader Sajith Premadasa nominated Dullas Alahapperuma's name which was seconded by SLPP chairman G. L. Peiris. The Secretary General of Parliament Dhammika Dasanayake announced the names of the nominees for president.

=== Voting ===
Parliament met at 10:00 on 20 July to elect the president through a secret ballot. Each MP was entitled to only one vote and the vote had to be marked with the number "1" in the box in front of the candidate's name with an option to mark preferences as there were multiple candidates.

After voting, the number of votes recorded for each candidate is counted. If a candidate receives more than half of the valid votes cast, the returning officer, i.e. the Secretary General of the Parliament, immediately announces that the candidate has been elected to the presidency. If no candidate gets more than half of the valid votes cast, the candidate with the lowest number of votes is eliminated from the competition. If each MP who voted as first preference for the candidate removed from the competition has their second preference, they will be added to the respective candidate. Even if no candidate has received more than half of the valid votes, the candidate who received the fewest votes in each calculation is removed from the competition, and votes are added to the remaining candidates in the second, third, etc. Even after doing so, if no candidate has obtained half of the valid number of votes, the election officer will declare that the candidate who obtained the majority of votes at the end of the counting as above has been elected to the office of President. Also, when the votes are equal between two or more candidates, a draw will be made at the sole discretion of the Returning Officer.

== Election schedule ==
According to the Presidential Elections (Special Provisions) Act of 1981, "Where the office of President becomes vacant in terms of paragraph (1) of Article 38 of the Constitution, as provided by Article 40 of the Constitution, Parliament shall elect as President one of its members who is qualified to be elected to the office of President, to hold office for the unexpired period of the term of office of the President vacating office." The constitution requires for a successor to be elected within 30 days.

| Date | Day | Event |
|---|---|---|
| 14 July 2022 | Thursday | Speaker receives a letter of resignation from President Gotabaya Rajapaksa |
| 15 July 2022 | Friday | Confirmation of Gotabaya Rajapaksa's resignation. |
| 15 July 2022 | Friday | Speaker announces presidential election through Parliament within seven days. |
| 16 July 2022 | Saturday | Secretary General of Parliament officially informs the House that the office of President has fallen vacant. |
| 17 July 2022 | Sunday | |
| 18 July 2022 | Monday | Acting President Ranil Wickremesinghe issues a state of emergency across the island. |
| 19 July 2022 | Tuesday | Nominations for the presidency were called for in Parliament. |
| 20 July 2022 | Wednesday | Parliament elected the new president by a secret ballot. |
| 21 July 2022 | Thursday | The President-elect took oaths as the new Head of State of Sri Lanka. |

== Candidates ==
| Candidate | Political office and constituency | Date declared | Proposer/ seconder | Notes | Ref. |
|---|---|---|---|---|---|
| Dullas Alahapperuma (63); Sri Lanka Podujana Peramuna | Holds no office Minister of Mass Media (2021–2022); Matara | 15 July 2022 | Sajith Premadasa; G. L. Peiris | Sajith Premadasa withdrew his candidacy and declared his support for Alahapperuma. SLFP, TPA, TNA, ACMC, SLMC and a fraction of SLPP have decided to vote for Alahapperuma. | |
| Ranil Wickremesinghe (73); United National Party | Acting President (15–21 July 2022); Prime Minister (12 May–21 July 2022); Leader of the United National Party (since 1994); National list | 16 July 2022 | Dinesh Gunawardena; Manusha Nanayakkara | Faction of SLPP including leader Dinesh Gunawardena, general-secretary Sagara Kariyawasam and SLPP Youth Wing declared their support for Wickremesinghe. | |
| Anura Kumara Dissanayake (53); National People's Power | Holds no office Leader of the Janatha Vimukthi Peramuna (since 2014); Colombo | 16 July 2022 | Vijitha Herath; Harini Amarasuriya | | |

=== Withdrawn ===
| Candidate | Political office and constituency | Date declared | Date Withdrawn | Notes | Ref. |
|---|---|---|---|---|---|
| Sajith Premadasa (55); Samagi Jana Balawegaya | Leader of the Opposition (2020–present); Leader of the Samagi Jana Balawegaya (since 2020); Colombo | 15 July 2022 | 19 July 2022 | Endorsed Alahapperuma. | |

=== Declined ===
- Maithripala Sirisena, (SLFP), MP from Polonnaruwa, former President of Sri Lanka (2015–2019)

=== Not nominated ===
- Mahinda Yapa Abeywardena, (SLPP), Speaker of the Parliament of Sri Lanka (2020–present), MP from Matara (2001–present)
- Sarath Fonseka, (SJB), MP from Gampaha (2020–present)
- M. A. Sumanthiran, (ITAK), MP from Jaffna (2015–present)

== Conduct ==
On 18 July the Speaker of the Parliament requested police to conduct investigations on those who publish posts on social media networks threatening and exerting pressure to MPs regarding the voting in the presidential election, and Police Headquarters gave instructions to the Computer Crimes Investigation Division to enforce the law against such people.

After media reporting that some political parties asked their MPs to take a photo of their ballot papers to check if they defied the party line, speaker and the secretary-general of the Parliament warned parliamentarians not to show their ballot papers to anybody else. The MPs were also barred from bringing their mobile phones to the ballot box. It was further informed that any moves to force an MP to photograph their ballot will result in them being banned from sitting in Parliament for seven years.

== Results ==
| Candidate | Party | Votes | % |
|---|---|---|---|
| Ranil Wickremesinghe | United National Party | 134 | 61.19 |
| Dullas Alahapperuma | Sri Lanka Podujana Peramuna | 82 | 37.44 |
| Anura Kumara Dissanayake | National People's Power | 3 | 1.37 |
| Total | | 219 | 100.00 |
| Valid votes | | 219 | 98.21 |
| Invalid/blank votes | | 4 | 1.79 |
| Total votes | | 223 | 100.00 |
| Registered voters/turnout | | 225 | 99.11 |

== Aftermath ==
Wickremesinghe was sworn in as the eighth executive president of Sri Lanka in the Parliament before Chief Justice Jayantha Jayasuriya. After Wickremesinghe was declared the winner, it was widely expected that the 2022 Sri Lankan protests would resume, as protestors had been demanding his resignation as prime minister.

The day after his victory, Wickremesinghe appointed SLPFA MP Dinesh Gunawardena as prime minister. Gunawardena and Wickremesinghe were classmates during school days.

On 22 July, Chinese president Xi Jinping congratulated Wickremesinghe on his election, stating that the country would "surely overcome temporary difficulties and push forward the process of economic and social recovery" under his leadership.

On August 3, Queen Elizabeth II of the United Kingdom congratulated Wickremesinghe on his election and stated she looked forward to strengthening bilateral ties between Sri Lanka and the UK.

== See also ==
- 16th Parliament of Sri Lanka
- 2022 in Sri Lanka
- 2022 Sri Lankan political crisis
