= Dullas Alahapperuma =

Sri Lankan politician (born 1959)

Hon. Dullas Alahapperuma MP
- ඩලස් අලහප්පෙරුම டல்லாஸ் அழகப்பெரும
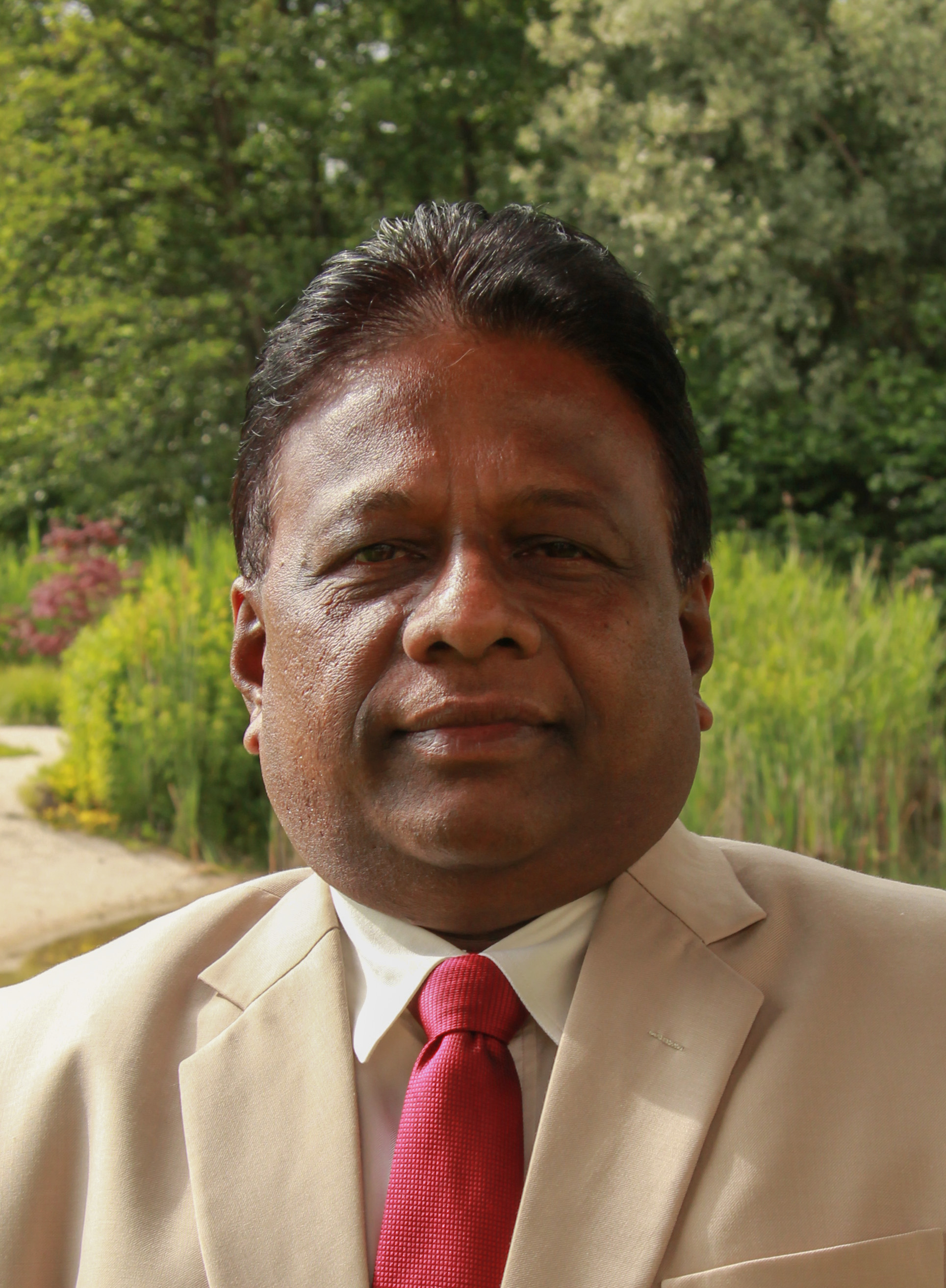
- Alahapperuma in 2014

Leader of the Freedom People's Congress
- Incumbent
- Assumed office 2 September 2022
- Preceded by: Position established

Minister of Mass Media
- In office 16 August 2021 – 3 April 2022
- President: Gotabaya Rajapaksa
- Prime Minister: Mahinda Rajapaksa
- Preceded by: Keheliya Rambukwella
- Succeeded by: Nalaka Godahewa

Minister of Power and Energy
- In office 12 August 2020 – 16 August 2021
- President: Gotabaya Rajapaksa
- Prime Minister: Mahinda Rajapaksa
- Preceded by: Mahinda Amaraweera
- Succeeded by: Gamini Lokuge

Minister of Sports and Youth Affairs
- In office 22 November 2019 – 12 August 2020
- President: Gotabaya Rajapaksa
- Prime Minister: Mahinda Rajapaksa
- Preceded by: Harin Fernando
- Succeeded by: Namal Rajapaksa

Member of Parliament for Matara District
- In office 2015–2024
- In office 1994–2001

Member of Parliament for National List
- In office 2005–2015
- Preceded by: Lakshman Kadirgamar

Personal details
- Born: Dullas Daham Kumara Alahapperuma; 14 May 1959 (age 67) Dikwella, Matara, Ceylon
- Party: Freedom People's Congress (since 2022)
- Other political affiliations: Sri Lanka Freedom Party (1994–2019); Sri Lanka Podujana Peramuna (2019–2022)
- Spouse: Pradeepa Dharmadasa
- Children: Mahima Induwara; Kaushika Nalanda
- Education: St. Servatius' College; Ananda College
- Occupation: Politician
- Profession: Journalist

Dullas Daham Kumara Alahapperuma (born 14 May 1959) is a Sri Lankan politician and founder and current leader of the Freedom People's Congress. Alahapperuma is also a former Cabinet Minister of Information and Mass Media and a former Member of Parliament from the Matara District.

== Early life ==
Alahapperuma was born on 14 May 1959 in Dikwella, Matara to Carolis and Aslin Alahapperuma, who were principals of local schools. Alahapperuma received his primary and secondary education at St. Servatius' College and Ananda College. He studied Political Science at the University of Iowa, for one and half years, but did not complete the degree.

== Political career ==
Alahapperuma started his career as a journalist, working at Lakmina before joining Divaina as an editor. He entered parliament for the first time in 1994 after topping the Matara preferential vote as a People's Alliance candidate with 76,678 votes.

He was re-elected in 2000 and served in the short-lived 11th Parliament of Sri Lanka. He was also appointed Deputy Minister of Samurdhi, Rural Development, Parliamentary Affairs & Up-country Development. He surprisingly decided not to contest the 2001 General Election. He said he was 'too white' to be in the parliament referring to corruption.

He was elected to Sri Lanka's 13th Parliament as a UPFA National List MP on 19 December 2005, winning by-polls on a seat that had fallen vacant following the assassination of then Foreign Minister Lakshman Kadirgamar. He was appointed the Minister of Transport in 2007.

He re-entered parliament in 2010 as a National List MP representing the UPFA and was subsequently appointed Minister of Youth Affairs. He voted in favour of the Eighteenth Amendment which gave the Executive President a wide range of powers including removing the term limit for re-election. In 2015, he voted in favour of the Nineteenth Amendment under President Sirisena which curtailed presidential powers.

He contested the 2015 parliamentary election as a UPFA candidate from Matara district and received 105,406 votes to enter parliament. In August 2016, he resigned from the Matara District SLFP leadership post. In 2019, he was appointed the Minister of Sports along with two other portfolios of Ministries of Education and Youth Affairs.

Alahapperuma contested the 2020 parliamentary election as a SLPP candidate from the Matara district and received 103,534 votes to enter parliament. He voted in favour of Twentieth Amendment which repealed 19th Amendment and restored more powers to the Executive President. In August 2020, Alahapperuma was appointed Minister of Power. In the August 2021 cabinet reshuffle, he was appointed Minister of Mass Media. He resigned from his cabinet portfolio in April 2022 as the 2022 Sri Lankan political crisis deepened amid civil protests.

In July 2022, following the resignation of President Gotabaya Rajapaksa, Alahapperuma announced that he would run for president in the upcoming presidential election to elect Gotabaya Rajapaksa's successor. Alahapperuma was backed by Leader of the Opposition Sajith Premadasa and SLPP Chairman and MP Professor G. L. Peiris. Alahapperuma lost the election to acting president Ranil Wickremesinghe.

On 31 August 2022, Dullas Alahapperuma and 13 others left the Sri Lanka Podujana Peramuna and crossed over to the opposition as an independent MP. Two days later, Alahapperuma's faction launched a new political party, the Freedom People's Congress.

== Family ==
He is married to popular singer Pradeepa Dharmadasa, daughter of P.K. and Hema Dharmadasa of Galle, and has two children.
