= Jathika Nidahas Peramuna =

National Freedom Front ජාතික නිදහස් පෙරමුණ தேசிய சுதந்திர முன்னணி Jathika Nidhahas Peramuna
- Abbreviation: NFF
- Leader: Wimal Weerawansa
- General Secretary: Sarath Wijesiri
- Founder: Wimal Weerawansa
- Founded: 14 May 2008 (18 years ago)
- Split from: Janatha Vimukthi Peramuna
- Headquarters: 21/1 Asoka Mawatha, Jayanthipura, Battaramulla
- Ideology: Anti-federalism; Sinhalese nationalism
- National affiliation: Former: UPFA; SLPFA; ULS; FPA; SB
- Parliament of Sri Lanka: 0 / 225
- Local Government: 26 / 7,842

Website
- jnpsrilanka.lk

The Jathika Nidahas Peramuna (JNP) or National Freedom Front (NFF) is a political party in Sri Lanka which was formed by ten JVP parliamentarians led by Wimal Weerawansa, as a breakaway group of the Janatha Vimukthi Peramuna (JVP).

The NFF commenced political activities on 14 May 2008. The party is also notable for being the first party in Sri Lanka to launch its own official website.

== History ==
The Janatha Vimukthi Peramuna (JVP), a Marxist–Leninist political party in Sri Lanka, was formed in 1965 by a breakaway group of the Ceylon Communist Party (Maoist) led by Rohana Wijeweera. The JVP was involved in two armed uprisings against the ruling governments in 1971 and between 1987 and 1989. After 1989, the JVP entered electoral politics by participating in the 1994 parliamentary election.

Due to misconduct and various other charges against Wimal Weerawansa, the leadership of the JVP decided to suspend the membership of Wimal Weerawansa and expel him from the party on 21 March 2008. As the media reports, Weerawansa had an argument with the leadership based on the disarmament of the Tamil Makkal Viduthalai Pulikal (TMVP) political party, a breakaway faction of the LTTE which was contesting in the country's Eastern provincial council elections May 2008 under the banner of the ruling United People's Freedom Alliance (UPFA).

JVP MP Piyasiri Wijenayake accused the main opposition party, the United National Party, of conspiring against the JVP, during a media conference held at the Nippon Hotel Colombo on 8 April 2008.

The dissident faction led by Wimal Weerawansa visited the most senior Buddhist monks of the Asgiriya and Malwatte chapters on 20 April 2008, to "obtain blessings for their new political movement". The UNP was again accused of orchestrating a conspiracy to divide and destabilize the JVP, this time by Weerawansa.

The party commenced political activities on 14 May 2008, the same day Rohana Wijeweera formed the JVP in 1965, and also the day of the infamous Anuradhapura massacre carried out by the LTTE, where 146 pilgrims at the Jaya Sri Maha Bodhi in Anuradhapura were brutally murdered by the LTTE. The party leaders who addressed the inaugural ceremony at BMICH Colombo claimed that the new political party would be an alternative party to the two main political parties, the UNP and the SLFP.

In October 2024, Wimal Weerawansa announced that the NFF would not be participating in the upcoming parliamentary elections, in hopes of increasing chances of the JVP-led National People's Power, led by President Anura Kumara Dissanayake, winning a majority in Parliament.

== Electoral history ==
Sri Lanka Parliamentary Elections
Election year	Votes	Vote %	Seats won	+/–	Result for the party
2010	Part of UPFA		3 / 225	Steady	Government
2015	Part of UPFA		5 / 225	▲2	Opposition
2020	Part of SLPFA		6 / 225	▲1	Government (2019–2022)
2020	Part of SLPFA		6 / 225	▲1	Opposition (since 2022)

== Bibliography ==
- Jayadeva, Uyangoda (2008). "The Janatha Vimukthi Peramuna Split". Economic and Political Weekly.

== See also ==
- Weerakumara Dissanayake
