= Wickremesinghe cabinet =

Government of Sri Lanka from 2022 to 2024

Ranil Wickremesinghe cabinet
- Cabinet of Sri Lanka

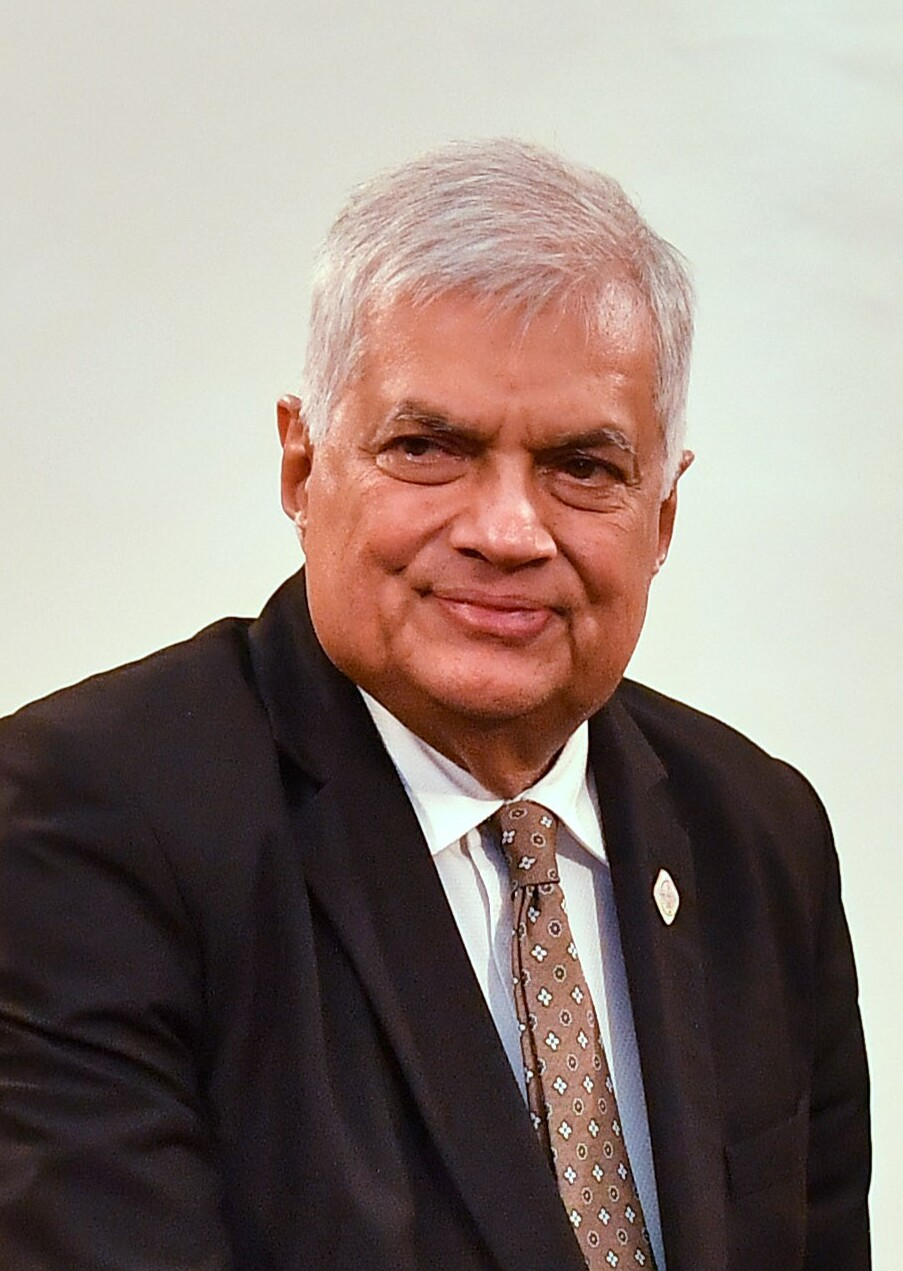
- Date formed: 22 July 2022
- Date dissolved: 24 September 2024

People and organisations
- Head of state: Ranil Wickremesinghe
- Head of government: Ranil Wickremesinghe
- Deputy head of government: Dinesh Gunawardena
- Total no. of members: 22
- Member parties: Sri Lanka Podujana Peramuna; United National Party; Eelam People's Democratic Party; Sri Lanka Freedom Party
- Status in legislature: Minority coalition
- Opposition party: Samagi Jana Balawegaya
- Opposition leader: Sajith Premadasa

History
- Outgoing election: 2024
- Legislature term: 16th
- Predecessor: Gotabaya Rajapaksa IV
- Successor: Dissanayake I

The Wickremesinghe cabinet was the central government of Sri Lanka led by President Ranil Wickremesinghe. It was formed in July 2022, following the resignation of Wickremesinghe's predecessor, Gotabaya Rajapaksa. It ended in September 2024 following Wickremesinghe's defeat at the 2024 Sri Lankan presidential election.

== Cabinet members ==
Ministers appointed under article 43(1) of the constitution. The members of the cabinet is as follows:

Name	Portrait	Party	Office	Took office	Left office	^{Refs.}
Ranil Wickremesinghe		United National Party	President of Sri Lanka	21 July 2022 (Note: Wickremesinghe was acting president from 14 July 2022 to 21 July 2022.)	23 September 2024	
Ranil Wickremesinghe		United National Party	Minister of Finance	25 May 2022 (Note: Continuation of same office held in previous cabinet.)	23 September 2024	
Ranil Wickremesinghe		United National Party	Minister of Defence	21 July 2022	23 September 2024	
Ranil Wickremesinghe		United National Party	Minister of Women, Child Affairs and Social Empowerment	21 July 2022	23 September 2024	
Ranil Wickremesinghe		United National Party	Minister of Technology	21 July 2022	23 September 2024	
Dinesh Gunawardena		Sri Lanka Podujana Peramuna	Prime Minister	22 July 2022	23 September 2024	
Dinesh Gunawardena		Sri Lanka Podujana Peramuna	Minister of Public Administration, Home Affairs, Provincial Councils and Local Government	18 April 2022	23 September 2024	
Prasanna Ranatunga		Sri Lanka Podujana Peramuna	Minister of Urban Development and Housing	22 July 2022	24 September 2024	
Kanchana Wijesekera		Sri Lanka Podujana Peramuna	Minister of Power and Energy	22 July 2022	24 September 2024	
Susil Premajayantha		Sri Lanka Podujana Peramuna	Minister of Education	20 May 2022	24 September 2024	
Keheliya Rambukwella		Sri Lanka Podujana Peramuna	Minister of Health and Water Supply	22 July 2022	23 October 2023	
Keheliya Rambukwella		Sri Lanka Podujana Peramuna	Minister of Environment	23 October 2023	3 February 2024	
Wijeyadasa Rajapakshe		Sri Lanka Freedom Party	Minister of Justice, Prison Affairs and Constitutional Reforms	12 May 2022	28 July 2024	
Harin Fernando		United National Party	Minister of Tourism and Lands	22 July 2022	9 August 2024	
Harin Fernando		United National Party	Minister of Sports and Youth Affairs	27 November 2023	9 August 2024	
Mahinda Amaraweera		Sri Lanka Podujana Peramuna	Minister of Agriculture	22 July 2022	23 October 2023	
Mahinda Amaraweera		Sri Lanka Podujana Peramuna	Minister of Agriculture and Plantation Industries	23 October 2023	24 September 2024	
Mahinda Amaraweera		Sri Lanka Podujana Peramuna	Minister of Wildlife and Forest Conservation	12 May 2022	24 September 2024	
Douglas Devananda		Eelam People's Democratic Party	Minister of Fisheries	12 August 2020	24 September 2024	
Manusha Nanayakkara		United National Party	Minister of Labour and Foreign Employment	22 July 2022	9 August 2024	
Bandula Gunawardena		Sri Lanka Podujana Peramuna	Minister of Transport and Highways	22 July 2022	24 September 2024	
Bandula Gunawardena		Sri Lanka Podujana Peramuna	Minister of Mass Media	23 May 2022	24 September 2024	
Ramesh Pathirana		Sri Lanka Podujana Peramuna	Minister of Plantation Industries	18 April 2022	24 September 2024	
Ramesh Pathirana		Sri Lanka Podujana Peramuna	Minister of Industries	20 May 2022	24 September 2024	
Ramesh Pathirana		Sri Lanka Podujana Peramuna	Minister of Health	23 October 2023	24 September 2024	
Vidura Wickremanayake		Sri Lanka Podujana Peramuna	Minister of Buddhasasana, Religious and Cultural Affairs	20 May 2022	24 September 2024	
Nalin Fernando		Sri Lanka Podujana Peramuna	Minister of Trade, Commerce and Food Security	20 May 2022	24 September 2024	
Tiran Alles		Sri Lanka Podujana Peramuna	Minister of Public Security	20 May 2022	24 September 2024	
Ahamed Nazeer Zainulabdeen		Sri Lanka Muslim Congress	Minister of Environment	18 April 2022	6 October 2023	
Roshan Ranasinghe		Sri Lanka Podujana Peramuna	Minister of Sports and Youth Affairs	23 May 2022	27 November 2023	
Roshan Ranasinghe		Sri Lanka Podujana Peramuna	Minister of Irrigation	23 May 2022	27 November 2023	
Ali Sabry		Sri Lanka Podujana Peramuna	Minister of Foreign Affairs	22 July 2022	24 September 2024	
Nimal Siripala de Silva		Sri Lanka Freedom Party	Minister of Ports, Shipping and Aviation	2 August 2022	24 September 2024	
Pavithra Wanniarachchi		Sri Lanka Podujana Peramuna	Minister of Wildlife and Forest Resources Conservation	19 January 2023	24 September 2024	
Pavithra Wanniarachchi		Sri Lanka Podujana Peramuna	Minister of Irrigation	27 November 2023	24 September 2024	
Jeevan Thondaman		Ceylon Workers' Congress	Minister of Water Supply and Estate Infrastructure Development	19 January 2023	24 September 2024	

== State ministers ==
Ministers appointed under article 44(1) of the constitution.

Name	Portrait	Party	Office	Took office	Left office	^{Refs.}
Ranjith Siyambalapitiya		Sri Lanka Podujana Peramuna	Minister of State for Finance	8 September 2022	24 September 2024	
Jagath Pushpakumara		Sri Lanka Podujana Peramuna	Minister of State for Foreign Employment Promotion	8 September 2022	24 September 2024	
Lasantha Alagiyawanna		Sri Lanka Podujana Peramuna	Minister of State for Transport	8 September 2022	24 September 2024	
Janaka Wakkumbura		Sri Lanka Podujana Peramuna	Minister of State for Provincial Councils and Local Government	8 September 2022	24 September 2024	
Janaka Wakkumbura		Sri Lanka Podujana Peramuna	Minister of State for Environment	20 February 2024	24 September 2024	
Mohan Priyadarshana De Silva		Sri Lanka Podujana Peramuna	Minister of State for Agriculture	8 September 2022	5 September 2024	
Rohana Dissanayake		Sri Lanka Podujana Peramuna	Minister of State for Sports and Youth Affairs	8 September 2022	24 September 2024	
Indika Anuruddha		Sri Lanka Podujana Peramuna	Minister of State for Power and Energy	8 September 2022	5 September 2024	
Lohan Ratwatte		Sri Lanka Podujana Peramuna	Minister of State for Plantation Industries	8 September 2022	24 September 2024	
Lohan Ratwatte		Sri Lanka Podujana Peramuna	Minister of State for Mahaweli Development	29 January 2024	24 September 2024	
Sanath Nishantha^{✝}		Sri Lanka Podujana Peramuna	Minister of State for Water Supply	8 September 2022	25 January 2024	
Dilum Amunugama		Sri Lanka Podujana Peramuna	Minister of State for Investment Promotion	8 September 2022	24 September 2024	
Vijitha Berugoda		Sri Lanka Podujana Peramuna	Minister of State for Piriven Education	8 September 2022	24 September 2024	
Siripala Gamlath		Sri Lanka Podujana Peramuna	Minister of State for Highways	8 September 2022	5 September 2024	
Shantha Bandara		Sri Lanka Podujana Peramuna	Minister of State for Mass Media	8 September 2022	24 September 2024	
Kanaka Herath		Sri Lanka Podujana Peramuna	Minister of State for Technology	8 September 2022	24 September 2024	
Shehan Semasinghe		Sri Lanka Podujana Peramuna	Minister of State for Finance	8 September 2022	24 September 2024	
Thenuka Vidanagamage		Sri Lanka Podujana Peramuna	Minister of State for Economic Development and Housing	8 September 2022	10 September 2024	
Pramitha Bandara Tennakoon		Sri Lanka Podujana Peramuna	Minister of State for Defence	8 September 2022	24 September 2024	
Arundika Fernando		Sri Lanka Podujana Peramuna	Minister of State for Urban Development and Housing	8 September 2022	24 September 2024	
Tharaka Balasuriya		Sri Lanka Podujana Peramuna	Minister of State for Foreign Affairs	8 September 2022	24 September 2024	
Shasheendra Rajapaksa		Sri Lanka Podujana Peramuna	Minister of State for Irrigation	8 September 2022	10 September 2024	
Shasheendra Rajapaksa		Sri Lanka Podujana Peramuna	Minister of State for Water Resources Management	1 February 2024	10 September 2024	
Sathasivam Viyalanderan		Sri Lanka Podujana Peramuna	Minister of State for Trade	8 September 2022	24 September 2024	
Sisira Jayakody		Sri Lanka Podujana Peramuna	Minister of State for Indigenous Medicine	8 September 2022	24 September 2024	
Piyal Nishantha de Silva		Sri Lanka Podujana Peramuna	Minister of State for Fisheries	8 September 2022	24 September 2024	
Prasanna Ranaweera		Sri Lanka Podujana Peramuna	Minister of State for Small and Medium-Scale Enterprise Development	8 September 2022	10 September 2024	
D. B. Herath		Sri Lanka Podujana Peramuna	Minister of State for Livestock Development	8 September 2022	24 September 2024	
Anuradha Jayaratne		Sri Lanka Podujana Peramuna	Minister of State for Justice and Prisons Reforms	8 September 2022	24 September 2024	
Seetha Arambepola		Sri Lanka Podujana Peramuna	Minister of State for Health	8 September 2022	24 September 2024	
D. V. Chanaka		Sri Lanka Podujana Peramuna	Minister of State for Conservation of Wildlife and Forest Reserves	8 September 2022	10 September 2024	
Kader Masthan		Sri Lanka Podujana Peramuna	Minister of State for Rural Economy	8 September 2022	24 September 2024	
Ashoka Priyantha		Sri Lanka Podujana Peramuna	Minister of State for Home Affairs	8 September 2022	24 September 2024	
Aravindh Kumar		Up-Country People's Front	Minister of State for Education	8 September 2022	24 September 2024	
Geetha Kumarasinghe		Sri Lanka Podujana Peramuna	Minister of State for Women and Child Affairs	8 September 2022	10 September 2024	
Sivanesathurai Chandrakanthan		Tamil Makkal Viduthalai Pulikal	Minister of State for Rural Road Development	8 September 2022	24 September 2024	
Suren Raghavan		Sri Lanka Podujana Peramuna	Minister of State for Higher Education	8 September 2022	24 September 2024	
Diana Gamage		Sri Lanka Podujana Peramuna	Minister of State for Tourism	8 September 2022	8 May 2024	
Chamara Sampath Dassanayake		Sri Lanka Podujana Peramuna	Minister of State for Primary Industries	8 September 2022	24 September 2024	
Anupa Pasqual		Sri Lanka Podujana Peramuna	Minister of State for Social Empowerment	8 September 2022	24 September 2024	
Premalal Jayasekara		Sri Lanka Podujana Peramuna	Minister of State for Ports and Aviation	12 September 2022	5 September 2024	

✝ _{Died in office.}
