= Second Gotabaya Rajapaksa cabinet =

Government of Sri Lanka

- Cabinet of Sri Lanka

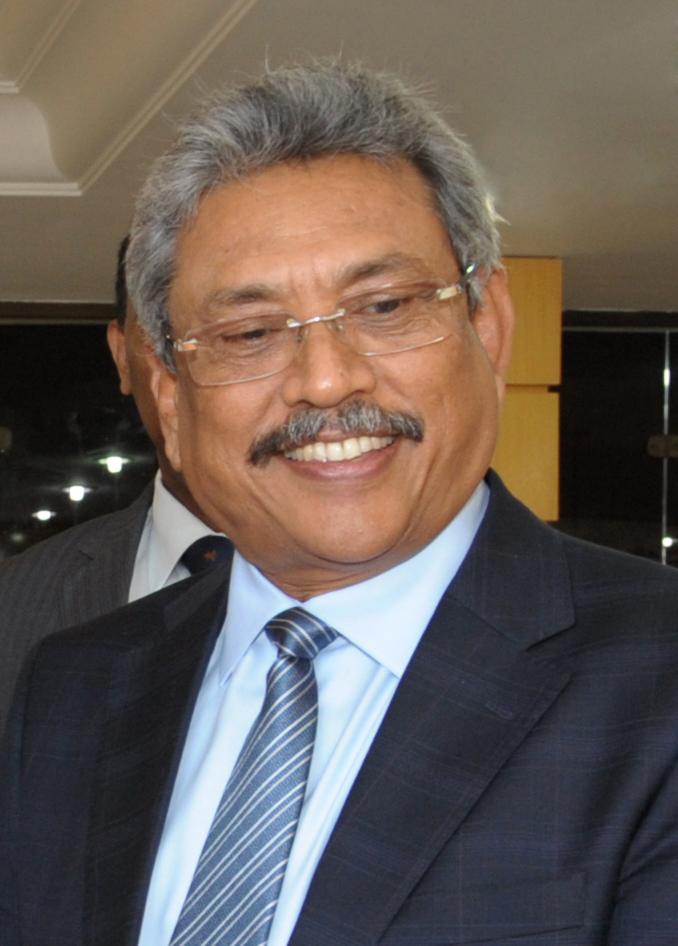
- Date formed: 12 August 2020
- Date dissolved: 3 April 2022

People and organisations
- Head of state: Gotabaya Rajapaksa
- Head of government: Gotabaya Rajapaksa
- Deputy head of government: Mahinda Rajapaksa
- Total no. of members: 69
- Member parties: Sri Lanka People's Freedom Alliance; Eelam People's Democratic Party; Sri Lanka Freedom Party
- Status in legislature: Majority coalition
- Opposition party: Samagi Jana Balawegaya
- Opposition leader: Sajith Premadasa

History
- Election: 2020
- Legislature term: 16th
- Predecessor: Gotabaya Rajapaksa I
- Successor: Gotabaya Rajapaksa III

The second Gotabaya Rajapaksa cabinet was the central government of Sri Lanka led by President Gotabaya Rajapaksa. It was formed in August 2020 after the parliamentary election and ended in April 2022 after all 26 cabinet ministers resigned en masse amidst the 2022 Sri Lankan protests.

== Cabinet members ==
Ministers appointed under article 43(1) of the constitution.

Name	Portrait	Party	Office	Took office	Left office	^{Refs.}
Gotabaya Rajapaksa		Sri Lanka Podujana Peramuna	President	18 November 2019 (Note: Continuation of same office held in previous cabinet.)		
Gotabaya Rajapaksa		Sri Lanka Podujana Peramuna	Minister of Defence (Note: In August 2020 it was reported that President Gotabaya Rajapaksa had assigned the defence portfolio to himself. This violated article 43(2) of the Constitution of Sri Lanka, introduced by the 19th amendment, which allows only Members of Parliament to be in charge of ministries (the president is not a Members of Parliament). The defence portfolio was omitted from the official gazette notifying the cabinet appointments in August 2020. The 20th amendment, passed in October 2020, removed article 43(2).)	26 November 2020		
Gotabaya Rajapaksa		Sri Lanka Podujana Peramuna	Minister of Technology	26 November 2020		
Mahinda Rajapaksa		Sri Lanka Podujana Peramuna	Prime Minister	21 November 2019		
Mahinda Rajapaksa		Sri Lanka Podujana Peramuna	Minister of Buddha Sasana, Religious and Cultural Affairs	12 August 2020		
Mahinda Rajapaksa		Sri Lanka Podujana Peramuna	Minister of Economic Policy and Plan Implementation	8 July 2021		
Mahinda Rajapaksa		Sri Lanka Podujana Peramuna	Minister of Finance	12 August 2020	8 July 2021	
Mahinda Rajapaksa		Sri Lanka Podujana Peramuna	Minister of Urban Development and Housing	12 August 2020		
Rohitha Abeygunawardena		Sri Lanka Podujana Peramuna	Minister of Ports and Shipping	12 August 2020		
Dullas Alahapperuma		Sri Lanka Podujana Peramuna	Minister of Power	12 August 2020		
Mahindananda Aluthgamage		Sri Lanka Podujana Peramuna	Minister of Agriculture	12 August 2020		
Mahinda Amaraweera		Sri Lanka Freedom Party	Minister of Environment	12 August 2020		
S. M. Chandrasena		Sri Lanka Podujana Peramuna	Minister of Lands	12 August 2020		
Nimal Siripala de Silva		Sri Lanka Freedom Party	Minister of Labour	12 August 2020		
Douglas Devananda		Eelam People's Democratic Party	Minister of Fisheries	12 August 2020		
Johnston Fernando		Sri Lanka Podujana Peramuna	Minister of Highways	12 August 2020		
Udaya Gammanpila		Pivithuru Hela Urumaya	Minister of Energy	12 August 2020	3 March 2022	
Bandula Gunawardena		Sri Lanka Podujana Peramuna	Minister of Trade	12 August 2020		
Dinesh Gunawardena		Mahajana Eksath Peramuna	Minister of Foreign Relations	22 November 2019		
Gamini Lokuge		Sri Lanka Podujana Peramuna	Minister of Transport	12 August 2020		
Vasudeva Nanayakkara		Democratic Left Front	Minister of Water Supply	12 August 2020		
Ramesh Pathirana		Sri Lanka Podujana Peramuna	Minister of Plantation	12 August 2020		
G. L. Peiris		Sri Lanka Podujana Peramuna	Minister of Education	12 August 2020		
Basil Rajapaksa		Sri Lanka Podujana Peramuna	Minister of Finance	8 July 2021		
Chamal Rajapaksa		Sri Lanka Podujana Peramuna	Minister of Irrigation	12 August 2020		
Namal Rajapaksa		Sri Lanka Podujana Peramuna	Minister of Youth and Sports	12 August 2020		
Keheliya Rambukwella		Sri Lanka Podujana Peramuna	Minister of Mass Media	12 August 2020		
Prasanna Ranatunga		Sri Lanka Podujana Peramuna	Minister of Tourism	12 August 2020		
C. B. Ratnayake		Sri Lanka Podujana Peramuna	Minister of Wildlife and Forest Conservation	12 August 2020		
Ali Sabry		Sri Lanka Podujana Peramuna	Minister of Justice	12 August 2020		
Janaka Bandara Tennakoon		Sri Lanka Podujana Peramuna	Minister of Public Services, Provincial Councils and Local Government	12 August 2020		
Pavithra Devi Wanniarachchi		Sri Lanka Podujana Peramuna	Minister of Health	12 August 2020		
Sarath Weerasekara		Sri Lanka Podujana Peramuna	Minister of Public Security	26 November 2020		
Wimal Weerawansa		National Freedom Front	Minister of Industries	12 August 2020	3 March 2022	

== State ministers ==
Ministers appointed under article 44(1) of the constitution.

Name	Portrait	Party	Office	Took office	Left office	^{Refs.}
Lasantha Alagiyawanna		Sri Lanka Freedom Party	State Minister of Co-operative Services, Marketing Development and Consumer Protection	12 August 2020		
Dilum Amunugama		Sri Lanka Podujana Peramuna	State Minister of Vehicle Regulation, Bus Transport Services and Train Compartments and Motor Car Industry	12 August 2020		
Indika Anuruddha		Sri Lanka Podujana Peramuna	State Minister of Rural Housing and Construction and Building Material Industries	12 August 2020		
Seetha Arambepola		Sri Lanka Podujana Peramuna	State Minister of Skills Development, Vocational Education, Research and Innovation	12 August 2020		
Tharaka Balasuriya		Sri Lanka Podujana Peramuna	State Minister of Regional Co-operation	12 August 2020		
Vijitha Berugoda		Sri Lanka Podujana Peramuna	State Minister of Dhamma Schools, Bhikku Education, Piriven and Buddhist Universities	12 August 2020	25 September 2020	
Vijitha Berugoda		Sri Lanka Podujana Peramuna	State Minister of Dhamma Schools, Pirivenas and Bhikkhu Education	25 September 2020		
Ajith Nivard Cabraal		Sri Lanka Podujana Peramuna	State Minister of Money and Capital Market and State Enterprise Reforms	12 August 2020		
D. V. Chanaka		Sri Lanka Podujana Peramuna	State Minister of Aviation and Export Zones Development	12 August 2020		
Mohan de Silva		Sri Lanka Podujana Peramuna	State Minister of Production and Supply of Fertilizer and Regulation of Chemical Fertilizer and Insecticide Use	12 August 2020		
Piyal Nishantha de Silva		Sri Lanka Podujana Peramuna	State Minister of Women and Child Development, Pre-Schools and Primary Education, School Infrastructure and School Services	12 August 2020		
Duminda Dissanayake		Sri Lanka Freedom Party	State Minister of Solar Power, Wind and Hydro Power Generation Projects Development	12 August 2020		
Wimalaweera Dissanayake		Sri Lanka Podujana Peramuna	State Minister of Wildlife Protection, Adoption of Safety Measures including the Construction of Electrical Fences and Trenches and Reforeststation and Forest Resource Development	12 August 2020		
Arundika Fernando		Sri Lanka Podujana Peramuna	State Minister of Coconut, Kithul, Palmyrah and Rubber Cultivation Promotion and Related Industrial Product Manufacturing and Export Diversification	12 August 2020	25 September 2020	
Arundika Fernando		Sri Lanka Podujana Peramuna	State Minister of Coconut, Kithul and Palmyrah Cultivation Promotion and Related Industrial Product Manufacturing and Export Diversification	25 September 2020		
Sudarshani Fernandopulle		Sri Lanka Podujana Peramuna	State Minister of Prisons Reforms and Prisoners’ Rehabilitation	12 August 2020	30 November 2020	
Sudarshani Fernandopulle		Sri Lanka Podujana Peramuna	State Minister of Primary Health Care, Epidemics and Covid Disease Control	30 November 2020		
Siripala Gamalath		Sri Lanka Podujana Peramuna	State Minister of Canals and Common Infrastructure Development in Settlements in Mahaweli Zones	12 August 2020		
Nalaka Godahewa		Sri Lanka Podujana Peramuna	State Minister of Urban Development, Coast Conservation, Waste Disposal and Community Cleanliness	12 August 2020		
D. B. Herath		Sri Lanka Podujana Peramuna	State Minister of Livestock, Farm Promotion and Dairy and Egg Related Industries	12 August 2020		
Kanaka Herath		Sri Lanka Podujana Peramuna	State Minister of Company Estate Reforms, Tea Estate Related Crops, Tea Factory Modernization and Tea Export Promotion	12 August 2020	25 September 2020	
Kanaka Herath		Sri Lanka Podujana Peramuna	State Minister of Company Estate Reforms, Tea and Rubber Estates Related Crops Cultivation and Factories Modernization and Tea and Rubber Export Promotion	25 September 2020		
Sisira Jayakody		Sri Lanka Podujana Peramuna	State Minister of Indigenous Medicine Promotion, Rural and Ayurvedic Hospitals Development and Community Health	12 August 2020		
Anuradha Jayaratne		Sri Lanka Podujana Peramuna	State Minister of Tanks, Reservoirs and Irrigation Development Related to Rural Paddy Fields	12 August 2020		
Piyankara Jayaratne		Sri Lanka Podujana Peramuna	State Minister of Foreign Employment Promotions and Market Diversification	12 August 2020		
Dayasiri Jayasekara		Sri Lanka Freedom Party	State Minister of Batik, Handloom and Local Apparel Products	12 August 2020		
Channa Jayasumana		Sri Lanka Podujana Peramuna	State Minister of Production, Supply and Regulation of Pharmaceuticals	12 August 2020		
Nimal Lanza		Sri Lanka Podujana Peramuna	State Minister of Rural Roads and Other Infrastructure	12 August 2020		
Sanath Nishantha		Sri Lanka Podujana Peramuna	State Minister of Rural and Divisional Drinking Water Supply Projects Development	12 August 2020		
Susil Premajayantha		Sri Lanka Podujana Peramuna	State Minister of Education Reforms, Open Universities and Distance Learning Promotion	26 August 2020		
Chamal Rajapaksa		Sri Lanka Podujana Peramuna	State Minister of Internal Security, Home Affairs and Disaster Management	12 August 2020	26 November 2020	
Chamal Rajapaksa		Sri Lanka Podujana Peramuna	State Minister of National Security, Home Affairs and Disaster Management	26 November 2020		
Shasheendra Rajapaksa		Sri Lanka Podujana Peramuna	State Minister of Paddy and Grains, Organic Food, Vegetables, Fruits, Chillies, Onion and Potato Cultivation Promotion, Seed Production and Advanced Technology Agriculture	12 August 2020		
Roshan Ranasinghe		Sri Lanka Podujana Peramuna	State Minister of Land Management, State Enterprises Land and Property Development	12 August 2020		
Prasanna Ranaweera		Sri Lanka Podujana Peramuna	State Minister of Rattan, Brass, Pottery, Furniture and Rural Industrial Promotion	12 August 2020		
Lohan Ratwatte		Sri Lanka Podujana Peramuna	State Minister of Gem and Jewelry Related Industries	12 August 2020		
Lohan Ratwatte		Sri Lanka Podujana Peramuna	State Minister of Prison Management and Prisoners’ Rehabilitation	30 November 2020		
Jayantha Samaraweera		National Freedom Front	State Minister of Warehouse Facilities, Container Yards, Port Supply Facilities and Boats and Shipping Industry Development	12 August 2020		
Shehan Semasinghe		Sri Lanka Podujana Peramuna	State Minister of Samurdhi, Household Economy, Micro Finance, Self Employment, Business Development and Underutilized State Resources Development	12 August 2020	25 September 2020	
Shehan Semasinghe		Sri Lanka Podujana Peramuna	State Minister of Samurdhi, Household Economy, Micro Finance, Self Employment and Business Development	25 September 2020		
Jeevan Thondaman		Ceylon Workers' Congress	State Minister of Estate Housing and Community Infrastructure	12 August 2020		
Thenuka Vidanagamage		Sri Lanka Podujana Peramuna	State Minister of Rural and School Sports Infrastructure Improvement	12 August 2020		
S. Viyalendiran		Sri Lanka Podujana Peramuna	State Minister of Postal Services and Professional Development of Journalists	12 August 2020	6 October 2020	
S. Viyalendiran		Sri Lanka Podujana Peramuna	State Minister of Backward Rural Areas Development and Promotion of Domestic Animal Husbandry and Minor Economic Crop Cultivation	6 October 2020		
Janaka Wakkumbura		Sri Lanka Podujana Peramuna	State Minister of Development of Minor Crops including Sugarcane, Maize, Cashew, Pepper, Cinnamon, Cloves, Betel Related Industries and Export Promotion	12 August 2020		
Sarath Weerasekara		Sri Lanka Podujana Peramuna	State Minister of Provincial Councils and Local Government	12 August 2020	26 November 2020	
Vidura Wickremanayake		Sri Lanka Podujana Peramuna	State Minister of National Heritage, Performing Arts and Rural Arts Promotion	12 August 2020		
Kanchana Wijesekera		Sri Lanka Podujana Peramuna	State Minister of Ornamental Fish, Inland Fish and Prawn Farming, Fishery Harbour Development, Multiday Fishing Activities and Fish Exports	12 August 2020		
