= Third Gotabaya Rajapaksa cabinet =

Government in Sri Lanka

- Cabinet of Sri Lanka

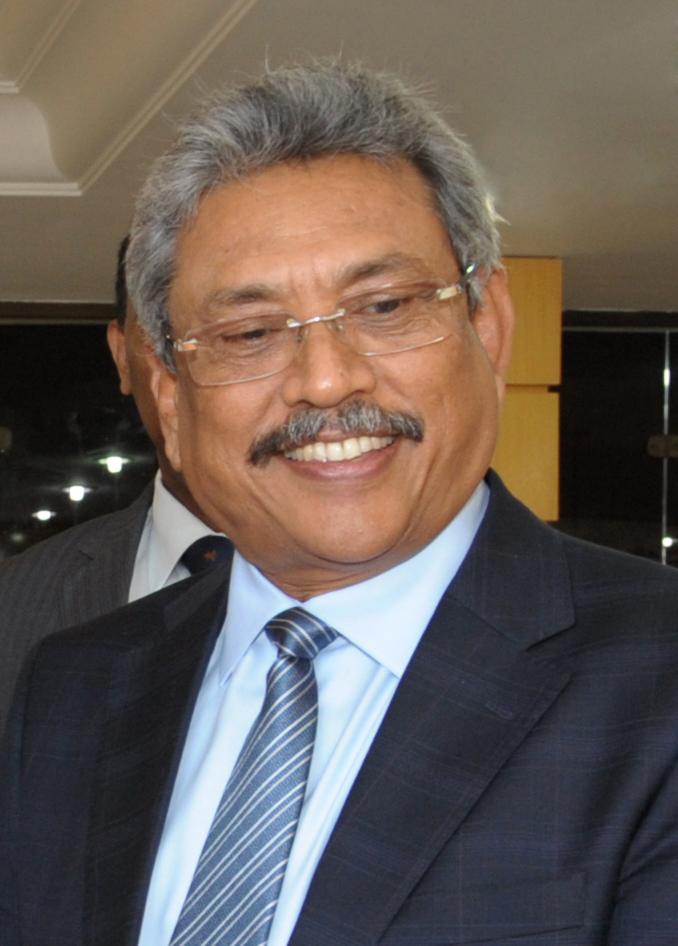
- Date formed: 18 April 2022
- Date dissolved: 9 May 2022

People and organisations
- Head of state: Gotabaya Rajapaksa
- Head of government: Gotabaya Rajapaksa
- Deputy head of government: Mahinda Rajapaksa
- No. of ministers: 21
- Total no. of members: 47
- Member parties: Sri Lanka Podujana Peramuna; Eelam People's Democratic Party
- Status in legislature: Minority government
- Opposition party: Samagi Jana Balawegaya
- Opposition leader: Sajith Premadasa

History
- Legislature term: 16th
- Predecessor: Gotabaya Rajapaksa II
- Successor: Gotabaya Rajapaksa IV

The third Gotabaya Rajapaksa cabinet was the central government of Sri Lanka led by President Gotabaya Rajapaksa. It was formed in April 2022 after the mass resignation of the previous cabinet and ended in May 2022 following the resignation of Prime Minister Mahinda Rajapaksa.

As of 21 April 2022, the cabinet had 19 members – the president, prime minister and 17 ministers. There were also 27 state ministers who were not members of the cabinet. One cabinet minister was also a state minister.

== Cabinet members ==
Ministers appointed under article 43(1) of the constitution. The 19 member cabinet is as follows:

Name	Portrait	Party	Office	Took office	Left office	^{Refs.}
Gotabaya Rajapaksa		Sri Lanka Podujana Peramuna	President	18 November 2019 (Note: Continuation of same office held in previous cabinet.)		
Gotabaya Rajapaksa		Sri Lanka Podujana Peramuna	Minister of Defence (Note: In August 2020 it was reported that President Gotabaya Rajapaksa had assigned the defence portfolio to himself. This violated article 43(2) of the Constitution of Sri Lanka, introduced by the 19th amendment, which allows only Members of Parliament to be in charge of ministries (the president is not a Members of Parliament). The defence portfolio was omitted from the official gazette notifying the cabinet appointments in August 2020. The 20th amendment, passed in October 2020, removed article 43(2).)	26 November 2020		
Gotabaya Rajapaksa		Sri Lanka Podujana Peramuna	Minister of Technology	26 November 2020		
Mahinda Rajapaksa		Sri Lanka Podujana Peramuna	Prime Minister	21 November 2019	9 May 2022	
Mahinda Rajapaksa		Sri Lanka Podujana Peramuna	Minister of Buddha Sasana, Religious and Cultural Affairs	12 August 2020	9 May 2022	
G. L. Peiris		Sri Lanka Podujana Peramuna	Minister of Foreign Affairs	16 August 2021		
Dinesh Gunawardena		Mahajana Eksath Peramuna	Minister of Public Administration, Home Affairs, Provincial Councils and Local Government	18 April 2022		
Prasanna Ranatunga		Sri Lanka Podujana Peramuna	Minister of Public Security and Tourism	18 April 2022	9 May 2022	
Kanchana Wijesekera		Sri Lanka Podujana Peramuna	Minister of Power and Energy	18 April 2022		
Nalaka Godahewa		Sri Lanka Podujana Peramuna	Minister of Mass Media	18 April 2022	9 May 2022	
Channa Jayasumana		Sri Lanka Podujana Peramuna	Minister of Health	18 April 2022	9 May 2022	
Shehan Semasinghe		Sri Lanka Podujana Peramuna	Minister of Trade and Samurdhi Development	18 April 2022	9 May 2022	
Mohan Priyadharshana de Silva		Sri Lanka Podujana Peramuna	Minister of Water Supply	18 April 2022	9 May 2022	
Dilum Amunugama		Sri Lanka Podujana Peramuna	Minister of Transport	18 April 2022	9 May 2022	
Dilum Amunugama		Sri Lanka Podujana Peramuna	Minister of Industries	18 April 2022	9 May 2022	
Douglas Devananda		Eelam People's Democratic Party	Minister of Fisheries	12 August 2020		
Kanaka Herath		Sri Lanka Podujana Peramuna	Minister of Highways	18 April 2022	9 May 2022	
Wimalaweera Dissanayake		Sri Lanka Podujana Peramuna	Minister of Wildlife and Forest Conservation	18 April 2022	9 May 2022	
Ramesh Pathirana		Sri Lanka Podujana Peramuna	Minister of Plantation Industry	18 April 2022		
Ramesh Pathirana		Sri Lanka Podujana Peramuna	Minister of Education	18 April 2022	9 May 2022	
Vidura Wickremanayake		Sri Lanka Podujana Peramuna	Minister of Labour	18 April 2022	9 May 2022	
Janaka Wakkumbura		Sri Lanka Podujana Peramuna	Minister of Agriculture	18 April 2022	9 May 2022	
Janaka Wakkumbura		Sri Lanka Podujana Peramuna	Minister of Irrigation	18 April 2022	9 May 2022	
Thenuka Vidanagamage		Sri Lanka Podujana Peramuna	Minister of Sports and Youth Affairs	18 April 2022	9 May 2022	
Ahamed Nazeer Zainulabdeen		Sri Lanka Muslim Congress	Minister of Environment	18 April 2022		
Ali Sabry		Sri Lanka Podujana Peramuna	Minister of Finance	4 April 2022	9 May 2022	
Ali Sabry		Sri Lanka Podujana Peramuna	Minister of Justice	12 August 2020	9 May 2022	
Pramitha Bandara Tennakoon		Sri Lanka Podujana Peramuna	Minister of Ports and Shipping	18 April 2022	9 May 2022	

== State ministers ==
Ministers appointed under article 44(1) of the constitution.

Name	Portrait	Party	Office	Took office	Left office	^{Refs.}
G. L. Peiris		Sri Lanka Podujana Peramuna	Minister of State for Defence	18 April 2022	9 May 2022	
Rohana Dissanayake		Sri Lanka Podujana Peramuna	Minister of State for Provincial Councils and Local Government	18 April 2022	9 May 2022	
Arundika Fernando		Sri Lanka Podujana Peramuna	Minister of State for Plantation Industries	18 April 2022	9 May 2022	
Tharaka Balasuriya		Sri Lanka Podujana Peramuna	Minister of State for Foreign Affairs	18 April 2022	9 May 2022	
Indika Anuruddha		Sri Lanka Podujana Peramuna	Minister of State for Housing	18 April 2022	9 May 2022	
Sanath Nishantha		Sri Lanka Podujana Peramuna	Minister of State for Water Supply	18 April 2022	9 May 2022	
Siripala Gamalath		Sri Lanka Podujana Peramuna	Minister of State for Mahaweli	18 April 2022	9 May 2022	
Anuradha Jayaratne		Sri Lanka Podujana Peramuna	Minister of State for Irrigation	18 April 2022	9 May 2022	
Sisira Jayakody		Sri Lanka Podujana Peramuna	Minister of State for Indigenous Medicine	18 April 2022	9 May 2022	
Prasanna Ranaweera		Sri Lanka Podujana Peramuna	Minister of State for Industries	18 April 2022	9 May 2022	
D. V. Chanaka		Sri Lanka Podujana Peramuna	Minister of State for Tourism	18 April 2022	9 May 2022	
D. B. Herath		Sri Lanka Podujana Peramuna	Minister of State for Livestock	18 April 2022	9 May 2022	
Kader Masthan		Sri Lanka Podujana Peramuna	Minister of State for Rural Economic Crop Cultivation & Promotion	18 April 2022	9 May 2022	
Ashoka Priyantha		Sri Lanka Podujana Peramuna	Minister of State for Trade	18 April 2022	9 May 2022	
A. Aravind Kumar		Samagi Jana Balawegaya	Minister of State for Estate Housing and Community Infrastructure	18 April 2022	9 May 2022	
Geetha Kumarasinghe		Sri Lanka Podujana Peramuna	Minister of State for Culture and Performing Arts	18 April 2022	9 May 2022	
Gunapala Ratnasekara		Sri Lanka Podujana Peramuna	Minister of State for Co-operative Services, Marketing Development and Consumer Protection	18 April 2022	9 May 2022	
Kapila Athukorala		Sri Lanka Podujana Peramuna	Minister of State for Minor Export Crop Development	18 April 2022	9 May 2022	
Gayashan Nawananda		Sri Lanka Podujana Peramuna	Minister of State for Health	18 April 2022	9 May 2022	
Diana Gamage		Sri Lanka Podujana Peramuna	Minister of State for Transport	20 April 2022	9 May 2022	
Seetha Arambepola		Sri Lanka Podujana Peramuna	Minister of State for Education and Technology	20 April 2022	9 May 2022	
Vijitha Berugoda		Sri Lanka Podujana Peramuna	Minister of State for Ports and Shipping	20 April 2022	9 May 2022	
Sivanesathurai Chandrakanthan		Tamil Makkal Viduthalai Pulikal	Minister of State for Rural Road Development	20 April 2022	9 May 2022	
Suren Raghavan		Sri Lanka Podujana Peramuna	Minister of State for Education Services and Reform	18 April 2022	20 April 2022	
Suren Raghavan		Sri Lanka Podujana Peramuna	Minister of State for Higher Education	20 April 2022	9 May 2022	
Mohamed Muszhaaraff		All Ceylon Makkal Congress	Minister of State for Textile Industries and Local Apparel Products Promotion	20 April 2022	9 May 2022	
Sathasivam Viyalendiran		Sri Lanka Podujana Peramuna	Minister of State for Youth and Sports	20 April 2022	9 May 2022	
