= Fourth Gotabaya Rajapaksa cabinet =

- Cabinet of Sri Lanka

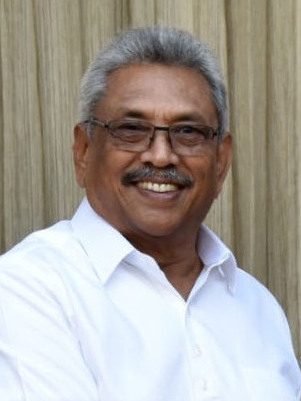
- Date formed: 12 May 2022
- Date dissolved: 14 July 2022

People and organisations
- Head of state: Gotabaya Rajapaksa
- Head of government: Gotabaya Rajapaksa
- Deputy head of government: Ranil Wickremesinghe
- Total no. of members: 22
- Member parties: Sri Lanka Podujana Peramuna; United National Party; Eelam People's Democratic Party
- Status in legislature: Minority
- Opposition party: Samagi Jana Balawegaya
- Opposition leader: Sajith Premadasa

History
- Legislature term: 16th
- Predecessor: Gotabaya Rajapaksa III
- Successor: Wickremesinghe

The fourth Gotabaya Rajapaksa cabinet, also known as the Rajapaksa–Wickremesinghe cabinet, was the central government of Sri Lanka led by President Gotabaya Rajapaksa. It was formed in May 2022 following the appointment of Ranil Wickremesinghe as the new Prime Minister and ended in July 2022 following Rajapaksa's resignation.

This was the sixth time Wickremesinghe was sworn in as Prime Minister of Sri Lanka, a world record.

== Cabinet members ==
Ministers appointed under article 43(1) of the constitution. The members cabinet is as follows:

Name	Portrait	Party	Office	Took office	Left office	^{Refs.}
Gotabaya Rajapaksa		Sri Lanka Podujana Peramuna	President	18 November 2019 (Note: Continuation of same office held in previous cabinet.)	14 July 2022	
Gotabaya Rajapaksa		Sri Lanka Podujana Peramuna	Minister of Defence (Note: In August 2020 it was reported that President Gotabaya Rajapaksa had assigned the defence portfolio to himself. This violated article 43(2) of the Constitution of Sri Lanka, introduced by the 19th amendment, which allows only Members of Parliament to be in charge of ministries (the president is not a Members of Parliament). The defence portfolio was omitted from the official gazette notifying the cabinet appointments in August 2020. The 20th amendment, passed in October 2020, removed article 43(2).)	26 November 2020	14 July 2022	
Gotabaya Rajapaksa		Sri Lanka Podujana Peramuna	Minister of Technology	26 November 2020	14 July 2022	
Ranil Wickramasinghe		United National Party	Prime Minister	12 May 2022		
Ranil Wickramasinghe		United National Party	Minister of Finance, Economic Stabilization and National Policies	25 May 2022		
G. L. Peiris		Sri Lanka Podujana Peramuna	Minister of Foreign Affairs	14 May 2022		
Dinesh Gunawardena		Mahajana Eksath Peramuna	Minister of Public Administration, Home Affairs, Provincial Councils and Local Government	18 April 2022		
Prasanna Ranatunga		Sri Lanka Podujana Peramuna	Minister of Urban Development and Housing	14 May 2022	6 June 2022	
Kanchana Wijesekera		Sri Lanka Podujana Peramuna	Minister of Power and Energy	18 April 2022		
Nimal Siripala de Silva		Sri Lanka Freedom Party	Minister of Ports, Shipping and Aviation	20 May 2022	7 July 2022	
Susil Premajayantha		Sri Lanka Podujana Peramuna	Minister of Education	20 May 2022		
Keheliya Rambukwella		Sri Lanka Podujana Peramuna	Minister of Health	23 May 2022		
Wijeyadasa Rajapakshe		Sri Lanka Podujana Peramuna	Minister of Justice, Prison Affairs and Constitutional Reforms	12 May 2022		
Harin Fernando		Samagi Jana Balawegaya	Minister of Tourism and Lands	20 May 2022	9 July 2022	
Mahinda Amaraweera		Sri Lanka Podujana Peramuna	Minister of Agriculture	12 May 2022		
Mahinda Amaraweera		Sri Lanka Podujana Peramuna	Minister of Wildlife and Forest Conservation	12 May 2022		
Douglas Devananda		Eelam People's Democratic Party	Minister of Fisheries	12 August 2020		
Manusha Nanayakkara		Samagi Jana Balawegaya	Minister of Labour and Foreign Employment	20 May 2022	9 July 2022	
Bandula Gunawardena		Sri Lanka Podujana Peramuna	Minister of Transport and Highways			
Bandula Gunawardena		Sri Lanka Podujana Peramuna	Minister of Mass Media	23 May 2022		
Ramesh Pathirana		Sri Lanka Podujana Peramuna	Minister of Plantation Industry	18 April 2022		
Ramesh Pathirana		Sri Lanka Podujana Peramuna	Minister of Industries	20 May 2022		
Vidura Wickremanayake		Sri Lanka Podujana Peramuna	Minister of Buddhasasana, Religious and Cultural Affairs	20 May 2022		
Nalin Fernando		Sri Lanka Podujana Peramuna	Minister of Trade, Commerce and Food Security	20 May 2022		
Tiran Alles		United People's Party	Minister of Public Security	20 May 2022		
Ahamed Nazeer Zainulabdeen		Sri Lanka Muslim Congress	Minister of Environment	18 April 2022		
Roshan Ranasinghe		Sri Lanka Podujana Peramuna	Minister of Sports and Youth Affairs	23 May 2022		
Roshan Ranasinghe		Sri Lanka Podujana Peramuna	Minister of Irrigation	23 May 2022		
Dhammika Perera		Sri Lanka Podujana Peramuna	Minister of Investment Promotion	24 June 2022	10 July 2022	

== State ministers ==
Ministers appointed under article 44(1) of the constitution.
