= Gotabaya Rajapaksa cabinet =

Gotabaya Rajapaksa cabinet may refer to:

- First Gotabaya Rajapaksa cabinet
- Second Gotabaya Rajapaksa cabinet
- Third Gotabaya Rajapaksa cabinet
- Fourth Gotabaya Rajapaksa cabinet
