= First Sirimavo Bandaranaike cabinet =

- 7th Cabinet of Ceylon

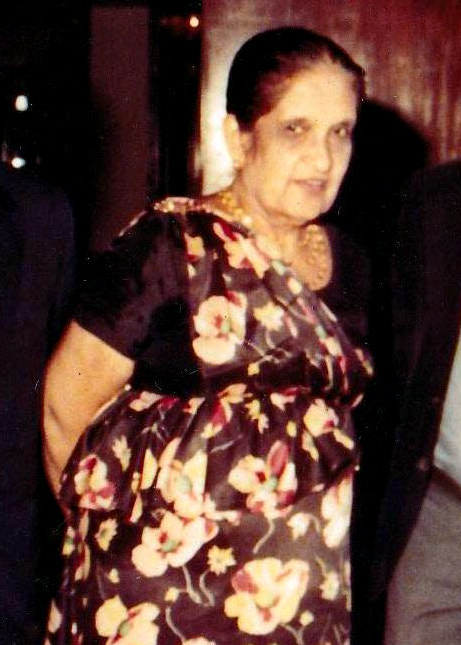
- Date formed: 21 July 1960
- Date dissolved: 25 March 1965

People and organisations
- Monarch: Elizabeth II
- Prime Minister: Sirimavo Bandaranaike
- Member parties: Sri Lanka Freedom Party; Lanka Sama Samaja Party (1964–65)
- Status in legislature: Minority government (1960–64); Majority coalition (1964)
- Opposition party: United National Party
- Opposition leader: Dudley Senanayake

History
- Election: July 1960
- Outgoing election: 1965
- Legislature term: 5th
- Predecessor: Dudley Senanayake II
- Successor: Dudley Senanayake III

The First Sirimavo Bandaranaike cabinet was the central government of Ceylon led by Prime Minister Sirimavo Bandaranaike between 1960 and 1965. It was formed in July 1960 after the parliamentary election and it ended in March 1965 after the opposition's victory in the parliamentary election.

== Cabinet members ==
Name	Portrait	Party	Office	Took office	Left office	Refs
Sirimavo Bandaranaike		Sri Lanka Freedom Party	Prime Minister	21 July 1960	25 March 1965	
Sirimavo Bandaranaike		Sri Lanka Freedom Party	Minister of Defence and External Affairs	23 July 1960		
Felix Dias Bandaranaike		Sri Lanka Freedom Party	Minister of Finance	23 July 1960	27 August 1962	
Felix Dias Bandaranaike		Sri Lanka Freedom Party	Minister of Agriculture, Food and Co-operative Development	28 May 1963		
C. P. de Silva		Sri Lanka Freedom Party	Minister of Agriculture, Land, Irrigation and Power	23 July 1960		
C. P. de Silva		Sri Lanka Freedom Party	Minister of Finance	28 August 1962	5 November 1962	
Senator Sam P. C. Fernando			Minister of Justice	23 July 1960		
D. S. Goonesekera		Sri Lanka Freedom Party	Minister of Labour and Social Services	28 May 1963		
Cholomondeley Goonewardene		Lanka Sama Samaja Party	Minister of Public Works	11 June 1964		
T. B. Ilangaratne		Sri Lanka Freedom Party	Minister of Commerce, Trade, Food and Shipping	23 July 1960		
T. B. Ilangaratne		Sri Lanka Freedom Party	Minister of Finance	29 May 1963	10 June 1964	
T. B. Ilangaratne		Sri Lanka Freedom Party	Minister of Internal and External Trade	11 June 1964		
Senator A. P. Jayasuriya			Minister of Health	23 July 1960		
P. B. G. Kalugalla		Sri Lanka Freedom Party	Minister of Transport and Works	23 July 1960		
P. B. G. Kalugalla		Sri Lanka Freedom Party	Minister of Finance	9 November 1962	10 May 1963	
P. B. G. Kalugalla		Sri Lanka Freedom Party	Minister of Education and Cultural Affairs	28 May 1963		
Badi-ud-din Mahmud			Minister of Education and Broadcasting	23 July 1960		
Badi-ud-din Mahmud			Minister of Health and Housing	28 May 1963		
Anil Moonesinghe		Lanka Sama Samaja Party	Minister of Communications	11 June 1964		
N. M. Perera		Lanka Sama Samaja Party	Minister of Finance	11 June 1964	17 December 1964	
Mahanama Samaraweera		Sri Lanka Freedom Party	Minister of Local Government and Housing	23 July 1960		
Mahanama Samaraweera		Sri Lanka Freedom Party	Minister of Communications	28 May 1963		
Maithripala Senanayake		Sri Lanka Freedom Party	Minister of Industries, Home and Cultural Affairs	23 July 1960		
Maithripala Senanayake		Sri Lanka Freedom Party	Minister of Commerce and Trade	28 May 1963		
Maithripala Senanayake		Sri Lanka Freedom Party	Minister of Rural and Industrial Development	11 June 1964		
Senator M. P. de Z. Sriwardene			Minister of Labour and Nationalised Services			
Senator M. P. de Z. Sriwardene			Minister of Public Works and Post	28 May 1963		
Senator Sarath Wijesinghe			Minister of Labour and Nationalised Services	23 July 1960		

== Parliamentary secretaries ==
Name	Portrait	Party	Office	Took office	Left office	Refs
Felix Dias Bandaranaike		Sri Lanka Freedom Party	Parliamentary Secretary to the Minister of Defence and External Affairs			
James Peter Obeyesekere III			Parliamentary Secretary to the Minister of Finance	22 June 1964	17 December 1964	
Senator R. S. V. Poulier			Parliamentary Secretary to the Minister of Finance	28 August 1962	6 May 1963	
George Rajapaksa		Sri Lanka Freedom Party	Parliamentary Secretary to the Minister of Finance	29 July 1960	20 June 1962	
Mudiyanse Tennakoon			Parliamentary Secretary to the Minister of Finance	30 May 1963	28 September 1964	
S. K. K. Suriarachchi		Sri Lanka Freedom Party	Parliamentary Secretary to the Minister of Finance	September 1964	25 March 1965	
Vivienne Goonewardene		Lanka Sama Samaja Party	Parliamentary Secretary to the Minister of Local Government	September 1964	25 March 1965	
