= Ministry of Trade, Commerce and Food Security =

Government ministry of Sri Lanka

Ministry of Trade, Commerce, Food security and Co-operative Development
- වෙළඳ, වාණිජ, ආහාර සුරක්ෂිතතාව සහ සමුපකාර සංවර්ධන අමාත්‍යාංශය வர்த்தகம், வணிகம், உணவுப் பாதுகாப்பு மற்றும் கூட்டுறவு மேம்பாட்டு அமைச்சகம்

Ministry overview
- Jurisdiction: Government of Sri Lanka
- Annual budget: Rs 2.315 Billion
- Minister responsible: Wasantha Samarasinghe, Minister of Trade, Commerce and Food Security and Co-operative Development
- Deputy Ministers responsible: Mr. R.M.Jayawardana; Mr. Upali Samarasingha
- Website: www.trade.gov.lk

The Ministry of Trade, Commerce, Food security and Co-operative Development (Sinhala: වෙළඳ, වාණිජ, ආහාර සුරක්ෂිතතා සහ සමූපකාර සංවර්ධන අමාත්‍යාංශය; Tamil: வர்த்தக, வாணிப, உணவுப் பாதுகாப்பு மற்றும் கூட்டுறவு அபிவிருத்தி அமைச்சு) is the Sri Lankan government ministry responsible for "Promotion of competitive and fair trade in the market while securing the interests of local manufacturer and consumer, promotion of co-operative services and contribution to the development of human resources in order to create a knowledge based economy."

== List of ministers ==
The Minister of Trade, Commerce and Food Security and Co-operative Development is an appointment in the Cabinet of Sri Lanka.

Parties

Sri Lanka Freedom Party United National Party Sri Lanka Podujana Peramuna National People's Power

Name	Portrait	Party	Tenure	Designation
A. Ratnayake		United National Party	1947-1952	Minister of Food and Cooperative Undertakings
Felix Dias Bandaranaike		Sri Lanka Freedom Party	1963-1965	Minister of Agriculture, Food and Co-operative Development
S. K. K. Suriarachchi		Sri Lanka Freedom Party	1970-1977	Minister of Food, Co-operatives and Small Industries
Wijeyananda Dahanayake		United National Party	1986-1988	Minister of Co-operatives
Lalith Athulathmudali		United National Party	18 February 1989 - 28 March 1990	Minister of Agriculture, Food and Co-operatives
Johnston Fernando		Sri Lanka Freedom Party	23 April 2010 - 9 January 2015	Ministry of Co-operatives and Internal Trade
Mangala Samaraweera		United National Party	9 January 2015 - 9 November 2018	Minister of Labour and Trade Union Relations
Johnston Fernando		Sri Lanka Freedom Party	9 November 2018 - 11 January 2019	Minister of Trade, Consumer Affairs, Co-operative Development and Christian Religious Affairs
Daya Gamage		United National Party	11 January 2019 - 22 November 2019	Minister of Labour, Trade Union Relations and Social Empowerment
Chamal Rajapaksa		Sri Lanka Podujana Peramuna	22 November 2019 - 12 August 2020	Minister of Trade, Commerce and Food Security
Bandula Gunawardena		Sri Lanka Podujana Peramuna	12 August 2020 - 18 April 2022	Minister of Trade, Commerce and Food Security
Shehan Semasinghe		Sri Lanka Podujana Peramuna	18 April 2022 - 9 May 2022	Minister of Trade, Commerce and Food Security
Nalin Fernando		Sri Lanka Podujana Peramuna	9 May 2022 - 24 September 2024	Minister of Trade, Commerce and Food Security
Harini Amarasuriya		National People's Power	24 September 2024 - 18 November 2024	Ministry of Co-operatives and Internal Trade
Wasantha Samarasinghe		National People's Power	18 November 2024 - Present	Ministry of Co-operatives and Internal Trade

== See also ==
- Ministries of Sri Lanka
