= Ranjith Siyambalapitiya =

Sri Lankan politician (born 1961)

- රංජිත් සියඹලාපිටිය ரஞ்சித் சியம்பலாபிட்டிய
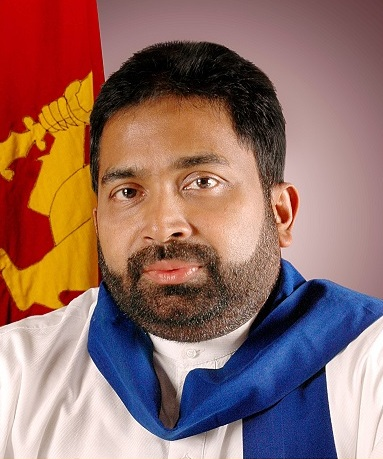

Minister of State for Finance
- In office 8 September 2022 – 24 September 2024 Serving with Shehan Semasinghe
- President: Ranil Wickremesinghe
- Prime Minister: Dinesh Gunawardena

Deputy Speaker of the Parliament of Sri Lanka
- In office 20 August 2020 – 6 May 2022
- Preceded by: Ananda Kumarasiri
- Succeeded by: Ajith Rajapakse

Minister of State for Education Services
- In office 27 November 2019 – 12 August 2020
- President: Gotabaya Rajapaksa
- Prime Minister: Mahinda Rajapaksa

Minister of Power and Renewable Energy
- In office 4 September 2015 – 26 October 2018
- President: Maithripala Sirisena
- Prime Minister: Ranil Wickremesinghe

Minister of Disaster Management
- In office 4 September 2015 – 26 October 2018
- President: Maithripala Sirisena
- Prime Minister: Ranil Wickremesinghe

Minister of State for Environment
- In office 29 May 2015 – 17 August 2015
- President: Maithripala Sirisena
- Prime Minister: Ranil Wickremesinghe

Minister of Telecommunications and Information Technology
- In office 29 May 2015 – 17 August 2015
- President: Maithripala Sirisena
- Prime Minister: Ranil Wickremesinghe

Deputy Minister of Economic Development
- In office 23 April 2010 – 22 November 2010
- President: Mahinda Rajapaksa
- Prime Minister: D. M. Jayaratne

Deputy Minister of Higher Education
- In office 23 November 2005 – 23 April 2010
- President: Mahinda Rajapaksa
- Prime Minister: Ratnasiri Wickremanayake
- Succeeded by: Nandimithra Ekanayake

Deputy Minister of Finance
- In office 10 April 2004 – 23 April 2010
- President: Chandrika Kumaratunga; Mahinda Rajapaksa
- Prime Minister: Mahinda Rajapaksa; Ratnasiri Wickremanayake

Member of Parliament for Kegalle District
- In office 2000–2024

Personal details
- Born: 1 May 1961 (age 65)
- Party: Sri Lanka Freedom Party
- Spouse: Achala Siyambalapitiya
- Children: Shasha Siyabalapitiya; Shamee Siyambalapitiya
- Education: Royal College, Colombo
- Profession: Politician
- Website: Parliament of Sri Lanka

Basnayaka Ralalage Ranjith Siyambalapitiya (born 1 May 1961) (known as Ranjith Siyambalapitiya) is a Sri Lankan politician. He served as Minister of State for Finance, serving with Shehan Semasinghe since 8 September 2022 until the newly elected president Anura Kumara Dissanayake dissolved the parliament on September 24, 2024. He was the Deputy Speaker and Chairman of Committees of the Parliament of Sri Lanka. He is a member of parliament for the Kegalle District. He had served as the former Cabinet Minister of Telecommunication and Information Technology.

== Early life and education ==
Born to Basnayaka Ralalage Cyril Siyambalapitiya of Kegalle and Rajakumara Atapattu Mudiyanselage Kusumawathi of Wendala, Ruwanwella, he had his education at Ruwanwella Primary School and then at Royal College Colombo. In 1981 he entered to the University of Sri Jayawardanapura and graduated with a Bachelor of Business Administration in 1985.
