= Bandula Gunawardane =

Sri Lankan politician

Hon. Bandula Gunawardana
- බන්දුල ගුණවර්ධන பந்துல குணவர்தனே
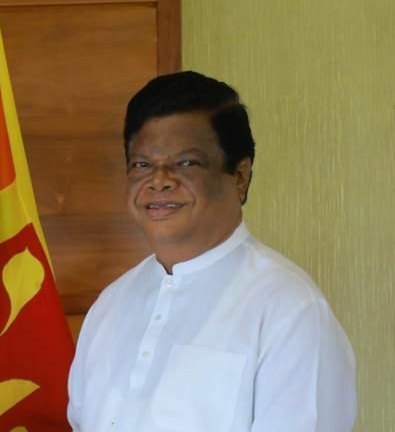

Minister of Transport and Highways
- In office 23 May 2022 – 23 September 2024
- President: Gotabaya Rajapaksa; Ranil Wickremesinghe
- Prime Minister: Ranil Wickremesinghe; Dinesh Gunawardena
- Preceded by: Dilum Amunugama (Note: As Minister of Transport and Industries); Kanaka Herath (Note: As Minister of Highways)
- Succeeded by: Vijitha Herath

Minister of Mass Media
- In office 23 May 2022 – 23 September 2024
- President: Gotabaya Rajapaksa; Ranil Wickremesinghe
- Prime Minister: Ranil Wickremesinghe; Dinesh Gunawardena
- Preceded by: Nalaka Godahewa
- Succeeded by: Vijitha Herath
- In office 17 January 2020 – 12 August 2020
- President: Gotabaya Rajapaksa
- Prime Minister: Mahinda Rajapaksa
- Preceded by: Mangala Samaraweera
- Succeeded by: Keheliya Rambukwella

Minister of Trade
- In office 12 August 2020 – 18 April 2022
- President: Gotabaya Rajapaksa
- Prime Minister: Mahinda Rajapaksa
- Preceded by: Dullas Alahapperuma
- Succeeded by: Shehan Semasinghe
- In office 28 January 2007 – 23 April 2010
- President: Mahinda Rajapaksa
- Prime Minister: Ratnasiri Wickremanayake
- Preceded by: Jeyaraj Fernandopulle

Minister of Higher Education, Technology and Innovation
- In office 22 November 2019 – 12 August 2020
- President: Gotabaya Rajapaksa
- Prime Minister: Mahinda Rajapaksa
- Preceded by: Rauff Hakeem
- Succeeded by: Gotabaya Rajapaksa

Minister of Information and Communication Technology
- In office 22 November 2019 – 17 January 2020
- President: Gotabaya Rajapaksa
- Prime Minister: Mahinda Rajapaksa

Minister of Education
- In office 23 April 2010 – 12 January 2015
- President: Mahinda Rajapaksa
- Prime Minister: D. M. Jayaratne

Minister of Rural Economy
- In office 12 December 2001 – 2 April 2004
- President: Chandrika Kumaratunga
- Prime Minister: Ranil Wickremesinghe

Deputy Minister of Finance
- In office 2001–2004
- President: Chandrika Kumaratunga
- Prime Minister: Ranil Wickremesinghe

Member of Parliament for Colombo District
- In office 2000 – 24 September 2024
- In office 1989–1994

Personal details
- Born: March 15, 1953 (age 73)
- Party: Sri Lanka Freedom Party (2007 - Present); United National Party (2001- 2007); Mahajana Eksath Peramuna (1989 - 2001)
- Other political affiliations: Sri Lanka People's Freedom Alliance (2019 - Present); United People's Freedom Alliance (2007 - 2019); United National Front (2001- 2007); People's Alliance (Sri Lanka) (2000 - 2001)

Sumithra Arachchige Don Bandula Chandrasiri Gunawardane (born 15 March 1953) is a Sri Lankan politician, teacher, and film producer, who was a member of the Parliament of Sri Lanka for Colombo District, and a former government minister.

== Early life ==
He was born in Mabula village, in Avisasalwella Electorate, Colombo District, Sri Lanka. His primary education was at Roman Catholic School in Mabula and for secondary education he entered Rajasinghe Central College. He entered Lumbini College for his Advanced Level studies and entered University of Sri Jayewardenepura after passing A/Ls in commerce stream.

== Career ==
He was a tutor in the city which he started as a hobby while he was still in the university. He successfully contested the 1989 parliamentary election as a candidate for the Mahajana Eksath Peramuna party, and entered parliament. He was defeated in the subsequent 1994 parliamentary election.

Gunawardena was the producer of the film, Suddilage Kathaawa, which won Sarasaviya Awards.

== Personal life ==
He is married and has four children: a son, Sahan, and three daughters. In 2021, his daughter Randula was appointed Third Secretary to the Sri Lankan Permanent Mission to the United Nations in New York.

== See also ==
- Cabinet of Sri Lanka
