= Manusha Nanayakkara =

Sri Lankan politician

Hon. Manusha Nanayakkara
- මනුෂ නානායක්කාර மனுஷ நாணயக்கார
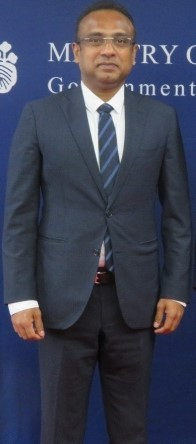
- Manusha Nanayakkara in 2025

Minister of Labour and Foreign Employment
- In office 20 May 2022 – 09 August 2024
- President: Gotabaya Rajapaksa; Ranil Wickremesinghe
- Prime Minister: Ranil Wickremesinghe; Dinesh Gunawardena
- Preceded by: Vidura Wickremanayake

Member of Parliament for Galle District
- In office 2010–2024

Personal details
- Born: September 24, 1977 (age 49) Sri Lanka
- Party: United National Party (2023–present); Samagi Jana Balawegaya (2020–2023); Sri Lanka Freedom Party (2010–2020); United National Party (until 2010)
- Other political affiliations: United People's Freedom Alliance (2010–2020); United National Front (until 2010)
- Spouse: Shanika Sooriyaarachchi
- Children: Menasha nanayakkara
- Education: Mahinda College, Galle
- Occupation: Journalist

Manusha Nanayakkara (born 24 September 1977) is a Sri Lankan politician, Cabinet Minister, and member of Parliament for the Galle District. He is a journalist by profession and was educated at Mahinda College, Galle. He was appointed as the Minister of Labour and Foreign Employment on the 20 May 2022.

On 20 May 2022, amidst the 2022 Sri Lankan protests and political crisis, Nanayakkara was sworn in as the Minister of Labour and Foreign Employment and officially became a member of the Rajapaksa-Wickremesinghe led cabinet, against the wishes of his own party, the Samagi Jana Balawegaya (SJB). He and fellow minister Harin Fernando had subsequently been suspended from the SJB. Both ministers would later resign from their ministerial portfolios on 9 July 2022, but would again be reappointed to their same positions by President Ranil Wickremesinghe on 22 July 2022. A year later, on 18 July 2023, the Working Committee of the SJB expelled Manusha Nanayakkara and Harin Fernando from the party. Shortly afterwards, on 2 August 2023, Fernando and Nanayakkara were readmitted into the United National Party by the party's working committee.

On 9 August 2024, the Supreme Court of Sri Lanka ruled that the decision by the Samagi Jana Balawegaya to expel Manusha Nanayakkara and Harin Fernando from the party was legally valid. As a consequence of this judgement, their expulsion resulted in the loss of their parliamentary seats and ministerial portfolios.

On 20 August 2024, it was announced that Manusha Nanayakkara had been appointed by the President of Sri Lanka, Ranil Wickremesinghe, as the Advisor to the President on Labour and Foreign Employment, with immediate effect.
