= A. Aravind Kumar =

Sri Lankan trade unionist and politician

Hon. A. Aravind Kumar MP MPC
- அரவிந்தகுமார் අරවින්ද කුමාර්

Member of Parliament for Badulla District
- Incumbent
- Assumed office 2015

Member of the Uva Provincial Council for Badulla District
- In office 2004–2014

Personal details
- Born: 17 November 1954 (age 71)
- Party: Up-Country People's Front
- Other political affiliations: Tamil Progressive Alliance
- Occupation: Trade unionist
- Ethnicity: Indian Tamil
- Website: http://www.aravindfoundation.com/

Arunchalam Aravind Kumar (Tamil: அருணாசலம் அரவிந்தகுமார்; born 17 November 1954) is a Sri Lankan trade unionist, politician and Member of Parliament.

== Early life ==
Aravind Kumar was born on 17 November 1954. He was educated at St. Joseph's College, Gampola and St. Anthony's College, Katugastota.

== Career ==
Aravind Kumar is a member of the Up-Country People's Front (UCPF) and served as its finance secretary. He was elected one of the vice-presidents of the Tamil Progressive Alliance in June 2015.

Aravind Kumar contested the 2004 provincial council election as one of the UCPF's candidates in Badulla District and was elected to the Uva Provincial Council (UPC). He was re-elected at the 2009 provincial council election.

Aravind Kumar contested the 2010 parliamentary election as one of the UCPF's candidates in Badulla District but the UCPF failed to win any seats in Parliament. He was one of the United National Front for Good Governance's candidates in Badulla District at the 2015 parliamentary election. He was elected and entered Parliament.

== Electoral history ==
Electoral history of A. Aravind Kumar
| Election | Constituency | Party | Alliance | Votes | Result |
|---|---|---|---|---|---|
| 2004 provincial | Badulla District | UCPF | | 5,059 | Elected |
| 2009 provincial | Badulla District | UCPF | | 7,863 | Elected |
| 2010 parliamentary | Badulla District | UCPF | | | Not elected |
| 2015 parliamentary | Badulla District | UCPF | UNFGG | 53,741 | Elected |
| 2020 parliamentary | Badulla District | UCPF | SJB | 45,491 | Elected |
