= Vidura Wickremanayake =

Sri Lankan politician (born 1959)

Hon. Vidura Wickremanayake
- විදුර වික්‍රමනායක விதுர விக்கிரமநாயக்க

Minister of Buddhashasana, Religious, and Cultural Affairs
- In office 20 May 2022 – 24 September 2024
- President: Gotabaya Rajapaksa; Ranil Wickremesinghe
- Prime Minister: Ranil Wickremesinghe; Dinesh Gunawardena
- Preceded by: Mahinda Rajapaksa
- Succeeded by: Vijitha Herath

Minister of Labour
- In office 18 April 2022 – 9 May 2022
- President: Gotabaya Rajapaksa
- Prime Minister: Mahinda Rajapaksa
- Preceded by: Nimal Siripala de Silva
- Succeeded by: Manusha Nanayakkara

Member of Parliament for Kalutara District
- In office 2010 – 24 September 2024

Personal details
- Born: 11 July 1959 (age 66)
- Party: Sri Lanka Freedom Party
- Other political affiliations: Sri Lanka Podujana Peramuna
- Relations: Ratnasiri Wickremanayake (father)

Vidura Wickremanayake (born 11 July 1959) is a Sri Lankan politician who served as the Minister of Buddhashasana, Religious, and Cultural Affairs from 2022 to 2024. A Member of Parliament, he is the son of the former Sri Lankan Prime Minister Ratnasiri Wickremanayake.

== Early life and education ==
Born to Ratnasiri Wickremanayake and Kusum Wickremanayake, he was educated at Royal College, Colombo and gained a BSc in Agriculture in the Philippines.

== Political career ==
Wickremanayake was elected to parliament from Kalutara from the Sri Lanka Freedom Party in the 2015 parliamentary election and was appointed State Minister of Agriculture. He was re-elected in the 2020 parliamentary election from the Kalutara electorate with 147,958 preferential votes and was appointed State Minister of National Heritage, Rural Arts. Following the mass resignation of the Sri Lankan cabinet in the wake of the 2022 Sri Lankan protests, he was appointed as the Minister of Labour by President Gotabaya Rajapaksa on 18 April 2022. He left office following the resignation of Prime Minister Mahinda Rajapaksa and thereby the whole government. He was appointed to the position of Minister of Buddhashasana, Religious, and Cultural Affairs in the new Sri Lankan Cabinet by President Gotabaya Rajapaksa on 20 May 2022.

== See also ==
- List of political families in Sri Lanka
