= Channa Jayasumana =

Sri Lankan medical academic and politician

Hon. Prof. Channa Jayasumana
- චන්න ජයසුමන சன்ன ஜயசுமன
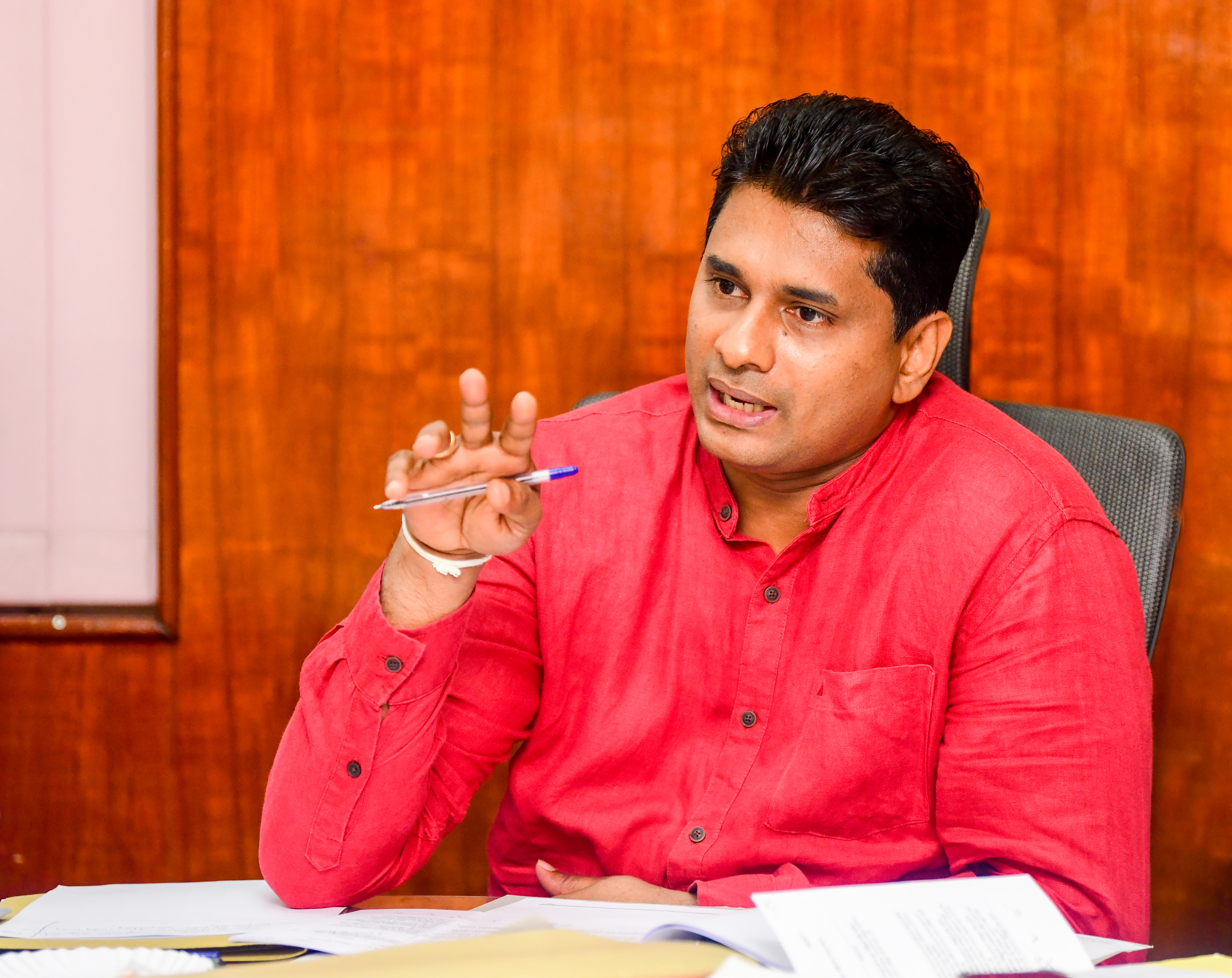

Minister of Health
- In office 18 April 2022 – 9 May 2022
- President: Gotabaya Rajapaksa
- Prime Minister: Mahinda Rajapaksa
- Preceded by: Keheliya Rambukwella

State Minister of Production, Supply and Regulation of Pharmaceuticals
- In office 12 August 2020 – 3 April 2022
- President: Gotabaya Rajapaksa
- Prime Minister: Mahinda Rajapaksa

Member of Parliament for Anuradhapura District
- In office 20 August 2020 – 24 September 2024

Personal details
- Born: January 8, 1980 (age 46)
- Party: Sarvajana Balaya
- Other political affiliations: Sri Lanka Podujana Peramuna (2019 – 2024)
- Education: Kalutara Vidyalaya, University of Peradeniya
- Occupation: Professor in Pharmacology, Medical Doctor, Researcher

Channa Jayasumana is a Sri Lankan medical academic, politician, Cabinet Minister, and member of the Parliament of Sri Lanka for the Anuradhapura District.

== Education ==
Channa Jayasumana was born into a middle-class Sinhalese family in the down-south, Sri Lanka. Both of his parents were government servants. He studied at the Kalutara Vidyalaya and was a famous athlete in his school days. He holds a First Dan black belt in Japanese Shotokan Karate, awarded by the GAT Livera Karate Foundation (formerly the All Ceylon Karate Federation).

Jayasumana entered the University of Peradeniya in 2001 and earned his medical degree (MB BS) in 2007. He has completed his one-year medical internship at Base Hospital, Nawalapitiya, under surgeon WG Jayawickrama and pediatrician Mohomad Nilam Jiffry.

Jayasumana obtained his Doctorate of Philosophy (PhD) for the thesis "Toxicological Aspects of Sri Lankan Agricultural Nephropathy" from the Rajarata University of Sri Lanka with foreign training at California State University, Long Beach, USA. Professor Sisira Siribaddana of Rajarata University, Professor Sarath Gunatilake of California State University, and Professor Priyani Paranagama of the University of Kelaniya were his PhD supervisors. Jayasumana is a fellow of the Royal College of Physicians (FRCP) in Edinburgh, UK since December 2017.

Jayasumana was a pioneering academic staff member of the Faculty of Medicine and Allied Sciences, Rajarata University of Sri Lanka. He joined the Rajarata University medical faculty as a junior lecturer in 2008 and was promoted to the post of senior lecturer in 2015. Jayasumana became a professor in pharmacology in 2016 at the age of 36. He broke the record for the youngest medical professor in Sri Lanka, which was earlier held by Professor Senaka Bibile. Bibile became a medical professor in 1958 at the age of 38.

Jayasumana was the head of the Department of Pharmacology at the Rajarata University of Sri Lanka from 2015 until he entered parliament.

== Research ==
He has done extensive research on drinking water, occupational exposure to pesticides, and their association with chronic kidney disease, which highly prevalent in rural farming communities. Together with his doctoral advisor, Sarath Gunatilake at California State University, Long Beach, Prof. Jayasumana was awarded the AAAS Award for Scientific Freedom and Responsibility offered by the American Association for the Advancement of Science in 2019 for this work, citing "challenging circumstances." It is the highest achievement by a Sri Lankan scientist to date.

Jayasumana has authored 30 papers in indexed international journals. Further, he is an author of the chapter “chronic tubulointerstitial nephritis” in the Oxford Text book of Medicine. Prof. Jayasumana is included in the world's top 2% scientists identified by Stanford University in both 2021,2022 and 2023. The list was created by Professor John P. A. Ioannidis from Stanford University and his research team. It contains a publicly available database of 100,000 top scientists that provides standardised information on citations, h-index, co-authorship-adjusted hm-index, citations to papers in different authorship positions, and a composite indicator. Jayasumana's contribution to the field of nephrology and toxicology with his postdoctoral supervisor Professor Marc de Broe of the University of Antwerp, Belgium is highly recognised on many international platforms.

He has carried out pioneering work in establishing reverse osmosis water purification plants in rural villages affected by Chronic Kidney Disease (CKD) in Sri Lanka, based on his vision of providing “toxin-free water to mitigate CKD.”Today, nearly 80% of the population—about three million people—in endemic regions benefit from this initiative. The project has led to a dramatic reduction in disease incidence and is widely recognized as one of the most successful public health interventions in modern Sri Lanka. Channa Jayasumana is the author of seven books. In addition to medicine, his contributions are in the fields of history and philosophy.

== Politics ==
Jayasumana was an active member of several student unions at the University of Peradeniya. As a student union leader, he was actively involved with Sri Lankan politics in the presidential election held on 2005. Jayasumana contested the parliamentary election held in August 2020 for the Anuradhapura electorate in North Central Province and secured 133,980, a recorded number of preferential votes. Following the election victory, he entered the 16th parliament of Sri Lanka.

Jayasumana has been appointed as the state minister of Production, Supply and Regulation of Pharmaceuticals in August 2020. Following the mass resignation of the Sri Lankan cabinet in the wake of the 2022 Sri Lankan protests, he was appointed as the cabinet Minister of Health by President Gotabaya Rajapaksa on 18 April 2022. Prof. Channa Jayasumana was elected as the Chair of the Caucus of Medical Parliamentarians Sri Lanka during its inaugural meeting held in Parliament of Sri Lanka on 25.04.2024

Dr. Jayasumana currently serves as the Deputy Chairperson of Sarvajana Balaya a political party represented in the Parliament of Sri Lanka. The party was founded by Dilith Jayaweera, a prominent Sri Lankan businessman, entrepreneur, and media mogul.

== Personal life ==
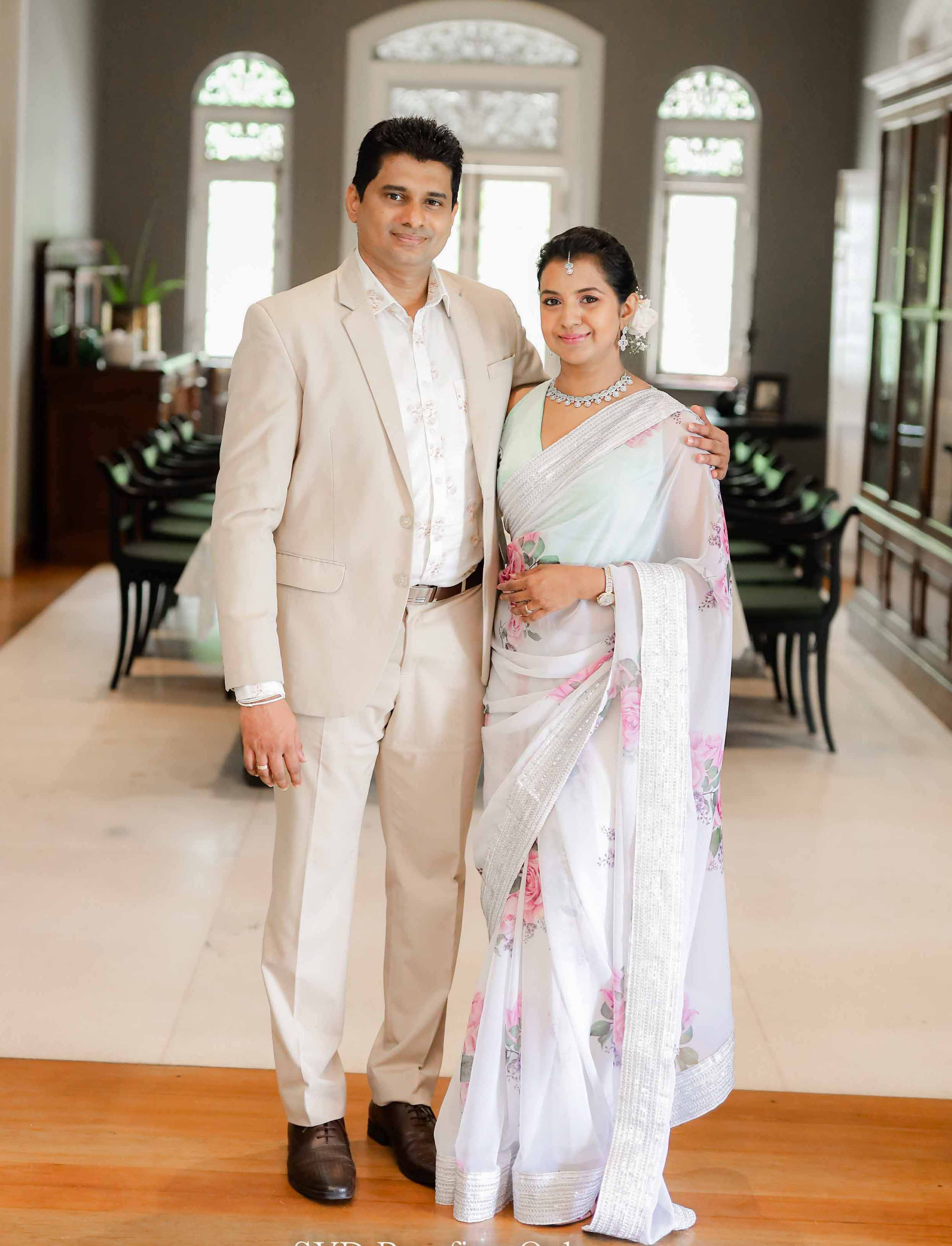
Channa & Ruwi

Channa is a Buddhist. In 2014, he married Ruwi Jayasumana, a Marketing Manager of Soft Logic Holdings a leading private sector business firm, later turned into an entrepreneur. They have a son and two daughters.

Channa's brother is an engineer. His twin sisters graduated in accountancy at the University of Sri Jayawardanapura and are working in the state sector.
