= Nalin Fernando =

Sri Lankan politician (born 1973)

Hon. Nalin Fernando
- නලින් ප‍්‍රනාන්දු நளின் பெர்னாண்டோ

Minister of Trade, Commerce, and Food Security
- In office 20 May 2022 – 23 September 2024
- President: Ranil Wickramasinghe
- Prime Minister: Dinesh Gunawardena
- Preceded by: Shehan Semasinghe
- Succeeded by: Harini Amarasuriya

Member of the Parliament of Sri Lanka
- In office 12 August 2020 – 24 September 2024
- Constituency: Gampaha District

Personal details
- Born: Kachchakaduge Nalin Ruwanjeewa Fernando; 8 May 1973 (age 53)
- Party: Sri Lanka Podujana Peramuna
- Other political affiliations: Sri Lanka People's Freedom Alliance
- Education: University of Northampton
- Criminal information
- Status: Incarcerated
- Conviction: Corruption
- Penalty: 25 years

Kachchakaduge Nalin Ruwanjeewa Fernando (born 8 May 1973) is a Sri Lankan politician and a former Member of Parliament.

Fernando was born on 8 May 1973. He was educated at Joseph Vaz College. He has a master's degree from the University of Northampton. He has held various senior roles at state-owned organisations: Agricultural Products Marketing Authority (director), Ceylon Steel Corporation (director), Co-operative Wholesale Establishment (chairman), Lanka Sathosa (chairman), Paddy Marketing Board (director) and State Commercial (Cooperatives and Wholesale) Company (director).

Fernando was arrested by the Financial Crimes Investigation Division in April 2018, as he attempted to leave Sri Lanka, in connection with the embezzlement of Rs. 39 million of state funds in the purchase of carom and checkers boards in 2014. He was later released on bail. In October 2019 a travel ban imposed on him but it was lifted in December 2019.

Fernando contested the 2020 parliamentary election as a Sri Lanka People's Freedom Alliance electoral alliance candidate in Gampaha District and was elected to the Parliament of Sri Lanka.

== Criminal conviction ==
On 29 May 2025, Fernando was convicted by the Permanent High Court Trial-at-Bar in Colombo and sentenced to twenty-five years of rigorous imprisonment. The conviction relates to a charge filed in 2019 by the Commission to Investigate Allegations of Bribery or Corruption (CIABOC), accusing him of causing a loss of over Rs. 53 million to the government through the irregular procurement of sports equipment for distribution during the 2015 Sri Lankan presidential election.

== Electoral history ==
Electoral history of Nalin Fernando
| Election | Constituency | Party | Alliance | Votes | Result |
|---|---|---|---|---|---|
| 2020 parliamentary | Gampaha District | Sri Lanka Podujana Peramuna | Sri Lanka People's Freedom Alliance | 69,800 | Elected |
