= Ratnasiri Wickremanayake =

Sri Lankan politician (1933–2016)

- රත්නසිරි වික්‍රමනායක ரத்னசிறி விக்கிரமநாயக்க
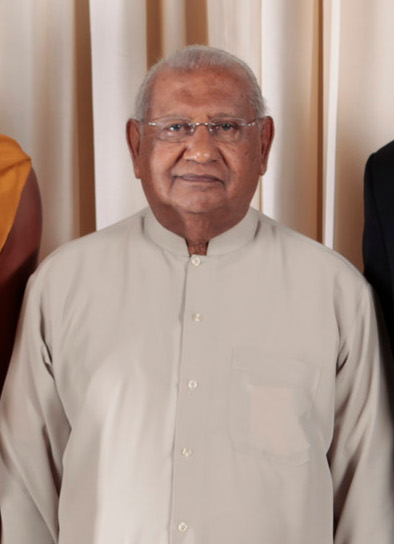
- Wickremanayake in 2009

16th Prime Minister of Sri Lanka
- In office 19 November 2005 – 21 April 2010
- President: Mahinda Rajapaksa
- Preceded by: Mahinda Rajapaksa
- Succeeded by: D. M. Jayaratne
- In office 10 August 2000 – 9 December 2001
- President: Chandrika Kumaratunga
- Preceded by: Sirimavo Bandaranaike
- Succeeded by: Ranil Wickremesinghe

11th Leader of the Opposition
- In office 18 December 2001 – 31 January 2002
- President: Chandrika Kumaratunga
- Prime Minister: Ranil Wickremesinghe
- Preceded by: Ranil Wickremesinghe
- Succeeded by: Mahinda Rajapaksa

Leader of the House
- In office 25 August 1994 – 10 October 2000
- Preceded by: Wijayapala Mendis
- Succeeded by: Richard Pathirana

Personal details
- Born: 5 May 1933 British Ceylon
- Died: 27 December 2016 (aged 83) Colombo, Sri Lanka
- Party: Sri Lanka Freedom Party
- Other political affiliations: United People's Freedom Alliance
- Spouse: Kusum Wickremanayake
- Children: Vidura Wickremanayake (son)
- Profession: Politician

Ratnasiri Wickremanayake (Sinhala: රත්නසිරි වික්‍රමනායක, Tamil: ரத்னசிறி விக்கிரமநாயக்க; 5 May 1933 – 27 December 2016) was a Sri Lankan politician who served as Prime Minister of Sri Lanka from 2000 to 2001 and again from 2005 to 2010, and also served as the Leader of the Opposition from 2001 to 2002. He was a Member of Parliament representing the Horana electorate and later the Kalutara District.

Wickremanayake held many ministerial positions in the Sri Lankan government, beginning in 1970.

== Early life ==
Wickremanayake was educated in Millewa Primary School, Dharmapala Vidyalaya, Pannipitiya, Hartley College, Point Pedro and Ananda College, Colombo and later as a student joined Lincoln's Inn to become a Barrister of Law, but ultimately chose to enter politics rather than appear for the exam. During his time in United Kingdom he was elected president of the Ceylon Students' Association in the United Kingdom in 1955.

== Early political career ==
Wickremanayake entered politics in 1960. He was elected to the legislature in 1960, from Horana for the Lanka Sama Samaja Party (then a part of the People's United Front alliance). Wickremanayake joined the SLFP in 1962. He was re-elected twice (in 1965 and 1970) to the legislature for Horana from the Sri Lanka Freedom Party (SLFP).

Wickremanayake received his first ministerial appointment in 1970, when he was appointed Deputy Minister for Justice in the United Front government under Prime Minister Sirimavo Bandaranaike. In 1975, Wickremanayake was appointed Minister of Plantation Industries and the next year was also Minister of Justice. Wickremanayake lost his Parliamentary seat in the landslide defeat of the SLFP in the general elections of 1977. He became General Secretary of the SLFP in 1978.

In the general elections of 1994, Wickremanayake won the Kalutara District seat and then became Minister of Public Administration, Home Affairs and Plantation Industries in the government of President Chandrika Kumaratunga.

== Prime Minister and Opposition leadership ==
Wickremanayake first served as prime minister from August 2000 to December 2001, succeeding Sirimavo Bandaranaike, who resigned from the position at the age of 84. He was sworn into office on 13 October 2000. He escaped an assassination attempt by a suicide bomber during the 2001 election. He lost his premiership role in December 2001 when his party lost to the opposition party, United National Party, by taking 109 of the 225 Parliament seats.

Wickremanayake was the senior vice-president of the Sri Lanka Freedom Party (SLFP).

After the SLFP won the 2004 parliamentary elections, Wickremanayake was appointed Minister of Buddhist Affairs, Public Security, and Law and Order, and Deputy Minister for Defence. He was sworn in for a second time as Prime Minister of Sri Lanka by President Mahinda Rajapaksa on 21 November 2005.

During Presidency of Chandrika Bandaranaike Kumaratunga, he held the Public Administration, Home Affairs and Plantation Industries portfolios. His son Vidura Wickremanayake is also a Member of Parliament.

During his first tenure as prime minister, he refused to consider talks with the LTTE separatist group, and renounced terrorism. He called for Sri Lanka's family planning policies to be modified, to encourage people to have more children. Wickremanayake was considered a hardline opponent of Tamil separatists. He also opposed the present ceasefire arrangements at the time they were put in place.

During his tenure as the Leader of the Opposition in 2002, Wickremanayake "openly supported unconditional dialogue with the LTTE." On 5 February 2010, he told the Parliament that his government offered the LTTE group amnesty in exchange for surrendering themselves, refused ceasefire appeals from international bodies, and "vowed to crush those who fight on."

== Death ==
On 21 December 2016, Wickremanayake was admitted to a private hospital in Colombo. He died on 27 December 2016 at the age of 83 due to an unspecified illness. He was serving as the Senior Advisor to President Maithripala Sirisena at the time of his death.

== See also ==
- List of political families in Sri Lanka
- Politics of Sri Lanka
- Cabinet of Sri Lanka

Political offices
Preceded by Sirimavo Bandaranaike	Prime Minister of Sri Lanka; 2000–2001	Succeeded by Ranil Wickremesinghe
Preceded by Mahinda Rajapaksa	Prime Minister of Sri Lanka; 2005–2010	Succeeded by D. M. Jayaratne
