= Roshan Ranasinghe =

Sri Lankan politician (born 1975)

Hon. Roshan Ranasinghe
- රොෂාන් රණසිංහ ரோஷன் ரணசிங்க

Minister of Sports and Youth Affairs
- In office 23 May 2022 – 27 November 2023
- President: Gotabaya Rajapaksa; Ranil Wickremesinghe
- Prime Minister: Ranil Wickremesinghe; Dinesh Gunawardena
- Preceded by: Thenuka Vidanagamage
- Succeeded by: Harin Fernando

Minister of Irrigation
- In office 23 May 2022 – 27 November 2023
- President: Gotabaya Rajapaksa; Ranil Wickremesinghe
- Prime Minister: Ranil Wickremesinghe; Dinesh Gunawardena
- Preceded by: Janaka Wakkumbura (Note: As Minister of Agriculture and Irrigation)
- Succeeded by: Pavithra Wanniarachchi

Member of Parliament for Polonnaruwa District
- In office 22 April 2010 – 24 September 2024

Personal details
- Born: 24 October 1975 (age 50)
- Party: Mawbima Janatha Pakshaya
- Other political affiliations: Sarvajana Balaya (since 2024); Sri Lanka Podujana Peramuna (2019–2024); Sri Lanka Freedom Party (2010–2019)
- Occupation: Businessman

Anuruddha Ranasinghe Arachchige Roshan (born 25 October 1975) is a Sri Lankan politician, former Cabinet Minister, and former member of the Parliament of Sri Lanka. He is the current chairman of the Mawbima Janatha Pakshaya. He served as the Minister of Sports and Youth Affairs and Minister of Irrigation, serving simultaneously from 23 May 2022 until his dismissal on 27 November 2023.

He is an old boy of Vidyartha College, Kandy and the founder and Chairman of Euronippon Group of Companies.

== Political career ==
On 27 November 2023, Ranasinghe was removed from both of his cabinet portfolios by president Ranil Wickremesinghe. His removal came after Ranasinghe accused Wickremesinghe of attempting to frame him when he spoke out against corruption in Sri Lanka Cricket. The parliament supported Ranasinghe in his plight against corruption by passing a unanimous but non-binding resolution three weeks earlier.

In 2024, Ranasinghe announced that he would contest in the upcoming presidential elections. This would make him one of two former ministers in President Wickremesinghe's cabinet to run against him, the other being Minister of Justice Wijeyadasa Rajapakshe.
