= Vijitha Berugoda =

Sri Lankan politician

Hon. Vijitha Berugoda MP
- විජිත බේරුගොඩ விஜித்த பேருகோடா
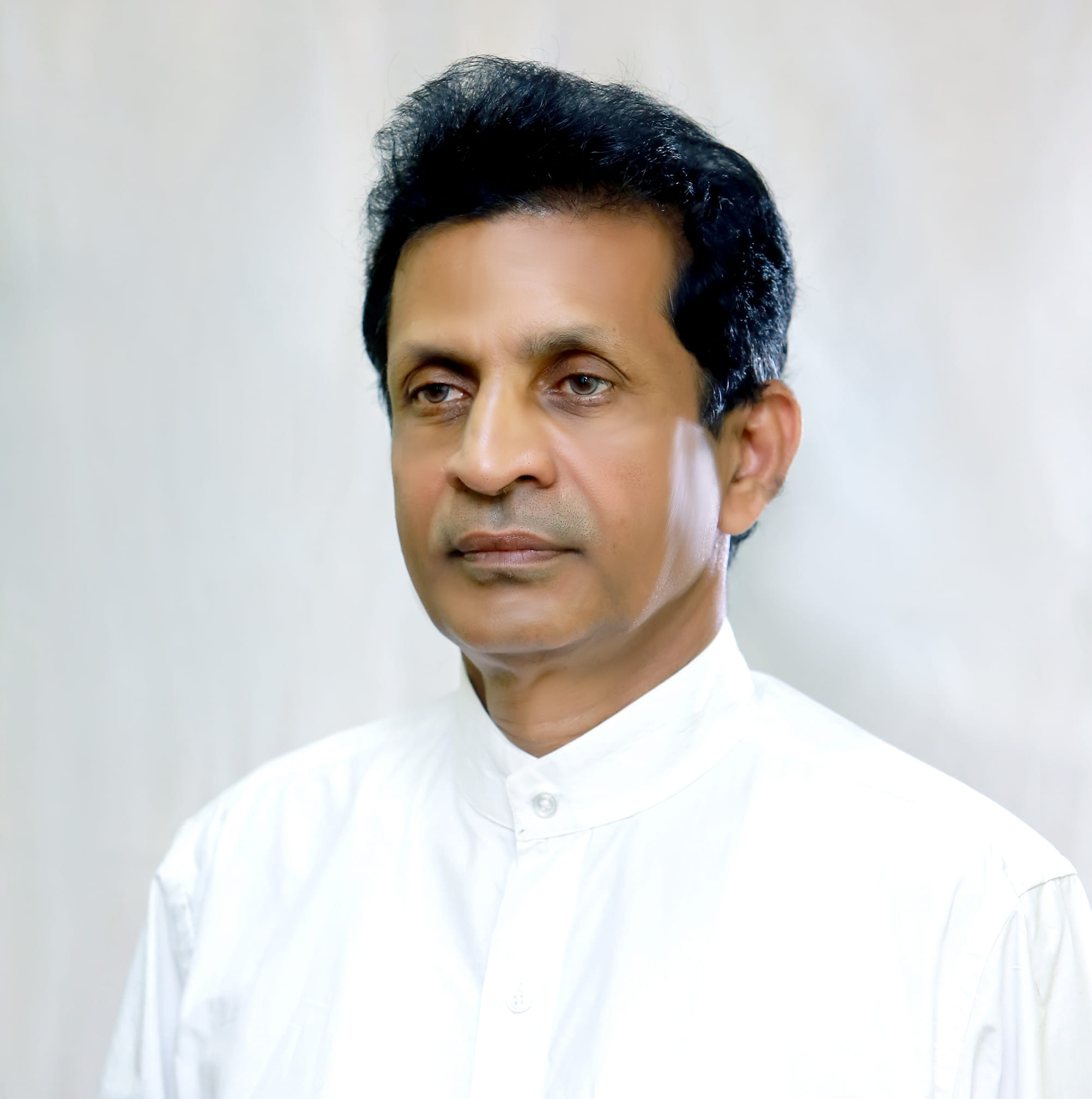

State Minister of Highways
- In office 22 April 2022 – Present
- President: Gotabaya Rajapaksa

State Minister of Dhamma Schools, Pirivenas and Bhikkhu Education
- In office 12 August 2020 – 19 April 2022
- President: Gotabaya Rajapaksa

State Minister of Women and Child Affairs
- In office 22 November 2019 – 3 March 2020
- President: Gotabaya Rajapaksa

Member of Parliament for Monaragala District
- In office 2020–Present
- President: Gotabaya Rajapaksa

Member of Parliament for Monaragala District
- In office 2015–2020
- President: Maithreepala Sirisena

Member of Parliament for Monaragala District
- In office 2010–2015
- President: Mahinda Rajapaksa

Personal details
- Born: 3 September 1959 (age 67)
- Party: Sri Lanka Podujana Peramuna
- Other political affiliations: United People's Freedom Alliance
- Education: Mo/Wellassa National school University of Kelaniya; University of Colombo
- Profession: Teacher

Vijitha Berugoda is a Sri Lankan politician, a member of the Parliament of Sri Lanka. He belongs to the Sri Lanka Freedom Party. He has started his political career as the chairman of Bibila Pradeshiya Sabha in 1998. From 1999, after winning Provincial council election he became a member of Uva Provincial Council and continued until 2010.
