= S. Viyalendiran =

Sri Lankan politician

Hon. S. Viyalendiran MP
- ச. வியாழேந்திரன் එස්. වියාලේන්ද්‍රන්

State Minister of Backward Rural Areas Development and Promotion of Domestic Animal Husbandry and Minor Economic Crop Cultivation
- Incumbent
- Assumed office 6 October 2020

State Minister of Postal Services and Professional Development of Journalists
- In office 12 August 2020 – 6 October 2020

Deputy Minister of Regional Development (Eastern Development)
- In office 2 November 2018 – 15 December 2018

Member of the Parliament of Sri Lanka
- Incumbent
- Assumed office 2015
- Constituency: Batticaloa District

Personal details
- Born: Sathasivam Viyalendiran; 15 November 1978 (age 47)
- Party: Sri Lanka Podujana Peramuna
- Other political affiliations: Sri Lanka People's Freedom Alliance
- Education: Eastern University, Sri Lanka; Madurai Kamaraj University

Sathasivam Viyalendiran (Tamil: சதாசிவம் வியாழேந்திரன், romanized: Catācivam Viyāḻēntiraṉ; born 15 November 1978) is a Sri Lankan Tamil politician, Member of Parliament and state minister.

== Early life ==
Viyalendiran was born on 15 November 1978. He was educated at Veppavettuvan Government Tami School, Chenkalady and Eruvar Tamil Maha Vidyalayam. After school he joined the Eastern University, Sri Lanka, graduating with a B.A. degree. He also holds an M.A. degree from the Madurai Kamaraj University.

== Career ==
Viyalendiran was a member of the People's Liberation Organisation of Tamil Eelam (PLOTE). He contested the 2015 parliamentary election as one of the Tamil National Alliance electoral alliance's candidates in Batticaloa District and was elected to the Parliament.

During the 2018 Sri Lankan constitutional crisis Viyalendiran defected to the United People's Freedom Alliance government. He was rewarded by being appointed Deputy Minister of Regional Development (Eastern Development) in November 2018. He lost his position following the end of the crisis in December 2018.

Viyalendiran contested the 2020 parliamentary election as a Sri Lanka People's Freedom Alliance candidate in Batticaloa District and was re-elected to the Parliament of Sri Lanka. After the election he was appointed State Minister of Postal Services and Professional Development of Journalists. His portfolio was changed to State Minister of Backward Rural Areas Development and Promotion of Domestic Animal Husbandry and Minor Economic Crop Cultivation in October 2020.

== Electoral history ==
Electoral history of S. Viyalendiran
Election	Constituency	Party	Alliance	Votes	Result
2015 parliamentary	Batticaloa District	People's Liberation Organisation of Tamil Eelam	Tamil National Alliance	39,321	Elected
2020 parliamentary	Batticaloa District	Sri Lanka Podujana Peramuna	Sri Lanka People's Freedom Alliance	22,218	Elected
