= Indika Anuruddha =

Sri Lankan politician

Hon. Indika Anuruddha MP
- ඉන්දික අනුරුද්ධ இந்திக அனுருத்த

Member of Parliament for Gampaha District
- Incumbent
- Assumed office 1 September 2015

Personal details
- Party: Sri Lanka Podujana Peramuna

Herath Hitihami Appuhamilage Don Indika Anuruddha is a Sri Lankan politician and a member of the Parliament of Sri Lanka. He was elected from Gampaha District in 2015.He is a Member of the Sri Lanka Podujana Peramuna. He is a Mining Engineer by profession.
