= Tharaka Balasuriya =

Sri Lankan politician

Hon. Tharaka Balasuriya MP
- තාරක බාලසූරිය தாரக பாலசூரிய

State Minister of Regional Co-operation
- Incumbent
- Assumed office 12 August 2020

Member of Parliament for Kegalle District
- Incumbent
- Assumed office 1 September 2015

Personal details
- Born: 16 April 1974 (age 52) Germany
- Party: Sri Lanka Podujana Peramuna
- Other political affiliations: Sri Lanka People's Freedom Alliance
- Spouse: Malintha Bolonghe

Tharaka Balasuriya is a Sri Lankan politician, member of the Parliament of Sri Lanka and cabinet member. He was elected from Kegalle District in 2015 as a candidate of the Sri Lanka Freedom Party.
