= Kanaka Herath =

Sri Lankan politician

Hon. Kanaka Herath
- කනක හේරත් கனக ஹேரத்

Minister of Highways
- In office 18 April 2022 – 9 May 2022
- President: Gotabaya Rajapaksa
- Prime Minister: Mahinda Rajapaksa
- Preceded by: Johnston Fernando
- Succeeded by: Bandula Gunawardena

Member of Parliament for Kegalle District
- In office 2010–2024

Personal details
- Born: Kanaka Herath; 29 April 1976 (age 49)
- Party: Sri Lanka Podujana Peramuna
- Other political affiliations: Sri Lanka People's Freedom Alliance

Kanaka Herath (born 29 April 1976) is a Sri Lankan politician, former cabinet minister, and a member of the Parliament of Sri Lanka. He belongs to the Sri Lanka Podujana Peramuna. He was appointed as the Minister of Highways on 18 April 2022. He served until 9 May 2022 following another mass resignation of the Sri Lankan cabinet.
