= Amith Thenuka Vidanagamage =

Sri Lankan politician

Hon. Thenuka Vidanagamage MP
- තේනුක විදානගමගේ தேனுக விதானகமகே

Minister of Sports and Youth Affairs
- In office 18 April 2022 – 9 May 2022
- President: Gotabaya Rajapaksa
- Prime Minister: Mahinda Rajapaksa
- Preceded by: Namal Rajapaksa
- Succeeded by: Roshan Ranasinghe

Member of Parliament for Badulla District
- Incumbent
- Assumed office 2020

Personal details
- Born: 23 March 1973 (age 53) Kandy, Sri Lanka
- Party: Sri Lanka Podujana Peramuna
- Other political affiliations: Sri Lanka People's Freedom Alliance
- Education: Mahiyangana National School; Trinity College, Kandy; University of Wyoming; Stanford University
- Profession: Businessman

Amith Thenuka Vidanagamage is a Sri Lankan politician, a member of the Parliament of Sri Lanka. He represents the Sri Lanka Podujana Peramuna. He previously served as the Minister of Sports and Youth Affairs. Vidanagame has an extensive background in sports having represented College in Rugby, Cricket, Water Polo and Swimming and has won colors in Water Polo. He is a graduate of the University of Wyoming with a degree in Anthropology and has pursued post-graduate programs at Stanford University in Development Economics and Artificial Intelligence
