= Ramesh Pathirana =

Sri Lankan politician

Hon. Ramesh Pathirana
- රමේෂ් පතිරණ ரமேஷ் பத்திரண

Minister of Health
- In office 23 October 2023 – 23 September 2024
- President: Ranil Wickramasinghe
- Prime Minister: Dinesh Gunawardena
- Preceded by: Keheliya Rambukwella
- Succeeded by: Harini Amarasuriya

Minister of Industries
- In office 20 May 2022 – 23 September 2024
- President: Gotabaya Rajapaksa; Ranil Wickramasinghe
- Prime Minister: Ranil Wickramasinghe; Dinesh Gunawardena
- Preceded by: Dilum Amunugama (Note: As Minister of Transport and Industries)

Minister of Plantations
- In office 22 November 2019 – 23 October 2023
- President: Gotabaya Rajapaksa; Ranil Wickramasinghe
- Prime Minister: Mahinda Rajapaksa; Ranil Wickramasinghe; Dinesh Gunawardena
- Preceded by: Navin Dissanayake
- Succeeded by: Mahinda Amaraweera

Minister of Education
- In office 18 April 2022 – 9 May 2022
- President: Gotabaya Rajapaksa
- Prime Minister: Mahinda Rajapaksa
- Preceded by: Navin Dissanayake
- Succeeded by: Susil Premajayantha

Member of Parliament for Galle District
- Incumbent
- Assumed office 2010

Personal details
- Born: 12 May 1969 (age 57)
- Party: Sri Lanka Podujana Peramuna
- Other political affiliations: Sri Lanka People's Freedom Alliance
- Education: Richmond College (Sri Lanka), University of Peradeniya
- Profession: Physician

Ramesh Pathirana is a Sri Lankan politician, a member of the Parliament of Sri Lanka and former Minister of Health. He previously served as the Minister of Plantation Industries, Minister of Industries and Minister of Education. He belongs to the Sri Lanka Podujana Peramuna. He was educated at Richmond College, Galle and University of Peradeniya. He is a physician by profession and is the son of former Education and Higher Education minister Richard Pathirana.

== Political career ==
He was appointed as Minister of Plantation Industries and Export Agriculture on 22 November 2019.

He was appointed as Minister of Plantation on 12 August 2020 by the SLPP government.

=== Political Interference in the Police ===
After the 20th Amendment to the Sri Lankan Constitution reduced the independence of the police Ramesh Pathirana was accused by other SLPP MPs of assuming the power of the police chief. SLPP legislator Chandima Weerakkody claimed that all police transfers were done according to letters sent by Pathirana where many OICs were appointed according to political ties rather than merit where many inexperienced officers were promoted over senior experienced officers. Thus the police was incapable of handling the mass violence that occurred when loyalists of Mahinda Rajapaksa including those brought by Pathirana attacked peaceful protestors on 9 May 2022. The resulting retaliatory riots destroyed many houses of Rajapaksa loyalists including that of Pathirana as the politicised police was incapable was handling the situation.

== Elections ==
Elected to parliament first in 2010.

In the 2020 general elections held on 5 August 2020 he won the highest preferential votes of 205,814 in the Galle district.
