= Prasanna Ranaweera =

Sri Lankan politician

Hon. Prasanna Ranaweera MP

Member of Parliament for Gampaha District
- Incumbent
- Assumed office 1 September 2015
- Majority: 112,395 Preferential Votes

Personal details
- Party: Sri Lanka Podujana Peramuna
- Profession: politician

Bulathwalage Prasanna Ranaweera is a Sri Lankan politician, a member of the Parliament of Sri Lanka. He was elected from Gampaha District in 2015, representing the Sri Lanka Freedom Party. He was suspended from parliament for a week on 5 May 2016 by the speaker over connection with the tense situation which erupted.

Due to unruly behaviour in the parliament he was summoned by the Parliament Privilege committee in 2018.

During the 2018 Sri Lankan constitutional crisis, Ranaweera allegedly slapped a police officer inside the parliament. Video clips circulating on social media also showed him pouring liquid on the seat of the Speaker of the Parliament Karu Jayasuriya prior to his arrival in to the chamber.
