= Asanka Shehan Semasinghe =

Sri Lankan politician

Hon. Shehan Semasinghe
- අසංක ෂෙහාන් සේමසිංහ அசங்க ஷெஹான் சேமசிங்க

Minister of State for Finance
- In office 8 September 2022 – 23 September 2024 Serving with Ranjith Siyambalapitiya
- President: Ranil Wickremesinghe
- Prime Minister: Dinesh Gunawardena

Minister of Trade
- In office 18 April 2022 – 9 May 2022
- President: Gotabaya Rajapaksa
- Prime Minister: Mahinda Rajapaksa
- Preceded by: Bandula Gunawardena
- Succeeded by: Nalin Fernando

Minister of State for Samurdhi, Household Economy, Micro Finance, Self Employment and Business Development (Note: Minister of State for Samurdhi, Household Economy, Micro Finance, Self Employment, Business Development and Underutilized State Resources Development from 12 August 2020 to 25 September 2020.)
- In office 12 August 2020 – 3 April 2022
- President: Gotabaya Rajapaksa
- Prime Minister: Mahinda Rajapaksa

Minister of State for Development Banking and Loan Schemes
- In office 27 November 2019 – 12 August 2020
- President: Gotabaya Rajapaksa
- Prime Minister: Mahinda Rajapaksa

Member of Parliament for Anuradhapura District
- Incumbent
- Assumed office 2010

Personal details
- Born: November 13, 1976 (age 49)
- Party: Sri Lanka Podujana Peramuna
- Other political affiliations: Sri Lanka People's Freedom Alliance

Asanka Shehan Semasinghe is a Sri Lankan Politician and a member of the Parliament of Sri Lanka from Anuradhapura. He belongs to the Sri Lanka Podujana Peramuna. He is currently serving as Minister of State for Finance, serving with Ranjith Siyambalapitiya since 8 September 2022. Following the mass resignation of the Sri Lankan cabinet in the wake of the 2022 Sri Lankan protests, he was appointed as the Minister of Trade by President Gotabaya Rajapaksa on 18 April 2022. He left office on May 9 following the resignation of then Prime Minister Mahinda Rajapaksa and thereby the collapse of the government.
