= Ministry of Plantation Industries =

Government ministry of Sri Lanka

- වැවිලි කර්මාන්ත අමාත්‍යාංශය பெருந்தோட்டக் கைத்தொழில் அமைச்சு

Ministry overview
- Jurisdiction: Government of Sri Lanka
- Minister responsible: Samantha Vidyaratna, Minister of Plantation Industries
- Website: plantationindustries.gov.lk

The Ministry of Plantation Industries (Sinhala: වැවිලි කර්මාන්ත අමාත්‍යාංශය; Tamil: பெருந்தோட்டக் கைத்தொழில் அமைச்சு) is a ministry in the Government of Sri Lanka.

== List of Ministers ==
The Minister of Plantation Industries is an appointment in the Cabinet of Sri Lanka.

Parties

Lanka Sama Samaja Party Sri Lanka Freedom Party United National Party Sri Lanka Podujana Peramuna National People's Power

Name	Portrait	Party	Tenure	Head of Government	Reference
Colvin R. de Silva		Lanka Sama Samaja Party	31 May 1970 – 2 September 1975	Sirimavo Bandaranaike	
Ratnasiri Wickremanayake		Sri Lanka Freedom Party	1975 – 1977	Sirimavo Bandaranaike	
M. D. H. Jayawardena		United National Party	1977 – 1979	J. R. Jayewardene	
Montague Jayawickrama		United National Party	1979 – 1989	J. R. Jayewardene	
Gamini Dissanayake		United National Party	18 February 1989 – 30 March 1990	Ranasinghe Premadasa	
Ranjan Wijeratne		United National Party	30 March 1990 - 2 March 1991	Ranasinghe Premadasa	
Rupa Karunathilake		United National Party	14 March 1991 - 16 August 1994	Ranasinghe Premadasa	
Ratnasiri Wickremanayake		Sri Lanka Freedom Party	19 October 2000 - 12 December 2001	Chandrika Kumaratunga	
Lakshman Kiriella		United National Party	12 December 2001 – 2 April 2004	Chandrika Kumaratunga	
Anura Priyadharshana Yapa		Sri Lanka Freedom Party	10 April 2004 - 23 November 2005	Chandrika Kumaratunga	
Milroy Fernando		Sri Lanka Freedom Party	23 November 2005 - 28 January 2007	Mahinda Rajapaksa	
D. M. Jayaratne		Sri Lanka Freedom Party	28 January 2007 - 23 April 2010	Mahinda Rajapaksa	
Mahinda Samarasinghe		Sri Lanka Freedom Party	23 April 2010 – 9 January 2015	Mahinda Rajapaksa	
Lakshman Kiriella		United National Party	12 January 2015 - 17 August 2015	Maithripala Sirisena	
Navin Dissanayake		United National Party	4 September 2015 - 26 October 2018	Maithripala Sirisena	
S. M. Chandrasena		Sri Lanka Freedom Party	9 November 2018 - 15 December 2018	Maithripala Sirisena	
Navin Dissanayake		United National Party	20 December 2018 - 21 November 2019	Maithripala Sirisena	
Ramesh Pathirana		Sri Lanka Freedom Party	22 November 2019 - 12 August 2020	Gotabaya Rajapaksa	
Ramesh Pathirana		Sri Lanka Podujana Peramuna	12 August 2020 - 23 October 2023	Gotabaya Rajapaksa	
Mahinda Amaraweera		Sri Lanka Podujana Peramuna	23 October 2023 - 24 September 2024	Ranil Wickremesinghe	
Vijitha Herath		National People's Power	24 September 2024 - 18 November 2024	Anura Kumara Dissanayake	
Samantha Vidyaratna		National People's Power	18 November 2024 - Present	Anura Kumara Dissanayake	
