= Kanchana Wijesekera =

Sri Lankan politician

Hon. Kanchana Wijesekera
- කංචන විජේසේකර காஞ்சன விஜேசேகர

Minister of Power and Energy
- In office 18 April 2022 – 23 September 2024
- President: Gotabaya Rajapaksa; Ranil Wickremesinghe
- Prime Minister: Mahinda Rajapaksa; Ranil Wickremesinghe; Dinesh Gunawardena
- Preceded by: Pavithra Wanniarachchi (Note: As Minister of Power); Gamini Lokuge (Note: As Minister of Energy)

Minister of Power and Energy
- President: Ranil Wickremesinghe
- Prime Minister: Dinesh Gunawardena
- Preceded by: Pavithra Devi Wanniarachchi

Member of Parliament for Matara District
- Incumbent
- Assumed office 1 September 2015

Member of Southern Provincial Council
- In office 2009–2014
- In office 2014–2015

Personal details
- Born: 27 April 1982 (age 44) Matara, Sri Lanka
- Party: Sri Lanka Freedom Party
- Other political affiliations: United People's Freedom Alliance
- Relations: Mahinda Wijesekara
- Education: Royal College Colombo; Trinity College Kandy; Asian International School Colombo
- Alma mater: Monash University

Kanchana Wijesekera (born 27 April 1982) is a Sri Lankan politician who is a member of parliament for Matara District. He is the son of former Cabinet Minister Mahinda Wijesekara.

Following the mass resignation of the Sri Lankan cabinet in the wake of the 2022 Sri Lankan protests, he was appointed as the Minister of Power and Energy by President Gotabaya Rajapaksa on 18 April 2022.
