= Dilum Amunugama =

Sri Lankan politician

Hon. Dilum Amunugama
- දිලුම් අමුණුගම திலும் அமுனுகம

Minister of Transport and Industries
- In office 18 April 2022 – 9 May 2022
- President: Gotabaya Rajapaksa
- Prime Minister: Mahinda Rajapaksa
- Preceded by: Wimal Weerawansa (Note: As Minister of Industries)

Member of Parliament for Kandy District
- In office 2010–2024

Personal details
- Born: 9 May 1981 (age 45)
- Party: Sarvajana Balaya
- Other political affiliations: Mawbima Janatha Party
- Education: Cardiff Metropolitan University (MBA); Trinity College, Kandy

Dilum Amunugama (born 9 May 1981) is a Sri Lankan politician, cabinet minister, and member of the Parliament of Sri Lanka. He belonged to the Sri Lanka Podujana Peramuna.

== Biography ==
He was educated at Trinity College Kandy. And holds Master's of Business Administration from the Cardiff Metropolitan University.

He was appointed as the Minister of Transport and Industries on the 18th of April 2022.

He was appointed as the National Organizer of the Mawbima Janatha Party on 26 September 2024.

== Family ==
He is the nephew of Sarath Amunugama.
