= Ministry of Labour and Foreign Employment =

Government ministry of Sri Lanka

- කම්කරු හා විදේශ රැකියා අමාත්‍යාංශය தொழில் மற்றும் வெளிநாட்டு வேலைவாய்ப்பு அமைச்சு

Ministry overview
- Jurisdiction: Government of Sri Lanka
- Headquarters: 2nd Floor, Labour Secretariat, Colombo; 6°53′30.30″N 79°52′33.80″E
- Annual budget: Rs. 2 billion (2017, recurrent); Rs. 4 billion (2017, capital)
- Minister responsible: Hon. Manusha Nanayakkara, Minister of Labour and Foreign Employment
- Ministry executive: H. M. Gamini Senevirathne, Secretary
- Child agencies: Department of Labour; Department of Manpower and Employment; Employees' Provident Fund; National Institute for Occupational Safety and Health; National Institute of Labour Studies; Office of the Commissioner of Workmen’s Compensation; Shrama Vasana Fund; Employees' Trust Fund Board; Sri Lanka Bureau of Foreign Employment; Ceylon Petroleum Corporation
- Website: labourmin.gov.lk

The Ministry of Labour and Foreign Employment (Sinhala: කම්කරු හා විදේශ රැකියා අමාත්‍යාංශය; Tamil: தொழில் மற்றும் வெளிநாட்டு வேலைவாய்ப்பு அமைச்சு) is the central government ministry of Sri Lanka responsible for labour, foreign employment services and development of Petroleum Resources. The ministry is responsible for formulating and implementing national policy on labour and other subjects which come under its purview. The current Minister of Labour and Foreign Employment is Manusha Nanayakkara. The ministry's secretary is S. M. Gotabaya Jayaratna.

== Ministers ==
The Minister of Labour and Foreign Employment is a member of the Cabinet of Sri Lanka.

Ministers of Labour
Name	Portrait	Party	Took office	Left office	Head of government	Ministerial title	Refs
Peri Sundaram		Ceylon National Congress	1931	1935	Governors of British Ceylon	Minister of Labour, Industry and Commerce	
Claude Corea		Ceylon National Congress	1936	1946	Governors of British Ceylon	Minister of Labour, Industry and Commerce	
I. X. Pereira		All Ceylon Tamil Congress	1946	4 July 1947	Governors of British Ceylon	Minister of Labour, Industry and Commerce	
T. B. Jayah		United National Party	26 September 1947	1950	D. S. Senanayake	Minister of Labour and Social Services	
M. C. M. Kaleel		United National Party	1952	12 April 1956	Dudley Senanayake	Minister of Labour	
M. C. M. Kaleel		United National Party	1952	12 April 1956	John Kotelawala	Minister of Labour	
T. B. Ilangaratne		Sri Lanka Freedom Party	12 April 1956		S. W. R. D. Bandaranaike	Minister of Labour, Housing and Social Services	
M. P. de Zoysa		Sri Lanka Freedom Party	26 September 1959	8 December 1959	W. Dahanayake	Minister of Labour	
C. Wijesinghe		Independent	23 July 1960		Sirimavo Bandaranaike	Minister of Labour and Nationalised Services	
M. P. de Z. Sriwardene		Sri Lanka Freedom Party			Sirimavo Bandaranaike	Minister of Labour and Nationalised Services	
D. S. Goonesekera		Sri Lanka Freedom Party	28 May 1963	25 March 1965	Sirimavo Bandaranaike	Minister of Labour and Social Services	
M. H. Mohamed		United National Party	25 March 1965	29 May 1970	Dudley Senanayake	Minister of Labour, Employment and Housing	
M. P. de Zoysa		Sri Lanka Freedom Party	29 May 1970	23 July 1977	Sirimavo Bandaranaike	Minister of Labour	
C. P. J. Seneviratne		United National Party	23 July 1977	2 January 1989	J. R. Jayewardene	Minister of Labour	
Ranjit Atapattu		United National Party	18 February 1989	5 January 1990	Ranasinghe Premadasa	Minister of Labour and Social Welfare	
D. B. Wijetunga		United National Party	11 January 1990		Ranasinghe Premadasa	Minister of Labour and Social Welfare	
G. M. Premachandra		United National Party	30 March 1990		Ranasinghe Premadasa	Minister of Labour and Vocational Training	
D. B. Wijetunga		United National Party	14 March 1991	1 May 1993	Ranasinghe Premadasa	Minister of Labour and Vocational Training	
Mahinda Rajapaksa		Sri Lanka Freedom Party	19 August 1994	12 November 1994	D. B. Wijetunga	Minister of Labour and Vocational Training	
Alavi Moulana		Sri Lanka Freedom Party	19 October 2000	10 April 2004	Chandrika Kumaratunga	Minister of Labour	
Athauda Seneviratne		Sri Lanka Freedom Party	14 September 2001	10 April 2004	Chandrika Kumaratunga	Minister of Labour, Youth Affairs and Mineral Resources Development	
Athauda Seneviratne		Sri Lanka Freedom Party	10 April 2004	28 January 2007	Chandrika Kumaratunga	Minister of Labour Relations and Foreign Employment	
Athauda Seneviratne		Sri Lanka Freedom Party	28 January 2007	28 January 2010	Mahinda Rajapaksa	Minister of Labour Relations and Manpower	
Gamini Lokuge	Gamini Lokuge	United National Party	23 April 2010	22 November 2010	Mahinda Rajapaksa	Minister of Labour Relations and Productivity Improvement	
Gamini Lokuge	Gamini Lokuge	United National Party	22 November 2010	12 January 2015	Mahinda Rajapaksa	Minister of Labour and Labour Relations	
Wijeyadasa Rajapakshe		United National Party	12 January 2015	22 March 2015	Maithripala Sirisena	Minister of Justice and Labour Relations	
S. B. Nawinne		Sri Lanka Freedom Party	22 March 2015	17 August 2015	Maithripala Sirisena	Minister of Labour	
John Senewiratne		Sri Lanka Freedom Party	4 September 2015	22 May 2017	Maithripala Sirisena	Minister of Labour and Trade Union Relations	
John Senewiratne		Sri Lanka Freedom Party	22 May 2017	12 April 2018	Maithripala Sirisena	Minister of Labour, Trade Union Relations and Sabaragamuwa Development	
Malik Samarawickrama		United National Party	12 April 2018	1 May 2018	Maithripala Sirisena	Minister of Labour, Trade Union Relations and Sabaragamuwa Development	
Ravindra Samaraweera		United National Party	1 May 2018	26 October 2018	Maithripala Sirisena	Minister of Labour and Trade Union Relations	
Gamini Lokuge	Gamini Lokuge	Sri Lanka Podujana Peramuna	9 November 2018	15 December 2018	Maithripala Sirisena	Minister of Labour, Foreign Employment and Petroleum Resources Development	
Daya Gamage		United National Party	20 December 2018	11 January 2019	Maithripala Sirisena	Minister of Labour, Trade Union Relations and Social Empowerment	
Nimal Siripala de Silva		Sri Lanka Freedom Party	11 January 2019	12 August 2020	Gotabaya Rajapaksa	Minister of Labour	
Vidura Wickremanayake		Sri Lanka Podujana Peramuna	18 April 2022	9 May 2022	Gotabaya Rajapaksa	Minister of Labour	
Manusha Nanayakkara		Samagi Jana Balawegaya	20 May 2022	9 July 2022	Gotabaya Rajapaksa	Minister of Labour and Foreign Employment	
Manusha Nanayakkara		United National Party	22 July 2022	Incumbent	Ranil Wickremesinghe	Minister of Labour and Foreign Employment	

== Secretaries ==
Labour Secretaries
Name	Took office	Left office	Title	Refs
M. Madihahewa	25 April 2010		Labour Relations and Productivity Improvement Secretary	
W. J. L. U. Wijeweera	22 November 2010		Labour and Labour Relations Secretary	
W. Kamalini F. de Silva	19 January 2015		Justice and Labour Relations Secretary	
S. M. Gotabaya Jayaratna	8 September 2015		Labour and Trade Union Relations Secretary	
S.A. Nimal Saranathissa	May 2017		Labour, Trade Union Relations and Sabaragamuwa Development Secretary	
H.M. Gamini Senevirathne	November 2018		Labour, Foreign Employment and Petroleum Resources Development Secretary	
