= Ministry of Transport and Highways =

Government ministry of Sri Lanka

- ප්‍රවාහන හා මහාමාර්ග අමාත්‍යාංශය போக்குவரத்து மற்றும் நெடுஞ்சாலைகள் அமைச்சு

Ministry overview
- Jurisdiction: Government of Sri Lanka
- Headquarters: 7th Floor, Sethsiripaya, Stage II, Battaramulla, Sri Lanka; 6°55′37.80″N 79°51′35.70″E
- Annual budget: Recurrent; Rs. 32.919 billion (2019); Capital; Rs. 36.261 billion (2019)
- Minister responsible: Bimal Rathnayake, Minister of Transport and Highways
- Ministry executive: N.B. Monty Ranatunga, Secretary
- Child agencies: Department of Motor Traffic; National Transport Commission; National Transport Medical Institute; Sri Lanka Railways; Sri Lanka Transport Board
- Website: transport.gov.lk

The Ministry of Transport and Highways (Sinhala: ප්‍රවාහන හා මහාමාර්ග අමාත්‍යාංශය; Tamil: போக்குவரத்து மற்றும் நெடுஞ்சாலைகள் அமைச்சு) is the central government ministry of Sri Lanka responsible for transport. The ministry is responsible for formulating and implementing national policy on transport and other subjects which come under its purview. The current Minister of Transport and Highways is Bimal Rathnayake. The ministry's secretary is Nihal Somaweera.

== Ministers ==
The Minister of Transport and Highways is a member of the Cabinet of Sri Lanka.

Ministers of Transport
| Name | Portrait | Party | Took office | Left office | Head of government | Ministerial title | Refs |
|---|---|---|---|---|---|---|---|
| Mohamed Macan Markar | | | 1931 | 1936 | | Minister of Communications and Works | |
| John Kotelawala | | | 1936 | 1945 | | Minister of Communications and Works | |
| John Kotelawala | | United National Party | 26 September 1947 | | D. S. Senanayake | Minister of Transport and Works | |
| John Kotelawala | | United National Party | | | Dudley Senanayake | Minister of Transport and Works | |
| John Kotelawala | | United National Party | 1953 | 1954 | John Kotelawala | Minister of Transport and Works | |
| Montague Jayawickrama | | | | | John Kotelawala | Minister of Transport and Works | |
| Maithripala Senanayake | | Sri Lanka Freedom Party | 12 April 1956 | | S. W. R. D. Bandaranaike | Minister of Transport and Works | |
| Maithripala Senanayake | | Sri Lanka Freedom Party | | 8 December 1959 | W. Dahanayake | Minister of Transport and Power | |
| Robert Edward Jayatilaka | | Independent | 9 December 1959 | 20 March 1960 | W. Dahanayake | Minister of Transport and Works | |
| Montague Jayawickrama | | United National Party | 23 March 1960 | 1960 | Dudley Senanayake | Minister of Nationalised Services, Shipping and Transport | |
| P. B. G. Kalugalla | | Sri Lanka Freedom Party | 23 July 1960 | | Sirimavo Bandaranaike | Minister of Transport and Works | |
| Anil Moonesinghe | | Lanka Sama Samaja Party | 11 June 1964 | March 1965 | Sirimavo Bandaranaike | Minister of Communications | |
| E. L. B. Hurulle | | United National Party | March 1965 | | Dudley Senanayake | Minister of Communications | |
| Leslie Goonewardena | | Lanka Sama Samaja Party | 31 May 1970 | 2 September 1975 | Sirimavo Bandaranaike | Minister of Transport | |
| K. B. Ratnayake | | Sri Lanka Freedom Party | | | Sirimavo Bandaranaike | Minister of Transport | |
| M. H. Mohamed | | United National Party | 23 July 1977 | | J. R. Jayewardene | Minister of Transport | |
| Wijayapala Mendis | | United National Party | | | Ranasinghe Premadasa | Minister of Transport and Highways | |
| Srimanee Athulathmudali | | Democratic United National Front (L) | 1994 | 1997 | D. B. Wijetunga | Minister of Transport, Highways, Environment and Women's Affairs | |
| Dinesh Gunawardena | | Mahajana Eksath Peramuna | 19 October 2000 | | Chandrika Kumaratunga | Minister of Transport | |
| Dinesh Gunawardena | | Mahajana Eksath Peramuna | 14 September 2001 | | Chandrika Kumaratunga | Minister of Transport and Environment Protection | |
| Gamini Athukorala | | United National Party | 12 December 2001 | | Chandrika Kumaratunga | Minister of Transport, Highways and Aviation | |
| Felix Perera | | Sri Lanka Freedom Party | 10 April 2004 | | Chandrika Kumaratunga | Minister of Transport | |
| A. H. M. Fowzie | | Sri Lanka Freedom Party | 23 November 2005 | | Mahinda Rajapaksa | Minister of Railways and Transport | |
| Dullas Alahapperuma | | Sri Lanka Freedom Party | 28 January 2007 | | Mahinda Rajapaksa | Minister of Transport | |
| Kumara Welgama | | Sri Lanka Freedom Party | 23 April 2010 | | Mahinda Rajapaksa | Minister of Transport | |
| R. M. Ranjith Madduma Bandara | | United National Party | 12 January 2015 | 17 August 2015 | Maithripala Sirisena | Minister of Internal Transport | |
| Nimal Siripala de Silva | | Sri Lanka Freedom Party | 4 September 2015 | 14 October 2015 | Maithripala Sirisena | Minister of Transport | |
| Nimal Siripala de Silva | | Sri Lanka Freedom Party | 14 October 2015 | 15 December 2018 | Maithripala Sirisena | Minister of Transport and Civil Aviation | |
| Arjuna Ranatunga | | Democratic National Movement | 15 December 2018 | 21 November 2019 | Maithripala Sirisena | Minister of Transport and Civil Aviation | |
| Mahinda Amaraweera | | Sri Lanka Podujana Peramuna | 22 November 2019 | 12 August 2020 | Gotabaya Rajapaksa | Ministry of Transport Services Management | |
| Gamini Lokuge | Gamini Lokuge | Sri Lanka Podujana Peramuna | 12 August 2020 | 23 May 2022 | Gotabaya Rajapaksa | Minister of Transport | |
| Bandula Gunawardane | Bandula Gunawardane | Sri Lanka Podujana Peramuna | 23 May 2022 | 22 July 2022 | Gotabaya Rajapaksa | Minister of Transport and Highways | |
| Bandula Gunawardane | | Sri Lanka Podujana Peramuna | 22 July 2022 | 24 September 2024 | Ranil Wickremesinghe | Minister of Transport and Highways | |
| Vijitha Herath | | National People's Power | 24 September 2024 | 18 November 2024 | Anura Kumara Dissanayake | Minister of Transport, Highways, Ports and Civil Aviation | |
| Bimal Rathnayake | | National People's Power | 18 November 2024 | Present | Anura Kumara Dissanayake | Minister of Transport, Highways, Ports and Civil Aviation | |

== Secretaries ==
Transport Secretaries
| Name | Took office | Left office | Title | Refs |
|---|---|---|---|---|
| M. Rajendra | 1964 | | Permanent Secretary | |
| D. S. Jayaweera | | | Transport Secretary | |
| D. T. P. Collure | 5 May 2008 | | Transport Secretary | |
| Lalithasiri Gunaruwan | 25 April 2010 | | Transport Secretary | |
| B. M. U. D. Basnayake | 22 November 2010 | | Transport Secretary | |
| Dhammika Perera | 12 January 2011 | | Transport Secretary | |
| Lalithasiri Gunaruwan | 22 January 2015 | | Internal Transport Secretary | |
| Nihal Somaweera | 8 September 2015 | | Transport Secretary | |
