= Ministry of Industries (Sri Lanka) =

Government ministry of Sri Lanka

- කර්මාන්ත අමාත්‍යාංශය கைத்தொழில் அமைச்சு

Ministry overview
- Formed: 1931; 95 years ago
- Jurisdiction: Government of Sri Lanka
- Headquarters: 73/1 Galle Road, Colombo 3; 6.919315°N 79.848821°E
- Annual budget: LKR 2 billion (2016, recurrent); LKR 3 billion (2016, capital)
- Minister responsible: Sunil Handunnetti, Minister of Industries
- Ministry executive: TBD, Secretary
- Child agencies: Ceylon Sugar (Private) Limited; Consumer Affairs Authority; Co-operative Employees Commission; Co-operative Wholesale Establishment; Department of Commerce; Department of Co-operative Development; Department of Food Commissioner; Department of Measurement Units, Standards and Services; Department of Textile Industries; Elephant Pass Saltern; Hingurana Sugar Industry Limited; Industrial Development Board; Internal Trade Department; Kahatagaha Graphite; Lanka Ashok Leyland Limited; Lanka Cement Limited; Lanka General Trading Company Limited; Lanka Mineral Sands Company; Lanka Salusala Limited; Lanka Sathosa Limited; Lanka Textile Mills Emporium Limited; Manthai Salt Limited; National Crafts Council; National Design Centre; National Enterprise Development Authority; National Institute of Cooperative Development; National Intellectual Property Office of Sri Lanka; National Paper Corporation Limited; Paranthan Chemicals Limited; Registrar of Companies; SME Authority; SME Venture Capital Company; Sri Lanka Cement Corporation; Sri Lanka Handicraft Board (Laksala); Sri Lanka Institute of Textile and Apparels
- Website: www.industry.gov.lk

The Ministry of Industries (Sinhala: කර්මාන්ත අමාත්‍යාංශය; Tamil: கைத்தொழில் அமைச்சு) is a cabinet ministry of the Government of Sri Lanka responsible for industry and commerce. The ministry is responsible for formulating and implementing national policy on industry and commerce and other subjects which come under its purview. The current Minister of Industries is Sunil Handunneththi. The ministry's secretary is Thilaka Jayasundara.

The biggest government controlled wholesale and retail chain known as the Lanka Sathosa falls under this ministry. The acronym SA-THO-SA is believed to be derived from the Sinhalese name "SAmoopakaara THOgaveladhaam SAngsthava", i.e., Cooperative Wholesale Establishment.

== Ministers ==
Parties

Governors of British Ceylon United National Party Sri Lanka Freedom Party Mahajana Eksath Peramuna All Ceylon Muslim Congress Sri Lanka Podujana Peramuna National People's Power

Ministers of Industry
Name	Portrait	Party	Took office	Left office	Head of government	Ministerial title	Refs
Peri Sundaram			1931	1935		Minister of Labour, Industry and Commerce	
Claude Corea			1936	1947		Minister of Labour, Industry and Commerce	
George E. de Silva			26 September 1947	1948	D. S. Senanayake	Minister of Industries, Industrial Research and Fisheries	
C. Sittampalam		Independent	1948	1948	D. S. Senanayake	Minister of Industries, Industrial Research and Fisheries	
G. G. Ponnambalam		All Ceylon Tamil Congress	3 September 1948		D. S. Senanayake	Minister of Industries, Industrial Research and Fisheries	
G. G. Ponnambalam		All Ceylon Tamil Congress	19 June 1952		Dudley Senanayake	Minister of Industries and Fisheries	
G. G. Ponnambalam		All Ceylon Tamil Congress		22 October 1953	John Kotelawala	Minister of Industries and Fisheries	
Kanthiah Vaithianathan			1953	1953	John Kotelawala	Minister of Industries, Housing and Social Services	
William de Silva		Viplavakari Lanka Sama Samaja Party		18 May 1959	S. W. R. D. Bandaranaike	Minister of Industries and Fisheries	
W. J. C. Munasinha		Sri Lanka Freedom Party	9 June 1959		S. W. R. D. Bandaranaike	Minister of Industries and Fisheries	
W. J. C. Munasinha		Sri Lanka Freedom Party			W. Dahanayake	Minister of Industries and Fisheries	
Maithripala Senanayake		Sri Lanka Freedom Party	23 July 1960		Sirimavo Bandaranaike	Minister of Industries, Home and Cultural Affairs	
Philip Gunawardena		Mahajana Eksath Peramuna	March 1965		Dudley Senanayake	Minister of Industries and Fisheries	
T. B. Subasinghe		Sri Lanka Freedom Party		1 March 1977	Sirimavo Bandaranaike	Minister of Industries and Scientific Affairs	
Cyril Mathew		United National Party	23 July 1977		J. R. Jayewardene	Minister of Industries and Scientific Affairs	
Ranil Wickremesinghe		United National Party	18 February 1989		Ranasinghe Premadasa	Minister of Industries	
Ranil Wickremesinghe		United National Party	30 March 1990		Ranasinghe Premadasa	Minister of Industries, Science and Technology	
C. V. Gunaratne		Sri Lanka Freedom Party	19 August 1994		D. B. Wijetunga	Minister of Industrial Development	
G. L. Peiris		Sri Lanka Freedom Party	19 October 2000		Chandrika Kumaratunga	Minister of Constitutional Affairs and Industrial Development	
Ronnie de Mel		Sri Lanka Freedom Party	14 September 2001		Chandrika Kumaratunga	Minister of Trade, Industrial Development and Rural Industries	
G. L. Peiris		United National Party	12 December 2001		Chandrika Kumaratunga	Minister of Industrial Development	
Anura Bandaranaike		Sri Lanka Freedom Party	10 April 2004		Chandrika Kumaratunga	Minister of Industry, Tourism and Investment Promotion	
Anura Bandaranaike		Sri Lanka Freedom Party	17 September 2004		Chandrika Kumaratunga	Minister of Industry and Investment Promotion	
Sarath Amunugama		Sri Lanka Freedom Party	22 August 2005		Chandrika Kumaratunga	Minister of Industry and Investment Promotion	
Kumara Welgama		Sri Lanka Freedom Party	28 January 2007		Mahinda Rajapaksa	Minister of Industrial Development	
Risad Badhiutheen		All Ceylon Muslim Congress	23 April 2010	22 December 2014	Mahinda Rajapaksa	Minister of Industry and Commerce	
Risad Badhiutheen		All Ceylon Muslim Congress	12 January 2015	26 October 2018	Maithripala Sirisena	Minister of Industry and Commerce	
Mahinda Yapa Abeywardena		Sri Lanka Freedom Party	9 November 2018	15 December 2018	Maithripala Sirisena	Minister of Industry and Commerce	
Risad Badhiutheen		All Ceylon Muslim Congress	18 March 2019	3 June 2019	Maithripala Sirisena	Minister of Industry and Commerce	
Wimal Weerawansa		Sri Lanka Podujana Peramuna	22 November 2019	3 March 2021	Gotabaya Rajapaksa	Minister of Industry and Commerce	
Dilum Amunugama		Sri Lanka Podujana Peramuna	3 March 2021	18 April 2022	Gotabaya Rajapaksa	Minister of Trade and Commerce	
Ramesh Pathirana		Sri Lanka Podujana Peramuna	18 April 2022	23 September 2024	Gotabaya Rajapaksa	Minister of Trade, Commerce, and Food Security	
Harini Amarasuriya		National People's Power	23 September 2024	18 November 2024	Anura Kumara Dissanayake	Minister of Industries and Entrepreneurship Development	
Sunil Handunnetti		National People's Power	18 November 2024	Incumbent	Anura Kumara Dissanayake	Minister of Industries and Entrepreneurship Development	

== Secretaries ==
Industry Secretaries
Name	Took office	Left office	Title	Refs
Tilak Collure	25 April 2010		Industries and Commerce Secretary	
Anura Siriwardana	12 July 2012		Industry and Commerce Secretary	
S. S. Miyanawala	19 January 2015		Industries and Commerce Secretary	
T. M. K. B. Tennekoon	8 September 2015		Industry and Commerce Affairs Secretary	
