= 15th Parliament of Sri Lanka =

2015–2020 meeting of the Sri Lankan legislature

←	14th	16th	→

Overview
- Legislative body: Parliament of Sri Lanka
- Meeting place: Sri Lankan Parliament Building
- Term: 1 September 2015 – 3 March 2020
- Election: 17 August 2015
- Website: parliament.lk

Parliamentarians
- Members: 225
- Speaker: Karu Jayasuriya (UNP)
- Deputy Speaker and Chairman of Committees: Thilanga Sumathipala (SLFP) (2015–18); Ananda Kumarasiri (UNP) (2018–20)
- Deputy Chairman of Committees: Selvam Adaikalanathan (TELO)
- Prime Minister: Ranil Wickremesinghe (UNP) (2015–18, 2018–19); Mahinda Rajapaksa (SLPP) (2018, 2019–20)
- Leader of the Opposition: R. Sampanthan (ITAK) (2015–18); Mahinda Rajapaksa (SLPP) (2018–19); Sajith Premadasa (UNP) (2020)
- Leader of the House: Lakshman Kiriella (UNP)
- Chief Government Whip: Gayantha Karunathilaka (UNP)
- Chief Opposition Whip: Anura Kumara Dissanayake (JVP) (2015–18); Mahinda Amaraweera (SLFP) (2018–20)

Sessions
- 1st: 1 September 2015 – 12 April 2018
- 2nd: 8 May 2018 – 27 October 2018
- 3rd: 14 November 2018 – 3 March 2020

The 15th Parliament of Sri Lanka, known officially as the 8th Parliament of the Democratic Socialist Republic of Sri Lanka, was the meeting of the Parliament of Sri Lanka with its membership determined by the results of the 2015 parliamentary election, held on 17 August 2015. The parliament met for the first time on 1 September 2015 and was dissolved on 3 March 2020.

== Election ==
Winners of polling divisions. UNFGG in UPFA in TNA in

The 15th parliamentary election was held on 17 August 2015. The incumbent United National Party (UNP)-led United National Front for Good Governance (UNFGG) won 106 seats, an increase of 46 since the 2010 election, but failed to secure a majority in Parliament. The main opposition alliance, the United People's Freedom Alliance (UPFA) won 95 seats, a decline of 49. The Tamil National Alliance (TNA), the largest party representing Sri Lankan Tamils, won 16 seats, an increase of two from 2010. The remaining eight seats were won by Janatha Vimukthi Peramuna (6), Sri Lanka Muslim Congress (1) and Eelam People's Democratic Party (1).

=== Results ===
Party	Votes	%	Seats		
Party	Votes	%	District	National	Total
United National Front for Good Governance (Note: The UNFGG contested under the name and symbol of UNP. The alliance consisted of the All Ceylon Makkal Congress(which contested separately in one district, Ampara), the Democratic National Movement, Jathika Hela Urumaya, the Muslim Tamil National Alliance, the National Front for Good Governance, the Sri Lanka Muslim Congress (which contested separately in two districts, Batticaloa and Vanni), the Tamil Progressive Alliance (the Democratic People's Front, the National Union of Workers and the Up-Country People's Front), the United Left Front and the United National Party.)	5,098,916	45.66	93	13	106
United People's Freedom Alliance (Note: Consisting of the Ceylon Workers' Congress (which contested separately in three districts, Badulla, Kandy and Kegalle), the Citizen's Front (which contested separately in two districts, Nuwara Eliya and Vanni), the Democratic National Front, the Democratic People's Congress, the Liberal Party (which contested separately in four districts, Colombo, Galle, Kurunegala and Matara), Mahajana Eksath Peramuna, the National Congress, the National Freedom Front, Pivithuru Hela Urumaya, the Socialist Alliance (the Communist Party of Sri Lanka, Democratic Left Front, Lanka Sama Samaja Party, National Liberation People's Party and Sri Lanka People's Party), the Sri Lanka Freedom Party, Tamil Makkal Viduthalai Pulikal and the United Citizens’ Front.)	4,732,664	42.38	83	12	95
Janatha Vimukthi Peramuna	544,154	4.87	4	2	6
Tamil National Alliance (Note: The TNA contested under the name and symbol of Illankai Tamil Arasu Kachchi. It consisted of the Eelam People's Revolutionary Liberation Front, Illankai Tamil Arasu Kachchi, the People's Liberation Organisation of Tamil Eelam and the Tamil Eelam Liberation Organization.)	515,963	4.62	14	2	16
Sri Lanka Muslim Congress	44,193	0.40	1	0	1
Eelam People's Democratic Party	33,481	0.30	1	0	1
All Ceylon Makkal Congress	33,102	0.30	0	0	0
Democratic Party	28,587	0.26	0	0	0
Buddhist People's Front (Note: Bodu Bala Sena and the United Lanka Great Council)	20,377	0.18	0	0	0
Tamil National People's Front (Note: Contested under the name and symbol of the All Ceylon Tamil Congress.)	18,644	0.17	0	0	0
Ceylon Workers' Congress	17,107	0.15	0	0	0
Frontline Socialist Party	7,349	0.07	0	0	0
United People's Party	5,353	0.05	0	0	0
Puravesi Peramuna	4,272	0.04	0	0	0
Tamil United Liberation Front	4,173	0.04	0	0	0
Eelavar Democratic Front	3,173	0.03	0	0	0
Our National Front	2,868	0.03	0	0	0
United Socialist Party	1,895	0.02	0	0	0
Jana Setha Peramuna	1,728	0.02	0	0	0
Akhila Ilankai Tamil Mahasabha	1,628	0.01	0	0	0
Okkoma Wasiyo Okkoma Rajawaru Sanvidanaya	700	0.01	0	0	0
Nawa Sama Samaja Party	644	0.01	0	0	0
Sri Lanka Mahajana Pakshaya	626	0.01	0	0	0
New Sinhala Heritage	502	0.00	0	0	0
United Peace Front	488	0.00	0	0	0
Eksath Lanka Podujana Pakshaya	454	0.00	0	0	0
Maubima Janatha Pakshaya	352	0.00	0	0	0
Socialist Equality Party	321	0.00	0	0	0
Sri Lanka National Force	236	0.00	0	0	0
Liberal Party	118	0.00	0	0	0
Democratic Unity Alliance	98	0.00	0	0	0
Sri Lanka Labour Party	62	0.00	0	0	0
Sri Lanka Vanguard Party	49	0.00	0	0	0
Democratic National Movement	47	0.00	0	0	0
Muslim National Alliance	33	0.00	0	0	0
Independents	42,828	0.38	0	0	0
Total	11,167,185	100.00	196	29	225
Valid votes	11,167,185	95.58			
Invalid/blank votes	516,926	4.42			
Total votes	11,684,111	100.00			
Registered voters/turnout	15,044,490	77.66			
Source: Election Commission, Election Commission

The new parliament was sworn in on 1 September 2015. Karu Jayasuriya was elected Speaker, Thilanga Sumathipala as the Deputy Speaker and Selvam Adaikalanathan as the Deputy Chairman of Committees. Lakshman Kiriella was appointed Leader of the House and Gayantha Karunathilaka was appointed Chief Government Whip.

The Speaker recognised TNA leader R. Sampanthan as Leader of the Opposition on 3 September 2015. JVP leader Anura Kumara Dissanayake was nominated to be Chief Opposition Whip.

The Parliament became a Constitutional Assembly on 9 March 2016 in order to formulate a new constitution for Sri Lanka.

Thilanga Sumathipala resigned as Deputy Speaker on 25 May 2018. His replacement Ananda Kumarasiri was elected on 5 June 2018.

Following the withdrawal of the UPFA from the national government, Mahinda Rajapaksa and Mahinda Amaraweera were recognised as Leader of the Opposition and Chief Opposition Whip respectively on 18 December 2018.

== Government ==
On 20 August 2015, the central committee of the Sri Lanka Freedom Party (SLFP), the main constituent party of the UPFA, agreed to form a national government with the UNP for two years. Ranil Wickremesinghe, leader of the UNP, was sworn in as Prime Minister on 21 August 2015. Immediately afterwards, a memorandum of understanding to work together in Parliament was signed by acting SLFP general secretary Duminda Dissanayake and UNP general secretary Kabir Hashim. On 3 September, Parliament voted by 143 votes (101 UNFGG, 40 UPFA, 1 EPDP, 1 SLMC) to 16 votes (11 UPFA, 5 JVP), with 63 absent (43 UPFA, 16 TNA, 3 UNFGG, 1 JVP), to approve the formation of a national government.

Three UNFGG cabinet ministers were sworn in on 24 August 2015. A further 39 cabinet ministers, 28 from the UNFGG and 11 from the UPFA, were sworn in on 4 September 2015. Three more cabinet ministers, one from the UNFGG and two from the UPFA, were sworn in on 9 September 2015. 19 state ministers (11 UNFGG, 8 UPFA) and 21 deputy ministers (11 UNFGG, 10 UPFA) were also sworn in on 9 September 2015. Two more deputy ministers, both from the UPFA, were sworn in on 10 September 2015. A further cabinet minister from the UPFA was sworn in on 23 October 2015. A further cabinet minister from the UNFGG was sworn in on 25 February 2016. A UPFA state minister and two deputy ministers (one UNFGG, one UPFA) were sworn in on 6 April 2016.

=== Constitutional crisis ===
The UPFA withdrew from the national government on 26 October 2018. President Maithripala Sirisena, leader of the UPFA, dismissed Prime Minister Wickremesinghe and replaced him with former President Mahinda Rajapaksa. The following day Sirisena prorogued Parliament. A constitutional crisis ensued as the UNP refused to accept the changes, describing them as unconstitutional, illegal and a coup. Over the next few days, Sirisena appointed a new cabinet consisting of MPs from the UPFA, EPDP and defections from the UNP. Despite the defections, the UPFA could not muster the support of a majority of MPs and with the TNA, which held the balance of power in Parliament, announcing that it would support a motion of no confidence against Prime Minister Rajapaksa, Sirisena dissolved parliament on 9 November 2018 and called for fresh elections on 5 January 2019. The UNP, TNA, JVP and several others challenged the dissolution in the Supreme Court which on 13 November 2018 issued a stay on the dissolution until 7 December 2018.

Parliament re-convened on 14 November 2018 when 122 (100 UNFGG, 14 TNA, 6 JVP, 2 UPFA) out of 225 MPs supported the motion of no confidence against Prime Minister Rajapaksa. Sirisena and the UPFA refused to accept the motion of no confidence, saying that Speaker Karu Jayasuriya had not followed parliamentary procedures. On 16 November 2018, parliament passed an amended motion of no confidence against Prime Minister Rajapaksa with the support of 122 MPs. Sirisena rejected the second the motion of no confidence as well, saying that he would not re-appoint Wickremesinghe as prime minister.

On 3 December 2018, following a quo warranto petition filed by 122 MPs, the Court of Appeal issued an interim order restraining Rajapaksa and 48 ministers from functioning. On 12 December 2018, 117 MPs, including 14 from the TNA, supported a motion of confidence in Wickremesinghe. A seven-bench Supreme Court unanimously ruled on 13 December 2018 that Sirisena's dissolution of parliament on 9 November 2018 was unconstitutional and null, void ab initio and without force or effect in law. The following day a three-bench Supreme Court refused to vacate the Court of Appeal's interim order but allowed for a full appeal to be heard in mid January 2019. Rajapaksa resigned as Prime Minister on 15 December 2018, and Wickremesinghe was sworn in as Prime Minister the following day, ending the crisis.

== Legislation ==
2015

Act No.	#	Act	Certified	Text
9/2015	1	Inland Revenue (Amendment) Act 2015	30 October	
10/2015	2	Finance Act 2015	30 October	
11/2015	3	Value Added Tax (Amendment) Act 2015	30 October	
12/2015	4	Nation Building Tax (Amendment) Act 2015	30 October	
13/2015	5	Economic Service Charge (Amendment) Act 2015	30 October	
14/2015	6	Betting & Gaming Levy (Amendment) Act 2015	30 October	

2016

Act No.	#	Act	Certified	Text
1/2016	7	Local Authorities Elections (Amendment) Act 2016	17 February	
2/2016	8	Fisheries and Aquatic Resources (Amendment) Act 2016	17 February	
3/2016	9	National Minimum Wage of Workers Act 2016	23 March	
4/2016	10	Budgetary Relief Allowance of Workers Act 2016	23 March	
5/2016	11	Prescription (Special Provisions) Act 2016	26 April	
6/2016	12	Microfinance Act 2016	20 May	
7/2016	13	Asian Infrastructure Investment Bank Agreement (Ratification) Act 2016	30 May	
8/2016	14	Registration of Persons (Amendment) Act 2016	7 July	
9/2016	15	Mediation Board (Amendment) Act 2016	21 July	
10/2016	16	Homoeopathy Act 2016	27 July	
11/2016	17	National Research Council Act 2016	27 July	
12/2016	18	Right to Information Act 2016	4 August	
13/2016	19	Fiscal Management (Responsibility) (Amendment) Act 2016	23 August	
14/2016	20	Office on Missing Persons (Establishment, Administration & Discharge of Functions) Act 2016	23 August	
15/2016	21	Animal Feed (Amendment) Act 2016	7 September	
16/2016	22	Registration of Deaths (Temporary Provisions) (Amendment) Act 2016	7 September	
17/2016	23	Universities (Amendment) Act 2016	5 October	
18/2016	24	Code of Criminal Procedure (Amendment) Act 2016	17 October	
19/2016	25	Law Commission (Amendment) Act 2016	17 October	
20/2016	26	Value Added Tax (Amendment) Act 2016	1 November	
21/2016	27	Ports & Airports Development Levy (Amendment) Act 2016	7 November	
22/2016	28	Nation Building Tax (Amendment) Act 2016	7 November	
23/2016	29	Appropriation (Amendment) Act 2016	7 November	
24/2016	30	Appropriation Act 2016	10 December	

2017

Act No.	#	Act	Certified	Text
1/2017	31	Medical (Amendment) Act 2017	21 February	
2/2017	32	Divineguama (Amendment) Act 2017	21 February	
3/2017	33	Land (Restrictions on Alienation) (Amendment) Act 2017	22 February	
4/2017	34	Engineering Council, Sri Lanka Act 2017	9 March	
5/2017	35	Revocation of irrevocable Deeds of Gift on the ground of Gross Ingratitude Act 2017	4 April	
6/2017	36	National Transport Commission (Amendment) Act 2017	7 April	
7/2017	37	Economic Service Charge (Amendment) Act 2017	17 May	
8/2017	38	Civil Procedure Code (Amendment) Act 2017	7 June	
9/2017	39	Office on Missing Persons (Establishment, Administration and Discharge of Functions) (Amendment) Act 2017	3 July	
10/2017	40	Registration of Electors Act 2017	21 July	
11/2017	41	Fisheries and Aquatic Resources (Amendment) Act 2017	25 July	
12/2017	42	Foreign Exchange Act 2017	28 July	
13/2017	43	Nation Building Tax (Amendment) Act 2017	9 August	
14/2017	44	Sugathadasa National Sports Complex Authority (Amendment) Act 2017	17 August	
15/2017	45	Ceylon German Technical Training Institute Act 2017	24 August	
16/2017	46	Local Authorities Elections (Amendment) Act 2017	31 August	
17/2017	47	Provincial Councils Elections (Amendment) Act 2017	22 September	
18/2017	48	Motor Traffic (Amendment) Act 2017	3 October	
19/2017	49	Sri Lanka Sustainable Development Act 2017	3 October	
20/2017	50	Municipal Councils (Amendment) Act 2017	12 October	
21/2017	51	Urban Councils (Amendment) Act 2017	12 October	
22/2017	52	Pradeshiya Sabhas (Amendment) Act 2017	12 October	
23/2017	53	Regulation of Insurance Industry (Amendment) Act 2017	19 October	
24/2017	54	Inland Revenue Act 2017	24 October	
25/2017	55	Electronic Transactions Act (Amendment) Act 2017	2 November	
26/2017	56	Judicature (Amendment) Act 2017	17 November	
27/2017	57	Assistance to and Protection of Victims of Crime and Witnesses (Amendment) Act 2017	17 November	
28/2017	58	Local Authorities (Special Provisions) Act 2017	17 November	
29/2017	59	Prevention of Crimes (Amendment) Act 2017	18 November	
30/2017	60	Appropriation Act 2017	9 December	
31/2017	61	Local Authorities Elections (Amendment) Act 2017	14 December	
32/2017	62	Appropriation (Amendment) Act 2017	14 December	

== Composition ==
The following are the changes in party and alliance affiliations for the 15th parliament.

Date	Government	Opposition	Speaker	Vacant	Total
17 August 2015	106	119	0	0	225
1 September 2015	105	119	1	0	225
National Government
3 September 2015	147	76	1	1	225
9 September 2015	150	73	1	1	225
10 September 2015	152	71	1	1	225
15 September 2015	152	70	1	2	225
22 September 2015	152	72	1	0	225
23 October 2015	153	71	1	0	225
19 January 2016	151	71	1	2	225
26 January 2016	152	71	1	1	225
9 February 2016	153	71	1	0	225
6 April 2016	154	70	1	0	225
17 January 2017	153	71	1	0	225
19 September 2017	152	72	1	0	225
30 October 2017	151	73	1	0	225
2 November 2017	150	73	1	1	225
10 November 2017	151	73	1	0	225
10 December 2017	152	72	1	0	225
11 December 2017	153	71	1	0	225
28 December 2017	152	72	1	0	225
18 January 2018	151	72	1	1	225
6 February 2018	152	72	1	0	225
15 February 2018	154	70	1	0	225
8 May 2018	138	86	1	0	225
23 May 2018	137	86	1	1	225
8 June 2018	138	86	1	0	225
26 October 2018	105	119	1	0	225
UPFA Government
26 October 2018	97	127	1	0	225
28 October 2018	98	126	1	0	225
29 October 2018	100	124	1	0	225
30 October 2018	101	123	1	0	225
2 November 2018	103	121	1	0	225
4 November 2018	105	119	1	0	225
6 November 2018	104	120	1	0	225
14 November 2018	100	124	1	0	225
UNFGG Government
16 December 2018	103	121	1	0	225
18 December 2018	106	118	1	0	225

Light shading indicates majority (113 seats or more); dark shading indicates two-thirds majority (150 seats or more); no shading indicates minority government.

The 15th parliament saw a number of defections and counter-defections:

- 3 September 2015 – 41 UPFA MPs and 1 SLMC MP support the formation of a national government.
- 9 September 2015 – 3 UPFA MPs (Indika Bandaranaike, Sumedha G. Jayasena and Lakshman Wasantha Perera) who had abstained from supporting the national government, are appointed deputy ministers.
- 10 September 2015 – 2 UPFA MPs (Anuradha Jayaratne, Dushmantha Mithrapala) who had abstained from supporting the national government, are appointed deputy ministers.
- 23 October 2015 – UPFA MP Sarath Amunugama is appointed to the cabinet.
- 6 April 2016 – UPFA MP Lakshman Senewiratne is appointed a state minister.
- 30 June 2016 – Democratic Party MP Sarath Fonseka joins the UNP.
- 17 January 2017 – UNFGG MP Athuraliye Rathana Thero announces that he will function as an independent MP.
- 19 September 2017 – UPFA MP Arundika Fernando crosses over to the opposition.
- 30 October 2017 – UPFA MP Duleep Wijesekera crosses over to the opposition.
- 10 December 2017 – MEP MP Sriyani Wijewickrama joins the SLFP.
- 11 December 2017 – NFF MP Weerakumara Dissanayake joins the SLFP.
- 28 December 2017 – UPFA MP Nimal Lanza joins the opposition.
- 15 February 2018 – The Ceylon Workers' Congress pledges support for the president.
- 8 May 2018 – 16 SLFP MPs, who had voted in favour of the unsuccessful motion of no confidence against Prime Minister Wickremesinghe on 4 April 2018, cross over to the opposition.
- 26 October 2018
  - UPFA withdraws from the national government.
  - 3 UNFGG MPs (Wasantha Senanayake, Ananda Aluthgamage and Vadivel Suresh) pledge support for a new UPFA government.
- 29 October 2018 – A new UPFA government including UNFGG MP Wijeyadasa Rajapakshe and EPDP MP Douglas Devananda is sworn in.
- 30 October 2018 – UNFGG MP Dunesh Gankanda joins the UPFA government.
- 2 November 2018 – UNFGG MP S. B. Nawinne and TNA MP S. Viyalendiran join the UPFA government.
- 4 November 2018 – UNFGG MP Ashoka Priyantha joins the UPFA government. Independent MP Athuraliye Rathana Thero pledges support for the UPFA government.
- 6 November 2018 – UPFA MP Manusha Nanayakkara resigns from the UPFA government and joins the UNP.
- 10 November 2018 – 2 SLFP MPs (Wimalaweera Dissanayake and Lohan Ratwatte) join the Sri Lanka Podujana Peramuna (SLPP).
- 11 November 2018 – 34 SLFP MPs (Note: 1. Rohitha Abeygunawardena; 2. Lakshman Yapa Abeywardena; 3. Mahinda Yapa Abeywardena; 4. Mahindananda Aluthgamage; 5. Indika Anuruddha; 6. Tharanath Basnayake; 7. D. V. Chanaka; 8. T. B. Ekanayake; 9. Arundika Fernando; 10. Johnston Fernando; 11. Sudarshani Fernandopulle; 12. Kanaka Herath; 13. Piyankara Jayaratne; 14. Premalal Jayasekara; 15. Sumedha G. Jayasena; 16. Nimal Lanza; 17. Gamini Lokuge; 18. Sanath Nishantha; 19. Susil Premajayantha; 20. Susantha Punchinilame; 21. Mahinda Rajapaksa; 22. Namal Rajapaksa; 23. Prasanna Ranatunga; 24. Prasanna Ranaweera; 25. C. B. Ratnayake; 26. Shehan Semasinghe; 27. John Senewiratne; 28. Janaka Bandara Tennakoon; 29. Thenuka Vidanagamage; 30. Janaka Wakkumbura; 31. Chandima Weerakkody; 32. Duleep Wijesekera; 33. Kanchana Wijesekera; and 34. Anura Priyadharshana Yapa.) and 1 UNP MP (Ananda Aluthgamage) join the SLPP.
- 14 November 2018 – 2 UPFA MPs (A. H. M. Fowzie and Piyasena Gamage) cross over to the opposition. Wasantha Senanayake and Vadivel Suresh resign from the UPFA government and rejoin the UNFGG.
- 18 December 2018 – 3 UPFA MPs (Indika Bandaranayake, Lakshman Senewiratne and Gamini Vijith Vijithamuni Soysa) cross over to the UNFGG government.

== Members ==
=== Deaths and resignations ===
The 15th parliament saw the following deaths, resignations and disqualifications:

- 3 September 2015 – Sarath Chandrasiri Mayadunne (JVP/NAT) resigned. His replacement Bimal Rathnayake (JVP/NAT) was sworn in on 22 September 2015.
- 15 September 2015 – Chamara Sampath Dassanayake (UPFA/BAD) resigned to become Chief Minister of Uva Province. His replacement Lakshman Senewiratne (UPFA/BAD) was sworn in on 22 September 2015.
- 19 January 2016 – M. K. A. D. S. Gunawardana (UNFGG/NAT) died. His replacement Sarath Fonseka (UNFGG/NAT) was sworn in on 9 February 2016.
- 19 January 2016 – M.A.Salman Javid (UNFGG/NAT) resigned. His replacement M. S. Thowfeek (UNFGG/NAT) was sworn in on 26 January 2016.
- 2 November 2017 – Geetha Kumarasinghe (UPFA/GAL) was disqualified by the Supreme Court from being an MP as she holds dual citizenship. Her replacement Piyasena Gamage (UPFA/GAL) was sworn in on 10 November 2017.
- 18 January 2018 – M. H. M. Salman (UNFGG/NAT) resigned. His replacement A. L. M. Nazeer (UNFGG/NAT) was sworn in on 6 February 2018.
- 23 May 2018 – M. H. M. Navavi (UNFGG/NAT) resigned. His replacement S. M. Mohamed Ismail (UNFGG/NAT) was sworn in on 8 June 2018.

=== List ===
Name	^{Elect. Dist.}	^{Pref.} votes	Member From	Member To	Elected Party	Elected Alliance	Current Party	Current Alliance	Notes
Rohitha Abeygunawardena	KAL	127,040	1 September 2015		SLFP	UPFA	SLPP	UPFA	
Ashoka Abeysinghe	KUR	73,184	1 September 2015		UNP	UNFGG	UNP	UNFGG	Deputy Minister of Transport (15–18).
Shantha Abeysekara	PUT	36,390	1 September 2015		UNP	UNFGG	UNP	UNFGG	
Lakshman Yapa Abeywardena	NAT		1 September 2015		SLFP	UPFA	SLPP	UPFA	State Minister of Finance (17–18). State Minister of Public Enterprise Development (17–18).
Mahinda Yapa Abeywardena	MTR	97,918	1 September 2015		SLFP	UPFA	SLPP	UPFA	Minister of Industry and Commerce (18-).
Vajira Abeywardena	GAL	142,874	1 September 2015		UNP	UNFGG	UNP	UNFGG	Minister of Home Affairs (15–18).
Selvam Adaikalanathan	VAN	26,397	1 September 2015		TELO	TNA	TELO	TNA	Deputy Chairman of Committees (15–18).
Lasantha Alagiyawanna	GAM	57,450	1 September 2015		SLFP	UPFA	SLFP	UPFA	Deputy Minister of Megapolis and Western Development (15–17). Deputy Minister of Finance and Mass Media (17–18).
Dullas Alahapperuma	MTR	105,406	1 September 2015		SLFP	UPFA	SLFP	UPFA	
J. C. Alawathuwala	KUR	106,061	1 September 2015		UNP	UNFGG	UNP	UNFGG	Deputy Minister of Home Affairs (18). State Minister of Home Affairs (18).
Ameer Ali	BAT	16,611	1 September 2015		ACMC	UNFGG	ACMC	UNFGG	Deputy Minister of Rural Economic Affairs (15–18). Deputy Minister of Fisheries and Aquatic Resources Development and Rural Economic Affairs (18).
Ananda Aluthgamage	KAN	56,625	1 September 2015		UNP	UNFGG	SLPP	UPFA	Deputy Minister of Tourism and Wild Life (18-).
Mahindananda Aluthgamage	KAN	123,393	1 September 2015		SLFP	UPFA	SLPP	UPFA	
Ranjith Aluwihare	MTL	74,785	1 September 2015		UNP	UNFGG	UNP	UNFGG	State Minister of Tourism Development and Christian Religious Affairs (18).
Wasantha Aluvihare	MTL	75,926	1 September 2015		UNP	UNFGG	UNP	UNFGG	State Minister of Agriculture (15–18).
John Amaratunga	GAM	83,070	1 September 2015		UNP	UNFGG	UNP	UNFGG	Minister of Tourism Development and Christian Religious Affairs (15–18). Minister of Lands (16–18).
Mahinda Amaraweera	HAM	84,516	1 September 2015		SLFP	UPFA	SLFP	UPFA	Minister of Fisheries and Aquatic Resources Development (15–18). State Minister of Mahaweli Development (17–18). Minister of Agriculture (18, 18-). Chief Opposition Whip (18).
Dilum Amunugama	KAN	104,469	1 September 2015		SLFP	UPFA	SLFP	UPFA	
Sarath Amunugama	NAT		1 September 2015		SLFP	UPFA	SLFP	UPFA	Minister of Special Assignment (15–18). Minister of Science, Technology and Research (18). Minister of Skills Development and Vocational Training (18). Minister of Science, Technology, Research, Skills Development, Vocational Training and Kandyan Heritage (18). Minister of Foreign Affairs (18-).
Sivasakthy Ananthan	VAN	25,027	1 September 2015		EPRLF	TNA	EPRLF		
Indika Anuruddha	GAM	78,109	1 September 2015		SLFP	UPFA	SLPP	UPFA	
Hector Appuhamy	PUT	55,475	1 September 2015		UNP	UNFGG	UNP	UNFGG	
A. Aravind Kumar	BAD	53,741	1 September 2015		UCPF	UNFGG	UCPF	UNFGG	
Thalatha Atukorale	RAT	145,828	1 September 2015		UNP	UNFGG	UNP	UNFGG	Minister of Foreign Employment (15–18). Minister of Justice (17–18). Minister of Justice and Prison Reforms (18).
Risad Badhiutheen	VAN	26,291	1 September 2015		ACMC	UNFGG	ACMC	UNFGG	Minister of Industry and Commerce (15–18).
Tharaka Balasuriya	KEG	73,404	1 September 2015		SLFP	UPFA	SLFP	UPFA	
Palitha Range Bandara	PUT	66,960	1 September 2015		UNP	UNFGG	UNP	UNFGG	State Minister of Skills Development and Vocational Training (15–47). State Minister of Irrigation (17–18). State Minister of Irrigation and Water Resources and Disaster Management (18).
R. M. Ranjith Madduma Bandara	MON	82,316	1 September 2015		UNP	UNFGG	UNP	UNFGG	Minister of Public Administration and Management (15–18). Minister of Law and Order (18). Minister of Public Administration, Management, Law and Order (18).
Indika Bandaranaike	KUR	46,356	1 September 2015		SLFP	UPFA	SLFP	UPFA	Deputy Minister of Housing and Construction (15–18). Deputy Minister of Housing and Urban Development (18-).
Bandula Lal Bandarigoda	GAL	66,978	1 September 2015		UNP	UNFGG	UNP	UNFGG	
Tharanath Basnayake	KUR	43,020	1 September 2015		SLFP	UPFA	SLPP	UPFA	Deputy Minister of Telecommunication and Digital Infrastructure (15–18).
Vijitha Berugoda	MON	74,313	1 September 2015		SLFP	UPFA	SLFP	UPFA	
D. V. Chanaka	HAM	51,939	1 September 2015		SLFP	UPFA	SLPP	UPFA	
S. M. Chandrasena	ANU	118,234	1 September 2015		SLFP	UPFA	SLFP	UPFA	Minister of Plantation Industries (18-). State Minister of Social Empowerment (18-).
Chamara Sampath Dassanayake	BAD	64,418	1 September 2015	15 September 2015	SLFP	UPFA	SLFP	UPFA	Resigned. Replaced by Lakshman Senewiratne.
Sirinal de Mel	NAT		1 September 2015		UNP	UNFGG	UNP	UNFGG	
H. M. Piyal Nishantha de Silva	KAL	71,428	1 September 2015		SLFP	UPFA	SLFP	UPFA	
Harsha de Silva	COL	114,148	1 September 2015		UNP	UNFGG	UNP	UNFGG	Deputy Minister of Foreign Affairs (15–17). Deputy Minister of National Policies and Economic Affairs (17–18). State Minister of National Policies and Economic Affairs (18).
Nimal Siripala de Silva	BAD	134,406	1 September 2015		SLFP	UPFA	SLFP	UPFA	Minister of Transport (15). Minister of Transport and Civil Aviation (15–18, 18-).
Thirimadura Ranjith de Soysa	RAT	63,078	1 September 2015		SLFP	UPFA	SLFP	UPFA	
Douglas Devananda	JAF	16,399	1 September 2015		EPDP		EPDP	UPFA	Minister of Resettlement, Rehabilitation, Northern Development and Hindu Religious Affairs (18-).
Palani Digambaran	NUW	101,528	1 September 2015		NUW	UNFGG	NUW	UNFGG	Minister of Hill Country, New Villages, Infrastructure and Community Development (15–18).
Anura Kumara Dissanayake	COL	65,966	1 September 2015		JVP		JVP		Chief Opposition Whip (15–18).
Duminda Dissanayake	ANU	60,071	1 September 2015		SLFP	UPFA	SLFP	UPFA	Minister of Agriculture (15–18). Minister of Irrigation, Water Resources and Disaster Management (18, 18-).
Mayantha Dissanayake	KAN	111,190	1 September 2015		UNP	UNFGG	UNP	UNFGG	
Navin Dissanayake	NUW	66,716	1 September 2015		UNP	UNFGG	UNP	UNFGG	Minister of Plantation Industries (15–18).
Weerakumara Dissanayake	ANU	69,489	1 September 2015		NFF	UPFA	SLFP	UPFA	State Minister of Mahaweli Development (18).
S. B. Dissanayake	NAT		1 September 2015		SLFP	UPFA	SLFP	UPFA	Minister of Social Empowerment and Welfare (15–17). Minister of Social Empowerment, Welfare and Kandyan Heritage (17–18). Minister of Highways and Road Development (18-).
Salinda Dissanayake	KUR	54,318	1 September 2015		SLFP	UPFA	SLFP	UPFA	FState Minister of Indigenous Medicine (18-).
Wimalaweera Dissanayake	AMP	53,537	1 September 2015		SLFP	UPFA	SLPP	UPFA	
T. B. Ekanayake	KUR	82,789	1 September 2015		SLFP	UPFA	SLPP	UPFA	State Minister of Lands (15–18).
Cassim Faizal	AMP	61,401	1 September 2015		SLMC	UNFGG	SLMC	UNFGG	Deputy Minister of Health, Nutrition and Indigenous Medicine (15–18).
Arundika Fernando	PUT	47,118	1 September 2015		SLFP	UPFA	SLPP	UPFA	Deputy Minister of Tourism Development and Christian Religious Affairs (15–17).
Harin Fernando	BAD	200,806	1 September 2015		UNP	UNFGG	UNP	UNFGG	Minister of Telecommunication and Digital Infrastructure (15–18). Minister of Telecommunication, Digital Infrastructure and Foreign Employment (18).
Johnston Fernando	KUR	76,714	1 September 2015		SLFP	UPFA	SLPP	UPFA	Minister of Trade, Consumer Affairs, Co-operative Development and Christian Religious Affairs (18-).
Sudarshani Fernandopulle	GAM	73,553	1 September 2015		SLFP	UPFA	SLPP	UPFA	State Minister of City Planning and Water Supply (15–18).
Sarath Fonseka	NAT		9 February 2016		DP	UNFGG	UNP	UNFGG	Replaces M. K. A. D. S. Gunawardana. Minister of Regional Development (16–18). Minister of Sustainable Development, Wildlife and Regional Development (18).
A. H. M. Fowzie	NAT		1 September 2015		SLFP	UPFA	SLFP	UNFGG	State Minister of National Integration and Reconciliation (15–18). State Minister of National Unity and Co-existence (18). State Minister of National Unity, Co-existence and Muslim Religious Affairs (18-).
Chandrasiri Gajadeera	MTR	54,252	1 September 2015		CPSL	UPFA	CPSL	UPFA	
Nihal Galappaththi	HAM	12,162	1 September 2015		JVP		JVP		
Anoma Gamage	NAT		1 September 2015		UNP	UNFGG	UNP	UNFGG	Deputy Minister of Petroleum and Petroleum Gas Affairs (15). Deputy Minister of Petroleum Resources Development (15–18).
Chandima Gamage	ANU	50,112	1 September 2015		UNP	UNFGG	UNP	UNFGG	
Daya Gamage	AMP	70,201	1 September 2015		UNP	UNFGG	UNP	UNFGG	Minister of Primary Industries (15–18). Minister of Social Welfare and Primary Industries (18).
Piyasena Gamage	GAL		10 November 2017		SLFP	UPFA	SLFP	UNFGG	Replaces Geetha Kumarasinghe. State Minister of Law and Order and Southern Development (17–18). State Minister of Project Management, Youth Affairs and Southern Development (18). State Minister of Youth Affairs, Project Management and Southern Development (18). State Minister of Youth, Women and Child Affairs (18-).
Siripala Gamalath	POL	63,309	1 September 2015		SLFP	UPFA	SLFP	UPFA	
Udaya Gammanpila	COL	198,818	1 September 2015		PHU	UPFA	PHU	UPFA	Minister of Buddha Sasana and Religious Affairs (18-).
Mano Ganesan	COL	69,064	1 September 2015		DPF	UNFGG	DPF	UNFGG	Minister of National Dialogue (15). Minister of National Co-existence, Dialogue and Official Languages (15–18). Minister of National Integration, Reconciliation and Official Languages (18).
Dunesh Gankanda	RAT	92,804	1 September 2015		UNP	UNFGG	UNP	UPFA	Deputy Minister of Disaster Management (15–18). Deputy Minister of Lands and Parliamentary Reforms (18). State Minister of Environment (18-).
Mohan Lal Grero	COL	65,703	1 September 2015		SLFP	UPFA	SLFP	UPFA	State Minister of University Education (15). State Minister of Higher Education (15–18). State Minister of Higher Education and Cultural Affairs (18). State Minister of Education and Higher Education (18-).
Edward Gunasekara	GAM	65,874	1 September 2015		UNP	UNFGG	UNP	UNFGG	Deputy Minister of Internal Affairs and Wayamba Development (18).
Padma Udayashnatha Gunasekara	MON	57,356	1 September 2015		NFF	UPFA	NFF	UPFA	
M. K. A. D. S. Gunawardana	NAT		1 September 2015	19 January 2016	DNM	UNFGG	DNM	UNFGG	Minister of Lands (15–16). Died. Replaced by Sarath Fonseka.
Bandula Gunawardena	COL	96,057	1 September 2015		SLFP	UPFA	SLFP	UPFA	Minister of International Trade and Investment Promotion (18-).
Dinesh Gunawardena	COL	124,451	1 September 2015		MEP	UPFA	MEP	UPFA	Minister of Megapolis and Western Development (18-).
A. R. A. Hafeez	NAT		1 September 2015	19 January 2016	SLMC	UNFGG	SLMC	UNFGG	Resigned. Replaced by M. S. Thowfeek.
Rauff Hakeem	KAN	102,186	1 September 2015		SLMC	UNFGG	SLMC	UNFGG	Minister of City Planning and Water Supply (15–18).
M. H. A. Haleem	KAN	111,011	1 September 2015		UNP	UNFGG	UNP	UNFGG	Minister of Post, Postal Service and Muslim Affairs (15–18).
Sunil Handunnetti	NAT		1 September 2015		JVP		JVP		
H. M. M. Harees	AMP	59,433	1 September 2015		SLMC	UNFGG	SLMC	UNFGG	Deputy Minister of Sports (15–18). Deputy Minister of Public Enterprise and Kandy City Development (18).
P. Harrison	ANU	113,346	1 September 2015		UNP	UNFGG	UNP	UNFGG	Minister of Rural Economy (15–18). Minister of Social Empowerment (18).
Kabir Hashim	KEG	109,030	1 September 2015		UNP	UNFGG	UNP	UNFGG	Minister of Public Enterprise Development (15–18). Minister of Higher Education and Highways (18). Minister of Highways and Road Development(18).
Kanaka Herath	KEG	95,897	1 September 2015		SLFP	UPFA	SLPP	UPFA	
Vijitha Herath	GAM	55,299	1 September 2015		JVP		JVP		
Wijepala Hettiarachchi	GAL	53,413	1 September 2015		UNP	UNFGG	UNP	UNFGG	
M. L. A. M. Hizbullah	NAT		1 September 2015			UPFA		UPFA	State Minister of Rehabilitation and Resettlement (15–18). State Minister of Highways and Road Development (18). Minister of City Planning and Water Supply (18-). State Minister of Highways and Road Development (18-).
Thushara Indunil	KUR	64,359	1 September 2015		UNP	UNFGG	UNP	UNFGG	
S. M. Mohamed Ismail	NAT		8 June 2018		ACMC	UNFGG	ACMC	UNFGG	Replaces M. H. M. Navavi.
Abdul Rahuman Izak	ANU	44,626	1 September 2015		ACMC	UNFGG	ACMC	UNFGG	
Sisira Jayakody	GAM	90,749	1 September 2015		SLFP	UPFA	SLFP	UPFA	
Nalin Bandara Jayamaha	KUR	80,063	1 September 2015		UNP	UNFGG	UNP	UNFGG	Deputy Minister of Public Administration and Management and Law and Order (18).
Sidney Jayarathna	POL	41,295	1 September 2015		UNP	UNFGG	UNP	UNFGG	
Anuradha Jayaratne	KAN	93,567	1 September 2015		SLFP	UPFA	SLFP	UPFA	Deputy Minister of Mahaweli Development and Environment (15–18).
Piyankara Jayaratne	PUT	59,352	1 September 2015		SLFP	UPFA	SLPP	UPFA	State Minister of Law and Order and Prison Reforms (15–18).
Dayasiri Jayasekara	KUR	133,832	1 September 2015		SLFP	UPFA	SLFP	UPFA	Minister of Sports (15–18). Minister of Skills Development and Vocational Training (18-).
Premalal Jayasekara	RAT	154,980	1 September 2015		SLFP	UPFA	SLPP	UPFA	
Sumedha G. Jayasena	MON	69,082	1 September 2015		SLFP	UPFA	SLFP	UPFA	Deputy Minister of Sustainable Development and Wildlife (15–18).
Chandrani Bandara Jayasinghe	ANU	83,666	1 September 2015		UNP	UNFGG	UNP	UNFGG	Minister of Women and Child Affairs (15–18).
Karu Jayasuriya	NAT		1 September 2015		UNP	UNFGG	UNP	UNFGG	Speaker (15–18).
Malith Jayathilake	NAT		1 September 2015		SLFP	UPFA	SLFP	UPFA	
Nalinda Jayatissa	KAL	24,853	1 September 2015		JVP		JVP		
Lucky Jayawardena	KAN	65,461	1 September 2015		UNP	UNFGG	UNP	UNFGG	State Minister of Hill Country New Villages, Infrastructure & Community Development (18). State Minister of City Planning and Water Supply (18).
Kavinda Jayawardena	GAM	81,383	1 September 2015		UNP	UNFGG	UNP	UNFGG	
Akila Viraj Kariyawasam	KUR	286,155	1 September 2015		UNP	UNFGG	UNP	UNFGG	Minister of Education (15–18).
Ravi Karunanayake	COL	111,394	1 September 2015		UNP	UNFGG	UNP	UNFGG	Minister of Finance (15–17). Minister of Foreign Affairs (17).
Gayantha Karunatileka	GAL	149,573	1 September 2015		UNP	UNFGG	UNP	UNFGG	Chief Government Whip (15-). Minister of Parliamentary Reforms and Mass Media (15–17). Minister of Lands and Parliamentary Reforms (17–18).
Lakshman Kiriella	KAN	199,046	1 September 2015		UNP	UNFGG	UNP	UNFGG	Leader of the House (15-). Minister of University Education and Highways (15). Minister of Higher Education and Highways (15–18). Minister of Public Enterprises and Kandy Development (18). Minister of Public Enterprise and Kandy City Development (18).
K. Kodeeswaran	AMP	17,779	1 September 2015		TELO	TNA	TELO	TNA	
Nalaka Kolonne	POL	70,107	1 September 2015		UNP	UNFGG	UNP	UNFGG	
Geetha Kumarasinghe	GAL	63,955	1 September 2015	2 November 2017	SLFP	UPFA	SLFP	UPFA	Disqualified. Replaced by Piyasena Gamage.
Ananda Kumarasiri	MON	44,007	1 September 2015		UNP	UNFGG	UNP	UNFGG	
Nimal Lanza	GAM	94,375	1 September 2015		SLFP	UPFA	SLPP	UPFA	Deputy Minister of Home Affairs (15–17).
Gamini Lokuge	COL	58,527	1 September 2015		SLFP	UPFA	SLPP	UPFA	Minister of Labour, Foreign Employment and Petroleum Resources Development (18-).
Imran Maharoof	TRI	32,582	1 September 2015		UNP	UNFGG	UNP	UNFGG	
M. A. M. Maharoof	TRI	35,456	1 September 2015		ACMC	UNFGG	ACMC	UNFGG	
Vijayakala Maheswaran	JAF	10,263	1 September 2015		UNP	UNFGG	UNP	UNFGG	State Minister of Child Affairs (15–18).
Ajith Mannapperuma	GAM	113,889	1 September 2015		UNP	UNFGG	UNP	UNFGG	Deputy Minister of Environment (18).
M. I. M. Mansoor	AMP	58,536	1 September 2015		SLMC	UNFGG	SLMC	UNFGG	
Tilak Marapana	NAT		1 September 2015		UNP	UNFGG	UNP	UNFGG	Minister of Law and Order and Prison Reforms (15). Minister of Development Assignments (17–18). Minister of Foreign Affairs (17–18).
C. A. Marasinghe	NAT		1 September 2015		UNP	UNFGG	UNP	UNFGG	
S. M. Marikkar	COL	92,526	1 September 2015		UNP	UNFGG	UNP	UNFGG	
Cader Cader Masthan	VAN	7,298	1 September 2015		SLFP	UPFA	SLFP	UPFA	Deputy Minister of Resettlement, Rehabilitation and Northern Development (18). Deputy Minister of Resettlement, Rehabilitation and Northern Development (18-).
Sarath Chandrasiri Mayadunne	NAT		1 September 2015	3 September 2015	JVP		JVP		Resigned. Replaced by Bimal Rathnayaka.
Dushmantha Mithrapala	KEG	64,836	1 September 2015		SLFP	UPFA	SLFP	UPFA	Deputy Minister of Justice (15–18). Deputy Deputy Minister of Buddha Sasana (15–18). Minister of Justice and Prison Reforms (18). Deputy Minister of Justice and Prison Reforms (18-).
Seyed Ali Zahir Moulana	BAT	16,385	1 September 2015		SLMC		SLMC	UNFGG	Deputy Minister of National Integration, Reconciliation and Official Languages (18).
Faiszer Musthapha	NAT		1 September 2015		SLFP	UPFA	SLFP	UPFA	Minister of Provincial Councils and Local Government (15–18). Minister of Sports (18). Minister of Provincial Councils, Local Government and Sports (18, 18-).
Nishantha Muthuhettigama	GAL	75,994	1 September 2015		SLFP	UPFA	SLFP	UPFA	Deputy Minister of Ports and Shipping Affairs (15–18). Deputy Minister of Ports and Shipping (18-).
Sarath Chandrasiri Muthukumarana	ANU	54,460	1 September 2015		SLFP	UPFA	SLFP	UPFA	
Manusha Nanayakkara	GAL	73,387	1 September 2015		SLFP	UPFA	SLFP	UNFGG	Deputy Minister of Foreign Employment (16–18). Deputy Minister of Telecommunication, Digital Infrastructure and Foreign Employment (18). Deputy Minister of Labour and Foreign Employment (18).
Vasudeva Nanayakkara	RAT	81,068	1 September 2015		DLF	UPFA	DLF	UPFA	Minister of National Integration, Reconciliation, and Official Languages (18-).
M. H. M. Navavi	NAT		1 September 2015	23 May 2018	ACMC	UNFGG	ACMC	UNFGG	Resigned. Replaced by S. M. Mohamed Ismail.
S. B. Nawinne	KUR	76,714	1 September 2015		UNP	UNFGG	UNP	UPFA	Minister of Internal Affairs, Wayamba Development and Cultural Affairs (15–18). Minister of Internal Affairs and Wayamba Development (18). Minister of Cultural Affairs, Internal Affairs and Regional Development (18-).
A. L. M. Nazeer	NAT		February 2018		SLMC	UNFGG	SLMC	UNFGG	Replaces M. H. M. Salman.
Charles Nirmalanathan	VAN	34,620	1 September 2015		ITAK	TNA	ITAK	TNA	
Sanath Nishantha	PUT	68,240	1 September 2015		SLFP	UPFA	SLPP	UPFA	
Karu Paranawithana	RAT	47,257	1 September 2015		UNP	UNFGG	UNP	UNFGG	Deputy Minister of Provincial Councils and Local Government (15–17). Deputy Minister of Skills Development and Vocational Training (17–18). Deputy Minister of Science, Technology, Research, Skills Development and Vocational Training and Kandyan Heritage (18).
Buddhika Pathirana	MTR	98,815	1 September 2015		UNP	UNFGG	UNP	UNFGG	Deputy Minister of Industry and Commerce (18).
Ramesh Pathirana	GAL	105,434	1 September 2015		SLFP	UPFA	SLFP	UPFA	
Ajith Perera	KAL	131,383	1 September 2015		UNP	UNFGG	UNP	UNFGG	Deputy Minister of Power and Renewable Energy (15–18). State Minister of Power and Renewable Energy (18).
Dilan Perera	NAT		1 September 2015		SLFP	UPFA	SLFP	UPFA	State Minister of Highways (15–18).
Gamini Jayawickrama Perera	KUR	83,346	1 September 2015		UNP	UNFGG	UNP	UNFGG	Minister of Sustainable Development and Wildlife (15–18). Minister of Buddha Sasana (17–18).
Lakshman Wasantha Perera	MTL	79,309	1 September 2015		SLFP	UPFA	SLFP	UPFA	Deputy Minister of Plantation Industries (15–18). State Minister of International Trade and Investment Promotion (18-).
Niroshan Perera	PUT	59,337	1 September 2015		UNP	UNFGG	UNP	UNFGG	State Minister of National Policies and Economic Affairs (15–18).
Sujith Sanjaya Perera	KEG	53,217	1 September 2015		UNP	UNFGG	UNP	UNFGG	
K. K. Piyadhasa	NUW	48,365	1 September 2015		UNP	UNFGG	UNP	UNFGG	
Hirunika Premachandra	COL	70,584	1 September 2015		SLFP	UNFGG	SLFP	UNFGG	
A. D. Champika Premadasa	KEG	50,695	1 September 2015		UNP	UNFGG	UNP	UNFGG	State Minister of Industry and Commerce Affairs (15–18). State Minister of Plantation Industries (18).
Sajith Premadasa	HAM	112,645	1 September 2015		UNP	UNFGG	UNP	UNFGG	Minister of Housing and Construction (15–18).
Susil Premajayantha	COL	174,075	1 September 2015		SLFP	UPFA	SLPP	UPFA	Minister of Technology, Technical Education and Employment (15). Minister of Science, Technology and Research (15–18). Minister of Public Administration, Home Affairs and Justice (18-).
Niroshan Premaratne	MTR	99,762	1 September 2015		NFF	UPFA	NFF	UPFA	
Ashoka Priyantha	PUT	35,418	1 September 2015		UNP	UNFGG	UNP	UPFA	Deputy Minister of Cultural and Internal Affairs and Regional Development (North Western) (18-).
Susantha Punchinilame	TRI	19,953	1 September 2015		SLFP	UPFA	SLPP	UPFA	Deputy Minister of Public Administration and Management (15–18).
Velusami Radhakrishnan	NUW	87,375	1 September 2015		UCPF	UNFGG	UCPF	UNFGG	State Minister of Education (15–18).
Mujibur Rahman	COL	83,884	1 September 2015		UNP	UNFGG	UNP	UNFGG	
Harshana Rajakaruna	GAM	122,455	1 September 2015		UNP	UNFGG	UNP	UNFGG	
Chamal Rajapaksa	HAM	80,621	1 September 2015		SLFP	UPFA	SLFP	UPFA	Minister of Health, Nutrition and Indigenous Medicine (18-).
Mahinda Rajapaksa	KUR	423,529	1 September 2015		SLFP	UPFA	SLPP	UPFA	Prime Minister (18). Minister of Finance and Economic Affairs (18-).Leader of the Opposition (18).
Namal Rajapaksa	HAM	127,201	1 September 2015		SLFP	UPFA	SLPP	UPFA	
Wijeyadasa Rajapakshe	COL	81,758	1 September 2015		UNP	UNFGG	UNP	UPFA	Minister of Justice (15–17). Minister of Buddha Sasana (15–17). Minister of Higher Education and Cultural Affairs (18). Minister of Education and Higher Education (18-).
Angajan Ramanathan	NAT		1 September 2015		SLFP	UPFA	SLFP	UPFA	Deputy Minister of Agriculture (18, 18-).
Ranjan Ramanayake	GAM	216,463	1 September 2015		UNP	UNFGG	UNP	UNFGG	Deputy Minister of Social Empowerment and Welfare (15–17). Deputy Minister of Social Empowerment, Welfare and Kandyan Heritage (17–18). Deputy Minister of Social Empowerment (18).
Keheliya Rambukwella	KAN	65,687	1 September 2015		SLFP	UPFA	SLFP	UPFA	State Minister of Mass Media and Digital Infrastructure (18-).
Roshan Ranasinghe	POL	76,825	1 September 2015		SLFP	UPFA	SLFP	UPFA	
Arjuna Ranatunga	GAM	165,890	1 September 2015		DNM	UNFGG	DNM	UNFGG	Minister of Ports and Shipping (15–17). Minister of Petroleum Resources Development (17–18).
Prasanna Ranatunga	GAM	384,448	1 September 2015		SLFP	UPFA	SLPP	UPFA	
Champika Ranawaka	COL	100,444	1 September 2015		JHU	UNFGG	JHU	UNFGG	Minister of Megapolis and Western Development (15–18).
Prasanna Ranaweera	GAM	112,395	1 September 2015		SLFP	UPFA	SLPP	UPFA	
Athuraliye Rathana Thero	NAT		1 September 2015		JHU	UNFGG	Ind	UPFA	
Bimal Rathnayaka	NAT		22 September 2015		JVP		JVP		Replaces Sarath Chandrasiri Mayadunne.
C. B. Ratnayake	NUW	45,649	1 September 2015		SLFP	UPFA	SLPP	UPFA	Minister of Posts and Telecommunications (18-). State Minister of Transport (18-).
Sagala Ratnayaka	MTR	85,772	1 September 2015		UNP	UNFGG	UNP	UNFGG	Minister of Southern Development (15). Minister of Law and Order and Southern Development (15–18). Minister of Project Management, Youth Affairs and Southern Development (18). Minister of Youth Affairs, Project Management and Southern Development (18).
Lohan Ratwatte	KAN	129,750	1 September 2015		SLFP	UPFA	SLPP	UPFA	
M. H. M. Salman	NAT		1 September 2015	18 January 2018	SLMC	UNFGG	SLMC	UNFGG	Resigned. Replaced by A. L. M. Nazeer.
Mahinda Samarasinghe	NAT		1 September 2015		SLFP	UPFA	SLFP	UPFA	Minister of Skills Development and Vocational Training (15–17). Minister of Ports and Shipping (17–18). Minister of Ports and Shipping (18-).
Sandith Samarasinghe	KEG	49,442	1 September 2015		UNP	UNFGG	UNP	UNFGG	
Mangala Samaraweera	MTR	96,092	1 September 2015		UNP	UNFGG	UNP	UNFGG	Minister of Foreign Affairs (15–17). Minister of Finance and Mass Media (17–18).
Ravindra Samaraweera	BAD	58,507	1 September 2015		UNP	UNFGG	UNP	UNFGG	State Minister of Labour and Trade Union Relations (15–18). Minister of Sustainable Development and Wildlife (18). Minister of Labour and Trade Union Relations (18).
S. A. Jayantha Samaraweera	KAL	101,139	1 September 2015		NFF	UPFA	NFF	UPFA	
Malik Samarawickrama	NAT		1 September 2015		UNP	UNFGG	UNP	UNFGG	Minister of Development Strategies and International Trade (15–18). Minister of Social Empowerment, Welfare and Kandyan Heritage (18). Minister of Labour, Trade Union Relations and Sabaragamuwa Development (18).
R. Sampanthan	TRI	33,834	1 September 2015		ITAK	TNA	ITAK	TNA	Leader of the Opposition (15–18).
E. Saravanapavan	JAF	43,719	1 September 2015		ITAK	TNA	ITAK	TNA	
Asanka Shehan Semasinghe	ANU	64,865	1 September 2015		SLFP	UPFA	SLPP	UPFA	
Wasantha Senanayake	POL	75,651	1 September 2015		UNP	UNFGG	UNP	UNFGG	State Minister of Irrigation and Water Resources Management (15–17). State Minister of Foreign Affairs(17–18). Minister of Tourism and Wild Life (18-).
Chathura Senarathne	GAM	71,243	1 September 2015		DNM	UNFGG	DNM	UNFGG	
Rajitha Senaratne	KAL	142,196	1 September 2015		DNM	UNFGG	DNM	UNFGG	Minister of Health, Nutrition and Indigenous Medicine (15–18).
Sujeewa Senasinghe	COL	117,049	1 September 2015		UNP	UNFGG	UNP	UNFGG	State Minister of International Trade (15–18).
Mavai Senathirajah	JAF	58,882	1 September 2015		ITAK	TNA	ITAK	TNA	
John Senewiratne	RAT	90,472	1 September 2015		SLFP	UPFA	SLPP	UPFA	Minister of Labour and Trade Union Relations (15–17). Minister of Labour, Trade Union Relations and Sabaragamuwa Development (17–18).
Lakshman Senewiratne	BAD	42,354	22 September 2015		SLFP	UPFA	SLFP	UPFA	Replaces Chamara Sampath Dassanayake. State Minister of Science, Technology and Research (15–18). State Minister of Science, Technology, Research, Skills Development and Vocational Training and Kandyan Heritage (18). State Minister of Defence (18-).
D. Siddarthan	JAF	53,741	1 September 2015		PLOTE	TNA	PLOTE	TNA	
Mohan Silva	GAL	53,076	1 September 2015		SLFP	UPFA	SLFP	UPFA	
G. Sirinesan	BAT	48,821	1 September 2015		ITAK	TNA	ITAK	TNA	
Muthu Sivalingam	NUW	45,352	1 September 2015		CWC	UPFA	CWC	UPFA	Deputy Minister of Primary Industries (18). Deputy Minister of Social Welfare and Primary Industries (18).
S. Sivamohan	VAN	18,412	1 September 2015		EPRLF	TNA	EPRLF	TNA	
Ranjith Siyambalapitiya	KEG	62,098	1 September 2015		SLFP	UPFA	SLFP	UPFA	Minister of Power and Renewable Energy (15–18). Minister of Disaster Management (18). Minister of Power and Renewable Energy (18-).
Gamini Vijith Vijithamuni Soysa	NAT		1 September 2015		SLFP	UPFA	SLFP	UPFA	Minister of Irrigation and Water Resource Management (15–18). Minister of Fisheries, Aquatic Resources Development and Rural Economic Affairs (18, 18-).
Shanthi Sriskantharajah	NAT		1 September 2015		ITAK	TNA	ITAK	TNA	
S. Sritharan	JAF	72,258	1 September 2015		ITAK	TNA	ITAK	TNA	
M. A. Sumanthiran	JAF	58,043	1 September 2015		ITAK	TNA	ITAK	TNA	
Thilanga Sumathipala	NAT		1 September 2015		SLFP	UPFA	SLFP	UPFA	Deputy Speaker & Chairman of Committees (15–18).
Vadivel Suresh	BAD	52,378	1 September 2015		UNP	UNFGG	UNP	UNFGG	State Minister of Plantation Industries (18-).
D. M. Swaminathan	NAT		1 September 2015		UNP	UNFGG	UNP	UNFGG	Minister of Rehabilitation and Resettlement (15). Minister of Rehabilitation, Resettlement and Hindu Religious Affairs (15). Minister of Prison Reforms, Rehabilitation, Resettlement and Hindu Religious Affairs (15–18). Minister of Resettlement, Rehabilitation, Northern Development and Hindu Religious Affairs (18).
Janaka Bandara Tennakoon	MTL	61,920	1 September 2015		SLFP	UPFA	SLPP	UPFA	
Palitha Thewarapperuma	KAL	118,128	22 September 2015		UNP	UNFGG	UNP	UNFGG	Deputy Minister of Internal Affairs, Wayamba Development and Cultural Affairs (16–18). Deputy Minister of Sustainable Development, Wildlife and Regional Development (18).
M. Thilakarajah	NUW	67,761	1 September 2015		NUW	UNFGG	NUW	UNFGG	
Arumugan Thondaman	NUW	61,897	1 September 2015		CWC	UPFA	CWC	UPFA	Minister of Hill Country New Villages, Infrastructure and Community Development (18-).
M. S. Thowfeek	NAT		26 January 2016		SLMC	UNFGG	SLMC	UNFGG	Replaces A. R. A. Hafeez.
K. Thurairetnasingam	NAT		1 September 2015		ITAK	TNA	ITAK	TNA	
M. Velu Kumar	KAN	62,556	1 September 2015		DPF	UNFGG	DPF	UNFGG	
Thenuka Vidanagamage	BAD	43,517	1 September 2015		SLFP	UPFA	SLPP	UPFA	
S. Viyalendiran	BAT	39,321	1 September 2015		PLOTE	TNA	PLOTE	UPFA	Deputy Minister of Regional Development (Eastern Development) (18-).
Janaka Wakkumbura	RAT	69,014	1 September 2015		SLFP	UPFA	SLPP	UPFA	
Pavithra Devi Wanniarachchi	RAT	87,660	1 September 2015		SLFP	UPFA	SLFP	UPFA	State Minister of Petroleum Resources Development (18-).
Dilip Wedaarachchi	HAM	65,391	1 September 2015		UNP	UNFGG	UNP	UNFGG	State Minister of Fisheries and Aquatic Resources Development (15–18). State Minister of Fisheries and Aquatic Resources Development and Rural Economic Affairs (18).
Chandima Weerakkody	GAL	114,851	1 September 2015		SLFP	UPFA	SLPP	UPFA	Minister of Petroleum and Gas (15). Minister of Petroleum Resources Development (15–17). Minister of Skills Development and Vocational Training (17–18).
Wimal Weerawansa	COL	313,801	1 September 2015		NFF	UPFA	NFF	UPFA	Minister of Housing and Social Welfare (18-).
Kumara Welgama	KAL	218,614	1 September 2015		SLFP	UPFA	SLFP	UPFA	
Jayampathy Wickramaratne	NAT		1 September 2015		DNM	UNFGG	DNM	UNFGG	
M.A.Salman Javid	COL	82,738	1 September 2015		UNP	UNFGG	UNP	UNFGG	Deputy Minister of Public Enterprise Development (15–17). State Minister of Finance (17–18).
Vidura Wickremenayake	KAL	90,488	1 September 2015		SLFP	UPFA	SLFP	UPFA	
Ranil Wickremesinghe	COL	500,566	1 September 2015		UNP	UNFGG	UNP	UNFGG	Prime Minister (15–18, 18-). Minister of National Policies and Economic Affairs (15–18). Minister of Law and Order (18).
L. A. Wijemanne	KAL	58,219	1 September 2015		UNP	UNFGG	UNP	UNFGG	
Thusitha Wijemanne	KEG	50,893	1 September 2015		UNP	UNFGG	UNP	UNFGG	
R. Wijerathne	MTL	41,766	1 September 2015		UNP	UNFGG	UNP	UNFGG	
Duleep Wijesekera	GAM	58,936	1 September 2015		SLFP	UPFA	SLPP	UPFA	Deputy Minister of Post, Postal Services and Muslim Religious Affairs (15–17).
Kanchana Wijesekera	MTR	83,278	1 September 2015		SLFP	UPFA	SLPP	UPFA	
Chaminda Wijesiri	BAD	58,291	1 September 2015		UNP	UNFGG	UNP	UNFGG	
A. A. Wijethunga	RAT	67,841	1 September 2015		UNP	UNFGG	UNP	UNFGG	
Ruwan Wijewardene	GAM	157,932	1 September 2015		UNP	UNFGG	UNP	UNFGG	State Minister of Defence (15–18).
Sriyani Wijewickrama	AMP	49,691	1 September 2015		MEP	UPFA	SLFP	UPFA	State Minister of Provincial Councils and Local Government (17–18). State Minister of Provincial Councils, Local Government and Sports (18, 18-).
Wijaya Withanage	RAT	67,846	1 September 2015		UNP	UNFGG	UNP	UNFGG	
Anura Priyadharshana Yapa	KUR	77,057	1 September 2015		SLFP	UPFA	SLPP	UPFA	Minister of Disaster Management (15–18). State Minister of Finance (18-).
S. Yogeswaran	BAT	34,039	1 September 2015		ITAK	TNA	ITAK	TNA	

== Sources ==
- "Part I : Section (I) — General Government Notifications Parliamentary Elections Act, No. 1 OF 1981" (PDF). The Gazette of the Democratic Socialist Republic of Sri Lanka Extraordinary. 1928/03. 19 August 2015. Archived from the original (PDF) on 23 September 2015.
- "Part I : Section (I) — General Government Notifications Parliamentary Election — 2015 Declaration under Article 99A of the Constitution" (PDF). The Gazette of the Democratic Socialist Republic of Sri Lanka Extraordinary. 1928/25. 21 August 2015. Archived from the original (PDF) on 23 September 2015.
- "Part I : Section (I) — General Appointments & c., by the President" (PDF). The Gazette of the Democratic Socialist Republic of Sri Lanka Extraordinary. 1929/02. 24 August 2015. Archived from the original (PDF) on 23 September 2015.
- "Part I : Section (I) — General Government Notifications Parliamentary Election — 2015 Declaration under Article 99A of the Constitution" (PDF). The Gazette of the Democratic Socialist Republic of Sri Lanka Extraordinary. 1929/04. 24 August 2015. Archived from the original (PDF) on 23 September 2015.
- "Part I : Section (I) — General Appointments & c., by the President" (PDF). The Gazette of the Democratic Socialist Republic of Sri Lanka Extraordinary. 1929/15. 26 August 2015. Archived from the original (PDF) on 23 September 2015.
- "Part I : Section (I) — General Appointments & c., by the President" (PDF). The Gazette of the Democratic Socialist Republic of Sri Lanka Extraordinary. 1932/07. 14 September 2015.
- "Part I : Section (I) — General Appointments & c., by the President" (PDF). The Gazette of the Democratic Socialist Republic of Sri Lanka Extraordinary. 1932/69. 18 September 2015.
- "Part I : Section (I) — General Appointments & c., by the President" (PDF). The Gazette of the Democratic Socialist Republic of Sri Lanka Extraordinary. 1933/17. 22 September 2015.
- Jayakody, Pradeep (28 August 2015). "The Comparison of Preferential Votes in 2015 & 2010". The Daily Mirror.
- "Ranil tops with over 500,000 votes in Colombo". The Daily Mirror. 19 August 2015.
- "Preferential Votes". Daily News. 19 August 2015.
- "JVP names Handunnetti and Mayadunne through National List". The Nation. 20 August 2015. Archived from the original on 22 October 2015.
- "UNP national list". The Daily Mirror. 21 August 2015.
- "UPFA finalises National list". The Daily Mirror. 21 August 2015.FA
- "TNA names its national List MPs". The Daily Mirror. 24 August 2015.
