= Non-cabinet minister (Sri Lanka) =

In Sri Lanka, a Non-cabinet minister (also referred to as Minister of State, State minister, Project minister, District minister, Senior minister) is politician who is a Minister, but not a member of the Cabinet of Ministers. A non-cabinet minister is ranked below a cabinet minister, but above a deputy minister. A non-cabinet minister can be in charge of a ministry, be attached a ministry of a cabinet minister or be without a ministry. A cabinet minister may hold another non-cabinet minister post with a different subject concurrently.

== Appointment ==
Under the article 44 of the Sri Lankan Constitution, the President on the advice of the Prime Minister can appoint a Member of Parliament as a Minister who will not be a member of the Cabinet of Ministers and assign subjects and functions, as well as ministries (if any) which are to be in charge of. The President can change the subjects and functions assigned to the Minister.

== History ==
The appointment of Non-cabinet ministers was set out under the Constitution of 1978. President J. R. Jayawardene appointed non-cabinet ministers and district ministers. President Ranasinghe Premadasa appointed both non-cabinet ministers and ministers of state. President Chandrika Kumaratunga appointed non-cabinet ministers with the title of project ministers. President Mahinda Rajapaksa appointed non-cabinet minister, project ministers and senior ministers. President Maithripala Sirisena appointed non-cabinet ministers with the title of state minister. President Gotabaya Rajapaksa appointed state ministers.

== Powers and duties ==
A Cabinet Minister by publishing in the Gazette can delegate to a non-cabinet minister any power or duty coming under the subject or function assigned to the cabinet minister by law. The Minister is responsible to the Cabinet of Ministers and to Parliament.

== Privileges of office ==
=== Salary ===
A Minister or State Minister would receive a salary of Rs. 140,000 (having been increased from 65,000 from January 2018); paid monthly from the respective ministry budget. In addition, since all ministers are members of parliament they are entitled to allowances and benefits of parliamentarians.

=== Official residence and office ===
A Minister is entitled to an official residence, they have an office and personal staff allocated from their ministry.

=== Travel ===
Each minister is entitled to three vehicles, which includes an official vehicle and security vehicles provided and maintained by their ministry. For domestic air travel, helicopters from the No. 4 (VVIP/VIP) Helicopter Squadron of the Sri Lanka Air Force are charted by the ministry.

=== Security ===
Traditionally security for the ministers have been provided by the Sri Lanka Police since the 1987–1989 JVP insurrection. During emergencies military units have been allocated to bolster security to certain ministers based on treat levels. At present the Ministerial Security Division is in charge of security of ministers.

=== Order of precedence ===
In the Sri Lankan order of precedence, non-cabinet ministers are placed after the Governor of the Province (within their respective province) and the Chief Minister (within their respective province).

== List of current state ministers ==
List of current state ministers under the Second Gotabaya Rajapaksa cabinet is as follows;

- Chamal Rajapaksa - State Minister of Internal Security, Home Affairs and Disaster Management.
- Ajith Nivard Cabraal - State Minister of Finance and Capital Markets and Public Enterprise Reforms.
- Shehan Semasinghe - State Minister of Samurdhi, Micro Finance, Self-Employment and Business Development.
- Vidura Wickramanayake - State Minister of National Heritage, Performing Arts and Folk Art Promotion.
- Nalaka Godahewa - State Minister of Urban Development, Coast Conservation, Waste Disposal and Public Sanitation.
- Indika Anuruddha - State Minister of Rural Housing and Construction.
- Jeevan Thondaman - State Minister of Estate Houses and Community Infrastructure.
- Sudarshani Fernandopulle - State Minister of Prisons Reforms and Prisoners' Rehabilitation.
- Tharaka Balasuriya - State Minister of Regional Cooperation.
- Sarath Weerasekara - State Minister of Provincial Councils and Local Government Affairs.
- Piyal Nishantha - State Minister of Women and Child Affairs, Pre-School and Primary Education, School Infrastructure and Education Services.
- Seetha Arambepola - State Minister of Skills Development, Vocational Education, Research and Innovation.
- Vijitha Berugoda - State Minister of Dhamma Schools, Bhikku Education, Pirivenas and Buddhist Universities.
- Channa Jayasumana - State Minister of Pharmaceutical Production, Supply and Regulation.
- Sisira Jayakody - State Minister of Promotion of Indigenous Medicine, Development of Rural Ayurvedic Hospitals and Community Health.
- Piyankara Jayaratne - State Minister of Foreign Employment Promotions and Market Diversification.
- Wimalaweera Dissanayake - State Minister of Wildlife Conservation Protection Programmes including Electric Fence and Ditch Construction and Re-Forestation and Wildlife Resources Development.
- Shasheendra Rajapaksa - State Minister of Paddy and Cereals, Organic Food, Vegetables, Fruits, Chilies, Onions and Potatoes, Seed Production and High Tech Agriculture.
- Mohan De Silva - State Minister of Regulation of Fertilizer Production and Supply, Use of Chemical Fertilizers and Pesticides.
- D. B. Herath - State Minister of Livestock and Farm Promotion and Dairy and Eggs Related Industries.
- Siripala Gamlath - State Minister of Development of Common Infrastructure Facilities of Settlements and Canals in Mahaweli Zones.
- Anuradha Jayaratne - State Minister of Development of Rural Paddy Fields and Associated Tanks, Reservoirs and Irrigation.
- Roshan Ranasinghe - State Minister of Land Management Affairs, State Business Lands and Property Development.
- Vijitha Berugoda -State Minister of Women and Child Affairs.
- Roshan Ranasinghe - State Minister of Mahaweli Development
- Kanchana Wijesekera - State Minister of Ornamental Fish, Freshwater Fish and Shrimp Farming Development, Multi-day Fishing and Fish Export.
- Kanaka Herath - State Minister of Company Establishment Reforms, Tea Estate Crops, Tea Factory Modernization and Tea Export Diversification.
- Arundika Fernando - State Minister of Coconut, Fishtail Palm, Palmyra and Rubber Product Promotion and Allied Industrial Production and Export Diversification.
- Janaka Wakkumbra - State Minister of Development of Sugarcane, Maize, Cashew, Pepper, Cinnamon, Cloves, Betel Production and Promotion of Allied Products and Export.
- Sanath Nishantha - State Minister of Development of Rural and Regional Drinking Water Supply Projects.
- Duminda Dissanake - State Minister of Solar, Wind, Grid Power Generation Projects Development.
- Jayantha Samaraweera - State Minister of Warehouse Facilities, Container Yards, Port Supply Facilities and Boats and Shipping Industry Development.
- Nimal Lansa - State Minister of Rural Road and Other Infrastructural Facilities.
- Dilum Amunugama - State Minister of Vehicle Regulation, Bus Transport Services and Carriages and Automotive Industries.
- Thenuka Vidanagamage - State Minister of Rural and School Sports Infrastructure Promotion.
- D. V. Chanaka - State Minister of Aviation and Export Zones.
- Lasantha Alagiyawanna - State Minister of Cooperative Services, Marketing Development and Consumer Protection.
- Dayasiri Jayasekara - State Minister of Batik, Handloom Fabrics and Local Apparel Products.
- Lohan Ratwatte - State Minister of Gem and Jewelry Related Industries.
- Prasanna Ranaweera - State Minister of Cane, Brass, Clay Furniture and Rural Industry Promotion.
- Sadasivam Viyalendran - State Minister of Professional Development of Postal Services and Mass Media.
