= Niroshan =

Charles Niroshan may refer to

- Niroshan Bandaratilleke, Sri Lankan cricketer
- Niroshan Dickwella, Sri Lankan cricketer
- Niroshan Mani, Indian footballer
- Niroshan Illeperuma, actor
- Niroshan Perera, Sri Lankan politician
- Niroshan Premaratne, Sri Lankan politician
- Niroshan Wijekoon, Sri Lanka badminton player
- Chaminda Niroshan, Sri Lankan cricketer
