= Chaminda =

Chaminda is a given name. Notable people with the name include:

- Chaminda Darman (born 1978), Sri Lankan cricketer
- Chaminda Mendis (born 1968), Sri Lankan cricketer
- Chaminda Niroshan, Sri Lankan cricketer
- Chaminda Ruwan (born 1979), Sri Lankan born cricketer
- Chaminda Ruwan Yakandawala (1971–2006), Sri Lankan soldier
- Chaminda Vaas (born 1974), Sri Lankan cricketer
- Chaminda Vidanapathirana (born 1983), Sri Lankan cricketer
- Jude Chaminda (born 1973), Sri Lankan born cricketer
