= Wijemanne =

Wijemanne is a surname. Notable people with the surname include:

- A. F. Wijemanne, Sri Lankan lawyer
- Livy Wijemanne (1917–2002), Sri Lankan radio personality
- Thusitha Wijemanne, Sri Lankan politician
- V. L. Wijemanne (1909–1990), Sri Lankan lawyer
- Sandun Wijemanne Nissanka (born 1998), Sri Lankan-American record industry executive
