= Priyantha =

Priyantha may refer to

- Ashoka Priyantha, Sri Lankan politician
- Janaka Priyantha Bandara, Sri Lankan politician
- Priyantha Jayawardena, judge
- Priyantha Perera - Commander of Sri Lanka Navy from 2022-2024
- Nalin Priyantha, Sri Lankan athlete
