= Nalaka =

Nalaka may refer to

- Nalaka, village near Rajgriha, India; birthplace of Sariputra, one of the chief male disciples of Gautama Buddha
- Nalaka, disciple of The Buddha, son of the ancient Indian ascetic Asita (who predicted that Siddhartha Gautama would become The Buddha)
- Nalaka Godahewa, Chairman of Securities Exchange Commission in Sri Lanka
- Nalaka Gunawardene, writer and journalist
- Nalaka Kolonne, Sri Lankan politician
- Nalaka Kottegoda (born 1979), Sri Lankan politician
- Nalaka Roshan (born 1993), Sri Lankan international footballer
- Nalaka Vithanage, Sri Lankan director
- Nalaka, Florida, a town developed around the turpentine industry that died out once the trees were gone
