= Indunil =

Indunil is a Sinhalese given name and surname. Notable people with the name include:

- Indunil Herath (born 1993), Sri Lankan middle-distance runner
- Thushara Indunil (born 1968), Sri Lankan politician
