= Sriyani =

Sriyani may refer to

- Sriyani Amarasena, Sri Lankan actress
- Sriyani Dhammika Menike, Sri Lankan high jumper
- Sriyani Kulawansa, Sri Lankan hurdler
- Sriyani Wijewickrama, Sri Lankan politician
