= Premaratne =

Premaratne may refer to:

- Bogoda Premaratne, Sri Lankan educator.
- H. D. Premaratne, Sri Lankan Director
- L. B. T. Premaratne, Solicitor General of Ceylon
- Nilanka Premaratne, Sri Lankan cricketer
- Nilantha Premaratne, Sri Lankan army general and 26th Commander of the Army
- Niroshan Premaratne, Sri Lankan politician
- P. L. D. Premaratne, Solicitor General of Ceylon
- Rangana Premaratne, actor
