= Jayathilake =

Jayathilake is a Sinhalese family name from Sri Lanka. In Sinhalese it is "ජයතිලක". Other ways to write this surname in romanized letters are "Jayatilleka" and "Jayatilake" Notable people with the surname include:

- Amaranath Jayathilake (1937–2013), Sri Lankan journalist
- Chathuranga Jayathilake (born 1991), Sri Lankan cricketer
- C. L. V. Jayathilake, Sri Lankan engineer
- Malith Jayathilake, Sri Lankan politician
- Ransilu Jayathilake (born 1987), Sri Lankan powerlifter
- Supeshala Jayathilake (born 1995), Sri Lankan cricketer
