= Thusitha =

Thusitha is a surname. Notable people with the surname include:

- Thusitha Jayasundera (born 1971), Sri Lankan actress
- Thusitha Laknath (born 1983), Sri Lankan actor
- Thusitha Wijemanne, Sri Lankan politician
- Thusitha Gajanayake, Sri Lankan Scientist
