= M. L. A. M. Hizbullah =

Sri Lankan politician (born 1963)

Hon. M. L. A. M. Hizbullah MP MPC
- எம்.எல்.ஏ.எம். ஹிஸ்புல்லாஹ் M. L. A. M. හිස්බුල්ලා
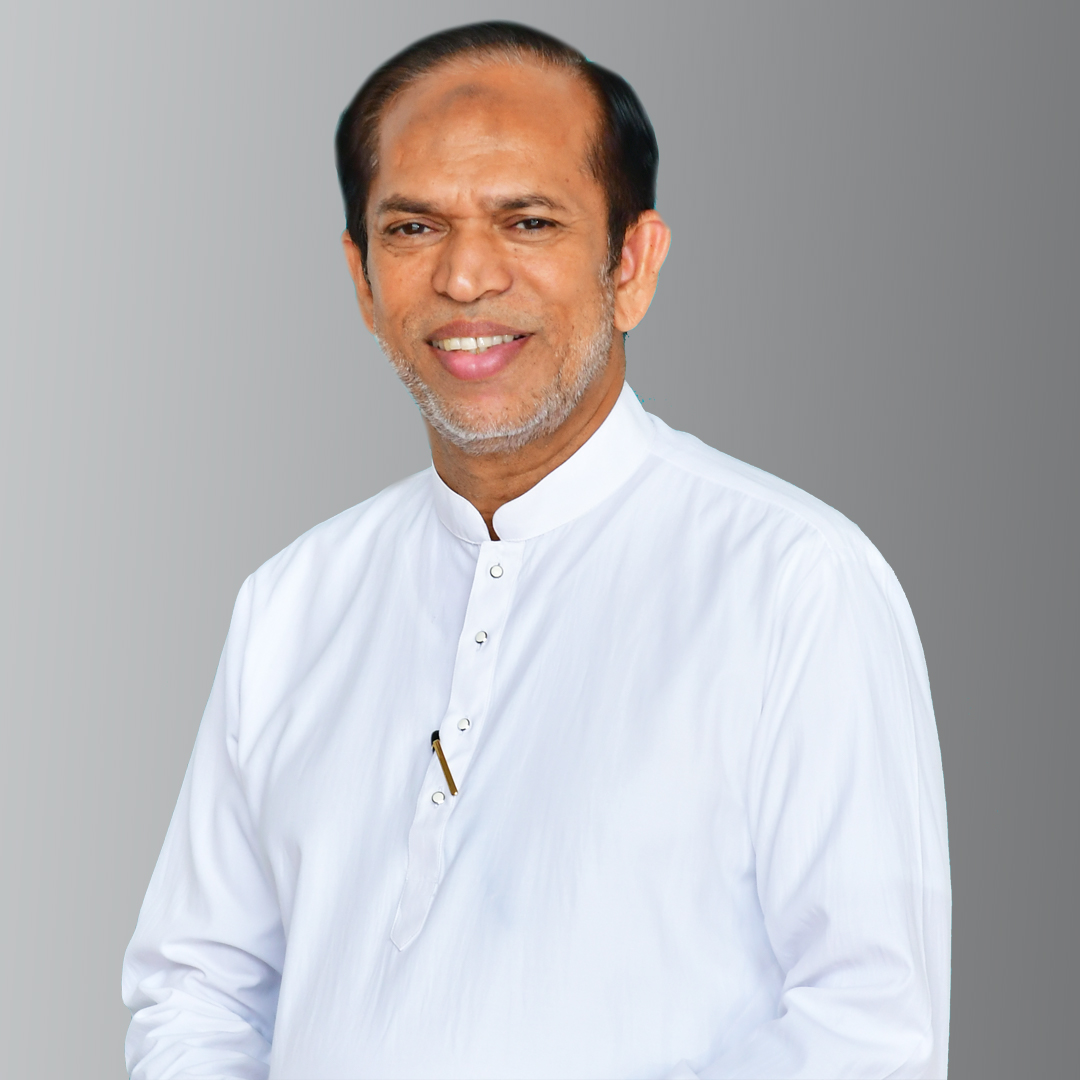
- Hizbullah in 2024

Chairman of Sri Lanka Muslim Congress
- Incumbent
- Assumed office 2026

4th Governor of Eastern Province
- In office 3 January 2019 – 3 June 2019
- Preceded by: Rohitha Bogollagama
- Succeeded by: Shan Wijayalal De Silva
Ministerial posts
Minister
of City Planning and Water Supply
In office
9 November 2018 – 15 December 2018
State Minister
of Highways and Road Development
In office
1 November 2018 – 15 December 2018
In office
2 May 2018 – 26 October 2018
State Minister
of Rehabilitation and Resettlement
In office
9 September 2015 – 2 May 2018
Deputy minister (Sri Lanka)
of Economic Development
In office
28 January 2013 – 9 January 2015
Deputy Minister
of Child Development & Woman’s Affairs
In office
23 April 2010 – 27 January 2013
Parliamentary offices
Member of the Parliament of Sri Lanka
Incumbent
Assumed office 21 November 2024
| Constituency | Batticaloa District |
Member of the Parliament of Sri Lanka
In office 2015 – 4 January 2019
| Constituency | National List |
In office 2010–2015
| Constituency | Batticaloa District |
In office 2001–2004
| Constituency | Batticaloa District |
In office 1989 – 2000
Provincial offices
| Constituency | Batticaloa District |
Health Minister of Eastern Province, Sri Lanka
In office 2008–2010
Member of the Eastern Provincial Council
In office 2008–2010
| Succeeded by | K. L. M. Fareed |
| Constituency | Batticaloa District |
Member of the North Eastern Provincial Council
In office 1988–1989
- Constituency: Batticaloa District

Personal details
- Born: 2 February 1963 (age 63)
- Citizenship: Sri Lankan
- Party: Sri Lanka Muslim Congress (1988–2000, 2005–2008, since 2023)
- Other political affiliations: People's Alliance (2000–2004); United People's Freedom Alliance (2004–2019); All Ceylon Makkal Congress (2008–2014); United Peace Alliance (2020–2023)
- Education: University of Peradeniya; University of Madras

Mahamood Lebbe Alim Mohamed Hizbullah (born 2 February 1963) is a Sri Lankan politician, MP and state minister. He was a minor presidential candidate in the 2019 presidential elections.

== Early life ==
Hizbullah was born on 2 February 1963. He has a General Arts Qualification (GAQ) from the University of Peradeniya, and an M.A. degree from the University of Madras.

== Career ==
Hizbullah was a member of Kattankudy Divisional Council. He was elected to the North Eastern Provincial Council at the 1988 provincial council election.

Hizbullah contested the 1989 parliamentary election as a candidate of the Sri Lanka Muslim Congress (SLMC) in the Batticaloa District. He was elected and entered Parliament. He was re-elected in 1994, and was appointed Deputy Minister of Media and Deputy Minister of Post and Telecommunication. He failed to win re-election in 2000. He was then appointed chairman of the state-owned National Water Supply and Drainage Board.

In 2000, SLMC leader M. H. M. Ashraff was on the verge of suspending Hizbullah from the party, but in September that year, Ashraff was killed in a helicopter crash. In the ensuing power struggle, Hizbullah unsuccessfully attempted to attain leadership of the SLMC. Rauff Hakeem became leader of the SLMC whilst Hizbullah became deputy leader of the National Unity Alliance, which was led by Ashraff's widow Ferial Ashraff.

Hizbullah contested the 2001 parliamentary election as a candidate of the People's Alliance in the Batticaloa District. He was elected and re-entered Parliament. He contested the 2004 parliamentary election as a United People's Freedom Alliance (UPFA) candidate, but the UPFA failed to win any seats in the Batticaloa District.

In 2004 and 2005, Hizbullah was chairman of the state-owned Airport and Aviation Services Limited, during which time he and his wife Sithy Rameeza Sahabdeen were alleged to have defrauded Rs. 67.5 million from the company. Hizbullah returned to the SLMC in 2005 before defecting again in 2008 to the All Ceylon Makkal Congress, a constituent party of the UPFA.

Hizbullah contested in the 2008 provincial council election as one of the UPFA's candidates in the Batticaloa District and was elected to the Eastern Provincial Council. Hizbullah sought for the post of Chief Minister but the UPFA gave the position to LTTE defector Pillayan (S. Chandrakanthan) instead. Hizbullah was instead appointed Minister for Health and Indigenous Medicine, Social Welfare, Probation and Childcare Services, Women's Affairs, Youth Affairs, Sports, Information Technology Education, Co-operative Development, Food Supply and Distribution.

Hizbullah contested the 2010 parliamentary election as one of the UPFA's candidates in the Batticaloa District. He was elected and re-entered Parliament. Following the election, he was appointed as Deputy Minister of Child Development and Women's Affairs. In January 2013 he was appointed Deputy Minister of Economic Development.

Hizbullah's party, the ACMC, left the UPFA in December 2014 to support common opposition candidate Maithripala Sirisena at the 2015 presidential election. Hizbullah chose to remain with the UPFA and support its leader Mahinda Rajapaksa in the election. Hizbullah was one of the UPFA's candidates in Batticaloa District in the 2015 parliamentary election but the UPFA failed to win any seats in the district. However, after the election he was appointed as a UPFA National List MP in the Sri Lankan Parliament. He was sworn in as State Minister of Resettlement and Rehabilitation on 9 September 2015.

In 2018, Hizbullah was appointed as the State Minister of Highways and Road Development. Later that year, he was sworn in as Cabinet Minister of City Planning and Water Supply. In 2019, he made history by being appointed as the first Muslim Governor of the Eastern Province.

In 2020, Hizbullah joined the United Peace Alliance, led by former minister and former chairman of the Sri Lanka Muslim Congress, Basheer Segu Dawood, and unsuccessfully contested the 2020 parliamentary election representing Batticaloa. In 2023, after a 16-year period, Hizbullah returned to the Sri Lanka Muslim Congress and was appointed Deputy Leader of the party. In 2024, he contested the parliamentary election under the SLMC’s "tree" symbol in the Batticaloa District and was successfully elected.

== Controversies ==
Hizbullah has been accused of supporting Islamic extremists in the Eastern Province and abusing his powers. In the aftermath of the 2019 Sri Lanka Easter Bombings, opposition to Hizbullah intensified with hartals in Trincomalee, Kantale, Serunuwara and Morawewa with some violence being reported. Complaints against him and Rishad Bathiudeen were also lodged to the CID. Islamist extremists, including those in support of the National Thowheeth Jama'ath, began replacing name boards in the Eastern Province with those in Arabic while out of the 72 acres of archaeological land that belonged to the Muhudu Maha Vihara, 55 acres were forcibly acquired by Muslim extremists while courts in the Eastern Province do not accept cases filled in Sinhala. The Tamil National Alliance also demanded President Maithripala Sirisena to stop protecting Hizbullah and asked him to resign. Despite heavy protests and criticism, Sirisena appointed him as Co-chairman of the districts' coordinating committees in Trincomalee, Batticaloa and Ampara on 29 May to "expedite development".

CCTV videos of Hizbullah meeting with a group of Saudi nationals on the day after the bombings despite the curfew imposed were released to the public. The CID began investigations into the meeting. Further his role in the Batticaloa Campus also called the "Sharia Campus" which was being built with Saudi Arabian funds were also questioned. Hizbullah denied the institute will teach Sharia law. However according to letters sent to the Higher Education Ministry five academic cadre positions were allocated for the Sharia and Islamic Studies stream. Further the institute's website also claimed that Sharia Law was a subject but the website later removed mentions of Sharia.

On 31 May Athuraliye Rathana Thera began a hunger protest requesting the removal of Hizbullah and several other politicians like Rishad Bathiudeen who are accused of having ties to Islam extremists. There were several protests by Sinhala and Tamil as well as Hindu, Christian and Muslim figures and organisations in support of the thera including by relatives of the bomb blasts.

The protests were also supported by the Mahanayaka theras and Cardinal Malcolm Ranjith also visited the fasting Thera. Hizbullah initially refused to resign without "consulting his people" but later resigned alongside Western Province governor Azath Sally.

On 10 June Hizbullah claimed "Muslims should live with their heads up. I wish to make it clear that only in this country that we are minorities, but in this whole world, we are in a majority. Till we find a solution to our problems, we should be united. At the time of the elections, we must reveal our stance,". Further his speech was marked with inflammatory language. His speech was condemned by Prime Minister Ranil Wickremesinghe who claimed that everybody must identify as Sri Lankans.

The Federation of Kattankudy Mosques and Institutions accused Hizbullah of encouraging the Arabization of Sri Lankan Muslims when its representative testified before the Parliament Select Committee (PSC) appointed to probe Easter Sunday attack.

When questioned by the PSC Hizbullah accepted that he did meet Zahran Hashim, leader of the NTJ in the past but claimed that the two later had falling out resulting in Zahran's followers attacking his supporters. He also accepted that he met Zahran before the 2015 election but also revealed that other candidates had also met him. However Sufi leaders of Kattankudy revealed that Hizbullah was among the Muslim politicians who pledged their support to the NTJ and its leader despite the group actively inciting violence against Sufis.

== Electoral history ==
Electoral history of M. L. A. M. Hizbullah
| Election | Constituency | Party | Alliance | Votes | Result |
|---|---|---|---|---|---|
| 1988 provincial | Batticaloa | SLMC | | | Elected |
| 1989 parliamentary | Batticaloa | SLMC | | 15,832 | Elected |
| 1994 parliamentary | Batticaloa | SLMC | | 12,583 | Elected |
| 2001 parliamentary | Batticaloa | SLFP | PA | 19,785 | Elected |
| 2004 parliamentary | Batticaloa | SLFP | UPFA | 23,813 | Not elected |
| 2008 provincial | Batticaloa | ACMC | UPFA | | Elected |
| 2010 parliamentary | Batticaloa | ACMC | UPFA | 22,256 | Elected |
| 2015 parliamentary | Batticaloa | | UPFA | | Not elected |
| 2019 presidential | Sri Lanka | Ind | | 38,814 | Not elected |
| 2020 parliamentary | Batticaloa | UPA | | | Not elected |
| 2024 parliamentary | Batticaloa | SLMC | | 32,410 | Elected |
