= Ministry of Telecommunication, Digital Infrastructure and Foreign Employment =

Government ministry of Sri Lanka

Ministry of Information Technology

Ministry overview
- Jurisdiction: Government of Sri Lanka
- Headquarters: 79/1 5th Lane, Colombo; 6°54′19.90″N 79°51′20.50″E
- Annual budget: Rs. 0.1 billion (2018, recurrent); Rs. 2 billion (2018, capital)
- Minister responsible: Harin Fernando, Minister of Telecommunication, Digital Infrastructure and Foreign Employment
- Deputy Minister responsible: Tharanath Basnayake, Deputy Minister of Telecommunication and Digital Infrastructure
- Ministry executive: Nihal Somaweera, Wasantha Deshapriya
- Child agencies: Department of Telecommunication; Information and Communication Technology Agency; Sri Lanka Telecom
- Website: mtdi.gov.lk

The Ministry of Telecommunication, Digital Infrastructure and Foreign Employment is the central government ministry of Sri Lanka responsible for telecommunication and digital infrastructure. The ministry is responsible for formulating and implementing national policy on telecommunication and digital infrastructure and other subjects which come under its purview. The current Minister of Telecommunication, Digital Infrastructure and Foreign Employment and Deputy Minister of Telecommunication and Digital Infrastructure are Harin Fernando and Tharanath Basnayake respectively. The ministry's secretary is Wasantha Deshapriya.

== Ministers ==
The Minister of Telecommunication, Digital Infrastructure and Foreign Employment is a member of the Cabinet of Sri Lanka.

Ministers of Telecommunication
Name	Portrait	Party	Took office	Left office	Head of government	Ministerial title	Refs
Mohamed Macan Markar			1931	1936		Minister of Communications and Works	
John Kotelawala			1936	1945		Minister of Communications and Works	
C. Sittampalam		Independent	26 September 1947		D. S. Senanayake	Minister of Posts and Telecommunication	
C. Sittampalam		Independent		1952	Dudley Senanayake	Minister of Posts and Telecommunication	
Mahanama Samaraweera		Sri Lanka Freedom Party	28 May 1963		Sirimavo Bandaranaike	Minister of Communications	
Anil Moonesinghe		Lanka Sama Samaja Party	11 June 1964		Sirimavo Bandaranaike	Minister of Communications	
Montague Jayawickrama		United National Party			Dudley Senanayake	Minister of Public Works, Posts and Telecommunications	
Leslie Goonewardene		Lanka Sama Samaja Party	31 May 1970	1977	Sirimavo Bandaranaike	Minister of Posts and Telecommunications	
Shelton Jayasinghe		United National Party	23 July 1977		J. R. Jayewardene	Minister of Posts and Telecommunications	
D. B. Wijetunga		United National Party			J. R. Jayewardene	Minister of Posts and Telecommunications	
Alick Aluwihare		United National Party	18 February 1989	14 March 1991	Ranasinghe Premadasa	Minister of Posts and Telecommunications	
A. M. S. Adhikari		United National Party	14 March 1991		Ranasinghe Premadasa	Minister of Posts and Telecommunications	
Mangala Samaraweera		Sri Lanka Freedom Party	19 August 1994		D. B. Wijetunga	Minister of Posts and Telecommunications	
Nimal Siripala de Silva		Sri Lanka Freedom Party	19 October 2000		Chandrika Kumaratunga	Minister of Posts and Telecommunications	
Indika Gunawardena		Sri Lanka Freedom Party	14 September 2001		Chandrika Kumaratunga	Minister of Posts and Telecommunications	
D. M. Jayaratne		Sri Lanka Freedom Party	10 April 2004		Chandrika Kumaratunga	Minister of Post, Telecommunications and Udarata Development	
D. M. Jayaratne		Sri Lanka Freedom Party	23 November 2005		Mahinda Rajapaksa	Minister of Posts and Telecommunication	
Rauff Hakeem		Sri Lanka Muslim Congress	28 January 2007	December 2007	Mahinda Rajapaksa	Minister of Posts and Telecommunication	
Jeewan Kumaranatunga		Sri Lanka Freedom Party	23 April 2010		Mahinda Rajapaksa	Minister of Posts and Telecommunication	
Ranjith Siyambalapitiya		Sri Lanka Freedom Party	22 November 2010		Mahinda Rajapaksa	Minister of Telecommunication and Information Technology	
Harin Fernando		United National Party	4 September 2015	25 February 2018	Maithripala Sirisena	Minister of Telecommunication and Digital Infrastructure	
Harin Fernando		United National Party	25 February 2018		Maithripala Sirisena	Minister of Telecommunication, Digital Infrastructure and Foreign Employment	

== Secretaries ==
Telecommunication Secretaries
Name	Took office	Left office	Title	Refs
Asoka Jayasekara	25 April 2010		Posts and Telecommunication Secretary	
N. A. Athukoral	22 November 2010		Telecommunication and Information Technology Secretary	
Wasantha Deshapriya	11 September 2015		Telecommunication and Digital Infrastructure Secretary	
