= Athuraliye Rathana Thera =

Sri Lankan politician

Hon. Athuraliye Rathana Thera
- අතුරලියේ රතන அதுரலியே ரத்தன தேரர்
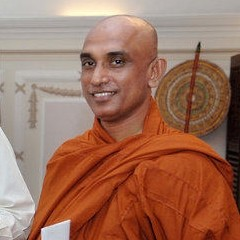

Member of Parliament for National List
- In office 5 January 2021 – 24 September 2024
- In office 1 September 2015 – 3 March 2020

Member of Parliament for Gampaha District
- In office 22 April 2010 – 26 June 2015

Member of Parliament for Kalutara District
- In office 22 April 2004 – 9 February 2010

Personal details
- Born: Ranjith Welikanda; 5 October 1962 (age 64) Matara, Sri Lanka
- Party: Jathika Hela Urumaya (2004–2017); Independent (2017–2020); Our Power of People's Party (since 2020)
- Other political affiliations: United National Front for Good Governance (2015–2018); United People's Freedom Alliance (2018–2019)
- Parents: Peirishamy Welikanda (father); Ceciliyana Halgamuwa (mother)
- Education: University of Peradeniya
- Occupation: Politician and Social Activist
- Profession: Buddhist Clergy

Venerable Athuraliye Rathana Thera (Sinhala: අතුරලියේ රතන හිමි; born 5 October 1962), is a Sri Lankan Bhikkhu politician and former Member of Parliament.

== Personal life ==
He was born on 5 October 1962 in Athuraliya in the Matara District, as Ranjith Welikanda the youngest in a family with seven siblings. His father Peirishamy Welikanda did gem testing as a profession. His mother Ceciliyana Halgamuwa was a housewife. He got his basic education from Athuraliya Maha Vidyalaya up to grade 8. On 11 May 1976, at the age of fourteen, he became a Buddhist monk, taking on the name, Athuraliye Rathana. He was ordained to the Saddhammawansa Nikaya, a pioneer of the Amarapura Nikaya, by Wadiye Sumangala Thera and Polathugoda Gnaanaloka Thera.

== As a Buddhist monk ==
He received Buddhist education from Jayasumana Pirivena at Matara and at Shishyalankara Pirivena at Ambalangoda. He got his higher education at the Pinnawatta Pirivena, Panadura. After passing the exam he entered University of Peradeniya, obtained his Bachelor of Arts (Hons) degree in philosophy, and later completed his Master of Arts degree in philosophy. He also studied scriptures of Theravada, Mahayana and Vajrayana extensively. Then he wrote the book which contained a comparative study upon the differences between the philosophical differences of Mahayana and Theravada traditions. He also wrote the book with an annotation of the Maha Satipattana Sutta.

The book called "Buddha in You" explains the essence of the Dharma. He authored another book called, "Buddhism for Sustainability" which explains how the Buddhist way of life can be the alternative to the modern materialistic lifestyle with an overconsumption that has given rise to many forms of crisis.

In 2001, he delivered a special lecture on "Modern environmental crisis and solutions through the Buddhist philosophy" at the International Conference at the University of Bath in England, held in Tripura, India. He also delivered a keynote address at the International Network of Engaged Buddhists (INEB) conference held in Taiwan in 2020.

== Political career ==
When he was a university student he was a pioneer activist in student's movements. After obtaining degree in 1994, he gave leadership to an active people movement called the "Janatha Mithuro" (The Friends of People) to defeat the then UNP government.

Before entering politics, he made extensive work on Western and Eastern philosophical ideas. He has especially studied Marxist philosophy. He participated UN summit, representing the Government of Sri Lanka on multiple occasions. Once, he delivered a speech, representing the Buddhist representatives at the Inter-Religious Federation conference, which was chaired by the President of France, and was held along with the summit. At that conference, he presented a special report with the theme, "How to achieve the goals of the United Nations?".

He gave the leadership to build the nationalist Bhikku movement called Jathika Sangha Sammelanaya (National Congress of Buddhist Clergy) which played an immense role in the political struggle against the Tamil independence movement and the genocide against Sri Lankan Tamils. Along with Sihala Urumaya and National Movement Against Terrorism, Rathana Thera build a nationalist movement called Patriotic Nationalist Front and started addressing the nationalist sentiments, even though it violates the Buddha's teachings.

Rathana was a founding member of the Jathika Hela Urumaya (JHU) in February 2004, a Sinhala Buddhist nationalist party in Sri Lanka where he became the National Organiser of that party. In a short period of campaign JHU could win about 550,000 votes and the party secured 9 seats in the parliament at 2004 parliamentary election. Then he was selected as a parliamentarian from Gampaha district and he was given the responsibility to act as the parliamentary team leader of the party. JHU played a major role in defeating the pseudo-anti-war pacifistic sentiments that were organised by certain sections of the government through programs such as "Sudu Nelum" and "Thavalam". Rathana Thera played a key role in the JHU within the parliament and outside the parliament. He was a member of the parliamentary main committee.

In 2005, with the help of JHU, Mahinda Rajapaksa secure a narrow victory over Ranil Wickramasinghe in the 2005 presidential election. In 2015, Rathana and the JHU played a major role in defeating Mahinda Rajapaksa and making Maithripala Sirisena President. He represented many advisory committees. In the 2015 general election, Rathana Thera was a national list nominee of the United People’s Freedom Alliance. He was appointed to the parliament after United National Party won the election.

On 19 March 2019, he started a hunger strike in front of the Temple of the Tooth. It was initiated for being asked to step down the posts of the Minister Rishad Bathiudeen, Governor of the Western Province Azath Salley and Governor of the Eastern Province M. L. A. M. Hizbullah. Then on 31 June 2019, Forty monks, including Rathana Thera, began a deadly hunger strike at the Temple of the Tooth for the same course. In the fourth day of fast he became hungry, and he ended his hunger strike after officially announcing the resignation of Azath Salley and M. L. A. M. Hizbullah from their posts. He was rushed to hospital and treated at the Surgical Intensive Care Unit of the Kandy General Hospital.

On 19 June 2019, Rathana Thera lodged a written complaint with Acting IGP C.D. Wickremaratne against the Criminal Investigations Department where he has charged that the CID has failed to carry out a proper investigation into the allegations leveled against Dr. Shafi Shihabdeen from Kurunegala.

On 18 December 2020, Rathana Thera was announced as the National List seat representative won by Our People's Party at the 2020 Sri Lankan parliamentary election. At the election, OPP polled 67,758 votes as a percentage of 0.58% and won one seat. On 5 January 2021, he sworn as the National List Member of Parliament and has decided to take a seat in the opposition party.

== Humanitarian efforts ==
During the civil war period in 2005, Rathana Thera mostly lived in the threatened areas, helping the affected people and encouraging the armed forces. During Maithripala Sirisena government, Rathana Thera initiated a program to popularise renewable energy and sustainable development.

He initiated another serious project to reverse the harmful farming system, in which the pesticides, weedicides and chemical fertilisers are abundantly used in the process of farming, to the carbonic farming in which harmful poisonous substances are not used. After a long struggle Rathana Thera was successful in banning glyphosate and promoting carbonic farming as a national policy.

== Controversies and criticism ==
=== Alleged involvement in abduction and detention ===
On 18 August 2025, the Colombo Magistrate’s Court issued an arrest warrant for former Member of Parliament Ven. Athuraliye Rathana Thera in connection with the alleged abduction of Ven. Wedinigama Wimalatissa Thera, General Secretary of the Ape Janabala Party. The warrant was issued following a submission by the Colombo Crimes Division (CCD), according to Police Media Spokesman, Assistant Superintendent of Police F. U. Wootler.

The alleged abduction reportedly occurred to prevent Wimalatissa Thera from being appointed to the party’s National List parliamentary seat.

According to reports, CCD officers attempted to arrest Rathana Thera at his residence, Sandaham Sevana in Rajagiriya, on 7 August 2025; however, he was not present and his mobile phone was reportedly switched off.

Further investigations revealed that former President Gotabaya Rajapaksa and former Senior DIG Deshabandu Tennakoon were scheduled to be questioned in connection with the incident. Reports suggest that Tennakoon was allegedly implicated in both the abduction and the manipulation of the National List MP appointment.

On 29 August 2025, Rathana Thera was arrested after surrendering to the court and was ordered by the Nugegoda Magistrate to be remanded until 12 September, in connection with allegations of abducting and detaining a person in 2020. He was granted bail by the court on 12 September.

== See also ==
- Maduluwawe Sobitha Thera
