= Jayatilleka =

Jayatilleka is a Sinhalese family name from Sri Lanka. In Sinhalese it is "ජයතිලක". Other ways to write this surname in romanized letters are "Jayathilake" and "Jayatilake". Notable people with the surname include:

- Bhathiya Jayatilleka (died 2000), Sri Lankan military officer
- Dayan Jayatilleka (born 1956), Sri Lankan academic, diplomat, writer, and politician
