= Vadivel Suresh =

Sri Lankan politician

Hon. Vadivel Suresh MP
- වඩිවේල් සුරේෂ් வடிவேல் சுரேஷ்
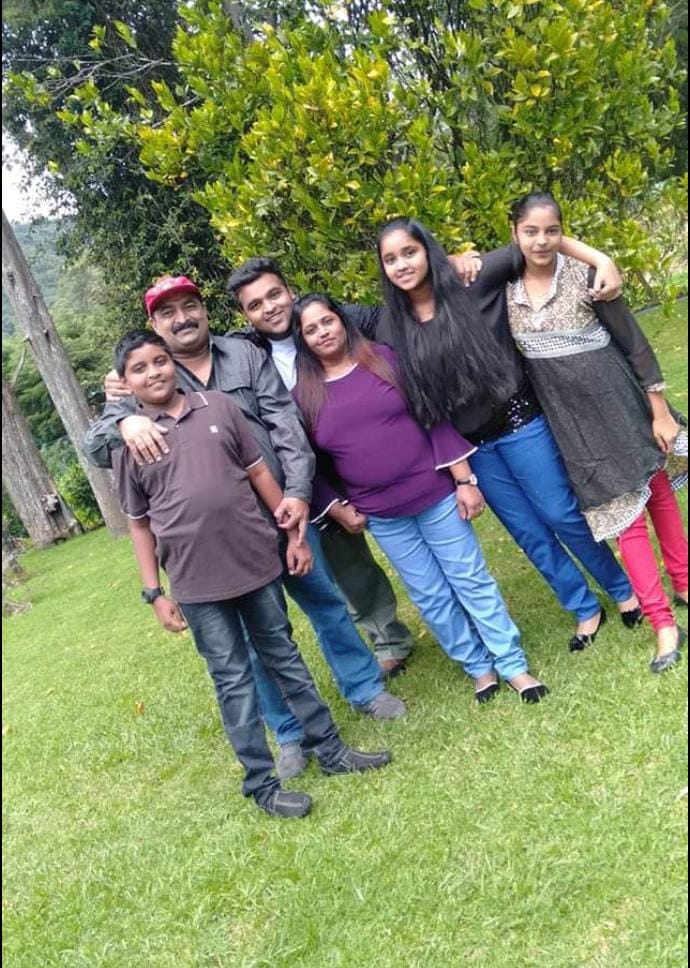

Deputy Minister of Health & Nutrition
- In office 2005–2007

Deputy Minister of Health
- In office 2007–2010

Member of Parliament for Badulla District
- Incumbent
- Assumed office 2015
- In office 2004–2010

Personal details
- Born: 12 May 1971 (age 55) Nawalapitiya
- Party: Samagi Jana Balawegaya
- Spouse: Daphney Vadivel Suresh (m.1997)
- Children: Shane Pratheesh Vadivel Suresh; Hashley Brinda Vadivel Suresh; Kevin Karan Vadivel Suresh; Kenne Kaviya Vadivel Suresh
- Occupation: General Secretary of Lanka Jathika Estate Workers Union
- Profession: Politician

Vadivel Suresh (or Wadivelu Suresh) is a Sri Lankan politician, and a member of the Parliament of Sri Lanka
