= Ananda Kumarasiri =

Sri Lankan politician

Hon. Ananda Kumarasiri MP

Deputy Speaker of the Parliament of Sri Lanka
- In office 5 June 2018 – 2 March 2020
- Preceded by: Thilanga Sumathipala
- Succeeded by: Ranjith Siyambalapitiya

Member of Parliament for Monaragala District
- In office 2015–2020

Personal details
- Born: Jayasundara Mudiyanselage Ananda Kumarasiri; March 25, 1954 (age 72)
- Party: United National Party
- Education: S. Thomas' College, Mount Lavinia
- Occupation: Attorney at law

Jayasundara Mudiyanselage Ananda Kumarasiri (born 25 March 1954) is a member of the United National Party and served as Deputy speaker and chairman of committees of the Parliament of Sri Lanka between 2018 and 2020. He is the son of late J M Kumaradasa, the first sitting member of parliament representing Wellawaya, who spearheaded the rapid development of the Monaragala District under then President J.R. Jayawardena. Hon Ananda Kumarasiri is currently the Member of Parliament for the Monaragala District.

Member of the 11th Parliament of Sri Lanka (2000–2001)

Member of the 12th Parliament of Sri Lanka (2001–2004)
