= All Ceylon Makkal Congress =

All Ceylon Makkal Congress அகில இலங்கை மக்கள் காங்கிரஸ் සමස්ත ලංකා මහජන කොංග්‍රසය
- Leader: Rishad Bathiudeen
- Chairperson: Ameer Ali
- Secretary-General: S. Subairdeen
- Founder: Rishad Bathiudeen
- Founded: 2005; 21 years ago
- Split from: Sri Lanka Muslim Congress
- National affiliation: Samagi Jana Balawegaya
- Parliament of Sri Lanka: 3 / 225
- Local Government: 60 / 7,842

Election symbol
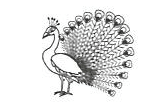
- Peacock

Website
- acmc.lk

The All Ceylon Makkal Congress (Tamil: அகில இலங்கை மக்கள் காங்கிரஸ், romanized: Akila Ilaṅkai Makkaḷ Kāṅkiras; Sinhala: සමස්ත ලංකා මහජන කොංග්‍රසය Samasta Lanka Mahajana Kongrasaya) is a registered political party in Sri Lanka. It was founded in 2005 by Rishad Bathiudeen. Since 2020, the All Ceylon Makkal Congress has been a constituent party of the Samagi Jana Balawegaya (SJB).

== History ==
Sri Lanka Muslim Congress (SLMC) member Rishad Bathiudeen was elected as a United National Front (UNF) MP, of which the SLMC was a member, at the 2001 parliamentary election. He was re-elected in the 2004 parliamentary election. However, the UNF was defeated by the newly formed United People's Freedom Alliance (UPFA) at the election. After the election, differences arose amongst the SLMC MPs as to whether they should join the UPFA government. SLMC MP Hussein Ahamed Bhaila defected to the UPFA on 18 May 2004. The SLMC suspended three MPs; M. N. Abdul Majeed, Rishad Bathiudeen and Bhaila; over their opposition to the leadership of Rauff Hakeem. The SLMC began disciplinary proceedings against the three MPs and party activist M. Inamullah. The quartet were expelled from the SLMC on 30 May 2004. The expelled MPs began legal proceedings to regain their SLMC membership, but on 30 July 2004 the Supreme Court announced that it had reserved judgement in the case.

On 30 October 2004, Abdul Majeed and Bathiudeen, together with another dissident SLMC MP, Ameer Ali, were appointed non-cabinet ministers in the UPFA government. Abdul Majeed, Ali and Bathiudeen were expelled from the SLMC on 23 March 2005 for accepting the ministerial positions. Another legal battle ensued and on 1 July 2005 the Supreme Court ruled that the three MPs expulsion from the SLMC was invalid. The dissident SLMC MPs founded a new political party, the All Ceylon Muslim Congress (ACMC), later in 2005. In January 2007 Bathiudeen was promoted to the cabinet whilst Bhaila became a deputy minister; Abdul Majeed and Ali remained non-cabinet ministers. Abdul Majeed rejoined the Sri Lanka Freedom Party in 2007.

Contesting under the UPPA, the ACMC secured three seats in Parliament — Bathiudeen, Hunais Farook and M. L. Alim Mohammad Hisbullah — at the 2010 parliamentary election. After the election Bathiudeen remained in the cabinet whilst Hisbullah became a deputy minister. The All Ceylon Muslim Congress was later renamed All Ceylon Makkal Congress (All Ceylon People's Congress). Farook left the UPFA and joined the opposition United National Party on 26 November 2014 in order to support common opposition candidate Maithripala Sirisena at the presidential election. Ali was appointed as a UPFA National List MP in Parliament in December 2014. The ACMC left the UPFA on 22 December 2014 to support Sirisena at the presidential election. Hisbullah however remained in the UPFA to support President Mahinda Rajapaksa. Rajapaksa dismissed Bathiudeen from the cabinet. After the presidential election, newly elected President Sirisena rewarded the ACMC by appointing Bathiudeen to the cabinet and Ali as a deputy minister.

In July 2015 the ACMC joined with other anti-Rajapaksa parties to form the United National Front for Good Governance (UNFGG) to contest the parliamentary election. Contesting on its own in one electoral district, Ampara District, the ACMC received 33,102 votes (0.30%), but failed to win any seats in Parliament. The ACMC did however secure five seats under the UNFGG - Ali, Bathiudeen, Abdul Rahuman Izak, M. A. M. Maharoof and M. H. M. Navavi. Bathiudeen and Ali remained cabinet and deputy ministers respectively after the election.
