= Thilanga Sumathipala =

Sri Lankan politician (born 1964)

Hon. Thilanga Sumathipala
- තිලංග සුමතිපාල திலங்க சுமதிபால

Deputy Speaker of the Parliament of Sri Lanka
- In office 1 September 2015 – 12 April 2018
- President: Maithripala Sirisena
- Prime Minister: Ranil Wickremesinghe
- Preceded by: Chandima Weerakkody
- Succeeded by: Ananda Kumarasiri

Member of Parliament for National List
- In office 2015–2020

Member of Parliament for Colombo District
- In office 2010–2015

Personal details
- Born: 3 May 1964 (age 62) Colombo, Sri Lanka
- Party: Sri Lanka Freedom Party
- Education: Nalanda College Colombo
- Occupation: Entrepreneur/Politics
- Profession: Entrepreneur
- Website: thilanga.lk

Uduwatuwage Janath Priya Thilanga Sumathipala (born 3 May 1964) (known as Thilanga Sumathipala) is a Sri Lankan businessman, politician, media proprietor, author, and veteran sports administrator. He has served as a member of parliament, deputy speaker of parliament, and held multiple ministerial portfolios. Throughout his career, he has spearheaded Sri Lanka's telecommunications, media, sports, and corporate sectors, while playing a pivotal role in infrastructure development, institutional reform, and corporate transformation.

== Academic background and education ==
Sumathipala completed his schooling at Nalanda College, Colombo, where he served as vice-captain of the first XI cricket team and was also a senior prefect.

He holds a Diploma in Photolithography and Graphic Reproduction from the London College of Printing (1983) and completed an Entrepreneurship Certificate through AOTS in Yokohama, Japan (1996). He subsequently completed senior executive education programmes at Harvard Business School (2005) and the John F. Kennedy School of Government at Harvard University (2006).

He also earned a Master of Public Administration and a Postgraduate Diploma in Public Management from the University of Colombo.

Sumathipala holds a PhD in International Relations from Paris American University. His doctoral research formed the foundation of his 2026 publication, An Island of Balance. He is currently pursuing a second PhD at the Faculty of Graduate Studies, University of Colombo.

== Career ==
=== Corporate Leadership and Conglomerate Operations ===
Sumathipala transformed his family's business into one of Sri Lanka's diversified conglomerates. He serves as Chairman of Sumathi Universal, the group's holding company, and chairs several specialised subsidiaries, including Sumathi Ventures, Napco, Sumathi Printers, Octagon Force, Octagon Engineering, Rabbit Solutions, Sumathi Universal Trading, SUKO, Thi, Sumathi Hospitality, and Sumi Shakthi.

He also served as the first chairman of Sri Lanka Telecom following its listing on the Colombo Stock Exchange. In addition, he served as chairman of Mobitel and Asia Capital PLC.

=== National telecommunications transformation ===
As executive chairman of Sri Lanka Telecom (SLT) and Mobitel from 2002 to 2004, Sumathipala led one of the most significant transformations in Sri Lanka's telecommunications sector.

Under his leadership, Sri Lanka Telecom was successfully listed on the Colombo Stock Exchange, marking a historic milestone in the company's evolution into a publicly listed enterprise. During this period, SLT also completed the full acquisition of Mobitel, making it a wholly owned subsidiary, while modernising its infrastructure from a TDMA network to a state-of-the-art GSM system.

He also led the successful issuance of a USD 100 million international listing, the first international listed instrument by a Sri Lankan company. The offering was oversubscribed and comprised approximately 1.9 billion shares.

=== Cricket Governance and International Representation ===
Sumathipala is one of Sri Lanka's most influential cricket administrators, having served multiple terms as President and Vice President of Sri Lanka Cricket (SLC).

He was first elected Vice President of the Board of Control for Cricket in Sri Lanka (BCCSL) in 1995 at the age of 30. At just 33 years old, he was elected President, becoming the youngest President in the organisation's history.

During his presidency in 2000, he conceptualized and oversaw the development of the Rangiri Dambulla International Cricket Stadium, which was completed in a record timeframe.

When re-elected in 2003, he initiated the transformation of the Board of Control for Cricket in Sri Lanka into Sri Lanka Cricket (SLC), introducing a modern corporate identity, including the organisation's new name and logo, officially launched in 2004.

Following his election as President again in 2016, he introduced the slogan 'One Team, One Nation' and established the Cricket Brain Centre to strengthen the strategic development of Sri Lankan cricket. During this period, he also played an instrumental role in relocating the headquarters of the Asian Cricket Council (ACC) to Colombo.

Internationally, Sumathipala served on the International Cricket Council (ICC) Board of Directors during the 1998–2000 and 2016–2017 terms. He also served as President of the Asian Cricket Council in 1998, 2000, and 2016.

==== Rangiri Dambulla International Cricket Stadium ====
One of the landmark achievements of Sumathipala's presidency of Sri Lanka Cricket was the conceptualisation and oversight of the development of the Rangiri Dambulla International Cricket Stadium.

Built in a record 167 days, the stadium was developed on a 24 ha (60 acres) site leased from the Rangiri Dambulla Temple. Overlooking the Dambulla Tank, the stadium has a seating capacity ranging from approximately 16,800 to 30,000 spectators. It hosted its inaugural One Day International between Sri Lanka and England in March 2001. Ownership of the stadium was permanently transferred to Sri Lanka Cricket in 2007.

==== Relocation of the Asian Cricket Council Headquarters ====
As president of the Asian Cricket Council (ACC), Sumathipala significantly reshaped regional cricket administration.

Following negotiations with the Sri Lankan Government, he secured favourable tax and structural concessions that enabled Sri Lanka to win a competitive bid against Dubai, Malaysia, Singapore, and Mauritius to permanently host the ACC headquarters.

The headquarters officially relocated to Maitland Crescent, Colombo 7, in 2016 and remained there until its relocation to Dubai in 2019.

== Public service and political career ==
Sumathipala entered public office in 2009 following his election to the Western Provincial Council. In 2010, he was elected to Parliament as a Member of Parliament for the Colombo District under the UPFA, serving until 2020.

He served as deputy minister of Skills Development and Vocational Training (2015), Deputy Speaker of Parliament (2015–2018), and state minister of Technology and Innovation (2019–2020). He also chaired the Parliamentary Select Committee on the United Nations 2030 Agenda for Sustainable Development and represented Sri Lanka at the United Nations High-Level Political Forum in New York in 2018. He later served as general secretary of the UPFA and vice president of the Sri Lanka Freedom Party (SLFP).

== Global and academic engagement ==
In 2014, Sumathipala was appointed distinguished professor of Leadership for Transformation at Keimyung University, South Korea. His international parliamentary engagements include serving on the Steering Committee of the Commonwealth Parliamentary Association (CPA), acting as general secretary of the Sri Lankan Chapter, and serving as deputy convener for Gender Equality within Parliamentarians for Global Action (PGA).

== Selected bibliography ==
- An Island of Balance (2026, ISBN 978-624-210-321-1)
- Wave Maker – The Thilanga Sumathipala Story (2024, ISBN 978-624-210-322-8)
- තරණය (2024, ISBN 978-955-9308-06-5)
- Thilanga at Parliament (ISBN 978-955-31-0512-7)
- පාර්ලිමේන්තුවේ තිලංග (ISBN 978-955-9308-03-4)
- The Buddhist Cultural Trails of Sri Lanka (ISBN 978-955-9308-05-8)

== Other works ==
In 1995, Sumathipala founded the Sumathi Awards, Sri Lanka's premier annual awards ceremony recognising excellence in television. He also serves as Founder and Chairman of the Thilanga Sumathipala Foundation and the Milina Matha charitable initiative.

== Personal life ==
Sumathipala married Samadara Wimalaratna in 1992, and they have three sons: Udhantha (1993), Dulantha (1997), and Sajantha (1999). His eldest son, Udhantha, married Yulie in 2022, and they welcomed their first child, Saurav, in 2025.Sumathipala is a practising Buddhist and resides in Colombo.
