= Shantha Abeysekara =

Sri Lankan politician

Hon. Shantha Abeysekara MP
- Incumbent
- Assumed office 4 September 2015
- President: Maithripala Sirisena
- Prime Minister: Ranil Wickremesinghe

Member of Parliament for Puttalam District
- Incumbent
- Assumed office 2015

Personal details
- Party: United National Party

Shantha Sisira Kumara Abeysekara as known as "Shantha Abeysekara" is a Sri Lankan politician and a member of the Parliament of Sri Lanka. He was elected from Puttalam District in 2015. He is a Member of the United National Party.

He was elected from the electorate of Chilaw of Puttalam District in August 2015. Also, he is a former Member of North Western Provincial Council and, has had been elected thrice in a row.
