= Charles Nirmalanathan =

Sri Lankan Tamil politician

Hon. Charles Nirmalanathan MP
- சார்ல்ஸ் நிர்மலநாதன் ඉරුදයනාදන් චාල්ස් නිර්මලනාදන්

Member of the Parliament of Sri Lanka
- Incumbent
- Assumed office 2015
- Constituency: Vanni District

Personal details
- Born: Iruthayanathan Charles Nirmalanathan; 24 November 1975 (age 50)
- Party: Illankai Tamil Arasu Kachchi
- Other political affiliations: Tamil National Alliance

Iruthayanathan Charles Nirmalanathan (Tamil: இருதயநாதன் சார்ல்ஸ் நிர்மலநாதன், romanized: Irutayanātaṉ Cārls Nirmalanātaṉ; born 24 November 1975) is a Sri Lankan Tamil politician and Member of Parliament.

== Early life ==
Nirmalanathan was born on 24 November 1975. He was educated at Velautham Maha Vidyalayam in Point Pedro.

== Career ==
Nirmalanathan is president of the Vavuniya Citizens Committee. He is a member of the Illankai Tamil Arasu Kachchi.

Nirmalanathan contested the 2013 provincial council election one of the Tamil National Alliance (TNA) electoral alliance's candidates in Mannar District but failed to get elected after coming 4th amongst the TNA candidates. He contested the 2015 parliamentary election as one of the TNA's candidates in Vanni District and was elected to the Parliament of Sri Lanka. He was re-elected at the 2020 parliamentary election.

== Electoral history ==
Electoral history of Charles Nirmalanathan
Election	Constituency	Party	Alliance	Votes	Result
2013 provincial	Mannar District	Illankai Tamil Arasu Kachchi	Tamil National Alliance	12,153	Not elected
2015 parliamentary	Vanni District	Illankai Tamil Arasu Kachchi	Tamil National Alliance	34,620	Elected
2020 parliamentary	Vanni District	Illankai Tamil Arasu Kachchi	Tamil National Alliance	25,668	Elected
