= Chaminda Darman =

Sri Lankan cricketer (born 1978)

Chaminda Darman (born December 1, 1978) was a Sri Lankan cricketer. He was a right-handed batsman and a leg-break bowler who played for Sri Lanka Navy. He was born in Avissawella.

Darman made a single first-class appearance for the side, during the 2000–01 season, against Nondescripts. From the tailend, he scored 3 runs in the first innings of the match, and 12 in the second innings. Sri Lanka Navy lost the match by an innings margin.

Darman bowled six overs in the match, conceding 43 runs.
