= M. H. M. Navavi =

Sri Lankan politician

Hon. M. H. M. Navavi MP

Member of Parliament for National List
- Incumbent
- Assumed office 2015

Personal details
- Born: 3 August 1946 (age 79)
- Party: All Ceylon Makkal Congress
- Other political affiliations: United National Front for Good Governance

Mohamed Hanifa Mohamed Navavi (born 3 August 1946) is a Sri Lankan politician and Member of Parliament.

Navavi was born on 3 August 1946. Navavi was one of the United National Front for Good Governance's (UNFGG) candidates in Puttalam District at the 2015 parliamentary election but failed to get elected. However, after the election he was appointed as a UNFGG National List MP in the Sri Lankan Parliament.

== Electoral history ==
Electoral history of M. H. M. Navavi
Election	Constituency	Party	Votes	Result
2015 parliamentary	Puttalam District	UNFGG		Not elected
