= Shanthi Sriskantharajah =

Sri Lankan politician

Hon. Shanthi Sriskantharajah MP

Member of Parliament for National List
- Incumbent
- Assumed office 2015

Personal details
- Born: 28 October 1965 (age 60)
- Party: Illankai Tamil Arasu Kachchi
- Other political affiliations: Tamil National Alliance
- Occupation: Civil servant
- Ethnicity: Sri Lankan Tamil

Shanthi Sriskantharajah (born 28 October 1965) is a Sri Lankan Tamil civil servant, politician and Member of Parliament.

== Early life ==
Sriskantharajah was born on 28 October 1965.

== Career ==
Sriskantharajah is a member of the Sri Lanka Administrative Service and a former Deputy Director of Planning. She is a member of the Illankai Tamil Arasu Kachchi (ITAK).

She was one of the Tamil National Alliance's (TNA) candidates in Vanni District at the 2015 parliamentary election but failed to get elected after coming fifth amongst the TNA candidates. However, after the election she was appointed as a TNA National List MP in Parliament.

== Electoral history ==
Electoral history of Shanthi Sriskantharajah
Election	Constituency	Party	Votes	Result
2015 parliamentary	Vanni District	TNA	18,081	Not elected
