= Chandima Weerakkody =

Sri Lankan politician

Hon. Chandima Weerakkody MP
- චන්දිම වීරක්කොඩි சந்திமா வீரக்கொடி

Minister of Skills Development and Vocational Training
- In office 21 May 2015 – 12 April 2018
- President: Maithripala Sirisena
- Prime Minister: Ranil Wickremesinghe
- Preceded by: Mahinda Samarasinghe
- Succeeded by: Vacant

Minister of Petroleum Resources Development
- In office 4 September 2015 – 21 May 2017
- President: Maithripala Sirisena
- Prime Minister: Ranil Wickremesinghe
- Preceded by: Anura Priyadharshana Yapa
- Succeeded by: Arjuna Ranatunga

Deputy speaker and chairman of committees of the Parliament of Sri Lanka
- In office 23 November 2010 – 26 June 2015
- Preceded by: Piyankara Jayaratne
- Succeeded by: Thilanga Sumathipala

Member of Parliament for Galle District
- Incumbent
- Assumed office 2009

Personal details
- Born: May 23, 1968 (age 58) Galle, Sri Lanka
- Party: United People's Freedom Alliance
- Spouse: Devika weerakkody
- Children: Vireign Weerakkody Devinya Weerakkody
- Education: St. Aloysius' College (Galle); Nalanda College, Colombo
- Occupation: Politics
- Profession: Lawyer
- Website: Official website

Chandima Weerakkody MP (born 23 May 1968) is a Member of Parliament representing the Galle District. He is currently a member of parliament representing Galle district.

Chandima was the former Cabinet Minister of Petroleum & Petroleum Gas.

He was also the Deputy Speaker of the 14th Parliament of Sri Lanka and Chairman of Committees.

== Early life and family ==
He is a lawyer by profession and was educated at St. Aloysius' College, Galle and Nalanda College Colombo.
