= Mansoor Ibrahim =

Sri Lankan politician

Hon. Mansoor Ibrahim MP

Member of Parliament for Ampara District
- Incumbent
- Assumed office 17 August 2015

Personal details
- Born: Mohamed Mansoor Mohamed Ibrahim; October 28, 1965 (age 60) Sammanthurai, Sri Lanka
- Party: Sri Lanka Muslim Congress
- Other political affiliations: United National Party
- Children: 2 Children
- Occupation: Politician

Mohamed Mansoor Mohamed Ibrahim (born 28 October 1965) also known by his Initial M. I. M. Mansoor is a Sri Lankan politician and current member of parliament for Digamadulla District. He contested from United National Party and was elected to the parliament on 17 August 2015. Originally he is a Sri Lanka Muslim Congress member.
