= Sandith Samarasinghe =

Sri Lankan politician

Hon. Sandith Samarasinghe MP As of 2022 to current is now the official Consul General of Sri Lanka of Victoria, Tasmania and South Australia

Member of Parliament for Kegalle District
- Incumbent
- Assumed office 2015

Personal details
- Party: United National Party

Sandith Samarasinghe is a Sri Lankan politician and a member of the Parliament of Sri Lanka. He was elected from Kegalle District in 2015. He is a member of the United National Party.
