= Anuradha Jayaratne =

Sri Lankan politician (born 1985)

Hon. Anuradha Jayaratne MP
- අනුරාධ ජයරත්න அனுராதா ஜயரத்ன

Parliamentary Leader of the New Democratic Front
- Incumbent
- Assumed office 3 December 2024
- Leader: Ranil Wickremesinghe
- Preceded by: Position established

Minister of State for Justice and Prisons Reforms
- In office 8 September 2022 – 23 September 2024
- President: Ranil Wickremesinghe
- Prime Minister: Dinesh Gunawardena
- Minister: Wijeyadasa Rajapakshe; Ali Sabry
- Preceded by: Position established
- Succeeded by: Vacant

Minister of State for Irrigation (Note: Minister of State for Tanks, Reservoirs and Irrigation Development Related to Rural Paddy Fields from 12 August 2020 to 3 April 2022.)
- In office 12 August 2020 – 9 May 2022
- President: Gotabaya Rajapaksa
- Prime Minister: Mahinda Rajapaksa
- Minister: Chamal Rajapaksa; Janaka Wakkumbura
- Preceded by: Mahinda Yapa Abeywardena (Note: As Minister of State for Irrigation and Rural Development)
- Succeeded by: Shasheendra Rajapaksa

Member of Parliament for Kandy District
- Incumbent
- Assumed office 1 September 2015

Personal details
- Born: 22 December 1985 (age 40)
- Party: New Democratic Front (since 2024)
- Other political affiliations: Sri Lanka Freedom Party (until 2019); Sri Lanka Podujana Peramuna (2019–2024)
- Relations: D. M. Jayaratne (father)
- Education: Royal College, Colombo, Trinity College, Kandy
- Profession: Lawyer
- Website: http://anuradhajayaratne.com

Dissanayake Mudiyanse Anuradha Lanka Pradeep Jayaratne (born 22 December 1985) is a Sri Lankan politician currently serving as the parliamentary leader of the New Democratic Front. He is a Member of Parliament from the Kandy District. Previously, he was State Minister of Rural Irrigation and Tanks Development, and a former member of the Central Provincial Council. He is the youngest son of the former prime minister D. M. Jayaratne.

== Education ==
Educated at Trinity College, Kandy and Royal College, Colombo, Jayaratne gained an LL.B. from the University of Buckingham and completed law exams at the Sri Lanka Law College taking oaths as an Attorney at law in 2010. He thereafter gained an LL.M. from the University of Colombo.

== Political career ==
After becoming a lawyer, Jayaratne went into active politics in 2010, working as a private secretary to his father, who was then the prime minister. In 2013, he ran for a seat in the Central Provincial Council and was successfully elected, earning the highest number of preferential votes. Despite this feat, Sarath Ekanayake was picked over Jayaratne for the post of Chief Minister.

Jayaratne contested the 2015 parliamentary elections and was elected to parliament from the Kandy District. In September 2015, he was appointed Deputy Minister of Mahaweli Development and Environment by president Maithripala Sirisena. In August 2016, Jayaratne was appointed Chief Organizer of the Sri Lanka Freedom Party in Ududumbara. He was re-elected in the 2020 parliamentary elections and was appointed State Minister of Rural irrigation and tanks development. Jayaratne was re-elected to parliament in 2024 as a member of the New Democratic Front led by former president Ranil Wickremesinghe, and was subsequently appointed as the parliamentary leader of the NDF.

== Electoral history ==
Election	Constituency	Party	Alliance	Votes	Result
2013 provincial	Kandy District	SLFP	UPFA		Elected
2015 parliamentary	Kandy District	SLFP	UPFA	93,567	Elected
2020 parliamentary	Kandy District	SLPP	SLPFA	140,798	Elected
2024 parliamentary	Kandy District	PUFA	NDF	20,749	Elected

== See also ==
- List of political families in Sri Lanka
