= Nalaka Kolonne =

Sri Lankan politician

Hon. Nalaka Kolonne MP

Member of Parliament for Polonnaruwa District
- Incumbent
- Assumed office 2015

Personal details
- Party: United National Party

Nalaka Prasad Kolonne is a Sri Lankan politician and a member of the Parliament of Sri Lanka. He was elected from Polonnaruwa District in 2015. He is a Member of the United National Party.
