= Arundika Fernando =

Sri Lankan politician

Hon. Arundika Fernando MP
- අරුන්දික ප්‍රනාන්දු அருந்திகா பெர்னாண்டோ

Member of Parliament for Puttalam District
- Incumbent
- Assumed office 2005

Personal details
- Born: 15 September 1971 (age 54)
- Party: Sri Lanka Freedom Party
- Other political affiliations: United People's Freedom Alliance

Arundika Fernando is a Sri Lankan politician, and a member of the Parliament of Sri Lanka. He is affiliated to the Sri Lanka Freedom Party.

Fernando was sacked from his deputy minister position in 2017 by President Sirisena. He has claimed to have served in the Sri Lankan Air Force as a pilot and later in the SriLankan Airlines. However the Sri Lankan Air Force denied that he had ever served in the SLAF in any role and the only record of his career as a pilot is a failed Flying Aptitude Test. The Airline Pilots' Guild of Sri Lanka also denied that he was ever a pilot in the SriLankan Airlines.
