= Malith Jayathilake =

Sri Lankan politician

Hon. Malith Jayathilake MP

Member of Parliament for National List
- Incumbent
- Assumed office 2015

Personal details
- Born: 23 September 1972 (age 53)
- Party: United People's Freedom Alliance

Malith Jayathilake is a Sri Lankan politician and a Member of Parliament. He was appointed to Parliament as a national list member in 2015.
