= Ashoka Priyantha =

Sri Lankan politician

Hon. Ashoka Priyantha MP
- අශෝක ප්‍රියන්ත அசோக பிரியந்த

Member of Parliament for Puttalam District
- Incumbent
- Assumed office 2015

Personal details
- Party: Sri Lanka Podujana Peramuna

Ashoka Priyantha is a Sri Lankan politician and a member of the Parliament of Sri Lanka. He was elected from Puttalam District in 2015.He is a Member of the Sri Lanka Podujana Peramuna.
