= Thushara Indunil =

Sri Lankan politician

Hon. Thushara Indunil Amarasena MP
- තුෂාර ඉඳුනිල් துஷாரா இந்துனில்

Member of Parliament for Kurunegala District
- Incumbent
- Assumed office 2015

Personal details
- Born: 20 July 1968 (age 57) Katugampala
- Party: Samagi Jana Balawegaya
- Education: University of Sri Jayawardenapura, university of Colombo
- Profession: chief organizer of Panduwasnuwara seat

Thushara Indunil Amarasena is a Sri Lankan politician and a member of the Parliament of Sri Lanka. He was elected from Kurunegala District in 2015. He is a Member of the United National Party.
