= Sriyani Wijewickrama =

Sri Lankan politician

Hon. Sriyani Wijewickrama MP

State Minister of Provincial Councils and Local government
- President: Maithripala Sirisena
- Prime Minister: Ranil Wickremesinghe

Member of Parliament for Ampara District
- Incumbent
- Assumed office 8 April 2010

Personal details
- Party: Sri Lanka Freedom Party
- Other political affiliations: Mahajana Eksath Peramuna

Sriyani Wijewickrama is a Sri Lankan politician and a member of the Parliament of Sri Lanka. She is an Attorney-at-Law by profession and an alumnus of University of Colombo In 2017 she left the Mahajana Eksath Peramuna to join Sri Lanka Freedom Party and was appointed as the State Minister of Provincial Councils and Local government by President Maithripala Sirisena
