= Nimal Lanza =

Sri Lankan politician

Hon. Nimal Lanza MP
- නිමල් ලාන්සා நிமல் லான்சா

Member of Parliament for Gampaha District
- Incumbent
- Assumed office 2015

Personal details
- Born: 13 October 1974 (age 51) Negombo
- Party: Sri Lanka Podujana Peramuna
- Spouse: Enoka
- Education: St. Maris College, Negombo
- Occupation: politician

Antony Nimal Lanza Warnakulasooriya (born 13 October 1974), commonly known as Nimal Lanza (Sinhala: නිමල් ලාන්සා, Tamil: நிமல் லான்சா) is a Sri Lankan politician, a member of the Sri Lanka Podujana Peramuna, Sri Lanka Freedom Party - United People's Freedom Alliance/United People's Freedom Alliance, from the Gampaha district.

Nimal Lanza has a brother, Dayann, who is Mayor of Negombo.

He received his education at St. Maris College, Negombo.

He was elected to parliament representing the Gampaha District at the 2015 parliamentary elections. On 9 September 2015 he was appointed the deputy minister of Home Affairs in the second Sirisena cabinet, but resigned from the role on 19 December 2017.

== Controversies ==
On 29 August 2025, Lanza was arrested by the Sri Lanka Police in connection with allegations of assault and trespassing during a protest in 2006. He is subsequently remanded until 12 September by the Negombo magistrate. He was granted bail by the Negombo High Court on 9 September, following a revision application filed against the Negombo magistrate's court order refusing bail.
