= Tharanath Basnayaka =

Sri Lankan politician

Hon. Tharanath Basnayaka MP

Member of Parliament for Kurunegala District
- Incumbent
- Assumed office 2010

Personal details
- Party: Sri Lanka Freedom Party
- Other political affiliations: United People's Freedom Alliance

Tharanath Basnayaka is a Sri Lankan politician, a member of the Parliament of Sri Lanka. He belongs to the Sri Lanka Freedom Party.
