= Wimalaweera Dissanayake =

Sri Lankan politician

Hon. Wimalaweera Dissanayake
- විමලවීර දිසානායක விமலவீர திசாநாயக்க

Minister of Wildlife and Forest Conservation
- In office 18 April 2022 – 9 May 2022
- President: Gotabaya Rajapaksa
- Prime Minister: Mahinda Rajapaksa
- Preceded by: C. B. Ratnayake
- Succeeded by: Mahinda Amaraweera

State Minister of Wildlife Protection, Adoption of Safety Measures including the Construction of Electrical Fences and Trenches and Reforeststation and Forest Resource Development
- In office 27 November 2019 – 3 April 2022
- President: Gotabaya Rajapaksa
- Prime Minister: Mahinda Rajapaksa
- Preceded by: Sarath Fonseka

Member of Parliament for Ampara District
- Incumbent
- Assumed office 17 August 2015

Personal details
- Party: Sri Lanka Freedom Party

Wimalaweera Dissanayake (Sinhala: විමලවීර දිසානායක) is a Sri Lankan politician and member of parliament for Digamadulla District. He was elected on 18 August 2015 from United People's Freedom Alliance. After the 2019 Presidential election, the new president Gotabhaya Rajapaksa appointed him as state minister of wildlife on 27 November 2019. He was reappointed to the same post after the cabinet stepped down in the 2022 crisis. He served from 18 April 2022 until 9 May 2022 following another mass resignation of the Sri Lankan cabinet.

== Political career ==
He was the opposition leader of the Damana Pradeshiya Sabha (local council), Ampara.
