= Chaminda Niroshan =

Sri Lankan cricketer

Chaminda Niroshan was a Sri Lankan cricketer. He was a right-handed batsman and a right-arm bowler who played for Moratuwa Sports Club.

Niroshan made a single first-class appearance for the side, during the 1993–94 season, against Tamil Union. From the lower-middle order, he scored 3 runs in the first innings in which he batted, and, when pushed further up in the order for the second innings, scored 1 run.

Niroshan bowled 6 overs in the match, conceding 21 runs.
