= Thusitha Wijemanne =

Sri Lankan politician

Hon. Dr.Thusitha Wijemanne MP

Member of Parliament for Kegalle District
- Incumbent
- Assumed office 2015

Personal details
- Party: United National Party
- Profession: Doctor

Dr. Thusitha Wijemanne is a Sri Lankan politician and a member of the Parliament of Sri Lanka. She was elected from Kegalla District in 2015. She is a Member of the United National Party.
