= Niroshan Premaratne =

Sri Lankan politician

Hon. Niroshan Premaratne MP

Member of Parliament for Matara District
- In office 1 September 2015 – 3 March 2020

Personal details
- Party: Jathika Nidahas Peramuna
- Other political affiliations: United People's Freedom Alliance

Niroshan Premaratne is a Sri Lankan politician and a member of the Parliament of Sri Lanka. He was elected from Matara District in 2015. He is a Member of the United People's Freedom Alliance.
