= H. E. P. de Mel =

Ceylonese politician (1907–1992)

Hon. Hugh Edmund Peter de Mel

Member of the Ceylonese Parliament for Talawake
- In office 1952–1956
- Preceded by: C. V. Velupillai
- Succeeded by: K. Hemachandra

Personal details
- Born: 17 June 1907 Moratuwa, Ceylon
- Died: 27 September 1992 (aged 85) Colombo, Sri Lanka
- Party: United National Party
- Spouse: Susima Swarnamalie née Dias (m.1931; d.1967)
- Relations: Cornelis Francis de Mel (father), Jane Maria (mother), Joseph Ford Francis (brother), Lena Catherine Maria Perera (sister)
- Children: Ranjanie Mendis (daughter), Jayampathie (son), Sunitha Rodrigo (daughter)
- Education: Prince of Wales College, Moratuwa
- Profession: Manufacturer, politician

Hugh Edmund Peter de Mel (17 June 1907 – 27 September 1992) was a Ceylonese politician.

Hugh Edmund Peter de Mel, was born 17 June 1907 in Moratuwa, the son of Cornelis Francis de Mel, and the brother of Joseph Ford Francis, all of whom were key figures in the country's safety match industry. In 1929, de Mel established the Lanka Light Match factory in Moratuwa. He married Susima Swarnamalie née Dias, in 1931.

De Mel ran as the United National Party candidate in the 2nd parliamentary election, held from 24 May 1952 to 30 May 1952, in the Talawake electorate. He was successful, polling 1,198 votes (54% of the total vote), 352 votes ahead of his nearest rival.

In the subsequent 3rd parliamentary election, held from 5 April 1956 to 10 April 1956, de Mel chose to contest the seat of Moratuwa instead of Talawake. However, he was unsuccessful, losing to the Lanka Sama Samaja Party candidate, Meryl Fernando, by 7,718 votes. Fernando, a trade unionist, had previously attempted to organise workers at de Mel's match factory in 1945.

De Mel also served on the Executive Council of the Ceylon National Chamber of Industries as Deputy Chairman for several years in the 1960s.
