= Wimalasiri =

Wimalasiri is both a given name and a surname. Notable people with the name include:

- Wimalasiri de Mel (1926–2010), Sri Lankan politician
- H. R. Wimalasiri, Sri Lankan politician
- Raveendra Wimalasiri (born 1969), Sri Lankan cricketer
- Sanath Wimalasiri (born 1974), Sri Lankan actor
