= Harischandra Wijayatunga =

Sri Lankan politician (1931–2025)

Harischandra Wijetunga
- හරිශ්චන්ද්‍ර විජේතුංග
- Born: 25 October 1931; Minuwangoda, British Ceylon (now Sri Lanka)
- Died: 12 November 2025 (aged 94); Sri Lanka
- Other name: Wijetunga Mudalige Harischandra Wijetunga
- Education: Nalanda College, Colombo; University of Ceylon; University of Kelaniya
- Occupations: Sinhala writer, author, lawyer, politician
- Political party: Motherland People's Party
- Spouse: Kalukapuge Karuna Perera (died 2000)
- Children: 4

Wijayatunga Mudalige Harischandra Wijayatunga (Sinhala: විජයතුංග මුදලිගේ හරිශ්චන්ද්‍ර විජයතුංග; 25 October 1931 – 12 November 2025) was a Sri Lankan author, translator, lexicographer, teacher, lawyer and politician. He held various offices in different institutions of the Government of Sri Lanka. Wijayatunga was also leader of the Motherland People's Party, and was the party's candidate for president in 1994 and 1999.

Wijayatunga was the compiler of the Practical Sinhala Dictionary (1982) and Gunasena Great Sinhala Dictionary, considered to be the most comprehensive Sinhala dictionaries to date. Wijayatunga also proposed scientific ideas to standardise the Sinhala script.

== Early life and education ==
Harischandra Wijayatunga was born on 25 October 1931 at Madamulla in Minuwangoda, British Colony of Ceylon. His father, Wijayatunga Mudalige Don Bastian Wijayatunga, was an Ayurvedic eye physician, landed proprietor and coconut and paddy planter. His mother was Amarawathie Jayasinghe. Wijayatunga was the fourth in a family of eight siblings.

Wijayatunga received his elementary education at the Government Bilingual School in Minuwangoda. When Nalanda College Colombo was relocated to Minuwangoda during World War II, Wijayatunga's parents took the opportunity to transfer him to the school. After the war, Nalanda College was shifted back to Colombo, and Wijayatunga continued his studies there. Some of Wijayatunga's classmates at Nalanda College included Karunaratne Abeysekera, Dr Hudson Silva, Hon. Dr Dharmasena Attygalle, Hon. Rupa Karunathilake, Ravindra Rupasena and Stanley Jayasinghe.

In 1952, he entered the University of Ceylon and graduated in 1955 with a bachelor's degree in science.

In 1990, he was awarded a PhD by the University of Kelaniya for his thesis Legal Philosophy in Medieval Sinhale.

== Career ==
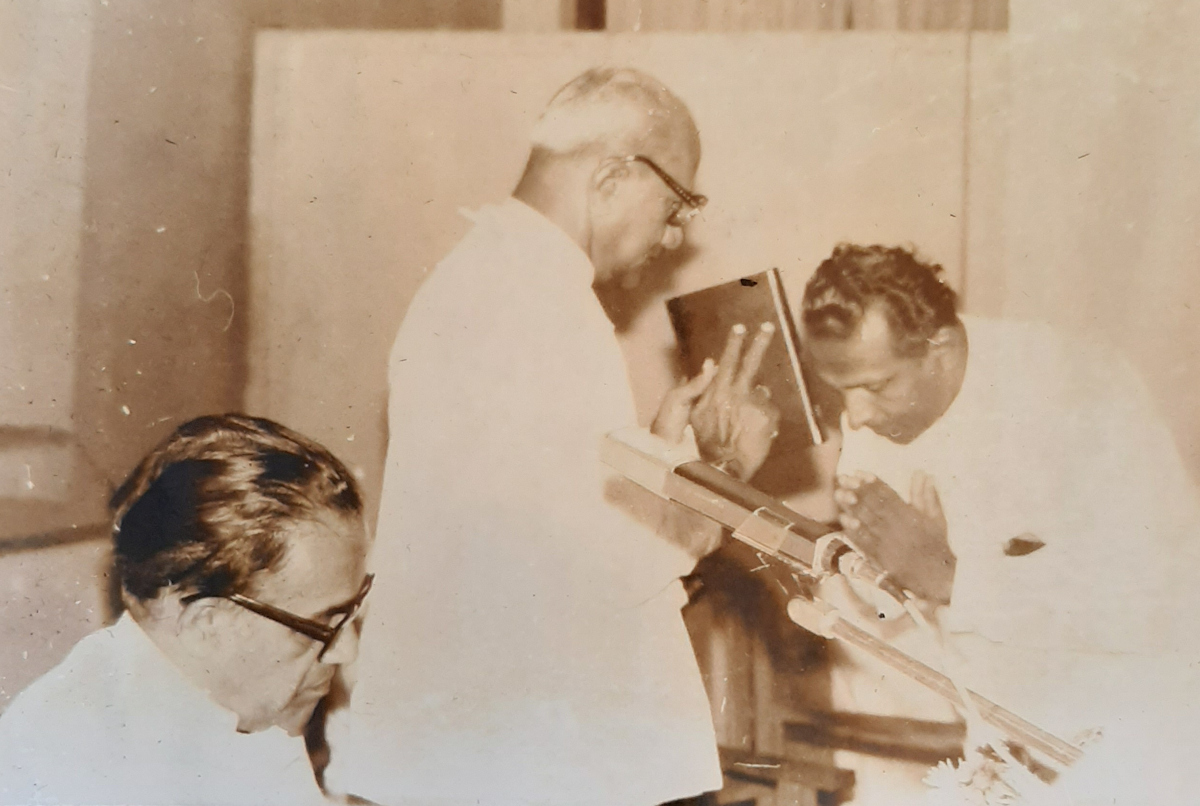
Felicitation of Dr. Harischandra Wijayatunga in 1979, for writing Modern Sinhala Technical Terms dictionary. (Left to right) E. L. B. Hurulle, Cabinet Minister, Cultural Affairs, Cyril Mathew, Minister, Industry and Scientific Affairs, Dr. Wijayatunga.

Immediately after completing his higher education, Wijayatunga joined the staff of Dharmaraja College as a science teacher. In addition, he also taught chemistry at the Mahamaya Girls' College. It was during this time he wrote his first book Miridiya Jivihu (Freshwater Life). In 1956, he was appointed as the Editor of the Science Section of the Sinhala Encyclopaedia, established at the University of Peradeniya. After some years of service there, he assumed the post of vice-principal at Dharmaraja College.

In 1965, he was appointed to the Sri Lanka Standards Institution (SLSI) which started work in the same year. He was the first and only member appointed to the staff, functioning as its secretary. Under his supervision, Divisional Committees on Electrical Engineering, Mechanical Engineering, Civil Engineering, Agriculture and Chemicals, and Metrication of Sri Lanka were appointed.

The next step, he took was joining Sri Lanka Law College as a student. He took oaths as an Attorney-at-Law in 1973.

Wijayatunga appeared for the accused in the 1971 JVP insurrection before the Criminal Justice Commission. He represented several parties at the Presidential Commission headed by former Chief Justice Miliani Sansoni.

Throughout the 1980s, Wijayatunga held various offices such as Chief Editor of the Sinhala Bauddhya tabloid, director of the Sri Lanka Ayurvedic Drugs Corporation, and member of the Directorate of Siddhayurveda College, Gampaha. Between 1984 and 1990, he was the Editor-in-Chief of the Sinhalese Encyclopaedia as well as the Officer-in-Charge of the Sinhala version of the Legislative Enactments of Sri Lanka.

== Political career ==
Wijayatunga first entered politics during his university days. He was a strong advocate for the implementation of Sinhala as the sole official language of the Dominion of Ceylon during the 1950s, becoming a founding member of the Sinhala Union of the University of Ceylon. During his stay in Kandy, he associated himself with the work of the Sri Lanka Freedom Party (SLFP) led by 4th Prime Minister of Ceylon S. W. R. D. Bandaranaike.

Wijayatunga's political philosophy is Mahasammatavada (Great Consensus); consulting all people, which he described as "going beyond democracy".

=== Sinhala language campaign ===
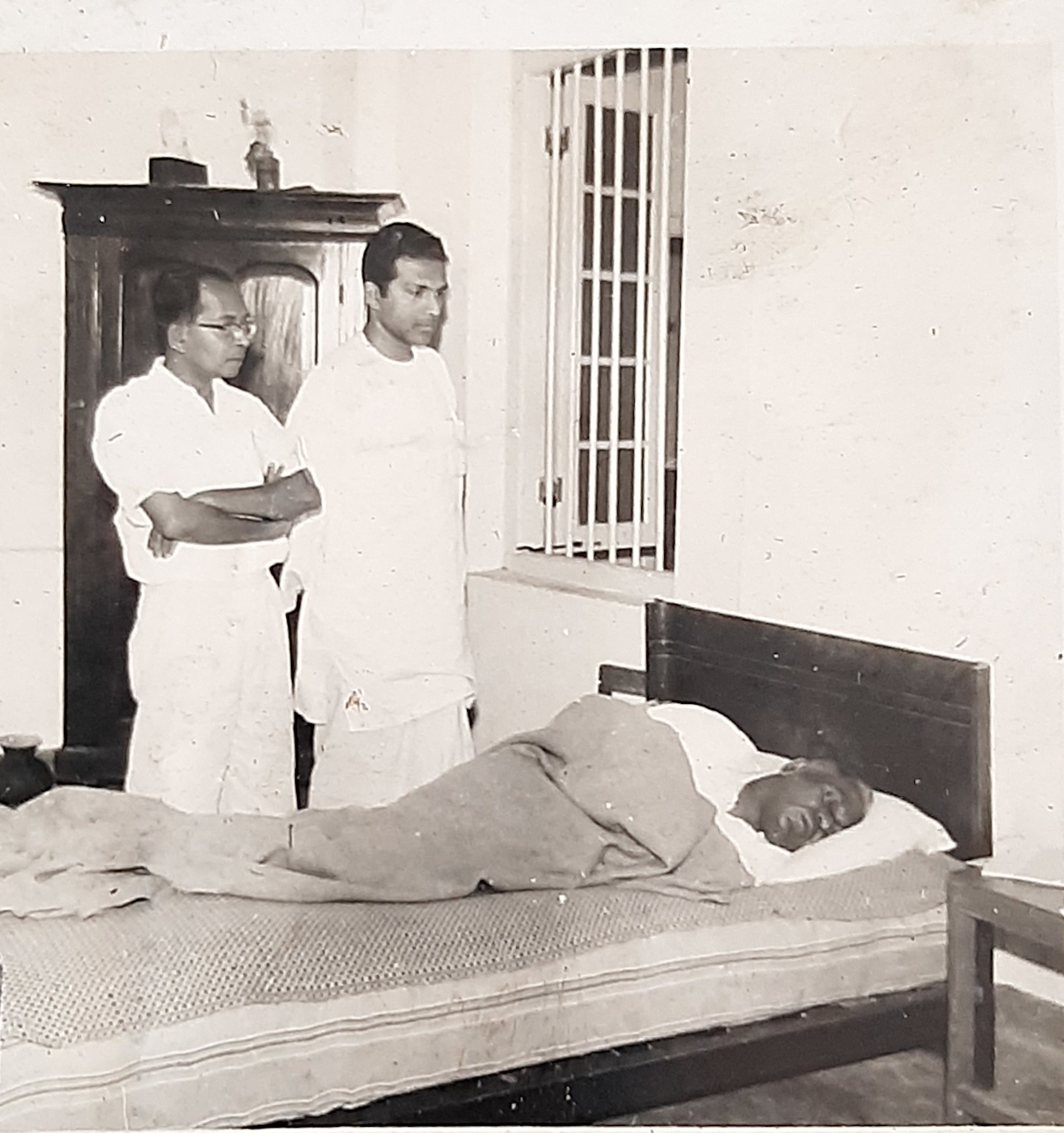
Fast unto death by Prof. F. R. Jayasuriya, 1956. (center) Mr. Harischandra Wijayatunga

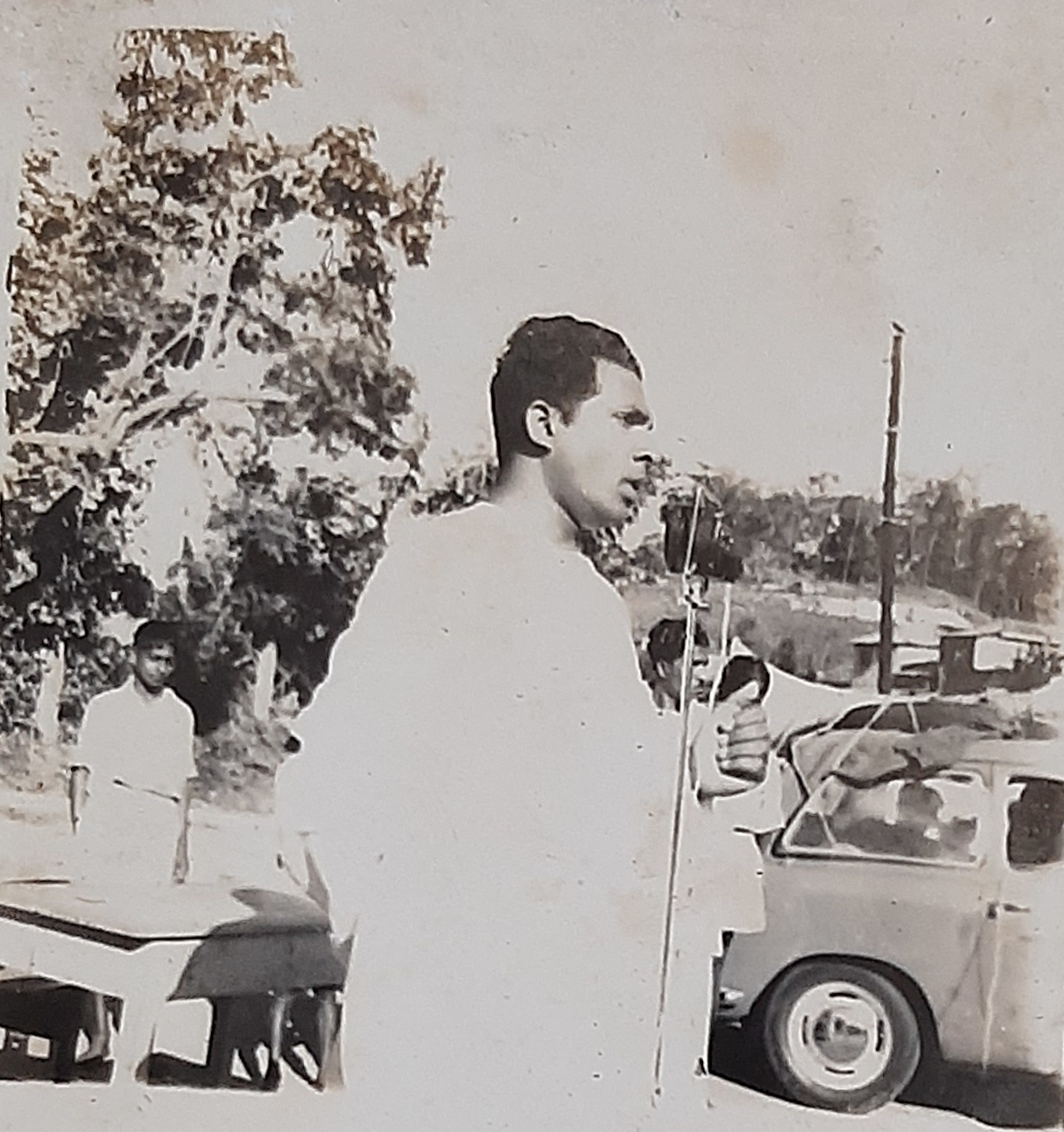
Wijayatunga campaigning to enact Sinhala as the sole official language as part of Prof. F. R. Jayasuriya's fast unto death, 1956.

During the 1956 general election, the Sri Lanka Freedom Party led by S. W. R. D. Bandaranaike ran on a heavily nationalistic campaign. One of the party's main promises was the replacement of English as the official language of the country with Sinhala.

Following a landslide victory for the SLFP, Bandaranaike proceeded to make Sinhala the official state language, with administrative provisions for Tamil. Following this decision, Professor F. R. Jayasuriya began a fast unto death to pressure Bandaranaike's government into making Sinhala the sole official language with no concessions to the Tamil language.

Jayasuriya's hunger strike was openly supported by Wijayatunga and other Sinhalese extremists. Eventually, the cabinet of S. W. R. D. Bandaranaike was able to reach an agreement with the Sinhalese activists, and as a result the controversial Sinhala Only Act was born.

=== Motherland People's Party ===
Following dissatisfaction with both main parties of Sri Lanka, Wijayatunga established the Sinhalaye Mahasammatha Bhoomiputra Pakshaya in 1990 with a group of intellectuals.

In 1994, Wijayatunga ran for president as the candidate of his party and polled 32,651 votes, finishing in fourth place. He ran again in 1999, polling 35,854 votes and finishing in fourth place once again. He ran for a seat in parliament in 2000, 2001 and 2004, but was unsuccessful each time.

Wijayatunga chose not to run for president in 2005, instead endorsing SLFP candidate and prime minister Mahinda Rajapaksa.

Wijayatunga advocated that the civil war could and should only be ended by combat since early 1990.

== Personal life and death ==
Wijayatunga was married to Kalukapuge Karuna Perera, who died in 2000. The couple had three sons (Widyasagara, b. 1965, Chakrapani, b. 1967 and Chandrakeerthi, b. 1970) and a daughter (Shyama Kumari, b. 1969).

Wijayatunga had travelled widely in many Asian, African and European countries, and was invited to address various groups of learned societies in India, Japan, the United Kingdom and Australia.

On 25 October 2021, his 90th birthday, Wijayatunga was felicitated by Nalanda College Colombo in a programme called Harisanda Harasara, where two books Abhinandana Special Issue and Margagatha Abhinandana Sambhashanaya 2021 were also launched.

Wijayatunga died on 12 November 2025, at the age of 94.

== Published works ==
Science works

- මිරිදිය ජීවිහු (1955)
- ජ්‍යේෂ්‍ඨ රසායන විද්යාව (1956)
- පොළොවේ කථාන්තරය (1959)

Translations

- බ්‍රව්‍නිං සහ ජෝසෆ් ලියූ ප්‍රායෝගික රසායන විද්යාව - ජ්‍යේෂ්‍ඨ රසායන විද්යාව (1956)
- ඩරන්ට් ගේ කාබනික රසායනය (1963)
- මාඕ සේතුං ගේ කලාව හා සාහිත්යය (1963)

Creative works

- පහන් වන දා (1961)
- කුමාරතුංග ගේ සමාජ දර්ශනය (1962)
- සිංහල ශබ්දකෝෂ සම්පාදනයට අලුත් ආකල්පයක් (1977)
- හෙවිසි එපා (2007)

Dictionaries

- නූතන සිංහල පාරිභාෂික ශබ්දකෝෂය (1978)
- පරිපාලන ශබ්දකෝෂය (1982)
- ප්රායෝගික සිංහල ශබ්දකෝෂය, කාණ්ඩ I සහ II (1982/84)
- ගුණසේන මහා සිංහල ශබ්දකෝෂය (2005)

Works on Religion and History

- ආගමික නිදහස හා මූලික අයිතිය (2003)
- යක්කු සහ කුවේණිය (2008)

Works on Politics

- ජාතික සටන (1960)
- ජනතා ජයග්රහණයේ අනාගතය (1963)
- ලෝකය රක්නා රාජ්‍ය තන්ත්රය – මහ සම්මතවාදය (1991)
- Mahasammatavada (1992)
- ජාතික අනන්යතාවේ න්යායික පසුබිම (1992)
- නේරු-කොතලාවල ගිවිසුම ක්රියාත්මක කරමු (1993)
- වෙනසක පෙරනිමිති (1995)
- මූලික අයිතිය පෙන්වා උත්තරීතර අයිතිය පැහැර ගැනීම (1996)
- භීෂණයෙන් තොර සමාජයක් (1999)
- මාර සෙනඟ ගේ හා දේවදත්තයන්ගේ වැඩ (2003)
- බුද්ධ ජයන්ති සමය - කුමන්ත්රණ සහ ඝාතන (2012)
- Under Velupillai Prabhakaran (2012)
- ඊළම්‍ කණ්‍ඩවර් සහ අවතාර පුරැෂයා නුදුටු විමුක්‍තිය (2014)
- නේරැ - කොතලාවල ගිවිසුම සහ නිර්මලතා කොමිසම (2015)

Works on Law

- නීති නිඝණ්ඩුව (1998)
- Legal Philosophy in Medieval Sinhale (2008)
- මධ්යකාලීන ලංකාවේ නීතිය (2013)

Works on travel

- සුන්දර කෙන්යාව හෙවත් මාසෛයන් ගේ රට (2002)

Philosophical works

- ඊර්ෂ්යාකාරයා ගේ අණ (2006)
- මනසට දැමූ විලංගු ගැලවීම (2010)
- කාලය වර්තමානය සහ පැතලි ලෝකයේ විශ්‍වාස (2015)

Biographical works

- දැනගත යුතු ම විරල චරිත කීපයක්‍ (2015)

Language

- බසක ගැටලු (2009)
- සිංහල අකුරු අකාරාදී කිරීම සහ ප්රමිත කිරීම (2003)
