= Kalyanaratne Hemachandra =

Ceylonese planter, merchant, and politician

Hon. Kalyanaratne Hemachandra

Member of the Ceylonese Parliament for Talawake
- In office 19 April 1956 – 5 December 1959
- Preceded by: H. E. P. de Mel
- Succeeded by: seat abolished

Personal details
- Died: 6 July 1962
- Party: United National Party
- Occupation: planter, merchant, politician

Kalyanaratne Hemachandra (died 6 July 1962) was a Ceylonese planter, merchant and politician.

In January 1948 he was elected as one of the inaugural members of the Talawakelle - Lindula Urban Council, a position he retained until his death in 1962.

At the 3rd parliamentary elections, held on 5 April 1956, Hemachandra ran as the United National Party candidate in the Talawakelle electorate. He received 1,720 votes (52% of the total vote) defeating the Sri Lanka Freedom Party candidate, Edmund Wanigasekera, by 160 votes.
