= Kusala Abhayavardhana =

Sri Lankan social worker

Kusala Vichitra Abhayavardhana (née Fernando) (1 November 1920 – 1988) was a Sri Lankan social worker. She was the co-founder of the Civil Service International in Sri Lanka, founding secretary International Women’s Year Sri Lanka and national chair of the Women in Peace in Sri Lanka. She was a Member of Parliament from 1970 to 1977.

== Early life and education ==
Born Warusahennedige Kusala Vichitra Mututantri on 1 November 1920, to a wealthy family in Thimbirigasyaya, Colombo. Her father Warusahennedige Daniel Fernando, OBE worked in the Finger Print Bureau of the Criminal Investigation Department at Hulftsdorp, later becoming a successful businessmen with close ties to Sir Oliver Goonetilleke. He was the founder and a director of United Imports, United Motors, United Tractor Equipment, and was awarded a MBE in the 1950 Birthday Honours for public and charitable services and an OBE in the 1952 New Year Honours for charitable and commercial services. Her mother was Kankana Tantirige Bhaddhrawathie Fernando, who founded the Bhaddhrawathie Maha Vidayala (since renamed Mahamathya Maha Vidyalaya) in Polhengoda. She had three brothers, W. Pinsiripal "Pinsi" Fernando, W. Parakrama Fernando, W. Dhammikka Mahinda Fernando and one sister, W. Yasoma Fernando, who married Kamal Punchihewa. She was educated at Visakha Vidyalaya, at the University of Ceylon, and at the London School of Economics.

== Political career ==
She contested the Colombo Municipal Council from the Thimbirigasyaya ward from the United National Party, but was defeated by Bernard Soysa. She was later elected to the Colombo Municipal Council and served as a Municipal Councilor. Kusala Fernando married Hector Abhayavardhana a journalist and Trotskyist in 1959. She contested the 1965 general election from the Lanka Sama Samaja Party (LSSP) in the Moratuwa electorate, where she polled second after Ruskin Fernando. At the 1970 general elections she ran as the LSSP candidate in the Borella electorate and was elected to parliament, defeating incumbent the United National Party candidate, M. H. Mohamed by 16,421 votes to 15,829 votes.
