= Asian Tribune =

Online newspaper

The Asian Tribune
- Type: Online newspaper

The Asian Tribune is an online newspaper. Their funding is unknown, and critics, such as the Sri Lanka Guardian, consider their journalism to be of poor quality. The publication is owned by K.T. Rajasingham, who is also a writer for the publication. The online source provides news and editorial on the current affairs of Asia, with a special emphasis on South Asia but mostly concentrates its news on the current Civil conflict in Sri Lanka with questionable reliability.

Publication began in 2002 and was then based in Bangkok, Thailand. Its print edition was discontinued in 2011. The publication is registered in Sweden as an online publication. Asian Tribune is currently based in Bangladesh.

== Defamation conviction ==
A Swedish court found Asian Tribune editor K. T. Rajasingham and the World Institute for Asian Studies guilty of "gross defamation". Norwegian journalist Nadarajah Sethurupan, who filed the lawsuit, claimed that Rajasingham called him and asked him to work with his secret unit to attack the Sri Lanka peace process. When Sethurupan refused to join, the hidden unit started attacking him as a "terrorist" on the Asian Tribune website. The attacks continued from 2005 to 2008.

A Swedish Court of Appeal upheld the judgment of the lower court in February 2012 and ordered Rajasingham and the World Institute for Asian Studies Institute to pay Sethurupan about $20,000.
