= Somaweera Chandrasiri =

Sinhalese poet and Ceylonese politician

Hon. Somaweera Chandrasiri
- Portrait of Chandrasiri

Member of the Ceylon Parliament for Moratuwa
- In office 1947–1952
- Preceded by: seat created
- Succeeded by: Meryl Fernando

Member of the Ceylon Parliament for Kesbewa
- In office 1960–1971
- Preceded by: seat created
- Succeeded by: Dharmasena Attygalle

Personal details
- Born: 11 February 1909 Mampe, Ceylon
- Died: 11 July 1971 (aged 62)
- Party: Sri Lanka Freedom Party
- Education: Prince of Wales College, Moratuwa
- Profession: poet, politician

Somaweera Chandrasiri (11 February 1909 – 11 July 1971) was a Sinhalese poet and Ceylonese politician.

Somaweera Chandrasiri was born 11 February 1909 in Mampe. He attended Prince of Wales College, Moratuwa. In 1937 he was elected to the Mampe-Kesbewa Urban Council. Although he was not a member of the Lanka Sama Samaja Party (LSSP) Chandrasiri edited and published a pro-LSSP weekly newspaper Nidahasa. He was arrested and jailed for contempt of court, whilst he was in jail he lodged his nomination papers for the country's first parliamentary elections.

At the 1st parliamentary election, held between 23 August 1947 and 20 September 1947, Chandrasiri was elected as the LSSP candidate in the Moratuwa electorate, securing 48.15% of the total vote, 3,917 votes ahead of his nearest rival. He retained the seat at the 2nd parliamentary election, held between 24 May 1952 and 30 May 1952, receiving 41.19% of the total vote.

In October 1953 he split from the LSSP and was unsuccessful in his attempt to retain the seat of Moratuwa at the 3rd parliamentary election, held between 5 April 1956 and 10 April 1956, where he ran as an independent candidate. He polled 6,559 votes (16.26% of the total vote), 12,970 votes behind the successful LSSP candidate, Meryl Fernando.

Candrasiri contested the newly created Kesbewa electorate at the 4th parliamentary elections in March 1960, where he received 11,115 votes (38.58% of the total vote) and was duly elected. He subsequently joined the Sri Lanka Freedom Party (SLFP), and ran as the party's candidate in the July 1960 parliamentary election, where he polled 45.37% of the total vote, retaining the seat. At the 6th parliamentary election, held on 22 March 1965, he increased his winning margin to 57.87% of the total vote, over 7,000 votes clear of his nearest rival.

At the 7th parliamentary election in May 1970 he polled 32,332 votes (64.37% of the total vote) and 14,606 votes in front of his United National Party rival, Dharmasena Attygalle. In 1970 he was appointed the Deputy Minister of Cultural Affairs in the Second Sirimavo Bandaranaike cabinet.

In September 1970 a Tamil militant, Pon Sivakumaran, attempted to assassinate Chandrasiri by placing a time bomb under Chandrasiri's car when he was visiting Urumpirai Hindu College however the bomb exploded whilst nobody was in the car.
