= Stanley Jayasinghe =

Sri Lankan cricketer

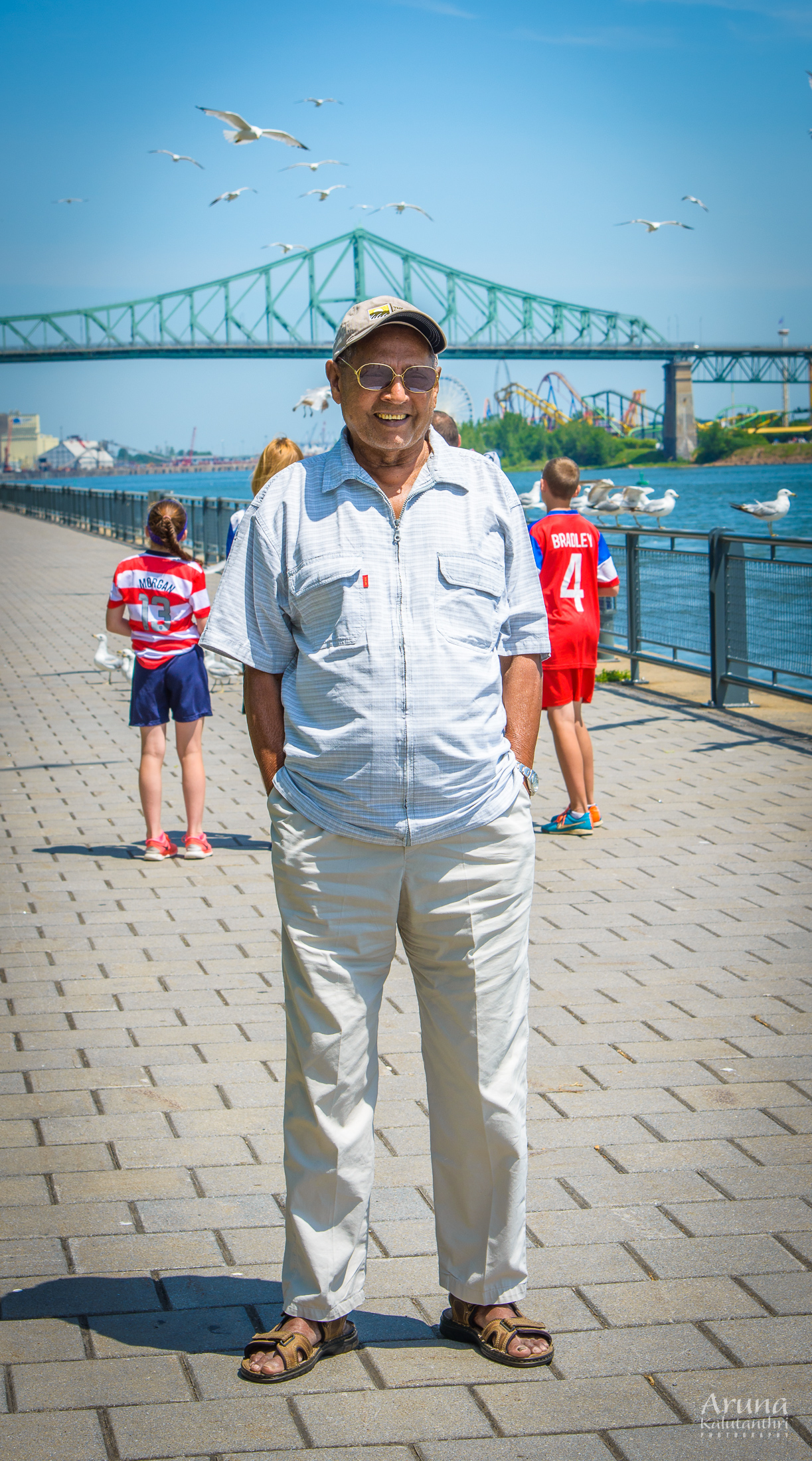

Personal information
- Born: 19 January 1931 (age 95); Badulla, Ceylon
- Batting: Right-handed
- Bowling: Right arm off-spin

Domestic team information
- Years: Team
- 1961 to 1965: Leicestershire

Career statistics
Competition	FC	List A
Matches	144	2
Runs scored	6,811	19
Batting average	27.91	9.50
100s/50s	6/40	0/0
Top score	135	18
Balls bowled	2,494	0
Wickets	34	–
Bowling average	35.20	–
5 wickets in innings	1	–
10 wickets in match	0	–
Best bowling	6/38	–
Catches/stumpings	109/0	1/0
- Source: Cricinfo, 21 January 2024

Stanley Jayasinghe (born January 19, 1931, in Badulla) is a former Sri Lankan cricketer who played for Ceylon prior to the country being renamed Sri Lanka, and prior to them receiving either Test or ODI status. He was a right-handed batsman and part-time offbreak bowler. In his first-class cricket career which began in 1949/50 he also played cricket in England for Leicestershire. In 1965 he publicly refused to play against the white-only South Africans who were touring England, after his own experiences of racism playing against the South Africans in 1960. He retired in 1968/69.

In September 2018, he was one of 49 former Sri Lankan cricketers felicitated by Sri Lanka Cricket, to honour them for their services before Sri Lanka became a full member of the International Cricket Council (ICC).

== Early life ==
Stanley who was educated at Nalanda College, Colombo captained Nalanda College first XI cricket team in 1951. Some of Stanley's notable classmates at Nalanda College were Karunaratne Abeysekera, Dr Harischandra Wijayatunga, Dr Hudson Silva, Hon. Dr Dharmasena Attygalle, Dr Henry Jayasena, Hon. Rupa Karunathilake, Bernie Wijesekera.

Former All Ceylon and Nondescripts Cricket Club cricketer Carl Obeysekera and Ashley de Silva who were also from Nalanda College played for Ceylon at the same time.

Stanley was adjudged the Times of Ceylon Sportsman of the Year in 1951.

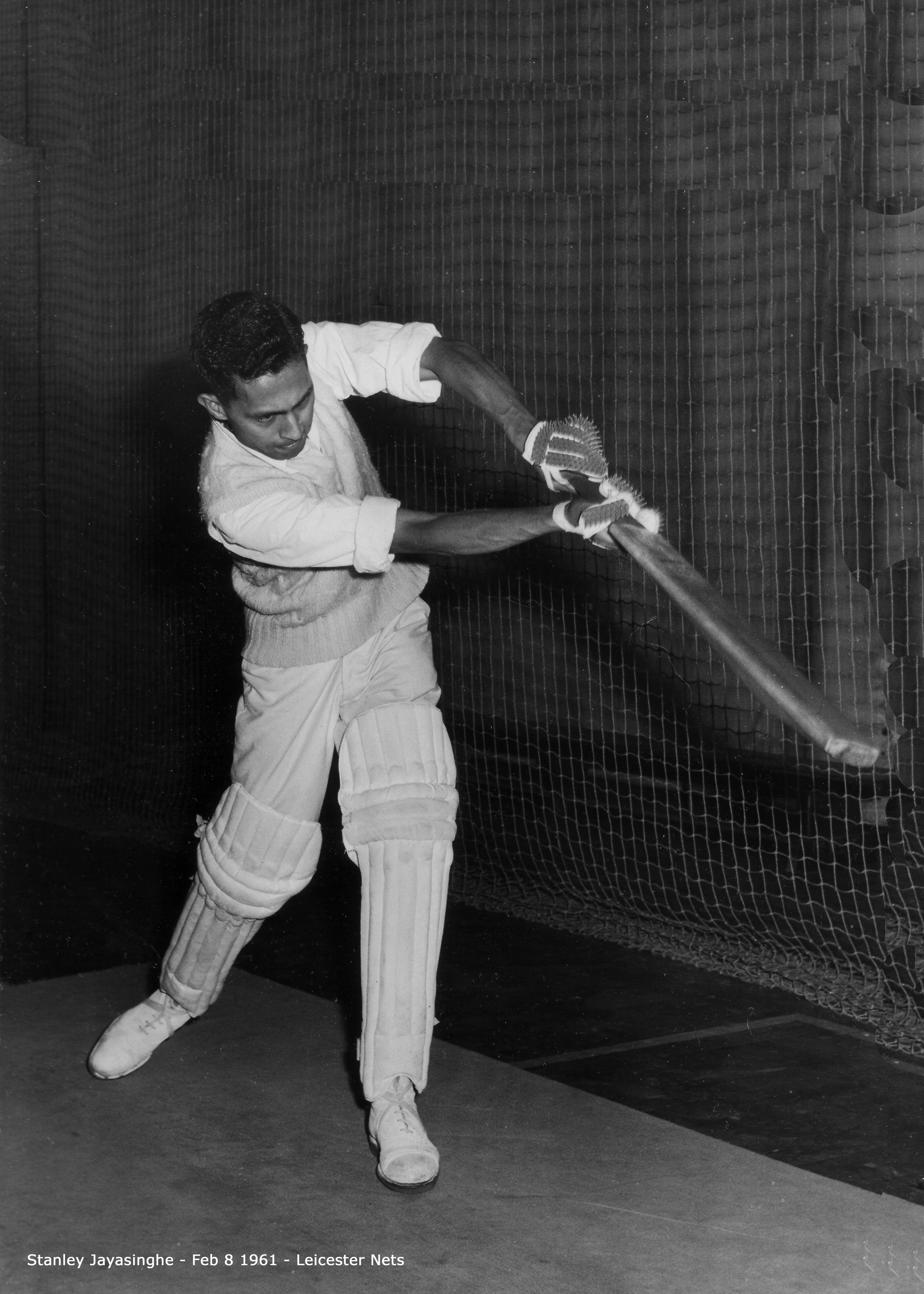
Stanley Jayasinghe

== Cricket administrator ==
Stanley Jayasinghe also has been one time a member of the National Selection Committee and Manager of Sri Lanka cricket team. Stanley was a hugely sought-after coach in Sri Lanka from the late 1970's. His coaching style, coupled with a caring, fatherly treatment towards his students, made him one of the most successful coaches in the country during the 70's and 80's. He later was appointed the Manager of the Sri Lankan cricket team and developed it to very high standards, laying the discipline and attitude in the players he managed, who later led the Sri Lankan team to its one and only ODI World Cup in 1996.

== Family life ==
Stanley is married to Erika, a German and they are blessed with a daughter, Yvonne.
