= Kesbewa Electoral District =

Electoral district of Sri Lanka

Kesbewa electoral district was an electoral district of Sri Lanka between March 1960 and February 1989. The district was named after the town of Kesbewa in Colombo District, Western Province. The 1978 Constitution of Sri Lanka introduced the proportional representation electoral system for electing members of Parliament. The existing 160 mainly single-member electoral districts were replaced with 22 multi-member electoral districts. Kesbewa electoral district was replaced by the Colombo multi-member electoral district at the 1989 general elections.

== Members of Parliament ==
Key

Independent SLFP UNP

Election	Member	Party	Term
1960 (March)	Somaweera Chandrasiri	SLNF	1960-1960
1960 (July)	Somaweera Chandrasiri	SLFP	1960-1965
1965	Somaweera Chandrasiri	SLFP	1965-1970
1970	Somaweera Chandrasiri	SLFP	1970-1971
1972 by-election	Dharmasena Attygalle	UNP	1972-1977
1977	Dharmasena Attygalle	UNP	1977-82
1983 by-election	Gamini Lokuge	UNP	1983-89

== Elections ==
=== 1960 (March) Parliamentary General Election ===
Results of the 4th parliamentary election held on 19 March 1960:

Candidate	Party	Symbol	Votes	%
Somaweera Chandrasiri	Sri Lanka National Front	Spoon	11,115	38.58
Edmund Samarakkody	Lanka Sama Samaja Party	Key	7,433	25.80
P. L. F. Seneviratne	United National Party	Elephant	7,384	25.63
I. C. Perera	Sri Lanka Freedom Party	Hand	2,353	8.17
Hemachandra Gunatilleke	Independent	Clock	236	0.82
L. D. B. Wanigasuriya	Independent	Cockrel	126	0.44
Valid Votes			28,647	99.43
Rejected Votes			165	0.57
Total Polled			28,812	100.00
Registered Electors			36,188	
Turnout				79.62

=== 1960 (July) Parliamentary General Election ===
Results of the 5th parliamentary election held on 20 July 1960:

Candidate	Party	Symbol	Votes	%
Somaweera Chandrasiri	Sri Lanka Freedom Party	Hand	12,152	45.37
Bodhipala Waidyasekera	United National Party	Elephant	8,427	31.46
Ruban Perera		Key	5,856	21.86
I. C. Perera		Bell	240	0.90
Valid Votes			26,675	99.59
Rejected Votes			111	0.41
Total Polled			26,786	100.00
Registered Electors			36,188	
Turnout				74.02

=== 1965 Parliamentary General Election ===
Results of the 6th parliamentary election held on 22 March 1965:

Candidate	Party	Symbol	Votes	%
Somaweera Chandrasiri	Sri Lanka Freedom Party	Hand	22,754	57.87
P. L. F. Seneviratne	United National Party	Elephant	15,751	40.06
W. J. Perera		Cartwheel	583	1.48
Valid Votes			39,088	99.42
Rejected Votes			228	0.58
Total Polled			39,316	100.00
Registered Electors			48,385	
Turnout				81.26

=== 1970 Parliamentary General Election ===
Results of the 7th parliamentary election held on 27 May 1970:

Candidate	Party	Symbol	Votes	%
Somaweera Chandrasiri	Sri Lanka Freedom Party	Hand	32,332	64.37
Dharmasena Attygalle	United National Party	Elephant	17,726	35.29
Valid Votes			50,058	99.66
Rejected Votes			173	0.34
Total Polled			50,231	100.00
Registered Electors			62,441	
Turnout				80.45

=== 1972 Parliamentary By-election ===
Results of the parliamentary by-election held on 9 October 1972:

Candidate	Party	Symbol	Votes	%
Dharmasena Attygalle	United National Party	Elephant	22,592	39.42
Subhas Chandrasiri		Spoon	19,549	34.11
Dixon J. Perera	Sri Lanka Freedom Party	Hand	14,269	24.90
W. G. Shelton Jayasekera		Bell	332	0.56
B. D. Somapala		Ladder	193	0.34
D. A. Preman		Cartwheel	192	0.34
Valid Votes			57,064	99.56
Rejected Votes			250	0.44
Total Polled			57,314	100.00
Registered Electors			62,441	
Turnout				91.79

=== 1977 Parliamentary General Election ===
Results of the 8th parliamentary election held on 21 July 1977:

Candidate	Party	Symbol	Votes	%
Dharmasena Attygalle	United National Party	Elephant	24,850	51.39
Dixon J. Perera	Sri Lanka Freedom Party	Hand	19,250	39.81
Malini Chandrasiri		Key	3,814	7.89
T. N. Perera		Bell	298	0.60
Valid Votes			48,212	99.71
Rejected Votes			140	0.29
Total Polled			48,352	100.00
Registered Electors			57,237	
Turnout				84.48

=== 1983 Parliamentary By-election ===
Results of the parliamentary by-election held on 18 May 1983:

Candidate	Party	Symbol	Votes	%
Gamini Lokuge	United National Party	Elephant	27,821	50.84
Dixon J. Perera	Sri Lanka Freedom Party	Hand	23,962	43.79
Subas Chandrasiri Vithanage		Spoon	382	0.70
M. Wijayasiri Perera		Tree	93	0.17
Thilakaratne Wettasinghe		Flower	93	0.17
Valid Votes			54,311	99.25
Rejected Votes			411	0.75
Total Polled			54,722	100.00
Registered Electors			57,237	
Turnout				95.61
