= Hector Abhayavardhana =

Sri Lankan Trotskyist theoretician (1919–2012)

- Born: 5 January 1919; Kandy, Sri Lanka
- Died: 22 September 2012 (aged 93)
- Occupation: Theoretician

Hector Abhayavardhana (5 January 1919 – 22 September 2012) was a Sri Lankan Trotskyist theoretician, a long-standing member of the Lanka Sama Samaja Party (LSSP) and a founder-member of the Bolshevik-Leninist Party of India, Ceylon and Burma.

== Early life ==
Abhayavardhana was born in Kandy where his maternal grandfather was an Anglican vicar - at a time when the Church of England was the established church. His father was a government servant and a pillar of the establishment.

Abhayavardhana was educated at St Thomas' College, Mt. Lavinia. His upbringing, being anglicised in culture and religion, was typical of the colonial middle-class and hence remote from the mass of Sinhala-speaking Buddhist people. He and his fellow matriculation student were once posed the question 'Would you have been better off under your own king?' by their teacher, in response to which he began to ponder upon nationalism and British colonial rule.

At fifteen he renounced Christianity and became an atheist. In 1936 he joined University College, Colombo where he read liberal arts and came under the influence of E.F.C. Ludowyk and Doric de Souza, who had Marxist sympathies. He went on to complete his colonial education at the Colombo Law College.

Abhayavardhana's first exposure to radical politics was the Bracegirdle incident, in which the Colonial Government sought to deport an Australian labour activist. He attended a mass meeting at Galle Face Green on 5 May 1937 at Bracegirdle made a dramatic appearance and a stirring speech before being whisked away into hiding. At the time, his father was the Chief Clerk in the office of Governor Reginald Stubbs, who sought the deportation and against whom this meeting was directed.

He organised the Mount Lavinia Debating Society, which invited such speakers as Dr. Colvin R. de Silva and J. R. Jayewardene.

== Revolutionary ==
Abhayavardhana was recruited to the Lanka Sama Samaja Party in 1940 by Esmond Wickremesinghe (later to be father of Ranil Wickremasinghe). He became part of the clandestine section of the LSSP that was established, in anticipation of its proscription, to work underground. After the party leaders were imprisoned and escaped to India he joined them in exile there (disguised as an Anglican priest) and worked in the Independence movement.

He became a member of the Bolshevik-Leninist Party of India, Ceylon and Burma (BLPI) and began his career as a writer. His two pamphlets 'The Saboteur Strategy of the Constructive Programme' and on the Quit India Movement of the Congress Party were considered to be seminal theoretical works. When the main LSSP leaders returned to Sri Lanka after the war, Abhayawardhana was among the Sama Samajists who remained in India.

=== Journalist ===
He worked on the fortnightly New Spark in Bombay, later moving to Chennai. He became General Secretary of the Socialist Party which was created by the fusion in 1948 of the BLPI with the Congress Socialist Party. He moved to New Delhi where he was editor of the Socialist Appeal and contributor to the Hindustan Standard. He spent two years in Hyderabad editing Mankind before returning to New Delhi where he began the critical journal Maral.

== Return to Sri Lanka ==
In 1959 Abhayavardhana married Kusala Fernando and returned to Sri Lanka in 1960.

Abhayavardhana is credited with formulating the classification of the Sri Lanka Freedom Party (SLFP) as a petty bourgeois party, which was the ideological and theoretical foundation of the LSSP Coalition with that party in 1964. After this, he promoted an alliance with the SLFP and the Communist Party, which finally emerged with the signing of the Common Programme of the United Front in 1968.

Abhayavardhana started The Nation as an English organ of the United Front, serving as its editor. When the United Front formed a government in 1970 Hector served as Chairman of the People's Bank under Dr. N.M. Perera, the Finance Minister. After the front broke up in 1975, he founded the Socialist Nation. He also served on the Educational Bureau of the LSSP and was a long-standing member of the Politburo.

In August 1992 Abhayavardhana, along with Vivienne Goonewardena and Bernard Soysa was a guest of honour at the 50th anniversary celebrations of the Quit India movement in New Delhi.

== Works ==
- Hector Abhayavardhana, Selected Writings, Colombo, Social Scientists Association, 2001.
