= Ruskin Fernando =

Sri Lankan businessperson (1916–1974)

Merennage Maurice Ruskin Fernando (12 December 1916 – 1974) was a Ceylonese businessman and politician.

He founded Lanka Weaving Mills and the Velona Group of Companies, one of the largest apparel manufacturers in the island.

He was elected from the Moratuwa electorate from the United National Party to the House of Representatives defeating Meryl Fernando in the 1960 March general elections. He was defeated in the 1960 July general elections by Meryl Fernando and was re-elected in the 1965 general elections defeating Meryl Fernando. He was in tune defeated in the 1970 general elections by Meryl Fernando The Ruskin Island in the Bolgoda lake, which was once owned by Ruskin Fernando is now named after him along with the Ruskin Fernando Mawatha (Road) in Moratuwa.
