= Ranga Dissanayake (judge) =

Sri Lankan judge

Director General of the Commission to Investigate Allegations of Bribery or Corruption
- Incumbent
- Assumed office 10 January 2025
- Appointed by: Anura Kumara Dissanayake
- Preceded by: W. K. D. Wijerathne

Judge of the High Court of Sri Lanka
- Incumbent
- Assumed office 2020

Personal details
- Born: Ranga Srinath Abeywickrama Dissanayake Sri Lanka
- Occupation: Judge
- Profession: Lawyer
- Known for: Director General of CIABOC

Ranga Srinath Abeywickrama Dissanayake is a Sri Lankan judge who has been Director General of the Commission to Investigate Allegations of Bribery or Corruption (CIABOC) since January 2025. A judge of the High Court, he holds the post on secondment.

== Career ==
Dissanayake took oaths as an attorney-at-law in 2000 and holds a postgraduate degree in law from the University of Colombo. He became a magistrate in 2005 and served in several courts, including as Colombo Chief Magistrate in 2018. Sitting as Fort Magistrate in February 2020, he acquitted a woman arrested at a brothel, holding that sex work in itself is not an offence under Sri Lankan law although keeping a brothel is. Citing earlier decisions including Saibo v Chellam, he said that "prostitution is not an offence per se under our law". The ruling was widely reported. He was appointed a judge of the High Court later in 2020, sitting at Monaragala and afterwards at Balapitiya and Negombo, and kept the office on secondment after moving to CIABOC.

== Director General of CIABOC ==
On 8 January 2025, President Anura Kumara Dissanayake appointed Dissanayake as Director General of CIABOC under Section 17(1) of the Anti-Corruption Act, No. 9 of 2023. He assumed duties on 10 January 2025. The Secretary to the President, Nandika Sanath Kumanayake, handed him the letter of appointment at the Presidential Secretariat. He succeeded W. K. D. Wijerathne, who had resigned in October 2024; the post had then been vacant for about three months.

=== Anti-corruption strategy ===
As Director General, Dissanayake oversaw the launch of a National Anti-Corruption Strategy and an accompanying five-year action plan, inaugurated on 9 April 2025 under President Anura Kumara Dissanayake. The strategy widened the Commission's role beyond investigation and prosecution to include prevention, public education and institutional capacity-building. One of the announced measures was a digital asset-and-liability declaration system, developed with support from the Asian Development Bank. He said public unfamiliarity with the law was one of the main weaknesses that allowed corruption, and that CIABOC was an independent institution rather than a government body.

In May 2025, CIABOC officers acting under his direction raided the headquarters of the Department of Motor Traffic in Colombo after public tip-offs. They arrested three officials, including a deputy commissioner, and recovered more than 4.1 million rupees in unexplained cash. Dissanayake said the action was meant as a deterrent and that both giving and taking bribes were offences.

=== Allegations of bias ===
From late 2025, Dissanayake faced allegations that he acted with political bias in favour of the governing National People's Power. In October 2025 he rejected claims that he was involved in active politics or linked to the Janatha Vimukthi Peramuna, calling them false and part of a campaign to damage the Commission's standing.

In May 2026, the Joint Opposition petitioned the CIABOC chairman, Justice Neil Iddawala, seeking Dissanayake's suspension and an inquiry into what it called his arbitrary and biased conduct. The petition relied in part on an affidavit by the late former SriLankan Airlines chief executive Kapila Chandrasena, who alleged that Dissanayake had pressured him to implicate former President Mahinda Rajapaksa and the MP Namal Rajapaksa in a corruption case. The allegations were not substantiated but affected the Commission's public standing. Dissanayake denied acting arbitrarily, saying in July 2026 that he exercised only the powers Parliament had granted under the Anti-Corruption Act and that CIABOC remained independent of the government.
