= Talawakelle Electoral District =

Electoral district of Sri Lanka

Talawakelle electoral district was an electoral district of Sri Lanka between August 1947 and March 1960. The district was named after the town of Talawakelle in Nuwara Eliya District, Central Province. The 1978 Constitution of Sri Lanka introduced the proportional representation electoral system for electing members of Parliament. The existing 160 mainly single-member electoral districts were replaced with 22 multi-member electoral districts. Talawakelle electoral district was replaced by the Nuwara Eliya multi-member electoral district at the 1989 general elections, the first under the proportional representation system, continues to be a polling division of the multi-member electoral district.

== Members of Parliament ==
Key

Independent SLFP UNP

Election	Member	Party	Term
1947	C. V. Velupillai	Ceylon India Congress	1947–1952
1952	H. E. P. de Mel	United National Party	1952–1956
1956	Kalyanaratne Hemachandra	United National Party	1956–1960

== Elections ==
=== 1947 Parliamentary General Election ===
Results of the 1st parliamentary election held between 23 August 1947 and 20 September 1947:

Candidate	Party	Symbol	Votes	%
C. V. Velupillai	Ceylon Indian Congress	Hand	10,645	78.65
P. M. Velchamy	Lanka Sama Samaja Party	Star	935	6.91
H. V. Ram Iswera	Independent	Bicycle	801	5.92
T. Sandanam	Independent	Elephant	684	5.05
Valid Votes			13,065	96.53
Rejected Votes			469	3.47
Total Polled			13,534	100.00
Registered Electors			19,299	
Turnout				70.13

=== 1952 Parliamentary General Election ===
Results of the 2nd parliamentary election held between 24 May 1952 and 30 May 1952:

Candidate	Party	Symbol	Votes	%
H. E. P. de Mel	United National Party	Star	1,198	54.11
Edmund Wanigasekera		Hand	846	38.21
Mohandas de Mel		Lamp	133	6.01
Valid Votes			2,177	98.33
Rejected Votes			37	1.67
Total Polled			2,214	100.00
Registered Electors			2,912	
Turnout				76.03

=== 1956 Parliamentary General Election ===
Results of the 3rd parliamentary election held between 5 April 1956 and 10 April 1956:

Candidate	Party	Symbol	Votes	%
Kalyanaratne Hemachandra	United National Party	Elephant	1,720	52.01
Edmund Wanigasekera	Sri Lanka Freedom Party	Hand	1,560	47.17
Valid Votes			3,280	99.18
Rejected Votes			27	0.82
Total Polled			3,307	100.00
Registered Electors			4,057	
Turnout				81.51
