= Nalaka de Silva =

Sri Lankan police officer

Nalaka de Silva is a Sri Lankan police officer. He was a Deputy Inspector General of Police and Director of the Terrorism Investigation Division (TID) of the Sri Lanka Police, when he was accused of plotting the assassination of several prominent persons including President Sirisena. He has been remanded during the investigation in to the allegation; having been arrested in September 2018, he was interdict from service in October 2018.

He was granted bail in May 2019. It was reported that he was investigating the chief suspect of the 2019 Sri Lanka Easter bombings at the time of his arrest, having gained an open warrant.
