= Moratuwa Electoral District =

Electoral district of Sri Lanka

Moratuwa electoral district was an electoral district of Sri Lanka between August 1947 and February 1989. The district was named after the city of Moratuwa in Colombo District, Western Province. The 1978 Constitution of Sri Lanka introduced the proportional representation electoral system for electing members of Parliament. The existing 160 mainly single-member electoral districts were replaced with 22 multi-member electoral districts. Moratuwa electoral district was replaced by the Colombo multi-member electoral district at the 1989 general elections, the first under the PR system, though Moratuwa continues to be a polling division of the multi-member electoral district.

== Members of Parliament ==
Key

Independent LSSP SLFP UNP

Election	Member	Party	Term
1947	Somaweera Chandrasiri	LSSP	1947–1952
1952	Somaweera Chandrasiri	LSSP	1952–1956
1956	T. W. Merril Fernando	LSSP	1956–1960
1960	M. Ruskin Fernando	UNP	1960-1960
1960	T. W. Merril Fernando	LSSP	1960–1965
1965	M. Ruskin Fernando	UNP	1965–1970
1970	Wimalasiri de Mel	LSSP	1970–1977
1977	Tyronne Fernando	UNP	1977–1989

== Elections ==
=== 1947 Parliamentary General Election ===
Results of the 1st parliamentary election held between 23 August 1947 and 20 September 1947 for the district:

Candidate	Party	Symbol	Votes	%
Somaweera Chandrasiri	Lanka Sama Samaja Party	Hand	13,464	48.15%
T. Amarasuriya		Chair	9,547	33.58
Darrel Peiris	Independent	Lamp	3,523	12.39
Watson Fernando		Star	722	2.54
A. C. W. Peiris		Spoon	494	1.74
Gilbert Perera		Elephant	210	0.74
Valid Votes			27,960	98.36
Rejected Votes			467	1.64
Total Polled			28,427	100.00
Registered Electors			57,723	
Turnout				49.25

=== 1952 Parliamentary General Election ===
Results of the 2nd parliamentary election held between 24 May 1952 and 30 May 1952 for the district:

Candidate	Party	Symbol	Votes	%
Somaweera Chandrasiri	Lanka Sama Samaja Party	Elephant	16,125	40.75
Jermyn G. Fernando		Hand	12,741	32.20
D. D. Abeysinghe		Star	10,283	25.99
Valid Votes			39,149	98.65
Rejected Votes			417	1.05
Total Polled			39,566	100.00
Registered Electors			55,090	
Turnout				71.82

=== 1956 Parliamentary General Election ===
Results of the 3rd parliamentary election held between 5 April 1956 and 10 April 1956 for the district:

Candidate	Party	Symbol	Votes	%
Meryl Fernando	Lanka Sama Samaja Party	Key	19,529	48.20
H. E. P. de Mel	United National Party	Elephant	11,811	29.15
Somaweera Chandrasiri	Independent	Flower	6,559	16.19
M. Vincent Perera		Aeroplane	2,267	5.60
M. S. Oliver Stembo		Chair	166	0.41
Valid Votes			40,332	99.51
Rejected Votes			187	0.49
Total Polled			40,519	100.00
Registered Electors			60,395	
Turnout				67.09

=== 1960 (March) Parliamentary General Election ===
Results of the 4th parliamentary election held on 19 March 1960 for the district:

Candidate	Party	Symbol	Votes	%
M. Ruskin Fernando	United National Party	Elephant	10,262	42.14
Meryl Fernando		Key	9,427	38.71
Nina Wijesuriya		Lamp	2,137	8.78
Watson Fernando	Communist Party	Star	1,091	4.48
Leonard de Mel		Ship	648	2.66
P. J. D. Rodrigo		Umbrella	355	1.46
S. O. Stembo		Saw	197	0.81
Samuel P. C. Fernando		Sun	90	0.37
Vinnie de Silva		Pair of Scales	0.27	
Valid Votes			24,272	99.66
Rejected Votes			82	0.34
Total Polled			24,354	100.00
Registered Electors			32,413	
Turnout				75.14

=== 1960 (July) Parliamentary General Election ===
Results of the 5th parliamentary election held on 20 July 1960 for the district:

Candidate	Party	Symbol	Votes	%
Meryl Fernando	Lanka Sama Samaja Party	Key	12,943	51.59
M. Ruskin Fernando	United National Party	Elephant	11,593	46.21
Mohandas de Mel		Cart Wheel	485	1.93
Valid Votes			25,021	99.74
Rejected Votes			66	0.26
Total Polled			25,087	100.00
Registered Electors			32,413	
Turnout				77.40

=== 1965 Parliamentary General Election ===
Results of the 6th parliamentary election held on 22 March 1965 for the district:

Candidate	Party	Symbol	Votes	%
M. Ruskin Fernando	United National Party	Elephant	18,059	51.26
Kusala Abhayawardhana	Lanka Sama Samaja Party	Key	16,020	45.47
Meryl Fernando		Lamp	1,048	2.98
Valid Votes			35,127	99.71
Rejected Votes			102	0.29
Total Polled			35,229	100.00
Registered Electors			44,955	
Turnout				78.37

=== 1970 Parliamentary General Election ===
Results of the 7th parliamentary election held on 27 May 1970 for the district:

Candidate	Party	Symbol	Votes	%
Wimalasiri De Mel	Lanka Sama Samaja Party	Key	24,672	54.52
M. Ruskin Fernando	United National Party	Elephant	20,258	44.77
G. K. Nina Wijesuriya		Bell	252	0.56
Valid Votes			45,182	99.85
Rejected Votes			68	0.15
Total Polled			45,250	100.00
Registered Electors			54,188	
Turnout				83.51

=== 1977 Parliamentary General Election ===
Results of the 8th parliamentary election held on 21 July 1977 for the district:

Candidate	Party	Symbol	Votes	%
Tyronne Fernando		Elephant	28,488	54.21
Douglas Fernano		Hand	13,614	25.91
Wimalasiri De Mel		Key	7,000	13.32
Meryl Fernando		Lamp	2,891	5.50
P. F. Calistus Perera		Chair	112	0.21
A. Francis Fernando		Umbrella	111	0.21
Nina Wijesuriya		Bell	86	0.16
Valid Votes			52,302	99.52
Rejected Votes			250	0.48
Total Polled			52,552	100.00
Registered Electors			64,190	
Turnout				81.87
