= Gamini Lokuge =

Sri Lankan politician (1943–2025)

Hon. Gamini Lokuge
- ගාමිණී ලොකුගේ காமினி லோகுகே
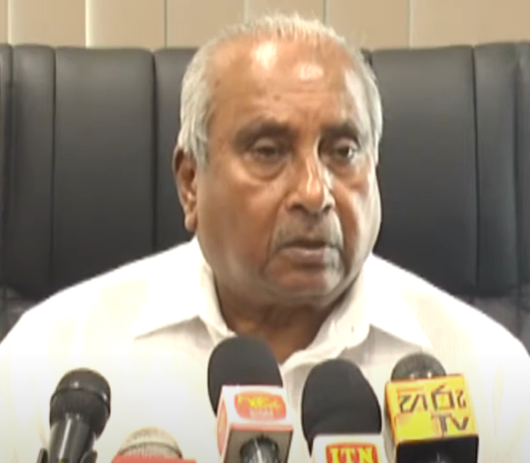
- Lokuge in 2019

Minister of Energy
- In office 3 March 2022 – 3 April 2022
- President: Gotabaya Rajapaksa
- Prime Minister: Mahinda Rajapaksa
- Preceded by: Udaya Gammanpila
- Succeeded by: Kanchana Wijesekera (Note: As Minister of Power and Energy)

Minister of Power
- In office 16 August 2021 – 3 March 2022
- President: Gotabaya Rajapaksa
- Prime Minister: Mahinda Rajapaksa
- Preceded by: Dullas Alahapperuma
- Succeeded by: Pavithra Wanniarachchi

Minister of Transport
- In office 12 August 2020 – 16 August 2021
- President: Gotabaya Rajapaksa
- Prime Minister: Mahinda Rajapaksa
- Preceded by: Mahinda Amaraweera
- Succeeded by: Pavithra Wanniarachchi

Minister of State for Urban Development
- In office 27 November 2019 – 12 August 2020
- President: Gotabaya Rajapaksa
- Prime Minister: Mahinda Rajapaksa
- Minister: Mahinda Rajapaksa
- Succeeded by: Nalaka Godahewa

Minister of Labour
- In office 9 November 2018 – 15 December 2018
- President: Maithripala Sirisena
- Prime Minister: Mahinda Rajapaksa
- Deputy: Manusha Nanayakkara
- Preceded by: Ravindra Samaraweera
- Succeeded by: Daya Gamage
- In office 23 April 2010 – 12 January 2015
- President: Mahinda Rajapaksa
- Prime Minister: D. M. Jayaratne
- Preceded by: Athauda Seneviratne
- Succeeded by: S. B. Nawinne

Minister for Sports and Public Recreation
- In office 28 January 2007 – 23 April 2010
- President: Mahinda Rajapaksa
- Prime Minister: Ratnasiri Wickremanayake
- Preceded by: Jeewan Kumaranatunga
- Succeeded by: C. B. Rathnayake

Minister of Tourism
- In office 12 December 2001 – 8 April 2004
- President: Chandrika Kumaratunga
- Prime Minister: Ranil Wickremesinghe
- Preceded by: Lakshman Kiriella
- Succeeded by: Anura Bandaranaike

Member of Parliament for Colombo
- In office 9 March 1989 – 24 September 2024

Member of Parliament for Kesbewa
- In office 18 May 1983 – 20 December 1988
- Preceded by: Dharmasena Attygalle
- Majority: 27,821

Personal details
- Born: Gamini Kulawansa Lokuge; 8 May 1943 British Ceylon (now Sri Lanka)
- Died: 30 June 2025 (aged 82) Colombo, Sri Lanka
- Party: SLPP (2019–2025)
- Other political affiliations: SLPFA (2019–2022); UPFA (2007–2019); UNP (1960–2007)
- Education: Ananda Sastralaya, Kotte
- Occupation: Politician
- Profession: Businessman

Gamini Kulawansa Lokuge (Sinhala: ගාමිණී ලොකුගේ, Tamil: காமினி லோகுகே; 8 May 1943 – 30 June 2025) was a Sri Lankan politician. He was a member of the Parliament of Sri Lanka for the Colombo Electoral District between 1989 and 2024, and had previously represented Kesbewa in the National State Assembly from 1983 to 1989. Throughout his time in Sri Lankan politics, Lokuge held many different cabinet positions, such as Minister of Power, Minister of Energy, Minister of Transport, Minister of Labour, Minister of Sports and Minister of Tourism, among many others, through many national governments. He also served as the President of the National Employees Union as well as the head of the United National Party’s Public Service Trade Union.

== Early life ==
Lokuge was born on 8 May 1943 in Sri Lanka (then British Ceylon). He received his primary education at Ananda Sastralaya in Sri Jayawardenepura Kotte.

== Political career ==
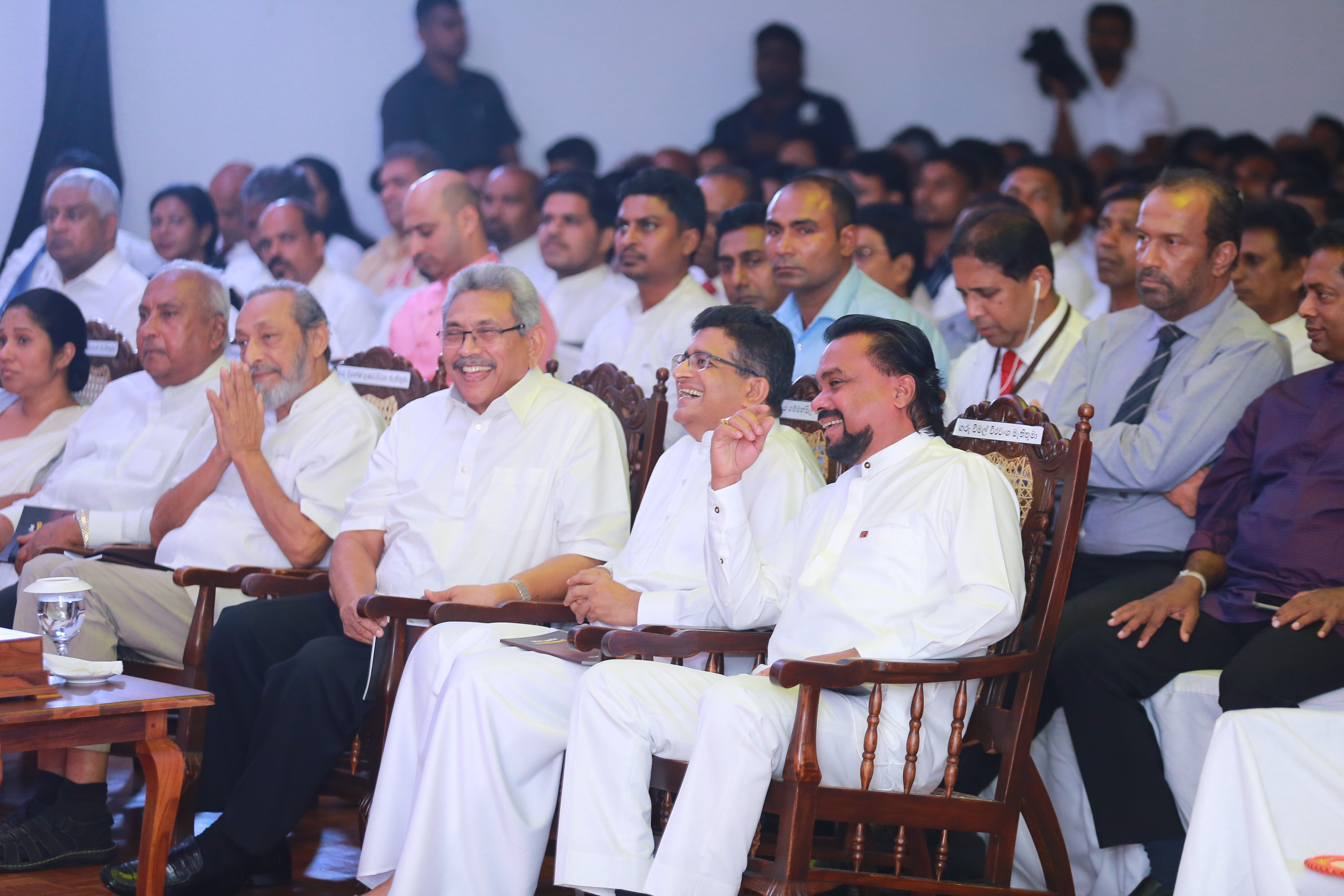
Gamini Lokuge with President Gotabaya Rajapaksa and other members of the Sri Lanka Podujana Peramuna

Lokuge entered politics in 1960 as a member of the United National Party (UNP). He contested his first election in 1983 and was elected to represent the Kesbewa Electorate with a clear majority of 27,821 votes. During his stint as MP for Kesbewa, he advocated for investments in schools and funding for temples in his electorate. In 1989, President Ranasinghe Premadasa appointed Lokuge as the Minister of State for Tourism. Following the UNP’s defeat in the 1994 general election, he served on the opposition benches.

In 2002, after the UNP regained a parliamentary plurality in the previous year, he was appointed Minister of Tourism under the government of President Chandrika Kumaratunga. In 2006, Lokuge crossed the floor and joined the government of President Mahinda Rajapaksa. Following his defection, he was appointed to several senior cabinet posts, including the Minister for Sports and Public Recreation in 2007 and Minister of Labour in 2010. He held the labour portfolio until 2015, when Rajapaksa was defeated in that year’s presidential election. Subsequently, Lokuge joined the Joint Opposition, opposing the presidency of Maithripala Sirisena. Lokuge and other members of the Joint Opposition who were loyal to Mahinda Rajapaksa then proceeded to form the Sri Lanka Podujana Peramuna (SLPP) to contest future elections.

During the 2018 constitutional crisis, Lokuge briefly returned to the cabinet and was sworn in as the Minister of Labour, Foreign Employment, and Petroleum Resources Development. He held this position until rulings from the Supreme Court and no-confidence motions tabled in parliament led to the dissolution of the Sirisena–Rajapaksa-led government.

In the wake of the election of Gotabaya Rajapaksa as president in 2019, Lokuge was appointed Minister of State for Urban Development. Following the SLPP’s decisive victory in the 2020 general elections, he was appointed as the Minister of Transport and was appointed to the Legislative Standing Committee. In 2021, during a cabinet reshuffle, President Gotabaya Rajapaksa appointed him Minister of Power. During his stint as Minister of Energy, he proposed an expansion of the nation's power plant network and engaged in the possibility of connecting Sri Lanka's electric grid with India as well as Singapore.

In 2022, a deepening economic crisis marked by prolonged power cuts, some lasting for 13 hours at one point, occurred. Lokuge was appointed Minister of Power on March 3 of that year, replacing Udaya Gammanpila, who was dismissed for criticizing government policy during the crisis. However, as public unrest grew and large-scale protests erupted against the SLPP-led government, Lokuge resigned along with the rest of the cabinet on April 3.

The political turmoil had dire personal consequences for Lokuge. His driver was killed by demonstrators, and during the violent protests on 9 May 2022, his house was set on fire, though he would later gain compensation from the government for this. He was not given a cabinet post in the subsequent Ranil Wickremesinghe government, and he instead dedicated his time to organizing internal party responsibilities. Citing health concerns, Lokuge did not contest the 2024 general election from the Colombo District and was instead named in the SLPP’s National list; however, he was never nominated to the 17th Parliament.

=== Controversies ===
In May 1983, the Aththa newspaper published a series of reports alleging widespread electoral malpractice and abuse of state resources during the parliamentary election campaign in the Kesbewa electorate, where Lokuge was the UNP candidate. The newspaper alleged in its reports that vehicles used by the UNP in its campaign were allegedly, fitted with fake number plates, some of which matched registration numbers of decommissioned government vehicles, including a jeep which was found to have belonged to the Headquarters of the Anti-Malaria Campaign, a government agency.

The reports further allege that UNP supporters engaged in acts of violence and threats of intimidation against Sri Lanka Freedom Party election observers and supporters at polling stations in areas of the electorate. Many of these supporters and party organizers were reportedly arrested on what the paper described as false charges in the lead-up to the election in Kesbewa. The Aththa newspaper also reported in its paper how the UNP was allegedly engaging in vote-rigging efforts. This is through including claims that government employees and individuals from outside the electorate were brought into Kesbewa to influence the outcome of the vote. It can be pointed out that despite Lokuge winning in the electorate, no formal charges were ever brought against him or any other member of the United National Party in connection with the allegations.

In 2011, Lokuge became involved in a dispute with fellow minister Mahindananda Aluthgamage over allegations that, during his time as Sports Minister, he had entered into a ten-year agreement with the Board of Control for Cricket in India permitting Sri Lankan cricketers to participate in the Indian Premier League over national service. Lokuge strongly rejected the allegations.

During his tenure as the labour minister under President Mahinda Rajapaksa, reforms were introduced to the state Employees’ Pension Fund which would have allowed private sector employees to receive a pension. Public sector employees and trade union activists argued that the proposed amendment bill was brought without consultation, this eventually led to protests. One protest centred around the Katunayake Free Trade Zone, saw police fire into protesters, killing one and injuring many others.

In 2021, Lokuge allegedly directly intervened to lift lockdown restrictions, placed on the city of Piliyandala. Lokuge was strongly condemned by medical personnel in the country for harming the country’s Covid-19 response, as the restrictions were imposed to stop the spread of the illness.

== Death ==
Lokuge died on 30 June 2025, at the age of 82, while receiving treatment at a private hospital in Colombo.

His remains were placed on display at his private residence for public viewing from 1 July to 3 July. His funeral took place on 3 July, at the Dole Kanatta Public Cemetery in Piliyandala.
