= C. V. Velupillai =

Ceylonese trade unionist, politician and poet

Cannappen Velusingham Velupillai (14 September 1914 – 19 November 1984) was a Ceylonese trade unionist, politician and poet.

Velupillai was born on 14 September 1914 in Madakumbura, the son of a relatively wealthy Kangani family. He received his education at the St. Xavier's College, Nuwara Eliya, Hatton Methodist College (now Highlands College), and Nalanda College, Colombo.

Velupillai joined the Plantation Trade Union Movement and was inspired by Gandhism ideology and the Tagore school of thought. In 1943 when Rabindranath Tagore visited Ceylon, Velupillai met him and gave him a book of his poetry, Vismadgene, that he had dedicated to Tagore.

At the 1st parliamentary election, held on 16 September 1947, Velupillai contested the Talawakelle electorate, as the Ceylon India Congress (CIC) candidate. He polled 10,645 votes (78.65% of the total vote), with the other three Tamil candidates equally sharing the remaining votes. He was one of seven CIC candidates who were elected to that first parliament. He contested the Nuwara Eliya electorate in the 1970 parliamentary election and came third after Gamini Dissanayake and T. William Fernando.

== Bibliography ==
- Velupillai, C. V. (1956). In Ceylon's Tea Garden. Colombo: Harrison Peiris.
- Velupillai, C. V. (1970). Born to Labour. Colombo: M. D. Gunasena and Co.
