= Commission to Investigate Allegations of Bribery or Corruption =

Sri Lankan anti-corruption commission

Commission to Investigate Allegations of Bribery or Corruption අල්ලස් හෝ දූෂණ චෝදනා විමර්ශන කොමිෂන් සභාව (Sinhala) இலஞ்சம் அல்லது ஊழல் பற்றிய சார்த்துதல்களைப் புலனாய்வு செய்வதற்கான ஆணைக்குழு (Tamil)
- Abbreviation: CIABOC

Agency overview
- Formed: 1994; 32 years ago
- Preceding agency: Bribery Commissioner's Department

Jurisdictional structure
- Operations jurisdiction: Sri Lanka
- Constituting instrument: Anti-Corruption Act, No. 9 of 2023
- Specialist jurisdiction: Anti-corruption

Operational structure
- Headquarters: No. 36, Malalasekera Mawatha, Colombo 07, Sri Lanka
- Agency executives: Justice W. M. N. P. Iddawala, Chairman; Ranga Dissanayake, Director General

Website
- ciaboc.gov.lk

The Commission to Investigate Allegations of Bribery or Corruption (CIABOC), commonly known as the Bribery Commission, is the principal anti-corruption agency of Sri Lanka. It is an independent commission responsible for investigating, prosecuting and preventing bribery and corruption in the public and private sectors, and for administering the declaration of assets and liabilities by public officials.

First established as a permanent body in 1994, the commission operates under the Anti-Corruption Act, No. 9 of 2023, which widened its mandate and was passed partly to give effect to the United Nations Convention against Corruption.

== History ==
=== Background ===
Bribery was first made a statutory offence in Ceylon by the Penal Code Ordinance, No. 2 of 1883. Several commissions of inquiry examined bribery in the 1940s, among them the L. M. D. de Silva Commission (1941), the Keuneman Commission (1948), which recommended a separate department to investigate bribery, and the M. W. H. de Silva Commission (1949). A dedicated statute, the Bribery Act, No. 11 of 1954, followed, and the Bribery (Amendment) Act, No. 40 of 1958 created the office of the Bribery Commissioner and the Bribery Commissioner's Department, which took over bribery investigations and became the direct predecessor of CIABOC. Later amendments broadened the law: the Declaration of Assets and Liabilities Law, No. 1 of 1975 brought asset declarations within the Commissioner's remit, and the Bribery (Amendment) Act, No. 20 of 1994 introduced corruption as a separate offence and provided for the forfeiture of property on conviction.

=== Establishment ===
The commission to Investigate Allegations of Bribery or Corruption Act, No. 19 of 1994 established CIABOC as a permanent, independent commission to succeed the Bribery Commissioner's Department. It was given powers to investigate complaints of bribery and corruption and to direct prosecutions, and the prosecution of Bribery Act cases was transferred to it. The commission was later empowered to act on its own initiative (ex mero motu) under Article 156A of the Constitution.

=== Reform under the 2023 Act ===
Sri Lanka's anti-corruption laws were consolidated by the Anti-Corruption Act, No. 9 of 2023, which came into force on 15 September 2023. The Act repealed and replaced three earlier laws: the Bribery Act of 1954, the CIABOC Act, No. 19 of 1994, and the Declaration of Assets and Liabilities Law of 1975. It reconstituted the commission with greater independence and a wider mandate, and the first Commission under the new Act began work on 1 January 2024.

== Legal framework ==
The Anti-Corruption Act, No. 9 of 2023 is the primary anti-corruption law in Sri Lanka and sets out the commission's powers. Among its provisions are:

- powers to investigate and prosecute bribery and corruption in both the public and private sectors;
- offences including bribery, illicit enrichment, money laundering, the bribery of foreign public officials, private-sector bribery and corporate criminal liability;
- a requirement for public officials to declare their assets and liabilities, including those held outside Sri Lanka, with penalties for false or late declarations;
- power to issue freezing orders over property, which are valid for seven days unless confirmed and extended by the High Court;
- forfeiture of property derived from corruption;
- protection for informants, whistleblowers and witnesses who assist the commission.

The Commission functions independently of any government ministry or department. Its members are appointed by the President on the recommendation of the Constitutional Council, and may be removed only by the President following an address of Parliament, on grounds of proved misconduct or incapacity. The salaries of members are charged to the Consolidated Fund, which protects the commission from executive financial control. When it reviewed the 2023 Bill, the Supreme Court held that the sovereignty of the people under Article 3 of the Constitution "includes the right to a Government free of bribery or corruption", and said the independence of the commission was of fundamental importance.

== Composition ==
The Commission consists of three members appointed by the President on the recommendation of the Constitutional Council: one with at least twenty years' experience in law, and two with at least twenty years' experience in fields such as crime investigation and law enforcement, forensic auditing or public administration. One member is designated chairman. As of 2026, the chairman is Justice W. M. N. P. Iddawala, and the other members are K. B. Rajapakse and Chethiya Goonesekera, PC. The administrative and prosecutorial work of the commission is led by a Director General, appointed by the President on the Constitutional Council's recommendation for a single five-year term. Since January 2025 the office has been held by Ranga Dissanayake, a High Court judge serving on secondment.

== Functions ==
The commission's mandate covers the investigation, prosecution and prevention of bribery and corruption. Under the 2023 Act its remit was widened beyond the traditional bribery offences to cover money laundering, the bribery of foreign public officials, private-sector bribery and corporate criminal liability, together with the administration of asset and liability declarations by public officials.

The commission also carries out preventive and educational work. In April 2025 it launched a National Anti-Corruption Strategy and a five-year action plan, which broadened its emphasis to include prevention, public legal education and institutional capacity-building, and announced a digital asset-and-liability declaration system developed with support from the Asian Development Bank.

== Notable cases ==
In December 2019, following a CIABOC investigation, the Permanent High Court Trial-at-Bar convicted I. H. K. Mahanama, a former chief of staff to President Maithripala Sirisena, and Piyadasa Dissanayake, a former chairman of the State Timber Corporation, of soliciting and accepting a bribe in connection with a deal over the Kantale sugar factory. Mahanama was sentenced to 20 years' imprisonment and Dissanayake to 12 years. The Supreme Court upheld the convictions in 2023.

In May 2025, CIABOC officers raided the headquarters of the Department of Motor Traffic in Colombo after public tip-offs, arresting three officials, including a deputy commissioner, and recovering more than 4.1 million rupees in unexplained cash.

In November 2025, in Weihana v. CIABOC, the Supreme Court set out the framework governing the commission's freezing-order powers under the 2023 Act, holding that such orders are temporary investigative tools subject to confirmation and supervision by the High Court.

== See also ==
- Ranga Dissanayake (judge)
- Corruption in Sri Lanka
- Anti-Corruption Act, No. 9 of 2023
- United Nations Convention against Corruption
