= Wimalasiri de Mel =

Sri Lankan politician (1926–2010)

Wimalasiri De Mel (1926 - 2010) was a Sri Lankan Trotskyist revolutionary politician. He was a member of parliament from Moratuwa.

De Mel was engaged in social service from a young age. He became the secretary of a Society formed by Senator Sam P. C. Fernando. He contested and was elected to the Moratuwa Urbarn Council from the United Socialist Front and played an active role in the 1953 Ceylonese Hartal. A long standing member of the Lanka Sama Samaja Party, he served as its general secretary. He contested the 1970 general election from the LSSP and was elected from the Moratuwa electorate. He unsuccessfully contested the 1977 general election from Moratuwa. He died on 31 October 2010 and his body was donated to the National Ayurveda Hospital per his wishes.
