= Dharmasena Attygalle =

Sri Lankan politician

Hon. Dr Dharmasena Attygalle

Member of Parliament for Kesbewa
- In office 1972–1982
- Preceded by: Somaweera Chandrasiri
- Succeeded by: Gamini Lokuge

Personal details
- Born: 19 February 1925 Madapatha, Sri Lanka
- Died: 1 June 1989 (aged 64)
- Party: United National Party
- Education: Madapatha Buddhist Mixed School, Piliyandala Maha Vidyalaya, Nalanda College, Colombo, Ayurvedic Medical College
- Occupation: Politics
- Profession: Ayurveda practitioner

Dr Dharmasena Attygalle (19 February 1925 – 1 June 1989) was an MP in Sri Lanka's parliament from 1972 to 1982.

He served as the Deputy Minister of Health (1977–1980) and Minister of Indigenous Medicine (1980–1982) representing the Kesbewa electorate.

He was appointed as High Commissioner to Pakistan in January 1983.

He was an Ayurveda practitioner by profession and was educated at Nalanda College Colombo.

== See also ==
- Sri Lankan Non Career Diplomats
