= Sri Lanka Guardian =

Sri Lankan news website

- Website type: Online Newspaper
- Available in: English, Sinhala
- Founders: Nilantha Ilangamuwa, Victor Karunairajan
- Editors: Eric Bailey, Windya Gamlath
- Website: www.slguardian.org
- Launched: August 2007
- Current status: Active

Sri Lanka Guardian is Sri Lankan news website known for its independent news coverage. It has been banned in Sri Lanka along with other websites for this criticism of the Sri Lankan government and officials and its investigative journalism. It released a video showing Sri Lankan army female recruits being abused and tortured; the Sri Lankan army accepted the authenticity of the video and ordered an inquiry.
