= Meryl Fernando =

Ceylonese teacher, trade unionist, politician and Member of Parliament

Hon. Meryl Fernando

Member of the Ceylonese Parliament for Moratuwa
- In office 1956–1960
- Preceded by: Chandrasiri Somaweera
- Succeeded by: Ruskin Fernando
- In office 1960–1965
- Preceded by: Ruskin Fernando
- Succeeded by: Ruskin Fernando

Personal details
- Born: 18 April 1923
- Died: 27 May 2007 (aged 84) Moratuwa, Sri Lanka
- Profession: Teacher
- Ethnicity: Sinhalese

Weerahennedige Theodore Wilfred Meryl Fernando (18 April 1923 – 27 May 2007) was a Ceylonese teacher, trade unionist, politician and Member of Parliament.

== Early life and family ==
Fernando was born on 18 April 1923. He was educated at Prince of Wales' College, Moratuwa. After school he joined Ceylon University College in 1941, passing the London intermediate examination in 1944. Later he studied at the Teacher Training College in Maharagama and qualified as a teacher.

Fernando was married twice - to Christobel and Wimala. He had two children - Sharmalie Nimalka Nagle and Arosha.

== Career ==
Fernando became involved in politics whilst at university and in 1944 dropped out of university to work full-time for the Ceylonese branch of the Bolshevik–Leninist Party of India, Ceylon and Burma (BLPI). He met Edmund Samarakkody, with whom he would be politically associated with for most of his life, whilst working for the BLPI. After World War II Fernando organised labour at the Elephant match-factory in Moratuwa. He worked for the Moratuwa branch of the Kelaniya Match Workers Union for two decades and served as the branch's secretary for several years. In 1948 he got the carpentry workers at Willorawatta, Moratuwa, to join the Industrial and General Workers Union, an affiliate of the Lanka Sama Samaja Party (LSSP)). Fernando and Doric de Souza successfully negotiated better employment conditions for the carpentry workers. Fernando also organised workers at the Velona Garment Factory and the Lanka Light Match Factory in Moratuwa. Fernando was arrested and imprisoned during the 1953 hartal.

In 1948 the BLPI merged with the Congress Socialist Party to create the Socialist Party. The BLPI's Ceylon branch became a separate party, the Bolshevik Samasamaja Party (BSP). The BSP and LSSP merged in 1950. Fernando was elected to Moratuwa Urban Council in 1950 as the LSSP member for Koralawella Ward. He was a member of Moratuwa Urban Council until 1967 and served as its chairman. He stood as the LSSP candidate in Moratuwa at the 1956 parliamentary election. He won the election and entered Parliament. He did not have a car and traveled to Parliament by bus. He lost his seat at the March 1960 parliamentary election but re-gained it at the July 1960 parliamentary election.

Whilst Ceylon's main political parties, the United National Party (UNP) and Sri Lanka Freedom Party (SLFP), supported the Sinhala Only Act, the leftists, led by the LSSP, opposed the act. In May 1960 LSSP leader N. M. Perera proposed that the party form a coalition government with SLFP. The LSSP joined the SLFP government in June 1964. LSSP members who opposed the move (Fernando, V. Karalasingham, Samarakkody, Bala Tampoe etc.) left the LSSP and formed the Lanka Sama Samaja Party (Revolutionary) (LSSP(R)) with Samarakkody as its secretary. In December 1964 the LSSP(R)'s two MPs, Fernando and Samarakkody, together with several rebel SLFP MPs, voted for an opposition amendment to the government's throne speech, defeating the government and precipitating the dissolution of Parliament. Fernando and Samarakkody's action proved controversial within the LSSP(R) as they had in effect supported the capitalist UNP which would go on to win the 1965 parliamentary election. The LSSP(R) supported Fernando and Samarakkody's action but some members who opposed it (Karalasingham and the Sakthi group) left the LSSP(R) and rejoined the LSSP in 1966.

Fernando stood as the LSSP(R) candidate in Moratuwa at the 1965 parliamentary election but failed to get re-elected. Samarakkody fell out with LSSP(R) leader Tampoe and in 1968 left the party, together with Fernando, and founded the Revolutionary Sama Samaja Party (renamed Revolutionary Workers Party in 1973). Fernando supported the Janatha Vimukthi Peramuna's 1971 insurrection. Fernando stood as a candidate in Moratuwa at the 1977 parliamentary election but again failed to get re-elected. He took an active role in the 1980 general strike.

Fernando died on 27 May 2007 at his home in Koralawella, Moratuwa.

== Electoral history ==
Electoral history of Meryl Fernando
Election	Constituency	Party	Votes	Result
1956 parliamentary	Moratuwa	LSSP	19,529	Elected
1960 March parliamentary	Moratuwa	LSSP	9,427	Not elected
1960 July parliamentary	Moratuwa	LSSP	12,943	Elected
1965 parliamentary	Moratuwa	LSSP(R)	1,048	Not elected
1977 parliamentary	Moratuwa		2,891	Not elected
