= List of prime ministers of Sri Lanka =

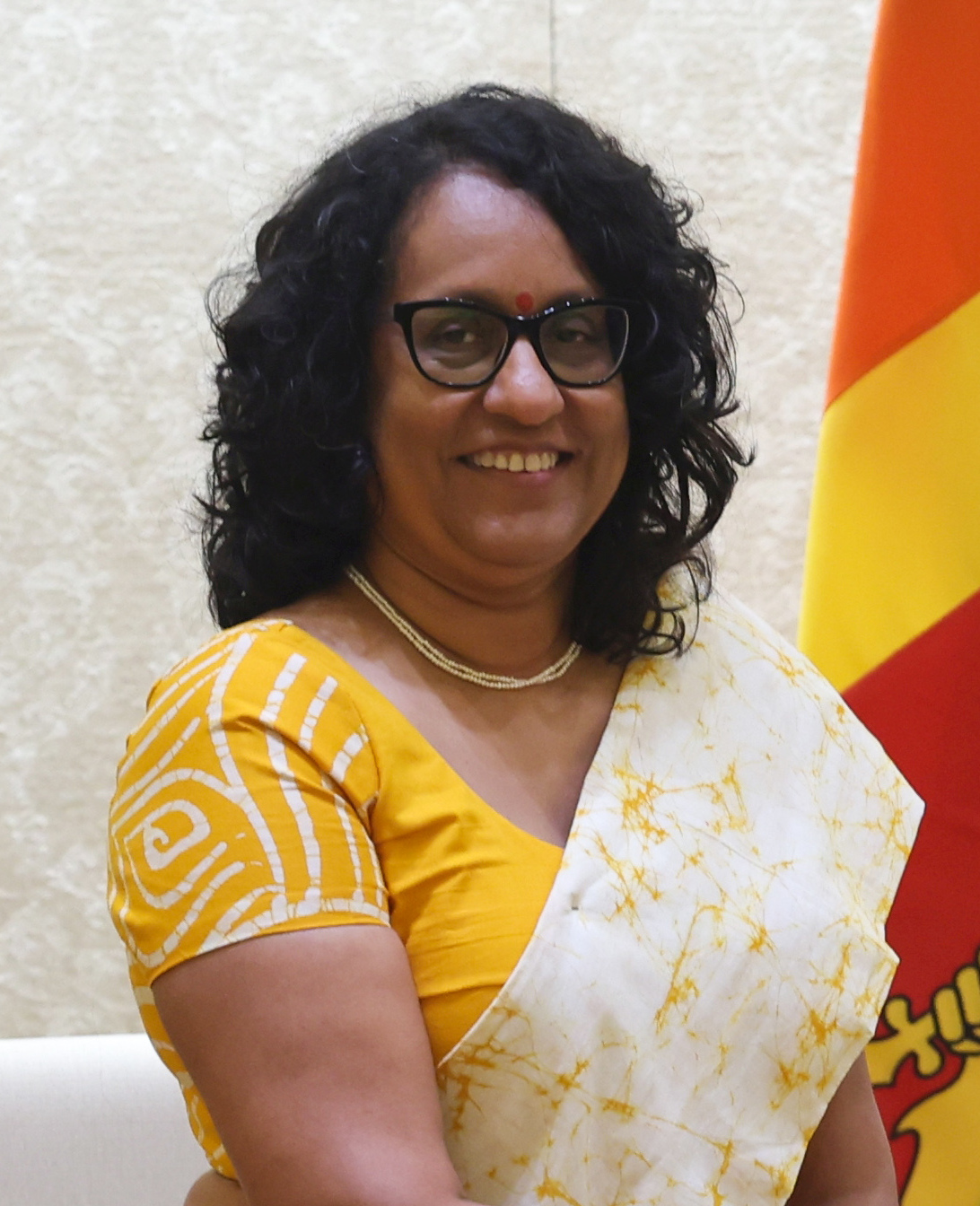
The incumbent prime minister of Sri Lanka and the third woman to hold the office, Harini Amarasuriya

There have been sixteen prime ministers of Sri Lanka since the creation of the position in 1947, prior to the independence of the country (then known as Ceylon). The prime minister of Ceylon was the head of the government until 1972. In 1972, the country was renamed as the Free, Sovereign and Independent Republic of Sri Lanka, and the position was known as the prime minister of Sri Lanka from then onwards. The prime minister also held the unified Ministry of External Affairs and Defence until 1977, when the government of J. R. Jayewardene split the ministry into two ministries, forming the Ministry of Defence and the Ministry of Foreign Affairs.

In 1978, after Jayewardene became the president, new constitutional changes were introduced. The position of the executive president was introduced, resulting in the powers of the prime minister being reduced. The president became the head of state and chief executive, and the prime minister became a weak head of government.

Under the current constitution of Sri Lanka, the prime minister is the leader of the Cabinet business and also functions as a deputy to the president. In the event a president dies in office, the prime minister becomes the acting president until the Parliament convenes to elect a successor or new elections can be held to elect a new president. Such was the case in 1993, when President Ranasinghe Premadasa was assassinated and Prime Minister Dingiri Banda Wijetunga took office as president.

On 28 April 2015, the Parliament approved the 19th Amendment to the Constitution of Sri Lanka which gives the power of the government to the prime minister, while the president remains the head of state, head of the Cabinet, and commander-in-chief.

Of the sixteen prime ministers who have held the office since the introduction of the position in 1947, one has held the office four times, two have held office thrice, and two have held office twice. Six prime ministers have gone on to become president of the country.

Ranil Wickremesinghe has been sworn in as prime minister the most times in the country's history, on six occasions (May 1993, December 2001, January 2015, August 2015, December 2018 and May 2022), whilst Dudley Senanayake and Sirimavo Bandaranayake have each been appointed three times. Mahinda Rajapaksa is the only prime minister who was suspended from his duties by the Supreme Court, becoming the first and only de facto prime minister of Sri Lanka in 2018.

Notable prime ministers
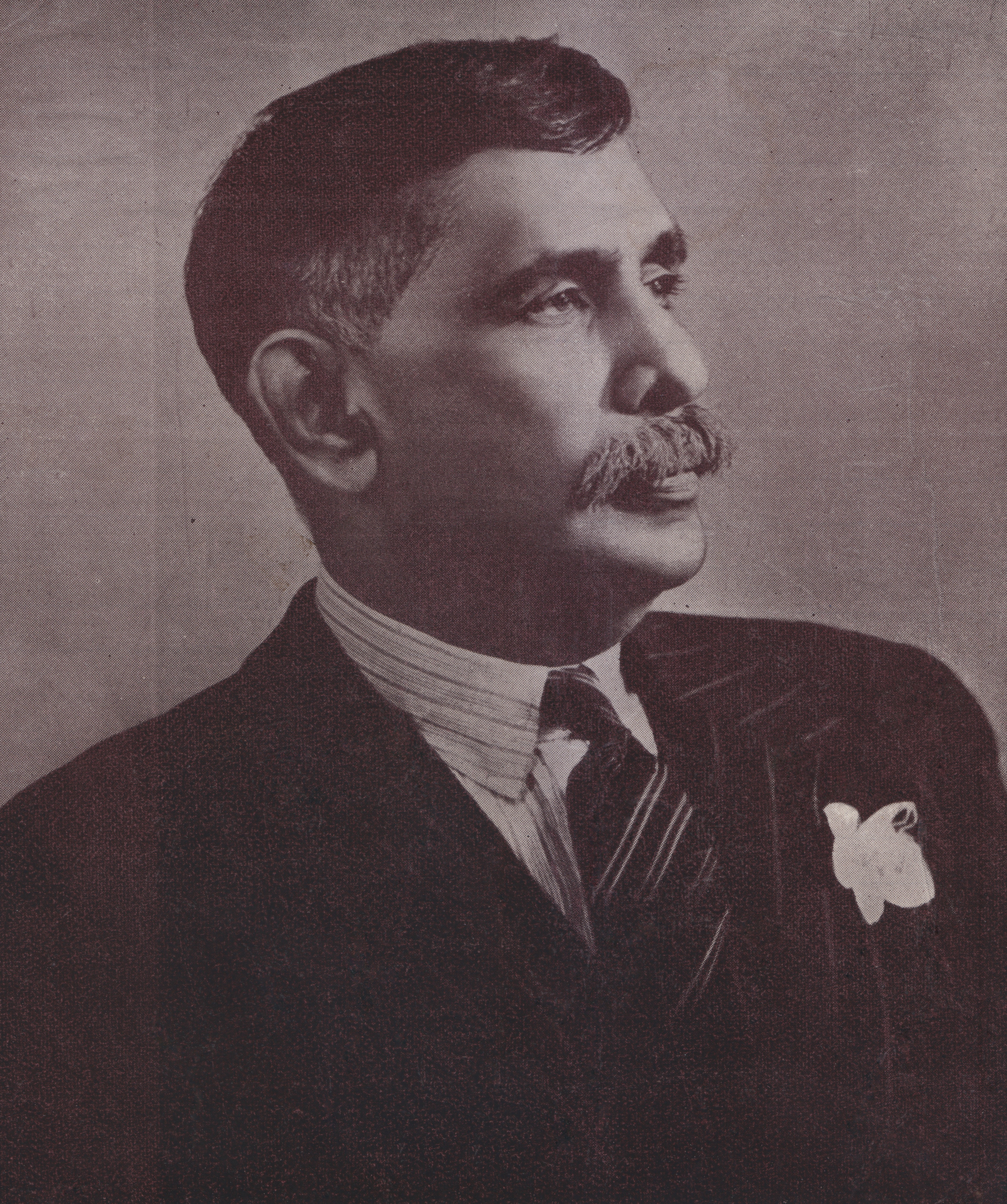
D. S. Senanayake became the first prime minister of Ceylon in 1947.

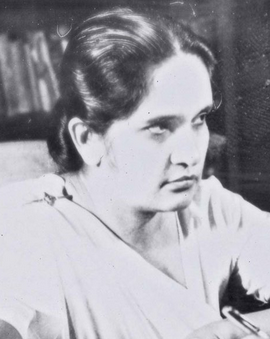
Sirimavo Bandaranaike was the first female prime minister of Ceylon and also its longest-serving prime minister, holding the office for over 17 years on three separate occasions.

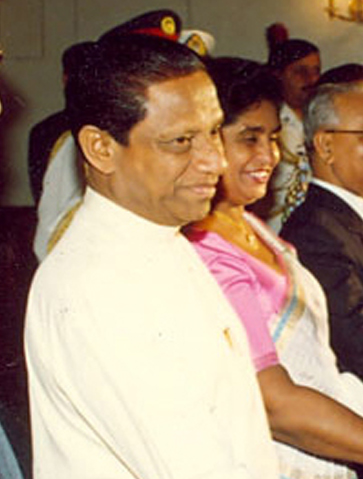
Ranasinghe Premadasa was the longest uninterrupted serving prime minister, holding office for over 10 years from 1978 to 1989.

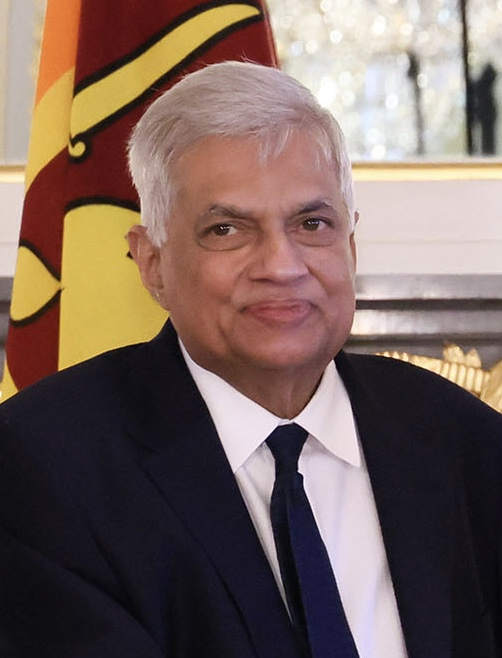
Ranil Wickremesinghe has served as prime minister four separate times and has been sworn in on six occasions, the most of any Sri Lankan prime minister.

== List of prime ministers ==
Parties

United National Party (7) Sri Lanka Freedom Party (6) Sinhala Bhasha Peramuna (1) Sri Lanka Podujana Peramuna (2) National People's Power (1)

No.	Portrait	Name (Birth–Death) Constituency	Term of office Electoral mandates Time in office		Other ministerial offices held while Prime Minister	Political party of PM (Alliance)	Government		Refs
1		D. S. Senanayake දොන් ස්ටීවන් සේනානායක டான் ஸ்டீபன் சேனாநாயக்க (1883–1952); Mirigama	24 September 1947	22 March 1952†	Minister of External Affairs and Defence	United National Party	D. S. Senanayake	1st	
1		D. S. Senanayake දොන් ස්ටීවන් සේනානායක டான் ஸ்டீபன் சேனாநாயக்க (1883–1952); Mirigama	1947		Minister of External Affairs and Defence	United National Party	D. S. Senanayake	1st	
1		D. S. Senanayake දොන් ස්ටීවන් සේනානායක டான் ஸ்டீபன் சேனாநாயக்க (1883–1952); Mirigama	4 years, 5 months and 27 days		Minister of External Affairs and Defence	United National Party	D. S. Senanayake	1st	
1		D. S. Senanayake දොන් ස්ටීවන් සේනානායක டான் ஸ்டீபன் சேனாநாயக்க (1883–1952); Mirigama	The first Prime Minister of Ceylon. The country gained independence from the United Kingdom during his term of office. Died in office.						
2		Dudley Senanayake ඩඩ්ලි ෂෙල්ටන් සෙනානායක டட்லி சேனநாயக்கா (1911–1973); Dedigama	26 March 1952	12 October 1953	Minister of External Affairs and Defence; Minister of Agriculture & Lands & Minister of Health & Local Government	United National Party	Dudley Senanayake I	1st 2nd	
2		Dudley Senanayake ඩඩ්ලි ෂෙල්ටන් සෙනානායක டட்லி சேனநாயக்கா (1911–1973); Dedigama	1952		Minister of External Affairs and Defence; Minister of Agriculture & Lands & Minister of Health & Local Government	United National Party	Dudley Senanayake I	1st 2nd	
2		Dudley Senanayake ඩඩ්ලි ෂෙල්ටන් සෙනානායක டட்லி சேனநாயக்கா (1911–1973); Dedigama	1 year, 6 months and 16 days		Minister of External Affairs and Defence; Minister of Agriculture & Lands & Minister of Health & Local Government	United National Party	Dudley Senanayake I	1st 2nd	
2		Dudley Senanayake ඩඩ්ලි ෂෙල්ටන් සෙනානායක டட்லி சேனநாயக்கா (1911–1973); Dedigama	Appointed as Prime Minister following the death of his father, D. S. Senanayake. His party won at the general elections held in 1952, and he continued to hold office without re-appointment. Resigned amidst the 1953 Ceylonese Hartal.						
3		Sir John Kotelawala ශ්‍රිමත් ජෝන් කොතලාවල சேர் ஜோன் கொத்தலாவலை CH, KBE, KStJ, CLI (1897–1980); Dodangaslanda	12 October 1953	12 April 1956	Minister of External Affairs and Defence & Minister of Transport & Works	United National Party	Kotelawala	2nd	
3		Sir John Kotelawala ශ්‍රිමත් ජෝන් කොතලාවල சேர் ஜோன் கொத்தலாவலை CH, KBE, KStJ, CLI (1897–1980); Dodangaslanda	—		Minister of External Affairs and Defence & Minister of Transport & Works	United National Party	Kotelawala	2nd	
3		Sir John Kotelawala ශ්‍රිමත් ජෝන් කොතලාවල சேர் ஜோன் கொத்தலாவலை CH, KBE, KStJ, CLI (1897–1980); Dodangaslanda	2 years and 6 months		Minister of External Affairs and Defence & Minister of Transport & Works	United National Party	Kotelawala	2nd	
3		Sir John Kotelawala ශ්‍රිමත් ජෝන් කොතලාවල சேர் ஜோன் கொத்தலாவலை CH, KBE, KStJ, CLI (1897–1980); Dodangaslanda	Sri Lanka joined the United Nations during Kotelawala's term of office.						
4		S. W. R. D. Bandaranaike සොලමන් වෙස්ට් රිජ්වේ ඩයස් බණ්ඩාරනායක சொலமன் வெஸ்ட் ரிட்ஜ்வே டயஸ் பண்டாரநாயக்கா (1899–1959); Attanagalla	12 April 1956	26 September 1959†	Minister of External Affairs and Defence	Sri Lanka Freedom Party (MEP)	S. W. R. D. Bandaranaike	3rd	
4		S. W. R. D. Bandaranaike සොලමන් වෙස්ට් රිජ්වේ ඩයස් බණ්ඩාරනායක சொலமன் வெஸ்ட் ரிட்ஜ்வே டயஸ் பண்டாரநாயக்கா (1899–1959); Attanagalla	1956		Minister of External Affairs and Defence	Sri Lanka Freedom Party (MEP)	S. W. R. D. Bandaranaike	3rd	
4		S. W. R. D. Bandaranaike සොලමන් වෙස්ට් රිජ්වේ ඩයස් බණ්ඩාරනායක சொலமன் வெஸ்ட் ரிட்ஜ்வே டயஸ் பண்டாரநாயக்கா (1899–1959); Attanagalla	3 years, 5 months and 14 days		Minister of External Affairs and Defence	Sri Lanka Freedom Party (MEP)	S. W. R. D. Bandaranaike	3rd	
4		S. W. R. D. Bandaranaike සොලමන් වෙස්ට් රිජ්වේ ඩයස් බණ්ඩාරනායක சொலமன் வெஸ்ட் ரிட்ஜ்வே டயஸ் பண்டாரநாயக்கா (1899–1959); Attanagalla	Bandaranaike changed the official language of the country from English to Sinhalese. He was assassinated during his term of office.						
5		Wijeyananda Dahanayake විජයානන්ද දහනායක விஜயானந்த தகநாயக்கா (1902–1997); Galle	26 September 1959	20 March 1960	Minister of External Affairs and Defence	Sinhala Bhasha Peramuna (MEP)	Dahanayake	3rd	
5		Wijeyananda Dahanayake විජයානන්ද දහනායක விஜயானந்த தகநாயக்கா (1902–1997); Galle	—		Minister of External Affairs and Defence	Sinhala Bhasha Peramuna (MEP)	Dahanayake	3rd	
5		Wijeyananda Dahanayake විජයානන්ද දහනායක விஜயானந்த தகநாயக்கா (1902–1997); Galle	5 months and 23 days		Minister of External Affairs and Defence	Sinhala Bhasha Peramuna (MEP)	Dahanayake	3rd	
5		Wijeyananda Dahanayake විජයානන්ද දහනායක விஜயானந்த தகநாயக்கா (1902–1997); Galle	Appointed following the assassination of Bandaranaike. Following disagreements with the members of his government and party, he was forced to dissolve the parliament.						
(2)		Dudley Senanayake ඩඩ්ලි සේනානායක டட்லி சேனநாயக்கா (1911–1973); Dedigama	21 March 1960	21 July 1960	Minister of External Affairs and Defence	United National Party	Dudley Senanayake II	4th	
(2)		Dudley Senanayake ඩඩ්ලි සේනානායක டட்லி சேனநாயக்கா (1911–1973); Dedigama	March 1960		Minister of External Affairs and Defence	United National Party	Dudley Senanayake II	4th	
(2)		Dudley Senanayake ඩඩ්ලි සේනානායක டட்லி சேனநாயக்கா (1911–1973); Dedigama	4 months		Minister of External Affairs and Defence	United National Party	Dudley Senanayake II	4th	
(2)		Dudley Senanayake ඩඩ්ලි සේනානායක டட்லி சேனநாயக்கா (1911–1973); Dedigama	Senanayake's government was defeated within a month. Senanayake continued to serve as prime minister until 21 July 1960.						
6		Sirimavo Bandaranaike සිරිමාවො රත්වත්තේ ඩයස් බණ්ඩාරනායක சிறிமா ரத்வத்தே டயஸ் பண்டாரநாயக்கே (1916–2000)	21 July 1960	25 March 1965	Minister of External Affairs and Defence	Sri Lanka Freedom Party	Sirimavo Bandaranaike I	5th	
6		Sirimavo Bandaranaike සිරිමාවො රත්වත්තේ ඩයස් බණ්ඩාරනායක சிறிமா ரத்வத்தே டயஸ் பண்டாரநாயக்கே (1916–2000)	July 1960		Minister of External Affairs and Defence	Sri Lanka Freedom Party	Sirimavo Bandaranaike I	5th	
6		Sirimavo Bandaranaike සිරිමාවො රත්වත්තේ ඩයස් බණ්ඩාරනායක சிறிமா ரத்வத்தே டயஸ் பண்டாரநாயக்கே (1916–2000)	4 years, 8 months and 4 days		Minister of External Affairs and Defence	Sri Lanka Freedom Party	Sirimavo Bandaranaike I	5th	
6		Sirimavo Bandaranaike සිරිමාවො රත්වත්තේ ඩයස් බණ්ඩාරනායක சிறிமா ரத்வத்தே டயஸ் பண்டாரநாயக்கே (1916–2000)	Sirimavo Bandaranaike was the world's first female prime minister. She was not a member of Parliament at the time of her appointment, and was appointed to the Senate on 2 August 1960.						
(2)		Dudley Senanayake ඩඩ්ලි සේනානායක டட்லி சேனநாயக்கா (1911–1973); Dedigama	25 March 1965	29 May 1970	Minister of External Affairs and Defence	United National Party	Dudley Senanayake III	6th	
(2)		Dudley Senanayake ඩඩ්ලි සේනානායක டட்லி சேனநாயக்கா (1911–1973); Dedigama	1965		Minister of External Affairs and Defence	United National Party	Dudley Senanayake III	6th	
(2)		Dudley Senanayake ඩඩ්ලි සේනානායක டட்லி சேனநாயக்கா (1911–1973); Dedigama	5 years, 2 months and 4 days		Minister of External Affairs and Defence	United National Party	Dudley Senanayake III	6th	
(2)		Dudley Senanayake ඩඩ්ලි සේනානායක டட்லி சேனநாயக்கா (1911–1973); Dedigama	Senanayake was elected prime minister for the third time, when his party formed a coalition government with the help of six other parties, after an election which did not give a clear majority to any party. The agriculture sector was given high priority during his term of office.						
(6)		Sirimavo Bandaranaike සිරිමාවො රත්වත්තේ ඩයස් බණ්ඩාරනායක சிறிமா ரத்வத்தே டயஸ் பண்டாரநாயக்கே (1916–2000); Attanagalla	29 May 1970	23 July 1977	Minister of External Affairs and Defence & Minister of Planning & Employment	Sri Lanka Freedom Party	Sirimavo Bandaranaike II	7th	
(6)		Sirimavo Bandaranaike සිරිමාවො රත්වත්තේ ඩයස් බණ්ඩාරනායක சிறிமா ரத்வத்தே டயஸ் பண்டாரநாயக்கே (1916–2000); Attanagalla	1970		Minister of External Affairs and Defence & Minister of Planning & Employment	Sri Lanka Freedom Party	Sirimavo Bandaranaike II	7th	
(6)		Sirimavo Bandaranaike සිරිමාවො රත්වත්තේ ඩයස් බණ්ඩාරනායක சிறிமா ரத்வத்தே டயஸ் பண்டாரநாயக்கே (1916–2000); Attanagalla	7 years, 1 month and 24 days		Minister of External Affairs and Defence & Minister of Planning & Employment	Sri Lanka Freedom Party	Sirimavo Bandaranaike II	7th	
(6)		Sirimavo Bandaranaike සිරිමාවො රත්වත්තේ ඩයස් බණ්ඩාරනායක சிறிமா ரத்வத்தே டயஸ் பண்டாரநாயக்கே (1916–2000); Attanagalla	Sirimavo Bandaranaike declared the country a republic, and changed the name of the country from Ceylon to Sri Lanka. Nationalized many companies in the plantation sector and imposed restrictions on several imports. This led to the downfall of the country's economy and her defeat in the 1977 general elections.						
7		J. R. Jayewardene ජුනියස් රිචඩ් ජයවර්ධන ஜூனியஸ் ரிச்சட் ஜயவர்தனா (1906–1996); Colombo West	23 July 1977	4 February 1978	Minister of Defence; Minister of Planning & Economic Affairs & Minister of Plan Implementation	United National Party	Jayewardene	8th	
7		J. R. Jayewardene ජුනියස් රිචඩ් ජයවර්ධන ஜூனியஸ் ரிச்சட் ஜயவர்தனா (1906–1996); Colombo West	1977		Minister of Defence; Minister of Planning & Economic Affairs & Minister of Plan Implementation	United National Party	Jayewardene	8th	
7		J. R. Jayewardene ජුනියස් රිචඩ් ජයවර්ධන ஜூனியஸ் ரிச்சட் ஜயவர்தனா (1906–1996); Colombo West	6 months and 12 days		Minister of Defence; Minister of Planning & Economic Affairs & Minister of Plan Implementation	United National Party	Jayewardene	8th	
7		J. R. Jayewardene ජුනියස් රිචඩ් ජයවර්ධන ஜூனியஸ் ரிச்சட் ஜயவர்தனா (1906–1996); Colombo West	Introduced the executive presidency in 1978 and became president.						
8		Ranasinghe Premadasa රණසිංහ ප්‍රේමදාස ரணசிங்க பிரேமதாசா (1924–1993); Colombo Central	6 February 1978	2 January 1989	Minister of Local Government, Housing & Construction	United National Party	Jayewardene	8th	
8		Ranasinghe Premadasa රණසිංහ ප්‍රේමදාස ரணசிங்க பிரேமதாசா (1924–1993); Colombo Central	—		Minister of Local Government, Housing & Construction	United National Party	Jayewardene	8th	
8		Ranasinghe Premadasa රණසිංහ ප්‍රේමදාස ரணசிங்க பிரேமதாசா (1924–1993); Colombo Central	10 years, 10 months and 27 days		Minister of Local Government, Housing & Construction	United National Party	Jayewardene	8th	
8		Ranasinghe Premadasa රණසිංහ ප්‍රේමදාස ரணசிங்க பிரேமதாசா (1924–1993); Colombo Central	The first prime minister to be appointed after the constitutional changes of 1978, with the powers of the position reduced significantly.						
9		D. B. Wijetunga ඩිංගිරි බණ්ඩා විජේතුංග டிங்கிரி பண்ட விஜேதுங்க (1916–2008); Yatinuwara	6 March 1989	7 May 1993	Minister of Finance & Minister of Labour & Vocational Training	United National Party	Premadasa	9th	
9		D. B. Wijetunga ඩිංගිරි බණ්ඩා විජේතුංග டிங்கிரி பண்ட விஜேதுங்க (1916–2008); Yatinuwara	1989		Minister of Finance & Minister of Labour & Vocational Training	United National Party	Premadasa	9th	
9		D. B. Wijetunga ඩිංගිරි බණ්ඩා විජේතුංග டிங்கிரி பண்ட விஜேதுங்க (1916–2008); Yatinuwara	4 years, 2 months and 1 day		Minister of Finance & Minister of Labour & Vocational Training	United National Party	Premadasa	9th	
9		D. B. Wijetunga ඩිංගිරි බණ්ඩා විජේතුංග டிங்கிரி பண்ட விஜேதுங்க (1916–2008); Yatinuwara	Appointed in a surprise move by President Ranasinghe Premadasa. Wijetunga himself reacted in surprise at the appointment. He resigned from the post on 28 March 1990 but was reappointed two days later on 30 March 1990. Ascended to the presidency following Premadasa's assassination.						
10		Ranil Wickremesinghe රනිල් වික්‍රමසිංහ ரணில் விக்ரமசிங்க (born 1949); Biyagama	7 May 1993	19 August 1994		United National Party	Wijetunga I	9th	
10		Ranil Wickremesinghe රනිල් වික්‍රමසිංහ ரணில் விக்ரமசிங்க (born 1949); Biyagama	—			United National Party	Wijetunga I	9th	
10		Ranil Wickremesinghe රනිල් වික්‍රමසිංහ ரணில் விக்ரமசிங்க (born 1949); Biyagama	1 year, 3 months and 12 days			United National Party	Wijetunga I	9th	
10		Ranil Wickremesinghe රනිල් වික්‍රමසිංහ ரணில் விக்ரமசிங்க (born 1949); Biyagama	Appointed as prime minister following the assassination of former president Ranasinghe Premadasa and Wijetunga's ascension to the presidency.						
11		Chandrika Kumaratunga චන්ද්‍රිකා බණ්ඩාරනායක කුමාරතුංග சந்திரிகா பண்டாரநாயக்கே குமாரதுங்கா (born 1945); Attanagalla	19 August 1994	12 November 1994		Sri Lanka Freedom Party (PA)	Wijetunga II	10th	
11		Chandrika Kumaratunga චන්ද්‍රිකා බණ්ඩාරනායක කුමාරතුංග சந்திரிகா பண்டாரநாயக்கே குமாரதுங்கா (born 1945); Attanagalla	1994			Sri Lanka Freedom Party (PA)	Wijetunga II	10th	
11		Chandrika Kumaratunga චන්ද්‍රිකා බණ්ඩාරනායක කුමාරතුංග சந்திரிகா பண்டாரநாயக்கே குமாரதுங்கா (born 1945); Attanagalla	2 months and 24 days			Sri Lanka Freedom Party (PA)	Wijetunga II	10th	
11		Chandrika Kumaratunga චන්ද්‍රිකා බණ්ඩාරනායක කුමාරතුංග சந்திரிகா பண்டாரநாயக்கே குமாரதுங்கா (born 1945); Attanagalla	Served as the prime minister for a short period, before contesting in the 1994 presidential elections and being elected as president.						
(6)		Sirimavo Bandaranaike සිරිමාවො රත්වත්තේ ඩයස් බණ්ඩාරනායක சிறிமா ரத்வத்தே டயஸ் பண்டாரநாயக்கே (1916–2000); National List	14 November 1994	9 August 2000		Sri Lanka Freedom Party (PA)	Kumaratunga I	10th	
(6)		Sirimavo Bandaranaike සිරිමාවො රත්වත්තේ ඩයස් බණ්ඩාරනායක சிறிமா ரத்வத்தே டயஸ் பண்டாரநாயக்கே (1916–2000); National List	—			Sri Lanka Freedom Party (PA)	Kumaratunga I	10th	
(6)		Sirimavo Bandaranaike සිරිමාවො රත්වත්තේ ඩයස් බණ්ඩාරනායක சிறிமா ரத்வத்தே டயஸ் பண்டாரநாயக்கே (1916–2000); National List	5 years, 8 months and 26 days			Sri Lanka Freedom Party (PA)	Kumaratunga I	10th	
(6)		Sirimavo Bandaranaike සිරිමාවො රත්වත්තේ ඩයස් බණ්ඩාරනායක சிறிமா ரத்வத்தே டயஸ் பண்டாரநாயக்கே (1916–2000); National List	Sirimavo Bandaranaike was appointed as the prime minister for a third and final term when her daughter Chandrika Kumaratunga was appointed as the president of Sri Lanka. Resigned in 2000.						
12		Ratnasiri Wickremanayake රත්නසිරි වික්‍රමනායක ரத்னசிறி விக்கிரமநாயக்க (1933–2016); Horana	10 August 2000	7 December 2001		Sri Lanka Freedom Party (PA)	Kumaratunga II	10th 11th	
12		Ratnasiri Wickremanayake රත්නසිරි වික්‍රමනායක ரத்னசிறி விக்கிரமநாயக்க (1933–2016); Horana	2000			Sri Lanka Freedom Party (PA)	Kumaratunga II	10th 11th	
12		Ratnasiri Wickremanayake රත්නසිරි වික්‍රමනායක ரத்னசிறி விக்கிரமநாயக்க (1933–2016); Horana	1 year, 3 months and 27 days			Sri Lanka Freedom Party (PA)	Kumaratunga II	10th 11th	
12		Ratnasiri Wickremanayake රත්නසිරි වික්‍රමනායක ரத்னசிறி விக்கிரமநாயக்க (1933–2016); Horana	Wickremanayake assumed the office of prime minister following the resignation of Sirimavo Bandaranaike.						
(10)		Ranil Wickremesinghe රනිල් වික්‍රමසිංහ ரணில் விக்ரமசிங்க (born 1949); Colombo	9 December 2001	6 April 2004		United National Party (UNF)	Kumaratunga III	12th	
(10)		Ranil Wickremesinghe රනිල් වික්‍රමසිංහ ரணில் விக்ரமசிங்க (born 1949); Colombo	2001			United National Party (UNF)	Kumaratunga III	12th	
(10)		Ranil Wickremesinghe රනිල් වික්‍රමසිංහ ரணில் விக்ரமசிங்க (born 1949); Colombo	2 years, 3 months and 28 days			United National Party (UNF)	Kumaratunga III	12th	
(10)		Ranil Wickremesinghe රනිල් වික්‍රමසිංහ ரணில் விக்ரமசிங்க (born 1949); Colombo	Wickremesinghe's term of office ended early when President Chandrika Kumaratunga dismissed his government and called for a general election in 2004.						
13		Mahinda Rajapaksa මහින්ද රාජපක්ෂ மஹிந்த ராஜபக்ஷ (born 1945); Hambantota	6 April 2004	19 November 2005	Ministry of Highways	Sri Lanka Freedom Party (UPFA)	Kumaratunga IV	13th	
13		Mahinda Rajapaksa මහින්ද රාජපක්ෂ மஹிந்த ராஜபக்ஷ (born 1945); Hambantota	2004		Ministry of Highways	Sri Lanka Freedom Party (UPFA)	Kumaratunga IV	13th	
13		Mahinda Rajapaksa මහින්ද රාජපක්ෂ மஹிந்த ராஜபக்ஷ (born 1945); Hambantota	1 year, 7 months and 13 days		Ministry of Highways	Sri Lanka Freedom Party (UPFA)	Kumaratunga IV	13th	
13		Mahinda Rajapaksa මහින්ද රාජපක්ෂ மஹிந்த ராஜபக்ஷ (born 1945); Hambantota	Appointed as prime minister of the cabinet that was formed after the elections following the dismissal of Wickremesinghe's government by President Chandrika Kumaratunga. He won the presidential elections in 2005 and was appointed President of Sri Lanka.						
(12)		Ratnasiri Wickremanayake රත්නසිරි වික්‍රමනායක ரத்னசிறி விக்கிரமநாயக்க (1933–2016); National List	19 November 2005	21 April 2010		Sri Lanka Freedom Party (UPFA)	Mahinda Rajapaksa	13th	
(12)		Ratnasiri Wickremanayake රත්නසිරි වික්‍රමනායක ரத்னசிறி விக்கிரமநாயக்க (1933–2016); National List	—			Sri Lanka Freedom Party (UPFA)	Mahinda Rajapaksa	13th	
(12)		Ratnasiri Wickremanayake රත්නසිරි වික්‍රමනායක ரத்னசிறி விக்கிரமநாயக்க (1933–2016); National List	4 years, 5 months and 2 days			Sri Lanka Freedom Party (UPFA)	Mahinda Rajapaksa	13th	
(12)		Ratnasiri Wickremanayake රත්නසිරි වික්‍රමනායක ரத்னசிறி விக்கிரமநாயக்க (1933–2016); National List	Appointed as prime minister when Rajapaksa assumed the presidency.						
14		D. M. Jayaratne දිසානායක මුදියන්සේලාගේ ජයරත්න திசாநாயக்க முதியன்சேலாகே ஜயரத்ன (1931–2019); National List	21 April 2010	9 January 2015	Minister of Buddhasasana & Religious Affairs	Sri Lanka Freedom Party (UPFA)	Mahinda Rajapaksa	14th	
14		D. M. Jayaratne දිසානායක මුදියන්සේලාගේ ජයරත්න திசாநாயக்க முதியன்சேலாகே ஜயரத்ன (1931–2019); National List	2010		Minister of Buddhasasana & Religious Affairs	Sri Lanka Freedom Party (UPFA)	Mahinda Rajapaksa	14th	
14		D. M. Jayaratne දිසානායක මුදියන්සේලාගේ ජයරත්න திசாநாயக்க முதியன்சேலாகே ஜயரத்ன (1931–2019); National List	4 years, 8 months and 19 days		Minister of Buddhasasana & Religious Affairs	Sri Lanka Freedom Party (UPFA)	Mahinda Rajapaksa	14th	
14		D. M. Jayaratne දිසානායක මුදියන්සේලාගේ ජයරත්න திசாநாயக்க முதியன்சேலாகே ஜயரத்ன (1931–2019); National List	Appointed as prime minister after the incumbent Sri Lanka Freedom Party won the parliamentary elections held in April 2010.						
(10)		Ranil Wickremesinghe රනිල් වික්‍රමසිංහ ரணில் விக்ரமசிங்க (born 1949); Colombo	9 January 2015	26 October 2018	Minister of National Policies and Economic Affairs	United National Party (UNFGG)	Sirisena I	14th	
(10)		Ranil Wickremesinghe රනිල් වික්‍රමසිංහ ரணில் விக்ரமசிங்க (born 1949); Colombo	2015		Minister of National Policies and Economic Affairs	United National Party (UNFGG)	Sirisena II	15th	
(10)		Ranil Wickremesinghe රනිල් වික්‍රමසිංහ ரணில் விக்ரமசிங்க (born 1949); Colombo	3 years, 9 months and 17 days		Minister of National Policies and Economic Affairs	United National Party (UNFGG)	Sirisena II	15th	
(10)		Ranil Wickremesinghe රනිල් වික්‍රමසිංහ ரணில் விக்ரமசிங்க (born 1949); Colombo	Appointed as prime minister by President Maithripala Sirisena after his victory in the 2015 presidential elections and was re-elected in the 2015 parliamentary elections.						
(13)		Mahinda Rajapaksa මහින්ද රාජපක්ෂ மஹிந்த ராஜபக்ஷ (born 1945); Kurunegala (de facto)	26 October 2018	15 December 2018	Minister of Finance and Economic Affairs	Sri Lanka Podujana Peramuna	Sirisena III	15th	
(13)		Mahinda Rajapaksa මහින්ද රාජපක්ෂ மஹிந்த ராஜபக்ஷ (born 1945); Kurunegala (de facto)	—		Minister of Finance and Economic Affairs	Sri Lanka Podujana Peramuna	Sirisena III	15th	
(13)		Mahinda Rajapaksa මහින්ද රාජපක්ෂ மஹிந்த ராஜபக்ஷ (born 1945); Kurunegala (de facto)	1 month and 19 days		Minister of Finance and Economic Affairs	Sri Lanka Podujana Peramuna	Sirisena III	15th	
(13)		Mahinda Rajapaksa මහින්ද රාජපක්ෂ மஹிந்த ராஜபக்ஷ (born 1945); Kurunegala (de facto)	2018 Sri Lankan constitutional crisis: Appointed by Sirisena after the incumbent Wickremesinghe was suddenly dismissed by Sirisena. Rajapaksa's term was disputed by Wickremesinghe and Sri Lanka had two concurrent prime ministerial claimants. After failing to conduct a majority support vote in the house, Rajapaksa's duties were suspended by the Supreme Court of Sri Lanka. Subsequently resigned from office to pave way for Wickremesinghe.						
(10)		Ranil Wickremesinghe රනිල් වික්‍රමසිංහ ரணில் விக்ரமசிங்க (born 1949); Colombo	16 December 2018	21 November 2019	Minister of National Policies and Economic Affairs	United National Party (UNFGG)	Sirisena IV	15th	
(10)		Ranil Wickremesinghe රනිල් වික්‍රමසිංහ ரணில் விக்ரமசிங்க (born 1949); Colombo	—		Minister of National Policies and Economic Affairs	United National Party (UNFGG)	Sirisena IV	15th	
(10)		Ranil Wickremesinghe රනිල් වික්‍රමසිංහ ரணில் விக்ரமசிங்க (born 1949); Colombo	11 months and 5 days		Minister of National Policies and Economic Affairs	United National Party (UNFGG)	Sirisena IV	15th	
(10)		Ranil Wickremesinghe රනිල් වික්‍රමසිංහ ரணில் விக்ரமசிங்க (born 1949); Colombo	Restored as prime minister after the 2018 Sri Lankan constitutional crisis. Resigned in 2019.						
(13)		Mahinda Rajapaksa මහින්ද රාජපක්ෂ மஹிந்த ராஜபக்ஷ (born 1945); Kurunegala	21 November 2019	9 May 2022	Minister of Finance; Minister of Urban Development & Housing; Minister of Buddhasasana, Religious & Cultural Affairs	Sri Lanka Podujana Peramuna (SLFPA)	Gotabaya Rajapaksa I	15th	
(13)		Mahinda Rajapaksa මහින්ද රාජපක්ෂ மஹிந்த ராஜபக்ஷ (born 1945); Kurunegala	2020		Minister of Finance; Minister of Urban Development & Housing; Minister of Buddhasasana, Religious & Cultural Affairs	Sri Lanka Podujana Peramuna (SLFPA)	Gotabaya Rajapaksa II	16th	
(13)		Mahinda Rajapaksa මහින්ද රාජපක්ෂ மஹிந்த ராஜபக்ஷ (born 1945); Kurunegala	2 years, 5 months and 18 days		Minister of Finance; Minister of Urban Development & Housing; Minister of Buddhasasana, Religious & Cultural Affairs	Sri Lanka Podujana Peramuna (SLFPA)	Gotabaya Rajapaksa III	16th	
(13)		Mahinda Rajapaksa මහින්ද රාජපක්ෂ மஹிந்த ராஜபக்ஷ (born 1945); Kurunegala	Appointed by President Gotabaya Rajapaksa, following the resignation of Ranil Wickremesinghe after the 2019 presidential election and was re-elected in the 2020 parliamentary elections. Much of his tenure was plagued with major economic and political crises. Resigned amidst the 2022 Sri Lankan protests.						
(10)		Ranil Wickremesinghe රනිල් වික්‍රමසිංහ ரணில் விக்ரமசிங்க (born 1949); National List	12 May 2022	21 July 2022	Minister of Finance	United National Party	Gotabaya Rajapaksa IV	16th	
(10)		Ranil Wickremesinghe රනිල් වික්‍රමසිංහ ரணில் விக்ரமசிங்க (born 1949); National List	—		Minister of Finance	United National Party	Gotabaya Rajapaksa IV	16th	
(10)		Ranil Wickremesinghe රනිල් වික්‍රමසිංහ ரணில் விக்ரமசிங்க (born 1949); National List	2 months and 9 days		Minister of Finance	United National Party	Gotabaya Rajapaksa IV	16th	
(10)		Ranil Wickremesinghe රනිල් වික්‍රමසිංහ ரணில் விக்ரமசிங்க (born 1949); National List	Appointed by President Gotabaya Rajapaksa, following the resignation of Mahinda Rajapaksa amidst the 2022 Sri Lankan political crisis. On 13 July 2022, he became the acting president of the republic as Gotabaya Rajapaksa fled the country and resigned amidst the protests and was outright elected as president a week later.						
15		Dinesh Gunawardena දිනේෂ් ගුණවර්ධන தினேஷ் குணவர்தன (born 1949); Colombo	22 July 2022	23 September 2024	Minister of Public Administration, Home Affairs, Provincial Councils and Local Government	Sri Lanka Podujana Peramuna	Wickremesinghe	16th	
15		Dinesh Gunawardena දිනේෂ් ගුණවර්ධන தினேஷ் குணவர்தன (born 1949); Colombo	—		Minister of Public Administration, Home Affairs, Provincial Councils and Local Government	Sri Lanka Podujana Peramuna	Wickremesinghe	16th	
15		Dinesh Gunawardena දිනේෂ් ගුණවර්ධන தினேஷ் குணவர்தன (born 1949); Colombo	2 years, 2 months and 1 day		Minister of Public Administration, Home Affairs, Provincial Councils and Local Government	Sri Lanka Podujana Peramuna	Wickremesinghe	16th	
15		Dinesh Gunawardena දිනේෂ් ගුණවර්ධන தினேஷ் குணவர்தன (born 1949); Colombo	Appointed by President Ranil Wickremesinghe following his ascension to the presidency. Temporarily succeeded Mahinda Rajapaksa as the de facto leader of the ruling SLPP during the 2022 Sri Lankan political crisis.						
16		Harini Amarasuriya හරිනි අමරසූරිය ஹரிணி அமரசூரிய (born 1970); Colombo	24 September 2024	Incumbent	Minister of Education, Higher Education and Vocational Education	National People's Power	Dissanayake I	16th	
16		Harini Amarasuriya හරිනි අමරසූරිය ஹரிணி அமரசூரிய (born 1970); Colombo	2024		Minister of Education, Higher Education and Vocational Education	National People's Power	Dissanayake II	17th	
16		Harini Amarasuriya හරිනි අමරසූරිය ஹரிணி அமரசூரிய (born 1970); Colombo	2 years, 1 month and 28 days		Minister of Education, Higher Education and Vocational Education	National People's Power	Dissanayake II	17th	
16		Harini Amarasuriya හරිනි අමරසූරිය ஹரிணி அமரசூரிய (born 1970); Colombo	Appointed by President Anura Kumara Dissanayake following the resignation of Dinesh Gunawardena after the 2024 presidential election and was re-elected in the 2024 parliamentary elections.						

== List of prime ministers by length of term ==
No.	Name	Party	No. of terms	Length of term	
No.	Name	Party	No. of terms	Longest continuous term	Total years of premiership
1	Sirimavo Bandaranaike	SLPF	3	7 years, 55 days	17 years and 204 days
2	Ranasinghe Premadasa	UNP	1	10 years, 331 days	10 years, 331 days
3	Ranil Wickremesinghe	UNP	5	3 years, 290 days	8 years and 191 days
4	Dudley Senanayake	UNP	3	5 years, 65 days	7 years, 20 days
5	Ratnasiri Wickremanayake	SLPF	2	4 years, 153 days	5 years, 270 days
6	D. M. Jayaratne	SLPF	1	4 years, 263 days	4 years, 263 days
7	D. S. Senanayake	UNP	1	4 years, 180 days	4 years, 180 days
8	Mahinda Rajapaksa	SLPF, SLPP	3	2 years, 169 days	4 years and 80 days
9	Dingiri Banda Wijetunga	UNP	1	4 years, 62 days	4 years, 62 days
10	S. W. R. D. Bandaranaike	SLPF	1	3 years, 167 days	3 years, 167 days
11	Dinesh Gunawardena	SLPP	1	2 years, 63 days	2 years, 63 days
12	Harini Amarasuriya	NPP	1	2 years, 58 days*	2 years, 58 days*
13	John Kotelawala	UNP	1	1 year, 200 days	1 year, 200 days
14	J. R. Jayewardene	UNP	1	196 days	196 days
15	Wijeyananda Dahanayake	SBP	1	176 days	176 days
16	Chandrika Kumaratunga	SLPF	1	85 days	85 days

== Relations between prime ministers ==
Out of the 16 distinct people to have held the office of prime minister, 8 have come from three political families.

Relations	Prime ministers	Political family
Husband and wife	S. W. R. D. Bandaranaike and Sirimavo Bandaranaike	Bandaranaike
Father and son	D. S. Senanayake and Dudley Senanayake	Senanayake
Father and daughter	S. W. R. D. Bandaranaike and Chandrika Kumaratunga	Bandaranaike
Mother and daughter	Sirimavo Bandaranaike and Chandrika Kumaratunga	Bandaranaike
Uncle and nephew	D. S. Senanayake and John Kotelawala	Senanayake
Cousins	Dudley Senanayake and John Kotelawala	Senanayake
First cousins once removed	J. R. Jayewardene and Ranil Wickremesinghe	Wijewardene

== Living prime ministers ==
Living as of November 2024
Prime Minister	Date of birth	Premiership
Chandrika Kumaratunga	29 June 1945 (age 81)	1994
Mahinda Rajapaksa	18 November 1945 (age 81)	2004–2005, 2018, 2019–2022,
Dinesh Gunawardena	2 March 1949 (age 77)	2022–2024
Ranil Wickremesinghe	24 March 1949 (age 77)	1993–1994, 2001–2004, 2015–2018, 2018–2019, 2022
Harini Amarasuriya	6 March 1970 (age 56)	2024–present

== See also ==
- List of presidents of Sri Lanka
- Prime Minister's Office (Sri Lanka)
- Leader of the Opposition (Sri Lanka)

== Notes ==
1. The Parliament was known as the "House of Representatives" during the period of 1947–1972
2. In 1972, the country was named "Free, Sovereign and Independent Republic of Sri Lanka", and the Parliament was named as the National State Assembly.
3. Under the constitutional changes of 1978, the country was renamed as the "Democratic Socialist Republic of Sri Lanka", and the Parliament was referred to as "Parliament of the Democratic Socialist Republic of Sri Lanka".
