= List of presidents of Sri Lanka =

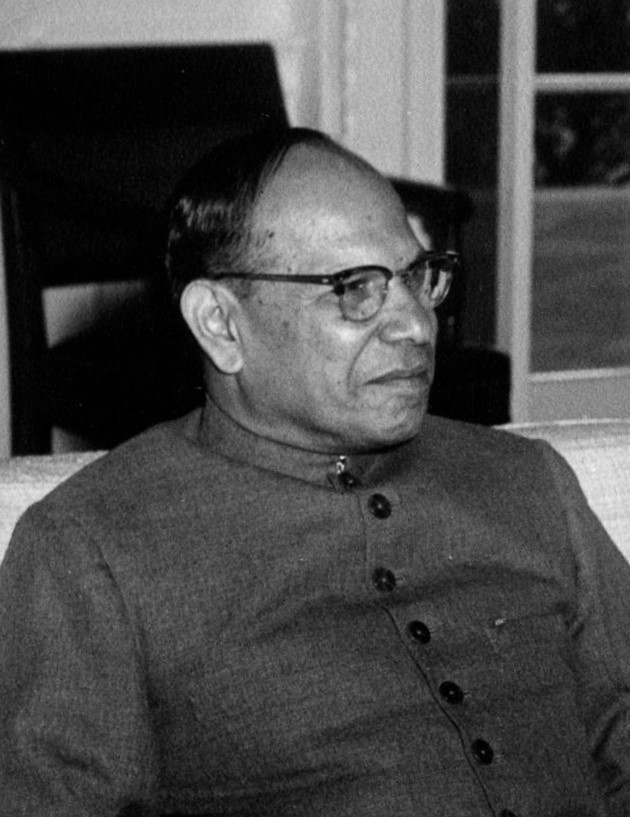
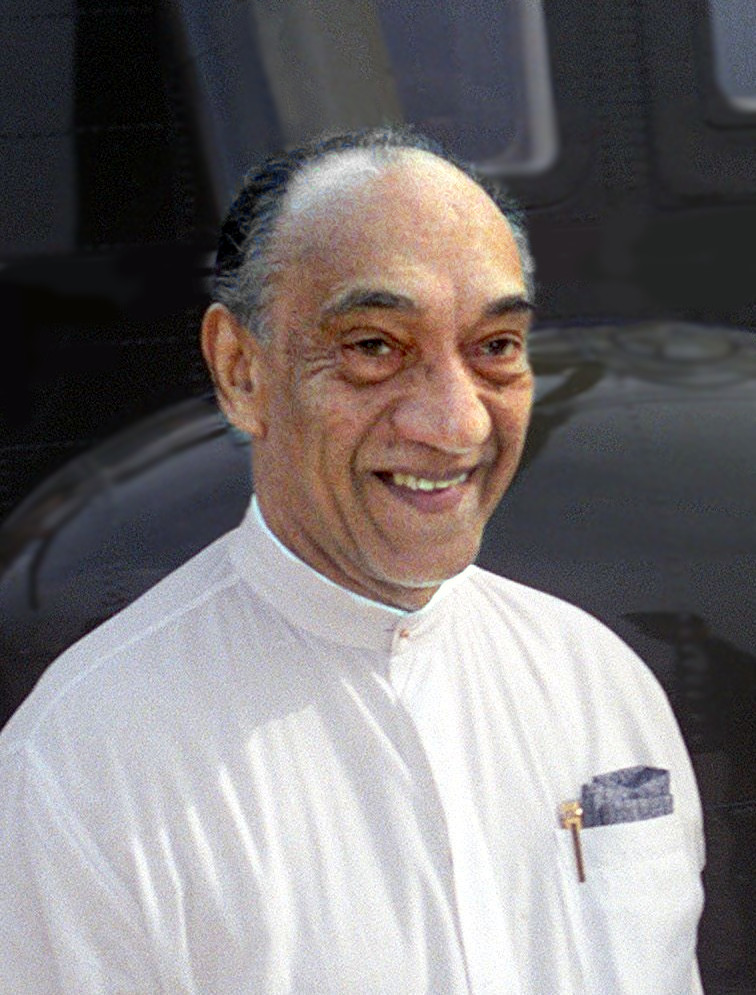
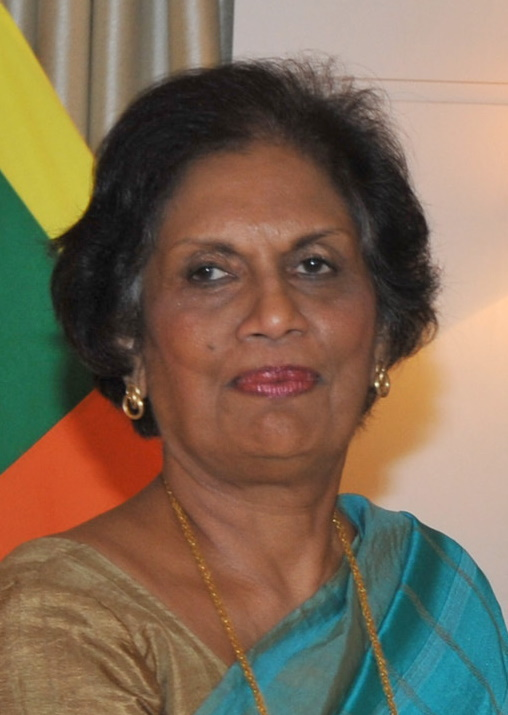
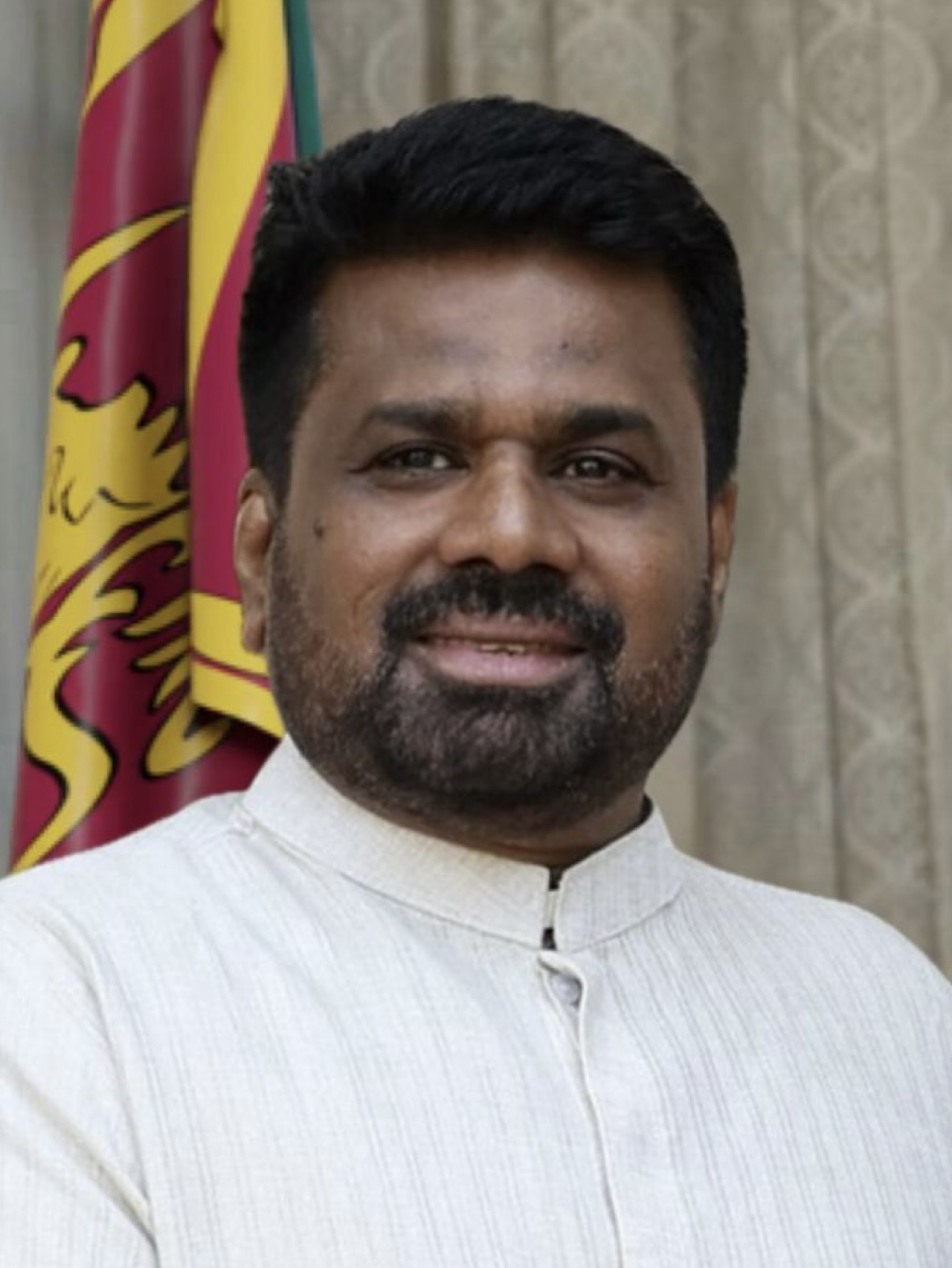
- Top left: William Gopallawa was the first and only non-executive president of Sri Lanka.
- Top right: J. R. Jayewardene was the first executive president of Sri Lanka.
- Bottom left: Chandrika Kumaratunga was the first female president and also the longest serving president of Sri Lanka.
- Bottom right: Anura Kumara Dissanayake is the current president of Sri Lanka.

The president of Sri Lanka is the elected head of state and the chief executive of Sri Lanka. The president is a dominant political figure in the country. The office was created in 1972, as more of a ceremonial position. It was empowered with executive powers by the 1978 Constitution introduced by J. R. Jayewardene.

== Presidents ==
Parties

Independent (1) United National Party (4) Sri Lanka Freedom Party (3) Sri Lanka Podujana Peramuna (1) National People's Power (1)

No.	Portrait	Name (Birth–Death) Home province	Term of office Electoral mandates Time in office		Other ministerial offices held while president	Party (Alliance)	Government		Ref.
Non-Executive President of Sri Lanka (1972–1978)
1		William Gopallawa විලියම් ගොපල්ලව வில்லியம் கோபள்ளவா (1896–1981); Central	22 May 1972	4 February 1978		Independent	Sirimavo Bandaranaike II	10th	
1		William Gopallawa විලියම් ගොපල්ලව வில்லியம் கோபள்ளவா (1896–1981); Central	—			Independent	Sirimavo Bandaranaike II	10th	
1		William Gopallawa විලියම් ගොපල්ලව வில்லியம் கோபள்ளவா (1896–1981); Central	5 years, 8 months and 13 days			Independent	Sirimavo Bandaranaike II	10th	
1		William Gopallawa විලියම් ගොපල්ලව வில்லியம் கோபள்ளவா (1896–1981); Central	Served as the last Governor-General of Ceylon and the first non-executive president when Ceylon declared itself a republic in 1972 and changed its name to Sri Lanka.						
Executive President of Sri Lanka (1978–present)
2		J. R. Jayewardene ජුනියස් රිචඩ් ජයවර්ධන ஜூனியஸ் ரிச்சட் ஜயவர்தனா (1906–1996); Western	4 February 1978	2 January 1989	Minister of Defence; Minister of Planning & Economic Affairs; Minister of Plan Implementation; Minister of Higher Education	United National Party	Jayewardene	11th 12th	
2		J. R. Jayewardene ජුනියස් රිචඩ් ජයවර්ධන ஜூனியஸ் ரிச்சட் ஜயவர்தனா (1906–1996); Western	1982		Minister of Defence; Minister of Planning & Economic Affairs; Minister of Plan Implementation; Minister of Higher Education	United National Party	Jayewardene	11th 12th	
2		J. R. Jayewardene ජුනියස් රිචඩ් ජයවර්ධන ஜூனியஸ் ரிச்சட் ஜயவர்தனா (1906–1996); Western	10 years, 11 months and 29 days		Minister of Defence; Minister of Planning & Economic Affairs; Minister of Plan Implementation; Minister of Higher Education	United National Party	Jayewardene	11th 12th	
2		J. R. Jayewardene ජුනියස් රිචඩ් ජයවර්ධන ஜூனியஸ் ரிச்சட் ஜயவர்தனா (1906–1996); Western	Introduced the executive presidency in 1978, and assumed the position of president of Sri Lanka.						
3		Sri Lankabhimanya; Ranasinghe Premadasa රණසිංහ ප්‍රේමදාස ரணசிங்க பிரேமதாசா (1924–1993); Western	2 January 1989	1 May 1993†	Minister of Defence; Minister of Buddha Sasana; Minister of Policy Planning & Implementation	United National Party	Premadasa	13th	
3		Sri Lankabhimanya; Ranasinghe Premadasa රණසිංහ ප්‍රේමදාස ரணசிங்க பிரேமதாசா (1924–1993); Western	1988		Minister of Defence; Minister of Buddha Sasana; Minister of Policy Planning & Implementation	United National Party	Premadasa	13th	
3		Sri Lankabhimanya; Ranasinghe Premadasa රණසිංහ ප්‍රේමදාස ரணசிங்க பிரேமதாசா (1924–1993); Western	4 years and 4 months		Minister of Defence; Minister of Buddha Sasana; Minister of Policy Planning & Implementation	United National Party	Premadasa	13th	
3		Sri Lankabhimanya; Ranasinghe Premadasa රණසිංහ ප්‍රේමදාස ரணசிங்க பிரேமதாசா (1924–1993); Western	Assassinated during a May Day rally by an LTTE suicide bomber.						
4		Sri Lankabhimanya; D. B. Wijetunga ඩිංගිරි බණ්ඩා විජේතුංග டிங்கிரி பண்ட விஜேதுங்க (1916–2008); Central	1 May 1993	7 May 1993	Minister of Defence; Minister of Finance; Minister of Buddhist Affairs	United National Party	Wijetunga I	13th	
4		Sri Lankabhimanya; D. B. Wijetunga ඩිංගිරි බණ්ඩා විජේතුංග டிங்கிரி பண்ட விஜேதுங்க (1916–2008); Central	7 May 1993	12 November 1994	Minister of Defence; Minister of Finance; Minister of Buddhist Affairs	United National Party	Wijetunga I	13th	
4		Sri Lankabhimanya; D. B. Wijetunga ඩිංගිරි බණ්ඩා විජේතුංග டிங்கிரி பண்ட விஜேதுங்க (1916–2008); Central	1993 (Note: Indirect election by parliarment.)		Minister of Defence; Minister of Finance; Minister of Buddhist Affairs	United National Party	Wijetunga II	14th	
4		Sri Lankabhimanya; D. B. Wijetunga ඩිංගිරි බණ්ඩා විජේතුංග டிங்கிரி பண்ட விஜேதுங்க (1916–2008); Central	1 year, 6 months and 10 days		Minister of Defence; Minister of Finance; Minister of Buddhist Affairs	United National Party	Wijetunga II	14th	
4		Sri Lankabhimanya; D. B. Wijetunga ඩිංගිරි බණ්ඩා විජේතුංග டிங்கிரி பண்ட விஜேதுங்க (1916–2008); Central	Appointed as acting president following Premadasa's assassination. On 7 May 1993 he was elected by Parliament to the office of president under Article 40 of the Constitution.						
5		Chandrika Kumaratunga චන්ද්‍රිකා කුමාරතුංග சந்திரிகா பண்டாரநாயக்கே குமாரதுங்கா (born 1945); Western	12 November 1994	19 November 2005	Minister of Defence (1999–2005); Minister of Education	Sri Lanka Freedom Party (PA)	Kumaratunga	14th 15th	
5		Chandrika Kumaratunga චන්ද්‍රිකා කුමාරතුංග சந்திரிகா பண்டாரநாயக்கே குமாரதுங்கா (born 1945); Western	1994, 1999		Minister of Defence (1999–2005); Minister of Education	Sri Lanka Freedom Party (PA)	Kumaratunga	16th	
5		Chandrika Kumaratunga චන්ද්‍රිකා කුමාරතුංග சந்திரிகா பண்டாரநாயக்கே குமாரதுங்கா (born 1945); Western	11 years and 7 days		Minister of Defence (1999–2005); Minister of Education	Sri Lanka Freedom Party (PA)	Kumaratunga	17th	
5		Chandrika Kumaratunga චන්ද්‍රිකා කුමාරතුංග சந்திரிகா பண்டாரநாயக்கே குமாரதுங்கா (born 1945); Western	The first non-UNP president of the country. Victim of multiple assassination attempts by the LTTE, all of which were unsuccessful.						
6		Mahinda Rajapaksa මහින්ද රාජපක්ෂ மஹிந்த ராஜபக்ஷ (born 1945); Southern	19 November 2005	9 January 2015	Minister of Defence; Minister of Finance; Minister of Law & Order; Minister of Highways, Ports & Shipping	Sri Lanka Freedom Party (UPFA)	Mahinda Rajapaksa	17th 18th	
6		Mahinda Rajapaksa මහින්ද රාජපක්ෂ மஹிந்த ராஜபக்ஷ (born 1945); Southern	2005, 2010		Minister of Defence; Minister of Finance; Minister of Law & Order; Minister of Highways, Ports & Shipping	Sri Lanka Freedom Party (UPFA)	Mahinda Rajapaksa	17th 18th	
6		Mahinda Rajapaksa මහින්ද රාජපක්ෂ மஹிந்த ராஜபக்ஷ (born 1945); Southern	9 years, 1 month and 21 days		Minister of Defence; Minister of Finance; Minister of Law & Order; Minister of Highways, Ports & Shipping	Sri Lanka Freedom Party (UPFA)	Mahinda Rajapaksa	17th 18th	
6		Mahinda Rajapaksa මහින්ද රාජපක්ෂ மஹிந்த ராஜபக்ஷ (born 1945); Southern	Ended the Sri Lankan civil war with the LTTE. 18th Amendment to the Constitution was instated during his term. Failed to win reelection in 2015.						
7		Maithripala Sirisena මෛත්‍රීපාල සිරිසේන மைத்திரிபால சிறிசேன (born 1951); North Central	9 January 2015	18 November 2019	Minister of Defence; Minister of Mahaweli Development and Environment	Sri Lanka Freedom Party (Note: Elected as a New Democratic Front candidate.)	Sirisena I	18th	
7		Maithripala Sirisena මෛත්‍රීපාල සිරිසේන மைத்திரிபால சிறிசேன (born 1951); North Central	2015		Minister of Defence; Minister of Mahaweli Development and Environment	Sri Lanka Freedom Party	Sirisena II	19th	
7		Maithripala Sirisena මෛත්‍රීපාල සිරිසේන மைத்திரிபால சிறிசேன (born 1951); North Central	4 years, 10 months and 9 days		Minister of Defence; Minister of Mahaweli Development and Environment	Sri Lanka Freedom Party	Sirisena IV	19th	
7		Maithripala Sirisena මෛත්‍රීපාල සිරිසේන மைத்திரிபால சிறிசேன (born 1951); North Central	Defeated Rajapaksa in his unsuccessful bid for a third term. Ran as a candidate of the New Democratic Front with the backing of the UNP. 19th Amendment to the Constitution was instated during his term.						
8		Gotabaya Rajapaksa ගෝඨාභය රාජපක්ෂ கோட்டாபய ராஜபக்ஷ (born 1949); Southern	18 November 2019	14 July 2022	Minister of Defence; Minister of Technology	Sri Lanka Podujana Peramuna (SLPFA)	Rajapaksa I	19th	
8		Gotabaya Rajapaksa ගෝඨාභය රාජපක්ෂ கோட்டாபய ராஜபக்ஷ (born 1949); Southern	2019		Minister of Defence; Minister of Technology	Sri Lanka Podujana Peramuna (SLPFA)	Rajapaksa II	20th	
8		Gotabaya Rajapaksa ගෝඨාභය රාජපක්ෂ கோட்டாபய ராஜபக்ஷ (born 1949); Southern	2019		Minister of Defence; Minister of Technology	Sri Lanka Podujana Peramuna (SLPFA)	Rajapaksa III	20th	
8		Gotabaya Rajapaksa ගෝඨාභය රාජපක්ෂ கோட்டாபய ராஜபக்ஷ (born 1949); Southern	2 years, 7 months and 26 days		Minister of Defence; Minister of Technology	Sri Lanka Podujana Peramuna (SLPFA)	Rajapaksa IV	20th	
8		Gotabaya Rajapaksa ගෝඨාභය රාජපක්ෂ கோட்டாபய ராஜபக்ஷ (born 1949); Southern	Appointed Mahinda Rajapaksa as Prime Minister. 20th Amendment to the Constitution was instated during his term. Economic mismanagement led the country to an economic crisis, and a subsequent political crisis when he refused to resign in response to massive anti-government protests. Appointed Ranil Wickremesinghe as Prime Minister in May 2022, following Mahinda Rajapaksa's resignation. Resigned on 14 July, after fleeing the country the day before, designating Wickremesinghe as acting president.						
9		Ranil Wickremesinghe රනිල් වික්‍රමසිංහ ரணில் விக்ரமசிங்க (born 1949); Western	14 July 2022	20 July 2022	Minister of Defence; Minister of Technology; Minister of Finance; Minister of Women, Child Affairs and Social Empowerment	United National Party	Wickremesinghe	20th	
9		Ranil Wickremesinghe රනිල් වික්‍රමසිංහ ரணில் விக்ரமசிங்க (born 1949); Western	20 July 2022	23 September 2024	Minister of Defence; Minister of Technology; Minister of Finance; Minister of Women, Child Affairs and Social Empowerment	United National Party	Wickremesinghe	20th	
9		Ranil Wickremesinghe රනිල් වික්‍රමසිංහ ரணில் விக்ரமசிங்க (born 1949); Western	2022		Minister of Defence; Minister of Technology; Minister of Finance; Minister of Women, Child Affairs and Social Empowerment	United National Party	Wickremesinghe	20th	
9		Ranil Wickremesinghe රනිල් වික්‍රමසිංහ ரணில் விக்ரமசிங்க (born 1949); Western	2 years, 2 months and 9 days		Minister of Defence; Minister of Technology; Minister of Finance; Minister of Women, Child Affairs and Social Empowerment	United National Party	Wickremesinghe	20th	
9		Ranil Wickremesinghe රනිල් වික්‍රමසිංහ ரணில் விக்ரமசிங்க (born 1949); Western	Appointed as acting president following Rajapaksa's resignation. On 20 July 2022 he was elected by Parliament to the office of president under Article 40 of the Constitution. Failed to win reelection in 2024.						
10		Anura Kumara Dissanayake අනුර කුමාර දිසානායක அநுர குமார திசாநாயக்க (born 1968); Western	23 September 2024	Incumbent	Minister of Defence; Minister of Finance	Janatha Vimukthi Peramuna (NPP)	Dissanayake I	20th	
10		Anura Kumara Dissanayake අනුර කුමාර දිසානායක அநுர குமார திசாநாயக்க (born 1968); Western	2024		Minister of Defence; Minister of Finance	Janatha Vimukthi Peramuna (NPP)	Dissanayake II	21st	
10		Anura Kumara Dissanayake අනුර කුමාර දිසානායක அநுர குமார திசாநாயக்க (born 1968); Western	2 years, 1 month and 24 days		Minister of Defence; Minister of Finance	Janatha Vimukthi Peramuna (NPP)	Dissanayake II	21st	
10		Anura Kumara Dissanayake අනුර කුමාර දිසානායක அநுர குமார திசாநாயக்க (born 1968); Western	Defeated Sajith Premadasa and Ranil Wickremesinghe in a three-way contest.						

== See also ==
- Presidential Secretariat
- List of prime ministers of Sri Lanka
