= Premadasa cabinet =

- 11th Cabinet of Sri Lanka

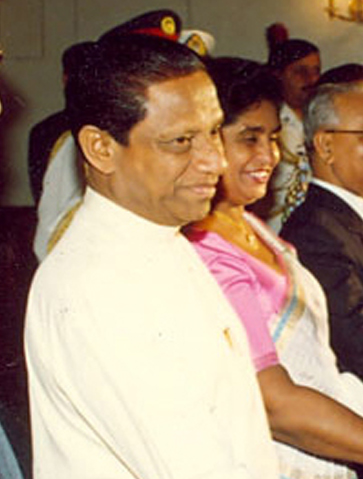
- Date formed: 2 January 1989
- Date dissolved: 1 May 1993

People and organisations
- Head of state: Ranasinghe Premadasa
- Head of government: Ranasinghe Premadasa
- Deputy head of government: D. B. Wijetunga
- No. of ministers: 30 (1989-1990); 26 (1990-1991)
- Total no. of members: 30
- Member parties: United National Party; Ceylon Workers' Congress
- Status in legislature: Majority government
- Opposition party: Sri Lanka Freedom Party
- Opposition leader: Sirimavo Bandaranaike

History
- Elections: 1988, 1989
- Legislature term: 9th
- Predecessor: Jayewardene
- Successor: Wijetunga

The Premadasa cabinet was the central government of Sri Lanka led by President Ranasinghe Premadasa between 1989 and 1993. It was formed in January 1989 after the presidential election and it ended in May 1993 with Premadasa's assassination.

== Cabinet members ==
Name	Portrait	Party	Office	Took office	Left office	Refs
Ranasinghe Premadasa		United National Party	President	2 January 1989	1 May 1993	
Ranasinghe Premadasa		United National Party	Minister of Defence	1989		
Ranasinghe Premadasa		United National Party	Minister of Buddha Sasana	1989		
Ranasinghe Premadasa		United National Party	Minister of Policy Planning and Implementation	1989		
D. B. Wijetunga		United National Party	Prime Minister	6 March 1989	28 March 1990	
D. B. Wijetunga		United National Party	Prime Minister	30 March 1990	7 May 1993	
D. B. Wijetunga		United National Party	Minister of Finance	18 February 1989	(Note: Continued to hold same office in next cabinet.)	
D. B. Wijetunga		United National Party	Minister of Labour and Social Welfare	11 January 1990		
D. B. Wijetunga		United National Party	Minister of Labour and Vocational Training	14 March 1991		
A. M. S. Adhikari		United National Party	Minister of Tourism	18 February 1989	28 March 1990	
A. M. S. Adhikari		United National Party	Minister of Reconstruction, Rehabilitation and Social Welfare	30 March 1990	14 March 1991	
A. M. S. Adhikari		United National Party	Minister of Posts and Telecommunications	14 March 1991		
Alick Aluwihare		United National Party	Minister of Posts and Telecommunications	18 February 1989	14 March 1991	
Alick Aluwihare		United National Party	Minister of Ports and Shipping	14 March 1991		
Ranjit Atapattu		United National Party	Minister of Labour and Social Welfare	18 February 1989	5 January 1990	
Lalith Athulathmudali		United National Party	Minister of Agriculture, Food and Co-operatives	18 February 1989	28 March 1990	
Lalith Athulathmudali		United National Party	Minister of Education and Higher Education	30 March 1990		
Gamini Atukorale		United National Party	Minister of Lands, Irrigation and Mahaweli Development	14 March 1991		
R. M. Dharmadasa Banda		United National Party	Minister of Agriculture Development and Research	30 March 1990		
K. D. M. C. Bandara		United National Party	Minister of Power and Energy	30 March 1990		
Sirisena Cooray		United National Party	Minister of Housing and Construction	18 February 1989		
P. Dayaratna		United National Party	Minister of Lands, Irrigation and Mahaweli Development	18 February 1989	14 March 1991	
P. Dayaratna		United National Party	Minister of Reconstruction, Rehabilitation and Social Welfare	14 March 1991		
Gamini Dissanayake		United National Party	Minister of Plantation Industries	18 February 1989	1990	
Tyronne Fernando		United National Party	Minister of Information			
A. C. S. Hameed		United National Party	Minister of Higher Education, Science and Technology	18 February 1989	28 March 1990	
A. C. S. Hameed		United National Party	Minister of Justice	30 March 1990		
Harold Herath		United National Party	Minister of Foreign Affairs	30 March 1990		
Renuka Herath		United National Party	Minister of Health and Women's Affairs	18 February 1989		
Rupa Karunathilake		United National Party	Minister of Ports and Shipping	30 March 1990	14 March 1991	
Rupa Karunathilake		United National Party	Minister of Plantation Industries	14 March 1991		
W. J. M. Lokubandara		United National Party	Minister of Education, Cultural Affairs and Information	18 February 1989	28 March 1990	
W. J. M. Lokubandara		United National Party	Minister of Cultural Affairs and Information	30 March 1990		
Weerasinghe Mallimarachchi		United National Party	Minister of Food and Co-operatives	30 March 1990		
Nanda Mathew		United National Party	Minister of Youth Affairs and Sports	18 February 1989		
Wijayapala Mendis		United National Party	Minister of Transport and Highways	18 February 1989		
Abdul Razak Munsoor		United National Party	Minister of Trade and Shipping	18 February 1989	28 March 1990	
Abdul Razak Munsoor		United National Party	Minister of Trade and Commerce	30 March 1990		
Festus Perera		United National Party	Minister of Power and Energy	18 February 1989	28 March 1990	
Festus Perera		United National Party	Minister of Public Administration, Provincial Councils and Home Affairs	30 March 1990		
M. Joseph Michael Perera		United National Party	Minister of Fisheries and Aquatic Research	18 February 1989		
M. Vincent Perera		United National Party	Minister of Justice and Parliamentary Affairs	18 February 1989	28 March 1990	
M. Vincent Perera		United National Party	Minister of Environment and Parliamentary Affairs	30 March 1990		
G. M. Premachandra		United National Party	Minister of Labour and Vocational Training	30 March 1990		
Savumiamoorthy Thondaman		Ceylon Workers' Congress	Minister of Textiles and Rural Industrial Development	18 February 1989	28 March 1990	
Savumiamoorthy Thondaman		Ceylon Workers' Congress	Minister of Tourism and Rural Industrial Development	30 March 1990		
Wimal Wickramasinghe		United National Party	Minister of Environment and Parliamentary Affairs	14 March 1991		
Ranil Wickremasinghe		United National Party	Minister of Industries	18 February 1989	28 March 1990	
Ranil Wickremasinghe		United National Party	Minister of Industries, Science and Technology	30 March 1990		
U. B. Wijekoon		United National Party	Minister of Public Administration, Provincial Councils and Home Affairs	18 February 1989	28 March 1990	
U. B. Wijekoon		United National Party	Minister of Handlooms and Textile Industries	30 March 1990		
Ranjan Wijeratne		United National Party	Minister of Foreign Affairs	18 February 1989	28 March 1990	
Ranjan Wijeratne		United National Party	Minister of Plantation Industries	30 March 1990	2 March 1991	

== Non-cabinet ministers ==
Name	Portrait	Party	Office	Took office	Left office	Refs
M. L. M. Aboosally		United National Party	Non-Cabinet Minister of Plantation Services	30 March 1990		
John Amaratunga		United National Party	Non-Cabinet Minister of Provincial Councils	30 March 1990		
Gamini Atukorale		United National Party	Non-Cabinet Minister of Mahaweli Development	30 March 1990	14 March 1991	
J. P. Wijeratne Banda		United National Party	Non-Cabinet Minister of Agriculture Production and Marketing	30 March 1990		
Harindra Corea		United National Party	Non-Cabinet Minister of Telecommunication Development	30 March 1990		
Tyronne Fernando		United National Party	Non-Cabinet Minister of Legal and Prison Reform	30 March 1990		
Chandra Gankanda		United National Party	Non-Cabinet Minister of Handloom Industry	30 March 1990		
A. C. S. Hameed		United National Party	Non-Cabinet Minister of Higher Education	30 March 1990		
Indradasa Hettiarachchi		United National Party	Non-Cabinet Minister of Coconut Industries and Crop Diversification	30 March 1990		
Ariyaratne Jayatilleke		United National Party	Non-Cabinet Minister of Minerals and Mineral Based Industries	30 March 1990		
P. B. Kaviratne		United National Party	Non-Cabinet Minister of Socio-Cultural Integration	30 March 1990		
E. P. Paul Perera		United National Party	Non-Cabinet Minister of Science and Technology	30 March 1990		
Sarath Chandra Rajakaruna		United National Party	Non-Cabinet Minister of Energy Conservation	30 March 1990		
Sunethra Ranasinghe		United National Party	Non-Cabinet Minister of Education Services	30 March 1990		
Chandra Ranatunga		United National Party	Non-Cabinet Minister of Construction and Building Materials	30 March 1990		
Amara Piyaseeli Ratnayake		United National Party	Non-Cabinet Minister of Home Affairs	30 March 1990		
Senaraja Samaranayake		United National Party	Non-Cabinet Minister of Export Development	30 March 1990		
Asoka Wadigamangawa		United National Party	Non-Cabinet Minister of Lands and Land Alienation	30 March 1990		
H. B. Wanninayake		United National Party	Non-Cabinet Minister of Indigenous Medicine	30 March 1990		
Wimal Wickramasinghe		United National Party	Non-Cabinet Minister of Environment	30 March 1990	14 March 1991	
Dayananda A. Wickremasinghe		United National Party	Non-Cabinet Minister of Human Resource Mobilisation	30 March 1990		
Mahendra Wijeratne		United National Party	Non-Cabinet Minister of Livestock Development and Milk Production	30 March 1990		
R. P. Wijesiri		United National Party	Non-Cabinet Minister of Up-Country Peasantry Rehabilitation	30 March 1990	18 December 1990	

== Ministers of state ==
Name	Portrait	Party	Office	Took office	Left office	Refs
Rohan Abeygunsekera		United National Party	Minister of State for Higher Education	18 February 1989	28 March 1990	
Rohan Abeygunsekera		United National Party	Minister of State for Trade and Commerce	30 March 1990		
M. L. M. Aboosally		United National Party	Minister of State for Plantation Industries	18 February 1989	28 March 1990	
John Amaratunga		United National Party	Minister of State for Foreign Affairs	18 February 1989	28 March 1990	
G. Tissakutti Arachchi		United National Party	Minister of State for Parliamentary Affairs	30 March 1990		
D. M. Ariyadasa		United National Party	Minister of State for Sports	18 February 1989		
Gamini Atukorale		United National Party	Minister of State for Mahaweli Development	18 February 1989	28 March 1990	
A. H. M. Azwer		United National Party	Minister of State for Muslim Religious and Cultural Affairs	30 March 1990		
J. P. Wijeratne Banda		United National Party	Minister of State for Agriculture	18 February 1989	28 March 1990	
R. M. Dharmadasa Banda		United National Party	Minister of State for Up-Country Peasantry Rehabilitation	22 February 1989	28 March 1990	
K. D. M. C. Bandara		United National Party	Minister of State for Public Administration	18 February 1989	28 March 1990	
Jabir A. Cader		United National Party	Minister of State for Muslim Religious and Cultural Affairs	18 February 1989	28 March 1990	
Jabir A. Cader		United National Party	Minister of State for Health	30 March 1990		
Mervyn J. Cooray		United National Party	Minister of State for Power and Energy	18 February 1989		
Harindra Corea		United National Party	Minister of State for Ports and Telecommunication	18 February 1989	28 March 1990	
P. M. B. Cyril		United National Party	Minister of State for Health	18 February 1989	28 March 1990	
Upali Dassanayake		United National Party	Minister of State for Parliamentary Affairs	18 February 1989	28 March 1990	
P. P. Devaraj		Ceylon Workers' Congress	Minister of State for Hindu Religious and Cultural Affairs	18 February 1989		
U. L. M. Farook		United National Party	Minister of State for Transport	30 March 1990		
Tyronne Fernando		United National Party	Minister of State for Justice	18 February 1989	28 March 1990	
P. S. L. Galappatthy		United National Party	Minister of State for Fisheries and Aquatic Resources	18 February 1989		
Lal Gamage		United National Party	Minister of State for Buddha Sasana	18 February 1989		
Chandra Gankanda		United National Party	Minister of State for Youth Affairs	18 February 1989	28 March 1990	
M. D. A. Gunathilaka		United National Party	Minister of State for Textile Industries	30 March 1990		
Harold Herath		United National Party	Minister of State for Finance	18 February 1989		
Indradasa Hettiarachchi		United National Party	Minister of State for Shipping	18 February 1989	28 March 1990	
Ariyaratne Jayatilleke		United National Party	Minister of State for Minerals and Mineral Based Industries	18 February 1989	28 March 1990	
Chandra Karunaratne		United National Party	Minister of State for Transport	30 March 1990		
Samantha Karunaratne		United National Party	Minister of State for Social Welfare	18 February 1989	28 March 1990	
Samantha Karunaratne		United National Party	Minister of State for Reconstruction, Rehabilitation and Social Welfare	30 March 1990		
Rupa Karunathilake		United National Party	Minister of State for Provincial Councils	18 February 1989	28 March 1990	
P. B. Kaviratne		United National Party	Minister of State for Cultural Affairs	18 February 1989	28 March 1990	
Ananda Kularatne		United National Party	Minister of State for Highways	18 February 1989		
H. M. A. Lokubanda		United National Party	Minister of State for Women's Affairs	18 February 1989	28 March 1990	
H. M. A. Lokubanda		United National Party	Minister of State for Agricultural Development and Research	30 March 1990		
Gamini Lokuge		United National Party	Minister of State for Tourism	18 February 1989		
M. E. H. Maharoof		United National Party	Minister of State for Ports and Shipping	30 March 1990		
Weerasinghe Mallimarachchi		United National Party	Minister of State for Industries	18 February 1989	28 March 1990	
Imthiaz Bakeer Markar		United National Party	Minister of State for Housing	18 February 1989		
H. G. P. Nelson		United National Party	Minister of State for Irrigation	18 February 1989	28 March 1990	
H. G. P. Nelson		United National Party	Minister of State for Rural Industrial Development	30 March 1990		
E. P. Paul Perera		United National Party	Minister of State for Science and Technology	18 February 1989	28 March 1990	
K. Vincent Perera		United National Party	Minister of State for Rehabilitation and Reconstruction	18 February 1989	28 March 1990	
G. M. Premachandra		United National Party	Minister of State for Food	18 February 1989	28 March 1990	
Rasamanohari Pulendran		United National Party	Minister of State for Education	30 March 1990		
Sarath Chandra Rajakaruna		United National Party	Minister of State for Coconut Industries	18 February 1989	28 March 1990	
A. J. Ranasinghe		United National Party	Minister of State for Information	18 February 1989		
Sunethra Ranasinghe		United National Party	Minister of State for Education	18 February 1989	28 March 1990	
Chandra Ranatunga		United National Party	Minister of State for Construction	18 February 1989	28 March 1990	
Amara Piyaseeli Ratnayake		United National Party	Minister of State for Home Affairs	18 February 1989	28 March 1990	
Senaraja Samaranayake		United National Party	Minister of State for Trade	18 February 1989	28 March 1990	
Ravindra Samaraweera		United National Party	Minister of State for Co-operatives	18 February 1989	28 March 1990	
Ravindra Samaraweera		United National Party	Minister of State for Food and co-operatives	30 March 1990		
Weerawanni Samaraweera		United National Party	Minister of State for Plantation	18 February 1989	28 March 1990	
M. S. Sellasamy		Ceylon Workers' Congress	Minister of State for Transport	18 February 1989	28 March 1990	
M. S. Sellasamy		Ceylon Workers' Congress	Minister of State for Industries	30 March 1990		
Lakshman Senewiratne		United National Party	Minister of State for Labour	18 February 1989	28 March 1990	
Lakshman Senewiratne		United National Party	Minister of State for Labour and Vocational Training	30 March 1990		
Asoka Wadigamangawa		United National Party	Minister of State for Lands	18 February 1989	28 March 1990	
H. B. Wanninayake		United National Party	Minister of State for Indigenous Medicine	18 February 1989	28 March 1990	
Sarath Welagedara		United National Party	Minister of State for Irrigation	30 March 1990		
Wimal Wickramasinghe		United National Party	Minister of State for Policy Planning and Implementation	18 February 1989	14 March 1991	
Dayananda A. Wickremasinghe		United National Party	Minister of State for Textiles	18 February 1989	28 March 1990	
Mahendra Wijeratne		United National Party	Minister of State for Animal Husbandry	18 February 1989	28 March 1990	
Ranjan Wijeratne		United National Party	Minister of State for Defence	18 February 1989	2 March 1991	
D. B. Wijetunga		United National Party	Minister of State for Defence	6 March 1991		
R. P. Wijesiri		United National Party	Minister of State for Rural Industrial Development	18 February 1989	28 March 1990	

== District ministers ==
Name	Portrait	Party	Office	Took office	Left office	Refs
Weerasinghe Mallimarachchi		United National Party	District Minister for Colombo			
