= 10th Parliament of Sri Lanka =

1994–2000 meeting of the Sri Lankan legislature

←	9th	11th	→

Overview
- Legislative body: Parliament of Sri Lanka
- Term: 25 August 1994 – 18 August 2000
- Election: 16 August 1994

Senior parliamentarians
- Speaker: K. B. Ratnayake
- Deputy Speaker and Chairman of Committees: Anil Moonesinghe, PA
- Deputy Chairman of Committees: Rauff Hakeem, SLMC
- Prime Minister: Chandrika Kumaratunga, PA (1994); Sirimavo Bandaranaike, PA (1994–2000); Ratnasiri Wickremanayake, PA (2000)
- Leader of the Opposition: Gamini Dissanayake, UNP (1994); Ranil Wickremesinghe, UNP (1994–2000)
- Leader of the House: Ratnasiri Wickremanayake, PA
- Chief Government Whip: Richard Pathirana, PA
- Chief Opposition Whip: Wijayapala Mendis, UNP (1994–98); W. J. M. Lokubandara, UNP (1998–2000)

Sessions
- 1st: 25 August 1994 – 15 December 1994
- 2nd: 6 January 1995 – 12 January 1996
- 3rd: 9 February 1996 – 18 August 2000

The 10th Parliament of Sri Lanka, known officially as the 3rd Parliament of the Democratic Socialist Republic of Sri Lanka, was a meeting of the Parliament of Sri Lanka, with the membership determined by the results of the 1994 parliamentary election held on 16 August 1994. The parliament met for the first time on 25 August 1994 and was dissolved on 18 August 2000.

== Election ==
The 10th parliamentary election was held on 16 August 1994. The People's Alliance (PA), an alliance of opposition parties, became the largest group in Parliament by winning 105 of the 225 seats. The incumbent United National Party (UNP) won 94 seats. The Eelam People's Democratic Party (EPDP), a government-backed Tamil paramilitary group, won 9 seats and the Sri Lanka Muslim Congress (SLMC) won 7 seats. Smaller parties won the remaining 10 seats.

=== Results ===
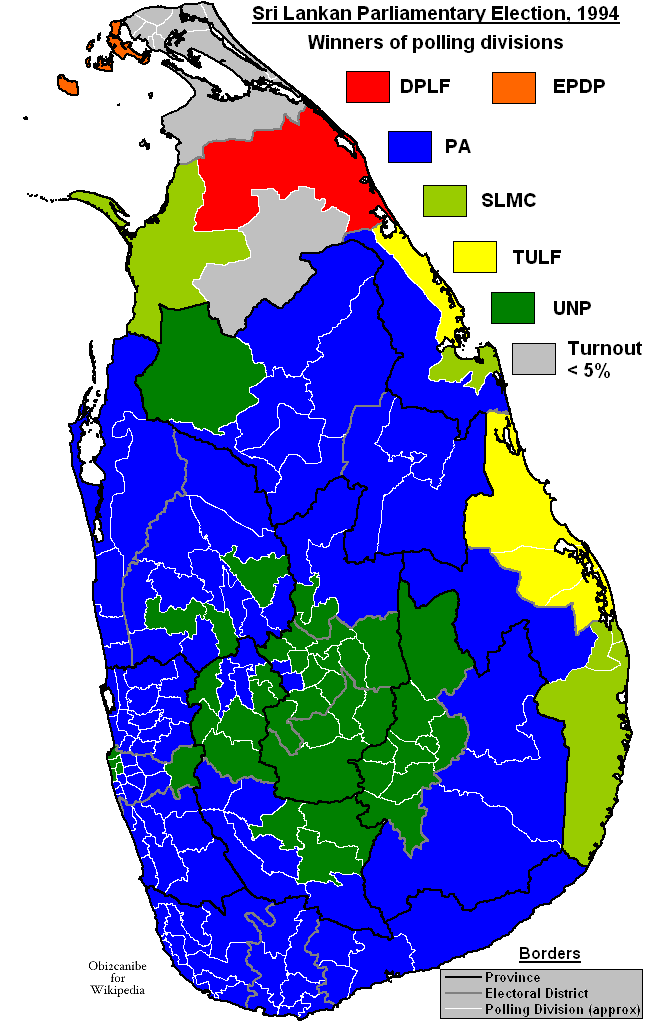
Winners of polling divisions. PA in blue and UNP in green.

Alliance	Votes	%	Seats
People's Alliance	3,887,823	48.94%	105
United National Party	3,498,370	44.04%	94
Eelam People's Democratic Party	10,744	0.14%	9
Sri Lanka Muslim Congress	143,307	1.80%	7
Tamil United Liberation Front	132,461	1.67%	5
Democratic People's Liberation Front; Eelam Revolutionary Organisation of Students; People's Liberation Organisation of Tamil Eelam; Tamil Eelam Liberation Organization	38,028	0.48%	3
Sri Lanka Progressive Front	90,078	1.13%	1
Others	142,895	1.80%	1
Total	7,943,706	100.00%	225

The new parliament was sworn in on 25 August 1994. K. B. Ratnayake was elected Speaker, Anil Moonesinghe was elected Deputy Speaker and Rauff Hakeem was elected Deputy Chairman of Committees.

== Government ==
The PA was able to form a government with the support of the seven SLMC MPs and one independent MP.

On 19 August 1994, President D. B. Wijetunga appointed Chandrika Kumaratunga, the leader of the PA, as Prime Minister. The rest of the cabinet was sworn in on the same day.

Prime Minister Kumaratunga was elected president in the 1994 presidential elections. On 14 November 1994, Kumaratunga appointed her mother Sirimavo Bandaranaike as Prime Minister. Prime Minister Bandaranaike retired on 10 August 2000 and was replaced by Ratnasiri Wickremanayake.

President Kumaratunga dissolved parliament on 18 August 2000.

== Members ==
=== Deaths and resignations ===
The 10th parliament saw the following deaths and resignations:

- 1994 – J. P. V. Vipulaguna (SLPF/HAM) resigned. Replaced by Nihal Galappaththi (SLPF/HAM).
- 24 October 1994 – Gamini Dissanayake (UNP/KAN), Weerasinghe Mallimarachchi (UNP/COL) and Ossie Abeygunasekara (UNP/COL) assassinated. Replaced by P. P. Devaraj (UNP/COL) and Ramaiah Yogarajan (UNP/COL).
- 12 November 1994 – Chandrika Kumaratunga (PA/GAM) vacated her seat to take up presidency.
- 11 February 1997 – Nalanda Ellawala (PA/RAT) murdered.
- 5 July 1997 – A. Thangathurai (TULF/TRI) assassinated.
- 20 July 1997 – M. E. H. Maharoof (UNP/TRI) assassinated.
- 30 December 1997 – Bernard Soysa (PA/COL) died. Replaced by Dixon J. Perera (PA/COL).
- 15 July 1998 – Sarawanabavanandan "Vasanthan" Shanmuganathan (DPLF/VAN) murdered.
- 29 July 1999 – Neelan Tiruchelvam (TULF/NAT) assassinated. Replaced by Mavai Senathirajah (TULF/NAT).
- 3 September 1999 – A. C. S. Hameed (UNP/KAN) died.
- 30 October 1999 – Savumiamoorthy Thondaman (PA/NAT) died.
- 2 November 1999 – Nadarajah "Ramesh" Atputharajah (EPDP/JAF) assassinated.
- 7 June 2000 – C. V. Gunaratne (PA/COL) assassinated.

=== List ===
Name	Electoral District	Preference Votes	Member From	Member To	Elected Party	Elected Alliance	Final Party	Final Alliance	Notes
Abeygunasekara, Ossie	COL	98,022	25 August 1994	24 October 1994	UNP	UNP	UNP	UNP	Murdered.
Abeywardena, Lakshman Yapa	MTR	52,294	25 August 1994	18 August 2000	UNP	UNP	UNP	UNP	
Abeywardena, Vajira	GAL	81,373	25 August 1994	18 August 2000	UNP	UNP	UNP	UNP	
Adhikari, A. M. S.	ANU	44,650	25 August 1994	18 August 2000	UNP	UNP	UNP	UNP	
Alahapperuma, Dullas	MTR	76,678	25 August 1994	18 August 2000	SLFP	PA	SLFP	PA	
Alavi, A. H. M.	KUR	52,381	25 August 1994	18 August 2000	UNP	UNP	UNP	UNP	
Aluvihare, Alick	MTL	61,526	25 August 1994	18 August 2000	UNP	UNP	UNP	UNP	
Amaratunga, John	GAM	122,813	25 August 1994	18 August 2000	UNP	UNP	UNP	UNP	
Amaraweera, Mahinda	HAM	39,376	25 August 1994	18 August 2000	SLFP	PA	SLFP	PA	
Amunugama, Sarath	KAN	53,997	25 August 1994	18 August 2000	UNP	UNP		PA	
Arachchi, K. A. W. K.	KAN	63,969	25 August 1994	18 August 2000	SLFP	PA	SLFP	PA	
Ashraff, M. H. M.	AMP	69,076	25 August 1994	18 August 2000	SLMC		SLMC	PA	
Athukorala, Gamini	RAT	82,869	25 August 1994	18 August 2000	UNP	UNP	UNP	UNP	
Athulathmudali, Srimanee	COL	148,727	25 August 1994	18 August 2000	DUNF (L)	PA	DUNF (L)	PA	
Atputharajah, Nadarajah	JAF	968	25 August 1994	2 November 1999	EPDP	IND	EPDP	PA	Murdered.
Attanayake, Tissa	KAN	60,531	25 August 1994	18 August 2000	UNP	UNP	UNP	UNP	
Bakaar, S. S. M. Abu	VAN	4,269	25 August 1994	18 August 2000	SLMC		SLMC	PA	
Bakmeewewa, Nihal Yasendra	AMP	29,061	25 August 1994	18 August 2000	UNP	UNP	UNP	UNP	
Balachandran, Vaithilingam	VAN	4,515	25 August 1994	18 August 2000	PLOTE	DPLF	PLOTE	DPLF	
Balasooriya, Arachchilage Jagath	KEG	59,017	25 August 1994	18 August 2000	SLFP	PA	SLFP	PA	
Banda, Gopallawa Moithra Kuda	MTL	40,555	25 August 1994	18 August 2000	SLFP	PA	SLFP	PA	
Banda, H. M. A. L.	KUR	50,535	25 August 1994	18 August 2000	UNP	UNP	UNP	UNP	
Banda, R. M. Dharmadasa	MON	44,956	25 August 1994	18 August 2000	UNP	UNP	UNP	UNP	
Bandara, R. M. Ranjith Madduma	MON	36,747	25 August 1994	18 August 2000	UNP	UNP	UNP	UNP	
Bandaranaike, Anura	NAT		25 August 1994	18 August 2000	UNP	UNP	UNP	UNP	
Bandaranaike, D. M.	KUR	50,901	25 August 1994	18 August 2000	UNP	UNP	UNP	UNP	
Bandaranaike, Sirimavo	NAT		25 August 1994	18 August 2000	SLFP	PA	SLFP	PA	Prime Minister (94-00).
Baskaran, Umapathisivam	JAF	1,056	25 August 1994	18 August 2000	EPDP	IND	EPDP	PA	
Basnayake, Bandula	KUR	56,609	25 August 1994	18 August 2000	SLFP	PA	SLFP	PA	
Cader, A. R. M. Abdul	KAN	66,136	25 August 1994	18 August 2000	UNP	UNP	UNP	UNP	
Chandradasa, A. P. G.	AMP	40,675	25 August 1994	18 August 2000	UNP	UNP	UNP	UNP	
Chandrakumar, Murugesu	JAF	798	25 August 1994	18 August 2000	EPDP	IND	EPDP	PA	
Chandrasekaran, Periyasamy	NUW	23,453	25 August 1994	18 August 2000	UCPF	IND	UCPF	PA	
Chandrawansha, A. J.	KUR	51,691	25 August 1994	18 August 2000	UNP	UNP	UNP	UNP	
Cooray, Nawalaage Benet	COL	66,976	25 August 1994	18 August 2000	SLFP	PA	SLFP	PA	
Cooray, Reginold	KAL	85,297	25 August 1994	18 August 2000	SLFP	PA	SLFP	PA	
Dassanayake, D. M.	PUT	39,793	25 August 1994	18 August 2000	SLFP	PA	SLFP	PA	
Dayaratna, Petikirige	AMP	45,411	25 August 1994	18 August 2000	UNP	UNP	UNP	UNP	
de Mel, Ronnie	MTR	66,563	25 August 1994	18 August 2000	UNP	UNP		PA	
de Silva, Asoka Weerasinghe	GAL	45,022	25 August 1994	18 August 2000	SLFP	PA	SLFP	PA	
de Silva, Nimal Siripala	COL	111,730	25 August 1994	18 August 2000	SLFP	PA	SLFP	PA	
Devananda, Douglas	JAF	2,091	25 August 1994	18 August 2000	EPDP	IND	EPDP	PA	
Devaraj, P. P.	COL			18 August 2000	CWC	UNP	CWC	PA	
Dissanayake, Berty Premalal	ANU	78,792	25 August 1994	18 August 2000	SLFP	PA	SLFP	PA	
Dissanayake, Gamini	KAN	198,207	25 August 1994	24 October 1994	UNP	UNP	UNP	UNP	Leader of the Opposition (94). Murdered.
Dissanayake, Punchi Banda	ANU	46,756	25 August 1994	18 August 2000	SLFP	PA	SLFP	PA	
Dissanayake, S. B.	NUW	38,372	25 August 1994	18 August 2000	SLFP	PA	SLFP	PA	
Dissanayake, Salinda	KUR	57,641	25 August 1994	18 August 2000	SLFP	PA	SLFP	PA	
Dodangoda, Amarasiri	GAL	176,151	25 August 1994	18 August 2000	SLFP	PA	SLFP	PA	
Dunstan, A. M. U. S.	GAL	53,577	25 August 1994	18 August 2000	UNP	UNP	UNP	UNP	
Ekanayake, Nandimithra	MTL	51,919	25 August 1994	18 August 2000	SLFP	PA	SLFP	PA	
Ekanayake, T. B.	KUR	59,313	25 August 1994	18 August 2000	SLFP	PA	SLFP	PA	
Fernando, K. G. J.	PUT	55,373	25 August 1994	18 August 2000	SLFP	PA	SLFP	PA	
Fernando, Milroy	PUT	43,366	25 August 1994	18 August 2000	SLFP	PA	SLFP	PA	
Fernando, Tyronne	COL	42,872	25 August 1994	18 August 2000	UNP	UNP	UNP	UNP	
Fernandopulle, Jeyaraj	GAM	102,129	25 August 1994	18 August 2000	SLFP	PA	SLFP	PA	
Fowzie, A. H. M.	COL	72,294	25 August 1994	18 August 2000	SLFP	PA	SLFP	PA	
Gajadeera, Chandrasiri	MTR	62,852	25 August 1994	18 August 2000	SLFP	PA	SLFP	PA	
Galappaththi, Nihal	HAM			18 August 2000	JVP	SLPF	JVP	SLPF	Replaces J. P. V. Vipulaguna.
Gamage, Piyasena	GAL	67,033	25 August 1994	18 August 2000	SLFP	PA	SLFP	PA	
Gunaratne, C. V.	COL	114,756	25 August 1994	7 June 2000	SLFP	PA	SLFP	PA	Murdered.
Gunaratne, K. D. U.	GAM	55,328	25 August 1994	18 August 2000	SLFP	PA	SLFP	PA	
Gunasinghe, K. A. N.	GAL	46,948	25 August 1994	18 August 2000	SLFP	PA	SLFP	PA	
Gunawardena, G. L. S.	GAL	56,568	25 August 1994	18 August 2000	UNP	UNP	UNP	UNP	
Gunawardena, Indika	COL	58,753	25 August 1994	18 August 2000	SLFP	PA	SLFP	PA	
Hakeem, Rauff	NAT		25 August 1994	18 August 2000	SLMC		SLMC	PA	Deputy Chairman of Committees (94-00).
Hameed, Abdul Cader Shahul	KAN	61,906	25 August 1994	3 September 1999	UNP	UNP	UNP	UNP	Died.
Hapangama, Anura Pradeep	GAM	62,829	25 August 1994	18 August 2000	UNP	UNP	UNP	UNP	
Harrison, Palisge	ANU	34,666	25 August 1994	18 August 2000	UNP	UNP	UNP	UNP	
Heenmahaththaya, U. L.	RAT	47,122	25 August 1994	18 August 2000	SLFP	PA	SLFP	PA	
Herath, H. M. N.	POL	26,213	25 August 1994	18 August 2000	SLFP	PA	SLFP	PA	
Herath, Harold	PUT	37,538	25 August 1994	18 August 2000	UNP	UNP	UNP	UNP	
Herath, Maheepala	KEG	52,221	25 August 1994	18 August 2000	SLFP	PA	SLFP	PA	
Herath, Renuka	NUW	49,473	25 August 1994	18 August 2000	UNP	UNP	UNP	UNP	
Hizbullah, M. L. Alim Mohamed	BAT	12,583	25 August 1994	18 August 2000	SLMC		SLMC	PA	
Illias, Aithurus M.	JAF	1,575	25 August 1994	18 August 2000	SLMC		SLMC	PA	
Jayakody, Lakshman	GAM	88,628	25 August 1994	18 August 2000	SLFP	PA	SLFP	PA	
Jayaratne, D. M.	KAN	101,558	25 August 1994	18 August 2000	SLFP	PA	SLFP	PA	
Jayasena, Sumedha	MON	55,369	25 August 1994	18 August 2000	SLFP	PA	SLFP	PA	
Jayasinghe, Athula Nimalasiri	GAM	65,623	25 August 1994	18 August 2000	SLFP	PA	SLFP	PA	
Jayasinghe, Chandrani Bandara	ANU	66,538	25 August 1994	18 August 2000	UNP	UNP	UNP	UNP	
Jayawardena, A. M.	MON	27,080	25 August 1994	18 August 2000	SLFP	PA	SLFP	PA	
Jayawardena, Lucky	KAN	66,340	25 August 1994	18 August 2000	UNP	UNP	UNP	UNP	
Jinadasa, Vidana Gamage	MTL	35,474	25 August 1994	18 August 2000	UNP	UNP	UNP	UNP	
Kadirgamar, Lakshman	NAT		25 August 1994	18 August 2000	SLFP	PA	SLFP	PA	
Kalugalla, P. B .G.	KEG	73,369	25 August 1994	18 August 2000	SLFP	PA	SLFP	PA	
Karalliyadde, Tissa	ANU	44,849	25 August 1994	18 August 2000	SLFP	PA	SLFP	PA	
Karunanayake, Ravi	NAT		25 August 1994	18 August 2000	DUNF (L)	PA	UNP	UNP	
Karunarathna, Thilak	KAL	63,206	25 August 1994	18 August 2000	UNP	UNP	UNP	UNP	
Karunathilake, Rupa	GAL	52,577	25 August 1994	18 August 2000	UNP	UNP	UNP	UNP	
Kiriella, Lakshman	KAN	59,463	25 August 1994	18 August 2000	SLFP	PA	SLFP	PA	
Kodituwakku, Karunasena	COL	46,134	25 August 1994	18 August 2000	UNP	UNP	UNP	UNP	
Koralage, J. N. M.	GAM	58,237	25 August 1994	18 August 2000	SLFP	PA	SLFP	PA	
Kularathne, Ananda	HAM	36,965	25 August 1994	18 August 2000	UNP	UNP	UNP	UNP	
Kumaranatunga, Jeewan	COL	95,767	25 August 1994	18 August 2000	SLFP	PA	SLFP	PA	
Kumaratunga, Chandrika	GAM	464,588	25 August 1994	12 November 1994	SLFP	PA	SLFP	PA	Prime Minister (94). Elected President.
Lionel, B. A. P.	GAM	57,091	25 August 1994	18 August 2000	SLFP	PA	SLFP	PA	
Lokubandara, W. J. M.	BAD	78,845	25 August 1994	18 August 2000	UNP	UNP	UNP	UNP	Chief Opposition Whip (98-00).
Lokuge, Gamini	COL	47,058	25 August 1994	18 August 2000	UNP	UNP	UNP	UNP	
Mahalekam, T. B.	POL	26,465	25 August 1994	18 August 2000	SLFP	PA	SLFP	PA	
Maharoof, Mohamed	TRI	17,043	25 August 1994	20 July 1997	UNP	UNP	UNP	UNP	Murdered.
Maithripala, U. S. H.	RAT	49,481	25 August 1994	18 August 2000	UNP	UNP	UNP	UNP	
Makar, Imithiyas Bakeer	KAL	68,519	25 August 1994	18 August 2000	UNP	UNP	UNP	UNP	
Mallimarachchi, Weerasinghe	COL	44,322	25 August 1994	24 October 1994	UNP	UNP	UNP	UNP	Murdered.
Matthew, Nanda	RAT	47,176	25 August 1994	18 August 2000	UNP	UNP		PA	
Mendis, Wijayapala	GAM	96,559	25 August 1994	18 August 2000	UNP	UNP		PA	Chief Opposition Whip (94-98).
Mohamed, Farook Yoonus Lebbe	KEG	47,765	25 August 1994	18 August 2000	UNP	UNP	UNP	UNP	
Mohamed, M. H.	COL	44,527	25 August 1994	18 August 2000	UNP	UNP	UNP	UNP	
Mohideen, U. L. M.	AMP	26,194	25 August 1994	18 August 2000	SLMC		SLMC	PA	
Moonesinghe, Anil	KAL	56,071	25 August 1994	18 August 2000	SLFP	PA	SLFP	PA	Deputy Speaker & Chairman of Committees (94-00).
Moonesinghe, Susil	COL	61,610	25 August 1994	18 August 2000	UNP	UNP	UNP	UNP	
Moulana, Seyed Ali Zahir	BAT	11,508	25 August 1994	18 August 2000	UNP	UNP	UNP	UNP	
Najeeb, Abdul Majeed Mohamed	TRI	21,590	25 August 1994	18 August 2000	SLMC		SLMC	PA	
Nalanda, Ellawala	RAT	52,371	25 August 1994	11 February 1997	SLFP	PA	SLFP	PA	Murdered.
Nanayakkara, Vasudeva	RAT	62,989	25 August 1994	18 August 2000	LSSP	PA	LDA		
Nawinne, S. B.	KUR	122,611	25 August 1994	18 August 2000	SLFP	PA	SLFP	PA	
Nelson, H. G. P.	POL	39,439	25 August 1994	18 August 2000	UNP	UNP	UNP	UNP	
Padmasiri, K. H. G. N.	GAL	52,370	25 August 1994	18 August 2000	SLFP	PA	SLFP	PA	
Pararajasingham, Joseph	BAT	43,350	25 August 1994	18 August 2000	TULF		TULF		
Pathirana, Richard	GAL	116,893	25 August 1994	18 August 2000	SLFP	PA	SLFP	PA	Chief Government Whip (94-00).
Perera, A. A. R.	GAM	73,508	25 August 1994	18 August 2000	UNP	UNP	UNP	UNP	
Perera, Dilan	BAD	54,150	25 August 1994	18 August 2000	SLFP	PA	SLFP	PA	
Perera, Dixon J.	COL		6 January 1998	18 August 2000	SLFP	PA	UNP	UNP	Replaces Bernard Soysa.
Perera, Felix	GAM	80,539	25 August 1994	18 August 2000	SLFP	PA	SLFP	PA	
Perera, Festus	PUT	75,417	25 August 1994	18 August 2000	UNP	UNP	UNP	UNP	
Perera, Gamini Jayawickrama	KUR	109,900	25 August 1994	18 August 2000	UNP	UNP	UNP	UNP	
Perera, Joseph Michael	GAM	93,884	25 August 1994	18 August 2000	UNP	UNP	UNP	UNP	
Perera, Kasadoruge Vincent	KEG	45,884	25 August 1994	18 August 2000	UNP	UNP	UNP	UNP	
Podinilame, Jayathilaka	KEG	67,190	25 August 1994	18 August 2000	UNP	UNP	UNP	UNP	
Premachandra, A. M. Munidasa	KUR	58,293	25 August 1994	18 August 2000	SLFP	PA	SLFP	PA	
Premachandra, Bharatha Lazman	COL	63,421	25 August 1994	18 August 2000	SLFP	PA	SLFP	PA	
Premaratne, D. S. S.	ANU	43,167	25 August 1994	18 August 2000	SLFP	PA	SLFP	PA	
Premaratne, Ediriweera	KAL	70,041	25 August 1994	18 August 2000	SLFP	PA	SLFP	PA	
Premaratne, Gunasekara	COL	40,646	25 August 1994	18 August 2000	UNP	UNP	UNP	UNP	
Priyanganie, Abeyweera Sumithra	KAL	85,661	25 August 1994	18 August 2000	SLFP	PA	SLFP	PA	
Pulendran, Rasa Manohari	VAN	2,217	25 August 1994	18 August 2000	UNP	UNP	UNP	UNP	
Punchinilame, Susantha	RAT	57,029	25 August 1994	18 August 2000	UNP	UNP	UNP	UNP	
Pushpakumara, Jagath	MON	34,663	25 August 1994	18 August 2000	SLFP	PA	SLFP	PA	
Rajakaruna, R. M. Jayasena	KUR	47,073	25 August 1994	18 August 2000	SLFP	PA	SLFP	PA	
Rajakaruna, Sarath Chandra	GAM	59,992	25 August 1994	18 August 2000	UNP	UNP	UNP	UNP	
Rajan, A. M. D.	NAT		25 August 1994	18 August 2000	CWC	UNP	CWC	PA	
Rajapaksa, Chamal	HAM	63,698	25 August 1994	18 August 2000	SLFP	PA	SLFP	PA	
Rajapaksa, Mahinda	HAM	78,977	25 August 1994	18 August 2000	SLFP	PA	SLFP	PA	
Rajapaksa, Nirupama	HAM	46,034	25 August 1994	18 August 2000	SLFP	PA	SLFP	PA	
Rajapaksha, Suranimala	GAM	63,067	25 August 1994	18 August 2000	UNP	UNP	UNP	UNP	
Ramamoorthy, Rajendran	JAF	1,050	25 August 1994	18 August 2000	EPDP	IND	EPDP	PA	
Ranatunga, Reggie	GAM	61,458	25 August 1994	18 August 2000	SLFP	PA	SLFP	PA	
Ranawaka, J. S. K.	KAL	60,506	25 August 1994	18 August 2000	UNP	UNP	UNP	UNP	
Ranaweera, Jayatissa	RAT	48,450	25 August 1994	18 August 2000	SLFP	PA	SLFP	PA	
Ranaweera, V. S. S.	TRI	15,084	25 August 1994	18 August 2000	UNP	UNP	UNP	UNP	
Rasamanickam, Alagaiah	JAF	1,110	25 August 1994	18 August 2000	EPDP	IND	EPDP	PA	
Rathnayake, C. B.	NUW	38,092	25 August 1994	18 August 2000	SLFP	PA	SLFP	PA	
Rathnayake, R. M.	BAD	40,293	25 August 1994	18 August 2000	UNP	UNP	UNP	UNP	
Ratnayake, Amara Piyaseeli	KUR	53,421	25 August 1994	18 August 2000	UNP	UNP	UNP	UNP	
Ratnayake, Hema	BAD	40,873	25 August 1994	18 August 2000	SLFP	PA	SLFP	PA	
Ratwatte, Anuruddha	KAN	92,644	25 August 1994	18 August 2000	SLFP	PA	SLFP	PA	
Robert, Jayaratne Silva Dedimuni	PUT	49,116	25 August 1994	18 August 2000	SLFP	PA	SLFP	PA	
Rupasinghe, Neil	GAM	57,090	25 August 1994	18 August 2000	SLFP	PA	SLFP	PA	
Samarasinghe, Eugin Alwis	MTR	57,455	25 August 1994	18 August 2000	SLFP	PA	SLFP	PA	
Samarasinghe, Mahinda	KAL	59,150	25 August 1994	18 August 2000	UNP	UNP	UNP	UNP	
Samaraweera, Mangala	MTR	61,574	25 August 1994	18 August 2000	SLFP	PA	SLFP	PA	
Samaraweera, Ravindra	BAD	42,309	25 August 1994	18 August 2000	UNP	UNP	UNP	UNP	
Sathasiwam, Suppiah	NUW	83,368	25 August 1994	18 August 2000	CWC	UNP	CWC	PA	
Selvarasa, Pon	BAT	17,450	25 August 1994	18 August 2000	TULF		TULF		
Semasinghe, H. B.	ANU	45,256	25 August 1994	18 August 2000	SLFP	PA	SLFP	PA	
Senalankadikara, Amal	COL	54,321	25 August 1994	18 August 2000	SLFP	PA	SLFP	PA	
Senanayake, Rukman	POL	45,648	25 August 1994	18 August 2000	UNP	UNP	UNP	UNP	
Senathirajah, Mavai	NAT			18 August 2000	TULF		TULF		Replaces Neelan Tiruchelvam.
Senewiratne, Athauda	KEG	50,775	25 August 1994	18 August 2000	LSSP	PA	SLFP	PA	
Senewiratne, John	RAT	44,704	25 August 1994	18 August 2000	SLFP	PA	SLFP	PA	
Senewiratne, Lakshman	BAD	41,320	25 August 1994	18 August 2000	UNP	UNP	UNP	UNP	
Shanmuganathan, S.	VAN	5,828	25 August 1994	15 July 1998	PLOTE	DPLF	PLOTE	DPLF	Murdered.
Silva, Mervyn	HAM	36,338	25 August 1994	18 August 2000	UNP	UNP	UNP	UNP	
Sirisena, Maithripala	POL	62,925	25 August 1994	18 August 2000	SLFP	PA	SLFP	PA	
Sirisena, R. A. D.	KEG	50,690	25 August 1994	18 August 2000	UNP	UNP	UNP	UNP	
Siththarthan, Tharmalingam	VAN	6,376	25 August 1994	18 August 2000	PLOTE	DPLF	PLOTE	DPLF	
Sivalingam, Muthu	NUW	85,490	25 August 1994	18 August 2000	CWC	UNP	CWC	PA	
Sivasamy, Rajarathnan	KAN	38,343	25 August 1994	18 August 2000	CWC	UNP	CWC	PA	
Sivathasan, Sangarapillai	JAF	456	25 August 1994	18 August 2000	EPDP	IND	EPDP	PA	
Soysa, Bernard	COL	50,872	25 August 1994	30 December 1997	LSSP	PA	LSSP	PA	Died. Replaced by Dixon J. Perera.
Sumathipala, Premaratnage	VAN	2,975	25 August 1994	18 August 2000	SLFP	PA	SLFP	PA	
Suraweera, Alankarage Victor	GAM	50,740	25 August 1994	18 August 2000	SLFP	PA	SLFP	PA	
Tennakoon, Janaka Bandara	MTL	52,437	25 August 1994	18 August 2000	SLFP	PA	SLFP	PA	
Thangathurai, A.	TRI	22,409	25 August 1994	5 July 1997	TULF		TULF		Murdered.
Thangavel, Sinniah	JAF	398	25 August 1994	18 August 2000	EPDP	IND	EPDP	PA	
Thondaman, Arumugan	NUW	75,297	25 August 1994	18 August 2000	CWC	UNP	CWC	PA	
Thondaman, Savumiamoorthy	NAT		25 August 1994	30 October 1999	CWC	UNP	CWC	PA	Died.
Thurairasasingham, Krishnapillai	BAT	15,974	25 August 1994	18 August 2000	TULF		TULF		
Tiruchelvam, Neelan	NAT		25 August 1994	29 July 1999	TULF		TULF		Murdered. Replaced by Mavai Senathirajah.
Tissa, A. D. R.	NUW	40,513	25 August 1994	18 August 2000	UNP	UNP	UNP	UNP	
Upali, A. M. P.	KUR	54,881	25 August 1994	18 August 2000	UNP	UNP	UNP	UNP	
Veera, Sennan	BAD	41,683	25 August 1994	18 August 2000	CWC	UNP	CWC	PA	
Vipulaguna, J. P. V.	HAM	15,309	25 August 1994		JVP	SLPF	JVP	SLPF	Resigned. Replaced by Nihal Galappaththi.
Wadigamangawa, Asoka	PUT	47,003	25 August 1994	18 August 2000	UNP	UNP	UNP	UNP	
Wanniarachchi, Pavithra Devi	RAT	62,979	25 August 1994	18 August 2000	SLFP	PA	SLFP	PA	
Weerasinghe, H. M.	AMP	36,276	25 August 1994	18 August 2000	SLFP	PA	SLFP	PA	
Weerawanni, Samaraweera	BAD	44,595	25 August 1994	18 August 2000	SLFP	PA	SLFP	PA	
Weerawardhana, Ediriweera	KAN	53,192	25 August 1994	18 August 2000	SLFP	PA	SLFP	PA	
Welgama, Kumara	KAL	79,056	25 August 1994	18 August 2000	SLFP	PA	SLFP	PA	
Wickramarathne, Kingsly Tissa	COL	95,077	25 August 1994	18 August 2000	SLFP	PA	SLFP	PA	
Wickremanayake, Ratnasiri	KAL	88,213	25 August 1994	18 August 2000	SLFP	PA	SLFP	PA	Leader of the House (94-00). Prime Minister (00).
Wickremasinghe, D. P.	KUR	49,383	25 August 1994	18 August 2000	SLFP	PA	SLFP	PA	
Wickremasinghe, Ranil	COL	291,194	25 August 1994	18 August 2000	UNP	UNP	UNP	UNP	Leader of the Opposition (94-00).
Wijesekara, Mahinda	MTR	65,769	25 August 1994	18 August 2000	SLFP	PA	SLFP	PA	
Wijeyeratne, Mano	KEG	51,531	25 August 1994	18 August 2000	UNP	UNP	UNP	UNP	
Wimalasiri, H. R.	MTR	33,078	25 August 1994	18 August 2000	UNP	UNP	UNP	UNP	
Yapa, Anura Priyadharshana	KUR	57,127	25 August 1994	18 August 2000	SLFP	PA	SLFP	PA	
Yogarajan, Ramaiah	COL			18 August 2000	CWC	UNP	CWC	PA	
Zafarullah, M. A. Ghafoor	JAF	351	25 August 1994	18 August 2000	EPDP	IND	EPDP	PA	
?	NAT		25 August 1994	18 August 2000		PA		PA	
?	NAT		25 August 1994	18 August 2000		PA		PA	
?	NAT		25 August 1994	18 August 2000		PA		PA	
?	NAT		25 August 1994	18 August 2000		PA		PA	
?	NAT		25 August 1994	18 August 2000		PA		PA	
?	NAT		25 August 1994	18 August 2000		PA		PA	
?	NAT		25 August 1994	18 August 2000		PA		PA	
?	NAT		25 August 1994	18 August 2000		PA		PA	
?	NAT		25 August 1994	18 August 2000		PA		PA	
?	NAT		25 August 1994	18 August 2000		PA		PA	
?	NAT		25 August 1994	18 August 2000		PA		PA	
?	NAT		25 August 1994	18 August 2000		UNP		UNP	
?	NAT		25 August 1994	18 August 2000		UNP		UNP	
?	NAT		25 August 1994	18 August 2000		UNP		UNP	
?	NAT		25 August 1994	18 August 2000		UNP		UNP	
?	NAT		25 August 1994	18 August 2000		UNP		UNP	
?	NAT		25 August 1994	18 August 2000		UNP		UNP	
?	NAT		25 August 1994	18 August 2000		UNP		UNP	
?	NAT		25 August 1994	18 August 2000		UNP		UNP	
?	NAT		25 August 1994	18 August 2000		UNP		UNP	
?	NAT		25 August 1994	18 August 2000		UNP		UNP	
