= R. Yogarajan =

Sri Lankan politician

Hon. R. Yogarajan

Member of Parliament for Colombo District
- In office 1994–2000

Member of Parliament for National List
- In office 2001–2004
- Preceded by: K. Marimuttu
- In office 2010–2015

Member of the Western Provincial Council
- In office 1993–1994

Personal details
- Born: 13 June 1950 (age 75)
- Party: United National Party
- Other political affiliations: United National Front for Good Governance
- Occupation: Engineer

Ramaiah Yogarajan (born 13 June 1950) is a Sri Lankan engineer, politician, and former Member of Parliament.

== Early life ==
Yogarajan was born on 13 June 1950.

== Career ==
Yogarajan was a member of the Western Provincial Council from 1993 to 1994. He contested the 1994 parliamentary election as one of the United National Party (UNP)'s candidates in Colombo District but failed to get elected. However, he entered Parliament following the assassination of Ossie Abeygunasekera and Weerasinghe Mallimarachchi in October 1994. He contested the 2000 parliamentary election as one of the UNP's candidates in Colombo District but again failed to get elected. However, in July 2001 People's Alliance National List MP K. Marimuttu resigned to take up a diplomatic position and Yogarajan replaced him in Parliament.

Yogarajan contested the 2001 parliamentary election as one of the United National Front (UNF)'s candidates in Colombo District but again failed to get elected. However, after the election he was appointed National List MP by the UNF. He contested the 2004 parliamentary election as one of the UNF's candidates in Colombo District but failed to get elected after coming twelfth amongst the UNF candidates.

Yogarajan, who was the Ceylon Workers' Congress' national organizer, resigned from the party on 30 December 2009 to support common opposition candidate Sarath Fonseka at the presidential election and joined the UNP. After the 2010 parliamentary election he was appointed National List MP by the UNF.

Yogarajan was one of the United National Front for Good Governance's candidates in Nuwara Eliya District at the 2015 parliamentary election but failed to get re-elected after coming 11th amongst the UNFGG candidates.

== Electoral history ==
Electoral history of R. Yogarajan
Election	Constituency	Party	Votes	Result
1993 provincial				Elected
1994 parliamentary	Colombo District	UNP		Not elected
2000 parliamentary	Colombo District	UNP		Not elected
2001 parliamentary	Colombo District	UNF		Not elected
2004 parliamentary	Colombo District	UNF	39,321	Not elected
2015 parliamentary	Nuwara Eliya District	UNFGG	17,225	Not elected
