= Akila Viraj Kariyawasam =

Sri Lankan politician

Hon. Akila Viraj Kariyawasam MP
- අකිල විරාජ් කාරියවසම් அகில விராஜ் காரியவசம்ஷ

Minister of Education
- In office 13 January 2015 – 21 November 2019
- President: Maithripala Sirisena
- Prime Minister: Ranil Wickremesinghe
- Preceded by: Bandula Gunawardane
- Succeeded by: Dullas Alahapperuma

Member of Parliament for Kurunegala District
- In office 2004–2020

Personal details
- Born: 23 May 1973 (age 53)
- Party: United National Party
- Education: University of Colombo; Open University of Sri Lanka
- Profession: Lawyer

Akila Viraj Kariyawasam (Sinhala: අකිල විරාජ් කාරියවසම්, Tamil: அகில விராஜ் காரியவசம்; also spelled Akila Wiraj Kariyawasam; born 23 May 1973) is a Sri Lankan politician and lawyer who served as minister of education from 2015 to 2019.

Representing Kurunegala, Kariyawasam served as a member of the Parliament of Sri Lanka from 2004 to 2020. He now serves as president of the trade union Jathika Sevaka Sangamaya and remains affiliated with the United National Party.

== Personal life ==
Kariyawasam is the fifth of six children. His father is William Godage Kariyawasam, a former registrar at Wayamba University of Sri Lanka and local businessman. His mother is Mrs. Allen Kariyawasam.

As an undergraduate, Kariyawasam studied economics, political science and international relations at the University of Colombo. He later pursued a law degree at the Open University of Sri Lanka.

== Career ==
Prior to serving on Parliament, Kariyawasam held leadership positions with National Youth Front, the youth wing of the United National Party. He served as the organization's chairman for the Kuliyapitiya Electoral District from 1995 to 1996 and chairman for the Kurunegala District from 1996 to 1999. In 1999, Kariyawasam was appointed general secretary for the organization's national operations.

Kariyawasam served as a political organizer for the Panduwasnuwara Polling Division from 2003 to 2005, and for the Kuliyapitiya Polling Division beginning in 2005.

Kariyawasam was elected to Parliament in 2004 representing Kurunegala as a UNP candidate. His party secured seven of 16 Parliament seats available in Kurunegala that year, with UNP candidates receiving 42.94% of all votes cast in the district.

In the 2015 parliamentary election, Kariyawasam received the most votes out of any UNP candidate in the Kurunegala District, with 286,165 votes. He received the second-most votes among all candidates for the district across parties, only outplaced by former president and United People's Freedom Alliance candidate Mahinda Rajapaksa.

In 2015, Kariyawasam was appointed minister of education while still serving on Parliament. He held the position until 2019, and his tenure in Parliament ended in 2020.

Kariyawasam went on to serve as president of the Jathika Sevaka Sangamaya, a trade union affiliated with the UNP.

== Controversy ==
On 5 August 2026, Kariyawasam was arrested by the Commission to Investigate Allegations of Bribery or Corruption (CIABOC) on corruption charges and was remanded until 18 August by the Colombo Chief Magistrate's Court.

== Sources ==
- "AKILA WIRAJ KARIYAWASAM". Directory of Members. Parliament of Sri Lanka. Archived from the original on 13 October 2010.
