= Wijetunga cabinet =

Central government of Sri Lanka (1993-94)

- 12th Cabinet of Sri Lanka
- Date formed: 1 May 1993
- Date dissolved: 12 November 1994

People and organisations
- Head of state: D. B. Wijetunga
- Head of government: D. B. Wijetunga
- Deputy head of government: Ranil Wickremesinghe (1993–94); Chandrika Kumaratunga (1994)
- No. of ministers: 5
- Total no. of members: 5
- Member party: United National Party (1993–94); People's Alliance (1994)
- Status in legislature: Majority government (1993-94); Majority coalition (1994)
- Opposition party: Sri Lanka Freedom Party (1993–94); United National Party (1994)
- Opposition leader: Sirimavo Bandaranaike (1993–94); Gamini Dissanayake (1994); Ranil Wickremesinghe (1994)

History
- Election: 1994 parliamentary
- Outgoing election: 1994 presidential
- Legislature terms: 9th, 10th
- Predecessor: Premadasa
- Successor: Kumaratunga

The Wijetunga cabinet was the central government of Sri Lanka led by President D. B. Wijetunga between 1993 and 1994. It was formed in May 1993 after the assassination of Wijetunga's predecessor Ranasinghe Premadasa and it ended in November 1994 when Wijetunga chose not to contest in the 1994 presidential election. The Wijetunga cabinet saw Sri Lanka's first cohabitation government following the opposition People's Alliance's victory in the 1994 general election.

== Cabinet members ==
=== UNP government (1993–1994) ===
Name	Portrait	Party	Office	Took office	Left office	Refs
D. B. Wijetunga		United National Party	President	7 May 1993 (Note: Wijetunga was acting president from 1 May 1993 to 7 May 1993.)	12 November 1994	
D. B. Wijetunga		United National Party	Minister of Finance	(Note: Continuation of same office held in previous cabinet.)	31 August 1994	
D. B. Wijetunga		United National Party	Minister of Buddhist Affairs			
D. B. Wijetunga		United National Party	Minister of Defence	7 May 1993	12 November 1994	
Ranil Wickremesinghe		United National Party	Prime Minister	7 May 1993	19 August 1994	
A. C. S. Hameed		United National Party	Minister of Justice		August 1993	
A. C. S. Hameed		United National Party	Minister of Foreign Affairs	August 1993		
Harold Herath		United National Party	Minister of Foreign Affairs		August 1993	
Harold Herath		United National Party	Minister of Justice	August 1993		
W. J. M. Lokubandara		United National Party	Minister of Cultural Affairs and Information		August 1993	
W. J. M. Lokubandara		United National Party	Minister of Education and Higher Education	August 1993		

=== SLFP government (1994) ===
Name	Portrait	Party	Office	Took office	Left office	Refs
Chandrika Kumaratunga		Sri Lanka Freedom Party	Prime Minister	19 August 1994	12 November 1994	
Chandrika Kumaratunga		Sri Lanka Freedom Party	Minister of Ethnic Affairs and National Integration	19 August 1994		
Chandrika Kumaratunga		Sri Lanka Freedom Party	Minister of Finance and Planning	19 August 1994	(Note: Continued to hold same office in next cabinet.)	
M. H. M. Ashraff		Sri Lanka Muslim Congress	Minister of Shipping, Ports and Rehabilitation	19 August 1994		
Srimanee Athulathmudali		Democratic United National Front	Minister of Transport, Highways, Environment and Women's Affairs	19 August 1994		
Sirimavo Bandaranaike		Sri Lanka Freedom Party	Minister Without Portfolio	19 August 1994		
Nimal Siripala de Silva		Sri Lanka Freedom Party	Minister of Housing, Construction and Public Utilities	19 August 1994		
S. B. Dissanayake		Sri Lanka Freedom Party	Minister of Youth, Sport and Rural Development	19 August 1994		
Amarasiri Dodangoda		Sri Lanka Freedom Party	Minister of Home Affairs, Local Government and Co-operatives	19 August 1994		
A. H. M. Fowzie		Sri Lanka Freedom Party	Minister of Health and Social Services	19 August 1994		
C. V. Gunaratne		Sri Lanka Freedom Party	Minister of Industrial Development	19 August 1994		
Indika Gunawardena		Sri Lanka Freedom Party	Minister of Fisheries and Aquatic Resources	19 August 1994		
Lakshman Jayakody		Sri Lanka Freedom Party	Minister of Cultural and Religious Affairs	19 August 1994		
D. M. Jayaratne		Sri Lanka Freedom Party	Minister of Agriculture, Land and Forestry Conservation	19 August 1994		
Lakshman Kadirgamar		Sri Lanka Freedom Party	Minister of Foreign Affairs	19 August 1994		
Richard Pathirana		Sri Lanka Freedom Party	Minister of Education and Higher Education	19 August 1994		
G. L. Peiris		Sri Lanka Freedom Party	Minister of Justice and Constitutional Affairs	19 August 1994		
Mahinda Rajapaksa		Sri Lanka Freedom Party	Minister of Labour and Vocational Training	19 August 1994		
Anuruddha Ratwatte		Sri Lanka Freedom Party	Minister of Irrigation, Power and Energy	19 August 1994		
Mangala Samaraweera		Sri Lanka Freedom Party	Minister of Posts and Telecommunications	19 August 1994		
Dharmasiri Senanayake		Sri Lanka Freedom Party	Minister of Information, Tourism and Aviation	19 August 1994		
Bernard Soysa		Lanka Sama Samaja Party	Minister of Science Development and Human Resources Development	19 August 1994		
Ratnasiri Wickremanayake		Sri Lanka Freedom Party	Minister of Public Administration and Plantation Affairs	19 August 1994		
Kingsley Wickramasinghe		Sri Lanka Freedom Party	Minister of Trade, Commerce and Food	19 August 1994		
