= P. P. Devaraj =

Sri Lankan politician

Hon. P. P. Devaraj

Member of Parliament for National List
- In office 1989–1994

Member of Parliament for Colombo District
- In office 1994–2000

Personal details
- Born: 21 February 1929 (age 97)
- Party: Ceylon Workers' Congress
- Other political affiliations: United People's Freedom Alliance
- Ethnicity: Indian Tamil

Periannan Pillai Devaraj (born 21 February 1929) is a Sri Lankan politician and former minister of state.

== Early life ==
Devaraj was born on 21 February 1929. He was educated at St. Sylvester's College, Kandy. He has a B.Sc. degree in economics.

== Career ==
Devaraj was director of the Congress Labour Foundation, part of the Ceylon Workers' Congress (CWC) and was an advisor to CWC leader Savumiamoorthy Thondaman. He was later vice president of the CWC.

Devaraj was appointed as one of the CWC/UNP alliance's National List MP in the Sri Lankan Parliament following the 1989 parliamentary election. He was appointed Minister of State for Hindu Religious and Cultural Affairs on 18 February 1989. He contested the 1994 parliamentary election as one of the CWC/UNP alliance's candidates in Colombo District but failed to get elected. However, he re-entered Parliament following the assassination of Ossie Abeygunasekera and Weerasinghe Mallimarachchi on 24 October 1994. Following the death of Thondaman in 1999 Devaraj tried unsuccessful to gain the leadership of the CWC from Thondaman's grandson Arumugam Thondaman.

Devaraj was elected chairman of the Global Organization for People of Indian Origin (GOPIO) in 2007.
