= Minister of Education (Sri Lanka) =

Sri Lankan cabinet minister

Minister of Education, Higher Education and Vocational Education of Sri Lanka
- අධ්‍යාපන, උසස් අධ්‍යාපන සහ වෘත්තීය අධ්‍යාපන අමාත්‍ය கல்வி, உயர்கல்வி மற்றும் தொழிற்கல்வி அமைச்சர்
- Emblem of Sri Lanka

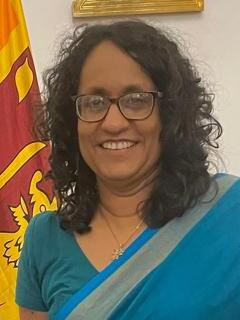
- Incumbent; Harini Amarasuriya since 24 September 2024
- Ministry of Education, Higher Education and Vocational Education
- Appointer: The president on advice of the prime minister
- Inaugural holder: C. W. W. Kannangara (as Chairman of Executive Committee on Education); E. A. Nugawela (as Minister of Education)
- Formation: September 26, 1947; 78 years ago
- Website: Ministry of Education

The minister of education, higher education and vocational education (Sinhala: අධ්‍යාපන, උසස් අධ්‍යාපන සහ වෘත්තීය අධ්‍යාපන අමාත්‍ය; Tamil: கல்வி, உயர்கல்வி மற்றும் தொழிற்கல்வி அமைச்சர்) is an appointment in the Cabinet of Sri Lanka.

== Cabinet ministers ==
Parties

Independent United National Party Sri Lanka Freedom Party Sri Lanka Podujana Peramuna Mahajana Eksath Peramuna National People's Power

No.	Portrait	Minister (Birth-Death) Constituency	Term of office			Political party	Ministry	Head of government
No.	Portrait	Minister (Birth-Death) Constituency	From	To	Period	Political party	Ministry	Head of government
Chairman of the Executive Committee on Education
–		C. W. W. Kannangara සී.ඩබ්ලිව්.ඩබ්ලිව්.කන්නන්ගර (1884–1969); Galle	7 July 1931	24 September 1947	16 years, 79 days	Independent	1st Board of Ministers; 2nd Board of Ministers	D. B. Jayatilaka; D. S. Senanayake
Minister of Education
1		Major; E. A. Nugawela ED ඊ.ඒ.නුගවෙල (1898–1972); Kadugannawa	24 September 1947	22 March 1952	4 years, 269 days	United National Party	D. S. Senanayake	D. S. Senanayake
1		Major; E. A. Nugawela ED ඊ.ඒ.නුගවෙල (1898–1972); Kadugannawa	22 March 1952	19 June 1952	4 years, 269 days	United National Party	D. Senanayake I	Dudley Senanayake
2		M. D. Banda එම්.ඩී.බණ්ඩා (1914–1974); Maturata	19 June 1952	12 October 1953	3 years, 298 days	United National Party	D. Senanayake I	Dudley Senanayake
2		M. D. Banda එම්.ඩී.බණ්ඩා (1914–1974); Maturata	12 October 1953	12 April 1956	3 years, 298 days	United National Party	Kotelawala	Sir John Kotelawala
3		Wijeyananda Dahanayake විජයානන්ද දහනායක (1902–1997); Galle	12 April 1956	26 September 1959	3 years, 343 days	Sri Lanka Freedom Party	S. W. R. D. Bandaranaike	S. W. R. D. Bandaranaike
3		Wijeyananda Dahanayake විජයානන්ද දහනායක (1902–1997); Galle	26 September 1959	20 March 1960	3 years, 343 days	Sri Lanka Freedom Party	Dahanayake	Self
Minister of Education and Cultural Affairs
4		Bernard Aluwihare බර්නාඩ් අලුවිහාරේ (1902–1961); Matale	21 March 1960	21 July 1960	122 days	United National Party	D. Senanayake II	Dudley Senanayake
Minister of Education and Broadcasting
5		Deshamanya; Badi-ud-din Mahmud බදි-උද්-දින් මහමුද් (1904–1997)	23 July 1960	28 May 1963	2 years, 309 days	Sri Lanka Freedom Party	S. Bandaranaike I	Sirimavo Bandaranaike
Minister of Education and Cultural Affairs
5		P. B. G. Kalugalla පී බී ජී කළුගල්ල (1920–2007); Kegalle	28 May 1963	25 March 1965	1 year, 301 days	Sri Lanka Freedom Party	S. Bandaranaike I	Sirimavo Bandaranaike
6		I. M. R. A. Iriyagolle අයි.එම්.ආර්.ඒ.ඊරියගොල්ලේ (1907–1973); Kuliyapitiya	25 March 1965	29 May 1970	5 years, 65 days	United National Party	D. Senanayake III	Dudley Senanayake
Minister of Education
(5)		Deshamanya; Badi-ud-din Mahmud බදි-උද්-දින් මහමුද් (1904–1997); Appointed MP	29 May 1970	23 July 1977	7 years, 55 days	Sri Lanka Freedom Party	S. Bandaranaike II	Sirimavo Bandaranaike
7		Deshamanya; Nissanka Wijeyeratne නිශ්ශංක පරාක්‍රම විජයරත්න (1924–2007); Dedigama	23 July 1977	14 February 1980	2 years, 206 days	United National Party	Jayewardene	J. R. Jayewardene
8		Ranil Wickremesinghe රනිල් වික්‍රමසිංහ (born 1949); Biyagama	14 February 1980	2 January 1989	9 years, 0 days	United National Party	Jayewardene	J. R. Jayewardene
8		Ranil Wickremesinghe රනිල් වික්‍රමසිංහ (born 1949); Biyagama	2 January 1989	14 February 1989	9 years, 0 days	United National Party	Premadasa	Ranasinghe Premadasa
Minister of Education, Cultural Affairs and Information
9		W. J. M. Lokubandara වි. ජ. මු. ලොකුබණ්ඩාර (1941–2021); Badulla	18 February 1989	28 March 1990	1 year, 38 days	United National Party	Premadasa	Ranasinghe Premadasa
Minister of Education and Higher Education
10		Lalith Athulathmudali ලලිත් ඇතුලත්මුදලි (1936–1993); Colombo	30 March 1990	30 August 1991	1 year, 153 days	United National Party	Premadasa	Ranasinghe Premadasa
(9)		W. J. M. Lokubandara වි. ජ. මු. ලොකුබණ්ඩාර (1941–2021); Badulla	12 August 1993	15 August 1994	1 year, 3 days	United National Party	Wijetunga I	Dingiri Banda Wijetunga
11		Richard Pathirana රිචඩ් පතිරණ (1938–2008); Galle	19 August 1994	12 November 1994	6 years, 61 days	Sri Lanka Freedom Party	Wijetunga II	Dingiri Banda Wijetunga
11		Richard Pathirana රිචඩ් පතිරණ (1938–2008); Galle	12 November 1994	19 October 2000	6 years, 61 days	Sri Lanka Freedom Party	Kumaratunga I	Chandrika Kumaratunga
Minister of Education
12		Susil Premajayantha සුසිල් ප්‍රේමජයන්ත (born 1955); Colombo	19 October 2000	14 September 2001	330 days	Sri Lanka Freedom Party	Kumaratunga II	Chandrika Kumaratunga
Minister of Education and Higher Education
13		Sarath Amunugama සරත් ලීලානන්ද බණඩාර අමුනුගම (born 1939); Kandy	14 September 2001	10 October 2001	26 days	Sri Lanka Freedom Party	Kumaratunga II	Chandrika Kumaratunga
Minister of Human Resources, Education and Culture
14		Karunasena Kodituwakku කරුණාසේන කොඩිතුවක්කු (born 1945); Colombo	12 December 2001	7 February 2004	2 years, 57 days	United National Party	Kumaratunga III	Chandrika Kumaratunga
Minister of Education
15		Chandrika Kumaratunga චන්ද්‍රිකා බණ්ඩාරනායක (born 1945)	10 April 2004	19 November 2005	1 year, 223 days	Sri Lanka Freedom Party	Kumaratunga IV	Self
(12)		Susil Premajayantha සුසිල් ප්‍රේමජයන්ත (born 1955); Colombo	23 November 2005	23 April 2010	4 years, 151 days	Sri Lanka Freedom Party	M. Rajapaksa	Mahinda Rajapaksa
16		Bandula Gunawardane බන්දුල ගුණවර්ධන (born 1953); Colombo	23 April 2010	12 January 2015	4 years, 264 days	Sri Lanka Freedom Party	M. Rajapaksa	Mahinda Rajapaksa
17		Akila Viraj Kariyawasam අකිල විරාජ් කාරියවසම් (born 1973); Kurunegala	12 January 2015	26 October 2018	3 years, 287 days	United National Party	Sirisena I	Maithripala Sirisena
17		Akila Viraj Kariyawasam අකිල විරාජ් කාරියවසම් (born 1973); Kurunegala	12 January 2015	26 October 2018	3 years, 287 days	United National Party	Sirisena II	Maithripala Sirisena
Minister of Education and Higher Education
18		Wijeyadasa Rajapakshe විජයදාස රාජපක්ෂ (born 1959); Colombo	29 October 2018	15 December 2018	47 days	United National Party	Sirisena III	Maithripala Sirisena
Minister of Education
(17)		Akila Viraj Kariyawasam අකිල විරාජ් කාරියවසම් (born 1973); Kurunegala	20 December 2018	21 November 2019	336 days	United National Party	Sirisena IV	Maithripala Sirisena
18		Dullas Alahapperuma ඩලස් අලහප්පෙරුම (born 1959); Matara	22 November 2019	12 August 2020	264 days	Sri Lanka Podujana Peramuna	G. Rajapaksa I	Gotabaya Rajapaksa
19		G. L. Peiris ගාමිණී ලක්ශ්මන් පීරිස් (born 1946); National List	12 August 2020	16 August 2021	1 year, 4 days	Sri Lanka Podujana Peramuna	G. Rajapaksa II	Gotabaya Rajapaksa
20		Dinesh Gunawardena දිනේෂ් ගුණවර්ධන (born 1949); Colombo	16 August 2021	18 April 2022	245 days	Mahajana Eksath Peramuna	G. Rajapaksa II	Gotabaya Rajapaksa
21		Ramesh Pathirana රමේෂ් පතිරණ (born 1969); Galle	18 April 2022	9 May 2022	21 days	Sri Lanka Podujana Peramuna	G. Rajapaksa III	Gotabaya Rajapaksa
22		Susil Premajayantha සුසිල් ප්‍රේමජයන්ත (born 1955); Colombo	20 May 2022	23 September 2024	2 years, 126 days	Sri Lanka Podujana Peramuna	G. Rajapaksa IV	Gotabaya Rajapaksa
22		Susil Premajayantha සුසිල් ප්‍රේමජයන්ත (born 1955); Colombo	20 May 2022	23 September 2024	2 years, 126 days	Sri Lanka Podujana Peramuna	Wickremesinghe	Ranil Wickremesinghe
Minister of Education, Higher Education and Vocational Education
23		Harini Amarasuriya හරිනි අමරසූරිය (born 1970); Colombo	24 September 2024	Incumbent	1 year, 348 days	National People's Power	Dissanayake I	Anura Kumara Dissanayake
23		Harini Amarasuriya හරිනි අමරසූරිය (born 1970); Colombo	24 September 2024	Incumbent	1 year, 348 days	National People's Power	Dissanayake II	Anura Kumara Dissanayake

== See also ==
- Ministry of Education
