= Biyagama Electoral District =

Electoral district of Sri Lanka

Biyagama electoral district was an electoral district of Sri Lanka between July 1977 and February 1989. The district was named after the town of Biyagama in Gampaha District, Western Province. The 1978 Constitution of Sri Lanka introduced the proportional representation electoral system for electing members of Parliament. The existing 160 mainly single-member electoral districts were replaced with 22 multi-member electoral districts. Biyagama electoral district was replaced by the Gampaha multi-member electoral district at the 1989 general elections, the first under the proportional representation system.

== Members of Parliament ==
Key

Independent SLFP UNP

Election	Member	Party	Term
1977	Ranil Wickremasinghe	United National Party	1977-1989

== Elections ==
=== 1977 Parliamentary General Election ===
Results of the 8th parliamentary election held on 21 July 1977:

Candidate	Party	Symbol	Votes	%
Ranil Wickremasinghe	United National Party	Elephant	22,045	57.51
David Hapangama	Sri Lanka Freedom Party	Hand	15,276	39.85
Quintus Wickremanayake	Lanka Sama Samaja Party	Key	917	2.39
Siripala Hettiarachchi		Cartwheel	61	0.16
Vaithy Perumal		Ball	36	0.09
Valid Votes			38,260	99.80
Rejected Votes			76	0.20
Total Polled			38,336	100.00
Registered Electors			44,326	
Turnout				86.49
