= Ashoka Wadigamangawa =

Sri Lankan politician (1952–2020)

Hon. Ashoka Wadigamangawa

Member of Parliament for Puttalam
- In office 1989–1994

Personal details
- Born: A. H. M. Ashoka Premlal Wadigamangawa; 1 July 1952 Anamaduwa, Dominion of Ceylon
- Died: 5 July 2020 (aged 68) Wariyapola, Sri Lanka
- Party: Samagi Jana Balawegaya
- Other political affiliations: Sri Lanka Freedom Party; United People's Freedom Alliance; United National Party
- Occupation: politician

A. H. M. Ashoka Premlal Wadigamangawa also spelt as Asoka Wadigamangawa (Sinhala: අශෝක වඩිගමංගාව) (Tamil: அசோக வடிகமங்காவ) (7 January 1952 – 5 July 2020) was a Sri Lankan politician and parliamentarian. He represented the United National Party, Sri Lanka Freedom Party and United People's Freedom Alliance during his political career.

== Career ==
Ashoka first entered the Parliament of Sri Lanka in 1989 representing the UNP from the Puttalam District. He last entered the parliament in 1994 from the Puttalam District.

He left the UNP party and joined the United People's Freedom Alliance party and was appointed to the North Western Provincial Council by the then President Mahinda Rajapaksa. He then switched his support to Sri Lanka Freedom Party in the 2015 presidential election. In January 2018, he was appointed as the party organiser in the Puttalam District by the then president Maithripala Sirisena. He also contested as one of the independent candidates during the 2019 presidential election and received approximately 2924 votes during the election. Later he joined Samagi Jana Balawegaya which was founded in February 2020.

== Death ==
On 5 July 2020, Ashoka died in a road accident at Maragasgolla, Padeniya on the Kurunegala-Puttalam main road at the age of 68. He was admitted in a hospital in Wariyapola after succumbing to critical injuries. He was travelling in his car which collided with a lorry in Padeniya junction. He was supposed to contest for the Samagi Jana Balawegaya in the 2020 parliamentary election from Puttalam District.
