= Weerasinghe Mallimarachchi =

Sri Lankan politician (1929–1994)

Hon. Weerasinghe Mallimaratchi

Former Cabinet Minister of Food and Co-operative and Janasaviya-Poverty Alleviation ) He is the world's first cabinet minister of Poverty Alleviation )

Member of Parliament for Colombo District Kolonnawa
- In office 25 August 1977 – 24 October 1994
- Preceded by: T. B. Ilangaratne
- Succeeded by: Bennet Cooray
- Majority: 5300 votes

Personal details
- Born: 6 November 1929 Kandy Central province
- Died: 24 October 1994 (aged 64) Thotalanga, Grandpass, Sri Lanka
- Cause of death: Assassination
- Party: United National Party
- Spouse: Prema Mallimaratchi
- Children: 3
- Education: Ananda College & Dharmaraja College, Kandy
- Profession: Politician/Underworld godgodfather

Weerasinghe Mallimarachchi (6 November 1929 - 24 October 1994) was a Sri Lankan politician who served as mayor, congressman, and cabinet minister. He was in the United National Party government from 1990 until his assassination.

== Career ==
- Deputy Mayor Colombo 1970–1971
- Member Colombo Municipal Council 1962–1977
- Member of Parliament 1977–1994
- District Minister of Colombo 1978–1988
- Minister of Petroleum Services 1988–1989
- State Minister of Industries 1989–1990

== Death ==
His political life was cut short when he was assassinated by a female suicide bomber of the Liberation Tigers of Tamil Eelam (LTTE) while attending an election rally in support of Gamini Dissanayake, for the Presidential election of 1994.

== See also ==
- List of political families in Sri Lanka
- 1994 Sri Lankan parliamentary election
- List of members of the Sri Lankan Parliament who died in office
