= Second Sirisena cabinet =

Central government of Sri Lanka

- Cabinet of Sri Lanka

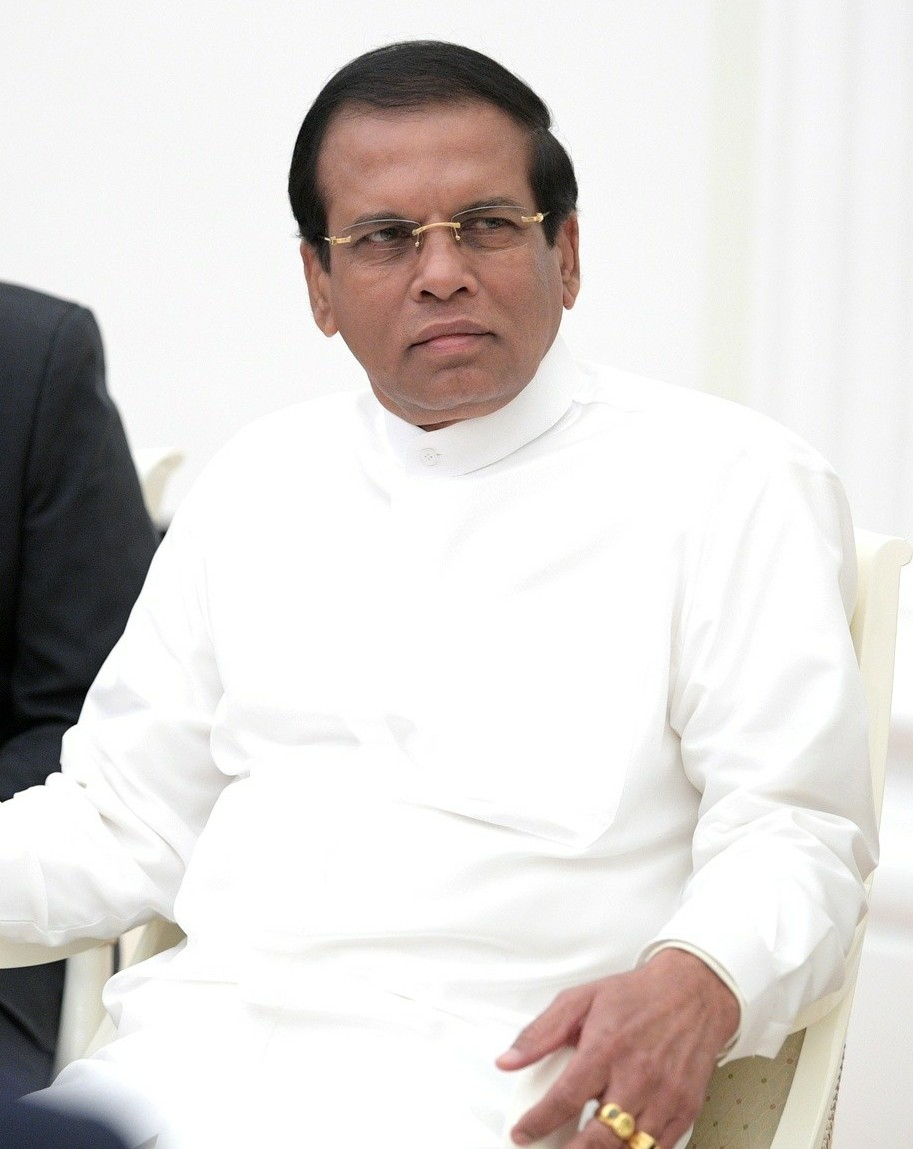
- Date formed: 24 August 2015
- Date dissolved: 26 October 2018

People and organisations
- Head of state: Maithripala Sirisena
- Head of government: Maithripala Sirisena
- Deputy head of government: Ranil Wickremesinghe
- Total no. of members: 116
- Member parties: United National Front for Good Governance; United People's Freedom Alliance
- Status in legislature: National unity government
- Opposition party: Tamil National Alliance
- Opposition leader: R. Sampanthan

History
- Election: 2015
- Legislature term: 15th
- Predecessor: Sirisena I
- Successor: Sirisena III

The second Sirisena cabinet was a central government of Sri Lanka led by President Maithripala Sirisena. It was formed in August 2015 after the parliamentary election and ended in October 2018 with the unconstitutional dismissal of Prime Minister Ranil Wickremesinghe, precipitating the 2018 constitutional crisis.

== Cabinet members ==
Ministers appointed under article 43(1) of the constitution.

Name	Portrait	Party	Office	Took office	Left office	^{Refs.}
Maithripala Sirisena		Sri Lanka Freedom Party	President	(Note: Continuation of same office held in previous cabinet.)	(Note: Continued to hold same office in next cabinet.)	
Maithripala Sirisena		Sri Lanka Freedom Party	Minister of Defence			
Maithripala Sirisena		Sri Lanka Freedom Party	Minister of Mahaweli Development and Environment			
Ranil Wickremesinghe		United National Party	Prime Minister		26 October 2018	
Ranil Wickremesinghe		United National Party	Minister of National Policies and Economic Affairs	4 September 2015	26 October 2018	
Ranil Wickremesinghe		United National Party	Minister of Law and Order	25 February 2018	8 March 2018	
Vajira Abeywardena		United National Party	Minister of Home Affairs	4 September 2015	26 October 2018	
John Amaratunga		United National Party	Minister of Tourism Development and Christian Religious Affairs	4 September 2015	26 October 2018	
John Amaratunga		United National Party	Minister of Lands	2 March 2016	26 October 2018	
Mahinda Amaraweera		Sri Lanka Freedom Party	Minister of Fisheries and Aquatic Resources Development		1 May 2018	
Mahinda Amaraweera		Sri Lanka Freedom Party	Minister of Agriculture	1 May 2018	26 October 2018	
Sarath Amunugama		Sri Lanka Freedom Party	Minister of Special Assignment	23 October 2015	1 May 2018	
Sarath Amunugama		Sri Lanka Freedom Party	Minister of Science, Technology and Research	12 April 2018	1 May 2018	
Sarath Amunugama		Sri Lanka Freedom Party	Minister of Skills Development and Vocational Training	12 April 2018	1 May 2018	
Sarath Amunugama		Sri Lanka Freedom Party	Minister of Science, Technology, Research, Skills Development, Vocational Training and Kandyan Heritage	1 May 2018	26 October 2018	
Thalatha Atukorale		United National Party	Minister of Foreign Employment		25 February 2018	
Thalatha Atukorale		United National Party	Minister of Justice	25 August 2017	1 May 2018	
Thalatha Atukorale		United National Party	Minister of Justice and Prison Reforms	1 May 2018	26 October 2018	
Risad Badhiutheen		All Ceylon Makkal Congress	Minister of Industry and Commerce		26 October 2018	
R. M. Ranjith Madduma Bandara		United National Party	Minister of Public Administration and Management	4 September 2015	1 May 2018	
R. M. Ranjith Madduma Bandara		United National Party	Minister of Law and Order	8 March 2018	1 May 2018	
R. M. Ranjith Madduma Bandara		United National Party	Minister of Public Administration, Management, Law and Order	1 May 2018	26 October 2018	
Nimal Siripala de Silva		Sri Lanka Freedom Party	Minister of Transport	4 September 2015	14 October 2015	
Nimal Siripala de Silva		Sri Lanka Freedom Party	Minister of Transport and Civil Aviation	14 October 2015	26 October 2018	
Palani Digambaran		National Union of Workers	Minister of Hill Country, New Villages, Infrastructure and Community Development	4 September 2015	26 October 2018	
Duminda Dissanayake		Sri Lanka Freedom Party	Minister of Agriculture		1 May 2018	
Duminda Dissanayake		Sri Lanka Freedom Party	Minister of Irrigation, Water Resources and Disaster Management	1 May 2018	26 October 2018	
Navin Dissanayake		United National Party	Minister of Plantation Industries	4 September 2015	26 October 2018	
S. B. Dissanayake		Sri Lanka Freedom Party	Minister of Social Empowerment and Welfare	4 September 2015	22 May 2017	
S. B. Dissanayake		Sri Lanka Freedom Party	Minister of Social Empowerment, Welfare and Kandyan Heritage	22 May 2017	12 April 2018	
Harin Fernando		United National Party	Minister of Telecommunication and Digital Infrastructure	4 September 2015	25 February 2018	
Harin Fernando		United National Party	Minister of Telecommunication, Digital Infrastructure and Foreign Employment	25 February 2018	26 October 2018	
Sarath Fonseka		Democratic Party	Minister of Regional Development	25 February 2016	30 June 2016	
Sarath Fonseka		United National Party	Minister of Regional Development	30 June 2016	1 May 2018	
Sarath Fonseka		United National Party	Minister of Sustainable Development, Wildlife and Regional Development	1 May 2018	26 October 2018	
Daya Gamage		United National Party	Minister of Primary Industries	4 September 2015	1 May 2018	
Daya Gamage		United National Party	Minister of Social Welfare and Primary Industries	1 May 2018	26 October 2018	
Mano Ganesan		Democratic People's Front	Minister of National Dialogue	4 September 2015	8 December 2015	
Mano Ganesan		Democratic People's Front	Minister of National Co-existence, Dialogue and Official Languages	8 December 2015	1 May 2018	
Mano Ganesan		Democratic People's Front	Minister of National Integration, Reconciliation and Official Languages	1 May 2018	26 October 2018	
M. K. D. S. Gunawardena^{✝}		Democratic National Movement	Minister of Lands		19 January 2016	
Rauff Hakeem		Sri Lanka Muslim Congress	Minister of City Planning and Water Supply	4 September 2015	26 October 2018	
M. H. A. Haleem		United National Party	Minister of Post, Postal Service and Muslim Affairs	4 September 2015	26 October 2018	
P. Harrison		United National Party	Minister of Rural Economy	4 September 2015	1 May 2018	
P. Harrison		United National Party	Minister of Social Empowerment	1 May 2018	26 October 2018	
Kabir Hashim		United National Party	Minister of Public Enterprise Development	4 September 2015	25 February 2018	
Kabir Hashim		United National Party	Minister of Higher Education and Highways	25 February 2018	1 May 2018	
Kabir Hashim		United National Party	Minister of Highways and Road Development	1 May 2018	26 October 2018	
Dayasiri Jayasekara		Sri Lanka Freedom Party	Minister of Sports	4 September 2015	12 April 2018	
Chandrani Bandara Jayasinghe		United National Party	Minister of Women and Child Affairs	4 September 2015	26 October 2018	
Akila Viraj Kariyawasam		United National Party	Minister of Education		26 October 2018	
Ravi Karunanayake		United National Party	Minister of Finance		22 May 2017	
Ravi Karunanayake		United National Party	Minister of Foreign Affairs	22 May 2017	10 August 2017	
Gayantha Karunatileka		United National Party	Minister of Parliamentary Reforms and Mass Media	4 September 2015	22 May 2017	
Gayantha Karunatileka		United National Party	Minister of Lands and Parliamentary Reforms	22 May 2017	26 October 2018	
Lakshman Kiriella		United National Party	Minister of University Education and Highways	4 September 2015	14 October 2015	
Lakshman Kiriella		United National Party	Minister of Higher Education and Highways	14 October 2015	25 February 2018	
Lakshman Kiriella		United National Party	Minister of Public Enterprises and Kandy Development	25 February 2018	1 May 2018	
Lakshman Kiriella		United National Party	Minister of Public Enterprise and Kandy City Development	1 May 2018	26 October 2018	
Tilak Marapana		United National Party	Minister of Law and Order and Prison Reforms	4 September 2015	9 November 2015	
Tilak Marapana		United National Party	Minister of Development Assignments	22 May 2017	26 October 2018	
Tilak Marapana		United National Party	Minister of Foreign Affairs	15 August 2017	26 October 2018	
Faiszer Musthapha		Sri Lanka Freedom Party	Minister of Provincial Councils and Local Government	9 September 2015	1 May 2018	
Faiszer Musthapha		Sri Lanka Freedom Party	Minister of Sports	12 April 2018	1 May 2018	
Faiszer Musthapha		Sri Lanka Freedom Party	Minister of Provincial Councils, Local Government and Sports	1 May 2018	26 October 2018	
S. B. Nawinne		United National Party	Minister of Internal Affairs, Wayamba Development and Cultural Affairs	4 September 2015	1 May 2018	
S. B. Nawinne		United National Party	Minister of Internal Affairs and Wayamba Development	1 May 2018	26 October 2018	
Gamini Jayawickrama Perera		United National Party	Minister of Sustainable Development and Wildlife	4 September 2015	25 February 2018	
Gamini Jayawickrama Perera		United National Party	Minister of Buddha Sasana	25 August 2017	26 October 2018	
Sajith Premadasa		United National Party	Minister of Housing and Construction	4 September 2015	26 October 2018	
Susil Premajayanth		Sri Lanka Freedom Party	Minister of Technology, Technical Education and Employment	4 September 2015	21 September 2015	
Susil Premajayanth		Sri Lanka Freedom Party	Minister of Science, Technology and Research	21 September 2015	12 April 2018	
Wijeyadasa Rajapakshe		United National Party	Minister of Justice		23 August 2017	
Wijeyadasa Rajapakshe		United National Party	Minister of Buddha Sasana	4 September 2015	23 August 2017	
Wijeyadasa Rajapakshe		United National Party	Minister of Higher Education and Cultural Affairs	1 May 2018	26 October 2018	
Arjuna Ranatunga		Democratic National Movement	Minister of Ports and Shipping		22 May 2017	
Arjuna Ranatunga		Democratic National Movement	Minister of Petroleum Resources Development	22 May 2017	26 October 2018	
Champika Ranawaka		Jathika Hela Urumaya	Minister of Megapolis and Western Development	4 September 2015	26 October 2018	
Sagala Ratnayaka		United National Party	Minister of Southern Development	4 September 2015	11 November 2015	
Sagala Ratnayaka		United National Party	Minister of Law and Order and Southern Development	11 November 2015	25 February 2018	
Sagala Ratnayaka		United National Party	Minister of Project Management, Youth Affairs and Southern Development	25 February 2018	1 May 2018	
Sagala Ratnayaka		United National Party	Minister of Youth Affairs, Project Management and Southern Development	1 May 2018	26 October 2018	
Mahinda Samarasinghe		Sri Lanka Freedom Party	Minister of Skills Development and Vocational Training	4 September 2015	22 May 2017	
Mahinda Samarasinghe		Sri Lanka Freedom Party	Minister of Ports and Shipping	22 May 2017	26 October 2018	
Mangala Samaraweera		United National Party	Minister of Foreign Affairs		22 May 2017	
Mangala Samaraweera		United National Party	Minister of Finance and Mass Media	22 May 2017	26 October 2018	
Ravindra Samaraweera		United National Party	Minister of Sustainable Development and Wildlife	25 February 2018	1 May 2018	
Ravindra Samaraweera		United National Party	Minister of Labour and Trade Union Relations	1 May 2018	26 October 2018	
Malik Samarawickrama		United National Party	Minister of Development Strategies and International Trade	9 September 2015	26 October 2018	
Malik Samarawickrama		United National Party	Minister of Social Empowerment, Welfare and Kandyan Heritage	12 April 2018	1 May 2018	
Malik Samarawickrama		United National Party	Minister of Labour, Trade Union Relations and Sabaragamuwa Development	12 April 2018	1 May 2018	
Rajitha Senaratne		Democratic National Movement	Minister of Health, Nutrition and Indigenous Medicine	4 September 2015	26 October 2018	
John Senewiratne		Sri Lanka Freedom Party	Minister of Labour and Trade Union Relations	4 September 2015	22 May 2017	
John Senewiratne		Sri Lanka Freedom Party	Minister of Labour, Trade Union Relations and Sabaragamuwa Development	22 May 2017	12 April 2018	
Ranjith Siyambalapitiya		Sri Lanka Freedom Party	Minister of Power and Renewable Energy	4 September 2015	26 October 2018	
Ranjith Siyambalapitiya		Sri Lanka Freedom Party	Minister of Disaster Management	12 April 2018	1 May 2018	
Gamini Vijith Vijithamuni Soysa		Sri Lanka Freedom Party	Minister of Irrigation and Water Resource Management	9 September 2015	1 May 2018	
Gamini Vijith Vijithamuni Soysa		Sri Lanka Freedom Party	Minister of Fisheries, Aquatic Resources Development and Rural Economic Affairs	1 May 2018	26 October 2018	
D. M. Swaminathan		United National Party	Minister of Rehabilitation and Resettlement	24 August 2015	4 September 2015	
D. M. Swaminathan		United National Party	Minister of Rehabilitation, Resettlement and Hindu Religious Affairs	4 September 2015	11 November 2015	
D. M. Swaminathan		United National Party	Minister of Prison Reforms, Rehabilitation, Resettlement and Hindu Religious Affairs	11 November 2015	1 May 2018	
D. M. Swaminathan		United National Party	Minister of Resettlement, Rehabilitation, Northern Development and Hindu Religious Affairs	1 May 2018	26 October 2018	
Chandima Weerakkody		Sri Lanka Freedom Party	Minister of Petroleum and Gas	4 September 2015	21 September 2015	
Chandima Weerakkody		Sri Lanka Freedom Party	Minister of Petroleum Resources Development	21 September 2015	22 May 2017	
Chandima Weerakkody		Sri Lanka Freedom Party	Minister of Skills Development and Vocational Training	22 May 2017	12 April 2018	
Anura Priyadharshana Yapa		Sri Lanka Freedom Party	Minister of Disaster Management	4 September 2015	12 April 2018	

== State ministers ==
Ministers appointed under article 44(1) of the constitution.

Name	Portrait	Party	Office	Took office	Left office	^{Refs.}
Lakshman Yapa Abeywardena		Sri Lanka Freedom Party	State Minister of Finance	9 September 2015	31 May 2017	
Lakshman Yapa Abeywardena		Sri Lanka Freedom Party	State Minister of Public Enterprise Development	31 May 2017	2 May 2018	
J. C. Alawathuwala		United National Party	State Minister of Home Affairs	10 July 2018	26 October 2018	
Ranjith Aluwihare		United National Party	State Minister of Tourism Development and Christian Religious Affairs	12 June 2018	26 October 2018	
Wasantha Aluwihare		United National Party	State Minister of Agriculture	9 September 2015	26 October 2018	
Mahinda Amaraweera		Sri Lanka Freedom Party	State Minister of Mahaweli Development	22 May 2017	2 May 2018	
Palitha Range Bandara		United National Party	State Minister of Skills Development and Vocational Training	9 September 2015	31 May 2017	
Palitha Range Bandara		United National Party	State Minister of Irrigation	31 May 2017	2 May 2018	
Palitha Range Bandara		United National Party	State Minister of Irrigation and Water Resources and Disaster Management	2 May 2018	26 October 2018	
Harsha de Silva		United National Party	State Minister of National Policies and Economic Affairs	25 February 2018	26 October 2018	
Weerakumara Dissanayake		Sri Lanka Freedom Party	State Minister of Mahaweli Development	2 May 2018	26 October 2018	
T. B. Ekanayake		Sri Lanka Freedom Party	State Minister of Lands	9 September 2015	2 May 2018	
Sudarshani Fernandopulle		Sri Lanka Freedom Party	State Minister of City Planning and Water Supply	9 September 2015	2 May 2018	
A. H. M. Fowzie		Sri Lanka Freedom Party	State Minister of National Integration and Reconciliation	9 September 2015	11 May 2018	
A. H. M. Fowzie		Sri Lanka Freedom Party	State Minister of National Unity and Co-existence	11 May 2018	26 October 2018	
Piyasena Gamage		Sri Lanka Freedom Party	State Minister of Law and Order and Southern Development	28 December 2017	25 February 2018	
Piyasena Gamage		Sri Lanka Freedom Party	State Minister of Project Management, Youth Affairs and Southern Development	25 February 2018	2 May 2018	
Piyasena Gamage		Sri Lanka Freedom Party	State Minister of Youth Affairs, Project Management and Southern Development	2 May 2018	26 October 2018	
Mohan Lal Grero		Sri Lanka Freedom Party	State Minister of University Education	9 September 2015	14 October 2015	
Mohan Lal Grero		Sri Lanka Freedom Party	State Minister of Higher Education	14 October 2015	2 May 2018	
Mohan Lal Grero		Sri Lanka Freedom Party	State Minister of Higher Education and Cultural Affairs	2 May 2018	26 October 2018	
M. L. A. M. Hizbullah		Sri Lanka Freedom Party	State Minister of Rehabilitation and Resettlement	9 September 2015	2 May 2018	
M. L. A. M. Hizbullah		Sri Lanka Freedom Party	State Minister of Highways and Road Development	2 May 2018	26 October 2018	
Piyankara Jayaratne		Sri Lanka Freedom Party	State Minister of Law and Order and Prison Reforms	9 September 2015	11 November 2015	
Piyankara Jayaratne		Sri Lanka Freedom Party	State Minister of Law and Order and Southern Development	11 November 2015	21 December 2015	
Piyankara Jayaratne		Sri Lanka Freedom Party	State Minister of Provincial Councils and Local Government	21 December 2015	26 October 2018	
Lucky Jayawardena		United National Party	State Minister of Hill Country New Villages, Infrastructure & Community Development	12 June 2018	10 July 2018	
Lucky Jayawardena		United National Party	State Minister of City Planning and Water Supply	10 July 2018	26 October 2018	
Vijayakala Maheswaran		United National Party	State Minister of Child Affairs	9 September 2015	5 July 2018	
Ajith Perera		United National Party	State Minister of Power and Renewable Energy	25 February 2018	26 October 2018	
Dilan Perera		Sri Lanka Freedom Party	State Minister of Highways	9 September 2015	2 May 2018	
Niroshan Perera		United National Party	State Minister of National Policies and Economic Affairs	9 September 2015	26 October 2018	
A. D. Champika Premadasa		United National Party	State Minister of Industry and Commerce Affairs	9 September 2015	2 May 2018	
A. D. Champika Premadasa		United National Party	State Minister of Plantation Industries	2 May 2018	26 October 2018	
Velusami Radhakrishnan		Up-Country People's Front	State Minister of Education		26 October 2018	
Ravindra Samaraweera		United National Party	State Minister of Labour and Trade Union Relations	9 September 2015	25 February 2018	
Wasantha Senanayake		United National Party	State Minister of Irrigation and Water Resources Management	9 September 2015	31 May 2017	
Wasantha Senanayake		United National Party	State Minister of Foreign Affairs	31 May 2017	26 October 2018	
Sujeewa Senasinghe		United National Party	State Minister of International Trade	9 September 2015	26 October 2018	
Lakshman Senewiratne		Sri Lanka Freedom Party	State Minister of Science, Technology and Research	6 April 2016	2 May 2018	
Lakshman Senewiratne		Sri Lanka Freedom Party	State Minister of Science, Technology, Research, Skills Development and Vocational Training and Kandyan Heritage	2 May 2018	26 October 2018	
Dilip Wedaarachchi		United National Party	State Minister of Fisheries and Aquatic Resources Development	9 September 2015	2 May 2018	
Dilip Wedaarachchi		United National Party	State Minister of Fisheries and Aquatic Resources Development and Rural Economic Affairs	2 May 2018	26 October 2018	
Eran Wickramaratne		United National Party	State Minister of Finance	31 May 2017	26 October 2018	
Ruwan Wijewardene		United National Party	State Minister of Defence		26 October 2018	
Sriyani Wijewickrama		Sri Lanka Freedom Party	State Minister of Provincial Councils and Local Government	15 December 2017	2 May 2018	
Sriyani Wijewickrama		Sri Lanka Freedom Party	State Minister of Provincial Councils, Local Government and Sports	2 May 2018	26 October 2018	

== Deputy ministers ==
Ministers appointed under article 45(1) of the constitution.

Name	Portrait	Party	Office	Took office	Left office	^{Refs.}
Ashoka Abeysinghe		United National Party	Deputy Minister of Transport	9 September 2015	14 October 2015	
Ashoka Abeysinghe		United National Party	Deputy Minister of Transport and Civil Aviation	14 October 2015	26 October 2018	
Lasantha Alagiyawanna		Sri Lanka Freedom Party	Deputy Minister of Megapolis and Western Development	9 September 2015	31 May 2017	
Lasantha Alagiyawanna		Sri Lanka Freedom Party	Deputy Minister of Finance and Mass Media	31 May 2017	26 October 2018	
J. C. Alawathuwala		United National Party	Deputy Minister of Home Affairs	25 February 2018	10 July 2018	
Ameer Ali		All Ceylon Makkal Congress	Deputy Minister of Rural Economic Affairs	9 September 2015	2 May 2018	
Ameer Ali		All Ceylon Makkal Congress	Deputy Minister of Fisheries and Aquatic Resources Development and Rural Economic Affairs	2 May 2018	26 October 2018	
Indika Bandaranaike		Sri Lanka Freedom Party	Deputy Minister of Housing and Construction	9 September 2015	26 October 2018	
Tharanath Basnayake		Sri Lanka Freedom Party	Deputy Minister of Telecommunication and Digital Infrastructure	9 September 2015	2 May 2018	
Harsha de Silva		United National Party	Deputy Minister of Foreign Affairs	9 September 2015	31 May 2017	
Harsha de Silva		United National Party	Deputy Minister of National Policies and Economic Affairs	31 May 2017	25 February 2018	
Cassim Faizal		Sri Lanka Muslim Congress	Deputy Minister of Health, Nutrition and Indigenous Medicine	9 September 2015	26 October 2018	
Arundika Fernando		Sri Lanka Freedom Party	Deputy Minister of Tourism Development and Christian Religious Affairs	9 September 2015	12 September 2017	
Anoma Gamage		United National Party	Deputy Minister of Petroleum and Petroleum Gas Affairs	9 September 2015	21 September 2015	
Anoma Gamage		United National Party	Deputy Minister of Petroleum Resources Development	21 September 2015	26 October 2018	
Dunesh Gankanda		United National Party	Deputy Minister of Disaster Management	9 September 2015	2 May 2018	
Dunesh Gankanda		United National Party	Deputy Minister of Lands and Parliamentary Reforms	2 May 2018	26 October 2018	
Edward Gunasekara		United National Party	Deputy Minister of Internal Affairs and Wayamba Development	12 June 2018	26 October 2018	
H. M. M. Harees		Sri Lanka Muslim Congress	Deputy Minister of Sports	9 September 2015	2 May 2018	
H. M. M. Harees		Sri Lanka Muslim Congress	Deputy Minister of Public Enterprise and Kandy City Development	2 May 2018	26 October 2018	
Nalin Bandara Jayamaha		United National Party	Deputy Minister of Public Administration and Management and Law and Order	12 June 2018	26 October 2018	
Anuradha Jayaratne		Sri Lanka Freedom Party	Deputy Minister of Mahaweli Development and Environment	10 September 2015	2 May 2018	
Sumedha G. Jayasena		Sri Lanka Freedom Party	Deputy Minister of Sustainable Development and Wildlife	9 September 2015	2 May 2018	
Nimal Lanza		Sri Lanka Freedom Party	Deputy Minister of Home Affairs	9 September 2015	19 December 2017	
Ajith Mannapperuma		United National Party	Deputy Minister of Environment	12 June 2018	26 October 2018	
Cader Cader Masthan		Sri Lanka Freedom Party	Deputy Minister of Resettlement, Rehabilitation and Northern Development	12 June 2018	26 October 2018	
Dushmantha Mithrapala		Sri Lanka Freedom Party	Deputy Minister of Justice	10 September 2015	2 May 2018	
Dushmantha Mithrapala		Sri Lanka Freedom Party	Deputy Minister of Buddha Sasana	21 December 2015	26 October 2018	
Dushmantha Mithrapala		Sri Lanka Freedom Party	Deputy Minister of Justice and Prison Reforms	2 May 2018	26 October 2018	
Seyed Ali Zahir Moulana		Sri Lanka Muslim Congress	Deputy Minister of National Integration, Reconciliation and Official Languages	2 May 2018	26 October 2018	
Nishantha Muthuhettigama		Sri Lanka Freedom Party	Deputy Minister of Ports and Shipping Affairs	9 September 2015	26 October 2018	
Manusha Nanayakkara		Sri Lanka Freedom Party	Deputy Minister of Foreign Employment	6 April 2016	2 May 2018	
Manusha Nanayakkara		Sri Lanka Freedom Party	Deputy Minister of Telecommunication, Digital Infrastructure and Foreign Employment	2 May 2018	26 October 2018	
Karu Paranawithana		United National Party	Deputy Minister of Provincial Councils and Local Government	9 September 2015	3 December 2015	
Karu Paranawithana		United National Party	Deputy Minister of Parliamentary Reforms and Mass Media	4 December 2015	31 May 2017	
Karu Paranawithana		United National Party	Deputy Minister of Skills Development and Vocational Training	31 May 2017	2 May 2018	
Karu Paranawithana		United National Party	Deputy Minister of Science, Technology, Research, Skills Development and Vocational Training and Kandyan Heritage	2 May 2018	26 October 2018	
Buddhika Pathirana		United National Party	Deputy Minister of Industry and Commerce	19 June 2018	26 October 2018	
Ajith Perera		United National Party	Deputy Minister of Power and Renewable Energy	9 September 2015	25 February 2018	
Lakshman Wasantha Perera		Sri Lanka Freedom Party	Deputy Minister of Plantation Industries	9 September 2015	2 May 2018	
Susantha Punchinilame		Sri Lanka Freedom Party	Deputy Minister of Public Administration and Management	9 September 2015	2 May 2018	
Angajan Ramanathan		Sri Lanka Freedom Party	Deputy Minister of Agriculture	12 June 2018	26 October 2018	
Ranjan Ramanayake		United National Party	Deputy Minister of Social Empowerment and Welfare	9 September 2015	31 May 2017	
Ranjan Ramanayake		United National Party	Deputy Minister of Social Empowerment, Welfare and Kandyan Heritage	31 May 2017	2 May 2018	
Ranjan Ramanayake		United National Party	Deputy Minister of Social Empowerment	2 May 2018	26 October 2018	
Muthu Sivalingam		Ceylon Workers' Congress	Deputy Minister of Primary Industries	15 February 2018	2 May 2018	
Muthu Sivalingam		Ceylon Workers' Congress	Deputy Minister of Social Welfare and Primary Industries	2 May 2018	26 October 2018	
Palitha Thewarapperuma		United National Party	Deputy Minister of Internal Affairs, Wayamba Development and Cultural Affairs	2 May 2018	6 April 2016	
Palitha Thewarapperuma		United National Party	Deputy Minister of Sustainable Development, Wildlife and Regional Development	2 May 2018	26 October 2018	
Eran Wickramaratne		United National Party	Deputy Minister of Public Enterprise Development	9 September 2015	31 May 2017	
Duleep Wijesekera		Sri Lanka Freedom Party	Deputy Minister of Post, Postal Services and Muslim Religious Affairs	9 September 2015	29 October 2017	
