= Fourth Sirisena cabinet =

- Cabinet of Sri Lanka

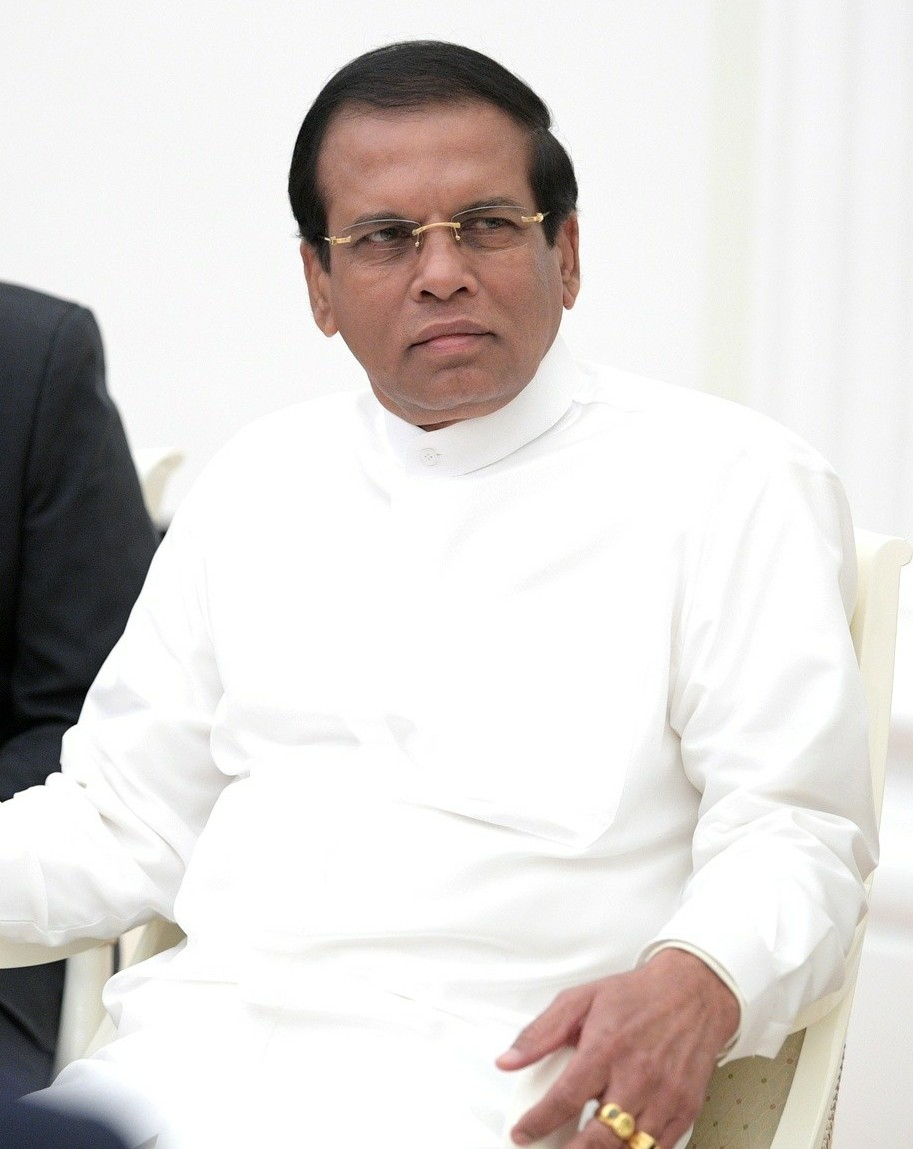
- Date formed: 20 December 2018
- Date dissolved: 21 November 2019

People and organisations
- Head of state: Maithripala Sirisena
- Head of government: Maithripala Sirisena
- Deputy head of government: Ranil Wickremesinghe
- Total no. of members: 63
- Member party: United National Front for Good Governance
- Status in legislature: Minority government
- Opposition party: Sri Lanka Podujana Peramuna
- Opposition leader: Mahinda Rajapaksa

History
- Outgoing election: 2019
- Legislature term: 15th
- Predecessor: Sirisena III
- Successor: Gotabaya Rajapaksa I

The fourth Sirisena cabinet was the central government of Sri Lanka led by President Maithripala Sirisena. It was formed in December 2018 following the end of the constitutional crisis and ended in November 2019 following the election of Sirisena's successor Gotabaya Rajapaksa.

== Cabinet members ==
Ministers appointed under article 43(1) of the constitution.

Name	Portrait	Party	Office	Took office	Left office	^{Refs.}
Maithripala Sirisena		Sri Lanka Freedom Party	President	(Note: Continuation of same office held in previous cabinet.)	18 November 2019	
Maithripala Sirisena		Sri Lanka Freedom Party	Minister of Mahaweli Development and Environment		18 November 2019	
Maithripala Sirisena		Sri Lanka Freedom Party	Minister of Defence	20 December 2018	18 November 2019	
Ranil Wickremesinghe		United National Party	Prime Minister	16 December 2018	21 November 2019	
Ranil Wickremesinghe		United National Party	Minister of National Policies, Economic Affairs, Resettlement, Rehabilitation, Northern Province Development, Vocational Training, Skills Development and Youth Affairs	20 December 2018	18 March 2019	
Ranil Wickremesinghe		United National Party	Minister of National Policies, Economic Affairs, Resettlement and Rehabilitation, Northern Province Development and Youth Affairs	18 March 2019	21 November 2019	
Vajira Abeywardena		United National Party	Minister of Internal and Home Affairs and Provincial Councils and Local Government	20 December 2018	21 November 2019	
John Amaratunga		United National Party	Minister of Tourism Development, Wildlife and Christian Religious Affairs	20 December 2018	21 November 2019	
Thalatha Atukorale		United National Party	Minister of Justice and Prison Reforms	20 December 2018	21 November 2019	
Risad Badhiutheen		All Ceylon Makkal Congress	Minister of Industry, Commerce, Resettlement of Protracted Displaced Persons and Co-operative Development	20 December 2018	18 March 2019	
Risad Badhiutheen		All Ceylon Makkal Congress	Minister of Industry and Commerce, Resettlement of Protracted Displaced Persons, Co-operative Development and Vocational Training and Skills Development	18 March 2019	3 June 2019	
R. M. Ranjith Madduma Bandara		United National Party	Minister of Public Administration and Disaster Management	20 December 2018	29 May 2019	
R. M. Ranjith Madduma Bandara		United National Party	Minister of Public Administration, Disaster Management and Rural Economic Affairs	29 May 2019	26 July 2019	
R. M. Ranjith Madduma Bandara		United National Party	Minister of Public Administration, Disaster Management and Livestock Development	26 July 2019	21 November 2019	
Palani Digambaran		National Union of Workers	Minister of Hill Country, New Villages, Infrastructure and Community Development	20 December 2018	21 November 2019	
Navin Dissanayake		United National Party	Minister of Plantation Industries	20 December 2018	21 November 2019	
Harin Fernando		United National Party	Minister of Telecommunication, Digital Infrastructure, Foreign Employment and Sports	20 December 2018	21 December 2018	
Harin Fernando		United National Party	Minister of Telecommunication, Foreign Employment and Sports	21 December 2018	21 November 2019	
Daya Gamage		United National Party	Minister of Labour, Trade Union Relations and Social Empowerment	20 December 2018	11 January 2019	
Daya Gamage		United National Party	Minister of Primary Industries and Social Empowerment	11 January 2019	21 November 2019	
Mano Ganesan		Democratic People's Front	Minister of National Integration, Official Languages, Social Progress and Hindu Religious Affairs	20 December 2018	21 November 2019	
Rauff Hakeem		Sri Lanka Muslim Congress	Minister of City Planning, Water Supply and Higher Education	20 December 2018	3 June 2019	
M. H. A. Haleem		United National Party	Minister of Postal Services and Muslim Religious Affairs	20 December 2018	3 June 2019	
M. H. A. Haleem		United National Party	Minister of Postal Services and Muslim Religious Affairs	19 June 2019	21 November 2019	
P. Harrison		United National Party	Minister of Agriculture, Rural Economic Affairs, Livestock Development, Irrigation, Fisheries and Aquatic Resources Development	20 December 2018	29 May 2019	
P. Harrison		United National Party	Minister of Agriculture, Livestock Development, Irrigation, Fisheries and Aquatic Resources Development	29 May 2019	26 July 2019	
P. Harrison		United National Party	Minister of Agriculture, Rural Economic Affairs, Irrigation, Fisheries and Aquatic Resources Development	26 July 2019	21 November 2019	
Kabir Hashim		United National Party	Minister of Highways, Road Development and Petroleum Resources Development	20 December 2018	4 June 2019	
Kabir Hashim		United National Party	Minister of Highways, Road Development and Petroleum Resources Development	19 June 2019	21 November 2019	
Chandrani Bandara Jayasinghe		United National Party	Minister of Women and Child Affairs and Dry Zone Development	20 December 2018	21 November 2019	
Akila Viraj Kariyawasam		United National Party	Minister of Education	20 December 2018	21 November 2019	
Ravi Karunanayake		United National Party	Minister of Power, Energy and Business Development	20 December 2018	21 November 2019	
Gayantha Karunatileka		United National Party	Minister of Lands and Parliamentary Reforms	20 December 2018	21 November 2019	
Lakshman Kiriella		United National Party	Minister of Public Enterprise, Kandyan Heritage and Kandy Development	20 December 2018	21 November 2019	
Tilak Marapana		United National Party	Minister of Foreign Affairs	20 December 2018	21 November 2019	
Gamini Jayawickrama Perera		United National Party	Minister of Buddha Sasana and Wayamba Development	20 December 2018	21 November 2019	
Sajith Premadasa		United National Party	Minister of Housing, Construction and Cultural Affairs	20 December 2018	21 November 2019	
Arjuna Ranatunga		Democratic National Movement	Minister of Transport and Civil Aviation	20 December 2018	21 November 2019	
Champika Ranawaka		Jathika Hela Urumaya	Minister of Megapolis and Western Development	20 December 2018	21 November 2019	
Sagala Ratnayaka		United National Party	Minister of Ports, Shipping and Southern Development	20 December 2018	21 November 2019	
Mangala Samaraweera		United National Party	Minister of Finance and Mass Media	20 December 2018	22 February 2019	
Mangala Samaraweera		United National Party	Minister of Finance	22 February 2019	21 November 2019	
Malik Samarawickrama		United National Party	Minister of Development Strategies, International Trade and Science, Technology and Research	20 December 2018	21 December 2018	
Malik Samarawickrama		United National Party	Minister of Development Strategies and International Trade	21 December 2018	21 November 2019	
Rajitha Senaratne		Democratic National Movement	Minister of Health, Nutrition and Indigenous Medicine	20 December 2018	21 November 2019	

== Non-cabinet and state ministers ==
Ministers appointed under article 44(1) of the constitution.

Name	Portrait	Party	Office	Took office	Left office	^{Refs.}
Ashoka Abeysinghe		United National Party	State Minister of Transport and Civil Aviation	21 December 2018	21 November 2019	
J. C. Alawathuwala		United National Party	State Minister of Internal and Home Affairs and Provincial Councils and Local Government	21 December 2018	21 November 2019	
Ameer Ali		All Ceylon Makkal Congress	State Minister of Agriculture, Irrigation and Rural Economic Affairs	21 December 2018	3 June 2019	
Ranjith Aluwihare		United National Party	State Minister of Tourism Development	21 December 2018	11 January 2019	
Ranjith Aluwihare		United National Party	State Minister of Tourism Development, Wildlife and Christian Religious Affairs	11 January 2019	21 November 2019	
Wasantha Aluwihare		United National Party	State Minister of Agriculture, Irrigation and Rural Economic Affairs	21 December 2018	21 November 2019	
Harsha de Silva		United National Party	Non-Cabinet Minister of Public Distribution and Economic Reforms	21 December 2018	11 January 2019	
Harsha de Silva		United National Party	Non-Cabinet Minister of Economic Affairs and Public Distribution	11 January 2019	21 November 2019	
Cassim Faizal		Sri Lanka Muslim Congress	State Minister of Health, Nutrition and Indigenous Medicine	21 December 2018	3 June 2019	
H. M. M. Harees		Sri Lanka Muslim Congress	State Minister of Provincial Councils and Local Government	21 December 2018	3 June 2019	
Lucky Jayawardena		United National Party	State Minister of City Planning and Water Supply	21 December 2018	21 November 2019	
Vijayakala Maheswaran		United National Party	State Minister of Education	21 December 2018	21 November 2019	
Ajith Mannapperuma		United National Party	State Minister of Mahaweli Development and Environment	31 January 2019	21 November 2019	
Seyed Ali Zahir Moulana		Sri Lanka Muslim Congress	State Minister of Social Empowerment	21 December 2018	3 June 2019	
Ajith Perera		United National Party	Non-Cabinet Minister of Digital Infrastructure and Information Technology	21 December 2018	21 November 2019	
Niroshan Perera		United National Party	State Minister of National Policies and Economic Affairs	21 December 2018	21 November 2019	
A. D. Champika Premadasa		United National Party	State Minister of Power and Renewable Energy	21 December 2018	21 November 2019	
Velusami Radhakrishnan		Up-Country People's Front	Non-Cabinet Minister of Special Areas Development	11 January 2019	21 November 2019	
Ranjan Ramanayake		United National Party	State Minister of Highways and Road Development	21 December 2018	21 November 2019	
Ravindra Samaraweera		United National Party	Non-Cabinet Minister of Labour and Trade Union Relations	11 January 2019	21 November 2019	
Wasantha Senanayake		United National Party	State Minister of Foreign Affairs	29 May 2019	21 November 2019	
Sujeewa Senasinghe		United National Party	Non-Cabinet Minister of Science, Technology and Research	21 December 2018	21 November 2019	
Vadivel Suresh		United National Party	State Minister of Plantation Industries	21 December 2018	21 November 2019	
Dilip Wedaarachchi		United National Party	State Minister of Fisheries and Aquatic Resources Development	21 December 2018	21 November 2019	
Eran Wickramaratne		United National Party	State Minister of Finance	21 December 2018	21 November 2019	
Ruwan Wijewardene		United National Party	State Minister of Defence	21 December 2018	21 November 2019	
Ruwan Wijewardene		United National Party	Non-Cabinet Minister of Mass Media	22 February 2019	21 November 2019	

== Deputy ministers ==
Ministers appointed under article 45(1) of the constitution.

Name	Portrait	Party	Office	Took office	Left office	^{Refs.}
Anoma Gamage		United National Party	Deputy Minister of Petroleum Resources Development	21 December 2018	21 November 2019	
Edward Gunasekara		United National Party	Deputy Minister of Lands and Parliamentary Reforms	21 December 2018	21 November 2019	
Nalin Bandara Jayamaha		United National Party	Deputy Minister of Development Strategies and International Trade	21 December 2018	21 November 2019	
M. A. M. Maharoof		All Ceylon Makkal Congress	Deputy Minister of Ports and Shipping	11 January 2019	3 June 2019	
Ajith Mannapperuma		United National Party	Deputy Minister of Environment	21 December 2018	31 January 2019	
Karu Paranawithana		United National Party	Deputy Minister of Skills Development and Vocational Training	21 December 2018	21 November 2019	
Buddhika Pathirana		United National Party	Deputy Minister of Industry and Commerce	21 December 2018	21 November 2019	
Palitha Thewarapperuma		United National Party	Deputy Minister of Social Empowerment	21 December 2018	21 November 2019	
