= Third Sirisena cabinet =

- Cabinet of Sri Lanka

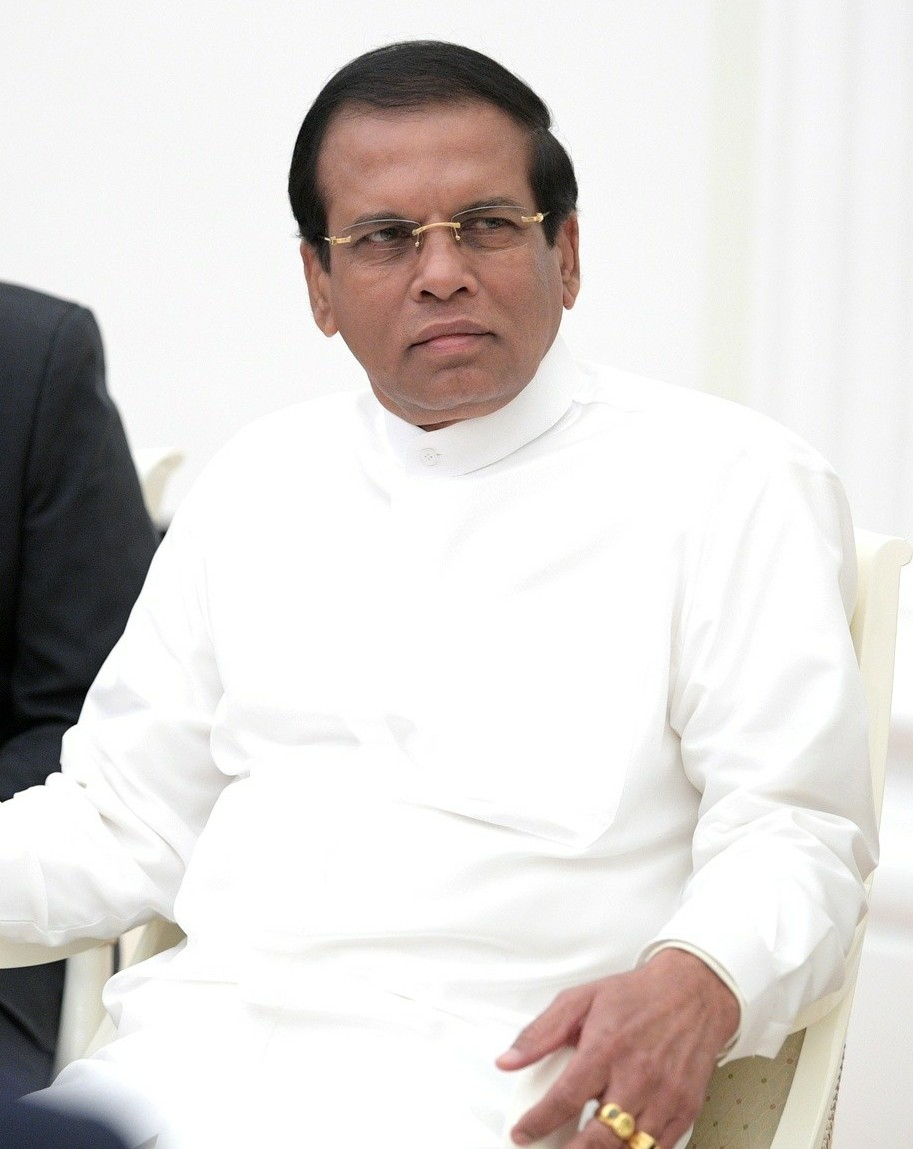
- Date formed: 29 October 2018
- Date dissolved: 15 December 2018

People and organisations
- Head of state: Maithripala Sirisena
- Head of government: Maithripala Sirisena
- Deputy head of government: Mahinda Rajapaksa
- Total no. of members: 54
- Member parties: United People's Freedom Alliance; Sri Lanka Podujana Peramuna
- Status in legislature: Minority coalition
- Opposition party: None (Note: Other parties in the Parliament (the United National Front for Good Governance, Tamil National Alliance and Janatha Vimukthi Peramuna) refused to recognise the government.)
- Opposition leader: None

History
- Legislature term: 15th
- Predecessor: Sirisena II
- Successor: Sirisena IV

The third Sirisena cabinet was a short-lived central government of Sri Lanka led by President Maithripala Sirisena during the 2018 constitutional crisis. The cabinet and the prime minister was declared as unconstitutional by the Supreme Court of Sri Lanka.

== Cabinet members ==
Ministers appointed under article 43(1) of the constitution.

Name	Portrait	Party	Office	Took office	Left office	^{Refs.}
Maithripala Sirisena		Sri Lanka Freedom Party	President	(Note: Continuation of same office held in previous cabinet.)	(Note: Continued to hold same office in next cabinet.)	
Maithripala Sirisena		Sri Lanka Freedom Party	Minister of Defence		1 November 2018	
Maithripala Sirisena		Sri Lanka Freedom Party	Minister of Mahaweli Development and Environment			
Maithripala Sirisena		Sri Lanka Freedom Party	Minister of Defence, Law and Order and Youth Affairs	1 November 2018		
Mahinda Rajapaksa		Sri Lanka Freedom Party	Prime Minister	26 October 2018	11 November 2018	
Mahinda Rajapaksa		Sri Lanka Podujana Peramuna	Prime Minister	11 November 2018	15 December 2018	
Mahinda Rajapaksa		Sri Lanka Freedom Party	Minister of Finance and Economic Affairs	29 October 2018	11 November 2018	
Mahinda Rajapaksa		Sri Lanka Podujana Peramuna	Minister of Finance and Economic Affairs	11 November 2018	15 December 2018	
Mahinda Yapa Abeywardena		Sri Lanka Freedom Party	Minister of Industry and Commerce	9 November 2018	11 November 2018	
Mahinda Yapa Abeywardena		Sri Lanka Podujana Peramuna	Minister of Industry and Commerce	11 November 2018	15 December 2018	
Mahinda Amaraweera		Sri Lanka Freedom Party	Minister of Agriculture	29 October 2018	15 December 2018	
Sarath Amunugama		Sri Lanka Freedom Party	Minister of Foreign Affairs	29 October 2018	15 December 2018	
S. M. Chandrasena		Sri Lanka Freedom Party	Minister of Plantation Industries	9 November 2018	15 December 2018	
Nimal Siripala de Silva		Sri Lanka Freedom Party	Minister of Transport and Civil Aviation	29 October 2018	15 December 2018	
Douglas Devananda		Eelam People's Democratic Party	Minister of Resettlement, Rehabilitation, Northern Development and Hindu Religious Affairs	29 October 2018	15 December 2018	
Duminda Dissanayake		Sri Lanka Freedom Party	Minister of Irrigation, Water Resources and Disaster Management	1 November 2018	15 December 2018	
S. B. Dissanayake		Sri Lanka Freedom Party	Minister of Highways and Road Development	7 November 2018	15 December 2018	
Johnston Fernando		Sri Lanka Freedom Party	Minister of Trade, Consumer Affairs, Co-operative Development and Christian Religious Affairs	9 November 2018	11 November 2018	
Johnston Fernando		Sri Lanka Podujana Peramuna	Minister of Trade, Consumer Affairs, Co-operative Development and Christian Religious Affairs	11 November 2018	15 December 2018	
Udaya Gammanpila		Pivithuru Hela Urumaya	Minister of Buddha Sasana and Religious Affairs	9 November 2018	15 December 2018	
Bandula Gunawardena		Sri Lanka Freedom Party	Minister of International Trade and Investment Promotion	8 November 2018	15 December 2018	
Dinesh Gunawardena		Mahajana Eksath Peramuna	Minister of Megapolis and Western Development	4 November 2018	15 December 2018	
M. L. A. M. Hizbullah		Sri Lanka Freedom Party	Minister of City Planning and Water Supply	9 November 2018	15 December 2018	
Dayasiri Jayasekara		Sri Lanka Freedom Party	Minister of Skills Development and Vocational Training	1 November 2018	15 December 2018	
Gamini Lokuge		Sri Lanka Freedom Party	Minister of Labour, Foreign Employment and Petroleum Resources Development	9 November 2018	11 November 2018	
Gamini Lokuge		Sri Lanka Podujana Peramuna	Minister of Labour, Foreign Employment and Petroleum Resources Development	11 November 2018	15 December 2018	
Faiszer Musthapha		Sri Lanka Freedom Party	Minister of Provincial Councils, Local Government and Sports	29 October 2018	15 December 2018	
Vasudeva Nanayakkara		Democratic Left Front	Minister of National Integration, Reconciliation, and Official Languages	4 November 2018	15 December 2018	
S. B. Nawinne		United National Party	Minister of Cultural Affairs, Internal Affairs and Regional Development	2 November 2018	15 December 2018	
Susil Premajayantha		Sri Lanka Freedom Party	Minister of Public Administration, Home Affairs and Justice	8 November 2018	11 November 2018	
Susil Premajayantha		Sri Lanka Podujana Peramuna	Minister of Public Administration, Home Affairs and Justice	11 November 2018	15 December 2018	
Chamal Rajapaksa		Sri Lanka Freedom Party	Minister of Health, Nutrition and Indigenous Medicine	7 November 2018	15 December 2018	
Wijeyadasa Rajapakshe		United National Party	Minister of Education and Higher Education	29 October 2018	15 December 2018	
C. B. Ratnayake		Sri Lanka Freedom Party	Minister of Posts and Telecommunications	9 November 2018	11 November 2018	
C. B. Ratnayake		Sri Lanka Podujana Peramuna	Minister of Posts and Telecommunications	11 November 2018	15 December 2018	
Mahinda Samarasinghe		Sri Lanka Freedom Party	Minister of Ports and Shipping	29 October 2018	15 December 2018	
Wasantha Senanayake		United National Party	Minister of Tourism and Wild Life	29 October 2018	15 December 2018	
Gamini Vijith Vijithamuni Soysa		Sri Lanka Freedom Party	Minister of Fisheries, Aquatic Resources Development and Rural Economic Affairs	29 October 2018	15 December 2018	
Arumugam Thondaman		Ceylon Workers' Congress	Minister of Hill Country New Villages, Infrastructure and Community Development	29 October 2018	15 December 2018	
Wimal Weerawansa		National Freedom Front	Minister of Housing and Social Welfare	9 November 2018	15 December 2018	

== State ministers ==
Ministers appointed under article 44(1) of the constitution.

Name	Portrait	Party	Office	Took office	Left office	^{Refs.}
S. M. Chandrasena		Sri Lanka Freedom Party	State Minister of Social Empowerment	8 November 2018	15 December 2018	
Salinda Dissanayake		Sri Lanka Freedom Party	State Minister of Indigenous Medicine	8 November 2018	15 December 2018	
A. H. M. Fowzie		Sri Lanka Freedom Party	State Minister of National Unity, Co-existence and Muslim Religious Affairs	3 November 2018	15 December 2018	
Piyasena Gamage		Sri Lanka Freedom Party	State Minister of Youth, Women and Child Affairs	1 November 2018	15 December 2018	
Dunesh Gankanda		United National Party	State Minister of Environment	30 October 2018	15 December 2018	
Mohan Lal Grero		Sri Lanka Freedom Party	State Minister of Education and Higher Education	1 November 2018	15 December 2018	
M. L. A. M. Hizbullah		Sri Lanka Freedom Party	State Minister of Highways and Road Development	1 November 2018	15 December 2018	
Lakshman Wasantha Perera		Sri Lanka Freedom Party	State Minister of International Trade and Investment Promotion	8 November 2018	15 December 2018	
Keheliya Rambukwella		Sri Lanka Freedom Party	State Minister of Mass Media and Digital Infrastructure	4 November 2018	15 December 2018	
C. B. Rathnayake		Sri Lanka Freedom Party	State Minister of Transport	8 November 2018	15 December 2018	
Lakshman Senewiratne		Sri Lanka Freedom Party	State Minister of Defence	1 November 2018	15 December 2018	
Pavithra Devi Wanniarachchi		Sri Lanka Freedom Party	State Minister of Petroleum Resources Development	7 November 2018	15 December 2018	
Sriyani Wijewickrama		Sri Lanka Freedom Party	State Minister of Provincial Councils, Local Government and Sports	1 November 2018	15 December 2018	
Anura Priyadharshana Yapa		Sri Lanka Freedom Party	State Minister of Finance	8 November 2018	11 November 2018	
Anura Priyadharshana Yapa		Sri Lanka Podujana Peramuna	State Minister of Finance	11 November 2018	15 December 2018	

== Deputy ministers ==
Ministers appointed under article 45(1) of the constitution.

Name	Portrait	Party	Office	Took office	Left office	^{Refs.}
Ananda Aluthgamage		United National Party	Deputy Minister of Tourism and Wild Life	29 October 2018	11 November 2018	
Ananda Aluthgamage		Sri Lanka Podujana Peramuna	Deputy Minister of Tourism and Wild Life	11 November 2018	15 December 2018	
Indika Bandaranaike		Sri Lanka Freedom Party	Deputy Minister of Housing and Urban Development	1 November 2018	15 December 2018	
Cader Cader Masthan		Sri Lanka Freedom Party	Deputy Minister of Resettlement, Rehabilitation and Northern Development	1 November 2018	15 December 2018	
Dushmantha Mithrapala		Sri Lanka Freedom Party	Deputy Minister of Justice and Prison Reforms	1 November 2018	15 December 2018	
Nishantha Muthuhettigama		Sri Lanka Freedom Party	Deputy Minister of Ports and Shipping	1 November 2018	15 December 2018	
Manusha Nanayakkara		Sri Lanka Freedom Party	Deputy Minister of Labour and Foreign Employment	1 November 2018	6 November 2018	
Ashoka Priyantha		United National Party	Deputy Minister of Cultural and Internal Affairs and Regional Development (North Western)	4 November 2018	15 December 2018	
Angajan Ramanathan		Sri Lanka Freedom Party	Deputy Minister of Agriculture	1 November 2018	15 December 2018	
S. Viyalendiran		People's Liberation Organisation of Tamil Eelam	Deputy Minister of Regional Development (Eastern Development)	2 November 2018	15 December 2018	
