= Sirisena cabinet =

Sirisena cabinet may refer to:

- First Sirisena cabinet
- Second Sirisena cabinet
- Third Sirisena cabinet
- Fourth Sirisena cabinet
