= Minister of Foreign Affairs (Sri Lanka) =

Government ministry of Sri Lanka

Minister of Foreign Affairs of Sri Lanka
- විදේශ කටයුතු අමාත්‍ය
- Emblem of Sri Lanka

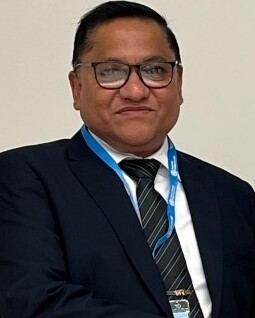
- Incumbent; Vijitha Herath since 25 September 2024
- Ministry of Foreign Affairs
- Style: Honourable
- Nominator: President of Sri Lanka
- Appointer: The president on advice of the prime minister
- Inaugural holder: Don Stephen Senanayake
- Formation: 24 September 1947
- Website: www.mea.gov.lk

The minister of foreign affairs is an appointment in the Cabinet of Sri Lanka who is responsible for overseeing the international diplomacy of the Government of Sri Lanka. The post was first created in 1947 as the minister of external affairs and defence, in 1977 the Ministry of External Affairs and Defence separated into two ministries, the Ministry of Foreign Affairs and the Ministry of Defence. Prior to the separation of the post the minister of external affairs and defence was held by the prime minister since 1947, with a parliamentary secretary for defence and external affairs who was an elected parliamentarian and was the de facto foreign minister.

== List of ministers ==
Parties

- United National Party (13)
- Sri Lanka Freedom Party (9)
- Sri Lanka Podujana Peramuna (2)
- Mahajana Eksath Peramuna (1)
- National People's Power (1)

Status

- ^{†} Died or assassinated in office
- Denotes acting foreign minister

| No. | Portrait | Minister (Birth-Death) Constituency | Term of office | | | Political party | Ministry | Head of government | Ref |
| No. | Portrait | Minister (Birth-Death) Constituency | From | To | Period | Political party | Ministry | Head of government | Ref |
Minister of Defence and External Affairs
| 1 | | Don Stephen Senanayake දොන් ස්ටීවන් සේනානායක (1884–1952); Mirigama | 24 September 1947 | 22 March 1952^{[†]} | 4 years, 180 days | United National Party | D. S. Senanayake | Self | |
| 2 | | Dudley Senanayake ඩඩ්ලි ශෙල්ටන් සේනානායක (1911–1973); Dedigama | 22 March 1952 | 12 October 1953 | 1 year, 204 days | United National Party | D. Senanayake I | Self | |
| 3 | | General; Sir John Kotelawala ශ්‍රිමත් ජෝන් ලයනල් කොතලාවල (1897–1980); Dodangaslanda | 12 October 1953 | 12 April 1956 | 2 years, 183 days | United National Party | Kotelawala | Self | |
| 4 | | S. W. R. D. Bandaranaike සොලොමන් වෙස්ට් රිජ්වේ ඩයස් බණ්ඩාරනායක (1899–1959); Attanagalla | 12 April 1956 | 26 September 1959^{[†]} | 3 years, 167 days | Sri Lanka Freedom Party | S. W. R. D. Bandaranaike | Self | |
| 5 | | Wijeyananda Dahanayake විජයානන්ද දහනායක (1902–1997); Galle | 26 September 1959 | 20 March 1960 | 176 days | Sri Lanka Freedom Party | Dahanayake | Self | |
| (2) | | Dudley Senanayake ඩඩ්ලි ශෙල්ටන් සේනානායක (1911–1973); Dedigama | 21 March 1960 | 21 July 1960 | 122 days | United National Party | D. Senanayake II | Self | |
| 6 | | Sirimavo Bandaranaike සිරිමාවෝ බණ්ඩාරනායක (1916–2000); Attanagalla | 21 July 1960 | 25 March 1965 | 4 years, 247 days | Sri Lanka Freedom Party | S. Bandaranaike I | Self | |
| (2) | | Dudley Senanayake ඩඩ්ලි ශෙල්ටන් සේනානායක (1911–1973); Dedigama | 25 March 1965 | 29 May 1970 | 5 years, 65 days | United National Party | D. Senanayake III | Self | |
| (6) | | Sirimavo Bandaranaike සිරිමාවෝ බණ්ඩාරනායක (1916–2000); Attanagalla | 29 May 1970 | 23 July 1977 | 7 years, 55 days | Sri Lanka Freedom Party | S. Bandaranaike II | Self | |
Minister of Foreign Affairs
| 7 | | Abdul Cader Shahul Hameed අබ්දුල් කාදර් ෂාහුල් හමීඩ් (1927–1999); Harispattuwa | 23 July 1977 | 2 January 1989 | 11 years, 206 days | United National Party | Jayewardene | J. R. Jayewardene | |
| 7 | | Abdul Cader Shahul Hameed අබ්දුල් කාදර් ෂාහුල් හමීඩ් (1927–1999); Harispattuwa | 2 January 1989 | 14 February 1989 | 11 years, 206 days | United National Party | Premadasa | Ranasinghe Premadasa | |
| 8 | | General; Ranjan Wijeratne රන්ජන් විජේරත්න (1931–1991); National List | 18 February 1989 | 28 March 1990 | 1 year, 38 days | United National Party | Premadasa | Ranasinghe Premadasa | |
| 9 | | Harold Herath හැරල්ඩ් හේරත් (1930–2007); Puttalam | 30 March 1990 | 1 May 1993 | 3 years, 135 days | United National Party | Premadasa | Ranasinghe Premadasa | |
| 9 | | Harold Herath හැරල්ඩ් හේරත් (1930–2007); Puttalam | 1 May 1993 | 12 August 1993 | 3 years, 135 days | United National Party | Wijetunga | Dingiri Banda Wijetunga | |
| (7) | | Abdul Cader Shahul Hameed අබ්දුල් කාදර් ෂාහුල් හමීඩ් (1927–1999); Kandy | 12 August 1993 | 15 August 1994 | 1 year, 3 days | United National Party | Wijetunga | Dingiri Banda Wijetunga | |
| 10 | | Sri Lankabhimanya; Lakshman Kadirgamar ලක්ෂ්මන් කදිර්ගාමර් (1932–2005); National List | 19 August 1994 | 12 November 1994 | 7 years, 52 days | Sri Lanka Freedom Party | Wijetunga | Dingiri Banda Wijetunga | |
| 10 | | Sri Lankabhimanya; Lakshman Kadirgamar ලක්ෂ්මන් කදිර්ගාමර් (1932–2005); National List | 12 November 1994 | 10 October 2001 | 7 years, 52 days | Sri Lanka Freedom Party | Kumaratunga | Chandrika Kumaratunga | |
| 11 | | Tyronne Fernando ටිරොන් ෆර්නැන්ඩො (1941–2008); Colombo | 12 December 2001 | 7 February 2004 | 2 years, 57 days | United National Party | Kumaratunga | Chandrika Kumaratunga | |
| (10) | | Sri Lankabhimanya; Lakshman Kadirgamar ලක්ෂ්මන් කදිර්ගාමර් (1932–2005); National List | 10 April 2004 | 12 August 2005^{[†]} | 1 year, 124 days | Sri Lanka Freedom Party | Kumaratunga | Chandrika Kumaratunga | |
| 12 | | Anura Bandaranaike අනුර බණ්ඩාරනායක (1949–2008); Gampaha | 23 August 2005 | 22 November 2005 | 91 days | Sri Lanka Freedom Party | Kumaratunga | Chandrika Kumaratunga | |
| 13 | | Mangala Samaraweera මංගල සමරවීර (1956–2021); Matara | 23 November 2005 | 27 January 2007 | 1 year, 65 days | Sri Lanka Freedom Party | M. Rajapaksa | Mahinda Rajapaksa | |
| 14 | | Rohitha Bogollagama රෝහිත බෝගොල්ලාගම (born 1954); Kurunegala | 28 January 2007 | 9 April 2010 | 3 years, 71 days | Sri Lanka Freedom Party | M. Rajapaksa | Mahinda Rajapaksa | |
| 15 | | G. L. Peiris ගාමිණී ලක්ශ්මන් පීරිස් (born 1946); National List | 23 April 2010 | 12 January 2015 | 4 years, 264 days | Sri Lanka Freedom Party | M. Rajapaksa | Mahinda Rajapaksa | |
| (13) | | Mangala Samaraweera මංගල සමරවීර (1956–2021); Matara | 12 January 2015 | 22 May 2017 | 2 years, 130 days | United National Party | Sirisena I | Maithripala Sirisena | |
| (13) | | Mangala Samaraweera මංගල සමරවීර (1956–2021); Matara | 12 January 2015 | 22 May 2017 | 2 years, 130 days | United National Party | Sirisena II | Maithripala Sirisena | |
| 16 | | Ravi Karunanayake රවී කරුණානායක (born 1963); Colombo | 22 May 2017 | 10 August 2017 | 80 days | United National Party | Sirisena II | Maithripala Sirisena | |
| – | | Vasantha Senanayake වසන්ත සේනානායක (born 1973); Polonnaruwa | 10 August 2017 | 15 August 2017 | 5 days | United National Party | Sirisena II | Maithripala Sirisena | |
| 17 | | Tilak Marapana තිලක් මාරපන (born 1942); National List | 15 August 2017 | 26 October 2018 | 1 year, 72 days | United National Party | Sirisena II | Maithripala Sirisena | |
| 18 | | Sarath Amunugama සරත් ලීලානන්ද බණඩාර අමුනුගම (born 1939); National List | 29 October 2018 | 15 December 2018 | 47 days | Sri Lanka Freedom Party | Sirisena III | Maithripala Sirisena | |
| (17) | | Tilak Marapana තිලක් මාරපන (born 1942); National List | 20 December 2018 | 21 November 2019 | 336 days | United National Party | Sirisena IV | Maithripala Sirisena | |
Minister of Foreign Relations
| 19 | | Dinesh Gunawardena දිනේෂ් ගුණවර්ධන (born 1949); Colombo | 22 November 2019 | 16 August 2021 | 1 year, 267 days | Mahajana Eksath Peramuna | G. Rajapaksa I | Gotabaya Rajapaksa | |
| 19 | | Dinesh Gunawardena දිනේෂ් ගුණවර්ධන (born 1949); Colombo | 22 November 2019 | 16 August 2021 | 1 year, 267 days | Mahajana Eksath Peramuna | G. Rajapaksa II | Gotabaya Rajapaksa | |
| (15) | | G. L. Peiris ගාමිණී ලක්ශ්මන් පීරිස් (born 1946); National List | 16 August 2021 | 21 July 2022 | 339 days | Sri Lanka Podujana Peramuna | G. Rajapaksa II | Gotabaya Rajapaksa | |
| (15) | | G. L. Peiris ගාමිණී ලක්ශ්මන් පීරිස් (born 1946); National List | 16 August 2021 | 21 July 2022 | 339 days | Sri Lanka Podujana Peramuna | G. Rajapaksa III | Gotabaya Rajapaksa | |
| (15) | | G. L. Peiris ගාමිණී ලක්ශ්මන් පීරිස් (born 1946); National List | 16 August 2021 | 21 July 2022 | 339 days | Sri Lanka Podujana Peramuna | G. Rajapaksa IV | Gotabaya Rajapaksa | |
Minister of Foreign Affairs
| 20 | | Ali Sabry අලි සබ්රි (born 1970); National List | 22 July 2022 | 23 September 2024 | 2 years, 63 days | Sri Lanka Podujana Peramuna | Wickremesinghe | Ranil Wickremesinghe | |
| 21 | | Vijitha Herath විජිත හේරත් (born 1970); Gampaha | 25 September 2024 | Present | 1 year, 347 days | National People's Power | Dissanayake I | Anura Kumara Dissanayake | |
| 21 | | Vijitha Herath විජිත හේරත් (born 1970); Gampaha | 25 September 2024 | Present | 1 year, 347 days | National People's Power | Dissanayake II | Anura Kumara Dissanayake | |

== See also ==
- Ministry of Foreign Affairs
- Ministry of External Affairs and Defence
