= Abeywardena =

Abeywardena is a Sinhalese surname. Notable people with the surname include:

- Lakshman Yapa Abeywardena (born 1955), Sri Lankan politician
- Mahinda Yapa Abeywardena (born 1945), Sri Lankan politician
- Vajira Abeywardena (born 1960), Sri Lankan politician
