= Dushmantha =

Dushmantha is a given name. Notable people with the name include:

- Dushmantha Chameera (born 1992), Sri Lankan cricketer
- Dushmantha Mithrapala (fl. 2015), Sri Lankan politician
