= Minister of Youth Affairs and Sports =

Minister of Youth Affairs and Sports may refer to:

- Minister of Youth Affairs and Sports (France)
- Minister of Youth Affairs and Sports (India)
- Minister of Youth Affairs and Sports (Sri Lanka)
