= Mithrapala =

Mithrapala is a surname. Notable people with the surname include:

- Dushmantha Mithrapala (fl. 2015), Sri Lankan politician
- H. R. Mithrapala (1946–2019), Sri Lankan politician
