= Palitha Thewarapperuma =

Sri Lankan politician (1960–2024)

The Honourable Palitha Thewarapperuma
- පාලිත තෙවරප්පෙරුම
- Thewarapperuma in 2020

Deputy Minister of Social Empowerment
- In office 21 December 2018 – 21 November 2019
- President: Maithripala Sirisena
- Prime Minister: Ranil Wickremesinghe
- Minister: Daya Gamage
- Preceded by: Ranjan Ramanayake
- Succeeded by: Vacant

Deputy Minister of Sustainable Development, Wildlife and Regional Development
- In office 2 May 2018 – 26 October 2018
- President: Maithripala Sirisena
- Prime Minister: Ranil Wickremesinghe
- Minister: Sarath Fonseka
- Preceded by: Sumedha G. Jayasena
- Succeeded by: Ananda Aluthgamage

Deputy Minister of Internal Affairs, Wayamba Development and Cultural Affairs
- In office 6 April 2016 – 2 May 2018
- President: Maithripala Sirisena
- Prime Minister: Ranil Wickremesinghe
- Minister: S. B. Nawinne
- Preceded by: Harsha de Silva
- Succeeded by: Edward Gunasekara

Member of Parliament for Kalutara District
- In office 22 April 2010 – 3 March 2020

Personal details
- Born: 3 May 1960 Ceylon
- Died: 16 April 2024 (aged 63) Kalutara, Sri Lanka
- Party: United National Party
- Education: Ananda Sastralaya, Matugama
- Occupation: Politician

Palitha Kumara Thewarapperuma (Sinhala: පාලිත තෙවරප්පෙරුම, Tamil: பாலித்த தெவரப்பெரும; 3 May 1960 – 16 April 2024) was a Sri Lankan politician who served as a United National Party member of the Parliament of Sri Lanka for the Kalutara District between 2010 and 2020. He served as the Deputy Minister of Social Empowerment, Deputy Minister of Sustainable Development, Wildlife and Regional Development and Deputy Minister of Internal Affairs, Wayamba Development and Cultural Affairs during the Presidency of Maithripala Sirisena.

== Early life and education ==
Thewarapperuma was born on 3 May 1960 in Sri Lanka (then known as Ceylon). He received his primary education at Ananda Sastralaya National School in Matugama.

== Political career ==
Thewarapperuma embarked on his political career with the Lanka Sama Samaja Party, serving on the staff of Anil Moonesinghe. Later, he moved to the United National Party, initially engaging in local governance activities. His foray into the political arena commenced with his candidacy for the Matugama Divisional Council, ultimately culminating in his appointment as the council's chairman in 2002. Subsequently, he contested the provincial council elections for the Western Province, representing the Kalutara District, where he secured electoral victory.

He was first elected to Parliament in 2010, and was subsequently re-elected in 2015. As a part of the UNP-led Good Governance administration headed by President Maithripala Sirisena in 2015, Thewarapperuma assumed significant ministerial responsibilities. These included roles such as Deputy Minister of Sustainable Development, Wildlife, and Regional Development, as well as Deputy Minister of Internal Affairs, Wayamba Development, and Cultural Affairs.

In the wake of a constitutional crisis in 2018, Thewarapperuma and his cohorts faced temporary removal from their governmental positions under the brief the short-lived Sirisena-Rajapaksa-led government. However, subsequent no-confidence motions and judicial interventions resulted in their reinstatement. Following this episode, Thewarapperuma undertook new duties upon his swearing-in as Deputy Minister of Social Empowerment.

Nonetheless, by 2019, he was compelled to resign once more, prompted by the transition to a Sri Lanka Podujana Peramuna (SLPP)-led government following Gotabaya Rajapaksa's election as president. Despite his efforts to contest the 2020 Parliamentary elections, the UNP suffered unprecedented defeat, leading to his electoral loss.

Thewarapperuma was popular amongst the local masses for his social service activities and philanthropy. He rose to fame among people of the entire island especially during the COVID-19 pandemic in Sri Lanka for having provided food, dry rations and other necessities to the rural population of the Kalutara Electoral District.

== Controversies and incidents ==
Thewarapperuma was suspended from parliament for a week in 2016 for a brawl. He was part of the brawl on 15 November 2018, and had a blunt knife in hand which he appeared to want to use but was held back by fellow UNP MPs.

In July 2016, Theewarapperuma went on a hunger strike demanding authorities admit nine children into a public school. During the events, he attempted suicide by hanging himself. However, he was admitted to the hospital and underwent a bypass surgery. Following the incident, the students were admitted to grade one of the school.

During the 2020 COVID-19 pandemic, he, on several occasions, distributed food supplies to the people of the village of Atalugama, which was under lockdown due to COVID infections.

== Personal life ==
Thewarapperuma was married and had two children, Sahan Thilanka and Roshan Thilakshana. His elder son Sahan died of a sudden illness in August 2015 at the age of 23. He was a devout Buddhist.

=== Death ===
On 16 April 2024, Thewarapperuma was engaged in gardening at his private residence in Matugama when he suffered an accidental electric shock. He was transported to Nagoda Hospital in Kalutara, where he died. He was 63 years old. He had already prepared his burial plot in Kalutara.
