= Malik Samarawickrama =

Sri Lankan politician

Hon. Malik Samarawickrama
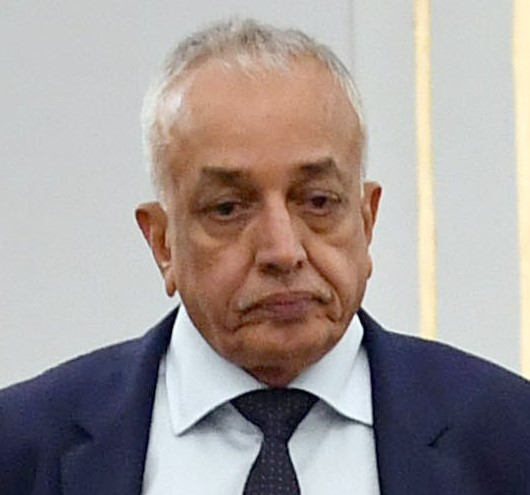
- Samarawickrama in October 2018

Minister of Development Strategies and International Trade
- In office 4 September 2015 – 17 November 2019
- President: Maithripala Sirisena
- Prime Minister: Ranil Wickremesinghe

Member of Parliament for National List
- In office 2015–2020

Personal details
- Born: 19 March 1949 (age 77)
- Party: United National Party
- Education: Royal College, Colombo
- Profession: Entrepreneur/Politician

Malik Devapriya Samarawickrama (born 19 March 1949) is a Sri Lankan entrepreneur and politician. He was appointed to Parliament as a national list member in 2015. He is a former Minister of Development Strategies and International Trade and chairman of the United National Party.

Educated at Royal College, Colombo, where played at the Bradby Shield Encounter. He also played rugby union for the Ceylonese Rugby & Football Club and represented Sri Lanka in the 1960s. He was a past president of Kandy Sports Club (rugby) and currently is the patron.

Samaraweera a close friend of Ranil Wickramasinghe was accused of going out the way from the 2015 elected Yahapalana government and playing a role on his own agendas. In November 2019, he announced his retirement from politics.
