= Ashoka Abeysinghe =

Sri Lankan politician

Hon. Ashoka Abeysinghe MP
- අශෝක අබේසිංහ அசோக அபேசிங்க

Member of Parliament for Kurunegala District
- Incumbent
- Assumed office 2010

Personal details
- Party: Samagi Jana Balawegaya
- Other political affiliations: United National Front for Good Governance United National Party
- Occupation: Businessman

Ashoka Abeysinghe is a Sri Lankan politician, a member of the Parliament of Sri Lanka. He belongs to the United National Party (UNP). He was the first mayor of Kurunegala from the Sri Lanka Freedom Party, and later joined the UNP. He was appointed the Deputy Minister of Transport and Civil Aviation after the UNP won the 2015 general elections.

In 2020, he joined the breakaway group led by opposition leader Sajith Premadasa to establish Samagi Jana Balawegaya. He was elected to parliament with that party in 2020.
