= Karu Paranawithana =

Sri Lankan politician

Hon. Karunarathna Paranawithana MP

Member of Parliament for Ratnapura District
- Incumbent
- Assumed office 3 September 2024
- Preceded by: Thalatha Atukorale
- In office 2015–2020

Deputy Minister of Ministry of Science Research Technology Vocational Training Skills Development and Kandian Heritage
- In office 9 September 2015 – ?

Personal details
- Born: June 2, 1968 (age 57)
- Party: Samagi Jana Balawegaya (since 2020); United National Party
- Other political affiliations: United National Front for Good Governance

Karunarathna Paranawithana (born 2 June 1968) is a Sri Lankan politician and current member of parliament for the Ratnapura District. He previously served as deputy minister of Provincial Council and Local Government, and as secretary to the Ministry of Mass Media, before resigning to contest the 2015 parliamentary election as a candidate of the UNP-led UNFGG alliance.

== See also ==
- List of Sri Lankan non-career Permanent Secretaries
