= Buddhika Pathirana =

Sri Lankan politician

Hon. Buddhika Pathirana MP
- බුද්ධ්ක පතිරණ புத்தர் பத்திரனா
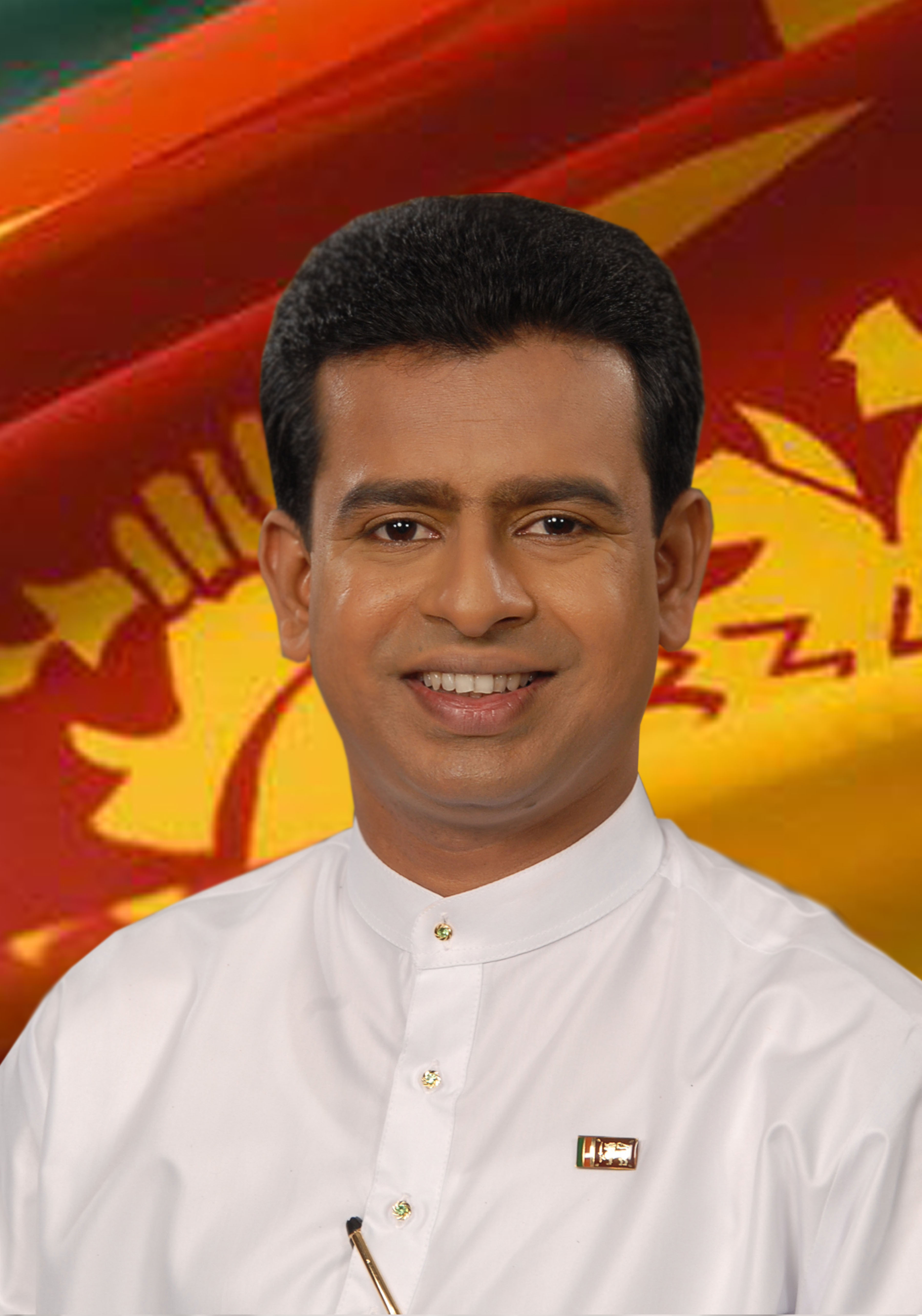

Deputy Minister of Industries and Commerce
- In office 20 June 2018 – 26 October 2018
- President: Maithripala Sirisena
- Prime Minister: Ranil Wickremesinghe
- Minister: Rishad Bathiudeen
- In office 20 December 2018 – 21 November 2019

State Minister of Industry and Commerce, Co-operative Development Vocational Training and Skills Development
- In office 09 June 2019 – 21 November 2019
- President: Maithripala Sirisena
- Prime Minister: Ranil Wickremesinghe

Member of Parliament for Matara
- Incumbent
- Assumed office 2010

Personal details
- Born: 17 March 1974 (age 52)
- Party: United National Party
- Spouse: Mihiri Warnakulasuriya
- Education: Rahula College, Matara, University of Kelaniya
- Occupation: Politician
- Website: buddhikapathirana.org

Akalanka Buddhika Uditha Dedduwa Pathirana (Sinhala: බුද්ධ්ක පතිරණ; born 17 March 1974) was a deputy minister at the Ministry of Industry and Commerce and a member of the 7th Parliament of Sri Lanka represented the United National Party (UNP), for Matara District. He was elected to the Parliament at the General Election held on 8 April 2010 winning the second highest percentage of votes from the United National Party which is the major opposition in the country.

== Education ==
Pathirana received his primary and secondary education from Rahula College, Matara (1980–1993). He was a senior school prefect, captain of the debating team and was awarded the president scout medal. He studied medicine at the University of Kelaniya (1997-2002).

== Professional career ==
Pathirana joined the Telshan Network (TNL TV) in 1995 as an assistant news co-ordinator and worked there till 1998 as a news co-ordinator, the deputy news editor and a political programme presenter. From 1998 to 2004, he served at MTV Channel (Sirasa TV) as a political programme presenter and an executive producer.

== Political career ==
After receiving 44,165 preferential votes at the Provincial Council Elections in 2004, Pathirana became a member of the Southern Provincial Council. He also became the youngest leader of the opposition in Provincial Councils in Sri Lanka when he was appointed as the leader of the opposition in Southern Provincial Council in 2009, with 57,802 votes. He entered into the 7th Parliament of Sri Lanka as a member by receiving 62,499 preferential votes from Matara District at the General Election in 2010. Pathirana is a member of 14 Consultative Committees inclusive of Ministries of Economic Development, Ports & Aviation, Fisheries & Aquatic Resources, State Defense, etc. He was awarded as the Most Outstanding Young Politician in Sri Lanka in 2006. He has been working as the Media Secretary of the UNP for Southern Province since 2004 and the Chief Organiser of the UNP in Akuressa Electorate since 2005.

== International accolades ==
Pathirana was elected as a member of the executive committee and the chief executive officer for South Asia in Young Liberals and Democrats of Asia (YLDA) in 2007 and 2008 respectively.

== Other Positions ==
Pathirana was the first chairman of the Mutuhara Children's Society (1987–1990). He was the first district secretary for youth Red Cross Society (1990–1992). He was the youngest principal of Sunday schools in Sri Lanka from 1991 to 1998. He has been the Chief Basnayaka Nilame for Matara Binara Maha Perahera since 2007. He was national chairman of Liberal Youth Guilds (LYG) in Sri Lanka (2007–2009). Pathirana is the founder, chairman and the managing director of the Samadhi Community Development Foundation, since 2000.
