= Mangala Samaraweera =

Sri Lankan politician (1956–2021)

Hon. Mangala Samaraweera
- මංගල සමරවීර மங்கள சமரவீர
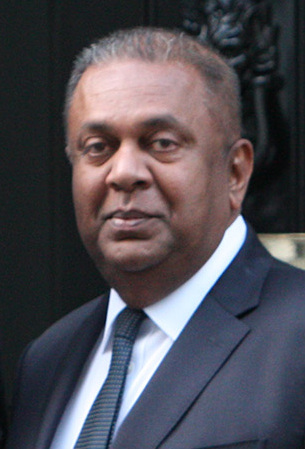
- Samaraweera in 2015

Minister of Finance
- In office 22 May 2017 – 17 November 2019
- President: Maithripala Sirisena
- Prime Minister: Ranil Wickremesinghe
- Preceded by: Ravi Karunanayake
- Succeeded by: Mahinda Rajapaksa

Minister of Media
- In office 22 May 2017 – 17 November 2019
- President: Maithripala Sirisena
- Prime Minister: Ranil Wickremesinghe
- Preceded by: Gayantha Karunathilaka

Minister of Foreign Affairs
- In office 12 January 2015 – 22 May 2017
- President: Maithripala Sirisena
- Prime Minister: Ranil Wickremesinghe
- Preceded by: Gamini L Peiris
- Succeeded by: Ravi Karunanayake
- In office 23 November 2005 – 28 January 2007
- President: Mahinda Rajapaksa
- Prime Minister: Ratnasiri Wickremanayake
- Preceded by: Anura Bandaranaike
- Succeeded by: Rohitha Bogollagama

Member of Parliament for Matara District
- In office 9 March 1989 – 3 March 2020

Personal details
- Born: 21 April 1956 Matara, Ceylon
- Died: 24 August 2021 (aged 65) Colombo, Sri Lanka
- Party: Sri Lanka Freedom Party ^{(1983–2007)} Sri Lanka Freedom Party (Mahajana) ^{(2007–2010)} United National Party^{(2010–2020)} Samagi Jana Balawegaya^{(2020)}
- Parent(s): Mahanama Samaraweera (father); Khema Padmawathi Samaraweera (mother)
- Education: Rahula College; Nalanda College, Colombo; Royal College, Colombo; Waltham Forest College, London; St. Martin's School of Art; University of Kelaniya
- Occupation: Politician

Mangala Pinsiri Samaraweera (Sinhala: මංගල පින්සිරි සමරවීර, Tamil: மங்கள சமரவீர; pronounced [mˈʌŋgɘlɘ pinsiri sˈʌmɘrɘviːrɘ] 21 April 1956 – 24 August 2021) was a Sri Lankan politician. He served as Minister of Finance from 2017 to 2019, and as the Minister of Foreign Affairs, for two terms from 2005 to 2007 and 2015 to 2017. He created a stir in Sri Lankan politics when he was sacked as a minister by President Mahinda Rajapaksa in 2007, after which he split from the Sri Lanka Freedom Party to form his own wing (Mahajana wing), which later merged with the United National Party in 2010.

Samaraweera served as a politician for over 30 years in his career until his retirement from politics in 2020. During his tenure as a politician, he was an advocate of liberalism and radical centrism and opposed militarisation, as well as ethnic and religious polarisation. He also advocated for LGBTQ rights in Sri Lanka, despite same-sex sexual activity and same-sex marriage being illegal in Sri Lanka.

== Early life and education ==
Mangala Samaraweera was born on 21 April 1956 in Matara, Sri Lanka, the son of Mahanama Samaraweera and Khema Padmawathi Amaraweera. His father was a cabinet Minister of Local Government, Housing, Communications, Posts and Telecommunications in Sirimavo Bandaranaike's government and his mother served as a member of the Matara Urban Council.

After schooling at Rahula College Matara, Nalanda College, Colombo and Royal College, Colombo, at Waltham Forest College, London he gained a BA in Clothing Design and Technology from St. Martin's School of Art in London, he served as a design consultant to the National Design Center of Sri Lanka and served as a visiting lecturer in the Institute of Aesthetic Studies, University of Kelaniya. Veteran textile designer Chandra Thneuwera invited him to join her at the Institute of Aesthetic Studies while he was working as a consultant for the Ministry of Textile Industries under the guidance of Wijayapala Mendis.

== Political career ==
Samaraweera entered politics from the Sri Lanka Freedom Party as its chief organiser in Matara in 1983. He was introduced as Khema's boy when he was appointed as SLFP's chief organiser. He later became the SLFP party's Assistant Secretary and Coordinating Secretary of the Mother's Front. He also served as human rights campaigner in the 1980s when Ranasinghe Premadasa was the president of Sri Lanka.

He first entered the Parliament of Sri Lanka as a representative of the Matara District in 1989, and he was appointed Minister of Post and Telecommunications in the cabinet of President Chandrika Bandaranaike Kumaratunga in 1994. He also served as the Minister of Urban Development, Construction and Public Utilities in the same Cabinet after a reshuffle and was later given the Deputy Minister of Finance portfolio.

Following the election defeat of his party in 2001, he was made the Chief Opposition Whip and the Treasurer of the Sri Lanka Freedom Party. In 2004 he became the Minister of Ports, Aviation and Media in the new cabinet of President Chandrika Bandaranaike Kumaratunga.

In June 2005, after conflicts with Kumaratunga, he dropped the Media Ministry, but remained Cabinet Minister of Ports and Aviation. He became the campaign manager for Presidential candidate and Prime Minister Mahinda Rajapakse. When Rajapakse won and took office in November 2005, he surprised many by appointing Samaraweera to the additional post of Foreign Minister instead of Prime Minister; Samaraweera maintained his other posts.

In late January 2007, Samaraweera was replaced as Foreign Minister, but remained as Minister of Ports and Aviation. On 9 February 2007, he was sacked from the cabinet together with ministers Anura Bandaranaike and Sripathi Sooriyarachchi after falling out with the then president Mahinda Rajapaksa. He then went on to create a new political party, the SLFP (Mahajana) wing. Mangala later became a vocal critic of Rajapaksa family and Rajapaksa government after being ousted by Mahinda Rajapaksa from his cabinet.

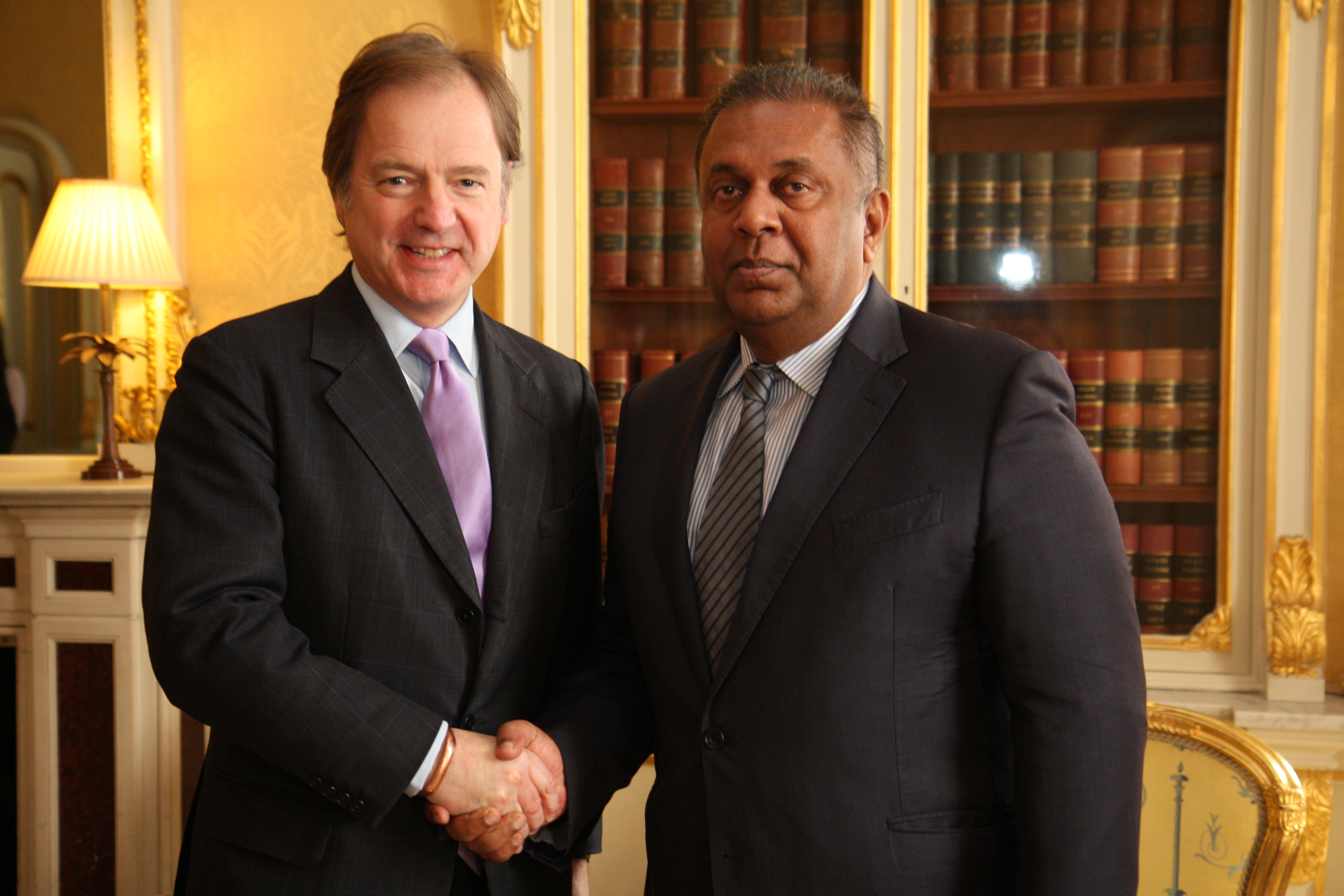
Samaraweera meets with Foreign Office Minister Hugo Swire in London on 11 March 2015

In October 2013, the Matara Magistrate's Court issued a court order to arrest him and 10 others for their alleged involvement in obstructing a peaceful protest march in Matara by UNP activists, to oust its leader Ranil Wickramasinghe.

On 12 January 2015, Samaraweera was again appointed Minister of Foreign Affairs under newly elected President Maithripala Sirisena. During the 2015 Presidential election, he played a pivotal role as a joint spokesperson of the opposition coalition candidate Maithripala Sirisena.

After the 2019 Presidential election, Samaraweera joined the newly formed Samagi Jana Balawegaya which was launched in 2020 and led by opposition leader Sajith Premadasa. Mangala was reported to have played a major role in the break up of the United National Party and also led the formation of Samagi Jana Balavegaya. He resigned from the position of Finance minister as of 17 November 2019 only hours prior to release of the general election results.

In June 2020, he announced that he would not contest the 2020 parliamentary election which was held on 5 August 2020 and urged the public not to vote for his preferential number, stating that it had become impossible by that time to get his name removed from the nomination list. On 9 June 2020, he also announced that he would step back and quit parliamentary politics.

== Controversies ==
In 2019, while being the finance minister he was accused of spreading hate speech about Buddhism due to his opposition to Sinhalese Buddhist nationalism and monks urged immediate action against him for his comments about Buddhism.

He also criticised Cardinal Malcolm Ranjith in 2018 for Ranjith's comments on human rights and, in 2019, blamed Ranjith for visiting a Buddhist monk who was fasting.

He was accused of using Sri Lanka Transport Board buses to transport and locate voters for the 2019 Presidential election during his tenure as finance minister.

== Personal life ==
He was openly homosexual. In November 2018, after homophobic comments made by President Maithripala Sirisena, he wrote on Twitter that "I would rather be a butterfly than a leech Mr. President!!!"

In May 2021, he featured in a YouTube video, "Light Upali", where he played the role of a warrior defending social media platform TikTok.

== Death ==
He died on 24 August 2021 at the age of 65 due to COVID-19. Prior to his death, he was admitted into the intensive care unit of the Lanka Hospital in Colombo after being tested positive for COVID-19 in August 2021. He was diagnosed with COVID-19 despite being fully vaccinated with both doses. Before his death was officially confirmed on 24 August 2021, rumours of his death started circulating on social media from 18 August. He was the second high-profile Sri Lankan politician to succumb to COVID-19 after W. J. M. Lokubandara.

== See also ==
- List of foreign ministers in 2017
- List of political families in Sri Lanka
- List of the first LGBT holders of political offices

Government offices
Preceded by Gamini L Peiris	Minister of Foreign Affairs of Sri Lanka; 2015–2017	Succeeded by Ravi Karunanayake
Preceded by Anura Bandaranaike	Minister of Foreign Affairs of Sri Lanka; 2005–2007	Succeeded by Rohitha Bogollagama
