= Sagala Ratnayaka =

Sri Lankan politician

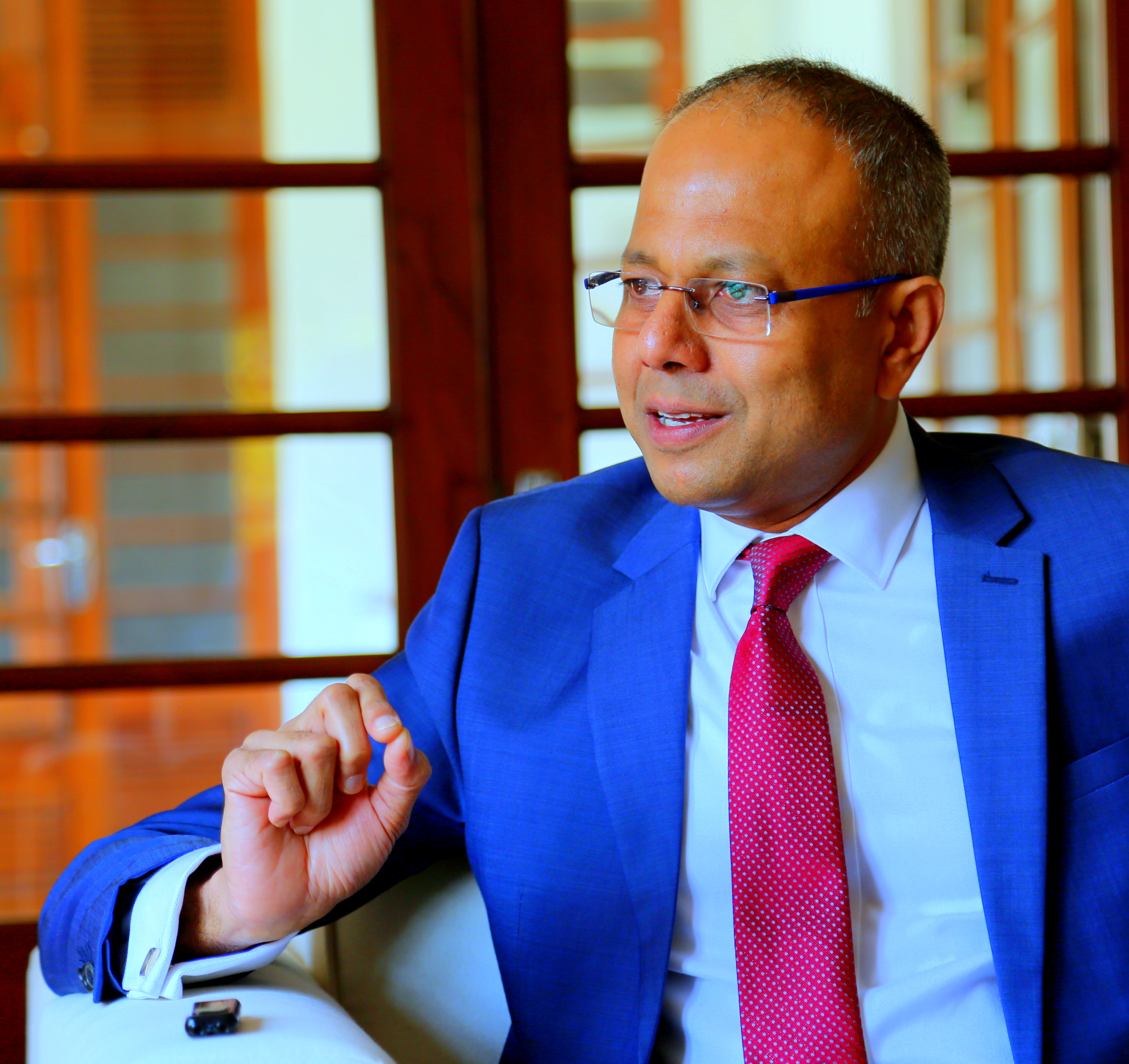

National Organsier for the United National Party
- Incumbent
- Assumed office July 2022

Chief of Staff and Senior Advisor to the President on National Security
- In office 28 July 2022 – 23 September 2024
- President: Ranil Wickremesinghe

Minister of Law and Order and Southern Development
- In office 11 November 2015 – 25 February 2018
- President: Maithripala Sirisena
- Prime Minister: Ranil Wickremesinghe
- Preceded by: Tilak Marapana
- Succeeded by: Ranil Wickramasinghe

Minister Youth Affairs and Southern Development
- In office 25 February 2018 – November 2019
- President: Maithripala Sirisena
- Prime Minister: Ranil Wickremesinghe
- Preceded by: Ranil Wickramasinghe

Member of Parliament for Matara District
- In office 26 June 2015 – 3 March 2020
- In office 10 October 2000 – 09 February 2010

Personal details
- Born: 27 February 1968 (age 58) Deniyaya
- Party: United National Party
- Education: Royal College Colombo; Lewis & Clark College
- Profession: Agriculturalist
- Website: https://sagala.lk

Sagala Gajendra Ratnayaka (born 27 February 1968) is a Sri Lankan politician who is the National Organiser for United National Party in Sri Lanka. He had been serving as the chief of staff to the President of Sri Lanka and National Security Advisor from 2022 to 2024. He had served as the Cabinet Minister of Law and Order and Southern Development (2015-2018); Youth Affairs and Southern Development (2019-2019); Chief of Staff to the Prime Minister of Sri Lanka and Member of Parliament for Matara District.

== Early life and education ==
Ratnayaka was born to a political family from Deniyaya, where his uncle Victor Ratnayake, MBE was a notable legislator. He was educated at the Royal College Colombo, where he became the Head Prefect. He proceeded to study in the United States and graduated from Lewis & Clark College with a bachelor's degree in business administration studies in 1993.

== Early career ==
After graduating he worked as a financial analyst at Central Finance Company and joined HSBC Sri Lanka going on to become a credit operations manager.

== Political career ==
He entered politics in 1999, having been elected as a member of the Southern Provincial Council. In 2000, he was elected to parliament from the Matara District. He served as Deputy Minister of Power and Energy from 2002 to 2004. Having been re-elected in 2010 and 2015. From January 2015 to September 2015 he served as the chief of staff to the prime minister until he was elected to parliament in 2015 and appointed as a Cabinet minister of Law and Order in the Good Governance Government. He served as a Cabinet minister till 2019 when he resigned from his portfolio, serving as an opposition member of parliament till 2020. In July 2022, he was appointed by President Ranil Wickremesinghe as his chief of staff and senior adviser to the president on national security.

=== National Security Advisor ===
Sri Lanka officially does not have a role for a national security advisor. However, President Ranil Wickremasinghe in 2022 appointed Ratnayaka as a Presidential Advisor on National Security. The President's Media Unit of the Presidential Secretariat and several other government departments stylised as NSA, as did the White House. The NSA does not hold an ex-officio seat in the National Security Council as it is not a codified position.

== See also ==
- List of political families in Sri Lanka
