= Harsha de Silva =

Sri Lankan politician

Hon. Harsha de Silva MP
- හර්ෂ ද සිල්වා ஹர்ஷ டி சில்வா
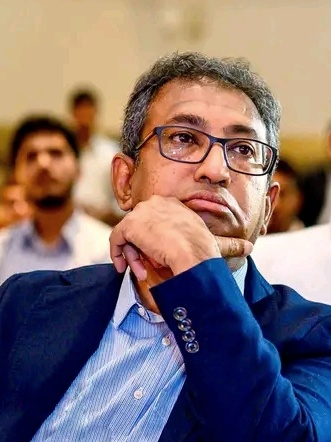
- de Silva in 2025

Member of Parliament for Colombo District
- Incumbent
- Assumed office 1 September 2015
- Majority: 82,845 Preferential Votes

Minister of Economic Reforms and Public Distribution
- In office 21 December 2018 – 18 November 2019
- President: Maithripala Sirisena
- Prime Minister: Ranil Wickremesinghe

State Minister of National Policies and Economic Affairs
- In office 10 February 2018 – 26 October 2018
- President: Maithripala Sirisena
- Prime Minister: Ranil Wickremesinghe

Deputy Minister of Foreign Affairs
- In office 9 September 2015 – 31 May 2017
- President: Maithripala Sirisena
- Prime Minister: Ranil Wickremesinghe

Member of Parliament for National List
- In office 22 April 2010 – 26 June 2015

Personal details
- Born: 30 August 1964 (age 62)
- Party: Samagi Jana Balawegaya from 2020
- Other political affiliations: United National Party until 2020
- Relations: M. W. H. de Silva (Great Uncle)
- Occupation: Politician
- Profession: Economist

Harsha de Silva (Sinhala: හර්ෂ ද සිල්වා born 30 August 1964) is a Sri Lankan economist and politician. He is a Member of Parliament for the Colombo District and former Non-Cabinet Minister of Economic Reforms and Public Distribution; State Minister of National Policies and Economic Affairs; and Deputy Minister of Foreign Affairs. He is a member of Samagi Jana Balawegaya.

== Early life ==
He was educated at Royal College Colombo, earning a BS in Business Management from Truman State University(formerly Northeast Missouri State University) in 1988. He completed his MA and PhD in Economics at the University of Missouri in 1993. He participated in an executive program on evaluating social programs at the Massachusetts Institute of Technology in 2006 as an Eisenhower Fellow.

== Banking career ==
As an economist he worked for the DFCC Bank, becoming its chief economist and treasurer. He was co-founder and Joint Managing Director of The Nielsen Company.

He was placed in charge of "Economic Diplomacy" of the government and was a supporter of economic liberalization and trade agreements. He is a supporter of major trade agreements and is a supporter of Sri Lanka joining the Trans Pacific Partnership.

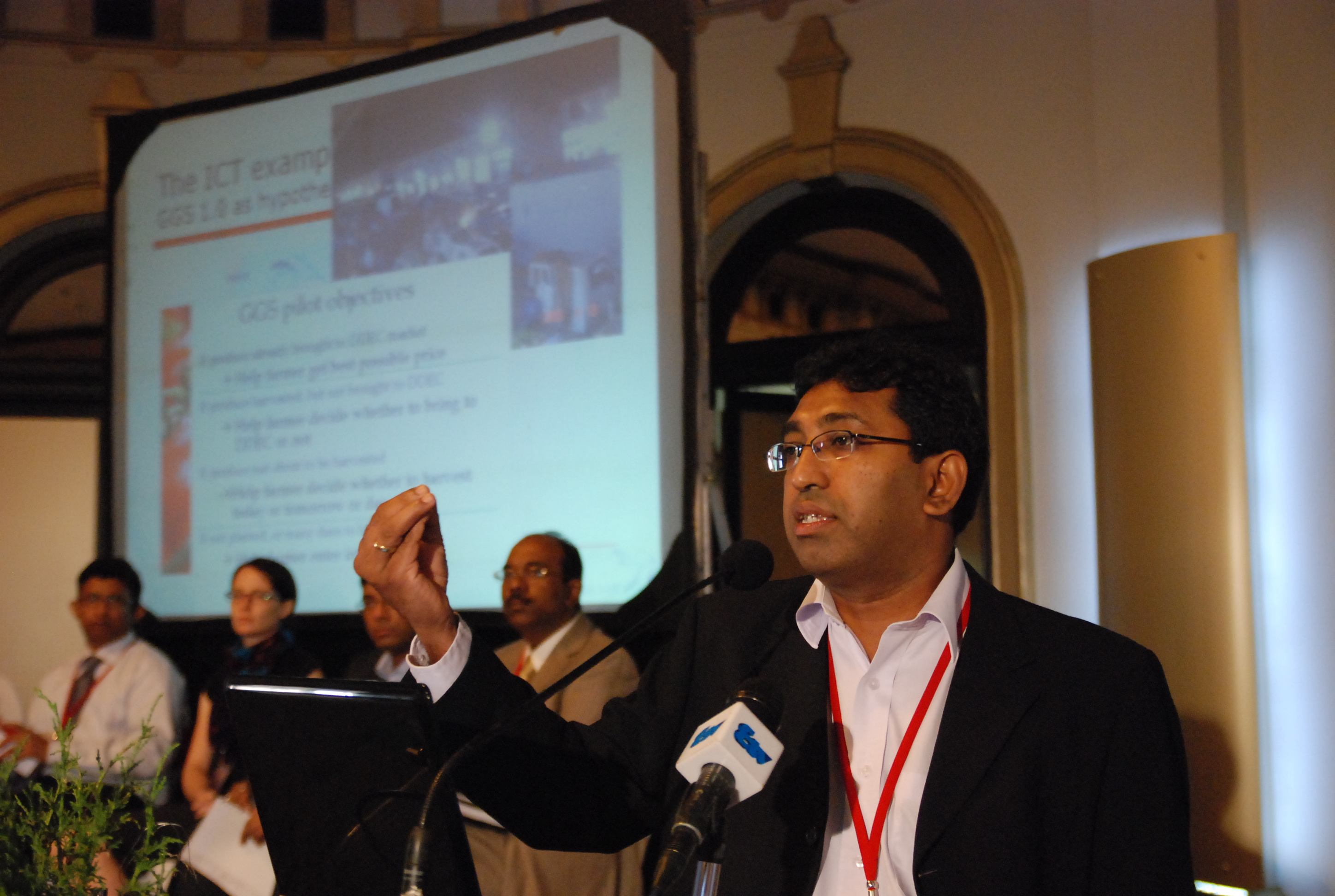

He was the main backer of the Indian-aided project to create a modern EMT and Ambulance service in Sri Lanka. When India offered a gift to Sri Lanka in order to mark Prime Minister Ranil Wickremesinghe's visit, De Silva proposed an emergency medical service after personal experiences with shortcomings in the Sri Lankan system as well the urging of doctors. Wickremesinghe also backed it, leading India's GVK Emergency Response Institute to offer training to hundreds of Sri Lankan EMTs and Paramedics as well as donating ambulances and granting 7.5 million dollars to start the service in Colombo and Galle.

== Political career ==
=== United National Party ===
De Silva was appointed as a National List Member of Parliament on 22 April 2010, serving until 26 June 2015. During this period, he served in the opposition, critiquing the economic policies of the Mahinda Rajapaksa administration. He became known for his commentary on economic development and international affairs through media appearances and public discussions.

=== Government (2015-2019) ===
In the 2015 Sri Lankan parliamentary election, de Silva contested under the UNP and was elected as MP for the Colombo District with 114,148 preferential votes on 17 August. He served in the National Unity Government under Maithripala Sirisena and Ranil Wickremesinghe. Key appointments included:

- Deputy Minister of Policy Planning and Economic Development (2015), contributing to the government's initial 100-day program.
- Deputy Minister of Foreign Affairs (9 September 2015 – 31 May 2017), overseeing international economic diplomacy.
- State Minister of National Policies and Economic Affairs (10 February 2018 – 26 October 2018), supervising economic policy initiatives.
- Minister of Economic Reforms and Public Distribution (21 December 2018 – 18 November 2019), advocating trade liberalisation and integration into international economic frameworks.

A notable achievement was the launch of the Suwa Seriya 1990 national ambulance service in 2016, an India-supported initiative providing free emergency medical transport nationwide. De Silva secured funding, training, and ambulance deployment in Colombo and Galle.

=== Samagi Jana Balawegaya ===
In March 2020, de Silva joined the Samagi Jana Balawegaya, a UNP splinter party led by Sajith Premadasa. He was re-elected as MP for Colombo District in the 2020 Sri Lankan parliamentary election.

During this period:

- Served as Chairman of the Committee on Public Finance, with intermittent reappointments in 2023 and 2024.
- Participated in the Ministerial Consultative Committee on Finance, Economic Stabilisation and National Policies from March 2024.
- Raised concerns regarding irregularities in cigarette taxation policies in 2023.

=== 2024–present ===
De Silva continued as an SJB MP for Colombo District in the 10th Parliament of Sri Lanka convened on 15 November 2024. He was reappointed Chairman of COPF on 18 December 2024, overseeing the Mid-Year Fiscal Position Report 2024 and the National Audit Office (Sri Lanka)’s Annual Work Programme for 2025. In August 2025, he criticised the Government of Sri Lanka over misrepresentation of his comments on India–Sri Lanka relations, highlighting concerns over a smear campaign against opposition voices.

== Electoral history ==
Parliamentary Elections
Year	Constituency	Position	Party	Alliance	Votes	%	+/-	Result
2015	Colombo District	Member of Parliament	United National Party	UNF for Good Governance	114,148	15.85%	15.85	Elected
2020	Colombo District	Member of Parliament	Samagi Jana Balawegaya	Samagi Jana Sandhanaya	82,845	19.63%	▲3.78	Elected
2024	Colombo District	Member of Parliament	Samagi Jana Balawegaya	Samagi Jana Sandhanaya	81,473	29.41%	▲9.78	Elected
