= J. C. Alawathuwala =

Sri Lankan politician

Hon. J. C. Alawathuwala MP
- ජේසී අලවතුවල ஜே சி அலவத்துவல

Kurunegala District
- Incumbent
- Assumed office 2020

Personal details
- Party: Samagi Jana Balawegaya

J. C. Alawathuwalaa is a Sri Lankan politician and a member of the Sri Lankan parliament from Kurunegala Electoral District as a member of the Samagi Jana Balawegaya.
