= Ministry of Internal Affairs, Wayamba Development and Cultural Affairs =

Government ministry of Sri Lanka

Ministry overview
- Jurisdiction: Government of Sri Lanka
- Headquarters: 8th Floor, Sethsiripaya, Battaramulla, Colombo; 6°54′12.60″N 79°54′55.60″E
- Annual budget: Rs. 3 billion (2016, recurrent); Rs. 3 billion (2016, capital)
- Minister responsible: S. B. Nawinne, Minister of Internal Affairs, Wayamba Development and Cultural Affairs
- Deputy Minister responsible: Palitha Thewarapperuma, Deputy Minister of Internal Affairs, Wayamba Development and Cultural Affairs
- Ministry executive: D. Swarnapala, Secretary
- Child agencies: Department of Cultural Affairs; Department of Immigration and Emigration; Department of National Museum; Department of Registration of Persons
- Website: cultural.gov.lk

The Ministry of Internal Affairs, Wayamba Development and Cultural Affairs is the central government ministry of Sri Lanka responsible for internal affairs, development of Wayamba and culture. The ministry is responsible for formulating and implementing national policy on internal affairs, Waymba development and cultural affairs and other subjects which come under its purview. The current Minister of Internal Affairs, Wayamba Development and Cultural Affairs and Deputy Minister of Internal Affairs, Wayamba Development and Cultural Affairs are S. B. Nawinne and Palitha Thewarapperuma respectively. The ministry's secretary is D. Swarnapala.

== Ministers ==
The Minister of Internal Affairs, Wayamba Development and Cultural Affairs is a member of the Cabinet of Sri Lanka.

Ministers of Culture
Name	Portrait	Party	Took office	Left office	Head of government	Ministerial title	Refs
Jayaweera Kuruppu		Sri Lanka Freedom Party			S. W. R. D. Bandaranaike	Minister of Local Government and Cultural Affairs	
P. B. G. Kalugalla		Sri Lanka Freedom Party	9 June 1959		S. W. R. D. Bandaranaike	Minister of Cultural Affairs and Social Services	
P. B. G. Kalugalla		Sri Lanka Freedom Party		8 December 1959	W. Dahanayake	Minister of Cultural Affairs and Social Services	
Bernard Aluwihare		United National Party	23 March 1960	1960	Dudley Senanayake	Minister of Education and Cultural Affairs	
Maithripala Senanayake		Sri Lanka Freedom Party	23 July 1960		Sirimavo Bandaranaike	Minister of Industries, Home and Cultural Affairs	
P. B. G. Kalugalla		Sri Lanka Freedom Party	28 May 1963		Sirimavo Bandaranaike	Minister of Education and Cultural Affairs	
I. M. R. A. Iriyagolla		United National Party	March 1965		Dudley Senanayake	Minister of Education and Cultural Affairs	
T. B. Tennekoon					Sirimavo Bandaranaike	Minister of Cultural Affairs	
E. L. B. Hurulle		United National Party	23 July 1977		J. R. Jayewardene	Minister of Cultural Affairs	
W. J. M. Lokubandara		United National Party	18 February 1989	28 March 1990	Ranasinghe Premadasa	Minister of Education, Cultural Affairs and Information	
W. J. M. Lokubandara		United National Party	30 March 1990		Ranasinghe Premadasa	Minister of Cultural Affairs and Information	
W. J. M. Lokubandara		United National Party		August 1993	D. B. Wijetunga	Minister of Cultural Affairs and Information	
Lakshman Jayakody		Sri Lanka Freedom Party	19 August 1994		D. B. Wijetunga	Minister of Cultural and Religious Affairs	
Monty Gopallawa		Sri Lanka Freedom Party	19 October 2000		Chandrika Kumaratunga	Minister of Cultural Affairs	
Mahinda Yapa Abeywardena		Sri Lanka Freedom Party	25 July 2005		Chandrika Kumaratunga	Minister of Cultural Affairs and National Heritage	
Mahinda Yapa Abeywardena		Sri Lanka Freedom Party	28 January 2007		Mahinda Rajapaksa	Minister of Cultural Affairs	
Pavithra Devi Wanniarachchi		Sri Lanka Freedom Party	23 April 2010		Mahinda Rajapaksa	Minister of National Heritage and Cultural Affairs	
T. B. Ekanayake		Sri Lanka Freedom Party	22 November 2010		Mahinda Rajapaksa	Minister of Culture and the Arts	
Ranil Wickremesinghe		United National Party	12 January 2015	17 August 2015	Maithripala Sirisena	Minister of Policy Planning, Economics Affairs, Child, Youth and Cultural Affairs	
S. B. Nawinne		United National Party	4 September 2015		Maithripala Sirisena	Minister of Internal Affairs, Wayamba Development and Cultural Affairs	

== Secretaries ==
Culture Secretaries
Name	Took office	Left office	Title	Refs
Wimal Rubasinghe	25 April 2010		National Heritage and Cultural Affairs Secretary	
Wimal Rubasinghe	22 November 2010		Culture and the Arts Secretary	
K. Liyanage	19 January 2015		Policy Planning, Economic Affairs, Child, Youth and Cultural Affairs Secretary	
D. Swarnapala	8 September 2015		Internal Affairs, Wayamba Development and Cultural Affairs Secretary	
