= Ravi Karunanayake =

Sri Lankan politician

Hon. Ravi Karunanayake MP
- රවී කරුණානායක ரவி கருணாநாயக்க
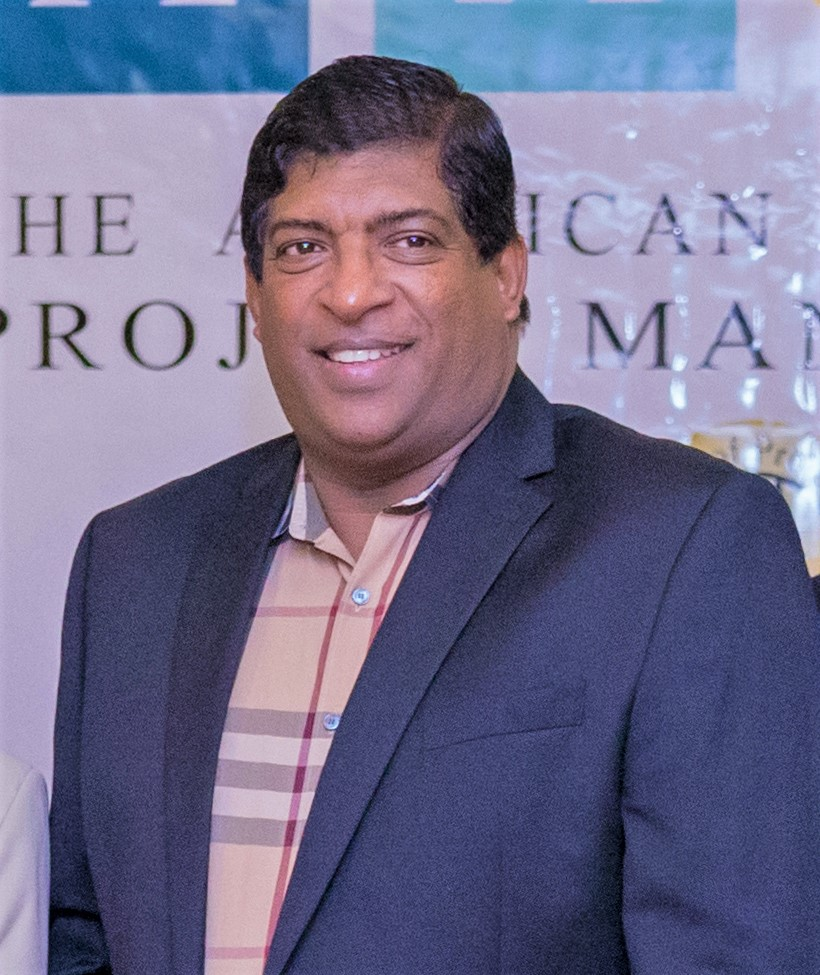
- Karunanayake in 2017

Minister of Foreign Affairs
- In office 22 May 2017 – 10 August 2017
- President: Maithripala Sirisena
- Prime Minister: Ranil Wickremesinghe
- Preceded by: Mangala Samaraweera
- Succeeded by: Tilak Marapana

Minister of Finance
- In office 12 January 2015 – 22 May 2017
- President: Maithripala Sirisena
- Prime Minister: Ranil Wickremesinghe
- Preceded by: Mahinda Rajapaksa
- Succeeded by: Mangala Samaraweera

Minister of Commerce, Consumer Affairs
- In office 12 December 2001 – 6 April 2004
- President: Chandrika Kumaratunga
- Prime Minister: Ranil Wickremesinghe

Member of Parliament for National list
- Incumbent
- Assumed office 21 November 2024

Member of Parliament for Colombo District
- In office 1994–2020

Personal details
- Born: February 19, 1963 (age 63)
- Party: United National Party (since 2000); Independent (1998–1999); Democratic United National Front (1989–1998)
- Other political affiliations: New Democratic Front (since 2024)
- Spouse: Mela
- Children: 3
- Education: Royal College, Colombo
- Occupation: Politician
- Profession: Management Accountant
- Website: Official Website

Ravindra Sandresh Karunanayake (born 19 February 1963) is a Sri Lankan politician and Member of Parliament. He served as the Minister of Foreign Affairs from May 2017 to August 2017, Minister of Finance from 2015 to 2017, and Cabinet Minister of Commerce and Consumer Affairs from 2001 to 2004 and Cabinet Minister of Power and Energy from December 2018 to November 2019.

Karunanayake is also the assistant leader of the United National Party (UNP), the District Leader of Colombo, and the chief organiser for the Colombo North Electorate.

== Early life ==
Ravindra Sandresh Karunanayake was born on 19 February 1963, the son of Tissa Anuruddha Mahanama Karunanayake and Carmaleka "Carmi" née Dissanayake, daughter of former Deputy Inspector General of Police Cyril Dissanayake. He is the eldest of two sons. His father was a planter, who died when he was 12 years old. Following the death of her husband, Carmi Karunanayake, gained employment at the Presidential Secretariat, served as head of housekeeping of the President's House, Colombo.

Educated at S. Thomas' Preparatory School, Kollupitiya up to his GCE Ordinary Level, Karunanayake then proceeded to Royal College Colombo for his Advanced Level examinations. He became a management accountant and worked for Delmege Group before starting his own freight forwarding businesses.

== Political career ==
Between 1988 and 1989, Karunanayake worked with Lalith Athulathmudali, a distant relative; in Athulathmudali's election campaign for his parliamentary seat in the Colombo District for the 1989 general elections. Athulathmudali left the United National Party and formed the Democratic United National Front, which was led by his wife Srimani Athulathmudali after his assassination in April 1993. Srimani along with the 'DUNF-Lalith Front' joined the People's Alliance under Chandrika Kumaratunga at the 1994 general elections.

=== Parliament ===
In 1994, following the general elections, two national list seats were allocated to the DUNF. Karunanayake was appointed to parliament from one of these national list seats. In 1996, Srimani was removed from the Cabinet by President Chandrika Kumaratunga, and simultaneously Srimani and her party had a dispute over the affiliation to the Government. Karunanayake was more disposed toward the UNP, and as a result Srimani fired him from the DUNF-Lalith Front. However, through a court order, Karunanayake was able to become an Independent MP in 1998-1999. With the dissolution of Parliament in 1999, he joined the UNP, and became the organiser of Kotte. He won the Kotte seat with 425,000 votes. He won the 'Young Politician of the Year' awarded by the Jaycees Colombo in the year 2000.

In the General Election held in the year 2001, Karunanayake became the Minister of Trade, Commerce and Consumer Affairs. Along with the fall of the government in the year 2004, the UNP lost the portfolio, but Karunanayake has remained a Member of Parliament.

=== Minister of Finance ===
Following the election of Maithripala Sirisena as President in 2015, he was appointed as the Minister of Finance. He presented the controversial interim budget soon thereafter.

In 2017, The Banker magazine selected Karunanayake as the best finance minister in Asia pacific for securing a $1.5 billion International Monetary Fund loan programme to avoid a balance of payments crisis, replenish reserves and rebuild confidence among international investors. Government revenue grew from Rs. 1205 in 2014 to Rs. 1,461 billion in 2015. Tax revenue rose from Rs. 1,050 billion to Rs. 1,356 billion in the same period which is crucial for Sri Lanka as it has a very low tax revenue-to-gross domestic product ratio. Sri Lanka’s tax records also grew from having 700,000 files in January 2015 to having 1.4 million.

=== Minister of Foreign Affairs ===
In May 2017 Karunanayake was removed from the post of Finance Minister and appointed as Minister of Foreign Affrairs with the Ministerial subject of the Lotteries Board by President Maithripala Sirisena. He resigned from the post of Minister of Foreign Affrairs on 10 August 2017.

==== Penthouse Affair ====
In late July 2017, during the Presidential Commission of Inquiry on Bond Issuance appointed to look into the controversial sale of government bonds during the tenure of Central Bank Governor Arjuna Mahendran to his son-in-law Arjun Aloysius's firm Perpetual Treasuries; a witness, Anika Wijesuriya, stated that the upscale Colombo penthouse rented by Minister Karunanayake and his family in 2016 was paid for by Arjun Aloysius through his company. Karunanayake was summoned to testify before the Commission, and stated that he had no knowledge of how his rent was paid. This caused a major public outcry, with calls for his resignation and negative feedback to many of the proposals he presented to President Sirisena, such as his request for the use of Visumpaya as his official residence as Minister of Foreign Affairs. Many within the government, both SLFP and UNP members as well as the President, wanted Karunanayake to resign. He resigned from the post of Minister of Foreign Affrairs on 10 August 2017.

In October 2017, Anika Wijesuriya, who testified against Ravi Karunanayake, had left Sri Lanka following threats to her life. In January 2018, a Special Committee of the United National Party, headed by Tilak Marapana, recommended that Karunanayake should be removed from his post as Assistant Leader of the party.

=== Minister of Power, Energy and Business Development ===
Following the 2018 Sri Lankan constitutional crisis, Karunanayake was appointed as Minister of Power, Energy and Business Development in December 2018. In March 2019, the country faced a major electric power crises with the Ceylon Electricity Board imposing power cuts. He resigned following the election of President Gotabaya Rajapaksa in November 2019.

=== 2020 defeat ===
He contested the 2020 Sri Lankan parliamentary election from the United National Party from Colombo, but failed to secure a seat in parliament following the break away of the Samagi Jana Balawegaya and the landslide victory of the Sri Lanka Podujana Peramuna.

== Policy commentary and advocacy ==
In July 2025, Ravi Karunanayake publicly expressed concern over recent shifts in Sri Lanka’s Renewable energy policy. He criticized the government's decision to reduce feed-in tariffs for solar and wind energy producers and to withdraw tax concessions for the importation of batteries used in energy storage. Karunanayake warned that these policy reversals would undermine the country's progress in the renewable energy sector and discourage both local and foreign investment.

He argued that such abrupt changes negatively impact the confidence of independent power producers and financial institutions, many of whom have invested in clean energy infrastructure based on previously guaranteed tariffs and incentives. According to Karunanayake, the removal of fiscal incentives for battery imports would further reduce the viability of grid-scale storage solutions, which are critical for managing intermittency in solar and wind power generation.

He emphasized that without consistent and transparent policy frameworks, Sri Lanka risked falling short of its national target to generate 70 percent of electricity from renewable sources by 2030. Karunanayake called on the government to reintroduce investor-friendly tariffs, reestablish concessions on storage infrastructure, and implement long-term energy pricing mechanisms to restore stability and ensure energy security.

== Controversy ==
On 31 August 2026, Karunanayake was arrested by the Commission to Investigate Allegations of Bribery or Corruption (CIABOC) over allegations of corruption and causing a loss to the government. He was subsequently released on bail by the Colombo Magistrate's Court.

== Family ==
Karunanayake is married to Mela and has three daughters Onella, Shenella and Minella.
