= Ministry of National Languages and Social Integration =

Government ministry of Sri Lanka

Ministry of National Co-existence Dialogue and Official Languages
- ජාතික සහජීවනය, සංවාද හා රාජ්‍ය භාෂා අමාත්‍යාංශය தேசிய சகவாழ்வு, கலந்துரையாடல் மற்றும் அரசகரும மொழிகள் அமைச்சு

Ministry overview
- Jurisdiction: Democratic Socialist Republic of Sri Lanka
- Headquarters: 40 Buthgamuwa road, Rajagiriya; 6.909775°N 79.899831°E
- Minister responsible: Mano Ganesan, Minister of National Co-existence Dialogue and Official Languages
- Ministry executive: W.M.P.G. Wickramasinghe, Ministry Secretary
- Child agencies: Department of Official Languages; Official Languages Commission; National Institute of Language Education and Training; National Secretariat for Non-Governmental Organizations
- Website: www.mncdol.gov.lk

The Ministry of National Co-existence Dialogue and Official Languages (formerly the Ministry of National Languages and Social Integration) (Sinhala: ජාතික සහජීවනය, සංවාද හා රාජ්‍ය භාෂා අමාත්‍යාංශය Jāthika Sahajeewanaya, Sangwāda hā Rājya Bhāsha Amathyanshaya; Tamil: தேசிய சகவாழ்வு, கலந்துரையாடல் மற்றும் அரசகரும மொழிகள் அமைச்சு) is a cabinet ministry of the Government of Sri Lanka responsible for the Sri Lankan government ministry responsible for formulating and implementing policy for communal coexistence by way of official and national languages and creating a national dialogue.

== List of ministers ==
Minister of National Co-existence Dialogue and Official Languages
- Incumbent; Mano Ganesan since 4 September 2015
- Nominator: Prime Minister of Sri Lanka
- Appointer: President of Sri Lanka
- Website: www.mncdol.gov.lk

Parties

Sri Lanka Freedom Party United National Party Democratic Left Front Democratic People's Front

Name	Portrait	Party	Tenure	President	Ministerial title
Vasudeva Nanayakkara		Democratic Left Front	22 November 2010 – 12 January 2015	Mahinda Rajapaksa	Minister of National Languages and Social Integration
Mano Ganesan		Democratic People's Front	4 September 2015 – present	Maithripala Sirisena	Minister of National Co-existence Dialogue and Official Languages

== See also ==
- Culture of Sri Lanka
- Demographics of Sri Lanka
- Languages of Sri Lanka
- List of ministries of Sri Lanka
