= Vasantha Senanayake =

Sri Lankan politician (born 1973)

Hon. Vasantha Senanayake
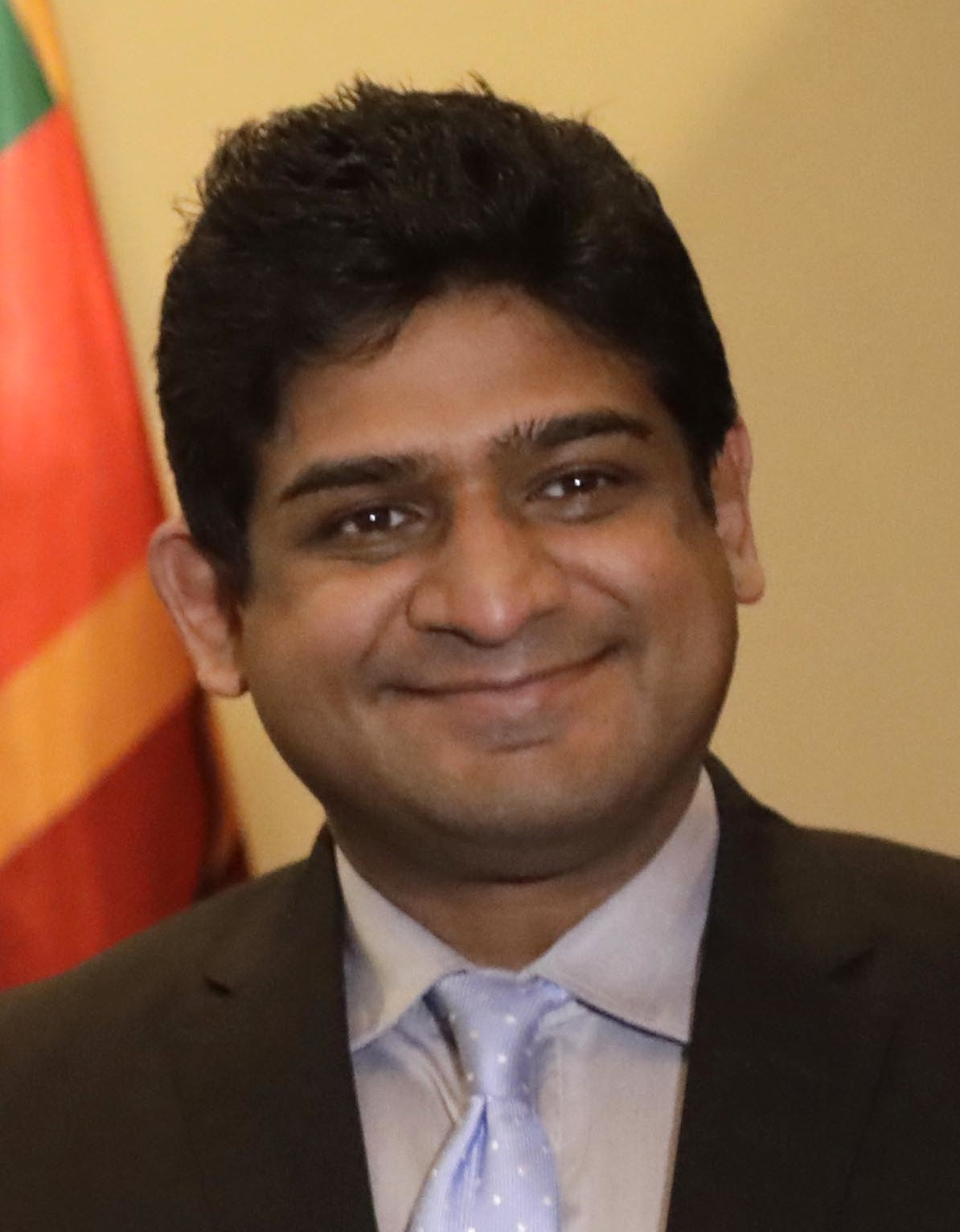

Member of Parliament for Polonnaruwa District
- In office 1 September 2015 – 3 March 2020

State Minister of Foreign Affairs
- In office 29 May 2019 – 10 October 2019
- President: Maithripala Sirisena
- Prime Minister: Ranil Wickremesinghe

Minister of Tourism and Wild Life
- In office 29 October 2018 – 15 December 2018

State Minister of Foreign Affairs
- In office 31 May 2017 – 26 October 2018
- President: Maithripala Sirisena
- Prime Minister: Ranil Wickremesinghe

State Minister of Irrigation and Water Resources Management
- In office 9 September 2015 – 31 May 2017
- President: Maithripala Sirisena
- Prime Minister: Ranil Wickremesinghe

Deputy Minister of Tourism and Sports
- In office 12 January 2015 – 17 August 2015
- President: Maithripala Sirisena
- Prime Minister: Ranil Wickremesinghe

Member of Parliament for Gampaha District
- In office 22 April 2010 – 26 June 2015

Personal details
- Born: June 28, 1973 (age 53)
- Education: S.Thomas' Preparatory school- Kollupitiya

Vasantha Senanayake (born 28 June 1973) is a Sri Lankan politician who was a member of the Parliament of Sri Lanka. He belongs to the United National Party. He is a great-grandson of D. S. Senanayake (Sri Lanka's "Father of the Nation") and cousin of Ruwan Wijewardene.

Senanayake was appointed State Minister of Foreign Affairs in the United National Party led national government on May 31, 2017. He was the State Minister of Irrigation and Water Resources Management from 2015 to 2017. He was the Deputy Minister of Tourism and Sports in the United National Party 100 days government. Senanayake served as acting Foreign Minister when the Minister Ravi Karunanayake resigned on 10 August 2017. Vasantha Senanayake as state minister of foreign affairs developed a close friendship with Lord Naseby of the UK House of Lords and supported vociferously the English Peer's condemnation of the characterization of the war and the Sri Lankan military.

During the 2018 Sri Lanka constitutional crisis, Senanayake, a Member of Parliament elected on the United National Party's Polonnaruwa District ticket in 2015, switched his alliance on multiple occasions between the two political parties that were battling for power. Initially he pledged his support for Mahinda Rajapaksa who appointed him as Minister of Tourism and Wildlife after controversially dismissing prime minister Ranil Wickremesinghe. Senanayake then returned his alliance to the United National Party, announcing his resignation from his ministerial portfolio, but later supported Rajapaksa again. This turbulence which Senanayake faced in his second term in Parliament moving between the UNP, the party of his ancestors and the Rajapakse camp may be attributed to his dilemma. Which can be attributed to him of wanting to belong to the ‘Old UNP’ but fiercely attempting to resist and depose its present occupant and leader of four decades Ranil Wickremasinghe. Wickremasinghe remains in office today after leading the UNP to its worst ever defeat in which the party secured no elected seats and Wickremasinghe scrambled in on a single National List seat the party had secured. He went on to be appointed president of Sri Lanka following the peoples uprising and Gotabhaya Rajapaksha's resignation in 2022.

Senanayake suggested early in his parliamentary career that the imposition of an overly powerful executive presidency on a Westminster type parliament was likely to cause repercussions in Parliament's role, human rights and national policy and rule of law. He submitted a model constitution for the reflections of the select committee. In parliament he has been an active lobbyist against the alcohol and tobacco industries. He has been espousing the importance of transforming modern Sri Lanka in to a commercial trading hub giving emphasis to Sri Lanka's geographical position. Senanayake also established strong contacts with many countries and world leaders during his tenure in the foreign ministry.

Senanayake did not contest for election in 2020, and has been spending much of his time writing. His first published book 'Transcending Sita' has been well received.
