= Ministry of Youth Affairs and Skills Development =

Government ministry of Sri Lanka

Agency overview
- Jurisdiction: Sri Lanka
- Employees: 2,882
- Annual budget: Rs 11.220,108 Billion
- Minister responsible: Sunil Kumara Gamage
- Website: youthskillsmin.gov.lk

The Ministry of Youth Affairs and Skills Development is the Sri Lankan government ministry responsible “to build up a young generation capable of actively participating in national development endowed with skills and personality.”

== List of ministers ==
The Minister of Youth Affairs and Skills Development is an appointment in the Cabinet of Sri Lanka.

Parties

Sri Lanka Freedom Party United National Party Sri Lanka Podujana Peramuna National People's Power

Name	Portrait	Party	Tenure	President
Pavithra Devi Wanniarachchi		Sri Lanka Freedom Party	28 January 2007 - 23 April 2010	Mahinda Rajapaksa
Dullas Alahapperuma		Sri Lanka Freedom Party	23 April 2010 - 12 January 2015	Mahinda Rajapaksa
Niroshan Perera		United National Party	12 January 2015 - 17 August 2015	Maithripala Sirisena
Sagala Ratnayaka		United National Party	1 May 2018 - 26 October 2018	Maithripala Sirisena
Maithripala Sirisena		Sri Lanka Freedom Party	1 November 2018 - 20 December 2018	Maithripala Sirisena
Ranil Wickremesinghe		United National Party	20 December 2018 - 18 March 2019	Maithripala Sirisena
Dullas Alahapperuma		Sri Lanka Podujana Peramuna	22 November 2019 - 12 August 2020	Gotabaya Rajapaksa
Namal Rajapaksa		Sri Lanka Podujana Peramuna	12 August 2020 - 18 April 2022	Gotabaya Rajapaksa
Thenuka Vidanagamage		Sri Lanka Podujana Peramuna	18 April 2022 - 23 May 2022	Gotabaya Rajapaksa
Roshan Ranasinghe		Sri Lanka Podujana Peramuna	23 May 2022 - 27 November 2023	Gotabaya Rajapaksa
Harin Fernando		United National Party	27 November 2023 - 9 August 2024	Ranil Wickremesinghe
Harini Amarasuriya		National People's Power	24 September 2024 - 18 November 2024	Anura Kumara Dissanayake
Sunil Kumara Gamage		National People's Power	18 November 2024 - Present	Anura Kumara Dissanayake

== See also ==
- List of ministries of Sri Lanka
