= Vajira Abeywardena =

Sri Lankan politician

Hon. Wajira Abeywardana
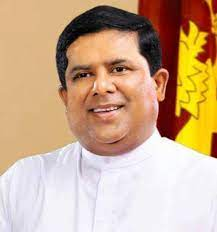

Minister of Home Affairs
- In office 4 September 2015 – 21 November 2019
- President: Maithripala Sirisena
- Prime Minister: Ranil Wickremesinghe
- Preceded by: Joseph Michael Perera

Minister of Public Administration, Management & Reforms
- In office 2001–2004

Member of Parliament for National list
- In office 27 July 2022 – 24 September 2024
- Preceded by: Ranil Wickremesinghe

Member of Parliament for Galle District
- In office 2015–2020
- In office 1994–2010

Personal details
- Born: 2 September 1960 (age 65)
- Party: United National Party
- Other political affiliations: United National Front
- Education: Mahinda College; University of Moratuwa

Wajira Abeywardana (born 2 September 1960) is a Sri Lankan politician and a member of parliament for National List. He is the current chairman of the United National Party.

Abeywardana is one of the most senior leaders with 38 years of political experience in the party (apart from President Ranil Wickremesinghe, John Amaratunge and few others). He is also the leader who has dedicated almost the entirety of his career for the party.

Wajira Abeywardana previously served as Minister of Public Administration, Management and Reforms in the UNP government led by Ranil Wickremesinghe in 2001. Wajira Abeywardana was educated at Mahinda College, Galle and University of Moratuwa.

== Early life and education ==
Born to parents both of whom were teachers in Uluvitike of Galle, Wajira Abeywardana had the opportunity to study at Mahinda College where his father has been teaching. He received his education in a Buddhist environment and also served as a student leader of the Dhamma school at the village temple under the guidance of the learned Buddhist monks in the area. Wajira Abeywardana received the opportunity to pursue higher studies at the University of Moratuwa after successfully completing his school education. He holds a degree in Civil Engineering from the University of Moratuwa.

== Political career ==
Wajira Abeywardana has reached numerous milestones in his political career thus far. The accounts below detail his political career from 1982 to 2020.

=== 1982 - 1994 ===
A child from a family inclined towards the United National Party, he was a prolific activist of the United National Party since his entrance to the University of Moratuwa. His first entry in to the political sphere was by becoming the Vice-Secretary of the Samawadhi Student Front at the University of Moratuwa in 1982. He later held the positions of General Secretary, President, and Student Coordinating Officer respectively.

He was later elected to the All Ceylon Youth Front from 1983 to 1994 and represented its Working Committee during his tenure. He also contested in the Provincial Council Elections in 1987 and became a Councilor in the Southern Province, Sri Lanka obtaining over 6,000 preferential votes. He was appointed as the Co-Chief Organizer of the Akmeemana Electorate in 1987 by His Excellency the President J.R. Jayewardene - then Leader of United National Party. He contested for the Southern Province, Sri Lanka in 1992 for the second time and got elected as a Councilor by obtaining the second highest number of preferential votes in Galle District just behind the Chief Ministerial Candidate.

Wajira Abeywardana contested for the Southern Province, Sri Lanka in 1993 in the By-election and got elected again as a Councilor by obtaining second highest number of preferential votes (31,000) in Galle District just, behind the Chief Ministerial Candidate. He was appointed to the UNP Working Committee in 1993 by the then Leader of UNP. His Excellency the President D.B. Wijetunge and became the Assistant Secretary in charge of UNP youth affairs in 1993.

Wajira Abeywardana contested in the General Elections in 1994 for the first time and became a UNP Member of Parliament by securing the first place in Galle District (81,373 votes) and seventh place of the MPs of the opposition as a normal candidate without being the District leader. He resigned from the Provincial Council in August 1994 and entered national politics by becoming a Member of Parliament representing the opposition in Parliament.

=== 1994 - 2014 ===
Wajira Abeywardana served as the UNP Chief Organizer of the Galle electorate from 1994 to date. He engaged in international tours covering countries such as Greece, Crete Island, Germany, Italy, Kenya, Singapore, and Japan to participate in rounds of political discussion in order to bring peace to the country in 1994 and 1998.

After his appointment as the Chairman of the Galle District Organization, he assumed the leadership of Galle District in 1999 and held these positions to date. He obtained over one hundred thousand preferential votes at the Parliamentary Elections in 2000 as the Leader of the Galle District UNP Parliamentary Group.

Wajira Abeywardana secured the victory of the District for the UNP in 2001 after becoming the Chairman of the Galle District Organisation. He secured the first place in the Galle District the 6th place in the island by obtaining 110,055 preferential votes at the Parliamentary Elections in 2001 and was appointed as the Cabinet Minister of Public Administration, Management and Reforms in the year 2001. He directed the UNP as the Galle District Leader at the Parliamentary Elections of 2004 and entered the Parliament by obtaining 126,037 preferential votes and becoming the first in Galle representing the opposition.

He became the Chairman of the UNP Subcommittee on Provincial Councils and Local Government in 2005 and operated all over Sri Lanka to strengthen the United National Party. From August 2014 prepared a programme for all 12,000 Voting Centres, provided all necessary documents and financially strengthened all Centres in order to win the Presidential Election.

=== 2015 - 2020 ===
From 8 January to September 2015 Wajira Abeywardana assisted the Government as a Special Representative of the Hon. Prime Minister Ranil Wickremesinghe. He entered the Parliament again in 2015 after securing 142,874 preferential votes and obtained the highest number of votes (285,000) in Galle District in the History.

Wajira Abeywardana was appointed as the Minister of Home Affairs in September 2015 and was later appointed as the Minister of Internal & Home Affairs and Provincial Councils & Local Government in 2018. He directed the Presidential Election in the Galle District in 2019 and won the Galle Electorate in order to fulfill the duty of the party for the Presidential Candidate amidst the defeat of all other electorates from Ratmalana to Ampara.

Directed the election battle at the last general election with the highest commitment, when many people were leaving the party for short-term political benefits. Despite this hurdle, he successfully secured the highest percentage of votes for the Galle District out of all the Districts in the country. He obtained 3.11% of the votes (the highest percentage) for the United National Party in the Galle District by limiting the percentage votes of Samagi Jana Balawegaya to the lowest figure of 18.93% among all the Districts in the Island. Wajira Abeywardana encouraged the party leadership to ensure unity and positive restructuring even after its defeat.
