= Dushmantha Mithrapala =

Sri Lankan politician

Hon. Dushmantha Mithrapala MP
- දුෂ්මන්ත මිත්‍රපාල துஷ்மந்த மித்ரபால

Acting General Secretary of Sri Lanka Freedom Party
- Incumbent
- Assumed office 11 September 2023
- Chairperson: Maithripala Sirisena
- Preceded by: Dayasiri Jayasekara

Member of Parliament for Kegalle District
- Incumbent
- Assumed office 2015

Personal details
- Party: Sri Lanka Freedom Party
- Other political affiliations: United People's Freedom Alliance

Dushmantha Mithrapala is a Sri Lankan politician and a member of the Parliament of Sri Lanka. He was elected from Kegalle District in 2015 on a Sri Lanka Freedom Party ticket.
