= Kumaratunga cabinets =

1994–2005 government of Sri Lanka

Kumaratunga cabinet
- 10th Cabinet of Sri Lanka

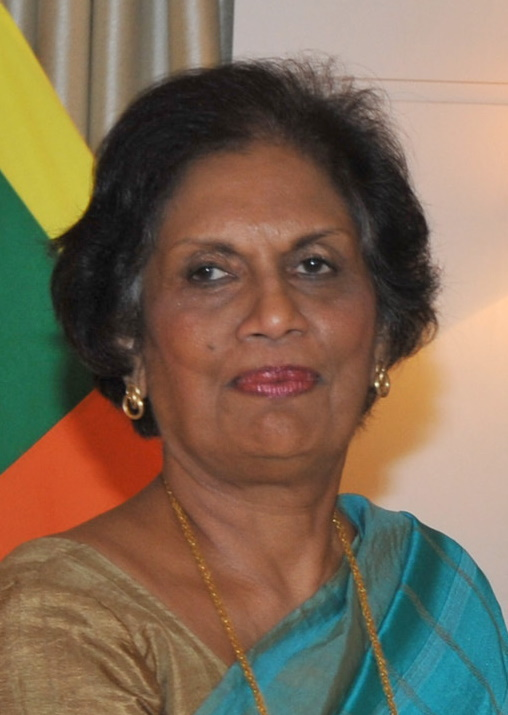
- Date formed: 12 November 1994
- Date dissolved: 19 November 2005

People and organisations
- Head of state: Chandrika Kumaratunga
- Head of government: Chandrika Kumaratunga
- Deputy head of government: Sirimavo Bandaranaike (1994-00); Ratnasiri Wickremanayake (2000–01); Ranil Wickremesinghe (2001–04); Mahinda Rajapaksa (2004–05)
- No. of ministers: 41 (2000-2001); 44 (2001-2004); 36 (2004-2005)
- Total no. of members: 121
- Member parties: People's Alliance (1994–01, 2004–05); Sri Lanka Muslim Congress (1994–04); United National Front (2001–04); United People's Freedom Alliance (2004–05); National Congress (2004–05); National Unity Alliance (2004–05)
- Status in legislature: Majority coalition (1994–00; 2001–04); Minority coalition (2000–01; 2004–05)
- Opposition party: United National Party (1994–01); People's Alliance (2001–04); United National Front (2004–05)
- Opposition leader: Ranil Wickremesinghe (1994–01); Ratnasiri Wickremanayake (2001–02); Mahinda Rajapaksa (2002–04); Ranil Wickremesinghe (2004–05)

History
- Elections: 1994, 1999, 2000, 2001, 2004
- Outgoing election: 2005
- Legislature terms: 10th, 11th, 12th, 13th
- Predecessor: Wijetunga
- Successor: Mahinda Rajapaksa

The Kumaratunga cabinet was the central government of Sri Lanka led by President Chandrika Kumaratunga between 1994 and 2005. It was formed in November 1994 when Kumaratunga was elected president and it ended in November 2005 when her second limited term ended. The Kumaratunga cabinet saw the only significant period of co-habitation in Sri Lanka since the executive presidency was introduced in 1978. Between 2001 and 2004 President Kumaratunga, leader of the Sri Lanka Freedom Party/People's Alliance, had to share power with her opponents, the United National Party/United National Front.

== Cabinet members ==
Name	Portrait	Party	Office	Took office	Left office	Refs
Chandrika Kumaratunga		Sri Lanka Freedom Party	President	12 November 1994	19 November 2005	
Chandrika Kumaratunga		Sri Lanka Freedom Party	Minister of Defence			
Chandrika Kumaratunga		Sri Lanka Freedom Party	Minister of Finance and Planning	(Note: Continuation of same office held in previous cabinet.)	5 December 2001	
Chandrika Kumaratunga		Sri Lanka Freedom Party	Minister of Media			
Chandrika Kumaratunga		Sri Lanka Freedom Party	Minister of Samurdhi Affairs			
Chandrika Kumaratunga		Sri Lanka Freedom Party	Minister of Tourism and Aviation			
Chandrika Kumaratunga		Sri Lanka Freedom Party	Minister of Buddha Sasana			
Chandrika Kumaratunga		Sri Lanka Freedom Party	Minister of Defence, Public Security, Law and Order			
Chandrika Kumaratunga		Sri Lanka Freedom Party	Minister of Education			
Sirimavo Bandaranaike		Sri Lanka Freedom Party	Prime Minister	14 November 1994	9 August 2000	
Ratnasiri Wickremanayake		Sri Lanka Freedom Party	Prime Minister	10 August 2000	7 December 2001	
Ratnasiri Wickremanayake		Sri Lanka Freedom Party	Minister of Buddha Sasana Religious Affairs and Plantation Industries	19 October 2000		
Ratnasiri Wickremanayake		Sri Lanka Freedom Party	Minister of Buddha Sasana	26 May 2004		
Ratnasiri Wickremanayake		Sri Lanka Freedom Party	Minister of Public Security, Law and Order	26 May 2004		
Ratnasiri Wickremanayake		Sri Lanka Freedom Party	Minister of Agriculture	27 July 2005		
Ranil Wickremesinghe		United National Party	Prime Minister	9 December 2001	2 April 2004	
Ranil Wickremesinghe		United National Party	Minister of Policy Planning	12 December 2001		
Mahinda Rajapaksa		Sri Lanka Freedom Party	Minister of Fisheries and Aquatic Resources Development	19 October 2000	14 September 2001	
Mahinda Rajapaksa		Sri Lanka Freedom Party	Minister of Ports, Shipping and Fisheries	14 September 2001		
Mahinda Rajapaksa		Sri Lanka Freedom Party	Prime Minister	6 April 2004	19 November 2005	
Mahinda Rajapaksa		Sri Lanka Freedom Party	Minister of Highways	10 April 2004		
Mahinda Yapa Abeywardena		Sri Lanka Freedom Party	Minister of Cultural Affairs and National Heritage	25 July 2005		
A. R. M. Abdul Cader		United National Party	Minister of Co-operatives	12 December 2001		
Alick Aluwihare		United National Party	Minister of Home Affairs and Local Government	12 December 2001		
John Amaratunga		United National Party	Minister of Interior	12 December 2001	4 November 2003	
Sarath Amunugama		Sri Lanka Freedom Party	Minister of Irrigation and Water Resources Management	19 October 2000		
Sarath Amunugama		Sri Lanka Freedom Party	Minister of Education and Higher Education	14 September 2001		
Sarath Amunugama		Sri Lanka Freedom Party	Minister of Finance	10 April 2004	22 November 2005	
Sarath Amunugama		Sri Lanka Freedom Party	Minister of Industry and Investment Promotion	22 August 2005		
Ferial Ashraff		Sri Lanka Muslim Congress	Minister of Development, Rehabilitation and Reconstruction of the East, Rural Housing Development and Women's Affairs	14 September 2001		
Ferial Ashraff		National Unity Alliance	Minister of Housing and Construction Industry, Eastern Province Education and Irrigation Development	10 April 2004		
A. L. M. Athaullah		National Congress	Minister of Infrastructure Development in the Eastern Province	10 April 2004		
Tissa Attanayake		United National Party	Minister of Central Region Development	12 December 2001		
Gamini Atukorale		United National Party	Minister of Transport, Highways and Aviation	12 December 2001		
Anura Bandaranaike		Sri Lanka Freedom Party	Minister of Industry, Tourism and Investment Promotion	10 April 2004		
Anura Bandaranaike		Sri Lanka Freedom Party	Minister of Industry and Investment Promotion	17 September 2004		
Anura Bandaranaike		Sri Lanka Freedom Party	Minister of Tourism	17 September 2004		
Anura Bandaranaike		Sri Lanka Freedom Party	Minister of Foreign Affairs	22 August 2005		
K. N. Choksy		United National Party	Minister of Finance	12 December 2001	2 April 2004	
Reginald Cooray		Sri Lanka Freedom Party	Minister of Ethnic Affairs and National Integration	19 October 2000		
Reginald Cooray		Sri Lanka Freedom Party	Minister of Information and Media	10 April 2004		
P. Dayaratna		United National Party	Minister of Health	12 December 2001		
Ronnie de Mel		Sri Lanka Freedom Party	Minister of Ports Development and Development of the South	19 October 2000	14 September 2001	
Ronnie de Mel		Sri Lanka Freedom Party	Minister of Trade, Industrial Development and Rural Industries	14 September 2001		
Nimal Siripala de Silva		Sri Lanka Freedom Party	Minister of Posts and Telecommunications	19 October 2000	14 September 2001	
Nimal Siripala de Silva		Sri Lanka Freedom Party	Minister of Health, Indigenous Medicine and Social Services	14 September 2001		
Nimal Siripala de Silva		Sri Lanka Freedom Party	Minister of Healthcare, Nutrition and Uva-Wellassa Development	10 April 2004		
Douglas Devananda		Eelam People's Democratic Party	Minister of Rehabilitation and Reconstruction of the North	19 October 2000		
Douglas Devananda		Eelam People's Democratic Party	Minister of Development, Rehabilitation and Reconstruction of the North and North East Tamil Affairs	14 September 2001		
Douglas Devananda		Eelam People's Democratic Party	Minister of Agricultural Marketing Development, Hindu Affairs and Tamil Language Schools and Vocational Training (North)	10 April 2004		
Salinda Dissanayake		Sri Lanka Freedom Party	Minister of Land Development and Minor Export Agricultural Crops	19 October 2000		
S. B. Dissanayake		Sri Lanka Freedom Party	Minister of Samurdhi, Rural Development and Parliamentary Affairs	19 October 2000		
S. B. Dissanayake		United National Party	Minister of Agriculture, Livestock and Welfare	12 December 2001		
Amarasiri Dodangoda		Sri Lanka Freedom Party	Minister of Vocational Training	19 October 2000	14 September 2001	
Amarasiri Dodangoda		Sri Lanka Freedom Party	Minister of Human Resources Development, Technical and Vocational Education	14 September 2001		
Amarasiri Dodangoda		Sri Lanka Freedom Party	Minister of Public Administration and Home Affairs	10 April 2004		
Nandimithra Ekanayake		Sri Lanka Freedom Party	Minister of Provincial Councils and Local Government	19 October 2000		
Milroy Fernando		Sri Lanka Freedom Party	Minister of Social Services and Fishing Community Housing Development	19 October 2000		
Milroy Fernando		Sri Lanka Freedom Party	Minister of Christian and Parliamentary Affairs	10 April 2004		
Tyronne Fernando		United National Party	Minister of Foreign Affairs	12 December 2001		
Jeyaraj Fernandopulle		Sri Lanka Freedom Party	Minister of Civil Aviation and Airports Development	19 October 2000		
Jeyaraj Fernandopulle		Sri Lanka Freedom Party	Minister of Trade, Commerce and Consumer Affairs	10 April 2004		
A. H. M. Fowzie		Sri Lanka Freedom Party	Minister of Highways	19 October 2000	14 September 2001	
A. H. M. Fowzie		Sri Lanka Freedom Party	Minister of Highways and Muslim Religious Affairs	14 September 2001		
A. H. M. Fowzie		Sri Lanka Freedom Party	Minister of Environment and Natural Resources	10 April 2004		
Piyasena Gamage		Sri Lanka Freedom Party	Minister of Skills Development, Vocational and Technical Education	10 April 2004		
Leslie Gunawardana		Lanka Sama Samaja Party	Minister of Science and Technology	19 October 2000	14 September 2001	
Monty Gopallawa		Sri Lanka Freedom Party	Minister of Cultural Affairs	19 October 2000		
D. E. W. Gunasekera		Communist Party	Minister of Constitutional Reform	26 May 2004		
Bandula Gunawardane		United National Party	Minister of Rural Economy	12 December 2001		
Dinesh Gunawardena		Mahajana Eksath Peramuna	Minister of Transport	19 October 2000		
Dinesh Gunawardena		Mahajana Eksath Peramuna	Minister of Transport and Environment Protection	14 September 2001		
Dinesh Gunawardena		Mahajana Eksath Peramuna	Minister of Urban Development and Water Supply	10 April 2004		
Indika Gunawardena		Sri Lanka Freedom Party	Minister of Higher Education and Information Technology Development	19 October 2000		
Indika Gunawardena		Sri Lanka Freedom Party	Minister of Posts and Telecommunication	14 September 2001		
Rauff Hakeem		Sri Lanka Muslim Congress	Minister of Internal and International Trade Commerce, Muslim Religious Affairs and Shipping Development	19 October 2000	20 June 2001	
Rauff Hakeem		Sri Lanka Muslim Congress	Minister of Ports Development and Shipping	12 December 2001		
Maheepala Herath		Sri Lanka Freedom Party	Minister of Rural Industrial Development	19 October 2000		
D. M. Jayaratne		Sri Lanka Freedom Party	Minister of Agriculture	19 October 2000	14 September 2001	
D. M. Jayaratne		Sri Lanka Freedom Party	Minister of Agriculture, Forestry, Food and Co-operative Development	14 September 2001		
D. M. Jayaratne		Sri Lanka Freedom Party	Minister of Post, Telecommunications and Udarata Development	10 April 2004		
Sumedha G. Jayasena		Sri Lanka Freedom Party	Minister of Women's Affairs	19 October 2000	14 September 2001	
Sumedha G. Jayasena		Sri Lanka Freedom Party	Minister of Women's Empowerment and Social Welfare	10 April 2004		
Karu Jayasuriya		United National Party	Minister of Power and Energy	12 December 2001		
Lakshman Kadirgamar		Sri Lanka Freedom Party	Minister of Foreign Affairs			
Lakshman Kadirgamar		Sri Lanka Freedom Party	Minister of Foreign Affairs	10 April 2004	12 August 2005	
Tissa Karalliyadde		Sri Lanka Freedom Party	Minister of Indigenous Medicine	19 October 2000		
Tissa Karalliyadde		Sri Lanka Freedom Party	Minister of Indigenous Medicine	10 April 2004		
Lakshman Kiriella		Sri Lanka Freedom Party	Minister of Tourism and Sports	19 October 2000		
Lakshman Kiriella		United National Party	Minister of Plantation Industries	12 December 2001		
Ananda Kularatne		United National Party	Minister of Southern Regional Development	12 December 2001		
Jeewan Kumaranatunga		Sri Lanka Freedom Party	Minister of Youth Affairs	19 October 2000		
Jeewan Kumaranatunga		Sri Lanka Freedom Party	Minister of Sports and Youth Affairs	10 April 2004		
W. J. M. Lokubandara		United National Party	Minister of Justice, Law Reform and Buddhist Affairs	12 December 2001		
Gamini Lokuge		United National Party	Minister of Tourism	12 December 2001		
Tilak Marapana		United National Party	Minister of Defence	12 December 2001	4 November 2003	
Wijayapala Mendis		Sri Lanka Freedom Party	Minister Without Portfolio	19 October 2000		
M. H. Mohamed		United National Party	Minister of Western Region Development	12 December 2001		
Alavi Moulana		Sri Lanka Freedom Party	Minister of Labour	19 October 2000		
S. B. Nawinne		Sri Lanka Freedom Party	Minister of Regional Infrastructure Development	10 April 2004		
Richard Pathirana		Sri Lanka Freedom Party	Minister of Public Administration, Home Affairs and Administrative Reforms	19 October 2000	14 September 2001	
Richard Pathirana		Sri Lanka Freedom Party	Minister of Public Administration, Home Affairs, Provincial Councils, Local Government and Southern Development	14 September 2001		
G. L. Peiris		Sri Lanka Freedom Party	Minister of Constitutional Affairs and Industrial Development	19 October 2000		
G. L. Peiris		United National Party	Minister of Industrial Development	12 December 2001		
Dilan Perera		Sri Lanka Freedom Party	Minister of Estate Housing, Infrastructure and Community Development	21 October 2005		
Felix Perera		Sri Lanka Freedom Party	Minister of Transport	10 April 2004		
Felix Perera		Sri Lanka Freedom Party	Minister of Railways	25 July 2005		
Gamini Jayawickrama Perera		United National Party	Minister of Irrigation and Water Management	12 December 2001		
Susil Premajayantha		Sri Lanka Freedom Party	Minister of Education	19 October 2000		
Susil Premajayantha		Sri Lanka Freedom Party	Minister of Power and Energy	10 April 2004		
Reggie Ranatunga		Sri Lanka Freedom Party	Minister of Food and Marketing Development	19 October 2000		
Amara Piyaseeli Ratnayake		United National Party	Minister of Women's Affairs	12 December 2001		
C. B. Ratnayake		Sri Lanka Freedom Party	Minister of Estate Community Infrastructure	10 April 2004		
C. B. Ratnayake		Sri Lanka Freedom Party	Minister of Medium and Small Scale Plantation Industries and Rural Human Resources Development	17 September 2004		
Anuruddha Ratwatte		Sri Lanka Freedom Party	Minister of Power and Energy	19 October 2000		
Anuruddha Ratwatte		Sri Lanka Freedom Party	Minister of Lands, Irrigation and Power	14 September 2001		
Mangala Samaraweera		Sri Lanka Freedom Party	Minister of Urban Development, Construction and Public Utilities	19 October 2000		
Mangala Samaraweera		Sri Lanka Freedom Party	Minister of Urban Development, Public Utilities, Housing and Sports	14 September 2001		
Mangala Samaraweera		Sri Lanka Freedom Party	Minister of Ports and Aviation	10 April 2004		
H. B. Semasinghe		Sri Lanka Freedom Party	Minister of Co-operative Development	19 October 2000	14 September 2001	
Rukman Senanayake		United National Party	Minister of Environment and Natural Resources	12 December 2001		
Athauda Seneviratne		Sri Lanka Freedom Party	Minister of Labour, Youth Affairs and Mineral Resources Development	14 September 2001		
Athauda Seneviratne		Sri Lanka Freedom Party	Minister of Labour Relations and Foreign Employment	10 April 2004		
John Seneviratne		Sri Lanka Freedom Party	Minister of Health	19 October 2000		
John Seneviratne		Sri Lanka Freedom Party	Minister of Justice and Judicial Reforms	10 April 2004		
Maithripala Sirisena		Sri Lanka Freedom Party	Minister of Mahaweli Development	19 October 2000	14 September 2001	
Maithripala Sirisena		Sri Lanka Freedom Party	Minister of Mahaweli Development and Parliamentary Affairs	14 September 2001		
Maithripala Sirisena		Sri Lanka Freedom Party	Minister of River Basin Development and Rajarata Development	10 April 2004		
Muthu Sivalingam		Ceylon Workers' Congress	Minister of Estate Housing, Infrastructure and Community Development	10 September 2004		
Janaka Bandara Tennakoon		Sri Lanka Freedom Party	Minister of Provincial Councils and Local Government	10 April 2004		
Arumugam Thondaman		Ceylon Workers' Congress	Minister of Estate Infrastructure and Livestock Development	19 October 2000		
Arumugam Thondaman		Ceylon Workers' Congress	Minister of Livestock Development and Estate Infrastructure	September 2001		
Arumugam Thondaman		Ceylon Workers' Congress	Minister of Housing and Plantation Infrastructure	12 December 2001		
Tissa Vitharana		Lanka Sama Samaja Party	Minister of Science and Technology	10 April 2004		
Pavithra Devi Wanniarachchi		Sri Lanka Freedom Party	Minister of Plan Implementation	19 October 2000		
Pavithra Devi Wanniarachchi		Sri Lanka Freedom Party	Minister of Samurdhi and Poverty Alleviation	10 April 2004		
Wiswa Warnapala		Sri Lanka Freedom Party	Minister of Parliamentary Affairs	23 August 2005		
Batty Weerakoon		Lanka Sama Samaja Party	Minister of Justice	19 October 2000	14 September 2001	
Batty Weerakoon		Lanka Sama Samaja Party	Minister of Justice, Ethnic Affairs and National Integration	14 September 2001		
Mahinda Wijesekara		Sri Lanka Freedom Party	Minister of Forestry and Environment	19 October 2000		
Mahinda Wijesekara		United National Party	Minister of Fisheries and Ocean Resources	12 December 2001		
Anura Priyadharshana Yapa		Sri Lanka Freedom Party	Minister of Information and Media	19 October 2000		
Anura Priyadharshana Yapa		Sri Lanka Freedom Party	Minister of Plantation Industries	10 April 2004		

== Project ministers ==
Name	Portrait	Party	Office	Took office	Left office	Refs
Vajira Abeywardena		United National Party	Project Minister of Public Administration	12 December 2001		
A. L. M. Athaullah		Sri Lanka Muslim Congress	Project Minister of Highways	12 December 2001		
A. H. M. Azwer		United National Party	Project Minister of Parliamentary Affairs	12 December 2001		
Rohitha Bogollagama		United National Party	Project Minister of Industries	12 December 2001		
P. Chandrasekaran		Up-Country People's Front	Project Minister of Estate Infrastructure	12 December 2001		
Johnston Fernando		United National Party	Project Minister of Youth Affairs and Sports	12 December 2001		
Lal Gamage		United National Party	Project Minister of Assisting Foreign Affairs	12 December 2001		
Earl Gunasekara		United National Party	Project Minister of Home Affairs and Local Government	12 December 2001		
P. Harrison		United National Party	Project Minister of Housing Development	12 December 2001		
Kabir Hashim		United National Party	Project Minister of Tertiary Education	12 December 2001		
Jayalath Jayawardena		United National Party	Project Minister of Rehabilitation, Resettlement and Refugees	12 December 2001		
Ravi Karunanayake		United National Party	Project Minister of Commerce and Consumer Affairs	12 December 2001		
Karunasena Kodituwakku		United National Party	Project Minister of Human Resources, Education and Culture	12 December 2001		
T. Maheswaran		United National Party	Project Minister of Hindu Affairs	12 December 2001		
M. Mahroof		United National Party	Project Minister of Urban Public Utilities	12 December 2001		
Imithiyas Bakeer Makar		United National Party	Project Minister of Mass Communication	12 December 2001	4 November 2003	
Noordeen Mashoor		United National Party	Project Minister of Assisting Vanni Rehabilitation	12 December 2001		
Milinda Moragoda		United National Party	Project Minister of Economic Reforms, Science and Technology	12 December 2001		
H. G. P. Nelson		United National Party	Project Minister of Irrigation	12 December 2001		
Upali Piyasena		United National Party	Project Minister of State Transport	12 December 2001		
Jayathilaka Podinilame		United National Party	Project Minister of North West Regional Development	12 December 2001		
Susantha Punchinilame		United National Party	Project Minister of Small Holder Development	12 December 2001		
Suranimala Rajapakse		United National Party	Project Minister of School Education	12 December 2001		
Mahinda Samarasinghe		United National Party	Project Minister of Employment and Labour	12 December 2001		
Ravindra Samaraweera		United National Party	Project Minister of Social Welfare	12 December 2001		
Rajitha Senaratne		United National Party	Project Minister of Land	12 December 2001		
Lakshman Senewiratne		United National Party	Project Minister of Water Management	12 December 2001		
R. A. D. Sirisena		United National Party	Project Minister of Samurdhi	12 December 2001		

== Deputy ministers ==
Name	Portrait	Party	Office	Took office	Left office	Refs
Mohideen Abdul Cader		Sri Lanka Muslim Congress	Deputy Minister of Fisheries and Aquatic Resources Development	3 November 2000		
Mohideen Abdul Cader		Sri Lanka Muslim Congress	Deputy Minister of Fisheries	12 December 2001		
M. N. Abdul Majeed		Sri Lanka Freedom Party	Deputy Minister of Post and Telecommunication	3 November 2000		
Rohitha Abeygunawardena		Sri Lanka Freedom Party	Deputy Minister of Post and Telecommunications and Udarata Development	10 April 2004		
Mahinda Yapa Abeywardena		Sri Lanka Freedom Party	Deputy Minister of Healthcare and Nutrition	10 April 2004		
Lasantha Alagiyawanna		Sri Lanka Freedom Party	Deputy Minister of Transport	10 April 2004		
Dullas Alahapperuma		Sri Lanka Freedom Party	Deputy Minister of Samurdhi, Rural Development, Parliamentary Affairs and Up-Country Development	3 November 2000		
Mahindananda Aluthgamage		Sri Lanka Freedom Party	Deputy Minister of Highways	3 November 2000		
Mahindananda Aluthgamage		Sri Lanka Freedom Party	Deputy Minister of Power and Energy	10 April 2004		
Mahindananda Aluthgamage		Sri Lanka Freedom Party	Deputy Minister of Samurdhi and Poverty Alleviation	12 August 2005		
Mahinda Amaraweera		Sri Lanka Freedom Party	Deputy Minister of Urban Development and Water Supply	10 April 2004		
Jagath Balasuriya		Sri Lanka Freedom Party	Deputy Minister of Urban Development, Construction and Public Utilities	3 November 2000		
Pandu Bandaranaike		Sri Lanka Freedom Party	Deputy Minister of Forestry and Environment	3 November 2000		
Pandu Bandaranaike		Sri Lanka Freedom Party	Deputy Minister of Public Administration and Home Affairs	10 April 2004		
Indika Bandaranayake		United National Party	Deputy Minister of Environment and Natural Resources	12 December 2001		
Bandula Basnayake		Sri Lanka Freedom Party	Deputy Minister of Environment and Natural Resources	10 April 2004		
Hussein Ahamed Bhaila		Sri Lanka Muslim Congress	Deputy Minister of Small and Medium Enterprise Development	11 October 2004		
S. M. Chandrasena		Sri Lanka Freedom Party	Deputy Minister of Estate Community Infrastructure	10 April 2004		
S. M. Chandrasena		Sri Lanka Freedom Party	Deputy Minister of Women's Empowerment and Social Welfare	11 October 2004		
Harindra Corea			Deputy Minister of Foreign Affairs	3 November 2000		
D. M. Dassanayake		Sri Lanka Freedom Party	Deputy Minister of Agriculture	3 November 2000		
D. M. Dassanayake		Sri Lanka Freedom Party	Deputy Minister of Livestock Development	10 April 2004		
D. M. Dassanayake		Sri Lanka Freedom Party	Deputy Minister of Relief, Rehabilitation and Reconciliation	11 October 2004		
Basheer Segu Dawood		Sri Lanka Muslim Congress	Deputy Minister of Housing	12 December 2001		
Tudor Dayaratne		Sri Lanka Freedom Party	Deputy Minister of Education	3 November 2000		
Duminda Dissanayake		Sri Lanka Freedom Party	Deputy Minister of Skills Development, Vocational and Technical Education	10 April 2004		
Navin Dissanayake		United National Party	Deputy Minister of Plantation Industries	12 December 2001		
Rohana Dissanayake		Sri Lanka Freedom Party	Deputy Minister of Samurdhi and Poverty Alleviation	10 April 2004		
Salinda Dissanayake		Sri Lanka Freedom Party	Deputy Minister of Samurdhi	14 September 2001		
Salinda Dissanayake		Sri Lanka Freedom Party	Deputy Minister of River Basin Development and Rajarata Development	10 April 2004		
Salinda Dissanayake		Sri Lanka Freedom Party	Deputy Minister of Irrigation, Mahaweli and Rajarata Development	19 July 2005		
S. B. Dissanayake		Sri Lanka Freedom Party	Deputy Minister of Finance	25 November 2000	13 September 2001	
Nandimithra Ekanayake		Sri Lanka Freedom Party	Deputy Minister of Post and Telecommunication	14 September 2001		
T. B. Ekanayake		Sri Lanka Freedom Party	Deputy Minister of Cultural Affairs	3 November 2000		
T. B. Ekanayake		Sri Lanka Freedom Party	Deputy Minister of Highways	10 April 2004		
Milroy Fernando		Sri Lanka Freedom Party	Deputy Minister of Fisheries	14 September 2001		
Chandrasiri Gajadeera		Sri Lanka Freedom Party	Deputy Minister of Vocational Training	3 November 2000		
Chandrasiri Gajadeera		Communist Party	Deputy Minister of Housing and Construction Industry, Eastern Province Education and Irrigation Development	10 April 2004		
Piyasena Gamage		Sri Lanka Freedom Party	Deputy Minister of Constitutional Affairs and Industrial Development	3 November 2000		
Siripala Gamalath		Sri Lanka Freedom Party	Deputy Minister of Agricultural Marketing Development	10 April 2004		
S. Ganeshamoorthy		Sri Lanka Freedom Party	Deputy Minister of Ethnic Affairs and National Integration	3 November 2000		
Monty Gopallawa		Sri Lanka Freedom Party	Deputy Minister of Buddha Sasana, Cultural and Religious Affairs	14 September 2001		
Bandula Gunawardane		United National Party	Deputy Minister of Finance	12 December 2001	7 February 2004	
Dinesh Gunawardena		Mahajana Eksath Peramuna	Deputy Minister of Education	10 April 2004		
Lionel Gunawardena			Deputy Minister of Health	3 November 2000		
H. M. N. Herath		Sri Lanka Freedom Party	Deputy Minister of Food and Marketing Development	3 November 2000		
Jayarathna Herath		Sri Lanka Freedom Party	Deputy Minister of Public Security, Law and Order	10 April 2004		
Maheepala Herath		Sri Lanka Freedom Party	Deputy Minister of Rural Industries	14 September 2001		
Maheepala Herath		Sri Lanka Freedom Party	Deputy Minister of Transport	10 April 2004		
M. H. Cegu Isadean		National Unity Alliance	Deputy Minister of Information and Media	10 April 2004		
M. I. Anwar Ismail		National Congress	Deputy Minister of Infrastructure Development in the Eastern Province	10 April 2004		
Piyankara Jayaratne		Sri Lanka Freedom Party	Deputy Minister of Youth Affairs	3 November 2000		
Premalal Jayasekara		Sri Lanka Freedom Party	Deputy Minister of River Basin Development and Rajarata Development	10 April 2004		
Tissa Karalliyadde		Sri Lanka Freedom Party	Deputy Minister of Indigenous Medicine	14 September 2001		
Chandana Kathriarachchi		Sri Lanka Freedom Party	Deputy Minister of Urban Development, Construction and Public Utilities	3 November 2000		
Sarath Keerthirathna		Sri Lanka Freedom Party	Deputy Minister of Agriculture	3 November 2000		
Lakshman Kiriella		Sri Lanka Freedom Party	Deputy Minister of Trade and Industrial Development	14 September 2001		
Nirmala Kotalawala		Sri Lanka Freedom Party	Deputy Minister of Small and Rural Industries	12 August 2005		
Jeewan Kumaranatunga		Sri Lanka Freedom Party	Deputy Minister of Housing and Sports	14 September 2001		
Udagama Heenmahatmaya Liyanage			Deputy Minister of Estate Infrastructure and Livestock Development	3 November 2000		
E. A. L Marrikar			Deputy Minister of Education	3 November 2000		
Noordeen Mashoor		Sri Lanka Muslim Congress	Deputy Minister of Ethnic Affairs and National Integration	3 November 2000		
H. R. Mithrapala		Sri Lanka Freedom Party	Deputy Minister of Trade, Commerce and Consumer Affairs	12 August 2005		
Alavi Moulana		Sri Lanka Freedom Party	Deputy Minister of Media	14 September 2001		
Faiszer Musthapha		Ceylon Workers' Congress	Deputy Minister of Tourism	10 June 2005		
K. H. G. N. Padmasiri		Sri Lanka Freedom Party	Deputy Minister of Plantation Industries	3 November 2000		
G. L. Peiris		Sri Lanka Freedom Party	Deputy Minister of Finance	24 November 1994	9 August 2000	
G. L. Peiris		Sri Lanka Freedom Party	Deputy Minister of Finance	16 August 2000	10 October 2000	
Dilan Perera		Sri Lanka Freedom Party	Deputy Minister of Ports and Aviation	10 April 2004		
Felix Perera		Sri Lanka Freedom Party	Deputy Minister of Power and Energy	3 November 2000		
Felix Perera		Sri Lanka Freedom Party	Deputy Minister of Power	14 September 2001		
Munidasa Premachandra		Sri Lanka Freedom Party	Deputy Minister of Highways	3 November 2000		
Munidasa Premachandra		Sri Lanka Freedom Party	Deputy Minister of Agriculture and Forestry	14 September 2001		
Sajith Premadasa		United National Party	Deputy Minister of Health	12 December 2001		
Susil Premajayantha		Sri Lanka Freedom Party	Deputy Minister of Urban Development and Public Utilities	14 September 2001		
Ediriweera Premaratne		Sri Lanka Freedom Party	Deputy Minister of Buddha Sasana and Religious Affairs	3 November 2000		
Shantha Premaratne		Sri Lanka Freedom Party	Deputy Minister of Irrigation and Water Resources Management	3 November 2000		
Shantha Premaratne		Sri Lanka Freedom Party	Deputy Minister of Tourism and Aviation	14 September 2001		
Jagath Pushpakumara		Sri Lanka Freedom Party	Deputy Minister of Samurdhi and Poverty Alleviation	10 April 2004		
Chamal Rajapaksa		Sri Lanka Freedom Party	Deputy Minister of Ports Development and Development of the South	3 November 2000		
Chamal Rajapaksa		Sri Lanka Freedom Party	Deputy Minister of Plantation Industries	10 April 2004		
Arjuna Ranatunga		Sri Lanka Freedom Party	Deputy Minister of Industry, Tourism and Investment Promotion	7 May 2004		
Reggie Ranatunga		Sri Lanka Freedom Party	Deputy Minister of Ports and Shipping	14 September 2001		
Jayatissa Ranaweera		Sri Lanka Freedom Party	Deputy Minister of Land Development and Minor Export Agriculture	3 November 2000		
Jayatissa Ranaweera		Sri Lanka Freedom Party	Deputy Minister of Provincial Councils and Local Government	10 April 2004		
Sagala Ratnayaka		United National Party	Deputy Minister of Power and Energy	12 December 2001		
Anuruddha Ratwatte		Sri Lanka Freedom Party	Deputy Minister of Defence	14 September 2001		
Neil Rupasinghe		Sri Lanka Freedom Party	Deputy Minister of Labour	3 November 2000		
Mangala Samaraweera		Sri Lanka Freedom Party	Deputy Minister of Finance and Planning	14 September 2001	7 December 2001	
Mangala Samaraweera		Sri Lanka Freedom Party	Deputy Minister of Education	10 April 2004		
M. S. Sellasamy		Ceylon Workers' Congress	Deputy Minister of Estate Housing, Infrastructure and Community Development	10 September 2004		
John Seneviratne		Sri Lanka Freedom Party	Deputy Minister of Health and Social Services	14 September 2001		
Mervyn Silva			Deputy Minister of Social Services and Housing Development for Fishing Community	3 November 2000		
Mervyn Silva		Sri Lanka Freedom Party	Deputy Minister of Labour Relations and Foreign Employment	11 October 2004		
Muthu Sivalingam		Ceylon Workers' Congress	Deputy Minister of Agriculture and Livestock	12 December 2001		
Ranjith Siyambalapitiya		Sri Lanka Freedom Party	Deputy Minister of Finance	10 April 2004	(Note: Continued to hold same office in next cabinet.)	
Sripathi Sooriyarachchi		Sri Lanka Freedom Party	Deputy Minister of Sports and Youth Affairs	10 April 2004		
Gamini Vijith Vijithamuni Soysa		Sri Lanka Freedom Party	Deputy Minister of Mahaweli Development	3 November 2000		
Premaratnage Sumathipala		Sri Lanka Freedom Party	Deputy Minister of Development, Rehabilitation and Reconstruction of the North and North East Tamil Affairs	3 November 2000		
Janaka Bandara Tennakoon		Sri Lanka Freedom Party	Deputy Minister of Health	3 November 2000		
Janaka Bandara Tennakoon		Sri Lanka Freedom Party	Deputy Minister of Livestock Development and Estate Infrastructure	14 September 2001		
Dayasritha Thissera		Sri Lanka Freedom Party	Deputy Minister of Ports and Aviation	10 April 2004		
Pavithra Wanniarachchi		Sri Lanka Freedom Party	Deputy Minister of Highways	14 September 2001		
Gunaratna Weerakoon		Sri Lanka Freedom Party	Deputy Minister of Regional Infrastructure Development	10 April 2004		
Ediriweera Weerawardena		Sri Lanka Freedom Party	Deputy Minister of Development, Rehabilitation and Reconstruction of the East and Rural Housing Development	3 November 2000		
Kumara Welgama		Sri Lanka Freedom Party	Deputy Minister of Transport	3 November 2000		
Kumara Welgama		Sri Lanka Freedom Party	Deputy Minister of Power and Energy	10 April 2004		
Mahinda Wijesekara		United National Party	Deputy Minister of Southern Regional Development	12 December 2001		
Anura Priyadharshana Yapa		Sri Lanka Freedom Party	Deputy Minister of Education and Higher Education	14 September 2001		
