= 11th Parliament of Sri Lanka =

2000–2001 meeting of the Sri Lankan legislature

| ← | 10th | 12th | → |

Overview
- Legislative body: Parliament of Sri Lanka
- Term: 18 October 2000 – 10 October 2001
- Election: 10 October 2000

Senior parliamentarians
- Speaker: Anura Bandaranaike, UNP
- Deputy Speaker and Chairman of Committees: Sarath Moonesinghe, PA
- Deputy Chairman of Committees: Lalith Dissanayake, PA
- Prime Minister: Ratnasiri Wickremanayake, PA
- Leader of the Opposition: Ranil Wickremesinghe, UNP
- Leader of the House: Richard Pathirana, PA
- Chief Government Whip: Reggie Ranatunge, PA
- Chief Opposition Whip: W. J. M. Lokubandara, UNP

Sessions
- 1st: 18 October 2000 – 27 October 2000
- 2nd: 9 November 2000 – 10 July 2001
- 3rd: 6 September 2001 – 10 October 2001

The 11th Parliament of Sri Lanka, known officially as the 4th Parliament of the Democratic Socialist Republic of Sri Lanka, was a meeting of the Parliament of Sri Lanka, with the membership determined by the results of the 2000 parliamentary election held on 10 October 2000. The parliament met for the first time on 18 October 2000 and was dissolved on 10 October 2001.

== Election ==
The 11th parliamentary election was held on 10 October 2000. The incumbent People's Alliance (PA) retained control of parliament by winning 107 of the 225 seats. The United National Party (UNP), the main opposition party, won 89 seats. The Janatha Vimukthi Peramuna (JVP) won 10 seats and smaller parties won the remaining 19 seats.

=== Results ===
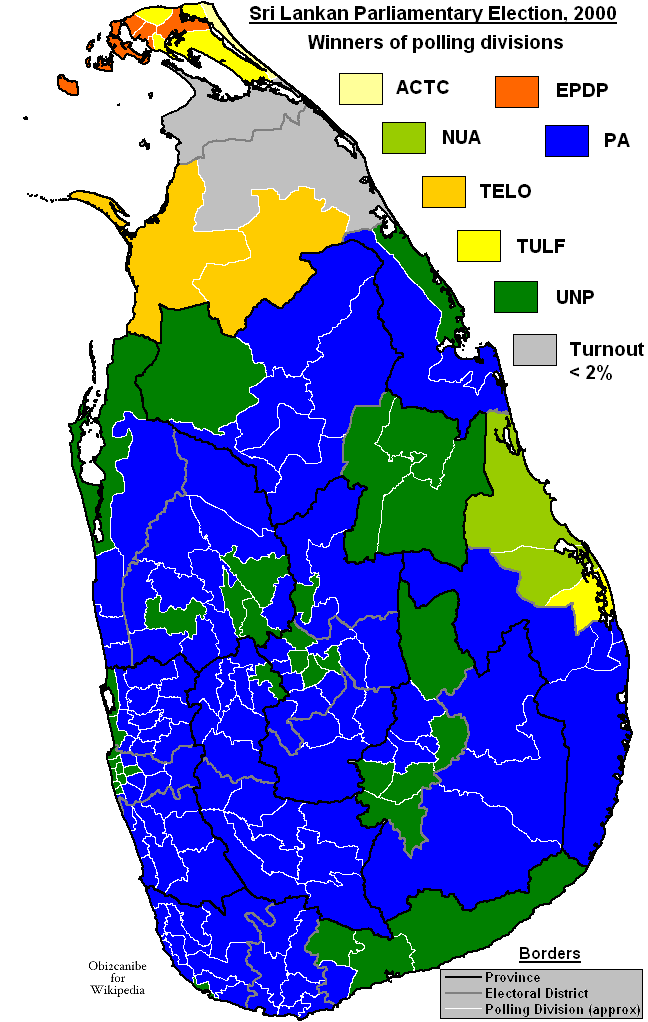
Winners of polling divisions. PA in blue and UNP in green.

| Alliance | Votes | % | Seats |
|---|---|---|---|
| People's Alliance | 3,900,901 | 45.11% | 107 |
| United National Party | 3,477,770 | 40.22% | 89 |
| Janatha Vimukthi Peramuna | 518,774 | 6.00% | 10 |
| Tamil United Liberation Front | 106,033 | 1.23% | 5 |
| National Unity Alliance | 197,983 | 2.29% | 4 |
| Eelam People's Democratic Party | 50,890 | 0.59% | 4 |
| Tamil Eelam Liberation Organization | 26,112 | 0.30% | 3 |
| Sinhala Heritage | 127,863 | 1.48% | 1 |
| All Ceylon Tamil Congress | 27,323 | 0.32% | 1 |
| Democratic People's Liberation Front | 214,019 | 2.47% | 1 |
| Total | 8,647,668 | 100.00% | 225 |

The new parliament was sworn in on 18 October 2000. Opposition MP Anura Bandaranaike was elected Speaker unopposed. Sarath Moonesinghe was elected Deputy Speaker and Lalith Dissanayake was elected Deputy Chairman of Committees.

== Government ==
The PA was able to form a government with the support of the four NUA MPs elected under their party's name (the NUA contested with the PA in two districts and under its own name in all other districts) and the four EPDP MPs.

On 13 October 2000, President Chandrika Kumaratunga re-appointed Ratnasiri Wickremanayake as Prime Minister. The rest of the government, comprising 40 ministers, was sworn in on 19 October 2000. President Kumaratunga retained control of the important ministries of Defence and Finance. 35 deputy ministers were sworn in on 3 November 2000.

By late 2001, a political crisis engulfed the 11th parliament as several PA MPs defected to the opposition. Faced with losing a vote of no-confidence, President Kumaratunga dissolved parliament on 10 October 2001.

== Changes in party/alliance affiliations ==
The 11th parliament saw the following defections:

- 20 June 2001 – The 11 SLMC/NUA MPs leave the PA government and cross over to the opposition after its leader, Rauff Hakeem, is dismissed from the government. This leaves the PA government without a majority in parliament.
- 9 October 2001 – 1 MEP MP (Bandula Gunawardane) crosses over to the opposition.
- 10 October 2001 – 8 SLFP MPs leave the government and cross over to the opposition.
- 10 October 2001 – 4 CWC MPs leave the government and cross over to the opposition.

== Members ==
=== Deaths and resignations ===
The 11th parliament saw the following deaths and resignations:

- November 2000 – S. B. Nawinne (PA/KUR) resigned to become Chief Minister of the North Western Province. Replaced by T. B. Ekanayake (PA/KUR).
- 14 November 2000 – Mahinda Yapa Abeywardena (PA/MTR) resigned to become Chief Minister of the Southern Province.

=== List ===
| Name | Electoral District | Preference Votes | Member From | Member To | Elected Party | Elected Alliance | Final Party | Final Alliance | Notes |
|---|---|---|---|---|---|---|---|---|---|
| Abeynayake, Piyadasa | RAT | 41,365 | 18 October 2000 | 10 October 2001 | UNP | UNP | UNP | UNP | |
| Abeyratne, P. D. | KAL | 47,271 | 18 October 2000 | 10 October 2001 | UNP | UNP | UNP | UNP | |
| Abeywardena, Lakshman Yapa | MTR | 81,053 | 18 October 2000 | 10 October 2001 | UNP | UNP | UNP | UNP | |
| Abeywardena, Mahinda Yapa | MTR | 70,091 | 18 October 2000 | 14 November 2000 | SLFP | PA | SLFP | PA | Resigned to become Chief Minister of the Southern Province. |
| Abeywardena, Vajira | GAL | 104,483 | 18 October 2000 | 10 October 2001 | UNP | UNP | UNP | UNP | |
| Adaikalanathan, Selvam | VAN | 15,490 | 18 October 2000 | 10 October 2001 | TELO | | TELO | | |
| Alahapperuma, Dullas | MTR | 48,721 | 18 October 2000 | 10 October 2001 | SLFP | PA | SLFP | PA | Deputy Minister of Samurdhi, Rural Development, Parliamentary Affairs & Up-country Development (00-). |
| Aluthgamage, Mahindananda | KAN | 71,653 | 18 October 2000 | 10 October 2001 | SLFP | PA | SLFP | PA | |
| Aluvihare, Alick | MTL | 60,419 | 18 October 2000 | 10 October 2001 | UNP | UNP | UNP | UNP | |
| Aluvihare, Ranjith | MTL | 62,911 | 18 October 2000 | 10 October 2001 | UNP | UNP | UNP | UNP | |
| Amaratunga, John | GAM | 67,104 | 18 October 2000 | 10 October 2001 | UNP | UNP | UNP | UNP | |
| Amunugama, Sarath | KAN | 67,731 | 18 October 2000 | 10 October 2001 | SLFP | PA | SLFP | PA | Minister of Irrigation & Water Resources Management (00-). |
| Anandasangaree, Veerasingham | JAF | 12,888 | 18 October 2000 | 10 October 2001 | TULF | | TULF | | |
| Andrahannadi, Siri | HAM | 39,674 | 18 October 2000 | 10 October 2001 | UNP | UNP | UNP | UNP | |
| Ashraff, Ferial | AMP | 83,353 | 18 October 2000 | 10 October 2001 | SLMC | PA | SLMC | | |
| Athaullah. A. L. M. | AMP | 75,647 | 18 October 2000 | 10 October 2001 | SLMC | PA | SLMC | | |
| Athukorala, Gamini | RAT | 109,102 | 18 October 2000 | 10 October 2001 | UNP | UNP | UNP | UNP | |
| Attanayake, Tissa | KAN | 73,111 | 18 October 2000 | 10 October 2001 | UNP | UNP | UNP | UNP | |
| Azwer, A. H. M. | NAT | | 18 October 2000 | 10 October 2001 | UNP | UNP | UNP | UNP | |
| Bakmeewewa, Nihal | NAT | | 18 October 2000 | 10 October 2001 | UNP | UNP | UNP | UNP | |
| Balasooriya, Arachchilage Jagath | KEG | 45,862 | 18 October 2000 | 10 October 2001 | SLFP | PA | SLFP | PA | Deputy Minister of Urban Development, Construction & Public Utilities (00-). |
| Banda, Gopallawa Moithra Kuda | MTL | 40,397 | 18 October 2000 | 10 October 2001 | SLFP | PA | SLFP | PA | |
| Bandara, Palitha Range | PUT | 40,296 | 18 October 2000 | 10 October 2001 | UNP | UNP | UNP | UNP | |
| Bandara, R. M. Ranjith Madduma | MON | 31,269 | 18 October 2000 | 10 October 2001 | UNP | UNP | UNP | UNP | |
| Bandara, R. M. R. N. | KUR | 49,962 | 18 October 2000 | 10 October 2001 | UNP | UNP | UNP | UNP | |
| Bandara, S. A. R. Madduma | BAD | 47,152 | 18 October 2000 | 10 October 2001 | SLFP | PA | SLFP | PA | |
| Bandaranaike, Anura | GAM | 99,536 | 18 October 2000 | 10 October 2001 | UNP | UNP | UNP | UNP | Speaker (00-01). |
| Bandaranaike, Pandu | GAM | 92,182 | 18 October 2000 | 10 October 2001 | SLFP | PA | SLFP | PA | Deputy Minister of Forestry & Environment (00-). |
| Bogollagama, Rohitha | KUR | 52,095 | 18 October 2000 | 10 October 2001 | UNP | UNP | UNP | UNP | |
| Cader, A. R. M. Abdul | KAN | 58,375 | 18 October 2000 | 10 October 2001 | UNP | UNP | UNP | UNP | |
| Cader, Mohideen Abdul | BAT | 22,975 | 18 October 2000 | 10 October 2001 | SLMC | NUA | SLMC | | Deputy Minister of Fisheries & Aquatic Resources Development (00-). |
| Chandradasa, A. P. G. | AMP | 41,420 | 18 October 2000 | 10 October 2001 | UNP | UNP | UNP | UNP | |
| Chandrasekaran, Periyasamy | NUW | 54,681 | 18 October 2000 | 10 October 2001 | UCPF | UNP | UCPF | UNP | |
| Chandrasiri, Somaweera | NAT | | 18 October 2000 | 10 October 2001 | MEP | PA | MEP | PA | |
| Choksy, K. N. | NAT | | 18 October 2000 | 10 October 2001 | UNP | UNP | UNP | UNP | |
| Collure, Raja | NAT | | 18 October 2000 | 10 October 2001 | CPSL | PA | CPSL | PA | |
| Cooray, Reginold | KAL | 67,945 | 18 October 2000 | 10 October 2001 | SLFP | PA | SLFP | PA | Minister of Ethnic Affairs & National Integration (00-). |
| Dassanayake, D. M. | PUT | 45,700 | 18 October 2000 | 10 October 2001 | SLFP | PA | SLFP | PA | Deputy Minister of Agriculture (00-). |
| Dawood, Basheer Segu | NAT | | 18 October 2000 | 10 October 2001 | SLMC | NUA | SLMC | | |
| Dayaratna, Petikirige | AMP | 47,421 | 18 October 2000 | 10 October 2001 | UNP | UNP | UNP | UNP | |
| Dayaratne, Tudor | KAL | 63,363 | 18 October 2000 | 10 October 2001 | SLFP | PA | SLFP | PA | Deputy Minister of Education (00-). |
| de Mel, Ronnie | NAT | | 18 October 2000 | 10 October 2001 | SLFP | PA | SLFP | PA | Minister of Ports Development & Development of the South (00-). |
| de Mel, Sirinal | NAT | | 18 October 2000 | 10 October 2001 | UNP | UNP | UNP | UNP | |
| de Silva, Nimal Siripala | BAD | 98,917 | 18 October 2000 | 10 October 2001 | SLFP | PA | SLFP | PA | Minister of Posts & Telecommunications (00-). |
| Devananda, Douglas | JAF | 7,658 | 18 October 2000 | 10 October 2001 | EPDP | | EPDP | PA | Minister of Rehabilitation & Reconstruction of the North (00-). |
| Devaraj, P. P. | NAT | | 18 October 2000 | 10 October 2001 | UNP | UNP | UNP | UNP | |
| Dissanayake, Duminda | ANU | 83,949 | 18 October 2000 | 10 October 2001 | SLFP | PA | SLFP | PA | |
| Dissanayake, Lalith | KEG | 40,624 | 18 October 2000 | 10 October 2001 | SLFP | PA | SLFP | PA | Deputy Chairman of Committees (00-01). |
| Dissanayake, Navin | NUW | 55,587 | 18 October 2000 | 10 October 2001 | UNP | UNP | UNP | UNP | |
| Dissanayake, Punchi Banda | ANU | 33,738 | 18 October 2000 | 10 October 2001 | SLFP | PA | SLFP | PA | |
| Dissanayake, S. B. | NUW | 78,903 | 18 October 2000 | 10 October 2001 | SLFP | PA | UNP | UNP | Minister of Samurdhi, Rural Development & Parliamentary Affairs (00-). |
| Dissanayake, Salinda | KUR | 52,727 | 18 October 2000 | 10 October 2001 | SLFP | PA | SLFP | PA | Minister of Land Development & Minor Export Agricultural Crops (00-). |
| Dodangoda, Amarasiri | GAL | 89,149 | 18 October 2000 | 10 October 2001 | SLFP | PA | SLFP | PA | Minister of Vocational Training (00-). |
| Don, A. S. P. | GAM | 52,416 | 18 October 2000 | 10 October 2001 | SLFP | PA | SLFP | PA | |
| Ekanayake, Nandimithra | MTL | 39,585 | 18 October 2000 | 10 October 2001 | SLFP | PA | UNP | UNP | Minister of Provincial Councils & Local Government (00-). |
| Ekanayake, T. B. | KUR | | 9 November 2000 | 10 October 2001 | SLFP | PA | SLFP | PA | Replaces S. B. Nawinne. Deputy Minister of Cultural Affairs (00-). |
| Ekanayake, W. B. | ANU | 41,461 | 18 October 2000 | 10 October 2001 | UNP | UNP | UNP | UNP | |
| Fernando, E. N. U. | COL | 5,717 | 18 October 2000 | 10 October 2001 | JVP | | JVP | | |
| Fernando, Evone Sriyani | PUT | 28,636 | 18 October 2000 | 10 October 2001 | SLFP | PA | SLFP | PA | |
| Fernando, Johnston | KUR | 94,385 | 18 October 2000 | 10 October 2001 | UNP | UNP | UNP | UNP | |
| Fernando, Milroy | PUT | 39,943 | 18 October 2000 | 10 October 2001 | SLFP | PA | SLFP | PA | Minister of Social Services & Fishing Community Housing Development (00-). |
| Fernando, Tyronne | COL | 41,439 | 18 October 2000 | 10 October 2001 | UNP | UNP | UNP | UNP | |
| Fernandopulle, Jeyaraj | GAM | 138,859 | 18 October 2000 | 10 October 2001 | SLFP | PA | SLFP | PA | Minister of Civil Aviation & Airports Development (00-). |
| Fowzie, A. H. M. | COL | 100,200 | 18 October 2000 | 10 October 2001 | SLFP | PA | SLFP | PA | Minister of Highways (00-). |
| Gajadeera, Chandrasiri | MTR | 43,913 | 18 October 2000 | 10 October 2001 | SLFP | PA | SLFP | PA | Deputy Minister of Vocational Training (00-). |
| Galappaththi, Nihal | HAM | 4,654 | 18 October 2000 | 10 October 2001 | JVP | | JVP | | |
| Gamage, Piyasena | GAL | 62,830 | 18 October 2000 | 10 October 2001 | SLFP | PA | SLFP | PA | Deputy Minister of Constitutional Affairs & Industrial Development (00-). |
| Ganeshamoorthy, Somasuntharam | BAT | 9,132 | 18 October 2000 | 10 October 2001 | SLFP | PA | SLFP | PA | Deputy Minister of Ethnic Affairs & National Integration (00-). |
| Gopallawa, Monty | NAT | | 18 October 2000 | 10 October 2001 | SLFP | PA | SLFP | PA | Minister of Cultural Affairs (00-). |
| Gunasegaram, Markandu | AMP | 12,799 | 18 October 2000 | 10 October 2001 | EPDP | IND | EPDP | PA | |
| Gunasekara, Earl | POL | 56,213 | 18 October 2000 | 10 October 2001 | UNP | UNP | UNP | UNP | |
| Gunaserkara, Edward | GAM | 65,157 | 18 October 2000 | 10 October 2001 | UNP | UNP | UNP | UNP | |
| Gunathilake, Nandana | KAL | 5,628 | 18 October 2000 | 10 October 2001 | JVP | | JVP | | |
| Gunawardena, Bandula | COL | 70,537 | 18 October 2000 | 10 October 2001 | MEP | PA | UNP | UNP | |
| Gunawardena, Dinesh | COL | 114,795 | 18 October 2000 | 10 October 2001 | MEP | PA | MEP | PA | |
| Gunawardena, G. L. S. | GAL | 46,656 | 18 October 2000 | 10 October 2001 | UNP | UNP | UNP | UNP | |
| Gunawardena, Indika | COL | 70,341 | 18 October 2000 | 10 October 2001 | SLFP | PA | SLFP | PA | Minister of Higher Education & Information Technology Development (00-). |
| Gunawardana, Leslie | NAT | | 18 October 2000 | 10 October 2001 | LSSP | PA | LSSP | PA | Minister of Science & Technology (00-). |
| Gunawardena, M. K. A. S. | TRI | 15,392 | 18 October 2000 | 10 October 2001 | SLFP | PA | SLFP | PA | |
| Gunawardena, Sarana | GAM | 59,777 | 18 October 2000 | 10 October 2001 | SLFP | PA | SLFP | PA | |
| Hakeem, Rauff | KAN | 28,033 | 18 October 2000 | 10 October 2001 | SLMC | NUA | SLMC | | Minister of Internal & International Trade Commerce, Muslim Religious Affairs & Shipping Development (00-). |
| Haleem, M. H. A. | KAN | 45,177 | 18 October 2000 | 10 October 2001 | UNP | UNP | UNP | UNP | |
| Haneefa, Mohamed | NAT | | 18 October 2000 | 10 October 2001 | SLMC | PA | SLMC | | |
| Harrison, Palisge | ANU | 45,834 | 18 October 2000 | 10 October 2001 | UNP | UNP | UNP | UNP | |
| Heenmahaththaya, U. L. | RAT | 39,285 | 18 October 2000 | 10 October 2001 | SLFP | PA | SLFP | PA | Deputy Minister of Estate Infrastructure & Livestock Development (00-). |
| Herath, H. M. N. | POL | 22,872 | 18 October 2000 | 10 October 2001 | SLFP | PA | SLFP | PA | Deputy Minister of Food & Marketing Development (00-). |
| Herath, Jayarathna | KUR | 61,853 | 18 October 2000 | 10 October 2001 | SLFP | PA | SLFP | PA | |
| Herath, K. M. Nimal | KUR | 3,407 | 18 October 2000 | 10 October 2001 | JVP | | JVP | | |
| Herath, Maheepala | KEG | 61,625 | 18 October 2000 | 10 October 2001 | SLFP | PA | SLFP | PA | Minister of Rural Industrial Development (00-). |
| Herath, Vijitha | GAM | 8,823 | 18 October 2000 | 10 October 2001 | JVP | | JVP | | |
| Jayaratne, D. M. | KAN | 85,711 | 18 October 2000 | 10 October 2001 | SLFP | PA | SLFP | PA | Minister of Agriculture (00-). |
| Jayaratne, Piyankara | PUT | 32,741 | 18 October 2000 | 10 October 2001 | SLFP | PA | SLFP | PA | Deputy Minister of Youth Affairs (00-). |
| Jayasena, Sumedha G. | MON | 33,946 | 18 October 2000 | 10 October 2001 | SLFP | PA | SLFP | PA | Minister of Women's Affairs (00-). |
| Jayasinghe, Chandrani Bandara | ANU | 41,874 | 18 October 2000 | 10 October 2001 | UNP | UNP | UNP | UNP | |
| Jayasuriya, Karu | GAM | 237,387 | 18 October 2000 | 10 October 2001 | UNP | UNP | UNP | UNP | |
| Jayawardena, Jayalath | GAM | 82,730 | 18 October 2000 | 10 October 2001 | UNP | UNP | UNP | UNP | |
| Jayawardena, Lucky | KAN | 42,085 | 18 October 2000 | 10 October 2001 | UNP | UNP | UNP | UNP | |
| Jegatheeswaran, S. K. | NUW | 50,735 | 18 October 2000 | 10 October 2001 | CWC | PA | CWC | | |
| Kadirgamar, Lakshman | NAT | | 18 October 2000 | 10 October 2001 | SLFP | PA | SLFP | PA | Minister of Foreign Affairs (00-). |
| Kanakaraj, K. | NAT | | 18 October 2000 | 10 October 2001 | UNP | UNP | UNP | UNP | |
| Karalliyadde, Tissa | ANU | 48,360 | 18 October 2000 | 10 October 2001 | SLFP | PA | SLFP | PA | Minister of Indigenous Medicine (00-). |
| Karunanayake, Ravi | COL | 145,593 | 18 October 2000 | 10 October 2001 | UNP | UNP | UNP | UNP | |
| Karunathilaka, Gayantha | GAL | 60,728 | 18 October 2000 | 10 October 2001 | UNP | UNP | UNP | UNP | |
| Kathriarachchi, Chandana | COL | 61,301 | 18 October 2000 | 10 October 2001 | SLFP | PA | SLFP | PA | Deputy Minister of Urban Development, Construction & Public Utilities (00-). |
| Katugoda, Jayantha | COL | 39,242 | 18 October 2000 | 10 October 2001 | UNP | UNP | UNP | UNP | |
| Keerthirathna, Sarath | GAM | 77,427 | 18 October 2000 | 10 October 2001 | SLFP | PA | SLFP | PA | Deputy Minister of Agriculture (00-). |
| Kiriella, Lakshman | KAN | 57,424 | 18 October 2000 | 10 October 2001 | SLFP | PA | UNP | UNP | Minister of Tourism & Sports (00-). |
| Kitulagoda, Jinadasa | MTR | 4,012 | 18 October 2000 | 10 October 2001 | JVP | | JVP | | |
| Kodituwakku, Karunasena | COL | 60,318 | 18 October 2000 | 10 October 2001 | UNP | UNP | UNP | UNP | |
| Kuganeswaran, Irasa | VAN | 6,739 | 18 October 2000 | 10 October 2001 | TELO | | TELO | | |
| Kugendran, K. V. | JAF | 4,244 | 18 October 2000 | 10 October 2001 | EPDP | | EPDP | PA | |
| Kularathne, Ananda | HAM | 27,618 | 18 October 2000 | 10 October 2001 | UNP | UNP | UNP | UNP | |
| Kumaranatunga, Jeewan | COL | 88,620 | 18 October 2000 | 10 October 2001 | SLFP | PA | SLFP | PA | Minister of Youth Affairs (00-). |
| Kumarasiri, Ananda | MON | 36,487 | 18 October 2000 | 10 October 2001 | UNP | UNP | UNP | UNP | |
| Lokubandara, W. J. M. | BAD | 75,417 | 18 October 2000 | 10 October 2001 | UNP | UNP | UNP | UNP | Chief Opposition Whip (00-01). |
| Lokuge, Gamini | COL | 58,009 | 18 October 2000 | 10 October 2001 | UNP | UNP | UNP | UNP | |
| Maharoof, Mohamed | TRI | 21,348 | 18 October 2000 | 10 October 2001 | UNP | UNP | UNP | UNP | |
| Maheswaran, Thiagarasah | JAF | 4,807 | 18 October 2000 | 10 October 2001 | UNP | UNP | UNP | UNP | |
| Mahroof, Mohamed | COL | 65,400 | 18 October 2000 | 10 October 2001 | UNP | UNP | UNP | UNP | |
| Majeed, Meerasahibu Abdul | NAT | | 18 October 2000 | 10 October 2001 | UNP | UNP | UNP | UNP | |
| Majeed, M. N. Abdul | TRI | 18,173 | 18 October 2000 | 10 October 2001 | SLFP | PA | SLFP | PA | Deputy Minister of Post & Telecommunications (00-). |
| Markar, Imthiaz Bakeer | KAL | 74,555 | 18 October 2000 | 10 October 2001 | UNP | UNP | UNP | UNP | |
| Marapone, Thilak | NAT | | 18 October 2000 | 10 October 2001 | UNP | UNP | UNP | UNP | |
| Mashoor, Noordeen | VAN | 12,283 | 18 October 2000 | 10 October 2001 | SLMC | NUA | SLMC | | Deputy Minister of Ethnic Affairs & National Integration (00-). |
| Matanarasa, Nadarasa | JAF | 4,673 | 18 October 2000 | 10 October 2001 | EPDP | | EPDP | PA | |
| Mawellage, Keerthi Suranjith | GAL | 51,899 | 18 October 2000 | 10 October 2001 | SLFP | PA | SLFP | PA | |
| Mendis, Wijayapala | NAT | | 18 October 2000 | 10 October 2001 | SLFP | PA | UNP | UNP | Minister Without Portfolio (00-) |
| Mohamed, M. H. | COL | 49,239 | 18 October 2000 | 10 October 2001 | UNP | UNP | UNP | UNP | |
| Mohideen, U. L. M. | AMP | 75,378 | 18 October 2000 | 10 October 2001 | SLMC | PA | SLMC | | |
| Moonesinghe, Ananda | GAM | 48,863 | 18 October 2000 | 10 October 2001 | SLFP | PA | UNP | UNP | |
| Moonesinghe, Sarath | KUR | 51,230 | 18 October 2000 | 10 October 2001 | SLFP | PA | SLFP | PA | Deputy Speaker & Chairman of Committees (00-01). |
| Moragoda, Milinda | NAT | | 18 October 2000 | 10 October 2001 | UNP | UNP | UNP | UNP | |
| Moulana, Seyed Ali Zahir | BAT | 14,284 | 18 October 2000 | 10 October 2001 | UNP | UNP | UNP | UNP | |
| Mowlana, Alavi | NAT | | 18 October 2000 | 10 October 2001 | SLFP | PA | SLFP | PA | Minister of Labour (00-). |
| Nanayakkara, Hemakumara | GAL | 70,231 | 18 October 2000 | 10 October 2001 | UNP | UNP | UNP | UNP | |
| Nawarathna, Ranjith | KUR | 49,174 | 18 October 2000 | 10 October 2001 | SLFP | PA | SLFP | PA | |
| Nawinne, S. B. | KUR | 81,259 | 18 October 2000 | | SLFP | PA | SLFP | PA | Resigned to become Chief Minister of the North Western Province. Replaced by T. B. Ekanayake. |
| Nelson, H. G. P. | POL | 31,241 | 18 October 2000 | 10 October 2001 | UNP | UNP | UNP | UNP | |
| Noharathalingam, Vino | VAN | 10,959 | 18 October 2000 | 10 October 2001 | TELO | | TELO | | |
| Padmasiri, K. H. G. N. | GAL | 46,600 | 18 October 2000 | 10 October 2001 | SLFP | PA | SLFP | PA | Deputy Minister of Plantation Industries (00-). |
| Pararajasingham, Joseph | BAT | 12,605 | 18 October 2000 | 10 October 2001 | TULF | | TULF | | |
| Pathirana, Richard | GAL | 114,658 | 18 October 2000 | 10 October 2001 | SLFP | PA | SLFP | PA | Leader of the House (00-01). Minister of Public Administration, Home Affairs & Administrative Reforms (00-). |
| Peiris, G. L. | COL | 139,123 | 18 October 2000 | 10 October 2001 | SLFP | PA | UNP | UNP | Minister of Constitutional Affairs & Industrial Development (00-). |
| Perera, Dilan | BAD | 38,415 | 18 October 2000 | 10 October 2001 | SLFP | PA | SLFP | PA | |
| Perera, Felix | GAM | 96,222 | 18 October 2000 | 10 October 2001 | SLFP | PA | SLFP | PA | Deputy Minister of Power & Energy (00-). |
| Perera, Festus | PUT | 45,513 | 18 October 2000 | 10 October 2001 | UNP | UNP | UNP | UNP | |
| Perera, Gamini Jayawickrama | KUR | 123,847 | 18 October 2000 | 10 October 2001 | UNP | UNP | UNP | UNP | |
| Perera, Joseph Michael | GAM | 59,646 | 18 October 2000 | 10 October 2001 | UNP | UNP | UNP | UNP | |
| Perera, Lilantha | COL | 48,848 | 18 October 2000 | 10 October 2001 | UNP | UNP | UNP | UNP | |
| Perera, Neomal | PUT | 49,207 | 18 October 2000 | 10 October 2001 | UNP | UNP | UNP | UNP | |
| Piyasena, Upali | KUR | 54,756 | 18 October 2000 | 10 October 2001 | UNP | UNP | UNP | UNP | |
| Podinilame, Jayathilaka | KEG | 48,504 | 18 October 2000 | 10 October 2001 | UNP | UNP | UNP | UNP | |
| Premachandra, B. L. | COL | 62,237 | 18 October 2000 | 10 October 2001 | SLFP | PA | SLFP | PA | |
| Premachandra, Munidasa | KUR | 48,905 | 18 October 2000 | 10 October 2001 | SLFP | PA | SLFP | PA | Deputy Minister of Highways (00-). |
| Premadasa, Champika | KEG | 47,342 | 18 October 2000 | 10 October 2001 | UNP | UNP | UNP | UNP | |
| Premadasa, Sajith | HAM | 98,968 | 18 October 2000 | 10 October 2001 | UNP | UNP | UNP | UNP | |
| Premajayanth, Susil | GAM | 165,905 | 18 October 2000 | 10 October 2001 | SLFP | PA | SLFP | PA | Minister of Education (00-). |
| Premaratne, D. S. S. | ANU | 35,800 | 18 October 2000 | 10 October 2001 | SLFP | PA | SLFP | PA | |
| Premaratne, Ediriweera | KAL | 53,690 | 18 October 2000 | 10 October 2001 | SLFP | PA | UNP | UNP | Deputy Minister of Buddha Sasana & Religious Affairs (00-). |
| Punchihewa, Santhakumara | VAN | 3,975 | 18 October 2000 | 10 October 2001 | UNP | UNP | UNP | UNP | |
| Punchinilame, Susantha | RAT | 77,197 | 18 October 2000 | 10 October 2001 | UNP | UNP | UNP | UNP | |
| Rajapaksa, Chamal | HAM | 66,737 | 18 October 2000 | 10 October 2001 | SLFP | PA | SLFP | PA | Deputy Minister of Ports Development & Development of the South (00-). |
| Rajapaksa, Mahinda | HAM | 88,726 | 18 October 2000 | 10 October 2001 | SLFP | PA | SLFP | PA | Minister of Fisheries & Aquatic Resources Development (00-). |
| Rajapaksha, Suranimala | GAM | 49,697 | 18 October 2000 | 10 October 2001 | UNP | UNP | UNP | UNP | |
| Rambukwella, Keheliya | KAN | 154,403 | 18 October 2000 | 10 October 2001 | UNP | UNP | UNP | UNP | |
| Ranatunga, Reggie | GAM | 79,510 | 18 October 2000 | 10 October 2001 | SLFP | PA | SLFP | PA | Chief Government Whip (00-01). Minister of Food & Marketing Development (00-). |
| Ranaweera, Jayatissa | RAT | 38,631 | 18 October 2000 | 10 October 2001 | SLFP | PA | SLFP | PA | Deputy Minister of Land Development & Minor Export Agriculture (00-). |
| Randeniya, Ravindra | NAT | | 18 October 2000 | 10 October 2001 | UNP | UNP | UNP | UNP | |
| Rathnayake, R. M. | BAD | 38,997 | 18 October 2000 | 10 October 2001 | UNP | UNP | UNP | UNP | |
| Ratnatilaka, Mahinda | RAT | 49,808 | 18 October 2000 | 10 October 2001 | UNP | UNP | UNP | UNP | |
| Ratnayaka, Sagala | MTR | 58,634 | 18 October 2000 | 10 October 2001 | UNP | UNP | UNP | UNP | |
| Ratnayake, Amara Piyaseeli | KUR | 51,498 | 18 October 2000 | 10 October 2001 | UNP | UNP | UNP | UNP | |
| Ratwatte, Anuruddha | KAN | 152,511 | 18 October 2000 | 10 October 2001 | SLFP | PA | SLFP | PA | Minister of Power & Energy (00-). |
| Rupasinghe, Neil | GAM | 51,500 | 18 October 2000 | 10 October 2001 | SLFP | PA | SLFP | PA | Deputy Minister of Labour (00-). |
| Samarasinghe, Mahinda | KAL | 82,511 | 18 October 2000 | 10 October 2001 | UNP | UNP | UNP | UNP | |
| Samaraweera, Mangala | MTR | 93,110 | 18 October 2000 | 10 October 2001 | SLFP | PA | SLFP | PA | Minister of Urban Development, Construction & Public Utilities (00-). |
| Samaraweera, Ravindra | BAD | 44,257 | 18 October 2000 | 10 October 2001 | UNP | UNP | UNP | UNP | |
| Samaraweera, Upali | BAD | 45,839 | 18 October 2000 | 10 October 2001 | UNP | UNP | UNP | UNP | |
| Sangaran, Kandiah | JAF | 2,902 | 18 October 2000 | 10 October 2001 | EPDP | | EPDP | PA | |
| Sathasiwam, Suppiah | NUW | 47,472 | 18 October 2000 | 10 October 2001 | UNP | UNP | UNP | UNP | |
| Soundranayagam, Ashley | BAT | 16,542 | 18 October 2000 | 7 November 2000 | TULF | | TULF | | |
| Sellasamy, M. S. | NAT | | 18 October 2000 | 10 October 2001 | NWC | UNP | NWC | UNP | |
| Semasinghe, H. B. | ANU | 35,090 | 18 October 2000 | 10 October 2001 | SLFP | PA | SLFP | PA | Minister of Co operative Development (00-). |
| Senanayake, Rukman | POL | 27,200 | 18 October 2000 | 10 October 2001 | UNP | UNP | UNP | UNP | |
| Senaratne, Rajitha | KAL | 73,382 | 18 October 2000 | 10 October 2001 | UNP | UNP | UNP | UNP | |
| Senathirajah, Mavai | JAF | 10,965 | 18 October 2000 | 10 October 2001 | TULF | | TULF | | |
| Senewiratne, Athauda | KEG | 76,510 | 18 October 2000 | 10 October 2001 | SLFP | PA | SLFP | PA | |
| Senewiratne, John | RAT | 86,744 | 18 October 2000 | 10 October 2001 | SLFP | PA | SLFP | PA | Minister of Health (00-). |
| Senewiratne, Lakshman | BAD | 51,382 | 18 October 2000 | 10 October 2001 | UNP | UNP | UNP | UNP | |
| Silva, Maddumage Samson | COL | 38,894 | 18 October 2000 | 10 October 2001 | UNP | UNP | UNP | UNP | |
| Sinnalebbe, Rizzwi | NAT | | 18 October 2000 | 10 October 2001 | SLMC | PA | SLMC | | |
| Sirisena, Maithripala | POL | 57,072 | 18 October 2000 | 10 October 2001 | SLFP | PA | SLFP | PA | Minister of Mahaweli Development (00-). |
| Sirisena, R. A. D. | KEG | 43,002 | 18 October 2000 | 10 October 2001 | UNP | UNP | UNP | UNP | |
| Sivalingam, Muthu | NUW | 55,673 | 18 October 2000 | 10 October 2001 | CWC | PA | CWC | | |
| Sivamaharajah, Sinnathamby | JAF | 7,187 | 18 October 2000 | 10 October 2001 | TULF | | TULF | | |
| Siyambalapitiya, Ranjith | KEG | 49,582 | 18 October 2000 | 10 October 2001 | SLFP | PA | SLFP | PA | |
| Soyza, Vijith Wijayamuni | MON | 37,312 | 18 October 2000 | 10 October 2001 | SLFP | PA | SLFP | PA | Deputy Minister of Mahaweli Development (00-). |
| Sumathipala, Premaratnage | VAN | 5,205 | 18 October 2000 | 10 October 2001 | SLFP | PA | SLFP | PA | Deputy Minister of Development Rehabilitation & Reconstruction of the North & Tamil Affairs, North & East (00-). |
| Suranganie, Ellawala | RAT | 54,517 | 18 October 2000 | 10 October 2001 | SLFP | PA | SLFP | PA | |
| Tennakoon, Janaka Bandara | MTL | 42,366 | 18 October 2000 | 10 October 2001 | SLFP | PA | SLFP | PA | Deputy Minister of Health (00-). |
| Tennakoon, Kumari | KUR | 49,476 | 18 October 2000 | 10 October 2001 | SLFP | PA | SLFP | PA | |
| Thissera, Dayasritha | PUT | 38,885 | 18 October 2000 | 10 October 2001 | SLFP | PA | SLFP | PA | |
| Thondaman, Arumugan | NUW | 61,779 | 18 October 2000 | 10 October 2001 | CWC | PA | CWC | | Minister of Estate Infrastructure & Livestock Development (00-). |
| Thowfeek, M. S. | TRI | 15,588 | 18 October 2000 | 10 October 2001 | SLMC | PA | SLMC | | |
| Umma, Anjan | NAT | | 18 October 2000 | 10 October 2001 | JVP | | JVP | | |
| Vinayagamoorthy, Appathurai | JAF | 3,825 | 18 October 2000 | 10 October 2001 | ACTC | | ACTC | | |
| Wanniarachchi, A. D. | RAT | 39,972 | 18 October 2000 | 10 October 2001 | SLFP | PA | SLFP | PA | |
| Wanniarachchi, Pavithra Devi | RAT | 108,324 | 18 October 2000 | 10 October 2001 | SLFP | PA | SLFP | PA | Minister of Plan Implementation (00-). |
| Wedaarachchi, Dilip | HAM | 43,949 | 18 October 2000 | 10 October 2001 | UNP | UNP | UNP | UNP | |
| Weerakoon, Athula Indika | GAL | 2,664 | 18 October 2000 | 10 October 2001 | JVP | | JVP | | |
| Weerakoon, Batty | NAT | | 18 October 2000 | 10 October 2001 | LSSP | PA | LSSP | PA | Minister of Justice (00-). |
| Weerawansa, Wimal | COL | 13,284 | 18 October 2000 | 10 October 2001 | JVP | | JVP | | |
| Weerawardena, Ediriweera | KAN | 35,388 | 18 October 2000 | 10 October 2001 | SLFP | PA | SLFP | PA | Deputy Minister of Development Rehabilitation & Reconstruction of the East & Rural Housing Development (00-). |
| Welgama, Kumara | KAL | 60,394 | 18 October 2000 | 10 October 2001 | SLFP | PA | SLFP | PA | Deputy Minister of Transport (00-). |
| Wickremanayake, Ratnasiri | KAL | 148,705 | 18 October 2000 | 10 October 2001 | SLFP | PA | SLFP | PA | Prime Minister (00-01). Minister of Buddha Sasana Religious Affairs & Plantation Industries (00-). |
| Wickremasinghe, Ranil | COL | 363,668 | 18 October 2000 | 10 October 2001 | UNP | UNP | UNP | UNP | Leader of the Opposition (00-01). |
| Wijekoon, Jayasundara | MON | 33,784 | 18 October 2000 | 10 October 2001 | SLFP | PA | UNP | UNP | |
| Wijesekara, Mahinda | MTR | 83,625 | 18 October 2000 | 10 October 2001 | SLFP | PA | UNP | UNP | Minister of Forestry & Environment (00-). |
| Wijeyeratne, Mano | KEG | 41,069 | 18 October 2000 | 10 October 2001 | UNP | UNP | UNP | UNP | |
| Wimalasena, Daham | NAT | | 18 October 2000 | 10 October 2001 | UNP | UNP | UNP | UNP | |
| Dissanayake, Wimalaweera | AMP | 27,677 | 18 October 2000 | 10 October 2001 | SLFP | PA | SLFP | PA | |
| Yapa, Anura Priyadharshana | KUR | 60,479 | 18 October 2000 | 10 October 2001 | SLFP | PA | SLFP | PA | Minister of Information & Media (00-). |
| Yogarajan, Ramaiah | NAT | | 18 October 2000 | 10 October 2001 | CWC | PA | CWC | | |
| Corea, Harindra | NAT | | 18 October 2000 | 10 October 2001 | SLFP | PA | UNP | UNP | |
| Anura Kumara Dissanayake | NAT | | 18 October 2000 | 10 October 2001 | JVP | | JVP | | |
| Karunarathna, Thilak | NAT | | 18 October 2000 | ? | SH | | SH | | |
| Ranawaka, Patalee Champika | NAT | | ? | 10 October 2001 | SH | | SH | | |
