= List of chief ministers of North Western Province =

Chief Minister of North Western Province
- Flag of North Western Province, Sri Lanka
- Incumbent; Dharmasiri Dassanayake since 8 September 2015
- Board of Ministers of the North Western Province
- Style: The Honourable
- Member of: North Western Provincial Council
- Appointer: Amara Piyaseeli Ratnayake
- Inaugural holder: Gamini Jayawickrama Perera
- Formation: 3 February 1988
- Website: Chief Ministry, North Western Province

The chief minister of North Western Province, Sri Lanka is the head of the provincial board of ministers, a body which aids and advises the governor, the head of the provincial government, in the exercise of his executive power. The governor appoints as chief minister the member of the North Western Provincial Council who, in his opinion, commands the support of a majority of that council. The current chief minister is Dharmasiri Dassanayake.

== Chief ministers ==
Sri Lanka Freedom Party United National Party Democratic United National Front

No.	Name	Portrait	Party	Took office	Left office	Refs
1	Gamini Jayawickrama Perera		United National Party	4 May 1988	19 October 1993	
2	G. M. Premachandra		Democratic United National Front	19 October 1993	27 August 1994	
3	Nimal Bandara		United National Party	27 August 1994	28 January 1999	
4	S. B. Nawinne		Sri Lanka Freedom Party	28 January 1999	2002	
5	Athula Wijesinghe		Sri Lanka Freedom Party	2002	3 October 2013	
6	Dayasiri Jayasekara		Sri Lanka Freedom Party	3 October 2013	8 September 2015	
7	Dharmasiri Dassanayake		Sri Lanka Freedom Party	8 September 2015		
