= Gamini Jayawickrama Perera =

Sri Lankan politician (1941–2024)

The Honourable Gamini Jayawickrama Perera

Minister of Buddha Sasana
- In office 20 December 2018 – 21 November 2019
- President: Maithripala Sirisena
- Prime Minister: Ranil Wickremesinghe
- Preceded by: Udaya Gammanpila
- Succeeded by: Mahinda Rajapaksa (Note: As Minister of Buddha Sasana, Cultural and Religious Affairs)
- In office 25 August 2017 – 26 October 2018
- President: Maithripala Sirisena
- Prime Minister: Ranil Wickremesinghe
- Preceded by: Wijeyadasa Rajapakshe
- Succeeded by: Udaya Gammanpila (Note: As Minister of Buddha Sasana and Religious Affairs)

Minister of Wayamba Development
- In office 20 December 2018 – 21 November 2019
- President: Maithripala Sirisena
- Prime Minister: Ranil Wickremesinghe
- Preceded by: S. B. Nawinne (Note: As Minister of Internal Affairs, Wayamba Development and Cultural Affairs)
- Succeeded by: Vacant

Minister of Sustainable Development and Wildlife
- In office 4 September 2015 – 25 February 2018
- President: Maithripala Sirisena
- Prime Minister: Ranil Wickremesinghe
- Preceded by: Gamini Vijith Vijithamuni Soysa (Note: As Minister of Wildlife Conservation)
- Succeeded by: Sarath Fonseka (Note: As Minister of Sustainable Development, Wildlife and Regional Development)

Minister of Food Security
- In office 12 January 2015 – 17 August 2015
- President: Maithripala Sirisena
- Prime Minister: Ranil Wickremesinghe
- Preceded by: P. Dayaratna (Note: As Senior Minister of Food and Nutrition)
- Succeeded by: Chamal Rajapaksa (Note: As Minister of Internal Trade, Food Security and Consumer Welfare) (Note: Position vacant from 17 August 2015 to 22 November 2019.)

Minister of Irrigation and Water Management
- In office 12 December 2001 – 4 November 2003
- President: Chandrika Kumaratunga
- Prime Minister: Ranil Wickremesinghe
- Preceded by: Sarath Amunugama (Note: As Minister of Irrigation and Water Resources Management.)
- Succeeded by: Ferial Ashraff (Note: As Minister of Housing and Construction Industry, Eastern Province Education and Irrigation Development.)

1st Chief Minister of the North Western Province
- In office 4 May 1988 – 19 October 1993
- Governor: Dingiri Banda Wijetunga; Montague Jayawickrama
- Preceded by: Office established
- Succeeded by: G. M. Premachandra

Member of Parliament for Kurunegala District
- In office 25 August 1994 – 3 March 2020

Member of Parliament for Katugampola
- In office 22 July 1977 – 8 March 1989
- Preceded by: Tikiri Banda Subasinghe
- Succeeded by: Constituency abolished

Personal details
- Born: Mallawa Arachchige Gamini Jayawickrama Perera; 29 January 1941 Kurunegala, British Ceylon
- Died: 17 February 2024 (aged 83) Kurunegala, Sri Lanka
- Party: United National Party
- Spouse: Rohini Perera
- Relations: Lincoln Perera (brother)
- Children: 2
- Education: Nalanda College Colombo
- Occupation: Politician

Mallawa Arachchige Gamini Jayawickrama Perera (Sinhala: ගාමිණී ජයවික්‍රම පෙරේරා, Tamil: காமினி ஜெயவிக்கிரம பெரேரா; 29 January 1941 – 17 February 2024) was a Sri Lankan politician. He was a United National Party member of the Parliament of Sri Lanka for the Kurunegala District between 1994 and 2020, and had previously represented Katugampola in the National State Assembly from 1977 to 1989. Perera served many cabinet positions in various Sri Lankan governments, including being the Minister of Buddha Sasana, Minister of Wayamba Development, Minister of Sustainable Development and Wildlife, Minister of Food Security and the Minister of Irrigation and Water Management. Perera also briefly left national politics to become the Chief Minister of the North Western Province and serve in the North Western Provincial Council. Perera helped represent Sri Lanka's interests internationally as the chairman of United Nations Economic and Social Commission for Asia and the Pacific, a position he was elected to in April 2016. Furthermore, he held the position of chairman of the United National Party during a significant period of his career.

== Early life ==
Perera was born on 29 January 1941 in Kurunegala in the North Western Province. He came from a large family, with one of his brothers being Lincoln Perera, who later served as the Secretary of the Ministry of Plantation Industries. He received his primary and secondary education at Nalanda College in Colombo.

An ardent cricket enthusiast, Perera actively participated in the sport during his school years. He was a member of the college's first XI team and eventually became its captain. He led the team in the Battle of the Maroons big match against Ananda College in 1960, which ended in a draw.

== Political career ==
Perera's political career began in 1968 when as a member of the United National Party he began to participate in local government politics. He quickly rose through the ranks of the party, attracting the attention of the party leadership, which enlisted him into national politics in 1973.

In the 1977 elections, which saw a resounding victory for the UNP, he secured his initial parliamentary seat representing the Katugampola constituency. Subsequently in 1982, then President J. R. Jayewardene appointed Perera to the position of District Minister of Kurunegala in his cabinet.

With the advent of the Indo-Sri Lanka Accord and the establishment of Provincial Councils in Sri Lanka, Perera briefly left national politics to pursue a role in regional governance. In 1988, he contested and triumphed in the provincial council elections for the North Western Province, and as a result, he became the inaugural Chief Minister of the North Western Province.

Returning to national politics in the 1994 elections, Perera emerged victorious from the Kurunegala District. Throughout much of his tenure in parliament, he found himself situated on the opposition benches, apart from a brief interlude when he served as Minister of Irrigation and Water Management under the Chandrika Kumaratunga administration in 2001. These dynamics of his political involvement experienced a shift with the election of Maithripala Sirisena in 2015 and the establishment of a UNP-led administration. During this period, Perera assumed various ministerial portfolios, including the Minister of Food Security, the Minister of Sustainable Development and Wildlife, and the Minister of Buddha Sasana.

Following a constitutional crisis in 2018, Perera and his colleagues in the sitting administration faced temporary dismissal from their governmental posts under the short-lived Sirisena-Rajapaksa-led government. However, subsequent no confidence motions and Supreme Court rulings led to their reinstatement. Perera resumed his duties as Minister of Buddha Sasana and was additionally entrusted with the portfolio of Minister of Wayamba Development. However, following the election of Gotabaya Rajapaksa in 2019 and the formation of a Sri Lanka Podujana Peramuna (SLPP)-led government, he opted to depart from governmental responsibilities and chose not to seek re-election in 2020.

In 2021, he deviated from the party line by openly criticizing UNP leader Ranil Wickremesinghe. Perera alleged that Wickremesinghe was attempting to broker a deal with the then-incumbent SLPP-led government. Furthermore, he lamented the significant losses suffered by the UNP in the 2020 parliamentary elections.

== Personal life ==
Perera married Rohini Perera and they had two children, with one of his children being a former Provincial Council member, Asanga Jayawickrama Perera. He was a devout Buddhist.

=== Death ===
Perera died on 17 February 2024, at the age of 83 in his residence situated in Kurunegala. He had been seriously ill for some time at the time of his death.

Perera's funeral took place on 20 February 2024, at the Pannala Stadium grounds in Pannala, Kurunegala District.
