= SLMC =

SLMC may refer to:

- Sri Lanka Medical Council
- Sri Lanka Muslim Congress
- St. Luke's Medical Center
- Second Life Military Combat
