= Pavithra Wanniarachchi =

Sri Lankan politician

Hon. Pavithra Wanniarachchi
- පවිත්‍රා වන්නිආරච්චි பவித்ரா வன்னியாராச்சி

Minister of Wildlife and Forest Conservation
- In office 19 January 2023 – 24 September 2024
- President: Ranil Wickremesinghe
- Prime Minister: Dinesh Gunawardena
- Preceded by: Mahinda Amaraweera

Minister of Transport
- In office 16 August 2021 – 3 April 2022
- President: Gotabaya Rajapaksa
- Prime Minister: Mahinda Rajapaksa
- Preceded by: Gamini Lokuge
- Succeeded by: Dilum Amunugama

Minister of Health (Note: Minister of Healthcare and Indigenous Medical Services from 22 November 2019 to 12 August 2020.)
- In office 22 November 2019 – 16 August 2021
- President: Gotabaya Rajapaksa
- Prime Minister: Mahinda Rajapaksa
- Preceded by: Rajitha Senaratne
- Succeeded by: Keheliya Rambukwella

Minister of Women and Child Affairs and Social Security
- In office 22 November 2019 – 12 August 2020
- President: Gotabaya Rajapaksa
- Prime Minister: Mahinda Rajapaksa
- Preceded by: Rajitha Senaratne
- Succeeded by: Keheliya Rambukwella

Minister of Power and Energy
- In office 28 January 2013 – 12 January 2015
- President: Mahinda Rajapaksa
- Prime Minister: D. M. Jayaratne
- Preceded by: Champika Ranawaka
- Succeeded by: Champika Ranawaka

Minister of Technology and Research
- In office 22 November 2010 – 28 January 2013
- President: Mahinda Rajapaksa
- Prime Minister: D. M. Jayaratne
- Preceded by: Tissa Vitharana
- Succeeded by: Champika Ranawaka

Minister of National Heritage and Cultural Affairs
- In office 23 April 2010 – 22 November 2010
- President: Gotabaya Rajapaksa
- Prime Minister: Mahinda Rajapaksa
- Preceded by: Anura Bandaranaike (2007) (Note: This position was vacant from December 14, 2007, until April 23, 2010.)
- Succeeded by: Jagath Balasuriya

Minister of Youth Affairs
- In office 28 January 2007 – 23 April 2010
- President: Gotabaya Rajapaksa
- Prime Minister: Mahinda Rajapaksa
- Preceded by: Jeewan Kumaranatunga (Note: As Minister of Sports & Youth Affairs)
- Succeeded by: Dullas Alahapperuma

Minister of Samurdhi and Poverty Alleviation
- In office 10 April 2004 – 28 January 2007
- President: Chandrika Kumaratunga; Mahinda Rajapaksa
- Prime Minister: Mahinda Rajapaksa; Ratnasiri Wickremanayake
- Preceded by: Chandrika Kumaratunga
- Succeeded by: Sajith Premadasa (2015) (Note: This position was vacant from January 28, 2007, until January 12, 2015.) (Note: As Minister of Housing & Samurdhi)

Minister of Plan Implementation
- In office 19 October 2000 – 12 December 2001
- President: Chandrika Kumaratunga
- Prime Minister: Ratnasiri Wickramanayake; Ranil Wickremesinghe
- Preceded by: Office established
- Succeeded by: Petikirige Dayaratna (2007) (Note: This position was vacant from December 12, 2001, until January 28, 2007.)

Minister of State for Petroleum Resources Development
- In office 7 November 2018 – 15 December 2018
- President: Maithripala Sirisena
- Prime Minister: Mahinda Rajapaksa
- Minister: Gamini Lokuge
- Preceded by: Arjuna Ranatunga (Note: As Minister of Petroleum Resources Development)
- Succeeded by: Kabir Hashim (Note: As Minister of Highways, Road Development and Petroleum Resources Development)

Deputy Minister of Highways
- In office 14 September 2001 – 10 April 2004
- President: Chandrika Kumaratunga
- Prime Minister: Ratnasiri Wickramanayake; Mahinda Rajapakse
- Minister: Gamini Atukorale
- Preceded by: Munidasa Premachandra
- Succeeded by: T. B. Ekanayake

Member of Parliament for Ratnapura District
- Incumbent
- Assumed office 25 August 1994

Personal details
- Born: Pavithradevi Wanniarachchi; 10 November 1964 (age 61)
- Party: Sri Lanka Freedom Party
- Other political affiliations: United People's Freedom Alliance
- Spouse: Kanchana Jayaratne
- Occupation: Lawyer

Pavithradevi Wanniarachchi (born 10 November 1964 Sinhala: පවිත්‍රා දේවි වන්නිආරච්චි) is a Sri Lankan lawyer, politician and former cabinet minister. She is a Member of Parliament from the Ratnapura District.

== Early life and education ==
Pavithradevi Wanniarachchi was born on 10 November 1964, as the eldest daughter of Dharmadasa Wanniarachchi and Podi Menike Weerasekera Wanniarachchi. Her father was a senior politician who served as the 7th Governor of the North Western Province from 2004 until his death in 2007 and a member of Parliament from 1967 to 1977 and from 2000 to 2001. She has one sister, Prasanna Devi Wanniarachchi, who is a lawyer.

Wanniarachchi attended the Pelmadulla Mahinda Vidyalaya for her primary education. She then entered Gankanda Central College and Anula Vidyalaya Nugegoda for her secondary education. She was the Head Prefect, leader of the debating team, president of the Buddhist Association, Member of the Western band and the Captain of the 1st Volleyball Team of Anula Vidyalaya. She then entered Sri Lanka Law College in 1985 and took oaths as an attorney of law of the Supreme Court of Sri Lanka five years later.

== Political career ==
In 1990 she entered politics on the invitation of the former Prime Minister Sirimavo Bandaranaike. In 1991 she was appointed as the chief organizer for Kalawana. She then became a member of the Sabaragamuwa Provincial Council in 1993 and in 1994 she entered Parliament as an MP representing the Ratnapura District.

After entering politics, she has held many posts both in the local and central governments. In 1994 she held the post of Deputy Minister of Health, Highways, Social Services and Welfare and in 1998 the post of Deputy Minister of Health & Indigenous Medicine. In the year 2000 she was elected as the Deputy Secretary of the Sri Lanka Freedom Party, the Leader of the Women's wing of the Sri Lanka Freedom Party and Minister of Plan and Implementation.

In 2002, while she was serving as the organiser of the Eheliyagoda seat for SLFP in 2008, she was appointed as the Chairman of the Commonwealth Youth Ministers Convention and also served as the Minister for Youth Affairs.

Between 2004 and 2015 she held many posts while the SLFP lead coalition was in power. In 2004 she was appointed Minister of Samurdhi & Poverty Alleviation, in 2007 Minister of Youth Affairs, 2010 she was appointed as the Minister of Cultural and National Heritage and later that year as the Minister of Technology and Atomic Research.

In the periods between 2001–2004 and 2015–2019 she was an active member of the opposition of the Parliament.

From 2019 she was appointed as the Minister of Women & Child Affairs, Social Security, Health & Indigenous Medicine in government headed by the new President Gotabhaya Rajapaksa.

=== Post Held ===
- Minister of Women & Child Affairs, Social Security, Health & Indigenous Medicine: 2019–Present
- Minister of Power & Energy: 2013 - 2015
- Minister of Technology & Research 2010 - 2013
- Minister of Cultural Affairs & National Heritage: 2010
- Chairman of Commonwealth Youth Ministers Convention: 2008
- Minister of Youth Affairs: 2007 - 2010
- Minister of Samurdhi & Poverty Alleviation: 2004 - 2007
- Minister of Plan & Implementation: 2000 - 2001
- Deputy Minister of Health & Indigenous Medicine: 1998 - 2000
- Deputy Minister of Health, Highways, Social Services & Welfare: 1994 - 1998
- Member of the Parliament for Ratnapura District: 1994–Present
- Member of the Sabaragamuwa Provincial Council: 1993 - 1994

=== Other Responsibilities ===
- Deputy Secretary of the SLFP: 2000 onwards
- Leader of the SLFP Women's Wing: 2000 onwards
- Chief Organizer of the Eheliyagoda Seat for the SLFP: 2002 onwards
- Chief Organizer of the Kalawana Seat of the SLFP: 1991 to 2002

== Family ==
Pavithra Wanniarachchi's husband is Kanchana Jayaratne, who is the Chairman of the Sabaragamuwa Provincial Council and also serves as her Private Secretary. She has two daughters.

== Controversies ==
=== Dismissal of Medical Regulatory Authority Members ===
In March 2021, Health Minister Pavithra Wanniarachchi dismissed five members of the Sri Lanka Medical Council (SLMC), including its President, Prof. Harendra De Silva. This action followed allegations from the Government Medical Officers' Association (GMOA) regarding issues within the council. The move sparked division within the medical community, with debates over the legality and implications of the dismissals.

=== Approval of COVID-19 Vaccines Without Sufficient Data ===
Minister Wanniarachchi faced criticism for approving COVID-19 vaccines, particularly the Chinese Sinopharm vaccine, without comprehensive efficacy and safety data. In April 2021, Consultant Paediatrician Dr. Lakkumar Fernando, a board member of the National Medicines Regulatory Authority (NMRA), was dismissed after opposing the approval due to the lack of data. This decision raised concerns about vaccine safety and the transparency of approval processes.

=== Handling of the COVID-19 Pandemic ===
During the COVID-19 pandemic, Minister Wanniarachchi's administration promoted traditional remedies, such as the "Dhammika Paniya" herbal concoction, as cures for COVID-19. This approach faced ridicule, with critics labeling it as pseudoscience and expressing concerns over its efficacy. The promotion of such remedies, alongside government-endorsed vaccination efforts, highlighted a blend of traditional and modern medical practices in the public health response.

=== Remarks on Crisis Management ===
In March 2022, upon assuming duties as the Minister of Power and Energy, Pavithra Wanniarachchi emphasized that public servants should not evade crises or assign blame. She advocated for collaborative efforts to address challenges, referencing her previous tenure where she transformed the Petroleum Corporation from a loss-incurring entity to a profitable one.

=== De-gazetting of Vidattaltivu Nature Reserve ===
In May 2024, as Minister of Wildlife and Forest Resources Conservation, Pavithra Wanniarachchi controversially decided to remove the protected status of certain areas within the Vidattaltivu Nature Reserve. This action was perceived as paving the way for aquaculture development, raising environmental concerns due to potential ecological degradation.

== See also ==
- List of political families in Sri Lanka
- Cabinet of Sri Lanka
