= Dharmasiri Dassanayake =

Sri Lankan politician

7th Chief Minister of North Western Province
- Incumbent
- Assumed office 8 September 2015
- Preceded by: Dayasiri Jayasekara

Personal details
- Born: Sri Lanka
- Party: Sri Lanka Freedom Party

Dharmasiri Dassanayake is a Sri Lankan politician who is the current Chief Minister of the North Western Province of Sri Lanka. He was appointed to the position on 8 September 2015.
