= Dayasiri Jayasekara =

Sri Lankan politician (born 1969)

Hon. Dayasiri Jayasekara MP
- දයාසිරි පද්මසිරි ජයසෙකර தயாசிறி ஜெயசேகரன்

General Secretary of Sri Lanka Freedom Party
- Incumbent
- Assumed office 3 January 2019
- Chairperson: Maithripala Sirisena
- Preceded by: Rohana Lakshman Piyadasa

Minister for Sport
- In office 4 September 2015 – 12 April 2018
- President: Maithripala Sirisena
- Prime Minister: Ranil Wickremesinghe
- Preceded by: Navin Dissanayake
- Succeeded by: Faiszer Musthapha

6th Chief Minister of North Western Province
- In office 3 October 2013 – 1 September 2015
- Preceded by: Athula Wijesinghe
- Succeeded by: Dharmasiri Dassanayake

Member of Parliament for Kurunegala District
- Incumbent
- Assumed office 2015
- In office 2004 – 24 July 2013

Personal details
- Born: J. P. Dayasiri Jayasekara; 12 June 1969 (age 57) Panduwasnuwara, Dominion of Ceylon
- Party: Sri Lanka Freedom Party (since 2013); United National Party (2001–2013)
- Other political affiliations: Samagi Jana Balawegaya (since 2024)
- Spouse: Jayawanthi Panibharatha
- Relations: Kithsiri Jayasekara (elder brother); Channa Wijewardena (brother-in-law); Upuli Wijewardena (sister-in-law)
- Children: 2
- Education: Mayurapada Central College
- Occupation: Politician
- Profession: Lawyer
- Committees: Committee on Public Accounts
- Website: http://dayasirijayasekara.lk/pages/

J. P. Dayasiri Padma Kumara Jayasekara (born 12 June 1969) is a Sri Lankan politician and Member of Parliament. He is the District Leader of the SLFP for the Kurunegala District and Organizer for the Paduwasnuwara Electorate.

Jayasekara is a Member of Parliament from the Kurunegala District of the North Western Province. Jayasekara is known as an advocate of progressive socio-economic policy. He previously served as Chief Minister of the North Western Province between 2013 and 2015 and as Minister of Sports between 2015 and 2018. He served as the General Secretary of the Sri Lanka Freedom Party from 2019 until his suspension in 2023.

== Personal life ==
Jayasekara was born in Paduwasnuwara, the ancient capital of the Paduwasnuwara Kingdom (one of four Kingdoms in the Kurunegala District, the other three Kingdoms being Kurunegala, Yapahuwa and Dambadeniya), into a family of seven. His father, J. P. Vincent Jayasekara, was a businessman, and his mother, W. D. Siriyawathie was a teacher. Dayasiri is married to Jayawanthi Panibharatha, and the couple has two children, Kaveen Jayasekara and Gihansi Jayasekara. Jayawanthi is the daughter of popular dancer Panibharatha. Jayawanthi's sister, Upuli is married to popular dancer and choreographer Channa Wijewardena.

Dayasiri was educated initially at the Hettipola Primary School from 1974 to 1979. On completion of his primary education he entered Harischandra College in Negombo and in 1980 entered Mayurapada Central College in Narammala until he completed his Advanced Level examination in 1988. At Mayurapada Central College, Dayasiri excelled in number of sporting activities such as athletics and cricket. Furthermore, he ended his schooling career as the Head Prefect.

Completion of his Advanced Level paved the pathway for Jayasekara to enter the law faculty at the University of Colombo, where he graduated in 1994 with a Degree in Bachelor of Laws (LLB). During his time at the University of Colombo he was an active sportsman with colors in athletics, where he was placed first in discuss throwing, a classy ruggerite, winner of the inter university Kabaddi team and Captain of the Law Faculty Cricket Team. Furthermore, he was active in forming a university singing band, model and television actor.

Jayasekara was the founding leader of the Law Student Partnership Association in 1988. This was a decisive step during a time when Sri Lanka was experiencing a period of severe instability, with riots and youth unrest all across the country.

After graduation, Jayasekara enrolled at the Colombo Law College and was sworn in as an Attorney-at-Law in 1997. Furthermore, he also completed a number of programmes in Government Financial Management in Australia and Conflict Resolution in Switzerland.

== Political career ==
In 1997, Jayasekara entered mainstream of politics by contesting in the local government elections under the Sri Lanka Freedom Party, where he received the highest number of preferential votes and entered the Paduwasnuwera Local Authority as a Local Government Member. In 1998, he was appointed as the General Secretary of the SLFP Youth Wing where he initiated the ‘Sarasamu Lanka’ programme to attract more young individuals to join the party. In addition to the above, Jayasekara was a Coordinating Secretary to the Ministry of Justice and International Trade from 1994 to 2000 for Prof. G. L. Peiris. In 2000 he was also appointed as the Chairman of the Mineral Sands Corporation and from 2001 to 2004 as the Chairman of Lanka Phosphate, whilst he was the Private Secretary to Prof. G. L. Peiris then Minister of Investment Promotion of Sri Lanka.

Jayasekara commenced his political journey as a member of the Sri Lanka Freedom Party. In 2001 he defected to the United National Party (UNP) and was a candidate in the general elections held the same year. In 2004, he was appointed as the organiser for the Katugampola electorate and received 52,457 preferential votes at the general elections. In 2005, he was appointed as the organiser for Paduvasnuwara and continued to work with the residents of his electorate to uplift their living standards. In the 2010 general elections, he received 132,600 preferential votes, the highest number of votes received by any candidate in the Kurunegala District.

=== Rift with Ranil Wickremesinghe and return to the SLFP ===
During his time in the UNP, Jayasekara was a vocal critic of UNP leader Ranil Wickremesinghe and the ways he ran his party. Jayasekara branded Wickremesinghe as a "dictator" in 2010. Along with fellow party reformist Sajith Premadasa, Jayasekara was one of the key members of the United National Party who fought for a change in the party leadership.

In 2012, it was widely speculated in the media that Jayasekara was on the edge of defecting from the UNP and join the UPFA government. He was quick to reject these allegations as baseless, and accused Wickremesinghe of pressuring him to leave the party. As a result of his continuous criticism of the party leadership, Jayasekara was informed to be present before the party disciplinary committee.

On 24 July 2013, he resigned from the UNP and rejoined the SLFP-led United People's Freedom Alliance (UPFA) to contest in the provincial council elections. He broke the record of former president Chandrika Kumaratunge for most votes in a provincial council election in Sri Lanka, and was elected as the Chief Minister of the North Western Province on 21 September 2013.

== Singing career ==
Jayasekara's elder brother Kithsiri Jayasekara is a well known senior artist in the Sri Lankan music industry. Dayasiri on the other hand was more concerned towards his political career than his singing career. He rose to prominence in reality TV show Mega Star, telecasted on Swarnavahini in 2010. He won the runner-up award in the competition, and was highly praised by the judges and fans. His first single, Sansare was released in 2012, with music produced by Sachith Peiris.
