= Lincoln Perera =

Sri Lankan civil servant

- Born: Mallawa Arachchige Lincoln Perera; ~1930; Kurunegala, Ceylon
- Died: 10 August 2010
- Other name: M. A. L. Perera
- Education: Nalanda College Colombo
- Occupations: Civil Servant, Tea Planter
- Employer: Ministry of Plantation Industries
- Known for: Secretary of the Ministry of Plantation Industries
- Spouse: Matilda
- Children: Ajith, Lal, Hiranthi, Ranjala
- Relatives: Gamini Jayawickrama Perera (brother)

Mallawa Arachchige Lincoln Perera (commonly known as Lincoln Perera) (Sinhala:ලින්කන් පෙරේරා) was a former civil servant in Sri Lanka. He was the Chairman of Janatha Estates Development Board and Secretary of the Ministry of Plantation Industries.

== Early life and education ==
Lincoln Perera was educated at Nalanda College, Colombo. While at school he played cricket and was the captain of first XI Nalanda cricket team in 1949. He is also the brother of Cabinet Minister (Minister of Food Protection) Gamini Jayawickrama Perera.

== Career ==
Lincoln was also a leading planter in Sri Lanka and he was the first Ceylonese to be appointed to Kandapola Estate, one of the biggest tea plantations in Sri Lanka. He was also a member of the Umpires Committee of Board of Control for Cricket in Sri Lanka (BCCSL).

== See also ==
- List of government owned companies in Sri Lanka
