= Janaka Wakkumbura =

Sri Lankan politician (born 1967)

Hon. Janaka Wakkumbura
- ජානක වක්කුඹුර ஜனக வக்கும்புர

Minister of Agriculture and Irrigation
- In office 18 April 2022 – 9 May 2022
- President: Gotabaya Rajapaksa
- Prime Minister: Mahinda Rajapaksa
- Preceded by: Mahindananda Aluthgamage (Note: As Minister of Agriculture); Chamal Rajapaksa (Note: As Minister of Irrigation)
- Succeeded by: Mahinda Amaraweera (Note: As Minister of Agriculture, Wildlife, and Forest Resources Conservation); Roshan Ranasinghe (Note: As Minister of Irrigation)

Member of Parliament for Ratnapura District
- In office 22 April 2010 – 24 September 2024

Personal details
- Born: December 15, 1967 (age 58)
- Party: Sri Lanka Podujana Peramuna
- Other political affiliations: Sri Lanka People's Freedom Alliance
- Children: 2

Janaka Wakkumbura (born 15 December 1967) is a Sri Lankan politician and Kalawana SLPP organiser. He served as a member of the Parliament of Sri Lanka from 2010 to 2024. Following the mass resignation of the Sri Lankan cabinet in the wake of the 2022 Sri Lankan protests, he was appointed as the Minister of Agriculture and Irrigation by President Gotabaya Rajapaksa on 18 April 2022. He served until 9 May 2022 until another mass resignation of the Sri Lankan cabinet.
