= Gamini Vijith Vijithamuni Soysa =

Sri Lankan politician

Hon. Vijith Vijithamuni Soysa MP

Minister of Fisheries, Aquatic Resources Development and Rural Economic Affairs
- In office 1 May 2018 – 15 December 2018
- President: Maithripala Sirisena
- Prime Minister: Ranil Wickremesinghe; Mahinda Rajapaksa
- Preceded by: Mahinda Amaraweera
- Succeeded by: P. Harrison (Note: As Minister of Agriculture, Rural Economic Affairs, Livestock Development, Irrigation, Fisheries and Aquatic Resources Development)

Minister of Irrigation and Water Resources Management (Note: Minister of Irrigation from 22 March 2015 to 17 August 2015)
- In office 22 March 2015 – 1 May 2018
- President: Maithripala Sirisena
- Prime Minister: Ranil Wickremesinghe
- Preceded by: Duminda Dissanayake
- Succeeded by: Chamal Rajapaksa

Minister of Wildlife
- In office 28 January 2013 – 12 January 2015
- President: Maithripala Sirisena
- Prime Minister: Ranil Wickremesinghe
- Preceded by: S. M. Chandrasena (Note: As Minister of Agrarian Services and Wildlife)
- Succeeded by: Gamini Jayawickrama Perera

Member of Parliament for National List
- In office 1 September 2015 – 3 March 2020

Member of Parliament for Monaragala District
- In office 22 April 2010 – 26 June 2015
- In office 18 October 2000 – 7 February 2004
- In office 9 March 1989 – 24 June 1994

5th Chief Minister of Uva Province
- In office 22 July 2004 – 20 August 2009
- Preceded by: Aththintha Marakalage Buddhadasa
- Succeeded by: Shasheendra Rajapaksa

Personal details
- Party: Samagi Jana Balawegaya
- Other political affiliations: Sri Lanka Freedom Party United People's Freedom Alliance

Gamini Vijith Vijithamuni Soysa is a Sri Lankan politician. He was the Chief Minister of Uva Province in Sri Lanka from July 2004 to Aug 2009. He was elected to the Sri Lankan Parliament in 1989, 2000, 2001 and 2010 from Monaragala.
