= Wiswa Warnapala =

Sri Lankan politician (1936–2016)

General Secretary of the United People's Freedom Alliance
- In office 14 August 2015 – 27 February 2016
- Leader: Maithripala Sirisena
- Preceded by: Susil Premajayanth
- Succeeded by: Mahinda Amaraweera

Minister of Higher Education
- In office 2007–2010

Member of Parliament for National List
- In office 2004–2010

Personal details
- Born: Watareke Arachchilage Wiswa Warnapala; 26 December 1936
- Died: 27 February 2016 (aged 79) Colombo, Sri Lanka
- Party: Sri Lanka Freedom Party
- Other political affiliations: United People's Freedom Alliance
- Spouse: Rani
- Children: Yajni, Kanchanakesi
- Education: University of Peradeniya, Kegalu Vidyalaya

Watareke Arachchilage Wiswa Warnapala (26 December 1936 – 27 February 2016) was a Sri Lankan academic, political scientist, and politician. He played a central role in developing political science as a discipline in Sri Lanka and later served as a National List Member of Parliament, holding key ministerial portfolios throughout his career. He received his early education in Economics and Political Science at the University of Ceylon, graduating with Honors in 1964. In 1967, he obtained a master's degree in Public Administration from the University of Pittsburgh in the United States as a Fulbright Scholar and later earned his Ph.D. from the University of Leeds in the United Kingdom in 1970.

Following his doctoral studies, he entered diplomatic service and served as counsellor at the Embassy of Sri Lanka in Moscow from 1974 to 1977. He subsequently pursued an academic career, holding the chair of Political Science at the University of Peradeniya, where he served as professor of Political Science prior to entering parliament. Alongside his permanent academic post, he held several international visiting appointments, including visiting professor at the University of Tasmania, Australia (1983–1984), the University of Connecticut, USA (1990), and the University of Ghent, Belgium (1992–1993).

Warnapala entered Parliament in 1994 and served as Deputy Minister of Education and Higher Education in the People’s Alliance Government from 1994 to 2000. During the same period, he also served as Chairman of the Committee on Public Accounts (COPA) and was a member of the Committee on Public Enterprises, playing a key role in parliamentary oversight. In 2001, he was appointed Chairman of the Employees' Trust Fund Board.

In 2004, he was reappointed to Parliament as a National List Member and was appointed Deputy Minister of Foreign Affairs. The following year, in 2005, he assumed office as Cabinet Minister of Parliamentary Affairs. From 2006 to 2009, he served as Minister of Higher Education in the United People’s Freedom Alliance led government, overseeing significant policy initiatives in the higher education sector.

He continued to play an influential role in national politics and party leadership, serving as General Secretary of the United People’s Freedom Alliance from 2015 to 2016. In addition, he served as a member of the Electoral Reforms Committee and the High Posts Committee in Parliament, and functioned as the Sri Lanka Freedom Party (SLFP) representative to the All Party Representative Committee (APRC) tasked with finding a political solution to Sri Lanka’s ethnic conflict.

Alongside his political career, Warnapala maintained a strong scholarly presence. He authored over twenty books in both English and Sinhala and contributed more than one hundred articles to academic journals. He remained widely recognised as a leading scholar in political science in Sri Lanka.

== Early life and education ==
Warnapala was born in the village of Kegalle in Sri Lanka on the 26th of December, 1936. He was born the middle son of five brothers, and became the sole son to enter a university. Warnapala completed a B.A. (Hons) in Economics at the University of Ceylon, Peradeniya in 1964. He subsequently earned an M.A. from the University of Pittsburgh in 1967 and a Ph.D. from University of Leeds in 1970. His studies focused on political science, public administration, and comparative governance. His difficult but remarkable journey stands as an enduring testament of the possibility of an individual to rise beyond humble beginnings through independent merit and effort.

== Academic career ==
After completing his doctoral studies, Warnapala joined the University of Peradeniya as a faculty member. He later became Professor of Political Science and Head of the Department of Political Science. He was instrumental in establishing political science as a structured academic discipline in Sri Lanka, mentoring students, developing curricula, and publishing extensively on governance, parliamentary practice, and higher-education policy. He was particularly respected for his expertise in the Westminster parliamentary model, constitutional governance, and comparative political institutions.

== Political career ==
Warnapala transitioned into politics later in life, serving as a National List Member of Parliament from 2004 to 2010. He held key ministerial roles including Minister of Higher Education (2007–2010) and Deputy Minister of Foreign Affairs, representing Sri Lanka in the Soviet Union and the United Nations. In 2015, he was appointed General Secretary of the United People’s Freedom Alliance (UPFA), a position he held until his death.

== Personal life ==
Warnapala met his wife Rani at the University of Peradeniya. Over the course of their lives, they had two daughters, Yajni and Kanchanakesi, and had three grandchildren, Madhri, Rahul, and Radith. In the present day, Yajni is a professor of Applied Mathematics and Kachanakesi is a senior lecturer of English Literature.

== Selected publications ==
- A Life Lived - An Unfinished Memoir (2016). Godage International Publishers, Colombo
- Sri Lanka Freedom Party (2013). Godage International Publishers, Colombo.
- Parliament in Sri Lanka: A Study of the Working of Parliamentary Institutions in Sri Lanka (2013). S. Godage & Brothers, Colombo.
- Aspects of Politics and Higher Education in Sri Lanka: A Collection of Essays (2011). Godage International Publishers, Colombo.
- Struggle for Socialism: The Role of the Communist Party in Sri Lanka (2011). Godage International Publishers, Colombo.
- Higher Education Policy in Sri Lanka: New Perspectives and Change (2009). Vijitha Yapa Publications, Colombo.
- Sri Lanka Soviet Relations: A Study in Retrospect (2007). Godage International Publishers, Colombo.
- Parliament and Public Accountability in Sri Lanka (2004). Godage International Publishers.
- Politics in Sri Lanka: A Collection of Essays on Personalities and Issues (2001). S. Godage & Brothers, Colombo.
- Provincial Politics in Sri Lanka: An Analysis of the Southern Provincial Council Election, 1994 (1997). Navrang.
- Ethnic Strife and Politics in Sri Lanka: An Investigation into Demands and Responses (1994). Navrang.
- Local Politics in Sri Lanka: An Analysis of the Local Government Election of May 1991 (1993). South Asian Publishers Pvt. Limited in collaboration with Windsor Marketing (Pvt.) Limited.
- The Sri Lankan Political Scene (1993). Navrang.
- Recent Politics in Sri Lanka: The Presidential Election and the Referendum of 1982: A Study of Electoral Practice and Behaviour in an Asian Democracy (1983). Navrang.
- Civil Service Administration in Ceylon: A Study in Bureaucratic Adaptation (1974). Department of Cultural Affairs.
