= Athula Wijesinghe =

Sri Lankan politician

Hon. Athula Wijesinghe

Chief Minister of North Western Province
- In office 2002 – 3 October 2013
- Preceded by: S. B. Nawinne
- Succeeded by: Dayasiri Jayasekara

Personal details
- Born: Kurunegala, Sri Lanka
- Party: United People's Freedom Alliance
- Education: Maliyadeva College, Kurunegala and Nalanda College Colombo
- Occupation: Politics
- Profession: Lawyer

Athula Wijesinghe was the Chief Minister of the North Western Province of Sri Lanka between 2002 and 2013.

He is a lawyer by profession and was educated at Maliyadeva College, Kurunegala and Nalanda College Colombo.
