= Government Medical Officers Association =

Trade union in Sri Lanka

GMOA
- Government Medical Officers Association
- Founded: 1926
- Location: Sri Lanka
- Website: www.gmoa.lk

The Government Medical Officers Association (GMOA) is a trade union in Sri Lanka. Founded in 1926 as the Government Medical Officers' Association (Central Province) in Kandy, it was renamed as Government Medical Officers' Association of Ceylon in 1927 and in 1949 registered as a trade union under the leadership of Dr E. M. Wijerama.

== History ==
=== Under Padeniya ===
During the leadership of Anuruddha Padeniya, the GMOA was heavily politicized, becoming affiliated with the Sri Lanka Podujana Peramuna and the Rajapaksa family. The GMOA frequently clashed with the 2015-2019 government, including organizing strikes over various issues, demanding special admission criteria for children of its members to elite government schools bypassing the national government admission process, and calling for duty-free vehicle permits. However in May 2017 GMOA head Anuruddha Padeniya was caught by the media granting appointments at six private hospitals during the time of a strike by the GMOA and other trade unions and MP Ranjan Ramanayake also got an appointment with him on a time during the strike and showed the receipt in social media and in a media conference. Dr.Padeniya quickly reacted by cancelling the appointments. OPD services and medical clinics of several government hospitals were crippled due to the strike but was ultimately considered a failure as many hospitals continued normal work and over 200 Trade Unions opposed the GMOA strike and accused them of attempting to return Mahinda Rajapaksa back to power. Rajapaksa personally visited Padeniya after handing over nominations in 2015 general election and Padeniya appreciated Rajapaksa for contesting. Some of the strikes were even carried out during epidemics such as influenza and dengue in the country on several occasions.

GMOA also demanded special concessions from the Inland Revenue (IR) Act and in 2018 threatened trade union action inform of an island wide strike if there demands are not met. Following strike action and discussions with officials of the Finance Ministry, Health Ministry and the GMOA, contradicting statements were released by the Health Minister stating that income tax imposed on specialist doctors will be reduced to 15% from the normal 24%; while the Finance Minister has refuted the Health Ministers statement stating that the income tax rate for 24% based on the Inland Revenue (IR) Act was not changed but provisional relief granted by changing the method of calculating tax imposed on specialist doctors. According to the Department of Inland Revenue, only 6,000 out of the 39,000 registered doctors pay income tax.

With the Rajapaksa's return to power in 2019 the GMOA and Padeniya were major endorsers of the transition to organic agriculture ignoring scientific evidence and pushing mythical claims of ancient Sri Lankans having lifespans of 140 years blaming the decline to modern agricultural technology as well as spreading claims of Sri Lankans being the largest consumer of what he described as "poison". However experts including Rohan Pethiyagoda had criticized the claims noting the claims by GMOA were not backed by data and had no basis in fact or science. Data showed that Sri Lanka was in fact using the lowest amounts of fertiliser and pesticides per unit area in the region with in addition to a reduction in the use of Class 1 pesticide by 98% and Class 2 by 29% between 2002 and 2016. As a result GMOA was accused of engaging in Lysenkoism with Padeniya being called the "local Lysenko". However with the beginning of the agricultural crisis and the worsening of the Sri Lankan economic crisis the GMOA began to distance itself from the policies even claiming Padeniya being a member of the committee that oversaw the transition to organic agriculture was irrelevant.

== See also ==
- Sri Lanka Medical Council (SLMC)
