= Sirinal de Mel =

Sri Lankan politician (1941–2024)

Hon. Sirinal de Mel

Member of Parliament for National List
- In office 2015–2020

Personal details
- Born: 23 June 1941
- Died: 13 June 2024 (aged 82) Piliyandala, Sri Lanka
- Party: United National Party
- Other political affiliations: Samagi Jana Balawegaya
- Children: 1

Srinal de Mel (23 June 1941 – 13 June 2024) was a Sri Lankan politician and a Member of Parliament belonging to the United National Party.

In 1981 he was appointed as the general secretary and chief executive officer of the Samagi Jana Balawegaya. He was appointed to Parliament as a national list member in 2015.

De Mel died on 13 June 2024, at the age of 82.
