= P. Harrison =

Sri Lankan politician

Hon. Pelisge Harrison MP
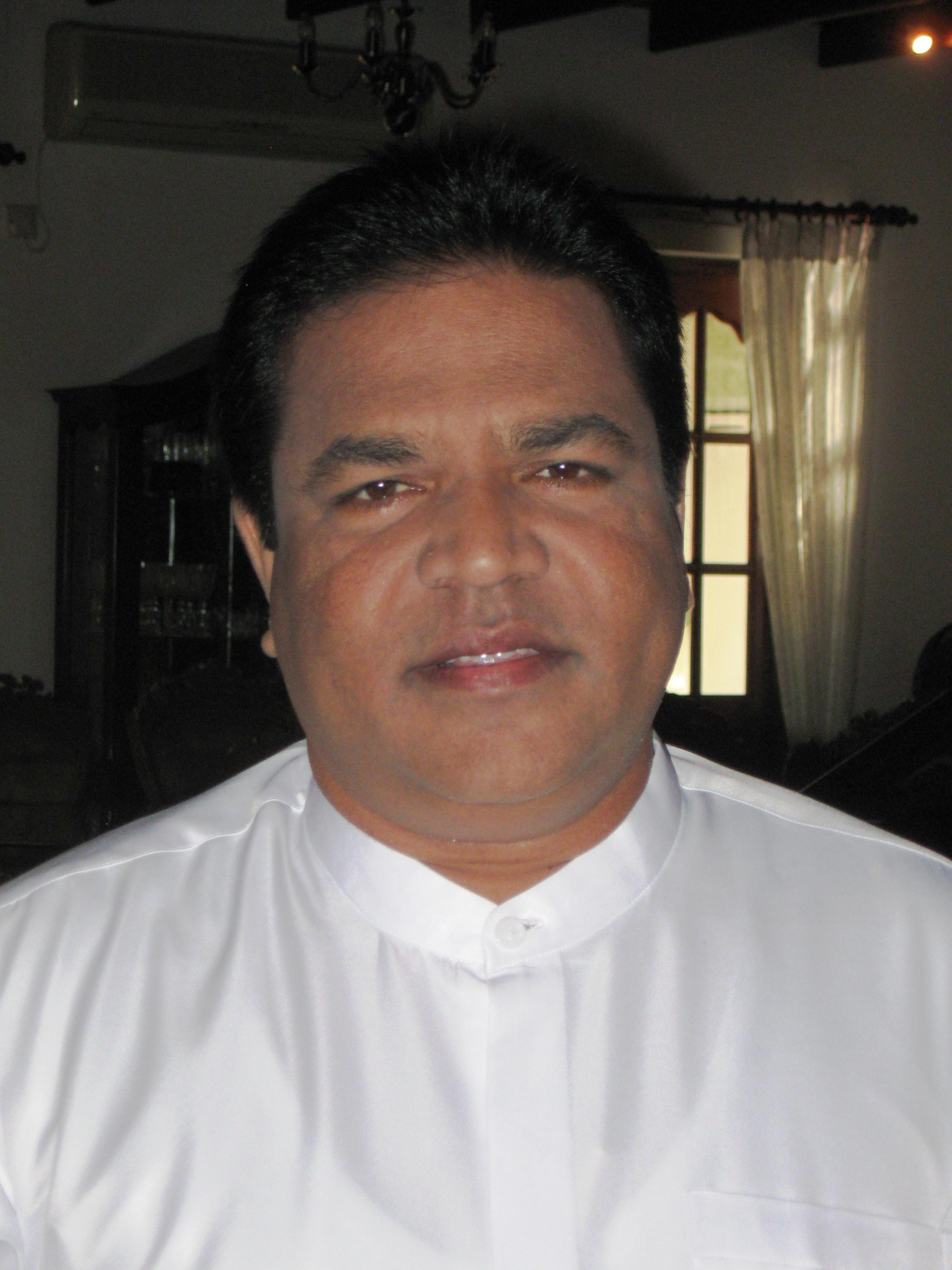

Minister of Agriculture, Rural Economic Affairs, Livestock Development, Irrigation, Fisheries and Aquatic Resources Development
- Incumbent
- Assumed office 20 December 2018
- President: Maithripala Sirisena
- Prime Minister: Ranil Wickremesinghe
- Preceded by: Mahinda Amaraweera

Minister of Social Empowerment
- In office 1 May 2018 – 26 October 2018
- President: Maithripala Sirisena
- Prime Minister: Ranil Wickremesinghe
- Preceded by: S. B. Dissanayake

Minister of Rural Economic Affairs
- In office 4 September 2015 – 1 May 2018
- President: Maithripala Sirisena
- Prime Minister: Ranil Wickremesinghe
- Succeeded by: Gamini Vijith Vijithamuni Soysa

Minister of Housing Development
- In office 2001–2004

Member of Parliament for Anuradhapura District
- Incumbent
- Assumed office 1994

Personal details
- Born: July 24, 1964 (age 61) Anuradhapura, North Central Province, Sri Lanka
- Party: United National Party
- Other political affiliations: United National Front
- Occupation: Politician
- Profession: Agriculture

Pelisge Harrison (born July 24, 1964) is a Sri Lankan United National Party politician, current member of the Parliament for Anuradhapura District current cabinet Minister of Social Empowerment and former Minister of Rural Economic Affairs. Harrison first entered parliament in 1994 from the United National Party within a few years from his graduation from the University of Kelaniya.

He is the Minister of Agriculture, Rural Economic Affairs, Livestock Development, Irrigation, Fisheries and Aquatic Resources Development.
