= Mahinda Amaraweera =

Sri Lankan politician (born 1962)

Hon. Mahinda Amaraweera
- මහින්ද අමරවීර மகிந்த அமரவீர

Minister of Agriculture
- In office 12 May 2022 – 23 September 2024
- President: Gotabaya Rajapaksa; Ranil Wickremesinghe
- Prime Minister: Ranil Wickremesinghe; Dinesh Gunawardena
- Preceded by: Janaka Wakkumbura
- Succeeded by: Anura Kumara Dissanayake
- In office 4 September 2015 – 26 October 2018
- President: Maithripala Sirisena
- Prime Minister: Ranil Wickremesinghe
- Preceded by: Duminda Dissanayake
- Succeeded by: P. Harrison

Minister of Wildlife and Forest Conservation
- In office 12 May 2022 – 19 January 2023
- President: Gotabaya Rajapaksa; Ranil Wickremesinghe
- Prime Minister: Ranil Wickremesinghe; Dinesh Gunawardena
- Preceded by: Wimalaweera Dissanayake
- Succeeded by: Pavithra Wanniarachchi

Minister of Environment
- In office 12 August 2020 – 3 April 2022
- President: Gotabaya Rajapaksa
- Prime Minister: Mahinda Rajapaksa
- Preceded by: S. M. Chandrasena
- Succeeded by: Naseer Ahamed

Minister of Power and Energy
- In office 22 November 2019 – 12 August 2020
- President: Gotabaya Rajapaksa
- Prime Minister: Mahinda Rajapaksa
- Preceded by: Ravi Karunanayake
- Succeeded by: Udaya Gammanpila (Note: As Minister of Power); Dullas Alahapperuma (Note: As Minister of Energy)

Minister of Transport Service Management (Note: Minister of Passenger Transport Management from 22 November 2019 to 4 December 2019.)
- In office 22 November 2019 – 12 August 2020
- President: Gotabaya Rajapaksa
- Prime Minister: Mahinda Rajapaksa
- Preceded by: Arjuna Ranatunga
- Succeeded by: Dilum Amunugama

Chief Opposition Whip
- In office 18 December 2018 – 22 November 2019
- President: Maithripala Sirisena
- Prime Minister: Ranil Wickremesinghe
- Preceded by: Anura Kumara Dissanayake

Minister of Disaster Management
- In office 2010 – 12 January 2015
- President: Mahinda Rajapaksa
- Prime Minister: D. M. Jayaratne

Deputy Minister of Health
- In office 2010–2010
- President: Mahinda Rajapaksa
- Prime Minister: D. M. Jayaratne

Minister of Water Supply
- In office 2007–2010
- President: Mahinda Rajapaksa
- Prime Minister: Ratnasiri Wickremanayake

General Secretary of the United People's Freedom Alliance
- In office 8 March 2016 – 9 December 2019
- Leader: Maithripala Sirisena
- Preceded by: Wiswa Warnapala
- Succeeded by: Alliance Dissolved

Member of Parliament for Hambantota District
- In office 2004–2024

Member of Parliament for National List
- In office 2001–2004

Personal details
- Born: 12 February 1962 (age 64) Udayala, Angunakolapelessa, Southern Province, Sri Lanka
- Party: Sri Lanka Podujana Peramuna (After 2018)
- Other political affiliations: Sri Lanka Freedom Party (before 2018); Sri Lanka People's Freedom Alliance (2020 - Present)
- Spouse(s): Dilrukshika Weerakoon (m.1996-2011), Madushini Prancisku (m.2018-),
- Children: Pasan Amaraweera
- Education: Vijitha Central College, Dickwella.
- Occupation: Politician

Mahinda Amaraweera (Sinhala:මහින්ද අමරවීර,Tamil: மஹிந்த அமரவீர; born 12 February 1962) is a Sri Lankan politician. He was the cabinet Minister of Agriculture. He is also a member of the Parliament of Sri Lanka. for the Hambantota District, as a member of the Sri Lanka People's Freedom Alliance.

== Birth and education ==
He was born in a remote village called Udayala in Angunukolapelessa. He received his primary education at Angunukolapalessa primary school and secondary education at Vijitha Central College, Dickwella.

== Politics ==
On 22 May 2017, Amaraweera was appointed Mahaweli Development State Minister.

On 8 March 2016 he was appointed General Secretary of the United People's Freedom Alliance, which was vacated following the death of Wiswa Warnapala.

== Family ==
He was married to 'Dilrukshika Weerakoon' from Kandy till 2011. In November 2018 he married 'Madushini Prancisku' daughter of Mr and Mrs Prancisku from Weeraketiya. Mr Amaraweera has only one son from his first marriage Pasan Amaraweera who has studied in Royal College Colombo and is currently doing his higher studies in London.
