= Batty Weerakoon =

Sri Lankan Trotskyist (1932–2019)

Batty Weerakoon (20 January 1932 – 7 October 2019) was a Sri Lankan Trotskyist. He was the former Minister of Science and Technology, Minister of Justice and Ethnic Affairs, and General Secretary of the Lanka Sama Samaja Party (LSSP).

Born in Matale, Weerakoon was educated at Trinity College, Kandy and at the University of Ceylon where he read English. During his university he was the President of the Student’s Council in 1955. He served as private secretary to Dr N. M. Perera. He later qualified as an Advocate, having practiced under Colvin R. de Silva.
