= Ministry of Wildlife and Forest Resources Conservation =

Government ministry of Sri Lanka

- වනජීවී හා වන සම්සත් සංරක්ෂණ අමාත්‍යාංශය வனசீவராசிகள் மற்றும் வனப்பாதுகாப்பு அமைச்சு

Agency overview
- Formed: 6 February 2013; 13 years ago
- Jurisdiction: Government of Sri Lanka
- Employees: 1,292
- Annual budget: Rs 1.536,000 Billion
- Minister responsible: Hon. Mahinda Amaraweera, Minister of Wildlife and Forest Resources Conservation
- Agency executive: B. K. U. A. Wickramasinghe, Secretary
- Website: wrcmin.gov.lk

The Ministry of Wildlife and Forest Resources Conservation (Sinhala: වනජීවී හා වන සම්සත් සංරක්ෂණ අමාත්‍යාංශය; Tamil: வனசீவராசிகள் மற்றும் வனப்பாதுகாப்பு அமைச்சு) is a ministry in the Government of Sri Lanka responsible "to pave the way for human beings and all animal species to live in harmony through the establishment of an effective Wildlife Reservation Network". It was created on 6 February 2013.

== List of ministers ==
Minister of Wildlife and Forest Resources Conservation of Sri Lanka
- Incumbent; Hon. Mahinda Amaraweera since 23 May 2022
- Ministry of Wildlife Resources Conservation
- Formation: 6 February 2013
- Website: wrcmin.gov.lk

The Minister of Wildlife and Forest Resources Conservation is an appointment in the Cabinet of Sri Lanka.

Parties

Sri Lanka Freedom Party United National Party

Name	Portrait	Party	Tenure	President
Gamini Vijith Vijithamuni Soysa		Sri Lanka Freedom Party	28 January 2013 – 9 January 2015	Mahinda Rajapaksa

== See also ==
- List of ministries of Sri Lanka
