= Mohamed Mahroof =

Sri Lankan politician (1950–2012)

Project Minister of Urban Public Utilities
- In office 2001–2004

Member of Parliament for Colombo District
- In office 2000–2010

Personal details
- Party: United National Party (-2011); Sri Lanka Freedom Party (2011-)
- Other political affiliations: United National Front (-2011); United People's Freedom Alliance (2011-)

Mohamed Mahroof (c. 1950 – 3 December 2012) was a Sri Lankan politician, a member of the Parliament of Sri Lanka and a government minister. He was a member of the Colombo Municipal Council.
