= Leslie Gunawardana =

Sri Lankan academic and politician (1938–2010)

Honourable Leslie Gunawardana MP

Minister of Science and Technology
- In office October 2000 – September 2001

Member of Parliament for National List
- In office 2000–2001

Personal details
- Born: 17 August 1938 Tholangamuwa, Ceylon
- Died: 16 November 2010 (aged 72)
- Party: Communist Party of Sri Lanka
- Other political affiliations: People's Alliance
- Education: University of Ceylon, Peradeniya; School of Oriental and African Studies
- Profession: Academic

Ranaweera Appuhamilage Leslie Herbert Gunawardana (17 August 1938 – 16 November 2010) was a Sri Lankan historian, academic, politician and government minister.

== Early life and family ==
Gunawardana was born on 17 August 1938 in Tholangamuwa, Ceylon. Both of his parents died when he was young and he was brought up his uncle. He was educated at Tholangamuwa Central College. Having won the 1956 the University Entrance Arts Scholarship, he joined the University of Ceylon, Peradeniya, graduating in 1960 with a first class B.A. honours degree in ancient history. He received a PhD degree from the School of Oriental and African Studies in 1965 for his research, guided by Arthur Llewellyn Basham and Johannes Gijsbertus de Casparis, on Buddhist monastic institutions in Ceylon during the early medieval period. His thesis was published by the University of Arizona Press in 1979 under the title Robe and Plough: Monasticism and Economic Interest in Early Medieval Sri Lanka.

Gunawardana was married to Viru. They had a son - Asela.

== Career ==
Gunawardana joined the faculty of the University of Ceylon, Peradeniya in 1960 as an assistant lecturer in the Department of History. Rising up the academic ladder, he was appointed Personal Chair in History in 1982 and dean of the Faculty of Arts in 1991 before serving as vice-chancellor (1997-00) of the University of Peradeniya. He also served as chairman of the Association of Commonwealth Universities.

Gunawardana was a long-standing member of the Communist Party of Sri Lanka, having joined in 1960. He was appointed as one of the People's Alliance's National List MP in the Sri Lankan Parliament following the 2000 parliamentary election. He was appointed Minister of Science and Technology after the election. He lost his ministerial position in September 2001 following a cabinet reshuffle.

Gunawardana died on 16 November 2010 following a prolonged illness.
