= S. Ganeshamoorthy =

Sri Lankan politician

S. Ganeshamoorthy of Sri Lanka was a former MP & Deputy Minister of Ethnic affairs, National Integration & Mineral Resources. He is a strong Tamil person in the east. He contested in the 2000 General election and was able to secure a seat in Batticaloa District. The majority of the district development occurred during his political period.
