= T. B. Ekanayake =

Sri Lankan politician (1954–2020)

Hon. T. B. Ekanayake MP
- තිලකරත්න ඒකනායක திலகரத்ன ஏக்கநாயக்க
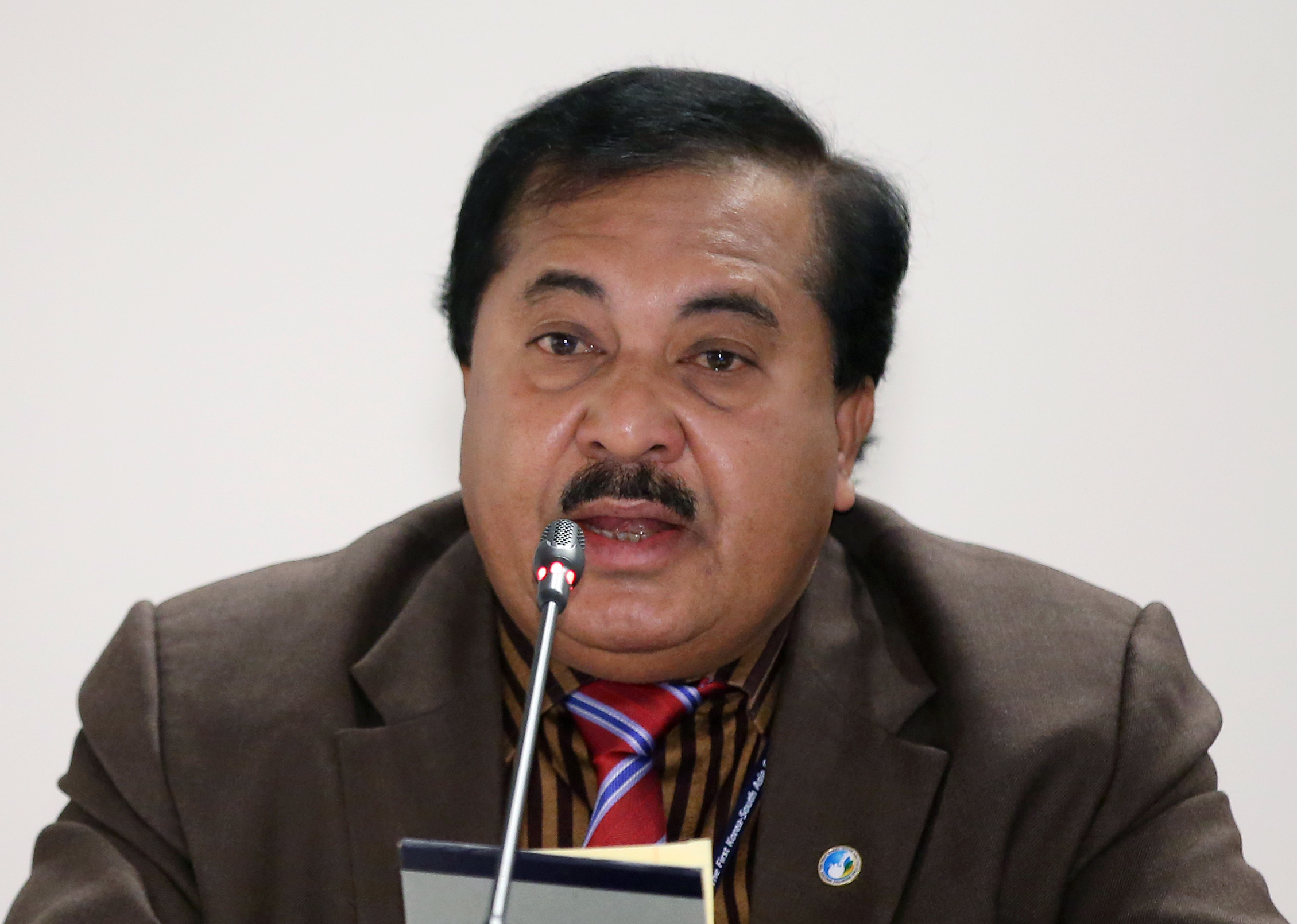

Deputy Minister of Cultural Affairs
- In office 2000–2001

Deputy Minister of Highways
- In office 2004–2007

Non-Cabinet Minister of Highways
- In office 2007–2010

Deputy Minister of Education
- In office 2010 – 12 January 2015

Member of Parliament for Kurunegala District
- In office 2001–2020
- In office 1994–2000

Personal details
- Born: August 28, 1954 Colombo
- Died: December 6, 2020 (aged 66) Kurunegala
- Party: Sri Lanka Freedom Party
- Other political affiliations: United People's Freedom Alliance

Thilakarathne Bandara Ekanayake (ටී. බී. ඒකනායක; 28 August 1954 – 6 December 2020) was a Sri Lankan politician, a member of the Parliament of Sri Lanka and a government minister.
