= S. B. Nawinne =

Sri Lankan politician (born 1946)

Hon. S. B. Nawinne MP

Minister of Internal Affairs, Cultural Affairs and Wayamba Development
- Incumbent
- Assumed office 4 September 2015
- President: Maithripala Sirisena
- Prime Minister: Ranil Wickremesinghe

Chief Minister of North Western Province
- In office 28 January 1999 – 2002
- Preceded by: Nimal Bandara
- Succeeded by: Athula Wijesinghe

Minister of Regional Infrastructure Development

Minister of Rural Industries & Self-Employment Promotion

Minister of National Languages & Social Integration
- In office 2010–2015

Member of Parliament for Kurunegala District
- Incumbent
- Assumed office 2001
- In office 1989–1999

Personal details
- Born: 24 February 1946 (age 80)
- Party: United National Party (2015-present); Sri Lanka Freedom Party (1989–2015)
- Other political affiliations: United People's Freedom Alliance (2004–2015)
- Website: sbnawinne.lk

R. M. Seneviratne Bandara Nawinne (born 24 February 1946) is a member of United National Party and a member of the Parliament of Sri Lanka. He was long time member of Sri Lanka Freedom Party but cross to the United National Party in 2015 General elections. He was appointed as a cabinet minister under the National Government led by Prime Minister Ranil Wickramasinghe.

Nawinne held key ministerial positions of the United People's Freedom Alliance and Peoples Alliance governments from 1994. Later in 2000 he was appointed as the Chief Minister of North Western Province
