= Rajapaksa =

- Language: Sinhala

Other names
- Variant forms: Rajapakse; Rajapaksha; Rajapakshe

Rajapaksa or Rajapakse is a Sinhalese surname. Notable people with the surname include:

- Rajapaksa family, Sri Lankan political dynasty
  - Ajith Rajapakse (born 1974), Sri Lankan politician
  - Basil Rajapaksa, (born 1951), Sri Lankan politician
  - Chamal Rajapaksa (born 1942), Sri Lankan politician
  - D. A. Rajapaksa (1905–1967), Ceylonese politician
  - D. M. Rajapaksa, (1897–1945), Ceylonese politician
  - George Rajapaksa (1926–76), Ceylonese politician
  - Gotabhaya Rajapaksa (born 1949), Sri Lankan President
  - Gunathilaka Rajapaksha (born 1957), Sri Lankan politician
  - Lakshman Rajapaksa (1905–1969), Ceylonese politician
  - Mahinda Rajapaksa (born 1945), Sri Lankan President and Prime Minister
  - Namal Rajapaksa (born 1986), Sri Lankan politician
  - Nirupama Rajapaksa (born 1962), Sri Lankan politician
  - Rohitha Rajapaksa (born 1989), Sri Lankan cricketer
  - Shasheendra Rajapaksa, Sri Lankan politician
  - Thilak Rajapaksha (born 1971), Sri Lankan politician
  - Wijeyadasa Rajapakshe (born 1959), Sri Lankan lawyer and politician
  - Yoshitha Rajapaksa (born 1988), Sri Lankan rugby union player
- Bhanuka Rajapaksa (born 1991), Sri Lankan cricketer
- Dayan Rajapakse (born 1972), Sri Lankan physician
- Lalitha Rajapakse (1900–1976), Ceylonese lawyer and politician
- Morris Rajapaksa (died 1995), Sri Lankan politician
- Nimal Rajapakshe, Canadian academic
- Somaratne Rajapakse, Sri Lankan soldier
- Suranimala Rajapaksha (1949–2016), Sri Lankan politician
