= Rajapaksa family =

Political family in Sri Lanka

- Political dynasty
- Country: Sri Lanka
- Current region: Hambantota
- Origin: Medamulana, Weeraketiya
- Founder: Don David Rajapaksa
- Current head: Mahinda Rajapaksa
- Members: D. M. Rajapaksa; D. A. Rajapaksa; George Rajapaksa; Lakshman Rajapaksa; Chamal Rajapaksa; Mahinda Rajapaksa; Gotabhaya Rajapaksa; Basil Rajapaksa; Nirupama Rajapaksa; Shasheendra Rajapaksa; Namal Rajapaksa; Nipuna Ranawaka
- Traditions: Sri Lanka Freedom Party; Sri Lanka Podujana Peramuna
- Estate: Medamulana Walawwa
- Properties: Carlton Sports Network

The Rajapaksa family (Sinhala: රාජපක්ෂ, romanized: Rājapakṣa) is a Sri Lankan family that is prominent in politics. It was one of Sri Lanka's most powerful families during Mahinda Rajapaksa's presidency, when many members of the family occupied senior positions in the Sri Lankan state. They have been particularly prominent in Sri Lankan national politics since 2005 when Mahinda Rajapaksa was elected president.

As their political power grew, there were reports suggesting that the country was heading towards autocracy under their rule. Following the unexpected defeat of Mahinda Rajapaksa in the 2015 presidential election, they have been accused of authoritarianism, corruption, nepotism and bad governance. In the 2019 presidential election, Gotabaya Rajapaksa, the brother of Mahinda Rajapaksa, ran and won. The popularity of the Rajapaksa family collapsed after their actions caused the economic crisis that started in 2019, resulting in Sri Lanka defaulting on its debt for the first time in its post-independence history within just 30 months of coming to power. The extended Rajapaksa family is believed to have amassed a large amount of wealth and while the amount of and scale is unknown, several members of the family have been revealed in international investigations such as the Pandora Papers to be using networks of shell companies and trusts to hide their wealth in offshore tax havens, which has led to accusations of Rajapaksas turning Sri Lanka into a Kleptocracy.

== History ==
The Rajapaksas are a rural land-owning family from the village Giruwapattuwa in the southern district of Hambantota. The family owned paddy fields and coconut plantations. One of its members, Don David Rajapaksa, held the feudal post of Vidanarachchi in Ihala Valikada Korale. The family entered the political scene when Don David Rajapaksa's son Don Mathew Rajapaksa was elected in 1936 to represent Hambantota district in the State Council. Don Mathew died in 1945 and at the resulting by-election his brother Don Alwin Rajapaksa was elected without a contest. At the 1947 parliamentary election, two members of the family were elected to represent both of the constituencies in Hambantota district. Don Alwin Rajapaksa was elected MP for Beliatta and Lakshman Rajapaksa (Don Mathew's son) was elected MP for Hambantota. The Rajapaksas continued to dominate politics in Hambantota district for next three decades with two other members of the family, George Rajapaksa and Mahinda Rajapaksa, also entering parliament. The Rajapaksas were represented in the country's legislatures continuously from 1936 till 1977. This streak ended after the UNP landslide at the 1977 parliamentary election.

The family re-emerged as the dominant political force in Hambantota district when Mahinda and his brother Chamal Rajapaksa were elected in the 1989 parliamentary election to represent Hambantota Electoral District. They were later joined by Nirupama Rajapaksa, Basil Rajapaksa and Namal Rajapaksa.

Although the Rajapaksas had dominated politics in Hambantota District since 1936, national politics had been dominated by other families such as the Senanayake family and Bandaranaike family. This changed in 2005 when Mahinda Rajapaksa was elected president. Since then, members of the family have been appointed to senior political positions. Immediately after being elected president, Mahinda appointed his brother Gotabhaya Rajapaksa as Defence Secretary, the most senior civil service position in the Ministry of Defence. Another brother, Basil Rajapaksa, was appointed Senior Presidential Advisor. In 2010 Mahinda Rajapaksa was re-elected President contesting against a grand opposition coalition that included UNP, TNA, JVP. At the 2010 Parliamentary Elections, Chamal Rajapaksa, Basil Rajapaksa and Namal Rajapaksa were elected. Basil Rajapaksa received 425,100 preferential votes from the Gampaha District, the highest by any candidate at the 2010 General election while Namal Rajapaksa obtained 147,568 preferential votes from Hambantota District, the highest majority percentage-wise at the election. Subsequently, Chamal was elected as the Speaker of Parliament unanimously and Basil was appointed as the Minister of Economic Development. Between them the three Rajapaksa brothers are in charge of five government ministries: Defence & Urban Development, Law & Order, Economic Development, Finance & Planning and Ports & Highways. At one point the brothers reportedly directly controlled 70% of the national budget. The Rajapaksas denied having control over such amounts. According to the 2014 budget the brothers have been allocated 47% of the national budget (40% of recurrent budget and 57% of capital budget).

Numerous other members of the extended family have also been appointed to senior positions state institutions. The accumulation of so much power by one family has inevitably led to accusations of nepotism. The Rajapaksas deny the charges of nepotism even though evidence of large amounts of corruption, such as the censorship of journalists and the family's unwillingness to yield power to recent victorious Tamils in Northern Sri Lanka, exist everywhere the country.

After the defeat of Mahinda Rajapaksa's administration which resulted in the loss of their senior positions, some brothers of Mahinda Rajapaksa have fled from the country to avoid being arrested on charges of corruption and wrongdoing.

=== Political scandal ===
Following the 2015 presidential election defeat, the Rajapaksa family were accused of misusing public resources during the campaign, including use of the Sri Lankan Air Force in the campaign that cost $17,273.28 (Rs. 2,278,000.00) of public funds. The Rajapaksa family received numerous state resource abuse complaints from organisations and election monitors, including involvement in fraud, misuse of powers, and murder. Among the charges are money laundering said to have taken $5.31 billion (Rs. 700 billion) out of the country illegally through Sri Lanka's Central Bank using Mahinda Rajapaksa's close association with Ajith Nivard Cabraal, the former governor of Central Bank of Sri Lanka.

On 23 January 2015, the Seychelles government announced that would assist the Sri Lankan government in search of funds that were transferred by the Rajapaksa regime into Port Victoria offshore bank accounts. In February 2015, India pledged to help the Sirisena Government in tracing the billions of dollars that were taken out of the country illegally. Sirisena's government sought help from the World Bank and the International Monetary Fund in locating this hidden wealth to expose the alleged corruption of the previous regime. An Anti-Corruption Unit was formed by then Prime Minister Ranil Wickremesinghe, and the new Cabinet has appointed a high-powered "rapid response team" to look into corrupt land transactions, stock market price-fixing and the abuse of state funds for political purposes by Rajapaksa family and the close association of Mahinda Rajapaksa.

Public sentiment towards the ruling Rajapaksha-led government took a significant downturn during the foreign currency and economic crisis faced by Sri Lanka in 2022. Demonstrations against their rule were held in major residential areas of Colombo including one held near the president Gotabaya Rajapaksa's private resident. In the escalation of protests, an angry mob in Sri Lanka burned down several homes belonging to the Rajapaksa family. Previously, protesters were attacked by government supporters.

=== 2019 presidential election and economic crisis ===
In 2018, Gotabaya Rajapaksa, brother of Mahinda Rajapaksa emerged as a possible candidate for the 2019 Presidential election, which he successfully contested on a pro-nationalistic, economic development and national security platform, gaining a majority from the predominant Sinhalese areas of the island. He is the first person with military background to be elected as President of Sri Lanka and also the first person to be elected President who had not held an elected office prior.

After 2020 Sri Lankan parliamentary election, Mahinda Rajapaksa was appointed as the Prime Minister while Chamal Rajapaksa and Namal Rajapaksa became Minister of Irrigation and Minister of Youth and Sports respectively in the Second Gotabaya Rajapaksa cabinet. Later in July 2021 Basil Rajapaksa was appointed as the Minister of Finance after entering the parliament from the national list. When the country began to face the economic downfall, the public put the blame on the Rajapaksa family's corruption and economic mismanagement. Following the massive protests demanding the Rajapaksa family to resign, they resigned from their Ministerial portfolios. Mahinda Rajapakshe resigned on 9 May 2022, after instigating a violent attack on protesters at Galle Face Green, resulting in series of retaliatory attacks against Rajapakshe loyalists by the protesters. On 9 June, Basil Rajapakshe resigned from his parliamentary seat. Later in July 2022, President Gotabaya fled the country and stepped down, after the protesters stormed his official residence.

In November 2023, Supreme court ruled that former president Gotabaya Rajapaksa, ex-prime minister Mahinda Rajapaksa, former finance minister Basil Rajapaksa and other senior officials violated the fundamental rights of the people by mishandling the economy and causing the unprecedented economic crisis.

Namal Rajapakshe contested the 2024 Sri Lankan presidential election as the SLPP candidate, and became 4th with only 2.57% of the popular votes. In 2024, for the first time in 88 years, no member of Rajapaksa family contested from their ancestral seat of Hambanthota, with both Mahinda Rajapaksa and Chamal Rajapaksa stepping down from re-election and Namal Rajapaksa seeking entry through the National list.

== Wealth ==
Wealth of the Rajapaksa family has been a subject of speculation with many members believed to have amassed a large amount of hidden wealth some of which have been revealed in international investigations and claims of wealth reaching over billions of dollars have been made. The Rajapaksa family owned the Carlton Sports Network, the Carlton Pre-schools and the Carlton Motor Sports Club which have been accused of illegally using state resources

Namal Rajapaksa is the owner of Gowers Corporate Services, HelloCorp, and NR Consultants which have been accused of being used for money laundering and getting lucrative contracts from the state-owned SriLankan Airlines during the Rajapaksa administration.

Rohitha Rajapaksa who has never been employed and lacks any recorded sources of income was found to own a luxury hotel in the Sinharaja reserve called the "Green Eco Lodge". The hotel was initially believed to have been owned by Yoshitha Rajapaksa but an investigation confirmed that Rohitha was the owner. Environmental activists have accused the hotel of damaging the biodiversity by the construction of the hotel and have accused the Rajapaksa family of using the military in the construction of the hotel Rohitha accepted that he owned the hotel and denied any wrongdoing during its construction.

Nirupama Rajapaksa and her husband Thirukumar Nadesan was exposed by the Pandora Papers for using offshore shell companies to hide their wealth. The couple was revealed to own luxury apartments in Sydney and London, as well as a large number of expensive artworks. The ICIJ was able to confirm 18 million USD worth of offshore assets but the real amount of is believed to be significantly higher as leaked emails from Nadesan's advisor to Asiaciti Trust placed their overall wealth in 2011 at more than $160 million.

== Family tree ==
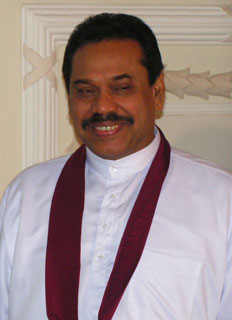
Mahinda Rajapaksa, President of Sri Lanka from 2005 to 2015

1. Don David Rajapaksa, Vidane Arachchi (colonial post) + Dona Gimara Moonesinghe

1.1 Don Charles Coronelis Rajapaksa
1.2 Dona Carolina (Carlina) Bandara Weeraman

1.3. Don Mathew Rajapaksa (1896-1945), Member of State Council for Hambantota (1936-45), + Emalin (Emalyn) Weeratunga

1.3.1. Lakshman Rajapaksa(1924-1981), Member of Parliament for Hambantota (1947-52, 1956-60), Member of Parliament for Tissamaharama (1960-65), Member of Parliament for Mulkirigala (1976-77)

1.3.2. George Rajapaksa (died 1976), Minister of Health, Member of Parliament for Mulkirigala (1960-76) + Lalitha Samarasekara

1.3.2.1. Nirupama Rajapaksa (born 1962), Deputy Minister of Water Supply & Drainage (2010-), Member of Parliament for Hambantota District (1994-2000, 2005-2015) + Thirukumaran Nadesan
1.3.2.2. Shyamlal Rajapaksa (1966-2009), Member of Southern Provincial Council (1999-2004) + Prashanthi

1.3.3. Esther Gurly Rupasinghe
1.3.4. Pearl (Peri) Jayanthi Gunaratne
1.3.5. Kamala Wickramasuriya

1.3.5.1 Anoma Laphir, Former Co-ordinating Secretary to the President
1.3.5.2 Jaliya Wickramasuriya (born 1960), Former Ambassador to the US
1.3.5.3 Prasanna Wickramasuriya, Former Chairman of Airport and Aviation Services Limited

1.3.6. Neil Kumaradasa Rajapaksa
1.3.7. Ruby Lalitha Rajapaksa + Nandasiri Rajapakse

1.3.7.1 Chithra
1.3.7.2 Kapila
1.3.7.3 Suyama
1.3.7.4 Maneesa

1.4. Don Alwin Rajapaksa (1905-67), Deputy Speaker of Parliament, Government Minister, Member of Parliament for Beliatta (1947-60, 1960-65) + Dandina Samarasinghe Dissanayake* (see Related families below)

1.4.1. Jayanthi Rajapaksa (born 1940)

1.4.1.1. Himal Laleendra Hettiarachchi, CEO of Sky Networks
1.4.1.2. Rangani Hettiarachchi

1.4.2. Chamal Rajapaksa (born 1942), Speaker of Parliament (2010-15), Minister of Irrigation & Water Management (2007-2010), Deputy Minister of Plantation Industries (2004-07), Deputy Minister of Ports Development & Development of the South (2000-01), Member of Parliament for Hambantota District (1989-) + Chandra Malini Wijewardene

1.4.2.1. Shashindra Rajapaksa, Chief Minister of Uva Province (2009-2015), Member of Uva Provincial Council for Monaragala District (2009-), Basnayaka Nilame of the Ruhunu Maha Kataragama Devalaya, Private Secretary to the President
1.4.2.2. Shamindra Rajapaksa, Director SriLankan Airlines (2010-2014), Director of Sri Lanka Telecom (2010-2014)

1.4.3. Mahinda Rajapaksa (born 1945), President (2005-2015), Minister of Defence (2005-2015), Minister of Finance & Planning (2005-2015), Minister of Highways (2010), Minister of Ports & Aviation (2010), Minister of Ports & Highways (2010-2015), Minister of Law & Order (2013-2015), Prime Minister (2004-05) (2018) (2019-22), Leader of Opposition (2002-04) (2018-19), Chief Opposition Whip (2001-02), Minister of Ports (2000-01), Minister of Fisheries & Aquatic Resources Development (1997-01), Minister of Labour & Vocational Training (1994-97), Member of Parliament for Hambantota District (1989-2005), Member of Parliament for Beliatta Electorate (1970-77) + Shiranthi Rajapaksa (née Wickremasinghe)** (see Related families below)

1.4.3.1. Namal Rajapaksa (born 1986), Minister of Youth and Sports (2020-22) Member of Parliament for Hambantota District (2010-), Chairman of Tharunyata Hetak, Owner of Carlton Sports Network
1.4.3.2. Yoshitha Rajapaksa (born 1988), Prime Minister's Chief of Staff, Owner of Carlton Sports Network
1.4.3.3. Rohitha Rajapaksa (born 1989)

1.4.4. Chandra Tudor Rajapaksa (1947-2018), Private Secretary to the Minister of Finance, Private Secretary to the Minister of Ports & Highways

1.4.4.1. Chaminda Rajapaksa, Presidential Adviser, Co-ordinator for Hambantota

1.4.5. Lieutenant Colonel Gotabaya Rajapaksa (born 1949), President (2019-22), former Defence Secretary, Chairman of Lanka Hospitals, Chairman of Lanka Logistics

1.4.5.1. Manoj Rajapaksa

1.4.6. Basil Rajapaksa (born 1951), Minister of Finance (2021-22) Minister of Economic Development (2010-15), Member of Parliament (2007-15), Senior Presidential Advisor (2005-), Chairman of Uthuru Wasanthaya (2009-13) + Pushpa Rajapaksa

1.4.6.1. Thejani Rajapaksa
1.4.6.2. Bimalka Rajapaksa
1.4.6.3. Ashantha Rajapaksa

1.4.7. Dudley Rajapaksa (born 1957)

1.4.7.1. Mihiri Rajapaksa

1.4.8. Preethi Rajapaksa (born 1959) + Lalith Priyalal Chandradasa, Member of Securities & Exchange Commission, Chairman of Sri Lanka Ports Authority, Member of Insurance Board, General Secretary of the Government Medical Officers Association, Chairman of PJ Pharma Care (Ceylon) Ltd, Chairman of MED 1 (Pvt) Ltd, Chairman of Employees Holdings Limited, Chairman of National Aquaculture Development Authority, Chairman of Ceylon Fisheries Harbours Corporation

1.4.8.1. Malaka Chandradasa
1.4.8.2. Madhawa Chandradasa
1.4.8.3. Madini Chandradasa
1.4.8.4. Malika Chandradasa

1.4.9. Chandani (Gandani) Rajapaksa (1961-2017) + Thusitha Ranawaka

1.4.9.1. Eshana Ranawaka
1.4.9.2. Nipuna Ranawaka
1.4.9.3. Randula Ranawaka

== Related families ==
=== Dissanayake ===
2. Samarasinghe Dissanayake

2.1. Dandina Samarasinghe Dissanayake + Don Alwin Rajapaksa (1905-1967), Deputy Speaker of Parliament, Government Minister, Member of Parliament for Beliatta (1947-60, 1960-65)

See Family tree above for descendants

2.2. Nanda Samarasinghe Dissanayake* (d.2012) + Wilbert Weeratunga

2.2.1. Udayanga Weeratunga, Ambassador to the Russian Federation
2.2.2. Ramani Weeratunga
2.2.3. Dayani Weeratunga
2.2.4. Gayani Weeratunga

2.3. Samarasinghe Dissanayake + Kanthi Wakkumbura

=== Wickremasinghe ===
3. Commodore E. P. Wickremasinghe + Violet Wickramasinghe (died 2008)

3.1. Nishantha Wickramasinghe, Chairman of SriLankan Airlines, Chairman of Mihin Lanka

3.1.1. Dilshan Wickramasinghe, CEO of Asset Networks (Pvt) Ltd/Asset Holdings (Pvt) Ltd
3.1.2. Shehan Wickramasinghe, SLAF Pilot.

3.2. Shiranthi Rajapaksa (b. 1947) (née Wickremasinghe)** + Mahinda Rajapaksa (b. 1945), President (2005-), Prime Minister (2004-05), Minister of Fisheries & Aquatic Resources Development (2000-01), Leader of Opposition (2002-04), Chief Opposition Whip (2001-02), Member of Parliament for Beliatta (1970-77), Member of Parliament for Hambantota District (1989-2005)

See Family tree above for descendants

3.3. Srimal Wickramasinghe, Deputy Chief of Mission and Minister at Embassy in Vienna

3.3.1. Tishan Wickramasinghe
3.3.2. Mishan Wickramasinghe

=== Other relatives ===
- Sathya Hettige, Puisne Justice of the Supreme Court of Sri Lanka (2011-2014)
- Janaka Wakkumbura, Member of Parliament for Kalawana, Ratnapura District

== See also ==
- List of political families in Sri Lanka
- Sri Lanka Freedom Party
- Sri Lanka Podujana Peramuna
