= Wickramasuriya =

Wickramasuriya is a surname. Notable people with the surname include:

- Chamod Wickramasuriya (born 1999), Sri Lankan cricketer
- Jaliya Wickramasuriya, Sri Lankan businessmen
- Leonard Merlyn Wickramasuriya (1916–2002), Sri Lanka Army officer
- Prasanna Wickramasuriya, Sri Lanka Army officer
