= 2022 Sri Lankan political crisis =

Political crisis in Sri Lanka

- Part of the Sri Lankan economic crisis and the 2022 Sri Lankan protests
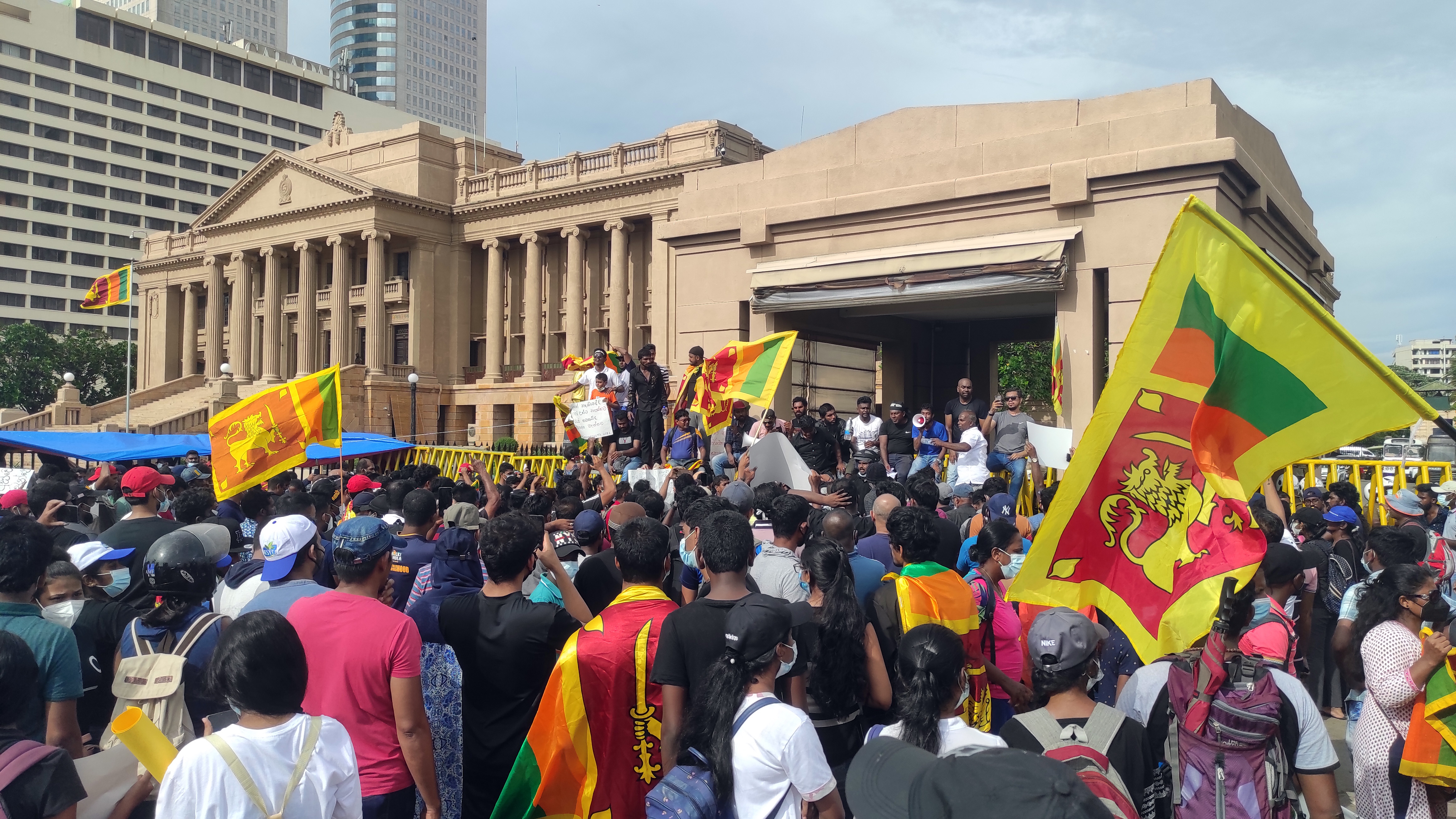
- Protesters protest in front of the Presidential Secretariat
- Date: 3 April 2022 – November 2022
- Location: Sri Lanka
- Caused by: 2019–present Sri Lankan economic crisis; 2022 Sri Lankan protests
- Status: President Gotabaya Rajapaksa refuses to step down despite calls from protestors and opposition to impeach the President.; Gotabaya forms a temporary 4-member cabinet on 3 April 2022.; The Samagi Jana Balawegaya, led by its party leader Sajith Premadasa, has called for a no-confidence motion against the government.; PM Mahinda Rajapaksa resigned from his position on 9 May 2022.; President Gotabaya Rajapaksa appointed Ranil Wickremesinghe as the new PM on 12 May 2022.; On 9 July, Rajapaksa announces his intention to resign as President of Sri Lanka on 13 July 2022.; Rajapaksa flees the country on 13 July, fails to resign as pledged, and designates Wickremesinghe acting president in his absence.; Gotabaya Rajapaksa arrives in Singapore and resigns as President via e-mail on 14 July.; Ranil Wickremesinghe is elected as the President by the Parliament on 20 July.

Lead figures
Gotabaya Rajapaksa (President of Sri Lanka); Mahinda Rajapaksa (Prime Minister of Sri Lanka until his resignation on 9 May 2022)	Non-centralized leadership

The 2022 Sri Lankan political crisis was a political crisis in Sri Lanka due to the power struggle between President Gotabaya Rajapaksa and the people of Sri Lanka. It was fueled by the anti-government protests and demonstrations by the public due to the economic crisis in the country. The anti-government sentiment across various parts of Sri Lanka has triggered significant political instability in the nation.

The political crisis began on 3 April 2022, after all 26 members of the Second Gotabaya Rajapaksa cabinet with the exception of Prime Minister Rajapaksa resigned en masse overnight. Some critics argued that the resignation did not follow constitutional protocol, questioning its validity, and several were reinstated in different ministries the next day. There were even growing calls on forming a caretaker government to run the country or for snap elections, but the latter option was deemed unviable due to paper shortages and concerns over election expenditure, which would often cost in billions.

Protestors have taken to streets to show their anger and displeasure over the mismanagement of the economy by the government and the protestors urged the President Gotabaya to immediately step down for a political change; he refused to do so, later eventually fleeing to Singapore and resigning on 14 July. Main opposition Samagi Jana Balawegaya had determined to abolish the 20th amendment by bringing a private members Bill in order to scrap the executive powers of Executive Presidency.

== Background ==
=== After the 2019 and 2020 elections ===
The Sri Lanka Podujana Peramuna (SLPP) recorded a landslide victory with a majority during the 2020 Sri Lankan parliamentary election. The SLPP gained the support of the majority Sinhala Buddhists, which was part of the election manifesto by the party during its election campaign. The SLPP government also gained majority support thanks to its handling of the first wave of the COVID-19 pandemic. Gotabaya was elected as the 7th executive President of Sri Lanka during the 2019 presidential election, who won with a majority of 6.9 million votes. His military background and role as defense secretary in ending the 26-year Sri Lankan Civil War in May 2009 contributed to his public image.

He received significant public attention and support, as reported by, when he was nominated as the presidential candidate for the 2019 elections, after Sri Lanka was still reeling from the aftermath of the 2019 Easter Sunday bombings. The government was formed, with former Sri Lankan President Mahinda Rajapaksa being appointed as the Prime Minister. Most members of the Rajapaksa family secured important ministerial portfolios in the newly formed government in 2020, with Chamal Rajapaksa being appointed as Minister of Agriculture, Namal Rajapaksa appointed as the Minister of Sports and Youth Affairs, and Basil Rajapaksa appointed as the Minister of Finance. The opposition accused the government of nepotism, with five members of the Rajapaksa family being in the ruling party's government. The government stated that the appointments were based on preferential votes and the mandate from the 2020 parliamentary election, though this claim is contested.

=== 2021 onwards ===
The year 2021 saw a decline in the popularity of the Gotabaya Rajapaksa-led government, with criticism arising from various stakeholders regarding its policy implementation. Although the government was credited for its successful handling of the first wave of the pandemic and for its successful vaccination drives amid misinformation about vaccines, the popularity of the Rajapaksa-led government began diminishing from 2021 due to its poor handling of the economy.

Moreover, the decision to ban chemical fertilizers overnight created significant backlash, particularly from farmers who criticized the move. Reports suggest that Gotabaya consulted Vandana Shiva, an Indian scholar and anti-GMO activist, for the decision, although this has not been independently confirmed. Gotabaya announced plans to make Sri Lanka the first country in the world to adopt 100% organic farming. The chemical fertilizer ban was linked to a decrease in agricultural yield, which some critics attribute to the policy decision. The impact of a sudden chemical fertiliser ban was felt with the purchasing behavior of public as Sri Lanka witnessed lengthy queues to buy important essential food items and other stuff including sugar, milk powder, kerosene oil and cooking gas.

In September 2021, the government declared an economic emergency, as the situation was further aggravated by the falling national currency exchange rate, inflation rising as result of high food prices, and pandemic restrictions in tourism which further decreased the country's income. The government invoked emergency regulations to control prices of essential food items. The government accused the traders and businesses for hoarding essential food items such as sugar and milk powder, which according to government led to massive food shortages. Government officials stated that the Sri Lankan media coverage contributed to public fears, though media outlets have denied this claim. It was reported that the national emergency was declared on 30 August 2021 and the Parliament of Sri Lanka approved it on 6 September 2021. In November 2021, Sri Lanka abandoned its plan to become the world's first organic farming nation following rising food prices and weeks of protests against the plan.

Reports of gas cylinder explosions in houses and hotels raised public safety concerns and criticism of government oversight as many people started to use electric cookers and ovens due to fear of using biogas. A decline in foreign reserves led to restrictions on imports. The first part of the import ban was imposed on motor vehicles, which angered the vehicle importers as it severely affected their livelihoods. The threat of the Delta variant also further dampened any hopes of recovery for the tourism industry. In addition, foreign remittances to Sri Lanka also began declining in 2021, which further dented the country's GDP. The government also faced continuous strikes by school teachers, demanding higher salaries, with teachers engaging in online education strikes, which disrupted school education.

=== Ugandan links ===
On 14 April 2021, SriLankan Airlines, the national flag carrier, claimed on Twitter that the airline's cargo division had operated three successive cargo charter flights to Entebbe International Airport in Uganda, airlifting over 102 metric tonnes of printed material in February 2021. The information on what the printed material was were not revealed by the airline due to air cargo confidentiality. It later deleted the tweet for unknown reasons, and it created doubts about the transparency of SriLankan Airlines and speculations arose about the transfer of "printed papers" cargo charter flights which departed to Uganda in February 2021.

SriLankan Airlines later issued a statement claiming that the printed material which was airlifted to Uganda only included Ugandan shillings, and it further revealed that due to security issues with bordering Kenya, the Ugandan government preferred to obtain the printed Ugandan shillings notes from a global security printer. The Biyagama branch of the De La Rue company is responsible for printing currency notes to multiple countries, including Uganda. SriLankan Airlines insisted that the consignment was purely commercial in nature and brought much needed foreign revenue to the airlines as well as for the country.

Several sources claimed that prime minister Mahinda Rajapaksa had maintained close ties with Uganda, especially during his second term as president from 2010 to 2015. Mahinda Rajapaksa was also reported to have befriended the Sri Lankan High Commissioner to Uganda, Velupillai Kananathan, during his first official presidential trip to Uganda in 2014.

Uganda had been targeted for a possible blacklisting by the FATF, for falling to comply with anti-money laundering laws and for continuously engaging in various financial crimes. The news of Uganda's possible blacklisting due to money laundering went viral in Sri Lanka among protestors and social media users, with speculations circulated on social media that members of the Rajapaksa family and other politicians might have transferred wealth to Uganda via SriLankan Airlines cargo flights.

=== Aspen Medical links ===
In May 2022, Australian investigative journalism program Four Corners alleged that Aspen Medical, an Australian health service company, had been involved in a high-profile money laundering scandal following its involvement in the construction of the multi-million dollar Hambantota General Hospital during Mahinda Rajapaksa's presidency in 2012. According to the Four Corners documentary, the company had obtained an $18.8 million insurance guarantee from the Australian government, through Export Finance Australia, the country's export credit agency

The payments made by Aspen Medical in Sri Lanka amounted to €1.4 million (equivalent to US$2.1 million), and was made to a shell company domiciled in the British Virgin Islands, called Sabre Vision Holdings, which was owned by Nimal Perera, a Sri Lankan businessman who has close ties with the Rajapaksa family. Perera claimed that in 2016, he collected the funds for sports minister Namal Rajapaksa, and as a result, he was arrested and released on bail shortly later. After the release of the documentary, Perera denied wrongdoing and insisted that it is a conspiracy to undermine his reputation by the Rajapaksa government.

== Protests ==
Sri Lankans took to the streets calling on the President and the government to step down. Many young adults, including university students, took part in peaceful protests calling for a major overhaul of the system and urged lawmakers to pave way for youngsters to lead the country. Protestors also demanded the removal of the 20th amendment to the Sri Lankan Constitution, as well as the abolition of the Executive Presidency. Few protestors also urged all 225 MPs to go home to elect new faces in the parliament. During the protests, there were growing calls to elect educated academic people to parliament and also there were calls to reveal the net worth and assets of the politicians.

== Political instability ==
Political instability grew with the resignation of 26 cabinet ministers on 3 April 2022. The resignations were deemed null and void, according to the provisions of Twentieth Amendment to the Constitution of Sri Lanka, as the ministers tendered their resignations to the Prime Minister instead of the President. The Sports and Youth Minister and Prime Minister Mahinda Rajapaksa's son Namal Rajapaksa, brothers Chamal Rajapaksa and Basil Rajapaksa also resigned.

The president immediately made major steps to form an all-party interim government and invited all the parties to form a new government as a temporary solution up until the 2022 Sri Lankan presidential election and next Sri Lankan parliamentary election in 2025. The all party interim government would still have both President and Prime Minister unchanged but the cabinet of ministers would have included members representing various parties. The main oppositions SJB and JVP declined the proposal and urged the entire government including the President to resign. There were rumours and speculations regarding the fact that Mahinda Rajapaksa would resign from his position as Prime Minister but the rumours were deemed false as it was revealed that Mahinda would stay in power.

On 4 April 2022, a temporary cabinet with four ministers was formed by Gotabaya Rajapaksa and these four ministers who were part of the cabinet ministries which resigned due to the crisis had been reshuffled to different ministerial positions. In the cabinet reshuffle, Ali Sabry was appointed as Finance Minister, G. L. Peiris was appointed as Foreign Minister, Dinesh Gunawardena was appointed as Education Minister, and Johnston Fernando was appointed as Minister of Highways. On 5 April, Ali Sabry tendered his resignation as Minister of Finance, having served only one day in office. In addition, he also intended to resign from his national list MP post. Sabry then revoked his resignation and remains as the finance minister.

On 5 April, the parliament reconvened for the first time since the state of emergency began and were set to discuss the current state of affairs. The ruling SLPP government began losing the support of its key allies consisting of 41 MPs: 9 MPs of the Sri Lanka Podujana Peramuna (SLPP) decided to move away from the government and to work as independent persons, while the Sri Lanka Freedom Party (SLFP), the Ceylon Workers' Congress (CWC) and the All Ceylon Makkal Congress (ACMC) left the government and moved into opposition. MP Harin Fernando urged to make Harsha de Silva as Sri Lankan President for at least six months with the former indicating Harsha's wide knowledge and understanding about the economy.

On 6 April 2022, the opposition party SJB held placards and protested inside Parliament demanding that Gotabaya Rajapaksa resign immediately. The SJB party said that it would try to bring a no-confidence motion in Parliament if the President and Prime Minister do not step down.

On 7 April 2022, the private sector of Sri Lanka collectively in writing made a request to restore political stability in order to foster the economy. Around 38 organizations collectively representing exporters, importers, manufacturers, shipping and logistics sector and tourism sector have appealed to the parliament to resolve the economic crisis to prevent catastrophe. On 7 April 2022, the Chamber of Young Lankan Entrepreneurs (COYLE) had also made an appeal to the government to solve the current economic and political crisis and had warned that if the issue had not been addressed with due diligence it could lead to closure of businesses.

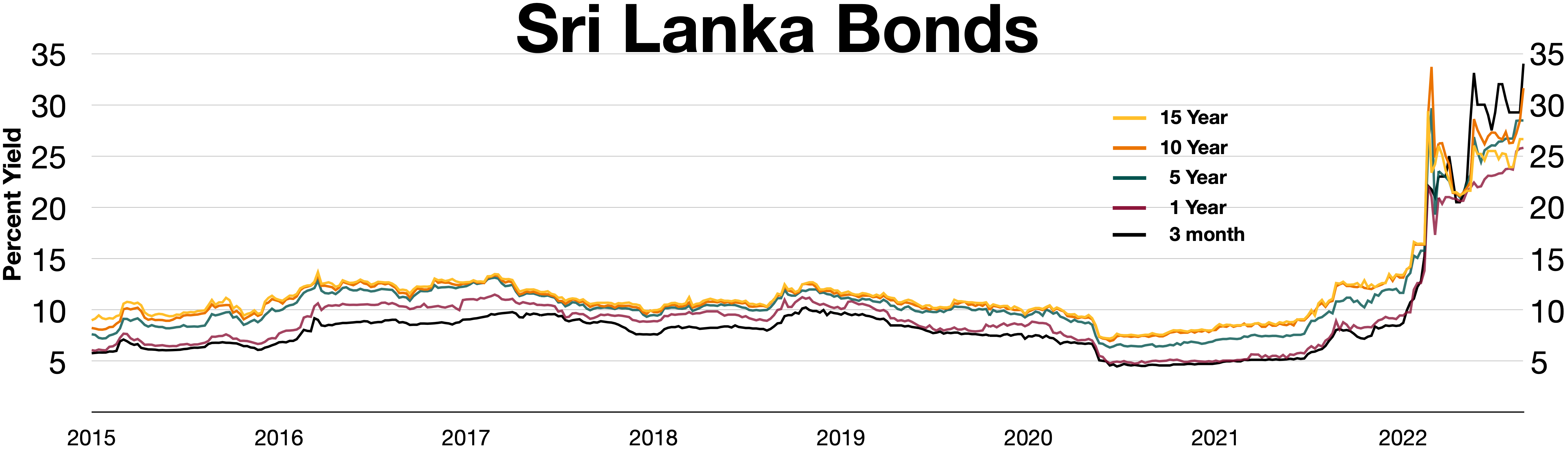
Sri Lanka bonds spiked in 2022 Inverted yield curve in the first half of 2022 15 year bonds 10 year bonds 5 year bonds 1 year bonds 6 month bonds

Newly appointed Finance minister Ali Sabry had pleaded for political stability and insisted that Sri Lanka needs an immediate bailout or a moratorium from multilateral agencies such as the IMF, World Bank and Asian Development Bank. He also insisted that there are no other options except to seek assistance from multilateral agencies to cope up with the crisis and especially he called on the government to restructure the US$1 billion ISB bond repayment which matures around July 2022.

On 8 April 2022, former World Bank official Shanta Devarajan had warned that the biggest risk Sri Lanka is going to face is the social unrest and turmoil. He highlighted that cash transfer program can be initiated aiming at helping the poor people in addition to reduction in subsidies on food and fuel in order to avoid the collapse of the economy. Moody's Investors Service had warned that the wave of resignation of cabinet ministers would only heighten policy uncertainty and as a result it will make hard when obtaining or borrowing external finance.

On 9 May 2022, Prime Minister Mahinda Rajapaksa submitted his letter of resignation amidst mass anti-government protests. Sri Lanka's economic crisis is primarily the result of internal factors, including mismanagement and corruption.

In early 2022, Sri Lankans faced power cuts and shortages of basics like fuel. Only Sri Lanka's political crisis caused inflation to rise to 50% per annum.

=== New government ===
On 18 April 2022, Gotabaya appointed a new 17 member cabinet despite the protests calling the entire government to resign including the president alongside all 225 MPs in parliament. Dinesh Gunawardena was appointed as Public Administration, Internal Affairs minister while Douglas Devananda was appointed as Fisheries minister, Kanaka Herath was appointed as Highways minister, Dilum Amunugama was appointed as Transport & Industries minister, Prasanna Ranatunga was appointed as Public security and tourism minister, Channa Jayasumana was appointed as Health minister, Nalaka Godahewa was appointed as Media minister, Pramitha Tennakoon was appointed as Ports and Shipping minister, Amith Thenuka Vidanagamage was appointed as Sports & Youth Affairs ministry, Kanchana Wijesekera was appointed as Power & Energy minister, Asanka Shehan Semasinghe was appointed as Trade & Samurdhi Development minister, Janaka Wakkumbura was appointed as Agriculture & Irrigation minister, Vidura Wickremanayake was appointed as Labour minister, Mohan Priyadarshana De Silva was appointed as Water supply minister, Ramesh Pathirana was appointed as Education & Plantation Industries, Wimalaweera Dissanayake was appointed as Widelife & Forest Resources Conservation minister and Ahamed Nazeer Zainulabdeen was appointed as Environment minister. In the new cabinet portfolio, female representation was completely excluded with all 17 ministers are being males.

=== Prime minister ===
On 11 May 2022, Gotabaya Rajapaksa had secret closed-door meeting and discussions with former prime minister and UNP leader Ranil Wickremasinghe about the political situation and critics speculated that Ranil could well be appointed as new prime minister of the country for at least six months. The meeting also had concluded with Gotabaya giving an offer to Ranil to take up the PM post. It was revealed that Gotabaya also contacted opposition leader Sajith Premadasa with the former recommending Sajith to take up the premier post but it was declined by Sajith. Sajith insisted that he would take up the prime minister role only if Gotabaya resigns as president. The SJB party revealed that it will not form a government as long as Gotabaya remains in the office. Some members of his party, including Harin Fernando expressed their disappointment and dissent over Sajith's demands and conditions at a time when the country is in critical juncture and crossroads. Harin decided to part ways with SJB and insisted that he would serve as independent member in the parliament.

There were also reports suggesting that Sarath Fonseka might have accepted the prime minister role but Fonseka denied such reports insisting that he wouldn't take up any position in a government headed by Gotabaya. The SLFP leader and former president Maithripala Sirisena revealed to the media that a letter had been sent to Gotabaya by 11 political parties and independent parliamentary group nominating and proposing three names as candidates for PM post including Nimal Siripala de Silva, Dullas Alahapperuma and Wijeyadasa Rajapakshe.

On 12 May 2022, Ranil Wickremesinghe was sworn in as prime minister for record sixth time. He has been assured the support of the Sri Lanka Podujana Peramuna members of parliament, while other parties have refused to join his cabinet.

=== President and Prime Minister homes breached and resignations ===
On 9 July 2022, amid reports that their homes were stormed and burned, Gotabaya and Wickremesinghe both agreed to resign from their respective posts as Sri Lanka's president and Prime Minister. Political parties including the Opposition agreed to form an all-party interim government after the President's resignation. The whereabouts of the President remained unknown to the public and on 11 July, the Speaker of the Parliament announced that the President was still in Sri Lanka.

According to the Speaker on 12 July, following President's resignation on 13 July, parliament would elect a new president on 20 July, after calling for nominations on 19 July.

In the morning of 13 July, Rajapaksa left Sri Lanka via military aircraft of Sri Lanka Air Force to the Maldives from where he issued a gazette stating that he is "unable to exercise, perform and discharge the powers, duties and functions of the Office of the President" by reason of his absence from Sri Lanka and that he appoints Ranil Wickremesinghe as acting president under Article 37 (1) of Sri Lanka's constitution during his absence. He formally resigned a day later after a further flight from the Maldives to Singapore.

== Acting of President of Sri Lanka ==
Name	Portrait	Party	Tenure
Mahinda Yapa Abeywardena	Mahinda Yapa Abeywardena	Sri Lanka Podujana Peramuna	20 August 2020 – 20 August 2020

=== Electing new President ===
On 15 July, Ranil Wickremesinghe swore in as the acting president, taking his oath of office before Chief Justice Jayantha Jayasuriya. To complete the remainder of Gotabaya Rajapaksa's term, a president was elected by the Parliament of Sri Lanka in a secret ballot on 20 July 2022. Wickremesinghe defeated his main rival Dullus Alahapperuma, with 134 votes to 82, becoming the ninth President of Sri Lanka.

On 22 July, Wickremesinghe appointed Dinesh Gunawardena, leader of the Mahajana Eksath Peramuna and MP for the Sri Lanka Podujana Peramuna, as new prime minister.

== See also ==
- 2018 Sri Lankan constitutional crisis
