= Udayanga Weeratunga =

Sri Lankan businessman

- Born: Sri Lanka
- Education: Nalanda College Colombo
- Occupation: Businessmen
- Known for: former Sri Lankan ambassador Russian Federation
- Relatives: Mahinda Rajapaksa; Gotabhaya Rajapaksa; Jaliya Wickramasuriya; Prasanna Wickramasuriya

Ambassador of Sri Lanka to the Russian Federation
- In office 16 November 2006 – 2015
- Preceded by: Neville Ranasuriya
- Succeeded by: Saman Weerasinghe

Udayanga Weeratunga is a Sri Lankan businessman who was the Ambassador Extraordinary and Plenipotentiary of the Democratic Socialist Republic of Sri Lanka to the Russian Federation from 2006 to 2015. Weeratunga is a first cousin of President Mahinda Rajapaksa.

== Early life and education ==
Udayanga was born in Medamulana and received his education from Nalanda College, Colombo.

Udayanga is the cousin of Mahinda Rajapakse, with their respective mothers being sisters.

== Career ==
Weeratunga presented his Letter of Credence to the president Vladimir Putin of Russia on 16 November 2006. He served as the ambassador to Russia until president Rajapaksa's defeat in the 2015 Sri Lankan presidential election.

=== Arms Sale ===
In 2015, Weeratunga was accused by the Ukrainian government of arms sales to the separatist rebels fighting government forces in Ukraine. The Sri Lankan government investigated these allegations and withdrew his diplomatic passport. The Financial Crimes Investigation Division applied for, but did not receive, an Interpol warrant for his arrest on 30 September 2016.

=== MiG-27 purchase controversy ===
Weeratunge was arrested in Dubai on 4 February 2018, by international police based on a request made by Sri Lankan Authorities.

Weeratunga was extradited from Dubai to Sri Lanka on February 14, 2020, and arrested by officers of the Criminal Investigation Department (CID) on charges of kickbacks and money laundering from the Sri Lankan military's 2006 purchase of four second-hand MiG-27 aircraft from Ukraine. At the time of the purchase, president Rajapaksa was the secretary to the ministry of defence.

Sixteen banks accounts of Weeratunga had been suspended by the courts in January 2017 due to allegations of fraud in the purchase of Mig-27 fighters. The case is ongoing without Weeratunga not attending the court. Investigations had revealed that funds amounting to a total of US$1.5 million had been deposited at various times to the sixteen accounts belonging to him with the Sri Lankan Air Force claiming that they are unable to locate the original purchase contract, which is said to have been signed in the presence of the Weeratunga.

== See also ==
- List of Sri Lankan non-career diplomats
