= Medamulana Walawwa =

Residence of the Rajapaksa family

- Alternative names: Medamulana; Carlton House

General information
- Classification: Bungalow/Walauwa
- Location: Beliatta, Hambantota District Sri Lanka
- Owner: Rajapaksa family

Medamulana Walawwa (also known as Medamulana and the Carlton House) is the ancestral home of the Rajapaksa family. It is a walawwa located in Beliatta, Hambantota District, Sri Lanka.

It was the home of Don David Rajapaksa, the Vidane Arachchi of the Ihala Valikada Korale. His son D. A. Rajapaksa became a State Councillor for Hambantota and a Member of Parliament, who represented the Beliatta electorate. His son Mahinda Rajapaksa served as President of Sri Lanka from 2005 to 2015. As such it has become the political seat of the Rajapaksa family.

On May 9, 2022, protestors destroyed the home setting it ablaze in response to the ongoing economic crisis since 2019. Mahinda Rajapaksa was not present during the arrival of the protestors.

== See also ==
- Woodlands, Colombo
