= 2014 Uva Provincial Council election =

6th Sri Lankan provincial council election in Uva Province
- 20 September 2014

34 seats across one provincial council
- Turnout: 76.15%
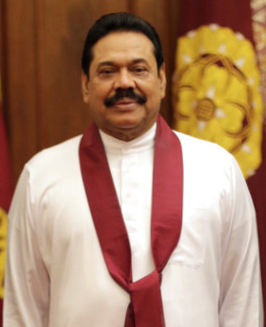

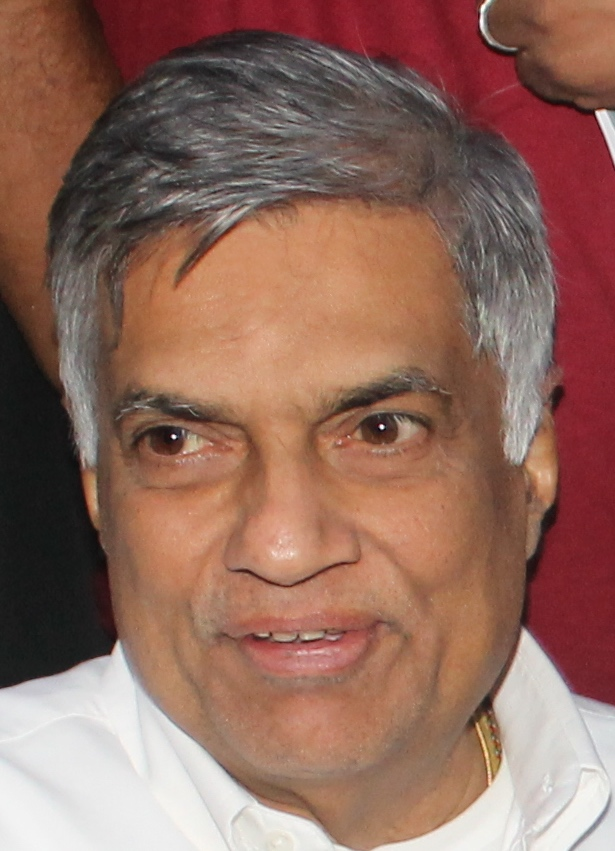
	First party	Second party	Third party
Leader	Mahinda Rajapaksa	Ranil Wickremasinghe	Anura Kumara Dissanayake
Party	UPFA	UNP	JVP
Last election	72.39%, 25 seats	22.32%, 7 seats	2.53%, 1 seat
Seat change	▼6	▲6	▲1
Popular vote	349,906	274,773	36,580
Percentage	51.25%	40.24%	5.36%
Swing	▼21.14%	▲17.92%	▲2.83%
Councillors	19	13	2
Councils	1	0	0
Chief Minister before election
Shasheendra Rajapaksa
UPFA
Elected Chief Minister
Shasheendra Rajapaksa
UPFA

Provincial council elections were held in Sri Lanka on 20 September 2014 to elect 34 members to one of the nine provincial councils in the country. 0.9 million Sri Lankans were eligible to vote in the election. Elections to the remaining eight provincial councils were not due as they had their last election in 2012, 2013 or 2014 (Mar).

The United People's Freedom Alliance's domination of Sri Lankan elections continued as expected. It retained control of Uva Provincial Council. However, the UPFA recorded a loss of votes in the province, after Presidential Election 2015 number of UPFA councillors crossed over to UNP to back Harin Fernando which enabled him to secure the position of Chief Minister and toppling the UPFA rule in Uva Province. After the 2015 General election Harin Fernando resigned from the Chief Minister position to take duties as a cabinet minister, Chamara Sampath Dassanayake was appointed. In September 2015, the council was turned into a unity government with United National Party MP Upali Samaraweera was given a minister position and rest of the 3 ministers were appointed from Sri Lanka Freedom Party.

After 12 years of postpoment the next election will be held Provincial Council election 2026

== Results ==
The UPFA retained control of the Uva provincial council.

Election results
Alliances and parties	Badulla			Monaragala			Bonus Seats	Total		
Alliances and parties	Votes	%	Seats	Votes	%	Seats	Bonus Seats	Votes	%	Seats
United People's Freedom Alliance	209,056	47.37%	9	140,850	58.34%	8	2	349,906	51.246%	19
United National Party	197,708	44.79%	8	77,065	31.92%	5	0	274,773	40.242%	13
Janatha Vimukthi Peramuna	20,625	4.67%	1	15,955	6.61%	1	0	36,580	5.357%	2
Democratic Party	3202	0.73%	0	2,874	1.19%	0	0	6,076	0.890%	0
Democratic Unity Alliance	5045	1.14%	0				0	5,045	0.739%	0
National Freedom Front	4,835	1.10%	0				0	4,835	0.708%	0
Independents	639	0.15%	0	4065	1.69%	0	0	4,707	0.689%	0
Our National Front				202	0.08%	0	0	202	0.030%	0
Jana Setha Peramuna	119	0.03%	0	54	0.02%	0	0	173	0.025%	0
United Socialist Party				162	0.07%	0	0	162	0.024%	0
Eksath Lanka Podujana Pakshaya				124	0.05%	0	0	124	0.018%	0
Eksath Lanka Maha Sabha Party	83	0.02%	0	36	0.01%	0	0	119	0.017%	0
Maubima Janatha Pakshaya	37	0.01%	0	17	0.01%	0	0	54	0.008%	0
Sri Lanka Labour Party	22	0.00%	0	10	0.00%	0	0	32	0.005%	0
Liberal Party				12	0.00%	0	0	12	0.002%	0
Valid Votes	441,371	95.38%	18	241,426	94.94%	14	2	682,797	95.22%	34
Rejected Votes	21,398	4.62%		12,871	5.06%			34,269	4.78%	
Total Polled	462,769			254,297				717,066		
Registered Electors	609,966			332,764				942,730		
Turnout	75.87%			76.42%				76.06%		
