= Ranawaka =

Ranawaka is a surname. Notable people with the surname include:

- Champika Ranawaka (born 1965), Sri Lankan electrical engineer
- Daminda Ranawaka (born 1983), Sri Lankan cricketer
- Nipuna Ranawaka (born 1990), Sri Lankan businessman
- Sarath Ranawaka (1951–2009), Sri Lankan politician
- Udaya Ranawaka (fl. 2003), Sri Lankan neurologist
