= Sri Lankan provincial council elections, 2014 =

Sri Lankan provincial council elections, 2014 may refer to:

- March 2014 Sri Lankan provincial council elections
- September 2014 Sri Lankan provincial council election
