= List of chief ministers of Uva Province =

Chief Minister of Uva Province
- Flag of Uva Province
- Incumbent; Vacant since 9 October 2019
- Board of Ministers of the Uva Province
- Style: The Honourable
- Member of: Uva Provincial Council
- Appointer: Governor of Uva Province
- Inaugural holder: Percy Samaraweera
- Formation: 3 February 1988
- Website: Uva Provincial Council

The chief minister of Uva Province, Sri Lanka, is the head of the provincial board of ministers, a body which aids and advises the governor, the head of the provincial government, in the exercise of his executive power. The governor appoints as chief minister the member of the Uva Provincial Council who, in his opinion, commands the support of a majority of that council.

== Chief ministers ==
Sri Lanka Freedom Party United National Party

No.	Name	Portrait	Party	Took office	Left office	Refs
1	Percy Samaraweera		United National Party	16 September 1988	6 June 1998	
Vacant (6 June 1998 – April 1999)
2	Nalini Weerawanni		Sri Lanka Freedom Party	April 1999	April 1999	
3	Samaraweera Weerawanni		Sri Lanka Freedom Party	April 1999	29 October 2001	
4	Aththintha Marakalage Buddhadasa		Sri Lanka Freedom Party	29 October 2001	22 July 2004	
5	Gamini Vijith Vijithamuni Soysa		Sri Lanka Freedom Party	22 July 2004	20 August 2009	
6	Shasheendra Rajapaksa		Sri Lanka Freedom Party	20 August 2009	14 January 2015	
7	Harin Fernando		United National Party	14 January 2015	September 2015	
8	Chamara Sampath Dassanayake		Sri Lanka Freedom Party	15 September 2015	9 October 2019	
Vacant (since 9 October 2019)
