= Charles Edirisuriya =

Sri Lankan politician

Hon. Charles Edirisuriya

Member of the Ceylon Parliament for Hambantota
- In office 1952–1956
- Preceded by: Lakshman Rajapaksa
- Succeeded by: Lakshman Rajapaksa

Member of Parliament for Tissamaharama
- In office 1965–1970
- Preceded by: Lakshman Rajapaksa
- Succeeded by: Tennyson Edirisuriya

Personal details
- Born: Charles Francis Warnakula Edirisuriya; 10 August 1895 Hathagala, Ambalantota, Sri Lanka
- Died: 2 July 1986 (aged 90)
- Party: Ceylon National Congress, Sri Lanka Freedom Party, United National Party
- Spouse: Henrietta
- Children: Danister, Chithrangani, Shrimal
- Education: Richmond College, Galle
- Occupation: Politics

Charles Edirisuriya (10 August 1895 –2 July 1986) was a Sri Lankan politician.

Charles Edirisuriya was born 10 August 1895 at Hathagala, Ambalantota. He was the second son of Jakolis Warnakula Edirisuriya (a prominent planter and the Vidana Arachchi of Pahala Kanuketiya) and Amadoru née Jayawardena. He was educated at Richmond College, Galle.

Edirisuriya became an active member of the Ceylon National Congress and started his political life in rural politics where he became chairman of the Kanuketiya village council. At the first parliamentary general election in 1947 he contested the Hambantota electorate, where he narrowly lost to Lakshman Rajapaksa, by a mere 400 votes. He was however successful at the 1952 general elections where he won the seat of Hambantota with a majority of almost 4,000 votes. He lost the seat at the 1956 elections to his rival Rajapaksa by 11,554 votes.

Edirisuriya contested the newly created Tissamaharama electorate at both the March 1960 General Elections and the subsequent July 1960 General Elections losing on both occasions to Rajapaksa. At the 1965 general elections he again contested the Tissamaharama electorate however this time as the Sri Lanka Freedom Party candidate where he was elected, narrowly defeating the sitting member, Rajapaska, by 236 votes. In August 1965 he resigned from the SLFP and joined the United National Party parliamentary group but refused the post of Deputy Minister of Agriculture, which he was offered.

At the 1970 General Elections he contested the seat of Tissamaharama as the UNP candidate, losing to the SLFP candidate, Tennyson Edirisuriya.
