= Harin Fernando =

Sri Lankan politician

Hon. Harin Fernando
- හරීන් ප්‍රනාන්දු ஹரின் பெர்னாண்டோ
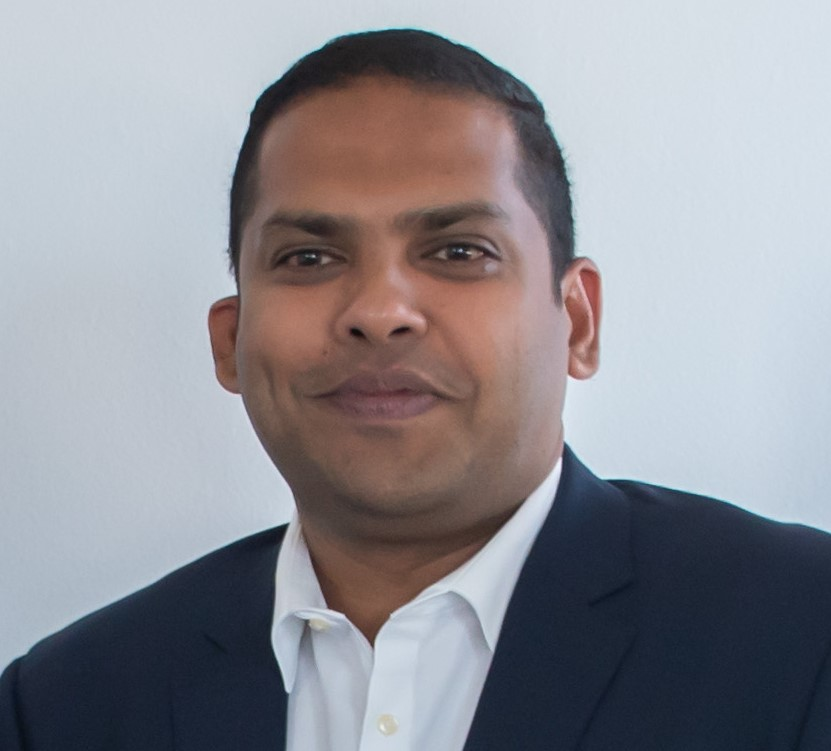

Minister of Sports and Youth Affairs
- In office 27 November 2023 – 09 August 2024
- President: Ranil Wickremesinghe
- Prime Minister: Dinesh Gunawardena
- Preceded by: Roshan Ranasinghe
- In office 20 December 2018 – 17 November 2019
- President: Maithripala Sirisena
- Prime Minister: Ranil Wickremesinghe
- Preceded by: Faiszer Musthapha
- Succeeded by: Dullas Alahapperuma

Minister of Tourism and Lands
- In office 20 May 2022 – 09 August 2024
- President: Gotabaya Rajapaksa; Ranil Wickremesinghe
- Prime Minister: Ranil Wickremesinghe; Dinesh Gunawardena
- Preceded by: Prasanna Ranatunga

Minister of Foreign Employment Promotion and Welfare
- In office 25 February 2018 – 26 October 2018
- President: Maithripala Sirisena
- Prime Minister: Ranil Wickremesinghe
- Preceded by: Thalatha Atukorale
- In office 20 December 2018 – 17 November 2019
- President: Maithripala Sirisena
- Prime Minister: Ranil Wickremesinghe

Minister of Telecommunications and Digital Infrastructure
- In office 4 September 2015 – 26 October 2018
- President: Maithripala Sirisena
- Prime Minister: Ranil Wickremesinghe
- In office 20 December 2018 – 17 November 2019
- President: Maithripala Sirisena
- Prime Minister: Ranil Wickremesinghe

7th Chief Minister of Uva Province
- In office 14 January 2015 – 1 September 2015
- Governor: M. P. Jayasinghe
- Preceded by: Shashindra Rajapaksa
- Succeeded by: Chamara Sampath Dassanayake

Member of Parliament for National List
- In office 20 August 2020 – 09 August 2024

Member of Parliament for Badulla District
- In office 1 September 2015 – 3 March 2020
- Majority: 200,806 Preferential Votes
- In office 22 April 2010 – 5 August 2014
- Majority: 49,073 Preferential Votes

Personal details
- Born: 28 October 1978 (age 47) Wattala, Sri Lanka
- Party: United National Party (2005–2020, 2023–present)
- Other political affiliations: Samagi Jana Balawegaya (2020–2023)
- Spouse: Malsha Kumarathunga
- Parent: Nihal Benito Fernando,
- Education: St. Joseph's College, Colombo
- Occupation: Politician
- Profession: Businessman

Harin Fernando, MP (born 28 October 1978) is a Sri Lankan politician, former Cabinet Minister and Member of Parliament. He is the former Minister of Tourism and Lands as well as the former Minister of Sports and Youth Affairs. He previously served as the Minister of Sports before, as well as the Telecommunication, Digital Infrastructure Facilities, Foreign Employment, and Tourism ministers in previous Sri Lankan governments. He was the 7th Chief Minister of Uva Province.

== Early life and education ==
Born in Wattala to a Roman Catholic family, Fernando was educated at St. Joseph's College, Colombo.

== Political career ==
Fernando was appointed as the United National Party (UNP) electoral organizer for Badulla District when he was only 27 and won the highest number of votes in the Uva Provincial Council Election in 2005. He was elected as a Member of Parliament for the Badulla District in 2010 and resigned on 5 August 2014 to contest as candidate for Chief Minister of Uva Province. Even though Fernando won the highest number of preferential votes, the UNP lost in Uva Provincial Council elections. Fernando became the leader of the opposition in the Uva Provincial Council.

Fernando played a critical role in President Mahinda Rajapaksa's defeat in the 2015 presidential elections, after Rajapaksa called for an early election where the UPFA won narrowly at the Uva Provincial Council elections. Fernando had strongly criticised the Rajapaksa regime for its corruption, authoritarian rule and rise of lawlessness. Harin's criticisms significantly reduced Rajapaksa's popularity in Badulla and Monaragala. Fernando openly campaigned for the common candidate Maithripala Sirisena in the elections.

Soon after the elections, a number of UPFA provincial councillors backed Fernando, thus giving the UNP a majority in the Uva provincial council. He was sworn in as Chief Minister of Uva Province before the Governor and succeeded Shasheendra Rajapaksa. In August 2015, Fernando was elected to parliament, gaining the highest votes in the Badulla District. Shortly afterwards he was appointed as Cabinet Minister of Telecommunications and Digital Infrastructure.

Fernando criticized Facebook for being too slow to combat social media users who had used Facebook and WhatsApp to plan and facilitate the anti-Muslim riots in Sri Lanka.

On 20 May 2022, amidst the 2022 Sri Lankan protests and political crisis, Fernando was sworn in as the Minister of Tourism and Lands and officially became a member of the Rajapaksa-Wickremesinghe led cabinet, against the wishes of his own party, the Samagi Jana Balawegaya (SJB). He and fellow minister Manusha Nanayakkara had subsequently been suspended from the SJB. Both ministers would later resign from their ministerial portfolios on 9 July 2022, but would again be reappointed to their same positions by President Ranil Wickremesinghe on 22 July 2022. A year later, on 18 July 2023, the Working Committee of the SJB expelled Harin Fernando and Manusha Nanayakkara from the party. Shortly afterwards, on 2 August 2023, Fernando and Nanayakkara were readmitted into the United National Party by the party's working committee.

On 9 August 2024, the Supreme Court of Sri Lanka ruled that the decision by the Samagi Jana Balawegaya to expel Harin Fernando and Manusha Nanayakkara from the party was legally valid. As a consequence of this judgement, their expulsion resulted in the loss of their parliamentary seats and ministerial portfolios.

On 16 August 2024, it was announced that Harin Fernando had been appointed by the President of Sri Lanka, Ranil Wickremesinghe, as the Advisor to the President on Tourism, Land, Sports, and Youth Affairs, with immediate effect.
