= Nirupama Rajapaksa =

Sri Lankan politician (born 1962)

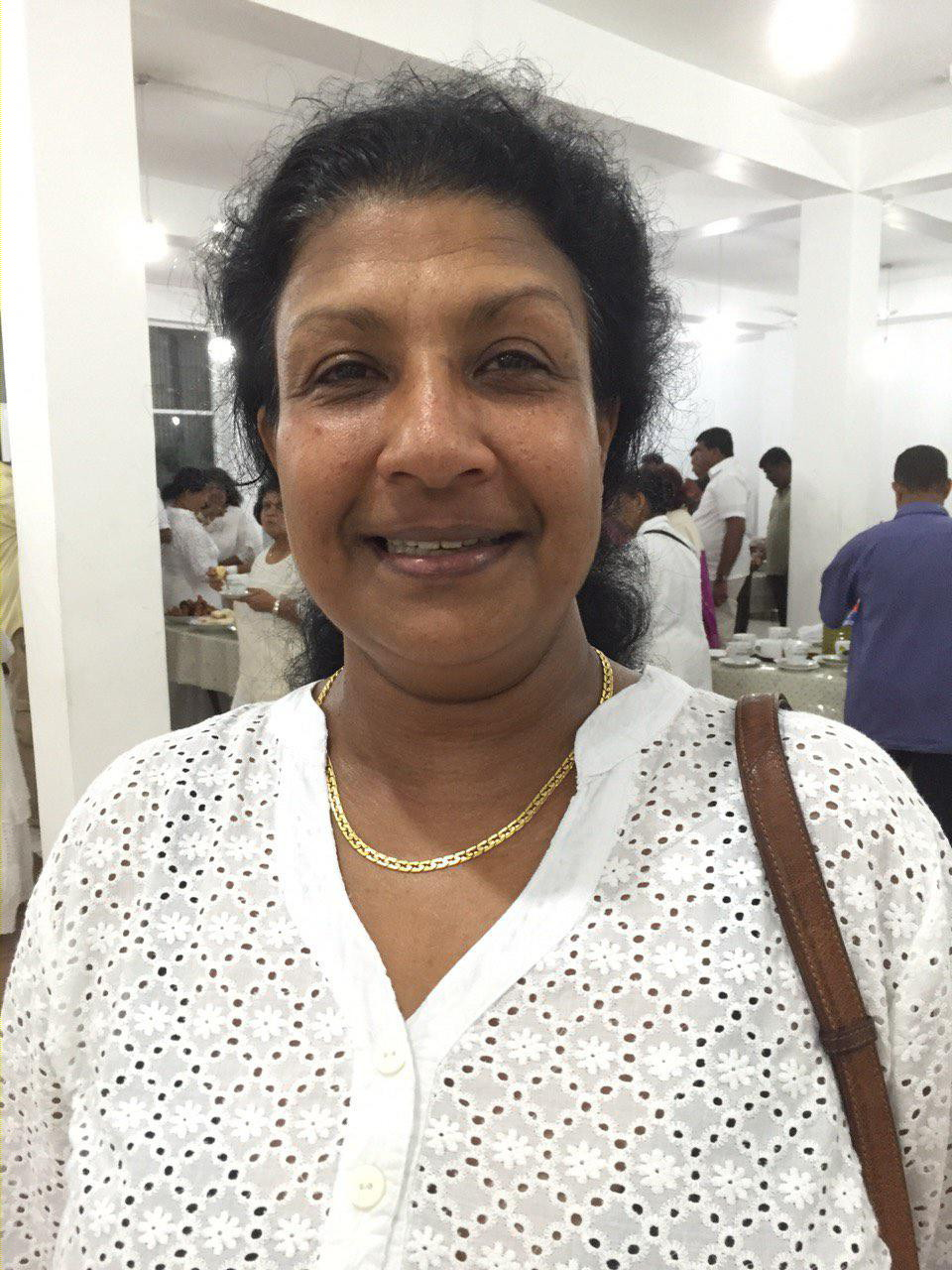

Deputy Minister of Water Supply & Drainage
- In office 2010–2015

Member of Parliament for Hambantota District
- In office 2005–2015
- Preceded by: Mahinda Rajapaksa
- In office 1994–2000

Personal details
- Born: 13 April 1962 (age 63) Dominion of Ceylon
- Party: Sri Lanka Freedom Party
- Other political affiliations: United People's Freedom Alliance
- Spouse: Thirukaran Nadeshan
- Relations: shyamlal Rajapaksa brother,
- Parent(s): George Rajapaksa (deceased) (father); Lalitha Rajapaksa (mother)

Nirupama Deepika Rajapaksa (born 13 April 1962) is a Sri Lankan politician, a former member of the Parliament of Sri Lanka and a former deputy minister.

== Biography ==
Rajapaksa, herself a Sinhalese Buddhist, is married to an ethnic Tamil Hindu, Thirukkumaran Nadesan.

She is the niece of former Sri Lankan President and later Prime Minister Mahinda Rajapaksa. Her late father George and Mahinda were first cousins (her late paternal grandfather, D. M. Rajapaksa and their late father, D. A. Rajapaksa were brothers).

== Career ==
She served as a deputy minister of water supply and drainage during the presidency of Mahinda Rajapaksa between 2010 and 2015.

=== Pandora Papers controversy ===
Her name was mentioned in the Pandora Papers which were leaked to the public in October 2021. Portions of the Papers revealed that she and her husband controlled a shell company they used to make investments and buy luxury apartments in London and Sydney. Nadesan set up other shell companies and trusts in secrecy jurisdictions, and he used them with the intention to obtain lucrative consulting contracts from foreign companies doing business with the Sri Lankan government and to buy artwork. Many reports related the fraudulent efforts as part of Rajapksa family's undisclosed wealth in offshore countries. The International Consortium of Investigative Journalists (ICIJ) reported that Rajapaksa and Nadesan declined to answer its questions about their trusts and companies.

== Departure from Sri Lanka ==
On 5 April during the ongoing 2022 Sri Lankan protests against the Sri Lankan government she left the country to Dubai.

== See also ==
- List of political families in Sri Lanka
- Rajapaksa family
