= Saman Weerasinghe =

Sri Lankan medical doctor, diplomat and businessman (born 1961)

Saman Kumara Ranjith Weerasinghe
- Born: 17 October 1961 (age 64); Tangalle, Sri Lanka
- Education: Mahinda College, Galle; Moscow Medical Academy
- Occupations: Entrepreneur, Sri Lankan Ambassador to Russian Federation
- Title: Order of Honour (Russia)
- Parent(s): Sirisena Weerasinghe, Allen Weerasinghe

Ambassador of Sri Lanka to the Russian Federation
- In office 7 September 2015 – 28 February 2019
- Preceded by: Udayanga Weeratunga
- Succeeded by: Dr. Dayan Jayatilleka

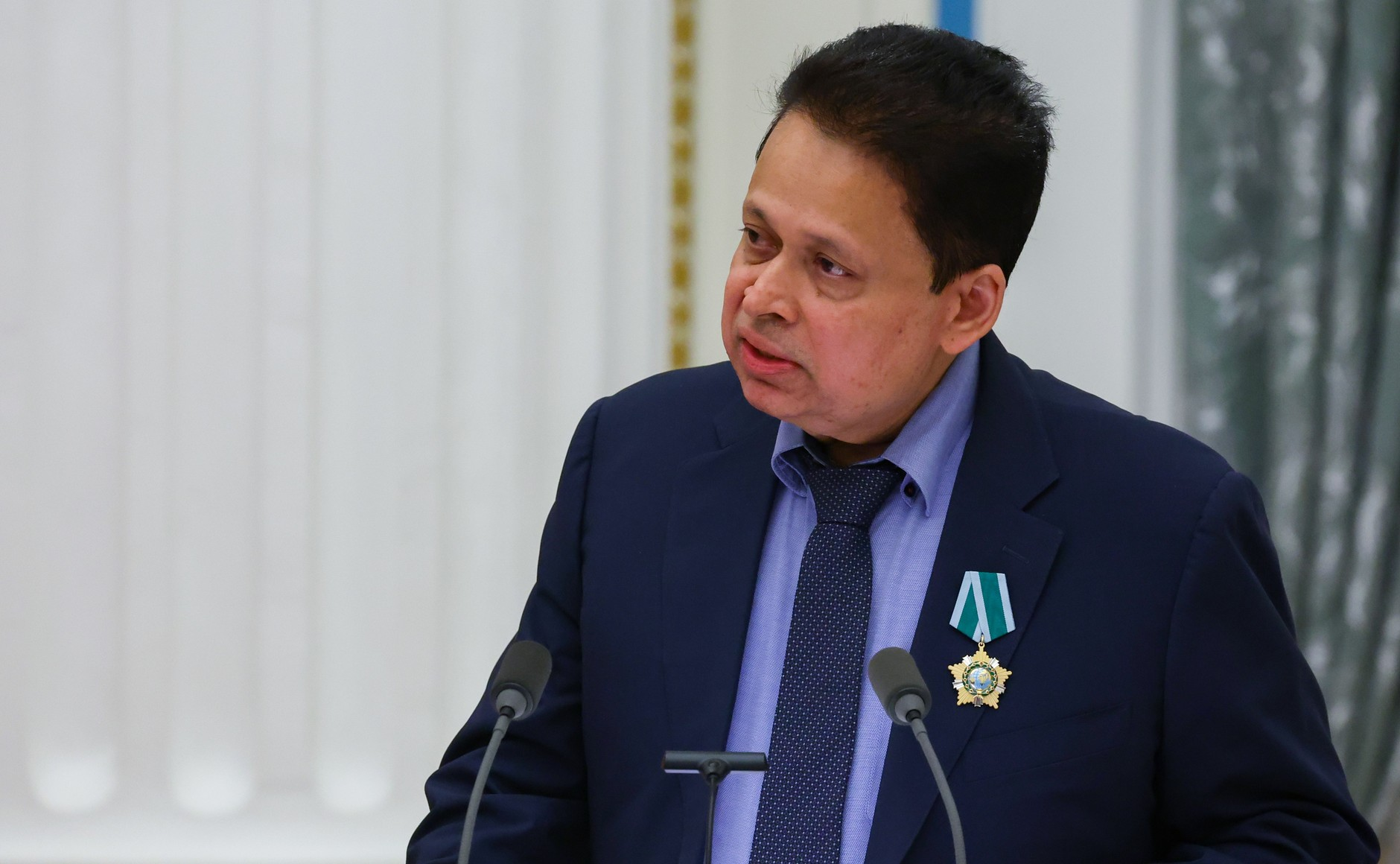
The Order of Friendship was awarded to the Secretary General of the Sri Lanka – Russia Friendship Society, Saman Kumara Ranjith Weerasinghe

Dr. Saman Kumara Ranjith Weerasinghe (born 17 October 1961) is a Sri Lankan medical doctor, diplomat and businessman. He is former Sri Lankan Ambassador to the Russian Federation and a recipient of the Order of Honour (Russia).

Weerasinghe is the chairman of Mos-Lanka Holdings Group. He has also served as the vice president of the Russia – Sri Lanka Friendship Society and as the International Secretary of the Russia – Sri Lanka Friendship Society. He is the president of Dayaka Sabhawa of the Kelaniya Raja Maha Temple

== Early life and education ==
Saman Kumara Ranjith Weerasinghe is the son of Sirisena Weeerasinghe and Allen Weerasinghe of Tangalle in Southern Sri Lanka. He received his initial education at Tangalle College and then joined Mahinda College, Galle to receive his primary and secondary education. Weerasinghe pursued higher studies in Russia after winning a scholarship in 1980s. He graduated with a First Class Honours Degree from the Moscow Medical Academy in Russia. Weerasinghe developed strong connections with Russia during his academic career and became an advocate for stronger Sri Lanka-Russia relationship.

== Career ==
After completing his higher education he served as a consultant, to the international section of the Moscow State Medical Academy. Weerasinghe was responsible for introducing several attractive investment and trade opportunities to Sri Lanka through the Russian business community. He development of economic and cultural relationships between Russia and Sri Lanka.

Weerasinghe was an advisor to former president Mahinda Rajapaksa. In addition, Weerasinghe holds honorary positions, of General Secretary of the Sri Lanka-Russia Friendship Society, and Deputy President of the Russia Friendship Association. In June 2013, Weerasinghe was awarded the Order of Honour (Russia), in recognition of his contribution to develop and strengthen economic, cultural and humanitarian cooperation between Sri Lanka and Russia during the past 30 years.

On 4 November 2025, Weerasinghe was presented with the Order of Friendship by Russian president Vladimir Putin in recognition of his decades-long efforts to strengthen bilateral ties between the two nations.

== See also ==
- List of Sri Lankan non-career diplomats
