= Thilak Rajapaksha =

Sri Lankan politician

Hon. Thilak Rajapaksha MP
- තිලක් රාජපක්ෂ திலக் ராஜபக்ஷ

Member of the Parliament of Sri Lanka
- Incumbent
- Assumed office 2020
- Constituency: Ampara District

Personal details
- Born: Raja Manthreelage Thilak Rajapaksha; 2 May 1971 (age 54)
- Party: Sri Lanka Podujana Peramuna
- Other political affiliations: Sri Lanka People's Freedom Alliance
- Occupation: Physician

Military service
- Allegiance: Sri Lanka
- Branch/service: Sri Lanka Army
- Unit: Sri Lanka Army Medical Corps

Raja Manthreelage Thilak Rajapaksha (born 2 May 1971) is a Sri Lankan physician, army officer, politician and Member of Parliament.

Rajapaksha was born on 2 May 1971. He served in the Sri Lanka Army Medical Corps. He was head of the Ambagahawella Regional Hospital and the Ampara Health Officer's Office and director of Ampara Regional Health Services Office. He is a member of Viyathmaga (Path of the Learned), a pro-Rajapaksa, nationalist group of academics, businesspeople and professionals.

Rajapaksha contested the 2020 parliamentary election as a Sri Lanka People's Freedom Alliance electoral alliance candidate in Ampara District and was elected to the Parliament of Sri Lanka.

Electoral history of Thilak Rajapaksha
Election	Constituency	Party	Alliance	Votes	Result
2020 parliamentary	Ampara District	Sri Lanka Podujana Peramuna	Sri Lanka People's Freedom Alliance	54,203	Elected
