= Prasanna Wickramasuriya =

Lieutenant Colonel Prasanna Wickramasuriya WWV, RWP, RSP
- Born: Matara, Sri Lanka
- Relatives: Mahinda Rajapaksa; Gotabhaya Rajapaksa; Basil Rajapaksa; Chamal Rajapaksa; Jaliya Wickramasuriya
- Military career
- Allegiance: Sri Lanka
- Branch: Sri Lanka Army
- Service years: 1981 - 1998
- Rank: Lieutenant Colonel
- Unit: Gajaba Regiment
- Commands: 1st Gajaba Regiment
- Conflicts: Eelam War I Eelam War II; Eelam War III
- Awards: Weera Wickrama Vibhushanaya; Rana Wickrama Padakkama; Rana Sura Padakkama
- Other work: Chairman, Airport and Aviation Services Limited Sri Lanka

Lieutenant Colonel Prasanna Wickramasuriya, WWV, RWP, RSP is a highly decorated (retired) Sri Lanka Army officer who served as Chairman of Airport and Aviation Services (Sri Lanka) Ltd. As a two-time recipient of the Weera Wickrama Vibhushanaya (WWV), the highest wartime military decoration awarded non-posthumously by Sri Lanka, Wickramasuriya is one of the most highly decorated Sri Lankan military officers.

During Wickramasuriya's tenure as Chairman of Airport and Aviation Services (Sri Lanka) Ltd., he oversaw the construction and development of Mattala Rajapaksa International Airport, Sri Lanka’s second international airport.

== Family and education ==
Wickramasuriya was born in Matara to a family descending from local headmen. He is the younger son of Pema and Kamala Wickramasuriya née Rajapaksa, daughter of D. M. Rajapaksa, and he is a first cousin of Mahinda Rajapaksa, who served as President of Sri Lanka from 2005 to 2015. Jaliya Wickramasuriya is his elder brother, and he was the brother-in-law of Colonel A. F. Lafir. He was educated at Nalanda College, Colombo.

== Military career ==
Having joined the army after completing his schooling as a cadet officer, he underwent officer training at the Sri Lanka Military Academy at Diyatalawa. Completing his training in 1983, he was commissioned as a Second Lieutenant in the Rajarata Rifles. Following the disbanding of the Rajarata Rifles, he was transferred to the newly formed Gajaba Regiment. There he served as special operations platoon commander, platoon commander in operations in Jaffna with the onset of the Tamil Militancy and took part in the Vadamarachchi Operation, when he was shot in the chest and evacuated by air to the Military Hospital in Pallali. In 1994, while serving as the adjutant of the Kotelawala Defence Academy, he was able to detect by chance a LTTE suicide bomber cell in Colombo. In 1997, as a battalion commander of the 1st Gajaba Regiment, he took part in the Operation Jayasikurui and was present at the Thandikulam–Omanthai offensive. He retired from the army in 1998 with the rank of Lieutenant Colonel and during his career, he had been awarded Weera Wickrama Vibhushanaya two times, Rana Wickrama Padakkama, Rana Sura Padakkama and the Desha Putra Sammanaya.

== Later work ==
Following his retirement from the army, Wickramasuirya worked with his brother in exporting tea. He was appointed as Chairman of Airport and Aviation Services Limited by President Mahinda Rajapaksa in 2010.
