= D. A. Rajapaksa =

Sri Lankan politician

- ඩී. ඒ. රාජපක්ෂ டி. ஏ. ராஜபக்ஷ

Minister of Agriculture and Land
- In office 1959–1960

Deputy Speaker of the Parliament of Sri Lanka
- In office 11 February 1964 – 12 November 1964
- Preceded by: Hugh Fernando
- Succeeded by: Shirley Corea

Member of the Ceylon Parliament for Beliatta
- In office 1947–1960
- Preceded by: constituency created
- Succeeded by: D. P. Atapattu
- In office 1960–1965
- Preceded by: D. P. Atapattu
- Succeeded by: D. P. Atapattu

Personal details
- Born: Don Alwin Rajapaksa; 5 November 1905 Medamulana, British Ceylon
- Died: 7 November 1967 (aged 62)
- Party: Sri Lanka Freedom Party
- Other political affiliations: United National Party
- Spouse: Dandina Samarasinghe Dissanayake
- Children: Jayanthi; Chamal; Mahinda; Chandra; Gotabaya; Basil; Dudley; Preethi; Gandani
- Education: Richmond College, Galle
- Occupation: politician

Don Alwin Rajapaksa (Sinhala: දොන් ඇල්වින් රාජපක්ෂ; Tamil: டான் ஆல்வின் ராஜபக்ஷ; 5 November 1905 – 7 November 1967) was a Sri Lankan politician and Member of Parliament who represented the Beliatta electorate in Hambantota district from 1947 to 1965. A founding member of Sri Lanka Freedom Party and Cabinet Minister of Agriculture and Land in Wijeyananda Dahanayake's government, he was the father of two Sri Lankan Presidents; Mahinda and Gotabaya.

== Personal life ==
Don Alwin Rajapaksa was born on 5 November 1905 in a hamlet called Medamulana and had his early education at Mandaduva School in Weeraketiya. His father Don David Rajapaksa, who held the post of Vidane Arachchi in Ihala Valikada Korale, sent him for secondary education to Richmond College, Galle. Having completed his education, he helped his father manage the family estate, which consisted of paddy fields and coconut plantations. He captained the Richmond College cricket team for three years.

He was married to Dandina Samarasinghe Dissanayake Palatuwe Hamine. The couple had nine children: Chamal, Jayanthi, Mahinda, Chandra, Basil, Gotabaya, Dudley, Preethi and Gandani.

At the defeat in the 1965 general elections, Rajapaksa not only lost his political power but was also devoid of material wealth. During this period all his children were studying in Colombo and he found it difficult to meet their expenses. He sold his vehicle, leased his coconut lands and went through enormous hardships to sustain the family. When he fell seriously ill in November 1967, he was unable to find a vehicle in the vicinity to take him to the hospital. When transport was arranged belatedly his heart condition had worsened. After admission to hospital, he died on 7 November 1967.

== Political career ==
=== Early political career ===
Rajapaksa helped his elder brother Don Mathew, who was the State Councillor for Hambantota in attending to affairs of the electorate, gaining experience in politics. D. M. received 17,046 votes in the 1936 State Council election in Hambantota. On his brother's death, Rajapaksa was nevertheless reluctant to contest the Hambantota seat at the by-election of 1945. Nevertheless, the politically influential people in the area insisted that he should contest the by-election and were finally successful in dragging him into active politics. He won the seat at the by-election and was included in the Committee on Agriculture and Land in the State Council. This gave him a good opportunity to tackle the problem of landlessness of the peasantry of Giruvapattuva. Rajapaksa adopted a 99-year lease scheme to transfer crown land to landless peasants in 2.0-hectare (5-acre) plots. For the middle income earners, the land extending from 4.0–20.2 hectares (10–50 acres) was alienated in the same manner. These measures in fact gave a boost to the paddy and coconut cultivations in Giruva Pattuva.

=== Parliamentary general elections ===
==== 1947–1956 ====
When the first parliamentary general elections were held in 1947 under the new Soulbury constitution, the former Hambantota electorate was divided into two, namely Beliatta and Tissamaharama electorate. Most of Western Giruva Pattuva were included in the Beliatta electorate. Rajapaksa contested in Beliatta on the United National Party, obtained 14,007 votes with a majority of 8,022 and won the seat.

When S. W. R. D. Bandaranaike, disgruntled over the policies of the United National Party, left the party to form the Sri Lanka Freedom Party in 1951, Several parliamentarians, including Rajapaksa, Herbert Sri Nissanka and D. S. Goonesekera, followed Bandaranaike when he crossed the floor of the house to the opposition benches on 12 July 1951. The Rajapaksas supported Bandaranaike at the general elections of 1952, winning the Beliatta electorate for the SLFP where he defeated his opponent by a majority of 17,382 votes. Later on, in the historic general elections of 1956, Rajapaksa won the seat from Sri Lanka Freedom Party with 26,215 votes, which was 15,335 votes more than the opposition. Then he was elected member of parliament for Beliatta and appointed as Parliamentary Secretary to the Minister of Lands and Land Development.

===== Deputy Minister of Lands and Land Development =====
As the Deputy Minister, Rajapaksa paid special attention to agriculture and made every effort to bring economic development not only to Ruhuna but also to the people of the more than 16,000 ha (40,000 acres) of citrus plantations in the undeveloped villages of Sri Lanka. Rajapaksa gave his full support to make the Paddy Act a success along with Philip Gunawardena, who was the Minister of Agriculture and Food. On 19 February 1961, he wrote a valuable article in the Silumina newspaper entitled "Katata Rahata Kurakkan" about the symbolism of Rajapaksa's and about the species in Kurakkan and the associated folk poems. In 1959, he was appointed as Cabinet Minister of Agriculture and Lands by Prime Minister Wijeyananda Dahanayake.

==== March 1960–1965 ====
At the general election of 1960, Rajapaksa lost his seat. However, when the UNP government was dissolved and the parliamentary elections were held for the second time in July of the same year, he regained his seat at Beliatta with 15,121 votes out of 35,992 and was backbencher of the government led by Sirimavo Bandaranaike. He was appointed Deputy Chairman of Committees in Parliament and subsequently Deputy Speaker. He lost his seat in the general election of 1965 to his rival, D. P. Atapattu.

== Family ==
Don David Rajapaksa Vidanarachchi

He held the colonial post of Vidane Arachchi in Ihala Valikada Korale, Giruvapattuva in the Hambantota District.

Don Mathew Rajapaksa (1897–1945)

He was the State Councillor for Hambantota District from 1936 to 1945.

Don Alwin Rajapaksa (1905–1967)

He was one of the founding members of the Sri Lanka Freedom Party and was also a Deputy Speaker of Parliament and Cabinet Minister.

=== Family tree ===
1. Don David Rajapaksa Vidanarachchi (feudal post) + Dona Gimara Weerakoon Ratnayake

1.1. Don Mathew Rajapaksa (State Councillor)

1.1.1. Lakshman Rajapaksa (Member of Parliament)
1.1.2. George Rajapaksa (1926–1976) (Member of Parliament, Cabinet Minister of Fisheries and Health)

1.1.2.1. Nirupama Rajapaksa (former Deputy Minister of Water Supply & Drainage and Member of Parliament)

1.2. Don Alwin Rajapaksa (1905–1967) (Member of Parliament, Deputy Minister, Deputy Speaker of Parliament, Cabinet Minister of Agriculture and Land) + Dandina Samarasinghe Dissanayake

1.2.1. Jayanthi Rajapaksa (1940 –) (children: Himal Laleendra Hettiarachchi, Rangani Hettiarachhi)

1.2.2. Chamal Rajapaksa (1942 –) (former Member of Parliament, former Cabinet Deputy Minister, former Full Minister and former Speaker)
(Children: Shashindra Rajapaksa, Shameendra Rajapaksa)

1.2.3. Mahinda Rajapaksa (1945 –) (former Member of Parliament, former Cabinet Minister, former Leader of Opposition, former Prime Minister, former President of Sri Lanka)
(children: Namal Rajapaksa, Yoshitha Rajapaksa, Rohitha Rajapaksa)

1.2.4. Chandra Rajapaksa (1947–2018) (children: Chaminda Rajapaksa)

1.2.5. Gotabhaya Rajapaksa (1949 –) (former President of Sri Lanka – 7th Executive President and former Permanent Secretary to the Ministry of Defence, Public Security, Law and Order)
(children: Manoj Rajapaksa)

1.2.6. Basil Rajapaksa (1951 –) (former Cabinet Minister and former Member of Parliament) (Children: Thejani Rajapaksa, Bimalka Rajapaksa, Ashantha Rajapaksa)

1.2.7. Dudley Rajapaksa (1957 –) (children: Mihiri Rajapaksa)

1.2.8. Preethi Rajapaksa (1959 –) (children: Malaka Chandradasa, Madhawa Chandradasa, Madini Chandradasa, Malika Chandradasa)

1.2.9. Gandani Rajapaksa (1962 –) (children: Eshana Ranawaka, Nipuna Ranawaka, Randula Ranawaka)

== See also ==
- List of political families in Sri Lanka
