= Chamara Sampath Dassanayake =

Sri Lankan politician

Hon. Chamara Sampath Dassanayake MP
- චාමර සම්පත් දසනායක சாமர சம்பத் தசநாயக்க

6th Chief Minister of Uva Province
- In office 15 September 2015 – 9 October 2019
- Preceded by: Harin Fernando

Member of Parliament for Badulla
- Incumbent
- Assumed office 20 August 2020
- In office 1 – 15 September 2015

Personal details
- Born: 31 August 1971 (age 54)
- Party: New Democratic Front (since 2024)
- Other political affiliations: Sri Lanka Podujana Peramuna (2019–2024); United People's Freedom Alliance (until 2019)

Chamara Sampath Dassanayake (born 31 August 1971) is a Sri Lankan politician and member of parliament. He served as Chief Minister of Uva Province from 2015 to 2019.

Dassanayake was first elected to the Uva Provincial Council at the 1994 provincial council elections. He served in a number of positions, including as the Provincial Minister of Sports and Youth Affairs. At the 2015 parliamentary election, Dassanayake was elected to the Parliament of Sri Lanka representing the Badulla District as a member of the United People's Freedom Alliance. However, he would resign from his seat shortly after to take up the role of Uva Chief Minister, after the position was vacated by the incumbent, Harin Fernando, who was also elected to parliament at the election representing Badulla.

In January 2018, Dassanayake stepped down from his position as Provincial Education Minister whilst an investigation by the Human Rights Commission of Sri Lanka was underway. The investigation related to an incident were Dissanyake allegedly demeaned a local school principal. In April 2018, he was controversially re-instated back as the Education Minister by Governor of Uva Province M. P. Jayasinghe.

At the 2020 parliamentary elections, Dassanayake ran again for a seat from the Badulla electorate, representing the Sri Lanka Podujana Peramuna (SLPP). He polled 66,393 votes and was one of six SLPP members to be elected.
