= Mulkirigala Electoral District =

Electoral district of Sri Lanka

Mulkirigala electoral district was an electoral district of Sri Lanka between March 1960 and February 1989. The district was named after the town of Mulkirigala in Hambantota District, Southern Province. The 1978 Constitution of Sri Lanka introduced the proportional representation electoral system for electing members of Parliament. The existing 160 mainly single-member electoral districts were replaced with 22 multi-member electoral districts. Mulkirigala electoral district was replaced by the Hambantota multi-member electoral district at the 1989 general elections.

== Members of Parliament ==
Key

Independent SLFP UNP

| Election | Member | Party | Term |
|---|---|---|---|
| 1960 (March) | George Rajapaksa | | 1960 |
| 1960 (July) | George Rajapaksa | SLFP | 1960-1965 |
| 1965 | George Rajapaksa | SLFP | 1965-1970 |
| 1970 | George Rajapaksa | SLFP | 1970-1976 |
| 1976 by-election | Lakshman Rajapaksa | SLFP | 1976-1977 |
| 1977 | T. D. Fransisku | United National Party | 1977-1989 |

== Elections ==
=== 1960 (March) Parliamentary General Election ===
Results of the 4th parliamentary election held on 19 March 1960:

| Candidate | Party | Symbol | Votes | % |
|---|---|---|---|---|
| George Rajapaksa | | Cartwheel | 13,533 | 50.53 |
| Premaratne Welivitigoda | | Star | 5,355 | 19.99 |
| Chandra Atapattu | | Elephant | 5,001 | 18.67 |
| G. W. Kulatunga | | Cockrel | 896 | 3.35 |
| J. M. M. Bandara | | Radio | 632 | 2.36 |
| Edwin Dahanayaka | | Hand | 514 | 1.92 |
| C. A. Mathew | | Umbrella | 326 | 1.22 |
| D. A. Sirisena Weerasinghe | | Flower | 173 | 0.65 |
| K. L. Don Andrayas | | Sun | 135 | 0.50 |
| Valid Votes | | | 26,565 | 99.19 |
| Rejected Votes | | | 216 | 0.81 |
| Total Polled | | | 26,781 | 100.00 |
| Registered Electors | | | 32,499 | |
| Turnout | | | | 82.41 |

=== 1960 (July) Parliamentary General Election ===
Results of the 5th parliamentary election held on 20 July 1960:

| Candidate | Party | Symbol | Votes | % |
|---|---|---|---|---|
| George Rajapaksa | | Hand | 17,317 | 68.47 |
| Thomaratne Don Pranceesku | | Elephant | 7,826 | 30.95 |
| Valid Votes | | | 25,143 | 99.42 |
| Rejected Votes | | | 147 | 0.58 |
| Total Polled | | | 25,290 | 100.00 |
| Registered Electors | | | 32,499 | |
| Turnout | | | | 77.81 |

=== 1965 Parliamentary General Election ===
Results of the 6th parliamentary election held on 22 March 1965:

| Candidate | Party | Symbol | Votes | % |
|---|---|---|---|---|
| George Rajapaksa | | Hand | 18,245 | 54.39 |
| T. D. Fransisku | | Elephant | 15,085 | 44.97 |
| Valid Votes | | | 33,330 | 99.37 |
| Rejected Votes | | | 213 | 0.63 |
| Total Polled | | | 33,543 | 100.00 |
| Registered Electors | | | 40,050 | |
| Turnout | | | | 83.75 |

=== 1970 Parliamentary General Election ===
Results of the 7th parliamentary election held on 27 May 1970:

| Candidate | Party | Symbol | Votes | % |
|---|---|---|---|---|
| George Rajapaksa | | Hand | 22,569 | 57.29 |
| T. D. Fransisku | | Elephant | 16,643 | 42.24 |
| Valid Votes | | | 39,212 | 99.53 |
| Rejected Votes | | | 185 | 0.47 |
| Total Polled | | | 39,397 | 100.00 |
| Registered Electors | | | 45,870 | |
| Turnout | | | | 85.89 |

=== 1976 Parliamentary By Election ===
Following the death of the sitting member, George Rajapaksa on 18 June 1976 a parliamentary by election was held on 26 August 1976:

| Candidate | Party | Symbol | Votes | % |
|---|---|---|---|---|
| Lakshman Rajapaksa | Sri Lanka Freedom Party | Hand | 27,110 | 52.71 |
| T. D. Fransisku | United National Party | Elephant | 23,109 | 44.93 |
| Neale Rajapaksa | | Chair | 750 | 1.46 |
| Sepala Rajapaksa | | Lamp | 297 | 0.58 |
| Valid Votes | | | 51,266 | 99.68 |
| Rejected Votes | | | 164 | 0.32 |
| Total Polled | | | 51,430 | 100.00 |
| Registered Electors | | | | |
| Turnout | | | | |

=== 1977 Parliamentary General Election ===
Results of the 8th parliamentary election held on 21 July 1977:

| Candidate | Party | Symbol | Votes | % |
|---|---|---|---|---|
| T. D. Fransisku | United National Party | Elephant | 22,638 | 54.75 |
| Basil Rajapaksa | Sri Lanka Freedom Party | Hand | 17,700 | 42.81 |
| Neale Rajapaksa | | Cartwheel | 425 | 1.03 |
| Amara Wellappili | | Key | 297 | 0.72 |
| K. V. A. Kulatunga | | Rabbit | 143 | 0.35 |
| Valid Votes | | | 41,203 | 99.65 |
| Rejected Votes | | | 143 | 0.35 |
| Total Polled | | | 41,346 | 100.00 |
| Registered Electors | | | 46,551 | |
| Turnout | | | | 88.82 |
