= Tissamaharama Electoral District =

Electoral district of Sri Lanka

Tissamaharama electoral district was an electoral district of Sri Lanka between March 1960 and February 1989. The district was named after the town of Tissamaharama in Hambantota District, Southern Province. The 1978 Constitution of Sri Lanka introduced the proportional representation electoral system for electing members of Parliament. The existing 160 mainly single-member electoral districts were replaced with 22 multi-member electoral districts. Tissamaharama electoral district was replaced by the Hambantota multi-member electoral district at the 1989 general elections.

== Members of Parliament ==
Key

Independent SLFP UNP

Election	Member	Party	Term
1960 (March)	Lakshman Rajapaksa	Mahajana Eksath Peramuna	
1960 (July)	Lakshman Rajapaksa	Mahajana Eksath Peramuna	
1965	Charles Edirisuriya	Sri Lanka Freedom Party	
1970	Tennyson Edirisuriya	Sri Lanka Freedom Party	
1977	P. M. B. Cyril	United National Party	

== Elections ==
=== 1960 (March) Parliamentary General Election ===
Results of the 4th parliamentary election held on 19 March 1960:

Candidate	Party	Symbol	Votes	%
Lakshman Rajapaksa	Mahajana Eksath Peramuna	Cartwheel	10,665	44.83
Charles Edirisuriya		Elephant	7,253	30.23
Piyadasa Weeraratne		Pair of Scales	2,108	8.79
R. G. W. Nilaweera		Hand	1,660	6.92
Danister Serasinghe		Sun	1,057	4.41
Albert Ediriwickremasuriya		Umbrella	754	3.14
E. G. Wijesinghe		Eye	291	1.21
Valid Votes			23,788	99.15
Rejected Votes			204	0.85
Total Polled			23,992	100.00
Registered Electors			32,024	
Turnout				74.92

=== 1960 (July) Parliamentary General Election ===
Results of the 5th parliamentary election held on 20 July 1960:

Candidate	Party	Symbol	Votes	%
Lakshman Rajapaksa		Cartwheel	12,551	54.32
Charles Edirisuriya		Elephant	10,426	45.12
Valid Votes			22,977	99.44
Rejected Votes			130	0.56
Total Polled			23,107	100.00
Registered Electors			32,024	
Turnout				72.16

=== 1965 Parliamentary General Election ===
Results of the 6th parliamentary election held on 22 March 1965:

Candidate	Party	Symbol	Votes	%
Charles Edirisuriya	Sri Lanka Freedom Party	Hand	14,295	45.60
Lakshman Rajapaksa	Independent	Cartwheel	14,059	44.85
Ubewarna Nimal Rohana		Flower	2,719	8.67
Valid Votes			31,073	99.12
Rejected Votes			276	0.88
Total Polled			31,349	100.00
Registered Electors			40,724	
Turnout				76.98

=== 1970 Parliamentary General Election ===
Results of the 7th parliamentary election held on 27 May 1970:

Candidate	Party	Symbol	Votes	%
Tennyson Edirisuriya	Sri Lanka Freedom Party	Hand	18,576	43.25
Lakshman Rajapaksa	Independent	Umbrella	13,121	30.55
Charles Edirisuriya	United National Party	Elephant	5,919	13.78
Thassim Mohamed Riyal		Chair	2,733	6.36
Weerasin Gunasekera Edmund		Butterfly	2,269	5.28
Ubewarna Nimal Rohana		Bell	169	0.39
Valid Votes			42,787	99.61
Rejected Votes			167	0.39
Total Polled			42,954	100.00
Registered Electors			51,500	
Turnout				83.41

=== 1977 Parliamentary General Election ===
Results of the 8th parliamentary election held on 21 July 1977:

Candidate	Party	Symbol	Votes	%
P. M. B. Cyril	United National Party	Elephant	20,879	53.00
Lakshman Rajapaksa	Sri Lanka Freedom Party	Hand	13,109	33.28
Tennyson Edirisuriya		Star	5,206	13.22
Valid Votes			39,354	99.99
Rejected Votes			160	0.01
Total Polled			39,394	100.00
Registered Electors			45,888	
Turnout				85.85
