= Hambantota Electoral District (1947–1960) =

Electoral district of Sri Lanka

Hambantota electoral district was an electoral district of Sri Lanka between August 1947 and March 1960. The district was named after the city of Hambantota in Hambantota District, Southern Province. The 1978 Constitution of Sri Lanka introduced the proportional representation electoral system for electing members of Parliament. The existing 160 mainly single-member electoral districts were replaced with 22 multi-member electoral districts. Hambantota electoral district was replaced by the Hambantota multi-member electoral district at the 1989 general elections, the first under the PR system, though Hambantota continues to be a polling division of the multi-member electoral district.

== Members of Parliament ==
Key

Independent SLFP UNP

Election	Member	Party	Term
1947	Lakshman Rajapaksa	Communist Party of Ceylon	1947-1952
1952	Charles Edirisuriya		1952-1956
1956	Lakshman Rajapaksa		1956-1960

== Elections ==
=== 1947 Parliamentary General Election ===
Results of the 1st parliamentary election held between 23 August 1947 and 20 September 1947 for the district:

Candidate	Party	Symbol	Votes	%
Lakshman Rajapaksa	Communist Party of Ceylon	Star	8,740	46.80
Charles Edirisuriya		Hand	8,340	44.66
G. K. W. Perera		Cartwheel	1,301	6.97
Valid Votes			18,381	98.42
Rejected Votes			295	1.58
Total Polled			18,676	100.00
Registered Electors			31,841	
Turnout				58.65

=== 1952 Parliamentary General Election ===
Results of the 2nd parliamentary election held between 24 May 1952 and 30 May 1952 for the district:

Candidate	Party	Symbol	Votes	%
Charles Edirisuriya		Key	14,494	55.76
Lakshman Rajapaksa		Umbrella	10,658	40.27
Jayadasa Pathiratne		Star	418	1.58
Jayadeva Amarasinghe		Elephant	367	1.39
P. H. Mendis De Silva		Hand	199	0.75
Valid Votes			26,136	98.75
Rejected Votes			330	1.24
Total Polled			26,466	100.00
Registered Electors			37,079	
Turnout				71.38

=== 1956 Parliamentary General Election ===
Results of the 3rd parliamentary election held between 5 April 1956 and 10 April 1956 for the district:

Candidate	Party	Symbol	Votes	%
Lakshman Rajapaksa		Hand	20,931	68.57
Charles Edirisuriya		Elephant	9,377	30.72
Valid Votes			30,308	99.30
Rejected Votes			215	0.70
Total Polled			30,523	100.00
Registered Electors			44,124	
Turnout				69.18
