= Lakshman Rajapaksa =

Sri Lankan politician

Hon. Lakshman Rajapaksa

Member of the Ceylon Parliament for Hambantota
- In office 20 September 1947 – 30 May 1952
- Preceded by: constituency established
- Succeeded by: Charles Edirisuriya
- In office 10 April 1956 – 19 March 1960
- Preceded by: Charles Edirisuriya
- Succeeded by: constituency abolished

Member of Parliament for Tissamaharama
- In office March 1960 – 1965
- Preceded by: constituency established
- Succeeded by: Charles Edirisuriya

Member of Parliament for Mulkirigala
- In office September 1976 – June 1977
- Preceded by: George Rajapaksa
- Succeeded by: T. D. Fransisku

Personal details
- Born: 24 July 1924
- Died: 18 June 1981 (aged 56)
- Party: Communist Party of Ceylon, Mahajana Eksath Peramuna, Independent, Sri Lanka Freedom Party
- Relations: D. M. Rajapaksa (father); George Rajapaksa (brother)
- Education: Wesley College, Colombo
- Occupation: Politics

Lakshman Rajapaksa (24 July 1924 – 1981) was a Sri Lankan politician.

Rajapaska contested Hambantota electorate in 1947 General Elections, representing the Communist Party of Ceylon. He was successful defeating his rival, Charles Edirisuriya, by a mere 400 votes, becoming the youngest MP in the first Parliament. Although he was defeated by Edirisuriya at the subsequent 1952 General Elections by almost 4,000 votes. Rajapaska won the 1956 General Elections defeating Edirisuriya by 11,554 votes and was appointed as a Parliamentary secretary to the Minister of Commerce and Trade.

At the March 1960 General Elections he successfully ran in the newly created Tissamaharama electorate as the Mahajana Eksath Peramuna candidate. He won in the subsequent July 1960 General Elections and helped to topple Sirimavo Bandaranaike’s government by voting with the opposition's motion of no confidence in December 1964. At the 1965 General Elections Rajapaska contested as an independent in the seat of Tissamaharama narrowly losing to his long-term rival, Edirisuriya, by 236 votes. He contested the seat again as an independent at the 1970 General Elections where he was defeated by the SLFP candidate, Tennyson Edirisuriya.

Following the death of his younger brother George Rajapaksa, Minister of Health and Fisheries on 18 June 1976 he was selected as the SLFP candidate for the 1976 Mulkirigala by election. He was successful defeating the UNP candidate, T. D. Fransisku, by 4,000 votes.

He then ran as the SLFP candidate in Tissamaharama electorate at the 1977 General Elections, losing by 7,770 votes to the UNP candidate, P. M. B. Cyril.

== Personal life ==
He was the eldest son of D. M. Rajapaksa, who was a member of State Council of Ceylon and the Senate of Ceylon.
