= Nipuna Ranawaka =

Sri Lankan businessman, politician and Member of Parliament

Hon. Nipuna Ranawaka MP
- නිපුණ රණවක நிபுனா ரணவக்க

Member of the Parliament of Sri Lanka
- In office 20 August 2020 – 24 September 2024
- Constituency: Matara District

Personal details
- Born: 1 November 1990 (age 35)
- Party: Sri Lanka Podujana Peramuna
- Other political affiliations: Sri Lanka People's Freedom Alliance

Nipuna Ranawaka (born 1 November 1990) is a Sri Lankan businessman, politician and Member of Parliament.

Ranawaka was born on 1 November 1990. He is a nephew of former Presidents Gotabaya Rajapaksa and Mahinda Rajapaksa. He was educated at Royal College, Colombo and has degree in business management. He owns several businesses in the tourism sector. He is a member of Nilwala Neluma Foundation.

Ranawaka contested the 2020 parliamentary election as a Sri Lanka People's Freedom Alliance electoral alliance candidate in the Matara District and was elected to the Parliament of Sri Lanka.

Electoral history of Nipuna Ranawaka
Election	Constituency	Party	Alliance	Votes	Result
2020 parliamentary	Matara District	Sri Lanka Podujana Peramuna	Sri Lanka People's Freedom Alliance	131,010	Elected
2024 parliamentary	Matara District	Sri Lanka Podujana Peramuna	Sri Lanka Podujana Peramuna		Not elected
