= Shasheendra Rajapaksa =

Sri Lankan politician

Shasheendra Kumara Rajapaksa
- ශෂීන්ද්‍ර රාජපක්ෂ

Member of Parliament for Monaragala District
- In office 20 August 2020 – 24 September 2024
- Majority: 104,729 Preferential Votes

6th Chief Minister of Uva
- In office 20 August 2009 – 13 January 2015
- Preceded by: Gamini Vijith Vijithamuni Soysa
- Succeeded by: Harin Fernando

Personal details
- Born: 28 June 1976 (age 49) Sri Lanka
- Citizenship: Sri Lanka
- Party: Sri Lanka Podujana Peramuna
- Spouse: Lekshika Naomi Rajapaksa
- Children: Tavissh Rajapaksa, Mitheash Rajapaksa
- Parent: Chamal Rajapaksa (father)
- Relatives: Mahinda Rajapaksa (uncle); Gotabaya Rajapaksa (uncle)
- Education: Mahanama College, Colombo; S. Thomas' College, Mount Lavinia
- Occupation: Member of parliament
- Profession: Politician
- Website: shasheendra.lk

Shasheendra Kumara Rajapaksa (known as Shasheendra Rajapaksa) is a Sri Lankan politician. He is a Member of Sri Lankan Parliament for Monaragala District and former State Minister of Paddy and Cereals, Organic Food, Vegetables, Fruits, Chilies, Onions and Potatoes, Seed Production and High Tech Agriculture.

He was a Provincial Councillor of Uva Province who was Chief Minister of Uva Province in Sri Lanka from 2009 to 2015, and former Basnayake Nilame (Lay Custodian) of the Ruhunu Maha Kataragama devalaya. He is the eldest son of Chamal Rajapaksa and nephew of former Presidents Mahinda Rajapaksa and Gotabaya Rajapaksa. Rajapaksa lost his position as Chief Minister of Uva Province to UNP leader Badulla Harin Fernando in 2015, when 6 UPFA members joined Fernando.

== See also ==
- List of political families in Sri Lanka
- List of St. Thomas' College alumni
