= Chamal Rajapaksa =

Sri Lankan politician (born 1942)

- චමල් රාජපක්ෂ சமல் ராஜபக்ஷ
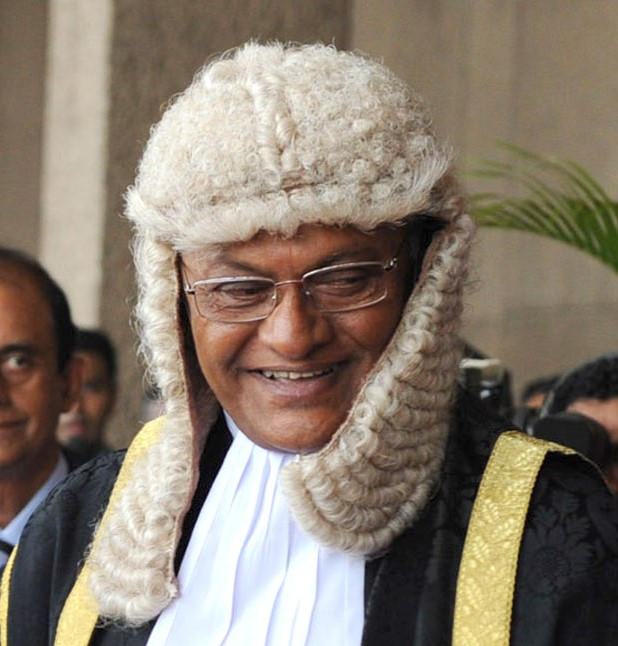
- Rajapaksa in March 2015

19th Speaker of the Parliament
- In office 22 April 2010 – 26 June 2015
- Preceded by: W. J. M. Lokubandara
- Succeeded by: Karu Jayasuriya

Minister of Irrigation
- In office 12 August 2020 – 3 April 2022
- President: Gotabaya Rajapaksa
- Prime Minister: Mahinda Rajapaksa
- In office 28 January 2007 – 23 April 2010
- President: Mahinda Rajapaksa
- Prime Minister: Ratnasiri Wickremanayake

Minister of Internal Trade, Food Security and Consumer Welfare, Mahaweli, Agriculture, Irrigation and Rural Development
- In office 22 November 2019 – 12 August 2020
- President: Gotabaya Rajapaksa
- Prime Minister: Mahinda Rajapaksa

Member of Parliament for Hambantota District
- In office 1989–2024

Personal details
- Born: 30 October 1942 (age 84) Palatuwa, British Ceylon
- Party: Sri Lanka Podujana Peramuna (since 2018)
- Other political affiliations: Sri Lanka Freedom Party (before 2018)
- Spouse: Chandra Malini Rajapaksa (died 2026)
- Children: Shasheendra, Shameendra
- Education: Richmond College, Galle
- Profession: Police officer, Politician

Chamal Jayantha Rajapaksa (Sinhala: චමල් රාජපක්ෂ; Tamil: சமல் ராஜபக்ஷ; born 30 October 1942) is a Sri Lankan politician who was Speaker of the Parliament of Sri Lanka from 2010 to 2015. Previously he served as minister of ports and aviation and the minister for irrigation and water management.

He hails from a well-known political family in Sri Lanka. His father, D. A. Rajapaksa, was a prominent politician, independence agitator, member of parliament and Minister of Agriculture and Land in Wijeyananda Dahanayake's government. He is the elder brother of Mahinda Rajapaksa, who was President of Sri Lanka from 2005 to 2015 and Gotabaya Rajapaksa who was president from 2019 to 2022.

Shashindra Rajapaksa (eldest son of Rajapaksa) is the former chief Minister of Uva Provincial Council and former Basnayaka Nilame (Lay Custodian) of the Ruhunu Maha Kataragama devalaya.

== Early life and education ==
Rajapaksa was born on 30 October 1942 in Palatuwa in the Southern District of Matara and raised in Medamulana in the District of Hambantota. He was the eldest son, of nine siblings which included, an older sister, three younger brothers: Mahinda Rajapaksa, Gotabaya Rajapaksa and Basil Rajapaksa and two younger sisters, to D. A. Rajapaksa and Dona Dandina Samarasinghe Dissanayake. He received his primary and secondary education at Richmond College, Galle. As a student, he was an athlete and played soccer for the school, in addition to being an academic high achiever.

== Early career ==
Following his schooling, he joined the Ceylon Police Force as a Sub-inspector and served for eight years. He thereafter served the State Trading General Corporation as the assistant general manager before getting into active politics in 1985.

== Personal life ==
Chandra Malini Rajapaksa, the wife of Rajapaksa, died at the age of 75 on 15 November 2026 at the Galle National Hospital.

== Political career ==
Contested the by-election held in 1985 for Mulkirigala Electorate.

Entered Parliament in 1989 as a member of parliament of the Sri Lanka Freedom Party representing Hambantota District. Has been a member of parliament continuously since 1989, retaining his seat in all elections held to date.

Prior to his present appointment as Speaker of the Parliament, he held the following portfolios.

- Deputy Minister of Agriculture and Lands
- Deputy Minister of Ports and Southern Development
- Deputy Minister of Plantation Industries
- Minister of Agricultural Development
- Minister of Irrigation and Water Management
- Minister of Ports and Aviation

== Honorary titles ==
- "Sri Lanka Janaseva Vibhushana"

== Other positions held ==
- President, Sri Lanka – Russia Parliamentary Friendship Association
- President, Sri Lanka – Hungary Parliamentary Friendship Association
- Chairman, District Development Committee, Hambantota (District Secretariat)
- Chairman, Hambantota Development Foundation

== See also ==
- List of political families in Sri Lanka
- Speaker of the Parliament of Sri Lanka

Political offices
Preceded by W. J. M. Lokubandara	Speaker of the Parliament; 2010–2015	Succeeded by Karu Jayasuriya
