= Vidane Arachchi =

Vidane Arachchi was an influential post (ranked above an Vidane but below a Muhandiram) in the native headmen system in Ceylon (Sri Lanka) during the colonial era. Appointed by the Government Agent, the holder had much control over the people of the area and wielded quasi-judicial powers since he was responsible to keep the peace, carry out revenue collection, and assist in judicial functions.

Appointments were non-transferable and usually hereditary, made to locals, usually from wealthy influential families loyal to the British Crown.
