= Basil Rajapaksa =

Sri Lankan politician (born 1951)

- බැසිල් රාජපක්ෂ பசில் ராஜபக்ஷ
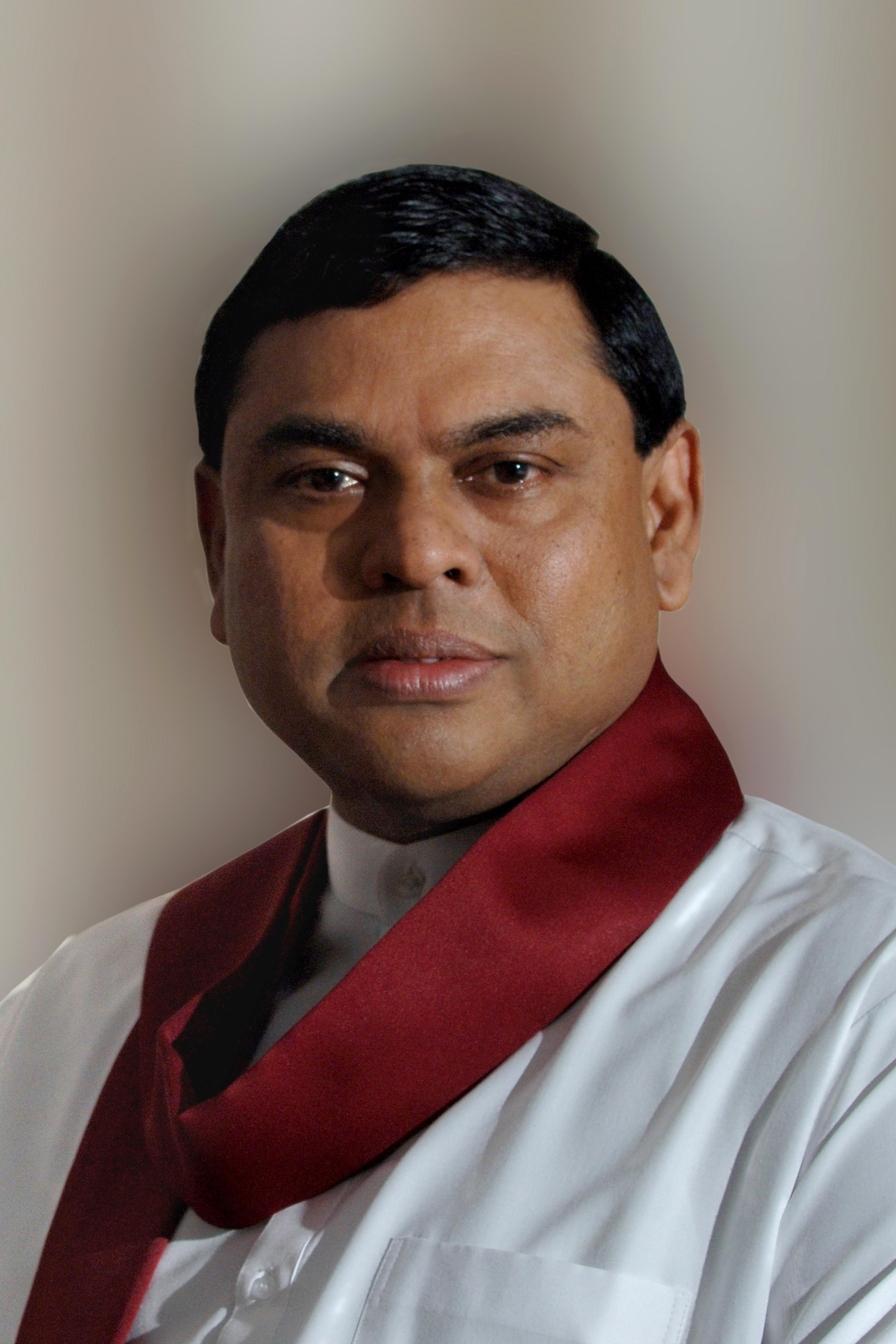

Minister of Finance
- In office 8 July 2021 – 3 April 2022
- President: Gotabaya Rajapaksa
- Prime Minister: Mahinda Rajapaksa
- Preceded by: Mahinda Rajapaksa
- Succeeded by: Ali Sabry

Minister of Economic Development
- In office 22 April 2010 – 9 January 2015
- President: Mahinda Rajapaksa
- Prime Minister: D. M. Jayaratne
- Preceded by: Office Established
- Succeeded by: Ranil Wickremesinghe

Member of Parliament for Gampaha District
- In office 22 April 2010 – 26 June 2015
- Majority: 425,861 Preferential Votes

Member of Parliament for National List
- In office 8 July 2021 – 9 June 2022
- Preceded by: Jayantha Ketagoda
- Succeeded by: Dhammika Perera
- In office 19 September 2007 – 9 February 2010
- Preceded by: Mohamed Ismail Anwar Ismail

Personal details
- Born: 27 April 1951 (age 75) Dominion of Ceylon
- Citizenship: Sri Lankan; American
- Party: Sri Lanka Podujana Peramuna
- Spouse: Pushpa Rajapaksa
- Children: Tejani, Bimalka and Ashantha
- Education: Isipathana College; Ananda College
- Website: basilrajapaksa.com

Basil Rajapaksa (born 27 April 1951) is a Sri Lankan politician. He is a former Minister of Finance and Member of Parliament for the national list.

He was also a member of the Sri Lankan Parliament from 2007 to 2015. During the period of 2005–2010 he served as a presidential senior advisor for President Mahinda Rajapaksa and in 2007 he was appointed as a member of parliament from the national list. He was the Cabinet minister for Economic Development in President Mahinda Rajapaksa's second term (2010–2015). In the 2010 parliamentary election, he was elected from Gampaha district by receiving the highest number of preferential votes in Sri Lanka. He entered the parliament again from the national list and was appointed the Finance Minister during which he was accused of extreme negligence and mismanagement resulting in the worsening of the Sri Lankan economic crisis and was ultimately forced to resign under increasing protests by general public in the 2022 Sri Lankan political crisis. He resigned his seat in parliament on 9 June 2022.

== Family ==
He hails from a well-known political family in the southern part of Sri Lanka. His father, D. A. Rajapaksa, was a prominent politician, independence agitator, Member of Parliament and Cabinet Minister of Agriculture and Land in Wijeyananda Dahanayake's government. He is a younger brother of the former presidents Mahinda Rajapaksa and Gotabaya Rajapaksa, who was the secretary for the defence ministry in the Mahinda Rajapaksa's government. Furthermore, his older brother Chamal served as the Speaker of the Parliament of Sri Lanka (2010–2015).

He had his secondary education at Isipathana College and Ananda College, both located in Colombo.

== Political career ==
At the 1977 General Elections, he contested Mulkirigala Electorate from the Sri Lanka Freedom Party but was defeated. He was the youngest SLFP candidate that contested in this election. In the 1977 election, only 8 members managed to win from the SLFP. Basil Rajapaksa later worked with the first executive President J.R. Jayewardene and joined the United National Party, He made this decision to join the UNP due to some infighting within the Sri Lanka Freedom Party. Although he was with JR Jayawardana, he openly supported his brother Mahinda Rajapaksa. While he was in UNP he became very close to the minister Gamini Dissanayake. When SLFP and coalition parties won the 1994 he actively assisted Minister Mahinda Rajapaksa. In 1997 his wife won the US green card lottery and migrated to the USA with his family. He frequently visited Sri Lanka, especially whenever there were elections.

During the 2005 Presidential election campaign, he actively worked for his brother Mahinda Rajapaksa's victory and became an advisor for the President. In 2007 he was appointed as a national list member for the Sri Lankan parliament. When the 2010 parliamentary election was announced Basil contested the Gampaha district. As the district leader, he gained over 400,000 votes and became a member of the Parliament who obtained the highest number of preferential votes from the district.

In 2021 Basil Rajapaksa returned to the parliament from the national list and was appointed Finance Minister. During his time as minister Sri Lanka had entered an economic crisis but Rajapaksa began avoiding parliament sessions for months. The Opposition complained that pressing economic matters could not be discussed due to his absence. Other government MPs were also critical of his behaviour with Udaya Gammanpila, the energy minister claiming that Basil Rajapaksa refused to accept that an economic crisis was growing and that he knew nothing about his subject.

Rajapakasa finally attended parliament on 5 April after an absence of four months and after being forced to resign after a series of protests against the government.

In 2022, following the nationwide protests, Sri Lanka's ruling Rajapakasa family attempted to flee the country. On 11 July, Rajapakasa's attempt to leave through the VIP terminal at Colombo International Airport failed after a standoff with airport immigration staff, who refused to board him.

He would later successfully leave the country to the United States. On 22 November he returned to Sri Lanka and despite not being an MP or holding any government position he was allowed to use the VIP lounge of Colombo Airport and was given a police escort. In addition he used the Gold Route Service at the BIA which costs over US$200 per person when the VIP service is used and over a hundred SLPP members were seen eating food from the lounge waiting for Basil Rajapaksa to arrive.

== Personal life ==
He is married to Pushpa Rajapaksa and has three children.

== Corruption allegations ==
Rajapaksa is accused of many corruption scandals, and he is under investigation for corruption and abuse of state assets. He gained a reputation as "Mr. Ten Percent" due to the allegations of taking commissions from government contracts. In 2016, the court ordered authorities to auction a luxury villa and 6.5 ha (16 acres) of land in Malwana, which is allegedly owned by Rajapaksa. The house and land have not been auctioned and a court case is still ongoing in respect to this allegation.

One of the accusations that the current government made was the misappropriation of funds belonging to the Divi Neguma Development Department. Financial Crimes Investigation Department (FCID), a police division that was established to punish the supporters of the previous government, filed charges against Rajapaksa. There are several court cases where some citizens of Sri Lanka have challenged the legality of the FCID.

S. B. Dissanayake, the Minister for Social Empowerment and Welfare has stated: "The pipes were purchased according to due tender process, the purchased pipes were duly delivered the pradeshiya sabhas. The pradeshiya sabhas need pipes – for temple functions, funerals, when a minister is visiting – they need pipes for all of this." He has misused funds in a construction project while he was the Minister of Economic Development under his brother's government.

On 14 November 2023, following a case filed by filed by Transparency International Sri Lanka (TISL) and other four activists, the Supreme Court of Sri Lanka found Rajapaksa, his brothers Mahinda and Gotabaya and several other officials guilty of economic mismanagement between 2019 and 2022, and ordered them to pay about $450 (150,000 rupees) in legal costs to the petitioners.

== See also ==
- List of political families in Sri Lanka
