= Thurstan College =

Thurstan College Colombo

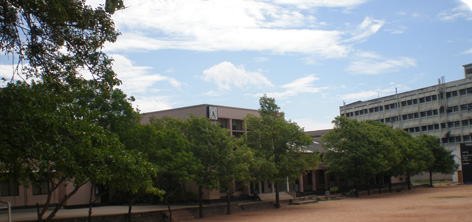
- The College

Location
- Colombo; Sri Lanka; 6°54′13″N 79°51′36″E

Information
- Type: National school
- Motto: Thamasō Mā Jyothirgamaya (Pali) (English: Lead me from Darkness to Light)
- Established: 11 January 1950; 76 years ago
- Founder: E. A. Nugawela
- Principal: Pramuditha Wickramasinghe
- Staff: 650
- Grades: 1 – 13
- Gender: Male
- Age: 5 to 19
- Enrollment: 7500+
- Colours: Blue, gold and red
- Alumni: Old Thurstanites
- Website: thurstancollege.com

Thurstan College (Sinhala: තර්ස්ටන් විද්‍යාලය) is a national school for boys in Colombo, Western Province, Sri Lanka, providing primary and secondary education. It is located in the Cinnamon Gardens neighbourhood of Colombo 7 near the University of Colombo and the Royal College Colombo. The college is regulated by the central government.

Thurstan College has an enrollment of 3,500+ students. It prepares students for examinations conducted by the Ministry of Education. Its facilities include science and computer laboratories and a library. The school has more than 30 clubs and societies. It is easily recognised by the sacred Nuga tree in the grounds. The college colours are blue, gold and red. The college motto is "lead me from darkness to light".

== History ==
=== Previous schools ===
In 1859, A. J. Thurstan, an Anglican missionary and priest, founded a private technical-school that taught agricultural and craft skills. Thurstan funded the school, but it closed after a few years. In 1884, with the assistance of the British government, an agricultural school to promote the cinnamon industry was founded in the same location. The principal was H. W. Green, the director of education. This second school closed in 1910. Cinnamon was cultivated at the school and so the area, Colombo 7, became known as Cinnamon Gardens.

=== Founding ===
On 11 January 1950 a new school, called the Government Senior School, was opened at Kumaratunga Munidasa Mawatha (Thurstan Road) by E. A. Nugawela, minister for education. It was situated between the Royal College Colombo and the University of Colombo on a site vacated by a teachers' training college. The school was intended to accommodate students from the Royal Preparatory School who were unable to gain admission to the Royal College Colombo.

The first principal of the new school was D. E. A. Schokman, who had previously taught at Kingswood College, Kandy. He introduced a house system for sports, prefects (student leadership), cadets, Scouts and literary associations. The first sports day was held under the patronage of H. W. Howes, director of education, on 9 February 1952.

In the early 1950s the lower kindergarten and primary classes were gradually abolished in order to begin a high school and prepare students for matriculation. Around this time, the Indian rationalist, Abraham Kovoor (1898–1978) joined the faculty as a biology teacher. He retired in 1959 and asked that, following his death, his remains be donated to the school to provide a skeleton for anatomical study.

On 26 March 1953, at a ceremony attended by T. D. Jayasuriya, deputy minister for education, the Government Senior School was renamed Thurstan College after the founder of the first school.

=== Expansions and traditions ===
From January 1956 to December 1966, M. D. Gunawardane was the principal at Thurstan College. He revitalised the parent-teacher association and oversaw expansions including a shrine room (later demolished), a two-story science block, a hall and an office complex. Due to civil unrest, Tamil students were removed to nearby Isipathana College. The language of instruction at the school was then changed to Sinhala.

P. M. Jayatillake served as principal from 1967 to 1969. He founded the school's Old Boys Union and started a school magazine and an orchestra.

Siri Pandithasekara was principal from March 1970 to 1974. He organised the school's first kala ullela (English: cultural show) and established the teaching of commerce. Pandithasekara left the college when he was promoted to director of education.

=== Modernisation ===
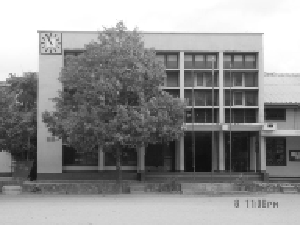
Thurstan College main building

Thurstan College celebrated its silver jubilee in 1975. Under Principal P. S. Gunasekara (1978–1987) primary classes were reintroduced to the college and an English-language curriculum was developed. Engagement with alumni increased and an annual Old Boys Union dinner was revived in 1986. The science block was expanded with a third floor of eleven classrooms.

H. D. Herman Perera became principal in January 1988, and kept the school open through a period of student unrest. Perera used philanthropic donations and grants to build a science block, a computer laboratory, and a sports ground with a scoreboard and giant clock.

Deputy Principal R. D. M. P. Weerathunga assumed duties of principal in late 1992. Using philanthropic funds, he built the Kumar Dewapura block, a three-storey library and a 25-metre (82 ft) swimming pool. In 2000, the college celebrated its golden jubilee. With funds from the department of education, Weerathunga enlarged the school to accommodate another 1,000 students. He also encouraged bands and orchestras at the school.

In 1997 Thurstan College was granted the title for a rugby ground at Bauddhaloka Mawatha. In 2005 this pitch was redeveloped for cricket.

=== 21st century ===
Wimal Gunaratna was appointed principal in August 2008 from his role as Director of Education in the Western Province. He oversaw construction of the Deshabandu Kumar Dewapura Pavilion. In December 2009 work began on new rugby grounds. The diamond jubilee of the college was celebrated with a රු.10 stamp depicting the college building and its Nuga tree.

== Houses ==
Principal Schokman named the houses after the four directors of education during British rule:

- Denham House (Sinhala: ඩෙනම්)
  Deep blue – light blue
- MacRae House (Sinhala: මැක්රේ)
  Deep blue – deep yellow
- Robison House (Sinhala: රොබිසන්)
  Deep blue – deep red
- Sandeman House (Sinhala: සැන්ඩිමන්)
  Deep red – deep yellow

== Principals ==
- D. E. A. Schokman (11 January 1950 – 31 December 1955)
- M. D. Gunawardhana (1 January 1956 – 17 January 1967)
- P. M. Jayatilaka (1 February 1967 – 9 October 1969)
- S. Pandithasekera (16 March 1970 – 30 April 1974)
- A. K. Waidyasekara (2 May 1974 – 20 January 1978)
- P. S. Gunasekhara (24 January 1978 – 31 December 1987)
- H. D. Herman Perera (1 January 1988 – 20 October 1992)
- R. D. M. P. Weerathunga (1992 – 28 August 2006)
- R. M. Jayasekara (acting principal, 2006 – 2008)
- W. Gunarathna (2008 – 2010)
- A. D. M. D. Bandara (2010)
- Y. A. N. D. Yapa (23 September 2010 – 20 May 2013)
- A. D. M. D. Bandara (21 May 2013 – 14 April 2015)
- G. A. M. S. Sarachchandra (acting principal, 1 May 2015 – 31 December 2015)
- E. M. S. Ekanayake (5 February 2016 - 2017)

== Notable alumni ==
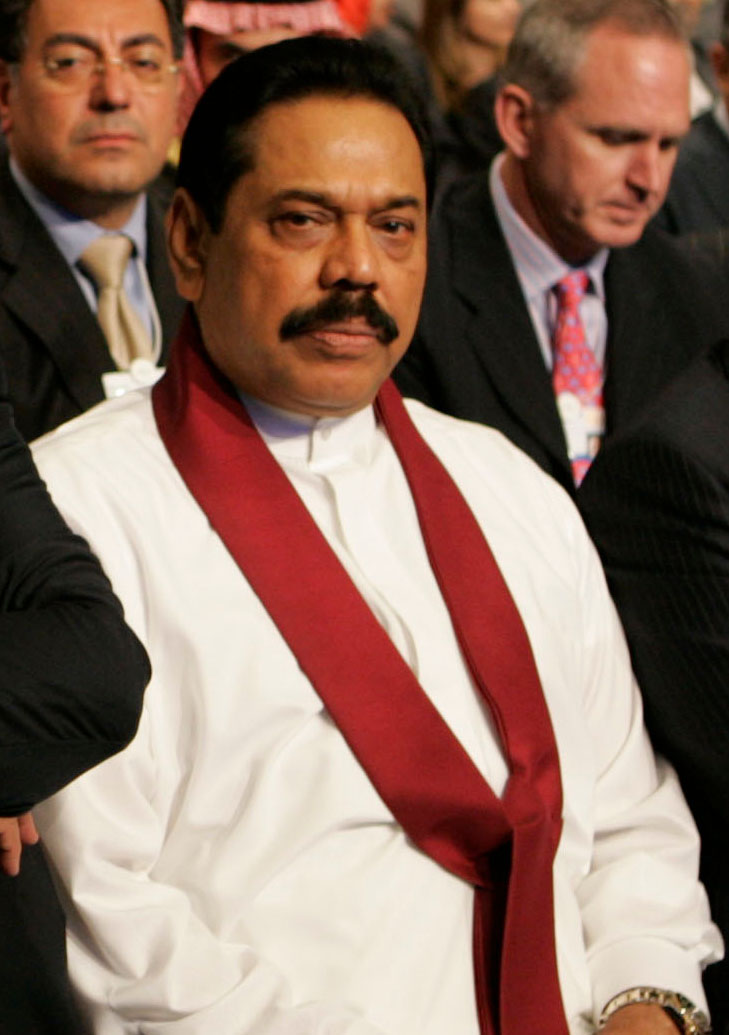
Alumnus Mahinda Rajapaksa, President of Sri Lanka (2005–2015)

Alumni of Thurstan College are known as Old Thurstanites. Notable alumni from the school include:

Name	Notability	Reference
Mahinda Rajapaksa	President of Sri Lanka (2005–2015), Prime Minister of Sri Lanka (2004–2005). Member of Parliament Kurunegala (2015–2024), Hambantota (1989–2005), Beliatta (1970–1977)	
Mohan Wijewickrama	Governor Eastern Province (2007–2015), Governor of North Eastern Province (2006)	
Dickson Sarathchandra Dela	Governor of Northern Province (2008–2009), Governor of Sabaragamuwa (2008)	
Jayantha Perera	Commander of the Navy (2014–2015)	
Chandra Fernando	Inspector General of Police (1971–2006)	
Jayantha Wickramarathne	Inspector General of Police (2008–2009)	
Nalin de Silva	Theoretical physicist, philosopher, political analyst	
Mahendra Perera	Actor	
Saranga Disasekara	Actor, TV presenter, singer	
Sachith Peiris	Music director, singer	
Sadeera Samarawickrama	International cricketer (2017–present)	
Sampath Thuyacontha	Secretary of defence (2024–present)	

== Sports ==
=== Cricket ===
Thurstan's under-16s cricket team was formed in 1953. Thurstan plays against Isipathana College in an annual cricket-encounter, called Big Match or Battle of the Brothers, at the beginning of the school cricket season. The contest has been held since 1963 and out of the 52 matches played, 41 have ended in a draw. Thurstan College won six times and Isipathana College won four times.

=== Rugby ===
Thurstan was the second government school in Ceylon (as Sri Lanka was called until 1972) to take to rugby, forming its rugby union team in 1957. In addition to the 'Abdul Jabar Trophy' which is played with the traditional rivals from Isipathana College, there are annual encounters for the 'Diyanesh Rajarathnam Memorial Trophy', which commenced in 1998 against Wesley College, and the 'Graetian Gunawardhana Challenge Trophy' in 2001 with D.S. Senanayake College.

== See also ==
- Royal Preparatory School
