= Results of the 2004 Sri Lankan general election by province =

Results of the 2004 Sri Lankan general election by province.

== Number of votes ==
Province	UPFA	UNF	TNA	JHU	SLMC	UCPF	EPDP	Ind	NDF	USP	CDUA	NLF	DPLF	Others	Valid Votes	Rejected Votes	Total Polled	Registered Electors	Turnout %
Central	459,335	591,472		55,465		49,728		1,416	1,912	2,885	10,736	797		1,791	1,175,537	89,446	1,264,983	1,629,426	77.63%
North Central	319,186	224,276		10,447				457	548	2,066		218		188	557,386	33,954	591,340	768,211	76.98%
North Eastern	176,327	97,586	633,654	2,107	186,876		24,416	7,087	98	1,054		588	7,326	1,814	1,138,933	71,634	1,210,567	1,778,162	68.08%
North Western	554,941	475,920		47,459				885	1,843	397		518		1,447	1,083,410	61,827	1,145,237	1,539,539	74.39%
Sabaragamuwa	475,717	392,131		38,835				1,058	1,073	1,136		1,643		1,541	913,134	54,031	967,165	1,217,334	79.45%
Southern	726,515	447,909		39,055				1,405	1,672	2,221		844		1,433	1,221,054	70,873	1,291,927	1,651,576	78.22%
Uva	296,090	252,772		9,607				866	768	723		324		1,141	562,291	42,975	605,266	773,857	78.21%
Western	1,215,859	1,022,134		349,749			539	2,691	7,042	4,178		3,529		5,266	2,610,987	110,208	2,721,195	3,541,034	76.85%
Total	4,223,970	3,504,200	633,654	552,724	186,876	49,728	24,955	15,865	14,956	14,660	10,736	8,461	7,326	14,621	9,262,732	534,948	9,797,680	12,899,139	75.96%

== Percentage of votes ==
Province	UPFA	UNF	TNA	JHU	SLMC	UCPF	EPDP	Ind	NDF	USP	CDUA	NLF	DPLF	Others	Total
Central	39.07%	50.32%		4.72%		4.23%		0.12%	0.16%	0.25%	0.91%	0.07%		0.15%	100.00%
North Central	57.26%	40.24%		1.87%				0.08%	0.10%	0.37%		0.04%		0.03%	100.00%
North Eastern	15.48%	8.57%	55.64%	0.18%	16.41%		2.14%	0.62%	0.01%	0.09%		0.05%	0.64%	0.16%	100.00%
North Western	51.22%	43.93%		4.38%				0.08%	0.17%	0.04%		0.05%		0.13%	100.00%
Sabaragamuwa	52.10%	42.94%		4.25%				0.12%	0.12%	0.12%		0.18%		0.17%	100.00%
Southern	59.50%	36.68%		3.20%				0.12%	0.14%	0.18%		0.07%		0.12%	100.00%
Uva	52.66%	44.95%		1.71%				0.15%	0.14%	0.13%		0.06%		0.20%	100.00%
Western	46.57%	39.15%		13.40%			0.02%	0.10%	0.27%	0.16%		0.14%		0.20%	100.00%
Total	45.60%	37.83%	6.84%	5.97%	2.02%	0.54%	0.27%	0.17%	0.16%	0.16%	0.12%	0.09%	0.08%	0.16%	100.00%

== Seats ==
Province	UPFA	UNF	TNA	JHU	SLMC	UCPF	EPDP	Ind	NDF	USP	CDUA	NLF	DPLF	Others	Total
Central	10	12		1		1		0	0	0	0	0		0	24
North Central	8	5		0				0	0	0		0		0	13
North Eastern	4	2	20	0	4		1	0	0	0		0	0	0	31
North Western	14	10		0				0	0	0		0		0	24
Sabaragamuwa	11	8		0				0	0	0		0		0	19
Southern	16	9		0				0	0	0		0		0	25
Uva	6	7		0				0	0	0		0		0	13
Western	23	18		6			0	0	0	0		0		0	47
National List	13	11	2	2	1	0	0	0	0	0	0	0	0	0	29
Total	105	82	22	9	5	1	1	0	0	0	0	0	0	0	225

== See also ==
Results of the 2004 Sri Lankan general election by electoral district
