= Results of the 2004 Sri Lankan general election by electoral district =

Results of the 2004 Sri Lankan general election by electoral district.

== Number of votes ==
Electoral District	Province	UPFA	UNP	TNA	JHU	SLMC	UCPF	EPDP	Ind	NDF	USP	CDUA	NLF	DPLF	Others	Valid Votes	Rejected Votes	Total Polled	Registered Electors	Turnout %
Ampara	NE	111,747	42,121	55,533	1,130	76,563		1,611	693	66	104		50		743	290,361	18,264	308,625	379,044	81.42%
Anuradhapura	NC	212,943	148,612		8,034				334	432	1,439		177		154	372,125	21,281	393,406	514,149	76.52%
Badulla	UV	178,634	181,705		6,932				662	610	588		248		799	370,178	30,159	400,337	511,115	78.33%
Batticaloa	NE	26,268	6,151	161,011	17	43,131		2,556	415	32	71		119	1,010	594	241,375	12,648	254,023	303,928	83.58%
Colombo	WE	414,688	441,841		190,618			539	1,242	2,420	894		2,037		3,687	1,057,966	38,605	1,096,571	1,467,751	74.71%
Galle	SO	306,385	209,399		22,826				514	626	456		457		848	541,511	30,380	571,891	716,709	79.79%
Gampaha	WE	509,963	367,572		102,516				850	4,622	2,852		932		695	990,002	40,862	1,030,864	1,327,145	77.68%
Hambantota	SO	178,895	98,877						350	328	239		195		426	279,310	17,724	297,034	384,361	77.28%
Jaffna	NE			257,320	95	1,995		18,612	5,307		291		266		140	284,026	21,233	305,259	644,279	47.38%
Kalutara	WE	291,208	212,721		56,615				599		432		560		884	563,019	30,741	593,760	746,138	79.58%
Kandy	CE	268,131	313,859		42,192				726	1,109	324		501		1,024	627,866	45,484	673,350	880,634	76.46%
Kegalle	SA	214,267	186,641		18,034				294	488	487		307		613	421,131	25,685	446,816	570,299	78.35%
Kurunegala	NW	412,157	340,768		37,459				575	1,058	265		349		1,016	793,647	40,396	834,043	1,089,482	76.55%
Matale	CE	108,259	100,642		8,819				440	271	1,135		109		387	220,062	19,549	239,611	312,556	76.66%
Matara	SO	241,235	139,633		16,229				541	718	1,526		192		159	400,233	22,769	423,002	550,506	76.84%
Monaragala	UV	117,456	71,067		2,675				204	158	135		76		342	192,113	12,816	204,929	262,742	78.00%
Nuwara Eliya	CE	82,945	176,971		4,454		49,728		250	532	1,426	10,736	187		380	327,609	24,413	352,022	436,236	80.70%
Polonnaruwa	NC	106,243	75,664		2,413				123	116	627		41		34	185,261	12,673	197,934	254,062	77.91%
Puttalam	NW	142,784	135,152		10,000				310	785	132		169		431	289,763	21,431	311,194	450,057	69.15%
Ratnapura	SA	261,450	205,490		20,801				764	585	649		1,336		928	492,003	28,346	520,349	647,035	80.42%
Trincomalee	NE	31,053	15,693	68,955	791	65,187		540	224				87		264	182,794	8,863	191,657	224,307	85.44%
Vanni	NE	7,259	33,621	90,835	74			1,097	448		588		66	6,316	73	140,377	10,626	151,003	226,604	66.64%
Total		4,223,970	3,504,200	633,654	552,724	186,876	49,728	24,955	15,865	14,956	14,660	10,736	8,461	7,326	14,621	9,262,732	534,948	9,797,680	12,899,139	75.96%

== Percentage of votes ==
Electoral District	Province	UPFA	UNP	TNA	JHU	SLMC	UCPF	EPDP	Ind	NDF	USP	CDUA	NLF	DPLF	Others	Total
Ampara	NE	38.49%	14.51%	19.13%	0.39%	26.37%		0.55%	0.24%	0.02%	0.04%		0.02%		0.26%	100.00%
Anuradhapura	NC	57.22%	39.94%		2.16%				0.09%	0.12%	0.39%		0.05%		0.04%	100.00%
Badulla	UV	48.26%	49.09%		1.87%				0.18%	0.16%	0.16%		0.07%		0.22%	100.00%
Batticaloa	NE	10.88%	2.55%	66.71%	0.01%	17.87%		1.06%	0.17%	0.01%	0.03%		0.05%	0.42%	0.25%	100.00%
Colombo	WE	39.20%	41.76%		18.02%			0.05%	0.12%	0.23%	0.08%		0.19%		0.35%	100.00%
Galle	SO	56.58%	38.67%		4.22%				0.09%	0.12%	0.08%		0.08%		0.16%	100.00%
Gampaha	WE	51.51%	37.13%		10.36%				0.09%	0.47%	0.29%		0.09%		0.07%	100.00%
Hambantota	SO	64.05%	35.40%						0.13%	0.12%	0.09%		0.07%		0.15%	100.00%
Jaffna	NE			90.60%	0.03%	0.70%		6.55%	1.87%		0.10%		0.09%		0.05%	100.00%
Kalutara	WE	51.72%	37.78%		10.06%				0.11%		0.08%		0.10%		0.16%	100.00%
Kandy	CE	42.71%	49.99%		6.72%				0.12%	0.18%	0.05%		0.08%		0.16%	100.00%
Kegalle	SA	50.88%	44.32%		4.28%				0.07%	0.12%	0.12%		0.07%		0.15%	100.00%
Kurunegala	NW	51.93%	42.94%		4.72%				0.07%	0.13%	0.03%		0.04%		0.13%	100.00%
Matale	CE	49.19%	45.73%		4.01%				0.20%	0.12%	0.52%		0.05%		0.18%	100.00%
Matara	SO	60.27%	34.89%		4.05%				0.14%	0.18%	0.38%		0.05%		0.04%	100.00%
Monaragala	UV	61.14%	36.99%		1.39%				0.11%	0.08%	0.07%		0.04%		0.18%	100.00%
Nuwara Eliya	CE	25.32%	54.02%		1.36%		15.18%		0.08%	0.16%	0.44%	3.28%	0.06%		0.12%	100.00%
Polonnaruwa	NC	57.35%	40.84%		1.30%				0.07%	0.06%	0.34%		0.02%		0.02%	100.00%
Puttalam	NW	49.28%	46.64%		3.45%				0.11%	0.27%	0.05%		0.06%		0.15%	100.00%
Ratnapura	SA	53.14%	41.77%		4.23%				0.16%	0.12%	0.13%		0.27%		0.19%	100.00%
Trincomalee	NE	16.99%	8.59%	37.72%	0.43%	35.66%		0.30%	0.12%				0.05%		0.14%	100.00%
Vanni	NE	5.17%	23.95%	64.71%	0.05%			0.78%	0.32%		0.42%		0.05%	4.50%	0.05%	100.00%
Total		45.60%	37.83%	6.84%	5.97%	2.02%	0.54%	0.27%	0.17%	0.16%	0.16%	0.12%	0.09%	0.08%	0.16%	100.00%

== Seats ==
Electoral District	Province	UPFA	UNP	TNA	JHU	SLMC	UCPF	EPDP	Ind	NDF	USP	CDUA	NLF	DPLF	Others	Total
Ampara	NE	3	1	1	0	2		0	0	0	0		0		0	7
Anuradhapura	NC	5	3		0				0	0	0		0		0	8
Badulla	UV	3	5		0				0	0	0		0		0	8
Batticaloa	NE	0	0	4	0	1		0	0	0	0		0	0	0	5
Colombo	WE	8	9		3			0	0	0	0		0		0	20
Galle	SO	6	4		0				0	0	0		0		0	10
Gampaha	WE	9	6		2				0	0	0		0		0	17
Hambantota	SO	5	2						0	0	0		0		0	7
Jaffna	NE			8	0	0		1	0		0		0		0	9
Kalutara	WE	6	3		1				0		0		0		0	10
Kandy	CE	5	6		1				0	0	0		0		0	12
Kegalle	SA	5	4		0				0	0	0		0		0	9
Kurunegala	NW	9	7		0				0	0	0		0		0	16
Matale	CE	3	2		0				0	0	0		0		0	5
Matara	SO	5	3		0				0	0	0		0		0	8
Monaragala	UV	3	2		0				0	0	0		0		0	5
Nuwara Eliya	CE	2	4		0		1		0	0	0	0	0		0	7
Polonnaruwa	NC	3	2		0				0	0	0		0		0	5
Puttalam	NW	5	3		0				0	0	0		0		0	8
Ratnapura	SA	6	4		0				0	0	0		0		0	10
Trincomalee	NE	1	0	2	0	1		0	0				0		0	4
Vanni	NE	0	1	5	0			0	0		0		0	0	0	6
National List		13	11	2	2	1	0	0	0	0	0	0	0	0	0	29
Total		105	82	22	9	5	1	1	0	0	0	0	0	0	0	225

== See also ==
Results of the 2004 Sri Lankan general election by province
