= Results of the 2000 Sri Lankan general election by province =

Results of the 2000 Sri Lankan general election by province.

== Number of votes ==
Province	PA	UNP	JVP	NUA	SU	TULF	Ind	EPDP	NLF	ACTC	TELO	CWC	DPLF	Others	Valid Votes	Rejected Votes	Total Polled	Registered Electors	Turnout %
Central	550,513	461,945	38,537	32,023	13,618		1,425		5,170			6,108		14,492	1,123,831	92,616	1,216,447	1,510,544	80.53%
North Central	249,447	227,061	32,435	11,346	1,591		348		3,626					2,599	528,453	30,630	559,083	702,095	79.63%
North Eastern	214,630	200,469	9,908	70,498	1,116	106,033	56,337	50,890		22,085	26,112	225	20,848	9,482	788,633	56,636	845,269	1,670,348	50.60%
North Western	497,541	451,189	52,036	24,244	8,606		1,278		5,651					6,907	1,047,452	50,665	1,098,117	1,419,884	77.34%
Sabaragamuwa	445,256	379,644	44,250	4,797	6,252		1,184							12,283	893,666	49,547	943,213	1,154,893	81.67%
Southern	578,599	477,984	122,419		8,989		2,151		3,946					6,151	1,200,239	56,740	1,256,979	1,563,186	80.41%
Uva	245,576	243,251	29,573	5,052	2,104		947		3,569			12,092		2,783	544,947	41,775	586,722	713,493	82.23%
Western	1,119,339	1,036,227	189,616	50,023	85,587		3,618		10,313	5,238		4,588		15,898	2,520,447	102,546	2,622,993	3,336,619	78.61%
Total	3,900,901	3,477,770	518,774	197,983	127,863	106,033	67,288	50,890	32,275	27,323	26,112	23,013	20,848	70,595	8,647,668	481,155	9,128,823	12,071,062	75.63%

== Percentage of votes ==
Province	PA	UNP	JVP	NUA	SU	TULF	Ind	EPDP	NLF	ACTC	TELO	CWC	DPLF	Others	Total
Central	48.99%	41.10%	3.43%	2.85%	1.21%		0.13%		0.46%			0.54%		1.29%	100.00%
North Central	47.20%	42.97%	6.14%	2.15%	0.30%		0.07%		0.69%					0.49%	100.00%
North Eastern	27.22%	25.42%	1.26%	8.94%	0.14%	13.45%	7.14%	6.45%		2.80%	3.31%	0.03%	2.64%	1.20%	100.00%
North Western	47.50%	43.07%	4.97%	2.31%	0.82%		0.12%		0.54%					0.66%	100.00%
Sabaragamuwa	49.82%	42.48%	4.95%	0.54%	0.70%		0.13%							1.37%	100.00%
Southern	48.21%	39.82%	10.20%		0.75%		0.18%		0.33%					0.51%	100.00%
Uva	45.06%	44.64%	5.43%	0.93%	0.39%		0.17%		0.65%			2.22%		0.51%	100.00%
Western	44.41%	41.11%	7.52%	1.98%	3.40%		0.14%		0.41%	0.21%		0.18%		0.63%	100.00%
Total	45.11%	40.22%	6.00%	2.29%	1.48%	1.23%	0.78%	0.59%	0.37%	0.32%	0.30%	0.27%	0.24%	0.82%	100.00%

== Seats ==
Province	PA	UNP	JVP	NUA	SU	TULF	Ind	EPDP	NLF	ACTC	TELO	CWC	DPLF	Others	Total
Central	13	10	0	1	0		0		0			0		0	24
North Central	7	6	0	0	0		0		0					0	13
North Eastern	9	6	0	2	0	5	1	4		1	3	0	0	0	31
North Western	13	9	1	0	0		0		0					0	23
Sabaragamuwa	11	8	0	0	0		0							0	19
Southern	12	10	3		0		0		0					0	25
Uva	6	7	0	0	0		0		0			0		0	13
Western	23	21	4	0	0		0		0	0		0		0	48
National List	13	12	2	1	1	0	0	0	0	0	0	0	0	0	29
Total	107	89	10	4	1	5	1	4	0	1	3	0	0	0	225

== See also ==
Results of the 2000 Sri Lankan general election by electoral district
