= Sachith =

Sachith (Sinhala: සචිත්) is a Sinhalese masculine given name that may refer to the following notable people:

- Sachith Aloka, Sri Lankan football forward
- Sachith Dhananjaya (born 1992), Chief Executive Officer (CEO) & Founder at Crynet Solutions
- Sachith Dias (born 1984), Sri Lankan cricketer
- Sachith Pathirana (born 1989), Sri Lankan cricketer
- Sachith Peiris (born 1986), Sri Lankan music director, playback singer and a video director
- Sachith Shiromal Wattage (born 1993), Lassana.com Warehouse Manager
