= List of Sri Lankan provincial governors =

This is a list of Sri Lankan provincial governors.

- List of governors of Central Province
- List of governors of Eastern Province
- List of governors of North Central Province
- List of governors of North Eastern Province
- List of governors of North Western Province
- List of governors of Northern Province, Sri Lanka
- List of governors of Sabaragamuwa
- List of governors of Southern Province
- List of governors of Uva
- List of governors of Western Province
