= Results of the 2000 Sri Lankan general election by electoral district =

Results of the 2000 Sri Lankan general election by electoral district.

== Number of votes ==
Electoral District	Province	PA	UNP	JVP	NUA	SU	TULF	Ind	EPDP	NLF	ACTC	TELO	CWC	DPLF	Others	Valid Votes	Rejected Votes	Total Polled	Registered Electors	Turnout %
Ampara	NE	136,423	101,628	5,696		238		21,655							1,160	266,800	16,521	283,321	352,537	80.37%
Anuradhapura	NC	169,424	144,662	21,274	9,369	976		235		2,461					2,181	350,582	20,561	371,143	472,661	78.52%
Badulla	UV	154,172	167,351	16,414	5,052	1,777		599		2,022			12,092		1,537	361,016	28,187	389,203	475,558	81.84%
Batticaloa	NE	16,510	29,165	295	53,646	135	54,448	6,571	3,325		6,968	3,909		9,030	2,439	186,441	11,205	197,646	275,485	71.74%
Colombo	WE	394,146	440,684	78,133	27,067	49,671		1,528		3,877	5,238		4,588		9,288	1,014,220	39,424	1,053,644	1,385,547	76.05%
Galle	SO	264,601	212,055	41,620		4,535		953		2,317					2,267	528,348	22,794	551,142	678,509	81.23%
Gampaha	WE	470,018	378,328	73,110	11,013	20,297		1,082		3,502					4,359	961,709	37,390	999,099	1,253,416	79.71%
Hambantota	SO	110,308	119,074	42,042		1,079		576		1,629					1,419	276,127	13,815	289,942	360,026	80.53%
Jaffna	NE		11,431	172	1,015	267	32,852	12,824	41,671		10,648			4,857	3,332	119,069	13,664	132,733	622,331	21.33%
Kalutara	WE	255,175	217,215	38,373	11,943	15,619		1,008		2,934					2,251	544,518	25,732	570,250	697,656	81.74%
Kandy	CE	282,282	243,623	21,565	32,023	10,999		734		2,820			6,108		4,774	604,928	41,748	646,676	812,478	79.59%
Kegalle	SA	201,114	175,627	22,028	4,797	4,549		645							2,652	411,412	22,728	434,140	545,238	79.62%
Kurunegala	NW	358,794	332,623	40,780	11,927	6,691		865		3,692					5,385	760,757	35,621	796,378	1,007,410	79.05%
Matale	CE	110,213	91,836	10,673		1,458		75		2,350					1,492	218,097	15,719	233,816	292,652	79.90%
Matara	SO	203,690	146,855	38,757		3,375		622							2,465	395,764	20,131	415,895	524,651	79.27%
Monaragala	UV	91,404	75,900	13,159		327		348		1,547					1,246	183,931	13,588	197,519	237,935	83.01%
Nuwara Eliya	CE	158,018	126,486	6,299		1,161		616							8,226	300,806	35,149	335,955	405,414	82.87%
Polonnaruwa	NC	80,023	82,399	11,161	1,977	615		113		1,165					418	177,871	10,069	187,940	229,434	81.91%
Puttalam	NW	138,747	118,566	11,256	12,317	1,915		413		1,959					1,522	286,695	15,044	301,739	412,474	73.15%
Ratnapura	SA	244,142	204,017	22,222		1,703		539							9,631	482,254	26,819	509,073	609,655	83.50%
Trincomalee	NE	53,860	46,700	3,301		372	14,090	5,014	4,524		3,748	498			1,023	133,130	8,642	141,772	206,884	68.53%
Vanni	NE	7,837	11,545	444	15,837	104	4,643	10,273	1,370		721	21,705	225	6,961	1,528	83,193	6,604	89,797	213,111	42.14%
Total		3,900,901	3,477,770	518,774	197,983	127,863	106,033	67,288	50,890	32,275	27,323	26,112	23,013	20,848	70,595	8,647,668	481,155	9,128,823	12,071,062	75.63%

== Percentage of votes ==
Electoral District	Province	PA	UNP	JVP	NUA	SU	TULF	Ind	EPDP	NLF	ACTC	TELO	CWC	DPLF	Others	Total
Ampara	NE	51.13%	38.09%	2.13%		0.09%		8.12%							0.43%	100.00%
Anuradhapura	NC	48.33%	41.26%	6.07%	2.67%	0.28%		0.07%		0.70%					0.62%	100.00%
Badulla	UV	42.71%	46.36%	4.55%	1.40%	0.49%		0.17%		0.56%			3.35%		0.43%	100.00%
Batticaloa	NE	8.86%	15.64%	0.16%	28.77%	0.07%	29.20%	3.52%	1.78%		3.74%	2.10%		4.84%	1.31%	100.00%
Colombo	WE	38.86%	43.45%	7.70%	2.67%	4.90%		0.15%		0.38%	0.52%		0.45%		0.92%	100.00%
Galle	SO	50.08%	40.14%	7.88%		0.86%		0.18%		0.44%					0.43%	100.00%
Gampaha	WE	48.87%	39.34%	7.60%	1.15%	2.11%		0.11%		0.36%					0.45%	100.00%
Hambantota	SO	39.95%	43.12%	15.23%		0.39%		0.21%		0.59%					0.51%	100.00%
Jaffna	NE		9.60%	0.14%	0.85%	0.22%	27.59%	10.77%	35.00%		8.94%			4.08%	2.80%	100.00%
Kalutara	WE	46.86%	39.89%	7.05%	2.19%	2.87%		0.19%		0.54%					0.41%	100.00%
Kandy	CE	46.66%	40.27%	3.56%	5.29%	1.82%		0.12%		0.47%			1.01%		0.79%	100.00%
Kegalle	SA	48.88%	42.69%	5.35%	1.17%	1.11%		0.16%							0.64%	100.00%
Kurunegala	NW	47.16%	43.72%	5.36%	1.57%	0.88%		0.11%		0.49%					0.71%	100.00%
Matale	CE	50.53%	42.11%	4.89%		0.67%		0.03%		1.08%					0.68%	100.00%
Matara	SO	51.47%	37.11%	9.79%		0.85%		0.16%							0.62%	100.00%
Monaragala	UV	49.69%	41.27%	7.15%		0.18%		0.19%		0.84%					0.68%	100.00%
Nuwara Eliya	CE	52.53%	42.05%	2.09%		0.39%		0.20%							2.73%	100.00%
Polonnaruwa	NC	44.99%	46.33%	6.27%	1.11%	0.35%		0.06%		0.65%					0.24%	100.00%
Puttalam	NW	48.40%	41.36%	3.93%	4.30%	0.67%		0.14%		0.68%					0.53%	100.00%
Ratnapura	SA	50.63%	42.30%	4.61%		0.35%		0.11%							2.00%	100.00%
Trincomalee	NE	40.46%	35.08%	2.48%		0.28%	10.58%	3.77%	3.40%		2.82%	0.37%			0.77%	100.00%
Vanni	NE	9.42%	13.88%	0.53%	19.04%	0.13%	5.58%	12.35%	1.65%		0.87%	26.09%	0.27%	8.37%	1.84%	100.00%
Total		45.11%	40.22%	6.00%	2.29%	1.48%	1.23%	0.78%	0.59%	0.37%	0.32%	0.30%	0.27%	0.24%	0.82%	100.00%

== Seats ==
Electoral District	Province	PA	UNP	JVP	NUA	SU	TULF	Ind	EPDP	NLF	ACTC	TELO	CWC	DPLF	Others	Total
Ampara	NE	4	2	0		0		1							0	7
Anuradhapura	NC	5	3	0	0	0		0		0					0	8
Badulla	UV	3	5	0	0	0		0		0			0		0	8
Batticaloa	NE	1	1	0	1	0	2	0	0		0	0		0	0	5
Colombo	WE	8	10	2	0	0		0		0	0		0		0	20
Galle	SO	5	4	1		0		0		0					0	10
Gampaha	WE	10	7	1	0	0		0		0					0	18
Hambantota	SO	2	4	1		0		0		0					0	7
Jaffna	NE		1	0	0	0	3	0	4		1			0	0	9
Kalutara	WE	5	4	1	0	0		0		0					0	10
Kandy	CE	6	5	0	1	0		0		0			0		0	12
Kegalle	SA	5	4	0	0	0		0							0	9
Kurunegala	NW	8	6	1	0	0		0		0					0	15
Matale	CE	3	2	0		0		0		0					0	5
Matara	SO	5	2	1		0		0							0	8
Monaragala	UV	3	2	0		0		0		0					0	5
Nuwara Eliya	CE	4	3	0		0		0							0	7
Polonnaruwa	NC	2	3	0	0	0		0		0					0	5
Puttalam	NW	5	3	0	0	0		0		0					0	8
Ratnapura	SA	6	4	0		0		0							0	10
Trincomalee	NE	3	1	0		0	0	0	0		0	0			0	4
Vanni	NE	1	1		1	0	0	0	0		0	3	0	0	0	6
National List		13	12	2	1	1	0	0	0	0	0	0	0	0	0	29
Total		107	89	10	4	1	5	1	4	0	1	3	0	0	0	225

== See also ==
- Results of the 2000 Sri Lankan general election by province
