= Aloka =

Aloka may refer to:

== People ==
Given name

- Aloka Amarasiri (born 1989), Sri Lankan cricketer
- Āloka David Smith (1946–2015), British Buddhist practitioner
- Aloka McLean (born 1981), Canadian actress

Surname

- Sachith Aloka, Sri Lankan football forward

== Animals ==
- Aloka (dog), rescue dog of Indian origin and companion of Buddhist monks in the United States
