= MV Uhana =

Sri Lankan merchant vessel

MV Uhana was a Sri Lankan merchant vessel that was subjected to a suicide attack in June 2000 while being escorted to Jaffna by the Sri Lankan Navy. A speedboat loaded with explosives positioned itself next to the Sri Lankan vessel, near Point Pedro, before blowing itself up. According to Rohitha Bogollagama, the Minister of Foreign Affairs of Sri Lanka, the Tamil Tigers were behind the attack. He compared the attack on the Uhana to al Qaeda's attack on the USS Cole, four months later. He suggested that al Qaeda and the Tamil Tigers learned techniques from one another.
