= Reactions to the end of the Sri Lankan civil war =

Reactions to the end of the Sri Lankan Civil War on 18 May 2009 were generally positive and welcoming, while some countries expressed concern over the civilian casualties and the humanitarian impact.

== Sri Lanka ==
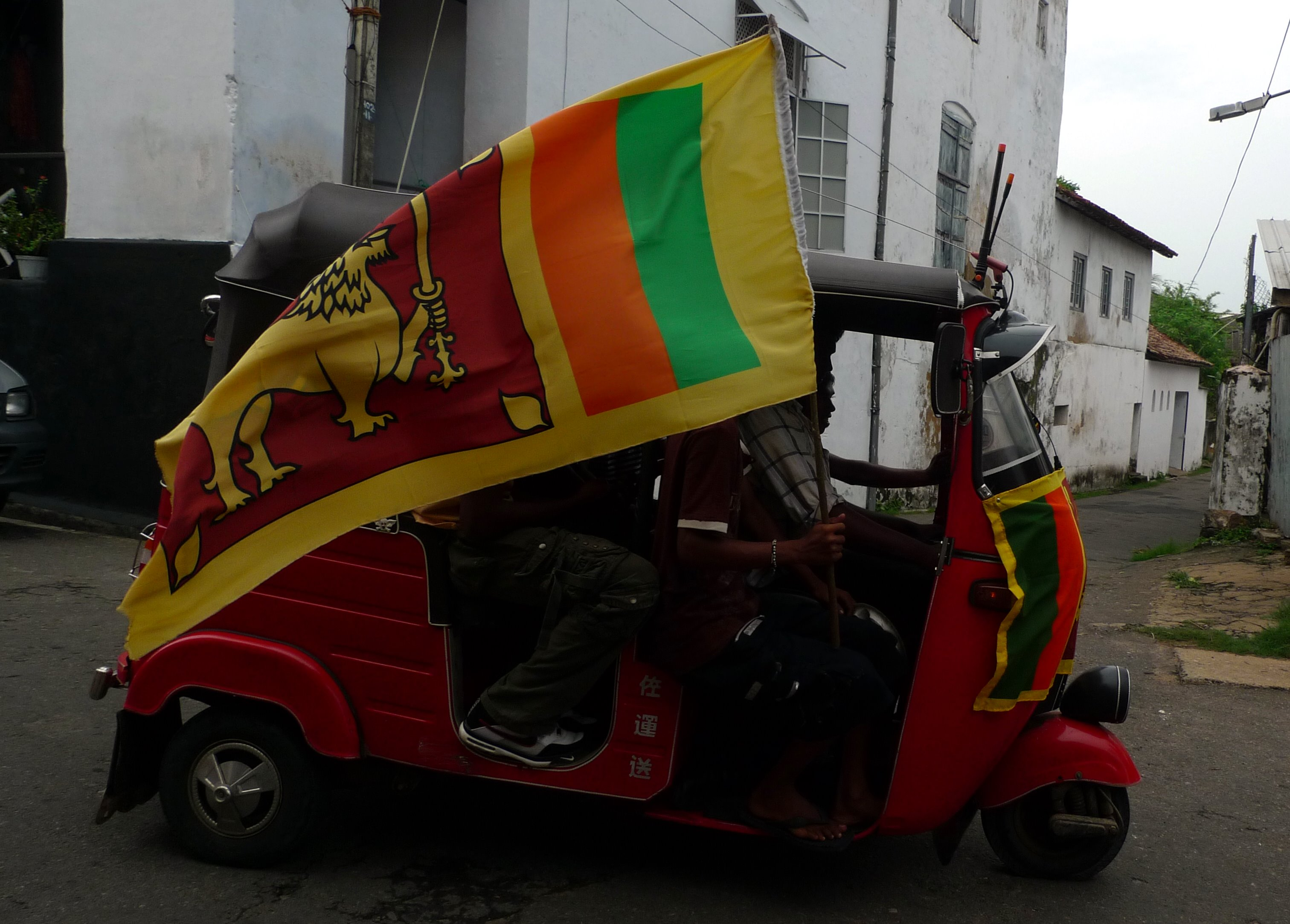
Crowd celebrate with Sri Lankan Flag. Victory celebrations were held all over the country

Streets were filled with joyous scenes of jubilation. United National Party leader Ranil Wickremasinghe, through a telephone call, congratulated President Mahinda Rajapaksa and the state's security forces on 18 May 2009 for their victory over the LTTE. In a press release issued that day, Roman Catholic Archbishop Oswald Gomis said:

I congratulate His Excellency President Mahinda Rajapakse, President of the Democratic Socialist Republic of Sri Lanka, for his very courageous leadership and thank the Chiefs of the Defense outfit who supported him with deep commitment and self-sacrifice. I also offer my deepest sympathies to those who laid down their lives in battle and those innocent civilians killed, trapped in war.

In a sense we could say that we have won the battle but the war is not ended. The war would end only on the day that we grow in nationhood realizing that we are all one people in one country with equal right. We have to realize the fact that we are a multi-ethnic, multi-religious and multi-cultural community. As such we are now left with the great task of nation- building forgetting our ethnic, political and religious differences.

It is imperative that there be a political formula that will inspire confidence and promote a sense of belonging among the minority groups in the country. We have to leave the sad and bitter memories of the past three decades and look positively and optimistically towards the future in hope. All of us have to share the blame for our division and forgive each other. We should have the humility and wisdom to learn from the sad experiences of that past.

It is then, and only then, that we could build nationhood that will bring true peace and prosperity to our beloved country – Sri Lanka. Let us always remember that united we will flourish but divided we will perish.

With the announced end of the war, Sri Lanka's stock exchange registered its sixth highest percentage gain ever.

== International organisations ==
United Nations – At a press conference in Geneva on 19 May 2009, United Nations Secretary General Ban Ki-moon said, "I am relieved by the conclusion of the military operation, but I am deeply troubled by the loss of so many civilian lives. The task now facing the people of Sri Lanka is immense and requires all hands. It is most important that every effort be undertaken to begin a process of healing and national reconciliation. I listened very carefully to what President Rajapaksa said in his address to Parliament today. The legitimate concerns and aspirations of the Tamil people and other minorities must be fully addressed." The Secretary General went on to announce his upcoming visit to the wartorn region.

European Union – The European Council met in Brussels on 18 May 2009, during which it adopted a statement calling on "the Government of Sri Lanka urgently to proceed towards a comprehensive political process" and "the President of Sri Lanka to outline a clear process leading to a fully inclusive political solution, based on consent, equality and the rule of law". The Council stated that such moves are the only way toward long-term security, post-conflict reconstruction and prosperity in Sri Lanka. The statement concluded: "The EU continues to call for appropriate action by the United Nations Human Rights Council." The Times reported that EU member nations sold arms to the Sri Lankan government in spite of fears of human rights abuses.

== Other countries ==
=== Asia ===
India – The Indian Ministry of External Affairs issued a statement on 18 May 2009 saying "In a telephone conversation with External Affairs Minister Shri Pranab Mukherjee earlier today, the President of Sri Lanka confirmed that armed resistance by the LTTE has come to an end and that LTTE leader Velupillai Prabhakaran is dead. India will work with the people and Government of Sri Lanka to provide relief to those affected by the tragic conflict, and to rapidly rehabilitate all those who have been displaced, bringing their lives to normalcy as soon as possible. It is our view that as the conventional conflict in Sri Lanka comes to an end, this is the moment when the root causes of conflict in Sri Lanka can be addressed. This would include political steps towards the effective devolution of power within the Sri Lankan Constitution so that Sri Lankans of all communities, including the Tamils, can feel at home and lead lives of dignity of their own free will."

Iran – Foreign Minister of the Islamic Republic of Iran Manouchehr Mottaki telephoned Foreign Minister Rohitha Bogollagama on 19 May 2009 to extend his warm congratulations to the President, the Foreign Minister and the Government of Sri Lanka on the success achieved by Sri Lanka in defeating LTTE terrorism. "Iran has maintained close relations with Sri Lanka and has always condemned terrorism and, consistently upheld the sovereignty and the territorial integrity of Sri Lanka". He states that he was speaking on behalf of the President of Iran who has conveyed his best wishes to Sri Lanka and will personally speak to the President of Sri Lanka at a mutually convenient time. Iran has also offered assistance through the Red Crescent, for the emergency relief operations for the IDPs in the North.

Japan – The Japanese premier's office released a statement of Prime Minister Taro Aso's telephone conversation with Sri Lankan President Mahinda Rajapaksa. The statement said the Prime Minister "welcomed the end of the civil war between the Sri Lankan government and the Liberation Tigers of Tamil Eelam", and that "it is now important to help internally displaced people and their resettlement as well as to start showing improvement in the political process towards peace-building". It also outlined that poverty was one of the factors that create fertile ground for terrorism and said he would like to see Sri Lanka build infrastructure, adding that Japan would support Sri Lanka's efforts as much as possible.

Maldives – Both President Mohamed Nasheed and Vice-president Mohamed Waheed Hassan congratulated the government and people of Sri Lanka for their tremendous success in effecting an end to the decades-old conflict in their country. The President reaffirmed continued their support and solidarity with the government and people of Sri Lanka, as Sri Lanka celebrates as a unified nation. "I take this opportunity to express on behalf of the Government and the people of Maldives our sincerest best wishes to Your Excellency and the people of Sri Lanka". "This momentous occasion in Sri Lanka’s history will pave the way towards realising greater equality and justice for all Sri Lankans."

Pakistan – Minister of State for Foreign Affairs of Pakistan, Nawabzada Malik Amad Khan telephoned Deputy Minister of Foreign Affairs of Sri Lanka, Hussein A. Bhaila congratulating Sri Lanka's "great victory over terrorism". The Pakistani State Minister stated that Pakistan has always been a steadfast friend of Sri Lanka and strongly supported the country's unity, sovereignty and territorial integrity and re-affirmed his government's continued cooperation with Sri Lanka in countering terrorism. He requested the Deputy Minister to convey his good wishes and felicitations to President Mahinda Rajapaksa and Foreign Minister, Rohitha Bogollagama.

Philippines – A Department of Foreign Affairs press release, dated 22 May 2009: "welcomes the return of law and order in northern Sri Lanka and supports the Government of Sri Lanka’s search for a comprehensive, fair, and lasting political solution to the problems faced by its Tamil minority. The Philippines hopes that a lasting political solution will be crafted in order that the Tamil minority share in the fruits of peace in their country."

Singapore – The Singapore Ministry of Foreign Affairs issued the following statement 29 May 2009 after Minister for Foreign Affairs George Yeo met Sri Lankan Minister of Foreign Affairs Rohitha Bogollagama at the Shangri-La Dialogue held in Singapore: "Singapore is relieved to see an end to the long-standing conflict in Sri Lanka. The conflict had taken a great toll on the country. Not only have tens of thousands of lives been lost, but hundreds of thousands of Sri Lankan civilians have also been displaced from their homes. The final cessation of military operations by the Sri Lankan Government provides a short window of opportunity to close a sad chapter of history and quickly begin a process of genuine national healing and reconciliation. A long term agreement taking into full consideration the interests of all communities within Sri Lanka must be forged and implemented to ensure a lasting peace." George Yeo congratulated Rohitha Bogollagama and the Sri Lankan government on the victory over LTTE terrorists.

Turkey – The president of Sri Lanka, Mahinda Rajapaksa, telephoned the president of Turkey, Abdullah Gül. The conversation was released by the Turkish Presidency Media Center. The Sri Lankan president informed Gül about the recent achievements in the fight against terrorism. President Gül stated that he was pleased with the recent events and Turkey was ready to provide humanitarian aid, in the telephone conversation.

Vietnam – On 21 May 2009, Foreign Affairs Ministry spokesman Le Dung released the following statement in response to journalist inquiries: "Vietnam welcomes the recent victory of the Government and people of Sri Lanka. This victory will create favorable conditions for Sri Lanka to concentrate on the cause of national construction and development, contributing to peace, stability and development in the region."

=== Africa ===
South Africa – The South African government released a statement through Deputy International Relations and Cooperation Minister Ebrahim Ebrahim regarding the end of military operations in Sri Lanka. "The South African government expresses grave regret at the manner in which the military offensive was conducted and urges the United Nations Human Rights Commission to urgently investigate possible violations of international human rights law and contraventions of the Geneva Convention.", said Ebrahim. The statement also called for immediate humanitarian aid and international media access to the areas affected. "The South African government has noted the conciliatory tone in the speech of President Mahinda Rajapaksa on 19 May 2009 and express our hope that the end of the military campaign will result in a peaceful dialogue with all minorities to address their long standing grievances. We will continue to support any efforts aimed at bringing about peace and reconciliation between the parties."

=== Europe ===
Norway – Norwegian Foreign Minister Jonas Gahr Støre said in a statement "our thoughts go to all who have lost relatives and loved ones in the war. We must cooperate to aid the victims. People in the refugee camps must quickly be allowed to return home." Støre also said the situation in the refugee camps for internally displaced people must be improved, in line with demands made by the United Nations.

Russia – "The government of Russia has extended warmest congratulations to the president and the government of Sri Lanka on the success achieved by the island nation in defeating LTTE (Liberation Tigers of Tamil Eelam) terrorism," the Department of Government Information said in a statement. Officials from Sri Lanka's Foreign Ministry said Russia has said that it supports the fight of the Sri Lankan government against terrorism and separatism. Russia hoped that the end to the bloody armed conflict that lasted in Sri Lanka for more than a quarter century will be a guarantee of the establishment of an enduring peace, security and stability in the country.

Switzerland – In a press statement dated 19 May 2009, Switzerland's government welcomed the end of the armed conflict. However, Switzerland "regrets that international humanitarian law has been violated and appeals to all parties to comply with and to ensure respect for international regulations and obligations in all circumstances. Switzerland calls on all parties to refrain from incitement to hatred and to work towards reconciliation by means of unilateral or jointly agreed measures. All parties and groupings as well as members of the diaspora should work openly and in conjunction with international institutions to initiate a reconciliation process and a sustainable solution in the framework of a political dialogue."

United Kingdom – Foreign Secretary David Miliband made the following written statement to the House of Commons on 19 May 2009: "On 19 May, the Sri Lankan President formally announced that on 18 May military forces had retaken all the territory once held by the LTTE and that they had captured or killed the senior leadership of that organisation. Many Sri Lankans of all communities, Sinhalese, Tamil and Muslim, will be relieved that the long and brutal conflict may at last be over. Sri Lanka has before it an historic opportunity to resolve the underlying causes of the conflict and ensure a lasting peace. We must continue to work with Sri Lanka’s Government and all its communities to ensure that this opportunity is taken and that it leads to a sustainable end to the conflict. The continuing focus of this Government’s activity over the coming days and weeks, will be to work with international partners in encouraging the Sri Lankan Government to devote as much energy to winning the peace as it did to winning the war."

Lord Malloch Brown, the Minister of State Foreign and Commonwealth office in UK said, in the House of Lords, "Indeed, in our initial contacts with the president, we congratulated him on finishing of a brutal 26-year war, which was instigated by the Tamil Tigers-a terrorist group" replying to Lord Naseby who raised the matter in the House of Lords. Agreeing with Lord Naseby, Lord Malloch Brown said, "the political solution to this must come from inside Sri Lanka from a process set up and led by President Rajapaksa." Speaking further, Brown said, "But we also made it extremely clear to him that, whether or not that victory would be seen as the opening of a new and happier chapter in Sri Lanka depended on whether he could now go that next step and show the statesmanship to find a political as well as humanitarian solution to this community's issues." He further said, "On 17 May, the Prime Minister announced an additional œ5 million in humanitarian aid for Sri Lanka, taking the total to œ12.5 million since September 2008." Speaking before him Lord Naseby said, "My Lords, have Her Majesty's Government congratulated the Sri Lankan Government on defeating the Tamil Tigers and bringing peace to the country? On the international front, is it Her Majesty's Government's policy primarily to tackle the resettlement of the 250,000 Tamils and the 100,000 Muslims who were ethnically cleansed from Jaffna, or is it to continue to lecture that there should be a constitutional settlement, which really rests with the Parliament of Sri Lanka?"

=== Americas ===
Canada – Minister of Foreign Affairs Lawrence Cannon stated "Canadians are very concerned about the aftermath of the military action in Sri Lanka and the appalling effect it has had on civilians. This terrible, decades-long war has inflicted untold devastation and heartbreak on Sri Lankans. The Government of Canada wishes to express its concerns about civilian casualties, and to convey its condolences to the people of Sri Lanka and those around the world who have lost friends and family members in this horrific conflict. Canada urges the Government of Sri Lanka to begin to find a long-term political solution that responds to the legitimate aspirations of all the people of Sri Lanka. Canada is prepared to assist Sri Lankan efforts to find political reconciliation and a lasting peace."

United States – At a press conference in Washington, D.C., on 18 May 2009, United States Department of State spokesman Ian Kelly said: "The Department of State welcomes the fact that the fighting has ended, and we are relieved that the immense loss of life and killing of innocent civilians appears to be over. This is an opportunity for Sri Lanka to turn the page on its past and build a Sri Lanka rooted in democracy, tolerance, and respect for human rights. Now is the time for the government to engage the Tamils, Sinhalese, and other Sri Lankans to create a political arrangement that promotes and protects the rights of all Sri Lankans. It is also vital for the government to provide for the needs of the 280,000 civilians now living in relief camps. Providing food, water, shelter, basic health care, and sanitation, as well as expediting their return to their homes should be a top priority for the government."

The Sri Lankan defence ministry said that US Ambassador to Sri Lanka Robert O. Blake Jr., called Foreign Minister Rohitha Bogollagama on 18 May 2009 regarding humanitarian aid to displaced persons and reconciliation with the Tamil people.
