= Asoka Jayawardena =

Sri Lankan general, politician

Major General Deshamanya Asoka Jayawardena RWP, RSP, VSV, USP

4th Governor of North Eastern Province
- In office 13 November 1998 – 30 November 2004
- Preceded by: Gamini Fonseka
- Succeeded by: Tyronne Fernando

Personal details
- Spouse: Srimathi (m. 1975; d. 2002)
- Children: Two children
- Education: S. Thomas' College, Colombo

Military service
- Allegiance: Sri Lanka
- Branch/service: Sri Lanka Army
- Years of service: 19?? – 1998
- Rank: Major general
- Unit: Sri Lanka Light Infantry
- Commands: Security Forces Headquarters - Jaffna; Overall Operational Commander
- Battles/wars: Sri Lankan Civil War

Major General Deshamanya Asoka Kanthilal Jayawardena, RWP, RSP, VSV, USP, was a Sri Lankan army general and politician. He was the former Provincial Governor of the Governor of North Eastern Province and Secretary to the Minister of Defence.

== Military career ==
Jayawardena was Overall Operational Commander (OOC) of the Sri Lanka Army. In 1997 he was succeeded by Lt. Gen. Srilal Weerasooriya. Jayawardena also served as Security Forces Commander in Jaffna.

== Political career ==
Retiring from the Sri Lanka Army in 1998, Jayawardena was appointed Governor of North Eastern Province. His predecessor Gamini Fonseka resigned from the office due to a difference of opinion with the President at the time. He is known to be a close confidant of the President Chandrika Kumaratunga, and he is believed to be one of her principal military advisors.

Jayawardena was the first governor of the province to visit the Jaffna Peninsula after the establishment of the North Eastern Provincial Council.

== Awards ==
His awards and decorations include the Medals; Rana Wickrama Padakkama (RWP), Rana Sura Padakkama (RSP), Vishista Seva Vibhushanaya (VSV) and Uttama Seva Padakkama (USP).

In 2005 he was awarded the National title, Deshamanya.

=== Sri Lankan awards ===
In Order of Precedence

- Rana Wickrama Padakkama
- Rana Sura Padakkama
- Vishista Seva Vibhushanaya
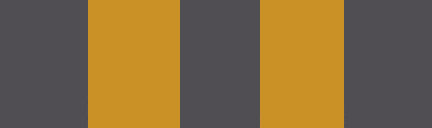
- Uttama Seva Padakkama

Military offices
Preceded by ?	Overall Operations Commander ?	Succeeded by Lt. Gen. Srilal Weerasooriya
Political offices
Preceded by Gamini Fonseka	Governor of North Eastern Province; 1998–2004	Succeeded by Tyronne Fernando
