= Senthil Thondaman =

Sri Lankan politician

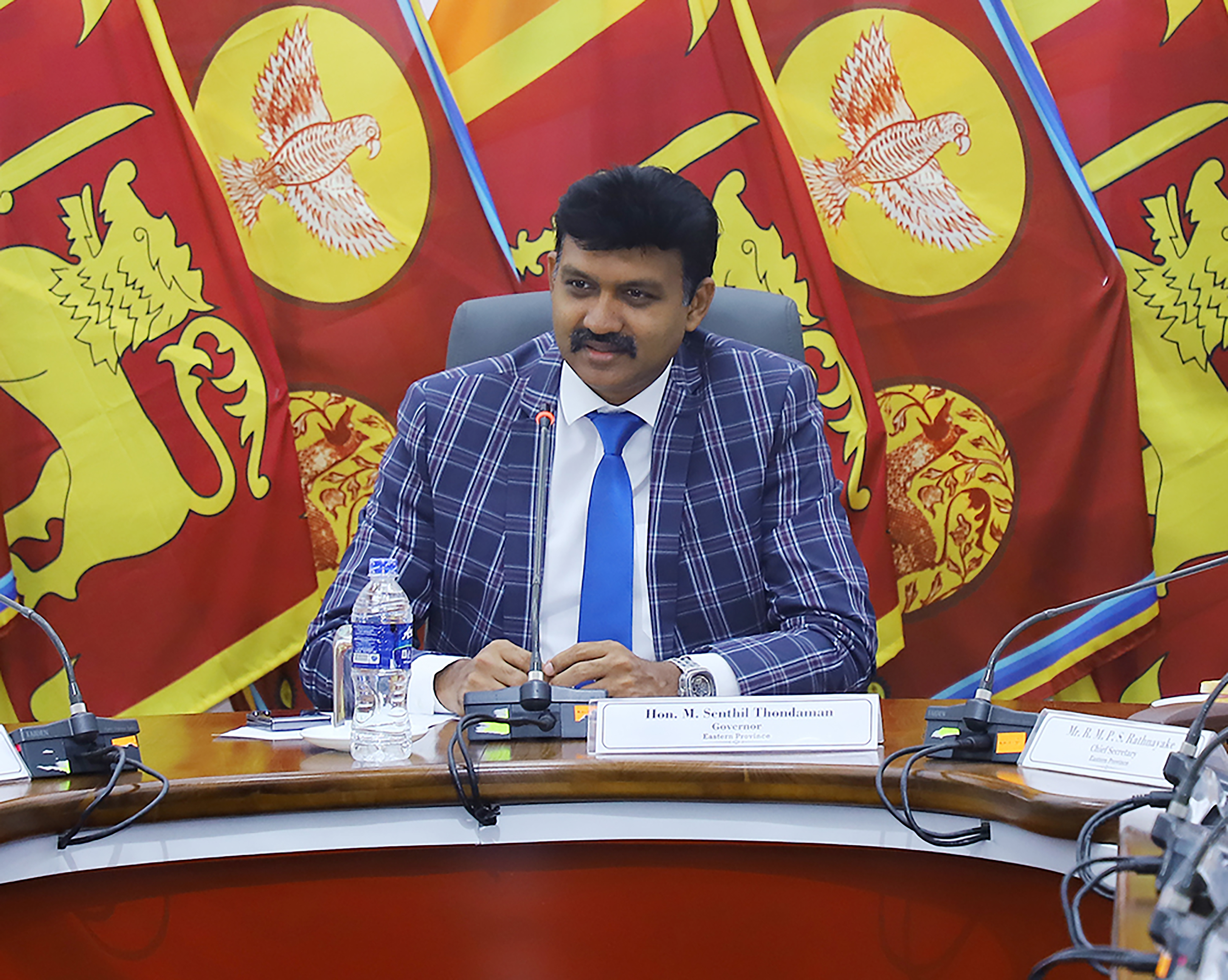
- Senthil in 2024

7th Governor of the Eastern Province
- In office 17 May 2023 – 23 September 2024
- Preceded by: Anuradha Yahampath
- Succeeded by: Jayantha Lal Ratnasekera

Personal details
- Born: Muththuvinayagam Senthil Thondaman
- Party: Ceylon Workers' Congress

Senthil Thondaman is a Sri Lankan politician. He served as Governor of the Eastern Province from 2023 to 2024.

Thondaman is the current president of the Ceylon Workers' Congress, prior to his appointment as Governor.
