= Nalin de Silva =

Sri Lankan philosopher (1944–2024)

- නලින් ද සිල්වා
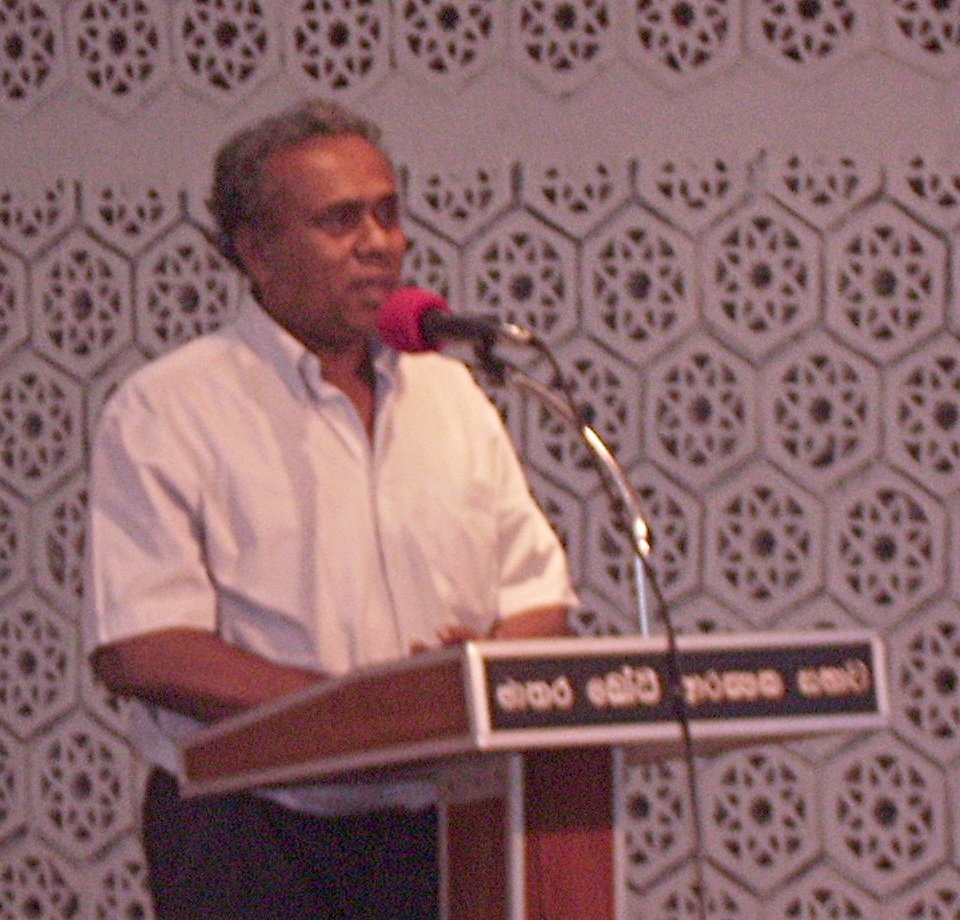
- De Silva in 2006
- Born: 20 October 1944; Kovilagodella, Panadura, British Ceylon
- Died: 1 May 2024 (aged 79); Fremont, California, United States

Education
- Education: Bauddhaloka Maha Vidyalaya; Thurstan College Colombo; Royal College Colombo; University of Ceylon; University of Sussex
- Doctoral advisor: William McCrea

Philosophical work
- School: Buddhist philosophy Constructivism; Relativism; Nationalism
- Main interests: Epistemology, general relativity, quantum mechanics
- Notable ideas: Constructive relativism, Chinthanaya
- Website: www.kalaya.org http://www1.kalaya.org/

Thakurartha Devadithya Guardiyawasam Lindamulage Nalin Kumar de Silva (Sinhala: නලින් ද සිල්වා; 20 October 1944 – 1 May 2024) was a Sri Lankan philosopher, polymath and a political analyst. He was the former Sri Lankan ambassador in Myanmar. He was a professor in the department of mathematics, a member of University Grant Commission and the dean of the faculty of science at the University of Kelaniya, Sri Lanka.

De Silva openly stated that the so-called 'objective scientific method' was a lie.

In June 2011 he stated that information regarding the presence of arsenic in water claiming that the cause of Rajarata chronic kidney disease had been given to him by the god Natha. The Sri Lanka Association for the Advancement of Science, an organisation in which De Silva claimed lifelong membership, has said that they consider it "extremely unfortunate that the Dean of a Science Faculty should make it his publicly stated aim to run down science and bring it into disrepute." However the presence of arsenic was verified in water and vegetation, and the source was found to be agrochemical fertilizers.

== Early life and education ==
Nalin de Silva was born on 20 October 1944 in Kovilagodella, Panadura, Sri Lanka. His father was Daniel De Silva, a principal, and his mother was Jayline Perera, a school teacher. De Silva was the eldest of eight siblings. He had primary education at Bauddhaloka Maha Vidyalaya, Thurstan College Colombo and secondary education at Royal College Colombo. He captained the Sinhala Debating team at Royal College and won the Weerasooriya medal for oratory. He entered the University of Ceylon in 1963 and graduated in mathematics in 1967. De Silva entered University of Sussex in January 1969, where he obtained his doctorate in theoretical physics –cosmology – in 1970.

He was married and had two sons and one daughter.

== Academic work ==
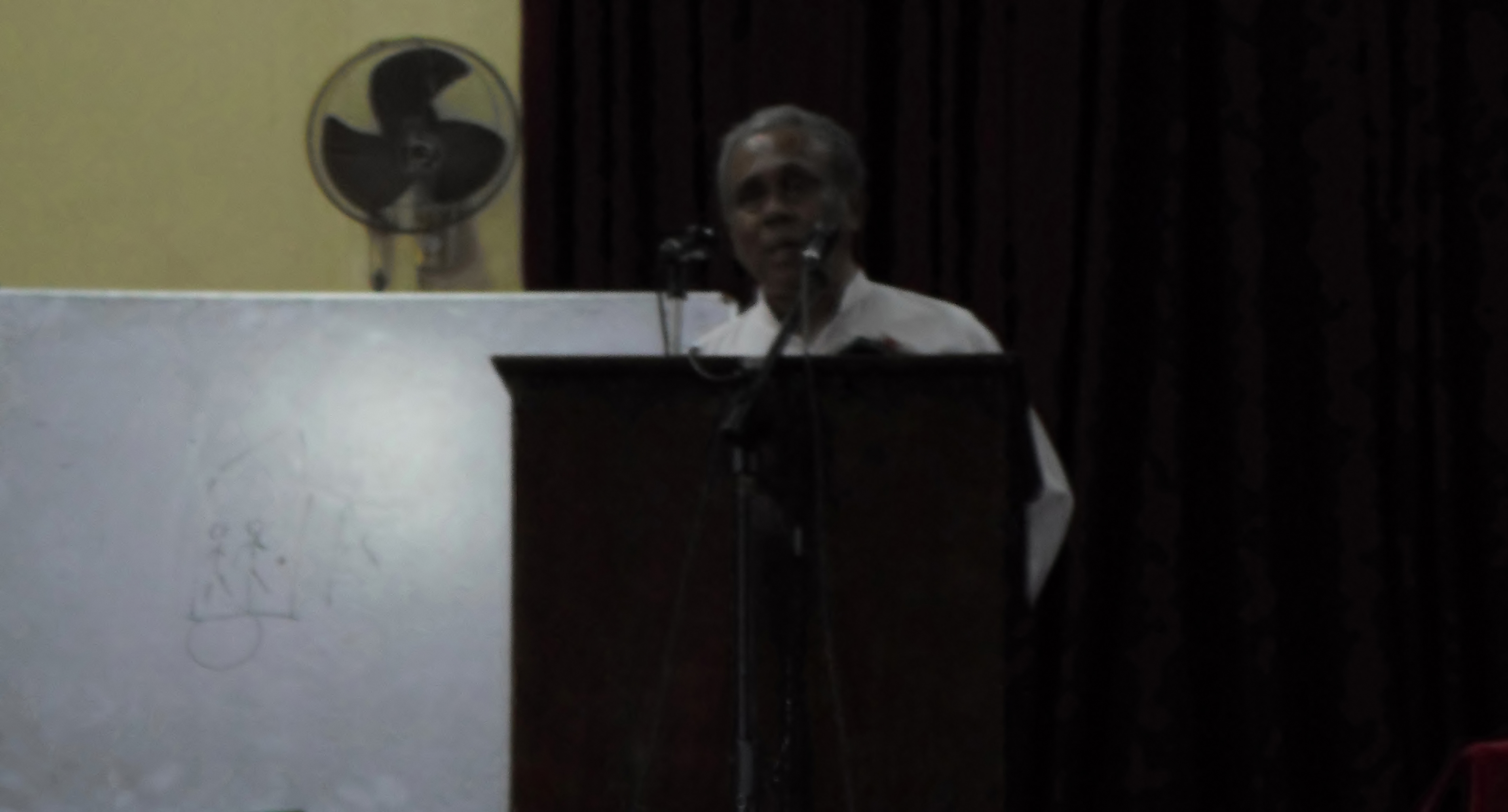
Professor Nalin de Silva in 2014.

=== Constructive relativism ===
Nalin de Silva was formally a member of the Marxist Trotskyist Lanka Sama Samaja Party and the Nava Sama Samaja Party, and as a Marxist studying both disciplines he intensively began to question the foundations of both Marxism and science. As a result, in 1986, he wrote Mage Lokaya (My World), criticising the basis of the established western system of knowledge, and its propagation, which he refers as "domination throughout the world". He explained in this book that mind independent reality is impossible and knowledge is not found but constructed.

This has further evolved into a study of epistemology and ontology, and in the process he has introduced and developed the concept of "constructive relativism" as the basis on which knowledge is constructed relative to the sense organs, culture and the mind completely based on Avidya. Though he was identified as a representative of "Jathika Chinthanaya" an idea proposed by Gunadasa Amarasekara based on national thought concept of Erich Fromm, Nalin de Silva's concept Chinthanaya is a different epistemological concept.

=== Vidyalankara interpretation ===
Vidyalankara interpretation was presented based on the theoretical and experimental work conducted by Dr. Nalin de Silva and his student Suraj Chandana at University of Kelaniya (Vidyalankara) in which Dr. de Silva rejects the wave nature of particles. According to him what gives rise to a bright and dark fringe pattern in the Young's double slit experiment is not the so called wave nature but the particle nature itself though not necessarily those of ordinary classical particles. Dr. de Silva theorises that each particle that hit the screen on a double slit experiment appears at both the slits simultaneously prior to reaching the screen. According to Janaka Wansapura, Ph.D. this is a paradigm shift in the knowledge of quantum nature.

=== Accelerating and decelerating Universe ===
Dr. Nalin de Silva has given a model for the universe with both acceleration and deceleration.

=== Arsenic controversy ===
The Rajarata chronic kidney disease (RCKD) has been an ailment prevalent in the North Central Province of Sri Lanka for several decades. In 2010 a team of scientists headed by Priyani Paranagama, head of the chemistry department at Kelaniya University, conducted a study to find the cause of the disease. The team was advised by Nalin de Silva, dean of the faculty of science, Kelaniya University. The team presented their findings in June 2011. They stated that they had found high concentrations of arsenic in drinking water, vegetation, rice and other samples in the region. The team, however, refused to release their data to the public, raising questions about their methodology. Their finding were followed by allegations that the arsenic was being introduced to the system through foreign pesticides and fertilizers.

As this statement caused a huge uproar in the agricultural sector in Sri Lanka, the Industrial Technology Institute stated that they had used Hydride Generation Atomic Absorption Spectrometry on rice samples which showed no high levels of arsenic. The ITI study also found that in samples of 28 different pesticides only 3 showed any signs of arsenic, and even then not in the concentrations that De Silva's team alleged. The Kelaniya University team stated that they had used new methods to locate the Arsenic in the samples they collected but did not feel a need to submit their findings for peer-review. De Silva stated that they did not publish their results in a "so-called peer reviewed journal due to our concern regarding the authorship of the paper as the original idea was given by 'samyak drshtika devivaru' also known as Devas.

When the authenticity of the findings made by the University of Kelaniya team were questioned by other scientists, De Silva stated that the god "Natha" had first told them about the arsenic through a mystic.

The merit (pina) in this regard should go to the "samyak drshtika devivaru" who first told that Arsenic is present in Rajarata drinking water and later revealed to us that Arsenic which is not found naturally in Sri Lanka has found its way to the wells and the wewas in Rajarata through Agrochemicals.

It's simply like this. We can see professors. Professors cannot see Arsenic. We cannot see gods. Gods can see Arsenic. I like this because there is certain symmetry in it... I know very well that the so-called objective scientific method is a lie.

Paranagama too has stood by De Silva and defended their methods. She said that they had first been told of the arsenic by the wife of "a university lecturer who had developed her mental faculties to communicate with a higher being", but then used scientific methods to deduce it.

The Sri Lanka Association for the Advancement of Science released a statement in July 2011 questioning the validity of the findings and the process and individuals involved in the study. Their statement laid the blame for the scandal firmly on Prof Nalin De Silva, and they called for other scientists and researchers in the group to distance themselves from De Silva to have their work taken seriously.

There is another serious issue which casts grave doubts on the credibility of the claims made by the Kelaniya group. The press has publicly identified as the leader of this group an individual, who despite holding a responsible position, professes a disdain for 'Western' science. He has publicly claimed supernatural revelations ('samyak drushtika devivaru') as the source of his group's information and even methods. While recognising that many scientists are deeply religious, the SLAAS wishes to state categorically that superstition and the supernatural have no place in science, and that scientific results inspired by such sources are highly suspect because of a probable bias on the part of the investigator. We also note that other researchers in the group have yet to distance themselves from the eccentric statements of their leader, and they need to do this if they wish to be taken seriously as scientists.

=== Western cultural dominance ===
De Silva was also a vocal opponent of what he calls western cultural dominance which he claimed is in its final phase.

The western Christian modernity (WCM) is in the last phase of its hegemony and is acting like an insane person. It has no respect for the sovereignty of the other countries as has been exemplified from invasions, killings and supporting so called rebel groups in the countries in Asia and Africa. The USA that became the leader of WCM after the so called second world war is trying desperately to hold to the hegemony of WCM. After more than five hundred years of world domination WCM will have to leave the planet without making the people suffer more and more.

De Silva also referred to linguist and philosopher Noam Chomsky as a puppet of the Western Christian Modernity.

The west also maintains people such as Chomsky who is not known to the average American in order to show to the world that there is freedom for the intellectuals to champion their views heard more by the rest of the world than by the Americans themselves.

=== Philosophy of science ===
De Silva, who was influenced by Paul Feyerabend, rejected the existence of scientific method and proposed proliferation of sciences on various chinthanayas.

De Silva proposed theories are stories constructed by abductive reasoning to explain phenomena.

De Silva refused ideas that science is truth or science is advancing towards the truth.

=== Sacking from University of Colombo ===
De Silva was sacked from the University of Colombo for engaging in unlawful political activity within the campus. In subsequent letters he has described the event.

When I was in the University of Colombo, not the best place to fight the cultural pentagon, I was asked by the then Vice Chancellor G. L. Peiris why I was teaching Jathika Chinthanaya to a captive audience. The audience was not that captive and had the backing of the Vice Chancellor and some members of the senior staff, and of course the cultural pentagon. Nothing happened to the captive audience but soon I found that I was out of the University system.

=== Veemansaka Parshadaya ===
In 2008 the Veemansaka Parshadaya, a student organisation where De Silva is the treasurer and mentor started a campaign to ban western clothing in Kelaniya University.

== Associations ==
Nalin de Silva was a member of the International Astronomical Union.

== Death ==
De Silva died on 1 May 2024 in Fremont, California, at the age of 79.

== Bibliography ==
- Mage Lokaya (My World)
- Ape Pravada (Our Theories)
- Parisaraya Ha Batahira Akalpa (Environment and Western Attitudes)
- Ape Pravada – 2 (Our Theories – 2)
- Jathiya Sanskruthiya Saha Chinthanaya (Nation, Culture and Chinthanaya), Maharagama, 1991 OCLC 27387252
- Bududahama Pavadeema (Buddhism Betrayed), Kelaniya, 1993 OCLC 32274198
- Apohakaye Roopikaya (Formalism of Dialectics)
- Marxvadaye Daridrathawaya (Poverty of Marxism)
- Prabhakaran Ohuge Seeyala Bappala (Prabhakaran and his relatives), Maharagama, 1995 OCLC 35151717
- An Introduction to Tamil Racism in Sri Lanka, Maharagama, 1997 OCLC 40331529 (English translation of the previous book)
- Nidahase Pahantemba (Beacon of Freedom)
- Nidahasa Dinaganeema (Winning Freedom Thyroideedom)
- Jathiye Iranama (Fate of the Nation)
- Sinhala Avurudda (Sinhala New Year)
- Vidya Kathandara (Stories of Science)
- Methivaranaya Ha Hamuduruwo (Elections and Bhikkus)

== See also ==
- Sri Lankan Non Career Diplomats
