= Anuradha Yahampath =

Sri Lankan textile designer and former governor of the Eastern Province, Sri Lanka

6th Governor of Eastern Province
- In office 4 December 2019 – 15 May 2023
- Preceded by: Shan Wijayalal De Silva
- Succeeded by: Senthil Thondaman

Personal details
- Education: Visakha Vidyalaya
- Alma mater: University of Leeds
- Occupation: exporter, textile designer, governor

Anuradha Yahampath (Sinhala: අනුරාධා යහම්පත්) is a Sri Lankan textile designer, exporter and former Governor of the Eastern Province of Sri Lanka. She is also the director of Kandys, a handloom brand in Sri Lanka and she is also the current chairperson of the National Entrepreneurs Association of Sri Lanka.

== Career ==
Yahampath is an alumnus of Visakha Vidyalaya and the University of Leeds where she completed her degree in Textile Design. She joined the popular handloom brand Kandygs, owned by her mother Sita Yahampath. In 2018, her contributions to export sector of the country were recognised by the Export Development Board and was awarded for the best innovative exporter.

On 4 December 2019, Yahampath was appointed as the governor of the Eastern Province, thus making her the first female governor of the Eastern Province. On 15 September 2023, Yahampath was removed from her post as governor by President Ranil Wickremesinghe, along with two other provincial governors, Northern Province Governor Jeevan Thiagarajah and Northwestern Province Governor Admiral of the Fleet Wasantha Karannagoda.
