= Gamini Fonseka =

Sri Lankan actor-politician (1931–2004)

Hon. Gamini Fonseka MP
- Gamini Fonseka

3rd Governor of the North Eastern Province
- In office 13 January 1995 – 20 October 1998
- President: Chandrika Kumaratunga
- Preceded by: Lionel Fernando
- Succeeded by: Asoka Jayawardena

Deputy Speaker of the Parliament of Sri Lanka
- In office 9 March 1989 – 24 June 1994
- President: Ranasinghe Premadasa; D. B. Wijetunga
- Prime Minister: D. B. Wijetunga; Ranil Wickremesinghe
- Preceded by: Norman Waidyaratne
- Succeeded by: Anil Moonesinghe

Member of Parliament for Matara District
- In office 9 March 1989 – 24 June 1994
- Majority: 19,618 preferential votes

Personal details
- Born: Sembuge Gamini Shelton Fonseka; 21 March 1936 Dehiwala, British Ceylon
- Died: 30 September 2004 (aged 68) Ja-Ela, Sri Lanka
- Party: United National Party
- Spouse: Dorothy Margaret Valancia (m. 1962)
- Domestic partner: Angela Seneviratne (1981-2004)
- Children: 6
- Education: S. Thomas' College, Mount Lavinia
- Occupation: Actor, film director, politician
- Known for: Cinema Sakwithi

Kala Keerthi Sembuge Gamini Shelton Fonseka (Sinhala: සෙම්බුගේ ගාමිණි ශෙල්ටන් ෆොන්සේකා; 21 March 1936 – 30 September 2004) was a Sri Lankan film actor, film director and politician. Often considered one of the greatest actors in Sinhala cinema, Fonseka dominated the industry in the 1960s and 1970s and won several Best Actor and Popular Actor awards throughout his career. Some critics and audiences regard Gamini Fonseka as the greatest actor in the Sri Lankan film industry, while others argue that title belongs to Joe Abeywickrama. Fonseka was the first to die among the three “crowned kings” of Sri Lankan cinema, followed by Joe Abeywickrama and then Tony Ranasinghe.

Apart from acting, he also served as the Deputy Speaker of the Parliament of Sri Lanka from 1989 to 1994 and the Governor of the North Eastern Province from 1995 to 1998. He also worked as a Director of the Capital Maharaja Group from 1998 to 2003.

Fonseka died on 30 September 2004 at the age of 68 at his residence in Ja-Ela.

== Early life ==
Fonseka was born on 21 March 1936 in Dehiwela as the third child of William and Daisy Fonseka. Starting school at a Presbyterian institution, he later transferred to S. Thomas' College, Mount Lavinia. As a child, he gained a reputation for imitating administrative figures at school. Foneska also prospered in the study of the Sinhala language and literature (under the guidance of D. S. Jayasekera, who is also reputed to have introduced him to acting in stage plays) and placed in the upper fourth for a Sinhala literature prize. The award for this achievement was presented to him by S. Thomas' graduate and Sri Lankan Prime Minister D. S. Senanayake. Foneska was also an accomplished cricket player.

== Film career ==
Fonseka abruptly ended his secondary education and dove into the film industry. He originally wanted to be a cameraman and in this line worked as the second Assistant Director on David Lean's The Bridge on the River Kwai (1957) and Lester James Peries' Rekava (1956). Fonseka was first on-screen in Rekava as part of a crowd. He also did some work on an English television series filmed in Sri Lanka.

Fonseka's first credited acting role was in Daiwa Yogaya (1959) in which he played a minor role. Lester James Peries' Sandesaya (1960) first established Fonseka in a leading role. With films like Adata Wediya Heta Hondai, Ranmuthu Duwa, Getawarayo, and Dheevarayo, Fonseka achieved popularity and became a box-office draw.

Seeking to not play in only commercial roles, Fonseka appeared as Jinadasa in the groundbreaking Gamperaliya (1964), working again with Peries. In Titus Thotawatte's Chandiya, Fonseka played his first anti-heroic role in Sri Lankan cinema and in Mike Wilson's Sorungeth Soru (1968), he played the role of Jamis Banda, the Sinhalese James Bond. In 1964, at the first awards ceremony of the United Ceylon Fan Club held on 12 January at the Royal College Hall, Colombo, Gamini won the Best Actor award in 1963 for his role as Jinadasa in the film Gamperaliya. This was Fonseka's first acting award.

Fonseka also tried out directing many accolades. His debut directorial work Parasathu Mal was warmly received. He directed a political satire Sagarayak Meda. Other films directed by Fonseka include Koti Waligaya and Nomiyana Minissu. He entered television as well and became the best teledrama actor for the role he played in Kalu Saha Sudu.

Fonseka's role as Willie Abeynayake in Nidhanaya (1972) and as ASP Wicrema Randeniya in Welikathara (1971) are widely considered to be his crowning achievements. Both films have been recognised by Presidential Awards as amongst the 10 Best Sri Lankan films of all time. In 1979, Fonseka played Jaffna Tamil clerk Nadarajah in Sunil Ariyaratne's Sarungale. He has also written some songs for the movies Sarungale (1979) and Mayurige Kathawa (1980).

== Political career ==
In 1989, Fonseka entered politics after joining the United National Party. He was elected to Parliament in 1989 as a representative of the Matara District with the highest number of preferential votes and was appointed Deputy Speaker of the Parliament of Sri Lanka. He was later appointed by President Chandrika Kumaratunga as Governor of the now-defunct Northeastern Province.

== Personal life ==
Fonseka married his longtime girlfriend Dorothy Margaret Valencia also known as "Tina" in 1962, and the couple had four children: Chamila, Thanuja, Dammith and Ishara. Many years later he fathered Kaushalya and Poornima with his partner Angela Seneviratne.

Through his 6 children, Fonseka has 13 grandchildren: Yasara, Vivek, Indula, Daniel, Tarik, Janik, Hrithik, Ruveka, Isuru, Tiasha. Aria, Tyrese and Hazel Fonseka remained married to Tina until his death in September 2004.

His son Damith was a popular film actor in 1990s. He acted in many commercially successful films such as Chandi Rejina, Ira Handa Illa, Chandiyage Putha, Cheriyo Darling, and Raththaran Malli.

== Awards ==
Year	Award	Film
1964	Best Actor	Gamperaliya
1965	Sarasaviya Best Actor Award	Deewarayo
1966	Popular Actor (Swarna Sanka)	–
1967	Sarasaviya Best Actor Award	Parasathu Mal
1967	Sarasaviya Most Popular Actor Award	–
1968	Sarasaviya Best Actor Award	Sorungeth Soru
1968	Sarasaviya Most Popular Actor Award	–
1969	Sarasaviya Most Popular Actor Award	–
1972	Popular Actor (Deepashika Award)	–
1976	Popular Actor	Kasthuri Suwanda (Sarasaviya Peoples Award) (He rejected this award)
1980	Sarasaviya Best Actor Award	Sarungale (The Best Lyricist award is being awarded to Prof. Sunil Ariyaratne for the song "Bambarindu" by mistake. But he corrected it and handed it over to Gamini Fonseka)
1980	Sarasaviya Most Popular Actor Award	–
1981	Sarasaviya Best Actor Award	Uthumaneni
1981	Sarasaviya Most Popular Actor Award	–
1982	Sarasaviya Best Director Award	Sagarayak Mada
1982	Sarasaviya Most Popular Actor Award	–
1986	Sarasaviya Best Actor Award	Yuganthaya
1986	Sarasawiya Rana Thisara Award	–
1986	Best Actor (President Awards)	Yuganthaya
1987	Reviewers Award	–
1995	Sarasaviya Best Actor Award	Nomiyena Minisun
1997	U.W Sumathipala Commemorating Award	–

== Filmography ==
Until his death, Fonseka acted in 102 films, 86 of them as a lead actor and 16 more as a supporting and guest appearance actor. He directed 10 films and produced 2 films.

=== As a director ===
- Parasathu Mal (1966)
- Uthumaneni (1980)
- Mayurige Kathawa (1980)
- Sagarayak Mada (1981)
- Bandura Mal (1981)
- Ra Manamali (1981)
- Sakwithi Suwaya (1982)
- Koti Waligaya (1986)
- Nomiyena Minisun (1994)
- Anthima Reya (1998)

=== As an actor ===
Year	Film	Role
1956	Rekava	Patient
1959	Daiwayogaya	Manamoola
1960	Sandesaya	Dhamitha
1960	Pirimiyek Nisa	
1962	Daskon	
1962	Ranmuthu Duwa	Bandu
1963	Gamperaliya	Jinadasa
1963	Adata Vediya Heta Hondai	Gamini
1964	Getawarayo	Jayasena Fernando
1964	Dheewarayo	Francis
1965	Chandiya	Chutte
1965	Sudo Sudu	Adiriyan
1965	Adarayai-Karunawai	
1965	Satha Panaha	Nimal
1965	Yatagiya Dawasa	
1966	Senasuma Kothanada	
1966	Seethala Wathura	
1966	Sigiri Kashyapa	Kashyapa
1966	Parasathu Mal	Bonny
1966	Oba Dutu Da	
1966	Sanasili Suvaya	
1967	Sorungeth Soru	James Banda
1967	Ipadune Aye	
1967	Rena Girawu	Disa
1967	Okkoma Hari	Sudantha, Aaron
1967	Sura Chauraya	Veera
1968	Dehadaka Duka	
1969	Oba Nethi Nam	
1969	Baduth Ekka Horu	
1969	Surayangeth Suraya	
1969	Paara Walalu	
1969	Mee Masso	
1970	Aathma Puja	
1970	Ohoma Hodada	Sirimal, Siri
1971	Hathara Denama Surayo	Podde
1971	Welikathara	ASP Randeniya
1972	Sahanaya	Piyal
1972	Nidhanaya	Willie Abeynayake
1972	Edath Suraya Adath Suraya	Gamini
1972	Adare Hithenawa Dakkama	Ricky
1972	Miringuva	
1973	Hondata Hondai	
1973	Sadahatama Oba Mage	
1973	Hodama Velava	
1973	Hodai Narakai	
1974	Kasthuri Suwanda	Kamal
1974	Onna Babo Billo Enawa	
1974	Sanakeliya	Priyantha
1975	Hitha Hoda Minihek	
1975	Raththaran Amma	
1975	Awa Soya Adare	Gamini
1975	Rajagedara Paraviyo	
1975	Cyril Malli	
1975	Suraya Surayamai	Gamini, Frank
1976	Kawuda Rajaa	Manuel
1976	Hulavali	Dhaara
1976	Nilla Soya	Dhamme
1976	Nayana	
1977	Yakadaya	Sumanadasa aka Yakadaya
1977	Chin Chin Nona	
1977	Deviyani Oba Koheda	Father Sebastian
1977	Chandi Putha	Gamini
1978	Chandi Shyama	
1978	Asha Daasin	Nalin
1978	Hitha Mithura	
1978	Apsara	
1978	Seetha Devi	Ravi Ranaraja aka Ravana
1979	Amal Biso	Bayisa
1979	Minisun Athara Minihek	Maithree
1979	Neelakadalin Orathile (Tamil film)	
1979	Sarungale	Nadarajah
1980	Mal Kekulu	Manjula
1980	Uthumaneni	Siripala
1980	Mayurige Kathawa	
1980	Sankapali	Sanka
1981	Chanchala Rekha	Sirisena
1981	Thavalama	
1981	Bandura Mal	Thirakotuwe Arachchi
1981	Ridee Thella	Podda
1981	Sagarayak Meda	Dr.Moladanda, Frederick Ramanayake
1982	Sakvithi Suvaya	Bucket Harry
1982	Miss Mallika	
1982	Hello Shyama	
1983	Yuganthaya	Simon Kabalana
1986	Yali Hamuvennai	
1986	Koti Waligaya	Police officer Sarath Ranasinghe
1986	Puja	A condemned
1987	Sathyagrahanaya	Minister
1987	Ahinsa	Himself
1987	Ottui Baruwata	
1989	Sebaliyo	
1989	Shakthiya Obai Amme	
1991	Uthura Dakuna	Ramanayake
1993	Sajant Nallathambi	Police chief
1994	Nomiyena Minisun	Colonel Ranabahu
1994	Shakthi	Police chief
1994	Pavana Raluviya	
1995	Mama Baya Ne Shyama	
1995	Demodara Palama	Chutte
1996	Loku Duwa	Marasinghe
1997	Apaye Thathpara Asu Haradahak	King Yama
1998	Anthima Reya	Linton Cooray

=== As a producer ===
Year	Film	Director
1967	Sorungeth Soru	Mike Wilson
1972	Sahanaya	J. Selvarathnam

Political offices
Preceded by Lionel Fernando	Governor of North Eastern Province; 1995–1998	Succeeded by Asoka Jayawardena
