= Tyronne Fernando =

Sri Lankan politician and lawyer (1941–2008)

Hon. Tyronne Fernando PC
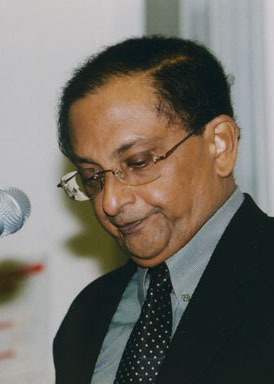
- Tyronne Fernando speaking at the London School of Economics

Minister of Foreign Affairs
- In office 2001–2004
- President: Chandrika Kumaratunga
- Prime Minister: Ranil Wickremesinghe
- Preceded by: Lakshman Kadirgamar
- Succeeded by: Lakshman Kadirgamar

5th Governor of North Eastern Province
- In office 2004–2006
- Preceded by: Asoka Jayawardena
- Succeeded by: Mohan Wijewickrama

Member of Parliament for Moratuwa
- In office 1977–1989
- Preceded by: Wimalasiri De Mel
- Succeeded by: Constituency abolished

Personal details
- Born: 8 August 1941 Ceylon
- Died: 26 February 2008 (aged 66) Colombo, Sri Lanka
- Party: United National Party
- Education: Keble College, Oxford, Royal College, Colombo
- Occupation: Politician and Diplomat
- Profession: Lawyer

Tyronne Fernando PC (Sinhala:ටිරොන් ෆර්නැන්ඩො; 8 August 1941 – 26 February 2008) was a Sri Lankan lawyer and politician who served as foreign minister from 2001 until 2004.

== Early life and education ==
Fernando was born on 8 August 1941. Fernando was a relation of Puran Appu. He attended Royal College, Colombo, and S. Thomas' College, Mount Lavinia, and earned his MA in political science at Keble College, Oxford. At Oxford he was the first Asian to be the chairman of the Labour Club. He also gained a diploma in journalism from the London School of Journalism. He entered Gray's Inn, London and was called to the Bar of England and Wales, as a barrister.

== Legal career ==
Returning to Ceylon, he became an advocate and started his legal practice in the unofficial bar. He then joined the Attorney-General's Department and worked as a Crown Counsel for period of ten years, before reverting to the unofficial bar and building a practice in criminal law for another 10 years. He was later appointed a President's Counsel and elevated to Master of the Bench Gray's Inn.

== Political career ==
In 1974, Fernando entered politics after he joined the United National Party. He was elected to Parliament in 1977 as a representative of the Moratuwa constituency, a stronghold of the Lanka Sama Samaja Party, he won with a record majority of 15,000. Fernando served as the Deputy Minister of Foreign Affairs during the presidency of J.R. Jayewardene. He also served as Minister of Information in 1993 during the presidency of Ranasinghe Premadasa. He also served as the head of Sri Lanka Cricket Board from 1991 until 1994.

In 2001, the new prime minister, Ranil Wickremesinghe appointed him to serve as Minister of Foreign Affairs. He served in this capacity until 2004. During his tenure, he sought the position of Secretary General of the United Nations.

Fernando resigned from the United National Party after the 2004 election, during which he lost his parliamentary seat. He was later appointed by President Chandrika Kumaratunga as Governor of the former North-East Province on 8 December 2004. He served as governor until January 2006.

Fernando died on 26 February 2008 at a private hospital in Colombo. At the time of his death, he was serving as a Senior advisor to President Mahinda Rajapaksa. Fernando had one child, Tehani Mathew.

Political offices
Preceded by Asoka Jayawardena	Governor of North Eastern Province; 2004–2006	Succeeded by Mohan Wijewickrama
Preceded by Lakshman Kadirgamar	Minister of Foreign Affairs of Sri Lanka; 2001–2004	Succeeded by Lakshman Kadirgamar
