= Austin Fernando =

Sri Lankan civil servant

Austin Fernando SLAS

Secretary to the President of Sri Lanka
- In office 1 July 2017 – 5 July 2018
- President: Maithripala Sirisena
- Preceded by: P. B. Abeykoon

2nd Governor of the Eastern Province
- In office 27 January 2015 – 1 July 2017
- Preceded by: Mohan Wijewickrama
- Succeeded by: Rohitha Bogollagama

Member of the Constitutional Council
- Incumbent
- Assumed office 23 January 2026

Personal details
- Education: University of Ceylon, Peradeniya
- Profession: Civil servant
- Ethnicity: Sinhalese

Kalupage Austin Fernando is a Sri Lankan civil servant and the current Sri Lankan High Commissioner to India. He had previously served as Secretary to the President of Sri Lanka, Defence Secretary, and Governor of the Eastern Province.

== Early life and education ==
Fernando was educated at Richmond College, Galle. After school, he joined the University of Ceylon, Peradeniya where he graduated with a B.A. degree. He later received an M.B.A. degree from the University of Sri Jayewardenepura.

== Career ==
Fernando taught at Nagoda Royal National College for a period of time before joining the Sri Lanka Administrative Service (SLAS). He was Government Agent for Polonnaruwa District and Nuwara Eliya District. He was later Commissioner of Cooperative Development and Postmaster General. He was then secretary at the Ministry of Rehabilitation and Ministry of Public Administration, Home Affairs, and Provincial Councils. He was a consultant to the United Nations before being appointed Defence Secretary in December 2001.

Newly elected President Maithripala Sirisena appointed Fernando as a presidential adviser on 15 January 2015. He was thereafter appointed Governor of the Eastern Province on 27 January 2015. He resigned in order to become Secretary to the President of Sri Lanka on 1 July 2017 which he held till 5 July 2018. Fernando was appointed to the Constitutional Council in 2026.

== Writings ==
Fernando is the author of My Belly is White: Reminiscences of a Peacetime Secretary of Defence.

== See also ==
- List of Sri Lankan non-career diplomats

Political offices
Preceded by Mohan Wijewickrama	Governor of Eastern Province; 2015–2017	Succeeded by Rohitha Bogollagama
