= Jayantha Lal Ratnasekera =

Sri Lankan academic

Professor Jayantha Lal Ratnasekera

Governor of the Eastern Province
- Incumbent
- Assumed office 25 September 2024
- Preceded by: Senthil Thondaman

Vice Chancellor of Uva Wellassa University
- In office February 2017 – November 2023

Personal details
- Born: November 1962 (age 63–64) Trincomalee, Sri Lanka
- Spouse: Mallika Ratnasekera
- Children: 1
- Education: Nalanda College, Colombo Peoples' Friendship University of Russia
- Profession: Professor in Chemistry

Professor Jayantha Lal Ratnasekera (born November 1962) is a Sri Lankan academic currently serving as the Governor of the Eastern Province of Sri Lanka. He previously served as Vice Chancellor of Uva Wellassa University from February 2017 to November 2023.

== Early life ==
Ratnasekera received his primary education at Agrabodhi Vidyalaya in Kanthale, and his secondary education at Nalanda College, Colombo. He graduated from Peoples' Friendship University of Russia with an honors degree in chemistry in 1988. He would then go on to receive his PhD in Chemistry from the same university in 1993.

== Career ==
Ratnasekera joined Rajarata University of Sri Lanka as a senior lecturer in August 1996, and was promoted to professor in Chemistry in 2018. He served as Head of the Department of Physical Sciences from 1996 to 1999, and as Dean of Faculty of Applied Sciences from 1999 to 2005.

Ratnasekera was appointed to the post of Vice Chancellor of Uva Wellassa University in January 2017. He served as the Chair of the Committee of Vice Chancellors & Directors (CVCD) in 2021.

His research interests are in renewable energy sources, environmental chemistry, theoretical chemistry, quality assurance in higher education, and science education. Ratnasekera has been a trainer and a resource in numerous training programs and workshops. He is also a freelance journalist, author and translator.
