= Bulathgama =

Bulathgama was a vast area in the highlands of Sri Lanka which, due to its fertile lands and high income, was directly kept under the King.

Nobles of the same name administered the province in the name of the King.

== Illustrious sons of Bulathgama ==
Bulathgama Wijayasinghe Weerakoon Maha Dissawe was one of the descendants of this clan who was a provincial administrator under the British in the 1850s.

His son was ordained as a Buddhist monk in Siyam Nikaya in Kandy, Sri Lanka, taking the name Ven. Bulathgama Dhammalankara Sri Sumanatissa. Feeling that the caste system was practised by the order, he left Kandy and relocated to Galle, in the southern province, where he established a dhamma school known as"Vijayananda Pirivena". He was to greet Col. Henry Steel Olcott and Mrs Helena Blavatsky, founders of the Theosophical Society, when they arrived at Galle Harbour. Thereafter Col. Olcott and Mrs Blavatsky took pansil (the "five precepts" or basic rules to be followed by a Buddhist) from the Ven. Bulathgama Nayaka Thero and "officially" became Buddhists (as in the official Olcott Diaries).

Ven. Bulathgama Thero also built a Buddhist vihara at Giniwella, Kathaluwa, where the printing press used to print the first Ceylonese newspaper, "Lankalokaya", may be seen.
