= List of governors of Eastern Province =

Governor of Eastern Province
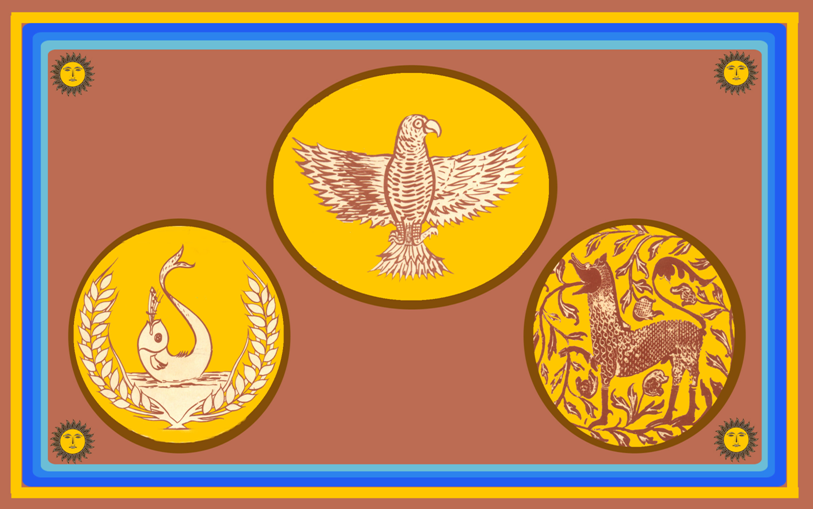
- Flag of Eastern Province
- Incumbent; Jayantha Lal Ratnasekera since 25 September 2024
- Appointer: President of Sri Lanka
- Term length: 5 years
- Precursor: Governor of the North Eastern Province
- Inaugural holder: Mohan Wijewickrama
- Formation: 22 December 2006
- Website: ep.gov.lk

The governor of the Eastern Province, Sri Lanka (Sinhala: නැගෙනහිර පළාත් ආණ්ඩුකාරවරයා Nægenahira palāth āndukāravarayā), is the head of the provincial government and exercises executive power over subjects devolved to the Eastern Provincial Council. The governor is appointed by the president of Sri Lanka for a period of five years. The current governor is Jayantha Lal Ratnasekera.

== Governors ==
Parties

Independent Sri Lanka Freedom Party United People's Freedom Alliance Sri Lanka Podujana Peramuna Ceylon Workers' Congress

No.	Name	Portrait	Party	Took office	Left office	Refs
1	Mohan Wijewickrama		Independent	22 December 2006	January 2015	
2	Austin Fernando		Independent	27 January 2015	1 July 2017	
3	Rohitha Bogollagama		Sri Lanka Freedom Party	4 July 2017	3 January 2019	
4	M. L. A. M. Hizbullah		United People's Freedom Alliance	3 January 2019	3 June 2019	
5	Shan Wijayalal De Silva		Sri Lanka Freedom Party	5 June 2019	20 November 2019	
6	Anuradha Yahampath		Sri Lanka Podujana Peramuna	4 December 2019	15 May 2023	
7	Senthil Thondaman		Ceylon Workers' Congress	17 May 2023	23 September 2024	
8	Jayantha Lal Ratnasekera		Independent	25 September 2024	Incumbent	
