= Mohan Wijewickrama =

Vice Admiral Mohan Wijewickrama RSP, VSV, USP

1st Governor of Eastern Province
- In office 1 January 2007 – 29 January 2015
- Preceded by: Office created
- Succeeded by: Austin Fernando

Acting Governor of Northern Province
- In office 1 January 2007 – 3 July 2008
- Preceded by: Office created
- Succeeded by: Victor Perera

6th Governor of North Eastern Province
- In office 21 January 2006 – 31 December 2006
- Preceded by: Tyronne Fernando
- Succeeded by: Office abolished

Personal details
- Born: 12 June 1953 (age 73) Colombo, Dominion of Ceylon
- Spouse: Nishani Wijewickrama
- Children: a son Chatura and daughter Ranmali
- Education: Thurstan College

Military service
- Allegiance: Sri Lanka
- Branch/service: Sri Lanka Navy
- Years of service: 1971 - 2005
- Rank: Vice Admiral
- Commands: Chief of Staff of Sri Lanka Navy, Deputy Area Commander Northern Naval Area; Deputy Area Commander Western Naval Area; Commander Southern Naval Area; Commander Eastern Naval Area
- Battles/wars: Sri Lankan Civil War
- Awards: Rana Sura Padakkama; Vishista Seva Vibhushanaya; Uttama Seva Padakkama; Sri Lanka Armed Services Long Service Medal; Sri Lanka Armed Services Long Service Medal; Riviresa Campaign Services Medal

Vice Admiral Mohan Wijewickrama, RSP, VSV, USP (born 12 June 1953) is a former Sri Lankan senior naval officer turned politician. He served as the Chief of Staff of the Sri Lanka Navy from 2001 to 2005. He was appointed Governor of North Eastern Province from 2006 to 2007 and Governor of Eastern Province from 2007 to 2015, while serving as acting Governor of Northern Province. He is a former High Commissioner of Sri Lanka to Pakistan .

== Education ==
Wijewickrama was educated at Thurstan College in Colombo.

== Naval career ==
After completing his education, he joined the Sri Lanka Navy on 1 August 1971. During his career in the Navy he served as the Deputy Commander, Western Naval Area (1993–1995); Deputy Commander, Northern Naval Area (1995–1996); Commander, Southern Naval Area (1996–1998); Commander, Eastern Naval Area (1998–2000); Commander, Northern Naval Area (2000–2001). From 2001 to 2005 he functioned as the Chief of Staff of the Sri Lanka Navy. He retired from the service in 2005 with the rank of Rear Admiral, when he was overlooked for the position of the Commander of the Navy by then president Chandrika Kumaratunga. In 2019 President Maithripala Sirisena corrected the injustice that occurred to him in 2005, by bestowing him with the rank of Vice Admiral from the date of retirement.

== Political career ==
Wijewickrama was appointed Governor of North Eastern Province on 21 January 2006, by President Mahinda Rajapaksa. With the de-merger of the two Provinces, he was appointed the Governor of the Eastern Province in December 2006, the appointment he held till the election defeat of President Rajapaksa in 2015. He was appointed co-chair of the District Development Committees (DDC) for Ampare, Batticaloa and Trincomalee. He was an active member of Viyathmaga a professional organisation that supported President Gotabaya Rajapaksa's presidential campaign in 2019. He was appointed Sri Lankan High Commissioner to Pakistan from June 2020 to June 2023.

== Awards ==
His awards and decorations include the Medals; Rana Sura Padakkama (RSP), Vishista Seva Vibhushanaya (VSV), Uttama Seva Padakkama (USP), Sri Lanka Armed Services Long Service Medal, Riviresa Campaign Services Medal and Republic of Sri Lanka Armed Services Medal.

== Family ==
Wijewickrama is married to Nishani. They have a son and a daughter.

Political offices
Preceded by Tyronne Fernando	Governor of North Eastern Province; 2006	Succeeded by Office abolished
Preceded by Office created	Governor of Northern Province (Acting); 2007–2008	Succeeded by Victor Perera
Preceded by Office created	Governor of Eastern Province; 2007–2015	Succeeded by Austin Fernando
