= Lionel Fernando =

Sri Lankan civil servant (1936–2024

Sri Lankan Ambassador to France
- In office 17 November 2008 – 2010
- President: Mahinda Rajapaksa
- Preceded by: Chithranganee Wagiswara
- Succeeded by: Dayan Jayatilleka

Sri Lankan Ambassador to the Netherlands
- President: Mahinda Rajapaksa

2nd Governor of North Eastern Province
- In office 30 November 1993 – 23 August 1994
- President: D. B. Wijetunga
- Preceded by: Nalin Seneviratne
- Succeeded by: Gamini Fonseka

Personal details
- Born: 17 February 1936
- Died: 6 July 2024 (aged 88) Colombo, Sri Lanka
- Education: St Sylvester's College, Kandy

M. E. Lionel Fernando (17 February 1936 – 6 July 2024) was a Sri Lankan civil servant and diplomat. He held the offices of Secretary to the Ministry of Media, Tourism and Aviation, Secretary to the Foreign Ministry, Sri Lankan Ambassador to the Netherlands, Sri Lankan Ambassador to France, Sri Lankan High Commissioner to Malaysia and Governor of the North Eastern Province.

He was the first Sinhala Government Agent in Jaffna and later held numerous positions in the public service. Fernando was also Secretary to the Ministry of Civil Defence and Commissioner General of Rehabilitation and Essential Services. He was also the chairman of the Executive Council of the Organization for the Prohibition of the Chemical Weapons (OPCW) associated to the UNO, and Chairperson Sri Lanka Rupavahini Corporation.

Fernando died in Colombo on 6 July 2024, at the age of 88.

== See also ==
- List of Sri Lankan non-career diplomats

Political offices
Preceded by Nalin Seneviratne	Governor of North Eastern Province; 1993–1994	Succeeded by Gamini Fonseka
Diplomatic posts
Preceded by Chithranganee Wagiswara	Sri Lankan Ambassador to France; 2009–2010	Incumbent
Preceded by ?	Sri Lankan Ambassador to the Netherlands ?	Succeeded by ?
