= List of governors of North Eastern Province =

Governor of North Eastern Province
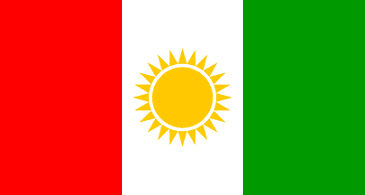
- Flag of North Eastern Province, later adapted to that of the Northern Province
- Appointer: President of Sri Lanka
- Inaugural holder: Nalin Seneviratne
- Formation: 30 November 1988
- Final holder: Mohan Wijewickrama
- Abolished: 31 December 2006

The Governor of the North Eastern Province, Sri Lanka (Sinhala: උතුරු සහ නැගෙනහිර පළාත් ආණ්ඩුකාරවරයා Uthuru saha Nægenahira palāth āndukāravarayā) was responsible for the management of the North Eastern Provincial Council, its key functions including exercising powers vested in the Governor by the Provincial Council Act No. 42 of 1987 amended by Act No. 28 of 1990 and the 13th Amendment to the Constitution. The position was abolished in December 2006 with the demerger of the Northern and Eastern Provinces.

== Governors ==
Independent Sri Lanka Freedom Party United National Party

No.	Name	Portrait	Party	Took office	Left office	Refs
1	Lieutenant General Nalin Seneviratne		Independent	30 November 1988	30 November 1993	
2	Lionel Fernando		Independent	30 November 1993	23 August 1994	
3	Gamini Fonseka		United National Party	13 January 1995	20 October 1998	
4	Major General Asoka Jayawardena		Independent	13 November 1998	30 November 2004	
5	Tyronne Fernando		United National Party	6 December 2004	20 January 2006	
6	Rear Admiral Mohan Wijewickrama		Independent	21 January 2006	31 December 2006	

== See also ==
- Chief minister (Sri Lanka)
