= Sachith Aloka =

Sri Lankan international footballer

Personal information
- Date of birth: 5 June 1990 (age 36)
- Place of birth: Sri Lanka
- Position: Forward

International career^{‡}
Years	Team	Apps	(Gls)
2013–	Sri Lanka	2	(0)
- ‡ National team caps and goals as of 26 July 2013

Sachith Aloka is a Sri Lankan international footballer who plays as a forward.
