= Ceylon Democratic Unity Alliance =

- Leader: T. V. Chennan
- Secretary: S. Sathasivam
- Founded: 2002
- Split from: Ceylon Workers' Congress
- Headquarters: 17 Bloomfield Road, Nuwara Eliya

Election symbol
- Fish

Ceylon Democratic Unity Alliance is a political party based amongst plantation Tamils in Sri Lanka. The party was founded ahead of the 2002 municipal elections. Then the party got around 13 500 votes.

In the 2004 general elections the party polled 10,736 votes (0.12% of the nationwide vote).

The party is led by T.V. Chennan.
