= Sachith Peiris =

- Born: October 4, 1986 (age 40); Colombo, Sri Lanka
- Genres: World music, Rnb, hip hop, pop, folk, film score
- Occupations: Music producer, Video Director, playback singer, programmer, recording engineer
- Years active: 2005—present
- Label: Five Frogs Entertainment
- Website: Official website

Sachith Peiris (Sinhala: සචිත් පීරිස්; born October 4, 1986) is a Sri Lankan award-winning music director, playback singer and a video director.

== Career ==
Peiris's career began in 2005. His first chart-topping hit song, "Namal Mitak" sung by Randhir Witana, became a new hope for the Sri Lankan music industry.

Peiris joined SaReGaMa Productions in 2005 and became its CEO, making it the number one music production house in the country.

== Awards ==
His work has been nominated for several national and international awards.

- Sumathi Sammana 2011 - Gold award for Lanwa Steel Corporation TVC in the best commercial category
- Effies Awards - Pass it On When Your Done with It silver award (Sri Lanka Eye Donation awareness video )
- 7+ 2009 - Best TVC for Mobitel Kiri Ammawaru (chosen among 100,000 commercials worldwide)
- Spikes Singapore 2009 - Finalist - Mobitel Kiri Ammawaru Sumathi Sammana 2009 - Gold for Mobitel Kin Ammawaru Reggies 2007 - Best Original Composition for Hilton Kottu Song
- Chillies 2009 - Silver Award for best TV commercial for Mobitel Kiri Ammawaru
- Chillies 2008 Bronze Award for best TV commercial for Mobitel Thematic

== Music productions and songs ==
He had the chance of working closely with Hariharan with his projects, "Jathika Govi Geethaya" written by Wasantha Dukgannarala and sung by many senior Sri Lankan artists such as Bathiya and Santhush, Iraj Weeraratne, Nirosha Virajini, Athula Adhikari, Rohana Beddage, Wasantha Dukgannarala and Gayantha with Sachith.

Sachith's commercial music productions:

- South Asian Beach Games 2011 theme song
- Hiru Fm, Y Fm, Sooriyan Fm, Neth Fm and V Fm station jingles
- Ceat Cricket Awards 2010 theme song
- Sirasa TV One Nation One Cup World Cup song
- Swarnawahini Mega Star theme song
- Re Mix Song (Rani Mukherji) - Sachith
- Govi Geethaya
- Namal Mitak - Randhir Withana
- Madu Suwandak - Umara and Sachith
- Sihine - Prathap, Shamir and Sachith
- Parana Nadagam - Sachith ft. Umara
