= Rohitha Bogollagama =

Sri Lankan politician

Hon. Rohitha Bogollagama
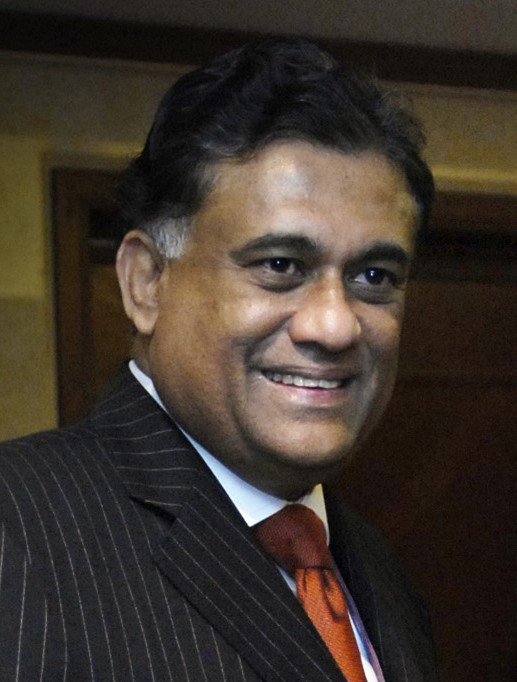
- Rohitha Bogollagama at the Shangri-La Dialogue in 2007

Sri Lankan High Commissioner to the United Kingdom
- In office 20 November 2023 – 2 November 2024
- President: Ranil Wickremesinghe; Anura Kumara Dissanayake
- Preceded by: Saroja Sirisena
- Succeeded by: Nimal Senadheera

Governor of Eastern Province
- In office 4 July 2017 – 31 December 2018
- President: Maithripala Sirisena
- Preceded by: Austin Fernando
- Succeeded by: M. L. A. M. Hizbullah

Minister of Foreign Affairs
- In office 28 January 2007 – 23 April 2010
- President: Mahinda Rajapaksa
- Prime Minister: Ratnasiri Wickremanayake
- Preceded by: Mangala Samaraweera
- Succeeded by: G. L. Peiris

Minister of Enterprise Development and Investment Promotion
- In office 23 November 2005 – 28 January 2007
- President: Mahinda Rajapaksa
- Prime Minister: Ratnasiri Wickremanayake
- Succeeded by: Sarath Amunugama

Minister of Advanced Technology and National Enterprise
- In office 18 November 2004 – 23 November 2005
- President: Chandrika Kumaratunga
- Prime Minister: Mahinda Rajapaksa

Minister of Industries of Sri Lanka
- In office 12 December 2001 – 12 February 2004
- President: Chandrika Kumaratunga
- Prime Minister: Ranil Wickremesinghe
- Succeeded by: Anura Bandaranaike

Personal details
- Born: 6 August 1954 (age 72) Nikaweratiya, North Western Province, Sri Lanka
- Party: Sri Lanka Freedom Party (2004 – Present); United National Party (2000 – 2004)
- Spouse(s): Deepthi Bogollagama (née Samarakone)
- Children: Dhakshitha, Dilshani
- Education: Ananda College, Colombo; Sri Lanka Law College
- Profession: Lawyer

Chandrasekera Rohitha Bandara Bogollagama (born 6 August 1954) (known as Rohitha Bogollagama) (Sinhala: රෝහිත බෝගොල්ලාගම, Tamil: ரோகித போகோல்லாகம) is a Sri Lankan lawyer and politician. He is a former Governor of Eastern Province, having earlier served as the Cabinet Minister of Foreign Affairs from 28 January 2007 until he was defeated in the General Elections held on 8 April 2010, losing his seat in parliament.

He had a long career in law, from 1976 to 1999, before being elected to the Sri Lankan parliament in 2000 from the United National Party, and then crossed over to Sri Lanka Freedom Party, serving as the chief organiser for the Kotte Electorate.

As of 2025, Bogollagama was indicted in Sri Lanka on corruption charges related to his tenure as Investment Promotion Minister.

== Early life ==
Born in Nikaweratiya, North Western Province, to Chandrasekera Malala Banda Bogollagama (former Chairman, National Lotteries Board from 1966 to 1970) and Vinitha Bogollagama (née Senerath), he is one of their five children. Bogollagama attended Ananda College in Colombo and later the Sri Lanka Law College, passing out in 1976. He was called to the Bar and enrolled as Attorney-at-Law by the Supreme Court of Sri Lanka in October 1976.

== Legal career ==
Bogollagama's career in law ran for nearly thirty years, and included serving as legal consultant to the Ceylon Fertiliser Corporation from 1985 to 1993, and legal advisor to the United States government-run Voice of America from 1991 to 1999. He was also Chairman of the Sri Lanka Cement Corporation and Chairman and Director General of the Board of Investment of Sri Lanka.

== Political career ==
As a member of the United National Party, Bogollagama was elected to parliament in 2000 for Kurunegala District, and served the Parliamentary Consultative Committees on Finance, Foreign Affairs, Defence, Industrial Development & Investment Promotion, and Power & Energy. On 12 December 2001, Prime Minister Ranil Wickremesinghe appointed him Minister of Industries. As minister he initiated the "Yuga Dekma", a large industrial fair, in 2002. In 2004 president Chandrika Kumaratunga dissolved parliament and removed non-cabinet ministers on 12 February.

While in opposition in 2004, he was appointed by a unanimous decision to serve as the Chairman of the Committee on Public Enterprises (COPE), an oversight committee of parliament responsible for accountability of public enterprises.

Bogollagama switched political allegiance on 18 November 2004, siding with the United People's Freedom Alliance; the President swore him in as the Cabinet Minister of Advanced Technology and National Enterprise Development on the same day.

He became the Minister of Enterprise and Development on 23 November 2005. As Minister, he argued in favour of returning Sri Lanka to GMT +05:30 time, which was the official time before 1996. He represented the government of Sri Lanka at two rounds of peace talks with the LTTE at Geneva in 2006.

He was defeated in the general election held on 8 April 2010, losing his seat in parliament and was not reappointed to cabinet.

He was appointed Governor of Eastern Province by President Maithripala Sirisena in July 2017 and served till 2018.

== Later life ==
He was appointed as the Sri Lankan High Commissioner-designate to the UK by President Ranil Wickremesinghe in October 2023. Bogollagama attended the 2023 UN peacekeeping ministerial meeting in Accra, Ghana in December 2023 as the special representative of President Ranil Wickremesinghe. His entourage which included his wife, a military aid, his use of the Sri Lankan Ambassador to Ethiopia and other spending has drawn criticism in the Sri Lankan press given that he is spending taxpayer money during a time when Sri Lanka is in its worst economic crisis.

== Corruption charges ==
In October 2024, a probe was launched into Bogollagama and his claimed expenses as High Commissioner to the UK. In April 2025, Bogollagama reportedly became the subject of British criminal investigations over allegation during the civil war, immigration fraud, and financial misconduct. Complaints from human rights groups link him to civilian deaths during Sri Lanka’s civil war and to irregularities involving a 2019 unauthorized jet landing. His diplomatic immunity expired in 2022, and UK authorities are examining possible violations of immigration and tax laws, as well as undisclosed legal issues involving his family.

In August 2025, the Colombo High Court ruled that Bogollagama will be tried in absentia on corruption charges dating back to 2006. Accused of misusing public funds during a London investment event while serving as Investment Promotion Minister, Bogollagama has lived in self-imposed exile in the UK since 2022 and has not returned to face trial. The case, filed by Sri Lanka’s bribery commission (CIABOC) in 2015, alleges violations of the Bribery Act involving over Rs. 1.5 million in unauthorized expenses. The trial is set to begin on 30 October 2025. His immigration status in the UK remains unclear, and civil society groups are urging international cooperation.

== Family ==
He is married to Deepthi Samarakone, youngest daughter of Donald Samarakone of the Ceylon Civil Service and Srima Samarakone daughter of Mudliyar A. V. Rathnayake. He has three sisters Kusum, Sucharitha and Jayathri. He has a son and a daughter. (ex Chairman of the National Enterprise Development Authority)

== See also ==
- Minister of Foreign Affairs of Sri Lanka
- Sri Lankan Non Career Diplomats

Political offices
Preceded by ?	Minister of Industries of Sri Lanka; 12 December 2001–12 February 2004	Succeeded by Anura Bandaranaike
Preceded by ?	Minister of Enterprise Development and Investment Promotion of Sri Lanka; 23 November 2005–28 January 2007	Succeeded by Sarath Amunugama
Preceded by Mangala Samaraweera	Minister of Foreign Affairs of Sri Lanka; 28 January 2007–8 April 2010	Succeeded by Prof. G. L. Peiris
Preceded by Austin Fernando	Governor of Eastern Province; 2017–2018	Succeeded by M. L. A. M. Hizbullah
