= Provinces of Sri Lanka =

First-level administrative divisions of Sri Lanka

Province පළාත (Sinhala) மாகாணம் (Tamil)
- Category: First level administrative division
- Location: Sri Lanka
- Created: 1 October 1833
- Number: 9
- Populations: 1,061,315–5,851,130
- Areas: 3,684–10,472 km^{2}
- Government: Provincial council
- Subdivisions: District

Provinces (Sinhala: පළාත, romanized: Paḷāta; Tamil: மாகாணம், romanized: Mākāṇam) are the first level administrative divisions of Sri Lanka. Currently, Sri Lanka is divided into 9 provinces. Each province is further divided into districts, which are further divided into divisional secretariats.

The provinces were first established by the British rulers of Ceylon in 1833. Over the next century, most of the administrative functions of the provinces were transferred to the districts, the second level administrative division of the country. By the middle of the 20th century, the provinces had become mostly ceremonial. This changed in 1987 when, following several decades of increasing demand for decentralization, the 13th Amendment to the 1978 Constitution of Sri Lanka established provincial councils.

== History ==
=== Kingdom of Kandy ===
Kandyan Provinces in 1815

The Kandyan kingdom was divided into 21 provinces, 12 Disavanis and 9 Ratas. Ratas were smaller administrative divisions in close proximity to the central government and governed by a Rate Mahatmaya, while Disavanis were larger, further away and governed by a Dissava (governor), acting as a representative of the king. Each disavani and rata was divided into Korales and the Korales in turn were divided into Pattu (singular, pattuva). Each pattuva consisted of a large number of villages which varied in extant and composition.

Each Disavani was entitled to have a distinct flag and each Disava was preceded by his particular flag while he was travelling in his disavani symbolizing their power and authority. Rate Mahatmaya had vastly lessor power and authority including that of not having the right to a flag.

=== British Ceylon ===
After the British took control of the entire island of Ceylon in 1815, it was divided into three ethnic-based administrative structures: Low Country Sinhalese, Kandyan Sinhalese and Tamil. In 1829, the British established the Colebrooke–Cameron Commission to review the colonial government of Ceylon, including its administrative structures. The commission recommended that the existing three ethnic based administrations be unified into a single administration divided into five geographic provinces. Accordingly, on 1 October 1833, five provinces under one administration came into being:

- Central Province – composed of the central Kandyan Provinces.
- Eastern Province – composed of the maritime districts of Batticaloa and Trincomalee, and the Kandyan provinces of Bintenna and Tamankaduwa.
- Northern Province – composed of the maritime districts of Jaffna, Mannar and Vanni, and the Kandyan province of Nuwara Kalawiya.
- Southern Province – composed of the maritime districts of Galle, Hambantota, Matara and Tangalle, and the Kandyan provinces of Lower Uva, Saffragam and Wellassa.
- Western Province – composed of the maritime districts of Colombo, Chilaw and Puttalam, and the Kandyan provinces of Three Korales, Four Korales, Seven Korales and Lower Bulathgama.

Over the next fifty years, four additional provinces were created, bringing the total number up to nine:

- North Western Province – created in 1845 from northern parts of the Western Province (districts of Chilaw, Puttalam and Seven Korales).
- North Central Province – created in 1873 from southern parts of the Northern Province (district of Nuwara Kalawiya) and north western parts of the Eastern Province (district of Tamankaduwa).
- Uva Province – created in 1886 from parts of the Central Province, Eastern Province (district of Bintenna) and Southern Province (district of Wellassa).
- Sabaragamuwa Province – created in 1889.
Evolution of Sri Lankan provinces since 1833
1833–1845

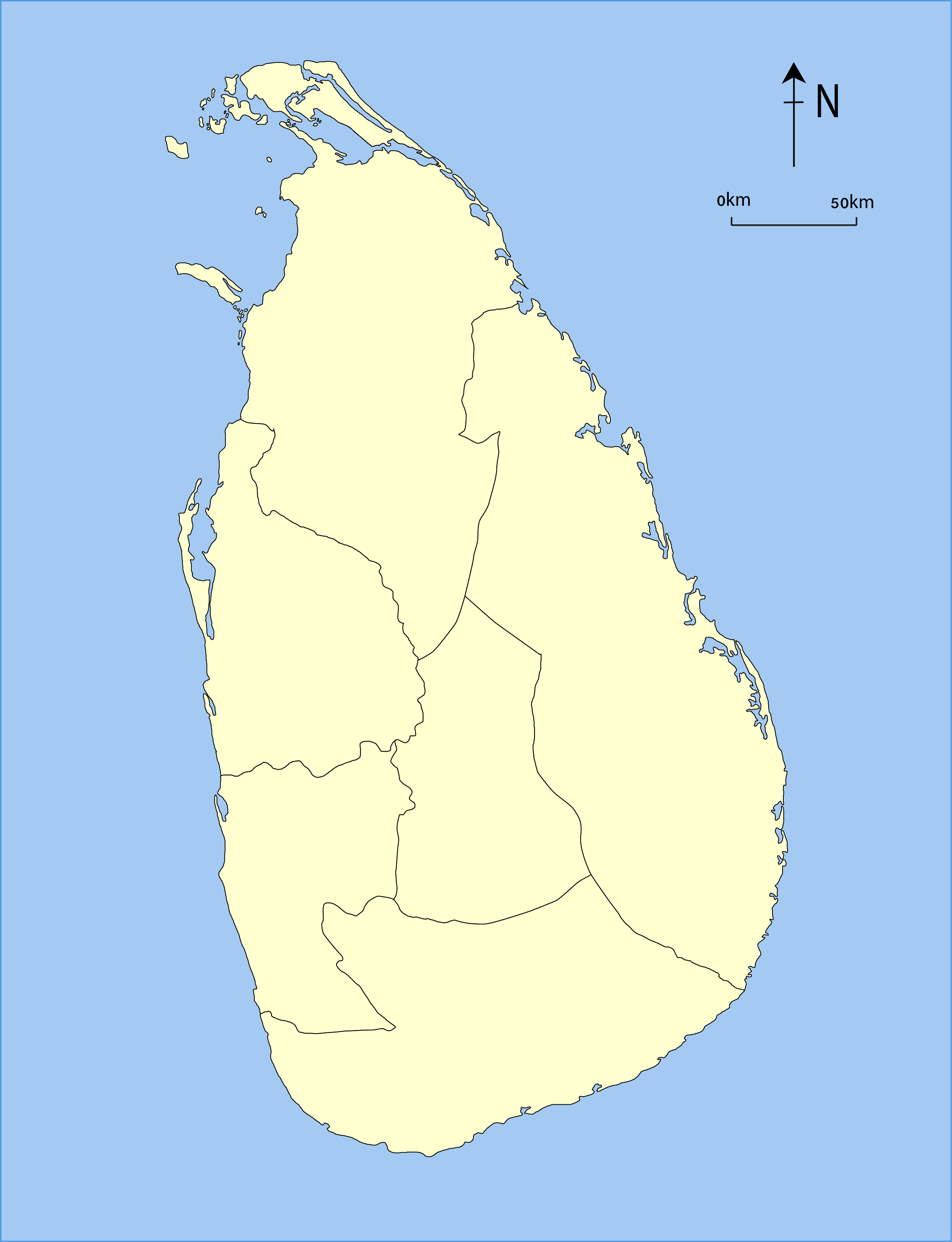
1845–1873

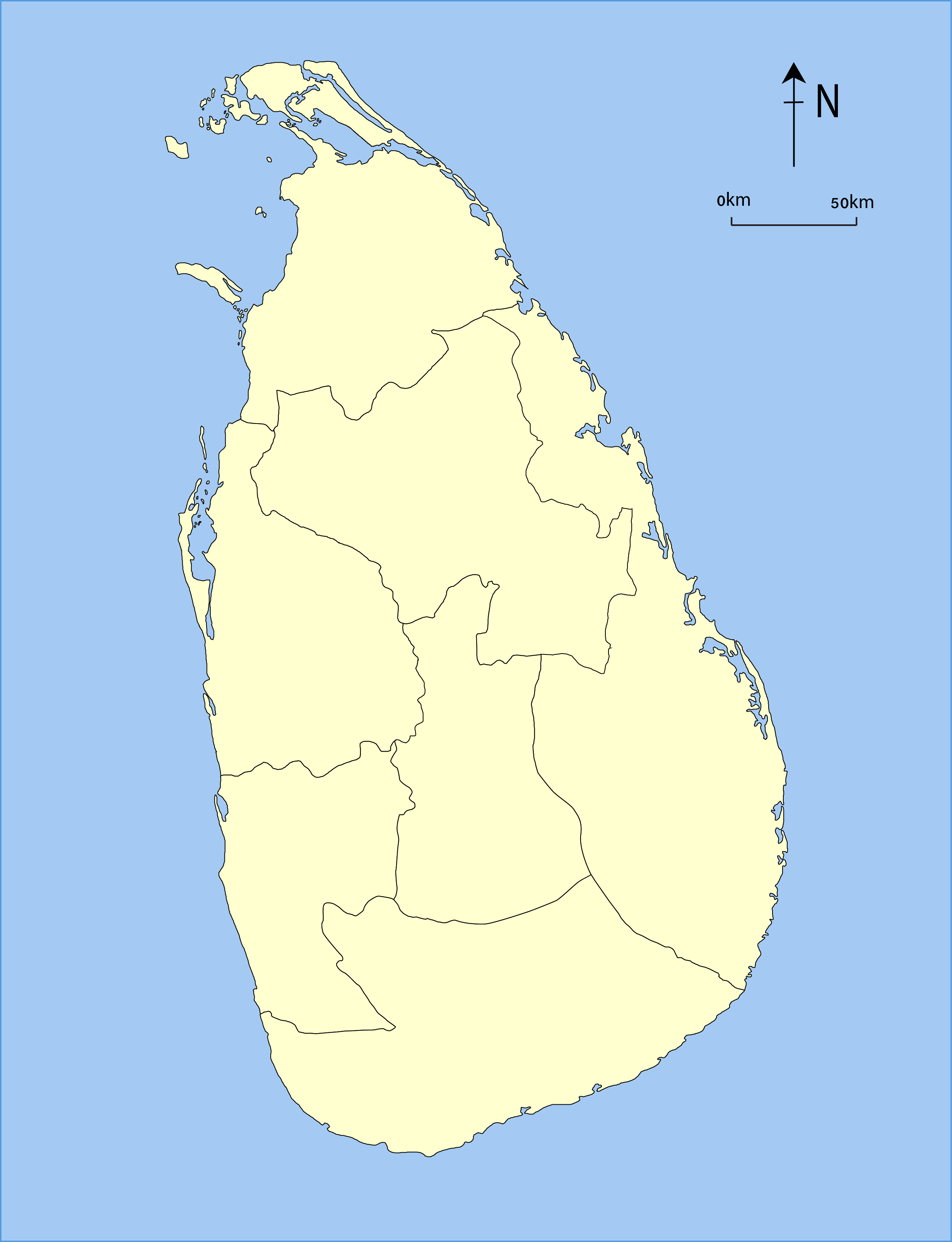
1873–1886

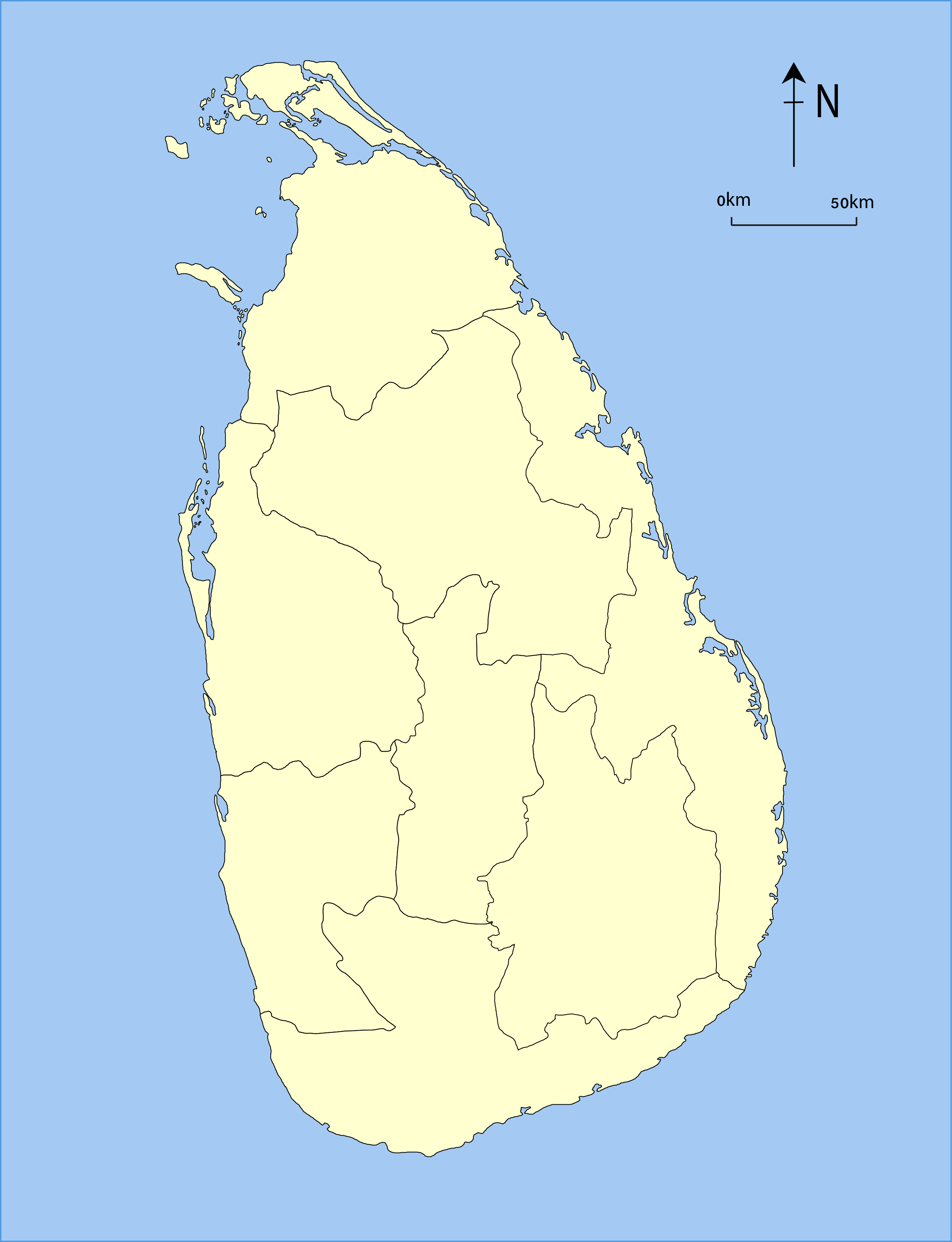
1886–1889

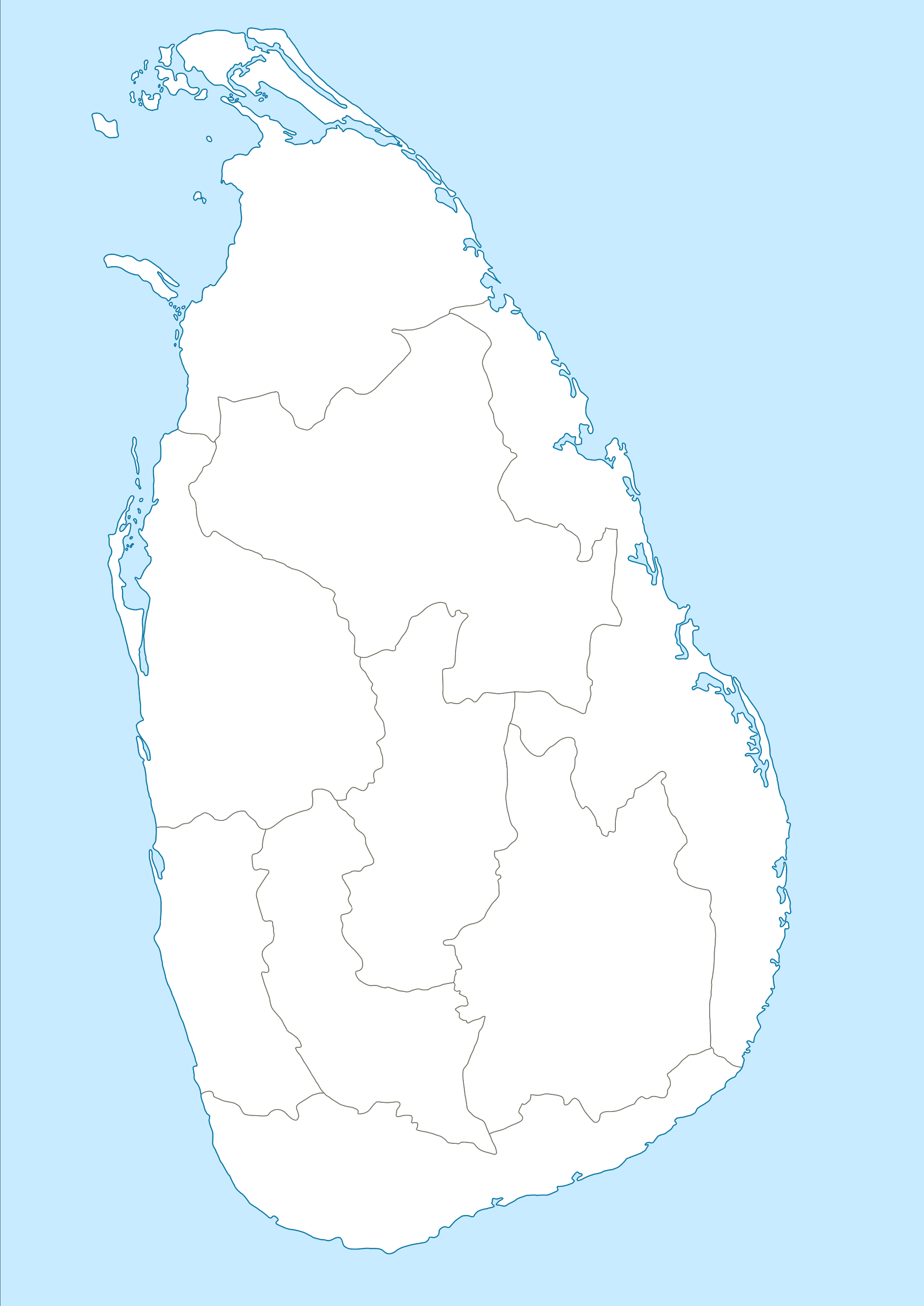
1889–present

=== Sri Lanka ===
The short lived North Eastern Province

The number of provinces remained static until September 1988 when, in accordance with the Indo-Lanka Accord, President J. R. Jayewardene issued proclamations enabling the Northern and Eastern provinces to be one administrative unit administered by one elected council, creating the North Eastern Province. The proclamations were only meant to be a temporary measure until a referendum was held in the Eastern Province on a permanent merger between the two provinces. However, the referendum was never held and successive Sri Lankan presidents issued proclamations annually extending the life of the "temporary" entity.

The merger was controversial and bitterly opposed by Sinhalese-speaking people, in particular. On 14 July 2006, after a long campaign against the merger, the JVP filed three separate petitions with the Supreme Court of Sri Lanka requesting a separate Provincial Council for the East. On 16 October 2006, the Supreme Court ruled that the proclamations issued by President Jayewardene were null and void and had no legal effect. The North Eastern Province was formally de-merged into the Northern and Eastern provinces on 1 January 2007.

Sri Lanka currently has nine provinces, seven of which have had provincial councils from the start.

== List of provinces ==
All population data is from the most recent census of Sri Lanka, in 2012.

Province	Area map	Provincial capital	Established	Land area in km^{2} (mi^{2})	Inland water area in km^{2} (mi^{2})	Total area in km^{2} (mi^{2})	Population (2012)	Population density per km^{2} (per mi^{2}) (Note: Population density has been calculated using the land area rather than the total area.)
(Central Province, Sri Lanka) Central	Area map of Central Province of Sri Lanka	Kandy	1 October 1833	5,575 (2,153)	99 (38)	5,674 (2,191)	2,571,557	461 (1,195)
(Eastern Province, Sri Lanka) Eastern	Area map of Eastern Province of Sri Lanka	Trincomalee	1 October 1833	9,361 (3,614)	635 (245)	9,996 (3,859)	1,555,510	166 (430)
(North Central Province, Sri Lanka) North Central	Area map of North Central Province of Sri Lanka	Anuradhapura	1873	9,741 (3,761)	731 (282)	10,472 (4,043)	1,266,663	130 (337)
(Northern Province, Sri Lanka) Northern	Area map of Northern Province of Sri Lanka	Jaffna	1 October 1833	8,290 (3,201)	594 (229)	8,884 (3,430)	1,061,315	128 (332)
(North Western Province, Sri Lanka) North Western	Area map of North Western Province of Sri Lanka	Kurunegala	1845	7,506 (2,898)	382 (147)	7,888 (3,046)	2,380,861	317 (822)
Sabaragamuwa	Area map of Sabaragamuwa, Sri Lanka	Ratnapura	1889	4,921 (1,900)	47 (18)	4,968 (1,918)	1,928,655	392 (1,015)
(Southern Province, Sri Lanka) Southern	Area map of Southern Province of Sri Lanka	Galle	1 October 1833	5,383 (2,078)	161 (62)	5,544 (2,141)	2,477,285	460 (1,192)
Uva	Area map of Uva, Sri Lanka	Badulla	1886	8,335 (3,218)	165 (64)	8,500 (3,282)	1,266,463	152 (394)
(Western Province, Sri Lanka) Western	Area map of Western Province of Sri Lanka	Colombo	1 October 1833	3,593 (1,387)	91 (35)	3,684 (1,422)	5,851,130	1,628 (4,218)
Total				62,705 (24,211)	2,905 (1,122)	65,610 (25,332)	20,359,439	325 (841)

== See also ==
- Provincial Governors of Sri Lanka
- Chief Ministers of Sri Lanka
- ISO 3166-2:LK

== Bibliography ==
- Mendis, G. C. (1946). Ceylon Under the British (2nd (Revised) ed.). Colombo: Colombo Apothecaries' Company.
- Kulasekera, Kulasekera Mudiyanselage Padmasiri (1984). "British Administration in the Kandyan Provinces of Sri Lanka, 1815-1833, With Special Reference to Social Change". PhD thesis.
