= North Eastern Province, Sri Lanka =

North Eastern Province வடக்கு கிழக்கு மாகாணம்
- Historical Province
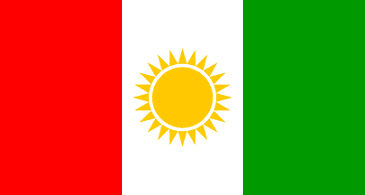
- Flag

- Location within Sri Lanka
- Coordinates: 8°15′N 81°20′E
- Country: Sri Lanka
- Created: September 1988
- Admitted: September 1988
- Abolished: 31 December 2006
- Capital: Trincomalee
- Largest City: Jaffna

Area
  - Total: 18,880 km^{2} (7,290 sq mi)
  - Land: 17,651 km^{2} (6,815 sq mi)
  - Rank: 1st (28.78% of total area)

Population (2003)
  - Total: 2,460,565
  - Density: 139.40/km^{2} (361.05/sq mi)
- Time zone: UTC+05:30 (Sri Lanka)
- Official Languages: Tamil, Sinhala

The North Eastern Province was one of the provinces of Sri Lanka. The province was created in September 1988 by merging the Northern and Eastern provinces. This merger was declared illegal by the Supreme Court of Sri Lanka in 2006. The province was formally demerged into the Northern and Eastern provinces on 1 January 2007. The capital of the province was Trincomalee.

== History ==
The Indo-Lanka Accord signed on 29 July 1987 required the Sri Lankan government to devolve powers to the provinces and, in the interim, to merge the Northern and Eastern provinces into one administrative unit. The accord required a referendum to be held by 31 December 1988 in the Eastern Province to decide whether the merger should be permanent. Crucially, the accord allowed the Sri Lankan president to postpone the referendum at his discretion

On 14 November 1987 the Sri Lankan Parliament passed the 13th Amendment to the 1978 Constitution of Sri Lanka and the Provincial Councils Act No 42 of 1987, establishing provincial councils. Nine provincial councils were created by order on 3 February 1988. On 2 and 8 September 1988 President Jayewardene issued proclamations enabling the Northern and Eastern provinces to be one administrative unit administered by one elected Council. The North Eastern Province was born.

The proclamations were only meant to be a temporary measure until a referendum was held in the Eastern Province on a permanent merger between the two provinces. However, the referendum was never held and successive Sri Lankan presidents have issued proclamations annually extending the life of the "temporary" entity.

The merger was bitterly opposed by Sinhalese nationalists. The combined North Eastern Province occupied one fourth of Sri Lanka. The thought of the Tamil people controlling this province, directly or indirectly, alarmed them greatly. On 14 July 2006, after a long campaign against the merger, the JVP filed three separate petitions with the Supreme Court of Sri Lanka requesting a separate Provincial Council for the East. On 16 October 2006 the Supreme Court ruled that the proclamations issued by President Jayewardene were null and void and had no legal effect. The North Eastern Province was formally demerged into the Northern and Eastern provinces on 1 January 2007.

== Provincial Council ==
The 13th Amendment to the 1978 Constitution of Sri Lanka and the Provincial Councils Act No 42 of 1987 established provincial councils. Nine provincial councils were created by order on 3 February 1988. The first elections for provincial councils took place on 28 April 1988 in North Central, North Western, Sabaragamuwa, and Uva provinces.

Elections in the newly merged North Eastern Province were scheduled for 19 November 1988. However, the Indian Peace Keeping Force (IPKF), which at that time occupied the province, rigged the elections in the north so that the Eelam People's Revolutionary Liberation Front (EPRLF) and Eelam National Democratic Liberation Front (ENDLF), two Indian backed paramilitary groups, won all of the 36 seats in the north uncontested. However, elections did take place for the 35 seats in the east. The Sri Lanka Muslim Congress won 17 seats, EPRLF 12 seats, ENDLF 5 seats and the United National Party 1 seat. On 10 December 1988 Annamalai Varadaraja Perumal, a former lecturer at the Jaffna University Economics Department, of the EPRLF became the first Chief Minister of the North Eastern Provincial Council.

On 1 March 1990, just as the IPKF were preparing to withdraw from Sri Lanka, Perumal moved a motion in the North-East Provincial Council declaring an independent Eelam. President Premadasa reacted to Perumal's UDI by dissolving the provincial council and imposing direct rule on the province.

The province was ruled directly from Colombo until May 2008 when elections were held for the demerged Eastern Provincial Council. The first consecutive Northern Provincial Council elections took place in 2013, with ITAK securing a majority of votes. C. V. Vigneswaran was appointed as the 1st Chief Minister of Northern Province following the results.

== Governors ==
The governors of the Sri Lankan provinces tend to be mostly retired politicians, judges and military officers. The North Eastern Province had six governors in its 18 years of existence:

No.	Name	Took office	Left office
1	Lieutenant General Nalin Seneviratne	30 November 1988	30 November 1993
2	Lionel Fernando	30 November 1993	23 August 1994
3	Gamini Fonseka	13 January 1995	20 October 1998
4	Major General Asoka Jayawardena	13 November 1998	30 November 2004
5	Tyronne Fernando	6 December 2004	20 January 2006
6	Rear Admiral Mohan Wijewickrama	21 January 2006	31 December 2006
