= 2nd Eastern Provincial Council =

Provincial council in Sri Lanka

←	1st Eastern Provincial Council

Overview
- Legislative body: Eastern Provincial Council
- Jurisdiction: Eastern Province, Sri Lanka
- Meeting place: Provincial Council Assembly Hall, Assembly Secretariat, Trincomalee
- Term: 1 October 2012
- Website: ep.gov.lk
- Members: 37
- Chairman: Ariyawathi Galappaththy, UPFA (2012-)
- Deputy Chairman: M. S. Subair, UPFA (2012-)
- Chief Minister: M. N. Abdul Majeed, UPFA (2012-)
- Party control: United People's Freedom Alliance

The 2nd Eastern Provincial Council is the current Eastern Provincial Council, with the membership determined by the results of the 2012 provincial council election held on 8 September 2012. The council met for the first time on 1 October 2012. According to the Constitution of Sri Lanka the maximum term of a provincial council is 5 years from the date of its first meeting.

== Election ==
The 2nd Eastern Provincial Council election was held on 8 September 2012. The incumbent United People's Freedom Alliance (UPFA) lost overall control of the council after winning only 14 of the 37 seats. The Tamil National Alliance (TNA), which had boycotted the previous election, became the second largest group after winning 11 seats. The Sri Lanka Muslim Congress (SLMC) and United National Party won 7 and 4 seats respectively. The National Freedom Front won the remaining seat.

=== Results ===
Alliance	Votes	%	Seats
United People's Freedom Alliance	200,044	31.58%	14
Tamil National Alliance	193,827	30.59%	11
Sri Lanka Muslim Congress	132,917	20.98%	7
United National Party	74,901	11.82%	4
National Freedom Front	9,522	1.50%	1
Others	22,323	3.52%	0
Total	633,534	100.00%	37

The new provincial council met for the first time on 1 October 2012. Ariyawathi Galappaththy (UPFA-SLFP) and M. S. Subair (UPFA-ACMC) were elected Chairman and Deputy Chairman respectively.

== Government/Board of Ministers ==
The UPFA was able to form an administration with the support of the SLMC. Under the agreement between the UPFA and SLMC a UPFA nominee would serve as Chief Minister for two and half years after a which a SLMC nominee would become Chief Minister. M. N. Abdul Majeed of the UPFA was appointed Chief Minister by Governor Mohan Wijewickrama. Majeed was sworn in on 18 September 2012 in Colombo in front of President Mahinda Rajapaksa. The four government ministers appointed by the Governor with effect from 24 September 2012 were: Ibrahim Mohamed Mohamed Mansoor (SLMC); Meera Sahibu Udumalebbe (UPFA-NC); Dissanayaka Wimalaweera (UPFA-SLFP); and Ahamed Nazeer Zainulabdeen (SLMC). As a result the Sri Lankan Tamils had no representation in the Board of Ministers (the government) despite being the largest ethnic group in the province.

== Changes in party/alliance affiliations ==
A few days after the election there were reports that some TNA councillors were being threatened and coerced into joining the UPFA. It was reported that members of the military intelligence were involved in the threats. G. Krishnapillai, M. Nadarajah, Kumaraswamy Nageswaran, N. Indirakumar and Murugesu Rajeswaran were offered land, money, houses, vehicles and government construction contracts, and threatened with relatives being arrested. None of the TNA councillors gave into the threats and the TNA lodged a complaint with the Election Commissioner.

== Members ==
Name	Electoral District	Preference Votes	Member From	Member To	Elected Party	Elected Alliance	Current Party	Current Alliance	Notes
Ameer, Ali	BAT	21,271	1 October 2012		ACMC	UPFA	ACMC	UPFA	
Chandradasa, A. P. G.	AMP	20,459	1 October 2012		UNP		UNP		
Chandrakanthan, S.	BAT	22,338	1 October 2012		TMVP	UPFA	TMVP	UPFA	
Fernando, A. W. B. N. M.	AMP	14,887	1 October 2012		UNP		UNP		
Galappaththy, Ariyawathi W. G. M.	TRI	14,224	1 October 2012		SLFP	UPFA	SLFP	UPFA	Chairman (12-).
Gamage, Daya	AMP	41,064	1 October 2012		UNP		UNP		
Indirakumar, N.	BAT	17,304	1 October 2012		TELO	TNA	TELO	TNA	
Jameel, A. Ahamed Mohamed	AMP	22,357	1 October 2012		SLMC		SLMC	UPFA	
Janarthanan, Jegatheesan	TRI	8,949	1 October 2012		ITAK	TNA	ITAK	TNA	
Jayasena, Thennakoon Mudiyanselage	BON		1 October 2012			UPFA		UPFA	
Kalaiarasan, T.	AMP	12,122	1 October 2012			TNA		TNA	
Karunakaran, G.	BAT	16,536	1 October 2012		TELO	TNA	TELO	TNA	
Krishnapillai, G.	BAT	20,200	1 October 2012		TULF	TNA	TULF	TNA	
Kumara, K. P. P. P.	TRI	12,393	1 October 2012			UPFA		UPFA	
Lebbe, A. Ameer Mahumud	AMP	19,671	1 October 2012		NC	UPFA	NC	UPFA	
Maharoof, Imran	TRI	10,048	1 October 2012		UNP		UNP		
Majeed, M. N. Abdul	TRI	11,726	1 October 2012		SLFP	UPFA	SLFP	UPFA	Chief Minister (12-). Minister of Finance and Planning, Law and Order, Local Government, Regional Administration, Man Power, Rehabilitation and Resettlement, Rural Development and Environment (12-).
Mansoor, I. M. M.	AMP	21,759	1 October 2012		SLMC		SLMC	UPFA	Minister of Health and Indigenous Medicine, Social Welfare, Probation and Childcare Services, Women's Affairs, Youth Affairs, Sports, Information Technology Education, Co-operative Development, Food Supply and Distribution (12-).
Mohamed, A. R.	TRI	10,904	1 October 2012		SLMC		SLMC	UPFA	
Moulana, Seyed Ali Zahir	BAT	align=right|13,764	6 February 2015	SLFP	UPFA	SLFP	UPFA		
Moulavi, S. L. M. H.	TRI	10,732	1 October 2012		SLMC		SLMC	UPFA	
Nadarajah, M.	BAT	16,681	1 October 2012		ITAK	TNA	ITAK	TNA	
Nageswaran, Kumaraswamy	TRI	10,911	1 October 2012		ITAK	TNA	ITAK	TNA	
Navarathnaraja, Thuraiyappa	BON		1 October 2012		SLFP	UPFA	SLFP	UPFA	
Nazeer, Ahamed Lebbe Mohamed	AMP	18,327	1 October 2012		SLMC		SLMC	UPFA	
Rajeswaran, Murugesu	AMP	10,812	1 October 2012			TNA		TNA	
Samsudeen, Ariff	AMP	19,680	1 October 2012		NC	UPFA	NC	UPFA	
Shibly, Abdul Farook Mohamed	BAT	20,407	1 October 2012		ACMC	UPFA	ACMC	UPFA	
Subair, Muhamed Sharief	BAT	17,903	1 October 2012		ACMC	UPFA	ACMC	UPFA	Deputy Chairman (12-).
Thandayuthapani, S.	TRI	20,854	1 October 2012		ITAK	TNA	ITAK	TNA	Leader of the Opposition (12-).
Thavam, Aadam Lebbe	AMP	32,330	1 October 2012		SLMC		SLMC	UPFA	
Thurairajasingam, K.	BAT	27,717	1 October 2012		ITAK	TNA	ITAK	TNA	
Thurairatnam, R.	BAT	29,141	1 October 2012		EPRLF	TNA	EPRLF	TNA	
Udumalebbe, Meera Sahibu	AMP	24,033	1 October 2012		NC	UPFA	NC	UPFA	Minister of Road Development, Irrigation, Housing and Construction, Rural Electrification and Water Supply (12-).
Weerasingha, D.	AMP	20,922	1 October 2012			UPFA		UPFA	
Wijesekara, N. G. W. M. J.	TRI	7,303	1 October 2012		NFF		NFF	UPFA	
Wimalaweera, Dissanayaka	AMP	31,815	1 October 2012		SLFP	UPFA	SLFP	UPFA	Minister of Education, Cultural Affairs, Lands and Land Development and Transport (12-).
Zainulabdeen, Ahamed Nazeer	BAT	11,401	1 October 2012		SLMC		SLMC		Minister of Agriculture, Animal Production and Development, Rural Industries Development, Fisheries and Tourism (12-).
