= 1st Eastern Provincial Council =

Sri Lankan provincial council, 2008–2012

2nd Eastern Provincial Council	→

Overview
- Legislative body: Eastern Provincial Council
- Jurisdiction: Eastern Province, Sri Lanka
- Meeting place: Provincial Council Assembly Hall, Assembly Secretariat, Trincomalee
- Term: 4 June 2008–27 June 2012
- Website: ep.gov.lk
- Members: 37
- Chairman: Ajju Mohamed Mohamed Faiz, UPFA (2008-)
- Deputy Chairman: M. K. D. S. Gunawardena, UPFA (2008-)
- Chief Minister: S. Chandrakanthan, UPFA (2008-12)
- Party control: United People's Freedom Alliance

The 1st Eastern Provincial Council was a meeting of the Eastern Provincial Council, with the membership determined by the results of the 2008 provincial council election held on 10 May 2008. The council met for the first time on 4 June 2008 and was dissolved prematurely on 27 June 2012.

== Election ==
The 1st Eastern Provincial Council election was held on 10 May 2008. The United People's Freedom Alliance (UPFA), which was in power nationally, formed an alliance the Tamil Makkal Viduthalai Pulikal (TMVP) paramilitary group and won 20 of the 37 seats. The United National Party (UNP) formed an alliance the Sri Lanka Muslim Congress and won 15 seats. Smaller parties won the remaining 2 seats. The Tamil National Alliance (TNA), the largest party representing the Sri Lankan Tamils boycotted the election.

=== Results ===
Alliance	Votes	%	Seats
United People's Freedom Alliance/Tamil Makkal Viduthalai Pulikal	308,886	52.21%	20
United National Party/Sri Lanka Muslim Congress	250,732	42.38%	15
Janatha Vimukthi Peramuna	9,390	1.59%	1
Tamil Democratic National Alliance	7,714	1.30%	1
Others	14,954	2.53%	0
Total	591,676	100.00%	37

The new provincial council met for the first time on 4 June 2008. Ajju Mohamed Mohamed Faiz and M. K. D. S. Gunawardena were elected Chairman and Deputy Chairman respectively.

== Government/Board of Ministers ==
S. Chandrakanthan, leader of the paramilitary Tamil Makkal Viduthalai Pulikal, was appointed Chief Minister by Governor Mohan Wijewickrama. Chandrakanthan was sworn in on 16 May 2008 in Colombo in front of President Mahinda Rajapaksa. The four government ministers appointed by the Governor with effect from 16 May 2008 were: M. L. Alim Mohammad Hisbullah (UPFA-ACMC); Thuraiyappa Navarathnaraja (UPFA-TMVP); Meera Sahibu Udumalebbe (UPFA-NC); and Dissanayaka Wimalaweera (UPFA-SLFP).

Minister M. L. Alim Mohammad Hisbullah (UPFA-ACMC) lost his seat on the council after being elected to Parliament. His ministerial replacement Muhamed Sharief Subair (UPFA-ACMC) was sworn in on 17 May 2010 in Trincomalee in front of the Governor.

According to article 154E of the Constitution of Sri Lanka the normal life of a provincial council is five years from the date of its first meeting. But using powers granted to him by article 154B(8)c Governor Mohan Wijewickrama dissolved the council prematurely on 27 June 2012, nearly a year ahead of schedule.

== Deaths and resignations ==
The 1st Eastern Provincial Council saw the following deaths and resignations:

- 8 July 2008: Rauff Hakeem (UNP-TRI) resigned to take a National List seat in the Parliament. His replacement was A. U. Razik Fareed.
- July 2008: Hasen Ali (UNP-AMP) resigned to take a National List seat in the Parliament. His replacement was Masoor Sinnalebbe.
- April 2010: M. S. Thowfeek (UNP-TRI) lost his seat after being elected to Parliament. His replacement was A. R. Mohamed.
- April 2010: M. L. Alim Mohammad Hisbullah (UPFA-BAT) lost his seat after being elected to Parliament. His replacement was K. L. M. Fareed.
- April 2010: M. K. D. S. Gunawardena (UPFA-TRI) lost his seat after being elected to Parliament. His replacement was N. G. Hewawitharana.
- April 2010: Basheer Segu Dawood (UNP-BAT) lost his seat after being elected to Parliament. His replacement was M. H. Sehu Ismail.
- 15 April 2011: T. A. K. Thewarapperuma (UPFA-AMP) died. His replacement was D. R. S. Premarathna.

== Members ==
Name	Electoral District	Preference Votes	Member From	Member To	Elected Party	Elected Alliance	Final Party	Final Alliance	Notes
Ali, Hasan	AMP		4 June 2008	July 2008	SLMC	UNP	SLMC	UNP	Resigned. Replaced by Masoor Sinnalebbe.
Chandradasa, A. P. G.	AMP		4 June 2008	27 June 2012		UNP		UNP	
Chandrakanthan, S.	BAT	41,936	4 June 2008	27 June 2012	TMVP	UPFA	TMVP	UPFA	Chief Minister (08-12). Minister for Finance and Planning, Law and Order, Local Government, Regional Administration, Man Power, Rehabilitation and Resettlement, Rural Development, Tourism and Environment (08-).
Dawood, Basheer Segu	BAT		4 June 2008	April 2010	SLMC	UNP	SLMC	UNP	Lost his seat. Replaced by M. H. Sehu Ismail.
Faiz, Ajju Mohamed Mohamed	TRI		4 June 2008	27 June 2012		UPFA		UPFA	Chairman (08-).
Fareed, A. U. Razik	TRI		August 2008	27 June 2012		UNP		UNP	Replaces Rauff Hakeem.
Fareed, K. L. M.	BAT		May 2010	27 June 2012		UPFA		UPFA	Replaces M. L. Alim Mohammad Hisbullah.
Galappaththy, Ariyawathi W. G. M.	TRI		4 June 2008	27 June 2012	SLFP	UPFA	SLFP	UPFA	
Gamage, Daya	AMP		4 June 2008	27 June 2012		UNP		UNP	
Gunawardena, M. K. D. S.	TRI		4 June 2008	April 2010	SLFP	UPFA	SLFP	UPFA	Deputy Chairman (08-). Lost his seat. Replaced by N. G. Hewawitharana.
Hakeem, Rauff	TRI		4 June 2008	8 July 2008	SLMC	UNP	SLMC	UNP	Resigned. Replaced by A. U. Razik Fareed.
Hewawitharana, N. G.	TRI		May 2010	27 June 2012		UPFA		UPFA	Replaces M. K. D. S. Gunawardena.
Hisbullah, M. L. Alim Mohammad	BAT	35,949	4 June 2008	April 2010	ACMC	UPFA	ACMC	UPFA	Minister for Health and Indigenous Medicine, Social Welfare, Probation and Childcare Services, Women's Affairs, Youth Affairs, Sports, Information Technology Education, Co-operative Development, Food Supply and Distribution (08-10). Lost his seat. Replaced by K. L. M. Fareed.
Ismail, M. H. Sehu	BAT		May 2010	27 June 2012		UNP		UNP	Replaces Basheer Segu Dawood.
Jameel, Ahamed Mohomad	AMP		4 June 2008	27 June 2012		UNP		UNP	
Krishnanandaharajah, Edwin Silva	BAT		4 June 2008	27 June 2012	TMVP	UPFA	TMVP	UPFA	
Lebbe, A. Ameer Mahumud	AMP		4 June 2008	27 June 2012	NC	UPFA	NC	UPFA	
Majeed, Abdul	AMP		4 June 2008	27 June 2012		UNP		UNP	
Marikkar, Apthurrazaak Kulanthai	AMP		4 June 2008	27 June 2012		UNP		UNP	
Masilamany, Thambimuththu Alosiyas	BAT		4 June 2008	27 June 2012		UNP		UNP	
Mohamed, A. A. A. M. M.	TRI		4 June 2008	27 June 2012		UNP		UNP	
Mohamed, A. R.	TRI		May 2010	27 June 2012		UNP		UNP	Replaces M. S. Thowfeek.
Monakurusamy, R.	BON		4 June 2008	27 June 2012		UPFA		UPFA	
Moulavi, S. L. M. H.	TRI		4 June 2008	27 June 2012		UPFA		UPFA	
Navarathnaraja, Thuraiyappa	AMP		4 June 2008	27 June 2012	TMVP	UPFA	SLFP	UPFA	Minister for Agriculture, Animal Production and Development, Rural Industries Development and Fisheries (08-).
Nayim, Meera Labbe Thulkar	AMP		4 June 2008	27 June 2012	NC	UPFA	NC	UPFA	
Parasuraman, Arunasalam	TRI		4 June 2008	27 June 2012		UNP		UNP	
Piyathissa, K. G. Wimal	TRI		4 June 2008	27 June 2012	JVP		JVP		
Premakumara, K. P. P.	BON		4 June 2008	27 June 2012		UPFA		UPFA	
Premarathna, D. R. S.	AMP		May 2011	27 June 2012		UPFA		UPFA	Replaces T. A. K. Thewarapperuma.
Pushparaja, Somasundaram	AMP		4 June 2008	27 June 2012	TMVP	UPFA	TMVP	UPFA	
Salih, Aliyar Salih Javahir	BAT	36,419	4 June 2008	27 June 2012	ACMC	UPFA	ACMC	UPFA	
Sasitharan, Arasaretnam	BAT		4 June 2008	27 June 2012		UNP		UNP	
Selvaraja, Seeniththamby	AMP		4 June 2008	27 June 2012	TMVP	UPFA	TMVP	UPFA	
Sinnalebbe, Masoor	AMP		September 2008	27 June 2012		UNP		UNP	Replaces Hasen Ali.
Subair, Muhamed Sharief	BAT	35,615	4 June 2008	27 June 2012	ACMC	UPFA	ACMC	UPFA	Minister of Health & Indigenous Medicine, Social Welfare, Probation and Childcare Services, Women's Affairs, Youth Affairs, Sports, Information Technology Education, Co-operative Development, Food Supply and Distribution (10-).
Thewarapperuma, T. A. K.	AMP		4 June 2008	15 April 2011	SLFP	UPFA	SLFP	UPFA	Died. Replaced by D. R. S. Premarathna.
Thiraviyam, Nagalingam	BAT	23,729	4 June 2008	27 June 2012	TMVP	UPFA	TMVP	UPFA	
Thowfeek, M. S.	TRI		4 June 2008	April 2010	SLMC	UNP	SLMC	UNP	Lost his seat. Replaced by A. R. Mohamed.
Thurairatnam, R.	BAT		4 June 2008	27 June 2012	EPRLF	TDNA	EPRLF	TNA	
Udumalebbe, Meera Sahibu	AMP		4 June 2008	27 June 2012	NC	UPFA	NC	UPFA	Minister for Road Development, Irrigation, Housing and Construction, Rural Electrification and Water Supply (08-).
Varathan, R. S. N.	TRI		4 June 2008	27 June 2012		UNP		UNP	
Vellathamby, Ameertheen	BAT		4 June 2008	27 June 2012		UNP		UNP	
Wimalaweera, Dissanayaka	AMP		4 June 2008	27 June 2012	SLFP	UPFA	SLFP	UPFA	Minister for Education, Cultural Affairs, Lands and Land Development and Transport (08-).
