= 2008–09 Sri Lankan provincial council elections =

5th Sri Lankan provincial council election
- 10 May 2008, 23 August 2008, 14 February 2009; 25 April 2009, 8 August 2009, 10 October 2009

417 seats across 8 provincial councils
- Turnout: 65.84%
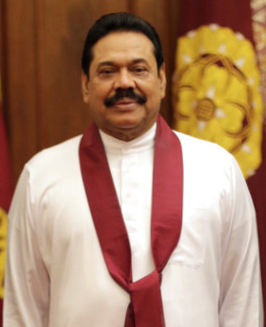

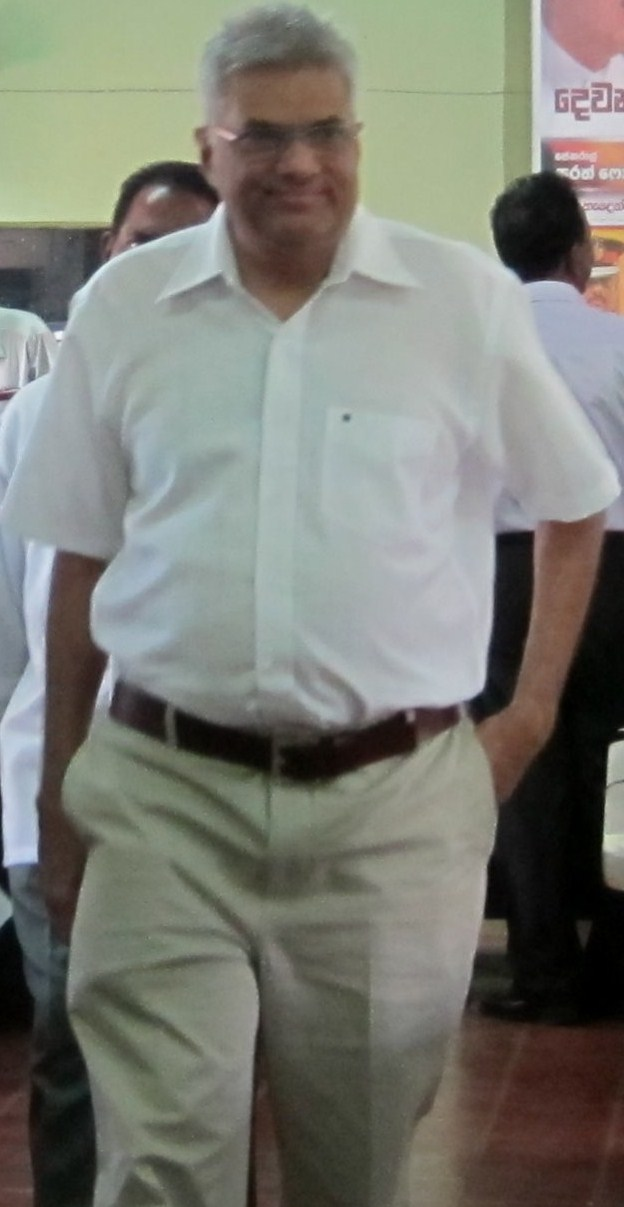
| | First party | Second party |
|---|---|---|
| Leader | Mahinda Rajapaksa | Ranil Wickremasinghe |
| Party | UPFA | UNP |
| Popular vote | 5,137,170 | 2,609,386 |
| Percentage | 63.10% | 32.05% |
| Councillors | 269 | 131 |
| Councils | 8 | 0 |
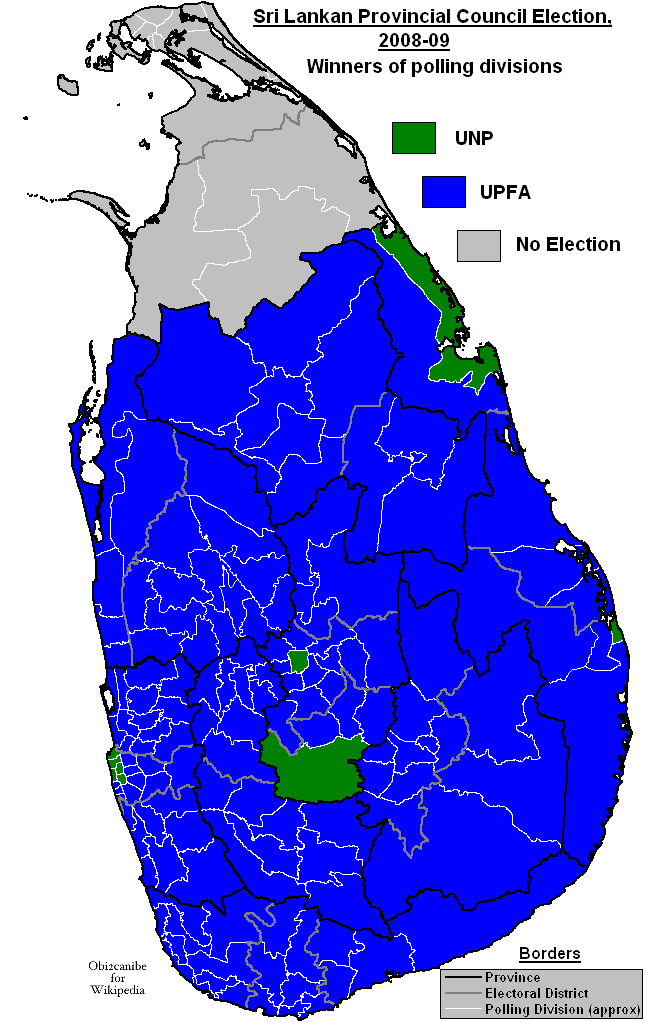
- Winners of polling divisions. UPFA in blue and UNP in green.

Sri Lanka has held several rounds of Provincial Council elections in 2008 and 2009 to elect members to eight of the country’s Provincial Councils. The decision to hold elections in different parts of the country on separate days was a break in the usual practice, which is to hold elections for the whole country on the same day. For each provincial council, members are elected to serve a five-year term. A chief minister for the province is chosen by the elected members.

The first election was held in May 2008 to elect members to Sri Lanka's Eastern Provincial Council. In August 2008, elections were held in the North Central and Sabaragamuwa Provinces. In 2009, elections were held for Central and North Western Provincial Councils in February, for the Western Provincial Council in April, for the Uva Provincial Council in August and for the Southern Provincial Council in October. No election was held for the ninth provincial council, Northern, which had been governed directly by the national government since it was demerged from the North Eastern Provincial Council in January 2007.

The elections were largely seen as a referendum on the handling of the civil war by Sri Lanka's President Mahinda Rajapakse. Rajapakse's United People's Freedom Alliance and its allies registered resounding victories over the opposition United National Party in all the elections.

== Background ==
In an attempt to end the Sri Lankan Civil War the Indo-Lanka Accord was signed on 29 July 1987. One of the requirements of the accord was that the Sri Lankan government to devolve powers to the provinces. Accordingly on 14 November 1987 the Sri Lankan Parliament passed the 13th Amendment to the 1978 Constitution of Sri Lanka and the Provincial Councils Act No 42 of 1987. On 3 February 1988 nine provincial councils were created by order. The first elections for provincial councils took place on 28 April 1988 in North Central, North Western, Sabaragamuwa, and Uva provinces. On 2 June 1988 elections were held for provincial councils for Central, Southern and Western provinces. The United National Party (UNP), which was in power nationally, won control of all seven provincial councils.

The Indo-Lanka Accord also required the merger of the Eastern and Northern provinces into one administrative unit. The accord required a referendum to be held by 31 December 1988 in the Eastern Province to decide whether the merger should be permanent. Crucially, the accord allowed the Sri Lankan president to postpone the referendum at his discretion. On September 2 and 8 1988 President Jayewardene issued proclamations enabling the Eastern and Northern provinces to be one administrative unit administered by one elected council, creating the North Eastern Province. Elections in the newly merged North Eastern Province were held on 19 November 1988. The Eelam People's Revolutionary Liberation Front, an Indian backed paramilitary group, won control of the North Eastern provincial council.

On 1 March 1990, just as the Indian Peace Keeping Force were preparing to withdraw from Sri Lanka, Annamalai Varatharajah Perumal, Chief Minister of the North Eastern Province, moved a motion in the North Eastern Provincial Council declaring an independent Eelam. President Premadasa reacted to Permual's UDI by dissolving the provincial council and imposing direct rule on the province.

The 2nd Sri Lankan provincial council election was held in 1993 in seven provinces. The UNP retained control of six provincial councils but lost control of the largest provincial council, Western, to the opposition People's Alliance. A special election was held in Southern Province in 1994 after some UNP provincial councillors defected to the opposition. The PA won the election and took control of the Southern Provincial Council.

The 3rd Sri Lankan provincial council election was held in 1999 in seven provinces. The PA, which was now in power nationally, managed to win the majority of seats in two provinces (North Central and North Western). It was also able to form a majority administration in the other five provinces with the support of smaller parties such as the Ceylon Workers' Congress (CWC) . The UNP regained control of the Central Provincial Council in 2002 after the CWC councillors crossed over to the opposition.

The 4th Sri Lankan provincial council election was held in 2004 in seven provinces. The United People's Freedom Alliance (UPFA), the successor to the PA, won all seven provinces.

== Results ==
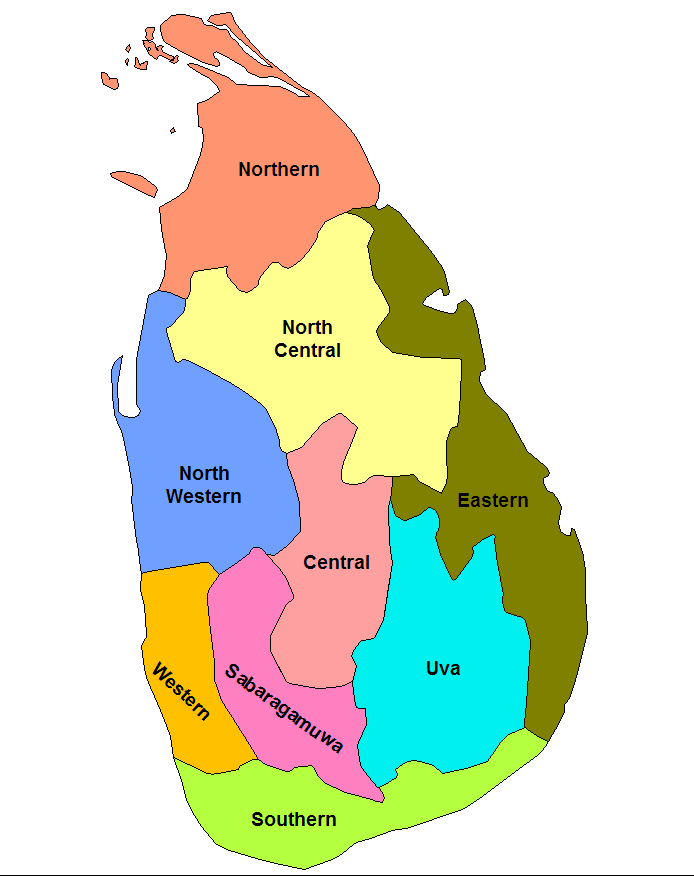
The nine provinces of the country

The UPFA won all eight provinces.

=== Overall ===
| Party / Alliance | Votes | % | Seats |
|---|---|---|---|
| United People's Freedom Alliance^{1} | 5,137,170 | 63.10% | 269 |
| United National Party^{2} | 2,609,386 | 32.05% | 131 |
| Janatha Vimukthi Peramuna | 234,442 | 2.88% | 12 |
| Sri Lanka Muslim Congress^{2} | 60,091 | 0.74% | 2 |
| Independents | 15,789 | 0.19% | 0 |
| Democratic Unity Alliance | 12,512 | 0.15% | 1 |
| Up-Country People's Front | 10,645 | 0.13% | 1 |
| Ceylon Workers' Congress^{1} | 10,163 | 0.12% | 0 |
| United Socialist Party | 9,024 | 0.11% | 0 |
| Tamil Democratic National Alliance | 7,714 | 0.09% | 1 |
| United National Alliance | 7,098 | 0.09% | 0 |
| Eelam People's Democratic Party | 5,418 | 0.07% | 0 |
| Left Front | 4,771 | 0.06% | 0 |
| National Development Front | 3,558 | 0.04% | 0 |
| National Congress | 3,404 | 0.04% | 0 |
| Eelavar Democratic Front | 2,275 | 0.03% | 0 |
| Ruhuna People's Party | 1,618 | 0.02% | 0 |
| United Lanka People's Party | 911 | 0.01% | 0 |
| New Sinhala Heritage | 838 | 0.01% | 0 |
| United Lanka Great Council | 803 | 0.01% | 0 |
| Sinhalaye Mahasammatha Bhoomiputra Pakshaya | 700 | 0.01% | 0 |
| Socialist Equality Party | 503 | 0.01% | 0 |
| Sri Lanka Progressive Front | 475 | 0.01% | 0 |
| Janasetha Peramuna | 306 | 0.00% | 0 |
| People's Front of Liberation Tigers | 383 | 0.00% | 0 |
| Patriotic National Front | 379 | 0.00% | 0 |
| All Lanka Tamil United Front | 378 | 0.00% | 0 |
| National People's Party | 302 | 0.00% | 0 |
| Democratic United National Front | 107 | 0.00% | 0 |
| Muslim Liberation Front | 49 | 0.00% | 0 |
| Sri Lanka National Front | 30 | 0.00% | 0 |
| Liberal Party | 20 | 0.00% | 0 |
| Valid Votes | 8,141,262 | 100.00% | 417 |
| Rejected Votes | 427,543 | | |
| Total Polled | 8,568,805 | | |
| Registered Electors | 13,013,731 | | |
| Turnout | 65.84% | | |
1. CWC contested with the UPFA in Central and Uva provinces.; 2. SLMC contested with the UNP in Eastern province.

=== Central Province ===
Summary of the February 14, 2009 Sri Lanka Central Provincial Council election results
| Party | Kandy | | Matale | | Nuwara Eliya | | Seats | | | Popular Vote | |
| Party | Votes | Seats | Votes | Seats | Votes | Seats | 2004 | 2009 | +/− | Vote | % |
|---|---|---|---|---|---|---|---|---|---|---|---|
| United People's Freedom Alliance | 363,490 | 18 | 140,295 | 7 | 146,418 | 9 | 30 | ^{[1]}36 | +6 | 650,203 | 59.53% |
| United National Party | 237,827 | 12 | 56,009 | 3 | 128,289 | 7 | 26 | 22 | −4 | 422,125 | 38.65% |
| Total | 643,617 | 30 | 218,406 | 10 | 309,666 | 16 | 58 | 58 | 0 | 1,167,336 | 100% |
Voter turnout: 66.84%
Source: Sri Lanka Department of Elections Notes: 1. Includes 2 bonus seats

=== Eastern Province ===
Summary of the May 10, 2008 Sri Lanka Eastern Provincial Council election results
| Alliances and parties | Ampara | | | Batticaloa | | | Trincomalee | | | Bonus Seats | Total | | |
| Alliances and parties | Votes | % | Seats | Votes | % | Seats | Votes | % | Seats | Bonus Seats | Votes | % | Seats |
|---|---|---|---|---|---|---|---|---|---|---|---|---|---|
| United People's Freedom Alliance (ACMC, NC, SLFP, TMVP et al.) | 144,247 | 52.96% | 8 | 105,341 | 58.09% | 6 | 59,298 | 42.99% | 4 | 2 | 308,886 | 52.21% | ^{[1]}20 |
| United National Party (SLMC, UNP) | 121,272 | 44.52% | 6 | 58,602 | 32.31% | 4 | 70,858 | 51.37% | 5 | 0 | 250,732 | 42.38% | 15 |
| Janatha Vimukthi Peramuna | 4,745 | 1.74% | 0 | 379 | 0.21% | 0 | 4,266 | 3.09% | 1 | 0 | 9,390 | 1.59% | 1 |
| Tamil Democratic National Alliance (EPRLF(P), PLOTE, TULF et al.) | | | | 7,714 | 4.25% | 1 | | | | 0 | 7,714 | 1.30% | 1 |
| Eelam People's Democratic Party | | | | 5,418 | 2.99% | 0 | | | | 0 | 5,418 | 0.92% | 0 |
| Independent Groups | 737 | 0.27% | 0 | 823 | 0.45% | 0 | 1,073 | 0.78% | 0 | 0 | 2,633 | 0.45% | 0 |
| United Socialist Party | 296 | 0.11% | 0 | 943 | 0.52% | 0 | 1,309 | 0.95% | 0 | 0 | 2,548 | 0.43% | 0 |
| Eelavar Democratic Front (EROS) | | | | 1,816 | 1.00% | 0 | 459 | 0.33% | 0 | 0 | 2,275 | 0.38% | 0 |
| United National Alliance | 597 | 0.22% | 0 | | | | | | | 0 | 597 | 0.10% | 0 |
| People's Front of Liberation Tigers | 63 | 0.02% | 0 | 157 | 0.09% | 0 | 163 | 0.12% | 0 | 0 | 383 | 0.06% | 0 |
| All Lanka Tamil United Front | | | | | | | 378 | 0.27% | 0 | 0 | 378 | 0.06% | 0 |
| New Sinhala Heritage | 312 | 0.11% | 0 | | | | | | | 0 | 312 | 0.05% | 0 |
| National Development Front | 100 | 0.04% | 0 | | | | 89 | 0.06% | 0 | 0 | 189 | 0.03% | 0 |
| Sinhalaye Mahasammatha Bhoomiputra Pakshaya | 11 | 0.00% | 0 | 85 | 0.05% | 0 | 13 | 0.01% | 0 | 0 | 109 | 0.02% | 0 |
| Muslim Liberation Front | | | | 39 | 0.02% | 0 | | | | 0 | 39 | 0.01% | 0 |
| Sri Lanka National Front | | | | 21 | 0.01% | 0 | 9 | 0.01% | 0 | 0 | 30 | 0.01% | 0 |
| Sri Lanka Progressive Front | | | | 17 | 0.01% | 0 | 9 | 0.01% | 0 | 0 | 26 | 0.00% | 0 |
| Ruhuna People's Party | 9 | 0.00% | 0 | | | | 5 | 0.00% | 0 | 0 | 14 | 0.00% | 0 |
| Liberal Party | 3 | 0.00% | 0 | | | | | | | 0 | 3 | 0.00% | 0 |
| Valid Votes | 272,392 | 100.00% | 14 | 181,355 | 100.00% | 11 | 137,929 | 100.00% | 10 | 2 | 591,676 | 100.00% | 37 |
| Rejected Votes | 20,997 | | | 21,088 | | | 12,695 | | | | 54,780 | | |
| Total Polled | 293,389 | | | 202,443 | | | 150,624 | | | | 646,456 | | |
| Registered Electors | 409,308 | | | 330,950 | | | 242,463 | | | | 982,721 | | |
| Turnout | 71.68% | | | 61.17% | | | 62.12% | | | | 65.78% | | |
Source: Sri Lanka Department of Elections Archived 2012-02-19 at the Wayback Machine Notes: 1. Includes 2 bonus seats

=== North Central Province ===
Summary of the August 23, 2008 Sri Lanka North Central Provincial Council election results
| Party | Anuradhapura | | Polonnaruwa | | Seats | | | Popular Vote | |
| Party | Votes | Seats | Votes | Seats | 2004 | 2009 | +/− | Vote | % |
|---|---|---|---|---|---|---|---|---|---|
| United People's Freedom Alliance | 199,547 | 12 | 107,910 | 6 | 22 | ^{[1]}20 | −2 | 307,457 | 56.37% |
| United National Party | 142,019 | 8 | 63,265 | 4 | 10 | 12 | +2 | 205,284 | 37.64% |
| Janatha Vimukthi Peramuna | 19,357 | 1 | 7,381 | 0 | ^{[2]}0 | 1 | +1 | 26,738 | 4.90% |
| Total | 382,677 | 21 | 190,845 | 10 | 33 | 33 | 0 | 573,522 | 100% |
Voter turnout: 67.75%
Source: Sri Lanka Department of Elections Notes: 1. Includes 2 bonus seats; 2. Contested in 2004 as part of the UPFA

=== North Western Province ===
Summary of the February 14, 2009 Sri Lanka North Western Provincial Council election results
| Party | Kurunegala | | Puttalam | | Seats | | | Popular Vote | |
| Party | Votes | Seats | Votes | Seats | 2004 | 2009 | +/− | Vote | % |
|---|---|---|---|---|---|---|---|---|---|
| United People's Freedom Alliance | 497,366 | 24 | 171,377 | 11 | 31 | ^{[1]}37 | +6 | 668,743 | 69.43% |
| United National Party | 193,548 | 9 | 76,799 | 5 | 19 | 14 | −5 | 270,347 | 28.07% |
| Janatha Vimukthi Peramuna | 16,084 | 1 | 4,344 | 0 | ^{[2]}0 | 1 | +1 | 20,428 | 2.12% |
| Total | 735,846 | 34 | 274,014 | 16 | 52 | 52 | 0 | 1,009,860 | 100% |
Voter turnout: 60.77%
Source: Sri Lanka Department of Elections Notes: 1. Includes 2 bonus seats; 2. Contested in 2004 as part of the UPFA

=== Sabaragamuwa Province ===
Summary of the August 23, 2008 Sri Lanka Sabaragamuwa Provincial Council election results
| Party | Ratnapura | | Polonnaruwa | | Seats | | | Popular Vote | |
| Party | Votes | Seats | Votes | Seats | 2004 | 2009 | +/− | Vote | % |
|---|---|---|---|---|---|---|---|---|---|
| United People's Freedom Alliance | 260,218 | 13 | 212,571 | 7 | 28 | ^{[1]}25 | −3 | 472,789 | 55.34% |
| United National Party | 191,996 | 10 | 154,325 | 7 | 15 | 17 | +2 | 346,321 | 40.53% |
| Janatha Vimukthi Peramuna | 9,703 | 1 | 9,365 | 1 | ^{[2]}0 | 2 | +2 | 19,068 | 2.23% |
| Total | 497,013 | 24 | 404,660 | 18 | 44 | 44 | 0 | 901,673 | 100% |
Voter turnout: 68.37%
Source: Sri Lanka Department of Elections Notes: 1. Includes 2 bonus seats; 2. Contested in 2004 as part of the UPFA

=== Southern Province ===
Results of the 6th Southern provincial council election held on 10 October 2009:

| Party / Alliance | Galle | | | Hambantota | | | Matara | | | Bonus Seats | Total | | |
| Party / Alliance | Votes | % | Seats | Votes | % | Seats | Votes | % | Seats | Bonus Seats | Votes | % | Seats |
|---|---|---|---|---|---|---|---|---|---|---|---|---|---|
| United People's Freedom Alliance | 354,000 | 68.34% | 16 | 192,961 | 66.95% | 8 | 257,110 | 67.97% | 12 | 2 | 804,071 | 67.88% | 38 |
| United National Party | 140,175 | 27.06% | 6 | 62,391 | 21.65% | 3 | 94,614 | 25.01% | 5 | | 297,180 | 25.09% | 14 |
| Janatha Vimukthi Peramuna | 19,958 | 3.85% | 1 | 31,734 | 11.01% | 1 | 20,687 | 5.47% | 1 | | 72,379 | 6.11% | 3 |
| Sri Lanka Muslim Congress | 2,273 | 0.44% | 0 | | | | 4,280 | 1.13% | 0 | | 6,553 | 0.55% | 0 |
| Independents | 260 | 0.05% | 0 | 389 | 0.13% | 0 | 343 | 0.09% | 0 | | 992 | 0.08% | 0 |
| United National Alliance | 500 | 0.10% | 0 | | | | 371 | 0.10% | 0 | | 871 | 0.07% | 0 |
| United Socialist Party | 366 | 0.07% | 0 | 221 | 0.08% | 0 | 218 | 0.06% | 0 | | 805 | 0.07% | 0 |
| National Development Front | | | | 174 | 0.06% | 0 | 294 | 0.08% | 0 | | 468 | 0.04% | 0 |
| United Lanka People's Party | 57 | 0.01% | 0 | 217 | 0.08% | 0 | | | | | 274 | 0.02% | 0 |
| Janasetha Peramuna | 89 | 0.02% | 0 | 52 | 0.02% | 0 | 98 | 0.03% | 0 | | 239 | 0.02% | 0 |
| United Lanka Great Council | 19 | 0.00% | 0 | 55 | 0.02% | 0 | 36 | 0.01% | 0 | | 110 | 0.01% | 0 |
| Socialist Equality Party | 95 | 0.02% | 0 | | | | | | | | 95 | 0.01% | 0 |
| Left Front | 92 | 0.02% | 0 | | | | | | | | 92 | 0.01% | 0 |
| Sinhalaye Mahasammatha Bhoomiputra Pakshaya | 36 | 0.01% | 0 | 23 | 0.01% | 0 | 32 | 0.01% | 0 | | 91 | 0.01% | 0 |
| Sri Lanka Progressive Front | 38 | 0.01% | 0 | 14 | 0.00% | 0 | 34 | 0.01% | 0 | | 86 | 0.01% | 0 |
| Democratic Unity Alliance | | | | | | | 61 | 0.02% | 0 | | 61 | 0.01% | 0 |
| Ruhuna People's Party | 21 | 0.00% | 0 | | | | 31 | 0.01% | 0 | | 52 | 0.00% | 0 |
| National People's Party | 49 | 0.01% | 0 | | | | | | | | 49 | 0.00% | 0 |
| Patriotic National Front | | | | | | | 43 | 0.01% | 0 | | 43 | 0.00% | 0 |
| Valid Votes | 518,028 | 100.00% | 23 | 288,231 | 100.00% | 12 | 378,252 | 100.00% | 18 | 2 | 1,184,511 | 100.00% | 55 |
| Rejected Votes | 21,952 | | | 13,403 | | | 16,727 | | | | 52,082 | | |
| Total Polled | 539,980 | | | 301,634 | | | 394,979 | | | | 1,236,593 | | |
| Registered Electors | 761,815 | | | 421,186 | | | 578,858 | | | | 1,761,859 | | |
| Turnout | 70.88% | | | 71.62% | | | 68.23% | | | | 70.19% | | |

=== Uva Province ===
The Uva Provincial Council was prematurely dissolved on 29 May 2009 by governor Nanda Mathew. The term of the council was due to expire in August. The Election Commissioner subsequently announced that nominations will be received from June 17 to June 23, to elect 21 members from the Badulla District and 11 members from the Monaragala District. After the close of nominations, the date of the elections was announced as 8 August 2009.

Results of the 5th Uva provincial council election held on 8 August 2009:

| Party / Alliance | Badulla | | | Monaragala | | | Bonus Seats | Total | | |
| Party / Alliance | Votes | % | Seats | Votes | % | Seats | Bonus Seats | Votes | % | Seats |
|---|---|---|---|---|---|---|---|---|---|---|
| United People's Freedom Alliance | 259,069 | 67.79% | 14 | 159,837 | 81.32% | 9 | 2 | 418,906 | 72.39% | 25 |
| United National Party | 98,635 | 25.81% | 5 | 30,509 | 15.52% | 2 | | 129,144 | 22.32% | 7 |
| Janatha Vimukthi Peramuna | 9,007 | 2.36% | 1 | 5,632 | 2.87% | 0 | | 14,639 | 2.53% | 1 |
| Up-Country People's Front | 9,227 | 2.41% | 1 | | | | | 9,227 | 1.59% | 1 |
| Sri Lanka Muslim Congress | 4,150 | 1.09% | 0 | | | | | 4,150 | 0.72% | 0 |
| United National Alliance | 503 | 0.13% | 0 | | | | | 503 | 0.09% | 0 |
| Democratic Unity Alliance | 481 | 0.13% | 0 | | | | | 481 | 0.08% | 0 |
| National Development Front | 247 | 0.06% | 0 | 226 | 0.11% | 0 | | 473 | 0.08% | 0 |
| United Socialist Party | 276 | 0.07% | 0 | 153 | 0.08% | 0 | | 429 | 0.07% | 0 |
| Independents | 337 | 0.09% | 0 | 90 | 0.05% | 0 | | 427 | 0.07% | 0 |
| United Lanka Great Council | 56 | 0.01% | 0 | 62 | 0.03% | 0 | | 118 | 0.02% | 0 |
| Janasetha Peramuna | 67 | 0.02% | 0 | | | | | 67 | 0.01% | 0 |
| Patriotic National Front | 44 | 0.01% | 0 | 20 | 0.01% | 0 | | 64 | 0.01% | 0 |
| Sri Lanka Progressive Front | 31 | 0.01% | 0 | 10 | 0.01% | 0 | | 41 | 0.01% | 0 |
| Sinhalaye Mahasammatha Bhoomiputra Pakshaya | 30 | 0.01% | 0 | 10 | 0.01% | 0 | | 40 | 0.01% | 0 |
| Valid Votes | 382,160 | 100.00% | 21 | 196,549 | 100.00% | 11 | 2 | 578,709 | 100.00% | 34 |
| Rejected Votes | 24,455 | | | 9,969 | | | | 34,424 | | |
| Total Polled | 406,615 | | | 206,518 | | | | 613,133 | | |
| Registered Electors | 574,814 | | | 300,642 | | | | 875,456 | | |
| Turnout | 70.74% | | | 68.69% | | | | 70.04% | | |

=== Western Province ===
Summary of the April 24, 2009 Sri Lanka Western Provincial Council election results
| Party | Colombo | | Gampaha | | Kaluthara | | Seats | | | Popular Vote | |
| Party | Votes | Seats | Votes | Seats | Votes | Seats | 2004 | 2009 | +/− | Vote | % |
|---|---|---|---|---|---|---|---|---|---|---|---|
| United People's Freedom Alliance | 530,370 | 25 | 624,530 | 27 | 351,215 | 14 | 59 | ^{[1]}68 | +9 | 1,506,115 | 64.73% |
| United National Party | 327,571 | 15 | 236,256 | 10 | 124,426 | 5 | 39 | 30 | −9 | 688,253 | 29.58% |
| Janatha Vimukthi Peramuna | 21,787 | 1 | 21,491 | 1 | 13,106 | 1 | ^{[2]}0 | 3 | +3 | 56,384 | 2.43% |
| Sri Lanka Muslim Congress | 18,978 | 1 | 18,014 | 1 | 12,396 | 0 | 4 | 2 | −2 | 49,388 | 2.12% |
| Democratic Unity Alliance | 8,584 | 1 | 1,424 | 0 | 1,962 | 0 | 1 | 1 | 0 | 11,970 | 0.51% |
| Total | 957,035 | 43 | 932,360 | 39 | 526,484 | 20 | 104 | 104 | 0 | 2,415,879 | 100% |
Voter turnout: 63.24%
Source: Sri Lanka Department of Elections Notes: 1. Includes 2 bonus seats; 2. Contested in 2004 as part of the UPFA
