= Democratic Unity Alliance =

Democratic Unity Alliance ஜனநாயக ஐக்கிய முன்னணி
- Secretary-General: Z. M. Hithayathulla
- Founder: Naseer Ahamed Zainulabdeen
- Founded: June 2004
- Split from: Sri Lanka Muslim Congress
- Ideology: Muslim minority politics
- Local Government: 5 / 8,356

Election symbol
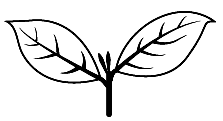
- Two Leaves

The Democratic Unity Alliance (Tamil: ஜனநாயக ஐக்கிய முன்னணி Caṉanāyaka Oṉṟumaik Kūṭṭaṇi) is a registered political party in Sri Lanka. It was founded in 2004 after Naseer Ahamed Zainulabdeen and others broke away from the Sri Lanka Muslim Congress.

== Electoral history ==
Sri Lanka Provincial Elections
Election year	Votes	Vote %	Seats won
2004 (Note: Elections held across 7 provincial councils)	6,219	0.11%	1 / 380
2008–09 (Note: Elections held across 8 provincial councils)	12,512	0.15%	1 / 417
2013 (Note: Elections held across 3 provincial councils)	826	0.03%	0 / 148
2013 (Note: Elections held only in the Uva provincial council)	5,045	0.74%	0 / 34
