= Mangalan Master =

Mangalan Master is the nom de guerre of a candidate for the TMVP contesting Polonnaruwa District for the United People's Freedom Alliance in Sri Lanka. He is a former LTTE cadre, third in line for TMVP leadership after defecting to the party of Colonel Karuna and a staunch Karuna partisan during intra-TMVP feuds. The LTTE made an attempt on his life with claymore bombs in 2005.
