= Conscription in Sri Lanka =

Conscription in Sri Lanka has never been implemented in modern times, with its armed forces and auxiliary forces remaining all volunteer during World War I, World War II and the Sri Lankan Civil War. The Mobilization and Supplementary Forces Act, No. 40 of 1985 gives the Sri Lankan Government the powers to issue a A National Service Order to enlist persons in the National Armed Reserve.

During the Sri Lankan Civil War, non-state sanctioned conscription was carried out by the LTTE in areas under its control, including conscription of children.

== See also ==
- Military service
- Recruit training
- Alternative service
