= Edwin Krishnanandarajah =

Sri Lankan politician

Edwin Krishnanandarajah (Tamil: எட்வின் கிருஷ்ணாநந்தராஜா; alias Pradeep Master) is the head of the Tamil Makkal Viduthalai Pulikal's political wing in Sri Lanka.
