= Eastern Provincial Council =

Provincial council in Sri Lanka

Eastern Provincial Council கிழக்கு மாகாண சபை නැගෙනහිර පළාත් සභාව
- 2nd Eastern Provincial Council

Type
- Type: Unicameral

Leadership
- Chairman: Ariyawathi Galappaththy, UPFA since 1 October 2012
- Deputy Chairman: M. S. Subair, UPFA since 1 October 2012
- Chief Minister: A. N. Zainulabdeen, SLMC since 6 February 2015
- Leader of the Opposition: S. Thandayuthapani, TNA since 28 September 2012
- Chief Secretary: Thusitha P Wanigasinghe since 16 December 2019

Structure
- Seats: 37
- Political groups: Government (22): UPFA (14); SLMC (7); NFF (1); Opposition (15): TNA (11); UNP (4)

Elections
- Last election: 8 September 2012

Meeting place
- Provincial Council Assembly Hall, Assembly Secretariat, Trincomalee

Website
- ep.gov.lk

The Eastern Provincial Council (EPC Tamil: கிழக்கு மாகாண சபை Kiḻakku Mākāṇa Capai; Sinhala: නැගෙනහිර පළාත් සභාව “Nagenahira Palat Sabava”; EPC) is the provincial council for the Eastern Province in Sri Lanka. In accordance with the Sri Lankan constitution, EPC has legislative power over a variety of matters including agriculture, education, health, housing, local government, planning, road transport and social services. The constitution also gives it powers over police and land but successive central governments have refused to devolve these powers to the provinces. EPC has 37 members elected using the open list proportional representation system.

== History ==
In an attempt to end the Sri Lankan Civil War the Indo-Lanka Accord was signed on 29 July 1987. One of the requirements of the accord was that the Sri Lankan government should devolve powers to the provinces. Accordingly on 14 November 1987 the Sri Lankan Parliament passed the 13th Amendment to the Constitution of Sri Lanka and the Provincial Councils Act No 42 of 1987. On 3 February 1988 nine provincial councils were created by order. The first elections for provincial councils took place on 28 April 1988 in North Central, North Western, Sabaragamuwa, and Uva provinces. On 2 June 1988 elections were held for provincial councils for Central, Southern and Western provinces.

The Indo-Lanka Accord also required the merger of the Eastern and Northern provinces into one administrative unit. The accord required a referendum to be held by 31 December 1988 in the Eastern Province to decide whether the merger should be permanent. Crucially, the accord allowed the Sri Lankan president to postpone the referendum at his discretion. On September 2 and 8 1988 President Jayewardene issued proclamations enabling the Eastern and Northern provinces to be one administrative unit administered by one elected council, creating the North Eastern Province. Elections in the newly merged North Eastern Province were held on 19 November 1988. The Eelam People's Revolutionary Liberation Front, an Indian backed paramilitary group, won control of the North Eastern provincial council.

On 1 March 1990, just as the Indian Peace Keeping Force were preparing to withdraw from Sri Lanka, Annamalai Varatharajah Perumal, Chief Minister of the North Eastern Province, moved a motion in the North Eastern Provincial Council declaring an independent Eelam. President Premadasa reacted to Permual's UDI by dissolving the provincial council and imposing direct rule on the province.

The proclamations issued by President Jayewardene in September 1988 merging the Northern and Eastern provinces were only meant to be a temporary measure until a referendum was held in the Eastern Province on a permanent merger between the two provinces. However, the referendum was never held and successive Sri Lankan presidents issued proclamations annually extending the life of the "temporary" entity. The merger was bitterly opposed by Sri Lankan nationalists. The combined North Eastern Province occupied one third of Sri Lanka. The thought of the rebel Tamil Tigers controlling this province, directly or indirectly, alarmed them greatly. On 14 July 2006, after a long campaign against the merger, the Janatha Vimukthi Peramuna filed three separate petitions with the Supreme Court of Sri Lanka requesting a separate Provincial Council for the East. On 16 October 2006 the Supreme Court ruled that the proclamations issued by President Jayewardene were null and void and had no legal effect. The North Eastern Province was formally de-merged into the Eastern and Northern provinces on 1 January 2007. The Eastern province was ruled directly from Colombo until 10 May 2008 when elections were held.

== Chairmen, deputy chairmen, chief ministers, leaders of the opposition and chief secretaries ==
Chairmen

- Ajju Mohamed Mohamed Faiz, UPFA (2008-)
- Ariyawathi Galappaththy, UPFA-SLFP (2012-present)

Deputy Chairmen

- M. K. D. S. Gunawardena, UPFA-SLFP (2008-)
- M. S. Subair, UPFA-ACMC (2012-present)

Chief Ministers

- S. Chandrakanthan, UPFA-TMVP (2008-12)
- M. N. Abdul Majeed, UPFA-SLFP (2012-2015)
- Ahamed Nazeer Zainulabdeen, SLMC (2015-present)

Leaders of the Opposition

- Basheer Segu Dawood, UNP-SLMC
- Daya Gamage, UNP
- S. Thandayuthapani, TNA-ITAK (2012-present)

Chief Secretaries

- R. Thiakalingam, (2007)
- H. M. Herath Abeyweera, (2007)
- V. P. Balasingam, (2008-12)
- D. M. S. Abeygunawardena, (2012-2019)
- Thusitha P Wanigasinghe, (2019-present)

== Election results ==
=== 2008 provincial council election ===
Results of the 1st Eastern provincial council election held on 10 May 2008
Alliances and parties	Ampara			Batticaloa			Trincomalee			Bonus Seats	Total		
Alliances and parties	Votes	%	Seats	Votes	%	Seats	Votes	%	Seats	Bonus Seats	Votes	%	Seats
United People's Freedom Alliance (ACMC, NC, SLFP, TMVP et al.)	144,247	52.96%	8	105,341	58.09%	6	59,298	42.99%	4	2	308,886	52.21%	20
United National Party (SLMC, UNP)	121,272	44.52%	6	58,602	32.31%	4	70,858	51.37%	5	0	250,732	42.38%	15
Janatha Vimukthi Peramuna	4,745	1.74%	0	379	0.21%	0	4,266	3.09%	1	0	9,390	1.59%	1
Tamil Democratic National Alliance (EPRLF(P), PLOTE, TULF et al.)				7,714	4.25%	1				0	7,714	1.30%	1
Eelam People's Democratic Party				5,418	2.99%	0				0	5,418	0.92%	0
Independent Groups	737	0.27%	0	823	0.45%	0	1,073	0.78%	0	0	2,633	0.45%	0
United Socialist Party	296	0.11%	0	943	0.52%	0	1,309	0.95%	0	0	2,548	0.43%	0
Eelavar Democratic Front (EROS)				1,816	1.00%	0	459	0.33%	0	0	2,275	0.38%	0
United National Alliance	597	0.22%	0							0	597	0.10%	0
People's Front of Liberation Tigers	63	0.02%	0	157	0.09%	0	163	0.12%	0	0	383	0.06%	0
All Lanka Tamil United Front							378	0.27%	0	0	378	0.06%	0
New Sinhala Heritage	312	0.11%	0							0	312	0.05%	0
National Development Front	100	0.04%	0				89	0.06%	0	0	189	0.03%	0
Sinhalaye Mahasammatha Bhoomiputra Pakshaya	11	0.00%	0	85	0.05%	0	13	0.01%	0	0	109	0.02%	0
Muslim Liberation Front				39	0.02%	0				0	39	0.01%	0
Sri Lanka National Front				21	0.01%	0	9	0.01%	0	0	30	0.01%	0
Sri Lanka Progressive Front				17	0.01%	0	9	0.01%	0	0	26	0.00%	0
Ruhuna People's Party	9	0.00%	0				5	0.00%	0	0	14	0.00%	0
Liberal Party	3	0.00%	0							0	3	0.00%	0
Valid Votes	272,392	100.00%	14	181,355	100.00%	11	137,929	100.00%	10	2	591,676	100.00%	37
Rejected Votes	20,997			21,088			12,695				54,780		
Total Polled	293,389			202,443			150,624				646,456		
Registered Electors	409,308			330,950			242,463				982,721		
Turnout	71.68%			61.17%			62.12%				65.78%		

=== 2012 provincial council election ===
Results of the 2nd Eastern Provincial Council election held on 8 September 2012
Alliances and parties	Ampara			Batticaloa			Trincomalee			Bonus Seats	Total		
Alliances and parties	Votes	%	Seats	Votes	%	Seats	Votes	%	Seats	Bonus Seats	Votes	%	Seats
United People's Freedom Alliance (ACMC, NC, SLFP, TMVP et al.)	92,530	33.66%	5	64,190	31.17%	4	43,324	28.38%	3	2	200,044	31.58%	14
Tamil National Alliance (EPRLF (S), ITAK, PLOTE, TELO, TULF)	44,749	16.28%	2	104,682	50.83%	6	44,396	29.08%	3	0	193,827	30.59%	11
Sri Lanka Muslim Congress	83,658	30.43%	4	23,083	11.21%	1	26,176	17.15%	2	0	132,917	20.98%	7
United National Party	48,028	17.47%	3	2,434	1.18%	0	24,439	16.01%	1	0	74,901	11.82%	4
Independent Groups	1,178	0.43%	0	9,019	4.38%	0	2,164	1.42%	0	0	12,361	1.95%	0
National Freedom Front							9,522	6.24%	1	0	9,522	1.50%	1
Janatha Vimukthi Peramuna	2,305	0.84%	0	72	0.03%	0	777	0.51%	0	0	3,154	0.50%	0
Eelavar Democratic Front (EROS)	531	0.19%	0	1,777	0.86%	0	385	0.25%	0	0	2,693	0.43%	0
Socialist Alliance (CPSL, DLF, LSSP)	1,489	0.54%	0	379	0.18%	0	612	0.40%	0	0	2,480	0.39%	0
All Lanka Tamil United Front	76	0.03%	0				384	0.25%	0	0	460	0.07%	0
United Socialist Party	103	0.04%	0	37	0.02%	0	149	0.10%	0	0	289	0.05%	0
Sri Lanka Labour Party	111	0.04%	0	50	0.02%	0	107	0.07%	0	0	268	0.04%	0
Our National Front				163	0.08%	0				0	163	0.03%	0
United Lanka Great Council	10	0.00%	0	15	0.01%	0	97	0.06%	0	0	122	0.02%	0
United Lanka People's Party	74	0.03%	0	16	0.01%	0				0	90	0.01%	0
Jana Setha Peramuna	31	0.01%	0	19	0.01%	0	35	0.02%	0	0	85	0.01%	0
Patriotic National Front	7	0.00%	0				78	0.05%	0	0	85	0.01%	0
Muslim Liberation Front	42	0.02%	0				15	0.01%	0	0	57	0.01%	0
Ruhuna People's Party	13	0.00%	0				3	0.00%	0	0	16	0.00%	0
Valid Votes	274,935	100.00%	14	205,936	100.00%	11	152,663	100.00%	10	2	633,534	100.00%	37
Rejected Votes	16,744			17,223			11,324				45,291		
Total Polled	291,679			223,159			163,987				678,825		
Registered Electors	441,287			347,099			245,363				1,033,749		
Turnout	66.10%			64.29%			66.83%				65.67%		
