= M. Nadarajah =

Sri Lankan politician

Honourable M. Nadarajah MPC

Member of the Eastern Provincial Council for Batticaloa District
- Incumbent
- Assumed office 2012

Personal details
- Party: Illankai Tamil Arasu Kachchi
- Other political affiliations: Tamil National Alliance
- Ethnicity: Sri Lankan Tamil

Markandu Nadarajah is a Sri Lankan Tamil politician and provincial councillor.

Nadarajah contested the 2012 provincial council election as one of the Tamil National Alliance's candidates in Batticaloa District and was elected to the Eastern Provincial Council (EPC). A few days after the election some TNA councillors including Nadarajah were threatened and coerced into joining the United People's Freedom Alliance but none of them gave into the threats. Nadarajah and the other newly elected TNA provincial councillors took their oaths on 28 September 2012 in front of TNA leader and Member of Parliament R. Sampanthan.
