= List of chief ministers of Eastern Province =

Chief Minister of Eastern Province
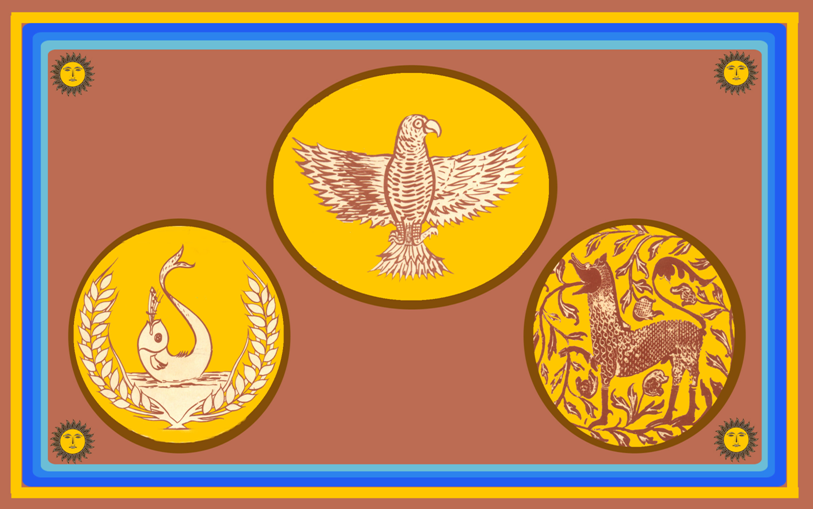
- Flag of Eastern Province
- Incumbent; Vacant since 30 September 2017
- Board of Ministers of the Eastern Province
- Style: The Honourable
- Member of: Eastern Provincial Council
- Appointer: Anuradha Yahampath
- Precursor: Chief Minister of the North Eastern Province
- Inaugural holder: S. Chandrakanthan
- Formation: 1 January 2007
- Website: Eastern Province Chief Minister's Secretariat

The chief minister of Eastern Province, Sri Lanka is the head of the provincial board of ministers, a body which aids and advises the governor, the head of the provincial government, in the exercise of his executive power. The governor appoints as chief minister the member of the Eastern Provincial Council who, in his opinion, commands the support of a majority of that council. The current chief minister is Ahamed Nazeer Zainulabdeen.

== Chief ministers ==
Tamil Makkal Viduthalai Pulikal Sri Lanka Freedom Party Sri Lanka Muslim Congress

No.	Name	Portrait	Party	Took office	Left office	Refs
	Vacant (Note: Governed directly by the Central government)			1 January 2007	16 May 2008	
1	Sivanesathurai Chandrakanthan		Tamil Makkal Viduthalai Pulikal	16 May 2008	18 September 2012	
2	M. N. Abdul Majeed		Sri Lanka Freedom Party	18 September 2012	6 February 2015	
3	Ahamed Nazeer Zainulabdeen		Sri Lanka Muslim Congress	6 February 2015	30 September 2017	
	Vacant (Note: Governed directly by the Central government)			30 September 2017		
