= S. Thandayuthapani =

Sri Lankan politician

Honourable S. Thandayuthapani MPC
- சி. தண்டாயுதபாணி

Minister of Education, Eastern Province
- Incumbent
- Assumed office 3 March 2015

Leader of the Opposition, Eastern Provincial Council
- In office 28 September 2012 – 3 March 2015

Member of the Eastern Provincial Council for Trincomalee District
- Incumbent
- Assumed office 2012

Personal details
- Born: 7 August 1950 (age 76)
- Party: Illankai Tamil Arasu Kachchi
- Other political affiliations: Tamil National Alliance
- Education: R. K. M. Sri Koneswara Vidyalayam
- Profession: Teacher
- Ethnicity: Sri Lankan Tamil

Singaravelu Thandayuthapani (Tamil: சிங்காரவேலு தண்டாயுதபாணி; born 7 August 1950) is a Sri Lankan Tamil teacher, civil servant, politician and provincial minister.

== Early life ==
Thandayuthapani was born on 7 August 1950 and educated at R. K. M. Sri Koneswara Vidyalayam. He graduated with a degree in economics before training to be a teacher at Palali Guru Vidyalayam.

== Career ==
Thandayuthapani was a school principal before becoming a Director of Education and Additional Director of Education. He served as Secretary to the Ministry of Lands, Land Development, Education and Culture (Eastern Province) between 2010 and 2011.

Thandayuthapani contested the 2012 provincial council election as one of the Tamil National Alliance's candidates in Trincomalee District and was elected to the Eastern Provincial Council (EPC). On 28 September 2012 the TNA leadership unanimously selected Thandayuthapani to be the Leader of the Opposition on the EPC. Thandayuthapani and the other newly elected TNA provincial councillors took their oaths on 28 September 2012 in front of TNA leader and Member of Parliament R. Sampanthan.

Following the 2015 presidential election an all party provincial government was formed in the Eastern Province. Thandayuthapani took his oath as Minister of Education in front of Governor Austin Fernando on 3 March 2015.
