= Karuna Amman =

Sri Lankan politician, former LTTE fighter (born 1966)

Hon. Vinayagamoorthy Muralitharan MP

Member of Parliament for National List
- In office 7 October 2008 – 26 June 2015
- Preceded by: Wasantha Samarasinghe

Personal details
- Born: Vinayagamoorthy Muralitharan; 1966 (age 59–60) Kiran, Batticaloa District
- Party: Sri Lanka Freedom Party
- Other political affiliations: Tamil Makkal Viduthalai Pulikal (2004–2009)
- Spouse: Nira
- Children: 3
- Nickname: Colonel Karuna

Military service
- Allegiance: Liberation Tigers of Tamil Eelam; Government of Sri Lanka
- Years of service: 1983-2004, 2004-2009
- Unit: Karuna Group
- Commands: Leader, Karuna Group; LTTE Commander, Eastern Province

Vinayagamoorthy Muralitharan (nom de guerre: Colonel Karuna Amman; Tamil: விநாயகமூர்த்தி முரளிதரன், Vināyakamūrtti Muraḷitaraņ; born 22 June 1966) is a Sri Lankan politician and former militant. Formerly a fighter for the Tamil separatist group, the Liberation Tigers of Tamil Eelam (LTTE), for over 20 years, Muralitharan later rose to prominence after defecting from the LTTE and forming the Tamil Makkal Viduthalai Pulikal (TMVP), a breakaway faction of the LTTE.

After giving up arms and entering politics, he was appointed as a National List Member of Parliament in 2008 for the ruling United People's Freedom Alliance (UPFA), the party of former President Mahinda Rajapaksa, and was sworn in as Minister of National Integration on 9 March 2009. He later joined the Sri Lanka Freedom Party (SLFP), the main constituent party of the UPFA, and on 24 April 2009 he was appointed as a Vice President of the SLFP.

== Militant life ==
Muralitharan was born in Kiran, a village in the Batticaloa district in eastern Sri Lanka to Vinayagamoorthy who was an agriculturist. He joined the LTTE in 1983 and became a top commander in the Eastern Province. He was formerly a bodyguard to LTTE leader Velupillai Prabhakaran.

=== Breakaway from the LTTE ===
On 26 July 2004, Karuna broke away from the Tamil Tigers after he alleged they were ignoring the interests of the eastern Tamil people, and claimed to have renounced violence. The move by Karuna to break away from the LTTE and renounce armed struggle was considered one of the major turning points of the Sri Lankan Civil War that would eventually bring about the end of the 25 year-long conflict. Muralitharan joined forces with the Sri Lanka Armed Forces to capture LTTE bases. It has been claimed that the former Deputy Minister Seyed Ali Zahir Moulana was instrumental in convincing Karuna to renounce militarism, who in turn joined the government.

The LTTE claimed that the real reason for Karuna's defection was because the LTTE's intelligence wing was closing in on him for alleged financial and personal misconduct, terming his break a "temporary aberration". The Tigers reacted to his defection by launching attacks against Muralitharan's forces, and heavy clashes ensued. They claimed to have fully evicted his forces from the area he controlled by mid-2004.

However Karuna's group, dubbed the Karuna Faction by the media, continued to maintain a stronghold in the southeast of Sri Lanka with a force estimated to number a few hundred. The group regularly got into clashes with the LTTE. In 2006, the Sri Lankan Armed Forces launched a major campaign to evict the LTTE from the east of the country, with the assistance of the Karuna Faction. Together the coalition succeeded in clearing the east of Sri Lanka by July 2007.

Karuna has alleged that Prabhakaran intentionally dragged out peace talks with Sri Lanka to give rebels additional time to re-arm for further combat. He said that the LTTE lost about 70% of its fighting capacity due the TMVP separating from the LTTE.

In March 2007, Colonel Karuna, accompanied by Supreme Commander Pillaiyan, Senior Commander Jeyam and other TVMP officials spent two days at a TMVP base in the east. A number of his statements there were widely reported.

At the same time, the TMVP announced that it was setting up a "special attack force" and a "spy attack force". Internal cohesion within the TMVP has been a problem in the past before, particularly disagreements between Pillaiyan and Karuna over finance. Between May–June, a number of cadres were killed in inter-factional clashes, most notably an intelligence operative named Senthujan Senthamorthanan. Another TMVP cadre named Seelan was also badly beaten but luckily escaped. Pillaiyan was reportedly targeted as well but escaped to Trincomalee with about 200 supporters, although he has since reconciled with Karuna.

=== Allegations of human rights violations ===
Colonel Karuna was the LTTE head of the Eastern Province in 1990 when 600 unarmed police officers who surrendered to the group were subsequently massacred.

When Colonel Karuna was part of the LTTE, he was also involved in the massacre of Muslims, including the Kattankudy and Eravur massacres in the Eastern Province. LTTE sympathizers, following Karuna's defection, often claim that the crimes he committed while under the LTTE were his personal responsibility and not "LTTE crimes".

RSF (Reporters Without Borders) has accused him of muzzling local journalists by forming death squads to silence those who oppose his views.

His armed groups have been blamed for the increasing involuntary disappearances of civilians in the Jaffna peninsula by several human rights groups. They have also been accused of taking part in death squad activity against civilians. Additionally, they are also accused of child soldier recruitment by UNICEF, Human Rights Watch, and others. A report by the United States Department of State claims that Karuna's group "was believed also to have killed 20 civilians."

Karuna has categorically denied these allegations in interviews, claiming the LTTE is trying to discredit his party.

=== Imprisonment in the United Kingdom ===
Karuna was arrested in London on 2 November 2007, following a joint operation between the Metropolitan Police and the Border and Immigration Agency. It is thought that Karuna was found in possession of a forged passport and firearms. According to the Sunday Times, a weekly English newspaper published in Sri Lanka, the British authorities claimed that they had enough evidence to show that the Sri Lankan government was complicit in helping Karuna receive a diplomatic passport.

Karuna confessed in court that the government, through permanent Secretary of Defense Gotabaya Rajapaksa, had given him the passport. On 25 January 2008, he was sentenced to nine months in prison. He was transferred to an immigration detention centre in May 2008.

A number of human rights groups, led by Amnesty International, urged the Metropolitan Police to investigate Karuna for war crimes including torture, hostage-taking and recruitment of child soldiers. The Met Police did not respond and Karuna returned to Sri Lanka on 3 July 2008.

=== Role in the defeat of the LTTE ===
In an interview with The Washington Post in 2009, Karuna stated:

“All the world knows that without me, they couldn’t win the war. I know all the hideouts and tactics. And without my manpower, the Tigers lost their grip. That’s why I am world-famous."

According to Sri Lanka's chief of National Intelligence, the wealth of intelligence on the LTTE gained from Karuna's defection was "pure gold". A Sri Lanka Army commander later told Karuna in July 2010 that he was a more significant threat than Prabhakaran and the real mastermind behind the LTTE but also "a real hero because without you we would not have won the war".

== Political career ==
Upon his return to Sri Lanka, Karuna entered democratic politics and joined the SLFP alongside 1750 other ex-LTTE members. Karuna praised then-incumbent president Mahinda Rajapaksa, claiming that the Black July riots would not have happened if Rajapaksa was in power during the period. Karuna was then sworn in as Minister of National Integration.

=== COVID-19 speech controversy ===
On 19 June 2020, Karuna made a publicity stunt by making a revelation that he was even more cruel and merciless than the COVID-19 virus saying "I am more dangerous than the coronavirus. Corona killed 11 people but I killed 2000-3000 soldiers within one day." His insensible comments drew widespread criticism from political fraternity calling him a barbarian and he was summoned to appear before the Criminal Investigation Department to record statements according to the order by acting DGP C. D. Wickramaratne.

Karuna later claimed that his speech was edited by the media and that he never made such comments. The UN Human Rights Commission called upon the government to start further investigations regarding Karuna's former alleged war crimes, however, the Karuna and the TMVP were close allies with the SLPP, the ruling party, which defended Karuna.

Karuna went through few trials by the courts. Several groups brought evidence of massacres he is said to have caused. Karuna called the incident a plot by the UNP, a prominent opposition party, to destroy the reputation of the TMVP and the Sri Lanka People's Freedom Alliance.

=== UK sanctions ===
Following submissions by International Truth and Justice Project, in March 2025, the Government of the United Kingdom imposed travel sanctions, former Commander of the Army Shavendra Silva and Jagath Jayasuriya, former Commander of the Navy Wasantha Karannagoda and Karuna Amman as part of what the Foreign office called "UK travel bans and asset freezes, target individuals responsible for a range of violations and abuses, such as extrajudicial killings, during the civil war". The Ministry of Foreign Affairs said that this was a unilateral action taken by the UK government and such action does not assist but serve to complicate the national reconciliation process underway in Sri Lanka and went on to say human rights violations in the past need to handle by domestic accountability mechanisms. The Wartime President Mahinda Rajapaksa rejected UK governments allegations of human rights violations, stating "We waged war only against the LTTE and not against the Tamil people".

== See also ==
- Militant use of children in Sri Lanka
