= Naseer Ahamed Zainulabdeen =

Sri Lankan politician (born 1961)

Hon. Naseer Ahamed Governor
- නසීර් අහමඩ් நஸீர் அஹமட்
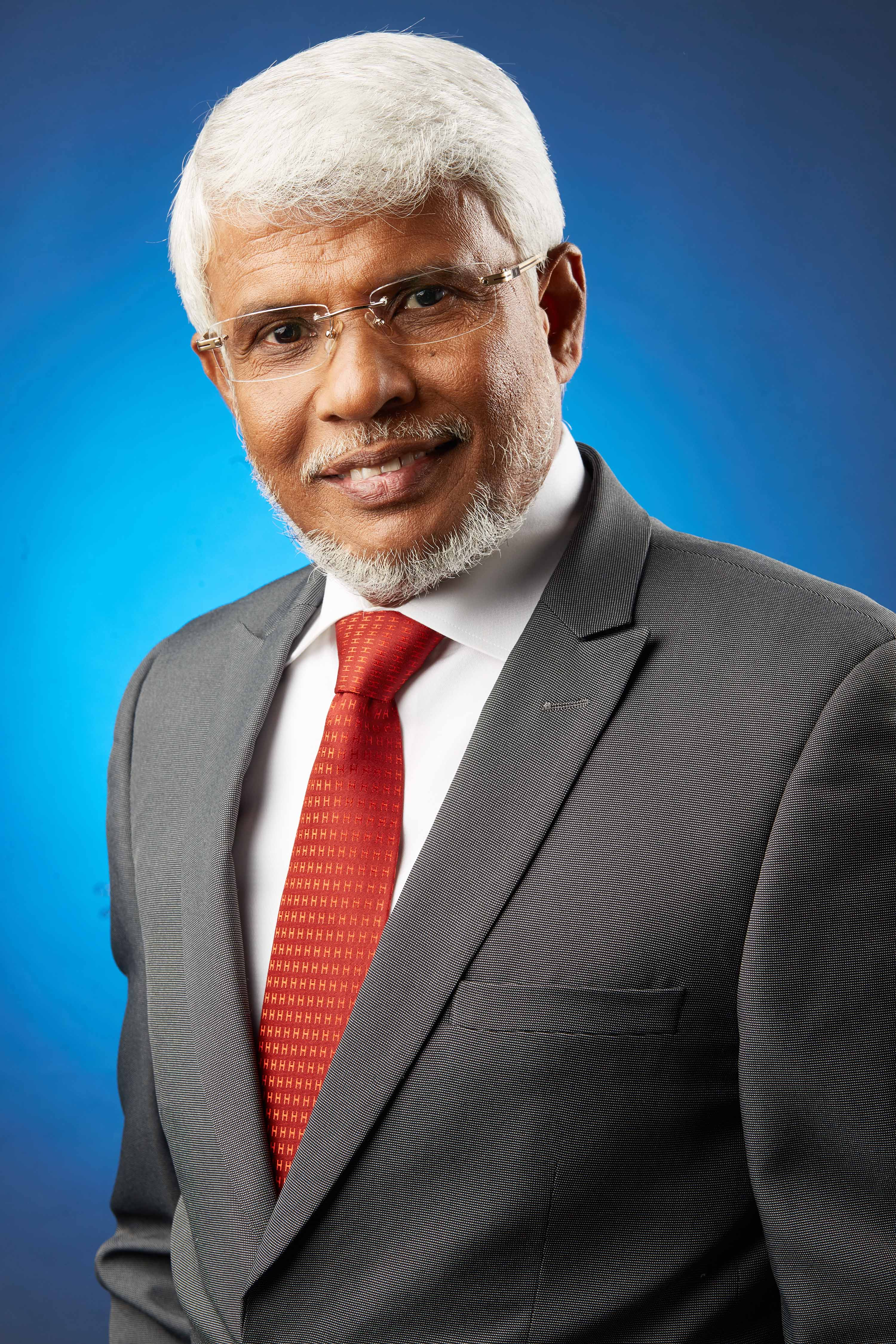

Governor of the North Western Province
- In office 2 May 2024 – 25 September 2024
- President: Ranil Wickremesinghe
- Prime Minister: Dinesh Gunawardena
- Preceded by: Lakshman Yapa Abeywardena
- Succeeded by: Tissa Kumarasiri

Minister of Environment
- In office 18 April 2022 – 6 October 2023
- President: Ranil Wickremesinghe
- Prime Minister: Dinesh Gunawardena
- Preceded by: Mahinda Amaraweera
- Succeeded by: Keheliya Rambukwella

Member of Parliament for Batticaloa District
- In office 20 August 2020 – 6 October 2023
- Succeeded by: Seyed Ali Zahir Moulana

3rd Chief Minister of the Eastern Province
- In office 6 February 2015 – 30 September 2017
- Governor: Austin Fernando
- Preceded by: M. N. Abdul Majeed

Eastern Provincial Minister of Agriculture, Animal Production & Development, Rural Industries Development Production, Fisheries and Tourism
- In office September 2012 – February 2015
- Governor: Mohan Wijewickrama
- Chief Minister: M. N. Abdul Majeed

Member of the Eastern Provincial Council
- In office September 2012 – September 2017
- Constituency: Batticaloa District

Presidential Adviser
- In office 2007–2010
- President: Mahinda Rajapaksa

Personal details
- Born: 16 April 1961 (age 65) Eravur, Dominion of Ceylon
- Party: Independent (since 2023)
- Other political affiliations: Sri Lanka Muslim Congress (1994–2023); Democratic Unity Alliance (2003–2012); National Unity Alliance (2004–2014)
- Education: King Fahd University of Petroleum and Minerals And Royal College, Colombo
- Occupation: Politician / Businessman
- Profession: Engineer (B.S in Electrical Engineering from KFUPM)

Naseer Ahamed Zainulabdeen (born 16 April 1961) is a Sri Lankan politician. Naseer Ahamed has been active in Sri Lankan politics since 1994, having held various positions such as Minister of Environment, Member of Parliament from the Batticaloa district, Governor of the North Western Province, Chief Minister of the Eastern Province and more.

== Early life and education ==
Ahamed pursued a Bachelor of Science in Electrical Engineering at King Fahd University of Petroleum and Minerals (KFUPM) in Dhahran, Saudi Arabia. Ahamed graduated with Honours from KFUPM in 1990, having completed his research on the analysis of tapered wave guide by splitting the non-uniform structure into uniform structures.

== Political career ==
Naseer Ahamed entered politics in 1994 and began his political career as Director of international relations and Member of the High Command of the Sri Lanka Muslim Congress (SLMC), under the leadership of SLMC founder M. H. M. Ashraff. Ahamed was also appointed as Director of international relations and Member of the High Command of the National Unity Alliance (NUA), Ashraff's newest political alliance.

Following Ashraff's death, Naseer Ahamed left the SLMC and NUA in 2003 and founded his own party, the Democratic Unity Alliance (DUA), where he served as leader. Former Governor A. J. M. Muzammil was the first to contest under DUA, and secured a seat from the Colombo District at the 2004 Western Provincial Council elections. Along with the Democratic Unity Alliance, Ahamed also formed the Muslim National Alliance (MNA), and served as the secretary general of the party.

Between 2007 and 2010, Ahamed served as an advisor to then-incumbent president Mahinda Rajapaksa during the final stages of the Sri Lankan civil war.

=== Eastern Provincial Council (2012–2017) ===
Ahamed secured a seat in the Eastern Provincial Council, contesting as a member of the SLMC. He was then appointed as Minister of Agriculture, Animal Production & Development, Rural Industries Development, Fisheries and Tourism of the Eastern Provincial Council.

In 2015, he was appointed as the Chief Minister of Eastern Province and Minister of Finance and Planning, Law & Order, Local Government & Regional Administration, Rural Development, Tourism & Environment, Building & Construction, Transport, Rural Industries and Housing.

=== Parliament of Sri Lanka (2020–2023) ===
Ahamed contested the 2020 parliamentary election as part of the SLMC and was elected to parliament from the Batticaloa district to the 16th Parliament of Sri Lanka.

=== Minister of Environment (2022–2023) ===
Ahamed was appointed as Minister of Environment in 2022 and was a member of the Cabinet of Sri Lanka.

Naseer Ahamed was appointed as special envoy of the president for Middle Eastern affairs. Ahamed conveyed messages from president Ranil Wickremesinghe to notable Arab leaders such as Crown Prince of Saudi Arabia Mohammed bin Salman and Sheikh Mohamed bin Zayed Al Nahyan of the United Arab Emirates.

Naseer Ahamed was also elected as President of the Sri Lanka–Saudi Arabia Parliamentary Friendship Association.

On 6 October 2023, Ahamed was dismissed from his seat and his ministerial portfolio after being expelled from the SLMC.

=== Governor of the North Western Province (2024) ===
On 2 May 2024, Ahamed was sworn in as Governor of the North Western Province by president Ranil Wickremesinghe. He resigned on 25 September 2024 following the election of Anura Kumara Dissanayake, Wickremesinghe's successor.
