= 2008 Sri Lanka Eastern Provincial Council election =

Provincial Council Election in Sri Lanka

2008 Sri Lanka Eastern Provincial Council elections
- 10 May 2008

All 37 seats to the Eastern Provincial Council
- Turnout: 65.78%
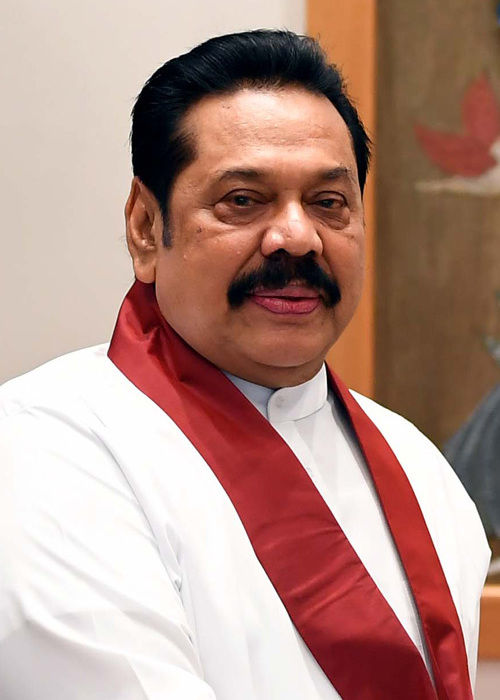

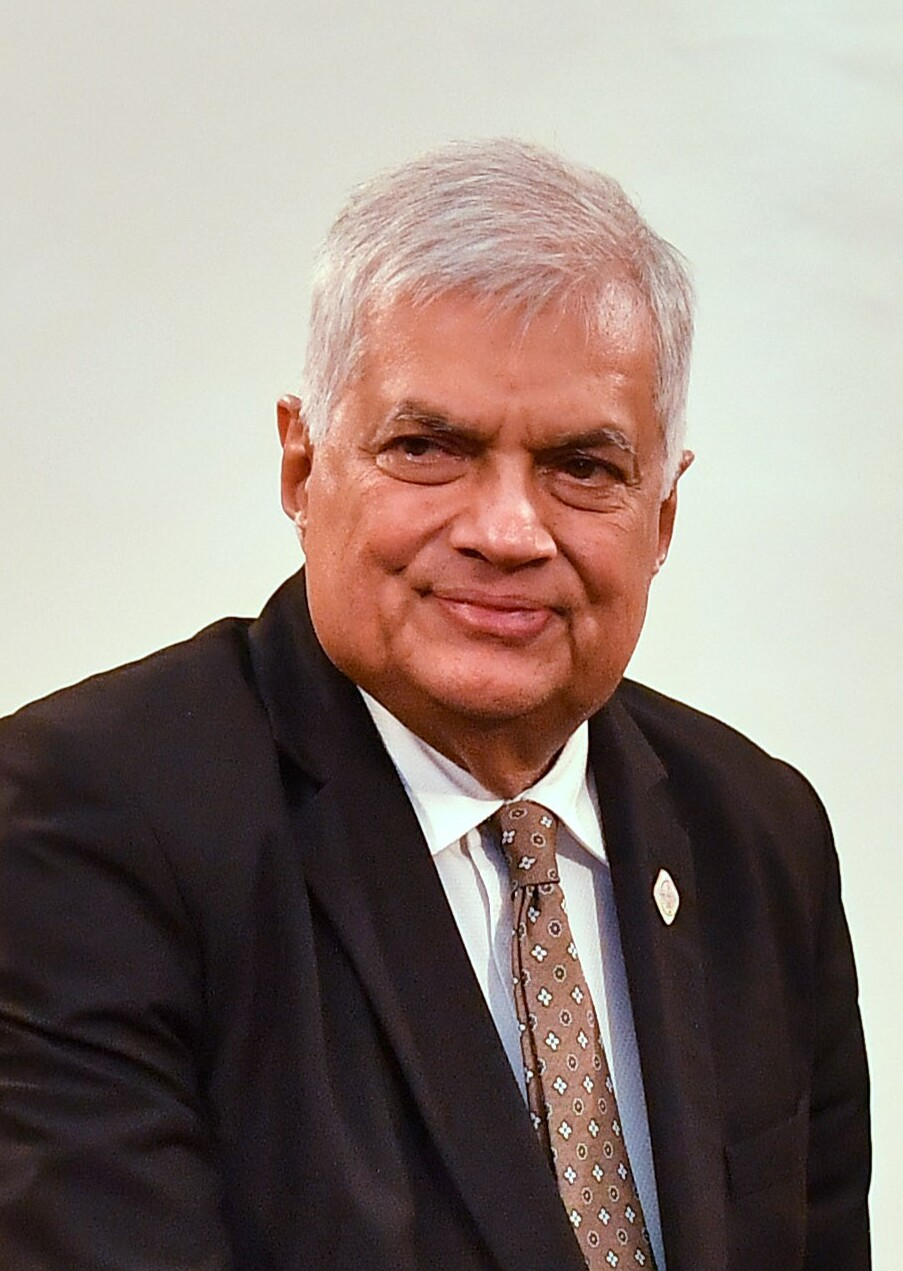
	First party	Second party
Leader	Mahinda Rajapaksa	Ranil Wickremesinghe
Party	UPFA	UNP
Seats won	20	15
Popular vote	308,886	250,732
Percentage	52.21%	42.38%
Chief Minister before election
Vacant
Elected Chief Minister
Sivanesathurai Chandrakanthan
UPFA (TMVP)

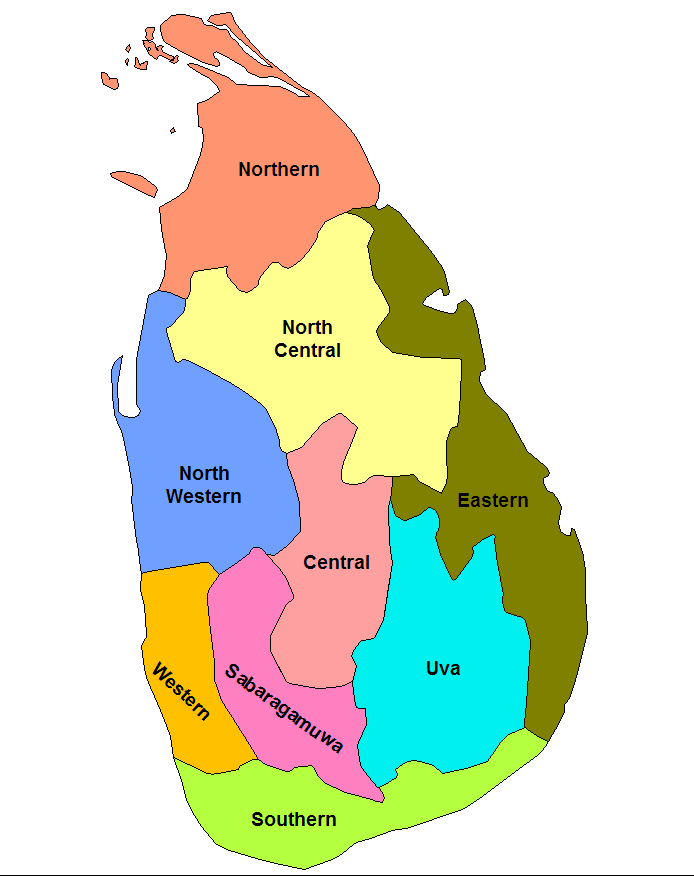
Sri Lanka's Eastern Province was demerged from the Northern Province in 2006

The Sri Lanka Eastern Provincial Council elections, 2008 was held on May 10, 2008 to elect members to Sri Lanka’s Eastern Provincial Council. Following the successful completion of local government elections in the Batticaloa District, Sri Lanka’s Elections Department announced on March 14 that the elections for the Eastern Provincial Council were to be held in May, after a lapse of 20 years. It was only the second time direct elections are held to select members for the council, and first time for the Eastern Provincial Council alone, after it was separated from the North-Eastern Provincial Council in 2006.

Nominations for contesting in the elections were accepted from March 27 to April 3, and a total of 1342 candidates from 18 political parties and 56 independent groups contested the elections where over 980,000 people were eligible to vote. Both of Sri Lanka’s major political parties, the opposition United National Party and the ruling United People's Freedom Alliance took part in the election in coalitions with a number of other parties, but under their own names.

According to the official results released by the Elections Department, the ruling UPFA were victorious in the election, winning 20 seats, while the opposition UNP won 15 seats. Two smaller parties, the Janatha Vimukthi Peramuna (JVP) and the Tamil Democratic National Alliance also won 1 seat each.

== Background ==
The Provincial Council system was first set up in Sri Lanka following the signing of the Indo-Sri Lanka Accord in 1987. Although Sri Lanka has 9 provinces, as part of the agreement the Northern and Eastern provinces were merged into a single North Eastern Province, and a joint North-Eastern Provincial Council formed. This was done following demands of Tamil political parties, who consider the north and east of Sri Lanka as their "traditional homeland", and wanted to administer the area as a single entity, against the protests of some members of the Sinhalese and Muslim communities.

The first elections were held for the North Eastern Provincial council on November 19, 1988. The Tamil nationalist parties Eelam People's Revolutionary Liberation Front (EPRLF) and Eelam National Democratic Liberation Front (ENDLF) won 35 and 12 seats respectively, while the Sri Lanka Muslim Congress (SLMC) won 17 seats and the ruling United National Party won one seat. Varatharaja Perumal was appointed Chief Minister by the victorious EPRLF, who also announced that they would form a ruling coalition with the ENDLF. However, as relations soured with India, and renewed fighting broke out between the government and the rebel Liberation Tigers of Tamil Eelam organization (the Tamil Tigers), the North-Eastern Provincial Council was dissolved in 1990 and its administration taken over by the government. The area was ruled by the government since then, with parts of it under the control of the Tamil Tigers. While fresh elections were held for the other 7 provincial councils in 1993, and subsequently every five years later, no elections were held for the North Eastern due to the situation on the ground.

Throughout the 1990s, control over parts of the province changed hands between the government and LTTE. When the ceasefire agreement was signed in 2002, parts of all 3 districts composing the Eastern Province were under the control of the LTTE. As the ceasefire broke down in mid-2006, the government launched a major military offensive to clear the Eastern Province of the LTTE. The Sri Lankan military fully achieving this objective in July 2007, and plans were immediately drawn up to hold local elections for the area. Elections were however delayed due to the unstable situation on the ground, as it was the first time in 14 years that some parts of the province came under the control of the government.

In the meantime, in a landmark decision the Supreme Court of Sri Lanka ruled on October 16, 2006 that since other conditions set the merger were not satisfied, the merger of the two provinces was "null and void without having any legal effect", thereby separating the administrative functions of the two provinces.

As a precursor to the Provincial Council elections, the government first held elections to local government bodies in the Batticaloa district on March 10, with the TamilEela Makkal Viduthalai Pulikal (TMVP) winning 8 of the 9 bodies up for grabs. (see official results)

== Details ==
The Eastern Province contains 15% of the landmass of Sri Lanka, and has a population of approximately 1.5 million people, or 7.8% of the country's population. Members for provincial councils are directly elected for 5-year terms. The leader of the council majority serves as the province's Chief Minister, alongside a board of ministers. A provincial governor is appointed by the President of Sri Lanka.

Voting to select members for the provincial councils took place between 7:00am and 4:00pm Sri Lankan time, at 1070 polling stations throughout the Eastern Province. A total of 37 members were to be elected to the Provincial Council, 14 from the Ampara District, 11 from the Batticaloa District and 10 from the Trincomalee District, with the overall winner gaining two additional "bonus" members. 79 counting centers were set up to tally the votes.

== Contesting political parties ==
The opposition United National Party (UNP) boycotted the Batticaloa local government elections in March claiming the existence of the armed TMVP cadres would prevent the holding of free and fair elections. This move was however criticized by some analysts, and the UNP also faced pressure from within the party to contest the Provincial Council Elections. Subsequently, the UNP announced on March 25 that they would be contesting the election.

The Sri Lanka Muslim Congress, the largest Muslim Party in the country, initially attempted to contest the elections as part of a larger coalition of Muslim parties. However discussions regarding this fell through, mainly because the parties could not agree on a symbol to contest under, with the SLMC insisting the alliance should use the “tree” symbol, a proposal the other parties were opposed to. On April 2, the SLMC announced they would contest the elections with the UNP, under the United National Party banner and the “elephant” symbol.

In a surprise move, SLMC leader and Member of Parliament Rauff Hakeem, along with 2 other SLMC MPs, Party Chairman Basheer Segudawood and General Secretary Hasen Ali also resigned from their seats in the national parliament on April 2, and announced they would be contesting in the Provincial Council Elections. At the same time, another senior member of the SLMC, M.L.A.M. Hisbullah crossed over to the government.

After discussions, the TMVP and the ruling United People's Freedom Alliance (UPFA) also announced on March 30 that they will jointly contest the polls under the UPFA's “betel leaf” symbol. After some arguments between the leading Muslim candidate M.L.A.M. Hisbullah, and the leading Tamil candidate and leader of the TMVP Pillayan as to who will be appointed Chief Minister if the UPFA won the election, the ruling party decided that whichever community won the most votes would be given the Chief Ministerial post.

The largest Tamil political party Tamil National Alliance totally boycotting these polls. United National party (UNP) and TNA groups claim unfair elections took place. TNA claimed it wasn't safe for them to operate in the east because the TMVP group was armed. TMVP threatened TNA MP's and also captured alive family members of TNA MP prior to the elections. Human rights groups claim that TMVP used violence before the election and therefore the elections were "tainted". An independent candidate also claimed that people voted out of fear for army backed TMVP.

=== Parties contesting in all 3 districts ===
Political Party	Symbol	Batticaloa	Ampara	Trincomalee
United People's Freedom Alliance	Betel Leaf	Y	Y	Y
United National Party	Elephant	Y	Y	Y
United Socialist Party	Tri-Shaw	Y	Y	Y
Janatha Vimukthi Peramuna	Bell	Y	Y	Y
People's Front of Liberation Tigers	Tiger	Y	Y	Y
Sinhalaye Mahasammatha Bhoomiputra Pakshaya	Aeroplane	Y	Y	Y

=== Parties contesting in 2 districts ===
Political Party	Symbol	Batticaloa	Ampara	Trincomalee
Eelavar Democratic Front	Plough	Y	-	Y
Sri Lanka National Front	Cricket Bat	Y	-	Y
Sri Lanka Progressive Front	Flower Vase	Y	-	Y
Jathika Sangwardena Peramuna	Coconut	-	Y	Y
Ruhunu Janatha Party	Motor Car	-	Y	Y

=== Parties contesting in 1 district ===
Political Party	Symbol	Batticaloa	Ampara	Trincomalee
Tamil Democratic National Alliance	Anchor	Y	-	-
Muslim Liberation Front	Butterfly	Y	-	-
Eelam People's Democratic Party	Veena	Y	-	-
Nawa Sihala Urumaya	Bow and Arrow	-	Y	-
United National Alliance	Swan	-	Y	-
The Liberal Party	Book	-	Y	-

In addition, there were 11 independent parties contesting in the Batticaloa District, 22 in the Ampara District and 19 in the Trincomalee District.

== Lead up to the elections ==
Despite some concerns that armed groups would disrupt the elections, the independent election monitoring group People's Action Front for Free and Fair Elections (PAFFREL) said that they did not see any evidence of any groups using arms during the campaigning. 10 days before the election, the chief of PAFFEREL Kingsley Rodrigo told the Daily Mirror that he expected to see a free and fair election.

There will also be 2,500 local and 20 internal polls monitors on the ground monitoring the elections.

There was a powerful bomb exploded at the town of Ampara on May 9, 2008 just a day before the elections, also 11 people killed and 36 sustained injuries. The suspected LTTE planted the bomb by targeting government military personnel that used this place as a resting place.

== Results ==
According to official results, the ruling United People's Freedom Alliance gained a majority in the Provincial Council, which was seen as a strike against the Tamil Tiger rebels. The UPFA won 20 seats (18 seats directly and two bonus seats for gaining the most votes overall), the opposition United National Party 15 seats and two smaller parties, the Janatha Vimukthi Peramuna and the Tamil Democratic National Alliance won one seat each.

Pillayan, a former rebel leader, was sworn in as Chief Minister of Eastern Province on 16 May 2008.

Summary of the May 10, 2008 Sri Lanka Eastern Provincial Council election results
Alliances and parties	Ampara			Batticaloa			Trincomalee			Bonus Seats	Total		
Alliances and parties	Votes	%	Seats	Votes	%	Seats	Votes	%	Seats	Bonus Seats	Votes	%	Seats
United People's Freedom Alliance (ACMC, NC, SLFP, TMVP et al.)	144,247	52.96%	8	105,341	58.09%	6	59,298	42.99%	4	2	308,886	52.21%	^{[1]}20
United National Party (SLMC, UNP)	121,272	44.52%	6	58,602	32.31%	4	70,858	51.37%	5	0	250,732	42.38%	15
Janatha Vimukthi Peramuna	4,745	1.74%	0	379	0.21%	0	4,266	3.09%	1	0	9,390	1.59%	1
Tamil Democratic National Alliance (EPRLF(P), PLOTE, TULF et al.)				7,714	4.25%	1				0	7,714	1.30%	1
Eelam People's Democratic Party				5,418	2.99%	0				0	5,418	0.92%	0
Independent Groups	737	0.27%	0	823	0.45%	0	1,073	0.78%	0	0	2,633	0.45%	0
United Socialist Party	296	0.11%	0	943	0.52%	0	1,309	0.95%	0	0	2,548	0.43%	0
Eelavar Democratic Front (EROS)				1,816	1.00%	0	459	0.33%	0	0	2,275	0.38%	0
United National Alliance	597	0.22%	0							0	597	0.10%	0
People's Front of Liberation Tigers	63	0.02%	0	157	0.09%	0	163	0.12%	0	0	383	0.06%	0
All Lanka Tamil United Front							378	0.27%	0	0	378	0.06%	0
New Sinhala Heritage	312	0.11%	0							0	312	0.05%	0
National Development Front	100	0.04%	0				89	0.06%	0	0	189	0.03%	0
Sinhalaye Mahasammatha Bhoomiputra Pakshaya	11	0.00%	0	85	0.05%	0	13	0.01%	0	0	109	0.02%	0
Muslim Liberation Front				39	0.02%	0				0	39	0.01%	0
Sri Lanka National Front				21	0.01%	0	9	0.01%	0	0	30	0.01%	0
Sri Lanka Progressive Front				17	0.01%	0	9	0.01%	0	0	26	0.00%	0
Ruhuna People's Party	9	0.00%	0				5	0.00%	0	0	14	0.00%	0
Liberal Party	3	0.00%	0							0	3	0.00%	0
Valid Votes	272,392	100.00%	14	181,355	100.00%	11	137,929	100.00%	10	2	591,676	100.00%	37
Rejected Votes	20,997			21,088			12,695				54,780		
Total Polled	293,389			202,443			150,624				646,456		
Registered Electors	409,308			330,950			242,463				982,721		
Turnout	71.68%			61.17%			62.12%				65.78%		
Source: Sri Lanka Department of Elections Archived 2012-02-19 at the Wayback Machine Notes: 1. Includes 2 bonus seats

== Claims of election irregularities ==
The United National Party, Sri Lanka Muslim Congress and the Janatha Vimukthi Peramuna claimed that many incidents of election irregularities such as vote rigging was carried out by members of the United People's Freedom Alliance and the TamilEela Makkal Viduthalai Pulikal during election day. The UNP and the SLMC has made a petition challenging the result of Ampara district PC to the supreme court.
