= People's Front of Liberation Tigers =

- Tamil name: விடுதலைப் புலிகள் மக்கள் முன்னணி
- Abbreviation: PFLT
- Leader: Mahattaya
- Secretary: Dilip "Yogi" Yogaratham
- Founder: Mahattaya
- Founded: 1989
- Dissolved: 2011
- Ideology: Tamil nationalism Separatism
- Political wing of: Liberation Tigers of Tamil Eelam

Election symbol
- Tiger

The People's Front of Liberation Tigers (Tamil: விடுதலைப் புலிகள் மக்கள் முன்னணி) was a political party in Sri Lanka founded in 1989 and the political wing of the Liberation Tigers of Tamil Eelam, a separatist Tamil militant group. Mahattaya was the founder and leader of the PFLT, and Dilip "Yogi" Yogaratnam was the general secretary.

The PFLT took part as an observer in the All Party Conference of 12 August 1989, and was prepared to participate in democratic elections. However, the PFLT would withdraw from all political processes as war erupted again.

In 1990, the PFLT held its first conference in Vaharai, Batticaloa District, from 24 February to 1 March. In the conference, the PFLT adopted a party manifesto and constitution. An estimate of 15,000 people took part in the conference. The PFLT's branches were dissolved by Prabhakaran in 1992 and its functions were taken over by the LTTE. In 1994 its leader Mahattaya was executed on accusations of plotting to assassinate Prabhakaran.

The party allegedly contested in the 2008 Eastern Provincial Council elections, but did not win any seats. The LTTE denounced its participation as a government ploy.

In August 2011, the party was reported to be deregistered.
