= Child soldiers in Sri Lanka =

Children recruited for military operations

Militant use of children in Sri Lanka has been an internationally recognized problem since the inception of the Sri Lankan civil war in 1983. The primary recruiters of under the age of 18 children are the rebel LTTE movement and the Karuna group, a break-away faction of the LTTE working with Sri Lanka Forces. Human Rights Watch criticized that threats and intimidation were used by the LTTE to force Tamil families in Sri Lanka to furnish children for military duty. When families reject, their children are sometimes kidnapped at night from their homes or forced recruited while walking to school. Parents who refuse to allow their children to be recruited suffer retaliation by the Tamil Tigers, which may include violence or detention.

== LTTE recruitment ==
Before 2007 the LTTE was accused of recruiting thousands of children into their ranks. Personal accounts from former child soldiers, including Kagusthan Ariaratnam, who was recruited as a minor while a student in Jaffna in 1991 and later served in the LTTE’s intelligence wing, highlight the broader pattern of underage enlistment reported during the conflict. The LTTE has been accused of knowingly recruiting and using child soldiers as front-line troops. Amid international pressure, LTTE announced in July 2003 that it would stop conscripting child soldiers, but both UNICEF and HRW have accused it of reneging on its promises, and of conscripting Tamil children orphaned by the 2004 Indian Ocean earthquake and tsunami. LTTE created 'orphanages' for children displaced in the fighting where they underwent indoctrination and recruitment. The Sirasu Puli (Leopard Brigade) was said to be composed entirely of children from these orphanages. UNICEF claimed that LTTE recruited at least 40 children orphaned by the tsunami. However, from the beginning of 2007 LTTE agreed to release all of the recruits under the age of 18. Human Rights Watch and Amnesty accused LTTE of re-recruiting Karuna's former cadres including child soldiers after Karuna's defection from the LTTE in 2004. The LTTE had threatened families that they would take children by force if they did not return, or that they would take other children or parents in their stead.

The LTTE routinely visited Tamil homes to inform parents that they must provide a child for the "movement." Families that resist were harassed and threatened. Some families have been told by the LTTE that: "if you report to the internationals you will only see the body of your child."

Hence, many cases of child recruitment went unreported due to increased insecurity and additional pressures by LTTE not to report. According to Human Rights Watch, the recruited child soldiers were subjected to rigorous training. One child soldier recounted how they were physically abused when training was overly strenuous. Another noted that escapees were beaten and sometimes killed if they were caught.

=== 2007 ===
According to UNICEF, between 1 November 2006 and 31 August 2007, 262 children were recruited by the LTTE; this figure includes 32 children who were re-recruited after being released. This number shows a significant decrease in recruitment as compared to the previous 12-month period, which saw the LTTE recruit 756 children, of whom 97 were re-recruits. In Batticaloa, many cases of child recruitment went unreported due to threats from the LTTE. The LTTE promised that it would release all of the recruits under the age of 18 before the end of the year. On 18 June 2007, the LTTE released 135 children under the age of 18. On 22 October 2007, UNICEF claimed that at least 506 child recruits (under the age of 18) still remained under the LTTE. UNICEF further noted that there had been a significant drop in recruitment of children by the LTTE. Furthermore, a report released by the LTTE's Child Protection Authority (CPA) in 2008 reported that fewer than 40 child soldiers, under the age of 18, still remained in their forces. In January 2008, the LTTE claimed that they had stopped child recruitment. Despite the LTTE claims the LTTE began increasing forced recruitment of children as the war neared its end recruiting children as young as 11 and threatening to shoot children that retreated. However many managed to run away under fire from the LTTE and according to the UNICEF a total of 594 children aged between 12 and 18 years surrendered to armed forces during the end of the war.

==== Concerns about the accuracy of UNICEF’s database ====
N. Malathy, the former Secretary of NESoHR raised concerns about the accuracy of UNICEF’s database and criticized UNICEF’s documentation of alleged child recruitment by the LTTE during the Sri Lankan Civil War, arguing that children associated with the LTTE for non-military purposes were wrongly classified as child soldiers and citing multiple cases in her book: Fleeting Moment in My Country: The Last Years of the LTTE De-Facto State.

Malathy details cases where UNICEF miscategorized civilians as LTTE child soldiers: a 7-year-old tsunami orphan placed in protective care by the LTTE; a 9-year-old girl with intellectual disabilities sheltered from domestic abuse, which UNICEF later corrected its error for; and a 17-year-old truck driver killed by a mine, whose auxiliary membership was only a formality to secure financial support for his family.

In 2007, the Associated Press reported UNICEF claims that the LTTE recruited many child soldiers in Batticaloa in a month. However, Malathy, who at the time received and handled all UNICEF-related child recruitment reports, stated that she received almost none from Batticaloa. Malathy also criticized a late-2007 article published by UNICEF New Zealand in the New Zealand Herald, which she argued did not reflect actual developments that happened on the ground at the time. When she raised the issue with UNICEF, the organisation sought to distance itself from the piece, saying each national UNICEF office operates independently and focuses primarily on fundraising.

== TMVP paramilitary recruitment and state involvement ==
Since the defection of the LTTE Eastern Commander Karuna to the Government of Sri Lanka in 2004, his pro-government paramilitary group TMVP, known as the Karuna Group, was held responsible for the abduction of children according to UNICEF and Human Rights Watch. Allan Rock, who is a special advisor to the UN Special Rapporteur for Children and Armed Conflict Dr. Radhika Coomaraswamy, alleged that paramilitary forces had forcibly rounded up young Tamil children to fight with Col Karuna's group. Colonel Karuna, while categorically denying any involvement in abducting children, alleged that Rock was an LTTE sympathizer. Civilians have also complained that the TMVP is continuing to abduct children, including some in their early teens, for use as soldiers. Allan Rock vowed that he had "credible evidence" for the accusations. The government of Sri Lanka and the Government newspaper Daily News asked Rock to produce substantive proof that Sri Lankan soldiers collaborated in child soldier recruitment. A 2008 report by the United Nations stated that TMVP continued to recruit children. The UN further noted that children have been abducted in places like Internally Displaced Persons (IDP) camps in Sri Lanka.

== Government response ==
The Sri Lankan government has used the LTTE recruitment of child soldiers as a powerful propaganda tool against the rebels. The government has also used it as a justification for killing Tamil children. Following the Chencholai bombing of schoolgirls in 2006, government spokesman Keheliya Rambukwella cited UNICEF report on child recruitment and stated that "UNICEF can't tell us they [the victims] are children and not to attack them". In February 2009, the Sri Lankan government and UNICEF jointly launched the "Bring Back the Child" multimedia campaign against the recruitment of child soldiers during the last stages of the war, when its own army was accused of committing war crimes against Tamil children. Some of the surrendered child soldiers, including the forcibly conscripted, were tortured, raped and executed. The government has also used the "rehabilitation" of former child soldiers as propaganda campaign aimed at the international community, such as the UNICEF-supported Bindunuwewa detention centre where 27 Tamil youth were massacred by a Sinhalese mob and police in 2000, with the culprits later being acquitted, some after having been sentenced to death. In the post-war period, former child soldiers have been increasingly targeted for torture by the authorities.

== See also ==
- Military use of children
- Government of Sri Lanka
- LTTE
- Colonel Karuna
