= Chief minister (Sri Lanka) =

Provincial-level government official

Chief ministers in Sri Lanka are elected heads of the provincial boards of ministers, bodies which aid and advise the governors, the heads of the provincial government, in the exercise of their executive power. The governor appoints as chief minister a member of the provincial council who, in his opinion, commands the support of a majority of that council. There are nine chief ministerial positions in the country, all nine are currently vacant and under the governor's direct rule.

== Appointment ==
A governor may appoint a chief minister, who would be the leader of the political party that commands the majority of the provincial council.

== Duties ==
The duties of the chief minister includes;

- Advising the governor on the appointment of the boards of ministers.
- Informing the governor of the province of all decisions of the Board of Ministers relating to the administration of the affairs of the province and the proposals for legislation.
- Furnish information relating to the administration of the affairs and legislation of the province to the governor.

== Salary ==
As per the Provincial Councils (Payment of Salaries and Allowances) Act, No. 37 of 1988, the chief minister is entitled to monthly salary and allowances equal of the governor, less than fifty rupees. In addition, since all chief ministers are members of provincial council they are entitled to allowances and benefits of provincial councilor.

== Incumbent chief ministers ==
Independent

Province	Chief minister	Portrait	Party	Took office	References	Past
Central	Vacant (Note: Governed directly by the Central government)					List
Eastern	Vacant (Note: Governed directly by the Central government)					List
North Central	Vacant (Note: Governed directly by the Central government)					List
Northern	Vacant (Note: Governed directly by the Central government)					List
North Western	Vacant (Note: Governed directly by the Central government)					List
Sabaragamuwa	Vacant (Note: Governed directly by the Central government)					List
Southern	Vacant (Note: Governed directly by the Central government)					List
Uva	Vacant (Note: Governed directly by the Central government)					List
Western	Vacant (Note: Governed directly by the Central government)					List
