= Tamil Makkal Viduthalai Pulikal =

Former paramilitary group and a current political party in Sri Lanka

Tamil Peoples Liberation Tigers தமிழ் மக்கள் விடுதலைப்புலிகள்
- Abbreviation: TMVP
- Chairman: Sivanesathurai Chandrakanthan
- General Secretary: Poopalapillai Prasanthan
- Founder: Karuna Amman
- Founded: 2004; 22 years ago
- Split from: Liberation Tigers of Tamil Eelam
- Preceded by: Karuna Group
- Headquarters: No - 91, Vavikkarai Road-01 Batticaloa.
- National affiliation: New Democratic Front; Former: Sri Lanka People's Freedom Alliance; United People's Freedom Alliance
- Parliament of Sri Lanka: 0 / 225
- Sri Lankan Provincial Councils: 0 / 455
- Local Government: 37 / 8,327

Election symbol
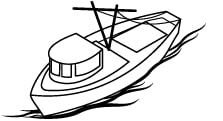
- Boat

Website
- tmvp.lk

Tamil Makkal Viduthalai Pulikal (TMVP; Tamil: தமிழ் மக்கள் விடுதலைப்புலிகள், English: Tamil Peoples Liberation Tigers), formerly known as the "Karuna Group", is a political party in Sri Lanka. It was formed by Karuna Amman (Vinayagamoorthy Muralitharan), a former leader of the Liberation Tigers of Tamil Eelam, after he defected from the organization in 2004. Initially a paramilitary group that supported the Sri Lankan government in its fight against the Tamil Tigers, the TMVP was registered as a political party in 2007.

Under deputy leader Pillayan (Sivanesathurai Chandrakanthan), they contested their first provincial elections in 2008, winning a majority in the Eastern Provincial Council. Members of the TMVP continued to carry arms until at least 2008 under the auspices of the Sri Lankan government, which they claimed to be for their own safety from the Tamil Tigers. The group was believed to be working with the Sri Lankan Army. They have been accused of human rights violation by local and international human rights organizations.

Following its entrance to democratic politics, the party aligned with the ruling United People's Freedom Alliance (UPFA). In 2020, it would align with the Sri Lanka Podujana Peramuna (SLPP) and manage to win a seat parliament for the first time, with Pillayan winning the most preferential votes in Batticaloa while the party would come in second place in the district. In the 2024 presidential elections, Pillayan pledged to support then-incumbent president Ranil Wickremesinghe in his bid for reelection. The TMVP failed to win any seats in the 2024 general election.

== History ==
The break-up between the LTTE and the Batticaloa-based Karuna group occurred in March 2004. Karuna and others felt that LTTE leader Vellupillai Prabhakaran had become a dictator of a state that used Northern Tamils to oppress the Eastern Tamils and that Eastern Tamils were not given due recognition for "laying down their lives in disproportionate numbers for the northern leadership". Together with Indian-based Eelam National Democratic Liberation Front, TVMP has formed Tamileela Iykkiya Viduthalai Munnani as a united front. The purported aim and the motive of the party are to safeguard the rights of Tamils within the Eastern Province.

The president of TMVP was Kumaraswamy Nandagopan until he was assassinated in November 2008 and the general secretary G.E. Gnanarajah. The third in command is Mangalan Master.

Since its formation, the group worked with the Sri Lankan Army to combat the Tamil Tigers. They have been accused of using children to combat the LTTE and have allegedly committed human rights violations in the East of the island. The TMVP, in conjunction with the Government of Sri Lanka on December 1, 2008 signed an action plan stating that they would cease the recruitment of child soldiers and that they would also release from combat all child soldiers.

== Internal affairs ==
=== Internal struggles ===
The TMVP has been affected by internal struggles between Colonel Karuna and Pillaiyan. Small skirmishes broke out between the Pillaiyan and Karuna factions with some fatalities in May 2007, October 2007, and in May 2008. However, Dheeban the Trincomalee district leader of the TMVP, denied a split claiming "the split between Karuna and Pillaiyan is a mere media fabrication".

In mid-October 2008, Karuna cadres ransacked the office of Pillaiyan, leading to government consternation and intervention. That same week, the Karuna faction took over the "Thamil Alai" newspaper, the organ of the TMVP, which had been run by Pillaiyan in Karuna's absence. However in late October, Karuna "made it a point to emphasise that there were no differences between them". Due to the internecine feuds between varying factions of the TMVP, the Government of Sri Lanka has decided it would begin the disarmament of the feuding groups in early 2009. As tensions flared up in late 2009, the government began putting restrictions on the placement of TMVP political signs in cities of the East of Sri Lanka.

=== Proposed name change ===
"Tamil Makkal Viduthalai Koddani" (Koodani meaning alliance) is a new Tamil political party in Sri Lanka that has been proposed by Colonel Karuna, as either a splinter group of, or a new name for the Tamil Makkal Viduthalai Pulikal. However, Sivanesathurai Chandrakanthan has denied that this has proposed, stating "When I met him (Karuna) and asked about this, he said that there was no such thing". The name change has been floated around because Karuna and related figures feel the word "Puligal" meaning Tiger, implies association with the Liberation Tigers of Tamil Eelam. The TMVP 11 member politburo is currently deliberating on the issue, with Karuna threatening to start the new party if it is not approved. However Karuna spokesman D. Kamalanathan denied both that a name change would take place and that there was a rift within the party, attributing the rumours to those against the TMVP.

== Human rights violations ==
=== General rights violations ===
The group has been accused by the Human rights organizations Human Rights Watch and Amnesty International of recruiting children, torture, assassinations and engaging in extortion in its war against the LTTE. Human Rights Watch claimed that from June 2006 to December 2006 they have forcefully recruited several hundred children. The TMVP has also been accused of being involved in kidnappings for ransom of wealthy, predominantly Tamil, businessmen to raise money in Colombo and other towns. Some businessmen were allegedly killed because their family could not pay the ransom. Media has reported that these abductions were linked to the Security forces in these abductions, either directly facilitating them or providing a cover and not taking any action against them. One such abducted man alleged that while he was being transported, from his workplace in Colombo, his abduction vehicle came across Army checkpoints but was not rescued.

In 2006, the Tamil Human Rights group UTHR also accused the TMVP of taking part in death squad activity against civilians.

=== Connection with the Sri Lankan State ===
The group is also believed to be actively working with the Sri Lankan Army. According to Human Rights Watch in one incident, the children who were abducted by the TMVP cadres were being held in a store across a Sri Lankan military camp. The parents of the abducted children pleaded with the military but no actions were taken. It was reported that two army men talked to the TMVP cadres and then walked away . Brad Adams, Asia director at Human Rights Watch said, “The government is fully aware of the abductions but allows them to happen because it’s eager for an ally against the Tamil Tigers”. The Human Rights Watch further added that it would be impossible to transport abducted children without the complicity of the Sri Lankan Army. In addition, civilians claimed seeing many TMVP cadres at Army checkpoints and claimed that they checked ID's of the people. The Human Rights Watch further claimed that they saw a top Karuna Eastern commander riding atop an army personnel carrier. They also claimed that Armed Karuna cadre openly roamed the streets in Batticaloa district in sight of security forces, and in some cases they jointly patrolled with the police. According to UTHR, a local Human rights organization, two children who escaped from the TMVP later surrendered to the Sri Lankan Army. The children were taken back to the TMVP camp allegedly by the Sri Lankan Army and was later beaten to death. Another such incident happened in Trincomalee where the abducted children by the TMVP were taken to a Sri Lankan Navy check point. Soon the Sri Lankan Navy personnel came on motorcycles and escorted the Karuna men and their abducted children to the TMVP office. TMVP has also been alleged to have killed INGO workers. Ragunathan Ramalingam, a worker for the International INGO (World Concern), was asked to come to a Navy checkpoint. He was allegedly shot dead when he reached the check point. Sri Lanka Monitoring Mission claimed that they saw TMVP pass through a checkpoint unchecked. It claimed that a white van, belonging to TMVP cadres, was transporting two 15-year-old boys and four armed civilians passed through an Army check point unchecked. However, the police maintained that they were instructed to check all vehicles and arrest any armed civilians.

== Political ==
=== Batticaloa local council elections, March 2008 ===
The local council elections of the Batticaloa district was held on March 10, 2008 after 10 years. The Tamil Makkal Viduthalai Pulikal (TMVP) party won all the 9 councils with 70% of high majority of votes also the polling reported as peaceful. The Batticaloa town was the only local council that TMVP contested under the banner of ruling United People's Freedom Alliance.

The largest Tamil party Tamil National Alliance totally boycotting these polls. United National party (UNP) also boycotted the polls by telling candidates not to run but some UNP candidates names' showed up on the voting list. Both groups claim unfair elections took place. TNA claimed it wasn't safe for them to operate in the east because the TMVP group was armed. TMVP threatened TNA MP's and also captured alive family members of TNA MP prior to the elections. The BBC News reported that unnamed human rights groups claimed TMVP used violence before the election and therefore the elections were "tainted". Independent candidate Rasiah Thurairatnam claimed that people voted out of fear for the TMVP.

=== Eastern Provincial Council elections, May 2008 ===
The Eastern Provincial Council elections was held on May 10, 2008. The 37 member provincial council election won by the ruling UPFA with the highest number of 20 seats, UNP 15 seats, JVP and other Tamil party 1 each. The TMVP members were contested under the UPFA banner and the Sri Lanka Muslim Congress (SLMC) members contested under the UNP banner. The present TMVP leader Sivanesathurai Chandrakanthan alias Pillayan has gained the highest number of 41,936 preferential votes from Batticaloa district.

== Electoral history ==
=== Parliamentary ===
Election year	Party leader	Votes	Vote %	Seats won	+/–	Government
2010	Sivanesathurai; Chandrakanthan	20,284	0.25%	0 / 225	Steady	Extra-parliamentary
2015	Sivanesathurai; Chandrakanthan	As a part of UPFA		0 / 225	Steady	Extra-parliamentary
2020	Sivanesathurai; Chandrakanthan	67,692	0.58%	1 / 225	▲1	Government
2024	Sivanesathurai; Chandrakanthan	34,440	0.31%	0 / 225	▼1	Extra-parliamentary

=== Provincial Council ===
Eastern Provincial Council
Election year	Party leader	Votes	Vote %	Seats won	+/–	Government
2008	Sivanesathurai; Chandrakanthan	As a part of UPFA		6 / 37	▲6	Government
2012	Sivanesathurai; Chandrakanthan	As a part of UPFA		1 / 37	▼5	Government

=== Local ===
Election year	Votes	Vote %	Councillors	+/–	Local Authorities	+/–
2011	4,622	0.05%	3 / 4,327	New	0 / 322	New
2018	44,062	0.36%	36 / 8,327	▲33	2 / 341	▲2
2025	39,791	0.38%	37 / 8,793	▲1	1 / 341	▼1

==== Results by council (2025) ====
Council	Votes	%	Pos.	Seats
Batticaloa MC	4,303	10.09	▼4th	3 / 34
Eravur UC	642	4.32	▲5th	2 / 17
Eravur Pattu PS	5,393	13.39	▼3rd	4 / 32
Koralaipattu PS	5,407	15.65	▼3rd	4 / 26
Koralaipattu North PS	5,157	37.87	1st	7 / 19
Manmunal South and Eruvil Pattu PS	3,894	12.55	▲3rd	2 / 20
Manmunal Pattu PS	948	5.11	▼7th	1 / 17
Manmunai West PS	2,630	16.55	2nd	3 / 19
Manmunal South West PS	5,135	33.65	▲2nd	6 / 16
Porthivu Pattu PS	6,009	29.75	▲2nd	5 / 16

== See also ==
- Military use of children in Sri Lanka
- 2006 murder of TRO workers in Sri Lanka
