= Sri Lanka Muslim Congress =

Sri Lanka Muslim Congress சிறீலங்கா முஸ்லீம் காங்கிரஸ் ශ්‍රී ලංකා මුස්ලිම් කොංග්‍රසය
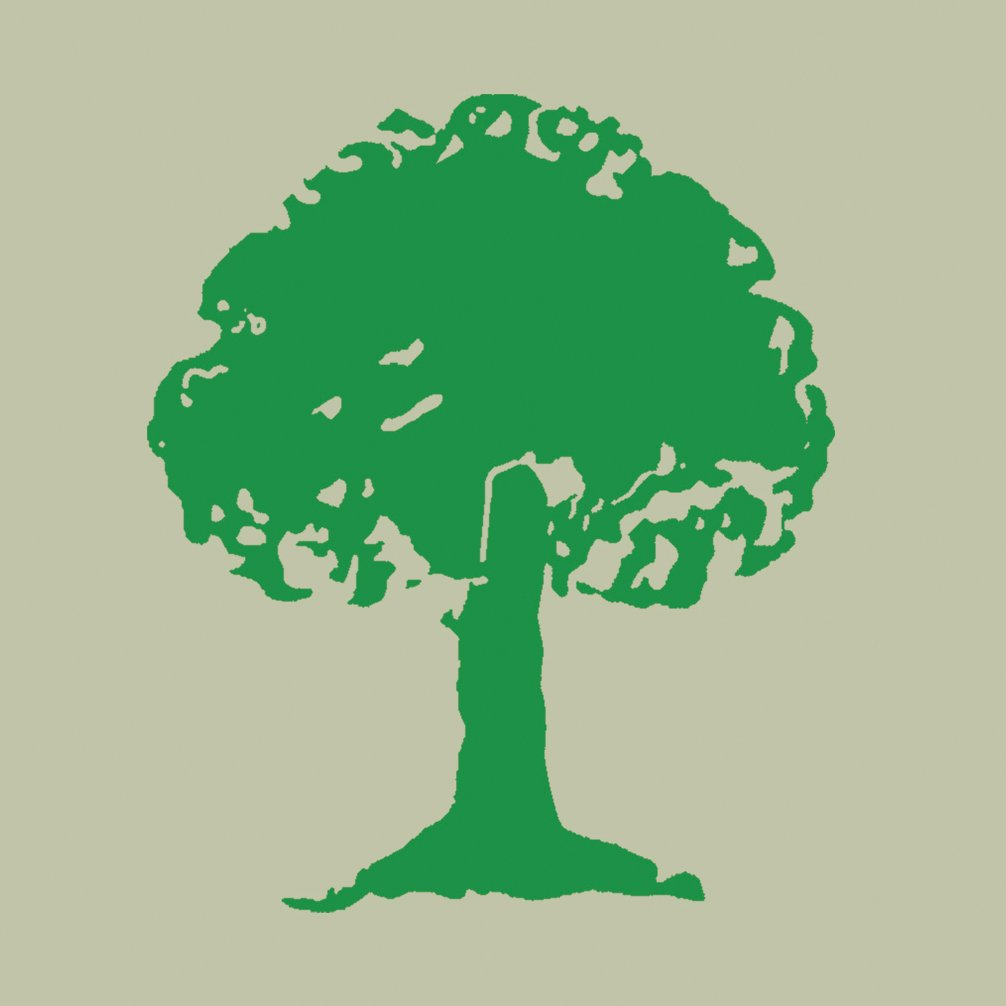
- Leader: Rauff Hakeem
- Chairman: M. L. A. M. Hizbullah
- Founder: M. H. M. Ashraff
- Founded: 1981; 45 years ago
- Headquarters: Dharussalam, 53, Vauxhall Lane, Colombo 02, Sri Lanka
- Ideology: Muslim minority politics
- Religion: Islam
- National affiliation: Samagi Jana Balawegaya
- Colors: Yellow; Green
- Parliament of Sri Lanka: 5 / 225
- Local Government: 116 / 7,842

Election symbol
- Tree

Party flag
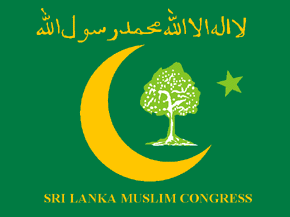

Website
- www.slmc.lk

The Sri Lanka Muslim Congress (Tamil: சிறீலங்கா முஸ்லீம் காங்கிரஸ், romanized: Śrīlaṅkā Muslim Kāṅkiras; Sinhala: ශ්‍රී ලංකා මුස්ලිම් කොංග්‍රසය, romanized: Śrī Lankā Muslim Kongrasaya) is a political party in Sri Lanka. Presently led by Rauff Hakeem, it is currently the largest party representing the Muslim community of Sri Lanka.

== History ==
The party was formed at a meeting held at Kattankudy in 1981 by a small study group of local Eastern Province political leaders. The group was pioneered by Congress Leader, M. H. M. Ashraff. According to M. M. Zuhair, the SLMC was later formed as a political party in order to prevent Muslim youth of the Eastern Province from joining the LTTE, which was then engaged in a civil war against the government:

"I had retainers from the Eastern Courts and the late M. H. M. Ashraff at that time had a wide practice in the courts of law in the East. Hashim, a former teacher and Advocate from Akkaraipathu who first alerted me to the coming events. His own son had become the Area Leader of the LTTE for Akkaraipathu. He was angry he could not stop his own son from joining the armed group. There were several other young Muslims who were joining the LTTE in numbers. They had lost confidence in both the UNP and the SLFP, and that was why they were joining the Tamils fighting for autonomy, he told me, and if this is not stopped, this would spell great danger, more for the Muslims outside the North-East. I spoke to Ashraff, I told him, the time has come for us to address this growing danger of Muslim boys joining the LTTE. He understood the repercussions and the likely fall-out. He was ready to give up his lucrative practice and form a Muslim Party, as the only way to arrest all possible damages. Ashraff said a Muslim party was the only answer to prevent Muslims joining the LTTE."

== Ideology ==
According to their official website, the SLMC is a political party that is totally focused on giving voice to the Muslim minority of Sri Lanka, which makes up 8% of the island's population. The party is centered around Muslim community interests, but is committed to foster multiracial amity and collective prosperity for all Sri Lankan citizens. It firmly believes that Sri Lankan Muslims can be equal partners in Sri Lanka's path to economic development and improvement in the general quality of life in Sri Lanka in the 21st century.

== See also ==
- Islamic political parties in Sri Lanka
- List of Sri Lanka Muslim Congress politicians
- List of Islamic political parties
