= List of United National Party MPs =

This is a list of United National Party MPs. It includes all parliamentarians that were elected to the Parliament of Sri Lanka representing the United National Party from 1946 to present day. The names in bold are the members of the party that became the President/Prime Minister of Sri Lanka.

== List of Parliamentarians ==
=== A ===
- Ossie Abeygunasekera
- Ashoka Abeysinghe
- Vajira Abeywardena
- Keerthilatha Abeywickrama
- Keerthi Abeywickrama
- Sumanadasa Abeywickrama
- A. R. A. M. Abubucker
- M. L. Ahamed Fareeth
- Lakshman Algama
- Ranjith Aluwihare
- Alick Aluwihare
- Bernard Aluwihare
- Wasantha Aluwihare
- John Amaratunga
- Sarath Amunugama (politician)
- D. P. Atapattu
- Lalith Athulathmudali
- Tissa Attanayake
- Gamini Atukorale
- Thalatha Atukorale

=== B ===
- Bakeer Markar
- M. D. Banda
- R. M. Dharmadasa Banda
- Nalin Bandara
- Palitha Range Bandara
- Ranjith Madduma Bandara
- Indika Bandaranayake
- Bandula Lal Bandarigoda
- Harold Herath
- Rohitha Bogollagama

=== C ===
- A. R. M. Abdul Cader
- M. Canagaratnam
- K. N. Choksy

=== D ===
- P. Dayaratna
- Anandatissa de Alwis
- Padmalal de Alwis
- Ronnie de Mel
- Fredrick de Silva
- George E. de Silva
- K. W. Devanayagam
- Donald Dissanayake
- Gamini Dissanayake
- Jayasena Dissanayake
- Mayantha Dissanayake
- W. M. P. B. Dissanayake
- Harindra Dunuwille

=== E ===
- Nandimithra Ekanayake
- W. B. Ekanayake
- S. U. Ethirmanasingham

=== F ===
- Harin Fernando
- Johnston Fernando
- Tyronne Fernando

=== G ===
- Anoma Gamage
- Daya Gamage
- K. Ganeshalingam
- Dunesh Gankanda
- Mohan Lal Grero
- Earl Gunasekara
- Edward Gunasekara
- Tudor Gunasekara
- Bandula Gunawardane

=== H ===
- M. H. A. Haleem
- Abdul Cader Shahul Hameed
- P. Harrison
- Kabir Hashim
- Renuka Herath
- Indradasa Hettiarachchi
- Wijepala Hettiarachchi
- E. L. B. Hurulle

=== I ===
- Mansoor Ibrahim
- P. C. Imbulana
- I. M. R. A. Iriyagolla

=== J ===
- Tuan Burhanudeen Jayah
- Chandrani Bandara Jayasinghe
- Ukwatte Jayasundera
- Karu Jayasuriya
- M. D. H. Jayawardena
- **Junius Richard Jayawardene**
- Jayalath Jayawardena
- **John Kotelawala**

=== K ===
- S. R. Kanaganayagam
- C. W. W. Kannangara
- M. S. Kariapper
- Akila Viraj Kariyawasam
- Ravi Karunanayake
- Gayantha Karunathilaka
- Rupa Karunathilake
- Sanjeewa Kavirathna
- Lakshman Kiriella
- Karunasena Kodituwakku
- Nalaka Kolonne
- Ananda Kumarasiri
- Buddhika Kurukularatne

=== L ===
- W. J. M. Lokubandara
- Gamini Lokuge

=== M ===
- Imran Maharoof
- M. A. M. Maharoof
- M. E. H. Maharoof
- T. Maheswaran
- Vijayakala Maheswaran
- G. D. Mahindasoma
- M. Mahroof
- M. A. Abdul Majeed
- Weerasinghe Mallimarachchi
- Tilak Marapana
- Saidulla Marikkar
- Imthiaz Bakeer Markar
- Cyril Mathew
- M. E. H. Mohamed Ali
- M. H. Mohamed
- Seyed Ali Zahir Moulana
- Sarath Munasinghe
- M. Mohamed Musthaffa
- A. J. M. Muzammil

=== N ===
- V. Nalliah
- Hemakumara Nanayakkara
- A. M. M. Naushad
- S. Natesan
- E. A. Nugawela

=== P ===
- Karu Paranawithana
- Ajith Perera
- Janaka Perera
- Joseph Michael Perera
- Larine Perera
- Neomal Perera
- Niroshan Perera
- G. M. Premachandra
- Champika Premadasa
- Sajith Premadasa
- **Ranasinghe Premadasa**
- Lionel Premasiri
- Rasamanohari Pulendran
- Susantha Punchinilame

=== R ===
- S. A. Raheem
- Mujibur Rahman (Sri Lankan politician)
- C. Rajadurai
- Perumal Rajadurai
- Harshana Rajakaruna
- Sarathchandra Rajakaruna
- Suranimala Rajapaksha
- Wijeyadasa Rajapakshe
- Ranjan Ramanayake
- Mahinda Ratnatilaka
- Abeyratne Ratnayaka
- Sagala Ratnayaka
- Amara Piyaseeli Ratnayake
- Anuruddha Ratwatte
- A. U. Romanis

=== S ===
- **D.S. Senanayake**
- **Dudley Senanayake**
- Percy Samaraweera
- Ravindra Samaraweera
- Malik Samarawickrama
- M. Satchithanandan
- E. L. Senanayake
- Rosy Senanayake
- Rukman Senanayake
- Sujeewa Senasinghe
- Lakshman Senewiratne
- Sidney Jayarathna
- Duminda Silva
- C. A. Suriyaarachchi
- D. M. Swaminathan

=== T ===
- Alfred Thambiayah
- S. Thambirajah
- Palitha Thewarapperuma
- A. Thiagarajah
- Hashan Tillakaratne

=== U ===
- Udara Rathnayake

=== V ===
- K. Velayudam

=== W ===
- Dilip Wedaarachchi
- Samaraweera Weerawanni
- Jayampathy Wickramaratne
- **Ranil Wickremesinghe**
- A. F. Wijemanne
- Udena Wijerathna
- Ranjan Wijeratne
- Mahinda Wijesekara
- Nimal Wijesinghe
- A. A. Wijethunga
- **Dingiri Banda Wijetunga**
- Ruwan Wijewardene
- Anuradha Dullewe Wijeyeratne
- Edwin Wijeyeratne
- Neranjan Wijeyeratne
- Nissanka Wijeyeratne

=== Y ===
- Lakshman Yapa Abeywardena
- R. Yogarajan

== See also ==
- Leader of the United National Party
- History of United National Party
