= Keerthisena Abeywickrama =

Sri Lankan politician

Hon. Keerthisena Abeywickrama
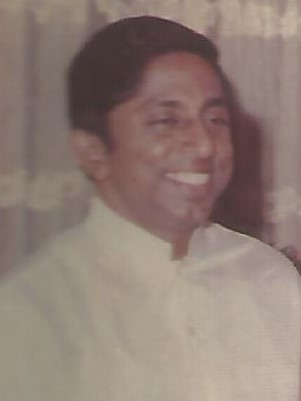

District Minister for Matara
- In office 1977–1987

Member of Parliament for Deniyaya
- In office 1977–1987
- Preceded by: Sumanapala Dahanayake
- Succeeded by: Keerthilatha Abeywickrama

Personal details
- Born: Keerthisena Chandradasa Abeywickrama; 20 December 1933
- Died: 18 August 1987 (aged 53) Colombo
- Party: United National Party
- Spouse: Dr. Maya Abeywickrama née Jayasinghe (m. 1982)
- Relations: Don Pedris Francis (father); Keerthilatha (sister); Sumanadasa Abeywickrama (cousin)
- Children: nil
- Education: Richmond College, Galle

Keerthisena Chandradasa Abeywickrama (20 December 1933 – 18 August 1987) was a Sri Lankan politician and a member of the parliament.

Abeywickrama was the son of Padikara Muhandiram Don Pedris Francis Abeywickrama and Catharina Abeywickrama née Liyanage from Morawaka, Sri Lanka. He received his education at Richmond College, Galle. He trained as a tea planter at the Madampe Group in Rakwana before managing the family estate in Morawaka.

Abeywickrama joined the United National Party and was elected as a Member of Parliament for the Deniyaya Electoral District at the 8th Sri Lankan Parliamentary Election in 1977. He served as the District Minister for Matara in the Jayewardene cabinet.

He was the cousin of Sumanadasa Abeywickrama, Deputy Minister of Agriculture Development & Research and Member of Parliament for Akmeemana. They both contested for the United National Party and won seats at the 8th Sri Lankan Parliamentary Election in 1977.

On 20 December 1982 he married Dr. Maya Abeywickrama née Jayasinghe, a music teacher, lawyer and author.

Abeywickrama was killed in the 1987 grenade attack in the Sri Lankan Parliament by members of the Janatha Vimukthi Peramuna (JVP) that was banned at the time. His sister Keerthilatha Abeywickrama was appointed Member of Parliament for the Deniyaya after his death.

The Keerthi Abeywickrama National School in Morawaka was named after him.

== See also ==
- List of political families in Sri Lanka
- Abeywickrama
- List of United National Party MPs
- List of Richmond College, Galle alumni
