= Keerthilatha Abeywickrama =

Sri Lankan politician

Keerthilatha Premawathie Abeywickrama was a Sri Lankan politician and a Member of the Parliament of Sri Lanka. Abeywickrama was the daughter of Padikara Muhandiram Don Pedris Francis Abeywickrama and Catharina Liyanage from Morawaka, Sri Lanka. She joined the United National Party and was appointed as a Member of Parliament for the Deniyaya Electoral District on 11 September 1987 after her brother Keerthisena was killed in the 1987 grenade attack in the Sri Lankan Parliament. She was the cousin of Sumanadasa Abeywickrama, a former Deputy Minister of Agriculture Development & Research and Member of Parliament for Akmeemana.

== See also ==
- List of political families in Sri Lanka
- Abeywickrama
- List of United National Party MPs
