= List of Richmond College, Galle alumni =

This is a list of notable Old Richmondites, the alumni of Richmond College, Galle, Sri Lanka.

== Heads of state and government ==
Name	Notability	Reference
Mahinda Rajapaksa	President (2005–2015), Prime Minister (2004–2005), member parliament - Kurunegala (2015–present), Hambantota (1989–2005), Beliatta (1970–1977)	
Wijeyananda Dahanayake	Prime Minister (1959–1960), member parliament - Galle (1947–1959, 1960–1977, 1979–1988)	

== Politics ==
Name	Notability	Reference
C. W. W. Kannangara	Father of Free Education in Sri Lanka, member Legislative Council - Galle (1923–1931), member State Council (1931–1947)	
Chamal Rajapaksa	member parliament - Hambantota (1989–present), Speaker of the Parliament of Sri Lanka (2010–2015)	
Simon Abeywickrema	Founding Vice President of United National Party, member Legislative Council - Udugama (1938)	
Charles Edirisuriya	Ceylonese politician	
R. A. de Mel	Mayor of Colombo (1944–1946), member parliament - Colombo South (1947–1952)	
Cyril de Zoysa	President of the Senate of Ceylon (1960–1965), industrialist, philanthropist	
W. A. de Silva	member State Council (1931–1942), Minister of Health (1936–1942)	
Montague Jayawickrama	Minister of Transport and Public Works (1952-1956), Minister of Public Administration and Home Affairs (1977-1987), Treasurer of the United National Party	
Keerthisena Abeywickrama	District Minister- Matara, member parliament - Deniyaya (1977-1987)	
William de Silva	member parliament - Ambalangoda-Balapitiya (1947–1953), Ambalangoda (1960), Devinuwara (1965)	
Amarasiri Dodangoda	member parliament - Galle (1989–1993, 1994–2009), Chief Minister of Southern Province (1993–1994)	
Robert Edward Jayatilaka	member parliament, Minister	
Hemakumara Nanayakkara	member parliament - Galle (1989–1994, 2000–2010), Governor of Southern Province (2015–present)	
Vasudeva Nanayakkara	member parliament - Kiriella (1970–1977), Ratnapura (1989–2001, 2010–present)	
Ramesh Pathirana	member parliament - Galle (2010–present)	
D. A. Rajapaksa	member parliament - Beliatta (1947–1965)	
D. M. Rajapaksa	member of State council	
George Rajapaksa	member of parliament	

== Judiciary ==
Name	Notability	Reference
G. P. S. de Silva	Chief Justice (1991–1999)	
M. W. H. de Silva	Supreme court judge	

== Education ==
Name	Notability	Reference
George Dissanaike	Senior Professor/Head of Physics Department University of Peradeniya, fellow of the National Academy of Sciences	
H. A. I. Goonetileke	bibliographer, librarian, University of Peradeniya, Darrell Medalist (1941)	
L. H. Mettananda	Sri Lankan educationist and activist	
Gamini Haththotuwegama	Professor, Universities of University of Peradeniya and University of Kelaniya, writer, film critic	
P. de S. Kularatne	educationist, former Principal Ananda College, Colombo, founder Nalanda College, Colombo	
M. M. M. Najim	Vice Chancellor South Eastern University of Sri Lanka (2015–present)	

== Civil and defense services ==
Name	Notability	Reference
Prasad Kariyawasam	Ambassador to United States (2014–present), High Commissioner to India (2009–2014)	
Austin Fernando	Governor of Eastern Province (2015–present), Secretary to the President of Sri Lanka (2017–2018), Defence Secretary	
Nandasiri Jasentuliyana	Director United Nations Office for Outer Space Affairs, Deputy Director-General United Nations Office at Vienna	
Lalith Jayaweera	Air Vice Marshal, Director General Health Services of Sri Lanka Air Force	
Ravi Arunthavanathan	Air Vice Marshall of Sri Lanka Air Force, Deputy Chief of Defence Staff	
B. M. U. D. Basnayake	Defence Secretary and Permanent Secretary to the Ministry of Environment and Renewable Energy.	

== Medicine ==
Name	Notability	Reference
C. G. Uragoda	physician, author, folklorist, historian, conservationist, president Royal Asiatic Society (Sri Lanka)	
U. S. Jayawickrama	Chairman of the Board of Study for Medicine Postgraduate Institute of Medicine (Sri Lanka)	
Tilak Weerasooriya	Dean - University of Ruhuna, deputy vice chancellor Kotelawala Defence University	

== Arts and media ==
Name	Notability	Reference
E. F. C. Ludowyk	author, playwright, critic	
Ediriweera Sarachchandra	playwright, novelist, poet, literary critic, essayist and social commentator, Chancellor - University of Peradeniya (1993–1996), Ambassador to France (1974–1977)	
Lionel Edirisinghe	musicologist and the inaugural principal at the University of the Visual & Performing Arts.	
Bandula Padmakumara	Sri Lankan journalist and television presenter	
Yasapalitha Nanayakkara	Sri Lankan director in cinema and stage drama	
Udayakantha Warnasuriya	Sri Lankan film director, producer, screenwriter and author	
Pubudu Chathuranga	Sri Lankan actor, model and screenplay writer	

== Sports ==
Name	Notability	Reference
Martin de Silva	All Ceylon cricket player	
Dhananjaya de Silva	International cricket player (2016–present), Sri Lanka test captain	
Wanindu Hasaranga	International cricket player (2017–present), Former Sri Lanka ODI Captain	
Kamindu Mendis	International cricket player (2018–present), Sri Lanka Under-19s Captain	
Charith Asalanka	International cricket player (2021–present), Sri Lanka ODI & T20I Captain	
Chamila Gamage	International cricket player (2002)	
Suranga Lakmal	International cricket player (2010–2022), Former Sri Lanka test captain	
Champaka Ramanayake	International cricket player (1986–1995)	
Dhananjaya Lakshan	One Day International cricket player (2021-22)	
Dhammika Sudarshana	First class cricket player & cricket coach	
Anil Rideegammanagedera	First class cricket player	
Percy Abeysekera	Sri Lankan cricket superfan	
