= Jinadasa =

Jinadasa may refer to:

== Given name ==
- Jinadasa Kitulagoda, Sri Lankan politician
- Jinadasa Niyathapala (1929–2018), Sri Lankan Politician
- Jinadasa Weerasinghe (1926–1987), Sri Lankan politician

== Surname ==
- Kalana Jinadasa, Sri Lankan naval officer
- P. L. Jinadasa, Sri Lankan planter and politician
- S. Jinadasa, Ceylonese politician
- Tilaka Jinadasa (born 1963), Sri Lankan former track and field athlete and netballer
- U. P. Y. Jinadasa (born 1911), Ceylonese politician
