= Siridhamma College =

- සිරිධම්ම විද්‍යාලය

Location
- Siridhamma Mawatha, Labuduwa; Galle; Sri Lanka; 6°4′18.31″N 80°13′55.42″E

Information
- School type: Public/National school
- Motto: පඤ්ඤා නරානං රතනං (Paññā Narānan Rathanan)
- Established: February 6, 1995
- Founder: Richard Pathirana
- Principal: Chinthani Athukorala
- Grades: 1-13
- Gender: Mixed school
- Enrollment: 3500
- Colours: Blue and gold
- Website: www.siridhammacollege.lk

Siridhamma College is a school in Labuduwa, Sri Lanka.

== History ==
Ven. Dr. Labuduwe Siridhamma Thera

Siridhamma College was established to fill the educational needs with the seat of Akmeemana by the Minister of Education Richard Pathirana in 1995. On 6 February 1995 the Prime Minister Sirimavo Bandaranaike opened the school by registering first school child name. The school was named Siridhamma College, after the monk, Labuduwe Siridhamma Thero, who was the first monk to graduate from Oxford University.

The school commenced with 90 students and one building with three classes for grade 1. It was subsequently expanded and in 1996, students were enrolled for grade 6 from a Placement test. With those chosen students, three classes for grade 6 were started. The increasing number of students resulted in school expanding with new buildings. On 6 January 1996 a new two—storey building for primary section was opened and construction was started on an additional three story building with a laboratory. The school held its first sport meet in 1996. In 1999 the school established a hostel to accommodate students from outside the area.

The first principal of the school was P. S. K. Rajapaksha. The first sports meet was held in 1996.

Siridhamma College is the only national school which conducts English medium classes from grade 1.

== Principals ==
The following individuals have served as principal of Siridhamma College:

Ordinal	Principal	Start	End	Years in office
1	P. S. K. Rajapakse	1995	2004	8–9 years
2	Sumedha Wackwella	2004	2007	2–3 years
3	Munipala	2007	2008	0–1 years
4	Premasiri Epa	2008	2012	3–4 years
5	Nihal Gurusingha	2012	2014	1–2 years
6	S. P. Ariyarathne	2014	2015	1–2 years
7	W. T. Raweendra Pushpakumara	2015	2023	6–7 years
8	Nayanapriya Perera	2023	2024	0–1 years
8	Chinthani Athukorala	2024	present	1–2 years

== Houses ==
School Houses and their colors

- Sapphire
- Diamond
- Crystal
- Opal
