= Dahanayake =

Dahanayake දහනායක
- Pronunciation: Dahanāyaka
- Language: Sinhala

Origin
- Region of origin: Sri Lanka

Other names
- Variant forms: Dahanaike; Dahanayaka

Dahanayake or Dahanaike or Dahanayaka (Sinhala: දහනායක, romanized: Dahanāyaka) is a Sinhalese surname.

== Notable people ==
- Charles Dahanayake, Sri Lankan academic
- Demintha Dahanayake (born 1986), Sri Lankan cricketer
- Sumanapala Dahanayake (born 1929), Ceylonese politician
- Wijaya Dahanayake, Sri Lankan politician
- Wijeyananda Dahanayake (1901–1997), Ceylonese politician
