= S. W. D. Ratnayake =

Sri Lankan politician (1901–1986)

Hon. S. W. D. Rathnayake

Member of the Ceylon Parliament for Deniyaya District
- In office 19 April 1956 – 5 December 1959
- Preceded by: V. G. W. Ratnayake
- Succeeded by: P. L. Jinadasa

Personal details
- Born: 5 December 1901 Deniyaya, Sri Lanka
- Died: 26 January 1986 (aged 84) Deniyaya, Sri Lanka
- Party: Sri Lanka Freedom Party
- Spouse: A. S. Rathnayake
- Relations: Robert Reginald Sepala Rathnayake (father)
- Children: S. S. Rathnayake, I. S. Rathnayake
- Education: Bengamuwe Central College
- Occupation: Proprietary Planter
- Profession: teacher

Sepala William Daineris Rathnayke (5 December 1901 - 26 January 1986) was a Sri Lankan politician.

Ratnayke was elected to the Parliament of Ceylon at the 3rd parliamentary election in 1956, representing the Deniyaya electorate, defeating the sitting member, V. G. W. Ratnayake, by 5,460 votes.
