= Vidyaloka College =

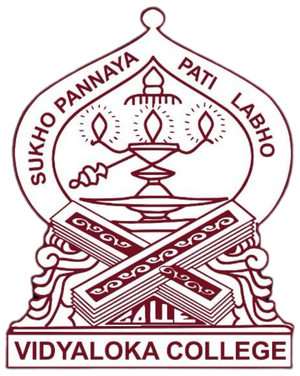
- Crest of Vidyaloka College

Location
- Galle; Sri Lanka; 6.0348°N 80.2167°E

Information
- Type: National school
- Motto: Pali: Sukhō Paññāya Paṭilābhō; Sinhala: සුඛෝ පඤ්ඤාය පටිලාභෝ (ප්‍රඥාව ලැබීම සැපයකි/Gaining wisdom is bliss)
- Religious affiliation: Buddhist
- Established: 14 January 1941; 85 years ago
- Founder: Weliwitiye Punyasara Thera; H. W. Amarasuriya
- Authority: Ministry of Education
- Grades: 1 to G.C.E. (A/L)
- Gender: Boys
- Age: 6 to 19
- Enrollment: 2100 +
- Houses: Ashoka; Gemunu; Prakrama; Sangabo
- Colors: Maroon and white
- Song: Desha subushitha da abhimane
- Website: vidyalokacollegegalle.sch.lk

Vidyaloka College is a boys' school in Galle, Sri Lanka. The school was established on 14 January 1941 by philanthropist Henry Woodward Amarasuriya under the patronage of Venerable Weliwitiye Punyasara Thera. It is a national school which accommodates over 2100+ students and provides primary and secondary education to them. The school was re-constructed after it was badly affected by the Indian Ocean tsunami in 2004. Students are divided into four houses according to their admission number. These houses are named after four ancient kings of Sri Lanka. The college provides education to about 2100+ students from grade 1 to grade 13 and it is regarded as one of the leading boys' schools in the Southern Province of Sri Lanka.

== School boundaries ==
The land named, Kekiri Obada Watta, where the school is located stretches up to the Wackwella road to the east, Vidyaloka Lane to the north, Sri Devamitta Mawatha to the West and Queens Cinema to the south. It is located on flat land of about of 0.81 ha (2 acres) situated in the middle of Galle.

== Past principals ==
- 1941 - 1944 : E. A. C. Munasinghe
- 1945 - 1964 : B. D. P. de Silva
- 1964 - 1965 : A. Hendravitharana
- 1965 - 1971 : B. K. de Silva
- 1971 - 1977 : Chandradasa de Silva
- 1977 - 1981 : Christy Nanayakkara
- 1981 - 1995 : D. H. Senevirathna
- 1996 - 2004 : M. B. L. de Silva
- 2004 - 2010 : N. G. Gunapala
- 2010 - 2013 : F. Welege
- 2013 – 2026 : Prasanna Senewiraththne

== Sports ==
Vidyaloka College is one of the best sports schools in the southern province. Sports at the college include Athletics, Kabaddi, Boxing, Chess, Cricket, Rugby, Soccer, Swimming, Volleyball, Table tennis, Badminton, Gymnastics, Carrom, Hokey and Karate.

=== Cricket ===
Battle of the Glory of Galle is an annual one day encounter cricket match played between the cricket teams of Vidyaloka College and St. Aloysius' College. The contest commenced in 2019.

By 2025, five annual competitions have been held with St. Aloysius' College having won three 3 times, while Vidyaloka College has yet to win. In 2024 and 2025, the match ended in a draw due to bad weather conditions. Along with this, a one-day competition for under 15 is also held annually. The matches are held at the Galle International Stadium.

The school previously played a two-day encounter, Friends Battle, against Meepawala Amarasuriya Vidyalaya on February every year at the Galle International Cricket Ground. The matches between these two colleges begun in 1998 and all the matches had been drawn. The competition finished in 2012.

== Notable alumni ==
=== Education and business ===
Name	Notability	Reference
Charles Dahanayake	founding professor of physics University of Kelaniya, founding president Institute of Physics, Sri Lanka	
W. D. Lakshman	Governor of the Central Bank, Vice Chancellor University of Colombo (1994–1999), Economist	
M. M. M. Najim	Vice Chancellor, South Eastern University of Sri Lanka	

=== Politics and government ===
Name	Notability	Reference
Nanda Gunasinghe	member parliament (Galle 1994–2001)	
Richard Pathirana	Minister for Education and higher education (1994-2000), minister for State Administration, Home Affairs and Administration Reforms (2000–01), member of Sri Lankan parliament (1983-2001)	

=== Military ===
Name	Notability	Reference
Renuka Rowel	Major General, Chief Signals Officer - Sri Lanka Signals Corps	

=== Sports ===
Name	Notability	Reference
Lasith Malinga	international cricket player (2004–present)	
Ashan Randika	Sri Lankan Cricketer	

=== Arts and media ===
Name	Notability	Reference
W. Jayasiri	actor, film director	
