= Samarasekera =

Samarasekera is a Sinhalese name and it may refer to

- Athula Samarasekera, Sri Lankan cricketer
- Indira Samarasekera, Vice-chancellor of the University of Alberta
- Johanne Samarasekera, Sri Lankan cricketer
- Justin Samarasekera, Sri Lankan architect
- Senapala Samarasekera, Sri Lankan politician
