= Bimputh Finance =

Sri Lankan finance company

- Company type: Public
- ISIN: LK0383N00006
- Industry: Finance
- Founded: July 27, 2007; 18 years ago
- Defunct: 2023
- Fate: Bankrupted
- Headquarters: Boralesgamuwa, Sri Lanka
- Number of locations: 47 (2021)
- Revenue: ▼LKR9.476 million (2023)
- Operating income: ▼LKR(375.335) million (2023)
- Net income: ▼LKR(375.335) million (2023)
- AUM: ▼LKR1,249.6 million (2020/21)
- Total assets: ▼LKR2.694 billion (2023)
- Total equity: ▼LKR(2.544) billion (2023)
- Owners: Daya Group (Pvt) Ltd (12.98%); A. Gamage (12.15%); D. K. Gamage (12.15%); Olympus Construction (Pvt) Ltd (12.00%); Daya Apparel Export (Pvt) Ltd (8.58%)
- Number of employees: 336 (2021)
- Rating: Fitch: CC(lka) withdrawn, October 2022

Bimputh Finance PLC was a Sri Lankan public limited company and functioned as a licensed finance company. It was a listed company in the Colombo Stock Exchange from 2012 to 2023. In September 2023, the Central Bank of Sri Lanka cancelled the operating license of the company due to the breach of regulatory requirements.

== Corporate history ==
The Bimputh Finance PLC was incorporated in 2007 and ventured into the provision of non banking services to customers. It was registered as a non banking financial institution by the Central Bank of Sri Lanka at the time of its incorporation. The company was predominantly under the control of the Gamage family. About 77% of the issued shares of Bimputh Finance were owned by the Gamage family.

The company initially commenced business operations as a microfinance lender. It later ventured into lending and investment solutions catering to the requirements of retail and small, medium enterprise sectors. Prior to the cancellation of the license, the finance company provided a wide array of services including corporate loans, personal loans, housing loans, gold, leasing facilities and foreign currency encashment services.

The company was listed in the Colombo Stock Exchange in 2012. In August 2015, politician Daya Gamage resigned from his position as the chairman of the company meanwhile his wife Anoma Gamage also resigned from her position as the non-executive director of the company. Daya Gamage resigned after being appointed as the Minister of Primary Industries during that time. Prior to the resignation of Daya Gamage and his wife, both held stakes accumulating to 24.3% of the company shares (12.15% apiece) as of June 20, 2015.

As of 2020, the company had branches operating in 22 districts and around 47 licensed locations had been established across Sri Lanka. As of 2020, it was one of 41 finance companies actively operating in Sri Lanka. In October 2020, the Central Bank of Sri Lanka issued a special notice to Bimputh Finance for non-compliance with the minimum capital adequacy requirement. In 2022, it was listed as one of the 12 Sri Lankan non-bank financial institutions on Rating Watch Negative by Fitch Ratings. Bimputh Finance PLC's credit profile was deemed negative coinciding with the Sri Lankan economic crisis.

The Central Bank of Sri Lanka officially terminated and cancelled the license of Bimputh Finance PLC with effect from 1 September 2023 as per the provisions of Section 37 of the Finance Business Act No. 42 of 2011. The Central Bank made a public announcement regarding the cancellation of license issued to Bimputh Finance and promised to pay compensation to the insured depositors of the company as per the provisions of the Sri Lanka Deposit Insurance and Liquidity Support Scheme Regulation No 02 of 2021. The Central Bank liquidated the company and cancelled the license as the company was deemed to have violated the provisions of Finance Business Act. The company was also making substantial losses due to deficient capital levels, liquidity issues and poor asset quality. It was also revealed that the Monetary Board of the Central Bank of Sri Lanka had granted several time extensions and reminders for Bimputh Finance to comply with the provisions of the Finance Business Act. However, according to the reports, Bimputh Finance had failed to make a robust progress despite the key recommendations provided by the Central Bank.
