= P. L. Jinadasa =

Sri Lankan politician

Hon. P. L. Jinadasa

Member of the Ceylon Parliament for Deniyaya District
- In office 1960–1960
- Preceded by: S. W. D. Ratnayake
- Succeeded by: Sumanapala Dahanayake

Personal details
- Born: Pilane Lokuge Jinadasa Deniyaya, Sri Lanka
- Died: 1960 Deniyaya, Sri Lanka
- Party: United National Party
- Occupation: Proprietary Planter

Pilane Lokuge Jinadasa was a Sri Lankan planter and politician. A planter from the Andaradeniya Estate in Deniyaya, he was elected to the Parliament of Ceylon representing the Deniyaya electorate. He was a member of the United National Party.

Jinadasa died before being sworn into office.
