= Shanakiya Rasamanickam =

Sri Lankan Tamil politician (born 1990)

Hon. Shanakiya Rasamanickam MP
- சாணக்கியன் இராசமாணிக்கம் ශානකියා රසමානික්කම්

Member of the Parliament of Sri Lanka
- Incumbent
- Assumed office 2020
- Constituency: Batticaloa District

Personal details
- Born: Shanakiyan Ragul Rajaputhiran Rasamanickam; 20 September 1990 (age 36)
- Party: Ilankai Tamil Arasu Kachchi
- Relations: S. M. Rasamanickam
- Education: University of Southern Queensland
- Profession: Accountant

Shanakiyan Ragul Rajaputhiran Rasamanickam (born 20 September 1990) is a Sri Lankan Tamil politician and Member of Parliament.

== Early life and education ==
Rasamanickam was born on 20 September 1990. He is the grandson of former MP S. M. Rasamanickam. Rasamanickam was educated at Trinity College, Kandy. He is fluent in Tamil, Sinhala and English. He studied commerce and accountancy in Australia. He has a Bachelor of Commerce from the University of Southern Queensland and a Bachelor of Laws degree from the IDM Campus and is a qualified Chartered Tax Adviser (CTA). He worked as an auditor in Australia for two years before returning to Sri Lanka in 2012.

== Political career ==
Rasamanickam was the Sri Lanka Freedom Party's organiser in Paddiruppu from 2013 to 2016. He was an associate of the Rajapaksa family and extremist Buddhist monk Sumanarathna, and a supporter of paramilitary leader Pillayan. He later joined the Ilankai Tamil Arasu Kachchi.

Rasamanickam contested the 2015 parliamentary election as one of the United People's Freedom Alliance's (UPFA) candidates in the Batticaloa District, but the alliance failed to win any seats in the district. He contested the 2020 parliamentary election as a Tamil National Alliance (TNA) electoral alliance candidate in Batticaloa District and was elected to the Parliament of Sri Lanka. He was the youngest opposition and TNA MP. He was re-elected in 2024. He became leader of the ITAK parliamentary group in February 2026. He is a member of the Committee on Public Enterprises (COPE), the Consultative Committee of the Foreign Affairs Ministry, Back-Benchers Committee and Speakers Panel.

=== Electoral history ===
Electoral history of Shanakiya Rasamanickam
Election	Constituency	Party	Alliance	Votes	Result
2015 parliamentary	Batticaloa District	Sri Lanka Freedom Party	United People's Freedom Alliance		Not elected
2020 parliamentary	Batticaloa District	Ilankai Tamil Arasu Kachchi	Tamil National Alliance	33,332	Elected
2024 parliamentary	Batticaloa District	Ilankai Tamil Arasu Kachchi		65,458	Elected
