= Chelvanayakam =

Chelvanayakam செல்வநாயகம்
- Pronunciation: Celvanāyakam
- Gender: Male
- Language: Tamil

Origin
- Region of origin: Southern India; North-eastern Sri Lanka

Other names
- Alternative spelling: Chelvanayagam; Selvanayagam; Selvanayakam

Chelvanayakam or Selvanayagam (Tamil: செல்வநாயகம்) is a Tamil male given name. Due to the Tamil tradition of using patronymic surnames it may also be a surname for males and females.

== Notable people ==
=== Given name ===
- P. R. Selvanayagam (born 1936), Sri Lankan politician
- S. Selvanayagam (1932–1979), Ceylonese geographer and academic
- S. J. V. Chelvanayakam (1898–1977), Ceylonese politician

=== Surname ===
- Antony Selvanayagam (born 1935), Malaysian priest
- Chelvanayakam Kanaganayakam (1952–2014), Canadian academic
