= Richard Pathirana =

Sri Lankan politician (1938–2008)

Hon. Richard Pathirana MP
- Richard Pathirana

Minister of education and higher education
- In office 1994–2000

Minister of state administration, home affairs and administration reforms
- In office 2000–2001

Member of Parliament for Galle District
- In office 1989–2001

Member of Parliament for Akmeemana
- In office 18 May 1983 – 15 February 1989

Personal details
- Born: 24 February 1938 Galle, Sri Lanka
- Died: 3 July 2008 (aged 70) Colombo, Sri Lanka
- Party: Sri Lanka Freedom Party
- Spouse: Vijitha Pathirage
- Children: Iromi, Dinusha, Ramesh Pathirana
- Education: University of Peradeniya; University of Sri Jayewardenepura; Vidyaloka College, Galle
- Occupation: Politician
- Profession: Teacher

Richard Pathirana (24 February 1938 - 3 July 2008) was a Sri Lankan politician and educationist. He was the minister for education and higher education from 1994 to 2000 and the minister for state administration, home affairs and administration reforms from 2000 to 2001 in the cabinets of Chandrika Kumaratunga.

== Life and career ==
Pathirana was born on 24 February 1938 at Labuduwa, Galle. Having obtained his primary education at Maitipe Vijayaraja College, he obtained his secondary education at Vidyaloka College, Galle. He graduated from the Peradeniya University and obtained his post graduate diploma from the University of Sri Jayewardenepura. He was married to Vijitha Pathirage and they had three children. He was a teacher by profession and his teaching career spanned over 22 years. He began his teaching career in 1958 and became a school principal in 1971. As an educationist, he did a great service for the development of Meepawala Amarasuriya Vidyalaya and Nagoda Royal College in Galle district.

In 1980, he entered politics and became the Akmeemana Sri Lanka Freedom Party organiser. He was first elected to the Parliament in 1983 in the Akmeemana by-election that year. He was the chief opposition whip from 1989 to 1994 in the Sri Lankan parliament and he was the Galle District leader for the Sri Lanka Freedom Party at many elections. He was re-elected to the parliament in 1994 and was appointed minister of education and higher education and chief government whip in the People's Alliance government of Chandrika Kumaratunga. He was the leader of the house i 2000 to 2001 and was the minister for state administration, home affairs and administration reforms. Later, due to ill health, he retired from politics.

Pathirana died on 3 July 2008, at the age of 70. His son, Ramesh, is a current member of parliament and minister of plantation industries and export agriculture.

== Service ==
Pathirana established the Rajarata, Sabaragamuwa and Wayamba Universities while higher education minister and increased the annual enrollments of students to local universities. He also took measures to double the allocation made for education and took the initiative to resolve the salary anomalies of Sri Lankan teachers as the education minister.

Pathirana founded Siridhamma College in Labuduwa, Galle.

== See also ==
- Politics of Sri Lanka
- Education in Sri Lanka
