= R. B. Kadramer =

Ceylonese politician (died 1963)

Hon. R. B. Kadramer

Member of the Ceylonese Parliament for Batticaloa
- In office 1952–1956
- Preceded by: Ahamed Lebbe Sinne Lebbe
- Succeeded by: C. Rajadurai

Personal details
- Died: 1963
- Party: Independent politician
- Profession: Lawyer
- Ethnicity: Sri Lankan Tamil

Robert Bruce Kadramer (? - 1963) was a Ceylonese politician.

At the 1st parliamentary election, held between 23 August 1947 and 20 September 1947, Kadramer contested the Batticaloa electorate as an Independent. He received 2,313 votes (17% of the total votes) but lost to the United National Party candidate, Ahamed Lebbe Sinne Lebbe who polled 4,740 votes (35% of the total vote).

In September 1950 the Illankai Tamil Arasu Kachchi (Federal Party) established a branch in Batticaloa, with Kadramer elected as the branch president.

He ran again at the 2nd parliamentary election, held between 24 May 1952 and 30 May 1952, again as an independent and this time was successful, obtaining 11,420 votes (59% of the total vote) defeating the sitting member, Lebbe, by 3,460 votes. Kadramer, although a Tamil, publicly questioned the creation of a separate Tamil state arguing that there was no geographic contiguity between the Tamil areas of the east and north.

In 1956, when the Federal Party competed for the first time in the electorate, Kadramer adopted the party label of the Batticaloa Tamil Speakers Front (BTSF). He was unable to retain his seat at the subsequent 3rd parliamentary election, losing to the Illanki Tamil Arasu Kachi (Federal Party) candidate, C. Rajadurai, by 8,004 votes.

Kadramer died in 1963.
