= Wijepala Hettiarachchi =

Sri Lankan politician

Honourable Wijepala Hettiarachchi MP

Member of Parliament for Galle District
- Incumbent
- Assumed office 2015

Personal details
- Born: Wijepala Hettiarachchi
- Party: United National Party
- Spouse: Geethani Weerasinghe
- Children: Two
- Education: Richmond College, Galle
- Alma mater: Nagoda Royal College; Richmond College, Galle

Wijepala Hettiarachchi is a Sri Lankan politician. He is a current member of the parliament of Sri Lanka for Galle District. Hettiarachchi is member of the United National Party and he previously served as a member of the Southern Provincial Council, before electing to the parliament. Born in Nagoda, he had his education at Nagoda Royal National College and at Richmond College, Galle.
