= V. G. W. Ratnayake =

Sri Lankan politician (1908–1994)

Victor Garvin Weerawardana Ratnayake MBE (10 August 1908 – 10 April 1994) was a Sri Lankan tea planter and politician.

Victor Garvin Weerawardana Ratnayake was born on 10 August 1908, at Pallegama Deniyaya, the eldest son of a tea plantation owner and popular philanthropist, Muhandiram A. A. W. Ratnayake. He educated at Mahinda and Ananda Colleges before attending the Peradeniya Farm School, where he obtained first class honours certificate.

On 28 October 1938, he married Olivia Beatrice née Werasekera, with whom they had four children, three daughters and one son: Githangeli, Subadra Lakshirni, Suwenethi Priyadharshini and Senaka Kumar Upatissa.

Ratnayake was elected to parliament at the 1st parliamentary election in 1947, representing the seat of Deniyaya. He received 4,510 votes (31%) beating his nearest rival by only 717 votes. In 1951 he was awarded a Member of the Order of the British Empire (Civil Division) in the 1951 New Year Honours.

He retained the seat at the 1952 parliamentary elections, with an increased majority, receiving 59.5% of the vote, 4,634 votes more than his closest rival. He served in the First Dudley Senanayake cabinet as the Parliamentary Secretary to the Minister of Lands and Land Development between 1952 and 1956. He was unsuccessful at the 3rd parliamentary election in 1956 losing to S. W. D. Ratnayake by 5,460 votes.

Ratnayake also served as the Chairman of the Morawaka Korale Planters Association and was an active member on the Board of Management of the Tea Research Institute Talawakelle. In 1961 he was elected as the chairman of the Planters Association and remained as the chairman until 1993.
