= W. D. Lakshman =

Sri Lankan economist

Deshamanya W. D. Lakshman

Governor of the Central Bank of Sri Lanka
- In office 24 December 2019 – 14 September 2021
- Preceded by: Indrajit Coomaraswamy
- Succeeded by: Ajith Nivard Cabraal

Personal details
- Born: 1941 (age 84–85) Mihiripanne, Galle
- Education: Vidyaloka College; University of Ceylon; University of Oxford

Deshamanya Weligamage Don Lakshman (commonly known as W. D. Lakshman) popularly known as Professor W. D. Lakshman is a Sri Lankan economist, professor, lecturer, academic and author who also served as the 15th Governor of the Central Bank of Sri Lanka and current chairman of the Monetary Board of the CBSL. He is regarded as one of the prominent economists of the country mainly well known for his immense contributions to policy related activities and for being specialised in the field of Economics.

== Early life ==
Lakshman was born in 1941 as the third of four children of the business family of Mr. and Mrs. Porolis de Silva in a small village in Mihiripanne, Galle District and hails from a humble family background. His father was a small scale businessman. He pursued his primary and secondary education at Vidyaloka College, Galle, and was the Head Prefect at school.

== Career ==
After completing his secondary education, he joined the University of Ceylon in 1960 based on his performance at the University Preliminary Examination. He completed his Bachelor's Degree in Economics from the University of Ceylon, where he was an undergraduate from 1960 to 1964. He pursued his career as an assistant lecturer in 1964 with the University of Ceylon and served until 1968. He also started writing books in Sinhala language while serving as assistant lecturer in 1965 in order to solve difficulties faced by students studying in Sinhala medium due to the lack of proper academic reading material. This include the economics textbook Aarthika Vishleshana, coauthored with H.M. Gunasekera (economist). He also served as an assistant lecturer at the Vidyodaya University in 1972.

He also completed his doctorate at the University of Oxford on a university scholarship in 1968 and obtained Doctor of Philosophy in 1973. While serving as a senior lecturer in Economics at the University of Peradeniya, he was appointed as the Professor of Economics at the University of Colombo in 1982 and was also subsequently appointed as the Head of the Department in University of Colombo. He was also subsequently promoted as a senior professor in 1992.

He was the Vice Chancellor of University of Colombo from 1994 to 1999 and he resigned from the position in 1999 in order to take up a visiting professor assignment at a Japanese university. In recognition of his contribution to the field of education, the Sri Lankan government honoured him with Deshamanya title in 2005. Having rendered a yeoman service to the university system in Sri Lanka over a period of 43 years, he retired on 27 October 2007. The University of Colombo, in recognition of his services to higher education honoured him with the degree in Doctor of Letters in 2008 during an annual convocation. He was also granted the honorary title of Professor Emeritus in 2007 from the University of Colombo.

After his retirement, Lakshman was appointed as an advisor to the Ministry of Finance in 2008 and as the chairman of the Institute of Policy Studies (IPS) in 2010. In 2009, he was appointed the chairman of the Presidential Commission on Taxation in Sri Lanka. In 2018, he was also appointed as the chairman of the Presidential committee by the then president Maithripala Sirisena to probe and report on the controversial Singapore-Sri Lanka Trade Agreement.

On 24 December 2019, President Gotabaya Rajapaksa appointed him as the 15th Governor of the Central Bank of Sri Lanka replacing Indrajit Coomaraswamy who resigned from the position for personal reasons. Lakshman was appointed as the CBSL governor at the age of 78 despite not having adequate experience with the Central Banking system and the age limit of 70. On September 10, 2021 he announced at a media conference that he would be stepping down with effect from September 14, six weeks before his intended retirement date. He stated that his ideology was shared by a minority. He also faced severe criticism during his tenure as CBSL governor, as the Central Bank of Sri Lanka had printed too much money, much more than required which eventually led to a soar in general price levels. He had also reportedly received an offer to join the International Monetary Fund but had turned down the offer.

== Conviction of economic mismanagement ==
Lakshman along with the Rajapakasha brothers and others were found guilty of economic mismanagement between 2019 and 2022 by the Supreme Court of Sri Lanka which stated on 14 November 2023 that the respondents have breached the fundamental rights to equal protection of the law in terms of Article 12(1) of the Constitution in a fundamental rights petition filed by filed by Transparency International Sri Lanka (TISL) and other four activists.
