= P. Ganeshalingam =

Sri Lankan politician

Hon. P. Ganeshalingam MP

Member of Parliament for Paddiruppu
- In office 1977–1983
- Preceded by: S. Thambirajah

Personal details
- Born: 6 July 1932 (age 94)
- Died: March 1986
- Party: Tamil United Liberation Front
- Ethnicity: Sri Lankan Tamil

Poopalapillai Ganeshalingam was a Sri Lankan Tamil politician and Member of Parliament.

Ganeshalingam was born on 6 July 1932.

Ganeshalingam stood as the Tamil United Liberation Front's candidate in Paddiruppu at the 1977 parliamentary election. He won and entered Parliament. Ganeshalingam and all other TULF MPs boycotted Parliament from the middle of 1983 for a number of reasons: they were under pressure from Sri Lankan Tamil militants not to stay in Parliament beyond their normal six-year term; the Sixth Amendment to the Constitution of Sri Lanka required them to swear an oath unconditionally renouncing support for a separate state; and the Black July riots in which up to 3,000 Tamils were murdered by Sinhalese mobs. After three months of absence, Ganeshalingam forfeited his seat in Parliament on 22 October 1983. Ganeshalingam died in March 1986.
