= Abeywickrama =

Abeywickrama අබේවික්‍රම
- Pronunciation: Abēvikrama
- Language: Sinhala

Origin
- Region of origin: Sri Lanka

Other names
- Alternative spelling: Abeywickrema

Abeywickrama or Abeywickrema (Sinhala: අබේවික්‍රම, romanized: Abēvikrama) is a Sinhalese surname.

== Notable people ==
- Don Pedris Francis Abeywickrama (1886–1966), Ceylonese writer and poet
- Harsha Abeywickrama (born 1960), Sri Lankan aviator
- Henry Abeywickrema (1905–1976), Ceylonese politician
- Joe Abeywickrama (1927–2011), Sri Lankan actor
- Keerthilatha Abeywickrama, Sri Lankan politician
- Keerthisena Abeywickrama (1933–1987), Sri Lankan politician
- Sanduni Abeywickrema (born 1982), Sri Lankan cricketer
- Simon Abeywickrema (1903–1948), Ceylonese politician
- Sumanadasa Abeywickrama (1928–2006), Sri Lankan politician
