= Batticaloa Municipal Council =

Local authority of Batticaloa, Sri Lanka

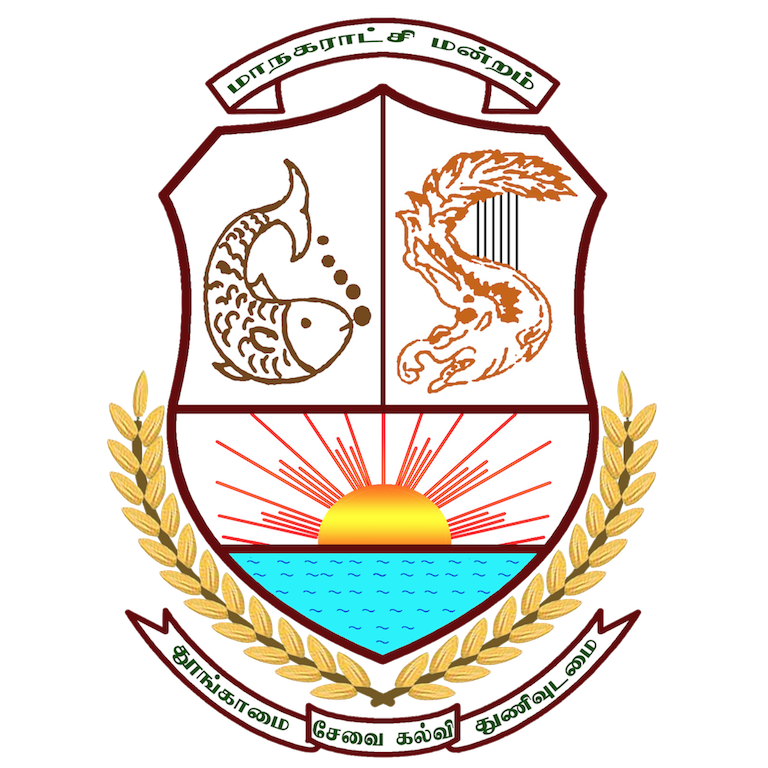

Type
- Type: Local authority

Leadership
- Mayor of Batticaloa: TBD
- Deputy Mayor of Batticaloa: TBD

Structure
- Seats: 34
- Political groups: ITAK (16); NPP (9); Independents (4); TMVP (3); SJB (2)

Elections
- Last election: 6 May 2025
- Next election: TBD

Website
- https://batticaloa.mc.gov.lk/

Batticaloa Municipal Council (BMC) is the local authority for the city of Batticaloa in eastern Sri Lanka. BMC is responsible for providing a variety of local public services including roads, sanitation, drains, housing, libraries, public parks and recreational facilities. It has 19 members elected using the open list proportional representation system. The territory of BMC is commensurate with that of Manmunai North Divisional Secretariat.

== History ==
Batticaloa was administered by a local board between 1884 and 1932. In 1933 the town was upgraded to an Urban Council with eight wards. The number of wards was increased to ten in 1944. In 1956 the territory administered by the council was expanded and the number of wards was increased to fourteen.

In 1967 the council was merged with the Manmunai North – East (Northern Portion) Village Council and elevated to the status of a Municipal Council. Following this change, the Batticaloa Municipal Council (BMC) consisted of 19 wards. The first mayor of the BMC was Chelliah Rajadurai, who also served as the Batticaloa Member of Parliament.

The council was dissolved in 1974 and the city was subsequently administered by special commissioners until local government elections were held in 1983. However, all members of the council resigned shortly after the election. Batticaloa was again placed under the administration of special commissioners until local elections were held in 1994.

In 1988 the BMC absorbed the Valaieravu Rural Council, increasing the administrative area under its jurisdiction. The council was dissolved again on 31 March 1999, after which the city continued to be administered by special commissioners until municipal elections were held in 2008.

== Mayors ==
The Mayor of Batticaloa is the head of Batticaloa Municipal Council.

== Commissioners, Deputy Commissioners and secretaries ==
The following were some of the city's commissioners and secretaries:

=== Secretaries ===
- 1937–63 K. Thirunavukarasu
- 1966–67 J. J. C. Tambinayagam

=== Commissioners ===
- 1967–1970 J. J. C. Tambinayagam
- 1983-1987 Mr. Benedict Tarsicius
- 1988–1989 M. Sinniah (Acting)
- 1989–1991 K. Karthigesu (Acting)
- 1992–1994 C. Punniyamoorthy
- 1994–1996 P. Kanapathipillai
- 1996–2006 S. Navaneethan
- 2006–2009 M. Uthayakumar
- 2009–2013 K. Sivanathan
- 2014–2016 M.Uthayakumar
- 2017–2017 V.Thavarajah
- 2017–2018 N.Manivannan
- 2018-2020 K.Sithiravel
- 2020-2022 M.Thayaparan
- 2022-2023 N.Mathivannan
- 2023- Eng.N.Sivalingam

=== Deputy Commissioners ===
- 2013 – N.Thananjayan
- 2019- U.Sivarajah

=== Municipal Secretaries ===
- 2017 – 2018 Rifka Shafeen
- 2018 – 2018 Siyahul hug

=== 1983 local government election ===
Results of the local government election held on 18 May 1983:

Alliances and parties	Votes	%	Seats
Tamil United Liberation Front	10,993	62.75%	13
United National Party	6,229	35.55%	6
Independent	298	1.70%	0
Valid Votes	17,520	100.00%	19
Rejected Votes	62		
Total Polled	17,582		
Registered Electors	22,894		
Turnout	76.80%		

All members of the council resigned one month after being sworn in. Batticaloa didn't have an elected local government for sporadic periods, this was due to various reasons. Aljazeera, the Asiafoundation and the Daily Mirror attribute this to civil war; Reuters and the US State Department attribute this to calls for election boycotts by the LTTE (enforced with brutal reprisals for non-compliance) and the Tamilnet attribute it to The Sri Lankan government's suspension of all local government in the north and east of the country in 1983 using Emergency Regulations. Batticaloa was administered by special commissioners until 1994 when local elections were held. The council was dissolved on 31 March 1999. Special commissioners administered the city until the 2008 elections.

=== 2008 local government election ===
Results of the local government election held on 10 March 2008:

Alliances and parties	Votes	%	Seats
United People's Freedom Alliance (TMVP et al.)	14,158	53.77%	11
Independent 1 (EPDP, EPRLF (P), PLOTE)	9,601	36.46%	6
Sri Lanka Muslim Congress	1,788	6.79%	1
Eelavar Democratic Front (EROS)	427	1.62%	1
National Development Front	291	1.11%	0
Independent 3	43	0.16%	0
Independent 2	23	0.09%	0
Valid Votes	26,331	100.00%	19
Rejected Votes	2,822		
Total Polled	29,153		
Registered Electors	54,948		
Turnout	53.06%		

The following candidates were elected: Sivageetha "Pathmini" Prabhakaran (UPFA-TMVP), 4,722 preference votes (pv); Sellappillai "Chelliah" Aseerwatham (Ind 1), 949 pv; Kandiah Arumailingam (Ind 1-EPDP); Edwin Silva Krishnanandaraja alias Piratheep Master (UPFA-TMVP), 3,805 pv; John Baptist Fernando (UPFA); Abiragam George Pillai (UPFA); Namasivayam Karunanantham (UPFA); Thambiaiah Kirubarajah (UPFA); Maylvakanam Niskanandararajah (Ind 1); Rajanathan Prabhakaran (EROS); Wellington Rajendra Prasad (UPFA); Kanagasabai Preman (UPFA); Nagoor Khan Ramlan (SLMC); Pragasam Sagayamany alias Killi Master (UPFA-TMVP); Devanayagam Weerasingam Sathyananthan (UPFA); Mahendiramoorthy Suthenthiran (Ind 1); Kandasamy Thavarasa (UPFA); Benadit Thanabalasingam (Ind 1); and R. Thurairatnam (Ind 1-EPRLF).

Sivageetha Prabhakaran (UPFA-TMVP) and Edwin Silva Krishnanandaraja (UPFA-TMVP) were appointed Mayor and Deputy Mayor respectively.

Edwin Silva Krishnanandaraja of UPFA-TMVP resigned as a member of BMC and was replaced by Selvarasa Sasikumar. He was replaced as Deputy Mayor by Abiragam George Pillai (UPFA).

R. Thurairatnam (Ind 1-EPRLF) resigned to contest the Eastern provincial council elections. He was replaced by Kandasamy Mahenthiraraja (Ind 1).
