= Nanda Gunasinghe =

Sri Lankan politician (1944–2006)

Hon. Nanda Gunasinghe MP

Member of Parliament for Galle District
- In office August 1994 – December 2001

Personal details
- Born: Kaluarachchige Nandadasa Gunasinghe; 15 March 1944 Galle
- Died: 2 March 2006 (aged 61)
- Party: Sri Lanka Freedom Party
- Children: Thisara gunasinghe and wathsala gunasinghe
- Education: Master of art
- Alma mater: Vidyaloka College; University of Colombo
- Profession: Teacher

Kaluarachchige Nandadasa Gunasinghe (15 March 1944 – 2 March 2006) was a Sri Lankan politician. A member of the Sri Lanka Freedom Party, Gunasinghe represented the Sri Lankan parliament for Galle district from 1994 to 2001. Gunasinghe later entered the Southern Provincial Council as a Provincial Councillor. He also served as the Chairman of the Dhakshina Sanwardena Adhikariya (Southern Development Authority) and as a Director of the Water Board.

Formerly a school teacher who joined the Sri Lanka Freedom Party in 1977, he subsequently became the chief organiser of the Habaraduwa electorate. Gunasinghe had his education at Vidyaloka College, Galle and Faculty of Arts, University of Colombo. He died on 2 March 2006 at the age of 62. His son Thisara is also involved in politics. He is currently working as a Habaraduwa chief organiser of the Sri Lanka Freedom Party.
