= Ahamed Lebbe Sinne Lebbe =

Sri Lankan politician (born 1902)

Hon. Mudaliar Ahamed Lebbe Sinne Lebbe

Member of the Ceylon Parliament for Batticaloa
- In office 1947–1952
- Preceded by: seat created
- Succeeded by: R. B. Kadramer

Personal details
- Born: 2 June 1902
- Party: United National Party
- Relations: Ahamed Rizvi Sinnalebbe (grandson)
- Children: Abdul Lathiff Sinnalebbe (son)

Mudaliar Ahamed Lebbe Sinne Lebbe, also known as Ahamedlebbe Sinnalebbe (born 2 June 1902), was a former Ceylonese headmen and Member of Parliament representing Batticaloa District.

== Government service ==
Ahamed Lebbe Sinne Lebbe joined the government service in 1929 as an Assistant Mudaliyar in Manmunai Pattu. In 1932, he was appointed Acting Vannia Mudaliyar. He was later confirmed as Vannia Mudaliyar and transferred to Panama Pattu, where he held the office of Inquirer and acted as Vannia Mudaliyar of Akkarai Pattu. Sinne Lebbe was member of the Excise Advisory Committee and Salt Storekeeper, Pottuvil. He was elected the chairman, Divisional Agricultural Association Village Committee and was an honorary member of the Game Protection Society.

In June 1946, he was appointed Justice of the Peace for the Batticaloa District by the Governor of Ceylon on the occasion of the King's birthday.

== Political career ==
Flag of the Dominion of Ceylon, 1948–1951.

Flag of the Dominion of Ceylon, 1951–1972.

At the 1st parliamentary election held in 1947 Sinne Lebbe ran, as the United National Party candidate, in the seat of Batticaloa. He received 4,740 votes (35.4% of the total vote) defeating four other Independents.

On 16 January 1948 Sinne Lebbe tabled before parliament the following motion;

"Subsequent to signing the Upcountry Agreement in 1815, I hereby propose to this honourable assembly that the royal flag of King Sri Wickrema Rajasinghe depicting on a yellow background a lion carrying a sword in its right paw, on a red background as the official flag of independent Ceylon."

The motion however was drafted by J. R. Jayewardene, the member for Kelaniya, who persuaded Sinne Lebbe to move the motion, as he was a Muslim thereby creating confusion amongst any likely opposition by the Tamil members of parliament. The motion was seconded by A. Ekanayake Gunasinha, the member for Colombo Central Electoral District. Sinne Lebbe did not participate in the ensuing debate.

As a result of the opposition to the motion, the Prime Minister D. S. Senanayake, on 27 January 1948, formed of a parliamentary committee, which resulted in the royal flag, with the addition of two strips of orange and green, being adopted as the national flag.

Sinne Lebbe unsuccessfully sought to be re-elected at the 2nd parliamentary election held in May 1952 from the United National Party, losing to R. B. Kadramer, an independent, by 3,460 votes (Sinne Lebbe only securing 41% of the total vote). Sinne Lebbe also lost the 1956 general election, to the Federal Party candidate Chelliah Rajadurai, receiving 7,124 votes, against Rajadurai's 9,300 votes.

== Family ==
Both Sinne Lebbe's son, Abdul Lathiff and his grandson, Ahamed Rizvi, served as members of parliament representing Batticaloa in 1965-1970 and 1985-1989 respectively.

== See also ==
- List of political families in Sri Lanka
