= Tamil Tigers' Debt to America =

Tamil Tigers' Debt to America: US Foreign Policy Adventurism & Sri Lanka's Dilemma
- Author: Daya Gamage
- Language: English
- Genre: Non-fiction
- Publisher: CreateSpace Independent Publishing Platform
- Publication date: November 9, 2016
- Publication place: United States
- Media type: Paperback
- Pages: 654
- ISBN: 978-1-5370-5348-6

Tamil Tigers' Debt to America: US Foreign Policy Adventurism & Sri Lanka's Dilemma is a book written by Daya Gamage, a retired public affairs assistant and political specialist of United States Department of State. The book provides an analysis and interpretation of Washington's covert and overt foreign policy adventurism on Sri Lanka and practices that revived the country's domestically annihilated military organisation Tamil Tigers (LTTE) in the global arena.

The author, Daya Gamage was a public affairs assistant and political specialist from 1970 to 1994 at the US diplomatic mission in Sri Lanka. He won a Meritorious Honor Award for his superior performance and professionalism in 1988 from the U.S. State Department.

== Synopsis ==
The book describes how Washington created a conducive ambience through its foreign policy to make a respectable global recognition to the Tamil Diaspora, to bring Sri Lanka to the UNHRC in Geneva and possibly for war crimes at ICC in The Hague, after its disappointment in failure to salvage the leadership of Tamil Tigers, the organization which was designated as a foreign terrorist organization (FTO) by America itself under US Federal laws, at the end of the Sri Lankan Civil War. Also it documents about how then US Secretary of State Hillary Clinton had used her authority to suspend IMF funding to Sri Lanka during the last months of the armed conflict as a way of put pressure on the Rajapaksa regime to halts its military offensive against Tamil Tigers to facilitate Prabhakaran to leave the battle ground.
