= Paddiruppu Electoral District =

Electoral district of Sri Lanka, 1947–1989

Coordinates: 7.5161°N 81.7856°E

Paddiruppu electoral district was an electoral district of Sri Lanka between August 1947 and February 1989. The district was named after the town of Paddiruppu in Batticaloa District, Eastern Province. The 1978 Constitution of Sri Lanka introduced the proportional representation electoral system for electing members of Parliament. The existing 160 mainly single-member electoral districts were replaced with 22 multi-member electoral districts. Paddiruppu electoral district was replaced by the Batticaloa multi-member electoral district at the 1989 general elections, the first under the PR system, though Paddiruppu continues to be a polling division of the multi-member electoral district.

== Members of Parliament ==
Key

Independent ITAK UNP

Election	Member	Party	Term
1947	S. U. Ethiramanasingham		1947–1952
1952	S. M. Rasamanickam	Independent	1952–1956
1956	S. U. Ethiramanasingham		1956–1960
1960 (March)	S. M. Rasamanickam	Illankai Tamil Arasu Kachchi	1960-1970
1960 (July)	S. M. Rasamanickam	Illankai Tamil Arasu Kachchi	1960-1970
1965	S. M. Rasamanickam	Illankai Tamil Arasu Kachchi	1960-1970
1970	S. Thambirajah	United National Party	1970–1977
1977	P. Ganeshalingam	Tamil United Liberation Front	1977–1989

== Elections ==
=== 1947 Parliamentary General Election ===
Results of the 1st parliamentary election held between 23 August 1947 and 20 September 1947 for the district:

Candidate	Party	Symbol	Votes	%
S. U. Ethiramanasingham		Bird	5,672	37.63%
S. M. Rasamanickam	Independent	Pair of Spectacles	4,784	31.74%
V.O. Gurugulasinghe		Hand	4,617	30.63%
Valid Votes			15,073	100.00%
Rejected Votes			274	
Total Polled			15,347	
Registered Electors			22,358	
Turnout			68.64%	

=== 1952 Parliamentary General Election ===
Results of the 2nd parliamentary election held between 24 May 1952 and 30 May 1952 for the district:

Candidate	Party	Symbol	Votes	%
S. M. Rasamanickam	Independent	Pair of Spectacles	7,672	39.92%
S. U. Ethiramanasingham		Bird	7,198	37.45%
K. Arulambalam		Star	4,350	22.63%
Valid Votes			19,220	100.00%
Rejected Votes			198	
Total Polled			19,418	
Registered Electors			23,440	
Turnout			82.84%	

=== 1956 Parliamentary General Election ===
Results of the 3rd parliamentary election held between 5 April 1956 and 10 April 1956 for the district:

Candidate	Party	Symbol	Votes	%
S. U. Ethiramanasingham		Lamp	9,528	50.28%
S. M. Rasamanickam	Federal Party	House	9,422	49.72%
Valid Votes			18,950	100.00%
Rejected Votes			222	
Total Polled			19,172	
Registered Electors			25,849	
Turnout			74.17%	

=== 1960 (March) Parliamentary General Election ===
Results of the 4th parliamentary election held on 19 March 1960 for the district:

Candidate	Party	Symbol	Votes	%
S. M. Rasamanickam	Federal Party	House	10,799	62.36%
S. U. Ethiramanasingham		Cup	6,517	37.64%
Valid Votes			17,316	100.00%
Rejected Votes			153	
Total Polled			17,469	
Registered Electors			19,429	
Turnout			89.91%	

=== 1960 (July) Parliamentary General Election ===
Results of the 5th parliamentary election held on 20 July 1960 for the district:

Candidate	Party	Symbol	Votes	%
S. M. Rasamanickam	Federal Party	House	10,948	66.44%
S. U. Ethiramanasingham	All Ceylon Tamil Congress	Bicycle	5,283	32.06%
E. Ponniah		Ladder	247	1.50%
Valid Votes			16,478	100.00%
Rejected Votes			98	
Total Polled			16,576	
Registered Electors			19,429	
Turnout			85.32%	

=== 1965 Parliamentary General Election ===
Results of the 6th parliamentary election held on 22 March 1965 for the district:

Candidate	Party	Symbol	Votes	%
S. M. Rasamanickam	Federal Party	House	11,270	51.50%
S. U. Ethiramanasingham	Independent	Bird	9,140	41.77%
V. Sinnadurai		Elephant	1,472	6.73%
Valid Votes			21,882	100.00%
Rejected Votes			155	
Total Polled			22,037	
Registered Electors			25,855	
Turnout			85.23%	

=== 1970 Parliamentary General Election ===
Results of the 7th parliamentary election held on 27 May 1970 for the district:

Candidate	Party	Symbol	Votes	%
S. Thambirajah	United National Party	Elephant	13,370	51.24%
S. M. Rasamanickam	Federal Party	House	12,723	48.76%
Valid Votes			26,093	100.00%
Rejected Votes			129	
Total Polled			26,222	
Registered Electors			28,992	
Turnout			90.45%	

=== 1977 Parliamentary General Election ===
Results of the 8th parliamentary election held on 21 July 1977 for the district:

Candidate	Party	Symbol	Votes	%
P. Ganeshalingam	Tamil United Liberation Front	Sun	15,877	49.17%
S. Sivagurunathan	Lanka Sama Samaja Party	Key	5,633	17.45%
S. Thambirajah		Hand	5,590	17.31%
P. Retnasingham		Elephant	5,189	16.07%
Valid Votes			32,289	100.00%
Rejected Votes			243	
Total Polled			32,532	
Registered Electors			35,909	
Turnout			90.60%	
