= List of mayors of Batticaloa =

The Mayor of Batticaloa is the head of Batticaloa Municipal Council.

== List of mayors ==
The following were some of the city's mayors and chairmen:

=== Chairmen ===
- G. N. Tisseveresinghe - 1935
- M. Chinnaiyah - 1936–38
- N. S. Rasiah - 1939–41
- S. A. Selvanayagam - 1942–44
- K. V. M. Subramaniam - 1945–47
- . L. Tisseveresinghe - 1951–53
- D. Velupillai - 1954–56
- A. S. T. Canagasabey-1957-1959

=== Mayors ===
- Chelliah Rajadurai - 1967–68
- J. L. Tisseveresinghe - 1968–70
- K. Thiyagarajah - 1971–73
- E. Ambalavanar - 1983
- Chilyan Perinpanayagam - 1994–99
- Sivageetha Prabhakaran - 2008 - 2013
- Saravanabawan Thiyagarajah -2018 - 2023
