= H.M. Gunasekera (economist) =

Sri Lankan economist

H. M. Gunasekera
- Born: 1940; Udubadana, Sri Lanka
- Died: 2009 (aged 68–69); Kandy, Sri Lanka
- Education: University of Peradeniya; Yale University; UCLA
- Occupations: Professor, Academic, Economist, Author, Translator

Hitihamy Mudiyanselage Gunasekera (commonly known H. M. Gunasekera) was a Sri Lankan economist, professor, academic, translator and author who also served as the Chief Planner and Chief Technical Advisor to the Government of the Marshall Islands. He made contributions in the field of economics in Sri Lanka, and in the pacific islands, including Fiji, Marshall Islands, Western Samoa, and Solomon Islands. In addition, he translated several economics books into Sinhala. He has also authored and coauthored articles and books on economic development in Sri Lanka and the pacific region.

== Education ==
Gunasekera completed a Bachelor Arts Honors Degree, Economics from the University of Peradeniya in 1962. In 1967 he obtained a Masters of Arts Degree in Economics from Yale University. In 1973 he obtained a Doctor of Philosophy Degree in Economics from the University of California Los Angeles.

== Career ==
Gunasekera worked as a lecturer in Economics at the University of Peradeniya from 1971 to 1976. Some of his notable contributions were translating several English economics books into Sinhala, including the economics textbook Aarthika Vishleshana, coauthored with former Sri Lankan Central Bank Governor W. D. Lakshman. At the University of the South Pacific, Suva Fiji, he worked as a lecturer in Economics. While in USP he published several articles on the Fijian economy including its development and policy in the Journal of Pacific Studies.

He headed Vision 2018, the economic planning document for the Republic of the Marshall Islands and used for the US-RMI compact negotiations from 2002 to 2003. As the Chief Planner and Chief Technical Advisor his planning office developed two 5-year economic plans for RMI. He represented the RMI at the United Nations in the UN Trusteeship Council meeting on May 21, 1985, providing economics statistics to the council. For the 1985 Compact of Free Association Hearing, Gunasekera represented RMI along with former RMI Chief Secretary Oscar Debrum, a current Chief Justice Carl Ingram, for former president Amata Kabua.

== Personal ==
He also translated several Buddhist books by Venerable Boralande Subodha Meheni, including The Key to the Door of Nibbana or the Supreme Happiness. While a graduate student at UCLA in 1968, Gunasekera won a special judges prize in the 20th annual Robert B. Campbell student book collection competition for his article "Economic Development with Special Reference to Ceylon". Gunasekera worked with former Tongan Parliamentarian Sitiveni Halapua while at USP.
