= Bandula Lal Bandarigoda =

Sri Lankan politician

Honourable Bandula Lal Bandarigoda MP

Member of Parliament for Galle District
- In office 21 August 2024 – 24 September 2024
- Preceded by: Manusha Nanayakkara
- In office 2015–2020

Personal details
- Born: Bandula Lal Bandarigoda
- Party: Samagi Jana Balawegaya (since 2020)
- Other political affiliations: United National Party
- Education: Nagoda Royal College

Bandula Lal Bandarigoda is a Sri Lankan politician. He is a current member of the parliament of Sri Lanka for Galle District. Bandarigoda is member of the Samagi Jana Balawegaya and previously served as a member of the Southern Provincial Council, before being electing to parliament. He received his education at Nagoda Royal National College.
