= R. Thurairatnam =

Sri Lankan politician

Honourable R. Thurairatnam MPC MMC

Member of the Eastern Provincial Council for Batticaloa District
- Incumbent
- Assumed office 2008

Member of Batticaloa Municipal Council
- In office 2008–2008
- Succeeded by: Kandasamy Mahenthiraraja

Personal details
- Party: Eelam People's Revolutionary Liberation Front
- Other political affiliations: Tamil National Alliance
- Ethnicity: Sri Lankan Tamil

Rasiah Thurairatnam is a Sri Lankan Tamil politician and provincial councillor.

A member of the Padmanaba wing of the Eelam People's Revolutionary Liberation Front, Thurairatnam contested the 2008 local government election as part of an independent group and was elected to Batticaloa Municipal Council.

Thurairatnam contested the 2008 provincial council election as one of the Tamil Democratic National Alliance's candidates in Batticaloa District and was elected to the Eastern Provincial Council (EPC). Thurairatnam and other newly elected provincial councillors took their oaths on 16 May 2008 in front of President Mahinda Rajapaksa.

Thurairatnam contested the 2012 provincial council election as one of the Tamil National Alliance's candidates in Batticaloa District and was re-elected to the (EPC). Thurairatnam and the other newly elected TNA provincial councillors took their oaths on 28 September 2012 in front of TNA leader and Member of Parliament R. Sampanthan.
