= P. R. Selvanayagam =

Sri Lankan politician

Hon. P. R. Selvanayagam

Member of the Ceylon Parliament for Batticaloa
- In office 1970–1977
- Preceded by: Abdul Lathiff Sinnalebbe
- Succeeded by: M. L. Ahamed Fareeth

Personal details
- Born: 10 August 1936 (age 89)
- Ethnicity: Sri Lankan Tamil

Princely Rajendran Selvanayagam (born 10 August 1936) was a Sri Lankan Tamil politician and Member of Parliament.

Selvanayagam stood as an independent candidate in Batticaloa at the 1970 parliamentary election. He came second and entered Parliament as the second member for Batticaloa. He failed in his re-election bid at the 1977 parliamentary election after placing fifth.
