= M. L. Ahamed Fareeth =

Sri Lankan politician

Hon. M. L. Ahamed Fareeth

Member of Parliament for Batticaloa
- In office 1977–1985
- Preceded by: P. R. Selvanayagam
- Succeeded by: Ahamed Rizvi Sinnalebbe

Personal details
- Born: 18 April 1940
- Died: 10 September 1985 (aged 45)
- Party: United National Party

Meera Lebbe Ahamed Fareeth (18 April 1940 – 10 September 1985) was a Sri Lankan politician and Member of Parliament for Batticaloa.
