= Kalana Jinadasa =

Sri Lankan naval officer

- Military career
- Allegiance: Sri Lanka
- Branch: Sri Lanka Navy
- Service years: 1987 - 2019
- Rank: Commodore
- Conflicts: Sri Lankan Civil War
- Awards: Rana Sura Padakkama; Uttama Seva Padakkama; Sri Lanka Armed Services Long Service Medal

Aramabaduge Kalana Miththa Jinadasa is a Sri Lankan naval officer and former Commandant of the Navy's Naval and Maritime Academy. He was the first Flag Officer Sea Training (FOST), former Director Naval Operations, Director Foreign Cooperation, Director Maritime Special Forces, Director Maritime Surveillance, Director Naval Inspectorate and Deputy Director Naval Operations.

Educated at the Royal College Colombo, from 1975 to 1987 he joined the Sri Lankan Navy as an Officer Cadet in 1987. Having been commissioned as a Sub-Lieutenant, after successfully completing the International Midshipmen course at prestigious Britannia Royal Naval College by winning the Best International Midshipman award, he served in many capacities. These included Senior Staff Officer Operations at Naval Headquarters and at the Northern Naval Command. He graduated from the U.S. Naval War College.
