= Deniyaya Electoral District =

Electoral district of Sri Lanka

Deniyaya electoral district was an electoral district of Sri Lanka between August 1947 and February 1989. The district was named after the town of Deniyaya in Matara District, Southern Province. The 1978 Constitution of Sri Lanka introduced the proportional representation electoral system for electing members of Parliament. The existing 160 mainly single-member electoral districts were replaced with 22 multi-member electoral districts. Deniyaya electoral district was replaced by the Matara multi-member electoral district at the 1989 general elections, the first under the proportional representation system.

== Members of Parliament ==
Key

Independent SLFP UNP LSSP

Election	Member	Party	Term
1947	V. G. W. Ratnayake	Independent	1947-1952
1952	V. G. W. Ratnayake	United National Party	1952-1956
1956	S. W. D. Ratnayake	Sri Lanka Freedom Party	1956-1960
1960 (March)	P. L. Jinadasa	United National Party	1960
1960 (July)	S. W. Dahanayake	United National Party	1960-1965
1965	C. N. Kannangara	United National Party	1965-1970
1970	Sumanapala Dahanayake	Lanka Sama Samaja Party	1970-1977
1977	Keerthisena Abeywickrama	United National Party	1977-1987
1987 appointment	Keerthilatha Abeywickrama	United National Party	1987-1989

== Elections ==
=== 1947 Parliamentary General Election ===
Results of the 1st parliamentary election held between 23 August 1947 and 20 September 1947:

Candidate	Party	Symbol	Votes	%
V. G. W. Ratnayake	Independent	Pair of Scales	4,510	30.69
D. W. S. Ratnayaka	Independent	Cup	3,793	25.81
Don Roy Rajapakse	Independent	Elephant	2,938	19.99
D. C. Hettige	Independent	Umbrella	2,282	15.53
G. E. Abeynaike		Hand	667	4.54
Valid Votes			14,190	96.57
Rejected Votes			504	3.43
Total Polled			14,694	100.00
Registered Electors			29,542	
Turnout				49.74

=== 1952 Parliamentary General Election ===
Results of the 2nd parliamentary election held between 24 May 1952 and 30 May 1952:

Candidate	Party	Symbol	Votes	%
V. G. W. Ratnayake	United National Party	Elephant	13,808	59.52
Edward R. Goonatilleke	Communist Party of Ceylon	Star	9,174	39.55
Valid Votes			22,982	99.07
Rejected Votes			216	0.93
Total Polled			23,198	100.00
Registered Electors			32,842	
Turnout				70.64

=== 1956 Parliamentary General Election ===
Results of the 3rd parliamentary election held between 5 April 1956 and 10 April 1956:

Candidate	Party	Symbol	Votes	%
S. W. D. Ratnayake	Sri Lanka Freedom Party	Hand	16,170	59.54
V. G. W. Ratnayake	United National Party	Elephant	10,710	39.44
Valid Votes			26,880	98.98
Rejected Votes			277	1.02
Total Polled			27,157	100.00
Registered Electors			39,012	
Turnout				69.61

=== 1960 (March) Parliamentary General Election ===
Results of the 4th parliamentary election held on 19 March 1960:

Candidate	Party	Symbol	Votes	%
P. L. Jinadasa	United National Party	Elephant	6,555	35.64
Charles Nissanka Kannangara	Mahajana Eksath Peramuna	Cartwheel	5,586	30.37
Sumanapala Dahanayake	Sri Lanka Freedom Party	Hand	3,903	21.22
Edward R. Goonatilleke	Communist Party of Ceylon	Star	2,178	11.84
Valid Votes			18,222	99.06
Rejected Votes			173	0.94
Total Polled			18,395	100.00
Registered Electors			23,459	
Turnout				78.41

P. L. Jinadasa died before he was sworn into office.

=== 1960 (July) Parliamentary General Election ===
Results of the 5th parliamentary election held on 20 July 1960:

Candidate	Party	Symbol	Votes	%
S. W. Dahanayake	United National Party	Elephant	10,254	57.78
M. D. Yapa	Sri Lanka Freedom Party	Hand	7,410	41.76
Valid Votes			17,664	99.54
Rejected Votes			82	0.46
Total Polled			17,746	100.00
Registered Electors			23,459	
Turnout				75.65

=== 1965 Parliamentary General Election ===
Results of the 6th parliamentary election held on 22 March 1965:

Candidate	Party	Symbol	Votes	%
Charles Nissanka Kannangara	United National Party	Elephant	13,171	53.04
D. S. Wijesekera	Lanka Sama Samaja Party	Key	11,052	44.50
Sepala Ratnayake	Mahajana Eksath Peramuna	Cartwheel	374	1.51
Valid Votes			24,597	99.05
Rejected Votes			237	0.95
Total Polled			24,834	100.00
Registered Electors			30,474	
Turnout				81.49

=== 1970 Parliamentary General Election ===
Results of the 7th parliamentary election held on 27 May 1970:

Candidate	Party	Symbol	Votes	%
Sumanapala Dahanayake	Lanka Sama Samaja Party	Key	18,760	60.62
Charles Nissanka Kannangara	United National Party	Elephant	12,076	39.03
Valid Votes			30,836	99.65
Rejected Votes			107	0.35
Total Polled			30,943	100.00
Registered Electors			36,444	
Turnout				84.91

=== 1977 Parliamentary General Election ===
Results of the 8th parliamentary election held on 21 July 1977:

Candidate	Party	Symbol	Votes	%
Keerthisena Abeywickrama	United National Party	Elephant	20,365	56.74
Edward R. Goonatilleke	Sri Lanka Freedom Party	Hand	15,032	41.88
Hattotuwa Gamage Weerasinghe	Lanka Sama Samaja Party	Key	390	1.09
Valid Votes			35,787	99.71
Rejected Votes			103	0.29
Total Polled			35,890	100.00
Registered Electors			40,357	
Turnout				88.93

Keerthisena Abeywickrama was killed in the 1987 grenade attack in the Sri Lankan Parliament, his seat on parliament was filled by his sister, Keerthilatha Abeywickrama.
