= Charles Dahanayake =

Sri Lankan academic

- Born: Hiyare, Galle, Sri Lanka
- Education: Vidyaloka College, Galle, Ananda College, University of Ceylon, University of Bristol, University of Rochester
- Occupation: Academic

Charles Dahanayake (also known as C. Dahanayke) was a Sri Lankan born academic who was the founder professor of physics and former dean of Faculty of Science, University of Kelaniya. The author and translator of many Sinhalese physics books, he was the founding president of the Institute of Physics, Sri Lanka (IPSL).

== Life and career ==
Charles Dahanayake was born on 8 February 1928 at Hiyare, Galle and had his early education at the village school. After completing his first certificate examination, then known as the Junior School Certificate (JSC), he moved to Vidyaloka College in Galle and sat the JSC in the English medium in 1944. In order to study science, he entered to the Senior Form at Ananda College in Colombo in 1945. During the next two years, he surprised everyone by passing the Senior School Certificate (SSC) with Arts subjects, the SSC with Science subjects, London Matriculation, and the University Entrance Examinations and being awarded the entrance Mathematics scholarship.

He entered the University of Ceylon in 1947 to follow the Special Degree Course in mathematics. He won the Muncherji Framji Khan Prize at the end of his first year at the university and got permission to complete the special degree in three years. By that time he was fond of physics and to the disappointment of the professor of mathematics, he moved to the Department of Physics to follow the Special Degree Course in physics. He graduated with a first class (honors) in physics in 1951.

Dr. Dahanayake joined the Department of Physics of the University of Ceylon, Colombo in 1951 as an assistant lecturer. He then went to the United Kingdom in 1953 on a Ceylon University Government Scholarship to do his graduate studies at the University of Bristol. At Bristol he carried out research work on cosmic rays under Professor C. F. Powell, FRS and Nobel Laureate. In 1956, he obtained his PhD in high-energy particle physics.

Dr. Dahanayake returned to the University of Ceylon, Colombo soon after he earned his PhD and continued his research work on cosmic radiation. He was promoted to the lecturer grade II in 1956 and to the lecturer grade I in 1961. In 1962, he went to the University of Rochester, US, on a Fulbright Post Doctoral Research fellowship to carry out research on primary cosmic rays during his sabbatical leave period. In the period July 1963 to September 1967 he worked at the University of Ceylon, Peradeniya, as a senior lecturer and continued his research on fundamental particles.

Dr. Dahanayake came to the Vidyalankara University (now the University of Kelaniya) in September 1967 as the founder professor of physics, in its newly inaugurated Faculty of Science. He was also the founder Dean of Faculty of Science, University of Kelaniya and the founder head of the Department of Physics. One of his major contributions to the University of Kelaniya, and in particular to the Faculty of Science, is the effort he put in as dean of science in getting the faculty onto a sound footing. Dr. Dahanayake nursed the faculty from its infancy to maturity.

Dr. Dahanayake retired from the University of Kelaniya on 31 July 1993. He then continued as the professor of physics on contract basis till April 1996. He had the distinction of having served 45 years in Sri Lankan Universities, of which 29 years at the University of Kelaniya. Charles Dahanayake died on 14 February 2009, at the age of 81 years.
