= S. U. Ethirmanasingham =

Ceylon Tamil businessman and politician (born 1915)

Hon. S. U. Ethirmanasingham MP

Member of the Ceylonese Parliament for Paddiruppu
- In office 20 September 1947 – 30 May 1952
- Succeeded by: S. M. Rasamanickam
- In office 10 April 1956 – 19 March 1960
- Preceded by: S. M. Rasamanickam
- Succeeded by: S. M. Rasamanickam

Personal details
- Born: 25 July 1915
- Ethnicity: Ceylon Tamil

Somasunderam Udayar Ethirmanasingham MBE (born 25 July 1915, date of death unknown) was a Ceylon Tamil businessman and politician who served as a Member of Parliament.

== Early life ==
Ethirmanasingham was born on 25 July 1915. He was from Paddiruppu in eastern Ceylon. He was educated at St. Mary's College and Lee High School, Kalmunai.

== Career ==
Ethirmanasingham had several jobs before becoming a successful businessman.

Ethirmanasingham stood as an independent candidate in Paddiruppu at the 1947 parliamentary election. He won the election and entered Parliament. He stood as the United National Party's candidate at the 1952 parliamentary election but was defeated by S. M. Rasamanickam. He re-gained the seat at the 1956 parliamentary election, contesting as an independent. However, he lost the seat again to Rasamanickam at the March 1960 parliamentary election. He was also unsuccessful at the July 1960 and 1965 parliamentary elections.
