= Ravi Arunthavanathan =

Sri Lankan air force officer

- Military career
- Allegiance: Sri Lanka
- Branch: Sri Lanka Air Force
- Rank: Air Vice Marshal
- Unit: SLAF Regiment
- Conflicts: Sri Lankan Civil War
- Awards: Rana Wickrama Padakkama, Rana Sura Padakkama, Vishista Seva Vibhushanaya, Uttama Seva Padakkama
- Other work: Additional Secretary, Ministry of Defence

Air Vice Marshal Ravi Arunthavanathan, RWP, RSP, VSV, USP, psc, SLAF was the former Deputy Chief of Staff of the Sri Lanka Air Force and current Additional Secretary, Ministry of Defence.

Educated at Richmond College, Galle where he was an outstanding cricketer, he joined the Sri Lanka Air Force as an Officer Cadet in 1972. After successful completion of Basic Training he was commissioned as a Pilot Officer in the SLAF Regiment. He holds an MSc in Defence Studies and management.

Arunthavanathan was an Officer Instructor at the Ground Combat and Recruit Training Unit at SLAF Diyatalawa was in change of Staff Officer Training (GH) at Air Headquarters, SLAF Colombo. He had served as the Base Commander, SLAF China Bay and Zonal Commander, East. He had also served as aide-de-camp to three Air Force Commanders.

Air Vice Marshal Ravi Arunthavanathan has been awarded the gallantry medals Rana Wickrama Padakkama and Rana Sura Padakkama for individual acts of bravery, the service medals Vishista Seva Vibhushanaya, Uttama Seva Padakkama and Sri Lanka Armed Services Long Service Medal.
