= Abdul Lathiff Sinnalebbe =

Sri Lankan Politician

Abdul Latiff Sinnalebbe (born 16 November 1932) was a Ceylonese politician. He was the second member of Parliament of Sri Lanka from Batticaloa representing the United National Party from 1965 to 1970. His father Mudaliar Ahamed Lebbe Sinne Lebbe and his son Ahamed Rizvi Sinnalebbe, both represented Batticaloa in parliament.

== See also ==
- List of political families in Sri Lanka
