= C. Rajadurai =

Sri Lankan Tamil politician (1927–2025)

C. Rajadurai JP, UM
- செ. இராசதுரை

Member of the Ceylonese Parliament for Batticaloa
- In office 1956–1989
- Preceded by: R. B. Kadramer
- Succeeded by: Constituency abolished

1st Mayor of Batticaloa
- In office 1967–1968
- Preceded by: Office established
- Succeeded by: J. L. Tissaveerasinghe

Personal details
- Born: 27 July 1927 Batticaloa District, British Ceylon
- Died: 7 December 2025 (aged 98) Chennai, Tamil Nadu, India
- Party: United National Party (after 1979); Ilankai Tamil Arasu Kachchi (before 1979)

Chelliah Rajadurai (Tamil: செல்லையா இராசதுரை; 27 July 1927 – 7 December 2025) was a Sri Lankan Tamil politician, government minister, and Member of Parliament. He served as the first Mayor of Batticaloa from 1967 to 1968.

== Early life ==
Rajadurai was born on 27 July 1927. He was a journalist and a member of the editorial staff of the Sutantiran weekly newspaper.

== Political career ==
Rajadurai was elected to elected to parliament at the 1956 parliamentary election as the Ilankai Tamil Arasu Kachchi candidate for Batticaloa. He was re-elected in March 1960, July 1960, 1965 and 1970. He ran again as the Tamil United Liberation Front candidate for Batticaloa in the 1977 parliamentary election and was re-elected.

In March 1979, Rajadurai defected to the United National Party, the then-ruling party, and was rewarded by being appointed Minister of Regional Development and Hindu Cultural Affairs. He was later appointed as the Sri Lankan High Commissioner to Malaysia.

Rajadurai became the first Mayor of Batticaloa in 1967. He was unseated the next year.

== Personal life and death ==
Rajadurai was still politically active in April 2012. In June 2021, he was retired and lived between Malaysia, India and Sri Lanka.

Rajadurai died in Chennai, India on 7 December 2025, at the age of 98.

== See also ==
- List of Sri Lankan non-career diplomats
