= Anoma Gamage =

Sri Lankan politician

Hon. Anoma Gamage MP
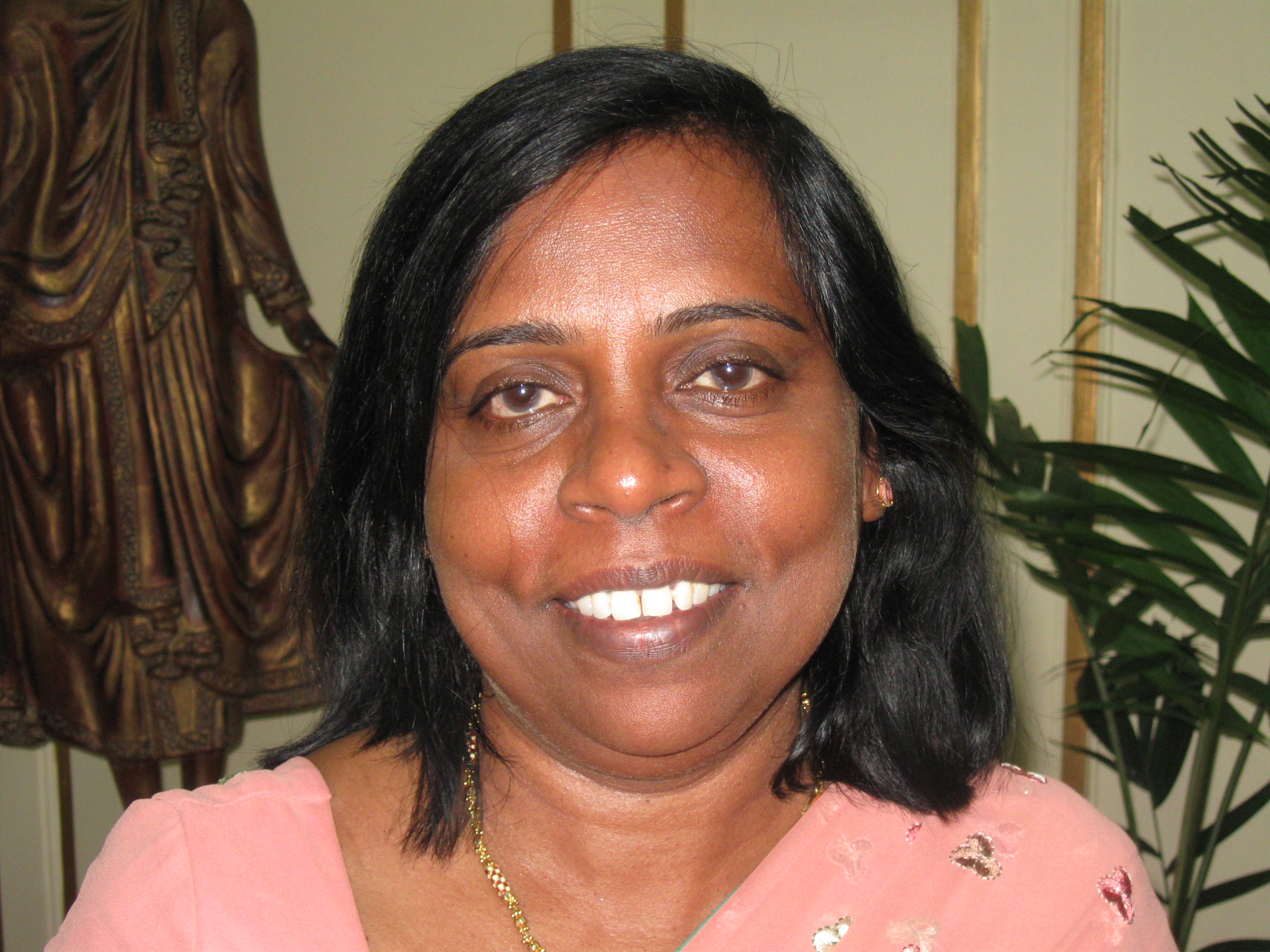

Member of Parliament for National List
- In office 2010–2020

Deputy Minister of Petroleum Resources Development
- In office 12 January 2015 – 22 March 2015
- President: Maithripala Sirisena
- Prime Minister: Ranil Wickremesinghe

Personal details
- Party: United National Party
- Spouse: Daya Gamage

Anoma Gamage is a Sri Lankan politician, a member of the Parliament of Sri Lanka. She was appointed as the Deputy Minister of Irrigation and Agriculture in January 2015 and Deputy Minister of Petroleum and Petroleum Gas in September 2015 by President Maithripala Sirisena. Mrs. Gamage is married to United National Party National Organizer & Minister Daya Gamage.

Mrs. Gamage graduated from University of Peradeniya Bachelor's degree in Veterinary Medicine Science.

== See also ==
- List of political families in Sri Lanka
