= S. Thambirajah =

Sri Lankan politician

Hon. S. Thambirajah MP

Member of the Ceylonese Parliament for Paddiruppu
- In office 1970–1977
- Preceded by: S. M. Rasamanickam
- Succeeded by: P. Ganeshalingam

Personal details
- Born: 10 November 1917
- Party: Sri Lanka Freedom Party
- Ethnicity: Sri Lankan Tamil

Somasuntheram Thambirajah was a Sri Lankan Tamil politician and Member of Parliament.

Thambirajah was born on 10 November 1917.

He entered Parliament by winning the 1970 parliamentary election as the United National Party's candidate in Paddiruppu. He contested the 1977 parliamentary election as the Sri Lanka Freedom Party but failed to get re-elected, coming third.
