= Batticaloa Electoral District (1947–1989) =

Electoral district of Sri Lanka

Coordinates: 7.7167°N 81.7000°E

Batticaloa Electoral District was an electoral district of Sri Lanka between August 1947 and February 1989. The district was named after the city of Batticaloa in Batticaloa District, Eastern Province. The district was a two-member constituency between March 1960 and February 1989. The 1978 Constitution of Sri Lanka introduced the proportional representation electoral system for electing members of Parliament. The existing 160 mainly single-member electoral districts were replaced with 22 multi-member electoral districts. Batticaloa electoral district was replaced by the Batticaloa multi-member electoral district at the 1989 general elections, the first under the PR system, though Batticaloa continues to be a polling division of the multi-member electoral district.

== Members of Parliament ==
Key

Independent ITAK TULF UNP

Election	Member	Party	Term
1947	Ahamed Lebbe Sinne Lebbe	UNP	1947-1952
1952	R. B. Kadramer	Ind.	1952-1956
1956	C. Rajadurai	ITAK	1956-1960

Election	Member 1	Party	Term	Member 2	Party	Term
1960 (March)	C. Rajadurai	ITAK	1960	Ahmed Hussain Macan Markar	Ind.	1960
1960 (July)	C. Rajadurai	ITAK	1960-1965	Ahmed Hussain Macan Markar	UNP	1960-1965
1965	C. Rajadurai	ITAK	1965-1970	Abdul Lathiff Sinnalebbe	UNP	1965-1970
1970	C. Rajadurai	ITAK	1970-1977	P. R. Selvanayagam	Ind.	1970-1977
1977	C. Rajadurai	TULF	1977-1989	M. L. Ahamed Fareeth	UNP	1977-1985
1977	C. Rajadurai	TULF	1977-1989	Ahamed Rizvi Sinnalebbe	UNP	1985-1989

== Elections ==
=== 1947 Parliamentary General Election ===
Results of the 1st parliamentary election held between 23 August 1947 and 20 September 1947:

Candidate	Party	Symbol	Votes	%
Ahamed Lebbe Sinne Lebbe	United National Party	Tree	4,740	35.40%
K. V. M. Subramaniam	Independent	Key	3,395	25.36%
R. B. Kadramer	Independent	Umbrella	2,313	17.28%
N. S. Rasiah	Independent	Cup	2,226	16.63%
E. Rasiah	Independent	Hand	714	5.33%
Valid Votes			13,388	100.00%
Rejected Votes			324	
Total Polled			13,712	
Registered Electors			27,409	
Turnout			50.03%	

=== 1952 Parliamentary General Election ===
Results of the 2nd parliamentary election held between 24 May 1952 and 30 May 1952:

Candidate	Party	Symbol	Votes	%
R. B. Kadramer	Independent	Elephant	11,420	58.93%
Ahamed Lebbe Sinne Lebbe	United National Party	Tree	7,960	41.07%
Valid Votes			19,380	100.00%
Rejected Votes			260	
Total Polled			19,640	
Registered Electors			24,947	
Turnout			78.73%	

=== 1956 Parliamentary General Election ===
Results of the 3rd parliamentary election held between 5 April 1956 and 10 April 1956:

Candidate	Party	Symbol	Votes	%
C. Rajadurai	Illankai Tamil Arasu Kachchi	House	9,300	52.05%
S. Ahamathulebbe		Tree	7,124	39.87%
R. B. Kadramer	Batticaloa Tamil Speakers Front	Pair of Scales	1,296	7.25%
A. Thavarajah		Bicycle	148	0.83%
Valid Votes			17,868	100.00%
Rejected Votes			288	
Total Polled			18,156	
Registered Electors			29,486	
Turnout			61.57%	

=== 1960 (March) Parliamentary General Election ===
Results of the 4th parliamentary election held on 19 March 1960:

Candidate	Party	Symbol	Votes	%
C. Rajadurai	Illankai Tamil Arasu Kachchi	House	28,309	47.62%
Ahmed Hussain Macan Markar	Independent	Cockerel	22,893	38.51%
T. Mylvaganam		Ladder	8,242	13.87%
Valid Votes			59,444	100.00%
Rejected Votes			964	
Total Polled			60,408	
Registered Electors			37,832	
Turnout			159.67%	

=== 1960 (July) Parliamentary General Election ===
Results of the 5th parliamentary election held on 20 July 1960:

Candidate	Party	Symbol	Votes	%
C. Rajadurai	Illankai Tamil Arasu Kachchi	House	29,853	52.68%
Ahmed Hussain Macan Markar	United National Party	Elephant	22,031	38.88%
Abdul Lathiff Sinnalebbe	Illankai Tamil Arasu Kachchi	Pair of Spectacles	2,484	4.38%
K. N. Kumaraswamy		Cockerel	2,300	4.06%
Valid Votes			56,668	100.00%
Rejected Votes			954	
Total Polled			57,622	
Registered Electors			37,832	
Turnout			152.31%	

=== 1965 Parliamentary General Election ===
Results of the 6th parliamentary election held on 22 March 1965:

Candidate	Party	Symbol	Votes	%
C. Rajadurai	Illankai Tamil Arasu Kachchi	House	29,023	43.47%
Abdul Lathiff Sinnalebbe	United National Party	Elephant	12,010	17.99%
Ahmed Hussain Macan Markar		Cockerel	9,915	14.85%
J. L. Tissaveerasinghe	All Ceylon Tamil Congress	Bicycle	8,107	12.14%
A. Ahamed Lebbe		Umbrella	4,572	6.85%
S. Nadarajah		Chair	2,298	3.44%
S. Vinayagamani	Communist Party	Star	833	1.25%
Valid Votes			66,758	100.00%
Rejected Votes			1,124	
Total Polled			67,882	
Registered Electors			45,078	
Turnout			150.59%	

=== 1970 Parliamentary General Election ===
Results of the 7th parliamentary election held on 27 May 1970:

Candidate	Party	Symbol	Votes	%
C. Rajadurai	Illankai Tamil Arasu Kachchi	House	27,661	33.17%
P. R. Selvanayagam	Independent	Lamp	23,082	27.68%
Ahmed Hussain Macan Markar	United National Party	Elephant	17,015	20.41%
M. A. C. A. Rahuman	Sri Lanka Freedom Party	Hand	14,805	17.76%
S. J. Arasaratnam		Cockerel	624	0.75%
T. Francis Xavier		Pair of Scales	196	0.24%
Valid Votes			83,383	100.00%
Rejected Votes			1,298	
Total Polled			84,681	
Registered Electors			51,524	
Turnout			164.35%	

=== 1977 Parliamentary General Election ===
Results of the 8th parliamentary election held on 21 July 1977:

Candidate	Party	Symbol	Votes	%
C. Rajadurai	Tamil United Liberation Front	Sun	26,648	24.70%
M. L. Ahamed Fareeth	United National Party	Elephant	25,345	23.49%
Kasi Ananthan	Tamil United Liberation Front	House	22,443	20.80%
Badiudin Mahmud	Sri Lanka Freedom Party	Hand	21,275	19.72%
P. R. Selvanayagam		Lamp	11,797	10.93%
Vinayagamoorthy Vettivel		Umbrella	383	0.35%
Valid Votes			107,891	100.00%
Rejected Votes			1,618	
Total Polled			109,509	
Registered Electors			63,039	
Turnout			173.72%	

M. L. Ahamed Fareeth died on 10 September 1985. His replacement Ahamed Rizvi Sinnalebbe was nominated on 25 October 1985.
