= M. M. M. Najim =

Mohamed Mujithaba Mohamed Najim
- Born: 6 March 1968 (age 58); Navinna, Galle
- Education: Vidyaloka College, Galle; Richmond College, Galle; University of Peradeniya, Sri Lanka; Asian Institute of Technology, Thailand; University Putra Malaysia
- Occupations: Vice Chancellor, South Eastern University of Sri Lanka (From June 2015)
- Spouse: M. S. N. Husna
- Parents: A. W. M. Mujithaba (father); M. H. Fathima (mother)

Mohamed Mujithaba Mohamed Najim (or M. M. M. Najim) is the fourth Vice Chancellor of the South Eastern University of Sri Lanka since June 2015. He is the youngest Vice Chancellor appointed to the South Eastern University of Sri Lanka. He is a Professor in Environmental Conservation and Management attached to the Department of Zoology and Environmental Management, University of Kelaniya and has done extraordinary service to Sri Lanka as an Environmentalist. He was awarded many presidential awards for the scientific research he has done on water resources management.

Najim has conducted several Scientific studies and rendered his services to several government and non governmental institutions as an environmentalist, agriculturist, agricultural engineer and bio-systems engineer.

== Early life ==
Najim was born in Galle, Sri Lanka on 6 March 1968. He completed his primary education from Vidyaloka College, Galle and secondary education from Richmond College, Galle. He entered Faculty of Agriculture, University of Peradeniya in 1990 and obtained his BSc. in Agriculture in 1994 specialized in Agricultural Engineering.

== Higher Education ==
He entered Asian Institute of Technology, Thailand in 1998 and earned an M.Eng. in Irrigation Engineering and Management in 2000. He completed his Doctor of Philosophy in Water Resources Engineering at University Putra Malaysia (UPM), Malaysia in 2004. His PhD work is in the field of application of knowledge engineering to develop an expert system or a decision support system for integrated water management in a paddy estate. His main research interests are on agricultural water management, hydrological modeling, environmental flow and water resources management.

== Positions ==
Najim entered into the academic services soon after his graduation from the University of Peradeniya in 1994. He served at the Department of Agricultural Engineering as an assistant lecturer from 1994 to 1996 and joined Sabaragamuwa University of Sri Lanka as a lecturer in 1996 and served till 1998. In 1998, Najim rejoined the Department of Agricultural Engineering, University of Peradeniya as a lecturer and served until 2007. He was promoted to a senior lecturer in 2006. In 2007, Dr. Najim joined Department of Zoology and Environmental Management, University of Kelaniya as a senior lecturer and promoted to a Professor in Environmental Conservation and Management in 2012. He was appointed by His Excellency Maithripala Sirisena, President of Sri Lanka as the Vice Chancellor of the South Eastern University of Sri Lanka from June 2015.

Professor Najim has held many positions in many professional societies such as

- General Secretary of the Sri Lanka Association for the Advancement of Science (SLAAS) in 2012, 2013, 2014 and 2015 (up to June)
- Secretary – International Relations of the Sri Lanka Association for the Advancement of Science (SLAAS) in 2009 and 2010.
- Joint Secretary of the Sri Lanka Association for Fisheries and Aquatic Resources (SLAFAR) in 2008/2009, 2009/2010.
- President of SLAAS Section B for the year 2008.

== Other ==
Professor Najim is a recipient of many prestigious awards such as Presidential Award for Research and Popularization of Science Award. He has contributed tremendously in hydrological modeling of ungauged rivers and assisted in studies on the viability in mini-hydropower projects. The methodology proposed by him and published in the high impact journal Environmental Modeling and Software is being used in evaluation and decision making in allocating environmental flows in designing mini-hydropower projects.

Professor Najim has also assisted the Ministry of Education, Sri Lanka and National Institute of Education, Sri Lanka in the formulation of the G.C.E. Advanced Level syllabuses of Agriculture and Biosystems technology and trained teachers in delivery of the contents of those syllabuses.

Professor Najim is a life member of many professional societies such as

- Institute of Biology
- Sri Lanka Association for Fisheries and Aquatic Resources (SLAFAR)
- Sri Lanka Association for the Advancement of Science (SLAAS)
- Agricultural Engineering Society of Sri Lanka
- Geo-Informatics Society of Sri Lanka
- Soil Science Society of Sri Lanka
