= Renuka Rowel =

Sri Lanka Army general

- Military career
- Allegiance: Sri Lanka
- Branch: Sri Lanka Signals Corps
- Service years: 1981 –
- Rank: Major General
- Unit: First Regiment of Sri Lanka Signal Corps
- Conflicts: Sri Lankan Civil War
- Awards: RWP, USP, ndu, psc, USACGSC

Major General Renuka Rowel, RWP, USP was a Sri Lankan Army general. He was the 10th Colonel Commandant of the Sri Lanka Signals Corps and the Chief Signal Officer of Sri Lanka Army.

== Education ==
Rowel holds a bachelor's degree in electronics engineering from University of Moratuwa, Sri Lanka. In addition to that he became the first in the Order of Merit at the Army Command and Staff Course conducted at the Army Command and Staff College, Sri Lanka. Further, he is an alumnus of the United States Army Command and General Staff College and the National Defense University, Pakistan. In addition, he has followed the Senior Command Course in India, Mid Career Course in Pakistan, Signal Officers’ Advance Course in US and the Signal Young Officers’ Course in India. Rowel received his school education from Athurugiriya Maha Vidyalaya, Vidyaloka College, Galle, Richmond College, Galle and Tissa Central, Kalutara.

== Military career ==
He was enlisted to the Army in October 1981 and commissioned to the Sri Lanka Signal Corps as a Second Lieutenant after commpleting his Bachelor of Science Engineering Degree in Electronics at the Sir John Kotelawala Defence Academy and University of Moratuwa. Rowel, who has served for over 33 years in the Sri Lanka Army, has experience in Command, Staff and Instructional appointments and in the field of Information and Telecommunication engineering. He is involved in the infrastructure development of the Sri Lanka Army Trunk Communication Network, as well as the initiation of the military's Cyber Security Framework and introduction of the Sri Lanka Army Data Network (SLADN).
