= S. M. Rasamanickam =

Sri Lankan politician (1913–1974)

Hon. S. M. Rasamanickam MP

Member of the Ceylonese Parliament for Paddiruppu
- In office 1952–1956
- Preceded by: S. U. Ethiramanasingham
- Succeeded by: S. U. Ethiramanasingham
- In office 1960–1970
- Preceded by: S. U. Ethiramanasingham
- Succeeded by: S. Thambirajah

Personal details
- Born: 20 January 1913 Mandur, Ceylon
- Died: 7 October 1974 (aged 61)
- Party: Illankai Tamil Arasu Kachchi
- Other political affiliations: Tamil United Liberation Front
- Ethnicity: Ceylon Tamil

Sinnappu Moothathamby Rasamanickam (20 January 1913 – 7 October 1974) was a Ceylon Tamil politician and Member of Parliament.

== Early life ==
Rasamanickam was born on 20 January 1913. He was from Mandur in eastern Ceylon.

== Career ==
After his education Rasamanickam joined the government service as an Assistant Food Controller.

Rasamanickam stood as an independent candidate in Paddiruppu at the 1947 parliamentary election but was defeated by S. U. Ethiramanasingham. However, he won the 1952 parliamentary election and entered Parliament. He stood as the Illankai Tamil Arasu Kachchi's (Federal Party) candidate at the 1956 parliamentary election but was again defeated by Ethiramanasingham. He re-gained the seat at the March 1960 parliamentary election. He was re-elected at the July 1960 and 1965 parliamentary elections but was defeated at the 1970 parliamentary election by the United National Party candidate S. Thambirajah.

Rasamanickam was president of ITAK and Tamil United Liberation Front.
