= Morawaka =

Morawaka මොරවක
- Location within Sri Lanka
- Coordinates: 6.260217°N 80.492148°E
- Country: Sri Lanka
- Province: Southern Province
- District: Matara
- Divisional Secretariat: Pitabeddara
- Elevation: 85 m (279 ft)
- Time zone: UTC+5:30 (Sri Lanka Standard Time Zone)
  - Summer (DST): UTC+6 (Summer time)
- Post Code: 8140

Morawaka (Sinhala: මොරවක) is a small town in the Matara District, Southern Province of Sri Lanka, a centre of Ceylon tea plantations and rice paddies. Additionally, Morawaka is said to have gem resources.

Located at an elevation of 85 m (279 ft), at the intersection of the A17 (Akuressa – Deniyaya) highway and the B363 road. It is approximately 65 km (40 mi) northeast of Galle and 144 km (89 mi) from Colombo.

== Education ==
- Morawaka Keerthi Abeywickrama National School
- Morawaka Kanishta Vidyalaya
- Rambukana prathamika Vidyalaya
- Alapaladeniya Primary School

== See also ==
- List of towns in Southern Province, Sri Lanka
