= Daya Gamage =

Sri Lankan politician and businessman

Hon. Daya Gamage MP
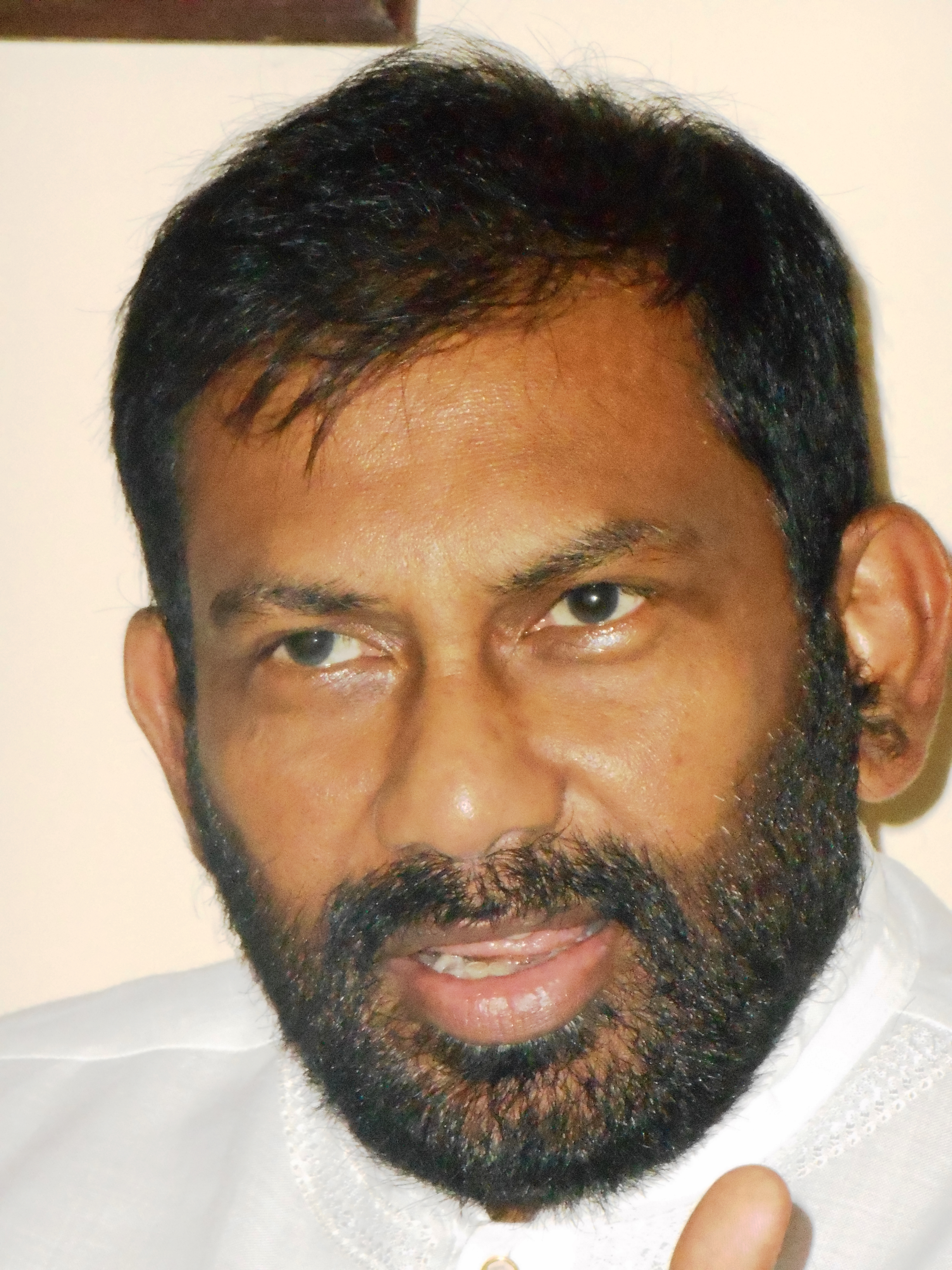

Minister of Primary Industries
- In office 4 September 2015 – 21 November 2019
- President: Maithripala Sirisena
- Prime Minister: Ranil Wickremesinghe

Member of Parliament for Ampara District
- In office 1 September 2015 – 3 March 2020

Member of the Eastern Provincial Council for Ampara District
- In office 2008–2015

Personal details
- Party: United National Party
- Spouse: Anoma Gamage
- Occupation: Businessman
- Website: Dayagamage.com

Daya Dharmapala Kilittuwa Gamage is a Sri Lankan politician and businessman. He is a member of parliament (MP) and former Minister of Primary Industries. And he also the national organizer for the United National Party (UNP). He elected to the Parliament of Sri Lanka at the 2015 Parliamentary Election from Ampara District by obtaining 70,201 preferential votes.

Daya Gamage was elected to the Eastern Provincial Council following the 1st Eastern provincial council election held on 10 May 2008. He was re-elected at the 2nd Eastern Provincial Council election held on 8 September 2012. He served as leader of the opposition for part of the 1st Eastern Provincial Council.

== See also ==
- List of political families in Sri Lanka
- Tamil Tigers' Debt to America
