= Nagoda =

- Country: Sri Lanka
- Province: Southern Province
- District: Galle
- Time zone: UTC+5:30 (Sri Lanka Standard Time)
- Postal code: 80110

Nagoda is a small town in Sri Lanka. It is located within Southern Province.

== See also ==
- List of towns in Western Province, Sri Lanka
