= Nagoda Royal National College =

- නාගොඞ රාජකීය ජාතික විද්‍යාලය

Location
- Nagoda road Nagoda; Sri Lanka
- Coordinates: 6°11′37.30″N 80°16′36.90″E

Information
- School type: Public national 1AB
- Founded: 1876; 150 years ago
- School district: Udugama Education Zone
- Authority: Ministry of Education
- Principal: Saman Jayalal
- Website: nagodaroyal.sch.lk

Nagoda Royal National College (Sinhala: නාගොඞ රාජකීය ජාතික විද්‍යාලය; also known as Royal College Nagoda or Nagoda Royal College or Rajakeeya National School) is a national school in Nagoda, Sri Lanka.

== See also ==
- List of schools in Southern Province, Sri Lanka
