= Senapala Samarasekera =

Sri Lankan politician (1919–1984)

Senapala Samarasekera (10 February 1919 - 2 October 1984) was a Sri Lankan politician.

In the 1940s, Samarasekera took over the responsibility of the family's tea plantation, the Kunduppakanda estate, in the Ruhuna tea production area in southern Sri Lanka near Galle in Angulugaha.

At the 4th parliamentary elections in March 1960, he was elected as a member of Akmeemana, representing the Lanka Prajathanthravadi Pakshaya (Ceylon Democratic Party), securing approximately 48% of the vote. In subsequent parliamentary elections in July 1960, he retained the seat with an increased majority. Towards the end of 1960, during the parliamentary debate on the takeover of denominational schools, Samarasekera switched to the Sri Lanka Freedom Party.

Samarasekera was defeated at the 6th parliamentary elections in 1965 by a narrow margin of just over 1,000 votes. However, he was successful in regaining the seat at the next parliamentary elections in 1970, with almost 60% of the vote. In July 1970, he was appointed Deputy Chairman of Committees a position he retained until July 1976.
