= Akmeemana Electoral District =

Electoral district of Sri Lanka

Akmeemana electoral district was an electoral district of Sri Lanka between March 1960 and February 1989. The district was named after the town of Akmeemana in Galle District, Southern Province. The 1978 Constitution of Sri Lanka introduced the proportional representation electoral system for electing members of Parliament. The existing 160 mainly single-member electoral districts were replaced with 22 multi-member electoral districts. Akmeemana electoral district was replaced by the Galle multi-member electoral district at the 1989 general elections.

== Members of Parliament ==
Key

Independent SLFP UNP Lanka Prajathanthravadi Pakshaya

Election	Member	Party	Term
1960 (March)	Senapala Samarasekera	LPP	1960
1960 (July)	Senapala Samarasekera	LPP	1960-1965
1965	A. D. S. de Silva	UNP	1965-1970
1970	Senapala Samarasekera	SLFP	1970-1977
1977	Sumanadasa Abeywickrama	UNP	1977-1983
1983 parliamentary by-election	Richard Pathirana	SLFP	1983-1989

== Elections ==
=== 1960 (March) Parliamentary General Election ===
Results of the 4th parliamentary election held on 19 March 1960:

Candidate	Party	Symbol	Votes	%
Senapala Samarasekera	Lanka Prajathanthravadi Pakshaya	Umbrella	11,815	47.90
H. W. Amarasuriya	United National Party	Elephant	8,552	34.67
D. Y. Wijayawickrema		Cartwheel	2,635	10.68
C. J. Seneviratne		Star	607	2.46
D. R. Wanigaratne		Key	379	1.54
T. Hettige Dharmadasa		Pot	292	1.18
Bentis Kulasinghe		Window	203	0.82
Valid Votes			24,483	99.27
Rejected Votes			181	0.73
Total Polled			24,664	100.00
Registered Electors			31,384	
Turnout				78.59

=== 1960 (July) Parliamentary General Election ===
Results of the 5th parliamentary election held on 20 July 1960:

Candidate	Party	Symbol	Votes	%
Senapala Samarasekera	Lanka Prajathanthravadi Pakshaya	Umbrella	13,747	57.54
H. W. Amarasuriya	United National Party	Elephant	10,043	42.04
Valid Votes			23,790	99.58
Rejected Votes			101	0.42
Total Polled			23,891	100.00
Registered Electors			31,384	
Turnout				76.13

=== 1965 Parliamentary General Election ===
Results of the 6th parliamentary election held on 22 March 1965:

Candidate	Party	Symbol	Votes	%
A. D. S. de Silva	United National Party	Elephant	15,592	49.58
Senapala Samarasekera	Sri Lanka Freedom Party	Hand	14,336	45.59
Edmund Kalansuriya		Cartwheel	884	2.81
D. A. S. P. Dahanayake		Umbrella	244	0.78
E. D. Nagahawatte		Bird	212	0.67
Valid Votes			31,268	99.43
Rejected Votes			178	0.57
Total Polled			31,446	100.00
Registered Electors			37,541	
Turnout				83.76

=== 1970 Parliamentary General Election ===
Results of the 7th parliamentary election held on 27 May 1970:

Candidate	Party	Symbol	Votes	%
Senapala Samarasekera	Sri Lanka Freedom Party	Hand	21,749	59.27
Sugathadasa Arambawalage	United National Party	Elephant	14,388	39.21
Bentis Kulasinghe		Bell	287	0.78
K. H. Sugathadasa		Eye	188	0.51
Valid Votes			36,612	99.78
Rejected Votes			82	0.22
Total Polled			36,694	100.00
Registered Electors			42,678	
Turnout				85.98

=== 1977 Parliamentary General Election ===
Results of the 8th parliamentary election held on 21 July 1977:

Candidate	Party	Symbol	Votes	%
Sumanadasa Abeywickrema	United National Party	Elephant	21,284	55.72
Senapala Samarasekera	Sri Lanka Freedom Party	Hand	15,170	39.71
Amarasiri Dodangoda		Star	1,235	3.23
Edward Atukorala		Rabbit	223	0.58
N. D. Kalansuriya		Lamp	129	0.34
S. Samarasekera		Clock	54	0.14
Valid Votes			38,095	99.73
Rejected Votes			104	0.27
Total Polled			38,199	100.00
Registered Electors			43,343	
Turnout				88.13

=== 1983 Parliamentary By-Election ===
Following the resignation of the sitting member, Sumanadasa Abeywickrema, on 10 February 1983, a parliamentary by-election for the seat was held on 18 May 1983. The results of which were:

Candidate	Party	Symbol	Votes	%
Richard Pathirana	Sri Lanka Freedom Party	Hand	19,820	51.60
Sumanadasa Abeywickrama	United National Party	Elephant	17,042	44.37
Premalal Abeysekera		Scales	754	1.96
Sirisena Nanayakkara		Bird	302	0.79
Wanniarachchi Kankanamge Piyadasa		Chair	274	0.71
Siripala Samararatne Vidana Arachchige		Mortar	57	0.15
Valid Votes			38,249	99.57
Rejected Votes			164	0.43
Total Polled			38,413	100.00
Registered Electors			43,343	
Turnout				88.63
