= 1987 grenade attack in the Sri Lankan Parliament =

Terrorist incident in Sri Lanka

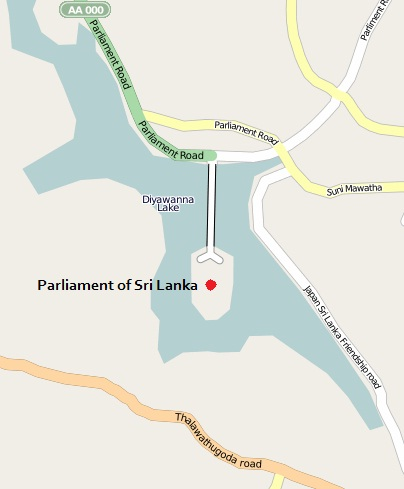
- The location of the Parliament of Sri Lanka, which is situated on an island in the Diyawanna Oya
- Location: 6.887174°N 79.918646°E; Parliament of Sri Lanka, Sri Jayawardenepura
- Date: 18 August 1987; 9:00am (UTC+5.50)
- Attack type: Grenade attack
- Deaths: 2
- Injuries: 16
- Perpetrator: Deshapremi Janatha Viyaparaya

The 1987 grenade attack in the Sri Lankan Parliament is an attack that took place on 18 August 1987, when an assailant hurled two grenades into a room where the Sri Lankan president, prime minister and Members of Parliament were meeting. The grenades bounced off the table at which president J. R. Jayawardene and prime minister Ranasinghe Premadasa were sitting, and rolled away. A member of parliament and a ministry secretary were killed by the explosions.

A subsequent police investigation concluded that the grenades had been thrown by a member of the banned Janatha Vimukthi Peramuna (JVP) organisation, which was staging a rebellion in the country at the time. Five members of the JVP were eventually put on trial for the attack, but were acquitted due to lack of evidence. It is believed the attack targeted Jayawardene for his signing the Indo-Sri Lanka Accord a few weeks earlier. The initial responsibility for the attack was claimed by an organisation named Patriotic People's Movement better known as the DJV.

== Background ==
Beginning in 1983, Tamil militants began a war of insurrection with the objective of establishing an independent Tamil nation in the north and east of Sri Lanka. 6,000 people had died as a result of the conflict by 1987. In May 1987, the Sri Lanka Army launched a major offensive to defeat the Tamil rebels; the operation was a success, and the rebels were cornered in a small part of the Jaffna Peninsula. Sri Lankan military commanders believed that they would be able to totally defeat the militants within a few weeks. However, the Indian government became increasingly involved in the conflict, because southern India was the home of 50 million Tamils. As the Sri Lankan army was closing in on the rebels, India Prime Minister Rajiv Gandhi ordered an airdrop of materials to the besieged rebels, which Sri Lankan president J. R. Jayawardene termed a “naked act of aggression” by India.

Faced with the prospect of Indian military involvement to support the militants, Sri Lankan President J. R. Jayawardene was pressured into signing the Indo-Sri Lanka Accord on 29 July 1987. It called for Tamil rebels to lay down their arms, in exchange for limited autonomy in the north and east of Sri Lanka. Jayawardene also agreed to have India send troops to Sri Lanka to enforce the accord. The accord proved highly unpopular amongst both the Sinhalese groups and the Tamil groups in the country, who saw it as a sellout to India, and the Indian troops as an expansionist force.

As Rajiv Gandhi was leaving Sri Lanka following the signing of the accord, a member of the honour guard stuck him in the head with a rifle butt. Gandhi was not hurt in the incident. The guard was later found to be a member of the outlawed Janatha Vimukthi Peramuna, a far-left organisation that was staging a rebellion in mostly south of the country, still there were also members in the north.

The JVP secondly attacked a government-broadcasting centre and stole a radio set.

== Grenade attack ==
The first session of Parliament after the signing of the Indo-Sri Lanka Accord was due to be held on 18 August 1987. Before the convening of Parliament, the bi-weekly Government Parliamentary Group meeting was held in Committee Room A of the Parliament Complex. Approximately 120 legislators were at the meeting, which started at 8:40am. The group initially observed two minutes of silence in memory of Jinadasa Weerasinghe, the Member of Parliament for Tangalle, who had been assassinated a few days earlier by the JVP. As MP A. D. B. Ekanayake was speaking to the group, an assailant in the adjoining room hurled two grenades at the head table where the President J. R. Jayawardene and Prime Minister Ranasinghe Premadasa were sitting. The grenades bounced off the table, and rolled close to the table where National Security Advisor Lalith Athulathmudali and Matara District Minister Keerthisena Abeywickrama were seated, and exploded in front of them.

According to a government press officer who was at the meeting, pandemonium reigned following the explosions. He said some legislators thought Parliament was under attack. Using wooden chairs, they broke the thin plate glass overlooking the Parliament lawn to escape the room, and were immediately bundled into cars and driven away.

Member of Parliament for the Matara District Keerthisena Abeywickrama, whose face was blown off due to the explosion, was carried outside and rushed to hospital, but died on the way there. Norbert Senadeera, an official with the Parliament staff, died later of a shrapnel wound to the head. Sixteen others were injured in the attack, including National Security Advisor Lalith Athulathmudali, Prime Minister Premadasa and Ministers Gamini Jayasuriya, Montague Jayawickrama, and E. L. B. Hurulle. President J. R. Jayewardene escaped injury.

Although initial reports indicated that gunfire had preceded the attack, no shots were fired during the incident.

== Aftermath of attack ==
In the immediate aftermath of the attack, Sri Lankan President J. R. Jayewardene blamed "terrorists" among the Sinhalese population for the incident. He also appealed for calm in the country, and called the attack an "attempt to destroy the parliamentary democratic system of the country".

A day after the attack, the BBC reported that the Deshapremi Janatha Viyaparaya (DJV), which would later be identified as the military wing of the Janatha Vimukthi Peramuna, claimed responsibility. They also distributed leaflets in Colombo, calling on "patriotic people in the armed forces" to resist "Indian expansionism", and calling President Jayewardene "a traitor whose death would be welcome". They also told the BBC they were seeking revenge for Jayewardene's "betrayal of Sinhalese interests in granting greater political autonomy to ethnic Tamil areas".

== Investigation ==
Although the Police sealed off the Parliament building following the attack, initial reports stated that the assailant fled in the panic that followed the explosions. No arrests were made immediately following the attack.

Subsequent investigations suggested that Ajith Kumara, an activist of the Janatha Vimukthi Peramuna who was working for a private catering service inside parliament, had thrown the grenades into the committee room. He was friendly with most of those working in the complex and had access to the room from where the bombs were flung. Kumara disappeared immediately after the incident. A Million LKR ($35,000) bounty was placed on his head, but he evaded arrest for several months. He was however subsequently arrested on April 8, 1988, when he tried to flee from police who were conducting an unrelated search for illegal liquor in Naula. The Police did not realise who he was until they conducted further investigations.

== Trial ==
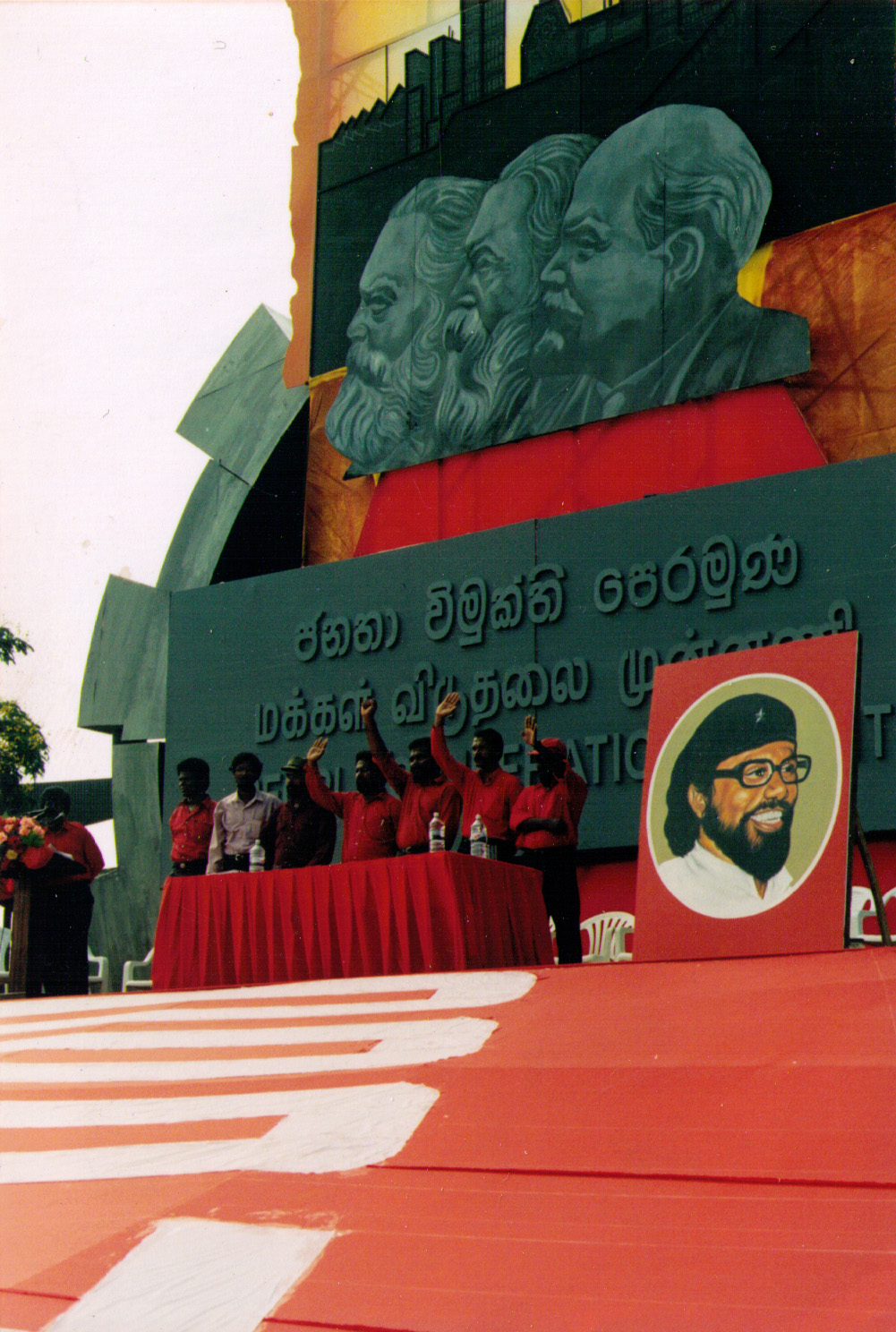
After their insurrection was crushed in 1989, the JVP was decriminalised, and they entered mainstream politics in the 1990s

After his arrest, Ajith Kumara, along with four others, were charged with carrying out the grenade attack. They were indicted on ten counts, including conspiracy to commit the murder of President J. R. Jayawardene; and attempting to commit the murder of Lalith Athulathmudali. In court, State Counsel Palitha Fernando claimed Kumara was a member of the Janatha Vimukthi Peramuna (JVP), which was a banned organization at the time, and that the JVP ordered the attack as a result of President Jayawardene’s decision to deploy the Indian Army in the north and east of Sri Lanka. Kumara held in the maximum security Welikada Prison throughout his trial.

On 12 October 1990, the Colombo High Court at Bar delivered a unanimous verdict acquitting Kumara, the first accused, and M. Jayasiri Gunawardena, the fifth accused, due to lack of evidence. Delivering the verdict, High court judge Ananda Grero said the prosecution had not proved the charges beyond a reasonable doubt. The three other suspects had previously been acquitted on 4 October. During the trails, the defendants were represented by future Minister Susil Premajayantha and diplomat Mangala Moonesinghe.

Ajith Kumara was ultimately released on 6 August 1993. He entered politics afterwards, becoming an active member of the JVP, which had since been decriminalised. He later became a JVP politbureau member, Pradeshiya Sabha member and unsuccessful Chief Ministerial candidate of the JVP for the 1999 Sabaragamuva Provincial Council elections.

== Sources ==
- Weisman, Steven R. (1987a). "Stunned Sri Lanka Studies Parliament Attack". New York Times.
- Weisman, Steven R. (1987b). "India's Aid To Tamils Is 'Aggression' To Sri Lanka". New York Times.
- Pfaffenburger, B. (1988). "Sri Lanka in 1987: Indian Intervention and Resurgence of the JVP". Asian Survey. 28 (2): 137–147. doi:10.2307/2644815. JSTOR 2644815.
- Guneratne, Rohan (1990). Sri Lanka, a Lost Revolution?: The Inside Story of the JVP. Institute of Fundamental Studies. ISBN 9552600049.
