= Sumanapala Dahanayake =

Sri Lankan politician

Wijesekara Sumanapala Dahanayake (born 4 February 1929, date of death unknown) was a Sri Lankan politician who was the member of the Parliament of Sri Lanka representing the Deniyaya electorate. He was a member of the Lanka Sama Samaja Party (LSSP).

Dahanayake contested the March 1960 general election from the Sri Lanka Freedom Party from Deniyaya, but came third. He was successful in the July 1960 general election and was elected to parliament. He was again elected to parliament in the 1970 general election. He was the President of the Morawaka Cooperative Union, which manufactured crayons under the brand CoopCrayon during the 1970s. He was wounded in April 1971, during the 1971 JVP insurrection when he and Major Wettasinghe attempted to lead an army expedition into rebel held areas outside Matara. His son Wijaya was also elected to parliament, representing Matara and served as Deputy Minister of Public Administration and Home Affairs. Dahanayake is deceased.
