= List of Sri Lankan politicians =

The following is a list of Sri Lankan politicians.
