= Deniyaya =

- Town
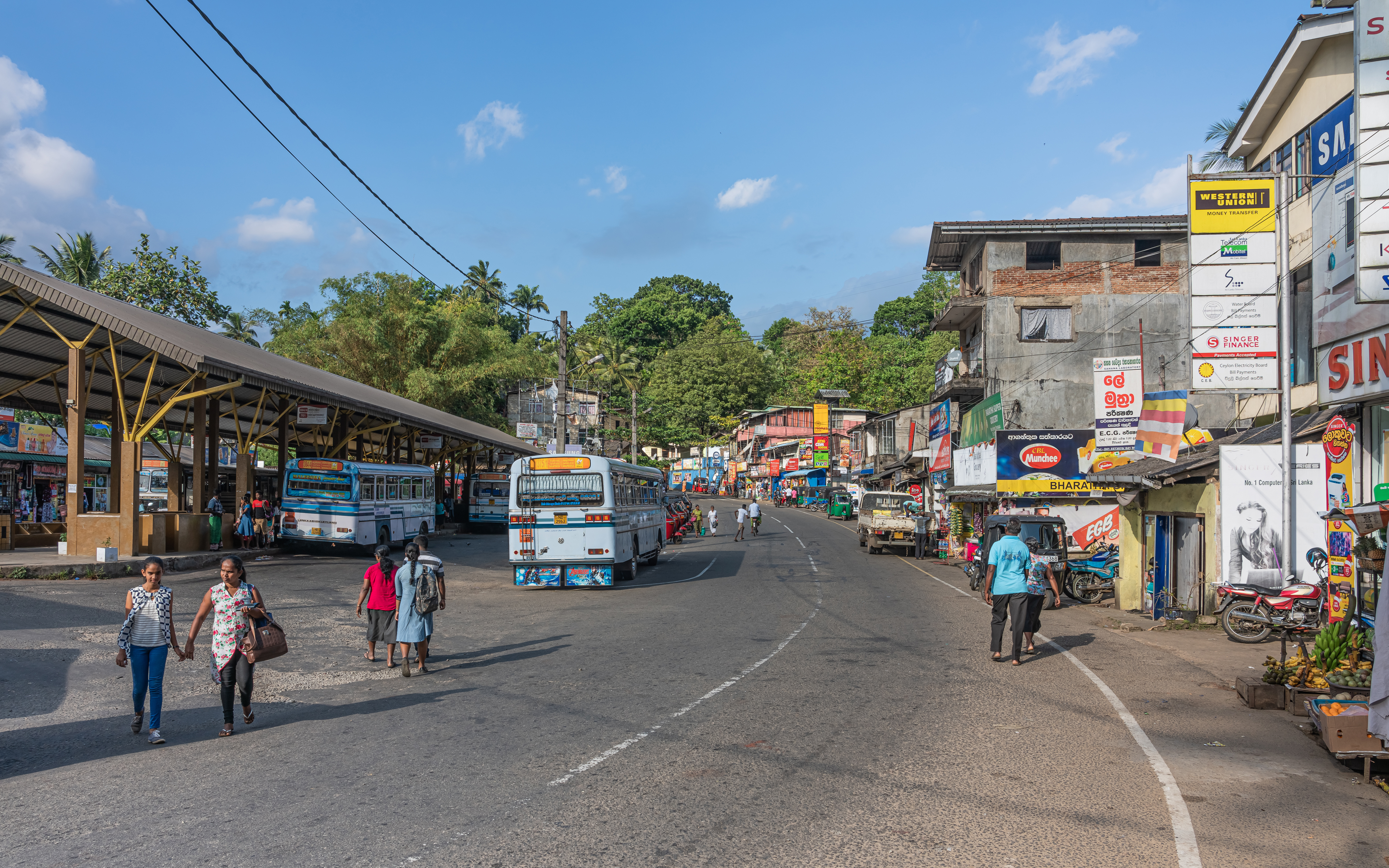
- Deniyaya bus station

- Location in Sri Lanka
- Coordinates: 6°20′40″N 80°33′30″E
- Country: Sri Lanka
- Province: Southern Province
- District: Matara District
- Elevation: 450 m (1,480 ft)

Population
  - Estimate (2023): 15,000
- Time zone: UTC+5:30 (Sri Lanka Standard Time)

Deniyaya is a small town located towards the south of Sri Lanka. It is located in Matara District of the Southern Province. It is surrounded by the Sinharaja rainforest, and the climate is relatively cool. The main source of income is tea cultivation, however people also engage in vegetable cultivation. The village also has many historic temples such as the Gatabaruwa Devalaya. As of 2023, it has an estimated population of 15,000.

== History ==
The town of Deniyaya was founded along the Gin River in 1904 to serve neighbouring tea estates.

As part of the 1971 JVP insurrection, the police station in Deniyaya was captured by JVP insurgents on the 5th of April, 1971. The police withdrew and surrendered the station to the JVP, and the station was burned down later that month.

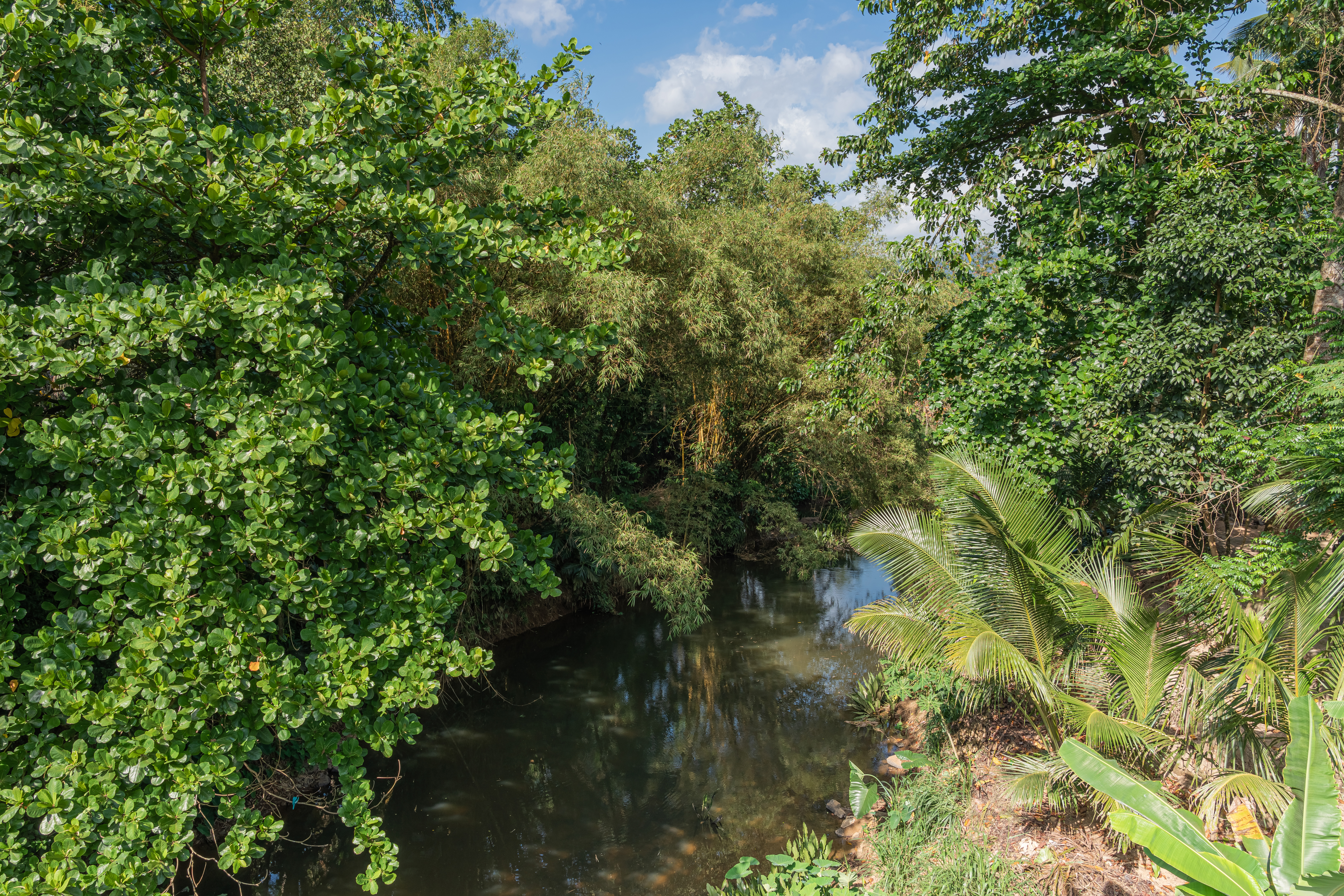
Gin River in Deniyaya, Sri Lanka

Following the introduction of proportional representation in the 1978 Constitution of Sri Lanka, the Deniyaya Electoral District was replaced by the Matara Electoral District at the 1989 Sri Lankan parliamentary election. Within the Matara Electoral District, Deniyaya is part of the Deniyaya Polling Division.

== Industry ==
The largest industry in Deniyaya is tea cultivation. The Tea Research Institute of Sri Lanka established The Deniyaya Extension Centre in 1981 which covers 29,500 hectares of tea.

Tourism is also a part of Deniyaya's economy. The town is a popular 'base' for tourists exploring the nearby UNESCO World Heritage Site of the Sinharaja Forest Reserve.

== Transportation ==
Long-distance bus services run four times daily from Ratnapura to Deniyaya and thrice daily to and from Galle. About two busses an hour also run from Matara to Deniyaya, through the town of Akuressa.

== See also ==
- List of towns in Southern Province, Sri Lanka
