= Eastern Province, Sri Lanka =

Province in Sri Lanka

Eastern Province கிழக்கு மாகாணம் නැගෙනහිර පළාත
- Province
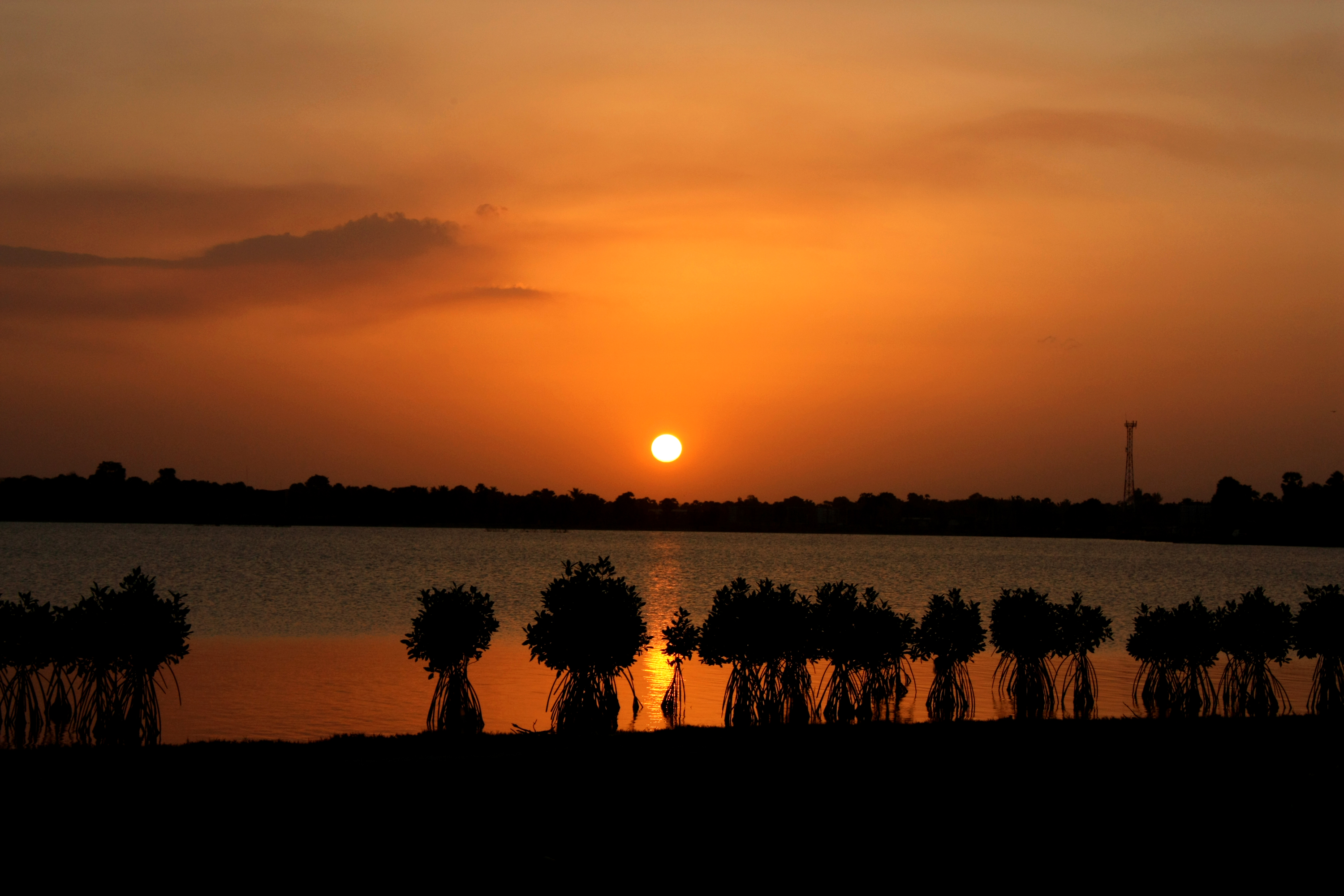
- Sunset over Batticaloa Lagoon

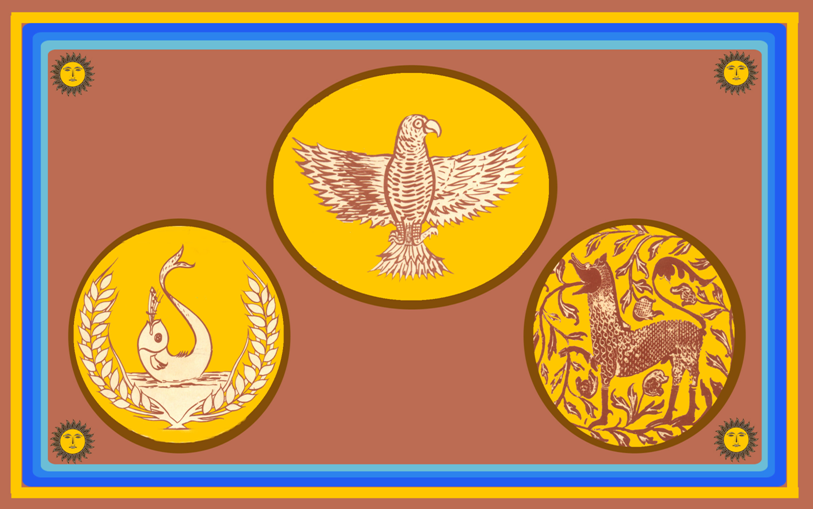
- Flag

- Location within Sri Lanka
- Coordinates: 07°55′N 81°30′E
- Country: Sri Lanka
- Created: 1 October 1833
- Provincial council: 14 November 1987
- Capital: Trincomalee
- Largest City: Kalmunai
- Cities & Towns: List: * Batticaloa; * Ampara; * Kattankudy; * Eravur; * Akkaraipattu; * Pottuvil; * Sammanthurai
- Districts: List: Ampara; Batticaloa; Trincomalee

Government
  - Type: Provincial council
  - Body: Eastern Provincial Council
  - Governor: Jayantha Lal Ratnasekera
  - MPs: List: Roshan Akmeemana; Wasantha Piyathissa; Muthumenike Rathwatte; P. Dayaratna; Cassim Faizal; M. K. A. S. Gunawardena; H. M. M. Harees; M. L. A. M. Hisbullah; Podiappuhamy Piyasena; Arun Hemachandra; R. Sampanthan; Basheer Segu Dawood; P. Selvarasa; M. S. Thowfeek; Imran Maharoof; Sriyani Wijewickrama; S. Yogeswaran

Area
  - Total: 9,996 km^{2} (3,859 sq mi)
  - Land: 9,361 km^{2} (3,614 sq mi)
  - Water: 635 km^{2} (245 sq mi) 6.35%
  - Rank: 2nd (15.24% of total area)

Population (2024 census)
  - Total: 1,783,214
  - Rank: 6th (7.66% of total pop.)
  - Density: 190.5/km^{2} (493.4/sq mi)

Ethnicity (2024 census)
  - Sri Lankan Tamil: 678,549 (38.05%)
  - Sri Lankan Moors: 703,561 (39.45%)
  - Sinhalese: 392,114 (21.99%)
  - Indian Tamil: 2,421 (0.14%)
  - Other: 5,768 (0.41%)

Religion (2024 census)
  - Muslim: 707,054 (39.65%)
  - Hindu: 597,472 (33.50%)
  - Buddhist: 389,119 (21.82%)
  - Christian: 89,435 (5.02%)
  - Other: 134 (0.01%)
- Time zone: UTC+05:30 (Sri Lanka)
- Post Codes: 30000-32999
- Telephone Codes: 026, 063, 065, 067
- ISO 3166 code: LK-5
- Vehicle registration: EP
- Official Languages: Tamil, Sinhalese
- Website: www.ep.gov.lk

The Eastern Province (Tamil: கிழக்கு மாகாணம், romanized: Kiḻakku Mākāṇam; Sinhala: නැගෙනහිර පළාත, romanized: Næ̆gĕnahira Paḷāta) is one of the nine provinces of Sri Lanka, the first level administrative division of the country. The provinces have existed since the 19th century but did not have any legal status until 1987 when the 13th Amendment to the Constitution of Sri Lanka established provincial councils. Between 1988 and 2006 the province was temporarily merged with the Northern Province to form the North Eastern Province. The capital of the province is Trincomalee. Kalmunai is the largest and most populous city of Eastern Province.

== History ==
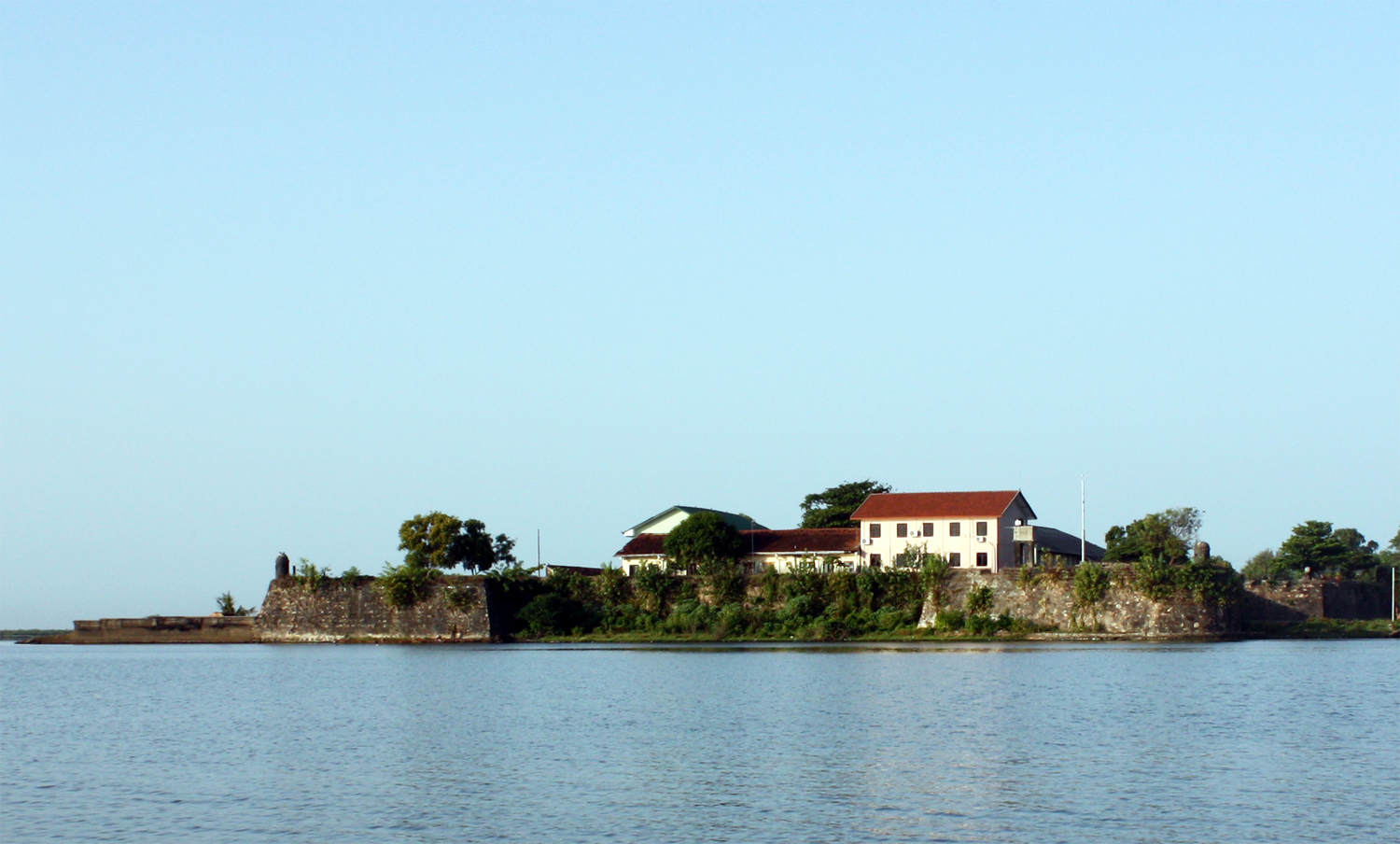
Batticaloa Fort, built by the Portuguese in 1628

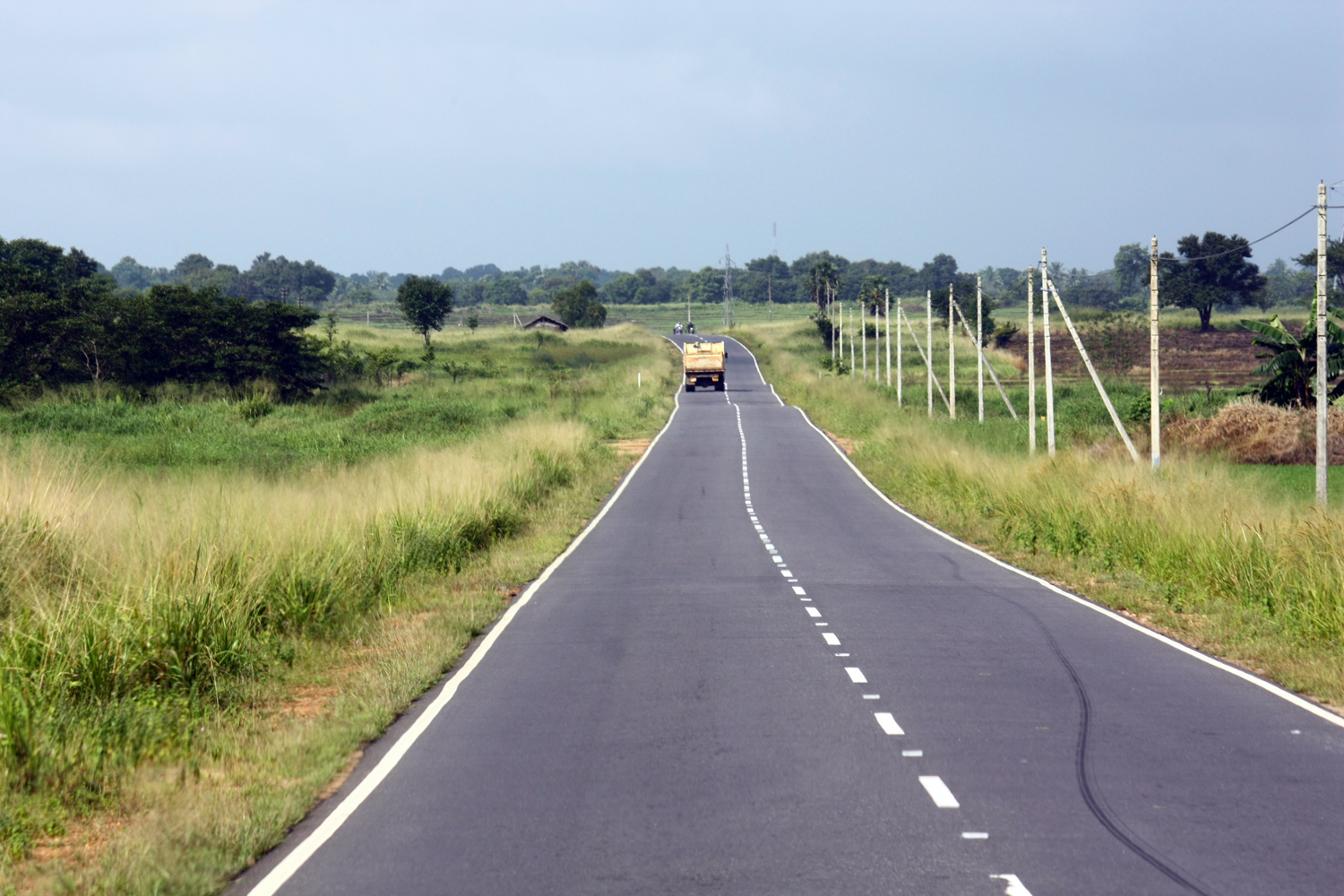
Batticaloa-Polonnaruwa Road

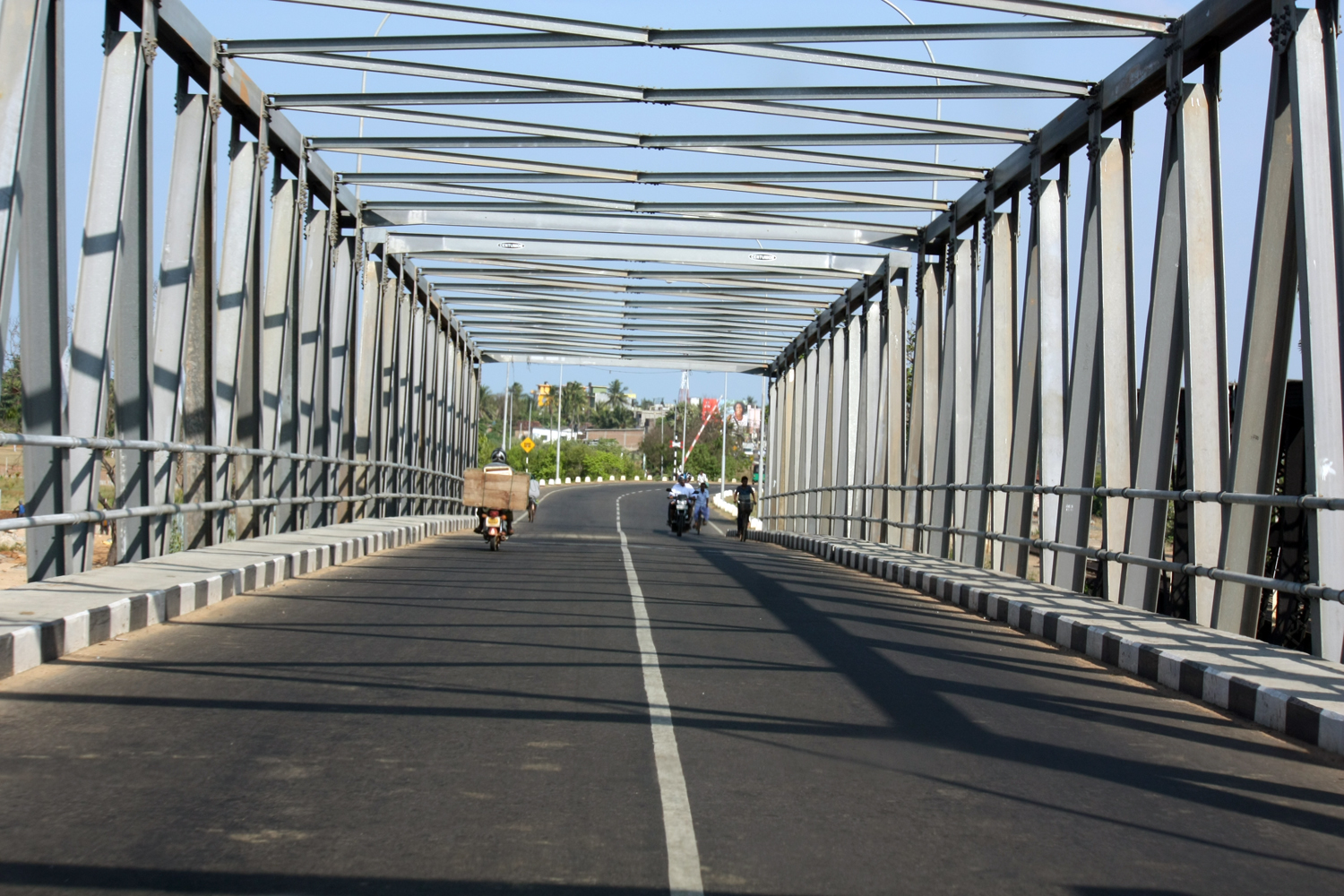
New Oddamavadi Bridge

In 1815 the British gained control of the entire island of Ceylon. They divided the island into three administrative structures based on ethnicity: Low Country Sinhalese, Kandyan Sinhalese and Tamil. The Eastern Province was part of the Tamil administration. In 1833, in accordance with the recommendations of the Colebrooke-Cameron Commission, these three administrative structures were unified into a single administration divided into five geographic provinces. The districts of Batticaloa, Bintenna (part of present-day Badulla District), Tamankaduva (present day Polonnaruwa District) and Trincomalee formed the new Eastern Province. Tamankaduva was transferred to the newly created North Central Province in 1873 and Bintenna was transferred to the newly created Uva Province in 1886.

The Indo-Lanka Accord signed on 29 July 1987 required the Sri Lankan government to devolve powers to the provinces and, in the interim, to merge the Northern and Eastern provinces into one administrative unit. The accord required a referendum to be held by 31 December 1988 in the Eastern Province to decide whether the merger should be permanent. Crucially, the accord allowed the Sri Lankan president to postpone the referendum at his discretion.

On 14 November 1987 the Sri Lankan Parliament passed the 13th Amendment to the 1978 Constitution of Sri Lanka and the Provincial Councils Act No 42 of 1987, establishing provincial councils. On September 2 and 8 1988 President Jayewardene issued proclamations enabling the Northern and Eastern provinces to be one administrative unit administered by one elected Council. The North-East Province was born.

The proclamations were only meant to be a temporary measure until a referendum was held in the Eastern Province on a permanent merger between the two provinces. However, the referendum was never held and successive Sri Lankan presidents issued proclamations annually extending the life of the "temporary" entity.

The merger was bitterly opposed by Sri Lankan nationalists. The combined North-East Province occupied one fourth of Sri Lanka. The thought of the rebel Liberation Tigers of Tamil Eelam (LTTE) controlling this province, directly or indirectly, alarmed them greatly. On 14 July 2006, after a long campaign against the merger, the Janatha Vimukthi Peramuna political party filed three separate petitions with the Supreme Court requesting a separate provincial council for the East. On 16 October 2006 the Supreme Court ruled that the proclamations issued by President Jayewardene were null and void and had no legal effect. The North-East Province was formally de-merged into the Northern and Eastern provinces on 1 January 2007.

Much of the Eastern Province was under the control of rebel LTTE for many years during the civil war. The entire province was recaptured by the Sri Lankan military in 2007. Many community members blamed Pro-Government Tamil groups such as the Tamil Makkal Viduthalai Pulikal (TMVP) for this. In 2008 due to "indiscriminate firearm use" by various Tamil factions, the government planned to disarm Tamil Paramilitary groups. However, due to the threat of the LTTE, the TMVP were allowed to keep their weapons. The TMVP was finally disarmed in 2009 after the LTTE was defeated.

The Eastern Province received at least US$500 million from international donors between 2007 and 2009, according to the International Crisis Group. Since the end of the war the Eastern Province has seen considerable development under the Nagenahira Navodaya (Eastern Revival) program which includes various agricultural, infrastructural and social development projects. These include the construction and repairing of roads, schools, hospitals, resettlement of IDPs and construction of 88 Nanasala ICT education centers in the province. Other projects include reconstructing the Walai Iravu bridge which was destroyed by the LTTE, developing the Weber Stadium in Batticaloa, increasing agricultural production, construction of the Manmunai, Vavunativu and New Oddamavadi bridges, constructing 48,000 houses for people who live below the poverty line, developing the Trincomalee Harbour, construction of the Sampur Power Station, development of a maritime park and museum in Trincomalee, creation of the Sampur industrial zone, development of bus infrastructure, canals and the Oluvil Harbour in Ampara district.

== Geography ==
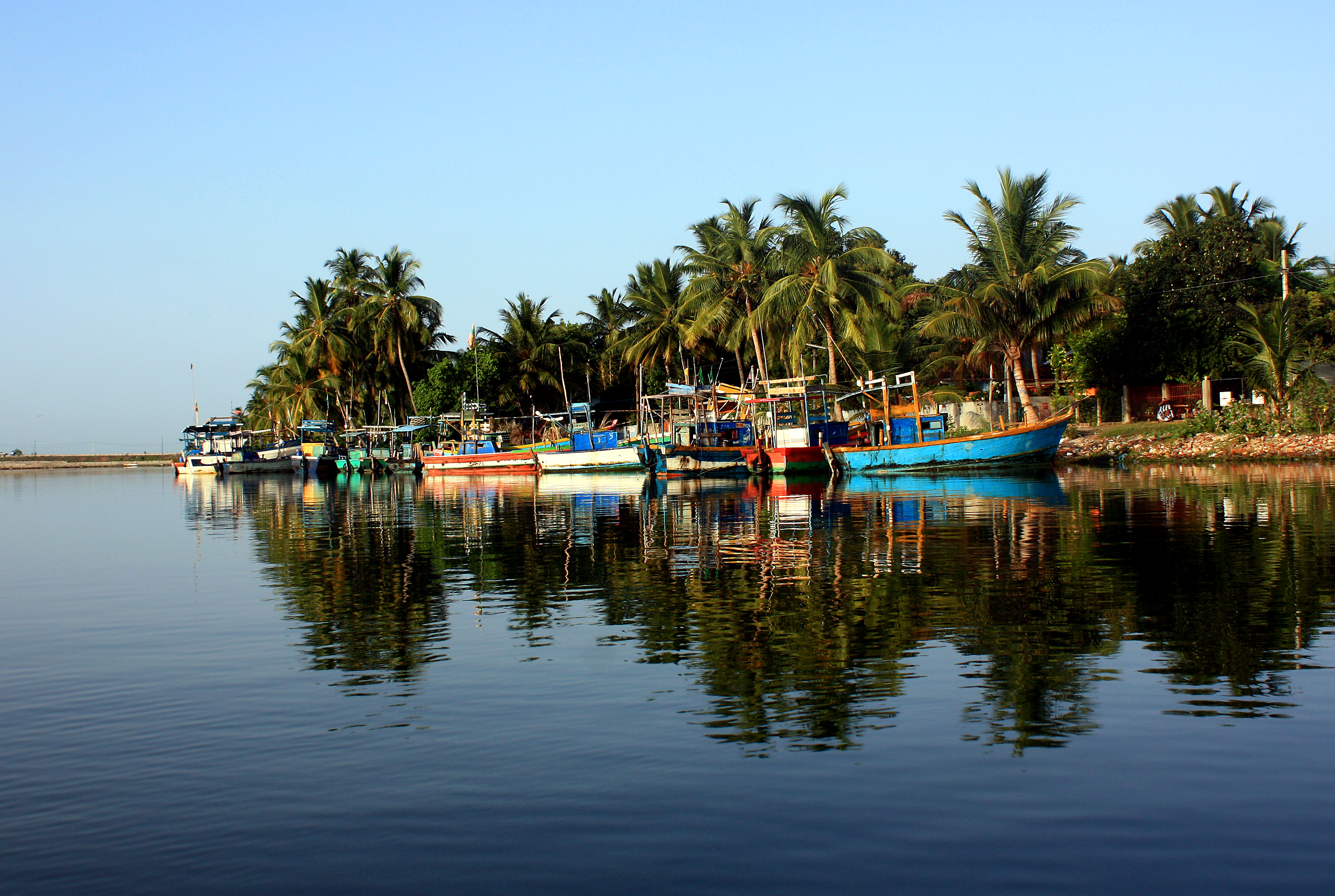
Fishing boats on Batticaloa lagoon

Eastern province has an area of 9,996 square kilometres (3,859 sq mi).

The province is surrounded by the Northern Province to the north, the Bay of Bengal to the east, the Southern Province to the south, and the Uva, Central and North Central provinces to the west.

The province's coast is dominated by lagoons, the largest being Batticaloa Lagoon, Kokkilai lagoon, Upaar Lagoon and Ullackalie Lagoon.

== Administrative units, cities and towns ==
=== Administrative units ===
The Eastern Province is divided into 3 administrative districts, 45 Divisional Secretary's Divisions (DS Divisions) and 1,085 Grama Niladhari Divisions (GN Divisions).

District	Capital	District Secretary	DS Divisions	GN Divisions	Total Area (km^{2})	Land Area (km^{2})	Population (2024 Census)						Population Density (/km^{2})
District	Capital	District Secretary	DS Divisions	GN Divisions	Total Area (km^{2})	Land Area (km^{2})	Sri Lankan Tamil	Sri Lankan Moors	Sinhalese	Indian Tamil	Other	Total	Population Density (/km^{2})
Ampara	Ampara	Thusitha P Wanigasinghe	20	507	4,415	4,222	125,751	339,290	276,583	664	2,927	744,551	169
Batticaloa	Batticaloa		14	348	2,854	2,610	424,710	160,284	6,855	992	3,077	595,918	209
Trincomalee	Trincomalee	T. Thissa Ranjith de Silva	11	230	2,727	2,529	128,088	203,987	108,676	765	2,927	442,745	162
Total			45	1,085	9,996	9,361	678,549	703,561	392,114	2,421	7,233	1,783,214	178

=== Major cities and towns ===
City/town	District	Population (2012 est)
Kalmunai	Ampara	106,783
Trincomalee	Trincomalee	99,135
Batticaloa	Batticaloa	92,332
Kattankudy	Batticaloa	40,883
Eravur	Batticaloa	25,582
Ampara	Ampara	20,309

== Demographics ==
=== Population ===
The Eastern province's population was 1,783,214 in 2024. The province is the most diverse in Sri Lanka, both ethnically and religiously.

The population of the province, like that of the Northern Province, was heavily affected by the civil war. The war killed an estimated 100,000 people. Several hundred thousand Sri Lankan Tamils, possibly as much as one million, emigrated to the West during the war. Many Sri Lankan Tamils also moved to the relative safety of the capital Colombo. The conflict has also caused some of the Tamils, Moors and Sinhalese who lived in the province to flee to other parts of Sri Lanka, though most of them have returned to the province since the end of the civil war.

=== Ethnicity ===
Population of Eastern Province by ethnic group 1881 to 2024
Year	Tamil (Note: Sri Lankan Tamil and Indian Tamil.)		Muslim (Note: Sri Lankan Moors and Sri Lankan Malays.)		Sinhalese		Other		Total No.
Year	No.	%	No.	%	No.	%	No.	%	Total No.
1881 Census	75,318	58.96%	43,001	33.66%	5,947	4.66%	3,489	2.73%	127,755
1891 Census	86,701	58.41%	51,206	34.50%	7,508	5.06%	3,029	2.04%	148,444
1901 Census	96,917	55.83%	62,448	35.97%	8,778	5.06%	5,459	3.14%	173,602
1911 Census	101,181	55.08%	70,395	38.32%	6,909	3.76%	5,213	2.84%	183,698
1921 Census	103,245	53.54%	75,992	39.41%	8,744	4.53%	4,840	2.51%	192,821
1946 Census	136,059	48.75%	109,024	39.06%	23,456	8.40%	10,573	3.79%	279,112
1953 Census	167,898	47.37%	135,322	38.18%	46,470	13.11%	4,720	1.33%	354,410
1963 Census	246,059	45.03%	184,434	33.75%	108,636	19.88%	7,345	1.34%	546,474
1971 Census	315,566	43.98%	247,178	34.45%	148,572	20.70%	6,255	0.87%	717,571
1981 Census	410,156	42.06%	315,436	32.34%	243,701	24.99%	5,988	0.61%	975,251
2001 Census (Note: 2001 Census was only carried out partially in the Eastern province.)	n/a	n/a	n/a	n/a	n/a	n/a	n/a	n/a	n/a
2007 Enumeration	590,132	40.39%	549,857	37.64%	316,101	21.64%	4,849	0.33%	1,460,939
2012 Census	617,295	39.79%	569,738	36.72%	359,136	23.15%	5,212	0.34%	1,551,381
2024 Census	680,970	38.19%	703,561	39.45%	392,114	21.99%	6569	0.37%	1,783,214

=== Religion ===
Islam is the plurality religion in Eastern Province.

Population of Eastern Province by religion 1981 to 2024
Year	Muslim		Hindu		Buddhist		Christian (Note: Roman Catholic and Other Christian.)		Other		Total No.
Year	No.	%	No.	%	No.	%	No.	%	No.	%	Total No.
1981 Census	317,354	32.54%	372,464	38.19%	237,416	24.34%	47,112	4.83%	905	0.09%	975,251
2012 Census	575,936	37.12%	539,570	34.78%	354,772	22.87%	80,801	5.21%	302	0.02%	1,551,381
2024 Census	707,054	39.65%	597,472	33.51%	389,119	21.82%	89,435	5.02%	134	0.01%	1,783,214

== Economy ==
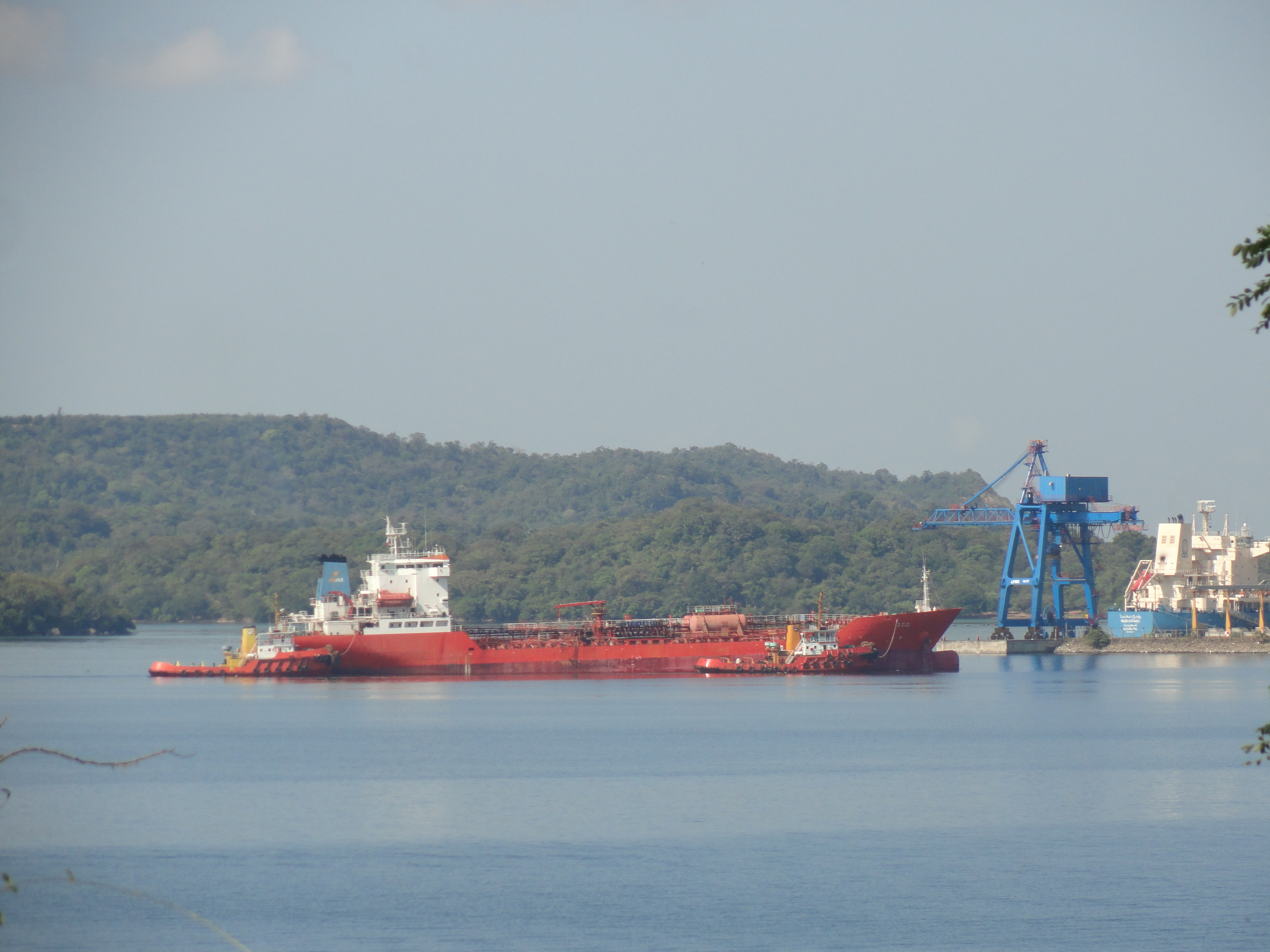
Trincomalee Harbour plays a huge role in the province's economy

The Eastern Province has a primarily agriculture-based economy and is commonly known as the "Granary of Sri Lanka". It contributes 25% of national paddy production, 17% of national milk production, and 21% of national fish production. Maize cultivation is expanding, large scale maize cultivation with hybrid seeds and contractual marketing has increased production significantly and it is targeted to produce 25% of the country's maize requirement. The industrial sector contributed 34% of the Province's GDP and export processing zones like the Trincomalee EPZ and Sampur Heavy Industrial Zone have been developed to boost the industrial sector alongside the Trincomalee Harbour, which is being developed for break bulk, bulk cargo and industrial activities including heavy industries.

The province benefits from a large tourism industry with many seaside resorts and hotels situated mainly in lagoons as well as beaches such as Pasikudah, Nilaveli, Uppuveli and Kalkudah. Historic sites and other natural attractions such as Pigeon Island contribute to the industry.

== Government and politics ==
=== Provincial council ===
The 13th Amendment to the 1978 Constitution of Sri Lanka established provincial councils. The first elections for provincial councils took place on 28 April 1988 in North Central, North Western, Sabaragamuwa, and Uva provinces.

Elections in the newly merged North-East Province were scheduled for 19 November 1988. However, the Indian Peace Keeping Force (IPKF), which at that time occupied the North-East Province, rigged the elections in the north so that the Eelam People's Revolutionary Liberation Front (EPRLF) and Eelam National Democratic Liberation Front (ENDLF), two Indian backed paramilitary groups, won all of the 36 seats in the north uncontested. However, elections did take place for the 35 seats in the east. The Sri Lanka Muslim Congress won 17 seats, EPRLF 12 seats, ENDLF 5 seats and the United National Party 1 seat. On 10 December 1988 Annamalai Varatharajah Perumal of the EPRLF became the first Chief Minister of the North-East Provincial Council.

On 1 March 1990, just as the IPKF were preparing to withdraw from Sri Lanka, Permual moved a motion in the North-East Provincial Council declaring an independent Eelam. President Premadasa reacted to Permual's UDI by dissolving the provincial council and imposing direct rule on the province.

The north-east was ruled directly from Colombo until May 2008 when elections were held in the demerged Eastern Province (the Northern Province continued to be governed from Colombo).

== See also ==
- List of settlements in Eastern Province (Sri Lanka)
- Provinces of Sri Lanka
- Districts of Sri Lanka
