= Trincomalee Polling Division =

Polling division in Sri Lanka

Trincomalee
- Polling Division
- Coordinates: 8.746024°N 81.101654°E
- Country: Sri Lanka
- Province: Eastern Province, Sri Lanka
- Electoral District: Trincomalee Electoral District

Area
  - Total: 537.46 km^{2} (207.51 sq mi)

Population (2012)
  - Total: 130,705
  - Density: 243/km^{2} (630/sq mi)
- ISO 3166 code: EC-14B

The Trincomalee Polling Division is a Polling Division in the Trincomalee Electoral District, in the Eastern Province, Sri Lanka.

== Presidential Election Results ==
=== Summary ===
The winner of Trincomalee has matched the final country result 3 out of 8 times.

Year	Trincomalee	Trincomalee Electoral District	MAE %	Sri Lanka	MAE %
2019	NDF	NDF	5.62%	SLPP	33.27%
2015	NDF	NDF	7.22%	NDF	27.77%
2010	NDF	NDF	15.22%	UPFA	29.65%
2005	UNP	UNP	16.29%	UPFA	29.27%
1999	UNP	UNP	13.02%	PA	19.27%
1994	PA	PA	13.63%	PA	23.24%
1988	SLMP	UNP	11.77%	UNP	17.13%
1982	UNP	UNP	8.27%	UNP	8.41%
Matches/Mean MAE	3/8	4/8	11.38%	8/8	23.50%

=== 2019 Sri Lankan Presidential Election ===
Party	Trincomalee		Trincomalee Electoral District		Sri Lanka	
Party	Votes	%	Votes	%	Votes	%
NDF	56,594	78.02%	166,841	72.10%	5,564,239	41.99%
SLPP	12,818	17.67%	54,135	23.39%	6,924,255	52.25%
Other Parties (with < 1%)	3,125	4.31%	10,434	4.51%	764,005	5.76%
Valid Votes	72,537	98.96%	231,410	99.21%	13,252,499	98.99%
Rejected Votes	762	1.04%	1,832	0.79%	135,452	1.01%
Total Polled	73,299	80.65%	233,242	82.97%	13,387,951	83.71%
Registered Electors	90,881		281,114		15,992,568	

=== 2015 Sri Lankan Presidential Election ===
Party	Trincomalee		Trincomalee Electoral District		Sri Lanka	
Party	Votes	%	Votes	%	Votes	%
NDF	49,650	79.11%	140,338	71.84%	6,217,162	51.28%
UPFA	12,056	19.21%	52,111	26.67%	5,768,090	47.58%
Other Parties (with < 1%)	1,053	1.68%	2,907	1.49%	138,200	1.14%
Valid Votes	62,759	98.72%	195,356	99.08%	12,123,452	98.85%
Rejected Votes	816	1.28%	1,805	0.92%	140,925	1.15%
Total Polled	63,575	73.09%	197,161	72.50%	12,264,377	78.69%
Registered Electors	86,978		271,953		15,585,942	

=== 2010 Sri Lankan Presidential Election ===
Party	Trincomalee		Trincomalee Electoral District		Sri Lanka	
Party	Votes	%	Votes	%	Votes	%
NDF	35,887	69.42%	87,661	54.09%	4,173,185	40.15%
UPFA	13,935	26.95%	69,752	43.04%	6,015,934	57.88%
Other Parties (with < 1%)	1,876	3.63%	4,659	2.87%	204,494	1.97%
Valid Votes	51,698	98.01%	162,072	98.52%	10,393,613	99.03%
Rejected Votes	1,050	1.99%	2,432	1.48%	101,838	0.97%
Total Polled	52,748	60.85%	164,504	34.10%	10,495,451	66.70%
Registered Electors	86,685		482,356		15,734,587	

=== 2005 Sri Lankan Presidential Election ===
Party	Trincomalee		Trincomalee Electoral District		Sri Lanka	
Party	Votes	%	Votes	%	Votes	%
UNP	41,369	77.90%	92,197	61.33%	4,706,366	48.43%
UPFA	10,878	20.48%	55,680	37.04%	4,887,152	50.29%
Other Parties (with < 1%)	859	1.62%	2,457	1.63%	123,521	1.27%
Valid Votes	53,106	98.23%	150,334	98.63%	9,717,039	98.88%
Rejected Votes	956	1.77%	2,094	1.37%	109,869	1.12%
Total Polled	54,062	59.35%	152,428	31.92%	9,826,908	69.51%
Registered Electors	91,095		477,540		14,136,979	

=== 1999 Sri Lankan Presidential Election ===
Party	Trincomalee		Trincomalee Electoral District		Sri Lanka	
Party	Votes	%	Votes	%	Votes	%
UNP	28,061	64.13%	63,351	50.25%	3,602,748	42.71%
PA	13,807	31.56%	56,691	44.96%	4,312,157	51.12%
Other Parties (with < 1%)	1,313	3.00%	3,732	2.96%	176,679	2.09%
JVP	573	1.31%	2,307	1.83%	343,927	4.08%
Valid Votes	43,754	97.27%	126,081	97.95%	8,435,754	97.69%
Rejected Votes	1,227	2.73%	2,642	2.05%	199,536	2.31%
Total Polled	44,981	58.05%	128,723	62.76%	8,635,290	72.17%
Registered Electors	77,484		205,116		11,965,536	

=== 1994 Sri Lankan Presidential Election ===
Party	Trincomalee		Trincomalee Electoral District		Sri Lanka	
Party	Votes	%	Votes	%	Votes	%
PA	28,900	85.58%	77,943	71.62%	4,709,205	62.28%
UNP	3,925	11.62%	28,006	25.74%	2,715,283	35.91%
Ind 2	697	2.06%	2,074	1.91%	58,888	0.78%
Other Parties (with < 1%)	248	0.73%	798	0.73%	78,152	1.03%
Valid Votes	33,770	98.41%	108,821	98.44%	7,561,526	98.03%
Rejected Votes	545	1.59%	1,726	1.56%	151,706	1.97%
Total Polled	34,315	50.83%	110,547	58.80%	7,713,232	69.12%
Registered Electors	67,509		188,017		11,158,880	

=== 1988 Sri Lankan Presidential Election ===
Party	Trincomalee		Trincomalee Electoral District		Sri Lanka	
Party	Votes	%	Votes	%	Votes	%
SLMP	8,378	37.64%	14,103	17.49%	235,701	4.63%
UNP	8,112	36.45%	36,841	45.70%	2,569,199	50.43%
SLFP	5,767	25.91%	29,679	36.81%	2,289,857	44.95%
Valid Votes	22,257	97.52%	80,620	98.38%	5,094,754	98.24%
Rejected Votes	565	2.48%	1,326	1.62%	91,499	1.76%
Total Polled	22,822	40.73%	81,949	53.72%	5,186,256	55.87%
Registered Electors	56,026		152,540		9,283,143	

=== 1982 Sri Lankan Presidential Election ===
Party	Trincomalee		Trincomalee Electoral District		Sri Lanka	
Party	Votes	%	Votes	%	Votes	%
UNP	14,503	53.97%	45,522	48.64%	3,450,815	52.93%
SLFP	5,424	20.18%	31,700	33.87%	2,546,348	39.05%
ACTC	5,366	19.97%	10,068	10.76%	173,934	2.67%
JVP	1,305	4.86%	5,395	5.76%	273,428	4.19%
Other Parties (with < 1%)	274	1.02%	911	0.97%	75,526	1.16%
Valid Votes	26,872	97.19%	93,596	98.12%	6,520,156	98.78%
Rejected Votes	777	2.81%	1,795	1.88%	80,470	1.22%
Total Polled	27,649	56.15%	95,391	70.69%	6,600,626	80.15%
Registered Electors	49,244		134,948		8,235,358	

== Parliamentary Election Results ==
=== Summary ===
The winner of Trincomalee has matched the final country result 0 out of 7 times.

Year	Trincomalee	Trincomalee Electoral District	MAE %	Sri Lanka	MAE %
2015	ITAK	UNP	14.56%	UNP	20.80%
2010	ITAK	UPFA	15.58%	UPFA	25.47%
2004	ITAK	ITAK	17.61%	UPFA	33.80%
2001	TULF	UNP	17.10%	UNP	22.90%
2000	UNP	PA	10.88%	PA	15.28%
1994	TULF	UNP	13.11%	PA	31.41%
1989	INDI	INDI	13.09%	UNP	31.30%
Matches/Mean MAE	0/7	4/7	14.56%	7/7	25.85%

=== 2015 Sri Lankan Parliamentary Election ===
Party	Trincomalee		Trincomalee Electoral District		Sri Lanka	
Party	Votes	%	Votes	%	Votes	%
ITAK	27,612	48.72%	45,894	25.49%	515,963	4.63%
UNP	17,674	31.18%	83,638	46.45%	5,098,916	45.77%
UPFA	8,211	14.49%	38,463	21.36%	4,732,664	42.48%
IG0	913	1.61%	6,520	3.62%	14,927	0.13%
Other Parties (with < 1%)	885	1.56%	1,850	1.03%	83,525	0.75%
AITC	783	1.38%	1,144	0.64%	18,644	0.17%
JVP	599	1.06%	2,556	1.42%	544,154	4.88%
Valid Votes	56,677	93.73%	180,065	94.31%	11,140,333	95.35%
Rejected Votes	3,755	6.21%	10,542	5.52%	516,926	4.42%
Total Polled	60,469	69.52%	190,938	74.34%	11,684,111	77.66%
Registered Electors	86,978		256,852		15,044,490	

=== 2010 Sri Lankan Parliamentary Election ===
Party	Trincomalee		Trincomalee Electoral District		Sri Lanka	
Party	Votes	%	Votes	%	Votes	%
ITAK	20,578	47.41%	33,268	23.85%	233,190	2.91%
UPFA	10,961	25.25%	59,784	42.85%	4,846,388	60.38%
UNP	8,718	20.09%	39,691	28.45%	2,357,057	29.37%
TMVP	1,106	2.55%	1,712	1.23%	20,284	0.25%
AITC	956	2.20%	1,182	0.85%	7,544	0.09%
Other Parties (with < 1%)	561	1.29%	1,357	0.97%	33,457	0.42%
DNA	522	1.20%	2,519	1.81%	441,251	5.50%
Valid Votes	43,402	92.47%	139,513	93.02%	8,026,322	96.03%
Rejected Votes	3,483	7.42%	10,240	6.83%	581,465	6.96%
Total Polled	46,937	54.15%	149,982	59.19%	8,358,246	59.29%
Registered Electors	86,685		253,399		14,097,690	

=== 2004 Sri Lankan Parliamentary Election ===
Party	Trincomalee		Trincomalee Electoral District		Sri Lanka	
Party	Votes	%	Votes	%	Votes	%
ITAK	43,880	65.16%	69,087	37.77%	633,203	6.85%
SLMC	13,378	19.86%	65,191	35.64%	186,880	2.02%
UPFA	6,229	9.25%	31,053	16.98%	4,223,126	45.70%
UNP	3,193	4.74%	15,693	8.58%	3,486,792	37.73%
Other Parties (with < 1%)	667	0.99%	1,906	1.04%	601,931	6.51%
Valid Votes	67,347	95.64%	182,930	95.38%	9,241,931	94.52%
Rejected Votes	3,073	4.36%	8,863	4.62%	534,452	5.47%
Total Polled	70,420	81.62%	191,793	85.33%	9,777,821	75.74%
Registered Electors	86,277		224,764		12,909,631	

=== 2001 Sri Lankan Parliamentary Election ===
Party	Trincomalee		Trincomalee Electoral District		Sri Lanka	
Party	Votes	%	Votes	%	Votes	%
TULF	35,639	60.93%	56,121	34.83%	348,164	3.89%
UNP	14,560	24.89%	62,930	39.05%	4,086,026	45.62%
PA	5,027	8.59%	32,997	20.48%	3,330,815	37.19%
JVP	1,664	2.84%	6,095	3.78%	815,353	9.10%
EPDP	1,209	2.07%	1,470	0.91%	72,783	0.81%
Other Parties (with < 1%)	396	0.68%	1,525	0.95%	128,199	1.43%
Valid Votes	58,495	94.73%	161,138	95.03%	8,955,844	94.77%
Rejected Votes	3,251	5.27%	8,429	4.97%	494,009	5.23%
Total Polled	61,746	75.83%	169,567	79.88%	9,449,878	76.03%
Registered Electors	81,422		212,280		12,428,762	

=== 2000 Sri Lankan Parliamentary Election ===
Party	Trincomalee		Trincomalee Electoral District		Sri Lanka	
Party	Votes	%	Votes	%	Votes	%
UNP	12,861	26.75%	46,676	35.08%	3,451,765	40.12%
PA	11,928	24.81%	53,802	40.44%	3,899,329	45.33%
TULF	11,070	23.02%	14,088	10.59%	105,907	1.23%
EPDP	3,382	7.03%	4,524	3.40%	50,702	0.59%
ACTC	3,269	6.80%	3,748	2.82%	27,289	0.32%
IG2	2,268	4.72%	2,621	1.97%	31,443	0.37%
Other Parties (with < 1%)	1,208	2.51%	1,979	1.49%	216,732	2.52%
JVP	901	1.87%	3,293	2.48%	518,725	6.03%
IG3	674	1.40%	1,434	1.08%	6,109	0.07%
IG6	526	1.09%	872	0.66%	3,162	0.04%
Valid Votes	48,087	N/A	133,037	N/A	8,602,617	N/A

=== 1994 Sri Lankan Parliamentary Election ===
Party	Trincomalee		Trincomalee Electoral District		Sri Lanka	
Party	Votes	%	Votes	%	Votes	%
TULF	18,548	47.79%	28,380	23.66%	132,461	1.67%
SLMC	5,710	14.71%	26,903	22.43%	143,307	1.80%
UNP	5,703	14.69%	34,986	29.17%	3,498,370	44.04%
PA	5,156	13.28%	23,886	19.91%	3,887,805	48.94%
TELO	2,736	7.05%	3,709	3.09%	24,974	0.31%
Other Parties (with < 1%)	551	1.42%	1,197	1.00%	138,277	1.74%
EPRLF	408	1.05%	881	0.73%	9,411	0.12%
Valid Votes	38,812	94.84%	119,942	94.72%	7,943,688	95.20%
Rejected Votes	2,110	5.16%	6,682	5.28%	400,395	4.80%
Total Polled	40,922	60.62%	126,624	67.36%	8,344,095	74.75%
Registered Electors	67,509		187,991		11,163,064	

=== 1989 Sri Lankan Parliamentary Election ===
Party	Trincomalee		Trincomalee Electoral District		Sri Lanka	
Party	Votes	%	Votes	%	Votes	%
INDI	15,915	46.30%	25,239	24.85%	175,579	3.14%
TULF	7,325	21.31%	12,755	12.56%	188,594	3.37%
SLMC	5,164	15.02%	17,884	17.61%	202,016	3.61%
SLFP	2,950	8.58%	22,966	22.61%	1,785,369	31.90%
UNP	2,881	8.38%	22,450	22.10%	2,838,005	50.71%
Other Parties (with < 1%)	141	0.41%	284	0.28%	90,480	1.62%
Valid Votes	34,376	96.36%	101,578	95.42%	5,596,468	93.87%
Rejected Votes	1,299	3.64%	4,878	4.58%	365,563	6.13%
Total Polled	35,675	64.59%	106,456	69.90%	5,962,031	63.60%
Registered Electors	55,236		152,289		9,374,164	

== Demographics ==
=== Ethnicity ===
The Trincomalee Polling Division has a Sri Lankan Tamil majority (54.9%), a significant Moor population (26.3%) and a significant Sinhalese population (17.2%) . In comparison, the Trincomalee Electoral District (which contains the Trincomalee Polling Division) has a Moor plurality (41.8%), a significant Sri Lankan Tamil population (30.7%) and a significant Sinhalese population (26.7%)

Ethnicity in Trincomalee
1. Sri Lankan Tamil (54.9%)
2. Moor (26.3%)
3. Sinhalese (17.2%)
4. Other (1.60%)

=== Religion ===
The Trincomalee Polling Division has a Hindu plurality (43.6%), a significant Muslim population (26.6%) and a significant Buddhist population (16.1%) . In comparison, the Trincomalee Electoral District (which contains the Trincomalee Polling Division) has a Muslim plurality (42.0%), a significant Buddhist population (26.2%) and a significant Hindu population (25.9%)

Religion in Trincomalee
1. Hindu (43.6%)
2. Muslim (26.6%)
3. Buddhist (16.1%)
4. Roman Catholic (9.50%)
5. Other Christian (4.20%)
6. Other (0.00%)
