= Mutur Polling Division =

Mutur
- Polling Division
- Coordinates: 8.458283°N 81.308035°E
- Country: Sri Lanka
- Province: Eastern Province, Sri Lanka
- Electoral District: Trincomalee Electoral District

Area
  - Total: 183.93 km^{2} (71.02 sq mi)

Population (2012)
  - Total: 56,621
  - Density: 308/km^{2} (800/sq mi)
- ISO 3166 code: EC-14C

The Mutur Polling Division is a Polling Division in the Trincomalee Electoral District, in the Eastern Province, Sri Lanka.

== Presidential Election Results ==
=== Summary ===
The winner of Mutur has matched the final country result 5 out of 8 times. Hence, Muttur is a Weak Bellwether for Presidential Elections.

Year	Mutur	Trincomalee Electoral District	MAE %	Sri Lanka	MAE %
2019	NDF	NDF	17.10%	SLPP	44.47%
2015	NDF	NDF	15.50%	NDF	36.07%
2010	NDF	NDF	4.86%	UPFA	19.10%
2005	UNP	UNP	1.66%	UPFA	11.29%
1999	PA	UNP	4.72%	PA	1.81%
1994	PA	PA	3.96%	PA	5.56%
1988	UNP	UNP	3.48%	UNP	5.26%
1982	UNP	UNP	3.92%	UNP	4.48%
Matches/Mean MAE	5/8	4/8	6.90%	8/8	16.00%

=== 2019 Sri Lankan Presidential Election ===
Party	Mutur		Trincomalee Electoral District		Sri Lanka	
Party	Votes	%	Votes	%	Votes	%
NDF	74,171	90.15%	166,841	72.10%	5,564,239	41.99%
SLPP	4,925	5.99%	54,135	23.39%	6,924,255	52.25%
Other Parties (with < 1%)	3,180	3.87%	10,434	4.51%	764,005	5.76%
Valid Votes	82,276	99.30%	231,410	99.21%	13,252,499	98.99%
Rejected Votes	576	0.70%	1,832	0.79%	135,452	1.01%
Total Polled	82,852	80.29%	233,242	82.97%	13,387,951	83.71%
Registered Electors	103,197		281,114		15,992,568	

=== 2015 Sri Lankan Presidential Election ===
Party	Mutur		Trincomalee Electoral District		Sri Lanka	
Party	Votes	%	Votes	%	Votes	%
NDF	57,532	87.54%	140,338	71.84%	6,217,162	51.28%
UPFA	7,132	10.85%	52,111	26.67%	5,768,090	47.58%
Other Parties (with < 1%)	1,055	1.61%	2,907	1.49%	138,200	1.14%
Valid Votes	65,719	99.30%	195,356	99.08%	12,123,452	98.85%
Rejected Votes	461	0.70%	1,805	0.92%	140,925	1.15%
Total Polled	66,180	69.08%	197,161	72.50%	12,264,377	78.69%
Registered Electors	95,804		271,953		15,585,942	

=== 2010 Sri Lankan Presidential Election ===
Party	Mutur		Trincomalee Electoral District		Sri Lanka	
Party	Votes	%	Votes	%	Votes	%
NDF	32,631	59.09%	87,661	54.09%	4,173,185	40.15%
UPFA	21,002	38.03%	69,752	43.04%	6,015,934	57.88%
Other Parties (with < 1%)	1,586	2.87%	4,659	2.87%	204,494	1.97%
Valid Votes	55,219	98.76%	162,072	98.52%	10,393,613	99.03%
Rejected Votes	696	1.24%	2,432	1.48%	101,838	0.97%
Total Polled	55,915	65.47%	164,504	34.10%	10,495,451	66.70%
Registered Electors	85,401		482,356		15,734,587	

=== 2005 Sri Lankan Presidential Election ===
Party	Mutur		Trincomalee Electoral District		Sri Lanka	
Party	Votes	%	Votes	%	Votes	%
UNP	29,061	59.54%	92,197	61.33%	4,706,366	48.43%
UPFA	18,817	38.55%	55,680	37.04%	4,887,152	50.29%
Other Parties (with < 1%)	930	1.91%	2,457	1.63%	123,521	1.27%
Valid Votes	48,808	98.90%	150,334	98.63%	9,717,039	98.88%
Rejected Votes	542	1.10%	2,094	1.37%	109,869	1.12%
Total Polled	49,350	60.53%	152,428	31.92%	9,826,908	69.51%
Registered Electors	81,534		477,540		14,136,979	

=== 1999 Sri Lankan Presidential Election ===
Party	Mutur		Trincomalee Electoral District		Sri Lanka	
Party	Votes	%	Votes	%	Votes	%
PA	20,908	50.60%	56,691	44.96%	4,312,157	51.12%
UNP	18,987	45.95%	63,351	50.25%	3,602,748	42.71%
Other Parties (with < 1%)	1,429	3.46%	6,039	4.79%	520,606	6.17%
Valid Votes	41,324	98.30%	126,081	97.95%	8,435,754	97.69%
Rejected Votes	716	1.70%	2,642	2.05%	199,536	2.31%
Total Polled	42,040	63.04%	128,723	62.76%	8,635,290	72.17%
Registered Electors	66,690		205,116		11,965,536	

=== 1994 Sri Lankan Presidential Election ===
Party	Mutur		Trincomalee Electoral District		Sri Lanka	
Party	Votes	%	Votes	%	Votes	%
PA	25,721	67.42%	77,943	71.62%	4,709,205	62.28%
UNP	11,209	29.38%	28,006	25.74%	2,715,283	35.91%
Ind 2	946	2.48%	2,074	1.91%	58,888	0.78%
Other Parties (with < 1%)	276	0.72%	798	0.73%	78,152	1.03%
Valid Votes	38,152	98.72%	108,821	98.44%	7,561,526	98.03%
Rejected Votes	495	1.28%	1,726	1.56%	151,706	1.97%
Total Polled	38,647	62.39%	110,547	58.80%	7,713,232	69.12%
Registered Electors	61,949		188,017		11,158,880	

=== 1988 Sri Lankan Presidential Election ===
Party	Mutur		Trincomalee Electoral District		Sri Lanka	
Party	Votes	%	Votes	%	Votes	%
UNP	16,283	50.45%	36,841	45.70%	2,569,199	50.43%
SLFP	11,087	34.35%	29,679	36.81%	2,289,857	44.95%
SLMP	4,909	15.21%	14,103	17.49%	235,701	4.63%
Valid Votes	32,276	98.91%	80,620	98.38%	5,094,754	98.24%
Rejected Votes	352	1.08%	1,326	1.62%	91,499	1.76%
Total Polled	32,631	67.18%	81,949	53.72%	5,186,256	55.87%
Registered Electors	48,570		152,540		9,283,143	

=== 1982 Sri Lankan Presidential Election ===
Party	Mutur		Trincomalee Electoral District		Sri Lanka	
Party	Votes	%	Votes	%	Votes	%
UNP	14,529	46.85%	45,522	48.64%	3,450,815	52.93%
SLFP	12,900	41.60%	31,700	33.87%	2,546,348	39.05%
ACTC	2,760	8.90%	10,068	10.76%	173,934	2.67%
JVP	509	1.64%	5,395	5.76%	273,428	4.19%
Other Parties (with < 1%)	311	1.00%	911	0.97%	75,526	1.16%
Valid Votes	31,009	98.30%	93,596	98.12%	6,520,156	98.78%
Rejected Votes	536	1.70%	1,795	1.88%	80,470	1.22%
Total Polled	31,545	78.04%	95,391	70.69%	6,600,626	80.15%
Registered Electors	40,422		134,948		8,235,358	

== Parliamentary Election Results ==
=== Summary ===
The winner of Muttur has matched the final country result 3 out of 7 times.

Year	Mutur	Trincomalee Electoral District	MAE %	Sri Lanka	MAE %
2015	UNP	UNP	13.76%	UNP	24.20%
2010	UNP	UPFA	8.66%	UPFA	18.89%
2004	SLMC	ITAK	19.59%	UPFA	36.46%
2001	UNP	UNP	8.74%	UNP	11.31%
2000	PA	PA	6.74%	PA	2.71%
1994	SLMC	UNP	11.62%	PA	28.70%
1989	SLMC	INDI	4.22%	UNP	20.23%
Matches/Mean MAE	3/7	4/7	10.48%	7/7	20.36%

=== 2015 Sri Lankan Parliamentary Election ===
Party	Mutur		Trincomalee Electoral District		Sri Lanka	
Party	Votes	%	Votes	%	Votes	%
UNP	40,130	64.98%	83,638	46.45%	5,098,916	45.77%
ITAK	10,555	17.09%	45,894	25.49%	515,963	4.63%
IG0	5,196	8.41%	6,520	3.62%	14,927	0.13%
UPFA	5,033	8.15%	38,463	21.36%	4,732,664	42.48%
Other Parties (with < 1%)	841	1.36%	5,550	3.08%	646,323	5.80%
Valid Votes	61,755	94.05%	180,065	94.31%	11,140,333	95.35%
Rejected Votes	3,652	5.56%	10,542	5.52%	516,926	4.42%
Total Polled	65,662	68.54%	190,938	74.34%	11,684,111	77.66%
Registered Electors	95,804		256,852		15,044,490	

=== 2010 Sri Lankan Parliamentary Election ===
Party	Mutur		Trincomalee Electoral District		Sri Lanka	
Party	Votes	%	Votes	%	Votes	%
UNP	21,963	44.32%	39,691	28.45%	2,357,057	29.37%
UPFA	18,576	37.48%	59,784	42.85%	4,846,388	60.38%
ITAK	8,068	16.28%	33,268	23.85%	233,190	2.91%
Other Parties (with < 1%)	952	1.92%	6,770	4.85%	502,536	6.26%
Valid Votes	49,559	93.64%	139,513	93.02%	8,026,322	96.03%
Rejected Votes	3,246	6.13%	10,240	6.83%	581,465	6.96%
Total Polled	52,927	61.97%	149,982	59.19%	8,358,246	59.29%
Registered Electors	85,401		253,399		14,097,690	

=== 2004 Sri Lankan Parliamentary Election ===
Party	Mutur		Trincomalee Electoral District		Sri Lanka	
Party	Votes	%	Votes	%	Votes	%
SLMC	45,523	69.58%	65,191	35.64%	186,880	2.02%
ITAK	17,005	25.99%	69,087	37.77%	633,203	6.85%
UPFA	1,854	2.83%	31,053	16.98%	4,223,126	45.70%
UNP	689	1.05%	15,693	8.58%	3,486,792	37.73%
Other Parties (with < 1%)	354	0.54%	1,906	1.04%	601,931	6.51%
Valid Votes	65,425	95.50%	182,930	95.38%	9,241,931	94.52%
Rejected Votes	3,080	4.50%	8,863	4.62%	534,452	5.47%
Total Polled	68,505	91.50%	191,793	85.33%	9,777,821	75.74%
Registered Electors	74,869		224,764		12,909,631	

=== 2001 Sri Lankan Parliamentary Election ===
Party	Mutur		Trincomalee Electoral District		Sri Lanka	
Party	Votes	%	Votes	%	Votes	%
UNP	29,473	52.82%	62,930	39.05%	4,086,026	45.62%
TULF	14,393	25.79%	56,121	34.83%	348,164	3.89%
PA	11,199	20.07%	32,997	20.48%	3,330,815	37.19%
Other Parties (with < 1%)	736	1.32%	9,090	5.64%	1,016,335	11.35%
Valid Votes	55,801	95.15%	161,138	95.03%	8,955,844	94.77%
Rejected Votes	2,844	4.85%	8,429	4.97%	494,009	5.23%
Total Polled	58,645	83.58%	169,567	79.88%	9,449,878	76.03%
Registered Electors	70,168		212,280		12,428,762	

=== 2000 Sri Lankan Parliamentary Election ===
Party	Mutur		Trincomalee Electoral District		Sri Lanka	
Party	Votes	%	Votes	%	Votes	%
PA	21,393	49.62%	53,802	40.44%	3,899,329	45.33%
UNP	17,688	41.03%	46,676	35.08%	3,451,765	40.12%
TULF	1,615	3.75%	14,088	10.59%	105,907	1.23%
Other Parties (with < 1%)	1,059	2.46%	12,513	9.41%	797,351	9.27%
EPDP	746	1.73%	4,524	3.40%	50,702	0.59%
IG3	609	1.41%	1,434	1.08%	6,109	0.07%
Valid Votes	43,110	N/A	133,037	N/A	8,602,617	N/A

=== 1994 Sri Lankan Parliamentary Election ===
Party	Mutur		Trincomalee Electoral District		Sri Lanka	
Party	Votes	%	Votes	%	Votes	%
SLMC	18,677	45.21%	26,903	22.43%	143,307	1.80%
UNP	13,773	33.34%	34,986	29.17%	3,498,370	44.04%
TULF	6,817	16.50%	28,380	23.66%	132,461	1.67%
PA	856	2.07%	23,886	19.91%	3,887,805	48.94%
TELO	651	1.58%	3,709	3.09%	24,974	0.31%
Other Parties (with < 1%)	538	1.30%	2,078	1.73%	147,688	1.86%
Valid Votes	41,312	94.92%	119,942	94.72%	7,943,688	95.20%
Rejected Votes	2,210	5.08%	6,682	5.28%	400,395	4.80%
Total Polled	43,522	70.25%	126,624	67.36%	8,344,095	74.75%
Registered Electors	61,949		187,991		11,163,064	

=== 1989 Sri Lankan Parliamentary Election ===
Party	Mutur		Trincomalee Electoral District		Sri Lanka	
Party	Votes	%	Votes	%	Votes	%
SLMC	10,804	28.96%	17,884	17.61%	202,016	3.61%
SLFP	8,036	21.54%	22,966	22.61%	1,785,369	31.90%
UNP	7,681	20.59%	22,450	22.10%	2,838,005	50.71%
INDI	7,565	20.28%	25,239	24.85%	175,579	3.14%
TULF	3,160	8.47%	12,755	12.56%	188,594	3.37%
Other Parties (with < 1%)	63	0.17%	284	0.28%	90,480	1.62%
Valid Votes	37,309	96.02%	101,578	95.42%	5,596,468	93.87%
Rejected Votes	1,547	3.98%	4,878	4.58%	365,563	6.13%
Total Polled	38,856	80.51%	106,456	69.90%	5,962,031	63.60%
Registered Electors	48,260		152,289		9,374,164	

== Demographics ==
=== Ethnicity ===
The Mutur Polling Division has a Moor majority (61.9%) and a significant Sri Lankan Tamil population (37.0%) . In comparison, the Trincomalee Electoral District (which contains the Mutur Polling Division) has a Moor plurality (41.8%), a significant Sri Lankan Tamil population (30.7%) and a significant Sinhalese population (26.7%)

Ethnicity in Muttur
1. Moor (61.9%)
2. Sri Lankan Tamil (37.0%)
3. Other (1.10%)

=== Religion ===
The Mutur Polling Division has a Muslim majority (62.0%) and a significant Hindu population (33.0%) . In comparison, the Trincomalee Electoral District (which contains the Mutur Polling Division) has a Muslim plurality (42.0%), a significant Buddhist population (26.2%) and a significant Hindu population (25.9%)

Religion in Muttur
1. Muslim (62.0%)
2. Hindu (33.0%)
3. Roman Catholic (2.60%)
4. Other Christian (1.60%)
5. Other (0.80%)
