= Seruwila Polling Division =

Seruwila
- Polling Division
- Coordinates: 8.454403°N 81.165432°E
- Country: Sri Lanka
- Province: Eastern Province, Sri Lanka
- Electoral District: Trincomalee Electoral District

Area
  - Total: 1,803.72 km^{2} (696.42 sq mi)

Population (2012)
  - Total: 192,215
  - Density: 107/km^{2} (280/sq mi)
- ISO 3166 code: EC-14A

The Seruwila Polling Division is a Polling Division in the Trincomalee Electoral District, in the Eastern Province, Sri Lanka.

== Presidential Election Results ==
=== Summary ===
The winner of Seruwila has matched the final country result 6 out of 8 times. Hence, Seruwila is a Weak Bellwether for Presidential Elections.

Year	Seruwila	Trincomalee Electoral District	MAE %	Sri Lanka	MAE %
2019	SLPP	NDF	25.78%	SLPP	2.50%
2015	UPFA	NDF	23.99%	NDF	3.62%
2010	UPFA	NDF	19.25%	UPFA	5.30%
2005	UPFA	UNP	16.28%	UPFA	3.45%
1999	PA	UNP	10.45%	PA	3.78%
1994	PA	PA	9.10%	PA	0.26%
1988	SLFP	UNP	8.02%	UNP	3.41%
1982	UNP	UNP	3.61%	UNP	4.43%
Matches/Mean MAE	6/8	4/8	14.56%	8/8	3.34%

=== 2019 Sri Lankan Presidential Election ===
Party	Seruwila		Trincomalee Electoral District		Sri Lanka	
Party	Votes	%	Votes	%	Votes	%
SLPP	31,303	49.90%	54,135	23.39%	6,924,255	52.25%
NDF	28,205	44.96%	166,841	72.10%	5,564,239	41.99%
Other Parties (with < 1%)	1,631	2.60%	6,704	2.90%	345,452	2.61%
NMPP	1,598	2.55%	3,730	1.61%	418,553	3.16%
Valid Votes	62,737	99.47%	231,410	99.21%	13,252,499	98.99%
Rejected Votes	333	0.53%	1,832	0.79%	135,452	1.01%
Total Polled	63,070	86.53%	233,242	82.97%	13,387,951	83.71%
Registered Electors	72,888		281,114		15,992,568	

=== 2015 Sri Lankan Presidential Election ===
Party	Seruwila		Trincomalee Electoral District		Sri Lanka	
Party	Votes	%	Votes	%	Votes	%
UPFA	26,716	51.12%	52,111	26.67%	5,768,090	47.58%
NDF	24,833	47.52%	140,338	71.84%	6,217,162	51.28%
Other Parties (with < 1%)	712	1.36%	2,907	1.49%	138,200	1.14%
Valid Votes	52,261	99.16%	195,356	99.08%	12,123,452	98.85%
Rejected Votes	442	0.84%	1,805	0.92%	140,925	1.15%
Total Polled	52,703	71.15%	197,161	72.50%	12,264,377	78.69%
Registered Electors	74,070		271,953		15,585,942	

=== 2010 Sri Lankan Presidential Election ===
Party	Seruwila		Trincomalee Electoral District		Sri Lanka	
Party	Votes	%	Votes	%	Votes	%
UPFA	27,932	63.10%	69,752	43.04%	6,015,934	57.88%
NDF	15,260	34.47%	87,661	54.09%	4,173,185	40.15%
Other Parties (with < 1%)	1,077	2.43%	4,659	2.87%	204,494	1.97%
Valid Votes	44,269	98.74%	162,072	98.52%	10,393,613	99.03%
Rejected Votes	563	1.26%	2,432	1.48%	101,838	0.97%
Total Polled	44,832	64.93%	164,504	34.10%	10,495,451	66.70%
Registered Electors	69,047		482,356		15,734,587	

=== 2005 Sri Lankan Presidential Election ===
Party	Seruwila		Trincomalee Electoral District		Sri Lanka	
Party	Votes	%	Votes	%	Votes	%
UPFA	21,353	53.71%	55,680	37.04%	4,887,152	50.29%
UNP	17,835	44.86%	92,197	61.33%	4,706,366	48.43%
Other Parties (with < 1%)	571	1.44%	2,457	1.63%	123,521	1.27%
Valid Votes	39,759	98.99%	150,334	98.63%	9,717,039	98.88%
Rejected Votes	406	1.01%	2,094	1.37%	109,869	1.12%
Total Polled	40,165	60.74%	152,428	31.92%	9,826,908	69.51%
Registered Electors	66,126		477,540		14,136,979	

=== 1999 Sri Lankan Presidential Election ===
Party	Seruwila		Trincomalee Electoral District		Sri Lanka	
Party	Votes	%	Votes	%	Votes	%
PA	20,781	54.96%	56,691	44.96%	4,312,157	51.12%
UNP	14,551	38.49%	63,351	50.25%	3,602,748	42.71%
JVP	1,515	4.01%	2,307	1.83%	343,927	4.08%
Other Parties (with < 1%)	961	2.54%	3,732	2.96%	176,679	2.09%
Valid Votes	37,808	98.47%	126,081	97.95%	8,435,754	97.69%
Rejected Votes	586	1.53%	2,642	2.05%	199,536	2.31%
Total Polled	38,394	66.62%	128,723	62.76%	8,635,290	72.17%
Registered Electors	57,634		205,116		11,965,536	

=== 1994 Sri Lankan Presidential Election ===
Party	Seruwila		Trincomalee Electoral District		Sri Lanka	
Party	Votes	%	Votes	%	Votes	%
PA	20,621	62.45%	77,943	71.62%	4,709,205	62.28%
UNP	11,726	35.51%	28,006	25.74%	2,715,283	35.91%
Ind 2	415	1.26%	2,074	1.91%	58,888	0.78%
Other Parties (with < 1%)	256	0.78%	798	0.73%	78,152	1.03%
Valid Votes	33,018	98.10%	108,821	98.44%	7,561,526	98.03%
Rejected Votes	640	1.90%	1,726	1.56%	151,706	1.97%
Total Polled	33,658	61.61%	110,547	58.80%	7,713,232	69.12%
Registered Electors	54,632		188,017		11,158,880	

=== 1988 Sri Lankan Presidential Election ===
Party	Seruwila		Trincomalee Electoral District		Sri Lanka	
Party	Votes	%	Votes	%	Votes	%
SLFP	12,733	49.27%	29,679	36.81%	2,289,857	44.95%
UNP	12,319	47.67%	36,841	45.70%	2,569,199	50.43%
SLMP	789	3.05%	14,103	17.49%	235,701	4.63%
Valid Votes	25,841	98.46%	80,620	98.38%	5,094,754	98.24%
Rejected Votes	404	1.54%	1,326	1.62%	91,499	1.76%
Total Polled	26,245	55.03%	81,949	53.72%	5,186,256	55.87%
Registered Electors	47,693		152,540		9,283,143	

=== 1982 Sri Lankan Presidential Election ===
Party	Seruwila		Trincomalee Electoral District		Sri Lanka	
Party	Votes	%	Votes	%	Votes	%
UNP	15,823	45.92%	45,522	48.64%	3,450,815	52.93%
SLFP	13,097	38.01%	31,700	33.87%	2,546,348	39.05%
JVP	3,536	10.26%	5,395	5.76%	273,428	4.19%
ACTC	1,708	4.96%	10,068	10.76%	173,934	2.67%
Other Parties (with < 1%)	291	0.84%	911	0.97%	75,526	1.16%
Valid Votes	34,455	98.74%	93,596	98.12%	6,520,156	98.78%
Rejected Votes	440	1.26%	1,795	1.88%	80,470	1.22%
Total Polled	34,895	79.34%	95,391	70.69%	6,600,626	80.15%
Registered Electors	43,980		134,948		8,235,358	

== Parliamentary Election Results ==
=== Summary ===
The winner of Seruwila has matched the final country result 5 out of 7 times. Hence, Seruwila is a Weak Bellwether for Parliamentary Elections.

Year	Seruwila	Trincomalee Electoral District	MAE %	Sri Lanka	MAE %
2015	UPFA	UNP	11.39%	UNP	3.38%
2010	UPFA	UPFA	15.35%	UPFA	5.71%
2004	UPFA	ITAK	23.90%	UPFA	6.54%
2001	UNP	UNP	12.00%	UNP	2.99%
2000	PA	PA	6.37%	PA	2.57%
1994	PA	UNP	17.13%	PA	2.48%
1989	SLFP	INDI	15.70%	UNP	8.53%
Matches/Mean MAE	5/7	4/7	14.55%	7/7	4.60%

=== 2015 Sri Lankan Parliamentary Election ===
Party	Seruwila		Trincomalee Electoral District		Sri Lanka	
Party	Votes	%	Votes	%	Votes	%
UPFA	22,325	43.82%	38,463	21.36%	4,732,664	42.48%
UNP	20,619	40.47%	83,638	46.45%	5,098,916	45.77%
ITAK	5,628	11.05%	45,894	25.49%	515,963	4.63%
JVP	1,562	3.07%	2,556	1.42%	544,154	4.88%
Other Parties (with < 1%)	814	1.60%	9,514	5.28%	117,096	1.05%
Valid Votes	50,948	94.38%	180,065	94.31%	11,140,333	95.35%
Rejected Votes	2,998	5.55%	10,542	5.52%	516,926	4.42%
Total Polled	53,982	72.88%	190,938	74.34%	11,684,111	77.66%
Registered Electors	74,070		256,852		15,044,490	

=== 2010 Sri Lankan Parliamentary Election ===
Party	Seruwila		Trincomalee Electoral District		Sri Lanka	
Party	Votes	%	Votes	%	Votes	%
UPFA	22,756	64.70%	59,784	42.85%	4,846,388	60.38%
UNP	6,936	19.72%	39,691	28.45%	2,357,057	29.37%
ITAK	3,297	9.37%	33,268	23.85%	233,190	2.91%
DNA	1,460	4.15%	2,519	1.81%	441,251	5.50%
Other Parties (with < 1%)	721	2.05%	4,251	3.05%	61,285	0.76%
Valid Votes	35,170	92.39%	139,513	93.02%	8,026,322	96.03%
Rejected Votes	2,854	7.50%	10,240	6.83%	581,465	6.96%
Total Polled	38,067	55.13%	149,982	59.19%	8,358,246	59.29%
Registered Electors	69,047		253,399		14,097,690	

=== 2004 Sri Lankan Parliamentary Election ===
Party	Seruwila		Trincomalee Electoral District		Sri Lanka	
Party	Votes	%	Votes	%	Votes	%
UPFA	19,607	47.22%	31,053	16.98%	4,223,126	45.70%
UNP	10,346	24.92%	15,693	8.58%	3,486,792	37.73%
ITAK	6,178	14.88%	69,087	37.77%	633,203	6.85%
SLMC	4,647	11.19%	65,191	35.64%	186,880	2.02%
JHU	563	1.36%	791	0.43%	552,723	5.98%
Other Parties (with < 1%)	179	0.43%	1,115	0.61%	49,208	0.53%
Valid Votes	41,520	94.48%	182,930	95.38%	9,241,931	94.52%
Rejected Votes	2,424	5.52%	8,863	4.62%	534,452	5.47%
Total Polled	43,944	69.57%	191,793	85.33%	9,777,821	75.74%
Registered Electors	63,161		224,764		12,909,631	

=== 2001 Sri Lankan Parliamentary Election ===
Party	Seruwila		Trincomalee Electoral District		Sri Lanka	
Party	Votes	%	Votes	%	Votes	%
UNP	16,266	40.09%	62,930	39.05%	4,086,026	45.62%
PA	14,965	36.88%	32,997	20.48%	3,330,815	37.19%
TULF	4,796	11.82%	56,121	34.83%	348,164	3.89%
JVP	3,818	9.41%	6,095	3.78%	815,353	9.10%
Other Parties (with < 1%)	733	1.81%	2,995	1.86%	200,982	2.24%
Valid Votes	40,578	94.99%	161,138	95.03%	8,955,844	94.77%
Rejected Votes	2,142	5.01%	8,429	4.97%	494,009	5.23%
Total Polled	42,720	70.39%	169,567	79.88%	9,449,878	76.03%
Registered Electors	60,690		212,280		12,428,762	

=== 2000 Sri Lankan Parliamentary Election ===
Party	Seruwila		Trincomalee Electoral District		Sri Lanka	
Party	Votes	%	Votes	%	Votes	%
PA	18,517	49.93%	53,802	40.44%	3,899,329	45.33%
UNP	14,489	39.07%	46,676	35.08%	3,451,765	40.12%
JVP	2,056	5.54%	3,293	2.48%	518,725	6.03%
Other Parties (with < 1%)	1,078	2.91%	15,178	11.41%	335,437	3.90%
TULF	944	2.55%	14,088	10.59%	105,907	1.23%
Valid Votes	37,084	N/A	133,037	N/A	8,602,617	N/A

=== 1994 Sri Lankan Parliamentary Election ===
Party	Seruwila		Trincomalee Electoral District		Sri Lanka	
Party	Votes	%	Votes	%	Votes	%
PA	17,183	47.53%	23,886	19.91%	3,887,805	48.94%
UNP	14,556	40.26%	34,986	29.17%	3,498,370	44.04%
SLMC	1,870	5.17%	26,903	22.43%	143,307	1.80%
TULF	1,765	4.88%	28,380	23.66%	132,461	1.67%
Other Parties (with < 1%)	780	2.16%	5,787	4.82%	172,662	2.17%
Valid Votes	36,154	93.99%	119,942	94.72%	7,943,688	95.20%
Rejected Votes	2,311	6.01%	6,682	5.28%	400,395	4.80%
Total Polled	38,465	70.41%	126,624	67.36%	8,344,095	74.75%
Registered Electors	54,632		187,991		11,163,064	

=== 1989 Sri Lankan Parliamentary Election ===
Party	Seruwila		Trincomalee Electoral District		Sri Lanka	
Party	Votes	%	Votes	%	Votes	%
SLFP	11,695	40.94%	22,966	22.61%	1,785,369	31.90%
UNP	11,481	40.19%	22,450	22.10%	2,838,005	50.71%
TULF	2,011	7.04%	12,755	12.56%	188,594	3.37%
SLMC	1,848	6.47%	17,884	17.61%	202,016	3.61%
INDI	1,456	5.10%	25,239	24.85%	175,579	3.14%
Other Parties (with < 1%)	77	0.27%	284	0.28%	90,480	1.62%
Valid Votes	28,568	93.48%	101,578	95.42%	5,596,468	93.87%
Rejected Votes	1,993	6.52%	4,878	4.58%	365,563	6.13%
Total Polled	30,561	64.57%	106,456	69.90%	5,962,031	63.60%
Registered Electors	47,331		152,289		9,374,164	

== Demographics ==
=== Ethnicity ===
The Seruwila Polling Division has a Sinhalese plurality (62.2%), a significant Moor population (19.7%) and a significant Sri Lankan Tamil population (15.9%) . In comparison, the Trincomalee Electoral District (which contains the Seruwila Polling Division) has a Moor plurality (41.8%), a significant Sri Lankan Tamil population (30.7%) and a significant Sinhalese population (26.7%)

Ethnicity in Seruvila
1. Sinhalese (62.2%)
2. Moor (19.7%)
3. Sri Lankan Tamil (15.9%)
4. Other (0.00%)

=== Religion ===
The Seruwila Polling Division has a Buddhist plurality (61.0%), a significant Muslim population (20.0%) and a significant Hindu population (11.9%) . In comparison, the Trincomalee Electoral District (which contains the Seruwila Polling Division) has a Muslim plurality (42.0%), a significant Buddhist population (26.2%) and a significant Hindu population (25.9%)

Religion in Seruvila
1. Buddhist (61.0%)
2. Muslim (20.0%)
3. Hindu (11.9%)
4. Christian (3.70%)
