= Trincomalee Electoral District =

Electoral district in Sri Lanka

Trincomalee Electoral District திருகோணமலை தேர்தல் மாவட்டம்
- Electoral District for the Parliament of Sri Lanka
- Administrative District: Trincomalee
- Province: Eastern
- Polling divisions: 3
- Population: 368,000 (2009)
- Electorate: 246,890 (2010)
- Area: 2,727 km^{2} (1,053 sq mi)

Current Electoral District
- Number of members: 4
- MPs: NPP (2) Arun Hemachandra; Roshan Akmeemana SJB (1) Imran Maharoof ITAK (1) Shanmugam Kugathasan

Trincomalee Electoral District (Tamil: திருகோணமலை தேர்தல் மாவட்டம் Tirukōṇamalai Tērtal Māvaṭṭam) is one of the 22 multi-member electoral districts of Sri Lanka created by the 1978 Constitution of Sri Lanka. The district is conterminous with the administrative district of Trincomalee in the Eastern province. The district currently elects 4 of the 225 members of the Sri Lankan Parliament and had 246,890 registered electors in 2010. The district is Sri Lanka's Electorate Number 14.

== Polling Divisions ==
The Trincomalee Electoral District consists of the following polling divisions:

A: Seruwila

B: Trincomalee

C: Mutur

== Election results ==
=== 1982 presidential election ===
Results of the 1st presidential election held on 20 October 1982 for the district:

Candidate	Party	Votes per Polling Division			Postal Votes	Total Votes	%
Candidate	Party	Mutur	Seru- wila	Trinco -malee	Postal Votes	Total Votes	%
J. R. Jayewardene	UNP	14,529	15,823	14,503	667	45,522	48.64%
Hector Kobbekaduwa	SLFP	12,900	13,097	5,424	279	31,700	33.87%
Kumar Ponnambalam	ACTC	2,760	1,708	5,366	234	10,068	10.76%
Rohana Wijeweera	JVP	509	3,536	1,305	45	5,395	5.76%
Colvin de Silva	LSSP	228	211	174	22	635	0.68%
Vasudeva Nanayakkara	NSSP	83	80	100	13	276	0.29%
Valid Votes		31,009	34,455	26,872	1,260	93,596	100.00%
Rejected Votes		536	440	777	42	1,795	
Total Polled		31,545	34,895	27,649	1,302	95,391	
Registered Electors		40,422	43,980	49,244		133,646	
Turnout (%)		78.04%	79.34%	56.15%		71.38%	

=== 1988 provincial council election ===
Results of the 1st North Eastern provincial council election held on 19 November 1988:

Party	Votes per Polling Division			Total Votes	%	Seats
Party	Mutur	Seru- wila	Trinco -malee	Total Votes	%	Seats
Eelam People's Revolutionary Liberation Front	12,311	4,840	25,379	42,530	54.50%	5
Sri Lanka Muslim Congress	24,006	3,764	7,732	35,502	45.50%	5
Valid Votes	36,317	8,604	33,111	78,032	100.00%	10
Rejected Votes	810	295	1,272	2,377		
Total Polled	37,127	8,899	34,383	80,409		
Registered Electors	48,570	47,693	56,026	152,289		
Turnout (%)	76.44%	18.66%	61.37%	52.80%		

=== 1988 presidential election ===
Results of the 2nd presidential election held on 19 December 1988:

Candidate	Party	Votes per Polling Division			Postal Votes	Total Votes	%
Candidate	Party	Mutur	Seru- wila	Trinco -malee	Postal Votes	Total Votes	%
Ranasinghe Premadasa	UNP	16,283	12,319	8,112	127	36,841	45.70%
Sirimavo Bandaranaike	SLFP	11,087	12,733	5,767	92	29,679	36.81%
Oswin Abeygunasekara	SLPP	4,909	789	8,378	27	14,103	17.49%
Valid Votes		32,276	25,841	22,257	246	80,620	100.00%
Rejected Votes		352	404	565	5	1,326	
Total Polled		32,631	26,245	22,822	251	81,949	
Registered Electors		48,570	47,693	56,026		152,289	
Turnout (%)		67.18%	55.03%	40.73%		53.81%	

=== 1989 parliamentary general election ===
Results of the 9th parliamentary election held on 15 February 1989:

Party	Votes per Polling Division			Postal Votes	Total Votes	%	Seats
Party	Mutur	Seru- wila	Trinco -malee	Postal Votes	Total Votes	%	Seats
Independent (EROS)	7,565	1,456	15,915	303	25,239	24.85%	2
Sri Lanka Freedom Party	8,036	11,695	2,950	285	22,966	22.61%	1
United National Party (CWC, UNP)	7,681	11,481	2,881	407	22,450	22.10%	1
Sri Lanka Muslim Congress	10,804	1,848	5,164	68	17,884	17.61%	0
Tamil United Liberation Front (ENDLF, EPRLF, TELO, TULF)	3,160	2,011	7,325	259	12,755	12.56%	0
Mahajana Eksath Peramuna	63	77	141	3	284	0.28%	0
Valid Votes	37,309	28,568	34,376	1,325	101,578	100.00%	4
Rejected Votes	1,547	1,993	1,299	39	4,878		
Total Polled	38,856	30,561	35,675	1,364	106,456		
Registered Electors	48,260	47,331	55,236	1,462	152,289		
Turnout	80.51%	64.57%	64.59%	93.30%	69.90%		

The following candidates were elected:M. K. D. S. Gunawardena (SLFP), 11,260 preference votes (pv); M. E. H. Maharoof (UNP), 10,000 pv; Sivapragasam Ratnarajah (EROS), 784 pv; and Konamalai Mathavarajah (EROS), 575 pv.

=== 1994 parliamentary general election ===
Results of the 10th parliamentary election held on 16 August 1994:

Party	Votes per Polling Division			Postal Votes	Total Votes	%	Seats
Party	Mutur	Seru- wila	Trinco -malee	Postal Votes	Total Votes	%	Seats
United National Party (CWC, UNP)	13,773	14,556	5,703	954	34,986	29.17%	2
Tamil United Liberation Front	6,817	1,765	18,548	1,250	28,380	23.66%	1
Sri Lanka Muslim Congress	18,677	1,870	5,710	646	26,903	22.43%	1
People's Alliance (SLFP et al.)	856	17,183	5,156	691	23,886	19.91%	0
Tamil Eelam Liberation Organization (EROS, PLOTE, TELO)	651	271	2,736	51	3,709	3.09%	0
Eelam People's Revolutionary Liberation Front	252	188	408	33	881	0.73%	0
Independent Group	200	35	352	21	608	0.51%	0
Sri Lanka Progressive Front (JVP)	86	286	199	18	589	0.49%	0
Valid Votes	41,312	36,154	38,812	3,664	119,942	100.00%	4
Rejected Votes	2,210	2,311	2,110	51	6,682		
Total Polled	43,522	38,465	40,922	3,715	126,624		
Registered Electors	61,949	54,632	67,509		184,090		
Turnout	70.25%	70.41%	60.62%		68.78%		

The following candidates were elected: A. Thangathurai (TULF), 22,409 preference votes (pv); M. N. Abdul Majeed (SLMC), 21,590 pv; M. E. H. Maharoof (UNP), 17,043 pv; and Vithanage Sunil Shantha Ranaweera (UNP), 15,084 pv.

A. Thangathurai (TULF) was murdered on 5 July 1997.

Mohamed Ehuttar Hadjiar Maharoof (UNP) was murdered on 20 July 1997.

=== 1994 presidential election ===
Results of the 3rd presidential election held on 9 November 1994:

Candidate	Party	Votes per Polling Division			Postal Votes	Total Votes	%
Candidate	Party	Mutur	Seru- wila	Trinco -malee	Postal Votes	Total Votes	%
Chandrika Kumaratunga	PA	25,721	20,621	28,900	2,701	77,943	71.62%
Srimathi Dissanayake	UNP	11,209	11,726	3,925	1,146	28,006	25.74%
Hudson Samarasinghe	Ind 2	946	415	697	16	2,074	1.91%
G. A. Nihal	SLPF	120	111	85	8	324	0.30%
Harischandra Wijayatunga	SMBP	74	85	112	8	279	0.26%
A. J. Ranashinge	Ind 1	82	60	51	2	195	0.18%
Valid Votes		38,152	33,018	33,770	3,881	108,821	100.00%
Rejected Votes		495	640	545	46	1,726	
Total Polled		38,647	33,658	34,315	3,927	110,547	
Registered Electors		61,949	54,632	67,509	4,135	184,090	
Turnout (%)		62.39%	61.61%	50.83%	94.97%	60.05%	

=== 1999 presidential election ===
Results of the 4th presidential election held on 21 December 1999:

Candidate	Party	Votes per Polling Division			Postal Votes	Total Votes	%
Candidate	Party	Mutur	Seru- wila	Trinco -malee	Postal Votes	Total Votes	%
Ranil Wickremasinghe	UNP	18,987	14,551	28,061	1,752	63,351	50.25%
Chandrika Kumaratunga	PA	20,908	20,781	13,807	1,195	56,691	44.96%
Nandana Gunathilake	JVP	120	1,515	573	99	2,307	1.83%
W. V. M. Ranjith	Ind 2	274	236	224	1	735	0.58%
Rajiva Wijesinha	Liberal	307	202	201	3	713	0.57%
Abdul Rasool	SLMP	298	73	201	27	599	0.48%
T. Edirisuriya	Ind 1	165	181	130	1	477	0.38%
Vasudeva Nanayakkara	LDA	34	37	304	101	476	0.38%
Kamal Karunadasa	PLSF	108	65	71	1	245	0.19%
Harischandra Wijayatunga	SMBP	44	90	74	10	218	0.17%
Hudson Samarasinghe	Ind 3	41	35	51	1	128	0.10%
A. Dissanayaka	DUNF	18	21	30	3	72	0.06%
A. W. Premawardhana	PFF	20	21	27	1	69	0.05%
Valid Votes		41,324	37,808	43,754	3,195	126,081	100.00%
Rejected Votes		716	586	1,227	113	2,642	
Total Polled		42,040	38,394	44,981	3,308	128,723	
Registered Electors		66,690	57,634	77,484		201,808	
Turnout (%)		63.04%	66.62%	58.05%		63.78%	

=== 2000 parliamentary general election ===
Results of the 11th parliamentary election held on 10 October 2000:

Party	Votes per Polling Division			Postal Votes	Total Votes	%	Seats
Party	Mutur	Seru- wila	Trinco -malee	Postal Votes	Total Votes	%	Seats
People's Alliance (SLFP, SLMC et al.)	21,393	18,517	11,928	1,964	53,860	40.46%	3
United National Party (DWC, NWC, UCPF, UNP)	17,688	14,489	12,861	1,638	46,700	35.08%	1
Tamil United Liberation Front	1,615	944	11,070	459	14,090	10.58%	0
Eelam People's Democratic Party	746	316	3,382	80	4,524	3.40%	0
All Ceylon Tamil Congress	192	105	3,269	182	3,748	2.82%	0
Janatha Vimukthi Peramuna	156	2,056	901	180	3,301	2.48%	0
Independent Group 2	156	37	2,268	160	2,621	1.97%	0
Independent Group 3	609	119	674	32	1,434	1.08%	0
Independent Group 6	236	90	526	20	872	0.65%	0
Tamil Eelam Liberation Organization	36	36	420	6	498	0.37%	0
Citizen's Front	82	46	269	7	404	0.30%	0
Sinhala Heritage	10	172	172	18	372	0.28%	0
Liberal Party	68	33	52	1	154	0.12%	0
Sri Lanka Muslim Party	19	12	120	2	153	0.11%	0
Muslim United Liberation Front	34	26	77	0	137	0.10%	0
Democratic United National Front	34	28	22	1	85	0.06%	0
Sinhalaye Mahasammatha Bhoomiputra Pakshaya	1	16	13	2	32	0.02%	0
Independent Group 4	14	7	8	1	31	0.02%	0
Independent Group 1	8	3	16	3	30	0.02%	0
Independent Group 5	1	10	15	0	26	0.02%	0
National Development Front	4	12	6	0	22	0.02%	0
Ruhuna People's Party	4	4	11	0	19	0.01%	0
People's Freedom Front	4	6	7	0	17	0.01%	0
Valid Votes	43,110	37,084	48,087	4,756	133,130	100.00%	4
Rejected Votes	2,581	2,468	3,385		8,642		
Total Polled	45,691	39,552	51,472		141,772		
Registered Electors	68,329	59,233	79,322		206,884		
Turnout (%)	66.87%	66.77%	64.89%		68.52%		

The following candidates were elected: M. A. M. Maharoof (UNP), 21,438 preference votes (pv); M. N. Abdul Majeed (PA), 18,173 pv; M. S. Thowfeek (PA-SLMC), 15,588 pv; and M. K. D. S. Gunawardena (PA), 15,392 pv.

=== 2001 parliamentary general election ===
Results of the 12th parliamentary election held on 5 December 2001:

Party	Votes per Polling Division			Postal Votes	Displaced Votes	Total Votes	%	Seats
Party	Mutur	Seru- wila	Trinco -malee	Postal Votes	Displaced Votes	Total Votes	%	Seats
United National Front (CWC, SLMC, UNP, WPF)	29,473	16,266	14,560	2,570	61	62,930	39.05%	2
Tamil National Alliance (ACTC, EPRLF(S), TELO, TULF)	14,393	4,796	35,639	1,289	4	56,121	34.83%	1
People's Alliance (NUA, SLFP et al.)	11,199	14,965	5,027	1,745	61	32,997	20.48%	1
Janatha Vimukthi Peramuna	168	3,818	1,664	443	2	6,095	3.78%	0
Eelam People's Democratic Party	124	85	1,209	52	0	1,470	0.91%	0
New Left Front (NSSP et al.)	184	280	136	15	4	619	0.38%	0
Sinhala Heritage	20	139	35	8	0	202	0.13%	0
National Development Front	41	51	71	2	0	165	0.10%	0
Muslim United Liberation Front	32	28	51	2	0	113	0.07%	0
United Sinhala Great Council	44	38	18	0	0	100	0.06%	0
Liberal Party	35	37	23	3	1	99	0.06%	0
Democratic United National Front	28	22	5	1	0	56	0.03%	0
Independent Group 6	15	12	19	1	0	47	0.03%	0
Independent Group 1	16	3	5	0	0	24	0.01%	0
Independent Group 5	6	8	8	0	0	22	0.01%	0
Independent Group 3	7	10	3	0	0	20	0.01%	0
Independent Group 4	3	6	4	0	0	13	0.01%	0
Independent Group 2	5	4	3	0	0	12	0.01%	0
Sri Lanka Muslim Party	2	3	6	0	0	11	0.01%	0
Sri Lanka National Front	1	3	7	0	0	11	0.01%	0
Sri Lanka Progressive Front	5	4	2	0	0	11	0.01%	0
Valid Votes	55,801	40,578	58,495	6,131	133	161,138	100.00%	4
Rejected Votes	2,844	2,142	3,251	185	7	8,429		
Total Polled	58,645	42,720	61,746	6,316	140	169,567		
Registered Electors	70,168	60,690	81,422			212,280		
Turnout (%)	83.58%	70.39%	75.83%			79.88%		

The following candidates were elected: R. Sampanthan (TNA-TULF), 40,110 preference votes (pv); M. A. M. Maharoof (UNF), 25,264 pv; K. M. Thowfeek (UNF-SLMC), 24,847 pv; and M. K. D. S. Gunawardena (PA), 14,938 pv.

=== 2004 parliamentary general election ===
Results of the 13th parliamentary election held on 2 April 2004:

Party	Votes per Polling Division			Postal Votes	Total Votes	%	Seats
Party	Mutur	Seru- wila	Trinco -malee	Postal Votes	Total Votes	%	Seats
Tamil National Alliance (ACTC, EPRLF(S), ITAK, TELO)	17,005	6,178	43,880	1,892	68,955	37.72%	2
Sri Lanka Muslim Congress	45,523	4,647	13,378	1,450	65,187	35.66%	1
United People's Freedom Alliance (JVP, NUA, SLFP et al.)	1,854	19,607	6,229	3,362	31,053	16.99%	1
United National Front (CWC, DPF, UNP)	689	10,346	3,193	1,463	15,693	8.59%	0
Jathika Hela Urumaya	21	563	119	88	791	0.43%	0
Eelam People's Democratic Party	49	61	393	37	540	0.30%	0
United Muslim People's Alliance	50	32	33	2	117	0.06%	0
New Left Front (NSSP et al.)	32	12	35	8	87	0.05%	0
Ruhuna People's Party	53	11	17	0	82	0.04%	0
Sinhalaye Mahasammatha Bhoomiputra Pakshaya	42	12	10	1	65	0.04%	0
Independent Group 1	31	11	16	2	61	0.03%	0
Independent Group 6	30	9	17	2	58	0.03%	0
Independent Group 5	26	14	13	0	53	0.03%	0
Independent Group 3	2	14	6	1	23	0.01%	0
Independent Group 2	14	1	4	0	19	0.01%	0
Independent Group 4	4	2	4	0	10	0.01%	0
Valid Votes	65,425	41,520	67,347	8,308	182,794	100.00%	4
Rejected Votes	3,080	2,424	3,073	273	8,863		
Total Polled	68,505	43,944	70,420	8,581	191,657		
Registered Electors	74,869	63,161	86,277		224,307		
Turnout (%)	91.50%	69.57%	81.62%		85.44%		

The following candidates were elected: R. Sampanthan (TNA-ITAK), 47,735 preference votes (pv); K. Thurairetnasingam (TNA-ITAK), 34,773 pv; M. N. Abdul Majeed (SLMC), 26,948 pv; and Jayantha Wijesekara (UPFA-SLFP), 19,983 pv.

M. N. Abdul Majeed (SLMC) was expelled from the Sri Lanka Muslim Congress on 30 May 2004. He subsequently joined the United People's Freedom Alliance.

=== 2005 presidential election ===
Results of the 5th presidential election held on 17 November 2005:

Candidate	Party	Votes per Polling Division			Postal Votes	Displaced Votes	Total Votes	%
Candidate	Party	Mutur	Seru- wila	Trinco -malee	Postal Votes	Displaced Votes	Total Votes	%
Ranil Wickremasinghe	UNP	29,061	17,835	41,369	3,913	19	92,197	61.33%
Mahinda Rajapaksa	UPFA	18,817	21,353	10,878	4,621	11	55,680	37.04%
Siritunga Jayasuriya	USP	338	142	299	13	0	792	0.53%
A. A. Suraweera	NDF	257	153	138	10	0	558	0.37%
Victor Hettigoda	ULPP	45	56	133	42	0	276	0.18%
A. K. J. Arachchige	DUA	82	35	38	10	0	165	0.11%
Chamil Jayaneththi	NLF	32	50	65	10	0	157	0.10%
Aruna de Soyza	RPP	65	50	37	5	0	157	0.10%
Anura De Silva	ULF	45	29	56	2	0	132	0.09%
Wimal Geeganage	SLNF	16	26	27	2	0	71	0.05%
Wije Dias	SEP	18	14	33	2	0	67	0.04%
P. Nelson Perera	SLPF	22	9	24	1	0	56	0.04%
H.S. Dharmadwaja	UNAF	10	7	9	0	0	26	0.02%
Valid Votes		48,808	39,759	53,106	8,631	30	150,334	100.00%
Rejected Votes		542	406	956	190	0	2,094	
Total Polled		49,350	40,165	54,062	8,821	30	152,428	
Registered Electors		81,534	66,126	91,095			238,755	
Turnout (%)		60.53%	60.74%	59.35%			63.84%	

=== 2008 provincial council election ===
Results of the 1st Eastern provincial council election held on 10 May 2008:

Party	Votes per Polling Division			Postal Votes	Displaced Votes	Total Votes	%	Seats
Party	Mutur	Seru- wila	Trinco -malee	Postal Votes	Displaced Votes	Total Votes	%	Seats
United National Party (SLMC, UNP)	28,233	10,855	28,146	2,481		70,858	51.37%	5
United People's Freedom Alliance (SLFP, TMVP et al.)	18,451	21,915	13,828	4,938		59,298	42.99%	4
Janatha Vimukthi Peramuna	160	2,286	1,408	411		4,266	3.09%	1
United Socialist Party	495	249	537	18		1,309	0.95%	0
Independent Group 18	88	43	323	8		468	0.34%	0
Eelavar Democratic Front (EROS)	124	125	195	13		459	0.33%	0
Akila Ilankai Tamil United Front	25	9	311	33		378	0.27%	0
Independent Group 4	94	10	101	3		209	0.15%	0
People's Front of Liberation Tigers	25	7	117	10		163	0.12%	0
Independent Group 12	8	13	91	6		118	0.09%	0
National Development Front	16	41	22	9		89	0.06%	0
Independent Group 5	20	8	28	2		58	0.04%	0
Independent Group 19	8	19	14	0		43	0.03%	0
Independent Group 17	8	8	7	1		24	0.02%	0
Independent Group 11	4	6	8	2		20	0.01%	0
Independent Group 1	6	5	5	2		18	0.01%	0
Independent Group 6	3	4	7	1		15	0.01%	0
Independent Group 2	1	8	2	3		14	0.01%	0
Independent Group 8	2	1	11	0		14	0.01%	0
Independent Group 3	4	3	6	0		13	0.01%	0
Sinhalaye Mahasammatha Bhoomiputra Pakshaya	1	7	2	2		13	0.01%	0
Independent Group 7	2	5	5	0		12	0.01%	0
Independent Group 10	2	2	5	0		11	0.01%	0
Independent Group 15	3	3	4	0		10	0.01%	0
Sri Lanka Progressive Front	1	4	4	0		9	0.01%	0
Sri Lanka National Front	0	5	4	0		9	0.01%	0
Independent Group 13	2	3	3	0		8	0.01%	0
Independent Group 9	0	2	5	0		7	0.01%	0
Independent Group 16	1	1	4	0		6	0.00%	0
Ruhuna People's Party	0	2	3	0		5	0.00%	0
Independent Group 14	1	1	2	0		5	0.00%	0
Valid Votes	47,788	35,650	45,208	7,943		137,929	100.00%	10
Rejected Votes	3,779	3,185	5,020	411		12,695		
Total Polled	51,567	38,835	50,228	8,354		150,624		
Registered Electors	84,175	66,690	91,598			242,463		
Turnout	61.26%	58.23%	54.84%			62.12%		

The following candidates were elected: Ajju Mohamed Mohamed Faiz (UPFA); Ariyawathi W. G. M. Galappaththi (UPFA); Rauff Hakeem (UNP-SLMC); M. K. D. S. Gunawardena (UPFA); M. A. M. Maharoof (UNP); Sathak Lebbe Muhammadu Hasan Moulavi (UPFA); Arunasalam Parasuraman (UNP); K. G. Wimal Piyathissa (JVP); M. S. Thowfeek (UNP-SLMC); and Rathna Sabapathi Nawarathnarajah Varathan (UNP).

=== 2010 presidential election ===
Results of the 6th presidential election held on 26 January 2010:

Candidate	Party	Votes per Polling Division			Postal Votes	Displaced Votes	Total Votes	%
Candidate	Party	Mutur	Seru- wila	Trinco -malee	Postal Votes	Displaced Votes	Total Votes	%
Sarath Fonseka	NDF	32,631	15,260	35,887	3,798	85	87,661	54.09%
Mahinda Rajapaksa	UPFA	21,002	27,932	13,935	6,882	1	69,752	43.04%
M. C. M. Ismail	DUNF	384	262	445	23	1	1,115	0.69%
C. J. Sugathsiri Gamage	UDF	252	121	384	8	0	765	0.47%
W. V. Mahiman Ranjith	Ind 1	131	133	74	8	0	346	0.21%
A. A. Suraweera	NDF	110	100	83	18	0	311	0.19%
M. K. Shivajilingam	Ind 5	52	32	193	25	0	302	0.19%
Sarath Manamendra	NSH	117	63	69	3	0	252	0.16%
Siritunga Jayasuriya	USP	94	54	95	4	0	247	0.15%
Lal Perera	ONF	98	42	98	2	0	240	0.15%
A. S. P Liyanage	SLLP	65	66	83	4	0	218	0.13%
Ukkubanda Wijekoon	Ind 3	58	51	35	3	0	147	0.09%
Vikramabahu Karunaratne	LF	32	29	60	4	0	125	0.08%
Aithurus M. Illias	Ind 2	43	14	44	4	0	105	0.06%
Sanath Pinnaduwa	NA	33	21	28	0	0	82	0.05%
Wije Dias	SEP	30	19	30	1	0	80	0.05%
M. Mohamed Musthaffa	Ind 4	31	13	27	5	0	76	0.05%
Aruna de Soyza	RPP	15	19	24	0	0	58	0.04%
Sarath Kongahage	UNAF	11	9	31	4	0	55	0.03%
Senaratna de Silva	PNF	11	13	24	0	0	48	0.03%
M. B. Thaminimulla	ACAKO	11	6	27	1	0	45	0.03%
Battaramulla Seelarathana	JP	8	10	22	2	0	42	0.03%
Valid Votes		55,219	44,269	51,698	10,799	87	162,072	100.00%
Rejected Votes		696	563	1,050	120	3	2,432	
Total Polled		55,915	44,832	52,748	10,919	90	164,504	
Registered Electors		85,401	69,047	86,685			241,133	
Turnout		65.47%	64.93%	60.85%			68.22%	

=== 2010 parliamentary general election ===
Results of the 14th parliamentary election held on 8 April 2010:

Party	Votes per Polling Division			Postal Votes	Displaced Votes	Total Votes	%	Seats
Party	Mutur	Seru- wila	Trinco -malee	Postal Votes	Displaced Votes	Total Votes	%	Seats
United People's Freedom Alliance (ACMC, NC, SLFP et al.)	18,576	22,756	10,961	7,487	4	59,784	42.78%	2
United National Front (DPF, SLFP(P), SLMC, UNP)	21,963	6,936	8,718	2,074	0	39,691	28.40%	1
Tamil National Alliance (EPRLF(S), ITAK, TELO)	8,068	3,297	20,578	1,306	19	33,268	23.81%	1
Democratic National Alliance (JVP et al.)	180	1,460	522	357	0	2,519	1.80%	0
Tamil Makkal Viduthalai Pulikal	302	262	1,106	42	0	1,712	1.23%	0
Tamil National People's Front (ACTC et al.)	161	39	956	26	0	1,182	0.85%	0
Eelam People's Revolutionary Liberation Front (Padmanaba)	9	51	205	14	0	279	0.20%	0
Sri Lanka National Front	12	140	6	12	0	170	0.12%	0
United Socialist Party	96	20	32	2	0	150	0.11%	0
National Development Front	22	48	29	10	0	109	0.08%	0
Independent Group 11	82	9	5	5	0	101	0.07%	0
Independent Group 7	21	30	41	6	0	98	0.07%	0
All Lanka Tamil United Front	10	16	54	5	0	85	0.06%	0
United National Alternative Front	31	14	27	4	0	76	0.05%	0
Independent Group 14	16	28	17	1	0	62	0.04%	0
Independent Group 3	7	7	40	1	0	55	0.04%	0
Independent Group 6	12	20	8	1	0	41	0.03%	0
Independent Group 13	10	21	7	1	0	39	0.03%	0
Independent Group 12	20	1	17	0	0	38	0.03%	0
Independent Group 5	4	8	23	0	0	35	0.03%	0
Independent Group 1	10	9	8	6	0	33	0.02%	0
Independent Group 10	9	4	20	0	0	33	0.02%	0
Left Liberation Front (LLF, TNLA)	0	0	29	2	0	31	0.02%	0
Muslim Liberation Front	21	2	4	1	0	28	0.02%	0
United Democratic Front	13	8	5	1	0	27	0.02%	0
Janasetha Peramuna	5	1	16	1	0	23	0.02%	0
Independent Group 4	7	2	8	2	0	19	0.01%	0
Independent Group 9	3	8	5	0	0	16	0.01%	0
Independent Group 2	2	8	4	1	0	15	0.01%	0
Sinhalaye Mahasammatha Bhoomiputra Pakshaya	5	5	2	2	0	14	0.01%	0
Independent Group 8	4	3	1	1	0	9	0.01%	0
Valid Votes	49,681	35,213	43,454	11,371	23	139,742	100.00%	4
Rejected Votes	3,246	2,854	3,483	653	4	10,240		
Total Polled	52,927	38,067	46,937	12,024	27	149,982		
Registered Electors	85,401	69,047	86,685			241,133		
Turnout	61.97%	55.13%	54.15%			62.20%		

The following candidates were elected: R. Sampanthan (TNA-ITAK), 24,488 preference votes (pv); M. S. Thowfeek (UNF-SLMC), 23,588 pv; Susantha Punchinilame (UPFA), 22,820 pv; and M. K. D. S. Gunawardena (UPFA), 19,734 pv.

=== 2012 provincial council election ===
Results of the 2nd Eastern provincial council election held on 8 September 2012:

Party	Votes per Polling Division			Postal Votes	Total Votes	%	Seats
Party	Mutur	Seru- wila	Trinco -malee	Postal Votes	Total Votes	%	Seats
Tamil National Alliance (EPRLF (S), ITAK, PLOTE, TELO, TULF)	10,213	5,014	28,067	1,102	44,396	29.08%	3
United People's Freedom Alliance (ACMC, NC, SLFP, TMVP et al.)	13,011	17,785	7,949	4,579	43,324	28.38%	3
Sri Lanka Muslim Congress	14,617	2,390	8,642	527	26,176	17.15%	2
United National Party	12,318	7,148	2,979	1,994	24,439	16.01%	1
National Freedom Front	490	6,450	1,527	1,055	9,522	6.24%	1
Independent Group 10	1,350	55	155	82	1,642	1.08%	0
Janatha Vimukthi Peramuna	21	518	141	97	777	0.51%	0
Socialist Alliance (CPSL, DLF, LSSP)	400	38	162	12	612	0.40%	0
Eelavar Democratic Front (EROS)	168	117	93	7	385	0.25%	0
Akila Ilankai Tamil United Front	38	79	259	8	384	0.25%	0
United Socialist Party	75	37	32	5	149	0.10%	0
Independent Group 8	75	26	11	9	121	0.08%	0
Sri Lanka Labour Party	14	6	86	1	107	0.07%	0
United Lanka Great Council	22	13	58	4	97	0.06%	0
Independent Group 16	23	36	22	8	89	0.06%	0
Independent Group 6	9	56	12	4	81	0.05%	0
Patriotic National Front	48	15	11	4	78	0.05%	0
Independent Group 3	4	9	22	1	36	0.02%	0
Jana Setha Peramuna	2	18	1	14	35	0.02%	0
Independent Group 12	18	6	6	3	33	0.02%	0
Independent Group 1	6	9	13	2	30	0.02%	0
Independent Group 9	6	4	17	2	29	0.02%	0
Independent Group 4	11	3	5	1	20	0.01%	0
Independent Group 7	2	11	5	2	20	0.01%	0
Independent Group 5	7	6	3	0	16	0.01%	0
Muslim Liberation Front	6	5	3	1	15	0.01%	0
Independent Group 14	6	2	5	1	14	0.01%	0
Independent Group 11	3	6	2	1	12	0.01%	0
Independent Group 2	1	8	1	2	12	0.01%	0
Independent Group 13	2	1	2	0	5	0.00%	0
Independent Group 15	1	3	0	0	4	0.00%	0
Ruhuna People's Party	0	1	1	1	3	0.00%	0
Valid Votes	52,967	39,875	50,292	9,529	152,663	100.00%	10
Rejected Votes	3,032	2,979	4,563	750	11,324		
Total Polled	55,999	42,854	54,855	10,279	163,987		
Registered Electors	89,370	70,141	85,852		245,363		
Turnout	62.66%	61.10%	63.89%		66.83%		

The following candidates were elected: S. Thandayuthapani (TNA-ITAK), 20,854 preference votes (pv); Ariyawathy Galappaththy (UPFA), 14,224 pv; Kekunawela Pathiranage Priyantha Prema Kumara (UPFA), 12,393 pv; M. N. Abdul Majeed (UPFA-SLFP), 11,726 pv; Kumaraswamy Nageswaran (TNA-ITAK), 10,911 pv; Anver Ramlan Mohamed (SLMC), 10,904 pv; Asan Sathak Lebbe Mohamed Moulavi (SLMC), 10,732 pv; Jegatheesan Janarthanan (TNA-ITAK), 8,949 pv; and Naketh Gedara Wijesekara Mudiyanselage Jayantha Wijesekara (NFF), 7,303 pv.
