= M. A. M. Maharoof =

Sri Lankan politician

Hon. M. A. M. Maharoof MP MPC

Member of Parliament for Trincomalee District
- Incumbent
- Assumed office 17 August 2015
- In office 5 December 2000 – 7 February 2004

Member of the Eastern Provincial Council for Trincomalee District
- In office 2008–2012

Personal details
- Born: 25 April 1957 (age 69)
- Party: All Ceylon Makkal Congress
- Other political affiliations: United National Front for Good Governance

Mohamed Abdullah Mohamed Maharoof (born 25 April 1957; also known as Sinna Maharoof) is a Sri Lankan politician and Member of Parliament.

== Early life ==
Maharoof was born on 25 April 1957. He is a cousin of Imran Maharoof, Member of Parliament.

== Career ==
Maharoof contested the 2000 parliamentary election as one of the United National Party's (UNP) candidates in Trincomalee District and was first elected to Parliament. He was re-elected at the 2001 parliamentary election as a United National Front (UNF) candidate. He contested the 2004 parliamentary election as a Sri Lanka Muslim Congress (SLMC) candidate but failed to get re-elected, coming fourth amongst the SLMC candidates.

Maharoof contested the 2008 provincial council election as one of the UNF's candidates in Trincomalee District and was elected to the Eastern Provincial Council. He contested the 2012 provincial council election as a UNP candidate but failed to get re-elected after coming second amongst the UNP candidates.

Maharoof was one of the United National Front for Good Governance's candidates in Trincomalee District at the 2015 parliamentary election and was elected to Parliament.

== Electoral history ==
Electoral history of M. A. M. Maharoof
Election	Constituency	Party	Votes	Result
2000 parliamentary	Trincomalee District	UNP	21,348	Elected
2001 parliamentary	Trincomalee District	UNF	25,264	Elected
2004 parliamentary	Trincomalee District	SLMC	16,617	Not elected
2008 provincial	Trincomalee District	UNF		Elected
2012 provincial	Trincomalee District	UNP	9,827	Not elected
2015 parliamentary	Trincomalee District	UNFGG	35,456	Elected
