= Jayantha Wijesekara =

Sri Lankan politician

Hon. Jayantha Wijesekara MP

Member of Parliament for Trincomalee District
- In office 2004–2010

Personal details
- Party: Sri Lanka Freedom Party
- Other political affiliations: United People's Freedom Alliance

N. W. M. Jayantha Wijesekara is a Sri Lankan politician and former member of the Parliament of Sri Lanka.
