= Sivapragasam Ratnarajah =

Sri Lankan politician (1952–2008)

Hon. Sivapragasam Ratnarajah MP

Member of Parliament for Trincomalee
- In office 1989–1994

Personal details
- Born: 25 March 1952 Trincomalee, Dominion of Ceylon
- Died: 18 December 2008 (aged 56) Trincomalee, Sri Lanka
- Party: Eelam Revolutionary Organisation of Students

Sivapragasam Ratnarajah was a Sri Lankan Tamil politician and a Member of Parliament belonging to the Eelam Revolutionary Organisation of Students.He was elected from the Trincomalee Electoral District in 1989. He was graduate from Colombo University.
