= K. M. Thowfeek =

Sri Lankan politician and former Member of Parliament

Hon. K. M. Thowfeek MP

Member of Parliament for Trincomalee District
- In office 2001–2004

Personal details
- Born: 4 April 1958 (age 68)
- Party: United People's Freedom Alliance

Kabeeb Mohamed Thowfeek (born 4 April 1958; also known as Thideer Thowfeek) is a Sri Lankan politician and former Member of Parliament.

== Early life and family ==
Thowfeek was born on 4 April 1958. He is the brother of M. S. Thowfeek.

== Career ==
Thowfeek contested the 2001 parliamentary election as one of the United National Front's (UNF) candidates in Trincomalee District. He was elected and entered Parliament. He contested the 2004 parliamentary election as a Sri Lanka Muslim Congress (SLMC) candidate in Trincomalee District but failed to get re-elected after coming fifth amongst the SLMC candidates.

Thowfeek contested the 2006 local government election as an independent group candidate and was elected to Muttur Divisional Council, becoming its chairman. Thowfeek contested the 2008 provincial council election as one of the United People's Freedom Alliance's (UPFA) candidates in Trincomalee District but failed to get elected to the Eastern Provincial Council.

Thowfeek contested the 2010 parliamentary election as one of the UPFA's candidates in Trincomalee District but failed to get elected after coming sixth amongst the UPFA candidates.

== Electoral history ==
Electoral history of K. M. Thowfeek
Election	Constituency	Party	Votes	Result
2001 parliamentary	Trincomalee District	UNF	24,847	Elected
2004 parliamentary	Trincomalee District	SLMC	16,599	Not elected
2006 local	Muttur DC	Ind		Elected
2008 provincial	Trincomalee District	UPFA		Not elected
2010 parliamentary	Trincomalee District	UPFA	5,096	Not elected
