= A. R. A. Hafeez =

Sri Lankan politician

A. R. A. Hafeez Hon.

Member of Parliament for National List
- In office 2015 – 19 January 2016
- Succeeded by: M. S. Thowfeek

Personal details
- Born: 22 April 1952 (age 74)
- Party: Sri Lanka Muslim Congress
- Other political affiliations: United National Front for Good Governance
- Profession: Physician

Abdul Rauff Abdul Hafeez (born 22 April 1952) is a Sri Lankan politician and former Member of Parliament.

== Early life and family ==
Hafeez was born on 22 April 1952 and is a medical doctor. He is the brother of Rauff Hakeem, leader of the Sri Lanka Muslim Congress (SLMC).

== Career ==
Hafeez is media secretary of the SLMC. He was a media consultant to the Ministry of Ports and Shipping whilst his brother was Minister of Ports and Shipping. He was Media Secretary to the Ministry of Justice whilst his brother was Minister of Justice.

Hafeez was appointed as a United National Front for Good Governance National List MP in the Sri Lankan Parliament following the 2015 parliamentary election. Hafeez resigned from Parliament on 19 January 2016.
