= Imran Maharoof =

Sri Lankan politician

Hon. Imran Maharoof MP
- இம்ரான் மகரூப் ඉම්රාන් මකරප්

Member of the Parliament of Sri Lanka
- Incumbent
- Assumed office 2015
- Constituency: Trincomalee District

Member of the Eastern Provincial Council
- In office 2012–2015
- Constituency: Trincomalee District

Personal details
- Born: 17 September 1983 (age 42)
- Party: United National Party
- Other political affiliations: Samagi Jana Balawegaya
- Website: imranmaharoof.com

Imran Maharoof (Tamil: இம்ரான் மகரூப், romanized: Imrāṉ Makarūp; born 1 September 1983) is a Sri Lankan politician, former provincial councillor and Member of Parliament.

== Early life ==
Maharoof was born on 1 September 1983. He is the son of M. E. H. Maharoof and cousin of M. A. M. Maharoof (Sinna Maharoof), both of whom were former members of parliament. He was educated at Royal College, Colombo and holds a diploma in management and banking.

== Career ==
Maharoof contested the 2010 parliamentary election as one of the United National Front (UNF) electoral alliance's candidates in Trincomalee District but failed to get elected, coming 2nd amongst the UNF candidates. He contested the 2012 provincial council election as one of the United National Party's candidates in Trincomalee District and was elected to the Eastern Provincial Council.

Maharoof the 2015 parliamentary election as one of the United National Front for Good Governance electoral alliance's candidates in Trincomalee District and was elected to the Parliament of Sri Lanka. He was re-elected at the 2020 parliamentary election.

== Electoral history ==
Electoral history of Imran Maharoof
Election	Constituency	Party	Alliance	Votes	Result
2010 parliamentary	Trincomalee District	United National Party	United National Front	19,665	Not elected
2012 provincial	Trincomalee District	United National Party		10,048	Elected
2015 parliamentary	Trincomalee District	United National Party	United National Front for Good Governance	32,582	Elected
2020 parliamentary	Trincomalee District	United National Party	Samagi Jana Balawegaya	39,029	Elected
