= Manmunai Bridge =

Manmunai Bridge மண்முனைப் பாலம்
- Coordinates: 7°38′16.84″N 81°43′47.79″E
- Carries: Motor vehicles
- Crosses: Batticaloa Lagoon
- Locale: Batticaloa, Batticaloa District
- Owner: Ministry of Ports & Highways
- Maintained by: Road Development Authority

Characteristics
- Material: Cement
- Total length: 210 m (689 ft)
- Width: 9.8 m (32 ft)

History
- Construction start: 2012
- Construction end: 2014
- Construction cost: Rs. 1,736 million
- Inaugurated: 19 April 2014

Manmunai Bridge (Tamil: மண்முனைப் பாலம்) is a road bridge in Batticaloa District, Sri Lanka. It crosses the Batticaloa Lagoon and connects Western and Eastern shore of the Batticaloa lagoon.

The bridge became the first east–west land connection between Batticaloa coastal belt and mainland. It reduced previous 30 km road access from other side and gives alternative road access to and from Batticaloa town to other areas of west bank of Batticaloa and Ampara District. Earlier, transport between the west and east banks was carried out by a small ferry through Batticaloa Lagoon.

Japan International Cooperation Agency granted 1,206 million Japanese Yen to Sri Lankan government to construct the bridge along with causeway as mark of 60 years of diplomatic relations between Sri Lanka and Japan.
