= M. S. Thowfeek =

Sri Lankan politician

Hon. M. S. Thowfeek MP
- எம். எஸ். தௌஃபீக் මොහොමඩ් ෂරීෆ් තවුෆික්

Deputy Minister of Internal Transport
- In office 21 January 2015 – 17 August 2015

Member of the Parliament of Sri Lanka
- Incumbent
- Assumed office 2020
- Constituency: Trincomalee District
- In office 2016–2020
- Preceded by: A. R. A. Hafeez
- Constituency: National List
- In office 2010–2015
- Constituency: Trincomalee District
- In office 2001–2004
- Constituency: National List
- In office 2000–2001
- Constituency: Trincomalee District

Member of the Eastern Provincial Council
- In office 2008–2010
- Succeeded by: A. R. Mohamed
- Constituency: Trincomalee District

Personal details
- Born: Mohamed Shariff Thowfeek; 7 January 1971 (age 55)
- Party: Sri Lanka Muslim Congress
- Other political affiliations: Samagi Jana Balawegaya

Mohamed Shariff Thowfeek (Tamil: முகம்மது சரிப் தௌஃபீக், romanized: Mukam'matu Carip Tauḥpīk; born 7 January 1971) is a Sri Lankan politician, former provincial councillor, former deputy minister and Member of Parliament.

== Early life and family ==
Thowfeek was born on 7 January 1971. He is the brother of former MP K. M. Thowfeek.

== Career ==
Thowfeek contested the 2000 parliamentary election as one of the People's Alliance (PA) electoral alliance's candidates in Trincomalee District and was elected to the Parliament. The alliance between the Sri Lanka Muslim Congress (SLMC) and PA crumbled in June 2001 and in October 2001 the SLMC joined the opposition United National Front (UNF).

Thowfeek contested the 2001 parliamentary election as one of the UNF's candidates in Trincomalee District but failed to get re-elected. However, after the election he was appointed to the Parliament as a National List MP representing the UNF. He contested the 2004 parliamentary election as a SLMC candidate in Trincomalee District but failed to get re-elected after coming 3rd amongst the SLMC candidates.

Thowfeek contested the 2008 provincial council election as one of the UNF's candidates in Trincomalee District and was elected to the Eastern Provincial Council. He contested the 2010 parliamentary election as one of the UNF's candidates in Trincomalee District and was re-elected. Following the 2015 presidential election and the change in government Thowfeek was appointed Deputy Minister of Internal Transport in January 2015.

Thowfeek contested the 2015 parliamentary election as one of the United National Front for Good Governance (UNFGG) electoral alliance's candidates in Trincomalee District but failed to get re-elected. However, following the resignation of A. R. A. Hafeez in January 2016 he was appointed to the Parliament as a National List MP representing the UNFGG. He contested the 2020 parliamentary election as a Samagi Jana Balawegaya electoral alliance candidate in Trincomalee District and was re-elected.

== Electoral history ==
Electoral history of M. S. Thowfeek
Election	Constituency	Party	Alliance	Votes	Result
2000 parliamentary	Trincomalee District	Sri Lanka Muslim Congress	People's Alliance	15,588	Elected
2001 parliamentary	Trincomalee District	Sri Lanka Muslim Congress	United National Front		Not elected
2004 parliamentary	Trincomalee District	Sri Lanka Muslim Congress		21,465	Not elected
2008 provincial	Trincomalee District	Sri Lanka Muslim Congress	United National Front		Elected
2010 parliamentary	Trincomalee District	Sri Lanka Muslim Congress	United National Front	23,588	Elected
2015 parliamentary	Trincomalee District	Sri Lanka Muslim Congress	United National Front for Good Governance		Not elected
2020 parliamentary	Trincomalee District	Sri Lanka Muslim Congress	Samagi Jana Balawegaya	43,759	Elected
