= Arun Hemachandra =

Sri Lankan politician

Hon. Arun Hemachandra Deputy Minister of Foreign Affairs

Member of Parliament for Trincomalee Electoral District
- Incumbent
- Assumed office 15 November 2024

Personal details
- Born: 19 July 1991 (age 35)
- Party: National People's Power
- Profession: Politician

Arun Hemachandra is a Sri Lankan Socialist politician. He is the Deputy Minister of Foreign Affairs and Foreign Employment, having been elected to the Sri Lankan Parliament from Trincomalee Electoral District as a member of the National People's Power. Hemachandra is an executive committee member of the National People's Power and a full time member of the Janatha Vimukthi Peramuna.
