= Roshan Akmeemana =

Sri Lankan politician

Hon. Roshan Akmeemana MP

Member of Parliament for Trincomalee Electoral District
- Incumbent
- Assumed office 15 November 2024

Personal details
- Party: National People's Power
- Profession: Politician

Roshan Akmeemana is a Sri Lankan teacher and politician. He was elected to the Sri Lankan Parliament from Trincomalee Electoral District as a member of the National People's Power.
