= Upaar Lagoon =

- Location within Sri Lanka
- Location: Batticaloa District, Sri Lanka
- Coordinates: 8°07′N 81°24′E
- Type: Lagoon
- Primary outflows: Indian Ocean
- Surface area: 25.9 square kilometres (10.0 sq mi)
- Max. depth: 2 metres (6.6 ft)
- Surface elevation: Sea level

Upaar Lagoon is an estuarine lagoon in Batticaloa District, eastern Sri Lanka.

The lagoon is fed by a number of small rivers. It is linked to the sea by a narrow channel to the south.

The lagoon is surrounded by evergreen forest and scrubland. The land is used for subsistence fishing and some rice cultivation.

The lagoon has extensive mangrove swamps and some sea grass beds. The lagoon attracts a wide variety of water birds.
