= List of Archaeological Protected Monuments in Kalutara District =

This is a list of Archaeological Protected Monuments in Kalutara District, Sri Lanka.

Monument	Image	Location	Grama Niladhari Division	Divisional Secretary's Division	Registered	Description	Refs
Beruwala Lighthouse		Maradana	No. 754, Maradana	Beruwala	25 March 2016		
Bulathwathu Kanda ruins		Halwala Kanda	Halwala	Bulathsinhala	6 July 2007	Place with the remains of building foundation pits on the rock surface in the mountain called Bulathwathukanda	
Daladawaththa Purana Vihara		Talpitiya	Talpitiya-South (GND No. 697)	Panadura	27 December 2013	Image house and preaching hall (Darmashalawa)	
Devamittarama Purana Vihara			No. 821 - Bulathsinhala South	Bulathsinhala	23 January 2009	Buddhist shrine	
Dhammikarama Purana Vihara		Moragalla	Moragalla	Beruwala	12 June 2015	Shrine with paintings	
Gallen Raja Maha Vihara		Warakagoda		Madurawela	22 November 2002	Cave and Devala chamber	
Ganegodella Purana Raja Maha Vihara		Kithulgoda	No. 833A, Kithulgoda North	Agalawatta	12 June 2015	Shrine and other archaeological remains	
Ganeuda Vihara		Warakagoda		Madurawela	16 June 1994	Stone pillars	
Ganeuda Purana Vihara		Warakagoda	Warakagoda (GND No. 816)	Madurawela	17 May 2013	A stone flight of steps located in the territory	
Ganeudawaththa ruins			No. 816, Warakagoda East	Madurawela	15 April 2016	Access road with flight of steps and rocks with letters and other archeological signs found by both side of the road within the land called Ganeudawaththa adjoining the Warakagoda Ganeuda Purana Raja Maha Vihara	
Ganewatta Purana Vihara		Waskadubedda, Deldoova		Kalutara	24 April 1986		
Gangatilake Devalaya		Kalutara, North	No. 717 Kalutara, North	Kalutara	6 June 2008	The building known as Gangathilaka Temple situated in Kovila watta site	
Horana Raja Maha Vihara		Horana		Horana	16 February 1968	Stone carvings	
Kalyanarama Purana Vihara		Kaluwamodara		Beruwala	8 July 2005	Building with the marble statue	
Kande Vihara		Kaluwamodara	Kaluwamodara	Beruwala	12 June 2015	Octagon shape building with paintings	
Ketchchimalai Mosque		Paranakade	No. 753, Paranakade	Beruwala	12 June 2015	Mosque building	
Keselhenawa Purana Vihara		Eudugoda	No. 648B Hallan Kanda	Madurawela	23 February 2007	Image house	
Medikanda rock cave			Edduragala	Ingiriya	23 January 2009	Medikanda rock cave together with evidence of prehistory	
Nigrodharama Vihara		Kalutara, North	No. 717-D-Kalutara North	Kalutara	6 June 2008	Buddha shrine with frescoes	
Official residence of high court judge		Kalutara, South		Kalutara	8 July 2005		
Palatota ammunition store			No. 723E Palatota	Kalutara	23 February 2007		
Paragasthota Sri Sudharsanarama Vihara			No. 844 - B Dickhena	Millaniya	23 January 2009	The Buddhist shrine and Discourse Hall	
Parama Chethiyarama Vihara		Magalkanda		Beruwala	8 July 2005	Devalaya with paintings	
Pathaha watta ruins		Raigama		Bandaragama	16 February 1968	Stone carvings and Pathaha pond	
Pawrekanda Purana Vihara		Halwala Kanda	Halwala	Agalawatta	6 July 2007	Image house	
Payagala Moola Maha Vihara		Payagala		Beruwala	8 July 2005	Dwelling house, preaching hall and tomb of Ambagahawatta Thera	
Payagala Police Station		Kudapayagala	Kudapayagala	Beruwala	25 March 2016	Police Station buildings	
Payagala Swarnarama Vihara			No. 732, Matiyamulla	Beruwala	9 September 2011	Image house	
Pokunuwita Raja Maha Vihara		Pokunuwita		Horana	12 May 1960	Pokunuwita Rock with inscription	
Purana Kande Vihara		Gorakana South		Panadura	8 July 2005	Vahalkada, Pohoya house, preaching hall, dwelling house, image house, stupa	
Prathiraja Piriven Vihara		Agalawatta		Agalawatta	22 November 2002	Tempita Vihara	
Pulinatalarama Vihara		Kalutara, North		Kalutara	22 November 2002	Buddhist shrine	
Rambukkana Raja Maha Vihara		Rambukkana		Bandaragama	24 May 1968	Two old stone seats and other remnants	
Rankoth Vihara		Panadura	No. 686-B-Pattiya South	Panadura	6 June 2008	Buddhist shrine	
Sapugoda Sri Maha Vihara		Massala		Beruwala	8 July 2005	Image house	
Sri Damma Rakkhitharama Purana Vihara		Wauwulugala	No. 653A Labugama	Millaniya	23 February 2007	Image house with paintings	
Sri Dharmaguptha Pirivena		Mahagammedda	Mahagammedda	Beruwala	12 June 2015	Shrine with paintings	
Sri Vishnu Pattini Devalaya		Kudaligama	No. 817 A Kudaligama	Bulathsinhala	18 August 2006	North slope of the Bulathwathu Kanda	
St. Anne's Catholic Church		Polkotuwa	Polkotuwa	Beruwala	12 June 2015	Church building	
St. Francis Church		Maggona	Diyalagoda	Beruwala	12 June 2015	Church building	
St. Francis Xaviour Church		Payagala	Mahapayagala	Beruwala	12 June 2015	Church building	
St. Mary's Church		Aluthgama	Aluthgama East	Beruwala	12 June 2015	Church building	
St. Mary's Church		Maggona	No. 742, Maggona	Beruwala	12 June 2015	Church building	
St. Sebastian Church		Diyalagoda	No. 741, Diyalagoda	Beruwala	12 June 2015	Church building	
St. Vicenthi Home (Susinodaya building)		Kapugoda	Kapugoda	Beruwala	12 June 2015		
Subuthi Vihara		Waskaduwa		Kalutara	22 November 2002	Birth Place of Subuthi Thero and Seema Malakaya	
Sumanarama Maha Vihara		Aethagama		Kalutara	8 July 2005	Buddhist shrine	
Sunandarama Vihara, Ovitigala		Ovitigala		Mathugama	1 November 1996	Image house with paintings and sculptures	
Uggalboda Vihara		Uggalboda		Kalutara	22 November 2002		
Veherakanda Purana Vihara		Pothuwila		Beruwala	8 July 2005	Image house, ponds, meditation chamber and the Stupa	
Veherawatta Vihara			No. 633 Veherawatta	Kalutara	22 November 2002	Buddhist shrine and rock with symbols	
Vivekarama Vihara, Korosdoova		Korosdoova		Kalutara	22 November 2002	Image house with paintings	
Vivekarama Vihara, Wadduwa		Wadduwa		Kalutara	22 November 2002	Buddhist shrine	
Warakagoda ruins		Warakagoda	No. 816B, Warakagoda North	Madurawela	12 June 2015	Drip-ledged cave situated adjoining Warakagoda Gallena Purana Rajamaha Vihara	
Warakagoda weheragodellawatta site			No. 816-Warakagoda West	Madurawela	6 June 2008	Chaitya	
Weediya Bandara palace ruins		Pelenda		Agalawatta	16 July 1948	Imbulgahawatte, Godellawatte and Pitkattiya land	
Weediyagoda Raja Maha Vihara		Weediyagoda		Bandaragama	22 November 2002	Pattini Devala, Natha Devala and Ritta Geya at main Street	
