= Godigamuwa West (Horana) Grama Niladhari Division =

Godigamuwa West
- Grama Niladhari Division
- Interactive map of Godigamuwa West
- Coordinates: 6.749610°N 79.992653°E
- Country: Sri Lanka
- Province: Western Province
- District: Kalutara District
- Divisional Secretariat: Horana Divisional Secretariat
- Electoral District: Kalutara Electoral District
- Polling Division: Horana Polling Division

Area
  - Total: 1.36 km^{2} (0.53 sq mi)
- Elevation: 44 m (144 ft)

Population (2012)
  - Total: 1,739
  - Density: 1,279/km^{2} (3,310/sq mi)
- ISO 3166 code: LK-1309070

Godigamuwa West

Godigamuwa West Grama Niladhari Division is a Grama Niladhari Division of the Horana Divisional Secretariat of Kalutara District of Western Province, Sri Lanka. It has Grama Niladhari Division Code 606.

Godigamuwa West is a surrounded by the Halapitiya, Walgama North, Rerukana, Samaranayakapura and Godigamuwa East Grama Niladhari Divisions.

== Demographics ==
=== Ethnicity ===
The Godigamuwa West Grama Niladhari Division has a Sinhalese majority (99.2%). In comparison, the Horana Divisional Secretariat (which contains the Godigamuwa West Grama Niladhari Division) has a Sinhalese majority (97.9%)

Ethnicity in Godigamuwa West
1. Sinhalese (99.2%)
2. Other (0.80%)

=== Religion ===
The Godigamuwa West Grama Niladhari Division has a Buddhist majority (97.4%). In comparison, the Horana Divisional Secretariat (which contains the Godigamuwa West Grama Niladhari Division) has a Buddhist majority (97.0%)

Religion in Godigamuwa West
1. Buddhist (97.4%)
2. Roman Catholic (2.00%)
3. Other (0.60%)
