= Ambalanduwa Grama Niladhari Division =

Ambalanduwa
- Grama Niladhari Division
- Interactive map of Ambalanduwa
- Coordinates: 6.740603°N 79.919395°E
- Country: Sri Lanka
- Province: Western Province
- District: Kalutara District
- Divisional Secretariat: Panadura Divisional Secretariat
- Electoral District: Kalutara Electoral District
- Polling Division: Panadura Polling Division

Area
  - Total: 0.66 km^{2} (0.25 sq mi)
- Elevation: 2 m (6.6 ft)

Population (2012)
  - Total: 3,574
  - Density: 5,415/km^{2} (14,020/sq mi)
- ISO 3166 code: LK-1303100

Ambalanduwa

Ambalanduwa Grama Niladhari Division is a Grama Niladhari Division of the Panadura Divisional Secretariat of Kalutara District of Western Province, Sri Lanka . It has Grama Niladhari Division Code 675A.

Ambalanduwa is a surrounded by the Bekkegama, Walana North, Thotawatta and Galthude North Grama Niladhari Divisions.

== Demographics ==
=== Ethnicity ===
The Ambalanduwa Grama Niladhari Division has a Moor majority (90.2%) . In comparison, the Panadura Divisional Secretariat (which contains the Ambalanduwa Grama Niladhari Division) has a Sinhalese majority (84.6%) and a significant Moor population (14.1%)

Ethnicity in Ambalanduwa
1. Moor (90.2%)
2. Sinhalese (6.40%)
3. Sri Lankan Tamil (2.10%)
4. Other (1.40%)

=== Religion ===
The Ambalanduwa Grama Niladhari Division has a Muslim majority (93.0%) . In comparison, the Panadura Divisional Secretariat (which contains the Ambalanduwa Grama Niladhari Division) has a Buddhist majority (78.6%) and a significant Muslim population (14.4%)

Religion in Ambalanduwa
1. Muslim (93.0%)
2. Buddhist (6.10%)
3. Other (0.90%)
