= Kobawaka South Grama Niladhari Division =

Kobawaka South
- Grama Niladhari Division
- Interactive map of Kobawaka South
- Coordinates: 6.671447°N 80.145525°E
- Country: Sri Lanka
- Province: Western Province
- District: Kalutara District
- Divisional Secretariat: Bulathsinhala Divisional Secretariat
- Electoral District: Kalutara Electoral District
- Polling Division: Bulathsinhala Polling Division

Area
  - Total: 5.24 km^{2} (2.02 sq mi)
- Elevation: 112 m (367 ft)

Population (2012)
  - Total: 1,622
  - Density: 310/km^{2} (800/sq mi)
- ISO 3166 code: LK-1312065

Kobawaka South

Kobawaka South Grama Niladhari Division is a Grama Niladhari Division of the Bulathsinhala Divisional Secretariat of Kalutara District of Western Province, Sri Lanka . It has Grama Niladhari Division Code 813B.

Kobawaka South is a surrounded by the Egaloya, Galahena, Ihala Naragala South, Retiyala and Kobawaka North Grama Niladhari Divisions.

== Demographics ==
=== Ethnicity ===
The Kobawaka South Grama Niladhari Division has a Sinhalese majority (75.6%) and a significant Indian Tamil population (22.4%) . In comparison, the Bulathsinhala Divisional Secretariat (which contains the Kobawaka South Grama Niladhari Division) has a Sinhalese majority (85.0%)

Ethnicity in Kobawaka South
1. Sinhalese (75.6%)
2. Indian Tamil (22.4%)
3. Sri Lankan Tamil (2.00%)
4. Other (0.10%)

=== Religion ===
The Kobawaka South Grama Niladhari Division has a Buddhist majority (75.7%) and a significant Hindu population (18.7%) . In comparison, the Bulathsinhala Divisional Secretariat (which contains the Kobawaka South Grama Niladhari Division) has a Buddhist majority (84.8%) and a significant Hindu population (10.2%)

Religion in Kobawaka South
1. Buddhist (75.7%)
2. Hindu (18.7%)
3. Roman Catholic (3.20%)
4. Other Christian (2.30%)
5. Other (0.10%)
