= Nauththuduwa =

Nauththuduwa නවුත්තුඩුව நௌத்துடுவா
- Village
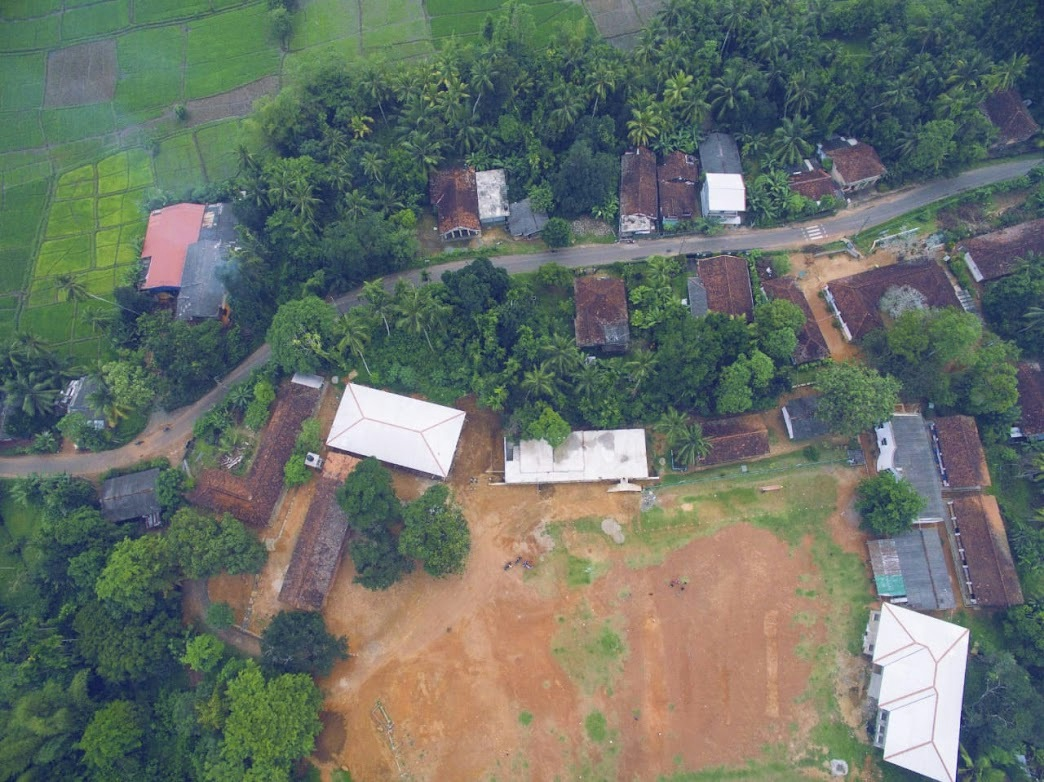
- School Ground, 408 Main Road and Paddy Fields

- Location in Sri Lanka
- Coordinates: 6.50°N 80.09°E
- Country: Sri Lanka
- Province: Western Province
- District: Kalutara District
- DS Division: Matugama
- Grama Niladhari Division: Nauththuduwa
- Pradeshiya Sabha: Matugama Pradeshiya Sabha

Languages
  - Official: Sinhala, Tamil
- Time zone: UTC+5:30 (Sri Lanka Standard Time)
- Postal Code: 12106
- Telephone code: 034
- Climate: Af
- Avg. annual rainfall: 2,931 mm (115.4 in)

Nauththuduwa (නවුත්තුඩුව, நௌத்துடுவா) is a village in the Kalutara District of the Western Province of Sri Lanka. It is situated within the Matugama Divisional Secretariat approximately 71 km (44 mi) from Colombo.

The village is located in an agricultural area predominantly cultivating rubber, coconut, and tea crops. It lies within the Kalu Ganga river basin.

== Etymology ==
The name "Nauththuduwa" includes the Sinhala word "duwa" (දූව) meaning "island". Alternate spellings include,

- Nauththuduwa
- Nawattuduwa
- Navuttuduva
- Nawuththuduwa
- Navuththuduwa
- Nawaththuduwa
- Nawuttuduva
- Navattuduwa
- Nawathtuduwa
- Navathtuduwa
- Navathuduwa
- Nawathuduwa
- Navuthuduwa
- Nawuthtuduwa
- Nawatuduwa
- Navatuduwa

== Geography ==
=== Location ===
Located at approximately 6.50°N 80.09°E, Nauththuduwa is part of the coastal lowland zone of the Western Province. It is one of 57 Grama Niladhari Divisions in the Matugama Divisional Secretariat, covering an area of approximately 105 km^{2} (41 sq mi).

The village lies within the Kalu Ganga river basin.

=== Climate ===
Nauththuduwa has a tropical rainforest climate with an average annual rainfall of about 2,931 mm (115.4 in). The wettest months coincide with the Southwest Monsoon from May through October, peaking at around 370 mm (15 in) rainfall in October.

Temperatures range from 26.3 °C (79.3 °F) to 27.8 °C (82.0 °F), with humidity between 75 and 86%. Rainfall occurs on approximately 267 days per year.

Climate data for Nauththuduwa area (based on regional climate data)
| Month | Jan | Feb | Mar | Apr | May | Jun | Jul | Aug | Sep | Oct | Nov | Dec | Year |
|---|---|---|---|---|---|---|---|---|---|---|---|---|---|
| Mean daily maximum °C (°F) | 30.3 (86.5) | 30.8 (87.4) | 31.3 (88.3) | 31.2 (88.2) | 30.5 (86.9) | 29.7 (85.5) | 29.3 (84.7) | 29.4 (84.9) | 29.5 (85.1) | 29.4 (84.9) | 29.3 (84.7) | 29.6 (85.3) | 30.0 (86.0) |
| Daily mean °C (°F) | 26.5 (79.7) | 26.8 (80.2) | 27.8 (82.0) | 27.9 (82.2) | 27.8 (82.0) | 27.3 (81.1) | 26.9 (80.4) | 26.9 (80.4) | 26.9 (80.4) | 26.8 (80.2) | 26.3 (79.3) | 26.4 (79.5) | 27.0 (80.6) |
| Mean daily minimum °C (°F) | 22.7 (72.9) | 22.8 (73.0) | 24.3 (75.7) | 24.6 (76.3) | 25.1 (77.2) | 24.9 (76.8) | 24.5 (76.1) | 24.4 (75.9) | 24.3 (75.7) | 24.2 (75.6) | 23.3 (73.9) | 23.2 (73.8) | 24.0 (75.2) |
| Average precipitation mm (inches) | 89 (3.5) | 75 (3.0) | 147 (5.8) | 247 (9.7) | 348 (13.7) | 224 (8.8) | 185 (7.3) | 187 (7.4) | 257 (10.1) | 370 (14.6) | 318 (12.5) | 151 (5.9) | 2,931 (115.4) |
Source: Climate-Data.org

== History ==
In the 15th century, the area was part of Pasdun Korale, a division within the Kingdom of Kotte. Colonial rule began in 1505 with the Portuguese, succeeded by the Dutch in 1655, then the British in 1796. During the British era, plantation agriculture, including rubber cultivation, was established in the region.

== Demographics ==
Population data for Nauththuduwa at the Grama Niladhari Division level has not been published. The Matugama Divisional Secretariat reported 26,991 registered families in a 2020 government survey.

== Economy ==
The economy of Nauththuduwa is based on agriculture with rubber, coconut, and tea cultivation being the primary crops. Rubber plantations in the area date to the early 20th century.

== Infrastructure ==
=== Transportation ===
Nauththuduwa is situated along the 408 Main Road, a regional road linking several rural and semi-urban locations in Western Province. This road connects Nauththuduwa to Matugama town and links to the A2 Colombo-Galle highway and the Southern Expressway via feeder roads, with the Dodangoda Interchange approximately 10 km away.

Public bus services operate along the 408 Main Road, connecting Nauththuduwa with nearby towns including Matugama and Aluthgama.

=== Utilities ===
Electricity is available to the majority of households, with grid coverage near 98%. Telecommunications services are provided through mobile and cable networks. Medical services are accessible through Katugahahena divisional hospital and hospitals in Matugama.

== Education ==
=== Nauththuduwa Maha Vidyalaya ===
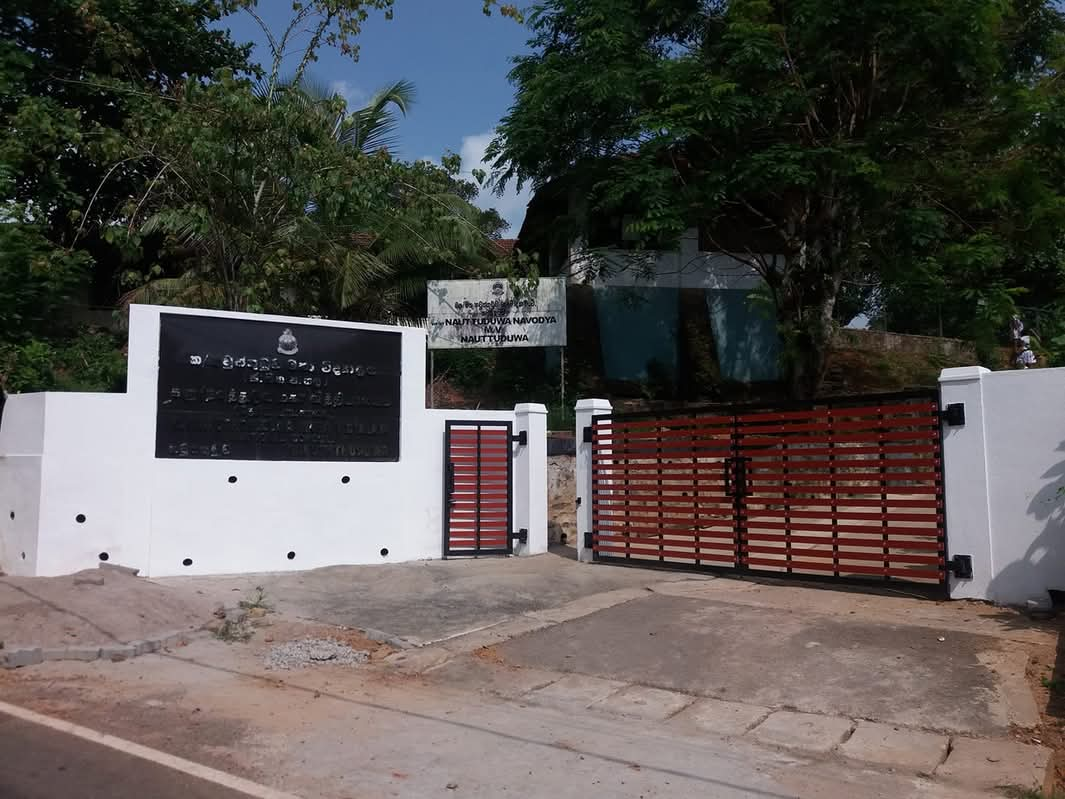
Nauththuduwa Maha Vidyalaya

Nauththuduwa Maha Vidyalaya is a government provincial school providing Sinhala medium education to children from Nauththuduwa and surrounding villages.

=== Sri Siddhartha Piyarathana Sunday School ===
The Sri Siddhartha Piyarathana Sunday School (සිරි සිද්ධාර්ථ පියරතන දහම් පාසල) provides Buddhist religious education and is based at the Sri Siddhartharama Temple.

== Religion ==
Nauththuduwa hosts religious institutions serving Buddhist and Catholic communities.

=== Buddhism ===
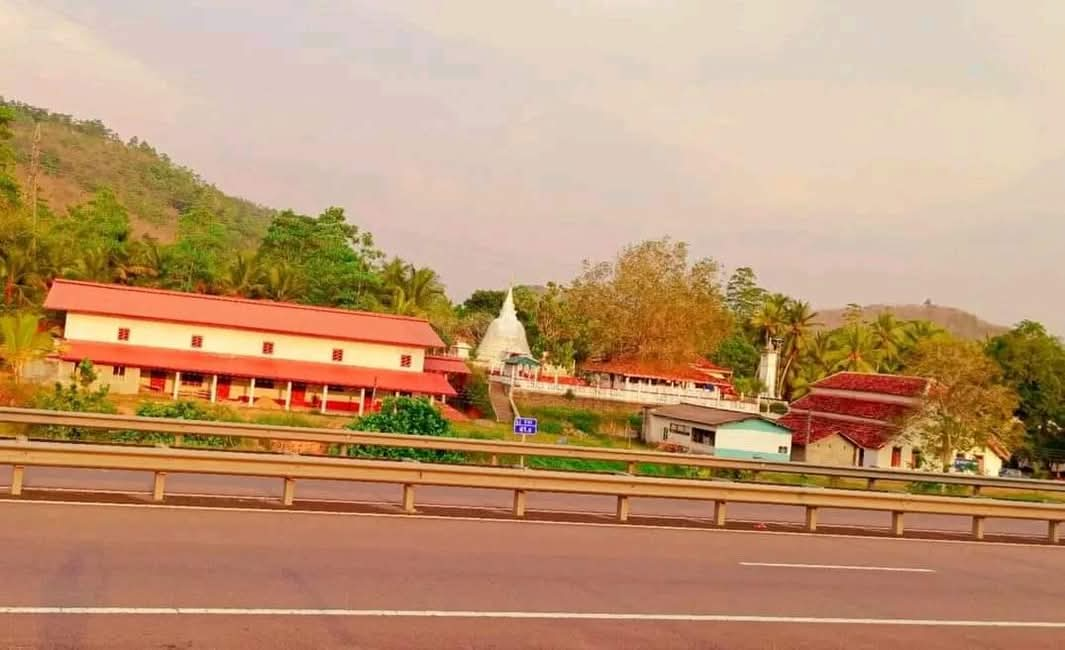
Sri Siddhartharama Temple

Sri Siddhartharama Temple (සිරි සිද්ධාර්ථාරාම විහාරය) is a Buddhist temple in Nauththuduwa.

=== Catholicism ===
St. Anthony's Church in Pallegoda serves local Catholics and is under the Roman Catholic Archdiocese of Colombo, administratively linked to St. Michael's Church, Nagoda.

== Governance ==
Nauththuduwa is a Grama Niladhari Division, the smallest administrative unit, governed under the Matugama Divisional Secretariat with local municipal services provided by the Matugama Pradeshiya Sabha.

== Notable people ==
- Dimuthu Kumarasinghe – An international chef, he spent his childhood with his family in his birth village of Nawuttuduwa and received his primary education at Nauththuduwa Maha Vidyalaya.

== See also ==
- Mathugama Divisional Secretariat
- Western Province, Sri Lanka
- Kalutara District
- Grama Niladhari Division
