= Ballapitiya =

Town in Sri Lankan

Ballapitiya බැල්ලපිටිය பெல்லாபிட்டிய
- Town
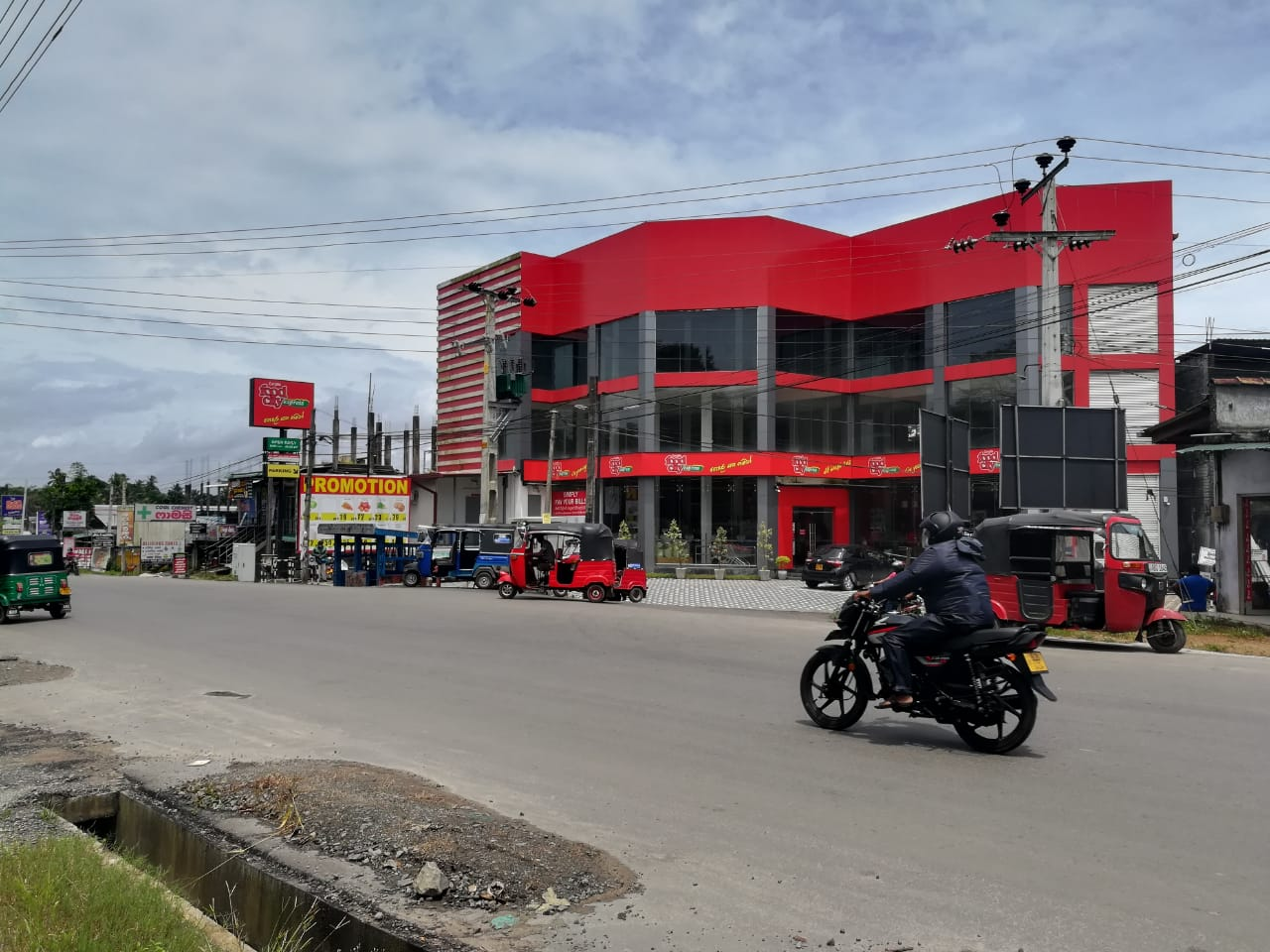

- Location within Sri Lanka
- Coordinates: 6.6929927°N 80.0763478°E
- Country: Sri Lanka
- Province: Western Province
- District: Kalutara District
- Divisional Secretariat: Kalutara Division
- Time zone: UTC+5:30 (Sri Lanka Standard Time)
- Postal Code: 12400

Ballapitiya (Sinhala:බැල්ලපිටිය, pronounced, Tamil:பெல்லாபிட்டிய) is a small town in Kalutara District, Western Province, Sri Lanka.

Ballapitiya is approximately 3 km (1.9 mi) south of Horana, 25 km (16 mi) north of Mathugama and 45 km (28 mi) southeast of Colombo. The town is located on the Horana - Anguruwatota - Aluthgama Road (B157), near its junction with the Nagoda - Kalawellawa - Ballapitiya Road (B304), with public transport links to Kalutara, Horana, Matugama and Kandy.

There are two schools in the area, Ballapitiya Primary School and Remuna Maha Vidyalaya.

== Education ==
- Ballapitiya Primary School
