= Ketchchimalai Mosque =

Mosque in Beruwala, Sri Lanka

- Ketchimala Dharga Shareef
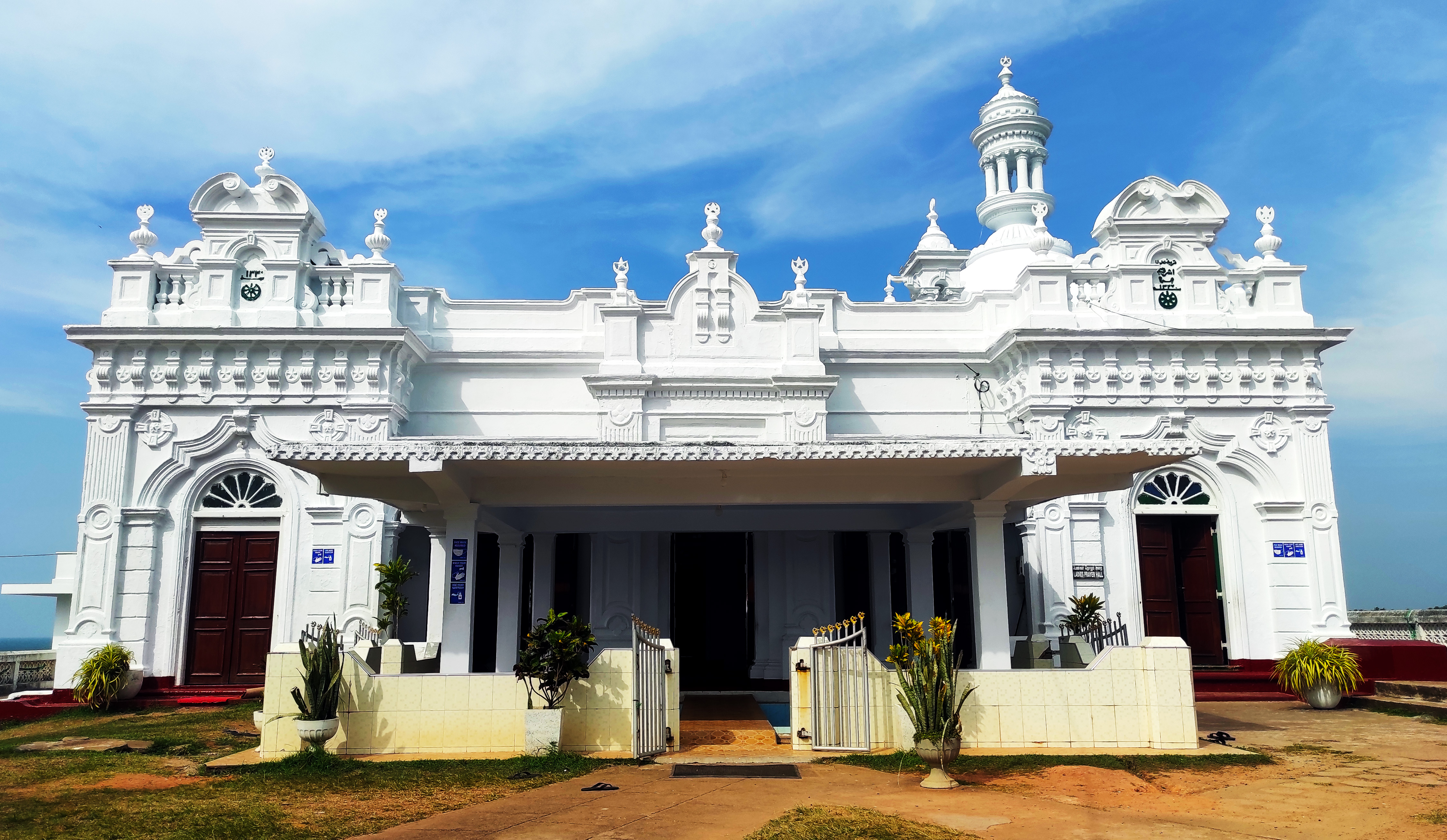

- Location within Sri Lanka

Religion
- Affiliation: Islam
- Status: Open

Location
- Location: Beruwala
- Coordinates: 6°28′22″N 79°58′34″E

Architecture
- Type: mosque

Website
- official website

Ketchimalai Mosque, also known as Ketchimala Dharga Shareef, is a mosque located on a headland overlooking the port of Beruwala, on the southwest coast of Sri Lanka. It is one of the oldest mosques in the country.

According to local folklore, the mosque is built at the spot where the first Muslim Arab traders landed and subsequently settled in the area. It is believed that a vessel carrying seven members of the royal family of Hadhramaut, Yemen came ashore at this location. They included the Sultan Ashraff Waliullah, his five brothers and a sister. When Waliullah died in 1024 AD he was buried in a tomb on the hill. Allegedly one day, when the chief of the Masjid Al-Abrar in Beruwala was cleaning the tomb he stepped on a sharp thorn following which he rest under a tree and fell asleep. During his slumber, Waliullah appeared as a vision and sought that a mosque be built where his tomb was. Many locals mistakenly still think that Waliullah built the mosque.

The current building was constructed in 1911 by an Ash Sheikh Abdullah Aalim Hajiar. It is essentially a squarish white building, with an ornate arched exterior, curving Dutch-style gables, with an unusual domed minaret crowned with a crescent-and-star ornament. Outside the mosque but within its grounds are the graves of two imams (father and son) and a madrasa.

The mosque is the focus for a major Eid al-Fitr festival held at the end of Ramadan, with large numbers of pilgrims attending. Additionally, it hosts the annual Bukhari Muslim Majlis, an event that attracts thousands of people each year and culminates in a grand feast.

On 12 June 2015 the mosque was declared a protected archaeological monument by the government.

== See also ==
- List of mosques in Sri Lanka
- Ba' Alawiyya
