= Al Abrar Mosque, Beruwala =

Mosque in Beruwala, Western, Sri Lanka

Al Abrar Mosque مسجد أبرار
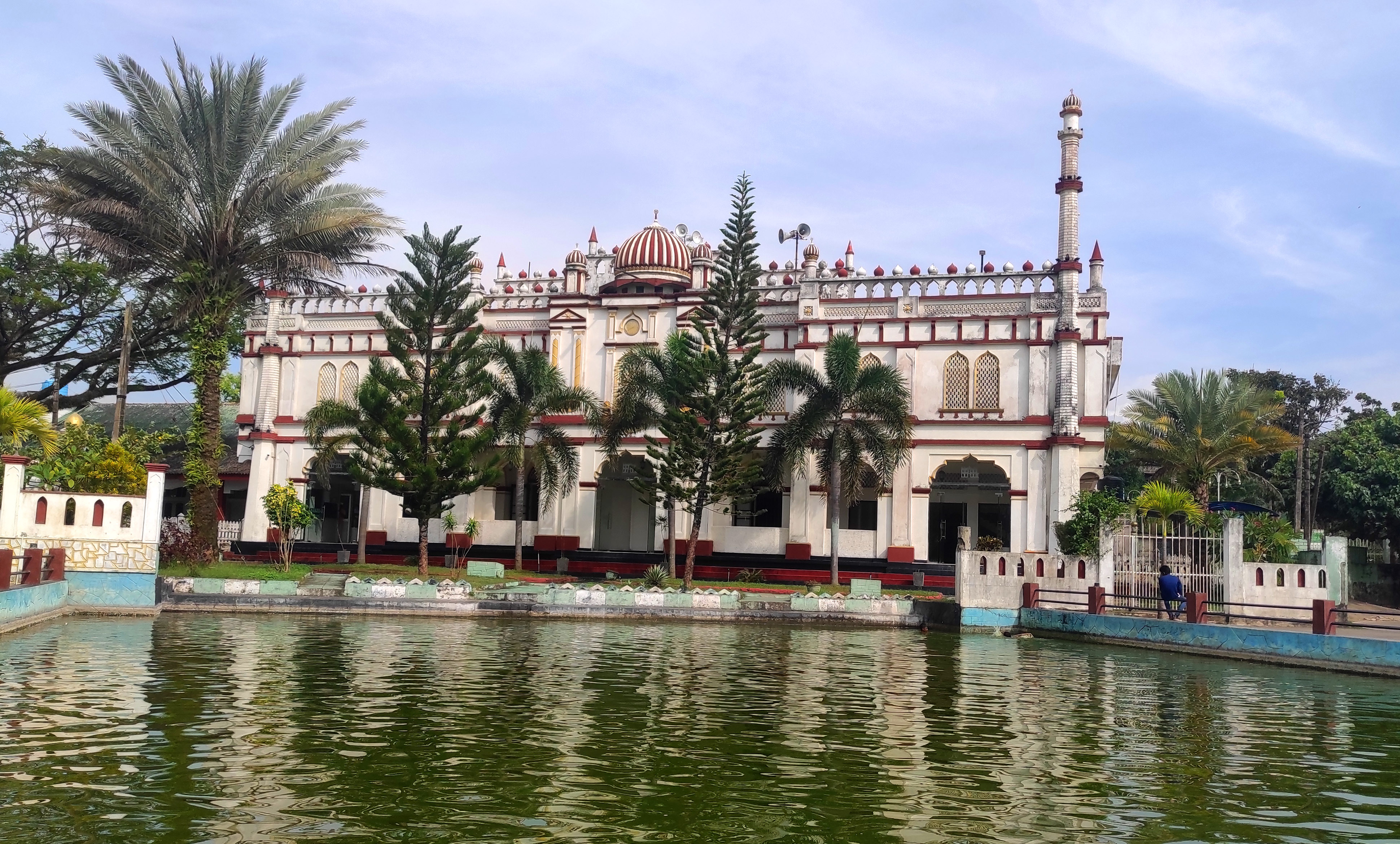

- Location within Sri Lanka

Religion
- Affiliation: Islam
- Year consecrated: 920 AD
- Status: Open

Location
- Location: Beruwala
- Coordinates: 6°27′47″N 79°58′34″E

Architecture
- Type: mosque

Website
- Masjid Al-Abrar Beruwala

Al Abrar Mosque (Arabic: سجد الأبرار), is a mosque in Beruwala, Sri Lanka, which is claimed to be the first and the oldest mosque in the country.

The mosque purportedly dates back to 920 AD, built by Arab merchants who arrived here to trade with locals in spices, ginger and steel en route to China. The mosque, fronted by a large pond, has undergone several extensive reconstructions since it was first built, with little attention paid to preserve any historical aspects of the structure. In 1893 the roof was supported by large round pillars, which were demolished in 1986 when the mosque went through a significant refurbishment and expansion, under the guidance and supervision of Abdul Bakeer Markar, the local member of parliament, representing Beruwala, who later went on to become the Speaker of the Parliament and the first Governor of the Southern Province. The renovated building was designed by W. J. Neil Alles of Surti and Alles Chartered Architects and built by Alhaj S. M. A. Hameed and M. N. A. Haniffa. The mosque currently has the capacity to accommodate 3,000 devotees.

On 8 June 2003 an image of the mosque was included on two commemorative stamps (a Rs.23 and Rs.4.50), released by the Postal Department to mark the first Arab settlement by the Media, Postal and Telecommunications Minister Imthiaz Bakeer Markar.

== See also ==
- List of mosques in Sri Lanka
