= Remuna, Sri Lanka =

Town in Sri Lanka

Remuna රෙමුණ ரெமுண
- Town
- Location within Sri Lanka
- Coordinates: 6.6736°N 80.0710°E
- Province: Western Province
- Districts: Kalutara District
- Established: 1920s
- Time zone: UTC+5:30 (Sri Lanka Standard Time)
- Postal Code: 12400

Remuna (Sinhala:රෙමුණ, Tamil:ரெமுண) is a town in the Kalutara District, Western Province of Sri Lanka.

Remuna was established in the 1920s and is located 6.5 km (4.0 mi) south of Horana, on the Kaluthara-Horana Road (B157). On the northern outskirts of the town is a small lake, Remuna Lake.

== Education ==
It has a provincial school, Remuna Maha Vidyalaya, which provides classes from grade 1 to 13.

== Accommodation ==
- Lotus Grand View Hotel
