= Beruwala Electoral District =

Electoral district of Sri Lanka

Beruwala electoral district was an electoral district of Sri Lanka between March 1960 and February 1989. The district was named after the town of Beruwala in Kalutara District, Western Province. The 1978 Constitution of Sri Lanka introduced the proportional representation electoral system for electing members of Parliament. The existing 160 mainly single-member electoral districts were replaced with 22 multi-member electoral districts. Beruwala electoral district was replaced by the Kalutara multi-member electoral district at the 1989 general elections.

== Members of Parliament ==
Key

Independent SLFP UNP

Election	Member	Party	Term
1960 (March)	Abdul Bakeer Markar	United National Party	1960-1960
1960 (July)	I. A. Cader	Sri Lanka Freedom Party	1960-1965
1965	Abdul Bakeer Markar	United National Party	1965-1970
1970	I. A. Cader	Sri Lanka Freedom Party	1970-1977
1977	Abdul Bakeer Markar	United National Party	1977-1989

== Elections ==
=== 1960 (March) Parliamentary General Election ===
Results of the 4th parliamentary election held on 19 March 1960:

Candidate	Party	Symbol	Votes	%
Abdul Bakeer Markar	United National Party	Elephant	9,339	35.87
Alston Jayasinghe	Sri Lanka Freedom Party	Hand	6,839	26.27
D. F. Goonewardena		Key	6,074	23.33
Jameel Hajiar		Sun	1,433	5.5
H. D. E. Michael		Ladder	923	3.55
I. K. Wijewardena		Umbrella	607	2.33
P. Musiniel de Silva		Eye	404	1.55
S. Jayasooriya		Cartwheel	259	0.99
Valid Votes			25,868	99.35
Rejected Votes			169	0.65
Total Polled			26,037	100.00
Registered Electors			34,673	
Turnout				75.09

=== 1960 (July) Parliamentary General Election ===
Results of the 5th parliamentary election held on 20 July 1960:

Candidate	Party	Symbol	Votes	%
I. A. Cader	Sri Lanka Freedom Party	Hand	13,968	53.70
Abdul Bakeer Markar	United National Party	Elephant	11,197	43.05
S. B. S. de Silva		Cartwheel	356	1.37
Alston Jayasinghe		Rabbit	349	1.34
Valid Votes			25,870	99.45
Rejected Votes			142	0.55
Total Polled			26,012	100.00
Registered Electors			34,673	
Turnout				75.02

=== 1965 Parliamentary General Election ===
Results of the 6th parliamentary election held on 22 March 1965:

Candidate	Party	Symbol	Votes	%
Abdul Bakeer Markar	United National Party	Elephant	18,729	51.74
I. A. Cader	Sri Lanka Freedom Party	Hand	16,998	46.96
D. F. Galhena		Key	140	0.39
Alston Jayasinghe		Cartwheel	128	0.35
Valid Votes			35,985	99.41
Rejected Votes			213	0.59
Total Polled			36,198	100.00
Registered Electors			42,580	
Turnout				85.01

=== 1970 Parliamentary General Election ===
Results of the 7th parliamentary election held on 27 May 1970:

Candidate	Party	Symbol	Votes	%
I. A. Cader	Sri Lanka Freedom Party	Hand	23,036	54.19
Abdul Bakeer Markar	United National Party	Elephant	19,096	44.92
D. F. Galhena		Flower	274	0.65
Valid Votes			42,406	99.98
Rejected Votes			107	0.25
Total Polled			42,513	100.00
Registered Electors			47,987	
Turnout				88.59

=== 1977 Parliamentary General Election ===
Results of the 8th parliamentary election held on 21 July 1977:

Candidate	Party	Symbol	Votes	%
Abdul Bakeer Markar	United National Party	Elephant	46,833	48.26
R. G. Samaranayake	Sri Lanka Freedom Party	Hand	19,211	19.80
G. I. D. Dharmasekera	Communist Party of Ceylon	Star	13,231	13.64
Jabir Nowfel Saly		Cup	10,147	10.46
Tudor de Silva		Lamp	2,167	2.23
Gunapala Senasinghe		Flower	1,003	1.03
D. A. Ariyananda		Butterfly	536	0.55
S. E. W. Jayasuriya		Umbrella	478	0.49
H. Sevin de Silva		Eye	452	0.47
Karunasena Wijesundara		Cartwheel	380	0.39
D. C. Ambepitiya		Scales	359	0.37
Ariyadasa K. Vithanage		Bell	277	0.29
Alston Jayasinghe		Chair	121	0.12
Disineris		Bird	115	0.12
Reginald Cooray		Aeroplane	54	0.06
Peter Jayasuriya		Book	43	0.04
Valid Votes			95,458	98.37
Rejected Votes			1,578	1.63
Total Polled			97,036	100.00
Registered Electors			54,799	
Turnout				
