= Thudugala Ella =

The Thudugala Ella
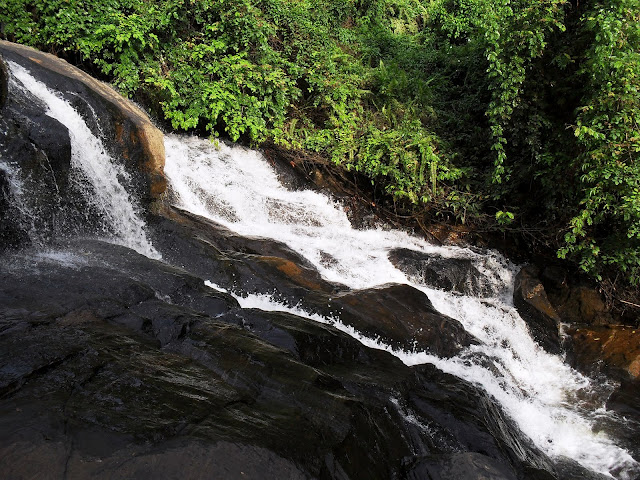
- Location: Dodangoda, Sri Lanka
- Type: Cascade
- Total height: 8 m (26 ft)

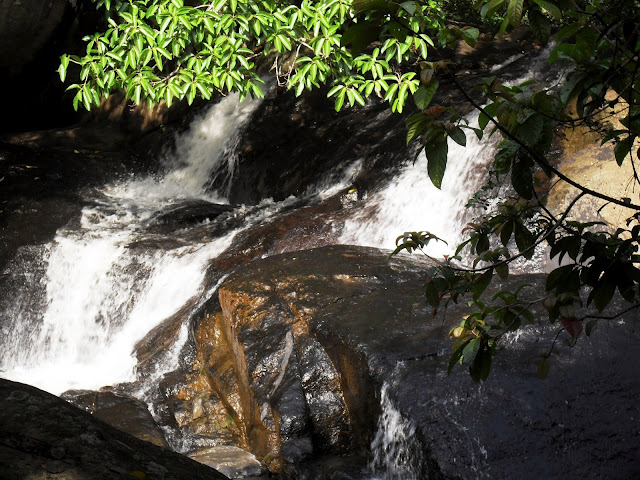
A view of the waterfall at top ...

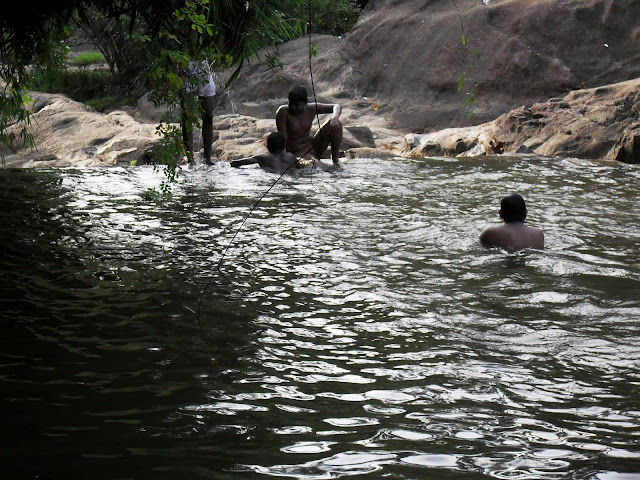
A view of the waterfall at down ....

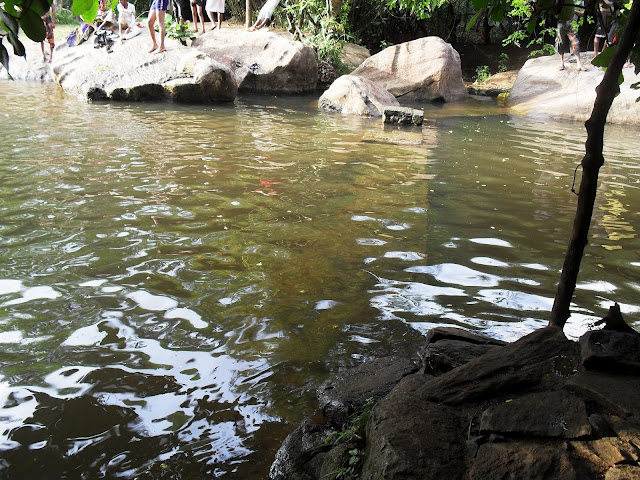
A bathing place ...

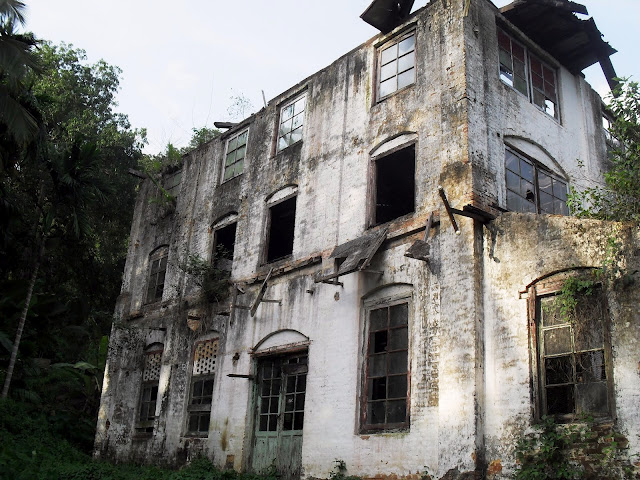
The old bungalow near the waterfall ...

The Thudugala Ella (Sinhala: තුඩුගල ඇල්ල) waterfall is located in Thudugala village in Dodangoda Divisional Secretariat in Kalutara District of Western Province, Sri Lanka. Out of around 382 recorded waterfalls in Sri Lanka, the rank of this is 268th.

== Attraction ==
The falls, which has become a famous bathing place, is situated in an estate once owned by a British settler, and his wrecked country house can still be seen there. There is also a natural stream pool surrounded by “Ketala” plants and fern. In the nearby forest reserve there are many migratory birds and local birds, e.g. the pale-billed flowerpecker, the smallest bird in the country.

Though shorter than other waterfalls in Sri Lanka such as the 263 metres (862.9 ft) high Bambarakanda Falls, the 8 metres (26.2 ft) high Thudugala Ella has been listed as one of the most popular waterfalls in the country by Lanka Council on Water Falls (CLWF).

Another feature here is that a tunnel runs under the waterfall and comes out on top at one side of it.

== Route ==
The route to the waterfall starts from Katukurunda Junction off the Galle Road; 5 miles (8.0 km) from there on Matugama Road to Thudugala junction and from there 8 miles (12.9 km) to the waterfall.

When travelling from Thudugala junction, visitors will come to another junction called "Ellagāwa (Near the waterfall) Junction" with a signboard of a rubber plantation. From there, visitors to the waterfall and its natural bathing places will take the left road which runs over a small bridge nearby. The right road leads only to an artificial bathing place, which does not have a view of the Thudugala Ella waterfall.

== Gallery ==
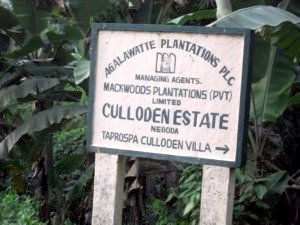
The signboard at the junction...

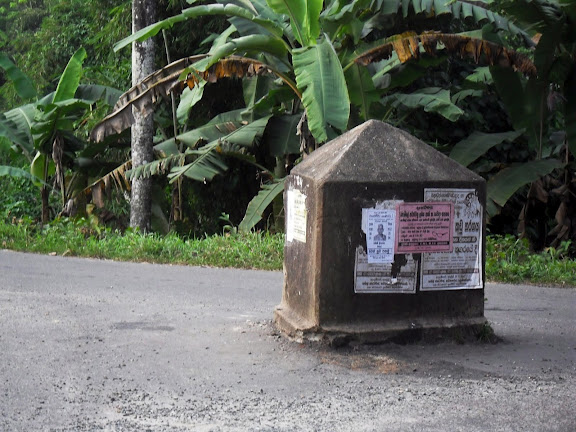
Roundabout in the middle of the junction ...

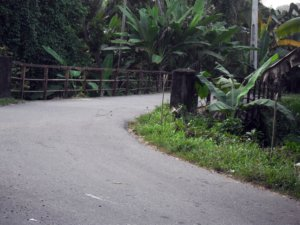
The left road to the waterfall...
