= Katukele Jumma Mosque =

Mosque in Katukele, Central, Sri Lanka

- Location within Sri Lanka

Religion
- Affiliation: Islam
- Province: Central

Location
- Location: Katukele Masjid Road, Kandy
- Country: Sri Lanka
- Interactive map of Katukele Jumma Mosque
- Coordinates: 7°17′10.0″N 80°37′24.7″E

Architecture
- Type: mosque

The Katukele Jumma Mosque, or the Katukele Grand Mosque, is a mosque located in the Katukele neighborhood within Kandy, Central Province, Sri Lanka. The mosque was visited by President Ranil Wickremesinghe and Prime Minister Harini Amarasuriya in April and September 2024, respectively.

== See also ==
- Islam in Sri Lanka
- List of mosques in Sri Lanka
