= Barberyn Lighthouse =

Barberyn Lighthouse Beruwala
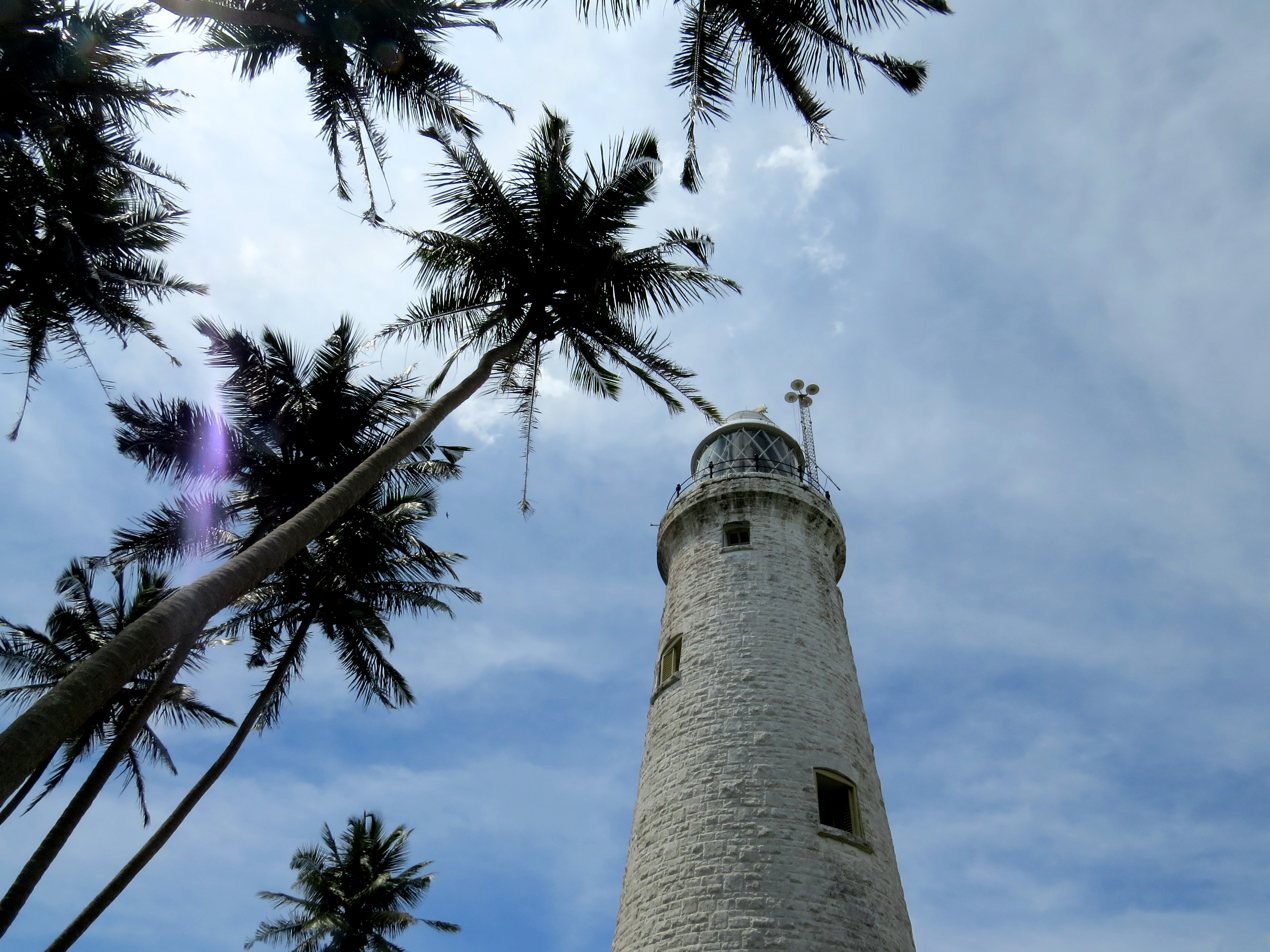
- Location: Beruwala; Kalutara District; Sri Lanka
- Coordinates: 06°27′48.7″N 79°58′06″E

Tower
- Constructed: 1888-89
- Construction: granite tower
- Automated: no
- Height: 34 m (112 ft)
- Shape: cylindrical tower with balcony and lantern
- Markings: white tower
- Operator: Sri Lanka Ports Authority
- Heritage: Archaeological Protected Monument (25 March 2016)

Light
- First lit: November 1889
- Focal height: 46 m (151 ft)
- Lens: hyperradiant Fresnel lens
- Range: 27 nautical miles (50 km; 31 mi)
- Characteristic: Fl W 20s.

Barberyn Lighthouse (also known as Beruwala Lighthouse) is a lighthouse located on Barberyn Island. Barberyn Island a 3.25 ha (8.0 acres) island situated 0.8 km (0.50 mi) offshore from the town of Beruwala on the south-west coast of Sri Lanka, 56 km (35 mi) south of Colombo.The lighthouse is a 34 m (112 ft) high round white conical granite tower.

The lighthouse was completed in November 1889, and operated by the Imperial Lighthouse Service. In 1969 it was upgraded with the replacement of the old dioptric apparatus (produced by Chance Brothers) and with a pedestal rotating beacon (Pharos Marine PRB-21 sealed beam optic and drive pedestal). It was further modernised in 2000, with the introduction of a Differential Global Positioning System (DGPS) and is computer linked to the other major lighthouses around the country. The Barberyn Lighthouse is one of the four international lighthouses in Sri Lanka.

== See also ==
- List of lighthouses in Sri Lanka
