= Batagoda =

Coordinates: 6°39′N 80°02′E

Batagoda is a village in the Kalutara district of Sri Lanka. It is 14 kilometres away from the city of Kalutara. The temple of Batagoda, Bhodimalu Viharaya is one of ancient places of this village and it situated in middle of the village. Its population is about 1500. The village itself has an agricultural background.
