= Dodangoda Divisional Secretariat =

- Divisional Secretariat
- Interactive map of Dodangoda Divisional Secretariat
- Country: Sri Lanka
- Province: Western Province
- District: Kalutara District
- Time zone: UTC+5:30 (Sri Lanka Standard Time)

Dodangoda Divisional Secretariat is a Divisional Secretariat of Kalutara District, of Western Province, Sri Lanka.

== Location ==
- Divisional Secretariats Portal

Dodangoda Divisional Secretariat is situated in the western part of Kalutara district and bordered from north by Divisional Secretariats of Kalutara, Bandaragama and Madurawala; from east by Divisional Secretariat of Madurawala and Matugama; and from west by Divisional Secretariats of Beruwala and Kalutara. The division is included in the Matugama Electoral Division of Kalutara District.

== Elevation ==
The highest elevation of 223 meters from the sea level is in Wellatha east area and the lowest is around the Kalu River (Kalu Ganga) in north-west quarter.

== Land ==
The extent of this division is 10,700 hectares (107 square kilometers), and it is 6.7% of whole land area of the district. When considered the ground differences, the two main units of land can be clearly recognized:

1. River Overflowing Flat Lands & Low Land Zone

The North boundary area associated with “Kalu Ganga” almost remains as an overflowing flat land whilst the western part almost a low land. Paddy and garden crops are distributed in the above land which can be recognized as a low land 50 meters below the sea level.

2. High Land Zone

According to the physical positioning of the division, the eastern part remains as high land and the area is heavily distributed with rubber. Relatively this zone is 225 meters above the sea level and the elevation difference is about 150 meters.

== Categorization ==
As per the categorization of agro-environmental zones in Sri Lanka, this division is included in the WL1, WL2 and WL3+4 zones.

== Climate ==
Daily normal temperature is 27 °C and humidity level is in between 80 and 85%. Annual normal rainfall will be in between 3,300 and 4,000 mili meters. Main source of rain is the South-West monsoon.

== Crops ==
Due to sufficient rainfall and sunlight available during the whole year without any strong winds, this division is most suitable for crop growing. As the north area of this division remains as an overflowing flat zone, many paddy fields and garden crops can be seen there and many rubber plantations are in the high land of eastern part of the division.

== Population ==
This division, with a population of 60,089, has been divided into 45 Grama Niladhari divisions for purpose of easy administration.

=== Demography ===
Religion in Dodangoda DS Division (2012)
1. Buddhist (87.0%)
2. Hindu (10.0%)
3. Muslim (0.10%)
4. Roman Catholic (2.00%)
5. Other Christian (0.90%)
6. Other (0.00%)

== Focal ==
The road running through Dodangoda Town is the Kalutara-Matugama Main Road. Kalu River (Kalu Ganga) is situated in the north boundary. There are 26 Sinhala and Tamil medium schools in the division. Thudugala Ella waterfall, an important place required to be developed as an environmental and tourism zone is situated in the eastern part of the division. Dodangoda is one of interchanges (entry points) to the Southern Expressway (Sri Lanka) that runs through this Divisional Secretariat.
