= Saddam Hussein Nagar, Sri Lanka =

Saddam Hussein Village සදාම් හුසේන් නගරය சதாம் உசேன் நகர்
- Location in Sri Lanka
- Coordinates: 7°45′59″N 81°35′59″E
- Country: Sri Lanka
- Province: Eastern Province
- District: Batticaloa
- Time zone: UTC+05:30 (SLST)

Saddam Hussein Village (Sinhala:සදාම් හුසේන් නගරය Tamil: சதாம் உசேன் நகர்) also known as Saddam Hussein Nagar, is a village located in Eravur in the Batticaloa district of Sri Lanka.

== Etymology ==
The village was named Saddam Hussein Village derived after the ousted Iraqi politician who served as the fifth President of Iraq 1979 to 2003 Saddam Hussein in recognition of the assistance and Iraq-Sri Lanka Friendship Association.

== History ==
It was when the 1978 Sri Lanka cyclone which was considered the strongest Super Cyclonic Storm to strike Sri Lanka's Eastern Province since modern records began. Then Speaker of the Parliament Marhoom Alhaj M. A. Bakeer Markar used his office to obtain assistance from the Government of Iraq for the affected people while Saddam Hussein Town was built at the entire cost of then Government of Iraq. M. A. Bakeer Markar was also the founder President of the Iraq-Sri Lanka Friendship Association.

The construction of the entire village was fully funded by the Iraqi government which consists around 100 Houses, a School and a mosque named Madina Mosque which was gifted by Saddam Hussein himself.
