= M. A. Bakeer Markar =

Sri Lankan politician (1917–1997)

Deshamanya M. A. Bakeer Markar

Governor of Southern Province
- In office 13 June 1988 – December 1993
- Preceded by: Office created
- Succeeded by: Leslie Mervyn Jayaratne

Minister without Portfolio
- In office September 1983 – June 1988
- President: J. R. Jayewardene
- Prime Minister: Ranasinghe Premadasa

12th Speaker of the Parliament
- In office 21 September 1978 – 30 August 1983
- President: J. R. Jayewardene
- Prime Minister: Ranasinghe Premadasa
- Preceded by: Anandatissa de Alwis
- Succeeded by: E. L. Senanayake

Deputy Speaker of the Parliament
- In office 4 August 1977 – 7 September 1978
- Preceded by: I. A. Cader
- Succeeded by: Norman Waidyaratne

Member of Parliament for Beruwala
- In office April 1965 – March 1970
- Preceded by: I. A. Cader
- Succeeded by: I. A. Cader
- In office March 1960 – April 1960
- Preceded by: Constituency Created
- Succeeded by: I. A. Cader

Personal details
- Born: Mohammed Abdul Bakeer Markar; 12 May 1917 Beruwala, Ceylon
- Died: 10 September 1997 (aged 80) Beruwala, Sri Lanka
- Party: United National Party
- Spouse(s): Sithy Kadija Muhammad Raffai, Jazeela
- Children: 8 including Imthiaz Bakeer Markar
- Education: St. Sebastian's College, Hulftsdorp, Zahira College, Colombo
- Alma mater: Ceylon Law College
- Occupation: Politician
- Profession: Proctor

Deshamanya Marhoom Al Haj Mohammed Abdul Bakeer Markar (12 May 1917 – 10 September 1997) was a Sri Lankan politician and civil servant. He was the speaker of the Parliament of Sri Lanka and the governor of Southern Province.

== Early life and education ==
Bakeer Markar was born on 12 May 1917 in "Hakeem Villa" at Maradana, Beruwala. His father Hakeem Alia Marikkar Mohomed Marikkar was a successful businessman while practicing Ayurvedic medicine and his mother was Rahila Umma Marikkar. His family traced its roots to one Sheik Jamaluddeen-Al-Maghdoomi, an Arab settler who settled down in the coastal town of Beruwala.

The young Bakeer Markar started his education at the local girls school in Beruwala before moving to Colombo at the age of seven to study at the St. Sebastian's School in Hulftsdorp. He then for his secondary education entered Zahira College, Colombo which was then under T. B. Jayah. At Zahira College he was the editor of the college magazine, president of the Muslim Majilis and the Tamil Literary Association.

== Legal career ==
Having completed his Senior Cambridge exams, he enrolled in the Ceylon Law College in 1940 as a law student. However with the onset of the Second World War, he took up duties in Civil Defence Services in 1942 and was sent for civil defense training in India. After the war he completed is law exams and took oaths as an Proctor of the Supreme Court in early 1950 and established his legal practice in the Unofficial Bar in Kalutara where he had a successful practice in the courts of the Southern Province. He was known for his appearing pro bono for maintenance cases at courts for women facing abandonment. In 1951, Bakeer Markar was elected the President of the Kalutara Bar Association.

== Political career ==
=== Local government ===
He started his political career when he was elected member of the Beruwala Urban Council in 1947. He was subsequently elected as the Chairman of the Council. In 1950 he became the Mayor of the Beruwala Municipal Council. He transformed the East and West Municipal Council areas into one Municipal Area. Meanwhile, he was the first to pass a resolution in the Municipal Council that Sinhala should be the official language.

=== Parliament ===
With the formation of the Beruwala Electoral District in 1960, he contested the March 1960 general election from the United National Party (UNP) and won, entering parliament. However, parliament was soon dissolved as the UNP government lost the throne speech and he contest the July 1960 general election, which he lost to I. A. Cader from the Sri Lanka Freedom Party. He won his seat back in the 1965 general election defeating Cader, yet lost it to Cader again in the 1970 general election. In 1977 general election Bakeer Markar became the first Member of Parliament for Beruwela by a majority of 27,000.

=== Speaker ===
Bakeer Markar was thereafter elected the Deputy Speaker of the National State Assembly from 4 August 1977 to 7 September 1978, Then he was elected unanimously as the Speaker of the Parliament of Sri Lanka, serving from 21 September 1978 to 30 August 1983. With that, Bakir Makar became the last Speaker of the old Parliament of Sri Lanka and the first Speaker of the new Parliament of Sri Jayewardenepura. During this period, he was the first to bring the tourism industry, which was limited to the Bentota area, to Beruwela, becoming the Founder of the Beruwala Tourism Zone. During his tenure, new tourism related jobs, jewelry stores, and tourist hotels sprang up in the area as well as tourist police station was also established in the Moragalla area. He served as acting as the Head of State while the President and Prime Minister both was out of the country.

=== Cabinet Minister ===
After he resigned as Speaker on 31 August 1983, he was sworn in as a Cabinet Minister without Portfolio on the same day. In the meantime, he wrote the book Yen Singhalam, which became a cultural pillar among the nations in Sri Lanka.

=== Governor of the Southern Province ===
He resigned from Parliament on 31 June 1988 and was appointed the Governor of the Southern Province. He was awarded the honor of Deshamanya by the President of Sri Lanka in 1992 and finally, he resigned as Governor of the Southern Province and political career on 21 December 1993.

== Religious and community work ==
He was founder President of the All Ceylon Union of Muslim League Youth Fronts. He was also the Vice President of the All Ceylon Muslim League. Further he was the Chairman of the Beruwala, Maradana Mosque Jamaath until his demise.

He hails from Maradana, Beruwala where, as historically revealed the early Arabs who arrived in Ceylon (Sailan) built the first ever Mosque in the country, Masjid Al Abrar. He took great pains in renovating Masjid Al Abrar with the help of his village Jamaath. In doing so he was careful in retaining the shape of the original architectural beauty of the Mosque. Bakeer Markar served as a goodwill Ambassador of Sri Lanka. His close connections with the Iraqi government enabled him to build a village in Eravur named Saddam Hussein Village, an area in the Eastern part of the island. He was the founder President of the Iraq-Sri Lanka Friendship Association and remained in this position until his demise.

In the early 1970s, when the plane carrying the Indonesian Haj Pilgrims on return journey crashed in Sri Lanka it was Bakeer Markar, then as Speaker of the Parliament of Sri Lanka, rushed to the scene of the incident and took personal interest to have the bodies of the pilgrims dispatched to Indonesia. As a token of appreciation the President of Indonesia personally invited him to visit his country. The Indonesian Haj Memorial Building at Katunayake was initiated by him.

== Personal life ==
He was married to Sithy Kadija Muhammad Raffai, the daughter of Mr. and Mrs. Omer Lebbe Marikar Muhammed Raffai of China fort, Beruwala. The couple has one son, Imthiaz Bakeer Markar who later went on to serve as Member of Parliament for Beruwala and served as a Government Minister and daughters Dinah, Shamim and Nylah was born to them. Later, he married Jazeela and they had four children, daughters Haseeba, Faseeha, Faheema and son Yazir.

He died on 10 September 1997 at the age of 80. Later he was buried in his home town of Beruwela.

== See also ==
- List of political families in Sri Lanka

Political offices
Preceded by Office created	Governor of Southern Province; 1978–1983	Succeeded by Leslie Mervyn Jayaratne
Preceded by Anandatissa de Alwis	12th Speaker of the Parliament; 1988–1993	Succeeded by E. L. Senanayake
