= List of mosques in Sri Lanka =

This is a list of mosques in Sri Lanka.

There are approximately 840 mosques in the country and following is a list of some of the notable mosques that are currently operating.

Name	Images	Location	Year/century	Remarks
Al Abrar Mosque		Beruwala	920	The oldest documented mosque in Sri Lanka
Grand Mosque of Colombo		Colombo	948	
Ketchchimalai Mosque		Beruwala	1024	
Auliya Mosque		Batticaloa		
Meera Makam Mosque		Kandy	1824	
Udayar Thoppuwa Mosque		Negombo	1846	
Muhiyadeen Grand Jumu'ah Mosque		Dehiwala	1834	
Meeran Jumma Mosque		Galle	1904	
Jami Ul-Alfar Mosque (Red Mosque)		Colombo	1909	Largest mosque in Sri Lanka
Muhhiyadeen Jummah Mosque (White Mosque)		Matara	1920	
Hanafi Mosque (Red Mosque)		Kandy	1935	
Naleemiah Mosque		Beruwala		
Al Aqsa Grand Jumma Masjith		Kattankudy		Third largest mosque in Sri Lanka

== See also ==
- Islam in Sri Lanka
- Lists of mosques
