= Walallavita Divisional Secretariat =

Coordinates: 6.4115°N 80.1782°E

- Divisional Secretariat
- Interactive map of Walallavita Divisional Secretariat
- Country: Sri Lanka
- Province: Western Province
- District: Kalutara District
- Time zone: UTC+5:30 (Sri Lanka Standard Time)

Walallavita Divisional Secretariat is a Divisional Secretariat of Kalutara District, of Western Province, Sri Lanka.

== Demography ==
Religion in Walallavita DS Division (2012)
1. Buddhist (96.8%)
2. Hindu (2.70%)
3. Muslim (0.00%)
4. Roman Catholic (0.20%)
5. Other Christian (0.30%)
6. Other (0.00%)
