= Kithulgoda =

- Village
- Location within Sri Lanka
- Coordinates: 6°31′N 80°11′E
- Country: Sri Lanka
- District: Kalutara
- Province: Western Province

Kithulgoda is a village which is situated in Kalutara District of Sri Lanka.
