= I. A. Cader =

Sri Lankan politician (1917–1979)

Hon. Ibrahim Adaham Abdul Cader MP

Member of Parliament for Beruwala
- In office July 1960 – 1965
- Preceded by: Abdul Bakeer Markar
- Succeeded by: Abdul Bakeer Markar
- In office 1970–1977
- Preceded by: Abdul Bakeer Markar
- Succeeded by: Abdul Bakeer Markar

Personal details
- Born: Ibrahim Adaham Abdul Cader; 5 January 1917 Thalapitiya, Southern Province, Sri Lanka
- Died: 14 September 1979 (aged 62)
- Other political affiliations: Sri Lanka Freedom Party
- Education: Mahinda College, Galle; St. Peter's College, Colombo
- Occupation: lawyer, businessman, politician

Ibrahim Adaham Abdul Cader, known as I. A. Cader (5 January 1917 – 14 September 1979) was a Sri Lankan lawyer and member of the Parliament of Sri Lanka.

== Biography ==
Ibrahim Adaham Abdul Cader was born in Thalapitiya, Southern Province, Sri Lanka on 5 January 1917 and received his primary school education Mahinda College in Galle before attending St. Peter's College, Colombo. He then entered the Ceylon Law College, passing out as a Proctor. Cader went on to be a lawyer and a gem merchant. He was also elected as the President of the All Ceylon Moors Association.

Cader was a member of the Sri Lanka Freedom Party and in July 1960 was successful in gaining a seat representing the Beruwala Electoral District at the fifth parliamentary election defeating his UNP rival, Abdul Bakeer Markar by 2,771 votes. Between 12 February 1964 and 17 December 1964 he held the position of Deputy Chairman of Committees.

At the sixth parliamentary elections held in March 1965, Cader ran again but was unsuccessful in retaining his seat, losing by just over 1,700 votes to Abdul Bakeer Markar. On 23 October 1969 he was appointed as a Senator by the Governor-General, William Gopallawa. He ran again for the seat of Beruwala in May 1970 this time defeating Markar by almost 4,000 votes. On the 22 May 1970 he was appointed as Deputy Speaker and Chairman of Committees, a position that he held until 18 May 1977.

Cader did not contest the 1977 parliamentary elections and was subsequently assigned as the country's ambassador to Egypt.
