= Panadura Polling Division =

Panadura
- Polling Division
- Coordinates: 6.706438°N 79.924384°E
- Country: Sri Lanka
- Province: Western Province, Sri Lanka
- Electoral District: Kalutara Electoral District

Area
  - Total: 48.85 km^{2} (18.86 sq mi)

Population (2012)
  - Total: 182,285
  - Density: 3,732/km^{2} (9,670/sq mi)
- ISO 3166 code: EC-03A

The Panadura Polling Division is a Polling Division for the city of Panadura in the Kalutara Electoral District in Western Province, Sri Lanka.

== Presidential Election Results ==
=== Summary ===
In the elections between 1982 and 2019, the presidential candidate who won in the Panadura Polling Division also won in the overall Sri Lankan elections 7 out of 8 times. Hence, some consider Panadura to be a bellwether for Sri Lankan Presidential Elections.

Year	Panadura	Kalutara Electoral District	MAE %	Sri Lanka	MAE %
2019	SLPP	SLPP	1.28%	SLPP	5.50%
2015	NDF	UPFA	3.54%	NDF	1.34%
2010	UPFA	UPFA	1.99%	UPFA	2.89%
2005	UPFA	UPFA	2.03%	UPFA	7.15%
1999	PA	PA	3.93%	PA	5.64%
1994	PA	PA	5.69%	PA	4.74%
1988	SLFP	SLFP	3.70%	UNP	7.70%
1982	UNP	UNP	0.80%	UNP	4.09%
Matches/Mean MAE	7/8	6/8	2.87%	8/8	4.88%

=== 2019 Sri Lankan Presidential Election ===
Party	Panadura		Kalutara Electoral District		Sri Lanka	
Party	Votes	%	Votes	%	Votes	%
SLPP	57,447	58.01%	482,920	59.49%	6,924,255	52.25%
NDF	35,761	36.11%	284,213	35.01%	5,564,239	41.99%
NMPP	3,904	3.94%	27,681	3.41%	418,553	3.16%
Other Parties (with < 1%)	1,916	1.93%	16,949	2.09%	345,452	2.61%
Valid Votes	99,028	99.17%	811,763	99.16%	13,252,499	98.99%
Rejected Votes	827	0.83%	6,847	0.84%	135,452	1.01%
Total Polled	99,855	84.11%	818,610	85.71%	13,387,951	83.71%
Registered Electors	118,719		955,080		15,992,568	

=== 2015 Sri Lankan Presidential Election ===
Party	Panadura		Kalutara Electoral District		Sri Lanka	
Party	Votes	%	Votes	%	Votes	%
NDF	46,820	50.15%	349,404	46.46%	6,217,162	51.28%
UPFA	45,908	49.18%	395,890	52.65%	5,768,090	47.58%
Other Parties (with < 1%)	627	0.67%	6,690	0.89%	138,200	1.14%
Valid Votes	93,355	98.78%	751,984	98.90%	12,123,452	98.85%
Rejected Votes	1,152	1.22%	8,381	1.10%	140,925	1.15%
Total Polled	94,507	82.30%	760,365	82.08%	12,264,377	78.69%
Registered Electors	114,828		926,346		15,585,942	

=== 2010 Sri Lankan Presidential Election ===
Party	Panadura		Kalutara Electoral District		Sri Lanka	
Party	Votes	%	Votes	%	Votes	%
UPFA	50,772	61.21%	412,562	63.06%	6,015,934	57.88%
NDF	31,319	37.76%	231,807	35.43%	4,173,185	40.15%
Other Parties (with < 1%)	856	1.03%	9,880	1.51%	204,494	1.97%
Valid Votes	82,947	99.34%	654,249	99.31%	10,393,613	99.03%
Rejected Votes	553	0.66%	4,541	0.69%	101,838	0.97%
Total Polled	83,500	79.10%	658,790	79.05%	10,495,451	66.70%
Registered Electors	105,569		833,360		15,734,587	

=== 2005 Sri Lankan Presidential Election ===
Party	Panadura		Kalutara Electoral District		Sri Lanka	
Party	Votes	%	Votes	%	Votes	%
UPFA	46,097	57.68%	341,693	55.48%	4,887,152	50.29%
UNP	33,034	41.33%	266,043	43.20%	4,706,366	48.43%
Other Parties (with < 1%)	790	0.99%	8,124	1.32%	123,521	1.27%
Valid Votes	79,921	99.06%	615,860	98.95%	9,717,039	98.88%
Rejected Votes	762	0.94%	6,517	1.05%	109,869	1.12%
Total Polled	80,683	79.63%	622,377	79.67%	9,826,908	69.51%
Registered Electors	101,328		781,175		14,136,979	

=== 1999 Sri Lankan Presidential Election ===
Party	Panadura		Kalutara Electoral District		Sri Lanka	
Party	Votes	%	Votes	%	Votes	%
PA	39,081	56.58%	281,217	52.88%	4,312,157	51.12%
UNP	24,976	36.16%	217,423	40.88%	3,602,748	42.71%
JVP	3,647	5.28%	23,770	4.47%	343,927	4.08%
Other Parties (with < 1%)	1,369	1.98%	9,399	1.77%	176,679	2.09%
Valid Votes	69,073	97.17%	531,809	97.83%	8,435,754	97.69%
Rejected Votes	2,014	2.83%	11,796	2.17%	199,536	2.31%
Total Polled	71,087	77.46%	543,605	78.23%	8,635,290	72.17%
Registered Electors	91,768		694,860		11,965,536	

=== 1994 Sri Lankan Presidential Election ===
Party	Panadura		Kalutara Electoral District		Sri Lanka	
Party	Votes	%	Votes	%	Votes	%
PA	42,951	67.27%	295,686	61.47%	4,709,205	62.28%
UNP	20,032	31.37%	178,466	37.10%	2,715,283	35.91%
Other Parties (with < 1%)	865	1.35%	6,867	1.43%	137,040	1.81%
Valid Votes	63,848	98.58%	481,019	98.50%	7,561,526	98.03%
Rejected Votes	922	1.42%	7,309	1.50%	151,706	1.97%
Total Polled	64,770	72.33%	488,328	73.97%	7,713,232	69.12%
Registered Electors	89,554		660,191		11,158,880	

=== 1988 Sri Lankan Presidential Election ===
Party	Panadura		Kalutara Electoral District		Sri Lanka	
Party	Votes	%	Votes	%	Votes	%
SLFP	28,366	51.94%	179,761	49.57%	2,289,857	44.95%
UNP	22,701	41.57%	169,510	46.74%	2,569,199	50.43%
SLMP	3,548	6.50%	13,375	3.69%	235,701	4.63%
Valid Votes	54,615	98.56%	362,646	98.23%	5,094,754	98.24%
Rejected Votes	799	1.44%	6,537	1.77%	91,499	1.76%
Total Polled	55,414	70.74%	369,183	64.20%	5,186,256	55.87%
Registered Electors	78,330		575,008		9,283,143	

=== 1982 Sri Lankan Presidential Election ===
Party	Panadura		Kalutara Electoral District		Sri Lanka	
Party	Votes	%	Votes	%	Votes	%
UNP	26,648	48.88%	211,592	50.15%	3,450,815	52.93%
SLFP	23,861	43.77%	185,874	44.06%	2,546,348	39.05%
JVP	2,011	3.69%	14,499	3.44%	273,428	4.19%
LSSP	1,776	3.26%	8,613	2.04%	58,531	0.90%
Other Parties (with < 1%)	216	0.40%	1,314	0.31%	190,929	2.93%
Valid Votes	54,512	98.77%	421,892	98.76%	6,520,156	98.78%
Rejected Votes	677	1.23%	5,290	1.24%	80,470	1.22%
Total Polled	55,189	81.70%	427,182	83.97%	6,600,626	80.15%
Registered Electors	67,549		508,744		8,235,358	

== Parliamentary Election Results ==
=== Summary ===
The winner of Panadura has matched the final country result 5 out of 7 times. Hence, Panadura is a Weak Bellwether for Parliamentary Elections.

Year	Panadura	Kalutara Electoral District	MAE %	Sri Lanka	MAE %
2015	UPFA	UPFA	1.17%	UNP	2.33%
2010	UPFA	UPFA	2.94%	UPFA	1.06%
2004	UPFA	UPFA	4.90%	UPFA	3.89%
2001	UNP	UNP	1.49%	UNP	2.25%
2000	PA	PA	3.52%	PA	2.89%
1994	PA	PA	4.97%	PA	7.25%
1989	SLFP	UNP	7.26%	UNP	10.15%
Matches/Mean MAE	5/7	6/7	3.75%	7/7	4.26%

=== 2015 Sri Lankan Parliamentary Election ===
Party	Panadura		Kalutara Electoral District		Sri Lanka	
Party	Votes	%	Votes	%	Votes	%
UPFA	40,809	46.63%	338,801	48.58%	4,732,664	42.48%
UNP	39,190	44.78%	310,234	44.48%	5,098,916	45.77%
JVP	6,253	7.14%	38,475	5.52%	544,154	4.88%
Other Parties (with < 1%)	1,271	1.45%	9,951	1.43%	85,579	0.77%
Valid Votes	87,523	97.49%	697,461	97.00%	11,140,333	95.35%
Rejected Votes	2,232	2.49%	21,366	2.97%	516,926	4.42%
Total Polled	89,773	78.18%	719,001	80.13%	11,684,111	77.66%
Registered Electors	114,828		897,349		15,044,490	

=== 2010 Sri Lankan Parliamentary Election ===
Party	Panadura		Kalutara Electoral District		Sri Lanka	
Party	Votes	%	Votes	%	Votes	%
UPFA	37,818	59.64%	313,836	63.74%	4,846,388	60.38%
UNP	18,022	28.42%	139,596	28.35%	2,357,057	29.37%
DNA	7,340	11.57%	36,722	7.46%	441,251	5.50%
Other Parties (with < 1%)	234	0.37%	2,246	0.46%	34,923	0.44%
Valid Votes	63,414	91.48%	492,400	90.41%	8,026,322	96.03%
Rejected Votes	5,851	8.44%	51,751	9.50%	581,465	6.96%
Total Polled	69,320	65.66%	544,606	65.21%	8,358,246	59.29%
Registered Electors	105,569		835,186		14,097,690	

=== 2004 Sri Lankan Parliamentary Election ===
Party	Panadura		Kalutara Electoral District		Sri Lanka	
Party	Votes	%	Votes	%	Votes	%
UPFA	35,687	48.03%	291,208	51.72%	4,223,126	45.70%
UNP	24,020	32.32%	212,721	37.78%	3,486,792	37.73%
JHU	14,274	19.21%	56,615	10.06%	552,723	5.98%
Other Parties (with < 1%)	328	0.44%	2,475	0.44%	49,030	0.53%
Valid Votes	74,309	95.82%	563,019	94.82%	9,241,931	94.52%
Rejected Votes	3,240	4.18%	30,741	5.18%	534,452	5.47%
Total Polled	77,549	77.75%	593,760	79.58%	9,777,821	75.74%
Registered Electors	99,741		746,138		12,909,631	

=== 2001 Sri Lankan Parliamentary Election ===
Party	Panadura		Kalutara Electoral District		Sri Lanka	
Party	Votes	%	Votes	%	Votes	%
UNP	32,013	43.88%	254,339	45.94%	4,086,026	45.62%
PA	29,288	40.14%	226,468	40.91%	3,330,815	37.19%
JVP	9,435	12.93%	60,451	10.92%	815,353	9.10%
SU	1,367	1.87%	5,103	0.92%	50,665	0.57%
Other Parties (with < 1%)	857	1.17%	7,258	1.31%	86,426	0.97%
Valid Votes	72,960	95.23%	553,619	94.44%	8,955,844	94.77%
Rejected Votes	3,655	4.77%	32,617	5.56%	494,009	5.23%
Total Polled	76,615	79.40%	586,236	81.68%	9,449,878	76.03%
Registered Electors	96,487		717,764		12,428,762	

=== 2000 Sri Lankan Parliamentary Election ===
Party	Panadura		Kalutara Electoral District		Sri Lanka	
Party	Votes	%	Votes	%	Votes	%
PA	30,848	43.08%	255,175	46.86%	3,899,329	45.33%
UNP	25,994	36.30%	217,215	39.89%	3,451,765	40.12%
JVP	7,047	9.84%	38,373	7.05%	518,725	6.03%
SU	4,035	5.63%	15,619	2.87%	127,859	1.49%
NUA	2,857	3.99%	11,943	2.19%	185,593	2.16%
Other Parties (with < 1%)	832	1.16%	6,193	1.14%	136,137	1.58%
Valid Votes	71,613	N/A	544,518	N/A	8,602,617	N/A

=== 1994 Sri Lankan Parliamentary Election ===
Party	Panadura		Kalutara Electoral District		Sri Lanka	
Party	Votes	%	Votes	%	Votes	%
PA	39,309	58.52%	271,754	53.77%	3,887,805	48.94%
UNP	25,692	38.25%	221,115	43.75%	3,498,370	44.04%
MEP	1,163	1.73%	5,914	1.17%	68,538	0.86%
SLPF	970	1.44%	6,238	1.23%	90,078	1.13%
Other Parties (with < 1%)	41	0.06%	339	0.07%	813	0.01%
Valid Votes	67,175	96.22%	505,360	95.21%	7,943,688	95.20%
Rejected Votes	2,642	3.78%	25,397	4.79%	400,395	4.80%
Total Polled	69,817	77.96%	530,757	80.20%	8,344,095	74.75%
Registered Electors	89,554		661,793		11,163,064	

=== 1989 Sri Lankan Parliamentary Election ===
Party	Panadura		Kalutara Electoral District		Sri Lanka	
Party	Votes	%	Votes	%	Votes	%
SLFP	23,778	47.08%	131,510	40.94%	1,785,369	31.90%
UNP	20,473	40.53%	160,069	49.84%	2,838,005	50.71%
USA	3,025	5.99%	12,342	3.84%	141,983	2.54%
SLMC	2,428	4.81%	12,971	4.04%	202,016	3.61%
MEP	641	1.27%	2,690	0.84%	90,480	1.62%
Other Parties (with < 1%)	165	0.33%	1,611	0.50%	67,723	1.21%
Valid Votes	50,510	95.90%	321,193	94.10%	5,596,468	93.87%
Rejected Votes	2,162	4.10%	20,139	5.90%	365,563	6.13%
Total Polled	52,672	68.55%	341,332	59.86%	5,962,031	63.60%
Registered Electors	76,836		570,193		9,374,164	

== Demographics ==
=== Ethnicity ===
The Panadura Polling Division has a Sinhalese majority (84.6%) and a significant Moor population (14.1%) . In comparison, the Kalutara Electoral District (which contains the Panadura Polling Division) has a Sinhalese majority (86.8%)

Ethnicity in Panadura
1. Sinhalese (84.6%)
2. Moor (14.1%)
3. Other (1.30%)

=== Religion ===
The Panadura Polling Division has a Buddhist majority (78.6%) and a significant Muslim population (14.4%) . In comparison, the Kalutara Electoral District (which contains the Panadura Polling Division) has a Buddhist majority (83.4%)

Religion in Panadura
1. Buddhist (78.6%)
2. Muslim (14.4%)
3. Roman Catholic (5.10%)
4. Other Christian (1.30%)
5. Other (0.60%)
