= Agalawatta Divisional Secretariat =

Coordinates: 6.5108°N 80.1656°E

- Divisional Secretariat
- Interactive map of Agalawatta Divisional Secretariat
- Country: Sri Lanka
- Province: Western Province
- District: Kalutara District
- Time zone: UTC+5:30 (Sri Lanka Standard Time)

Agalawatta Divisional Secretariat is a Divisional Secretariat of Kalutara District, of Western Province, Sri Lanka. As of the 2012 census, the division had a population of 36,669 residents.

== Demography ==
Religion in Agalawatta DS Division (2012)
1. Buddhist (96.7%)
2. Hindu (2.10%)
3. Muslim (0.20%)
4. Roman Catholic (0.30%)
5. Other Christian (0.50%)
6. Other (0.00%)
