= Bulathsinhala Polling Division =

Bulathsinhala
- Polling Division
- Coordinates: 6.646018°N 80.144162°E
- Country: Sri Lanka
- Province: Western Province, Sri Lanka
- Electoral District: Kalutara Electoral District

Area
  - Total: 286.74 km^{2} (110.71 sq mi)

Population (2012)
  - Total: 98,981
  - Density: 345/km^{2} (890/sq mi)
- ISO 3166 code: EC-03D

The Bulathsinhala Polling Division is a Polling Division in the Kalutara Electoral District, in the Western Province, Sri Lanka.

== Presidential Election Results ==
=== Summary ===
The winner of Bulathsinhala has matched the final country result 7 out of 8 times. Hence, Bulathsinhala is a Strong Bellwether for Presidential Elections.

Year	Bulathsinhala	Kalutara Electoral District	MAE %	Sri Lanka	MAE %
2019	SLPP	SLPP	0.39%	SLPP	6.35%
2015	UPFA	UPFA	3.62%	NDF	8.51%
2010	UPFA	UPFA	2.24%	UPFA	7.16%
2005	UPFA	UPFA	3.20%	UPFA	1.98%
1999	PA	PA	3.24%	PA	1.57%
1994	PA	PA	4.84%	PA	5.76%
1988	UNP	SLFP	1.67%	UNP	2.40%
1982	UNP	UNP	1.32%	UNP	4.73%
Matches/Mean MAE	7/8	6/8	2.57%	8/8	4.81%

=== 2019 Sri Lankan Presidential Election ===
Party	Bulathsinhala		Kalutara Electoral District		Sri Lanka	
Party	Votes	%	Votes	%	Votes	%
SLPP	42,021	59.51%	482,920	59.49%	6,924,255	52.25%
NDF	25,407	35.98%	284,213	35.01%	5,564,239	41.99%
Other Parties (with < 1%)	1,721	2.44%	16,949	2.09%	345,452	2.61%
NMPP	1,468	2.08%	27,681	3.41%	418,553	3.16%
Valid Votes	70,617	99.29%	811,763	99.16%	13,252,499	98.99%
Rejected Votes	503	0.71%	6,847	0.84%	135,452	1.01%
Total Polled	71,120	86.27%	818,610	85.71%	13,387,951	83.71%
Registered Electors	82,439		955,080		15,992,568	

=== 2015 Sri Lankan Presidential Election ===
Party	Bulathsinhala		Kalutara Electoral District		Sri Lanka	
Party	Votes	%	Votes	%	Votes	%
UPFA	37,311	56.17%	395,890	52.65%	5,768,090	47.58%
NDF	28,341	42.66%	349,404	46.46%	6,217,162	51.28%
Other Parties (with < 1%)	779	1.17%	6,690	0.89%	138,200	1.14%
Valid Votes	66,431	98.93%	751,984	98.90%	12,123,452	98.85%
Rejected Votes	716	1.07%	8,381	1.10%	140,925	1.15%
Total Polled	67,147	81.76%	760,365	82.08%	12,264,377	78.69%
Registered Electors	82,123		926,346		15,585,942	

=== 2010 Sri Lankan Presidential Election ===
Party	Bulathsinhala		Kalutara Electoral District		Sri Lanka	
Party	Votes	%	Votes	%	Votes	%
UPFA	38,018	65.04%	412,562	63.06%	6,015,934	57.88%
NDF	19,073	32.63%	231,807	35.43%	4,173,185	40.15%
Other Parties (with < 1%)	1,365	2.34%	9,880	1.51%	204,494	1.97%
Valid Votes	58,456	99.28%	654,249	99.31%	10,393,613	99.03%
Rejected Votes	423	0.72%	4,541	0.69%	101,838	0.97%
Total Polled	58,879	78.51%	658,790	79.05%	10,495,451	66.70%
Registered Electors	74,991		833,360		15,734,587	

=== 2005 Sri Lankan Presidential Election ===
Party	Bulathsinhala		Kalutara Electoral District		Sri Lanka	
Party	Votes	%	Votes	%	Votes	%
UPFA	29,218	52.01%	341,693	55.48%	4,887,152	50.29%
UNP	25,918	46.13%	266,043	43.20%	4,706,366	48.43%
Other Parties (with < 1%)	1,043	1.86%	8,124	1.32%	123,521	1.27%
Valid Votes	56,179	98.87%	615,860	98.95%	9,717,039	98.88%
Rejected Votes	644	1.13%	6,517	1.05%	109,869	1.12%
Total Polled	56,823	79.94%	622,377	79.67%	9,826,908	69.51%
Registered Electors	71,080		781,175		14,136,979	

=== 1999 Sri Lankan Presidential Election ===
Party	Bulathsinhala		Kalutara Electoral District		Sri Lanka	
Party	Votes	%	Votes	%	Votes	%
PA	25,424	50.25%	281,217	52.88%	4,312,157	51.12%
UNP	22,879	45.22%	217,423	40.88%	3,602,748	42.71%
JVP	1,397	2.76%	23,770	4.47%	343,927	4.08%
Other Parties (with < 1%)	897	1.77%	9,399	1.77%	176,679	2.09%
Valid Votes	50,597	98.08%	531,809	97.83%	8,435,754	97.69%
Rejected Votes	991	1.92%	11,796	2.17%	199,536	2.31%
Total Polled	51,588	77.91%	543,605	78.23%	8,635,290	72.17%
Registered Electors	66,212		694,860		11,965,536	

=== 1994 Sri Lankan Presidential Election ===
Party	Bulathsinhala		Kalutara Electoral District		Sri Lanka	
Party	Votes	%	Votes	%	Votes	%
PA	27,072	56.52%	295,686	61.47%	4,709,205	62.28%
UNP	20,094	41.95%	178,466	37.10%	2,715,283	35.91%
Other Parties (with < 1%)	729	1.52%	6,867	1.43%	137,040	1.81%
Valid Votes	47,895	98.41%	481,019	98.50%	7,561,526	98.03%
Rejected Votes	772	1.59%	7,309	1.50%	151,706	1.97%
Total Polled	48,667	77.09%	488,328	73.97%	7,713,232	69.12%
Registered Electors	63,131		660,191		11,158,880	

=== 1988 Sri Lankan Presidential Election ===
Party	Bulathsinhala		Kalutara Electoral District		Sri Lanka	
Party	Votes	%	Votes	%	Votes	%
UNP	18,705	49.30%	169,510	46.74%	2,569,199	50.43%
SLFP	18,491	48.74%	179,761	49.57%	2,289,857	44.95%
SLMP	743	1.96%	13,375	3.69%	235,701	4.63%
Valid Votes	37,939	97.73%	362,646	98.23%	5,094,754	98.24%
Rejected Votes	880	2.27%	6,537	1.77%	91,499	1.76%
Total Polled	38,819	66.89%	369,183	64.20%	5,186,256	55.87%
Registered Electors	58,030		575,008		9,283,143	

=== 1982 Sri Lankan Presidential Election ===
Party	Bulathsinhala		Kalutara Electoral District		Sri Lanka	
Party	Votes	%	Votes	%	Votes	%
UNP	21,486	49.74%	211,592	50.15%	3,450,815	52.93%
SLFP	20,068	46.46%	185,874	44.06%	2,546,348	39.05%
JVP	998	2.31%	14,499	3.44%	273,428	4.19%
LSSP	521	1.21%	8,613	2.04%	58,531	0.90%
Other Parties (with < 1%)	121	0.28%	1,314	0.31%	190,929	2.93%
Valid Votes	43,194	98.67%	421,892	98.76%	6,520,156	98.78%
Rejected Votes	582	1.33%	5,290	1.24%	80,470	1.22%
Total Polled	43,776	85.34%	427,182	83.97%	6,600,626	80.15%
Registered Electors	51,297		508,744		8,235,358	

== Parliamentary Election Results ==
=== Summary ===
The winner of Bulathsinhala has matched the final country result 6 out of 7 times. Hence, Bulathsinhala is a Strong Bellwether for Parliamentary Elections.

Year	Bulathsinhala	Kalutara Electoral District	MAE %	Sri Lanka	MAE %
2015	UPFA	UPFA	2.39%	UNP	5.31%
2010	UPFA	UPFA	3.68%	UPFA	5.67%
2004	UPFA	UPFA	4.10%	UPFA	4.52%
2001	UNP	UNP	1.85%	UNP	3.12%
2000	PA	PA	2.77%	PA	3.23%
1994	PA	PA	4.23%	PA	2.64%
1989	UNP	UNP	3.24%	UNP	5.64%
Matches/Mean MAE	6/7	6/7	3.18%	7/7	4.31%

=== 2015 Sri Lankan Parliamentary Election ===
Party	Bulathsinhala		Kalutara Electoral District		Sri Lanka	
Party	Votes	%	Votes	%	Votes	%
UPFA	31,612	52.26%	338,801	48.58%	4,732,664	42.48%
UNP	26,254	43.41%	310,234	44.48%	5,098,916	45.77%
JVP	2,052	3.39%	38,475	5.52%	544,154	4.88%
Other Parties (with < 1%)	568	0.94%	9,951	1.43%	85,579	0.77%
Valid Votes	60,486	96.23%	697,461	97.00%	11,140,333	95.35%
Rejected Votes	2,340	3.72%	21,366	2.97%	516,926	4.42%
Total Polled	62,853	76.54%	719,001	80.13%	11,684,111	77.66%
Registered Electors	82,123		897,349		15,044,490	

=== 2010 Sri Lankan Parliamentary Election ===
Party	Bulathsinhala		Kalutara Electoral District		Sri Lanka	
Party	Votes	%	Votes	%	Votes	%
UPFA	29,522	68.58%	313,836	63.74%	4,846,388	60.38%
UNP	11,737	27.26%	139,596	28.35%	2,357,057	29.37%
DNA	1,577	3.66%	36,722	7.46%	441,251	5.50%
Other Parties (with < 1%)	213	0.49%	2,246	0.46%	34,923	0.44%
Valid Votes	43,049	88.17%	492,400	90.41%	8,026,322	96.03%
Rejected Votes	5,734	11.74%	51,751	9.50%	581,465	6.96%
Total Polled	48,827	65.11%	544,606	65.21%	8,358,246	59.29%
Registered Electors	74,991		835,186		14,097,690	

=== 2004 Sri Lankan Parliamentary Election ===
Party	Bulathsinhala		Kalutara Electoral District		Sri Lanka	
Party	Votes	%	Votes	%	Votes	%
UPFA	25,374	49.77%	291,208	51.72%	4,223,126	45.70%
UNP	22,767	44.65%	212,721	37.78%	3,486,792	37.73%
JHU	2,621	5.14%	56,615	10.06%	552,723	5.98%
Other Parties (with < 1%)	225	0.44%	2,475	0.44%	49,030	0.53%
Valid Votes	50,987	93.19%	563,019	94.82%	9,241,931	94.52%
Rejected Votes	3,728	6.81%	30,741	5.18%	534,452	5.47%
Total Polled	54,715	78.48%	593,760	79.58%	9,777,821	75.74%
Registered Electors	69,720		746,138		12,909,631	

=== 2001 Sri Lankan Parliamentary Election ===
Party	Bulathsinhala		Kalutara Electoral District		Sri Lanka	
Party	Votes	%	Votes	%	Votes	%
UNP	24,592	48.75%	254,339	45.94%	4,086,026	45.62%
PA	20,909	41.45%	226,468	40.91%	3,330,815	37.19%
JVP	3,976	7.88%	60,451	10.92%	815,353	9.10%
Other Parties (with < 1%)	969	1.92%	12,361	2.23%	137,091	1.53%
Valid Votes	50,446	93.12%	553,619	94.44%	8,955,844	94.77%
Rejected Votes	3,730	6.88%	32,617	5.56%	494,009	5.23%
Total Polled	54,176	79.91%	586,236	81.68%	9,449,878	76.03%
Registered Electors	67,795		717,764		12,428,762	

=== 2000 Sri Lankan Parliamentary Election ===
Party	Bulathsinhala		Kalutara Electoral District		Sri Lanka	
Party	Votes	%	Votes	%	Votes	%
PA	24,308	47.87%	255,175	46.86%	3,899,329	45.33%
UNP	22,812	44.92%	217,215	39.89%	3,451,765	40.12%
JVP	2,037	4.01%	38,373	7.05%	518,725	6.03%
Other Parties (with < 1%)	1,028	2.02%	18,136	3.33%	321,730	3.74%
SU	597	1.18%	15,619	2.87%	127,859	1.49%
Valid Votes	50,782	N/A	544,518	N/A	8,602,617	N/A

=== 1994 Sri Lankan Parliamentary Election ===
Party	Bulathsinhala		Kalutara Electoral District		Sri Lanka	
Party	Votes	%	Votes	%	Votes	%
PA	24,364	50.04%	271,754	53.77%	3,887,805	48.94%
UNP	23,755	48.79%	221,115	43.75%	3,498,370	44.04%
Other Parties (with < 1%)	566	1.16%	12,491	2.47%	159,429	2.01%
Valid Votes	48,685	93.98%	505,360	95.21%	7,943,688	95.20%
Rejected Votes	3,121	6.02%	25,397	4.79%	400,395	4.80%
Total Polled	51,806	82.06%	530,757	80.20%	8,344,095	74.75%
Registered Electors	63,131		661,793		11,163,064	

=== 1989 Sri Lankan Parliamentary Election ===
Party	Bulathsinhala		Kalutara Electoral District		Sri Lanka	
Party	Votes	%	Votes	%	Votes	%
UNP	16,360	55.80%	160,069	49.84%	2,838,005	50.71%
SLFP	12,024	41.01%	131,510	40.94%	1,785,369	31.90%
Other Parties (with < 1%)	616	2.10%	16,643	5.18%	300,186	5.36%
SLMC	321	1.09%	12,971	4.04%	202,016	3.61%
Valid Votes	29,321	92.25%	321,193	94.10%	5,596,468	93.87%
Rejected Votes	2,463	7.75%	20,139	5.90%	365,563	6.13%
Total Polled	31,784	55.65%	341,332	59.86%	5,962,031	63.60%
Registered Electors	57,111		570,193		9,374,164	

== Demographics ==
=== Ethnicity ===
The Bulathsinhala Polling Division has a Sinhalese majority (87.3%) . In comparison, the Kalutara Electoral District (which contains the Bulathsinhala Polling Division) has a Sinhalese majority (86.8%)

Ethnicity in Bulathsinhala
1. Sinhalese (87.3%)
2. Indian Tamil (5.70%)
3. Sri Lankan Tamil (4.70%)
4. Moor (2.30%)
5. Other (0.00%)

=== Religion ===
The Bulathsinhala Polling Division has a Buddhist majority (87.0%) . In comparison, the Kalutara Electoral District (which contains the Bulathsinhala Polling Division) has a Buddhist majority (83.4%)

Religion in Bulathsinhala
1. Buddhist (87.0%)
2. Hindu (9.30%)
3. Muslim (2.30%)
4. Other (1.30%)
