= Madurawela Divisional Secretariat =

- Divisional Secretariat
- Interactive map of Madurawela Divisional Secretariat
- Country: Sri Lanka
- Province: Western Province
- District: Kalutara District
- Time zone: UTC+5:30 (Sri Lanka Standard Time)

Madurawela Divisional Secretariat is a Divisional Secretariat of Kalutara District, of Western Province, Sri Lanka.

== Demography ==
Religion in Madurawela DS Division (2012)
1. Buddhist (91.3%)
2. Hindu (7.80%)
3. Muslim (0.10%)
4. Roman Catholic (0.40%)
5. Other Christian (0.40%)
6. Other (0.00%)
