= Bandaragama Divisional Secretariat =

- Divisional Secretariat
- Location within Sri Lanka
- Country: Sri Lanka
- Province: Western Province
- District: Kalutara District
- Time zone: UTC+5:30 (Sri Lanka Standard Time)

Bandaragama Divisional Secretariat is a Divisional Secretariat of Kalutara District, of Western Province, Sri Lanka.

== Demography ==
Religion in Bandaragama DS Division (2012)
1. Buddhist (85.8%)
2. Hindu (0.30%)
3. Muslim (11.2%)
4. Roman Catholic (1.90%)
5. Other Christian (0.80%)
6. Other (0.00%)
