= Horana Polling Division =

Horana
- Polling Division
- Coordinates: 6.759685°N 80.086365°E
- Country: Sri Lanka
- Province: Western Province, Sri Lanka
- Electoral District: Kalutara Electoral District

Area
  - Total: 218.99 km^{2} (84.55 sq mi)

Population (2012)
  - Total: 167,260
  - Density: 764/km^{2} (1,980/sq mi)
- ISO 3166 code: EC-03C

The Horana Polling Division is a Polling Division in the Kalutara Electoral District, in the Western Province, Sri Lanka.

== Presidential Election Results ==
=== Summary ===
The winner of Horana has matched the final country result 6 out of 8 times. Hence, Horana is a Weak Bellwether for Presidential Elections.

Year	Horana	Kalutara Electoral District	MAE %	Sri Lanka	MAE %
2019	SLPP	SLPP	4.50%	SLPP	11.18%
2015	UPFA	UPFA	4.61%	NDF	9.48%
2010	UPFA	UPFA	3.21%	UPFA	8.08%
2005	UPFA	UPFA	0.41%	UPFA	5.55%
1999	PA	PA	1.15%	PA	2.79%
1994	PA	PA	0.18%	PA	1.11%
1988	SLFP	SLFP	1.14%	UNP	2.89%
1982	UNP	UNP	1.05%	UNP	3.12%
Matches/Mean MAE	6/8	6/8	2.03%	8/8	5.53%

=== 2019 Sri Lankan Presidential Election ===
Party	Horana		Kalutara Electoral District		Sri Lanka	
Party	Votes	%	Votes	%	Votes	%
SLPP	69,822	64.30%	482,920	59.49%	6,924,255	52.25%
NDF	32,967	30.36%	284,213	35.01%	5,564,239	41.99%
NMPP	3,532	3.25%	27,681	3.41%	418,553	3.16%
Other Parties (with < 1%)	2,262	2.08%	16,949	2.09%	345,452	2.61%
Valid Votes	108,583	99.19%	811,763	99.16%	13,252,499	98.99%
Rejected Votes	883	0.81%	6,847	0.84%	135,452	1.01%
Total Polled	109,466	85.52%	818,610	85.71%	13,387,951	83.71%
Registered Electors	128,005		955,080		15,992,568	

=== 2015 Sri Lankan Presidential Election ===
Party	Horana		Kalutara Electoral District		Sri Lanka	
Party	Votes	%	Votes	%	Votes	%
UPFA	57,633	57.34%	395,890	52.65%	5,768,090	47.58%
NDF	42,065	41.85%	349,404	46.46%	6,217,162	51.28%
Other Parties (with < 1%)	819	0.81%	6,690	0.89%	138,200	1.14%
Valid Votes	100,517	99.06%	751,984	98.90%	12,123,452	98.85%
Rejected Votes	952	0.94%	8,381	1.10%	140,925	1.15%
Total Polled	101,469	82.82%	760,365	82.08%	12,264,377	78.69%
Registered Electors	122,511		926,346		15,585,942	

=== 2010 Sri Lankan Presidential Election ===
Party	Horana		Kalutara Electoral District		Sri Lanka	
Party	Votes	%	Votes	%	Votes	%
UPFA	57,292	66.34%	412,562	63.06%	6,015,934	57.88%
NDF	27,818	32.21%	231,807	35.43%	4,173,185	40.15%
Other Parties (with < 1%)	1,256	1.45%	9,880	1.51%	204,494	1.97%
Valid Votes	86,366	99.23%	654,249	99.31%	10,393,613	99.03%
Rejected Votes	666	0.77%	4,541	0.69%	101,838	0.97%
Total Polled	87,032	80.01%	658,790	79.05%	10,495,451	66.70%
Registered Electors	108,781		833,360		15,734,587	

=== 2005 Sri Lankan Presidential Election ===
Party	Horana		Kalutara Electoral District		Sri Lanka	
Party	Votes	%	Votes	%	Votes	%
UPFA	44,801	55.94%	341,693	55.48%	4,887,152	50.29%
UNP	34,300	42.83%	266,043	43.20%	4,706,366	48.43%
Other Parties (with < 1%)	988	1.23%	8,124	1.32%	123,521	1.27%
Valid Votes	80,089	99.01%	615,860	98.95%	9,717,039	98.88%
Rejected Votes	802	0.99%	6,517	1.05%	109,869	1.12%
Total Polled	80,891	80.82%	622,377	79.67%	9,826,908	69.51%
Registered Electors	100,085		781,175		14,136,979	

=== 1999 Sri Lankan Presidential Election ===
Party	Horana		Kalutara Electoral District		Sri Lanka	
Party	Votes	%	Votes	%	Votes	%
PA	37,559	54.40%	281,217	52.88%	4,312,157	51.12%
UNP	27,700	40.12%	217,423	40.88%	3,602,748	42.71%
JVP	2,648	3.84%	23,770	4.47%	343,927	4.08%
Other Parties (with < 1%)	1,133	1.64%	9,399	1.77%	176,679	2.09%
Valid Votes	69,040	97.99%	531,809	97.83%	8,435,754	97.69%
Rejected Votes	1,417	2.01%	11,796	2.17%	199,536	2.31%
Total Polled	70,457	81.28%	543,605	78.23%	8,635,290	72.17%
Registered Electors	86,680		694,860		11,965,536	

=== 1994 Sri Lankan Presidential Election ===
Party	Horana		Kalutara Electoral District		Sri Lanka	
Party	Votes	%	Votes	%	Votes	%
PA	36,064	61.21%	295,686	61.47%	4,709,205	62.28%
UNP	21,886	37.14%	178,466	37.10%	2,715,283	35.91%
Other Parties (with < 1%)	972	1.65%	6,867	1.43%	137,040	1.81%
Valid Votes	58,922	98.44%	481,019	98.50%	7,561,526	98.03%
Rejected Votes	932	1.56%	7,309	1.50%	151,706	1.97%
Total Polled	59,854	76.86%	488,328	73.97%	7,713,232	69.12%
Registered Electors	77,877		660,191		11,158,880	

=== 1988 Sri Lankan Presidential Election ===
Party	Horana		Kalutara Electoral District		Sri Lanka	
Party	Votes	%	Votes	%	Votes	%
SLFP	24,116	48.89%	179,761	49.57%	2,289,857	44.95%
UNP	23,868	48.39%	169,510	46.74%	2,569,199	50.43%
SLMP	1,339	2.71%	13,375	3.69%	235,701	4.63%
Valid Votes	49,323	98.73%	362,646	98.23%	5,094,754	98.24%
Rejected Votes	632	1.27%	6,537	1.77%	91,499	1.76%
Total Polled	49,955	71.98%	369,183	64.20%	5,186,256	55.87%
Registered Electors	69,405		575,008		9,283,143	

=== 1982 Sri Lankan Presidential Election ===
Party	Horana		Kalutara Electoral District		Sri Lanka	
Party	Votes	%	Votes	%	Votes	%
UNP	27,056	51.51%	211,592	50.15%	3,450,815	52.93%
SLFP	23,518	44.77%	185,874	44.06%	2,546,348	39.05%
JVP	1,361	2.59%	14,499	3.44%	273,428	4.19%
Other Parties (with < 1%)	593	1.13%	9,927	2.35%	249,460	3.83%
Valid Votes	52,528	99.13%	421,892	98.76%	6,520,156	98.78%
Rejected Votes	459	0.87%	5,290	1.24%	80,470	1.22%
Total Polled	52,987	86.36%	427,182	83.97%	6,600,626	80.15%
Registered Electors	61,356		508,744		8,235,358	

== Parliamentary Election Results ==
=== Summary ===
The winner of Horana has matched the final country result 5 out of 7 times. Hence, Horana is a Weak Bellwether for Parliamentary Elections.

Year	Horana	Kalutara Electoral District	MAE %	Sri Lanka	MAE %
2015	UPFA	UPFA	5.03%	UNP	7.95%
2010	UPFA	UPFA	3.44%	UPFA	5.60%
2004	UPFA	UPFA	0.97%	UPFA	3.85%
2001	PA	UNP	2.47%	UNP	3.51%
2000	PA	PA	3.08%	PA	3.69%
1994	PA	PA	1.05%	PA	2.33%
1989	UNP	UNP	4.22%	UNP	4.69%
Matches/Mean MAE	5/7	6/7	2.89%	7/7	4.52%

=== 2015 Sri Lankan Parliamentary Election ===
Party	Horana		Kalutara Electoral District		Sri Lanka	
Party	Votes	%	Votes	%	Votes	%
UPFA	50,024	54.27%	338,801	48.58%	4,732,664	42.48%
UNP	36,325	39.41%	310,234	44.48%	5,098,916	45.77%
JVP	5,037	5.46%	38,475	5.52%	544,154	4.88%
Other Parties (with < 1%)	795	0.86%	9,951	1.43%	85,579	0.77%
Valid Votes	92,181	97.07%	697,461	97.00%	11,140,333	95.35%
Rejected Votes	2,760	2.91%	21,366	2.97%	516,926	4.42%
Total Polled	94,960	77.51%	719,001	80.13%	11,684,111	77.66%
Registered Electors	122,511		897,349		15,044,490	

=== 2010 Sri Lankan Parliamentary Election ===
Party	Horana		Kalutara Electoral District		Sri Lanka	
Party	Votes	%	Votes	%	Votes	%
UPFA	44,136	67.70%	313,836	63.74%	4,846,388	60.38%
UNP	16,613	25.48%	139,596	28.35%	2,357,057	29.37%
DNA	4,020	6.17%	36,722	7.46%	441,251	5.50%
Other Parties (with < 1%)	423	0.65%	2,246	0.46%	34,923	0.44%
Valid Votes	65,192	91.33%	492,400	90.41%	8,026,322	96.03%
Rejected Votes	6,100	8.55%	51,751	9.50%	581,465	6.96%
Total Polled	71,379	65.62%	544,606	65.21%	8,358,246	59.29%
Registered Electors	108,781		835,186		14,097,690	

=== 2004 Sri Lankan Parliamentary Election ===
Party	Horana		Kalutara Electoral District		Sri Lanka	
Party	Votes	%	Votes	%	Votes	%
UPFA	38,421	52.87%	291,208	51.72%	4,223,126	45.70%
UNP	26,764	36.83%	212,721	37.78%	3,486,792	37.73%
JHU	7,166	9.86%	56,615	10.06%	552,723	5.98%
Other Parties (with < 1%)	315	0.43%	2,475	0.44%	49,030	0.53%
Valid Votes	72,666	95.52%	563,019	94.82%	9,241,931	94.52%
Rejected Votes	3,407	4.48%	30,741	5.18%	534,452	5.47%
Total Polled	76,073	78.68%	593,760	79.58%	9,777,821	75.74%
Registered Electors	96,686		746,138		12,909,631	

=== 2001 Sri Lankan Parliamentary Election ===
Party	Horana		Kalutara Electoral District		Sri Lanka	
Party	Votes	%	Votes	%	Votes	%
PA	31,788	44.37%	226,468	40.91%	3,330,815	37.19%
UNP	31,462	43.92%	254,339	45.94%	4,086,026	45.62%
JVP	7,013	9.79%	60,451	10.92%	815,353	9.10%
Other Parties (with < 1%)	1,375	1.92%	12,361	2.23%	137,091	1.53%
Valid Votes	71,638	94.99%	553,619	94.44%	8,955,844	94.77%
Rejected Votes	3,779	5.01%	32,617	5.56%	494,009	5.23%
Total Polled	75,417	82.00%	586,236	81.68%	9,449,878	76.03%
Registered Electors	91,968		717,764		12,428,762	

=== 2000 Sri Lankan Parliamentary Election ===
Party	Horana		Kalutara Electoral District		Sri Lanka	
Party	Votes	%	Votes	%	Votes	%
PA	36,659	52.19%	255,175	46.86%	3,899,329	45.33%
UNP	27,259	38.81%	217,215	39.89%	3,451,765	40.12%
JVP	4,191	5.97%	38,373	7.05%	518,725	6.03%
SU	1,233	1.76%	15,619	2.87%	127,859	1.49%
Other Parties (with < 1%)	900	1.28%	18,136	3.33%	321,730	3.74%
Valid Votes	70,242	N/A	544,518	N/A	8,602,617	N/A

=== 1994 Sri Lankan Parliamentary Election ===
Party	Horana		Kalutara Electoral District		Sri Lanka	
Party	Votes	%	Votes	%	Votes	%
PA	32,374	52.84%	271,754	53.77%	3,887,805	48.94%
UNP	27,562	44.98%	221,115	43.75%	3,498,370	44.04%
MEP	771	1.26%	5,914	1.17%	68,538	0.86%
Other Parties (with < 1%)	565	0.92%	6,577	1.30%	90,891	1.14%
Valid Votes	61,272	95.85%	505,360	95.21%	7,943,688	95.20%
Rejected Votes	2,656	4.15%	25,397	4.79%	400,395	4.80%
Total Polled	63,928	82.09%	530,757	80.20%	8,344,095	74.75%
Registered Electors	77,877		661,793		11,163,064	

=== 1989 Sri Lankan Parliamentary Election ===
Party	Horana		Kalutara Electoral District		Sri Lanka	
Party	Votes	%	Votes	%	Votes	%
UNP	25,770	55.69%	160,069	49.84%	2,838,005	50.71%
SLFP	17,658	38.16%	131,510	40.94%	1,785,369	31.90%
USA	1,778	3.84%	12,342	3.84%	141,983	2.54%
MEP	839	1.81%	2,690	0.84%	90,480	1.62%
Other Parties (with < 1%)	232	0.50%	14,582	4.54%	269,739	4.82%
Valid Votes	46,277	94.14%	321,193	94.10%	5,596,468	93.87%
Rejected Votes	2,883	5.86%	20,139	5.90%	365,563	6.13%
Total Polled	49,160	72.38%	341,332	59.86%	5,962,031	63.60%
Registered Electors	67,915		570,193		9,374,164	

== Demographics ==
=== Ethnicity ===
The Horana Polling Division has a Sinhalese majority (95.3%) . In comparison, the Kalutara Electoral District (which contains the Horana Polling Division) has a Sinhalese majority (86.8%)

Ethnicity in Horana
1. Sinhalese (95.3%)
2. Indian Tamil (3.20%)
3. Sri Lankan Tamil (1.30%)
4. Other (0.20%)

=== Religion ===
The Horana Polling Division has a Buddhist majority (94.5%) . In comparison, the Kalutara Electoral District (which contains the Horana Polling Division) has a Buddhist majority (83.4%)

Religion in Horana
1. Buddhist (94.5%)
2. Hindu (3.70%)
3. Other (1.70%)
