= Kalutara Divisional Secretariat =

- Divisional Secretariat
- Interactive map of Kalutara Divisional Secretariat
- Country: Sri Lanka
- Province: Western Province
- District: Kalutara District
- Time zone: UTC+5:30 (Sri Lanka Standard Time)

Kalutara Divisional Secretariat is a Divisional Secretariat of Kalutara District, of Western Province, Sri Lanka.

== Demography ==
Religion in Kalutara DS Division (2012)
1. Buddhist (84.5%)
2. Hindu (0.90%)
3. Muslim (7.80%)
4. Roman Catholic (6.10%)
5. Other Christian (0.60%)
6. Other (0.00%)
