= Panadura Divisional Secretariat =

- Divisional Secretariat
- Interactive map of Panadura Divisional Secretariat
- Country: Sri Lanka
- Province: Western Province
- District: Kalutara District
- Time zone: UTC+5:30 (Sri Lanka Standard Time)
- Postal code: 12500

Panadura Divisional Secretariat is a Divisional Secretariat of Kalutara District, of Western Province, Sri Lanka.

== Demography ==
Religion in Panadura DS Division (2012)
1. Buddhist (78.6%)
2. Hindu (0.50%)
3. Muslim (14.4%)
4. Roman Catholic (5.10%)
5. Other Christian (1.30%)
6. Other (0.00%)
