= Bulathsinhala Divisional Secretariat =

- Divisional Secretariat
- Interactive map of Bulathsinhala Divisional Secretariat
- Country: Sri Lanka
- Province: Western Province
- District: Kalutara District
- Time zone: UTC+5:30 (Sri Lanka Standard Time)

Bulathsinhala Divisional Secretariat is a Divisional Secretariat of Kalutara District, of Western Province, Sri Lanka.

== Demography ==
Religion in Bulathsinhala DS Division (2012)
1. Buddhist (84.8%)
2. Hindu (10.2%)
3. Muslim (3.50%)
4. Roman Catholic (0.50%)
5. Other Christian (1.00%)
6. Other (0.00%)
