= Beruwala Divisional Secretariat =

- Divisional Secretariat
- Interactive map of Beruwala Divisional Secretariat
- Country: Sri Lanka
- Province: Western Province
- District: Kalutara District
- Time zone: UTC+5:30 (Sri Lanka Standard Time)

Beruwala Divisional Secretariat is a Divisional Secretariat of Kalutara District, of Western Province, Sri Lanka.

== Demography ==
Religion in Beruwala DS Division (2012)
1. Buddhist (55.7%)
2. Hindu (0.80%)
3. Muslim (34.7%)
4. Roman Catholic (8.40%)
5. Other Christian (0.30%)
6. Other (0.00%)
