= Beruwala =

Beruwala බේරුවල பேருவளை
- Town
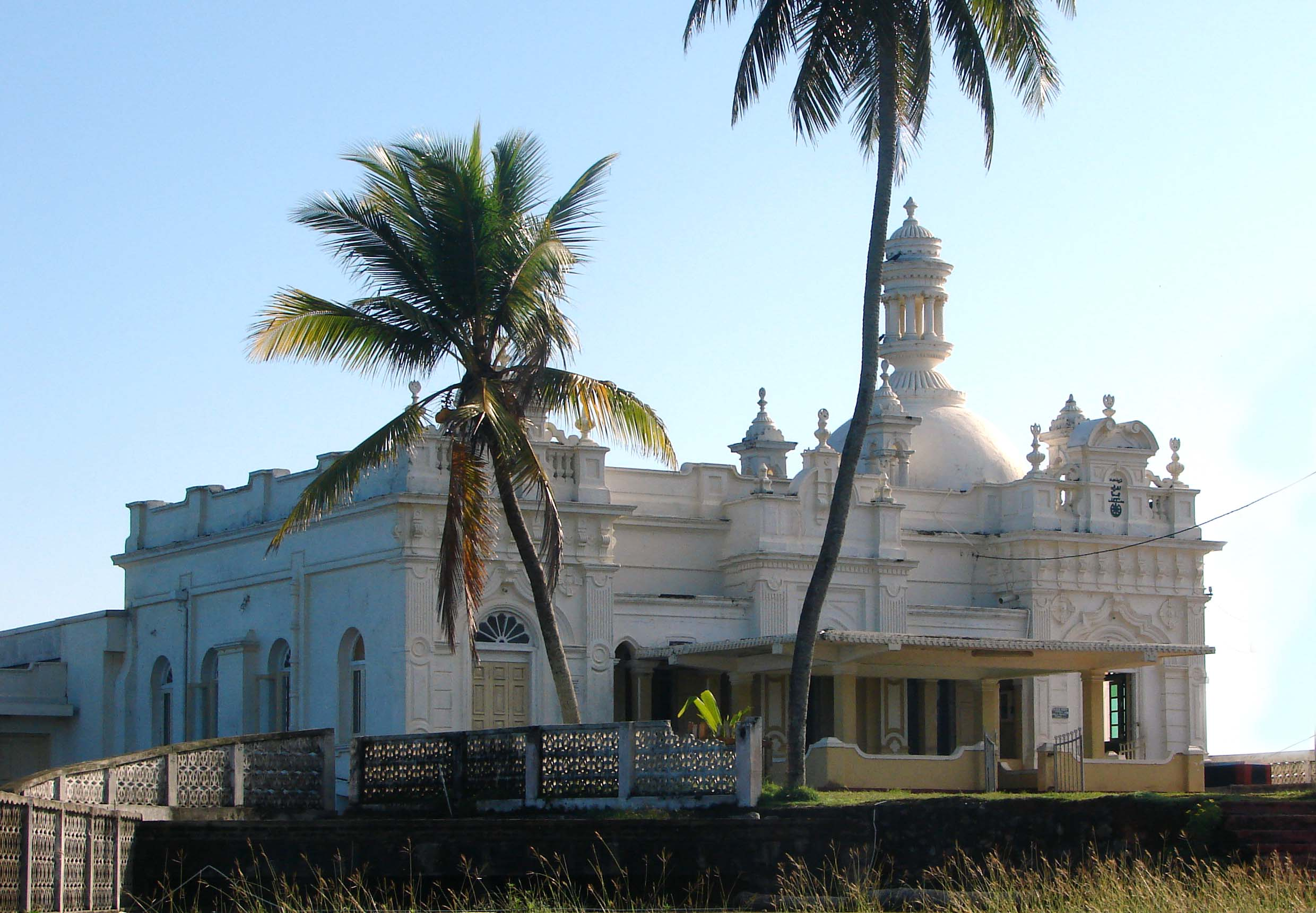
- Kechchimalai Mosque, Beruwala (one of the oldest mosques in Sri Lanka)

- Location in Sri Lanka
- Coordinates: 6°28′N 79°59′E
- Country: Sri Lanka
- Province: Western Province
- District: Kalutara District
- Divisional Secretariat: Beruwala Division

Government
  - Urban Council: Beruwala Urban Council
  - Headquarters: Beruwala UC
  - Mayor of Beruwala: Mohamed Mafasim (NPP)

Population (2012)
  - Urban: 40,083 (Urban Area)
  - Metro: 134,883 (Beruwala Division Area)
- Time zone: UTC+5:30 (Sri Lanka Time)
- Postal code: 12070
- Area code: 034

Beruwala (Sinhala:බේරුවල Tamil: பேருவளை) is a large town in Kalutara District, Western Province, Sri Lanka, governed by an Urban Council. The town covers a total area of approximately 15 km^{2} (5.8 sq mi) and is located on the south-west coast of Sri Lanka, 60 km (37 mi) south of Colombo.

== Etymology ==
The name Beruwala is derived from the Sinhalese word for the place where the sail is lowered. It marks the spot for the first Muslim settlement on the island, established by a Somali Sheikh Yusuf bin Ahmad al-Kawneyn. The town was originally named Berbereen in honour and respect of the Somali Shaikh. The Chinese also traded here and Beruwala was known to them as Piehlo-li.

== History ==
The first Muslim settlement of Sri Lanka was in Beruwala which is situated in the Western coastal area of the Island. Beruwala was named "Berbereen" in the past in honor of Yusuf bin Ahmad al-Kawneyn who is also known as Shaykh Abu Barakat al Barbari, a Somali Muslim scholar and a traveler who founded the city.

As a result of Arabs arriving and settling down in the western coastal areas of Sri Lanka such as Beruwala between the 10th to 12th centuries AD, Beruwala became a popular city for Unani medicine. During the 10th century Prince Jamal-ud-din, the son of Sultan of Konya arrived in Beruwala to practice Unani medicine. Eventually, Unani medicine was spread to many other parts of Sri Lanka and Unani Physicians can still be found in Beruwala and around Sri Lanka at present.

As a result of the relationship between the Muslims and the Sinhalese, Sri Lanka has had a Muslim Ruler called Vathimi Raja, also known as Vathimi Deiyo, who reigned in Kurunegala for a brief period during the 14th century. Vathimi Raja was a son of Buvanekabahu I, who married a Muslim spouse from Beruwala, the daughter of one of the chiefs. Vathimi Raja was first seen by the Arab traveler Ibn Batuta during his visit to Sri Lanka in 1344 while Vathimi Raja's son Parakrama Bahu II (Alkeshwara II) was a Muslim while the lineage of Alkeshwara Kings was ended in 1410.

The Vathimi Rajapura Housing Scheme in Beruwala was built in memory of Vathimi Raja and opened in the 1980's by the local Member of Parliament Alhaj M. A Bakeer Markar when he was then Speaker of the Parliament. M. A Bakeer Markar was once the acting Head of State of Sri Lanka, for a brief period in 1981, when President J. R. Jayewardene and Prime Minister Ranasinghe Premadasa left for England to attend the Royal Wedding of Prince Charles and Lady Diana Spencer.

The Beruwala fishery harbour was destroyed during the 2004 Asian Tsunami and reconstructed by CFHC Awakening of Fishery Harbour project.

== Demographics ==
The population of Beruwala is predominantly Sri Lankan Moors with the Sinhalese being the largest minority, followed by other ethnic groups including Sri Lankan Tamils, and Burghers.

Ethnicity according to Beruwala DS Division Area (2012)

Ethnicity in Beruwala DS Division area
Population	Percent
Sinhalese	64.18%
Sri Lankan Moors	34.59%
Sri Lankan Tamils	0.93%
Indian Tamils	0.15%
Others	0.15%

Source:statistics.gov.lk

== Geography ==
Climate

The climate in Beruwala is tropical. A significant amount of rainfall can be seen in Beruwala during the year. According to Köppen and Geiger, this climate is classified as Af. The average annual temperature is 26.3 °C | 79.3 °F in Beruwala. April being the warmest month, December has the lowest average temperature during the year in Beruwala.

== Attractions ==
- Ketchchimalai Mosque, one of Sri Lanka's oldest mosques, constructed by Arab traders.
- Masjid Al Abrar, claimed to be the first Muslim Mosque of Sri Lanka, built in 920 ADs, presumably by Arab traders who frequented Sri Lanka by sea.
- Barberyn Lighthouse, lighthouse on Barberyn Island.
- Paththe gem market, located in China fort, is one of the country’s open gem markets

== Infrastructure ==
=== Transport ===
==== Roads ====
Beruwala is served by the A2 highway, which runs past the town.

==== Railway ====
Beruwala railway station, is in the Coastal Line, connecting Colombo to Matara and Beliatta.

=== Fishery Harbour ===
Beruwala Fishery Harbour is in the coastal stretch of Beruwala which is a naturally protected area used by merchant vessels for hundreds of years as a Port. It is said that the current Fishery Harbour could have been used as a port since the British Ceylon period.

The Fishery Harbour in Beruwala was initially constructed in 1965 by the Ceylon Fisheries Corporation. And since 1972 the maintenance and operations of the Fishery Harbour is carried out by the Ceylon Fishery Harbours Corporation.

== Education ==
Education institutions in Beruwala have a long history. Beruwala has many schools some of which are government-owned, and others are private. Beruwala has got the first and the oldest Muslim girls School in Sri Lanka which is Al Fasiyathul Nasriya Muslim Balika Navodaya Vidyalaya situated in the coastal area in Maradana, Beruwala. The school was heavily damaged by the tsunami-Indian Ocean earthquake and was repaired subsequently. An Islamic University is situated in Beruwala which is known as Naleemiah Institute of Islamic Studies also known as Jamiah Naleemiah was established in 1974 which provides seven years of Islamic Curriculum along with the Government curriculum.

=== Government Schools ===
- Al Fasiyathul Nasriya Muslim Balika Navodaya Vidyalaya first Muslim ladies college in Sri lanka founded in 1924
- Al Humaisara National School
- Ariyawansha Maha Vidyalaya
- Beruwala Buddhist Junior School
- D. S. Senanayake National School
- I. L. M. Samsudeen Vidyalaya
- Massala Primary School
- Naleem Hajiar Muslim Balika Vidyalaya (National School)
- Zam Refai Hajiar Maha Vidyalaya (National School)

== Government and politics ==
Chairman Mafazim Azahir

Vice Chairman Wimalasiri Silva

Opposition Leader Azam Faleel

Local government

Beruwala is governed by an urban council. Beruwala Urban area was previously divided into two as Beruwala Western Urban Area and Beruwala Eastern Urban Area. It was during the year 1950 both Western and Eastern Urban areas were merged into one urban area initiated by M. A. Bakeer Markar who was a proctor of the Supreme Court at the time who also became the president of the Kalutara Bar Association and who became the chairman of Beruwala Urban Council in the year 1950.

The chairman and council members are elected through local government elections held once in four years. During the past, the Council has been controlled by the United National Party and the Sri Lanka Freedom Party. Following the 2018 Local Authority elections, an independent alignment supported by Mazahim Mohamed, Marjan Faleel, and Milfer Caffoor won the elections. Mazahim Mohamed was subsequently appointed the chairman and Munawar Rafaideen as vice chairman of Beruwala Urban Council.

In 2025, local authority elections, an independent alignment supported by Faleel, secured seven seats while the rest of the parties secured nine seats. However, the National People’s Power (NPP) secured the chairmanship of the Beruwala Urban Council with the support of Samagi Jana Balawegaya (SJB), despite holding only three seats appointing Mafasim Azahir as the Chairman.

The council provides sewer, road, and waste management services. The urban council liaises with the water supply and drainage board, the Ceylon electricity board and telephone service providers for water, electricity, and telephone utility services.

City limits

Beruwala is divided into nine wards or divisions.

Ward number	Ward name
1	Polkotuwa
2	Akkaragoda
3	Cheenakotuwa
4	Kankanamgoda
5	Maligahena
6	Hettiyakanda
7	Maradana
8	Gorakaduwa
9	Mahagoda

== Twin towns and sister cities ==
Beruwala is twinned with:

- Reading, United Kingdom [2004]
