= Kalutara District =

Kalutara District කළුතර දිස්ත්‍රික්කය களுத்துறை மாவட்டம்
- Administrative District
- Location within Sri Lanka
- Coordinates: 06°35′N 80°10′E
- Country: Sri Lanka
- Province: Western
- Capital: Kalutara
- Largest City: Kalutara
- Major Cities: List: * Panadura; * Beruwala
- DS Division: List: Agalawatta; Bandaragama; Beruwala; Bulathsinhala; Dodangoda; Horana; Ingiriya; Kalutara; Madurawela; Matugama; Millaniya; Palindanuwara; Panadura; Walallavita

Government
  - District Secretary: S. K. Henadeera

Area
  - Total: 1,598 km^{2} (617 sq mi)
  - Land: 1,576 km^{2} (608 sq mi)
  - Water: 22 km^{2} (8.5 sq mi) 1.38%
  - Rank: 20th (2.44% of total area)

Population (2012 census)
  - Total: 1,217,260
  - Rank: 5th (6.01% of total pop.)
  - Density: 772.4/km^{2} (2,000/sq mi)

Ethnicity (2012 census)
  - Sinhalese: 1,054,991 (86.67%)
  - Sri Lankan Moors: 112,276 (9.22%)
  - Sri Lankan Tamil: 24,362 (2.00%)
  - Indian Tamil: 23,611 (1.94%)
  - Other: 2,020 (0.17%)

Religion (2012 census)
  - Buddhist: 1,016,632 (83.52%)
  - Muslim: 114,422 (9.40%)
  - Christian: 46,109 (3.79%)
  - Hindu: 39,773 (3.27%)
  - Other: 324 (0.03%)
- Time zone: UTC+05:30 (Sri Lanka)
- Post Codes: 12000-12999
- Telephone Codes: 034, 038
- ISO 3166 code: LK-13
- Vehicle registration: WP
- Official Languages: Sinhala, Tamil
- Website: Kalutara District Secretariat

Kalutara District (Sinhala: කළුතර දිස්ත්‍රික්කය; Tamil: களுத்துறை மாவட்டம் Kaḷuttuṟai Māvaṭṭam) is one of the 25 districts of Sri Lanka, the second level administrative division of the country. The district is administered by a District Secretariat headed by a District Secretary (previously known as a Government Agent) appointed by the central government of Sri Lanka. The capital of the district is the city of Kalutara .

== Geography ==
Kalutara District is located in the south-west of Sri Lanka and has an area of 1,598 square kilometres (617 sq mi). It is bounded by Colombo District in the north, Ratnapura District in the east, Galle District in the south, and the Indian Ocean in the west.

== Administrative units ==
Kalutara District is divided into 14 Divisional Secretary's Division (DS Divisions), each headed by a Divisional Secretary (previously known as an Assistant Government Agent). The DS Divisions are further sub-divided into 762 Grama Niladhari Divisions (GN Divisions).

DS Division	Main Town	Divisional Secretary	GN Divisions	Area (km^{2})	Population (2012 Census)						Population Density (/km^{2})
DS Division	Main Town	Divisional Secretary	GN Divisions	Area (km^{2})	Sinhalese	Sri Lankan Moors	Sri Lankan Tamil	Indian Tamil	Other	Total	Population Density (/km^{2})
Agalawatta	Agalawatta	H. A. K. Pushpakumara	34	88	35,456	71	102	810	17	36,456	414
Bandaragama	Bandaragama	M. A. T. Senarath	59	56	96,032	11,887	364	378	228	108,889	1,944
Beruwala	Beruwala	Janaka Sri Chandaguptha	82	69	105,351	56,741	1,543	666	206	164,507	2,384
Bulathsinhala	Bulathsinhala	Irangani Weerasinghe	54	206	54,635	2,223	4,236	3,513	28	64,635	314
Dodangoda	Dodangoda	Thilanka Wettasinha	45	114	56,405	35	3,636	3,583	46	63,705	559
Horana	Horana	K. A. D. R. N. Jayasinghe	61	109	110,122	94	698	1,329	198	112,441	1,032
Ingiriya	Ingiriya	Champa Upasena	31	90	48,155	13	1,978	3,452	47	53,645	596
Kalutara	Kalutara	Wimal Gunathunga	87	69	144,457	12,428	1,844	159	337	159,225	2,308
Madurawela	Madurawela	Menaka Priyantha Abeyrathna	33	59	31,345	9	506	2,363	22	34,245	580
Matugama	Matugama	W. S. M. K. Silva	57	128	70,612	2,819	5,325	2,209	99	81,064	633
Millaniya	Millaniya	Wimal Gunathunga	44	81	50,465	41	80	1,461	31	52,078	643
Palindanuwara	Baduraliya	Tharani Anoja Gamage	43	276	45,492	577	1,755	2,548	10	50,382	183
Panadura	Panadura	K. G. Wijayasiri	72	44	153,840	25,328	1,556	263	737	181,724	4,130
Walallavita	Walallavita	Dashitha Niroshana	60	209	52,624	10	739	877	14	54,264	260
Total			762	1,598	1,054,991	112,276	24,362	23,611	2,020	1,217,260	762

== Demographics ==
=== Population ===
Kalutara District's population was 1,217,260 in 2012. The majority of the population are Sinhalese, with a minority Sri Lankan Moor and Sri Lankan Tamil population.

=== Ethnicity ===
Ethnicity in Kalutara District (2024)
1. Sinhala (85.7%)
2. Sri Lankan Moors (10.4%)
3. Sri Lankan Tamils (3.17%)
4. Others (0.68%)

Population of Kalutara District by ethnic group 1946 to 2012
Year	Sinhalese		Sri Lankan Moors		Sri Lankan Tamil		Indian Tamil		Other		Total No.
Year	No.	%	No.	%	No.	%	No.	%	No.	%	Total No.
1946 Census	n/a	n/a	n/a	n/a	n/a	n/a	n/a	n/a	n/a	n/a	456,572
1953 Census	n/a	n/a	n/a	n/a	n/a	n/a	n/a	n/a	n/a	n/a	523,550
1963 Census	n/a	n/a	n/a	n/a	n/a	n/a	n/a	n/a	n/a	n/a	631,457
1971 Census	n/a	n/a	n/a	n/a	n/a	n/a	n/a	n/a	n/a	n/a	729,514
1981 Census	723,483	87.20%	61,159	7.37%	9,744	1.17%	33,659	4.06%	1,659	0.20%	829,704
2001 Census	928,914	87.12%	93,293	8.75%	12,665	1.19%	28,895	2.71%	2,472	0.23%	1,066,239
2012 Census	1,054,991	86.67%	112,276	9.22%	24,362	2.00%	23,611	1.94%	2,020	0.17%	1,217,260

=== Religion ===
Religion in Kalutara district (2024)
Religion	Percent
Buddhism	82.76%
Islam	10.59%
Hinduism	3.26%
Catholicism	2.80%
Other Christianity	0.59%
Other or not stated	0.01%

Population of Kalutara District by religion 1981 to 2012
Year	Buddhist		Muslim		Christian (Note: Roman Catholic and Other Christian.)		Hindu		Other		Total No.
Year	No.	%	No.	%	No.	%	No.	%	No.	%	Total No.
1981 Census	699,613	84.32%	62,659	7.55%	30,121	3.63%	37,035	4.46%	276	0.03%	829,704
2001 Census	883,968	82.91%	105,957	9.94%	41,214	3.87%	34,678	3.25%	422	0.04%	1,066,239
2012 Census	1,016,632	83.52%	114,422	9.40%	46,109	3.79%	39,773	3.27%	324	0.03%	1,217,260

== See also ==
- Kithulgoda
