= Kalutara Electoral District =

Electoral district of Sri Lanka

Kalutara
- Electoral District for the Parliament of Sri Lanka
- Administrative District: Kalutara
- Province: Western
- Polling divisions: 8
- Population: 1,118,000 (2008)
- Electorate: 813,233 (2010)
- Area: 1,598 km^{2} (617 sq mi)

Current Electoral District
- Number of members: 11
- MPs: NPP (8) Nalinda Jayatissa; Nilanthi Kottahachchi; Nihal Abeysinghe; Sanjeewa Ranasinghe; Dhanushka Ranganath; Oshani Umanga; Chandima Hettiaratchi; Nandana Padmakumara SJB (2) Ajith Perera; Jagath Vithana NDF (1) Rohitha Abeygunawardena

Kalutara electoral district is one of the 22 multi-member electoral districts of Sri Lanka created by the 1978 Constitution of Sri Lanka. The district is conterminous with the administrative district of Kalutara in the Western province. The district currently elects 10 of the 225 members of the Sri Lankan Parliament and had 813,233 registered electors in 2010. The district is Sri Lanka's Electorate Number 03.

== Polling Divisions ==
The Kalutara Electoral District consists of the following polling divisions:

A: Panadura

B: Bandaragama

C: Horana

D: Bulathsinhala

E: Matugama

F: Kalutara

G: Beruwala

H: Agalawatta

== Presidential elections ==
=== 1982 presidential election ===
Results of the 1st presidential election held on 20 October 1982:

Candidate	Party	Votes per Polling Division								Postal Votes	Total Votes	%
Candidate	Party	Agalawatta	Bandaragama	Beruwala	Bulathsinhala	Horana	Kalutara	Mathugama	Panadura	Postal Votes	Total Votes	%
Junius; Jayewardene	UNP	25,681	26,631	27,951	21,486	27,056	26,167	24,494	26,648	5,478	211,592	50.15%
Hector; Kobbekaduwa	SLFP	21,041	25,500	22,349	20,068	23,518	22,992	23,154	23,861	3,391	185,874	44.06%
Rohana; Wijeweera	JVP	2,043	1,583	1,812	998	1,361	2,306	2,164	2,011	221	14,499	3.44%
Colvin R. de Silva	LSSP	2,079	730	608	521	359	1,707	537	1,776	296	8,613	2.04%
Vasudeva; Nanayakkara	NSSP	79	81	42	57	186	112	89	189	36	871	0.21%
Kumar; Ponnambalam	ACTC	80	35	39	64	48	39	107	27	4	443	0.11%
Valid Votes		51,003	54,560	52,801	43,194	52,528	53,323	50,545	54,512	9,426	421,892	100.00%
Rejected Votes		944	628	544	582	459	612	741	677	103	5,290	
Total Polled		51,947	55,188	53,345	43,776	52,987	53,935	51,286	55,189	9,529	427,182	
Registered Electors		62,890	65,013	64,357	51,297	61,356	64,944	61,809	67,549		499,215	
Turnout		82.60%	84.89%	82.89%	85.34%	86.36%	83.05%	82.97%	81.70%		85.57%	

=== 1988 presidential election ===
Results of the 2nd presidential election held on 19 December 1988:

Candidate	Party	Votes per Polling Division								Postal Votes	Total Votes	%
Candidate	Party	Agalawatta	Bandaragama	Beruwala	Bulathsinhala	Horana	Kalutara	Mathugama	Panadura	Postal Votes	Total Votes	%
Sirimavo; Bandaranaike	SLFP	15,255	26,897	21,920	18,491	24,116	22,425	19,908	28,366	2,383	179,761	49.57%
Ranasinghe; Premadasa	UNP	15,155	26,066	20,529	18,705	23,868	22,551	17,917	22,701	2,018	169,510	46.74%
Ossie; Abeygunasekara	SLMP	905	2,261	952	743	1,339	2,559	836	3,548	232	13,375	3.69%
Valid Votes		31,315	55,224	43,401	37,939	49,323	47,535	38,661	54,615	4,633	362,646	100.00%
Rejected Votes		521	871	700	880	632	1,161	716	799	257	6,537	
Total Polled		31,836	56,095	44,101	38,819	49,955	48,696	39,377	55,414	4,890	369,183	
Registered Electors		70,991	73,585	73,408	58,030	69,405	75,912	70,457	78,330		570,118	
Turnout		44.85%	76.23%	60.08%	66.89%	71.98%	64.15%	55.89%	70.74%		64.76%	

=== 1994 presidential election ===
Results of the 3rd presidential election held on 9 November 1994:

Candidate	Party	Votes per Polling Division								Postal Votes	Total Votes	%
Candidate	Party	Agalawatta	Bandaragama	Beruwala	Bulathsinhala	Horana	Kalutara	Mathugama	Panadura	Postal Votes	Total Votes	%
Chandrika; Kumaratunga	PA	32,467	40,503	36,364	27,072	36,064	37,490	33,726	42,951	9,049	295,686	61.47%
Srima; Dissanayake	UNP	21,903	23,655	23,487	20,094	21,886	22,209	20,667	20,032	4,533	178,466	37.10%
Hudson; Samarasinghe	Ind 2	322	315	246	281	351	237	286	166	9	2,213	0.46%
Harischandra; Wijayatunga	SMBP	190	263	115	172	262	226	202	340	98	1,868	0.39%
A. J. Ranasinghe	Ind 1	163	187	135	131	212	170	168	198	34	1,398	0.29%
Nihal; Galappaththi	SLPF	201	177	153	145	147	161	201	161	42	1,388	0.29%
Valid Votes		55,246	65,100	60,500	47,895	58,922	60,493	55,250	63,848	13,765	481,019	100.00%
Rejected Votes		893	929	660	772	932	929	1,045	922	227	7,309	
Total Polled		56,139	66,029	61,160	48,667	59,854	61,422	56,295	64,770	13,992	488,328	
Registered Electors		78,540	86,676	83,849	63,131	77,877	86,437	80,135	89,554		646,199	
Turnout		71.48%	76.18%	72.94%	77.09%	76.86%	71.06%	70.25%	72.33%		75.57%	

=== 1999 presidential election ===
Results of the 4th presidential election held on 21 December 1999:

Candidate	Party	Votes per Polling Division								Postal Votes	Total Votes	%
Candidate	Party	Agalawatta	Bandaragama	Beruwala	Bulathsinhala	Horana	Kalutara	Mathugama	Panadura	Postal Votes	Total Votes	%
Chandrika; Kumaratunga	PA	30,128	40,384	34,369	25,424	37,559	35,751	32,352	39,081	6,169	281,217	52.88%
Ranil; Wickramasinghe	UNP	26,506	28,430	29,585	22,879	27,700	27,131	25,813	24,976	4,403	217,423	40.88%
Nandana; Gunathilake	JVP	3,014	3,262	2,421	1,397	2,648	3,369	3,221	3,647	791	23,770	4.47%
Harischandra; Wijayatunga	SMBP	227	384	148	184	308	386	316	596	172	2,721	0.51%
W. V. M. Ranjith	Ind 2	208	171	160	156	182	127	183	90	2	1,279	0.24%
Tennyson; Edirisuriya	Ind 1	176	154	150	131	139	135	148	96	4	1,133	0.21%
Rajiva; Wijesinha	LPSL	163	139	114	128	126	111	162	81	4	1,028	0.19%
Vasudeva; Nanayakkara	LDA	78	154	81	45	130	131	75	242	67	1,003	0.19%
Abdul; Rasool	SLMP	86	78	159	69	77	105	74	144	4	796	0.15%
Kamal; Karunadasa	PLSF	76	90	70	69	79	77	83	60	4	608	0.11%
Hudson; Samarasinghe	Ind 3	83	37	35	63	40	38	71	19	0	386	0.07%
A. W. Premawardhana	PFF	34	40	15	28	31	31	32	16	2	229	0.04%
Ariyawansha; Dissanayaka	DUNF	34	31	14	24	21	21	35	25	11	216	0.04%
Valid Votes		60,813	73,354	67,321	50,597	69,040	67,413	62,565	69,073	11,633	531,809	100.00%
Rejected Votes		1,226	1,467	1,145	991	1,417	1,540	1,492	2,014	504	11,796	
Total Polled		62,039	74,821	68,466	51,588	70,457	68,953	64,057	71,087	12,137	543,605	
Registered Electors		82,145	93,107	87,513	66,212	86,680	90,723	84,575	91,768		682,723	
Turnout		75.52%	80.36%	78.24%	77.91%	81.28%	76.00%	75.74%	77.46%		79.62%	

=== 2005 presidential election ===
Results of the 5th presidential election held on 17 November 2005 for the district:

Candidate	Party	Votes per Polling Division								Postal Votes	Total Votes	%
Candidate	Party	Agalawatta	Bandaragama	Beruwala	Bulathsinhala	Horana	Kalutara	Mathugama	Panadura	Postal Votes	Total Votes	%
Mahinda; Rajapaksa	UPFA	37,518	50,481	37,402	29,218	44,801	45,143	40,006	46,097	11,027	341,693	55.48%
Ranil; Wickramasinghe	UNP	31,449	34,749	37,390	25,918	34,300	32,916	30,853	33,034	5,434	266,043	43.20%
Siritunga; Jayasuriya	USP	408	341	372	371	293	237	379	216	6	2,623	0.43%
A. A. Suraweera	NDF	254	279	224	251	232	222	271	182	6	1,921	0.31%
Victor; Hettigoda	ULPP	81	105	105	85	134	91	105	128	31	865	0.14%
Chamil; Jayaneththi	NLF	91	63	84	81	68	63	67	85	12	614	0.10%
Aruna de Soyza	RPP	57	52	66	46	56	76	65	46	4	468	0.08%
Anura; De Silva	ULF	56	72	55	36	53	43	58	47	4	424	0.07%
Wimal; Geeganage	SLNF	57	59	48	66	54	48	60	25	5	422	0.07%
A. K. J. Arachchige	DUA	52	40	47	40	48	36	53	22	1	339	0.06%
Wije; Dias	SEP	24	21	27	28	21	37	29	23	5	215	0.03%
P. Nelson; Perera	SLPF	26	23	21	30	15	13	23	14	0	165	0.03%
H. S. Dharmadwaja	UNAF	8	6	10	9	14	5	13	2	1	68	0.01%
Valid Votes		70,081	86,291	75,851	56,179	80,089	78,930	71,982	79,921	16,536	615,860	100.00%
Rejected Votes		656	870	885	644	802	808	756	762	334	6,517	
Total Polled		70,737	87,161	76,736	56,823	80,891	79,738	72,738	80,683	16,870	622,377	
Registered Electors		89,979	107,308	99,026	71,080	100,085	102,020	93,479	101,328		764,305	
Turnout		78.62%	81.23%	77.49%	79.94%	80.82%	78.16%	77.81%	79.63%		81.43%	

=== 2010 presidential election ===
Results of the 6th presidential election held on 26 January 2010 for the district:

Candidate	Party	Votes per Polling Division								Postal Votes	Total Votes	%
Candidate	Party	Agalawatta	Bandaragama	Beruwala	Bulathsinhala	Horana	Kalutara	Mathugama	Panadura	Postal Votes	Total Votes	%
Mahinda; Rajapaksa	UPFA	47,317	62,363	43,787	38,018	57,292	51,330	47,988	50,772	13,695	412,562	63.06%
Sarath; Fonseka	NDF	23,717	32,290	35,678	19,073	27,818	29,719	26,016	31,319	6,177	231,807	35.43%
A. A. Suraweera	NDF	286	203	172	190	209	218	275	122	8	1,683	0.26%
M. C. M. Ismail	DUNF	168	140	133	233	155	129	183	96	5	1,242	0.19%
C. J. Sugathsiri; Gamage	UDF	173	122	153	163	107	111	233	112	7	1,181	0.18%
W. V. M. Ranjith	Ind 1	195	156	124	103	130	133	124	100	10	1,075	0.16%
A. S. P. Liyanage	SLLP	107	107	80	119	89	76	108	77	2	765	0.12%
Ukkubanda; Wijekoon	Ind 3	72	79	78	77	85	63	77	50	1	582	0.09%
Siritunga; Jayasuriya	USP	83	57	44	69	65	43	73	34	4	472	0.07%
Sarath; Manamendra	NSH	76	52	60	62	71	43	53	33	3	453	0.07%
Lal; Perera	ONF	49	68	54	49	62	40	56	42	1	421	0.06%
Aithurus; M. Illias	Ind 2	57	67	49	47	51	34	44	26	4	379	0.06%
Vikramabahu; Karunaratne	LF	41	27	27	39	44	30	42	49	6	305	0.05%
M. K. Shivajilingam	Ind 5	36	33	12	40	39	24	47	15	2	248	0.04%
Wije; Dias	SEP	23	29	22	41	27	25	34	19	4	224	0.03%
Sanath; Pinnaduwa	NA	22	18	23	26	21	15	21	11	2	159	0.02%
M. Mohamed; Musthaffa	Ind 4	18	13	16	24	22	17	21	22	1	154	0.02%
Ven.Battaramulla; Seelarathana Thero	JP	25	22	10	23	13	7	29	10	4	143	0.02%
Senaratna de Silva	PNF	18	8	10	22	27	8	22	5	0	120	0.02%
Aruna de Soyza	RPP	14	15	12	21	18	7	17	16	0	120	0.02%
M. B. Thaminimulla	ACAKO	12	13	7	10	13	12	4	6	1	78	0.01%
Sarath; Kongahage	UNAF	14	10	7	7	8	1	15	11	3	76	0.01%
Valid Votes		72,523	95,892	80,558	58,456	86,366	82,085	75,482	82,947	19,940	654,249	100.00%
Rejected Votes		486	558	523	423	666	581	564	553	187	4,541	
Total Polled		73,009	96,450	81,081	58,879	87,032	82,666	76,046	83,500	20,127	658,790	
Registered Electors		93,972	118,942	104,363	74,991	108,781	106,878	99,737	105,569		813,233	
Turnout		77.69%	81.09%	77.69%	78.51%	80.01%	77.35%	76.25%	79.10%		81.01%	

=== 2015 presidential election ===
Results of the 7th presidential election held on 8 January 2015:

Candidate	Party	Votes per Polling Division								Postal Votes	Total Votes	%
Candidate	Party	Agalawatta	Bandaragama	Beruwala	Bulathsinhala	Horana	Kalutara	Mathugama	Panadura	Postal Votes	Total Votes	%
Mahinda; Rajapaksa	UPFA	44,750	61,199	37,424	37,311	57,633	48,851	45,984	45,908	14,830	395,890	52.65%
Maithripala; Sirisena	NDF	33,950	48,469	53,280	28,341	42,065	44,804	38,668	46,820	12,962	349,404	46.46%
R. A. Sirisena	PNF	154	154	96	123	120	92	148	84	8	979	0.13%
Namal; Rajapaksa	ONF	142	118	88	95	107	82	114	57	5	808	0.11%
Duminda; Nagamuwa	FSP	79	89	93	74	76	92	96	71	25	695	0.09%
A. S. P. Liyanage	SLLP	67	68	113	79	62	60	94	54	8	605	0.08%
R. Peduru; Arachchi	ULPP	87	75	75	78	52	58	94	37	4	560	0.07%
M. I. Mohanmed; Mishlar	UPF	79	73	79	42	71	55	76	79	5	559	0.07%
Aithurus; M. Illias	Ind 1	67	97	73	64	77	48	59	59	6	547	0.07%
Siritunga; Jayasuriya	USP	55	73	37	49	64	43	57	31	7	416	0.06%
Sarath; Manamendra	NSH	53	45	38	39	48	27	49	33	0	336	0.04%
Pani; Wijesiriwardene	SEP	19	31	27	29	22	25	30	20	7	210	0.03%
Ven.Battaramulla; Seelarathana Thero	JSP	21	36	20	11	25	24	20	34	15	206	0.03%
M. B. Theminimulla	ACAKO	25	24	28	19	19	20	20	20	3	178	0.02%
Anurudha; Polgampola	Ind 2	18	22	23	24	22	23	27	10	2	171	0.02%
Sundaram; Mahendran	NSSP	18	21	15	17	13	6	26	14	0	130	0.02%
Prasanna; Priyankara	DNM	20	15	13	17	11	12	15	7	6	121	0.02%
Jayantha; Kulathunga	ULGC	14	10	14	8	13	12	12	12	3	93	0.01%
Wimal; Geeganage	SLNF	11	12	4	11	17	8	8	5	4	80	0.01%
Valid Votes		79,764	110,628	93,540	66,431	100,517	94,342	85,597	93,355	27,900	751,984	100.00%
Rejected Votes		1,002	999	951	716	952	905	1,063	1,152	641	8,381	1.1%
Total Polled		80,676	111,627	94,491	67,147	101,469	95,247	86,660	94,507	28,541	760,365	84.73%
Registered Electors		100,040	133,887	117,033	82,123	122,511	117,931	108,996	114,828	28,997	897,349	

=== 2019 presidential election ===
Results of the 8th presidential election held on 16 November 2019:

Candidate	Party	Votes per Polling Division								Postal Votes	Total Votes	%
Candidate	Party	Agalawatta	Bandaragama	Beruwala	Bulathsinhala	Horana	Kalutara	Mathugama	Panadura	Postal Votes	Total Votes	%
Gotabaya; Rajapaksa	SLPP	52,400	74,879	48,037	42,021	69,822	59,796	55,932	57,447	22,586	482,920	59.49%
Sajith; Premadasa	NDF	28,744	38,981	47,654	25,407	32,967	34,076	31,451	35,761	9,172	284,213	35.01%
Anura Kumara; Dissanayake	NMPP	2,319	4,312	3,172	1,468	3,532	4,034	3,028	3,904	1,912	27,681	3.41%
Mahesh; Senanayake	NPP	203	432	252	169	412	542	257	649	297	3,213	0.40%
Ajantha; Perera	SPSL	243	295	228	187	299	241	226	161	22	1,902	0.23%
Rohan; Pallewatte	JSWP	182	206	127	169	239	157	199	184	48	1,511	0.19%
M. L. A. M. Hizbullah	Ind 11	185	193	266	151	146	179	164	137	19	1,440	0.18%
Ariyawansa; Dissanayake	DUNF	149	124	142	93	120	98	139	85	6	956	0.12%
Siripala; Amarasinghe	Ind 02	111	82	78	110	105	53	111	59	12	740	0.09%
Duminda; Nagamuwa	FSP	67	108	97	74	75	109	93	89	27	739	0.09%
Ajantha de zoysa	RJP	106	74	97	78	81	71	84	55	10	637	0.08%
Namal; Rajapaksa	NUA	53	77	60	68	93	75	96	58	10	590	0.07%
Milroy; Fernando	Ind 09	83	87	91	67	61	59	85	50	4	587	0.07%
Ven.Battaramulla; Seelarathana Thero	JSP	55	90	86	59	64	55	81	54	12	566	0.07%
Jayantha; Ketagoda	Ind 07	62	59	58	42	64	40	82	34	4	445	0.05%
Anuruddha; Polgampola	Ind 08	35	44	62	50	52	30	70	30	8	381	0.05%
Ven.Aparekke; Punnananda Thero	Ind 01	41	52	49	44	47	39	46	33	16	367	0.05%
Subramanium; Gunaratnam	ONF	40	35	54	50	44	34	75	25	4	361	0.04%
A. S. P. Liyanage	SLLP	45	32	48	34	30	27	39	17	1	273	0.03%
Piyasiri; Wijenayake	Ind 13	24	36	42	25	36	30	38	18	4	253	0.03%
Aruna de soyza	DNM	33	30	24	29	35	18	25	20	4	218	0.03%
Aithurus; M. Illias	Ind 03	30	32	33	21	33	24	22	16	2	213	0.03%
Vajirapani; Wijesiriwardene	SEP	19	24	23	25	28	29	21	17	7	193	0.02%
Sirithunga; Jayasuriya	USP	24	22	15	26	19	18	31	16	9	180	0.02%
Sarath; Manamendra	NSU	22	20	23	20	23	21	29	13	1	172	0.02%
Rajiva; Wijesinha	Ind 14	17	4	21	20	26	21	20	14	2	145	0.02%
A. H. M. Alavi	Ind 04	15	20	16	21	21	11	24	14	0	142	0.02%
Ashoka; Wadigamangawa	Ind 12	18	15	13	18	21	18	21	10	2	136	0.02%
M. K. Shivajilingam	Ind 10	14	12	14	13	14	15	17	11	4	114	0.01%
Priyantha; Edirisinghe	ACAKO	7	7	16	12	17	12	14	15	4	104	0.01%
Saman; Perera	OPPP	10	14	22	13	16	7	7	7	8	104	0.01%
Sarath; Keerthirathna	Ind 05	12	15	15	8	11	9	9	9	2	90	0.01%
B. G. Nandimithra	NSSP	8	7	9	10	13	6	15	5	2	75	0.01%
Samaraweera; Weeravanni	Ind 15	7	10	6	12	14	8	8	8	0	73	0.01%
Samansiri; Herath	Ind 06	8	7	4	3	3	3	7	3	1	39	0.00%
Valid Votes		85,391	120,437	100,954	70,617	108,583	99,965	92,566	99,028	34,222	811,763	100.00%
Rejected Votes		492	944	885	503	883	870	786	827	657	6,847	0.72%
Total Polled		85,883	121,381	101,839	71,120	109,466	100,835	93,352	99,855	34,879	818,610	85.71%
Registered Electors		99,484	140,999	121,486	82,439	128,005	119,526	109,804	118,719	35,218	955,079	

=== 2024 presidential election ===
Results of the 9th presidential election held on 21 September 2024:

Candidate	Party	Votes per Polling Division								Postal Votes	Votes	%
Candidate	Party	Agalawatta	Bandaragama	Beruwala	Bulathsinhala	Horana	Kalutara	Mathugama	Panadura	Postal Votes	Votes	%
Anura Kumara; Dissanayake	NPP	34,139	60,752	44,146	28,052	54,322	52,607	43,598	48,586	21,589	387,764	47.73%
Sajith; Premadasa	SJB	29,833	33,363	39,007	23,773	27,090	25,006	27,738	25,032	5,465	236,307	28.91%
Ranil; Wickremesinghe	Ind16	13,518	21,996	14,583	11,903	23,064	17,078	16,046	17,641	7,456	143,285	17.53%
Namal; Rajapaksa	SLPP	3,117	3,573	2,414	2,693	3,024	1,997	2,580	2,666	663	22,727	2.7%
Dilith; Jayaweera	SLCP	896	1,876	510	729	1,786	1,293	890	1,891	390	10,261	1.26%
K. K. Piyadasa	Ind04	252	193	312	210	188	151	288	118	18	1,730	0.21%
D. M. Bandaranayake	Ind13	194	254	179	150	177	176	201	161	29	1,521	0.19%
Sarath; Fonseka	Ind12	158	160	161	149	187	136	168	145	53	1,317	0.16%
Nuwan; Bopege	SPF	114	145	118	90	80	198	118	104	43	1,013	0.12%
Sarath; Keerthirathne	Ind05	117	133	132	124	135	108	135	69	7	960	0.12%
Wijeyadasa; Rajapakshe	JPF	109	125	123	102	142	83	126	91	37	938	0.11%
Suranjeewa; Anoj de Silva	DUNF	81	188	77	76	170	115	84	104	30	925	0.11%
Namal; Rajapaksa	SBP	113	123	80	96	106	58	105	78	30	789	0.1%
Anuruddha; Polgampola	Ind11	97	114	105	98	102	75	87	89	6	773	0.09%
Ven.Akmeemana; Dayarathana Thero	Ind01	91	84	60	78	92	85	83	61	18	652	0.08%
K. R. Krishan	APP	124	73	68	80	83	47	103	31	2	611	0.07%
Ajantha de Zoyza	RJA	72	99	73	56	74	67	80	51	10	582	0.07%
Priyantha; Wickremesinghe	NSSP	67	91	58	50	89	62	85	46	13	561	0.07%
Siripala; Amarasinghe	Ind02	67	61	64	59	49	46	65	43	5	459	0.06%
Ven.Battaramulle; Seelarathana Thero	JSP	51	79	28	40	68	56	37	63	12	434	0.05%
Victor; Anthony Perera	Ind10	79	42	47	60	50	29	61	24	3	395	0.05%
Sirithunga; Jayasuriya	USP	57	46	48	59	44	28	45	47	3	377	0.05%
Premasiri; Manage	Ind14	56	39	40	59	31	23	41	28	1	318	0.04%
Abubakar Mohamed; Infaz	DUA	35	34	52	46	37	20	38	32	5	299	0.04%
Mahinda; Dewage	SLSP	35	42	27	23	33	37	33	21	7	258	0.03%
Roshan; Ranasinghe	Ind15	20	32	23	16	32	26	26	60	14	249	0.03%
Keerthi; Wickremeratne	AJP	24	40	23	26	40	16	35	30	7	241	0.03%
Oshala; Herath	NIF	21	32	26	24	37	36	26	22	6	230	0.03%
P. W. S. K. Bandaranayake	NDF	28	38	34	30	26	21	29	16	1	223	0.03%
Vajirapani; Wijesiriwardene	SEP	28	39	18	41	20	12	30	24	5	217	0.03%
Ananda; Kularatne	Ind06	27	26	41	18	32	21	28	22	1	216	0.03%
Pakkiyaselvam; Ariyanethiran	Ind09	24	26	28	26	30	19	43	15	4	215	0.03%
Lalith; De Silva	UNFP	16	19	26	29	17	19	18	25	7	176	0.03%
Sidney; Jayarathna	Ind07	25	25	18	15	19	20	16	14	2	154	0.02%
Janaka; Ratnayake	ULPP	18	15	15	19	17	6	13	11	10	124	0.02%
Sarath; Manamendra	NSU	8	16	13	6	10	11	6	8	2	80	0.01%
A. S. P. Liyanage	SLLP	7	15	13	10	8	5	8	7	2	75	0.01%
Mylvanagam; Thilakarajah	Ind08	10	9	14	7	5	5	7	2	3	62	0.01%
Valid Votes		83,518	124,017	102,804	69,098	111,516	99,798	93,120	94,478	35,979	817,518	100.00%
Rejected Votes		1,448	2,403	1,751	1,734	2,437	1,859	1,792	2,056	763	16,243	1.95%
Total Polled		85,176	126,420	104,555	70,832	113,953	101,657	94,912	99,534	36,722	833,761	81.4%
Registered Electors		104,424	154,272	130,456	86,639	140,590	127,561	117,866	125,088	37,348	1,024,244	

Preferential votes

6,135	8,517
Anura Kumara Dissanayake	Sajith Premadasa

== Parliamentary general election ==
=== 1989 parliamentary general election ===
Results of the 9th parliamentary election held on 15 February 1989 for the district:

Party	Votes per Polling Division								Postal Votes	Total Votes	%	Seats
Party	Agalawatta	Bandaragama	Beruwala	Bulathsinhala	Horana	Kalutara	Mathugama	Panadura	Postal Votes	Total Votes	%	Seats
United National Party (Note: Including the Ceylon Workers' Congress.)	16,311	24,894	19,298	16,360	25,770	17,840	13,643	20,473	5,480	160,069	49.84%	6
Sri Lanka Freedom Party	11,397	23,202	12,976	12,024	17,658	14,374	12,156	23,778	3,945	131,510	40.94%	5
Sri Lanka Muslim Congress	158	1,968	5,250	321	129	2,248	436	2,428	33	12,971	4.04%	0
United Socialist Alliance (Note: Including the CPSL, LSSP, NSSP, SLMP.)	679	1,764	642	207	1,778	3,311	414	3,025	522	12,342	3.84%	0
Mahajana Eksath Peramuna	101	369	112	253	839	122	108	641	145	2,690	0.84%	0
United Lanka People's Party	175	167	224	156	103	247	312	165	62	1,611	0.50%	0
Valid Votes	28,821	52,364	38,502	29,321	46,277	38,142	27,069	50,510	10,187	321,193	100.00%	11
Rejected Votes	2,545	2,550	2,214	2,463	2,883	2,407	2,621	2,162	294	20,139		
Total Polled	31,366	54,914	40,716	31,784	49,160	40,549	29,690	52,672	10,481	341,332		
Registered Electors	69,937	72,270	72,355	57,111	67,915	73,971	68,955	76,836	10,843	570,193		
Turnout	44.85%	75.98%	56.27%	55.65%	72.38%	54.82%	43.06%	68.55%	96.66%	59.86%		

Preferential votes
Alliance	Party	Candidate	votes
SLFP	SLFP	Thilak Karunaratne	54,339
UNP	UNP	Indradasa Hettiarachchi	54,099
SLFP	SLFP	Sumitha Priyanganie Abeyweera	51,494
SLFP	SLFP	Neville Fernando	40,977
SLFP	SLFP	Anil Moonesinghe	40,320
UNP	UNP	Punsiri Samaranayake	36,150
UNP	UNP	Imthiaz Bakeer Markar	35,433
UNP	UNP	P. D. Abeyratne	30,292
SLFP	SLFP	Mangala Moonesinghe	28,522
UNP	UNP	Mervin Joseph Cooray	27,130
UNP	UNP	Sarath Ranawaka	20,983

=== 1994 parliamentary general election ===
Results of the 10th parliamentary election held on 16 August 1994 for the district:

Party	Votes per Polling Division								Postal Votes	Total Votes	%	Seats
Party	Agalawatta	Bandaragama	Beruwala	Bulathsinhala	Horana	Kalutara	Mathugama	Panadura	Postal Votes	Total Votes	%	Seats
People's Alliance (Note: Including the SLFP et al..)	31,009	37,374	33,686	24,364	32,374	34,349	30,514	39,309	8,775	271,754	53.77%	6
United National Party (Note: Including the Ceylon Workers' Congress.)	27,007	28,531	29,063	23,755	27,562	27,482	26,520	25,692	5,503	221,115	43.75%	4
Sri Lanka Progressive Front (Note: Including the JVP.)	693	774	809	226	515	1,107	969	970	175	6,238	1.23%	0
Mahajana Eksath Peramuna	402	707	776	305	771	727	670	1,163	393	5,914	1.17%	0
People's Freedom Front	54	31	42	35	50	27	54	41	5	339	0.07%	0
Valid Votes	59,165	67,417	64,376	48,685	61,272	63,692	58,727	67,175	14,851	505,360	100.00%	10
Rejected Votes	3,818	3,059	2,805	3,121	2,656	3,029	4,034	2,642	233	25,397		
Total Polled	62,983	70,476	67,181	51,806	63,928	66,721	62,761	69,817	15,084	530,757		
Registered Electors	78,540	86,676	83,849	63,131	77,877	86,437	80,135	89,554		646,199		
Turnout	80.19%	81.31%	80.12%	82.06%	82.09%	77.19%	78.32%	77.96%		82.14%		

Preferential votes
Alliance	Party	Candidate	votes
PA	SLFP	Ratnasiri Wickremanayake	88,213
PA	SLFP	Sumitha Priyanganie Abeyweera	85,661
PA	SLFP	Reginald Cooray	85,297
PA	SLFP	Kumara Welgama	79,056
PA	SLFP	Ediriweera Premarathna	70,041
UNP	UNP	Imthiaz Bakeer Markar	68,519
UNP	UNP	Thilak Karunarathna	63,206
UNP	UNP	Sarath Ranawaka	60,506
UNP	UNP	Mahinda Samarasinghe	59,150
PA	SLFP	Anil Moonesinghe	56,071

=== 2000 parliamentary general election ===
Results of the 11th parliamentary election held on 10 October 2000 for the district:

Party	Votes per Polling Division								Postal Votes	Total Votes	%	Seats
Party	Agalawatta	Bandaragama	Beruwala	Bulathsinhala	Horana	Kalutara	Mathugama	Panadura	Postal Votes	Total Votes	%	Seats
People's Alliance (Note: Including the SLFP et al..)	28,531	35,860	30,179	24,308	36,659	31,469	29,968	30,848	7,353	255,175	46.86%	5
United National Party	27,665	27,434	29,392	22,812	27,259	26,641	25,518	25,994	4,500	217,215	39.89%	4
Janatha Vimukthi Peramuna	4,128	5,534	3,988	2,037	4,191	5,516	4,709	7,047	1,223	38,373	7.05%	1
Sinhala Heritage	835	2,760	1,565	597	1,233	2,428	1,648	4,035	518	15,619	2.87%	0
National Unity Alliance (Note: Including the SLMC et al..)	153	1,688	3,671	471	82	2,464	519	2,857	38	11,943	2.19%	0
New Left Front (Note: Including the NSSP et al..)	492	323	299	265	452	289	426	363	25	2,934	0.54%	0
Citizen's; Front	67	48	185	52	76	47	80	75	12	642	0.12%	0
Sinhalaye Mahasammatha Bhoomiputra Pakshaya	92	81	33	52	80	80	52	146	21	637	0.12%	0
Independent Group 4	70	55	64	38	48	32	56	37	0	400	0.07%	0
Democratic United National Front	41	32	31	41	37	30	40	40	0	292	0.05%	0
Left & Democratic Alliance	9	14	18	17	17	52	75	41	12	255	0.05%	0
Independent Group 5	33	22	18	17	17	26	39	21	3	196	0.04%	0
Independent Group 1	25	15	21	18	20	22	28	22	0	171	0.03%	0
Sri Lanka Muslim Party	20	22	21	5	12	26	37	21	4	168	0.03%	0
Independent Group 3	28	17	8	15	15	17	15	8	0	123	0.02%	0
Independent Group 2	13	21	11	16	13	8	16	20	0	118	0.02%	0
National Development Front	15	30	6	10	14	7	11	18	2	113	0.02%	0
Sri Lanka Progressive Front	8	16	12	3	9	3	5	9	0	65	0.01%	0
People's Freedom Front	4	6	6	6	3	6	6	4	0	41	0.01%	0
Ruhuna People's Party	3	3	5	2	5	6	7	7	0	38	0.01%	0
Valid Votes	62,232	73,981	69,533	50,782	70,242	69,169	63,255	71,613	13,711	544,518	100.00%	10
Rejected Votes	3,534	3,159	2,885	3,046	2,928	3,385	3,672	2,792	330	25,731		
Total Polled	65,766	77,140	72,418	53,828	73,170	72,554	66,927	74,405	14,041	570,249		
Registered Electors	83,947	95,223	89,742	67,198	88,937	92,550	85,838	94,221		697,656		
Turnout	78.34%	81.01%	80.70%	80.10%	82.27%	78.39%	77.97%	78.97%		81.74%		

The following candidates were elected:

Preferential votes
Alliance	Party	Candidate	votes
PA	SLFP	Ratnasiri Wickremanayake	148,705
UNP	UNP	Mahinda Samarasinghe	82,511
UNP	UNP	Imthiaz Bakeer Markar	74,555
UNP	UNP	Rajitha Senaratne	73,382
PA	SLFP	Reginald Cooray	67,945
PA	SLFP	Tudor Dayaratne	63,636
PA	SLFP	Kumara Welgama	60,394
PA	SLFP	Ediriweera Premarathna	53,690
UNP	UNP	P. D. Aberatne	47,271
JVP	JVP	Nandana Gunathilake	5,628

=== 2001 parliamentary general election ===
Results of the 12th parliamentary election held on 5 December 2001 for the district:

Party	Votes per Polling Division								Postal Votes	Total Votes	%	Seats
Party	Agalawatta	Bandaragama	Beruwala	Bulathsinhala	Horana	Kalutara	Mathugama	Panadura	Postal Votes	Total Votes	%	Seats
United National Front (Note: Including the UNP, SLMC, CWC, WPF.)	29,734	33,272	36,709	24,592	31,462	32,344	29,290	32,013	4,923	254,339	45.94%	5
People's Alliance (Note: Including the SLFP et al.)	25,147	32,966	25,641	20,909	31,788	28,693	25,761	29,288	6,275	226,468	40.91%	4
Janatha Vimukthi Peramuna	6,599	8,544	6,581	3,976	7,013	8,768	7,697	9,435	1,835	60,451	10.92%	1
Sinhala Heritage	297	845	455	215	476	736	552	1,367	160	5,103	0.92%	0
New Left Front (Note: Including the NSSP et al.)	318	326	321	201	346	263	283	290	21	2,369	0.43%	0
United Socialist Party	292	255	358	242	215	291	271	230	8	2,162	0.39%	0
Muslim United Liberation Front	216	220	260	200	201	186	212	189	9	1,693	0.31%	0
Sinhalaye Mahasammatha Bhoomiputra Pakshaya	23	43	6	7	28	26	12	54	5	204	0.04%	0
Independent Group 7	29	15	14	37	26	24	16	16	1	178	0.03%	0
National Development Front	16	20	17	13	12	15	22	12	2	129	0.02%	0
Independent Group 5	22	3	14	8	12	11	18	10	1	99	0.02%	0
Independent Group 6	10	14	9	15	16	6	12	13	0	95	0.02%	0
Independent Group 2	9	8	11	4	10	14	6	6	2	70	0.01%	0
Independent Group 4	11	6	8	3	12	7	7	2	3	59	0.01%	0
Ruhuna People's Party	3	5	9	6	8	5	6	9	4	55	0.01%	0
Sri Lanka National Front	5	8	4	7	5	6	6	11	1	53	0.01%	0
Independent Group 1	9	1	4	6	3	4	11	11	0	49	0.01%	0
Independent Group 3	6	4	9	5	5	6	4	4	0	43	0.01%	0
Valid Votes	62,746	76,555	70,430	50,446	71,638	71,405	64,186	72,960	13,253	553,619	100.00%	10
Rejected Votes	4,963	3,912	3,903	3,730	3,779	3,911	4,472	3,655	292	32,617		
Total Polled	67,709	80,467	74,333	54,176	75,417	75,316	68,658	76,615	13,545	586,236		
Registered Electors	86,105	98,871	92,658	67,795	91,968	95,698	88,182	96,487		717,764		
Turnout	78.64%	81.39%	80.22%	79.91%	82.00%	78.70%	77.86%	79.40%		81.68%		

The following candidates were elected:

Preferential votes
Alliance	Party	Candidate	votes
PA	SLFP	Ratnasiri Wickremanayake	120,432
UNF	UNP	Mahinda Samarasinghe	108,583
UNF	UNP	Rajitha Senaratne	102,919
UNF	UNP	Imthiaz Bakeer Markar	89,147
PA	SLFP	Kumara Welgama	81,507
PA	SLFP	Tudor Dayaratne	55,181
UNF	UNP	P. D. Abeyratne	52,414
PA	SLFP	Rohitha Abeygunawardena	46,571
UNF	UNP	Ananda Lakshman Wijemanne	45,766
JVP	JVP	Nandana Gunathilake	8,312

=== 2004 parliamentary general election ===
Results of the 13th parliamentary election held on 2 April 2004 for the district:

Party	Votes per Polling Division								Postal Votes	Total Votes	%	Seats
Party	Agalawatta	Bandaragama	Beruwala	Bulathsinhala	Horana	Kalutara	Mathugama	Panadura	Postal Votes	Total Votes	%	Seats
United People's Freedom Alliance (Note: Including the SLFP, JVP.)	33,939	41,850	33,583	25,374	38,421	37,958	36,294	35,687	8,102	291,208	51.72%	6
United National Front (Note: Including the UNP, SLMC, CWC, WPF.)	26,456	27,240	30,210	22,767	26,764	26,255	24,912	24,020	4,097	212,721	37.78%	3
Jathika Hela Urumaya	2,538	8,989	6,751	2,621	7,166	8,324	4,542	14,274	1,410	56,615	10.06%	1
New Left Front (Note: Including the NSSP et al.)	39	87	37	34	84	118	35	113	13	560	0.10%	0
United Socialist Party	61	52	75	37	41	47	40	79	0	432	0.08%	0
United Muslim People's Party	56	47	94	40	46	44	58	35	0	420	0.07%	0
Independent Group 9	35	26	24	26	23	24	34	19	1	212	0.04%	0
United Lalith Front	23	18	21	17	26	19	24	11	2	161	0.03%	0
Independent Group 8	21	14	27	11	13	15	22	16	1	140	0.02%	0
Swarajya; Party	16	18	4	13	28	6	6	8	1	100	0.02%	0
Sinhalaye Mahasammatha Bhoomiputra Pakshaya	9	10	12	5	12	7	9	12	3	79	0.01%	0
Independent Group 1	10	3	7	6	4	7	14	4	1	56	0.01%	0
Independent Group 7	7	6	2	4	7	4	4	5	4	43	0.01%	0
Independent Group 6	4	8	5	5	3	3	6	6	1	41	0.01%	0
Independent Group 2	2	5	7	6	6	3	5	1	0	35	0.01%	0
Democratic United National Front	5	9	2	6	0	2	6	2	2	34	0.01%	0
Ruhuna People's Party	6	8	3	1	4	3	3	4	0	32	0.01%	0
Sri Lanka National Front	5	5	7	3	2	1	6	2	0	31	0.01%	0
Independent Group 4	4	4	4	5	2	5	1	3	1	29	0.01%	0
Sri Lanka Progressive Front	3	1	2	5	5	4	3	4	0	27	0.00%	0
Independent Group 5	5	3	4	0	4	2	3	3	0	24	0.00%	0
Independent Group 3	2	2	2	1	5	3	3	1	0	19	0.00%	0
Valid Votes	63,246	78,405	70,883	50,987	72,666	72,854	66,030	74,309	13,639	563,019	100.00%	10
Rejected Votes	4,665	3,826	3,912	3,728	3,407	3,766	4,000	3,240	197	30,741		
Total Polled	67,911	82,231	74,795	54,715	76,073	76,620	70,030	77,549	13,836	593,760		
Registered Electors	88,142	104,093	96,897	69,720	96,686	99,940	90,919	99,741		746,138		
Turnout	77.05%	79.00%	77.19%	78.48%	78.68%	76.67%	77.02%	77.75%		79.58%		

Preferential votes
Alliance	Party	Candidate	votes
UPFA	JVP	Nandana Gunathilake	135,743
UNF	UNP	Rajitha Senaratne	97,001
UPFA	JVP	Jayantha Samaraweera	95,461
UNF	UNP	Mahinda Samarasinghe	93,758
UPFA	SLFP	Reginald Cooray (Note: Reginald Cooray (UPFA-SLFP) resigned on 28 May 2004 to contest the Western provincial council elections. His replacement Nirmala Kotalawala was sworn in on 20 July 2004.)	78,693
UPFA	JVP	Piyasiri Wijenayake	75,982
UPFA	SLFP	Kumara Welgama	73,350
UPFA	SLFP	Rohitha Abeygunawardena	62,598
UNF	UNP	Sarath Ranawaka (Note: Sarath Ranawaka (UNF-UNP) died on 25 July 2009. His replacement Ananda Lakshman Wijemanna (UNF-UNP) was sworn in on 6 August 2009.)	48,380
JHU	JHU	Ven.Athuraliye Rathana Thero	10,772

=== 2010 parliamentary general election ===
Results of the 14th parliamentary election held on 8 April 2010 for the district:

Party	Votes per Polling Division								Postal Votes	Total Votes	%	Seats
Party	Agalawatta	Bandaragama	Beruwala	Bulathsinhala	Horana	Kalutara	Mathugama	Panadura	Postal Votes	Total Votes	%	Seats
United People's Freedom Alliance (Note: Including the SLFP.)	35,541	44,927	32,709	29,522	44,136	38,300	35,920	37,818	14,963	313,836	63.68%	7
United National Front (Note: Including the UNP, SLMC, DPF, SLFP(P).)	14,402	19,017	21,737	11,737	16,613	16,838	17,295	18,022	3,935	139,596	28.32%	2
Democratic National Alliance (Note: Including the JVP, DNF et al.)	1,909	5,803	5,716	1,577	4,020	5,584	2,990	7,340	1,783	36,722	7.45%	1
Our National Front	31	53	34	32	48	36	37	32	7	310	0.06%	0
Independent Group 22	30	28	34	29	27	26	37	19	2	232	0.05%	0
Independent Group 19	15	30	25	19	28	28	26	39	3	213	0.04%	0
National Development Front	28	24	12	26	16	23	29	12	3	173	0.04%	0
Sri Lanka National Front	1	16	0	0	123	3	5	21	3	172	0.03%	0
Independent Group 9	5	45	4	21	53	9	8	2	1	148	0.03%	0
United National Alternative Front	17	11	23	15	11	20	26	11	1	135	0.03%	0
Left Liberation Front	8	16	13	4	26	14	10	34	2	127	0.03%	0
Independent Group 5	14	20	15	11	8	20	14	10	0	112	0.02%	0
Independent Group 20	17	26	4	10	17	9	12	7	0	102	0.02%	0
Independent Group 3	8	11	14	8	28	13	7	4	2	95	0.02%	0
United Democratic Front	11	12	15	5	12	10	12	10	2	89	0.02%	0
Independent Group 4	6	16	13	14	9	12	10	7	1	88	0.02%	0
Independent Group 21	9	8	11	9	12	4	10	6	1	70	0.01%	0
Patriotic National Front	9	6	5	3	6	8	7	9	0	53	0.01%	0
Independent Group 13	0	4	2	6	30	1	2	7	0	52	0.01%	0
Independent Group 7	11	3	4	2	4	7	13	3	0	47	0.01%	0
Janasetha Peramuna	3	6	19	3	7	1	5	2	1	47	0.01%	0
Independent Group 15	4	3	11	2	5	5	4	11	0	45	0.01%	0
All Are Citizens, All Are Kings Organisation	5	9	5	2	3	10	3	6	1	44	0.01%	0
Independent Group 10	13	4	3	4	1	5	7	2	0	39	0.01%	0
United Lanka Great Council	2	5	6	6	2	2	7	2	1	33	0.01%	0
Independent Group 8	2	11	1	2	4	0	12	0	0	32	0.01%	0
Independent Group 12	5	1	6	1	2	0	5	11	0	31	0.01%	0
Independent Group 6	6	3	2	5	3	4	5	2	1	31	0.01%	0
Independent Group 14	3	2	6	1	4	6	2	4	2	30	0.01%	0
Independent Group 11	6	1	6	1	6	4	1	3	1	29	0.01%	0
Independent Group 1	5	3	1	1	6	1	2	2	1	22	0.00%	0
Sinhalaye Mahasammatha Bhoomiputra Pakshaya	2	5	2	1	0	2	2	5	3	22	0.00%	0
Sri Lanka Labour Party	6	1	1	1	4	2	1	2	2	20	0.00%	0
Independent Group 2	3	2	4	3	0	3	2	2	0	19	0.00%	0
Independent Group 16	3	2	0	3	1	2	1	1	1	14	0.00%	0
Independent Group 18	2	1	0	3	2	0	4	1	0	13	0.00%	0
Independent Group 17	1	1	1	4	2	2	1	0	0	12	0.00%	0
Valid Votes	52,143	70,136	60,464	43,093	65,279	61,014	56,534	63,469	20,723	492,855	100.00%	10
Rejected Votes	6,851	7,122	6,644	5,734	6,100	6,056	6,566	5,851	827	51,751		
Total Polled	58,994	77,258	67,108	48,827	71,379	67,070	63,100	69,320	21,550	544,606		
Registered Electors	93,972	118,942	104,363	74,991	108,781	106,878	99,737	105,569		813,233		
Turnout	62.78%	64.95%	64.30%	65.11%	65.62%	62.75%	63.27%	65.66%		66.97%		

The following candidates were elected:

Preferential votes
Alliance	Party	Candidate	votes
UPFA	SLFP	Kumara Welgama	124,766
UPFA	SLFP	Mahinda Samarasinghe	97,778
UPFA	SLFP	Nirmala Kotalawala	82,044
UPFA	SLFP	Rohitha Abeygunawardena	77,205
UPFA	UNP	Rajitha Senaratne	66,710
UPFA	SLFP	Reginald Cooray	60,196
UNF	UNP	Palitha Thewarapperuma	51,153
UPFA	SLFP	Vidura Wickremenayake	50,114
UNF	UNP	Ajith Perera	48,588
DNA	DNA	Arjuna Ranatunga	27,796

=== 2015 parliamentary general election ===
Results of the 15th parliamentary election held on 17 August 2015:

Party	Votes per Polling Division								Postal Votes	Total Votes	%	Seats
Party	Agalawatta	Bandaragama	Beruwala	Bulathsinhala	Horana	Kalutara	Mathugama	Panadura	Postal Votes	Total Votes	%	Seats
United People's Freedom Alliance (Note: The alliance consisted of CWC, CF, DNF, DPC, LBSL, MEP, NC, NFF, PHU, SA (CPSL, DLF, LSSP, NLPP and SLPP), SLFP, TMVP and UCF.)	38,125	53,314	33,142	31,612	50,024	40,837	38,114	40,809	12,824	338,801	48.56%	5
United National Front for Good Governance (Note: The alliance consisted of ACMC, DNM, JHU, MTNA, NFGG, SLMC, TPA (DPF, NUW and UCPF), ULF and UNP.)	37,731	42,069	47,987	26,254	36,325	39,525	35,267	39,190	11,866	310,234	44.47%	4
Janatha Vimukthi Peramuna	2,860	6,180	3,670	2,052	5,037	5,775	4,087	6,253	2,561	38,475	5.52%	1
Bodu Jana Peramuna	388	455	2,119	219	290	652	953	520	131	5,727	0.82%	0
Democratic Party	109	340	102	121	166	217	159	477	105	4,706	0.26%	0
Frontline Socialist Party	81	130	85	55	72	110	78	101	38	750	0.11%	0
Our National Front	44	61	40	35	51	44	35	35	4	349	0.05%	0
United Socialist Party	31	27	52	35	33	30	73	37	6	324	0.05%	0
United People's Party	29	32	26	32	52	33	35	33	10	282	0.04%	0
Independent Group 05	35	23	36	28	26	24	44	23	0	239	0.03%	0
Independent Group 04	21	13	12	10	8	10	14	10	0	98	0.01%	0
All Citizens are All Kings Organization	6	10	8	15	26	10	10	9	2	96	0.01%	0
Independent Group 01	7	18	7	3	37	8	5	3	4	92	0.01%	0
Nava Sama Samaja Party	25	4	7	6	11	2	19	10	1	85	0.01%	0
Janasetha Peramuna	6	12	10	5	9	7	7	11	3	70	0.01%	0
Independent Group 03	8	3	2	10	8	3	5	5	1	45	0.01%	0
Motherland People's Party	2	2	20	2	4	4	3	3	2	42	0.01%	0
United Lanka People's Party	4	0	7	2	12	4	8	3	0	40	0.01%	0
Independent Group 02	7	2	3	7	3	2	3	3	1	31	0.00%	0
Sri Lanka National Force	3	2	2	5	4	4	3	4	0	27	0.00%	0
Democratic National Movement	3	1	2	3	1	3	4	1	2	20	0.00%	0
Sri Lanka Labour Party	3	1	1	2	1	1	1	1	1	12	0.00%	0
Valid Votes	73,528	102,699	87,340	60,513	92,200	87,305	78,927	87,541	27,582	697,637	100.00%	10
Rejected Votes	2,691	2,734	2,782	2,340	2,760	2,425	2,978	2,232	424	21,366	2.97%	
Total Polled	76,219	105,433	90,122	62,853	94,960	89,730	81,905	89,773	28,006	719,001	80.13%	
Registered Electors	100,040	133,887	117,033	82,133	122,511	117,931	108,996	114,828		897,349		

Preferential votes
Alliance	Party	Candidate	votes
UPFA	SLFP	Kumara Welgama	218,614
UNFGG	DNM	Rajitha Senaratne	142,196
UNFGG	UNP	Ajith Perera	131,383
UPFA	SLFP	Rohitha Abeygunawardena	127,040
UNFGG	UNP	Palitha Thewarapperuma	118,128
UPFA	NFF	Jayantha Samaraweera	101,139
UPFA	SLFP	Vidura Wickremenayake	90,488
UPFA	SLFP	Piyal Nishantha de Silva	71,428
UNFGG	UNP	Ananda Lakshman Wijemanna	58,219
JVP	JVP	Nalinda Jayatissa	24,853

=== 2020 parliamentary general election ===
Results of the 16th parliamentary election held on 5 August 2020:

Party	Votes per Polling Division								Postal Votes	Total Votes	%	Seats
Party	Agalawatta	Bandaragama	Beruwala	Bulathsinhala	Horana	Kalutara	Mathugama	Panadura	Postal Votes	Total Votes	%	Seats
Sri Lanka People's Freedom Alliance (Note: The alliance consisted of CWC, CPSL, DLF, DVJP, EPDP, LSSP, MEP, MTK, NC, NFF, PHU, SLMP, SLPP, TMVP, UPP & VDJS.)	48,038	69,327	47,098	39,321	66,361	52,344	49,991	52,533	23,686	448,699	64.08%	8
Samagi Jana Balawegaya (Note: The alliance consisted of JHU, SLMC, TPA (NUW, DPF, UCPF), ACMC, NLNP & JSP.)	17,504	22,469	34,029	15,077	17,510	18,582	19,005	21,416	6,396	171,988	24.56%	2
National People's Power (Note: Including JVP.)	2,488	5,227	3,322	1,838	4,267	5,111	3,328	5,344	2,589	33,434	4.77%	0
United National Party	1,481	2,481	1,236	1,520	1,573	2,251	2,873	1,967	1,183	16,485	2.35%	0
Sri Lanka Freedom Party	1,252	2,855	525	524	649	1,915	1,671	944	644	10,979	1.57%	0
Independent Group 01	56	276	1,152	195	68	3,614	516	172	158	6,207	0.89%	0
Independent Group 05	163	210	498	212	79	335	174	2,780	38	4,489	0.64%	0
Frontline Socialist Party	159	173	148	119	111	212	212	114	86	1,334	0.19%	0
National Development Front	124	129	119	115	157	191	135	135	29	1,132	0.16%	0
Independent Group 12	113	120	166	108	136	83	89	67	8	890	0.13%	0
United Socialist Party	104	56	112	87	96	60	91	56	15	677	0.1%	0
Independent Group 02	127	105	75	68	93	60	66	52	5	651	0.09%	0
Socialist Party of Sri Lanka	66	88	73	52	85	67	72	52	6	561	0.08%	0
Democratic United National Front	61	145	56	77	66	29	38	29	17	518	0.07%	0
Sinhaladeepa National Front	34	66	58	34	49	68	38	60	23	430	0.06%	0
Independent Group 13	47	34	73	36	88	31	46	28	4	387	0.06%	0
Independent Group 03	21	37	32	13	66	62	22	20	6	279	0.04%	0
Independent Group 04	30	37	28	36	19	21	36	15	9	231	0.03%	0
Independent Group 07	22	20	39	21	23	32	25	17	4	203	0.03%	0
Independent Group 08	23	26	25	16	17	28	19	25	10	189	0.03%	0
Independent Group 10	38	13	24	15	17	12	22	10	3	154	0.02%	0
Independent Group 09	17	12	24	18	18	16	18	9	2	134	0.02%	0
Independent Group 11	10	27	31	12	15	11	13	5	2	126	0.02%	0
Independent Group 06	10	8	8	10	8	7	11	12	5	79	0.01%	0
Valid Votes	71,828	103,941	88,951	59,524	91,571	85,142	78,509	85,862	34,928	1,182,776	100.00%	10
Rejected Votes	5,351	5,972	5,891	4,976	5,718	5,253	6,532	5,140	1,582	46,415	4.77%	
Total Polled	77,197	109,913	94,842	64,500	97,289	90,395	85,041	91,002	36,510	746,671	76.79%	
Registered Electors	100,140	143,708	123,063	83,201	130,927	120,922	111,541	120,770	37,777	972,319		

Preferential votes
Alliance	Party	Candidate	votes
SLPFA	SLPP	Vidura Wickremenayake	147,958
SLPFA	SLPP	Rohitha Abeygunawardena	147,478
SLPFA	SLPP	Sanjeeva Edirimanna	105,973
SLPFA	SLPP	Piyal Nishantha de Silva	103,904
SLPFA	NFF	Jayantha Samaraweera	85,287
SLPFA	SLPP	Anupa Pasqual	97,777
SJB	DNM	Rajitha Senaratne	77,476
SJB	NLFP	Kumara Welgama	77,083
SLPFA	SLPP	Lalith Ellawala	76,705
SLPFA	SLFP	Mahinda Samarasinghe	58,514

== Provincial council elections ==
=== 1988 provincial council election ===
Results of the 1st Western provincial council election held on 2 June 1988

Party	Total Votes	%	Seats
United National Party	127,270	50.36%	11
United Socialist Alliance (Note: Including the CPSL, LSSP, NSSP & SLMP)	105,697	41.83%	10
Sri Lanka Muslim Congress	18,029	7.13%	1
Liberal Party of Sri Lanka	1,701	0.67%	0
Valid Votes	252,697	100.00%	23

=== 1993 provincial council election ===
Results of the 2nd Western provincial council election held on 17 May 1993:

Party	Votes	%	Seats
United National Party	192,269	44.17%	10
People's Alliance (Note: Including the SLFP et al.)	171,451	39.39%	9
Democratic United National Front	59,864	13.75%	3
Sri Lanka Muslim Congress	6,398	1.47%	1
Nava Sama Samaja Party	3,704	0.85%	0
People's Freedom Front	1,633	0.36%	0
Valid Votes	435,319	100.00%	23

=== 1999 provincial council election ===
Results of the 3rd Western provincial council election held on 10 July 2004 for the district:

Party	Votes per Polling Division								Postal Votes	Total Votes	%	Seats
Party	Agalawatta	Bandaragama	Beruwala	Bulathsinhala	Horana	Kalutara	Mathugama	Panadura	Postal Votes	Total Votes	%	Seats
United National Party	25,039	27,165	23,873	22,452	25,534	26,142	24,371	22,480	1,708	199,054	44.16%	10
People's; Alliance (Note: Including SLFP et al.)	20,774	29,850	27,388	18,212	24,539	23,972	22,723	28,925	2,319	198,702	44.08%	10
Janatha Vimukthi Peramuna	3,245	4,203	3,121	1,464	3,934	3,996	3,630	4,467	287	28,347	6.29%	2
Sri Lanka Muslim Congress	74	617	2,499	227	77	1,656	324	1,752	4	7,230	1.6%	1
Mahajana Eksath Peramuna	453	810	634	506	1,620	531	1,319	1,178	98	7,149	1.59%	0
New Left; Front (Note: Including NSSP et al.)	928	758	445	370	789	636	818	659	26	5,427	1.2%	0
National Union of Workers (Note: CWC, DWC et al.)	523	121	165	1,060	1,100	149	810	116	7	4,051	0.9%	0
Muslim United Liberation Front	67	73	76	51	80	80	74	66	0	567	0.13%	0
Sri Lanka Progressive Front	54	12	12	12	19	30	24	43	3	209	0.05%	0
Valid Votes	51,427	63,809	58,233	44,354	57,692	57,192	54,091	59,686	4,452	400,736	100.00%	23
Rejected Votes	3,437	3,466	3,309	3,040	3,677	3,916	3,759	3,632	210	28,491	5.94%	
Total Polled	54,864	67,075	61,542	47,394	61,364	61,108	57,850	63,318	4,462	479,177	70.78%	
Registered Electors	81,475	92,160	86,398	65,666	84,988	90,192	83,837	92,246		676,962		

The following candidates were elected:

Preferential votes
Party	Candidate	votes
UNP	Kitsiri Kahatapitiya	39,171
PA	Tudor Dayaratne	31,969
UNP	Bandula Parakrama Gunawardhene	28,818
UNP	P. D. Abeyratne	28,087
UNP	Ananda Lakshman Wijemanne	27,458
PA	Nirmala Kotalawala	26,673
PA	Erni Yasathilaka	24,438
PA	Rohitha Abeygunawardena	23,702
UNP	Mohomad Yoosuf	23,457
PA	Thilakasiri Perera	23,404
UNP	Sujith Kumara Deshapriya	22,762
UNP	Hemantha Wickremarachchi	22,017
PA	Ranjith Somawansha	21,352
UNP	Kitsiri Samaranayake	20,921
PA	Mohomed Faleel	20,215
UNP	Sanajaya Galaboda	19,998
UNP	Anil Kumara Wijesinghe	19,738
PA	W. K. Wijesiri	19,672
PA	Sumithlal Mendis	17,921
PA	S. A. Premaratne	17,055
SLMC	M. S. M. Aslam	2,460
JVP	I. A. Wijesiri	2,118
JVP	Champika Samanmalee	2,061

=== 2004 provincial council election ===
Results of the 4th Western provincial council election held on 10 July 2004 for the district:

Party	Votes per Polling Division								Postal Votes	Total Votes	%	Seats
Party	Agalawatta	Bandaragama	Beruwala	Bulathsinhala	Horana	Kalutara	Mathugama	Panadura	Postal Votes	Total Votes	%	Seats
United People's Freedom Alliance (Note: Including SLFP, JVP et al.)	26,811	35,838	24,363	19,537	29,468	28,073	26,259	29,543	5,022	224,914	57.27%	12
United National Party (Note: Including CWC, UNP.)	18,944	16,363	16,974	15,066	19,388	16,241	20,838	15,333	2,189	141,336	35.99%	7
Sri Lanka Muslim Congress	204	2,974	9,547	585	40	3,760	711	5,070	35	22,926	5.84%	1
United Socialist Party	258	242	295	256	268	255	325	216	10	2,125	0.54%	0
National Development Front	104	166	104	81	105	97	97	113	5	872	0.22%	0
Independent Group 3	22	21	29	31	19	14	45	26	1	208	0.05%	0
Independent Group 2	15	23	15	21	27	18	24	24	6	173	0.04%	0
Independent Group 1	16	25	16	11	14	13	18	26	5	144	0.04%	0
Valid Votes	46,374	55,652	51,343	35,588	49,329	48,471	48,317	50,351	7,273	392,698	100.00%	20
Rejected Votes	3,101	3,504	3,265	2,561	3,469	3,367	3,276	3,592	490	26,625		
Total Polled	49,475	59,156	54,608	38,149	52,798	51,838	51,593	53,943	7,763	419,323		
Registered Electors	88,142	104,093	96,897	69,720	96,686	99,940	90,919	99,741		746,138		
Turnout	56.13%	56.83%	56.36%	54.72%	54.61%	51.87%	56.75%	54.08%		56.20%		

The following candidates were elected:

Preferential votes
Party	Candidate	votes
UPFA	Reginald Cooray	94,316
UNP	Kitsiri Kahatapitiya	50,013
UPFA	Ajith Anura Thalangama	34,826
UPFA	Vaas Gunawardhene	34,165
UPFA	Ranjith Somawansha	32,515
UPFA	Athula Priyantha Bellana	32,206
UPFA	Thilakasiri Perera	30,661
UPFA	Nimal Chandraratne	29,441
UNP	Palitha Thewarapperuma	29,167
UPFA	Chandrasiri Karunaratne	28,862
UPFA	Ananda Karunadhara	28,621
UPFA	Jagath Pushpakumara Perera	28,449
UPFA	A. Chandrabhanu	26,626
UPFA	Janak Chaminda Wijegunawardhene	23,261
UNP	Srima Ramani Kariyawasam	21,287
UNP	Mohomad Yoosuf	19,165
UNP	Anil Kumara Wijesinghe	17,306
UNP	Piyal Jayantha	17,058
UPFA	Prasanna Palihakkara	15,472
SLMC	M. S. M. Aslam	9,477

=== 2009 provincial council election ===
Results of the 5th Western provincial council election held on 25 April 2009 for the district:

Party	Votes per Polling Division								Postal Votes	Total Votes	%	Seats
Party	Agalawatta	Bandaragama	Beruwala	Bulathsinhala	Horana	Kalutara	Mathugama	Panadura	Postal Votes	Total Votes	%	Seats
United People's Freedom Alliance (Note: Including SLFP et al.)	37,558	55,404	38,980	33,317	51,919	42,102	39,114	44,923	7,898	351,215	69.58%	14
United National Party	13,682	17,148	14,253	11,069	14,897	16,637	15,807	18,968	1,965	124,426	24.65%	5
Janatha Vimukthi Peramuna	1,044	2,200	1,492	1,151	1,385	1,876	1,723	1,857	378	13,106	2.60%	1
Sri Lanka Muslim Congress	301	623	7,958	490	17	1,347	653	985	22	12,396	2.46%	0
Democratic Unity Alliance	34	65	468	48	26	635	163	519	4	1,962	0.39%	0
United Socialist Party	103	85	89	47	61	74	100	114	3	676	0.13%	0
National Development Front	54	46	41	53	38	30	47	39	1	349	0.07%	0
Independent Group 5	20	5	13	6	12	7	27	11	0	101	0.02%	0
Independent Group 4	4	22	11	8	6	6	22	7	1	87	0.02%	0
Independent Group 1	19	6	16	14	9	7	8	3	1	83	0.02%	0
Independent Group 6	12	6	10	14	10	5	14	12	0	83	0.02%	0
United Lanka Great Council	15	7	7	10	2	8	18	5	2	74	0.01%	0
Sri Lanka Progressive Front	5	7	15	6	17	7	8	3	2	70	0.01%	0
Patriotic National Front	10	5	5	7	5	3	18	3	1	57	0.01%	0
Independent Group 2	7	7	1	3	7	4	7	12	3	51	0.01%	0
Independent Group 3	5	4	5	4	7	9	8	2	1	45	0.01%	0
Valid Votes	52,873	75,640	63,364	46,247	68,418	62,757	57,737	67,463	10,282	504,781	100.00%	20
Rejected Votes	2,790	2,840	2,864	2,506	2,484	2,766	2,903	2,296	254	21,703		
Total Polled	55,663	78,480	66,228	48,753	70,902	65,523	60,640	69,759	10,536	526,484		
Registered Electors	92,898	116,018	103,273	74,111	106,432	105,661	97,739	105,194		801,326		
Turnout	59.92%	67.64%	64.13%	65.78%	66.62%	62.01%	62.04%	66.31%		65.70%		

The following candidates were elected:

Preferential votes
Party	Candidate	votes
UPFA	Reginald Cooray	72,951
UPFA	Vidura Wickremanayake	63,385
UPFA	Vikum Gunasekara	55,338
UPFA	Ranjith Somawansha	54,099
UPFA	Lalith Ellawala	48,453
UPFA	Piyal Nishantha de Silva	47,540
UPFA	Yasapala Koralage	46,146
UPFA	Nimal Chandraratne	41,982
UPFA	Thilakasiri Perera	38,090
UPFA	A. Chandrabanu	34,929
UPFA	Lalith Warnakumara	31,791
UPFA	Sumithlal Mendis	31,702
UPFA	Keerthi Kariyawasam	30,475
UPFA	Chandrasiri Karunaratna	28,870
UNP	Ajith Perera	28,567
UNP	Palitha Thewarapperuma	28,450
UNP	Ananda Lakshman Wijemanne	27,797
UNP	Kitsiri Kahatapitiya	20,147
UNP	P. D. Abeyratne	16,656
JVP	Nalinda Jayatissa	1,393

=== 2014 provincial council election ===
Results of the 6th Western provincial council election held on 29 March 2014:

Party	Votes per Polling Division								Postal Votes	Total Votes	%	Seats
Party	Agalawatta	Bandaragama	Beruwala	Bulathsinhala	Horana	Kalutara	Mathugama	Panadura	Postal Votes	Total Votes	%	Seats
United People's Freedom Alliance (Note: Including SLFP et al.)	39,488	54,019	39,715	33,226	44,988	38,777	38,792	37,690	11,229	337,924	58.9%	13
United National Party	14,840	16,087	24,615	11,357	14,948	21,639	17,101	21,558	2,779	144,924	25.26%	6
Democratic; Party	3,171	8,997	3,283	2,631	5,315	5,275	5,997	6,694	2,322	43,685	7.62%	2
Janatha Vimukthi Peramuna	2,003	3,768	2,664	1,455	3,949	3,851	2,593	4,110	973	25,366	4.42%	1
Sri Lanka Muslim Congress	71	1,203	4,868	392	14	2,892	790	1,803	23	12,056	2.1%	0
Ceylon Workers' Congress	757	115	49	775	1,355	60	1,198	8	14	4,331	0.75%	0
Independent; Group 3	26	167	43	15	23	127	61	887	19	1,368	0.24%	0
Jana Setha Peramuna	34	421	13	30	214	39	44	169	47	1,011	0.18%	0
United Socialist Party	76	99	63	65	106	84	85	138	13	739	0.13%	0
All Citizens are All Kings Organization	13	10	4	5	300	10	13	12	8	375	0.06%	0
United Lanka Great Council	34	66	27	33	39	33	56	49	7	344	0.06%	0
Patriotic National Front	24	61	26	15	31	34	45	43	13	292	0.05%	0
United Lanka People's Party	21	26	32	21	45	33	39	27	11	255	0.04%	0
Independent; Group 9	25	39	28	17	32	24	30	18	3	216	0.04%	0
Independent; Group 5	27	18	4	20	15	13	29	13	4	143	0.02%	0
Independent; Group 2	16	13	11	25	21	9	16	12	6	129	0.02%	0
Independent; Group 1	5	21	5	13	23	7	9	13	2	98	0.02%	0
Independent; Group 8	7	15	6	11	20	11	13	8	3	94	0.02%	0
Independent; Group 6	15	12	10	5	23	6	7	12	2	92	0.02%	0
Independent; Group 4	9	10	19	7	4	10	14	8	1	82	0.01%	0
Independent; Group 7	4	13	9	8	9	10	12	7	1	73	0.01%	0
Sri Lanka Labour Party	2	5	6	3	17	5	12	5	1	56	0.01%	0
Valid Votes	60,688	85,185	75,500	50,129	71,491	72,949	66,956	73,294	17,481	573,653	100.00%	22
Rejected Votes	3,449	3,886	3,515	2,857	3,801	3,821	3,645	3,086	750	28,810	4.78%	
Total Polled	64,117	89,071	79,015	52,986	75,292	76,770	70,770	76,308	18,231	602,463	68.32%	
Registered Electors	99,146	131,024	114,791	81,045	119,927	116,212	107,144	112,555		881,814		

The following candidates were elected:

Preferential votes
Party	Candidate	votes
UPFA	Senal Welgama	115,385
UPFA	Rohana Priyankara	51,539
UPFA	Yasapala Koralage	42,395
UPFA	Thilakasiri Perera	40,962
UPFA	Ranjith Somawansha	40,863
UPFA	Piyal Nishantha de Silva	26,673
UPFA	Nimal Chandraratne	37,674
UPFA	Sumithlal Mendis	33,388
UPFA	Lalith Ellawala	32,580
UPFA	Lalith Varna Kumara	30,079
UNP	Jagath Premalal	29,920
UPFA	Sunethra Lal Fernando	25,453
UPFA	Prasanna Sanjeewa	25,140
UPFA	Keerthi Kariyawasam	24,921
UNP	Mohamed Ifthikar	24,576
UNP	P. D. Abeyratne	20,797
UNP	Vijith Priyantha Silva	19,727
UNP	Kitsiri Kahatapitiya	19,492
UNP	Nihal Premachandra	18,773
DP	Ravindra Yasas	12,885
DP	Anura Deepal	12,469
JVP	Nalinda Jayatissa	11,949
