= Vithana =

Vithana is a surname. Notable people with the surname include:

- Harsha Vithana (born 1985), Sri Lankan cricketer
- Kim Vithana (born 1969), English actress
- Pujitha Vithana (fl. 1988), Sri Lankan admiral
- Shehana Vithana (born 1999), Sri Lankan-Australian squash player
- Jagath Vithana (fl. 2024), Sri Lankan politician
