= Sarath Ranawaka =

Sri Lankan politician

Hon. Sarath Ranawaka

Member of Parliament for Kalutara
- In office 1989–2000
- In office 2004–2009
- Succeeded by: Ananda Lakshman Wijemanna

Personal details
- Born: 15 July 1951 Kalutara, Sri Lanka
- Died: 25 July 2009 (aged 58) Sri Jayawardenapura Kotte
- Party: United National Party
- Children: Angana Ranawaka
- Education: Nalanda College Colombo
- Occupation: Politics

Jayasiri Sarath Kumara Ranawaka (15 July 1951 – 25 July 2009) was a Member of Parliament representing Kalutara Electoral District.

He was educated at Nalanda College Colombo.

Ranawaka was first elected to parliament as the United National Party candidate at the 9th parliamentary election, held on 15 February 1989, for multi-member electoral district of Kalutura. He was re-elected at the 10th parliamentary election, held on 16 August 1994. He failed to get re-elected at the 11th parliamentary election, held on 10 October 2000, but was successful at the 13th parliamentary election, held on 2 April 2004, where he stood as one of the United National Front/United National Party candidates.

Ranawaka died on the morning of 25 July 2009 at Sri Jayawardenapura General Hospital. His parliamentary replacement, Ananda Lakshman Wijemanna, was sworn in on 6 August 2009.
