= Kottahachchi =

Kottahachchi is a Sinhalese surname. Notable people with the surname include:

- Nilanthi Kottahachchi (born 1989), Sri Lankan politician
- Ravindra Kottahachchi (born 1975), Sri Lankan cricket umpire
- Rohitha Kottahachchi (born 1971), Sri Lankan cricketer
