= Reginald Cooray =

Sri Lankan politician (1947–2023)

Hon. Reginald Cooray MP MPC

5th Governor of the Northern Province
- In office 16 February 2016 – 31 December 2018
- President: Maithripala Sirisena
- Preceded by: H. M. G. S. Palihakkara
- Succeeded by: Sarath Ekanayake

12th Governor of the Central Province
- In office 12 April 2018 – 13 April 2018
- President: Maithripala Sirisena
- Preceded by: Niluka Ekanayake
- Succeeded by: P. B. Dissanayake

5th Chief Minister of the Western Province
- In office 3 July 2005 – 4 May 2009
- Preceded by: Nandana Mendis
- Succeeded by: Prasanna Ranatunga
- In office 9 November 2000 – 22 June 2005
- Preceded by: Susil Premajayanth
- Succeeded by: Nandana Mendis

Member of Parliament for Kalutara District
- In office 2010 – 26 June 2015
- In office 2004 – 28 May 2004
- Succeeded by: Nirmala Kotalawala
- In office 1994–2000
- Succeeded by: Parakrama Bandula Gunawardene

Personal details
- Born: 12 November 1947 Wadduwa, British Ceylon
- Died: 13 January 2023 (aged 75) Kalutara, Sri Lanka
- Party: Sri Lanka Freedom Party
- Other political affiliations: United People's Freedom Alliance
- Profession: Teacher

Reginald Cooray (12 November 1947 – 13 January 2023) was a Sri Lankan teacher and politician. He was a provincial chief minister, a government minister, and governor of the Northern Province. He was briefly governor of the Central Province in April 2018, his tenure lasting less than 24 hours, making it the shortest of any governorship in Sri Lankan history.

== Personal life and death ==
Cooray was born on 12 November 1947. He was a Roman Catholic and a wealthy land owner. Cooray's wife died in July 2011. His daughter Muditha Sanjeewani died in December 2013.

Cooray died of a heart attack on 13 January 2023, aged 75.

== Political career ==
Cooray was an English teacher by profession. He started his political career with the Janatha Vimukthi Peramuna (JVP). He contested the 1977 parliamentary election as an independent candidate in Beruwala but failed to get elected. He later joined Vijaya Kumaratunga's Sri Lanka Mahajana Pakshaya (SLMP).

In 1988, the Communist Party, Lanka Sama Samaja Party, Nava Sama Samaja Party and SLMP formed the United Socialist Alliance (USA). Cooray was a member of the 1st and 2nd Western Provincial Councils (WPC). Cooray was one of the USA's candidates in the Kalutara District in the 1989 parliamentary election but the USA failed to win any seats in the district. In 1993, the USA and Sri Lanka Freedom Party (SLFP) formed the People's Alliance (PA). Cooray was one of the PA's candidates in Kalutara at the 1994 parliamentary election. He was elected and entered Parliament. He was re-elected in the 2000 parliamentary election. He was appointed Minister of Ethnic Affairs and National Integration after the election. However, shortly afterwards he was appointed to the WPC and on 9 November 2000 he became Chief Minister of the Western Province.

On 20 January 2004, the SLFP and the JVP formed the United People's Freedom Alliance (UPFA). Cooray contested the 2004 parliamentary election as one of the UPFA's candidates in Kalutara District and was re-elected to Parliament. He was appointed Minister of Information and Media after the election.

Cooray contested the 2004 provincial council election as one of the UPFA's candidates in Kalutara District and was elected to the WPC. Cooray was accused of accepting bribes from private operators in return for bus route permits and of nepotism. Facing a no-confidence motion over corruption and abuse of power, Cooray resigned in June 2005. A few days later he was re-appointed Chief Minister. He was re-elected at the 2009 provincial council election but lost his chief ministerial position.

Cooray contested the 2010 parliamentary election as one of the UPFA's candidates in Kalutara District and was re-elected to Parliament. He was appointed Deputy Minister of Justice after the election. He was appointed Minister of Minor Export Promotion in November 2010. He lost his cabinet position following the 2015 presidential election but a few days after the election he pledged his support for newly-elected President Maithripala Sirisena. In March 2015 Cooray was questioned by the Commission to Investigate Allegations of Bribery or Corruption (CIABOC). A few days later, when the SLFP joined the national government, he was appointed Minister of Aviation. Cooray did not contest the 2015 parliamentary election for financial reasons. He was however placed on the UPFA's list of National List candidates. However, after the election he was not appointed to the National List.

Cooray was appointed Governor of Northern Province in February 2016. On 12 April 2018, he was sworn in as Governor of the Central Province. Less than 24 hours later on the morning of the 13th, he was sworn in as Governor of the Northern Province, and his governorship of the Central Province revoked, going to P. B. Dissanayake. The revocation has been attributed to an objection by senior Buddhist clergy from the Central Province on the basis of Cooray's Catholic faith and non-Govigama caste.

== Electoral history ==
Electoral history of Reginald Cooray
Election	Constituency	Party	Alliance	Votes	Result
1977 parliamentary	Beruwala	Ind		54	Not elected
1989 parliamentary	Kalutara District	SLMP	USA	4,956	Not elected
1994 parliamentary	Kalutara District	SLFP	PA	85,297	Elected
2000 parliamentary	Kalutara District	SLFP	PA	67,945	Elected
2004 parliamentary	Kalutara District	SLFP	UPFA	78,693	Elected
2004 provincial	Kalutara District	SLFP	UPFA	94,316	Elected
2009 provincial	Kalutara District	SLFP	UPFA	72,951	Elected
2010 parliamentary	Kalutara District	SLFP	UPFA	60,196	Elected

Political offices
Preceded by H. M. G. S. Palihakkara	Governor of Northern Province; 2016–2018	Succeeded by Sarath Ekanayake
Preceded by Niluka Ekanayake	Governor of Central Province; 2018	Succeeded by P. B. Dissanayake
