= Bandaragama Polling Division =

Bandaragama
- Polling Division
- Coordinates: 6.680735°N 80.011979°E
- Country: Sri Lanka
- Province: Western Province, Sri Lanka
- Electoral District: Kalutara Electoral District

Area
  - Total: 143.24 km^{2} (55.31 sq mi)

Population (2012)
  - Total: 161,412
  - Density: 1,127/km^{2} (2,920/sq mi)
- ISO 3166 code: EC-03B

The Bandaragama Polling Division is a Polling Division in the Kalutara Electoral District, in the Western Province, Sri Lanka.

== Presidential Election Results ==
=== Summary ===
The winner of Bandaragama has matched the final country result 6 out of 8 times.

| Year | Bandaragama | Kalutara Electoral District | MAE % | Sri Lanka | MAE % |
|---|---|---|---|---|---|
| 2019 | SLPP | SLPP | 2.53% | SLPP | 9.24% |
| 2015 | UPFA | UPFA | 2.64% | NDF | 7.51% |
| 2010 | UPFA | UPFA | 1.87% | UPFA | 6.74% |
| 2005 | UPFA | UPFA | 2.94% | UPFA | 8.08% |
| 1999 | PA | PA | 2.02% | PA | 3.72% |
| 1994 | PA | PA | 0.74% | PA | 0.19% |
| 1988 | SLFP | SLFP | 0.66% | UNP | 3.34% |
| 1982 | UNP | UNP | 1.89% | UNP | 5.31% |
| Matches/Mean MAE | 6/8 | 6/8 | 1.91% | 8/8 | 5.52% |

=== 2019 Sri Lankan Presidential Election ===
| Party | Bandaragama | | Kalutara Electoral District | | Sri Lanka | |
| Party | Votes | % | Votes | % | Votes | % |
|---|---|---|---|---|---|---|
| SLPP | 74,879 | 62.17% | 482,920 | 59.49% | 6,924,255 | 52.25% |
| NDF | 38,981 | 32.37% | 284,213 | 35.01% | 5,564,239 | 41.99% |
| NMPP | 4,312 | 3.58% | 27,681 | 3.41% | 418,553 | 3.16% |
| Other Parties (with < 1%) | 2,265 | 1.88% | 16,949 | 2.09% | 345,452 | 2.61% |
| Valid Votes | 120,437 | 99.22% | 811,763 | 99.16% | 13,252,499 | 98.99% |
| Rejected Votes | 944 | 0.78% | 6,847 | 0.84% | 135,452 | 1.01% |
| Total Polled | 121,381 | 86.58% | 818,610 | 85.71% | 13,387,951 | 83.71% |
| Registered Electors | 140,199 | | 955,080 | | 15,992,568 | |

=== 2015 Sri Lankan Presidential Election ===
| Party | Bandaragama | | Kalutara Electoral District | | Sri Lanka | |
| Party | Votes | % | Votes | % | Votes | % |
|---|---|---|---|---|---|---|
| UPFA | 61,199 | 55.32% | 395,890 | 52.65% | 5,768,090 | 47.58% |
| NDF | 48,469 | 43.81% | 349,404 | 46.46% | 6,217,162 | 51.28% |
| Other Parties (with < 1%) | 960 | 0.87% | 6,690 | 0.89% | 138,200 | 1.14% |
| Valid Votes | 110,628 | 99.11% | 751,984 | 98.90% | 12,123,452 | 98.85% |
| Rejected Votes | 999 | 0.89% | 8,381 | 1.10% | 140,925 | 1.15% |
| Total Polled | 111,627 | 83.37% | 760,365 | 82.08% | 12,264,377 | 78.69% |
| Registered Electors | 133,887 | | 926,346 | | 15,585,942 | |

=== 2010 Sri Lankan Presidential Election ===
| Party | Bandaragama | | Kalutara Electoral District | | Sri Lanka | |
| Party | Votes | % | Votes | % | Votes | % |
|---|---|---|---|---|---|---|
| UPFA | 62,363 | 65.03% | 412,562 | 63.06% | 6,015,934 | 57.88% |
| NDF | 32,290 | 33.67% | 231,807 | 35.43% | 4,173,185 | 40.15% |
| Other Parties (with < 1%) | 1,239 | 1.29% | 9,880 | 1.51% | 204,494 | 1.97% |
| Valid Votes | 95,892 | 99.42% | 654,249 | 99.31% | 10,393,613 | 99.03% |
| Rejected Votes | 558 | 0.58% | 4,541 | 0.69% | 101,838 | 0.97% |
| Total Polled | 96,450 | 81.09% | 658,790 | 79.05% | 10,495,451 | 66.70% |
| Registered Electors | 118,942 | | 833,360 | | 15,734,587 | |

=== 2005 Sri Lankan Presidential Election ===
| Party | Bandaragama | | Kalutara Electoral District | | Sri Lanka | |
| Party | Votes | % | Votes | % | Votes | % |
|---|---|---|---|---|---|---|
| UPFA | 50,481 | 58.50% | 341,693 | 55.48% | 4,887,152 | 50.29% |
| UNP | 34,749 | 40.27% | 266,043 | 43.20% | 4,706,366 | 48.43% |
| Other Parties (with < 1%) | 1,061 | 1.23% | 8,124 | 1.32% | 123,521 | 1.27% |
| Valid Votes | 86,291 | 99.00% | 615,860 | 98.95% | 9,717,039 | 98.88% |
| Rejected Votes | 870 | 1.00% | 6,517 | 1.05% | 109,869 | 1.12% |
| Total Polled | 87,161 | 81.23% | 622,377 | 79.67% | 9,826,908 | 69.51% |
| Registered Electors | 107,308 | | 781,175 | | 14,136,979 | |

=== 1999 Sri Lankan Presidential Election ===
| Party | Bandaragama | | Kalutara Electoral District | | Sri Lanka | |
| Party | Votes | % | Votes | % | Votes | % |
|---|---|---|---|---|---|---|
| PA | 40,384 | 55.05% | 281,217 | 52.88% | 4,312,157 | 51.12% |
| UNP | 28,430 | 38.76% | 217,423 | 40.88% | 3,602,748 | 42.71% |
| JVP | 3,262 | 4.45% | 23,770 | 4.47% | 343,927 | 4.08% |
| Other Parties (with < 1%) | 1,278 | 1.74% | 9,399 | 1.77% | 176,679 | 2.09% |
| Valid Votes | 73,354 | 98.04% | 531,809 | 97.83% | 8,435,754 | 97.69% |
| Rejected Votes | 1,467 | 1.96% | 11,796 | 2.17% | 199,536 | 2.31% |
| Total Polled | 74,821 | 80.36% | 543,605 | 78.23% | 8,635,290 | 72.17% |
| Registered Electors | 93,107 | | 694,860 | | 11,965,536 | |

=== 1994 Sri Lankan Presidential Election ===
| Party | Bandaragama | | Kalutara Electoral District | | Sri Lanka | |
| Party | Votes | % | Votes | % | Votes | % |
|---|---|---|---|---|---|---|
| PA | 40,503 | 62.22% | 295,686 | 61.47% | 4,709,205 | 62.28% |
| UNP | 23,655 | 36.34% | 178,466 | 37.10% | 2,715,283 | 35.91% |
| Other Parties (with < 1%) | 942 | 1.45% | 6,867 | 1.43% | 137,040 | 1.81% |
| Valid Votes | 65,100 | 98.59% | 481,019 | 98.50% | 7,561,526 | 98.03% |
| Rejected Votes | 929 | 1.41% | 7,309 | 1.50% | 151,706 | 1.97% |
| Total Polled | 66,029 | 76.18% | 488,328 | 73.97% | 7,713,232 | 69.12% |
| Registered Electors | 86,676 | | 660,191 | | 11,158,880 | |

=== 1988 Sri Lankan Presidential Election ===
| Party | Bandaragama | | Kalutara Electoral District | | Sri Lanka | |
| Party | Votes | % | Votes | % | Votes | % |
|---|---|---|---|---|---|---|
| SLFP | 26,897 | 48.71% | 179,761 | 49.57% | 2,289,857 | 44.95% |
| UNP | 26,066 | 47.20% | 169,510 | 46.74% | 2,569,199 | 50.43% |
| SLMP | 2,261 | 4.09% | 13,375 | 3.69% | 235,701 | 4.63% |
| Valid Votes | 55,224 | 98.45% | 362,646 | 98.23% | 5,094,754 | 98.24% |
| Rejected Votes | 871 | 1.55% | 6,537 | 1.77% | 91,499 | 1.76% |
| Total Polled | 56,095 | 76.23% | 369,183 | 64.20% | 5,186,256 | 55.87% |
| Registered Electors | 73,585 | | 575,008 | | 9,283,143 | |

=== 1982 Sri Lankan Presidential Election ===
| Party | Bandaragama | | Kalutara Electoral District | | Sri Lanka | |
| Party | Votes | % | Votes | % | Votes | % |
|---|---|---|---|---|---|---|
| UNP | 26,631 | 48.81% | 211,592 | 50.15% | 3,450,815 | 52.93% |
| SLFP | 25,500 | 46.74% | 185,874 | 44.06% | 2,546,348 | 39.05% |
| JVP | 1,583 | 2.90% | 14,499 | 3.44% | 273,428 | 4.19% |
| LSSP | 730 | 1.34% | 8,613 | 2.04% | 58,531 | 0.90% |
| Other Parties (with < 1%) | 116 | 0.21% | 1,314 | 0.31% | 190,929 | 2.93% |
| Valid Votes | 54,560 | 98.86% | 421,892 | 98.76% | 6,520,156 | 98.78% |
| Rejected Votes | 628 | 1.14% | 5,290 | 1.24% | 80,470 | 1.22% |
| Total Polled | 55,188 | 84.89% | 427,182 | 83.97% | 6,600,626 | 80.15% |
| Registered Electors | 65,013 | | 508,744 | | 8,235,358 | |

== Parliamentary Election Results ==
=== Summary ===
The winner of Bandaragama has matched the final country result 6 out of 7 times.

| Year | Bandaragama | Kalutara Electoral District | MAE % | Sri Lanka | MAE % |
|---|---|---|---|---|---|
| 2015 | UPFA | UPFA | 3.22% | UNP | 6.26% |
| 2010 | UPFA | UPFA | 0.64% | UPFA | 3.06% |
| 2004 | UPFA | UPFA | 2.15% | UPFA | 4.96% |
| 2001 | UNP | UNP | 2.05% | UNP | 3.36% |
| 2000 | PA | PA | 1.93% | PA | 2.77% |
| 1994 | PA | PA | 1.52% | PA | 3.94% |
| 1989 | UNP | UNP | 2.55% | UNP | 5.62% |
| Matches/Mean MAE | 6/7 | 6/7 | 2.01% | 7/7 | 4.28% |

=== 2015 Sri Lankan Parliamentary Election ===
| Party | Bandaragama | | Kalutara Electoral District | | Sri Lanka | |
| Party | Votes | % | Votes | % | Votes | % |
|---|---|---|---|---|---|---|
| UPFA | 53,314 | 51.92% | 338,801 | 48.58% | 4,732,664 | 42.48% |
| UNP | 42,069 | 40.97% | 310,234 | 44.48% | 5,098,916 | 45.77% |
| JVP | 6,180 | 6.02% | 38,475 | 5.52% | 544,154 | 4.88% |
| Other Parties (with < 1%) | 1,118 | 1.09% | 9,951 | 1.43% | 85,579 | 0.77% |
| Valid Votes | 102,681 | 97.39% | 697,461 | 97.00% | 11,140,333 | 95.35% |
| Rejected Votes | 2,734 | 2.59% | 21,366 | 2.97% | 516,926 | 4.42% |
| Total Polled | 105,433 | 78.75% | 719,001 | 80.13% | 11,684,111 | 77.66% |
| Registered Electors | 133,887 | | 897,349 | | 15,044,490 | |

=== 2010 Sri Lankan Parliamentary Election ===
| Party | Bandaragama | | Kalutara Electoral District | | Sri Lanka | |
| Party | Votes | % | Votes | % | Votes | % |
|---|---|---|---|---|---|---|
| UPFA | 44,927 | 64.11% | 313,836 | 63.74% | 4,846,388 | 60.38% |
| UNP | 19,017 | 27.14% | 139,596 | 28.35% | 2,357,057 | 29.37% |
| DNA | 5,803 | 8.28% | 36,722 | 7.46% | 441,251 | 5.50% |
| Other Parties (with < 1%) | 334 | 0.48% | 2,246 | 0.46% | 34,923 | 0.44% |
| Valid Votes | 70,081 | 90.71% | 492,400 | 90.41% | 8,026,322 | 96.03% |
| Rejected Votes | 7,122 | 9.22% | 51,751 | 9.50% | 581,465 | 6.96% |
| Total Polled | 77,258 | 64.95% | 544,606 | 65.21% | 8,358,246 | 59.29% |
| Registered Electors | 118,942 | | 835,186 | | 14,097,690 | |

=== 2004 Sri Lankan Parliamentary Election ===
| Party | Bandaragama | | Kalutara Electoral District | | Sri Lanka | |
| Party | Votes | % | Votes | % | Votes | % |
|---|---|---|---|---|---|---|
| UPFA | 41,850 | 53.38% | 291,208 | 51.72% | 4,223,126 | 45.70% |
| UNP | 27,240 | 34.74% | 212,721 | 37.78% | 3,486,792 | 37.73% |
| JHU | 8,989 | 11.46% | 56,615 | 10.06% | 552,723 | 5.98% |
| Other Parties (with < 1%) | 326 | 0.42% | 2,475 | 0.44% | 49,030 | 0.53% |
| Valid Votes | 78,405 | 95.35% | 563,019 | 94.82% | 9,241,931 | 94.52% |
| Rejected Votes | 3,826 | 4.65% | 30,741 | 5.18% | 534,452 | 5.47% |
| Total Polled | 82,231 | 79.00% | 593,760 | 79.58% | 9,777,821 | 75.74% |
| Registered Electors | 104,093 | | 746,138 | | 12,909,631 | |

=== 2001 Sri Lankan Parliamentary Election ===
| Party | Bandaragama | | Kalutara Electoral District | | Sri Lanka | |
| Party | Votes | % | Votes | % | Votes | % |
|---|---|---|---|---|---|---|
| UNP | 33,272 | 43.46% | 254,339 | 45.94% | 4,086,026 | 45.62% |
| PA | 32,966 | 43.06% | 226,468 | 40.91% | 3,330,815 | 37.19% |
| JVP | 8,544 | 11.16% | 60,451 | 10.92% | 815,353 | 9.10% |
| Other Parties (with < 1%) | 928 | 1.21% | 7,258 | 1.31% | 86,426 | 0.97% |
| SU | 845 | 1.10% | 5,103 | 0.92% | 50,665 | 0.57% |
| Valid Votes | 76,555 | 95.14% | 553,619 | 94.44% | 8,955,844 | 94.77% |
| Rejected Votes | 3,912 | 4.86% | 32,617 | 5.56% | 494,009 | 5.23% |
| Total Polled | 80,467 | 81.39% | 586,236 | 81.68% | 9,449,878 | 76.03% |
| Registered Electors | 98,871 | | 717,764 | | 12,428,762 | |

=== 2000 Sri Lankan Parliamentary Election ===
| Party | Bandaragama | | Kalutara Electoral District | | Sri Lanka | |
| Party | Votes | % | Votes | % | Votes | % |
|---|---|---|---|---|---|---|
| PA | 35,860 | 48.47% | 255,175 | 46.86% | 3,899,329 | 45.33% |
| UNP | 27,434 | 37.08% | 217,215 | 39.89% | 3,451,765 | 40.12% |
| JVP | 5,534 | 7.48% | 38,373 | 7.05% | 518,725 | 6.03% |
| SU | 2,760 | 3.73% | 15,619 | 2.87% | 127,859 | 1.49% |
| NUA | 1,688 | 2.28% | 11,943 | 2.19% | 185,593 | 2.16% |
| Other Parties (with < 1%) | 705 | 0.95% | 6,193 | 1.14% | 136,137 | 1.58% |
| Valid Votes | 73,981 | N/A | 544,518 | N/A | 8,602,617 | N/A |

=== 1994 Sri Lankan Parliamentary Election ===
| Party | Bandaragama | | Kalutara Electoral District | | Sri Lanka | |
| Party | Votes | % | Votes | % | Votes | % |
|---|---|---|---|---|---|---|
| PA | 37,374 | 55.44% | 271,754 | 53.77% | 3,887,805 | 48.94% |
| UNP | 28,531 | 42.32% | 221,115 | 43.75% | 3,498,370 | 44.04% |
| SLPF | 774 | 1.15% | 6,238 | 1.23% | 90,078 | 1.13% |
| MEP | 707 | 1.05% | 5,914 | 1.17% | 68,538 | 0.86% |
| Other Parties (with < 1%) | 31 | 0.05% | 339 | 0.07% | 813 | 0.01% |
| Valid Votes | 67,417 | 95.66% | 505,360 | 95.21% | 7,943,688 | 95.20% |
| Rejected Votes | 3,059 | 4.34% | 25,397 | 4.79% | 400,395 | 4.80% |
| Total Polled | 70,476 | 81.31% | 530,757 | 80.20% | 8,344,095 | 74.75% |
| Registered Electors | 86,676 | | 661,793 | | 11,163,064 | |

=== 1989 Sri Lankan Parliamentary Election ===
| Party | Bandaragama | | Kalutara Electoral District | | Sri Lanka | |
| Party | Votes | % | Votes | % | Votes | % |
|---|---|---|---|---|---|---|
| UNP | 24,894 | 47.54% | 160,069 | 49.84% | 2,838,005 | 50.71% |
| SLFP | 23,202 | 44.31% | 131,510 | 40.94% | 1,785,369 | 31.90% |
| SLMC | 1,968 | 3.76% | 12,971 | 4.04% | 202,016 | 3.61% |
| USA | 1,764 | 3.37% | 12,342 | 3.84% | 141,983 | 2.54% |
| Other Parties (with < 1%) | 536 | 1.02% | 4,301 | 1.34% | 158,203 | 2.83% |
| Valid Votes | 52,364 | 95.36% | 321,193 | 94.10% | 5,596,468 | 93.87% |
| Rejected Votes | 2,550 | 4.64% | 20,139 | 5.90% | 365,563 | 6.13% |
| Total Polled | 54,914 | 75.98% | 341,332 | 59.86% | 5,962,031 | 63.60% |
| Registered Electors | 72,270 | | 570,193 | | 9,374,164 | |

== Demographics ==
=== Ethnicity ===
The Bandaragama Polling Division has a Sinhalese majority (91.0%) . In comparison, the Kalutara Electoral District (which contains the Bandaragama Polling Division) has a Sinhalese majority (86.8%)

Ethnicity in Bandaragama
1. Sinhalese (91.0%)
2. Moor (7.50%)
3. Other (1.50%)

=== Religion ===
The Bandaragama Polling Division has a Buddhist majority (89.1%) . In comparison, the Kalutara Electoral District (which contains the Bandaragama Polling Division) has a Buddhist majority (83.4%)

Religion in Bandaragama
1. Buddhist (89.1%)
2. Muslim (7.60%)
3. Other (1.70%)
4. Roman Catholic (1.60%)
