= Sanjeewa Ranasinghe =

Sri Lankan politician

Sanjeewa Ranasinghe is a Sri Lankan politician. He was elected to the Sri Lankan Parliament from Kalutara Electoral District as a member of the National People's Power.
