= Piyal Nishantha de Silva =

Sri Lankan politician (born 1970)

Hon. Piyal Nishantha MP
- පියල් නිශාන්ත பியால் நிஷாந்த

State Minister of Fisheries
- Incumbent
- Assumed office 12 August 2020

Member of Parliament for Kalutara District
- Incumbent
- Assumed office 2015

Personal details
- Born: Piyal Nishantha de Silva; 30 June 1970 (age 55)
- Citizenship: Sri Lankan
- Party: Sri Lanka Podujana Peramuna
- Other political affiliations: Sri Lanka People's Freedom Alliance; United People's Freedom Alliance
- Spouse: B.A.Ishara Udenika
- Children: 3 Children - Tharindu Nishan De Silva / Nadeesh Neminda De Silva / Kasun Harshana De Silva
- Occupation: Teacher

Piyal Nishantha de Silva (born 30 June 1970) is a Sri Lankan politician and MP representing the Sri Lanka Podujana Peramuna. He is the current State Minister of Fisheries

== Career ==
He contested at the 2015 parliamentary election representing the United People's Freedom Alliance from the Kalutara District and was elected to the 15th Parliament.

He also contested at the 2020 parliamentary election representing the Sri Lanka Podujana Peramuna and was elected to the 16th Parliament. On 12 August 2020, he was appointed as the State Minister of Women and Children's Development, Pre-School and Primary Education, and School Infrastructure and Education Services as a part of the second cabinet of the President Gotabaya Rajapaksa despite concerns were raised regarding the appointment of a male minister to handle and look after women affairs.

In January 2021, he was tested positive for COVID-19 after drinking a syrup which its creator claimed to be a herbal medicine given by Hindu goddess Kali.
