= Dhanushka Ranganath =

Sri Lankan politician

Dhanushka Ranganath is a Sri Lankan politician. He was elected to the Sri Lankan Parliament from Kalutara Electoral District as a member of the National People's Power.
