= Sanjeeva Edirimanna =

Sri Lankan politician

Hon. Sanjeeva Edirimanna MP
- සංජීව එදිරිමාන්න சஞ்சீவ எதிரிமன்னா

Kalutara District
- Incumbent
- Assumed office 2020

Personal details
- Citizenship: Sri Lanka
- Party: Sri Lanka Podujana Peramuna
- Other political affiliations: Sri Lanka People's Freedom Alliance
- Education: Sri Sumangala College Panadura and Thakshila Central college Horana, B.L.E.(U.O.C)
- Occupation: Politician

Arachchige Sanjeeva Edirimanna is a Sri Lankan politician and a member of the Sri Lankan parliament from Kalutara Electoral District as a member of the Sri Lanka Podujana Peramuna.
