= Lalith Ellawala =

Sri Lankan politician

Hon. Lalith Ellawala MP
- ලලිත් එල්ලාවල லலித் எல்லவாலா

Kalutara District
- Incumbent
- Assumed office 2020

Personal details
- Party: Sri Lanka Podujana Peramuna
- Other political affiliations: Sri Lanka People's Freedom Alliance

Lalith Ellawala is a Sri Lankan politician and a member of the Sri Lankan parliament from Kalutara Electoral District as a member of the Sri Lanka Podujana Peramuna.
