= Beruwala polling division =

Beruwala
- Polling Division
- Coordinates: 6.493972°N 79.999748°E
- Country: Sri Lanka
- Province: Western Province, Sri Lanka
- Electoral District: Kalutara Electoral District

Area
  - Total: 71.21 km^{2} (27.49 sq mi)

Population (2012)
  - Total: 164,969
  - Density: 2,317/km^{2} (6,000/sq mi)
- ISO 3166 code: EC-03G

The Beruwala polling division is a polling division in the Kalutara electoral district, in the Western Province, Sri Lanka.

== Presidential election results ==
=== Summary ===
The winner of Beruwala has matched the final country result 7 out of 8 times. Hence, Beruwala is a strong bellwether for presidential elections.

Year	Beruwala	Kalutara electoral district	MAE %	Sri Lanka	MAE %
2019	SLPP	SLPP	11.36%	SLPP	4.63%
2015	NDF	UPFA	10.40%	NDF	5.50%
2010	UPFA	UPFA	8.63%	UPFA	3.70%
2005	UPFA	UPFA	6.06%	UPFA	0.91%
1999	PA	PA	2.26%	PA	0.58%
1994	PA	PA	1.48%	PA	2.40%
1988	SLFP	SLFP	0.78%	UNP	4.19%
1982	UNP	UNP	2.18%	UNP	1.39%
Matches/Mean MAE	7/8	6/8	5.39%	8/8	2.91%

=== [2019 Sri Lankan presidential election ===
Party	Beruwala		Kalutara Electoral District		Sri Lanka	
Party	Votes	%	Votes	%	Votes	%
SLPP	48,037	47.58%	482,920	59.49%	6,924,255	52.25%
NDF	47,654	47.20%	284,213	35.01%	5,564,239	41.99%
NPP	3,172	3.14%	27,681	3.41%	418,553	3.16%
Other Parties (with < 1%)	2,091	2.07%	16,949	2.09%	345,452	2.61%
Valid Votes	100,954	99.13%	811,763	99.16%	13,252,499	98.99%
Rejected Votes	885	0.87%	6,847	0.84%	135,452	1.01%
Total Polled	101,839	83.69%	818,610	85.71%	13,387,951	83.71%
Registered Electors	121,686		955,080		15,992,568	

=== 2015 Sri Lankan presidential election ===
Party	Beruwala		Kalutara Electoral District		Sri Lanka	
Party	Votes	%	Votes	%	Votes	%
NDF	53,280	56.96%	349,404	46.46%	6,217,162	51.28%
UPFA	39,424	42.15%	395,890	52.65%	5,768,090	47.58%
Other Parties (with < 1%)	836	0.89%	6,690	0.89%	138,200	1.14%
Valid Votes	93,540	98.99%	751,984	98.90%	12,123,452	98.85%
Rejected Votes	951	1.01%	8,381	1.10%	140,925	1.15%
Total Polled	94,491	80.74%	760,365	82.08%	12,264,377	78.69%
Registered Electors	117,033		926,346		15,585,942	

=== 2010 Sri Lankan presidential election ===
Party	Beruwala		Kalutara Electoral District		Sri Lanka	
Party	Votes	%	Votes	%	Votes	%
UPFA	43,787	54.35%	412,562	63.06%	6,015,934	57.88%
NDF	35,678	44.29%	231,807	35.43%	4,173,185	40.15%
Other Parties (with < 1%)	1,093	1.36%	9,880	1.51%	204,494	1.97%
Valid Votes	80,558	99.35%	654,249	99.31%	10,393,613	99.03%
Rejected Votes	523	0.65%	4,541	0.69%	101,838	0.97%
Total Polled	81,081	77.69%	658,790	79.05%	10,495,451	66.70%
Registered Electors	104,363		833,360		15,734,587	

=== 2005 Sri Lankan presidential election ===
Party	Beruwala		Kalutara Electoral District		Sri Lanka	
Party	Votes	%	Votes	%	Votes	%
UPFA	37,402	49.31%	341,693	55.48%	4,887,152	50.29%
UNP	37,390	49.29%	266,043	43.20%	4,706,366	48.43%
Other Parties (with < 1%)	1,059	1.40%	8,124	1.32%	123,521	1.27%
Valid Votes	75,851	98.85%	615,860	98.95%	9,717,039	98.88%
Rejected Votes	885	1.15%	6,517	1.05%	109,869	1.12%
Total Polled	76,736	77.49%	622,377	79.67%	9,826,908	69.51%
Registered Electors	99,026		781,175		14,136,979	

=== 1999 Sri Lankan presidential election ===
Party	Beruwala		Kalutara Electoral District		Sri Lanka	
Party	Votes	%	Votes	%	Votes	%
PA	34,369	51.05%	281,217	52.88%	4,312,157	51.12%
UNP	29,585	43.95%	217,423	40.88%	3,602,748	42.71%
JVP	2,421	3.60%	23,770	4.47%	343,927	4.08%
Other Parties (with < 1%)	946	1.41%	9,399	1.77%	176,679	2.09%
Valid Votes	67,321	98.33%	531,809	97.83%	8,435,754	97.69%
Rejected Votes	1,145	1.67%	11,796	2.17%	199,536	2.31%
Total Polled	68,466	78.24%	543,605	78.23%	8,635,290	72.17%
Registered Electors	87,513		694,860		11,965,536	

=== 1994 Sri Lankan presidential election ===
Party	Beruwala		Kalutara Electoral District		Sri Lanka	
Party	Votes	%	Votes	%	Votes	%
PA	36,364	60.11%	295,686	61.47%	4,709,205	62.28%
UNP	23,487	38.82%	178,466	37.10%	2,715,283	35.91%
Other Parties (with < 1%)	649	1.07%	6,867	1.43%	137,040	1.81%
Valid Votes	60,500	98.92%	481,019	98.50%	7,561,526	98.03%
Rejected Votes	660	1.08%	7,309	1.50%	151,706	1.97%
Total Polled	61,160	72.94%	488,328	73.97%	7,713,232	69.12%
Registered Electors	83,849		660,191		11,158,880	

=== 1988 Sri Lankan presidential election ===
Party	Beruwala		Kalutara Electoral District		Sri Lanka	
Party	Votes	%	Votes	%	Votes	%
SLFP	21,920	50.51%	179,761	49.57%	2,289,857	44.95%
UNP	20,529	47.30%	169,510	46.74%	2,569,199	50.43%
SLMP	952	2.19%	13,375	3.69%	235,701	4.63%
Valid Votes	43,401	98.41%	362,646	98.23%	5,094,754	98.24%
Rejected Votes	700	1.59%	6,537	1.77%	91,499	1.76%
Total Polled	44,101	60.08%	369,183	64.20%	5,186,256	55.87%
Registered Electors	73,408		575,008		9,283,143	

=== 1982 Sri Lankan presidential election ===
Party	Beruwala		Kalutara Electoral District		Sri Lanka	
Party	Votes	%	Votes	%	Votes	%
UNP	27,951	52.94%	211,592	50.15%	3,450,815	52.93%
SLFP	22,349	42.33%	185,874	44.06%	2,546,348	39.05%
JVP	1,812	3.43%	14,499	3.44%	273,428	4.19%
LSSP	608	1.15%	8,613	2.04%	58,531	0.90%
Other Parties (with < 1%)	81	0.15%	1,314	0.31%	190,929	2.93%
Valid Votes	52,801	98.98%	421,892	98.76%	6,520,156	98.78%
Rejected Votes	544	1.02%	5,290	1.24%	80,470	1.22%
Total Polled	53,345	82.89%	427,182	83.97%	6,600,626	80.15%
Registered Electors	64,357		508,744		8,235,358	

== Parliamentary election results ==
=== Summary ===
The winner of the Beruwala has matched the final national result 7 out of 7 times. Hence, Beruwala serves as a preliminary bellwether for parliamentary elections.

Year	Beruwala	Kalutara Electoral District	MAE %	Sri Lanka	MAE %
2015	UNP	UPFA	9.90%	UNP	6.17%
2010	UPFA	UPFA	8.43%	UPFA	5.93%
2004	UPFA	UPFA	4.13%	UPFA	2.83%
2001	UNP	UNP	4.86%	UNP	3.28%
2000	PA	PA	2.75%	PA	1.83%
1994	PA	PA	1.39%	PA	2.15%
1989	UNP	UNP	3.58%	UNP	1.29%
Matches/Mean MAE	7/7	6/7	5.01%	7/7	3.35%

=== 2015 Sri Lankan parliamentary election ===
Party	Beruwala		Kalutara Electoral District		Sri Lanka	
Party	Votes	%	Votes	%	Votes	%
UNP	47,987	54.95%	310,234	44.48%	5,098,916	45.77%
UPFA	33,142	37.95%	338,801	48.58%	4,732,664	42.48%
JVP	3,670	4.20%	38,475	5.52%	544,154	4.88%
BJP	2,119	2.43%	5,727	0.82%	20,377	0.18%
Other Parties (with < 1%)	405	0.46%	4,224	0.61%	65,202	0.59%
Valid Votes	87,323	96.89%	697,461	97.00%	11,140,333	95.35%
Rejected Votes	2,782	3.09%	21,366	2.97%	516,926	4.42%
Total Polled	90,122	77.01%	719,001	80.13%	11,684,111	77.66%
Registered Electors	117,033		897,349		15,044,490	

=== 2010 Sri Lankan parliamentary election ===
Party	Beruwala		Kalutara Electoral District		Sri Lanka	
Party	Votes	%	Votes	%	Votes	%
UPFA	32,709	54.14%	313,836	63.74%	4,846,388	60.38%
UNP	21,737	35.98%	139,596	28.35%	2,357,057	29.37%
DNA	5,716	9.46%	36,722	7.46%	441,251	5.50%
Other Parties (with < 1%)	251	0.42%	2,246	0.46%	34,923	0.44%
Valid Votes	60,413	90.02%	492,400	90.41%	8,026,322	96.03%
Rejected Votes	6,644	9.90%	51,751	9.50%	581,465	6.96%
Total Polled	67,108	64.30%	544,606	65.21%	8,358,246	59.29%
Registered Electors	104,363		835,186		14,097,690	

=== 2004 Sri Lankan parliamentary election ===
Party	Beruwala		Kalutara Electoral District		Sri Lanka	
Party	Votes	%	Votes	%	Votes	%
UPFA	33,583	47.38%	291,208	51.72%	4,223,126	45.70%
UNP	30,210	42.62%	212,721	37.78%	3,486,792	37.73%
JHU	6,751	9.52%	56,615	10.06%	552,723	5.98%
Other Parties (with < 1%)	339	0.48%	2,475	0.44%	49,030	0.53%
Valid Votes	70,883	94.77%	563,019	94.82%	9,241,931	94.52%
Rejected Votes	3,912	5.23%	30,741	5.18%	534,452	5.47%
Total Polled	74,795	77.19%	593,760	79.58%	9,777,821	75.74%
Registered Electors	96,897		746,138		12,909,631	

=== 2001 Sri Lankan parliamentary election ===
Party	Beruwala		Kalutara Electoral District		Sri Lanka	
Party	Votes	%	Votes	%	Votes	%
UNP	36,709	52.12%	254,339	45.94%	4,086,026	45.62%
PA	25,641	36.41%	226,468	40.91%	3,330,815	37.19%
JVP	6,581	9.34%	60,451	10.92%	815,353	9.10%
Other Parties (with < 1%)	1,499	2.13%	12,361	2.23%	137,091	1.53%
Valid Votes	70,430	94.75%	553,619	94.44%	8,955,844	94.77%
Rejected Votes	3,903	5.25%	32,617	5.56%	494,009	5.23%
Total Polled	74,333	80.22%	586,236	81.68%	9,449,878	76.03%
Registered Electors	92,658		717,764		12,428,762	

=== 2000 Sri Lankan parliamentary election ===
Party	Beruwala		Kalutara Electoral District		Sri Lanka	
Party	Votes	%	Votes	%	Votes	%
PA	30,179	43.40%	255,175	46.86%	3,899,329	45.33%
UNP	29,392	42.27%	217,215	39.89%	3,451,765	40.12%
JVP	3,988	5.74%	38,373	7.05%	518,725	6.03%
NUA	3,671	5.28%	11,943	2.19%	185,593	2.16%
SU	1,565	2.25%	15,619	2.87%	127,859	1.49%
Other Parties (with < 1%)	738	1.06%	6,193	1.14%	136,137	1.58%
Valid Votes	69,533	N/A	544,518	N/A	8,602,617	N/A

=== 1994 Sri Lankan parliamentary election ===
Party	Beruwala		Kalutara Electoral District		Sri Lanka	
Party	Votes	%	Votes	%	Votes	%
PA	33,686	52.33%	271,754	53.77%	3,887,805	48.94%
UNP	29,063	45.15%	221,115	43.75%	3,498,370	44.04%
SLPF	809	1.26%	6,238	1.23%	90,078	1.13%
MEP	776	1.21%	5,914	1.17%	68,538	0.86%
Other Parties (with < 1%)	42	0.07%	339	0.07%	813	0.01%
Valid Votes	64,376	95.82%	505,360	95.21%	7,943,688	95.20%
Rejected Votes	2,805	4.18%	25,397	4.79%	400,395	4.80%
Total Polled	67,181	80.12%	530,757	80.20%	8,344,095	74.75%
Registered Electors	83,849		661,793		11,163,064	

=== 1989 Sri Lankan parliamentary election ===
Party	Beruwala		Kalutara Electoral District		Sri Lanka	
Party	Votes	%	Votes	%	Votes	%
UNP	19,298	50.12%	160,069	49.84%	2,838,005	50.71%
SLFP	12,976	33.70%	131,510	40.94%	1,785,369	31.90%
SLMC	5,250	13.64%	12,971	4.04%	202,016	3.61%
USA	642	1.67%	12,342	3.84%	141,983	2.54%
Other Parties (with < 1%)	336	0.87%	4,301	1.34%	158,203	2.83%
Valid Votes	38,502	94.56%	321,193	94.10%	5,596,468	93.87%
Rejected Votes	2,214	5.44%	20,139	5.90%	365,563	6.13%
Total Polled	40,716	56.27%	341,332	59.86%	5,962,031	63.60%
Registered Electors	72,355		570,193		9,374,164	

== Demographics ==
=== Ethnicity ===
The Beruwala polling division has a Sinhalese majority (64.2%) and a significant Moor population (34.6%) . In comparison, the Kalutara electoral district (which contains the Beruwala polling division) has a Sinhalese majority (86.8%).

Ethnicity in Beruwala
1. Sinhalese (64.2%)
2. Moor (34.6%)
3. Other (1.20%)

=== Religion ===
The Beruwala polling division has a Buddhist majority (55.7%) and a significant Muslim population (34.7%) . In comparison, the Kalutara Electoral District (which contains the Beruwala polling division) has a Buddhist majority (83.4%).

Religion in Beruwala
1. Buddhist (55.7%)
2. Muslim (34.7%)
3. Roman Catholic (8.40%)
4. Other (1.10%)
