= Mathugama Polling Division =

Mathugama
- Polling Division
- Coordinates: 6.525455°N 80.062823°E
- Country: Sri Lanka
- Province: Western Province, Sri Lanka
- Electoral District: Kalutara Electoral District

Area
  - Total: 257.13 km^{2} (99.28 sq mi)

Population (2012)
  - Total: 145,246
  - Density: 565/km^{2} (1,460/sq mi)
- ISO 3166 code: EC-03E

The Mathugama Polling Division is a Polling Division in the Kalutara Electoral District, in the Western Province, Sri Lanka.

== Presidential Election Results ==
=== Summary ===
The winner of Mathugama has matched the final country result 6 out of 8 times. Hence, Mathugama is a Weak Bellwether for Presidential Elections.

Year	Mathugama	Kalutara Electoral District	MAE %	Sri Lanka	MAE %
2019	SLPP	SLPP	0.92%	SLPP	7.64%
2015	UPFA	UPFA	1.17%	NDF	6.06%
2010	UPFA	UPFA	0.67%	UPFA	5.58%
2005	UPFA	UPFA	0.20%	UPFA	5.36%
1999	PA	PA	0.80%	PA	0.97%
1994	PA	PA	0.38%	PA	1.31%
1988	SLFP	SLFP	1.20%	UNP	5.12%
1982	UNP	UNP	1.67%	UNP	5.07%
Matches/Mean MAE	6/8	6/8	0.88%	8/8	4.64%

=== 2019 Sri Lankan Presidential Election ===
Party	Mathugama		Kalutara Electoral District		Sri Lanka	
Party	Votes	%	Votes	%	Votes	%
SLPP	55,932	60.42%	482,920	59.49%	6,924,255	52.25%
NDF	31,451	33.98%	284,213	35.01%	5,564,239	41.99%
NMPP	3,028	3.27%	27,681	3.41%	418,553	3.16%
Other Parties (with < 1%)	2,155	2.33%	16,949	2.09%	345,452	2.61%
Valid Votes	92,566	99.16%	811,763	99.16%	13,252,499	98.99%
Rejected Votes	786	0.84%	6,847	0.84%	135,452	1.01%
Total Polled	93,352	85.02%	818,610	85.71%	13,387,951	83.71%
Registered Electors	109,804		955,080		15,992,568	

=== 2015 Sri Lankan Presidential Election ===
Party	Mathugama		Kalutara Electoral District		Sri Lanka	
Party	Votes	%	Votes	%	Votes	%
UPFA	45,984	53.72%	395,890	52.65%	5,768,090	47.58%
NDF	38,668	45.17%	349,404	46.46%	6,217,162	51.28%
Other Parties (with < 1%)	945	1.10%	6,690	0.89%	138,200	1.14%
Valid Votes	85,597	98.77%	751,984	98.90%	12,123,452	98.85%
Rejected Votes	1,063	1.23%	8,381	1.10%	140,925	1.15%
Total Polled	86,660	79.51%	760,365	82.08%	12,264,377	78.69%
Registered Electors	108,996		926,346		15,585,942	

=== 2010 Sri Lankan Presidential Election ===
Party	Mathugama		Kalutara Electoral District		Sri Lanka	
Party	Votes	%	Votes	%	Votes	%
UPFA	47,988	63.58%	412,562	63.06%	6,015,934	57.88%
NDF	26,016	34.47%	231,807	35.43%	4,173,185	40.15%
Other Parties (with < 1%)	1,478	1.96%	9,880	1.51%	204,494	1.97%
Valid Votes	75,482	99.26%	654,249	99.31%	10,393,613	99.03%
Rejected Votes	564	0.74%	4,541	0.69%	101,838	0.97%
Total Polled	76,046	76.25%	658,790	79.05%	10,495,451	66.70%
Registered Electors	99,737		833,360		15,734,587	

=== 2005 Sri Lankan Presidential Election ===
Party	Mathugama		Kalutara Electoral District		Sri Lanka	
Party	Votes	%	Votes	%	Votes	%
UPFA	40,006	55.58%	341,693	55.48%	4,887,152	50.29%
UNP	30,853	42.86%	266,043	43.20%	4,706,366	48.43%
Other Parties (with < 1%)	1,123	1.56%	8,124	1.32%	123,521	1.27%
Valid Votes	71,982	98.96%	615,860	98.95%	9,717,039	98.88%
Rejected Votes	756	1.04%	6,517	1.05%	109,869	1.12%
Total Polled	72,738	77.81%	622,377	79.67%	9,826,908	69.51%
Registered Electors	93,479		781,175		14,136,979	

=== 1999 Sri Lankan Presidential Election ===
Party	Mathugama		Kalutara Electoral District		Sri Lanka	
Party	Votes	%	Votes	%	Votes	%
PA	32,352	51.71%	281,217	52.88%	4,312,157	51.12%
UNP	25,813	41.26%	217,423	40.88%	3,602,748	42.71%
JVP	3,221	5.15%	23,770	4.47%	343,927	4.08%
Other Parties (with < 1%)	1,179	1.88%	9,399	1.77%	176,679	2.09%
Valid Votes	62,565	97.67%	531,809	97.83%	8,435,754	97.69%
Rejected Votes	1,492	2.33%	11,796	2.17%	199,536	2.31%
Total Polled	64,057	75.74%	543,605	78.23%	8,635,290	72.17%
Registered Electors	84,575		694,860		11,965,536	

=== 1994 Sri Lankan Presidential Election ===
Party	Mathugama		Kalutara Electoral District		Sri Lanka	
Party	Votes	%	Votes	%	Votes	%
PA	33,726	61.04%	295,686	61.47%	4,709,205	62.28%
UNP	20,667	37.41%	178,466	37.10%	2,715,283	35.91%
Other Parties (with < 1%)	857	1.55%	6,867	1.43%	137,040	1.81%
Valid Votes	55,250	98.14%	481,019	98.50%	7,561,526	98.03%
Rejected Votes	1,045	1.86%	7,309	1.50%	151,706	1.97%
Total Polled	56,295	70.25%	488,328	73.97%	7,713,232	69.12%
Registered Electors	80,135		660,191		11,158,880	

=== 1988 Sri Lankan Presidential Election ===
Party	Mathugama		Kalutara Electoral District		Sri Lanka	
Party	Votes	%	Votes	%	Votes	%
SLFP	19,908	51.49%	179,761	49.57%	2,289,857	44.95%
UNP	17,917	46.34%	169,510	46.74%	2,569,199	50.43%
SLMP	836	2.16%	13,375	3.69%	235,701	4.63%
Valid Votes	38,661	98.18%	362,646	98.23%	5,094,754	98.24%
Rejected Votes	716	1.82%	6,537	1.77%	91,499	1.76%
Total Polled	39,377	55.89%	369,183	64.20%	5,186,256	55.87%
Registered Electors	70,457		575,008		9,283,143	

=== 1982 Sri Lankan Presidential Election ===
Party	Mathugama		Kalutara Electoral District		Sri Lanka	
Party	Votes	%	Votes	%	Votes	%
UNP	24,494	48.46%	211,592	50.15%	3,450,815	52.93%
SLFP	23,154	45.81%	185,874	44.06%	2,546,348	39.05%
JVP	2,164	4.28%	14,499	3.44%	273,428	4.19%
LSSP	537	1.06%	8,613	2.04%	58,531	0.90%
Other Parties (with < 1%)	196	0.39%	1,314	0.31%	190,929	2.93%
Valid Votes	50,545	98.56%	421,892	98.76%	6,520,156	98.78%
Rejected Votes	741	1.44%	5,290	1.24%	80,470	1.22%
Total Polled	51,286	82.97%	427,182	83.97%	6,600,626	80.15%
Registered Electors	61,809		508,744		8,235,358	

== Parliamentary Election Results ==
=== Summary ===
The winner of Mathugama has matched the final country result 6 out of 7 times. Hence, Mathugama is often used as a Bellwether for Parliamentary Elections.

Year	Mathugama	Kalutara Electoral District	MAE %	Sri Lanka	MAE %
2015	UPFA	UPFA	0.25%	UNP	2.98%
2010	UPFA	UPFA	0.90%	UPFA	2.32%
2004	UPFA	UPFA	2.02%	UPFA	4.29%
2001	UNP	UNP	0.58%	UNP	1.36%
2000	PA	PA	0.49%	PA	1.15%
1994	PA	PA	1.60%	PA	1.98%
1989	UNP	UNP	2.10%	UNP	4.42%
Matches/Mean MAE	6/7	6/7	1.13%	7/7	2.64%

=== 2015 Sri Lankan Parliamentary Election ===
Party	Mathugama		Kalutara Electoral District		Sri Lanka	
Party	Votes	%	Votes	%	Votes	%
UPFA	38,114	48.30%	338,801	48.58%	4,732,664	42.48%
UNP	35,267	44.70%	310,234	44.48%	5,098,916	45.77%
JVP	4,087	5.18%	38,475	5.52%	544,154	4.88%
BJP	953	1.21%	5,727	0.82%	20,377	0.18%
Other Parties (with < 1%)	484	0.61%	4,224	0.61%	65,202	0.59%
Valid Votes	78,905	96.34%	697,461	97.00%	11,140,333	95.35%
Rejected Votes	2,978	3.64%	21,366	2.97%	516,926	4.42%
Total Polled	81,905	75.14%	719,001	80.13%	11,684,111	77.66%
Registered Electors	108,996		897,349		15,044,490	

=== 2010 Sri Lankan Parliamentary Election ===
Party	Mathugama		Kalutara Electoral District		Sri Lanka	
Party	Votes	%	Votes	%	Votes	%
UPFA	35,920	63.59%	313,836	63.74%	4,846,388	60.38%
UNP	17,295	30.62%	139,596	28.35%	2,357,057	29.37%
DNA	2,990	5.29%	36,722	7.46%	441,251	5.50%
Other Parties (with < 1%)	279	0.49%	2,246	0.46%	34,923	0.44%
Valid Votes	56,484	89.52%	492,400	90.41%	8,026,322	96.03%
Rejected Votes	6,566	10.41%	51,751	9.50%	581,465	6.96%
Total Polled	63,100	63.27%	544,606	65.21%	8,358,246	59.29%
Registered Electors	99,737		835,186		14,097,690	

=== 2004 Sri Lankan Parliamentary Election ===
Party	Mathugama		Kalutara Electoral District		Sri Lanka	
Party	Votes	%	Votes	%	Votes	%
UPFA	36,294	54.97%	291,208	51.72%	4,223,126	45.70%
UNP	24,912	37.73%	212,721	37.78%	3,486,792	37.73%
JHU	4,542	6.88%	56,615	10.06%	552,723	5.98%
Other Parties (with < 1%)	282	0.43%	2,475	0.44%	49,030	0.53%
Valid Votes	66,030	94.29%	563,019	94.82%	9,241,931	94.52%
Rejected Votes	4,000	5.71%	30,741	5.18%	534,452	5.47%
Total Polled	70,030	77.02%	593,760	79.58%	9,777,821	75.74%
Registered Electors	90,919		746,138		12,909,631	

=== 2001 Sri Lankan Parliamentary Election ===
Party	Mathugama		Kalutara Electoral District		Sri Lanka	
Party	Votes	%	Votes	%	Votes	%
UNP	29,290	45.63%	254,339	45.94%	4,086,026	45.62%
PA	25,761	40.13%	226,468	40.91%	3,330,815	37.19%
JVP	7,697	11.99%	60,451	10.92%	815,353	9.10%
Other Parties (with < 1%)	1,438	2.24%	12,361	2.23%	137,091	1.53%
Valid Votes	64,186	93.49%	553,619	94.44%	8,955,844	94.77%
Rejected Votes	4,472	6.51%	32,617	5.56%	494,009	5.23%
Total Polled	68,658	77.86%	586,236	81.68%	9,449,878	76.03%
Registered Electors	88,182		717,764		12,428,762	

=== 2000 Sri Lankan Parliamentary Election ===
Party	Mathugama		Kalutara Electoral District		Sri Lanka	
Party	Votes	%	Votes	%	Votes	%
PA	29,968	47.38%	255,175	46.86%	3,899,329	45.33%
UNP	25,518	40.34%	217,215	39.89%	3,451,765	40.12%
JVP	4,709	7.44%	38,373	7.05%	518,725	6.03%
SU	1,648	2.61%	15,619	2.87%	127,859	1.49%
Other Parties (with < 1%)	1,412	2.23%	18,136	3.33%	321,730	3.74%
Valid Votes	63,255	N/A	544,518	N/A	8,602,617	N/A

=== 1994 Sri Lankan Parliamentary Election ===
Party	Mathugama		Kalutara Electoral District		Sri Lanka	
Party	Votes	%	Votes	%	Votes	%
PA	30,514	51.96%	271,754	53.77%	3,887,805	48.94%
UNP	26,520	45.16%	221,115	43.75%	3,498,370	44.04%
SLPF	969	1.65%	6,238	1.23%	90,078	1.13%
MEP	670	1.14%	5,914	1.17%	68,538	0.86%
Other Parties (with < 1%)	54	0.09%	339	0.07%	813	0.01%
Valid Votes	58,727	93.57%	505,360	95.21%	7,943,688	95.20%
Rejected Votes	4,034	6.43%	25,397	4.79%	400,395	4.80%
Total Polled	62,761	78.32%	530,757	80.20%	8,344,095	74.75%
Registered Electors	80,135		661,793		11,163,064	

=== 1989 Sri Lankan Parliamentary Election ===
Party	Mathugama		Kalutara Electoral District		Sri Lanka	
Party	Votes	%	Votes	%	Votes	%
UNP	13,643	50.40%	160,069	49.84%	2,838,005	50.71%
SLFP	12,156	44.91%	131,510	40.94%	1,785,369	31.90%
SLMC	436	1.61%	12,971	4.04%	202,016	3.61%
USA	414	1.53%	12,342	3.84%	141,983	2.54%
ELJP	312	1.15%	1,611	0.50%	67,723	1.21%
Other Parties (with < 1%)	108	0.40%	2,690	0.84%	90,480	1.62%
Valid Votes	27,069	91.17%	321,193	94.10%	5,596,468	93.87%
Rejected Votes	2,621	8.83%	20,139	5.90%	365,563	6.13%
Total Polled	29,690	43.06%	341,332	59.86%	5,962,031	63.60%
Registered Electors	68,955		570,193		9,374,164	

== Demographics ==
=== Ethnicity ===
The Mathugama Polling Division has a Sinhalese majority (88.0%) . In comparison, the Kalutara Electoral District (which contains the Mathugama Polling Division) has a Sinhalese majority (86.8%)

Ethnicity in Mathugama
1. Sinhalese (88.0%)
2. Sri Lankan Tamil (6.00%)
3. Indian Tamil (3.80%)
4. Moor (2.00%)
5. Other (0.10%)

=== Religion ===
The Mathugama Polling Division has a Buddhist majority (87.1%) . In comparison, the Kalutara Electoral District (which contains the Mathugama Polling Division) has a Buddhist majority (83.4%)

Religion in Mathugama
1. Buddhist (87.1%)
2. Hindu (8.80%)
3. Muslim (2.10%)
4. Roman Catholic (1.30%)
5. Other (0.80%)
