= Kalutara Polling Division =

Kalutara
- Polling Division
- Coordinates: 6.617818°N 79.967553°E
- Country: Sri Lanka
- Province: Western Province, Sri Lanka
- Electoral District: Kalutara Electoral District

Area
  - Total: 80.72 km^{2} (31.17 sq mi)

Population (2012)
  - Total: 159,697
  - Density: 1,978/km^{2} (5,120/sq mi)
- ISO 3166 code: EC-03F

The Kalutara Polling Division is a Polling Division in the Kalutara Electoral District, in the Western Province, Sri Lanka.

== Presidential Election Results ==
=== Summary ===
The winner in Kalutara has matched the national result in 7 of the 8 presidential elections, making it a bellwether for presidential elections.

Year	Kalutara	Kalutara Electoral District	MAE %	Sri Lanka	MAE %
2019	SLPP	SLPP	0.54%	SLPP	7.30%
2015	UPFA	UPFA	0.93%	NDF	3.94%
2010	UPFA	UPFA	0.61%	UPFA	4.28%
2005	UPFA	UPFA	1.60%	UPFA	6.73%
1999	PA	PA	0.37%	PA	2.07%
1994	PA	PA	0.45%	PA	0.48%
1988	UNP	SLFP	1.58%	UNP	2.54%
1982	UNP	UNP	1.01%	UNP	3.72%
Matches/Mean MAE	7/8	6/8	0.89%	8/8	3.88%

=== 2019 Sri Lankan Presidential Election ===
Party	Kalutara		Kalutara Electoral District		Sri Lanka	
Party	Votes	%	Votes	%	Votes	%
SLPP	59,796	59.82%	482,920	59.49%	6,924,255	52.25%
NDF	34,076	34.09%	284,213	35.01%	5,564,239	41.99%
NMPP	4,034	4.04%	27,681	3.41%	418,553	3.16%
Other Parties (with < 1%)	2,059	2.06%	16,949	2.09%	345,452	2.61%
Valid Votes	99,965	99.14%	811,763	99.16%	13,252,499	98.99%
Rejected Votes	870	0.86%	6,847	0.84%	135,452	1.01%
Total Polled	100,835	84.36%	818,610	85.71%	13,387,951	83.71%
Registered Electors	119,526		955,080		15,992,568	

=== 2015 Sri Lankan Presidential Election ===
Party	Kalutara		Kalutara Electoral District		Sri Lanka	
Party	Votes	%	Votes	%	Votes	%
UPFA	48,851	51.78%	395,890	52.65%	5,768,090	47.58%
NDF	44,804	47.49%	349,404	46.46%	6,217,162	51.28%
Other Parties (with < 1%)	687	0.73%	6,690	0.89%	138,200	1.14%
Valid Votes	94,342	99.05%	751,984	98.90%	12,123,452	98.85%
Rejected Votes	905	0.95%	8,381	1.10%	140,925	1.15%
Total Polled	95,247	80.77%	760,365	82.08%	12,264,377	78.69%
Registered Electors	117,931		926,346		15,585,942	

=== 2010 Sri Lankan Presidential Election ===
Party	Kalutara		Kalutara Electoral District		Sri Lanka	
Party	Votes	%	Votes	%	Votes	%
UPFA	51,330	62.53%	412,562	63.06%	6,015,934	57.88%
NDF	29,719	36.21%	231,807	35.43%	4,173,185	40.15%
Other Parties (with < 1%)	1,036	1.26%	9,880	1.51%	204,494	1.97%
Valid Votes	82,085	99.30%	654,249	99.31%	10,393,613	99.03%
Rejected Votes	581	0.70%	4,541	0.69%	101,838	0.97%
Total Polled	82,666	77.35%	658,790	79.05%	10,495,451	66.70%
Registered Electors	106,878		833,360		15,734,587	

=== 2005 Sri Lankan Presidential Election ===
Party	Kalutara		Kalutara Electoral District		Sri Lanka	
Party	Votes	%	Votes	%	Votes	%
UPFA	45,143	57.19%	341,693	55.48%	4,887,152	50.29%
UNP	32,916	41.70%	266,043	43.20%	4,706,366	48.43%
Other Parties (with < 1%)	871	1.10%	8,124	1.32%	123,521	1.27%
Valid Votes	78,930	98.99%	615,860	98.95%	9,717,039	98.88%
Rejected Votes	808	1.01%	6,517	1.05%	109,869	1.12%
Total Polled	79,738	78.16%	622,377	79.67%	9,826,908	69.51%
Registered Electors	102,020		781,175		14,136,979	

=== 1999 Sri Lankan Presidential Election ===
Party	Kalutara		Kalutara Electoral District		Sri Lanka	
Party	Votes	%	Votes	%	Votes	%
PA	35,751	53.03%	281,217	52.88%	4,312,157	51.12%
UNP	27,131	40.25%	217,423	40.88%	3,602,748	42.71%
JVP	3,369	5.00%	23,770	4.47%	343,927	4.08%
Other Parties (with < 1%)	1,162	1.72%	9,399	1.77%	176,679	2.09%
Valid Votes	67,413	97.77%	531,809	97.83%	8,435,754	97.69%
Rejected Votes	1,540	2.23%	11,796	2.17%	199,536	2.31%
Total Polled	68,953	76.00%	543,605	78.23%	8,635,290	72.17%
Registered Electors	90,723		694,860		11,965,536	

=== 1994 Sri Lankan Presidential Election ===
Party	Kalutara		Kalutara Electoral District		Sri Lanka	
Party	Votes	%	Votes	%	Votes	%
PA	37,490	61.97%	295,686	61.47%	4,709,205	62.28%
UNP	22,209	36.71%	178,466	37.10%	2,715,283	35.91%
Other Parties (with < 1%)	794	1.31%	6,867	1.43%	137,040	1.81%
Valid Votes	60,493	98.49%	481,019	98.50%	7,561,526	98.03%
Rejected Votes	929	1.51%	7,309	1.50%	151,706	1.97%
Total Polled	61,422	71.06%	488,328	73.97%	7,713,232	69.12%
Registered Electors	86,437		660,191		11,158,880	

=== 1988 Sri Lankan Presidential Election ===
Party	Kalutara		Kalutara Electoral District		Sri Lanka	
Party	Votes	%	Votes	%	Votes	%
UNP	22,551	47.44%	169,510	46.74%	2,569,199	50.43%
SLFP	22,425	47.18%	179,761	49.57%	2,289,857	44.95%
SLMP	2,559	5.38%	13,375	3.69%	235,701	4.63%
Valid Votes	47,535	97.62%	362,646	98.23%	5,094,754	98.24%
Rejected Votes	1,161	2.38%	6,537	1.77%	91,499	1.76%
Total Polled	48,696	64.15%	369,183	64.20%	5,186,256	55.87%
Registered Electors	75,912		575,008		9,283,143	

=== 1982 Sri Lankan Presidential Election ===
Party	Kalutara		Kalutara Electoral District		Sri Lanka	
Party	Votes	%	Votes	%	Votes	%
UNP	26,167	49.07%	211,592	50.15%	3,450,815	52.93%
SLFP	22,992	43.12%	185,874	44.06%	2,546,348	39.05%
JVP	2,306	4.32%	14,499	3.44%	273,428	4.19%
LSSP	1,707	3.20%	8,613	2.04%	58,531	0.90%
Other Parties (with < 1%)	151	0.28%	1,314	0.31%	190,929	2.93%
Valid Votes	53,323	98.87%	421,892	98.76%	6,520,156	98.78%
Rejected Votes	612	1.13%	5,290	1.24%	80,470	1.22%
Total Polled	53,935	83.05%	427,182	83.97%	6,600,626	80.15%
Registered Electors	64,944		508,744		8,235,358	

== Parliamentary Election Results ==
=== Summary ===
The winner of Kalutara has matched the final country result 6 out of 7 times, making Kalutara a strong Bellwether for Parliamentary Elections.

Year	Kalutara	Kalutara Electoral District	MAE %	Sri Lanka	MAE %
2015	UPFA	UPFA	1.29%	UNP	2.14%
2010	UPFA	UPFA	0.92%	UPFA	2.18%
2004	UPFA	UPFA	0.99%	UPFA	3.89%
2001	UNP	UNP	0.74%	UNP	1.56%
2000	PA	PA	1.30%	PA	0.90%
1994	PA	PA	0.36%	PA	2.84%
1989	UNP	UNP	3.13%	UNP	4.11%
Matches/Mean MAE	6/7	6/7	1.25%	7/7	2.52%

=== 2015 Sri Lankan Parliamentary Election ===
Party	Kalutara		Kalutara Electoral District		Sri Lanka	
Party	Votes	%	Votes	%	Votes	%
UPFA	40,837	46.78%	338,801	48.58%	4,732,664	42.48%
UNP	39,525	45.28%	310,234	44.48%	5,098,916	45.77%
JVP	5,775	6.62%	38,475	5.52%	544,154	4.88%
Other Parties (with < 1%)	1,153	1.32%	9,951	1.43%	85,579	0.77%
Valid Votes	87,290	97.28%	697,461	97.00%	11,140,333	95.35%
Rejected Votes	2,425	2.70%	21,366	2.97%	516,926	4.42%
Total Polled	89,730	76.09%	719,001	80.13%	11,684,111	77.66%
Registered Electors	117,931		897,349		15,044,490	

=== 2010 Sri Lankan Parliamentary Election ===
Party	Kalutara		Kalutara Electoral District		Sri Lanka	
Party	Votes	%	Votes	%	Votes	%
UPFA	38,300	62.81%	313,836	63.74%	4,846,388	60.38%
UNP	16,838	27.61%	139,596	28.35%	2,357,057	29.37%
DNA	5,584	9.16%	36,722	7.46%	441,251	5.50%
Other Parties (with < 1%)	253	0.41%	2,246	0.46%	34,923	0.44%
Valid Votes	60,975	90.91%	492,400	90.41%	8,026,322	96.03%
Rejected Votes	6,056	9.03%	51,751	9.50%	581,465	6.96%
Total Polled	67,070	62.75%	544,606	65.21%	8,358,246	59.29%
Registered Electors	106,878		835,186		14,097,690	

=== 2004 Sri Lankan Parliamentary Election ===
Party	Kalutara		Kalutara Electoral District		Sri Lanka	
Party	Votes	%	Votes	%	Votes	%
UPFA	37,958	52.10%	291,208	51.72%	4,223,126	45.70%
UNP	26,255	36.04%	212,721	37.78%	3,486,792	37.73%
JHU	8,324	11.43%	56,615	10.06%	552,723	5.98%
Other Parties (with < 1%)	317	0.44%	2,475	0.44%	49,030	0.53%
Valid Votes	72,854	95.08%	563,019	94.82%	9,241,931	94.52%
Rejected Votes	3,766	4.92%	30,741	5.18%	534,452	5.47%
Total Polled	76,620	76.67%	593,760	79.58%	9,777,821	75.74%
Registered Electors	99,940		746,138		12,909,631	

=== 2001 Sri Lankan Parliamentary Election ===
Party	Kalutara		Kalutara Electoral District		Sri Lanka	
Party	Votes	%	Votes	%	Votes	%
UNP	32,344	45.30%	254,339	45.94%	4,086,026	45.62%
PA	28,693	40.18%	226,468	40.91%	3,330,815	37.19%
JVP	8,768	12.28%	60,451	10.92%	815,353	9.10%
Other Parties (with < 1%)	864	1.21%	7,258	1.31%	86,426	0.97%
SU	736	1.03%	5,103	0.92%	50,665	0.57%
Valid Votes	71,405	94.81%	553,619	94.44%	8,955,844	94.77%
Rejected Votes	3,911	5.19%	32,617	5.56%	494,009	5.23%
Total Polled	75,316	78.70%	586,236	81.68%	9,449,878	76.03%
Registered Electors	95,698		717,764		12,428,762	

=== 2000 Sri Lankan Parliamentary Election ===
Party	Kalutara		Kalutara Electoral District		Sri Lanka	
Party	Votes	%	Votes	%	Votes	%
PA	31,469	45.50%	255,175	46.86%	3,899,329	45.33%
UNP	26,641	38.52%	217,215	39.89%	3,451,765	40.12%
JVP	5,516	7.97%	38,373	7.05%	518,725	6.03%
NUA	2,464	3.56%	11,943	2.19%	185,593	2.16%
SU	2,428	3.51%	15,619	2.87%	127,859	1.49%
Other Parties (with < 1%)	651	0.94%	6,193	1.14%	136,137	1.58%
Valid Votes	69,169	N/A	544,518	N/A	8,602,617	N/A

=== 1994 Sri Lankan Parliamentary Election ===
Party	Kalutara		Kalutara Electoral District		Sri Lanka	
Party	Votes	%	Votes	%	Votes	%
PA	34,349	53.93%	271,754	53.77%	3,887,805	48.94%
UNP	27,482	43.15%	221,115	43.75%	3,498,370	44.04%
SLPF	1,107	1.74%	6,238	1.23%	90,078	1.13%
MEP	727	1.14%	5,914	1.17%	68,538	0.86%
Other Parties (with < 1%)	27	0.04%	339	0.07%	813	0.01%
Valid Votes	63,692	95.46%	505,360	95.21%	7,943,688	95.20%
Rejected Votes	3,029	4.54%	25,397	4.79%	400,395	4.80%
Total Polled	66,721	77.19%	530,757	80.20%	8,344,095	74.75%
Registered Electors	86,437		661,793		11,163,064	

=== 1989 Sri Lankan Parliamentary Election ===
Party	Kalutara		Kalutara Electoral District		Sri Lanka	
Party	Votes	%	Votes	%	Votes	%
UNP	17,840	46.77%	160,069	49.84%	2,838,005	50.71%
SLFP	14,374	37.69%	131,510	40.94%	1,785,369	31.90%
USA	3,311	8.68%	12,342	3.84%	141,983	2.54%
SLMC	2,248	5.89%	12,971	4.04%	202,016	3.61%
Other Parties (with < 1%)	369	0.97%	4,301	1.34%	158,203	2.83%
Valid Votes	38,142	94.06%	321,193	94.10%	5,596,468	93.87%
Rejected Votes	2,407	5.94%	20,139	5.90%	365,563	6.13%
Total Polled	40,549	54.82%	341,332	59.86%	5,962,031	63.60%
Registered Electors	73,971		570,193		9,374,164	

== Demographics ==
=== Ethnicity ===
The Kalutara Polling Division has a Sinhalese majority (90.7%) . In comparison, the Kalutara Electoral District (which contains the Kalutara Polling Division) has a Sinhalese majority (86.8%)

Ethnicity in Kalutara
1. Sinhalese (90.7%)
2. Moor (7.80%)
3. Sri Lankan Tamil (1.10%)
4. Other (0.40%)

=== Religion ===
The Kalutara Polling Division has a Buddhist majority (84.5%) . In comparison, the Kalutara Electoral District (which contains the Kalutara Polling Division) has a Buddhist majority (83.4%)

Religion in Kalutara
1. Buddhist (84.5%)
2. Muslim (7.80%)
3. Roman Catholic (6.10%)
4. Other (1.50%)
