= Oshani Umanga =

Member of Parliament of Sri Lanka

Hon. Oshani Umanga Hapuarachchi MP
- ඔෂානි උමංගා හපුආරච්චි ஒஷானி உமங்கா ஹப்புஆராச்சி

Member of Parliament for Kalutara District
- Incumbent
- Assumed office 21 November 2024
- Majority: 69,232 Preferential votes

Personal details
- Party: National People's Power
- Occupation: Businesswoman

Oshani Umanga Hapuarachchi is a Sri Lankan politician and a member of the Parliament of Sri Lanka from Kalutara Electoral District since 2024 as a member of the National People's Power.

== Electoral history ==
Electoral history of
Election	Constituency	Party	Votes	Result	Ref
2024 parliamentary	Kalutara District	National People's Power	69,232	Elected	
