= Nandana Padmakumara =

Sri Lankan politician

Nandana Padmakumara is a Sri Lankan politician. He was elected to the Sri Lankan Parliament from Kalutara Electoral District as a member of the National People's Power.
