= Anupa Pasqual =

Sri Lankan politician

Hon. Anupa Pasqual
- අනුප පැස්කුවල් அனுப பாஸ்குவல்

Member of Parliament for Kalutara District
- In office 20 August 2020 – 24 September 2024

Personal details
- Born: Anupa Pium Pasqual; 17 June 1964 (age 62) Matugama, Ceylon (now in Sri Lanka)
- Party: Sri Lanka Podujana Peramuna
- Other political affiliations: Sri Lanka People's Freedom Alliance
- Education: University of Colombo

Anupa Pium Pasqual (born 17 June 1964) is a Sri Lankan politician and former Member of Parliament.

Born in the town of Matugama, Pasqual was educated at Ananda Sastralaya, Matugama and later Royal College, Colombo. He possesses a degree in science from the University of Colombo and was a senior environmental officer at the Central Environmental Authority of Sri Lanka. He is a member of Viyathmaga, a nationalist pro-Rajapaksa group of academics, businesspeople and professionals.

Pasqual contested the 2020 parliamentary election as a candidate of the Sri Lanka People's Freedom Alliance for the Kalutara District and was elected to the Parliament of Sri Lanka.

Electoral history of Anupa Pasqual
Election	Constituency	Party	Alliance	Votes	Result
2020 parliamentary	Kalutara District	Sri Lanka Podujana Peramuna	Sri Lanka People's Freedom Alliance	97,777	Elected
