= Jayantha Samaraweera =

Sri Lankan politician

Hon. Jayantha Samaraweera MP
- ජයන්ත සමරවීර ஜயந்த சமரவீர

Member of Parliament for Kalutara District
- In office 1 September 2015 – 24 September 2024
- In office 2004–2010

Personal details
- Born: 20 December 1968 (age 57)
- Party: National Freedom Front
- Other political affiliations: Supreme Lanka Coalition (since 2022); Sri Lanka People's Freedom Alliance (2019–2022); United People's Freedom Alliance (2004–2019)

Jayantha Samaraweera (born 20 December 1968) is a Sri Lankan politician and former member of the Parliament of Sri Lanka.
