= Chandima Hettiaratchi =

Sri Lankan politician

Hon. Chandima Hettiaratchi MP
- චන්දිම හෙට්ටිආරච්චි

Member of Parliament for Kalutara District
- Incumbent
- Assumed office 21 November 2024

Personal details
- Born: 22 October 1983 (age 42)
- Party: National People's Power
- Education: Nalanda College, Colombo
- Alma mater: Open University of Sri Lanka, University of Sri Jayewardenepura
- Occupation: Politician

Chandima Hettiaratchi (born 22 October 1983) is a Sri Lankan politician. He was elected to the Sri Lankan Parliament from Kalutara Electoral District as a member of the National People's Power. Chandima was educated at Nalanda College, Colombo.
