= Pujitha Vithana =

Sri Lankan admiral

Pujitha Vithana is a Sri Lankan admiral and incumbent 7th Director General of the Sri Lanka Coast Guard. Prior to that, he served as Deputy Director General of the Sri Lanka Coast Guard (SLCG). He also served as Director Naval Administration at Navy Headquarters.

== Early life ==
Vithana studied at S. Thomas' College, Bandarawela. He joined the Sri Lanka Navy as an Officer Cadet in 1988 for the 18th Intake in the executive branch of the Sri Lanka Navy.

== Career ==
He was commissioned as a Sub Lieutenant in 1990. Then he completed his Sub Lieutenant Technical Course at the Naval and Maritime Academy in 1991 and has specialized Torpedo and Anti-Submarine from Underwater Warfare School, PNS Bahadur, Karachi, Pakistan. He was Deputy Area Commander Eastern Naval Area of Sri Lanka. Vithana promoted to the rank of Rear Admiral on 9 July 2022.

== Personal life ==
Pujitha is married to Mrs Rasika. The couple has two children.
