= Nirmala Kothalawala =

Sri Lankan politician

Hon. Nirmala Kothalawala MP

Member of Parliament for Kalutara

Personal details
- Born: Nirmala Wijerathne Kothalawala; 29 September 1965 (age 61) Kalutara, Sri Lanka
- Party: Sri Lanka Freedom Party
- Other political affiliations: United People's Freedom Alliance
- Education: Nalanda College Colombo
- Occupation: Politics

Nirmala Kotalawala MP (born 29 September 1965) was Sri Lanka's Deputy Minister of Highways and a Member of Parliament representing the Kalutara Electoral District.

He was a student at Nalanda College Colombo. In 1997 he was elected Chairman of the Pradeshiya Saba Dodangoda, a position for which he held for two years. Kotalawala was also a member of the Western Provincial Council between 1999 and 2004.
