= Bahujana Nidahas Peramuna =

People's Freedom Front Bahujana Nidahas Peramuna
- Founder: Chandrika Kumaratunga
- Founded: 1991
- Split from: Sri Lanka Mahajana Pakshaya

Bahujana Nidahas Peramuna (People's Freedom Front/Mass Freedom Front) is a political party in Sri Lanka founded by Chandrika Kumaratunga when she broke away from the Sri Lanka Mahajana Pakshaya, the party of her late husband. Kumaratunga returned to the Sri Lanka Freedom Party in 1993; however, the BNP continued to live on as a separate political party.

In the 1999 presidential elections, the BNP nominated A. W. Premawardhana as their candidate.
