= Jagath Vithana =

Sri Lankan politician

Jagath Vithana is a Sri Lankan politician. He was elected to the Sri Lankan Parliament from Kalutara Electoral District as a member of the Samagi Jana Balawegaya.
