= Nilanthi Kottahachchi =

Sri Lankan politician

Hon. Nilanthi Kottahachchi MP
- නිලන්ති කොට්ටහච්චි நிலாந்தி கொட்டஹாச்சி

Member of Parliament for Kalutara District
- Incumbent
- Assumed office 21 November 2024
- Majority: 131,375 Preferential votes

Personal details
- Born: 21 August 1989 (age 37)
- Party: National People's Power
- Education: University of Colombo
- Occupation: Politician
- Profession: Attorney-at-law

Nilanthi Kottahachchi (born 21 August 1989) is a Sri Lankan politician and a member of the Parliament of Sri Lanka from Kalutara Electoral District since 2024 as a member of the National People's Power.

Kottahachchi graduated from the Faculty of Law, University of Colombo and qualified as an Attorney-at-law, joining the Panadura Unofficial Bar.

Entering politics in 2023 from the National People's Power, she gained notability during the 2024 Sri Lankan parliamentary election when she claimed assets stolen by the Rajapaksa administration had been stashed in Uganda at a campaign rally. Kottahachchi later stated that this was false, and she knew it at the time she made this allegation.

In January 2025, following a complaint by Kottahachchi to the Criminal Investigation Department, Raveendra Rammuni a former Millaniya Pradeshiya Sabha member of the opposition Sri Lanka Podujana Peramuna was arrested by the secret police and later granted bail by the Colombo Magistrate's Court. Kottahachchi's lawyer had claimed that Rammuni had spread false information on social media, alleging that she had visited a hotel with him for money. The lawyer had asked the secret police to take action for Kottahachchi is a woman, a wife, and a mother of young children.

== Electoral history ==
Electoral history of
Election	Constituency	Party	Votes	Result	Ref
2024 parliamentary	Kalutara District	National People's Power	131,375	Elected	
