= Lakshman Wijemanna =

Sri Lankan politician

Ananda Lakshman Wijemanna (born 19 June 1960) is a Sri Lankan politician and a member of the Parliament of Sri Lanka. He represents Kalutara District and he is the district leader and organiser of United National Party.
