= Baduraliya =

- Town
- Location within Sri Lanka
- Coordinates: 6°31′00″N 80°13′56″E
- Country: Sri Lanka
- Province: Western Province
- District: Kalutara District
- Time zone: UTC+5:30 (Sri Lanka Standard Time Zone)
- Postal Code: 12230

Baduraliya (Sinhala: බදුරලිය) is a town in the Kalutara District in Sri Lanka. It is approximately 82 km (51 mi) from Colombo and 58 km (36 mi) from Rathnapura. Baduraliya was named after a rally against taxes. "Badu" in Sinhala means taxes and “raliya” means a rally. Baduraliya is surrounded by tea plantations and rubber estates, and it is at an altitude of 27 m (89 ft) above sea level.

Baduraliya is the capital of Palinda Nuwara (Sinhala: පාලින්ද නුවර) secretariat Division in boarder of the Pasdun Korale. The name ‘Palinda Nuwara’ originated because of prince Veediya Bandara and his wife fled into Pelenda, a village 6.5 km away from Baduraliya. Prince Veediya Bandara was the commander-in-chief of the Kotte kingdom, during the reign of Bhuvanaikabahu VII of Kotte (1521–1551). Prince Veediya Bandara led the battles against Portuguese and King Mayadunne of Sitawaka with the army stationed in Palinda Nuwara.

As of 2019, the total registered population in this secretariat division was 56,586. The area of the division is 276.0 km². The population density in 2012 was 184.1/km². The annual population change from 2001 to 2012 was 0.95%.

== Economy ==
The main economic activities in this area are the cultivation of tea and rubber. The town's agricultural industry is well developed. Few rubber and tea factories can be seen in the region. Tea grown in this region is called low-country tea. The area is known for rice, coconut, vegetable and fruit cultivations as well. About 50% people out of total population in this area are working on the agricultural sector.

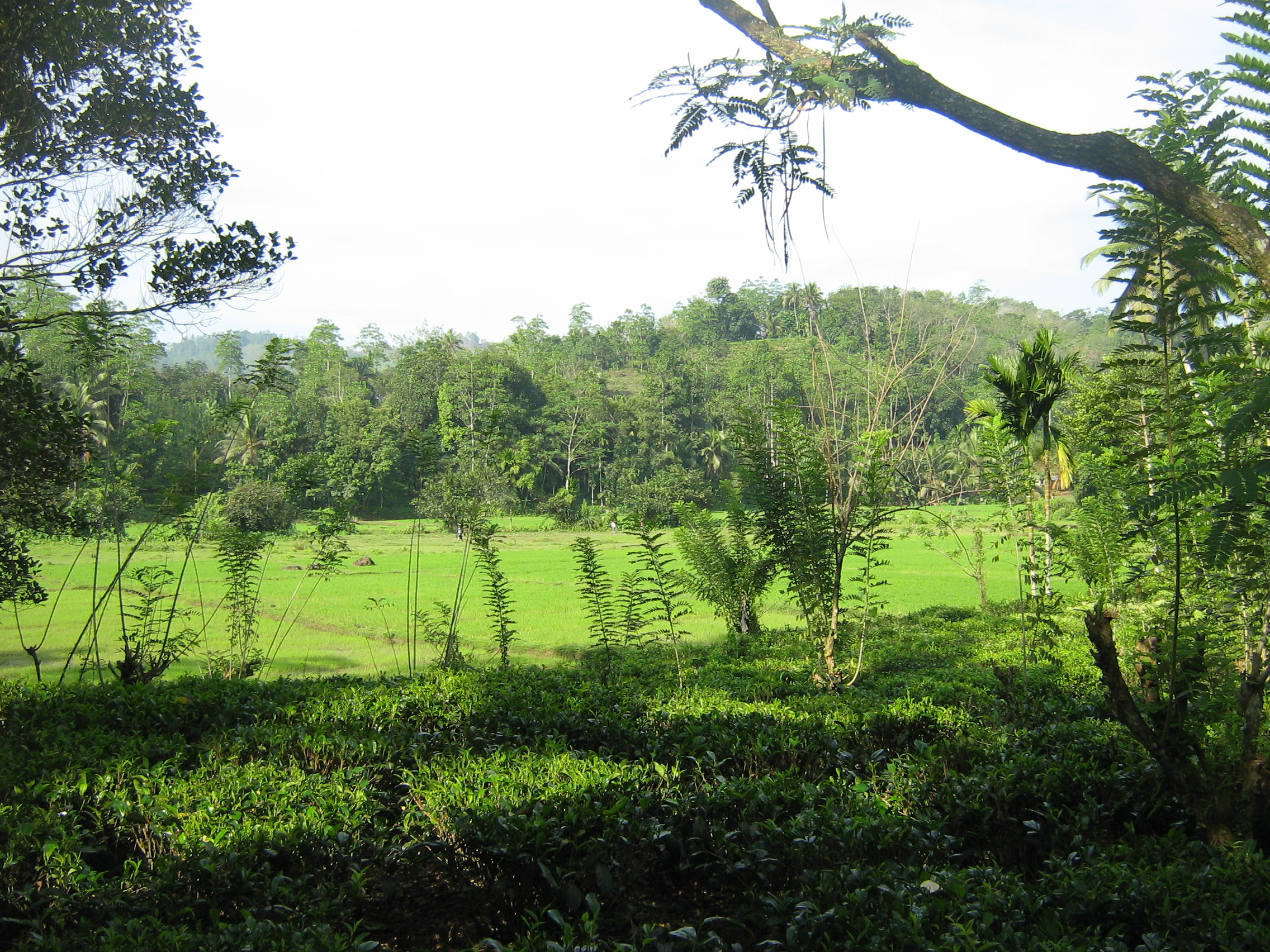
Cultivations in Baduraliya

The town centre includes commerce, retail enterprises, and many government offices. Buduraliya host to a government hospital, a police station, and few bank branches. The town is usually busy on Sundays because hundreds of people in nearby villages gather for Sunday fair.

The Kukule Ganga Hydroelectric Power Plant, which has the rated output of 70 MW, is located in this area. It is about 10 km (6.2 mi) away from Baduraliya town centre on the Lathpandura - Molkawa (B584) road. In 2006, the power plant supplied about 4.0% of the total amount of electricity supplied in Sri Lanka at peak hours, and about 3.4% of the amount of electricity supplied per annum. The resort facility with a restaurant and a pool, which was originally built as a camp for European and American contractors of Kukule Ganga Hydroelectric Power Plant, has the capacity to accommodate about 200 guests with 64 guest rooms. It attracts many domestic tourists and the rooms are nearly full during weekends and school vacations through the year. About 60 local residents are employed by the resort facility.

Baduraliya is a popular holiday destination with its natural streams and pools for bathing.

== Transport ==
Baduraliya is located in B 421 Highway which connects Agalawatte and Thiriwanakatiya. Baduraliya is easily accessible via the Southern Expressway (Sri Lanka). The town is about 26 km (16 mi) eastward to the Dodangoda Interchange. It is also accessible via Horana, Palawattha or Kalawana.

Buses are one form of public transportation modes in Baduraliya. A considerable number of school students commute for Matugama, where the so-called popular schools can be found. Some workers commute for Colombo spending more than two hours in one-way trip using buses.

== Climate ==
Baduraliya has a tropical rainforest climate under the Köppen climate classification. The town receives rainfall mainly from south-western monsoons from May to September. During the remaining months of the year, there is also considerable precipitation due to convective rains. Average temperature range from 22 to 33 °C year round, and there are high humidity levels. The town is in the south-western part of Sri Lanka, the so-called wet zone.
