= Sri Palee College =

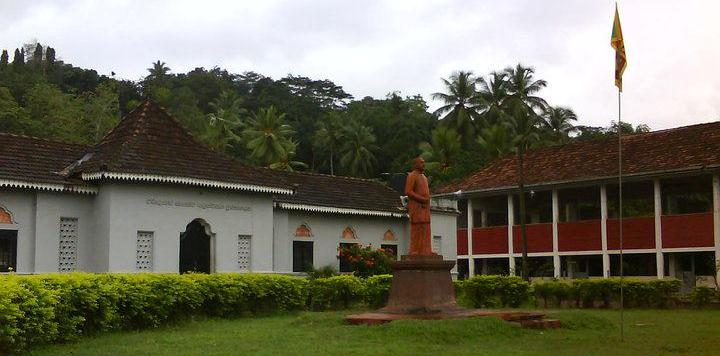
- Type: Public school
- Established: 1934
- Principal: Anusha Damayanthi
- Students: over 5,000
- Location: Horana, Sri Lanka; 6°42′27″N 80°04′07″E
- Colors: Maroon and gold
- Website: www.sripaleecollege.lk

Sri Palee College in Horana is one of the main mixed schools in Sri Lanka. The number of students are over 5,000. There are classes from grade 1 to 13.

== History ==
Inspired by Guru Dev Rabindranath Tagore an Indian writer, artist and educationist, and his university at Shanthi Niketan later called Visva Bharathi University, Wilmot Abraham Perera, a revolutionary educationist and a politician of Sri Lanka, decided to establish a similar institution in Ceylon, and invited Gurudev Tagore to lay the foundation stone for the institution, which Tagore named Sri Palee (place where the goddess of fine arts lives). This was laid on 20 May 1934, in Horana.

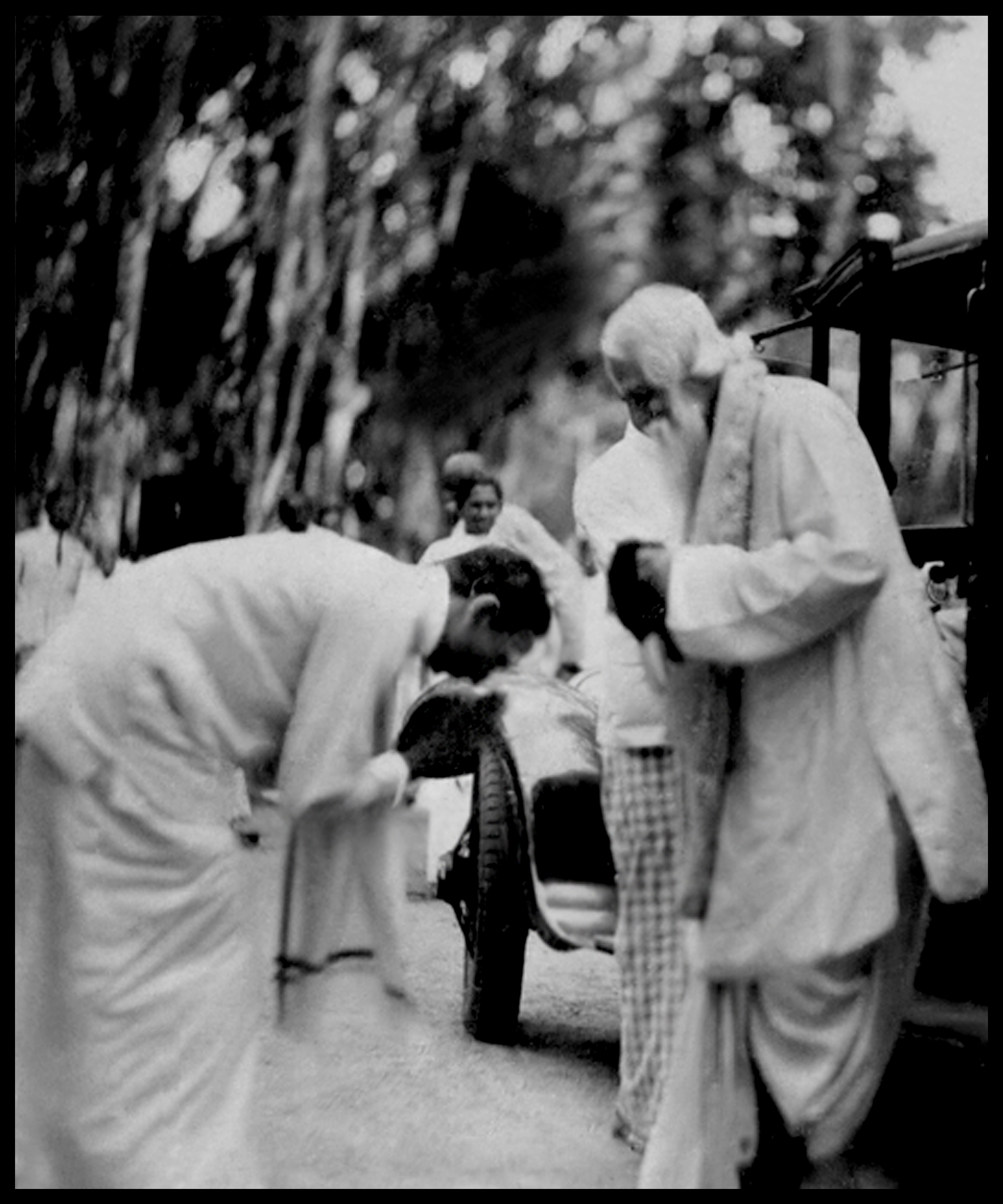
Wilmot A. Perera greeting Rabindranath Tagore when he arrived to lay the foundation stone to Sri Palee, on 20 May 1934.

At present, the principal, 140 academic staff and 20 non-academic staff operate at the college. The education medium is Sinhala and English medium is being introduced. English is taught as secondary language in all classes. Sri Palee is like any other government school in the island and subjects are taught according to the government curriculum. Science, mathematics and commerce streams are available at secondary educational level.

== College founder ==
The founder of Sri Palee College, Wilmot Abraham Perera, was a proprietor planter. His father, Abraham Perera, was known as the King of Rubber in Raigam and Pasdun Counties and was the richest person in the area due to the income he received from his rubber plantations. Perera was born on 12 June 1905, educated at Cyril Jansze College at Panadura and later at Royal College Colombo. He thought of studying archaeology, but after his father's demise he was compelled to look after his properties and became a planter. He became a successful planter and married Esme Perera Abeywardena, a lady from a wealthy family in Galle, and a grand daughter of Sir Charles Henry de Soysa.

As a planter he had to mingle with labourers in estates and the people of the area. He could see the grievances of poor people and their struggle to live. He truly felt sorry for these people and made surveys to discover the reasons for their hardships. As a result of this effort he wrote the book Problems of Rural Ceylon. To find solutions for those problems he established for the first time a rural development society in Raigam Korale. He also believed in free education for the sons and daughters of the poor. To make all his ideas a reality he established Sri Palee College at Horana in Sri Lanka, based on the model of Shanthi Niketan in West Bengal, India. He was the first to start giving a midday meal to the pupils.

As a leftist, Perera was involved in the "Suriyamal" movement during the World War II period and later became a Member of Parliament for the Matugama electorate at the 1st general election in 1947. He won the same electorate in 1952 as well. In 1957 he became the first Sri Lankan ambassador to China. He was the chairman of the Wilmot A. Perera Salaries commission. He died in 1973.

== Upasanaya/Assembly ==
This is a tradition of the college. Students come for the assembly which is held in an open area with a small stage surrounded by large trees called Upasana Maluwa [assembly ground]. After the assembly pupils walk as Upasana Perahara [assembly procession] through the path around the Upasana Maluwa. In this Perahera four pupils walk in a row, singing the school anthem. At the end of the Upasana Perahera, students stop above the Upasana Maluwa, in front of the Nimaline Hall (school office) and sing the national anthem. After the national anthem they go to their classes.

== Annual big match ==
Sri Palee College Horana plays its annual Big Match with C. W. W. Kannangara College, Mathugama.

== See also ==
- Sri Palee Campus
