= Dayasena Pasqual =

Ceylonese politician (1912–2013)

Hon. Dayasena Pasqual

Member of the Ceylon Parliament for Matugama
- In office 1956–1977
- Preceded by: Wilmot A. Perera
- Succeeded by: Reginald V. Wijegunaratne

Personal details
- Born: Dayasena Turnolius Pasqual; 9 June 1912 Uragoda, Ceylon
- Died: 22 May 2013 (aged 100) Matugama, Sri Lanka
- Party: Sri Lanka Freedom Party
- Education: National School, Matugama; Ananda Sastralaya, Kotte; Ananda College, Colombo
- Occupation: teacher, educational administrator, politician

Dayasena Turnolius Pasqual (9 June 1912 - 22 May 2013) was a Ceylonese politician. He represented the Matugama electorate in Parliament for 21 consecutive years from 1956 to 1977.

Pasqual was born in Uragoda (a small remote village), the eldest of thirteen children. He attended Ananda Sastralaya, Kotte, and Ananda College, Colombo

Once he graduated from high school he went on to teach at Ananda Shastralaya He founded Ananda Sastralaya, Matugama in February 1942.

In 1943 he was elected to the Horawala - Dodango - Matugama Village Council and subsequently its chairman in 1944.

Pasqual ran as the Sri Lanka Freedom Party candidate in the Matugama electorate, at the 3rd parliamentary election held between 5 April 1956 and 10 April 1956. He polled the second highest margin at the election, receiving 25,798 votes (70.7% of the total vote), 19,609 votes ahead of the United National Party candidate, A. C. Gooneratne.

In 1957 he was appointed the General Manager of the B.T.S. Schools, a position he held for a year until 1958.

In September 1959 he was appointed Parliamentary Secretary to the Minister of Finance in the Dahanayake cabinet, until March 1960. He was re-elected at the 4th parliamentary election, held on 19 March 1960, polling 7,099 votes (28.6% of the total vote). At the subsequent 5th parliamentary election, held on 20 July 1960, he retained his seat, receiving 14,790 votes (61.8% of the total votes).

Following the election he was appointed the Deputy Minister of Local Government and Housing in the First Sirimavo Bandaranaike cabinet, serving from July 1960 until March 1965. At the 6th parliamentary election, held on 22 March 1965, he was re-elected, polling 18,122 votes (56.2% of the total vote).

At the 7th parliamentary election held on 27 May 1970, he was re-elected, receiving 24,718 votes (63.7% of the total vote) and 10,720 votes ahead of his nearest rival. In 1975 he was appointed Deputy Minister of Justice in the Second Sirimavo Bandaranaike cabinet.

In July 1977, at the 8th parliamentary election, he was unable to retain the seat for a sixth term, as he was defeated by the United National Party candidate, Reginald V. Wijegunaratne. Wijegunaratne receiving 25,484 votes (55.1% of the total vote) to Pasqual's 10,497 votes (22.7% of the total vote).

The Matugama electoral district was replaced by the Kalutara multi-member electoral district at the 1989 general elections, and Pasqual at the age of 77 chose not to run.

In September 2010 he received the Neela Udara Award from President Mahinda Rajapaksa. Pasqual died 22 May 2013, at the age of 100.
