= Climate of Mumbai =

The climate of Mumbai is tropical, with defined wet and dry seasons (Köppen: Aw/Am). The mean annual temperature is 27.7 °C or 81.9 °F. Average annual rainfall is 2,213.4 millimetres or 87 inches in Colaba, which represents South Mumbai, and 2,502.3 millimetres or 99 inches in Santacruz, which represents central and suburban Mumbai. The mean maximum average temperatures is about 32 °C (90 °F) in summer and 30 °C (86 °F) in winter, while the average minimums are 26 °C (79 °F) in summer and 18 °C (64 °F) in winter. The city experiences a lengthy, practically rainless dry season, and a relatively short, but extremely rainy wet season; due to the Southwest Monsoon and orographic influences from the nearby Western Ghats. These conditions effectively place Mumbai between a tropical monsoon climate (Am) and a tropical savannah climate (Aw), with more tilt towards the former considering annual precipitation.

== Climate data ==
Climate data for Mumbai (Colaba) 1991–2020 normals, extremes 1901–present
Month	Jan	Feb	Mar	Apr	May	Jun	Jul	Aug	Sep	Oct	Nov	Dec	Year
Record high °C (°F)	37.1 (98.8)	38.3 (100.9)	41.6 (106.9)	40.6 (105.1)	39.7 (103.5)	37.2 (99.0)	35.6 (96.1)	33.8 (92.8)	35.6 (96.1)	39.5 (103.1)	38.4 (101.1)	36.7 (98.1)	41.6 (106.9)
Mean maximum °C (°F)	34.4 (93.9)	34.9 (94.8)	35.8 (96.4)	35.1 (95.2)	35.4 (95.7)	35.0 (95.0)	32.1 (89.8)	31.7 (89.1)	32.7 (90.9)	36.4 (97.5)	36.3 (97.3)	35.3 (95.5)	37.6 (99.7)
Mean daily maximum °C (°F)	30.2 (86.4)	30.3 (86.5)	31.7 (89.1)	32.9 (91.2)	34.0 (93.2)	32.2 (90.0)	29.9 (85.8)	29.9 (85.8)	30.6 (87.1)	33.1 (91.6)	33.8 (92.8)	32.2 (90.0)	31.7 (89.1)
Daily mean °C (°F)	24.9 (76.8)	25.5 (77.9)	27.3 (81.1)	29.2 (84.6)	30.7 (87.3)	29.3 (84.7)	27.7 (81.9)	27.5 (81.5)	27.9 (82.2)	29.1 (84.4)	28.7 (83.7)	26.7 (80.1)	27.9 (82.2)
Mean daily minimum °C (°F)	19.4 (66.9)	20.4 (68.7)	23.0 (73.4)	25.3 (77.5)	27.3 (81.1)	26.6 (79.9)	25.5 (77.9)	25.2 (77.4)	25.1 (77.2)	25.1 (77.2)	23.6 (74.5)	21.2 (70.2)	24 (75)
Mean minimum °C (°F)	16.0 (60.8)	17.1 (62.8)	20.0 (68.0)	22.9 (73.2)	25.0 (77.0)	23.3 (73.9)	23.3 (73.9)	23.3 (73.9)	23.1 (73.6)	22.8 (73.0)	20.7 (69.3)	17.7 (63.9)	15.6 (60.1)
Record low °C (°F)	11.7 (53.1)	11.7 (53.1)	16.3 (61.3)	20.0 (68.0)	22.8 (73.0)	21.1 (70.0)	21.7 (71.1)	20.7 (69.3)	20.0 (68.0)	20.6 (69.1)	17.8 (64.0)	12.8 (55.0)	11.7 (53.1)
Average rainfall mm (inches)	0.6 (0.02)	0.4 (0.02)	0.7 (0.03)	0.2 (0.01)	15.9 (0.63)	506.0 (19.92)	768.5 (30.26)	471.9 (18.58)	355.6 (14.00)	81.7 (3.22)	8.5 (0.33)	3.4 (0.13)	2,213.4 (87.14)
Average rainy days	0.1	0.1	0.1	0.0	0.6	14.1	22.1	20.2	14.0	3.6	0.5	0.3	75.6
Average relative humidity (%) (at 17:30 IST)	62	62	63	66	68	77	85	84	80	72	65	63	71
Average dew point °C (°F)	15 (59)	16 (61)	19 (66)	22 (72)	24 (75)	25 (77)	25 (77)	24 (75)	24 (75)	22 (72)	19 (66)	16 (61)	21 (70)
Mean monthly sunshine hours	282.1	271.2	282.1	279.0	272.8	138.0	80.6	77.5	147.0	238.7	267.0	275.9	2,611.9
Mean daily sunshine hours	9.1	9.6	9.1	9.3	8.8	4.6	2.6	2.5	4.9	7.7	8.9	8.9	7.2
Average ultraviolet index	8	10	12	12	12	12	12	12	12	10	8	7	11
Source 1: India Meteorological Department (sun 1971–2000) Time and Date (dewpoints, 1985–2015)
Source 2: Tokyo Climate Center (mean temperatures 1991–2020), Weather Atlas

Climate data for Mumbai (Chhatrapati Shivaji Maharaj International Airport, located in Santacruz) 1991–2020, extremes 1951–2012)
Month	Jan	Feb	Mar	Apr	May	Jun	Jul	Aug	Sep	Oct	Nov	Dec	Year
Record high °C (°F)	37.4 (99.3)	39.6 (103.3)	41.7 (107.1)	42.2 (108.0)	41.0 (105.8)	39.8 (103.6)	36.2 (97.2)	33.5 (92.3)	37.0 (98.6)	38.6 (101.5)	37.6 (99.7)	39.8 (103.6)	42.2 (108.0)
Mean daily maximum °C (°F)	31.2 (88.2)	31.7 (89.1)	32.7 (90.9)	33.3 (91.9)	34.3 (93.7)	34.8 (94.6)	29.4 (84.9)	29.0 (84.2)	30.9 (87.6)	34.9 (94.8)	34.5 (94.1)	32.3 (90.1)	32.4 (90.3)
Mean daily minimum °C (°F)	19.8 (67.6)	23.2 (73.8)	23.4 (74.1)	25.6 (78.1)	29.3 (84.7)	29.5 (85.1)	27.7 (81.9)	27.3 (81.1)	27.1 (80.8)	27.7 (81.9)	26.2 (79.2)	24.0 (75.2)	24 (75)
Record low °C (°F)	7.4 (45.3)	8.5 (47.3)	12.7 (54.9)	16.9 (62.4)	20.2 (68.4)	19.8 (67.6)	21.2 (70.2)	19.4 (66.9)	20.7 (69.3)	16.7 (62.1)	13.3 (55.9)	10.6 (51.1)	7.4 (45.3)
Average rainfall mm (inches)	0.2 (0.01)	0.2 (0.01)	0.1 (0.00)	0.1 (0.00)	7.3 (0.29)	526.3 (20.72)	919.9 (36.22)	560.8 (22.08)	383.5 (15.10)	91.3 (3.59)	11.0 (0.43)	1.6 (0.06)	2,502.3 (98.52)
Average rainy days	0.0	0.0	0.1	0.0	0.7	14.0	23.3	21.4	14.4	3.9	0.6	0.2	78.6
Average relative humidity (%) (at 17:30 IST)	49	47	51	59	65	74	81	81	76	63	56	51	63
Source: India Meteorological Department

=== Sea temperature ===
Mumbai sea temperature
Jan	Feb	Mar	Apr	May	Jun	Jul	Aug	Sep	Oct	Nov	Dec
27 °C (81 °F)	25 °C (77 °F)	26 °C (79 °F)	27 °C (81 °F)	29 °C (84 °F)	29 °C (84 °F)	30 °C (86 °F)	28 °C (82 °F)	28 °C (82 °F)	29 °C (84 °F)	28 °C (82 °F)	26 °C (79 °F)

== Monthly breakdown of climate ==
The following is the monthly breakdown of the weather in Mumbai.

=== January ===
January is the coolest month of the year for Mumbai, with the mean daily minimum being 16.4 °C and the mean daily maximum being 30.1 °C. The nightly lows may vary between 13 °C and 20 °C. Chilly northern winds during the day make the city seem cooler than it is. Generally, clear skies, with some smog – especially in the early morning – are the norm. The days are dry, and the nights relatively humid. January is also associated with the deciduous trees in the city shedding their leaves. On 26–27 January 2008, recorded a minimum temperature of 10.2 °C, which is the lowest recorded in 45 years. The lowest recorded temperature is 7.4 °C (45.3 °F) on 22 January 1962, which was the coldest day in Mumbai. Coastal areas are relatively cooler during the day, but they are warmer at night.

=== February ===
The fine January weather continues for the first fortnight of February. The mean daily minimum stays at 17.3 °C and the mean daily maximum is 31.3 °C with some possibility of unseasonable showers. Smog increases. 6 February 2008 recorded a minimum temperature of 9.4 °C. Just two days later, on 8 February, the minimum temperature recorded was 8.5 °C, which was the lowest temperature Mumbai had seen since January 1962.

=== March ===
The month of March sees a mean minimum temp of 20.6 °C and a mean maximum temp of 32.7 °C. During the transition from dry to humid weather in mid-March, the temperature might hit 38 to 40 °C. This high, however, is due to hot dry winds from Gujarat. By mid-March the temperatures may hit 37 °C, with the lows at 24 °C. Humidity is unbearable, and smog affects the city. New leaves sprout from deciduous trees. The all-time high day temperature for March was recorded in 2018 at 41.7 °C.

=== April ===
The temperatures and humidity are still high. However, the cooling effect of the sea breezes makes its presence felt. The high temperature stays around 35.1 °C and daily lows are around 23.2 °C. Plants are in full bloom in April.

=== May ===
May is the hottest month of the year for Mumbai with the cool sea breezes providing some relief. The daily maximum hovers around 34.5 °C and the daily low is 29.1 °C.

=== June ===
June marks the beginning of the monsoon period in Mumbai. The beginning of the month is characterized by a continuation of the summer with increased humidity. The official date for the monsoon to hit the city is 10 June. This period is marked by thunderstorms and often windy conditions as the monsoon establishes itself over the city. Rainfall activity intensifies as the month goes on, leading into the wettest month, July. The max and min mean daily temperatures are measured at 34.5 °C/26.6 °C.

=== July ===
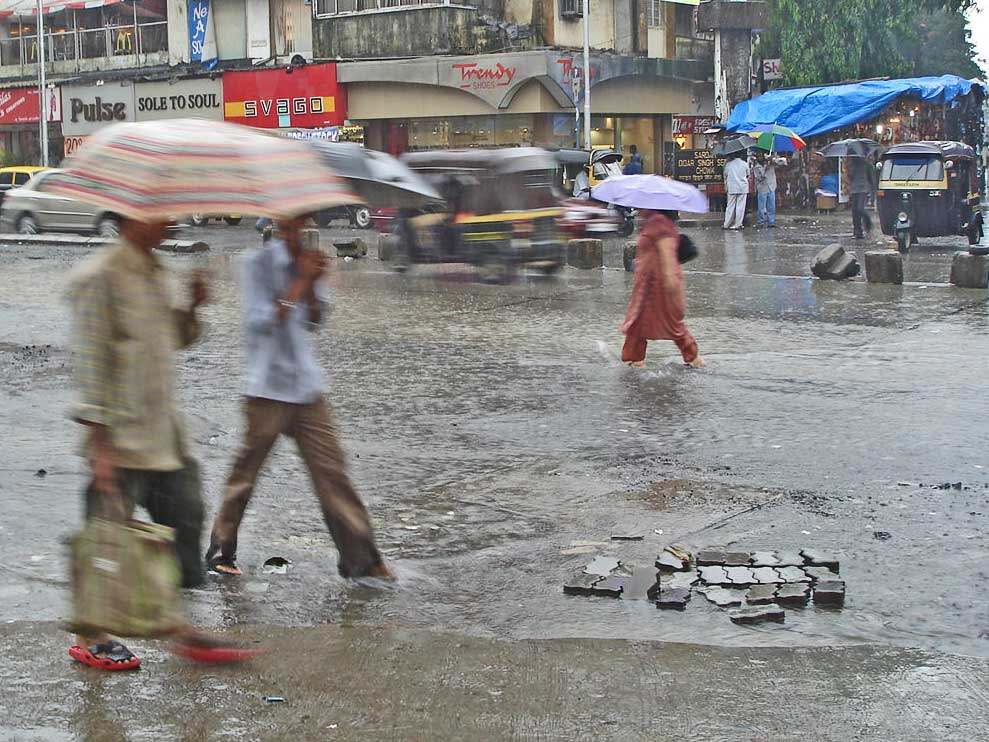
Waterlogging due to showers

In this month the city receives the maximum amount of rain. July and August are characterized by almost non-stop rain and weeks of no sunshine. A continuous monsoon current covers the entire western coast of India during this period. Rainfall activity is less stormy and more constant with a relatively constant breeze from the West or South West. It is not uncommon for parts of the city to be waterlogged during periods of persistent heavy rain. This affects the city's public transport system often leading to long delays. During periods of severe precipitation, the city's commuter rail system is often suspended because of water logging and poor visibility.

The average maximum temperature for the month is around 29.8 °C with the average minimum at 25.5 °C. Average monthly rainfall is 919.9 mm in Santacruz and 768.5 mm in Colaba. The highest 24-hour rainfall in the history of Mumbai was recorded at the Santacruz observatory of the India Meteorological Department on 26 July 2005. On this day, a record 944 mm rainfall fell over the city, causing large-scale flooding, claiming several lives and causing large-scale property damage.

=== August ===
The weather in August is almost identical to July. Towards the latter half of the month, rainfall activity tends to lessen. The coolest days of the monsoon season are often in August. The max temperature might drop to 29.3 °C during the day and 24.5 °C at night.

=== September ===
In September the intensity of rainfall decreases. The monsoons officially end in the 3rd week of September. September has unsettled weather. The rainfall is short and light and is not continuous. The end of the monsoon, much like the beginning can feature heavy thunderstorms associated with the withdrawal of the monsoon current from the city and surrounding areas. The mean maximum daily temperatures reach 30.1 °C while daily mean minimum temperature stays at 24.0 °C.

=== October ===
In the month of October, the mean daily maximum stays at around 32.9 °C and the mean daily minimum stays at 23.1 °C making it hot during the days and relatively mild during the nights.

=== November ===
The temperature continues to drop slowly in the month of November with the mean daily minimum staying at 20.5 °C and the mean daily maximum staying around 33.4 °C. There are a few unseasonable showers.

=== December ===
The day highs hover around 32.4 °C. The nights average around 18.2 °C. Humidity is low in December.

== Climate change ==
As climate change and global warming are issues of rapidly increasing importance, the Mumbai Government launched the Mumbai Climate Action Plan to tackle climate change and extreme weather events.

== Cyclones in Mumbai ==
Sitting on the coast, Mumbai is vulnerable to cyclones, but as the cyclones in the Arabian Sea turn to the Arabian Peninsula or Gujarat, Mumbai stands less affected. Cyclones that have affected Mumbai include 1618, 1698, 1702, 1740, 1742, 1762, 1799, 1854, 1882 (which is believed to be a hoax), 1891 1940 1948, Cyclone Phyan, Cyclone Ockhi, Cyclone Vayu, Cyclone Nisarga, and Cyclone Tauktae.

The strongest cyclone ever recorded to hit Mumbai is the 1948 Mumbai Cyclone, which hit the city on November 21, 1948. Gusts in Juhu reached 151 km/h; torrential rains lashed the city, reaching 5 inches in only 24 hours. Flooding occurred due to heavy rains, and the city power supply was disrupted. The cyclone left 38 people dead and 47 missing. Local transport came to a standstill.

In 2021, Cyclone Tauktae battered Mumbai, reaching gusts of 114 km/h with heavy rains. The storm was catastrophic, and flight operations at Mumbai's Chhatrapati Shivaji Maharaj International Airport halted for hours due to the cyclone.
