= Agalawatte Electoral District =

Electoral district of Sri Lanka

Agalawatte electoral district was an electoral district of Sri Lanka between August 1947 and February 1989. The district was named after the town of Agalawatte in Kalutara District, Western Province. The 1978 Constitution of Sri Lanka introduced the proportional representation electoral system for electing members of Parliament. The existing 160 mainly single-member electoral districts were replaced with 22 multi-member electoral districts. Agalawatte electoral district was replaced by the Kalutara multi-member electoral district at the 1989 general elections, the first under the PR system, though Agalawatte continues to be a polling division of the multi-member electoral district.

== Members of Parliament ==
Key

Independent LSSP UNP

Election	Member	Party	Term
1947	S. A. Silva	Lanka Sama Samaja Party	1947–1952
1952	C. W. W. Kannangara	United National Party	1952–1956
1956	Anil Moonesinghe	Lanka Sama Samaja Party	1956–1960
1960 (March)	Anil Moonesinghe	Lanka Sama Samaja Party	1960-1960
1960 (July)	Anil Moonesinghe	Lanka Sama Samaja Party	1960–1965
1965	Anil Moonesinghe	Lanka Sama Samaja Party	1965–1967
1967 (by-election)	Colvin R. de Silva	Lanka Sama Samaja Party	1967–1970
1970	Colvin R. de Silva	Lanka Sama Samaja Party	1970–1977
1977	Merill Kariyawasam	United National Party	1977–1989

== Elections ==
=== 1947 Parliamentary General Election ===
Results of the 1st parliamentary election held between 23 August 1947 and 20 September 1947:

Candidate	Party	Symbol	Votes	%
S. A. Silva	Lanka Sama Samaja Party	Chair	4,135	28.02
D. D. Athulathmudali	United National Party	Bicycle	3,356	22.75
A. A. Perera	Independent	Umbrella	3,295	22.33
P. A. Wijegunawardene	Independent	Elephant	1,877	12.72
D. M. Athulathmudalige	Independent	Clock	828	5.61
W. Percy Corea	Independent	House	644	4.37
Valid Votes			14,135	95.80
Rejected Votes			620	4.20
Total Polled			14,755	100.00
Registered Electors			35,803	
Turnout				41.21

=== 1952 Parliamentary General Election ===
Results of the 2nd parliamentary election held between 24 May 1952 and 30 May 1952:

Candidate	Party	Symbol	Votes	%
C. W. W. Kannangara	United National Party	Chair	13,659	49.13
S. A. Silva	Lanka Sama Samaja Party	Star	6,627	23.84
A. P. Jayasuriya	Sri Lanka Freedom Party	Elephant	3,480	12.52
W. H. Bodhidas	Independent	Key	3,240	11.65
Benjo David Muthukuda	Independent	Lamp	440	1.58
Valid Votes			27,446	98.72
Rejected Votes			356	1.28
Total Polled			27,802	100.00
Registered Electors			36,088	
Turnout				77.04

=== 1956 Parliamentary General Election ===
Results of the 3rd parliamentary election held between 5 April 1956 and 10 April 1956:

Candidate	Party	Symbol	Votes	%
Anil Moonesinghe	Lanka Sama Samaja Party	Key	20,208	68.80
A. D. P. A. Wijegunawardena		Elephant	7,487	25.49
V. D. Chandrasinghe		Cartwheel	1,066	3.63
V. W. Henry de Mel		Chair	353	1.20
Valid Votes			29,114	99.12
Rejected Votes			260	0.88
Total Polled			29,374	100.00
Registered Electors			40,699	
Turnout				72.17

=== 1960 (March) Parliamentary General Election ===
Results of the 4th parliamentary election held on 19 March 1960:

Candidate	Party	Symbol	Votes	%
Anil Moonesinghe	Lanka Sama Samaja Party	Key	12,007	44.51
Wilmot Jayanetti	United National Party	Elephant	8,127	30.13
A. D. Jayasena	Sri Lanka Freedom Party	Hand	2,560	9.49
Walter Wijegunawardena		Cockerel	2,214	8.21
P. K. D. Chandradasa	Mahajana Eksath Peramuna	Cartwheel	1,677	6.22
Upatissa Gunawardena		Eye	223	0.83
Valid Votes			26,808	99.37
Rejected Votes			170	0.63
Total Polled			26,978	100.00
Registered Electors			34,009	
Turnout				79.33

=== 1960 (July) Parliamentary General Election ===
Results of the 5th parliamentary election held on 20 July 1960:

Candidate	Party	Symbol	Votes	%
Anil Moonesinghe	Lanka Sama Samaja Party	Key	15,668	62.33
Wilmot Jayanetti	United National Party	Elephant	9,364	37.25
Valid Votes			25,032	99.57
Rejected Votes			107	0.43
Total Polled			25,139	100.00
Registered Electors			34,009	
Turnout				73.92

=== 1965 Parliamentary General Election ===
Results of the 6th parliamentary election held on 22 March 1965:

Candidate	Party	Symbol	Votes	%
Anil Moonesinghe	Lanka Sama Samaja Party	Key	20,752	56.68
G. D. David	United National Party	Elephant	15,555	42.49
Valid Votes			36,307	99.17
Rejected Votes			304	0.83
Total Polled			36,611	100.00
Registered Electors			43,921	
Turnout				83.36

=== 1970 Parliamentary General Election ===
Results of the 7th parliamentary election held on 27 May 1970:

Candidate	Party	Symbol	Votes	%
Colvin R. de Silva	Lanka Sama Samaja Party	Key	25,164	55.43
G. D. Mahindasoma	United National Party	Elephant	19,978	44.00
A. D. P. Karunatilleke		Bell	154	0.34
Valid Votes			45,296	99.77
Rejected Votes			106	0.23
Total Polled			45,402	100.00
Registered Electors			51,367	
Turnout				88.39

=== 1977 Parliamentary General Election ===
Results of the 8th parliamentary election held on 21 July 1977:

Candidate	Party	Symbol	Votes	%
Merill Kariyawasam	United National Party	Elephant	27,181	57.22
Colvin R. de Silva	Lanka Sama Samaja Party	Key	15,805	33.27
Ananda Pasqual		Hand	3,918	8.25
Titus Silva		Chair	358	0.75
K. L. Premadasa Sarathkumara		Cartwheel	126	0.27
Valid Votes			47,388	99.76
Rejected Votes			114	0.24
Total Polled			47,502	100.00
Registered Electors			54,931	
Turnout				86.48
