= Leeds Campus of Business and Technology Sri Lanka =

== Organizational History ==

Leeds International (Pvt) Ltd was originally established in 1999, with the inauguration of the Leeds International School in Panadura. Currently, the group has 6 branches across Sri Lanka, with over 4000 in the total student population.

The main campus of LCBT is situated at No. 342 Kotte Road, Pitakotte, Sri Lanka with another branch at No. 320 Aguruwatota Road, Horana, Sri Lanka. The campus initially planned to start with courses for engineering and sports, but it would soon move into other business subjects like Management, HR, Accounting, IT, etc.

The building of the Main Campus is five-storied, with multiple facilities such as a lift, generators, internet, 90 channels of TV, a modern computer laboratory, a science lab, an auditorium, a library, and a performing arts studio.

== Campuses ==
- Colombo(Kotte)
- Panadura
- Horana
