= Climate of Agra =

Coordinates: 27°18′0″N 78°02′02″E

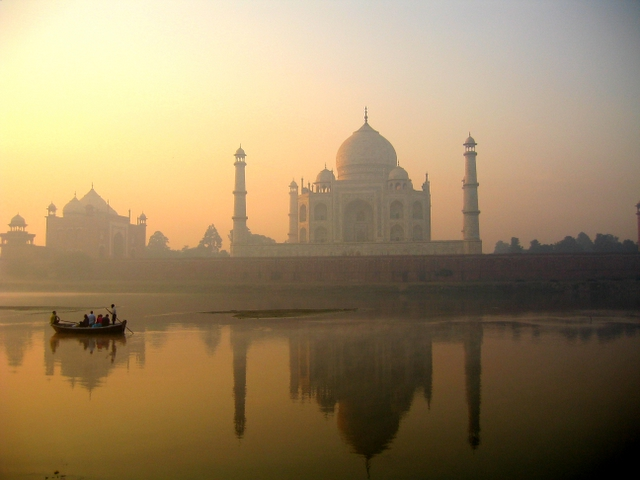
Sunset at Taj Mahal

The climate of Agra features a semi-arid climate that borders on a humid subtropical climate. The city features mild winters, hot and dry summers and a monsoon season. The monsoon, though substantial in Agra, is not quite as heavy as the monsoon in other parts of India. The mean annual rainfall of Agra district is 671 mm (26.4 in). The district receives the majority of this rainfall during the monsoon months i.e., June to September, which averages around 603 mm (23.7 in). Agra has a reputation for being one of the hottest and the coldest towns in India. In summer the city witnesses a sudden surge in temperature and at times, mercury goes beyond the 46 °C (115 °F) mark in addition to a very high level of humidity. During summer, the daytime temperature hovers around 46–50 °C (115–122 °F). Nights are relatively cooler and temperature lowers to 30 °C (86 °F). Winter minimum temperatures sometimes go as low as 3 or 3.5 °C (37.4 or 38.3 °F) but usually hover in the range of 6–8 °C (43–46 °F).

== Factors ==
The monsoon and the Western Disturbance are the two main factors that alter the weather over Agra; otherwise, Continental air will prevail for the rest of the year. Like most cities of Northwestern India, the weather and climate of Agra are extreme and subtropical in nature. The following are the main factors that influence the weather in Agra:

- Western Disturbances mostly occur during the winter months and cause light to moderate showers, temperature also decreases due to it.
- Southwest Monsoon occurs in summer from June till September. Monsoon rains bring much-awaited relief from the scorching heat. These monsoon rains are quite heavy by nature and can cause significant flooding.
- Continental air prevails during the period when there is no precipitation in Agra.

== Monthly weather conditions ==
Like other cities, Agra has four seasons: winter (Dec-Feb), summer (May-Sept), autumn (Oct-Nov) and spring (March–April). The monsoon season occurs in the summer. The following is a monthly summary of climatic conditions in Agra based on data from the India Meteorological Department.

=== January ===
January is the coldest month in the city and Western Disturbance also occurs in this month coming from Northern Pakistan. The highest monthly average maximum temperature recorded was 26.1 °C (79.0 °F) in 1932. The lowest monthly average minimum temperature recorded was 3.1 °C (37.6 °F) in 1927 and the highest monthly rainfall recorded was 51.8 millimetres (2.04 in) in 1947.

=== February ===
Cold conditions continue until the middle of February, after that the weather becomes settled and pleasant. Winter showers also occur in this month. The highest monthly average maximum temperature recorded was 29.1 °C (84.4 °F) in 1993. The lowest monthly average minimum temperature recorded was 5.8 °C (42.4 °F) in 1925 and the highest monthly rainfall recorded was 506.2 millimetres (19.93 in) in 1980.

=== March ===
Hot and dry weather returns during March. The highest monthly average maximum temperature recorded was 35.4 °C (95.7 °F) in 1994. The lowest monthly average minimum temperature recorded was 10.7 °C (51.3 °F) in 2000 and the highest monthly rainfall recorded was 45.7 millimetres (1.80 in) in 1944.

=== April ===
Temperatures start to rise in this month. The highest monthly average maximum temperature recorded was 41.1 °C (106.0 °F) in 1921. The lowest monthly average minimum temperature recorded was 16.4 °C (61.5 °F) in 1999 and the highest monthly rainfall recorded was 61.8 millimetres (2.43 in) in 1984.

=== May ===
May is the hottest month of Agra city. The highest monthly average maximum temperature recorded was 44.6 °C (112.3 °F) in 1921. The lowest monthly average minimum temperature recorded was 18.6 °C (65.5 °F) in 1999 and the highest monthly rainfall recorded was 62.0 millimetres (2.44 in) in 1987.

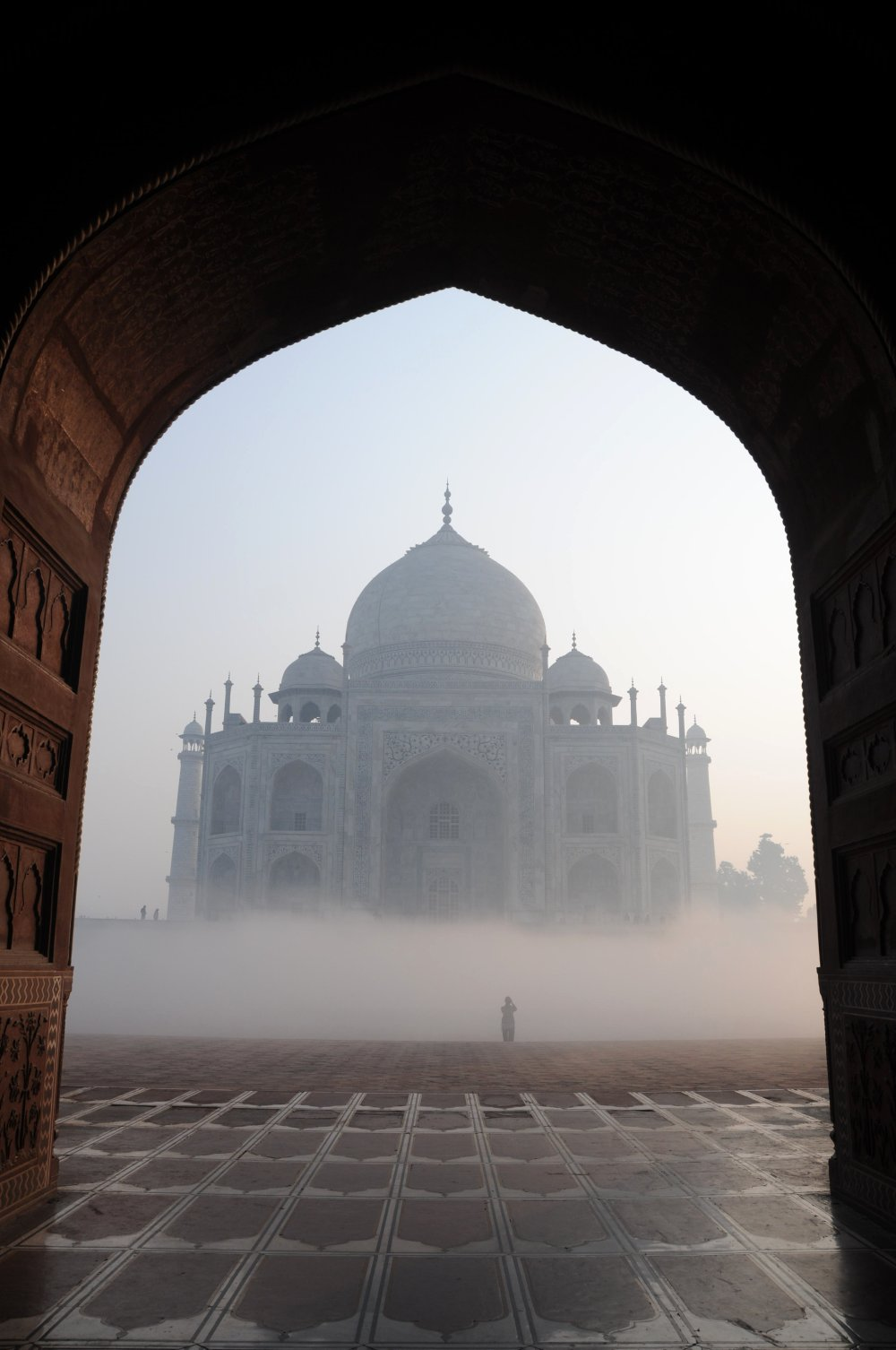
Mist surrounds the Taj Mahal

=== June ===
It remains hot but during the middle or end of June, pre-monsoon showers can start. The highest monthly average maximum temperature recorded was 43.3 °C (109.9 °F) in 1924. The lowest monthly average minimum temperature recorded was 17.5 °C (63.5 °F) in 1999 and the highest monthly rainfall recorded was 355.8 millimetres (14.01 in) in "1952".

=== July ===
Monsoon season starts in July. The highest monthly average maximum temperature recorded was 40.7 °C (105.3 °F) in 1911. The lowest monthly average minimum temperature recorded was 19.6 °C (67.3 °F) in 2000 and highest monthly rainfall recorded was 551.2 millimetres (21.70 in) in 1994.

=== August ===
August is the wettest month of Agra city. The highest monthly average maximum temperature recorded was 37.4 °C (99.3 °F) in 1987. The lowest monthly average minimum temperature recorded was 16.7 °C (62.1 °F) in 1999 and the highest monthly rainfall recorded was 617.7 millimetres (24.32 in) in 1957.

=== September ===
The intensity of rainstorm decreases in the month of September as monsoon starts to withdraw. The highest monthly average maximum temperature recorded was 38.4 °C (101.1 °F) in 1913. The lowest monthly average minimum temperature recorded was 17.1 °C (62.8 °F) in 1999 and highest monthly rainfall recorded was 609.0 millimetres (23.98 in) in 1939.

=== October ===
Post-monsoon rains could occur in this month. The highest monthly average maximum temperature recorded was 36.1 °C (97.0 °F) in 1993. The lowest monthly average minimum temperature recorded was 14.6 °C (58.3 °F) in 1999 and the Highest monthly rainfall recorded was 268.7 millimetres (10.58 in) in 1911.

=== November ===
It is the driest month of the city. The highest monthly average maximum temperature recorded was 30.7 °C (87.3 °F) in 1987. The lowest monthly average minimum temperature recorded was 8.0 °C (46.4 °F) in 1999 and the highest monthly rainfall recorded was 75.9 millimetres (2.99 in) in 1969.

=== December ===
Winter season begins in this month. The highest monthly average maximum temperature recorded was 25.8 °C (78.4 °F) in 1992. The lowest monthly average minimum temperature recorded was 3.7 °C (38.7 °F) in 1999 and the highest monthly rainfall recorded was 62.6 millimetres (2.46 in) in 1967.

== Statistics ==
Climate data for Agra (1991–2020, extremes 1901–2002)
Month	Jan	Feb	Mar	Apr	May	Jun	Jul	Aug	Sep	Oct	Nov	Dec	Year
Record high °C (°F)	33.0 (91.4)	35.6 (96.1)	42.8 (109.0)	47.3 (117.1)	48.6 (119.5)	48.5 (119.3)	46.5 (115.7)	43.0 (109.4)	41.4 (106.5)	41.1 (106.0)	36.5 (97.7)	31.0 (87.8)	48.6 (119.5)
Mean daily maximum °C (°F)	22.2 (72.0)	26.2 (79.2)	32.1 (89.8)	38.4 (101.1)	41.9 (107.4)	41.1 (106.0)	36.0 (96.8)	33.1 (91.6)	34.2 (93.6)	34.7 (94.5)	29.2 (84.6)	23.7 (74.7)	32.7 (90.9)
Mean daily minimum °C (°F)	7.4 (45.3)	10.4 (50.7)	14.2 (57.6)	20.0 (68.0)	24.4 (75.9)	25.5 (77.9)	24.7 (76.5)	23.9 (75.0)	23.5 (74.3)	18.7 (65.7)	13.2 (55.8)	8.1 (46.6)	17.9 (64.2)
Record low °C (°F)	−2.2 (28.0)	−1.7 (28.9)	5.5 (41.9)	10.0 (50.0)	14.0 (57.2)	12.0 (53.6)	14.5 (58.1)	12.0 (53.6)	13.0 (55.4)	9.4 (48.9)	2.8 (37.0)	−0.6 (30.9)	−2.2 (28.0)
Average rainfall mm (inches)	12.5 (0.49)	10.8 (0.43)	8.3 (0.33)	8.5 (0.33)	21.4 (0.84)	46.4 (1.83)	245.8 (9.68)	198.6 (7.82)	110.8 (4.36)	24.7 (0.97)	2.5 (0.10)	3.2 (0.13)	693.6 (27.31)
Average rainy days	1.2	0.8	1.2	0.9	1.8	3.2	10.3	10.1	5.8	1.2	0.2	0.5	37.2
Average relative humidity (%) (at 17:30 IST)	63	52	44	40	39	45	69	78	69	53	63	65	57
Average dew point °C (°F)	8 (46)	11 (52)	13 (55)	14 (57)	17 (63)	21 (70)	25 (77)	25 (77)	23 (73)	18 (64)	13 (55)	10 (50)	17 (62)
Average ultraviolet index	5	6	7	9	9	9	7	7	8	7	6	4	7
Source 1: India Meteorological DepartmentTime and Date (dewpoints, 2005-2015)
Source 2: NOAA (1971–1990),Weather Atlas

== See also ==
- Climate of India
- Climate of Mumbai
- Climate of Delhi
