= Cyclone Ockhi =

North Indian Ocean cyclone in 2017

Very Severe Cyclonic Storm Ockhi
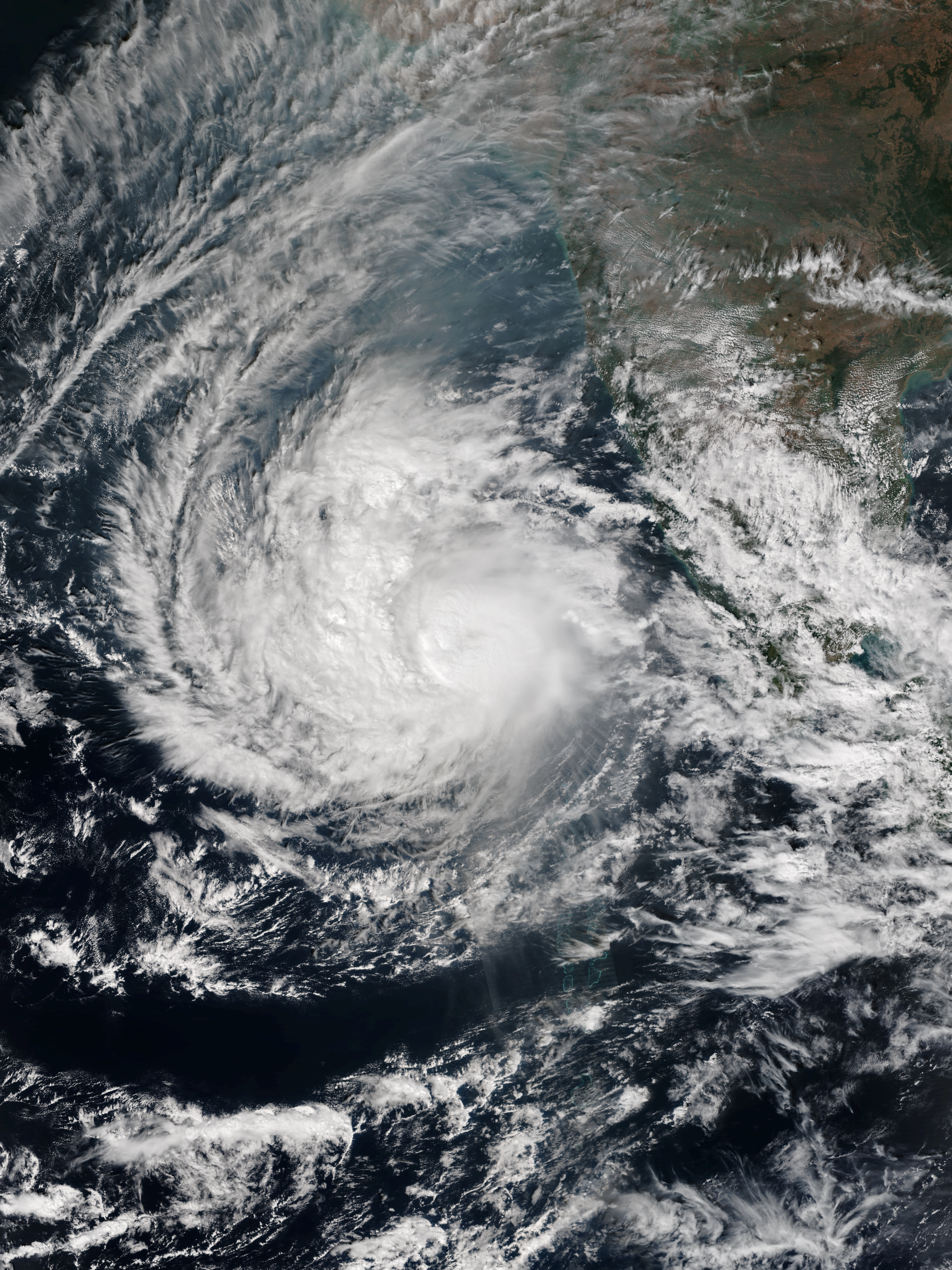
- Cyclone Ockhi near peak intensity west of Lakshadweep on 2 December

Meteorological history
- Formed: 29 November 2017
- Extratropical: 4 December 2017
- Dissipated: 6 December 2017

Very severe cyclonic storm
- 3-minute sustained (IMD)
- Highest winds: 155 km/h (100 mph)
- Lowest pressure: 976 hPa (mbar); 28.82 inHg

Category 3-equivalent tropical cyclone
- 1-minute sustained (SSHWS/JTWC)
- Highest winds: 185 km/h (115 mph)
- Lowest pressure: 948 hPa (mbar); 27.99 inHg

Overall effects
- Fatalities: 318
- Missing: 141
- Damage: $920 million (2017 USD)
- Areas affected: Southern India, Sri Lanka and Maldives
- IBTrACS
- Part of the 2017 North Indian Ocean cyclone season

Very Severe Cyclonic Storm Ockhi (Note: The name Ockhi (Bengali: অক্ষি; [ˈokʰːiˑ]) was contributed by Bangladesh and means "eye" in Bengali.) was a strong tropical cyclone that devastated parts of Sri Lanka and India in 2017, and was the most intense tropical cyclone in the Arabian Sea since Cyclone Megh in 2015. The ninth depression, and the third and strongest named storm of the 2017 North Indian Ocean cyclone season, Ockhi originated from an area of low pressure that formed over the southwest Bay of Bengal on 28 November. The storm organized into a Depression off southeast coast of Sri Lanka on 29 November, causing damage to property and life in Sri Lanka while passing by. Due to high atmospheric moisture and warmer oceanic surface temperature between Sri Lanka and Kanyakumari (Cape Comorin) in mainland India, Ockhi intensified into a cyclonic storm on 30 November.

While near Kanyakumari in mainland India, Ockhi changed course and intensified while heading towards Lakshadweep in the Arabian Sea. Ockhi impacted Lakshadweep on 2 December, uprooting coconut trees and causing extensive damage to houses, power lines and other infrastructure on the islands. Ockhi weakened into a well-marked low near the south coast of Gujarat, India, on 6 December, before crossing the coastline and dissipating shortly afterward. In its entirety, Ockhi left a trail of massive destruction in Sri Lanka, Lakshadweep, South India, and The Maldives, as it strengthened from a depression to a mature cyclone. Though it rapidly weakened during its final stages over the Arabian Sea, it caused heavy rainfall along the western coast of India, particularly in Maharashtra and Gujarat. Ockhi caused at least 245 fatalities, including 218 in India and 27 in Sri Lanka, and the storm left at least 550 people missing, mainly fishermen.

== Meteorological history ==
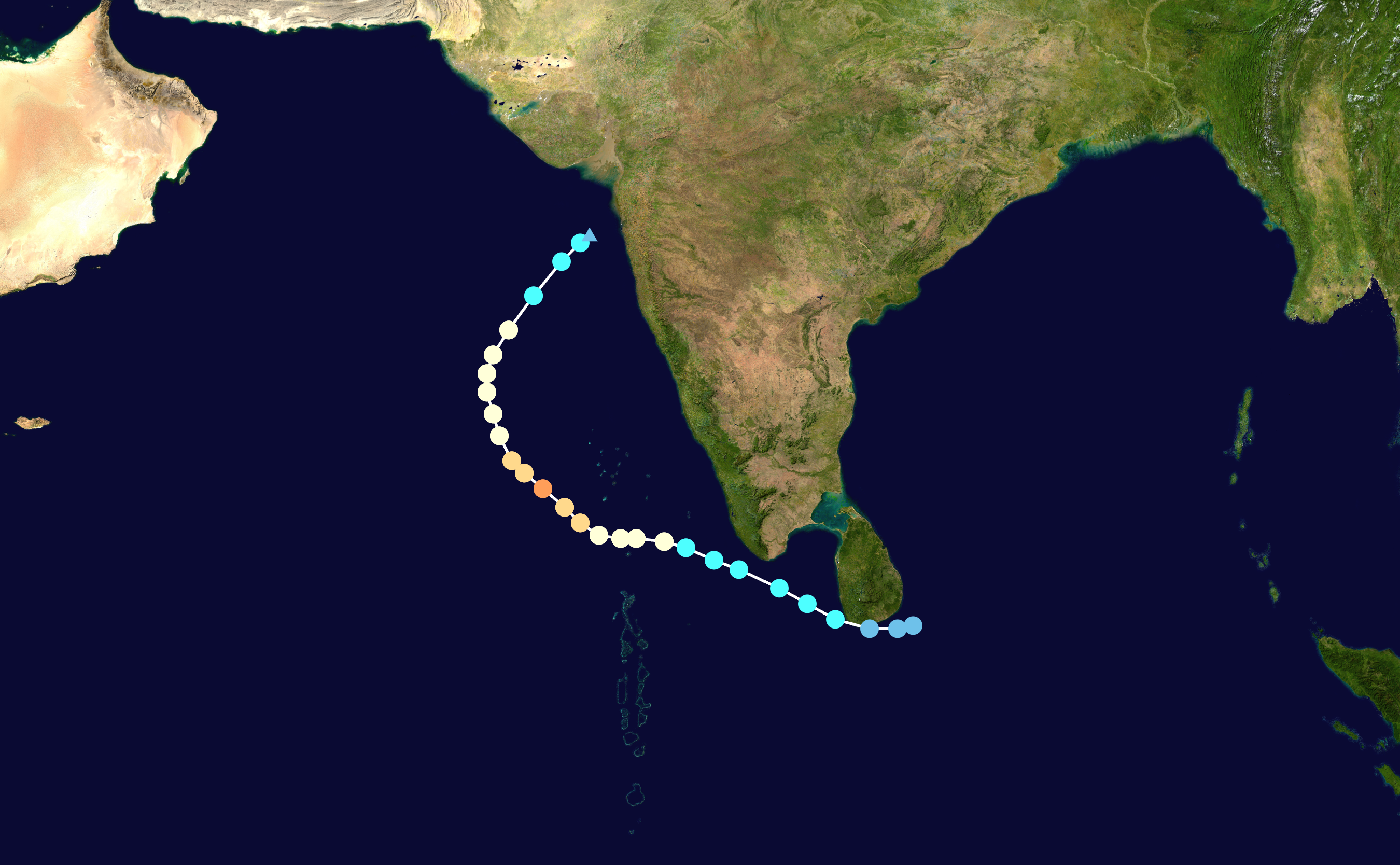
Map plotting the storm's track and intensity, according to the Saffir–Simpson scale Map key Saffir–Simpson scale Tropical depression (≤38 mph, ≤62 km/h) Tropical storm (39–73 mph, 63–118 km/h) Category 1 (74–95 mph, 119–153 km/h) Category 2 (96–110 mph, 154–177 km/h) Category 3 (111–129 mph, 178–208 km/h) Category 4 (130–156 mph, 209–251 km/h) Category 5 (≥157 mph, ≥252 km/h) Unknown Storm type Tropical cyclone Subtropical cyclone Extratropical cyclone, remnant low, tropical disturbance, or monsoon depression

On 28 November, an area of low pressure from the remnant energy of Tropical Storm Kirogi developed about 425 km (265 mi) to the south-southeast of Colombo, Sri Lanka. The disturbance was located within an area of warm sea surface temperatures and moderate to strong vertical wind shear, with atmospheric convection scattered around the disturbance's ill-defined low-level circulation center. On 29 November, the storm organized into a depression just off the southeastern coast of Sri Lanka, and the India Meteorological Department (IMD) gave the system the identifier BOB 07. Due to the storm's rapidly consolidating low level circulation center, the Joint Typhoon Warning Center issued a Tropical Cyclone Formation Alert, shortly before classifying it as Tropical Cyclone 03B on 29 November. The IMD followed suit, upgrading the storm to a Deep Depression, and soon afterwards to Cyclonic Storm Ockhi. The storm tracked along Sri Lanka's southwestern and western coastline, towards the west-northwest, around the southern verge of a subtropical ridge located over India. Owing to highly favorable conditions, the storm displayed a thick convective ring, surrounding a well-defined eye feature on the same day. The storm tracked westwards and intensified further into a Severe Cyclone Storm early on 1 December. Soon afterwards, Ockhi intensified further into a Very Severe Cyclonic Storm.

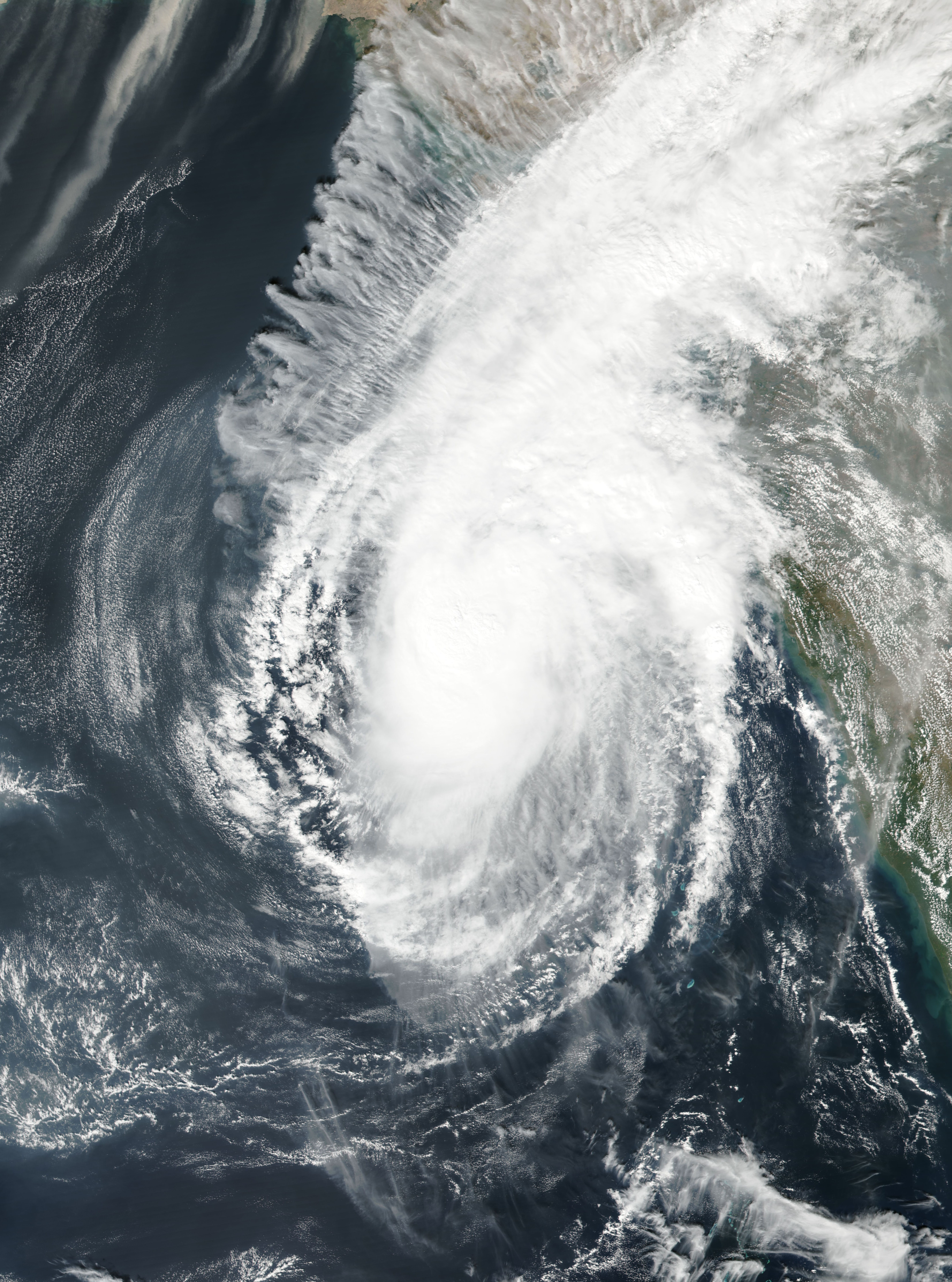
Cyclone Ockhi becoming extratropical off the West Indian coast on 4 December

As Ockhi moved further into the Arabian Sea, it traveled through an area of sea surface temperatures of 31 °C (89 °F) and decreasing wind shear; a 23 mi (37 km) eye became visible on satellite imagery, prompting the JTWC to upgrade it to a Category 3-equivalent cyclone early on 2 December. On 4 December, analysis showed that Ockhi was maintaining a source aloft, but there was restricted outflow on the western edge, due to a deepening trough advancing rapidly from the west. Increasing vertical wind shear along with a deep layered subtropical ridge to the east steered it north-northeast, and a dry air intrusion from the west gradually weakened the system. On the following day, the power of the storm quickly lessened as it encountered increasingly unfavorable conditions, including high wind shear. Dry and cold air from the northern parts of India rapidly weakened the storm, and it was last noted as a well-marked low-pressure area south of the Gulf of Cambay on 6 December. Afterward, the remnant of Ockhi crossed over land and dissipated several hours later. During its lifetime as a tropical cyclone, Ockhi traveled a distance of 2,538 km.

== Preparations ==
=== Sri Lanka ===
Despite international weather reports on 26–27 November warning of a possible storm condition over parts of the island, the Meteorology Department of Sri Lanka issued no warning on the lead-up to the cyclone, dismissing in a statement on 28 November reports of any possible adverse weather systems forming off the country's coast, citing insufficient data to arrive at such a conclusion. The department instead predicted rain of 75 mm (3.0 in) or more over various parts of the island over the period of 28–30 November. The Department of Meteorology also issued a weather advisory for heavy rain, strong winds, and rough seas on the morning of 28 November, at 1130 IST. The advisory was extended into the land areas on the morning of 29 November, at 0500 IST. A series of advisories were issued during this period, until the effect of the cyclone lessened over the island.

=== Maldives ===
The Maldives Meteorological Centre predicted heavy rain and strong winds across the country's atolls, particularly those in the north and center of the island chain, over the day. It issued a Yellow Alert warning on 30 November for the area between Haa Alif Atoll and Kaafu Atoll, between 10:30 am and 3:30 pm on 1 December, later extending this warning to 8:00 pm.

=== India ===
Close to 220 families were moved from the coastal areas of Kochi as a precaution, due to a storm surge at Chellanam. Nearly 100 houses, mostly in Puthenthode and Bazaar, were vacated and schools were used as rehabilitation centres. 180 families in Chellanam, 17 in Kannamaly and 18 in Edavanakad were moved to these centres, where food and medicine was available. The Government of Maharashtra announced a holiday on 5 December for schools in the MMR and in some other selective districts, for safety purposes.

== Impact ==
Deaths and damage by territory
Territory	Fatalities	Missing	Damage (2017 USD)	Sources
Sri Lanka	26	N/A	Unknown	
Tamil Nadu	203	N/A	$155 million	
Kerala	89	141	$286 million	
Lakshadweep	N/A	N/A	>$77.5 million	
Totals:	318	141	>$518 million	

=== Sri Lanka ===
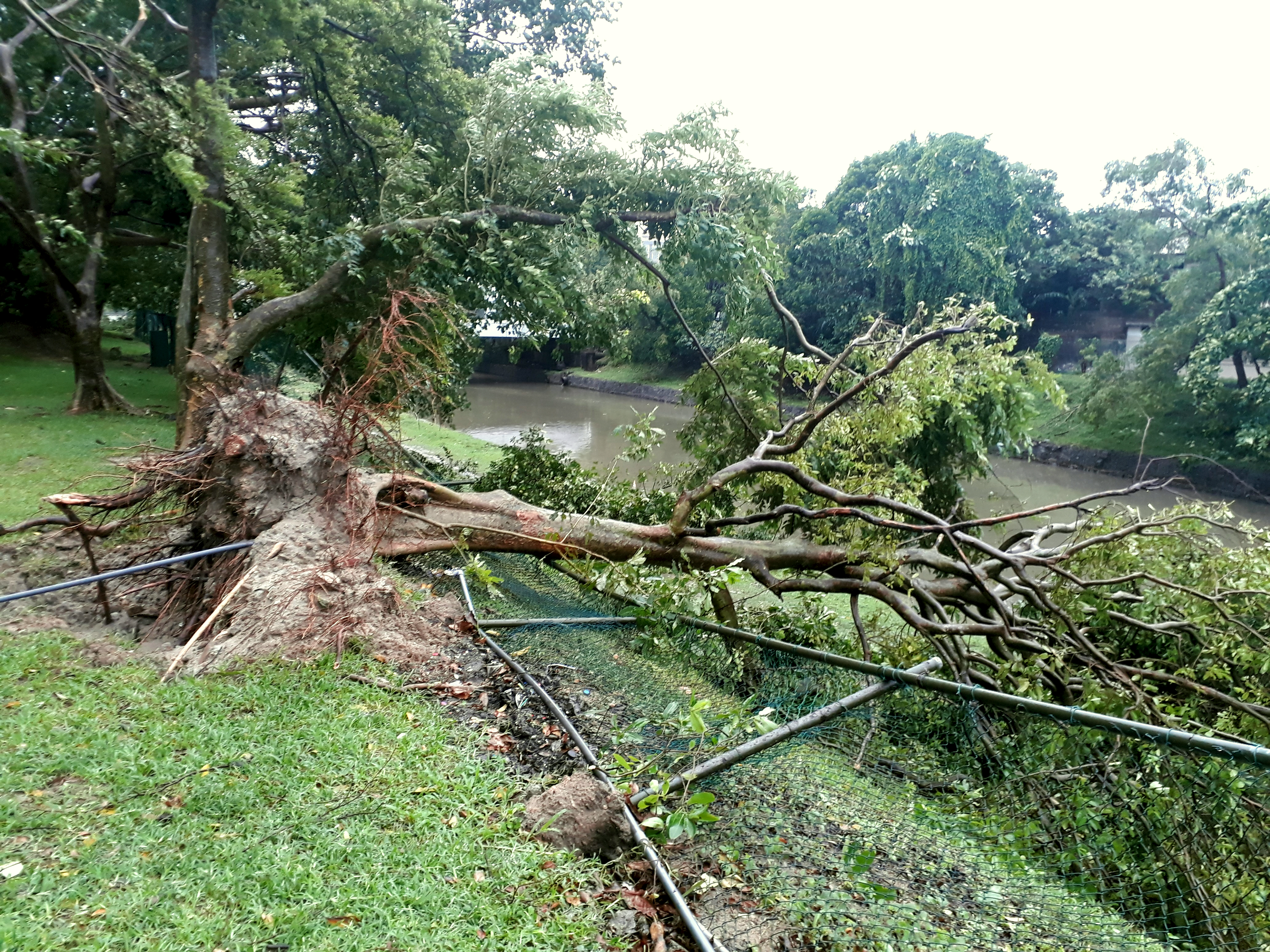
Many trees were uprooted due to strong winds in Colombo.

The system produced heavy rainfall and gale-force winds in Sri Lanka, initially affecting the southern coastline, with Matara, and the general Matara District in particular, experiencing wind speeds of 70–80 km/h (40–50 mph) and bearing the brunt of the cyclone. Falling trees and damage to power transmission lines resulted in power outages in affected areas, with Matara, Galle and Ambalangoda among the worst affected. Colombo and its suburbs, along with the southwestern and western coastal regions, were also affected, with many parts of the capital city and its suburbs experiencing power outages and property damage; several roads were obstructed by falling trees and power lines, including that leading to the Supreme Court complex at Aluthkade. Due to the poor visibility caused by rain and attendant wind, BIA was prompted to divert two SriLankan Airlines flights to Mattala early on 30 November. The Meteorological Department issued a Red Alert early on 30 November, with schools in the Western, Central, Southern and Uva provinces given a holiday on the same day by order of the Ministry of Education, postponing exams meant to be held on the day.

On 1 December, several government agencies issued a series of warnings, with the country's Disaster Management Center issuing a flood warning for areas along the Nilwala, Gin and Kalu rivers, while the Irrigation Department reported Millakanda (along the Kalu), Baddegama (on the Gin) and Panadugama (on the Nilwala) as areas particularly prone to floods, with Baddegama and Panadugama already experiencing minor localized flooding. The National Building Research Organisation issued a warning to Kalutara District and its surroundings, with a focus on Palindanuwara, Bulathsinhala, Ingiriya and Agalawatta in particular, predicting landslides and sinkhole formation. The Department of Meteorology issued heavy rain warnings for the Northern, North-Central, Uva, Southern, Western, Sabaragamuwa and Central provinces, and an additional one to fishing communities warning of rough seas and winds up to 70 km/h (43 mph). On 2 December, police and firefighters were formally joined by the Sri Lankan Navy- followed by the army and air force in search and rescue operations, with the aid of state agencies and the Sri Lankan Red Cross.

=== Maldives ===
Several seafaring vessels were capsized on 30 November:

- a cargo boat off Cinnamon Dhonveli island in Kaafu Atoll (3 rescued),
- a cargo boat off Taj Coral Reef in Kaafu Atoll 20195 (3 rescued),
- a speedboat off Maaungoodhoo island in Shaviyani Atoll (13 rescued).

In all, 14 separate incidents were reported in the Maldivian seas as a result of Ockhi's effects.

As of 3 December, houses across 62 islands in the Maldives had been damaged by the fringe effects of Ockhi; 36 islands had experienced rain-induced floods while a further 4 had been inundated by storm tides. The Maldives National Defence Force was assigned to rescue and flood draining efforts predominantly on islands where the local citizenry could not manage on their own; the police too provided aid.

=== India ===
Cyclone Ockhi passed just south of Puthalam, the southern tip of mainland India, on 30 November. Though it turned to northeast and headed towards the Lakshadweep Islands in the Arabian Sea, it caused havoc and destruction in the southernmost districts of Tamil Nadu and Kerala, particularly the Kanyakumari District of Tamil Nadu and the Thiruvananthapuram District of Kerala. Damage throughout Kerala was initially estimated at Rs 1843 crore (US$285.7 million). In Tamil Nadu, damage was estimated more than Rs 1000 crore (US$155 million). As a deep depression, the system lashed the coasts of Tamil Nadu and Kerala, damaging infrastructure and taking the lives of 22 people. On 2 December, the cyclone hit the Lakshadweep islands, suffering more than Rs 500 crore (US$77.5 million) loss.

The Southern Railway announced partial cancellation of train services between Nagercoil and Kanyakumari, Nagercoil and Thiruvananthapuram, and Nagercoil and Tirunelveli due to heavy rain caused by Ockhi. Torrential overnight rains, accompanied by squally winds lashed the district, uprooted 550 trees and 950 electric poles, disrupting normal life. Many parts suffered power cuts, even as educational institutions remained closed in the districts of Tirunelveli, Tuticorin, Virudhunagar and Thanjavur. The Indian Navy and Coast Guard searched for stranded fishermen in the coastal areas of Lakshadweep. More than 400 people were rescued and evacuated, and few cadavers were found. The coastal areas of Ernakulam District, in Kerala, were affected by the cyclone. Around 2,648 people were evacuated to seven shelters over by Kochi. The cyclone claimed five lives in the Kanyakumari District of Tamil Nadu on 30 November, caused by falling trees. The cyclone went on to hit the Lakshadweep islands on 2 December. The three major islands of Lakshadweep—Minicoy, Kalpeni, and Kavaratti—suffered major damages. A desalination plant at Kavaratti was also damaged. The cyclone then moved away from Lakshadweep towards the western coast of India on 4 December, bringing rare December rainfall to Mumbai and nearby. In Goa, beach shacks were hit by high tides caused by Cyclone Ockhi. Several major beaches in the state were affected due to the sudden ingress of water, which resulted in inundation of the shacks and soil erosion. Almost 50 shacks in the Morjim, Mandrem, Arambol and Querim Beaches in Pernem taluka were damaged. In Bardez taluka, only soil erosion at Anjuna and Baga Beaches and damage to a retaining wall at Coco Beach in Nerul were reported. Unseasonal rain and inclement weather in the wake of Cyclone Ockhi had severely impacted grape farms in Maharashtra. The Nashik District received 125.5 mm of rain, due to the impact of Ockhi. Cyclone Ockhi dumped more than 80,000 kg or 80 tonnes of waste from the ocean on the Mumbai beaches, according to estimates released by the Brihanmumbai Municipal Corporation's (BMC) solid waste management (SWM) department.

In Gujarat, parts of southern region received significant rains, with the highest rainfall in Umargam of 90 mm, causing damage to vegetables and banana crops. Strong winds of 25 km/h were also recorded. The cloudy and chilly weather also affected people and crops.

== Aftermath ==
=== Sri Lanka ===
On 3 December, the government allocated Rs 170 million from the national insurance trust fund for relief efforts targeting affected citizens, distributed among each divisional secretariat affected. Rs 10,000 was pledged as an initial allowance for each family affected to a significant degree by Ockhi. A parliamentary debate held on the same day saw the government pledge to upgrade the country's meteorological department with an automated network of rain gauges, and announce state compensation for damaged housing and businesses, as well as for domestic appliances damaged by the cyclone or resultant effects, and compensation for lives lost.

As of 4 December 2017, the cyclone had caused 26 confirmed deaths, with a further 77 injured; the Disaster Management Center reported 123,217 people of 35,354 families in 16 districts as having been affected, with 5,650 individuals of 1,424 displaced families having been provided shelter at 65 emergency welfare centers. 823 houses were reported completely destroyed, with a further 32,347 sustaining damage to varying degrees.

=== India ===
Kerala and Tamil Nadu sent special rescue teams on 2 December to track missing fishermen who were at sea during the onset of the cyclone, due to protests in coastal areas over the unsatisfactory response from government agencies. Edappadi K. Palaniswami encouraged Rajnath Singh to involve the Navy and Coast Guard in search operations. The Chief Minister of Kerala, Pinarayi Vijayan, claimed that 400 stranded fishermen were rescued. The government sought a relief package, worth ₹7,340 crore (US$1.14 billion). Close to 12 boats, housing 138 fishermen in total, arrived at Kalpeni, while four other boats arrived at Androth, Kithan and Chatlet, all of which were in Lakshadweep. Lakshadweep experienced massive coastal erosion, power disruption, extensive damage to property and water shortages. People were provided with humanitarian assistance and disaster relief by the Indian Navy in Lakshadweep. The navy transported relief material to Minicoy, Kavaratti, and Kalpeni on Sunday. 4 tonnes of material, including rice, dal, salt and potatoes, water, blankets, raincoats, disposable clothes, mosquito nets and dhurries, were given to the local government. It was reported that dry provisions and ready to eat meals were also being transported to Bitra Island by helicopter from Dweeprakshak base in the island of Kavaratti. The government claimed the relief material would last for a week for 2,000 people. Tamil Nadu's government stated on 6 December that as many as 4,501 houses in Cyclone Ockhi-hit Kanyakumari had suffered partial and full damage and relief to the tune of ₹41 lakh had been provided. A government release quoted 1,687 houses had been damaged completely while 2,814 houses had suffered partial damage. The government asked for a relief of ₹9,302 crore (US$1.44 billion).

According to government officials, about 33,000 people from Kerala and another 2,800 from Tamil Nadu were affected by the cyclone as of 30 November 2017. The Centre Government reported that 39 people had died and 167 were missing, after the cyclone hit parts of Kerala and Tamil Nadu. Authorities conducted rescue operations that attempted to locate the missing people in Tamil Nadu, Kerala and Lakshadweep. An estimated number of 74 fishermen from Tamil Nadu and 93 from Kerala were missing. The Chief Minister of Kerala, Pinarayi Vijayan, declared a compensation of ₹20 lakh to the families of those who died and ₹5 lakh to those who were permanently disabled due to the cyclone. He also announced that fishermen and their children will be paid ₹60 and ₹ 45 as an allowance for a week along with free food and rations for the residents of the coastal villages for a period of a month.

== Government controversy ==
Chief Minister of Kerala complained to Prime Minister Narendra Modi that he had a negligent attitude towards states ruled by the Left. The complaint was that in the matter of Ockhi and the natural calamity that followed, the centre had a different attitude. The Centre inquired with Tamil Nadu's Chief Minister about the situation but did not inquire about Kerala. Fishermen and their families protested and did not allow Vijayan's car to pass through during his visit of Vizhinjam, a fishing village near Thiruvananthapuram. The protesters claimed that the Government of Kerala was late in issuing warning to the fishermen on 29 November, when the cyclone was in depression state near Sri Lanka. The Kerala Disaster Management Authority blamed the India Meteorological Department, claiming that they had only issued a fishing advisory, and not a warning. Sekhar Kuriakose, the member secretary of the Kerala Disaster Management Authority, claimed in a press statement on 1 December that it was not possible for the MET department to issue a cyclone warning on 29 November, as the cyclone was still a deep depression on 30 November until noon.

== See also ==
- Weather of 2017
- Tropical cyclones in 2017
- 2015 Gujarat cyclone
- Cyclone Megh
- Cyclone Chapala
