= Kajugaswatta =

Coordinates: 6°28′N 80°32′E

Kajugaswatta is a village in Kalutara district in the western province of Sri Lanka.

It is located 42 km (26 mi) away from Colombo. Nearest towns are Horana and Bandaragama, each about 7 km (4 mi) away.

The Divisional Secretariat is Millaniya.
