= List of ambassadors of Sri Lanka to China =

Coordinates: 39.912154°N 116.444492°E

Ambassador of Sri Lanka to China
- Incumbent; Palitha Kohona since 14 April 2021
- Inaugural holder: Claude Corea
- Formation: 8 September 1956

The Sri Lankan Ambassador to China is the Sri Lankan envoy to the People's Republic of China. He is concurrently accredited as Ambassador to Mongolia and North Korea. The current ambassador is Dr. Karunasena Kodituwakku.

The Sri Lankan ambassador in Beijing is the official representative of the Government in Colombo to the Government of the People's Republic of China and concurrently accredited in Pyongyang (North Korea) and Ulaanbaatar (Mongolia).

== List of representatives ==
Diplomatic agrément/Diplomatic accreditation	Ambassador	Observations	List of prime ministers of Sri Lanka	Premier of the People's Republic of China	Term end
8 September 1956	Claude Corea	Special Ambassador to China, at the head of a Ceylon Government Delegation that was to have preliminary discussions with the Government of the People's Republic of China regarding the establishment of diplomatic relations, trade expansion, economic co-operation and cultural exchanges.	S. W. R. D. Bandaranaike	Zhou Enlai	
February 1957	Wilmot A. Perera	In February 1957 Wilmot A. Perera was appointed Sri Lanka's first ambassador to China.	S. W. R. D. Bandaranaike	Zhou Enlai	
1958	William Gopallawa		S. W. R. D. Bandaranaike	Zhou Enlai	1961
1961	Alwin Bernard Perea		Sirimavo Bandaranaike	Zhou Enlai	1963
1964	Stephen Frederick de Silva		Sirimavo Bandaranaike	Zhou Enlai	1965
1965	Don Benjamin Rupasinghe Gunawardena	Robert Gunawardena, Ceylon has no Ambassador in Hanoi or Saigon, but Mr. Gunawardena was received in Hanoi.	Dudley Shelton Senanayake	Zhou Enlai	1970
1969	Yogendra Duraiswamy	Chargé d'affaires	Dudley Shelton Senanayake	Zhou Enlai	
1970	R.L.A.I. Karannagoda	In a conversion with the Ceylonese Ambassador in Beijing, I. A. Karannagoda, Zhou Enlai, disavowed the 'Guearists'.	Sirimavo Bandaranaike	Zhou Enlai	1977
1978	Chitra Raja Dias Desinghe		Ranasinghe Premadasa	Hua Guofeng	1979
31 May 1980	Chithambaranathan Mahendran	In July 1992 he was ambassador in Tokyo, Japan.	Ranasinghe Premadasa	Zhao Ziyang	1983
1984	Kandage Newton Samarasinghe		Ranasinghe Premadasa	Zhao Ziyang	
1993	Wilhelm Woutersz		Ranil Wickremesinghe	Li Peng	1997
12 November 1997	Rodney Vandergert		Sirimavo Bandaranaike	Li Peng	2000
2002	Bernard Anton Bandara Goonetilleke		Mahinda Rajapaksa	Wen Jiabao	2004
2008	Karunatilaka Amunugama		Ratnasiri Wickremanayake	Wen Jiabao	16 August 2011
16 August 2011	Ranjit Uyangoda		D. M. Jayaratne	Wen Jiabao	2015
2015	Karunasena Kodituwakku		Ranil Wickremesinghe	Li Keqiang	

== See also ==
- List of heads of missions from Sri Lanka
