= Sri Palee Campus =

Sri Palee Campus of the University of Colombo
- කොළඹ විශ්වවිද්‍යාලයීය ශ්‍රීපාලී මණ්ඩපය
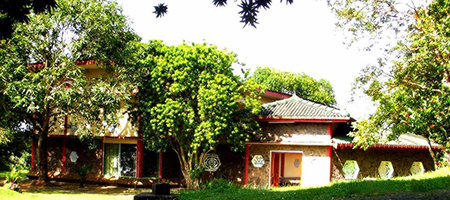
- Sri Palee Campus - Layan House
- Type: Satellite campus
- Established: 1996
- Rector: Prof. Ranjan Hettiarachchi (Chairperson)
- Location: Horana, Sri Lanka
- Publications: The International Journal of Communicology (IJC)
- Website: http://spc.cmb.ac.lk/

The Sri Palee Campus of the University of Colombo is located in Wewala, Horana, Sri Lanka. Established in 1996 it conducts undergraduate and postgraduate courses in the fields of performing arts and mass media.

== History ==
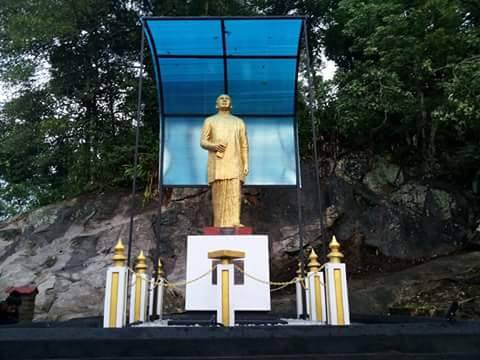
Statue of Wilmot A. Perera in the Sri Palee Campus.

The Sri Palee Campus was first established as the Western Campus of the University of Colombo by a notification of the Sri Lanka government Gazette (Extraordinary) No 928/1 dated 20 June 1996. Its name was subsequently amended as Sri Palee Campus of the University of Colombo, Sri Lanka with effect from 11.09.1998 by an order made by the Hon. Minister of Education and Higher Education under 27(1) of the Universities Act No-16 of 1978.

It is located in the Kalutara district at Wewala, Horana on the lands and buildings donated to the University of Sri Lanka in 1976 by the board of the Sri Palee Trust set up by the local politician and philanthropist Wilmot A. Perera.

== Academics ==
The campus has two faculties i.e the Faculty of Performing Arts and the Faculty of Mass Media. The academic staff of the campus is allocated to the five academic departments mentioned below based on their specialization and teaching expertise.

1. Department of Mass Media
2. Department of Performing Arts
3. Department of Computer Studies
4. Department of Language Studies

=== Undergraduate programs ===
- Bachelor of Arts (Special) in Mass Media
- Bachelor of Arts (Special) in Performing Arts

=== Postgraduate programs ===
- Postgraduate Diploma in Mass Media (one year)
- Masters in Mass Media (two years)
- M.A. in Media Research

== Center for Media Research (CMR) and Its Publications ==
The Sri Palee Campus publishes the International Journal of Communicology (IJC) via the Center for Media Research (CMR). The main task of the Center for Media Research and the International Journal of Communicology is to develop an interface between academics, practitioners, policymakers, and laypersons who are involved in and concerned with the development of the country, the media, and communication. The pioneer of the Center for Media Research (CMR) is Professor. DharmaKeerthi Sri Ranjan. He started the Center for Media Research in 2012 and processed the above journals and journals on Mediology with higher intellectual capital. He is one of the prominent media sociologists in the field of Mass Media and Communication.
