= Horana Royal College =

Royal College Horana
- රාජකීය විද්‍යාලය හොරණ

Location
- Rathnapura Road; Horana, Kalutara District, Western Province; Sri Lanka

Information
- School type: Public national 1AB
- Motto: Vidya dadathi vinayan
- Established: 1978; 48 years ago
- School district: Horana Education Zone
- Authority: Ministry of Education
- Principal: V. R. P. Kumara
- Grades: Class 1 - 13
- Gender: Mixed
- Students: Horana Royalists

Royal College Horana (Sinhala: රාජකීය විද්‍යාලය හොරණ; also known as Royal Horana or Horana Royal) is a national school in Horana, Sri Lanka.

The college was established in 1978 and became a national school in 2000.

In May 2016 President Maithripala Sirisena officially opened the school's new auditorium.

== Sports ==
Horana Royal College plays its annual cricket match (Big Match) with Siri Piyarathana College, Padukka. It is also called the Battle of Gold and Purple.

== See also ==
- List of schools in Western Province, Sri Lanka
