= Matugama Electoral District =

Electoral district of Sri Lanka

Matugama electoral district was an electoral district of Sri Lanka between August 1947 and February 1989. The district was named after the town of Matugama in Kalutara District, Western Province. The 1978 Constitution of Sri Lanka introduced the proportional representation electoral system for electing members of Parliament. The existing 160 mainly single-member electoral districts were replaced with 22 multi-member electoral districts. Matugama electoral district was replaced by the Kalutara multi-member electoral district at the 1989 general elections, the first under the PR system, though Matugama continues to be a polling division of the multi-member electoral district.

== Members of Parliament ==
Key

Independent SLFP UNP

Election	Member	Party	Term
1947	Wilmot A. Perera	Independent	1947–1952
1952	Wilmot A. Perera	Viplavakari Lanka Sama Samaja Party	1952–1956
1956	Dayasena Turnolius Pasqual	Sri Lanka Freedom Party	1956–1960
1960 (March)	Dayasena Turnolius Pasqual	Sri Lanka Freedom Party	1960-1960
1960 (July)	Dayasena Turnolius Pasqual	Sri Lanka Freedom Party	1960–1965
1965	Dayasena Turnolius Pasqual	Sri Lanka Freedom Party	1965–1970
1970	Dayasena Turnolius Pasqual	Sri Lanka Freedom Party	1970–1977
1977	Reginald V. Wijegunaratne	United National Party	1977–1983
1983 (by-election)	Anil K. Moonesinghe	Sri Lanka Freedom Party	1983–1989

== Elections ==
=== 1947 Parliamentary General Election ===
Results of the 1st parliamentary election held between 23 August 1947 and 20 September 1947 for the district:

Candidate	Party	Symbol	Votes	%
Wilmot A. Perera		Elephant	19,753	52.65
C. W. W. Kannangara		Star	16,139	43.02
R. A. Munasinghage		Lamp	1,091	2.91
Valid Votes			36,983	98.57
Rejected Votes			535	1.43
Total Polled			37,518	100.00
Registered Electors			48,407	
Turnout				77.51

=== 1952 Parliamentary General Election ===
Results of the 2nd parliamentary election held between 24 May 1952 and 30 May 1952 for the district:

Candidate	Party	Symbol	Votes	%
Wilmot A. Perera		Key	18,168	53.11
D. D. Athulathmudali		Chair	15,666	45.79
Valid Votes			33,834	98.90
Rejected Votes			376	1.10
Total Polled			34,210	100.00
Registered Electors			46,219	
Turnout				74.02

=== 1956 Parliamentary General Election ===
Results of the 3rd parliamentary election held between 5 April 1956 and 10 April 1956 for the district:

Candidate	Party	Symbol	Votes	%
Dayasena Turnolius Pasqual	Sri Lanka Freedom Party	Hand	25,798	70.70
A. C. Gooneratne	United National Party	Elephant	6,189	16.96
Reginald Perera		Cartwheel	3,920	10.74
W. M. Bibile Fonseka		Umbrella	289	0.79
Valid Votes			36,196	99.19
Rejected Votes			296	0.81
Total Polled			36,492	100.00
Registered Electors			52,095	
Turnout				70.05

=== 1960 (March) Parliamentary General Election ===
Results of the 4th parliamentary election held on 19 March 1960 for the district:

Candidate	Party	Symbol	Votes	%
Dayasena Turnolius Pasqual	Sri Lanka Freedom Party	Hand	7,099	28.64
Ratnapala Tirimanne	United National Party	Elephant	5,737	23.14
Edmund Jayanetti	Mahajana Eksath Peramuna	Cartwheel	5,670	22.87
D. S. L. Vithanage		Key	5,544	22.37
M. G. N. de S. Gunawardena		Lamp	320	1.29
Udaya Jayatileke		Eye	265	1.07
Valid Votes			24,635	99.38
Rejected Votes			154	0.62
Total Polled			24,789	100.00
Registered Electors			32,377	
Turnout				76.56

=== 1960 (July) Parliamentary General Election ===
Results of the 5th parliamentary election held on 20 July 1960 for the district:

Candidate	Party	Symbol	Votes	%
Dayasena Turnolius Pasqual	Sri Lanka Freedom Party	Hand	14,790	61.81
De Alwis Seneviratne	United National Party	Elephant	7,752	32.40
Simon Lewis		Cartwheel	1,294	5.41
Valid Votes			23,836	99.61
Rejected Votes			94	0.39
Total Polled			23,930	100.00
Registered Electors			32,377	
Turnout				73.91

=== 1965 Parliamentary General Election ===
Results of the 6th parliamentary election held on 22 March 1965 for the district:

Candidate	Party	Symbol	Votes	%
Dayasena Turnolius Pasqual	Sri Lanka Freedom Party	Hand	18,122	56.16
M. D. J. Dissanayake		Chair	7,026	21.78
K. Bandula Jayasinghe	Mahajana Eksath Peramuna	Cartwheel	5,909	18.31
D. P. Samaraweera		Sun	865	2.68
Valid Votes			31,922	98.93
Rejected Votes			344	1.07
Total Polled			32,266	100.00
Registered Electors			40,399	
Turnout				79.87

=== 1970 Parliamentary General Election ===
Results of the 7th parliamentary election held on 27 May 1970 for the district:

Candidate	Party	Symbol	Votes	%
Dayasena Turnolius Pasqual	Sri Lanka Freedom Party	Hand	24,718	63.66
Reginald V. Wijegunaratne	Mahajana Eksath Peramuna	Cartwheel	13,998	36.05
Valid Votes			38,716	99.70
Rejected Votes			115	0.30
Total Polled			38,831	100.00
Registered Electors			46,066	
Turnout				84.29

=== 1977 Parliamentary General Election ===
Results of the 8th parliamentary election held on 21 July 1977 for the district:

Candidate	Party	Symbol	Votes	%
Reginald V. Wijegunaratne	United National Party	Elephant	25,484	55.06
Dayasena Turnolius Pasqual	Sri Lanka Freedom Party	Hand	10,497	22.68
Anil Moonesinghe		Key	9,932	21.46
Thomas Kulatunga		Cartwheel	196	0.42
Valid Votes			46,109	99.63
Rejected Votes			172	0.37
Total Polled			46,281	100.00
Registered Electors			53,238	
Turnout				86.93
