= S. A. Silva =

Ceylonese politician

Sampathawaduge Stephen Anthony Silva (6 July 1896 – ?) was a Ceylonese politician.

Silva was elected to parliament at the 1st parliamentary election held between 23 August 1947 and 20 September 1947, representing the Lanka Sama Samaja Party, as the member for the Agalawatte electorate. Silva received 4,135 (28% of the total vote) only 779 votes ahead of his nearest rival, D. D. Athulathmudali (UNP), who secured 22.75% of the total vote.

Silva was unsuccessful in retaining the seat of Agalawatte at the 2nd parliamentary election held between 24 May 1952 and 30 May 1952, where he was defeated by the United National Party candidate, C. W. W. Kannangara, by 7,032 votes.
