= Palindanuwara Divisional Secretariat =

- Divisional Secretariat
- Interactive map of Palindanuwara Divisional Secretariat
- Country: Sri Lanka
- Province: Western Province
- District: Kalutara District
- Time zone: UTC+5:30 (Sri Lanka Standard Time)

Palindanuwara Divisional Secretariat is a Divisional Secretariat of Kalutara District, of Western Province, Sri Lanka. Palindanuwara Divisional Secretarial Office is located in Baduraliya that is the major town in the area. As of 2006, the total registered population in this division was 32,790, which included 8,247 households. The total registered vehicles in the region were 4,506 including 118 cars, 841 motorbikes and 3199 pedalcycles (push cycles).

As of 2024, the total registered population in this division was 55,620 (male 26,841, female 28,779), which included 14,698 households.

== Demography ==
Religion in Palindanuwara DS Division (2012)
1. Buddhist (90.1%)
2. Hindu (7.40%)
3. Muslim (1.10%)
4. Roman Catholic (0.60%)
5. Other Christian (0.70%)
6. Other (0.00%)
