= Agalawatte =

Agalawatta: අගලවත්ත; அகலவத்தை
- Town
- Location within Sri Lanka
- Coordinates: 6°32′31″N 80°09′26″E
- Country: Sri Lanka
- Province: Western Province
- District: Kalutara District
- Time zone: UTC+5:30 (Sri Lanka Standard Time Zone)
- Postal Code: 12200

Agalawatta is a town in Kalutara District of Sri Lanka, and is an electoral division.

== History ==
Agalawatta is part of the Pasdun Rata (Sinhala: පස්දුන් රට), which is also known as Pasdun Korale (Sinhala: පස්දුන් කෝරලේ) (meaning: country/county of five yojanas), created when King Parakramabahu the Great drained the Kalu Ganga basin.

North of Agalawatta is the 'Fa Hien Cave', where evidence has been found dating back to 34,000 BC of Balangoda people, hunter gatherers. The Pasdun Rata was uninhabited except for hunter gatherers until the 12th century, being largely waterlogged.

The town was originally known as Angalawatta (garden of one finger's length), and was historically not very important. The town of Pelenda nearby was the site of the capital of 'King' Veediya Bandara, who rebelled against the Portuguese in the 16th century. The town of Lathpandura was the demesne of the shrine of the God Saman. There is a legend that the elephant on which Veediya Bandara was riding knelt before this shrine and that he therefore gifted Lathpandura for the upkeep of the shrine.

The constituency was originally part of electoral division Matugama until 1947. In 1960 it was itself split into the Agalawatta and Bulathsinhala electorates. It became famous as a Trotskyist fief, being lost to that party at only one election between 1947 and 1977. In this period it developed from being a road-less, school-less rural backwater into a relatively developed area.

Since 1989 it has been an electoral division of the Kalutara District, not a constituency sending a member to parliament in its own right.

== Members of Parliament ==
The constituency has been represented in Parliament by:

- Sam Silva - 1947-1952
- C. W. W. Kannangara - 1952-1956
- Anil Moonesinghe- 1956-1967
- Colvin R. de Silva - 1967-1977
- Merril Kariyawasam - 1977-1989

== Geography ==
Meegahatenna, in the south of Agalawatta, was the site of graphite mines which produced some of the highest quality graphite in the world. South of Meegahatenna is the Sinharaja forest, the only virgin rain forest in the wet zone of Sri Lanka.

The town of Pelawatta, which lies in the electoral division, has the first bridge across the Bentota River upriver from Beruwela on the coast, which became important after the Boxing Day Tsunami of 2004 made the coast road impassable.
