= Matugama =

Mathugama මතුගම மத்துகம
- Town
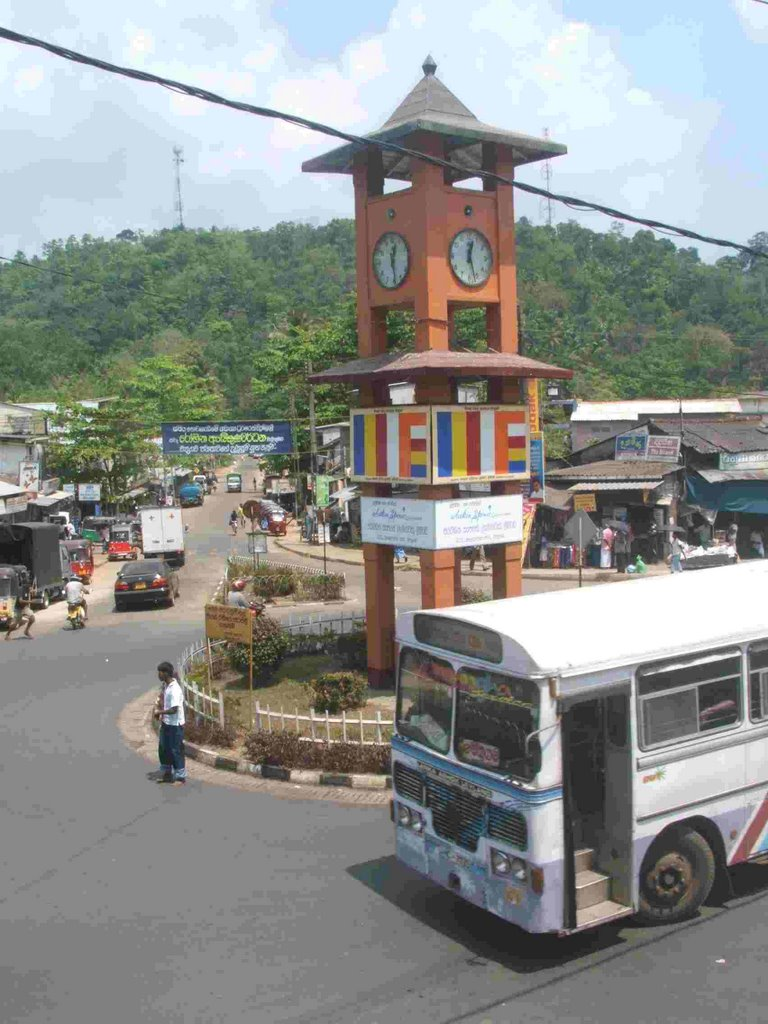

- Location within Sri Lanka
- Coordinates: 6°31′20″N 80°6′52″E
- Country: Sri Lanka
- Province: Western Province
- District: Kalutara District
- Elevation: 147 m (482 ft)
- Time zone: UTC+5:30 (Sri Lanka Standard Time Zone)
- Postal Code: 12100

Mathugama (Sinhala: මතුගම, Tamil: மத்துகம) is a semi urban town surrounded by mountains. It is an electorate of the Kalutara district, in Western Province, Sri Lanka. The town is located 64 km (40 mi) to the south of Colombo.

Mathugama is part of the Pasdun Korale (Sinhala: පස්දුන් කෝරලේ) (meaning: county of the five yojanas), created when King Parakramabahu the Great drained the Kalu Ganga basin.

In the days of the State Council it comprised the present-day Agalawatta, Bulathsinhala and Matugama constituencies.

In 1946, it was divided into two, the eastern portion becoming Agalawatta (itself subdivided in 1960 by the creation of Bulathsinhala).

Since 1989 it has been an electoral division of the Kalutara District, not a constituency sending a member to parliament in its own right.

== Members of State Council ==
The constituency was represented in the State Council by:

- D. D. Athulathmudali - 1931–1936
- C. W. W. Kannangara - 1936–1947

== Members of Parliament ==
- Wilmot A. Perera - 1947–1956
- Daya T. Pasqual - 1956–1977
- Reginald Wijegunaratne - 1977–1983
- Anil Munasinghe - 1983–1994
- Mahinda Samarasinghe - 1989 onwards
- Kumara Welgama - 1994 onwards
- Palitha Thewarapperuma - 2010 onwards

== Geography ==
Bounded by: North - Kalu Ganga river East - Bulathsinhala and Agalawatte electorates South - Bentota Ganga river West - Kalutara and Beruwala electorates.

== Climate ==
Matugama has a tropical rainforest climate (Köppen classification Af) with an average annual rainfall of about 2,931 mm (115.4 in). The wettest months coincide with the Southwest Monsoon from May through October, peaking at around 370 mm (15 in) of rainfall in October.

Temperatures range from about 26.3 °C (79.3 °F) to 27.8 °C (82.0 °F), with humidity generally between 75% and 86%. Rainfall occurs on approximately 267 days per year.

Climate data for Matugama
Month	Jan	Feb	Mar	Apr	May	Jun	Jul	Aug	Sep	Oct	Nov	Dec	Year
Mean daily maximum °C (°F)	30.3 (86.5)	30.8 (87.4)	31.3 (88.3)	31.2 (88.2)	30.5 (86.9)	29.7 (85.5)	29.3 (84.7)	29.4 (84.9)	29.5 (85.1)	29.4 (84.9)	29.3 (84.7)	29.6 (85.3)	30.0 (86.0)
Daily mean °C (°F)	26.5 (79.7)	26.8 (80.2)	27.8 (82.0)	27.9 (82.2)	27.8 (82.0)	27.3 (81.1)	26.9 (80.4)	26.9 (80.4)	26.9 (80.4)	26.8 (80.2)	26.3 (79.3)	26.4 (79.5)	27.0 (80.6)
Mean daily minimum °C (°F)	22.7 (72.9)	22.8 (73.0)	24.3 (75.7)	24.6 (76.3)	25.1 (77.2)	24.9 (76.8)	24.5 (76.1)	24.4 (75.9)	24.3 (75.7)	24.2 (75.6)	23.3 (73.9)	23.2 (73.8)	24.0 (75.2)
Average precipitation mm (inches)	89 (3.5)	75 (3.0)	147 (5.8)	247 (9.7)	348 (13.7)	224 (8.8)	185 (7.3)	187 (7.4)	257 (10.1)	370 (14.6)	318 (12.5)	151 (5.9)	2,931 (115.4)
Source: Climate-Data.org

== Schools in Matugama ==
- C. W. W. Kannangara Central College Mathugama
- Ananda Sastralaya National School Mathugama
- St. Mary's College(National school)
- D. D. Athulathmudali Vidayalaya
- E. W. Adikaram Maha Vidyalaya
- Nauththuduwa Maha Vidyalaya
- Rathnaloka College (Semi-Government)
- Leeds International school

== Transport ==
Matugama is easily accessible via the Southern Expressway (Sri Lanka). The town is located about 10 km (6.2 mi) eastward to the Dodangoda Interchange. There are two access roads from Colombo-Galle main road at Katukurunda (in Kalutara) and Aluthgama. Matugama is also accessible via Horana or Agalawatte.

Buses are the only form of public transportation in Matugama. Bus routes terminating at Matugama:

- 285 - Horana (via Bulathsinhala)
- 399 - Pitigala / Elpitiya
- 403 - Neluwa
- 408 - Aluthgama(via Yatadola)
- 428/2 - Gulawita (via Walallawita, Meegahathenna)
- 428 - Walallawita (via Meegahathenna)
- 430 - Colombo via Nagoda Kalutara
- 430/1 - Kalutara
- 431 - Kudaligama
- 433 - Agalawatte / Baduraliya / Wathugedara
- 435 - Pelawatta (via Meegahathenna, Polgampala, Agalawatte )
- 441 - Aluthgama (via Dharga Town)
- 458 - Horana (via Neboda)
- 16 - Kandy
- 16/15/87 - Jaffna
- 16/15 - Anuradapura
- 482 - Kalawana
- 437- Kelinkanda (via Molkawa, Agalawatte )
- 428/1 - Avithawa (via Walallawita)
- 965/1 - Walallawita (via Gulawita, utumgama)
- 98/5 - Akkaraipattu, Monaragala
- 99/5 - Badulla
- 18/42 - Nuwara Ealiya
- 22 - Ampara
- 4 - Puttalam
