= Puthalam =

Neighbourhood in Kanyakumari district, Tamil Nadu, India

Puththalam,
- Village
- Location in Tamil Nadu, India
- Coordinates: 8°06′32″N 77°28′00″E
- Country: India
- State: Tamil Nadu
- District: Kanyakumari

Population (2011)
  - Total: 13,073

Languages
  - Official: Tamil
- Time zone: UTC+5:30 (IST)
- Postal code: 629602
- Vehicle registration: TN-74

Puththalam is a Panchayat town in the Agastheeswaram taluk, Kanniyakumari district in the Indian state of Tamil Nadu.

It lies between the Manakudy estuary and the Indian Ocean. The estuary is famous for its biodiversity and migrating birds. The wildlife department has recently introduced mangrove plantations. Puthalam is also known for its salt pans, which have existed since the British colonial rule. The recent tsunami has devastated the surrounding fishing villages. It has a 200-year-old Christian church constructed by Ringel Taube, a German missionary. There is also a 200-year-old higher secondary school, L.M.P.C. Higher Secondary School.

== Demographics ==
As of the 2011 India census, Puththalam has a population of 13,073. Puthalam has an average literacy rate of 83.7%, higher than the state literacy rate of 80.1% (male literacy is 86.1%, and female literacy is 81.5%). About 10% of the population is under the age of six.
