= D. D. Athulathmudali =

Personal details
- Born: Don Daniel Athulathmudali; 23 February 1901 Pasdun Korale, Sri Lanka
- Died: 10 November 1958 (aged 57)
- Party: United National Party
- Children: Lalith; Sujaee; Dayanth
- Education: Ananda College, Colombo
- Occupation: Politics
- Profession: Lawyer

Don Daniel Athulathmudali (23 February 1901 – 10 November 1958) was a Ceylonese lawyer and politician.

== Biography ==
Don Daniel Athulathmudali was born on 23 February 1901 in Pasdun Korale to Don William Athulathmudali and Wijayagunawardena. He was educated at Ananda College and studied law in England and was called to the English bar in 1926.

Athulathmudali was elected to the State Council of Ceylon from Matugama on 19 June 1931 and served until 7 December 1935.

At the 1st parliamentary election held between 23 August 1947 and 20 September 1947, Athulathmudali contested the seat of Agalawatte, representing the United National Party. He lost to the Lanka Sama Samaja Party candidate, S. A. Silva by 779 votes.
