= Mumbai Climate Action Plan =

Climate Action Plan by the Maharashtra Government for Mumbai

Mumbai Climate Action Plan, a state-government initiative, was established in 2021 to tackle and solve the increasing challenges of climate change. It was officially launched in March 2022. This Planning process was unveiled by the former Environment Minister of Maharashtra, Aaditya Thackeray in September 2021 after Mumbai joined the C40 Cities Network in December 2020. This climate action plan is being drafted by the Brihanmumbai Municipal Corporation (MCGM) in assistance with World Resources Institute (WRI), a knowledge partner. This plan will serve as a 30-year roadmap and systematic framework to guide the city, Mumbai, and look climate resilience with mitigation and adaptation strategies through low-carbon, resilient, and inclusive development pathways. Being India's first climate action plan, it is aiming to set net-zero greenhouse gas emissions and green targets for 2050, twenty years before the target set by the Central Government of India at the Glasgow COP summit in 2021. The six key action areas and strategies laid out in this plan are: Sustainable Waste Management, Urban greening & biodiversity, Urban flooding & water resource management, Energy & buildings, Air quality and Sustainable Mobility.

== Timeline ==
The process of finalizing this plan was ready by November 2021 before the 2021 United Nations Climate Change Conference (COP26).

On 13 March 2022, Chief Minister of Maharashtra, Shri Uddhav Thackeray, launched and released the Mumbai Climate Action Plan virtually at the launch event in which the Environment Minister, Aditya Thackeray, Minister Sanjay Bansode, Mayor of Mumbai Kishori Pednekar, Municipal Commissioner Iqbal Singh Chahal were among those present. The plan was co-authored by Lubaina Rangawala from WRI India, C40 Cities and Saurabh Punamiya from the Government of Maharashtra

== Motivation ==
As per a research carried out by the WRI on Mumbai's vulnerability assessment, the metropolitan city will face two major climate challenges—a rise in temperature and extreme rain events which can result in massive flooding. Mumbai being one of the world's most high risk cities to climate change, as it is a densely populated city with minimal green cover and open spaces is becoming warmer. A study noted that between 1980 and 2018, Mumbai lost 40% of green cover, 81% of open land, and estimated 30% of water bodies, while on the contrary a 66% rise has been observed in built-up areas where development have been done.

Also, due to rising sea levels and Mumbai surrounded by the sea from three sides, and prone to frequent cyclonic events and storms, South Mumbai is on the verge of submerging by 2050 as warned by experts.

== Six key action areas ==
=== Sustainable Waste Management ===
A solid waste management plan is being developed to decentralize garbage at ward level. Currently there are three dumpsites in Mumbai—in Deonar, Mulund and Kanjurmarg. A study shows that estimated, Mumbai alone generates one-third of Maharashtra's total waste. As open dumpsites pose various hazards such as release of greenhouse gases, accidental hazard caused by fire, air and water contamination, pest and rodent issues etc. Therefore this centralized method has to be gone away with and decentralized methods are needful for future waste generation in which waste generation can be minimized and value can be created out of waste in the form of composting, recycling, energy recovery to meet the city's demand for sustainable waste management. This plan will come up with a strategy to decentralize Mumbai's waste management system with unit-level processing of organic waste to create valuable compost, appointing committed ward-level waste officers and coordination of relevant stakeholders with the Municipal Corporation of Greater Mumbai's (MCGM) Waste management department and the Maharashtra Pollution Control Board (MPCB). The BMC has also mandated wet waste process and solid waste process mandatory to the bulk generators to provide treatment at source if it has area greater than 5,000 sq. m.

=== Urban Greening and Biodiversity ===
A study presented that low income areas in Mumbai are found to be with less green cover. Areas like Dongri, Bhuleshwar which comes in Ward B and C, are warmer than other areas. The Mumbai Climate Action Plan will emphasize the need to increase the green cover and biodiversity of the city in a planned and inclusive manner. The four plans suggested are Heat resilience and carbon sequestration, Flood mitigation, Access to open spaces, Improved Biodiversity.

=== Urban Flooding and Water Resource Management ===
The MCAP will focus on how to prevent or reduce flooding and waterlogging while also dealing with the lack of safe and affordable drinking water. Mumbai is highly prone to coastal risks due to storms, cyclones and also faces extreme rainfall during monsoons, leading to frequent flooding in low-lying areas. The climate action plan is aiming at building flood-resilient infrastructure in the city by improving early warning systems, and drainage lines. It also promotes on framing policies that will promote the reuse of water through measures like increased percolation and rainwater harvesting.

=== Energy and Buildings ===
The key priorities include incorporating 50% Renewables in Mumbai's electricity generation mix, assessing the potential for rooftop solar on buildings and promoting it, 100% energy efficient street and public lightings and energy-efficient or low-carbon technology for utility energy consumption like WTPs, STPs etc. An additional focus is on prioritizing energy-efficient materials for building construction, transition to energy efficient building lightings and cooling equipment, to use clean fuel in cooking and promoting electric stove, to promote thermal comfort design and climate resilient affordable housing.

=== Air Quality ===
As key priority action areas for the next 10–20 years for efficient air quality management in Mumbai, emphasis has been laid to shift towards cleaner fuels, fuel efficiency and adoption of electric vehicles to reduce vehicular and industrial emissions, indoor air pollution and emissions from bakeries and crematoriums. Strict regulation and appropriate enforcement mechanism of policies and rules have also been prioritized to minimize the indiscriminate burning of waste, burning at landfill sites and release of suspension dust due to construction and demolition activities.

=== Sustainable Mobility ===
Building upon Mumbai's extensive public transport network, multimodal integration and equitable access and affordability for women, children and low income groups were identified are key priorities. With Mumbai being the second most congested city in the world, parking management and safer intersections need to be prioritized along with inclusive pedestrian and cycling infrastructure for reduced congestion, commuter safety and better air quality. With less than 1% electric vehicles in the mix, incentives and policies to shift towards 100% zero emission vehicles by 2050 for passenger and freight modes is a key priority for reducing GHG emissions as well as improving air quality.

== Execution ==
After introducing the plan, thousands of hectares of mangroves under protected status are being brought to Mumbai, thousands more trees are being planted, and the government continues to introduce nature-based solutions to help tackle air pollution, reduce landslides, and cool down the city in the face of extreme heat.
