= Veediya Bandara =

Veediya Bandara; වීදිය බණ්ඩාර
- Commander-in-Chief of Kotte Kingdom
- Spouse: Samudra Devi; Suriya Devi
- Issue: King Dharmapala of Kotte; Prince Vijayapala; Prince Suriyabandara
- House: Malala-Irugal
- Father: Kumara Bandara
- Mother: Samudra Devi of Madampe alias Princess Kapuru Lamaethana

Veediya Bandara (Sinhala: වීදිය බණ්ඩාර) was the commander-in-chief of the Kingdom of Kotte, Sri Lanka, during the reign of Bhuvanaikabahu VII of Kotte (1521–1551). He was a gifted warrior and widely regarded as one of the greatest generals of Sri Lankan history. Well known for his prowess of warfare, he was the central figure of the Kotte army, in a series of relentless wars against King Mayadunne of Sitawaka and occasionally, against the Portuguese. Being impetuous by nature, he got himself involved in many scandals, including the murder of his wife, Samudra Deviya (සමුද්‍ර දේවි), the daughter of his king.

== Background ==
At the time of his birth and during his youth in early 16th century, several parties were struggling for the supremacy of the island of Sri Lanka. Chief among them were King Bhuvanekabahu VII, his younger brother Mayadunne, the ruler of Sithawaka and the Portuguese, who were starting to establish themselves along the western coast of Sri Lanka. In addition, the central and northern parts of the island were also governed by regional rulers.

=== Birth ===
Veediya Bandara was born to a family of nobility. His father was a local lord of royal descent( Malala-Irugal) called Kumara Bandara (කුමාර බණ්ඩාර) who ruled Kalutara to Maggona. Prince Raigam Bandara (elder brother to Mayadunne and younger brother to Bhuvanekabahu) took most of all Kalutara after the mutiny (Vijayabaa Kollaya) against his own father. His mother was a cousin of King Bhuvanekabahu (granddaughter of Parakramabahu VIII, daughter of King Sakalakala Wallabha). From a very early age, he had access to the royal courts and there, he and the king's daughter, Samudra Deviya, were said to have developed a deep affection towards each other, that would later trigger a catastrophic chain of events.

== Marriage ==
Despite his noble birth and unparalleled skills at arms, King Bhuvanekabahu did not approve the union of Veediya Bandara and his daughter. Instead, he preferred another prince, Jayo Bandara, to take the hand of his daughter. Jayo Bandara was also a chivalrous youth of noble birth, whom the king regarded as the son he never had. Outraged by the notion of losing his love, Veediya Bandara went on to challenge Jayo Bandara to a dual for her hand. Although an accomplished fighter himself, Jayo Bandara was no match for the brute strength and the skill of Veediya Bandara. The duel ended up in the defeat and death of Jayo Bandara and it wasn't long before Veediya Bandara realising the enormity of his actions fled Kotte. Without both the princes the royal army was leaderless and with the threat of his brother Mayadunne looming, King Bhuvanekabahu had no option but to pardon Veediya Bandara, appoint him as the leader of the army and wed him to his daughter.

Even though their marriage produced a son named Dharmapala in 1541, it did not prove to be a long lasting one. While Veediya Bandara was away crushing a rebellion, a rumor was spread involving Samudra Deviya and a Portuguese officer at the royal court. While several sources suggest that there was little substance to the rumor, the complete truth remains unknown. The truth of the matter, however, did not concern Veediya Bandara. His was an honour of unbendable kind as he deemed the damage done was beyond repair. He took his wife to a walk on the banks of Diyawanna lake and in a moment of madness, confessed his intentions to take her life for her alleged crime. According to legend he wept at the water's edge, as the lifeless body of his loving wife, one of the renowned beauties of her time, was floating on the lake.

== Military campaigns ==
Veediya Bandara and his deputy commander, Vijayakoon Mudaliya, who was the ‘bangai-rala’, better known as Vijayakumara, Velayuda Arachchi, Bodhiraja Perumal of Hiti-Imbula and Varusapperuma Arachchi and personal Maggona Arachchi, Commander of Personal Bodyguards to the Veediya Bandara (sworn to protect Veediya Bandara and his family by birth), led the army of Kotte to victory in numerous battles against King Mayadunne and later against his son, Rajasinha I. Once, in the early stages of this rivalry, he annihilated the army of Sithawaka that was strengthened by an alliance with a South Indian state. After the battle, he laid waste to Sithawaka and put the royal palace to torch. When Mayadunne sued for peace, King Bhuvanekabahu, upon Veediya Bandara's insistence, demanded the heads of the two South Indian commanders who had dared to invade Kotte.

Veediya Bandara had to put down many rebellions in various parts of the country that kept him constantly out of the capital. He often made short work of them, yet, this situation presented his greater enemies with an opportunity. Knowing Veediya Bandara's absence, Mayadunne prepared to attack Kotte with the ruler of Kandy as his ally. When the words reached Veediya Bandara in Uva, he made haste and descended upon the army of Kandy before it joined forces with Mayadunne. Afterwards, his army invaded and captured Sithawaka again as Mayadunne fled without a fight. This, however, was a ruse. Secretly deployed forces attacked Veediya Bandara's men and took them by complete surprise. Unprepared and outnumbered, they endured a heavy defeat for the misjudgment of their leader. Veediya Bandara himself, retreated with several of his guards only to be betrayed by them as there was a hefty price on his head while Velayuda Arachchi fighting alone with enemies for make time to fall back his Master and Friends of Commanders . It is said that they were 50 men's of Kotte Army fighting Veediya Bandara for get hefty price and Maggona Arachchi fight till his death to protect his master ( Veediya Bandara), when Tikiri Bandara Rajasinha, son of Mayadunne arrived there with a force. Rather than facing certain death, Veediya Bandara ordered Vijayakoon Mudaliya, Bodhiraja Perumal of Hiti-Imbula and Varusapperuma Arachchi to flee to Kotte and wait for his Orders but they refuse and then Veediya Bandara was angry and re - ordered to fall back and carry the Dead Body of his loyal commander of Personal Bodyguard, Maggona Arachchi (he was the childhood friend to Veediya Bandara) and then decided to surrender to prince Rajasinha who in time, distinguished himself as a warrior king.

After his capture, Veediya Bandara was imprisoned in Sithawaka for some time, though, he was able to escape from his prison miraculously, and found his way back to Kotte. Sources claim that Veediya Bandara was aided in his escape by Suriya Deviya, the daughter of Mayadunne, whom had fallen in love with him. Soon after, he saw to it that the debt was paid, when he took Suriya Deviya as his new bride.

After the tragic death of king Bhuvanaikabahu VII, his grandson (and the son of Veediya Bandara's first marriage), Dharmapala, ascended the throne of Kotte. As his regent, Veediya Bandara assumed the governance of the kingdom. Being an opponent of the Portuguese from the start, he decided to prevent the expansion of Christianity in Kotte. This, along with several other matters, caused his relationship with the Portuguese to decline (which was not a promising one at any stage) to a point that saw him arrested and taken prisoner by the colonialists. He was held inside the fort of Colombo to be taken away for a trial in Goa, when his wife rescued him again by having a tunnel dug underneath the walls of the fort.

== See also ==
- List of Sinhalese monarchs
- Wijayaba Kollaya
