= Wilmot A. Perera =

Sri Lankan statesman and philanthropist

Hon. Wilmot A. Perera
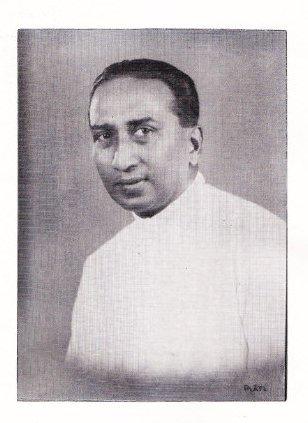

Ceylonese Ambassador to China
- In office 1957–1958
- Preceded by: None
- Succeeded by: William Gopallawa

Member of Parliament for Matugama
- In office 20 September 1947 – 10 April 1956

Personal details
- Born: 1905 June 12
- Died: 1973
- Party: Viplavakari Lanka Sama Samaja Party
- Other political affiliations: Lanka Sama Samaja Party
- Spouse: Esme Perera Abeywardena
- Relations: Grand Children: Desala Peiris, Ishita Peiris, Shaminda Perera, Sharanka Perera, Niranka Perera
- Children: Enoka and Ajit
- Education: Royal College, Colombo
- Occupation: Planter

Wilmot Abraham Perera (1905–1973) was a Sri Lankan statesman and philanthropist. He was declared a National Hero in 1993. A member of parliament, he was Ceylon's first Ambassador to China.

== Early life and education ==
Born in Panadura to M. Abraham Perera, a wealthy landowner, widely known as the "Rubber King". His maternal grandparents were Jeramias Dias and Celestina Dias, who founded Visakha Vidyalaya. Perera was educated initially at St. John's College Panadura and later at the Royal College, Colombo.

== Social service and philanthropy ==
He became a planter, taking over the management of his family plantations. He became active in his home area, establishing the first rural development society in Raigam Korale. He went on to establish Sri Palee College in Horana, based on the Rabindranath Tagore's Shantiniketan in 1934. The foundation stone was laid by Tagore on 20 May 1934 on his last visit to Ceylon. The Sri Palee Trust was established by him to manage the lands gifted by him. After his death, part of this property comprising many buildings was donated to the University of Ceylon by his family, in his memory in 1976. This later became the Sri Palee Campus of the University of Colombo. After his death, his ancestral home in Panadura was handed over to the Sri Sumangala Girls' School.

== Political career ==
The Suriya-Mal Movement was inaugurated at his residence in 1933. In 1935 he became a founding member of the Lanka Sama Samaja Party, becoming active politics and the Sri Lankan independence movement. He contested the 1947 general election from the Matugama electorate as an Independent Socialist, defeating the "father of free education" C.W.W. Kannangara and was elected to the first Parliament of Ceylon. He was re-elected in the 1952 general election from the Viplavakari Lanka Sama Samaja Party, defeating D. D. Athulathmudali. He was a member of the Viplavakari Lanka Sama Samaja Party for a short while.

He was appointed as the first Ceylonese Ambassador to China in 1957 when Ceylon established diplomatic ties with the People's Republic of China and served till 1960, when he was succeeded by William Gopallawa. In 1961 he was appointed to head the first Salaries and Cadres Commission (known thereafter as the Wilmot A. Perera Commission). He also served as the Chairman of the Commission for Higher Education.

== Family ==
He was married to Esme Perera Abeywardena, a grand daughter of the late Sir Charles Henry de Soysa, Sri Lanka's foremost Philanthropist. They had two children, a daughter Enoka and son Ajit.

== Gallery ==
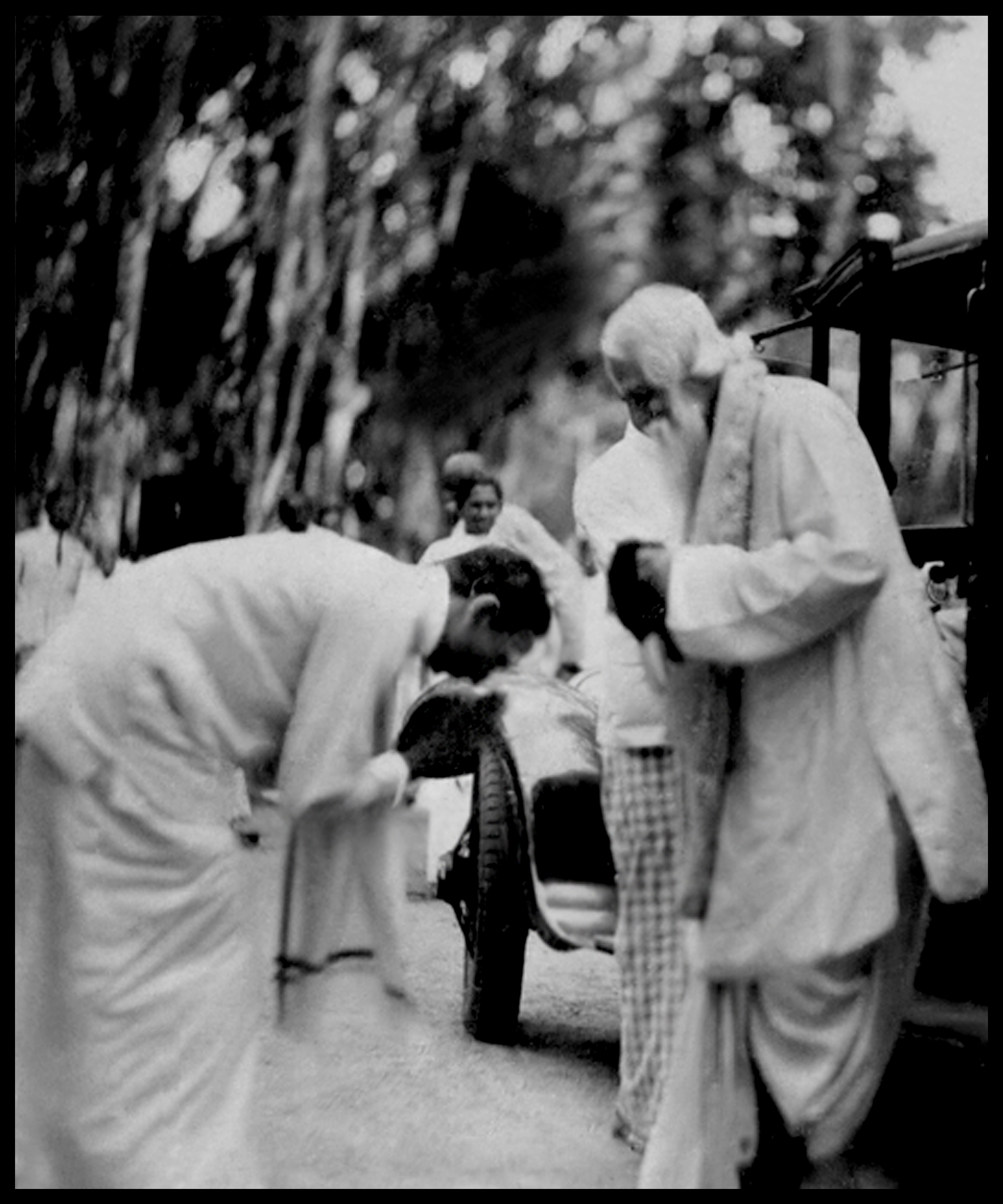
Wilmot A Perera greeting Rabindranath Tagore when he arrived to lay the foundation stone to Sri Palee, on 20 May 1934.

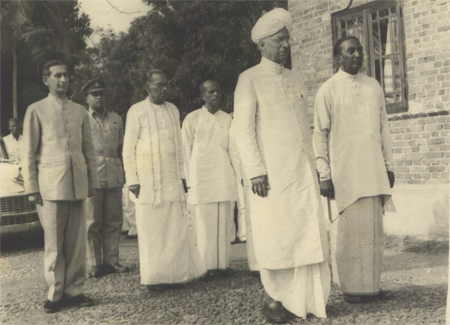
Wilmot A. Perera with Hon. S.W.R.D. Bandaranaike PM & Sir Swarvapali Radhakrishan, Pres. of India during a visit to Sri Palee

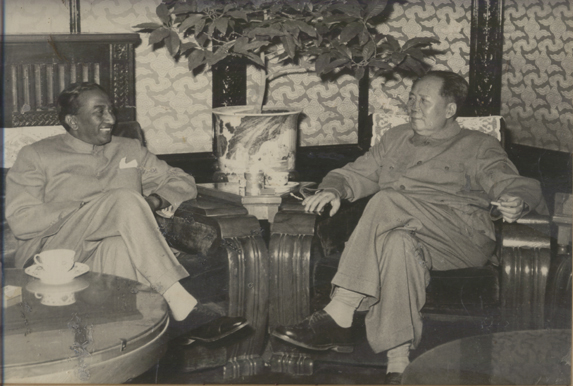
Wilmot A. Perera presenting his credentials to Chairman Mao as Ceylon's 1st Ambassador

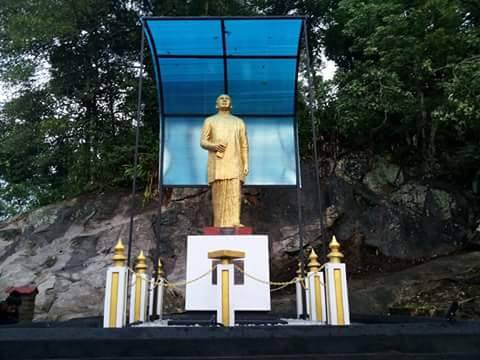
Wilmot A Perera Statue, Sri Palee Campus

== See also ==
- Sri Palee Campus
- Sri Palee College
- Sri Lankan Non Career Diplomats

Diplomatic posts
Preceded by New Post	Ceylonese Ambassador to China; 1957–1960	Succeeded by William Gopallawa
