= Horana =

Horana හොරණ ஹொரணை
- Interactive map of Horana
- Coordinates: 6°43′N 80°03′E
- Country: Sri Lanka
- Province: Western Province
- District: Kalutara District

Area
  - Land: 110 km^{2} (42 sq mi)
- Time zone: UTC+5:30 (Sri Lanka Standard Time)
- Website: http://www.horanacity.com

Horana (Sinhala: හොරණ, Tamil: ஹொரணை) is a city administered by an Urban Council in the Kalutara District of the Western Province, Sri Lanka. It is situated along the A8 highway between Panadura and Ratnapura, approximately 18 kilometres (11 mi) from Panadura and 50 kilometres (31 mi) from Ratnapura. Horana is also connected to Colombo via the B84 Colombo–Horana Road, at a distance of about 42 kilometres (26 mi).

Horana is the hometown of former Prime Minister of Sri Lanka Ratnasiri Wickremanayake.

== Zone ==
- Ingiriya
- Gonapola
- Neboda
- Govinna
- Galanigama
- Thalagala
- Handapangoda
- Pokunuwita
- Ballapitiya
- Kahathuduwa
- Moragahahena

== Demographics ==
According to the 2012 national census, the Horana Divisional Secretariat Division is predominantly Sinhala Buddhist, with minority Hindu, Christian, and Muslim communities."Census of Population and Housing 2012". Department of Census and Statistics Sri Lanka.

== Etymology ==
The name Horana is derived from the Hora tree, which historically grew in significant numbers in the area.

== Economy ==
Horana is an important industrial centre within Kalutara District, largely due to the presence of the Horana Export Processing Zone, which operates under the Board of Investment of Sri Lanka. The zone hosts export-oriented manufacturing industries and contributes significantly to regional employment."Horana Export Processing Zone Profile". Board of Investment of Sri Lanka.

In recent years, infrastructure development initiatives have been undertaken at the Horana Export Processing Zone to improve industrial efficiency and sustainability."BOI invests Rs. 763 Mn in Horana EPZ". Board of Investment of Sri Lanka.

Expressway Access: Connected to the Southern Expressway (E01) via the Kahathuduwa interchange (via the B84 road) and the Gelanigama interchange (via the A8 road).

== Education ==
The Horana Educational Zone is the 2nd largest educational zone in the Kalutara District by geographical area and number of schools.

Horana serves as an educational centre in the district and is home to several prominent secondary schools, including

- Sri Palee College,
- Royal College of Horana,
- Taxila Central College,
- Taxila Junior College (Near Clock Tower),
- Taxila Primary - Kulupana,
- Taxila Maha Vidyalaya (Near Police Station)
- Ashok College Private School,
- Brightwood International School
- Sussex International College,
- Leeds International School,
- Vidyarathana University College,
- Horana Tamil Maha Vidyalaya,
- Southland College International,
- Cambridge College Of British International,
- Don Pedric Maha Vidyalaya,
- Sri Medankara Maha Vidyalaya,
- Prajapathi Balika Vidyalaya.

"Horana Schools". horana.ds.gov.lk.

The Sri Palee Campus of the University of Colombo is located in Horana. Established in 1996, the campus comprises the Faculty of Performing Arts and the Faculty of Mass Media and was developed on land donated by the Sri Palee Trust founded by philanthropist Wilmot A. Perera."Sri Palee Campus". Wikipedia.
