= Politics of Sri Lanka =

- National Emblem of Sri Lanka
- Polity type: Unitary multi-party semi-presidential representative democratic republic
- Constitution: Constitution of Sri Lanka

Legislative branch
- Name: Parliament
- Type: Unicameral
- Meeting place: Sri Lanka Parliament
- Presiding officer: Jagath Wickramaratne, Speaker of the Parliament of Sri Lanka

Executive branch
- Head of state
- Title: President
- Currently: Anura Kumara Dissanayake
- Appointer: Direct election
- Head of government
- Title: Prime Minister
- Currently: Harini Amarasuriya
- Appointer: President
- Cabinet
- Name: Cabinet of Sri Lanka
- Current cabinet: Dissanayake cabinet
- Leader: President
- Appointer: President
- Ministries: 29

Judicial branch
- Name: Judiciary
- Supreme Court
- Chief judge: Murdu Fernando

Sri Lanka is a unitary multi-party semi-presidential representative democratic republic, whereby the President of Sri Lanka is both head of state and head of government. Executive power is exercised by the President on the advice of the Prime Minister and the Cabinet of Ministers. Legislative power is vested in the Parliament. The judiciary is independent of the executive and the legislature.

Starting from the early 1950s, the two main parties of Sri Lanka were the social democratic Sri Lanka Freedom Party and the liberal conservative United National Party for several decades. Recently, however, the influence of the two parties has diminished significantly; currently, the two main parties are the National People's Power, a left-wing alliance led by the Janatha Vimukthi Peramuna, and the Samagi Jana Balawegaya, which split from the UNP in 2020. Other notable parties include the Sri Lanka Podujana Peramuna, the Ilankai Tamil Arasu Kachchi, and the Sri Lanka Muslim Congress.

The Economist Intelligence Unit rated Sri Lanka a "flawed democracy" in 2022.

== Executive branch ==
Main office-holders
Office	Name	Party	Since
President	Anura Kumara Dissanayake	National People's Power	23 September 2024
Prime Minister	Harini Amarasuriya	National People's Power	24 September 2024

The president, directly elected for a five-year term, is the head of state, head of government, and commander-in-chief of the armed forces. The election occurs under the Sri Lankan form of the contingent vote. Responsible to Parliament for the exercise of duties under the constitution and laws, the president may be removed from office by a two-thirds vote of Parliament with the concurrence of the Supreme Court.

The president appoints and heads a cabinet of ministers responsible to Parliament. The president's deputy is the prime minister, who leads the ruling party in Parliament. A parliamentary no-confidence vote requires dissolution of the cabinet and the appointment of a new one by the President.

== Legislative branch ==
The Parliament has 225 members, elected for a five-year term: 196 members elected in multi-seat constituencies and 29 by proportional representation.

The primary modification is that the party that receives the largest number of valid votes in each constituency gains a unique "bonus seat" (see Hickman, 1999). The president may summon, suspend, or end a legislative session and can dissolve Parliament at any time once a year has passed since the last general elections (except in a few limited circumstances). The President can also dissolve Parliament before the completion of one year, if requested to do so by a resolution signed by at least half the MPs. Parliament reserves the power to make all laws. Since its independence in 1948, Sri Lanka has remained a member of the Commonwealth of Nations.

== Political parties and elections ==
In August 2005, the Supreme Court ruled that presidential elections would be held in November 2005, resolving a long-running dispute on the length of President Kumaratunga's term. Prime Minister Mahinda Rajapaksa was nominated the SLFP candidate and former Prime Minister Ranil Wickremesinghe as the UNP candidate. The election was held on 17 November 2005, and Mahinda Rajapaksa was elected the 5th Executive President of Sri Lanka winning 50.3% of valid votes, compared to Ranil Wickramasinghe's 48.4%. Mahinda Rajapaksa took oath as president on 19 November 2005. Ratnasiri Wickramanayake was appointed the 22nd Prime Minister on 21 November 2005, to fill the post vacated by Mahinda Rajapaksa. He was previously Prime Minister from 2000 until 2001.

President Mahinda Rajapaksa lost the 2015 presidential elections, ending his ten-year presidency. However, his successor, President Maithripala Sirisena, decided not to seek re-election in 2019. This enabled the Rajapaksa family to regain power in the 2019 presidential elections. Mahinda Rajapaksa's younger brother and former wartime defence chief Gotabaya Rajapaksa won the election, and was sworn in as the 7th Executive President of Sri Lanka. The Rajapaksa's firm grip of power consolidated in the parliamentary elections held in August 2020. The family's political party, the Sri Lanka Podujana Peramuna (known by its initials SLPP) won a landslide victory and a clear majority in the parliament, and five members of the Rajapaksa family won a seat in the parliament. Former President Mahinda Rajapaksa became the new prime minister.

On 23 September 2024, Anura Kumara Dissanayake was sworn in as Sri Lanka's new president after winning the presidential election as a left-wing candidate. On 14 November 2024, President Anura Kumara Dissanayake's National People's Power (NPP), a left-leaning alliance, received a two-thirds majority in parliament in Sri Lankan parliamentary election.

=== 2024 presidential election ===
Candidate	Party	First preference		Total votes	
Candidate	Party	Votes	%	Votes	%
Anura Kumara Dissanayake	National People's Power	5,634,915	42.31	5,740,179	55.89
Sajith Premadasa	Samagi Jana Balawegaya	4,363,035	32.76	4,530,902	44.11
Ranil Wickremesinghe	Independent (Note: Member of the United National Party officially running as independent, endorsed by the UNP and SLPP breakaway faction)	2,299,767	17.27		
Namal Rajapaksa	Sri Lanka Podujana Peramuna	342,781	2.57		
P. Ariyanethiran	Independent	226,343	1.70		
Dilith Jayaweera	Communist Party of Sri Lanka	122,396	0.92		
K. K. Piyadasa	Independent	47,543	0.36		
D. M. Bandaranayake	Independent	30,660	0.23		
Sarath Fonseka	Independent	22,407	0.17		
Wijeyadasa Rajapakshe	National Democratic Front	21,306	0.16		
Anuruddha Polgampola	Independent	15,411	0.12		
Sarath Keerthirathne	Independent	15,187	0.11		
K. R. Krishan	Arunalu People's Front	13,595	0.10		
Suranjeewa Anoj de Silva	Democratic United National Front	12,898	0.10		
Priyantha Wickremesinghe	Nava Sama Samaja Party	12,760	0.10		
Namal Rajapaksha	Samabima Party	12,700	0.10		
Akmeemana Dayarathana Thero	Independent	11,536	0.09		
Nuwan Bopege	Socialist People's Forum	11,191	0.08		
Ajantha de Zoyza	Ruhunu People's Party	10,548	0.08		
Victor Anthony Perera	Independent	10,374	0.08		
Siripala Amarasinghe	Independent	9,035	0.07		
Siritunga Jayasuriya	United Socialist Party	8,954	0.07		
Battaramulle Seelarathana Thero	People's Welfare Front	6,839	0.05		
Abubakar Mohamed Infaz	Democratic Unity Alliance	6,531	0.05		
Pemasiri Manage	Independent	5,822	0.04		
Mahinda Dewage	Socialist Party of Sri Lanka	5,338	0.04		
Keerthi Wickremeratne	Our People's Power Party	4,676	0.04		
Pani Wijesiriwardena	Socialist Equality Party	4,410	0.03		
Oshala Herath	New Independent Front	4,253	0.03		
Roshan Ranasinghe	Independent	4,205	0.03		
P. W. S. K. Bandaranayake	National Development Front	4,070	0.03		
Ananda Kularatne	Independent	4,013	0.03		
Lalith de Silva	United National Freedom Front	3,004	0.02		
Sidney Jayarathna	Independent	2,799	0.02		
Janaka Ratnayake	United Lanka People's Party	2,405	0.02		
M. Thilakarajah	Independent	2,138	0.02		
Sarath Manamendra	New Sinhala Heritage	1,911	0.01		
A. S. P. Liyanage	Sri Lanka Labour Party	1,860	0.01		
Total		13,319,616	100.00	10,271,081	100.00
Valid votes		13,319,616	97.80	10,271,081	75.41
Invalid/blank votes		300,300	2.20	3,348,835	24.59
Total votes		13,619,916	100.00	13,619,916	100.00
Registered voters/turnout		17,140,354	79.46	17,140,354	79.46
Source: Election Commission of Sri Lanka

=== National ===
Party	Votes	%	Seats			
Party	Votes	%	District	National	Total	±
National People's Power (Note: Including the Janatha Vimukthi Peramuna.)	6,863,186	61.56	141	18	159	+156
Samagi Jana Balawegaya (Note: Alliance consisting of the All Ceylon Makkal Congress (which contested separately in one district, Ampara), the Freedom People's Congress, the Samagi Jana Balawegaya, the Sri Lanka Freedom Party (Dayasiri wing), the Sri Lanka Muslim Congress (which contested separately in two districts, Ampara and Batticaloa), and the Tamil Progressive Alliance (consisting of the National Union of Workers, the United Progressive Alliance, the Democratic People's Front and the Up-Country People's Front).)	1,968,716	17.66	35	5	40	−14
New Democratic Front (Note: Alliance consisting of the Ceylon Workers' Congress (which contested under the symbol of the United National Party in Nuwara Eliya), the Mahajana Eksath Peramuna, the National Unity Alliance, the National Congress, the New Lanka Freedom Party, the Sri Lanka Freedom Party (Nimal wing), the Sri Lanka Mahajana Pakshaya, the Sri Lanka Podujana Peramuna (pro-Ranil wing), and the United National Party.)	500,835	4.49	3	2	5	+5
Sri Lanka Podujana Peramuna	350,429	3.14	2	1	3	−97
Ilankai Tamil Arasu Kachchi	257,813	2.31	7	1	8	New
Sarvajana Balaya (Note: Alliance consisting of the Communist Party of Sri Lanka, the Independent MPs Forum, the Mawbima Janatha Pakshaya and the Pivithuru Hela Urumaya.)	178,006	1.60	0	1	1	+1
Sri Lanka Muslim Congress	87,038	0.78	2	1	3	+2
United Democratic Voice	83,488	0.75	0	0	0	New
United National Party	66,234	0.59	1	0	1	0
Democratic Tamil National Alliance (Note: Alliance consisting of the Eelam People's Revolutionary Liberation Front, the People's Liberation Organisation of Tamil Eelam and the Tamil Eelam Liberation Organization.)	65,382	0.59	1	0	1	New
Democratic Left Front	50,836	0.46	0	0	0	0
Democratic National Alliance	45,419	0.41	0	0	0	New
Tamil National People's Front (Note: The Tamil National People's Front contested under the name and symbol of the All Ceylon Tamil Congress.)	39,894	0.36	1	0	1	0
Tamil Makkal Viduthalai Pulikal	34,440	0.31	0	0	0	−1
All Ceylon Makkal Congress	33,911	0.30	1	0	1	0
People's Struggle Alliance (Note: Alliance consisting of the Frontline Socialist Party and the New Democratic Marxist–Leninist Party.)	29,611	0.27	0	0	0	0
Eelam People's Democratic Party	28,985	0.26	0	0	0	−2
Jaffna – Independent Group 17	30,637	0.27	1	0	1	+1
National Democratic Front	25,444	0.23	0	0	0	0
United National Alliance	22,548	0.20	0	0	0	New
Sri Lanka Labour Party	17,710	0.16	1	0	1	+1
Devana Parapura	16,950	0.15	0	0	0	New
Thamizh Makkal Koottani	13,295	0.12	0	0	0	New
Janasetha Peramuna	12,743	0.11	0	0	0	0
National Front for Good Governance	8,447	0.08	0	0	0	New
United National Freedom Front	7,796	0.07	0	0	0	New
Arunalu People's Front	7,666	0.07	0	0	0	New
New Independent Front	7,182	0.06	0	0	0	New
National People's Party	6,307	0.06	0	0	0	0
Our Power of People's Party	6,043	0.05	0	0	0	−1
Tamil United Liberation Front	5,061	0.05	0	0	0	0
Democratic United National Front	4,480	0.04	0	0	0	0
Samabima Party	4,449	0.04	0	0	0	New
Patriotic People's Power	3,985	0.04	0	0	0	New
Eros Democratic Front	2,865	0.03	0	0	0	New
Democratic Unity Alliance	2,198	0.02	0	0	0	0
Socialist Party of Sri Lanka	2,087	0.02	0	0	0	0
Jathika Sangwardhena Peramuna	1,920	0.02	0	0	0	0
United Socialist Party	1,838	0.02	0	0	0	0
Socialist Equality Party	864	0.01	0	0	0	0
Freedom People's Front	841	0.01	0	0	0	New
United Peace Alliance	822	0.01	0	0	0	0
Lanka Janatha Party	759	0.01	0	0	0	New
United Lanka People's Party	659	0.01	0	0	0	New
Liberal Democratic Party	635	0.01	0	0	0	New
New Lanka Freedom Party	601	0.01	0	0	0	New
Nava Sama Samaja Party	491	0.00	0	0	0	New
All Ceylon Tamil Mahasabha	450	0.00	0	0	0	0
Democratic Party	283	0.00	0	0	0	New
Sri Lanka Mahajana Pakshaya	269	0.00	0	0	0	New
Independents	245,458	2.20	0	0	0	0
Total	11,148,006	100.00	196	29	225	0
Valid votes	11,148,006	94.35				
Invalid/blank votes	667,240	5.65				
Total votes	11,815,246	100.00				
Registered voters/turnout	17,140,354	68.93				
Source: Election Commission of Sri Lanka

== Administrative divisions ==
The local government is divided into two parallel structures, the civil service, which dates back to colonial times, and the provincial councils, established in 1987.

=== Civil Service structure ===
The country is divided into 25 districts, each of which has a district secretary (the government agent or GA) who is appointed. Each district has 5–16 divisions, each with a divisional secretary who is also appointed. At a village level, Grama Niladari (Village Officers), Samurdhi Niladari (Development Officers) and agriculture extension officers all work for their respective divisional secretaries.

=== Provincial Council structure ===
Under the Indo-Sri Lanka Accord signed in 1987 and the subsequent 13th Amendment to the Constitution, the Government of Sri Lanka agreed to devolve some authority to the provinces. Provincial councils are directly elected for five-year terms. The leader of the council majority serves as the province's Chief Minister with a board of ministers; a provincial governor is appointed by the president.

The Provincial Councils have full statute making power with respect to the Provincial Council List, and shared statute making power respect to the Concurrent List. While all matters set out in the Reserved List are under the central government.

Despite the existence of the 13th amendment, provincial council elections have not been held since 2014.

=== Local government structure ===
Below the provincial level are elected Municipal Councils and Urban Councils, responsible for municipalities and cities respectively, and below this level Pradeshiya Sabhas (village councils), again elected. There are 24 Municipal Councils, 41 Urban Councils and 276 Pradeshiya Sabhas.

== Judicial branch ==
Sri Lanka's judiciary consists of a Supreme Court, Court of Appeal, High Court, and a number of subordinate courts. Sri Lanka's legal system is reflective of the country's diverse cultural influences. Criminal law is fundamentally British. Basic civil law is Roman-Dutch, but laws pertaining to marriage, divorce, and inheritance are communal, known as respectively as Kandyan, Thesavalamai (Jaffna Tamil) and Muslim (Roman-Dutch law applies to Low-country Sinhalese, Estate Tamils and others).

Courts of law

- Supreme Court of Sri Lanka
- Court of Appeal of Sri Lanka
- High Court of Sri Lanka
- District Courts
- Magistrate's Courts
- Primary Courts

== Foreign relations of Sri Lanka ==
Sri Lanka generally follows a non-aligned foreign policy but has been seeking closer relations with the United States since 1977. It participates in multilateral diplomacy, particularly at the United Nations, where it seeks to promote sovereignty, independence, and development in the developing world. Sri Lanka was a founding member of the Non-Aligned Movement (NAM). It also is a member of the Commonwealth, the South Asian Association for Regional Cooperation (SAARC), the World Bank, International Monetary Fund, Asian Development Bank, and the Colombo Plan. Sri Lanka continues its active participation in the NAM, while also stressing the importance it places on regionalism by playing a strong role in SAARC.

Sri Lanka is member of the IAEA, IBRD, ADB, C, CP, ESCAP, FAO, G-24, G-77, ICAO, ICRM, IDA, IFAD, IFC, IFRCS, IHO, ILO, IMF, IMO, Inmarsat, Intelsat, Interpol, IOC, IOM, ISO, ITU, NAM, OAS (observer), OPCW, PCA, SAARC, UN, UNCTAD, UNESCO, UNIDO, UNU, UPU, WCL, WCO, WFTU, WHO, WIPO, WMO, WToO, and WTrO.

The growing interest of other countries in making their claims to Sri Lanka's strategic assets has been generating heated discussion both within national and international circles. China, India and Japan's involvement in Sri Lankan seaport developments is a direct consequence of the ongoing tussle among the three nations to establish a firm foothold in the strategically located island state.

== Political pressure groups ==
Civil society participation in decision-making and opinion-shaping in Sri Lanka is very poor. Professionals, civil society groups, and media rarely play significant roles in Sri Lankan politics, and as a result many aspects of the lives of ordinary citizens are politicized. In addition, the vacuum created by the silence and inactivity of civil society has led to radical groups such as ethnic/religious-based groups, trade unions and NGOs assuming lead roles as political pressure groups.

== See also ==
- List of rulers of Ceylon
- List of presidents of Sri Lanka
- List of prime ministers of Sri Lanka
- Leftist parties in Sri Lanka

== Sources ==
- Hickman, J. 1999. "Explaining the Two-Party System in Sri Lanka's National Assembly." Contemporary South Asia, Volume 8, Number 1 (March), pp. 29–40 (A detailed description of the effects of the bonus seat provision).
- James Jupp, Sri Lanka: Third World Democracy, London: Frank Cass and Company, Limited, 1978.
