= 2024 Sri Lankan presidential election =

- 21 September 2024
- Registered: 17,140,354
- Turnout: 79.46% (▼4.26pp)
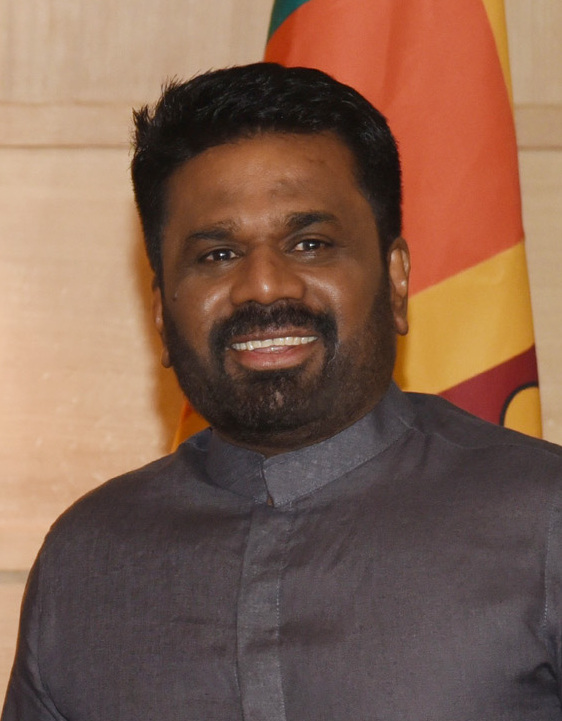

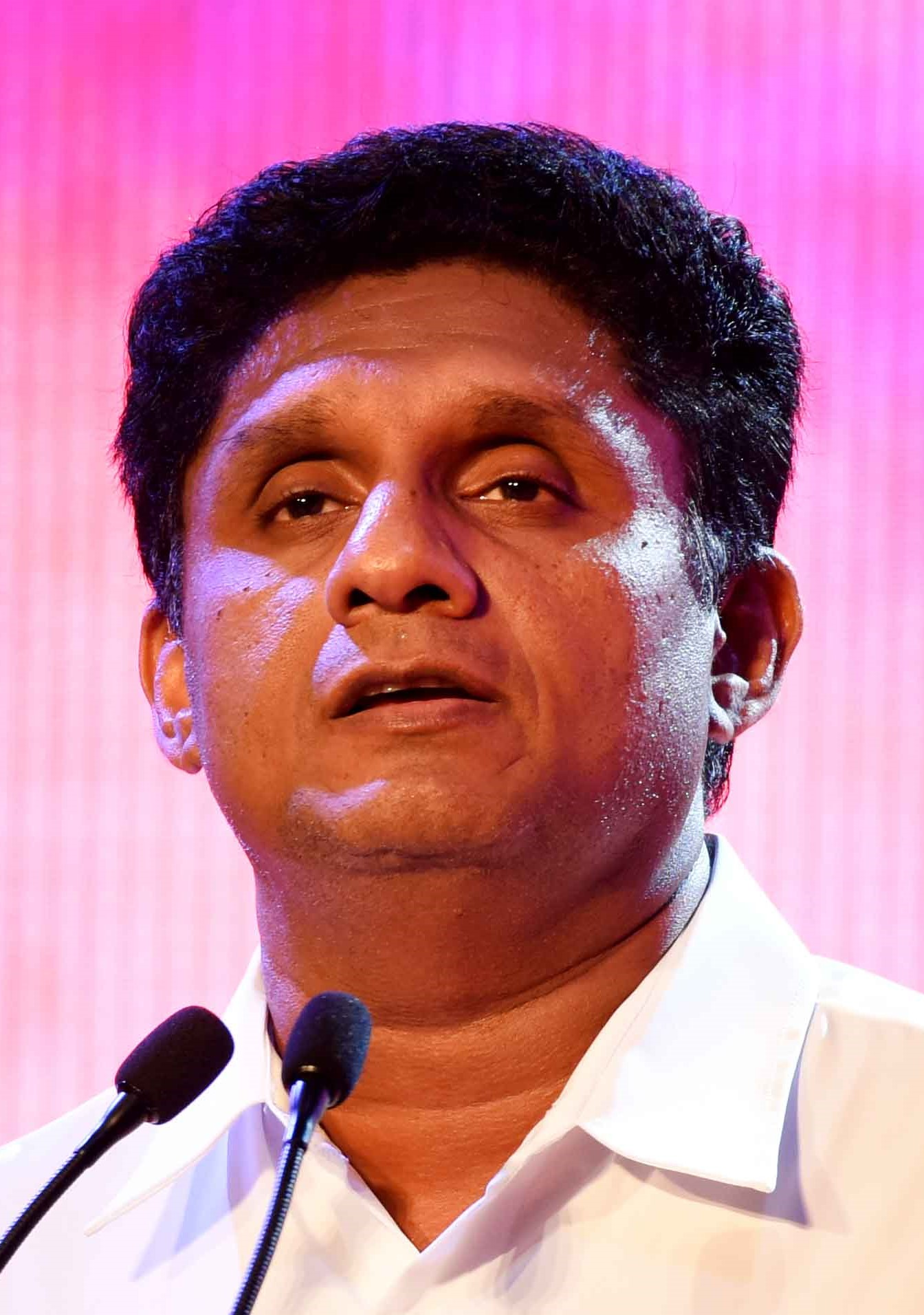

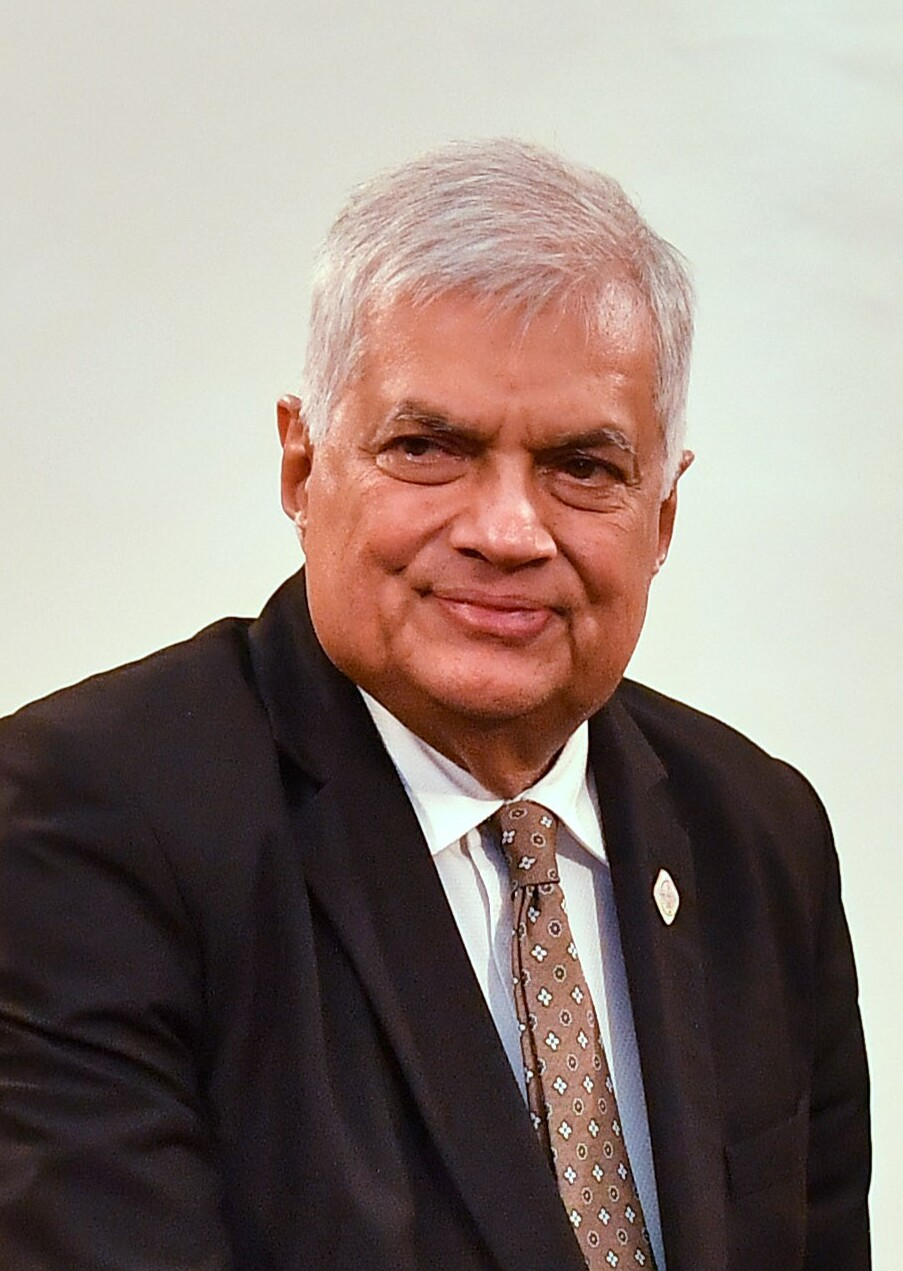
| Candidate | Anura Kumara Dissanayake | Sajith Premadasa | Ranil Wickremesinghe |
| Party | JVP | SJB | Independent |
| Alliance | NPP | SJB | UNP (Note: Member of the United National Party officially running as independent, endorsed by the UNP and SLPP breakaway faction) |
| Popular vote | 5,634,915 (Note: All-island votes received in the 1st round of counting without preferences.) | 4,363,035 | 2,299,767 |
| Percentage | 42.31% | 32.76% | 17.27% |
| Total votes (Note: All-island + preferential votes received in the 2nd round of counting.) | 5,740,179 (Note: Total votes: 5,634,915 + 105,264) | 4,530,902 (Note: Total votes: 4,363,035 + 167,035) | Eliminated |
| Total % | 55.89% (Note: Percentage of the total votes polled (all-island and preferential) by each of the two remaining candidates. All other candidates and their respective first-round vote totals have been eliminated.) | 44.11% | Eliminated |
President before election
Ranil Wickremesinghe
UNP
Elected President
Anura Kumara Dissanayake
NPP

Presidential elections were held in Sri Lanka on 21 September 2024. Incumbent president Ranil Wickremesinghe ran for re-election as an independent candidate, making him the first sitting president to run for re-election since Mahinda Rajapaksa in 2015. Other prominent candidates included Leader of the Opposition Sajith Premadasa, Anura Kumara Dissanayake of the NPP, and Namal Rajapaksa, son of former President Mahinda Rajapaksa.

The elections were a three-way contest between Wickremesinghe, Premadasa and Dissanayake. For the first time in a Sri Lankan presidential election, no candidate received a majority of the vote. Dissanayake was in first place with 42%, followed by Premadasa with 33%. Incumbent president Wickremesinghe finished third, receiving only 17% of the vote. As no candidate received a majority, second preference votes were counted. The following day, Dissanayake was declared the winner with 56% of the vote after second preferences had been taken into account. He was inaugurated on 23 September.

The elections signified a major political realignment in Sri Lanka. Dissanayake's victory was the first time a third-party candidate was elected president. This was also the first election where neither of the top two candidates were endorsed by the United National Party or the Sri Lanka Freedom Party.

== Background ==
The last direct presidential elections held in Sri Lanka were in 2019, where SLPP candidate Gotabaya Rajapaksa won the election in a landslide victory, defeating his main opponent Sajith Premadasa.

Rajapaksa resigned on 14 July 2022 during the 2022 Sri Lankan protests. This triggered an indirect presidential election via Parliament a week later, to elect a successor according to the Article 40 of the Constitution. Ranil Wickremesinghe, who had been appointed as Prime Minister by Rajapaksa just two months earlier, received the most votes and was sworn in as the 9th President of Sri Lanka on 21 July 2022.

Article 40 of the Constitution of Sri Lanka states that "Any person so succeeding to the office of President shall hold office only for the unexpired period of the term of office of the President vacating office. President Wickremesinghe's term expired on 17 November 2024.

Discussion surrounding the 2024 election had been a major topic since the beginning of the year. The Election Commission stated that the election had to be held between 17 September and 16 October, as required by the Constitution. On 26 July, the Election Commission issued a Gazette notification declaring that the election would be held on 21 September 2024, with nominations for candidates to be submitted by 15 August. The commission chose to hold the election on a Saturday, stating that this would help ensure a high voter turnout. On the same day, Ranil Wickremesinghe announced his candidacy for a second term as president, running as an independent candidate.

Approximately 17 million people were eligible to vote in this election.

== Electoral system ==
=== Type of electoral system ===
The President of Sri Lanka is elected through a system of limited ranked voting. Voters can express up to three ranked preferences for the presidency. If no candidate receives more than 50% of all valid votes in the first count, all candidates except the two who received the highest number of votes are eliminated. The second and third preference votes of the eliminated candidates are then redistributed to the remaining two candidates until one of them secures an outright majority.

In practice, this system had seen no use. Every presidential election since the first in 1982 had resulted in a candidate from one of the major parties or alliances winning an outright majority in the first count. Consequently, most voters choose to mark only one candidate on their ballots, and many are either unaware that they can rank multiple candidates or choose not to exercise that prerogative.

=== Voting procedure ===
The Election Commission outlined the voting procedure on 30 August 2024, detailing the ranked voting system due to the multiple candidates contesting the presidential election, ensuring voters were informed on how to cast and submit their ballots. Voting began at 13,134 polling stations nationwide at 7:00 AM SLST on 21 September and closed at 4:00 PM SLST.

=== Postal voting ===
The Election Commission announced the dates and locations for postal voting in a media release on 29 August 2024. This facility is available only to pre-approved officials engaged in election duties. Postal voting was conducted on 4, 5, 6, 11, and 12 September, strictly according to the provided schedule.

=== Ballot boxes and security systems ===
Due to the larger size of the ballot papers, the Election Commission has opted to use cardboard ballot boxes instead of traditional wooden ones. These boxes will be available in three sizes. A combination of wooden and cardboard ballot boxes was used in the 2019 Sri Lankan presidential election and the 2020 Sri Lankan parliamentary election.

To further ensure security, the government imposed a liquor ban on the weekend of 21 to 22 September and deployed more than 63,000 police officers to secure polling stations and counting centres. It also banned the holding of victory rallies or celebrations until a week after the results were announced. A nighttime curfew was also declared after the end of voting, which was lifted at noon on 22 September.

== Recent Sri Lankan election results ==
=== Prior election results ===
Election results
| Dates of elections | Sri Lanka Podujana Peramuna (SLPFA) | | Samagi Jana Balawegaya | | National People's Power | | Tamil National Alliance | | United National Party | | Others | |
| Dates of elections | Votes | % | Votes | % | Votes | % | Votes | % | Votes | % | Votes | % |
|---|---|---|---|---|---|---|---|---|---|---|---|---|
| 2019 presidential election | 6,924,255 | 52.25% | － | － | 418,553 | 3.16% | － | － | 5,564,239 | 41.99% (Note: New Democratic Front candidate led by the United National Party) | 345,452 | 2.35% |
| 2020 parliamentary election | 6,853,690 | 59.09% | 2,771,980 | 23.90% | 445,958 | 3.84% | 327,168 | 2.82% | 249,435 | 2.15% | 950,698 | 8.20% |

=== Maps ===
Election results map
| 2019 presidential election | 2020 parliamentary election |
|---|---|
Elected members of each electoral district or municipality, gaining the highest number of votes ■ SLPFA ■ SJB ■ TNA ■ SLFP ■ EPDP ■ Other parties

== Candidates ==
By the end of candidate registration on 15 August, the Election Commission had accepted a total of 39 applications for the presidential election, the highest number ever recorded for a presidential election in Sri Lanka. One candidate, Mohamed Illiyas, died of a heart attack prior to the election. His name on the ballot was not replaced. Despite the record number of candidates, none were female.

=== Major candidates ===
| Candidate | Political office and constituency | Symbol | Endorsements | Notes | Ref. |
|---|---|---|---|---|---|
| Ranil Wickremesinghe (75); Independent | President of Sri Lanka (2022–2024); Leader of the United National Party (since 1994); Former Prime Minister of Sri Lanka (1993–1994, 2001–2004, 2015–2018, 2018–2019, 2022) | Gas Cylinder | United National Party; Breakaway members of the Sri Lanka Podujana Peramuna; Ceylon Workers' Congress; De facto Central Committee of the Sri Lanka Freedom Party; Eelam People's Democratic Party; Mahajana Eksath Peramuna; New Lanka Freedom Party; Tamil Makkal Viduthalai Pulikal | Declared 26 July 2024; Relative of former President J. R. Jayewardene; Previously ran in 1999 and 2005.; Election manifesto launched on 29 August 2024 | |
| Sajith Premadasa (57); Samagi Jana Balawegaya | Leader of the Opposition (since 2019); Leader of the Samagi Jana Balawegaya (since 2020); Colombo | Telephone | Samagi Jana Balawegaya; All Ceylon Makkal Congress; Freedom People's Congress; Humane People's Alliance; Ilankai Tamil Arasu Kachchi; Sri Lanka Freedom Party (Dayasiri faction); Sri Lanka Muslim Congress; Tamil Progressive Alliance; United People's Freedom Alliance; United Republican Front; Up-Country People's Front | Declared 16 May 2023; Son of former president Ranasinghe Premadasa; Previously ran in 2019.; Election manifesto launched on 29 August 2024 | |
| Anura Kumara Dissanayake (55); National People's Power | Former Minister and Chief Opposition Whip (2015–2018); Leader of the National People's Power (since 2015); Leader of the Janatha Vimukthi Peramuna (since 2014); Colombo | Compass | National People's Power; Janatha Vimukthi Peramuna | Declared 29 August 2023; Previously ran in 2019.; Election manifesto launched on 26 August 2024 | |

=== Minor candidates ===
| Candidate | Political office and constituency | Symbol | Endorsements | Notes | Ref. |
|---|---|---|---|---|---|
| Namal Rajapaksa (38); Sri Lanka Podujana Peramuna | Former Minister of Youth and Sports (2020–2022); Hambantota | Flower bud (Pohottuwa) | Sri Lanka Podujana Peramuna | Declared on 7 August 2024; Son of former president Mahinda Rajapaksa; Nephew of former president Gotabaya Rajapaksa; Election manifesto launched on 2 September 2024 | |

=== Other candidates ===
In addition to the four candidates mentioned above, 35 other candidates ran in the election.

| Candidate | Party | Symbol | Notes |
|---|---|---|---|
| Siripala Amarasinghe | Independent | Tyre | Former JVP/UPFA MP for Gampaha. Presidential candidate in 2019. |
| P. Ariyanethiran | Independent | Conch shell | Former ITAK/TNA MP for Batticaloa. Endorsed by the EPRLF, PLOTE, TELO, Tamil National Party and TMK. |
| D. M. Bandaranaike | Independent | Table fan | |
| P. W. S. K. Bandaranayake | National Development Front | Coconut | Academic at the University of Peradeniya. |
| Nuwan Bopage | Socialist People's Forum | Umbrella | Aragalaya activist. Endorsed by the FSP and New Democratic Marxist–Leninist Party. |
| Akmeemana Dayarathana Thero | Independent | Blackboard | Former JHU/UPFA MP for Colombo. |
| Mahinda Dewage | Socialist Party of Sri Lanka | Balloon | |
| Sarath Fonseka | Independent | Lantern | 5th Chief of the Defence Staff. 18th Commander of the Sri Lanka Army. Former Minister. SJB MP from Gampaha. Presidential candidate in 2010. |
| Oshala Herath | New Independent Front | Till | Leader of New Independent Front. Former UNP candidate in Colombo. |
| Mohamed Illiyas | Independent | Syringe | Former SLMC MP for Jaffna. Presidential candidate in 2010 (endorsed Sarath Fonseka), 2015 and 2019. Died on 22 August 2024. |
| Abubakar Mohamed Infaz | Democratic Unity Alliance | Two leaves | |
| Sidney Jayarathna | Independent | Jackfruit | Former UNP/UNFGG MP for Polonnaruwa. |
| Siritunga Jayasuriya | United Socialist Party | Tri-shaw | Presidential candidate in 2005, 2010, 2015 and 2019. |
| Dilith Jayaweera | Communist Party of Sri Lanka | Star | Leader of Mawbima Janatha Pakshaya. Endorsed by the Sarvajana Balaya. Election manifesto launched on 31 August 2024. |
| Sarath Keerthirathne | Independent | Football | Former Deputy Minister. Former SLFP/PA MP for Gampaha. Presidential candidate in 2019. |
| K. R. Kishan | Arunalu People's Front | Water tap | |
| Ananda Kularatne | Independent | Medal | Former Cabinet Minister. Former UNP/UNF MP for Hambantota. |
| A. S. P. Liyanage | Sri Lanka Labour Party | Kangaroo | Presidential candidate in 2010, 2015 and 2019. |
| Sarath Manamendra | New Sinhala Heritage | Bow and arrow | Presidential candidate in 2010, 2015 (endorsed Mahinda Rajapaksa) and 2019. |
| Victor Anthony Perera | Independent | Motorbike | Former SLFP/UPFA MP for Puttalam. |
| K. K. Piyadasa | Independent | Calculator | Former UNP/UNFGG MP for Nuwara Eliya. |
| Anuruddha Polgampola | Independent | Horseshoe | Former JVP/UPFA MP for Kegalle. Presidential candidate in 2015 and 2019. |
| M. M. Premasiri | Independent | Pair of spectacles | Former JVP/UPFA MP for Matara. |
| Namal Rajapakshe | Samabima Party | Envelope | Presidential candidate in 2015 and 2019. Not to be confused with SLPP candidate Namal Rajapaksa, not related to the Rajapaksa family. |
| Wijeyadasa Rajapakshe | National Democratic Front | Car | Former Cabinet Minister. SLFP MP for Colombo. Endorsed by a faction of the SLFP. |
| Roshan Ranasinghe | Independent | Cricket bat | Former Cabinet Minister. SLPP/SLPFA MP for Polonnaruwa. |
| Janaka Ratnayake | United Lanka People's Party | Cup | Former chairman of the PUCSL. |
| Battaramulle Seelarathana Thero | People's Welfare Front | Tractor | Presidential candidate in 2010, 2015 and 2019. |
| Lalith de Silva | United National Freedom Front | Comb of plantains | |
| Suranjeewa Anoj de Silva | Democratic United National Front | Eagle | |
| M. Thilakarajah | Independent | Bird feather | Former NUW/UNFGG MP for Nuwara Eliya. |
| Keerthi Wickremeratne | Our People's Power Party | Flag | Endorsed by the Lanka Sama Samaja Party. Election manifesto launched on 27 August 2024. |
| Priyantha Wickremesinghe | Nava Sama Samaja Party | Table | |
| Pani Wijesiriwardena | Socialist Equality Party | Pair of scissors | Presidential candidate in 2015 and 2019. |
| Ajantha de Zoyza | Ruhunu People's Party | Pineapple | Former SLFP/PA National List MP. Presidential candidate in 2019 (endorsed Sajith Premadasa). |

One of the main reasons for the proliferation of candidates is the low election deposit required to contest – Rs. 50,000 (US$170) for party candidates and Rs. 75,000 (US$250) for independent candidates. These amounts that have remained unchanged since the introduction of presidential elections in 1982.

Many of the minor candidates are accused of being proxy or dummy candidates put forward by the main contenders to maximise the benefits of candidacy, such as having two agents at every polling station, assigning counting agents, receiving free slots on state television, and gaining general media coverage.

=== Withdrawn candidates ===
The following candidates initially declared their intentions to contest the election but later withdrew from the campaign.

Sri Lanka Podujana Peramuna

- Gotabaya Rajapaksa, 8th President of Sri Lanka (2019–2022)
- Basil Rajapaksa, former Minister of Finance (2021–2022), former Member of Parliament (2007–2010, 2010–2015, 2021–2022) (Note: Not eligible to contest due to holding dual citizenship)
- Dhammika Perera, businessman, former Minister of Investment Promotion (2022), Member of Parliament (2022–2024)

Sri Lanka Freedom Party

- Maithripala Sirisena, 7th President of Sri Lanka (2015–2019), Member of Parliament (1989–2015, 2020–2024)

=== Rejected candidates ===
The following candidate placed his deposit before the nomination date but failed to appear and submit his nomination papers.

- Sarath Kumara Gunaratna, former Deputy Minister, former SLFP/UPFA Member of Parliament (2006–2015)

== Campaign ==
=== Platforms ===
Ranil Wickremesinghe highlighted his administration's success in resolving shortages of basic goods. Anura Kumara Dissanayake campaigned on a platform promoting economic freedoms and welfare protections for the working class. Sajith Premadasa vowed to mitigate the impact of the International Monetary Fund's restructuring programme on the poor and promised devolved political powers to the Tamil minority. Namal Rajapaksa pledged to reduce tax burdens, attributing the recent economic and political crises to the COVID-19 pandemic.

=== Abolition of executive presidency ===
During the election campaign, both Dissanayake and Premadasa promised that, if elected, they would abolish the executive presidential system and return the country to a parliamentary democracy. This familiar pre-election pledge had been declared by numerous candidates in the past, yet hopes have been met with doubt.

On 23 September 2024, National People's Power member Sunil Handunnetti informed the media that the abolition of the executive presidency remains a priority for the government led by newly elected President Anura Kumara Dissanayake.

=== Debates ===
The first presidential debate was scheduled for 7 September 2024, hosted by the March 12 Movement. Four candidates, Sajith Premadasa, Namal Rajapaksa, Dilith Jayaweera, and P. Ariyanethiran, confirmed their participation. The debate took place at the Bandaranaike Memorial International Conference Hall (BMICH) and was broadcast live on mainstream television and social media platforms. However, despite initial confirmations, only Dilith Jayaweera attended the debate.

=== Election monitors ===
Following an invitation from the Election Commission of Sri Lanka, the European External Action Service (EEAS) of the European Union (EU) will deploy an Election Observation Mission (EOM) to observe the Presidential Election scheduled for 21 September.

The Election Commission further announced that representatives from 12 countries have been invited to observe the upcoming election. Among those participating are South Asian countries such as India, Nepal, Bangladesh, Pakistan, and the Maldives, as well as a Commonwealth observer group (COG) and representatives from the Asian Election Observation Network.

=== Campaign finances ===
==== Expenditure cap and regulations ====
The Election Commission, through a Gazette notification (Gazette Extraordinary – No. 2397/66 on 16 August 2024), set an expenditure cap of Rs. 109 per voter for the 2024 presidential election. As a result, each candidate is now permitted to spend a maximum of Rs. 1.8 billion (Rs. 1,868,298,586). These regulations have been enforced under the Regulation of Election Expenditure Act, No. 3 of 2023, which was certified on 24 January 2023.

==== Candidate asset declarations ====
Under the Anti-Corruption Act, election candidates must submit a Declaration of Assets and Liabilities to the Commissioner of Elections with their nomination papers, covering assets and liabilities up to the date the election is announced.

After candidates in the Presidential Election submitted their declarations to the Elections Commission on 15 August 2024, the deadline for nomination papers, the commission to Investigate Allegations of Bribery or Corruption (CIABOC) obtained and published redacted versions on its official website.

| Candidate | Personal | | Party | | Total spent |
| Candidate | Money spent | Debt | Money spent | Debt | Total spent |
|---|---|---|---|---|---|
| Sajith Premadasa | LKR 936,258,524.60 | LKR 0 | LKR 194,087,715.04 | LKR 0 | LKR 1,130,346,239.64 |
| Ranil Wickremesinghe | LKR 990,327,687.16 | LKR 0 | No Data | No Data | LKR 990,327,687.16 |
| Namal Rajapaksa | LKR 406,566.00 | LKR 0 | LKR 388,939,085.00 | LKR 200,000,000.00 | LKR 589,345,651.00 |
| Anura Kumara Dissanayake | LKR 68,066.36 | LKR 0 | LKR 527,999,889.38 | LKR 0 | LKR 527,999,889.38 |
| Dilith Jayaweera | LKR 324,643,246.05 | LKR 0 | LKR 0 | LKR 0 | LKR 324,643,246.05 |
| Wijeyadasa Rajapakshe | LKR 60,445,320.00 | LKR 0 | LKR 0 | LKR 0 | LKR 60,445,320.00 |
| Sarath Fonseka | LKR 33,588,901.72 | LKR 0 | LKR 0 | LKR 0 | LKR 33,588,901.72 |
| Janaka Ratnayake | LKR 24,876,899.00 | LKR 0 | LKR 0 | LKR 0 | LKR 24,876,899.00 |
| Roshan Ranasinghe | LKR 78,600.00 | LKR 0 | LKR 2,722,000.00 | LKR 0 | LKR 2,800,600.00 |

== Opinion polls ==
=== Institute for Health Policy ===
The Institute for Health Policy (IHP) is an independent research institution.

The following nationwide presidential poll was conducted by the IHP. The poll ranked Sajith Premadasa, Anura Kumara Dissanayake, Ranil Wickremesinghe, and a generic SLPP candidate. All polls conducted before Namal Rajapaksa announced his candidacy on 7 August, including the IHP MRP Presidential Election Update June 2024 released on 1 August, did not account for his entry.

| Date | Polling firm | Dissanayake NPP | Premadasa SJB | Wickremesinghe Independent | Rajapaksa SLPP | Others | Lead | Margin of error | Sample size |
|---|---|---|---|---|---|---|---|---|---|
| 31 August–13 September 2024 | Institute for Health Policy | 48% | 25% | 20% | 5% | —N/a | 23 | ±3–6% | 20,714 |
| 1 August–2 September 2024 | Institute for Health Policy | 36% | 32% | 28% | 3% | —N/a | 4 | ±3–7% | 19,721 |
| 7 August 2024 | Rajapaksa declares his candidacy. | | | | | | | | |
| 26 July 2024 | Wickremesinghe declares his candidacy. | | | | | | | | |
| July 2024 | Institute for Health Policy | 37% | 36% | 23% | 4% | —N/a | 1 | ±1–3% | 19,015 |
| June 2024 | Institute for Health Policy | 30% | 43% | 20% | 7% | —N/a | 13 | ±1–11% | 18,213 |
| May 2024 | Institute for Health Policy | 39% | 38% | 15% | 7% | —N/a | 1 | ±1–4% | 17,751 |
| April 2024 | Institute for Health Policy | 39% | 39% | 13% | 9% | —N/a | Tie | ±1–4% | 17,134 |
| March 2024 | Institute for Health Policy | 44% | 41% | 8% | 7% | —N/a | 3 | ±1–4% | 16,661 |
| February 2024 | Institute for Health Policy | 53% | 34% | 6% | 7% | —N/a | 19 | ±1–4% | 16,234 |
| January 2024 | Institute for Health Policy | 50% | 36% | 7% | 7% | —N/a | 14 | ±1–4% | 15,590 |
| December 2023 | Institute for Health Policy | 50% | 33% | 9% | 8% | —N/a | 17 | ±1–4% | 14,941 |
| October 2023 | Institute for Health Policy | 51% | 30% | 13% | 6% | —N/a | 21 | ±1–4% | 13,935 |
| September 2023 | Institute for Health Policy | 46% | 29% | 17% | 8% | —N/a | 17 | ±1–3% | 13,431 |
| 29 August 2023 | Dissanayake declares his candidacy. | | | | | | | | |
| August 2023 | Institute for Health Policy | 38% | 35% | 18% | 9% | —N/a | 3 | ±1–3% | 12,848 |
| July 2023 | Institute for Health Policy | 39% | 33% | 19% | 9% | —N/a | 6 | ±1–3% | 12,269 |
| June 2023 | Institute for Health Policy | 40% | 35% | 15% | 9% | —N/a | 5 | ±1–3% | 11,926 |
| 16 May 2023 | Premadasa declares his candidacy. | | | | | | | | |
| May 2023 | Institute for Health Policy | 38% | 34% | 18% | 10% | —N/a | 4 | ±1–4% | 11,897 |
| April 2023 | Institute for Health Policy | 45% | 37% | 13% | 6% | —N/a | 8 | ±1–4% | 11,367 |
| March 2023 | Institute for Health Policy | 48% | 37% | 11% | 4% | —N/a | 11 | ±1–5% | 10,601 |

=== Numbers.lk ===
Numbers.lk is a platform that curates and presents statistics related to Sri Lanka.

| Date | Polling firm | Dissanayake NPP | Premadasa SJB | Wickremesinghe Independent | Rajapaksa SLPP | Others | Lead | Margin of error | Sample size |
|---|---|---|---|---|---|---|---|---|---|
| 9–16 September 2024 | numbers.lk | 40% | 29% | 25% | 3% | 3% | 11 | ±5% | 5,335 |
| 9–23 August 2024 | numbers.lk | 43% | 22% | 27% | 3% | 4% | 16 | ±3% | 3,900 |
| 4–18 April 2024 | numbers.lk | 46% | 22% | 18% | – | 14% | 24 | ±3.5% | 2,048 |

=== Favourability ratings ===
Note

- Negative scores, which denote a net favourability rating below zero, indicate that the individual or institution is considered unpopular. In contrast, positive scores, where the net favourability is above zero, suggest that the individual or institution is generally regarded as popular.

January 2024

In the Institute for Health Policy (IHP) Sri Lanka Opinion Tracker Survey (SLOTS) polling, all major party candidates continued to have negative favourability ratings. The net favourability rating of Anura Kumara Dissanayake increased by 12 points to −10, while the favourability ratings of Sajith Premadasa and incumbent President Ranil Wickremesinghe each decreased by 9 points, to −53 and −77, respectively.

March 2024

In IHP SLOTS polling, the net favourability rating of Sajith Premadasa increased by 30 points to −30 in March compared to the previous month, while the favourability ratings of Anura Kumara Dissanayake and President Ranil Wickremesinghe remained relatively unchanged at −24 (down 2 points) and −78 (up 1 point), respectively.

July 2024

In the IHP SLOTS polling conducted in July 2024, the net favourability rating of Anura Kumara Dissanayake rose by 29 points from June, reaching +3. President Ranil Wickremesinghe's favourability improved by 40 points to −24, surpassing that of Sajith Premadasa. Sajith Premadasa's favourability rating changed little, shifting from −42 in June to −44 in July.

August 2024

In the IHP SLOTS polling for August 2024, the net favourability rating of Sajith Premadasa improved to −32, a 10-point increase compared to July. Meanwhile, Anura Kumara Dissanayake and President Ranil Wickremesinghe saw their favourability ratings drop to −21 (a decrease of 16 points) and −33 (a decrease of 4 points), respectively. The favourability rating of Namal Rajapaksa, stood at −89.

== Results ==
| Candidate | Party | First preference | | Total votes | |
| Candidate | Party | Votes | % | Votes | % |
|---|---|---|---|---|---|
| Anura Kumara Dissanayake | National People's Power | 5,634,915 | 42.31 | 5,740,179 | 55.89 |
| Sajith Premadasa | Samagi Jana Balawegaya | 4,363,035 | 32.76 | 4,530,902 | 44.11 |
| Ranil Wickremesinghe | Independent | 2,299,767 | 17.27 | | |
| Namal Rajapaksa | Sri Lanka Podujana Peramuna | 342,781 | 2.57 | | |
| P. Ariyanethiran | Independent | 226,343 | 1.70 | | |
| Dilith Jayaweera | Communist Party of Sri Lanka | 122,396 | 0.92 | | |
| K. K. Piyadasa | Independent | 47,543 | 0.36 | | |
| D. M. Bandaranayake | Independent | 30,660 | 0.23 | | |
| Sarath Fonseka | Independent | 22,407 | 0.17 | | |
| Wijeyadasa Rajapakshe | National Democratic Front | 21,306 | 0.16 | | |
| Anuruddha Polgampola | Independent | 15,411 | 0.12 | | |
| Sarath Keerthirathne | Independent | 15,187 | 0.11 | | |
| K. R. Krishan | Arunalu People's Front | 13,595 | 0.10 | | |
| Suranjeewa Anoj de Silva | Democratic United National Front | 12,898 | 0.10 | | |
| Priyantha Wickremesinghe | Nava Sama Samaja Party | 12,760 | 0.10 | | |
| Namal Rajapaksha | Samabima Party | 12,700 | 0.10 | | |
| Akmeemana Dayarathana Thero | Independent | 11,536 | 0.09 | | |
| Nuwan Bopege | Socialist People's Forum | 11,191 | 0.08 | | |
| Ajantha de Zoyza | Ruhunu People's Party | 10,548 | 0.08 | | |
| Victor Anthony Perera | Independent | 10,374 | 0.08 | | |
| Siripala Amarasinghe | Independent | 9,035 | 0.07 | | |
| Siritunga Jayasuriya | United Socialist Party | 8,954 | 0.07 | | |
| Battaramulle Seelarathana Thero | People's Welfare Front | 6,839 | 0.05 | | |
| Abubakar Mohamed Infaz | Democratic Unity Alliance | 6,531 | 0.05 | | |
| Pemasiri Manage | Independent | 5,822 | 0.04 | | |
| Mahinda Dewage | Socialist Party of Sri Lanka | 5,338 | 0.04 | | |
| Keerthi Wickremeratne | Our People's Power Party | 4,676 | 0.04 | | |
| Pani Wijesiriwardena | Socialist Equality Party | 4,410 | 0.03 | | |
| Oshala Herath | New Independent Front | 4,253 | 0.03 | | |
| Roshan Ranasinghe | Independent | 4,205 | 0.03 | | |
| P. W. S. K. Bandaranayake | National Development Front | 4,070 | 0.03 | | |
| Ananda Kularatne | Independent | 4,013 | 0.03 | | |
| Lalith de Silva | United National Freedom Front | 3,004 | 0.02 | | |
| Sidney Jayarathna | Independent | 2,799 | 0.02 | | |
| Janaka Ratnayake | United Lanka People's Party | 2,405 | 0.02 | | |
| M. Thilakarajah | Independent | 2,138 | 0.02 | | |
| Sarath Manamendra | New Sinhala Heritage | 1,911 | 0.01 | | |
| A. S. P. Liyanage | Sri Lanka Labour Party | 1,860 | 0.01 | | |
| Total | | 13,319,616 | 100.00 | 10,271,081 | 100.00 |
| Valid votes | | 13,319,616 | 97.80 | 10,271,081 | 75.41 |
| Invalid/blank votes | | 300,300 | 2.20 | 3,348,835 | 24.59 |
| Total votes | | 13,619,916 | 100.00 | 13,619,916 | 100.00 |
| Registered voters/turnout | | 17,140,354 | 79.46 | 17,140,354 | 79.46 |
Source: Election Commission of Sri Lanka

=== By district ===
==== First round ====
Districts won by Dissanayake
Districts won by Premadasa

Summary of the 2024 Sri Lankan presidential election by electoral district
| Electoral District | Province | Dissanayake | | Premadasa | | Wickremesinghe | | Others | | Total Valid | Rejected Votes | Total Polled | Registered Electors | Turnout |
| Electoral District | Province | Votes | % | Votes | % | Votes | % | Votes | % | Total Valid | Rejected Votes | Total Polled | Registered Electors | Turnout |
|---|---|---|---|---|---|---|---|---|---|---|---|---|---|---|
| Ampara | Eastern | 108,971 | 25.74% | 200,384 | 47.33% | 86,589 | 20.45% | 27,453 | 4.22% | 423,397 | 6,563 | 429,960 | 555,432 | 77.41% |
| Anuradhapura | North Central | 285,944 | 47.37% | 202,289 | 33.51% | 82,152 | 13.61% | 33,301 | 3.17% | 603,686 | 9,782 | 613,468 | 741,862 | 82.69% |
| Badulla | Uva | 197,283 | 34.68% | 219,674 | 38.61% | 115,138 | 20.34% | 36,829 | 3.13% | 568,924 | 15,519 | 584,443 | 705,772 | 82.81% |
| Batticaloa | Eastern | 38,832 | 12.19% | 139,110 | 43.66% | 91,132 | 28.60% | 49,574 | 12.63% | 318,648 | 8,876 | 327,524 | 449,686 | 72.83% |
| Colombo | Western | 629,963 | 47.21% | 342,108 | 25.64% | 281,436 | 21.09% | 80,883 | 4.31% | 1,334,390 | 31,796 | 1,366,186 | 1,765,351 | 77.39% |
| Galle | Southern | 366,721 | 51.45% | 189,555 | 26.59% | 107,336 | 15.06% | 49,208 | 6.90% | 712,820 | 12,541 | 725,361 | 903,163 | 80.31% |
| Gampaha | Western | 809,410 | 55.50% | 349,550 | 23.97% | 216,028 | 14.81% | 83,401 | 4.05% | 1,458,389 | 29,381 | 1,487,770 | 1,881,129 | 79.09% |
| Hambantota | Southern | 221,913 | 51.96% | 131,503 | 30.79% | 33,217 | 7.78% | 40,429 | 9.47% | 427,062 | 6,443 | 433,505 | 520,940 | 83.22% |
| Jaffna | Northern | 27,086 | 7.29% | 121,177 | 32.60% | 84,558 | 22.75% | 138,867 | 37.36% | 371,688 | 25,353 | 397,041 | 593,187 | 66.93% |
| Kalutara | Western | 387,764 | 47.43% | 236,307 | 28.91% | 143,285 | 17.53% | 50,162 | 4.10% | 817,518 | 16,243 | 833,761 | 1,024,244 | 81.40% |
| Kandy | Central | 394,534 | 42.26% | 323,998 | 34.71% | 162,707 | 17.43% | 52,277 | 3.13% | 933,516 | 24,153 | 957,669 | 1,191,399 | 80.38% |
| Kegalle | Sabaragamuwa | 247,179 | 43.39% | 185,930 | 32.64% | 106,510 | 18.70% | 30,060 | 2.94% | 569,679 | 11,878 | 581,557 | 709,622 | 81.95% |
| Kurunegala | North Western | 544,763 | 48.20% | 368,290 | 32.58% | 146,520 | 12.96% | 70,720 | 4.17% | 1,130,293 | 19,337 | 1,149,630 | 1,417,226 | 81.12% |
| Matale | Central | 140,544 | 41.37% | 121,803 | 35.85% | 53,829 | 15.84% | 23,558 | 3.96% | 339,734 | 7,921 | 347,655 | 429,991 | 80.85% |
| Matara | Southern | 287,662 | 52.46% | 147,462 | 26.89% | 79,249 | 14.45% | 33,956 | 4.12% | 548,329 | 9,687 | 558,016 | 686,175 | 81.32% |
| Monaragala | Uva | 140,269 | 41.86% | 134,238 | 40.06% | 35,728 | 10.66% | 24,847 | 4.60% | 335,082 | 6,671 | 341,753 | 399,166 | 85.62% |
| Nuwara Eliya | Central | 105,057 | 22.17% | 201,814 | 42.58% | 138,619 | 29.25% | 28,445 | 2.72% | 473,935 | 14,643 | 488,578 | 605,292 | 80.72% |
| Polonnaruwa | North Central | 130,880 | 46.12% | 100,730 | 35.49% | 36,908 | 13.00% | 15,283 | 5.39% | 283,801 | 4,962 | 288,763 | 351,302 | 82.19% |
| Puttalam | North Western | 207,134 | 44.06% | 173,382 | 36.88% | 60,719 | 12.92% | 28,860 | 3.55% | 470,095 | 8,279 | 478,374 | 663,673 | 72.08% |
| Ratnapura | Sabaragamuwa | 291,708 | 39.32% | 257,721 | 34.74% | 145,038 | 19.55% | 47,433 | 3.88% | 741,900 | 15,070 | 756,970 | 923,736 | 81.95% |
| Trincomalee | Eastern | 49,886 | 20.83% | 120,588 | 50.36% | 40,496 | 16.91% | 28,491 | 11.90% | 239,461 | 5,821 | 245,282 | 315,925 | 77.64% |
| Vanni | Northern | 21,412 | 9.86% | 95,422 | 43.92% | 52,573 | 24.20% | 47,862 | 22.02% | 217,269 | 9,381 | 226,650 | 306,081 | 74.05% |
| Total | | 5,634,915 | 42.31% | 4,363,035 | 32.76% | 2,299,767 | 17.27% | 1,021,899 | 7.66% | 13,319,616 | 300,300 | 13,619,916 | 17,140,354 | 79.46% |

== Aftermath ==
While counting was still underway, foreign minister Ali Sabry congratulated Dissanayake, citing his strong showing in the results. The test match between Sri Lanka and New Zealand featured a rest day due to the election. It was the first time in sixteen years since a test match had a rest day.

SJB MP Harsha de Silva congratulated Dissanayake. The Tamil National Alliance, which had endorsed Premadasa, congratulated Dissanayake for his "impressive win" without relying on "racial or religious chauvinism". Ranil Wickremesinghe also congratulated Dissanayake.

The International Monetary Fund congratulated Dissanayake and said it was ready to discuss the future of the economic recovery plan.

Dissanayake attributed his victory to the "collective effort" of voters. He was sworn in as president on 23 September. Parliament was dissolved by Dissanayake the next day, and early parliamentary elections were called on 14 November.

=== International reactions ===
- Australia: High Commissioner Paul Stephens congratulated Dissanayake and said he looked forward to strengthening the relationship between the two countries.
- Canada: The High Commission of Canada in Sri Lanka released a statement congratulating Dissanayake.
- Cuba: First Secretary Miguel Díaz-Canel congratulated Dissanayake and ratified the will to strengthen ties between Cuba and Sri Lanka.
- France: President Emmanuel Macron congratulated Dissanayake.
- India: Prime Minister Narendra Modi congratulated Dissanayake, expressing his desire to work with the President-elect to strengthen their cooperation.
- Japan: Ambassador Mizukoshi Hideaki released a statement congratulating Dissanayake, noting a "significant moment in Sri Lanka's journey as the country continues to recover from its economic challenges."
- Maldives: President Mohamed Muizzu released a post congratulating Dissanayake, saying he hoped to "strengthen the historic friendship between the Maldives and Sri Lanka."
- New Zealand: Minister of Foreign Affairs Winston Peters congratulated Dissanayake and praised the safe, fair, and free election conducted.
- Pakistan: Prime Minister Shehbaz Sharif congratulated Dissanayake, wishing him success.
- Saudi Arabia: Custodian of the Two Holy Mosques King Salman wished Dissanayake success and the people of Sri Lanka further progress and prosperity.
- United Arab Emirates: President Mohamed bin Zayed Al Nahyan wished Dissanayake success and said he looked forward to strengthen their countries' relations.
- United States: President Joe Biden congratulated Dissanayake and also noted that Sri Lankans voted in a "fair, free, and peaceful" election.
- United Kingdom: High Commissioner Andrew Patrick and Minister of State for Indo-Pacific Catherine West both released statements congratulating Dissanayake and looking forward to working with him.
- United Nations: Resident Coordinator in Sri Lanka Marc-André Franche congratulated Dissanayake and said he looked forward to work towards a more peaceful and inclusive society.

== See also ==
- 2024 Sri Lankan parliamentary election
