= Results of the 2001 Sri Lankan general election by electoral district =

Results of the 2001 Sri Lankan general election by electoral district.

== Number of votes ==
| Electoral District | Province | UNF | PA | JVP | TNA | SLMC | EPDP | SU | NLF | Ind | DPLF | USP | NDP | DLF | Others | Valid Votes | Rejected Votes | Total Polled | Registered Electors | Turnout % |
|---|---|---|---|---|---|---|---|---|---|---|---|---|---|---|---|---|---|---|---|---|
| Ampara | NE | 58,468 | 65,246 | 9,502 | 48,789 | 75,257 | 5,901 | 229 | 1,165 | 15,196 | | | | | 462 | 280,215 | 17,225 | 297,440 | 360,497 | 82.51% |
| Anuradhapura | NC | 165,055 | 149,393 | 40,005 | | | | 625 | 3,279 | 279 | | | | | 708 | 359,344 | 19,796 | 379,140 | 489,746 | 77.42% |
| Badulla | UV | 201,173 | 138,443 | 26,820 | | | | 1,044 | | 5,578 | | | 352 | | 427 | 373,837 | 26,626 | 400,463 | 491,288 | 81.51% |
| Batticaloa | NE | 22,638 | 25,705 | 119 | 86,284 | 26,725 | 4,153 | 103 | 619 | 6,842 | 5,601 | | | | 319 | 179,108 | 13,275 | 192,383 | 282,079 | 68.20% |
| Colombo | WE | 546,417 | 353,401 | 117,404 | 12,696 | | 647 | 16,970 | 3,457 | 300 | | 1,503 | | 3,322 | 2,364 | 1,058,481 | 40,901 | 1,099,382 | 1,440,682 | 76.31% |
| Galle | SO | 238,989 | 232,931 | 61,806 | | | | 2,328 | 2,448 | 1,010 | | 728 | | 465 | 1,209 | 541,914 | 24,561 | 566,475 | 698,566 | 81.09% |
| Gampaha | WE | 437,289 | 428,780 | 113,990 | | | | 8,105 | 3,488 | 967 | | 736 | | | 1,875 | 995,230 | 38,172 | 1,033,402 | 1,285,993 | 80.36% |
| Hambantota | SO | 112,520 | 105,175 | 59,693 | | | | 679 | 2,101 | 289 | | | | | 705 | 281,162 | 13,378 | 294,540 | 369,073 | 79.81% |
| Jaffna | NE | 16,245 | | 242 | 102,324 | 3,364 | 57,208 | 213 | 407 | 2,677 | 1,454 | 410 | | 2,054 | | 186,598 | 10,681 | 197,279 | 633,457 | 31.14% |
| Kalutara | WE | 254,339 | 226,468 | 60,451 | | | | 5,103 | 2,369 | 593 | | 2,162 | | | 2,134 | 553,619 | 32,617 | 586,236 | 717,764 | 81.68% |
| Kandy | CE | 314,297 | 233,637 | 37,146 | | | | 4,040 | 3,905 | 529 | | | | | 2,022 | 595,576 | 42,103 | 637,679 | 838,687 | 76.03% |
| Kegalle | SA | 208,104 | 170,901 | 36,711 | | | | 2,046 | 2,514 | 342 | | | | | 1,022 | 421,640 | 22,669 | 444,309 | 554,697 | 80.10% |
| Kurunegala | NW | 382,768 | 332,775 | 63,652 | | | | 2,842 | 3,194 | 641 | | | | | 1,856 | 787,728 | 38,401 | 826,129 | 1,045,652 | 79.01% |
| Matale | CE | 109,991 | 88,999 | 16,063 | | | | | 1,824 | 223 | | | | | 990 | 218,090 | 15,449 | 233,539 | 299,606 | 77.95% |
| Matara | SO | 171,661 | 171,141 | 54,476 | | | | 1,854 | 2,780 | 545 | | 856 | | | 654 | 403,967 | 20,820 | 424,787 | 534,694 | 79.44% |
| Monaragala | UV | 80,549 | 81,805 | 21,987 | | | | 359 | 1,745 | 424 | | | | | 464 | 187,333 | 15,638 | 202,971 | 247,280 | 82.08% |
| Nuwara Eliya | CE | 215,157 | 77,733 | 11,080 | | | | 642 | 1,687 | 376 | | 1,262 | 6,600 | 373 | 189 | 315,099 | 28,373 | 343,472 | 417,163 | 82.34% |
| Polonnaruwa | NC | 86,786 | 73,679 | 18,956 | | | | 199 | 1,517 | 169 | | | | | 191 | 181,497 | 11,854 | 193,351 | 240,444 | 80.41% |
| Puttalam | NW | 146,873 | 120,981 | 18,095 | | | | 1,545 | 1,870 | 157 | | | | | 688 | 290,209 | 14,638 | 304,847 | 426,193 | 71.53% |
| Ratnapura | SA | 227,202 | 212,794 | 40,377 | | | | 1,448 | 4,589 | 765 | | 1,556 | | | 847 | 489,578 | 30,483 | 520,061 | 623,506 | 83.41% |
| Trincomalee | NE | 62,930 | 32,997 | 6,095 | 56,121 | | 1,470 | 202 | 619 | 138 | | | | | 566 | 161,138 | 8,429 | 169,567 | 212,280 | 79.88% |
| Vanni | NE | 26,575 | 7,831 | 683 | 41,950 | | 3,404 | 89 | 324 | 3,712 | 9,614 | 242 | | | 82 | 94,506 | 7,855 | 102,361 | 218,861 | 46.77% |
| Total | | 4,086,026 | 3,330,815 | 815,353 | 348,164 | 105,346 | 72,783 | 50,665 | 45,901 | 41,752 | 16,669 | 9,455 | 6,952 | 6,214 | 19,774 | 8,955,869 | 493,944 | 9,449,813 | 12,428,208 | 76.04% |

== Percentage of votes ==
| Electoral District | Province | UNF | PA | JVP | TNA | SLMC | EPDP | SU | NLF | Ind | DPLF | USP | NDP | DLF | Others | Total |
|---|---|---|---|---|---|---|---|---|---|---|---|---|---|---|---|---|
| Ampara | NE | 20.87% | 23.28% | 3.39% | 17.41% | 26.86% | 2.11% | 0.08% | 0.42% | 5.42% | | | | | 0.16% | 100.00% |
| Anuradhapura | NC | 45.93% | 41.57% | 11.13% | | | 0.00% | 0.17% | 0.91% | 0.08% | | | | | 0.20% | 100.00% |
| Badulla | UV | 53.81% | 37.03% | 7.17% | | | 0.00% | 0.28% | | 1.49% | | | 0.09% | | 0.11% | 100.00% |
| Batticaloa | NE | 12.64% | 14.35% | 0.07% | 48.17% | 14.92% | 2.32% | 0.06% | 0.35% | 3.82% | 3.13% | | | | 0.18% | 100.00% |
| Colombo | WE | 51.62% | 33.39% | 11.09% | 1.20% | | 0.06% | 1.60% | 0.33% | 0.03% | | 0.14% | | 0.31% | 0.22% | 100.00% |
| Galle | SO | 44.10% | 42.98% | 11.41% | | | 0.00% | 0.43% | 0.45% | 0.19% | | 0.13% | | 0.09% | 0.22% | 100.00% |
| Gampaha | WE | 43.94% | 43.08% | 11.45% | | | 0.00% | 0.81% | 0.35% | 0.10% | | 0.07% | | | 0.19% | 100.00% |
| Hambantota | SO | 40.02% | 37.41% | 21.23% | | | 0.00% | 0.24% | 0.75% | 0.10% | | | | | 0.25% | 100.00% |
| Jaffna | NE | 8.71% | | 0.13% | 54.84% | 1.80% | 30.66% | 0.11% | 0.22% | 1.43% | 0.78% | 0.22% | | 1.10% | 0.00% | 100.00% |
| Kalutara | WE | 45.94% | 40.91% | 10.92% | | | 0.00% | 0.92% | 0.43% | 0.11% | | 0.39% | | | 0.39% | 100.00% |
| Kandy | CE | 52.77% | 39.23% | 6.24% | | | 0.00% | 0.68% | 0.66% | 0.09% | | | | | 0.34% | 100.00% |
| Kegalle | SA | 49.36% | 40.53% | 8.71% | | | 0.00% | 0.49% | 0.60% | 0.08% | | | | | 0.24% | 100.00% |
| Kurunegala | NW | 48.59% | 42.24% | 8.08% | | | 0.00% | 0.36% | 0.41% | 0.08% | | | | | 0.24% | 100.00% |
| Matale | CE | 50.43% | 40.81% | 7.37% | | | 0.00% | | 0.84% | 0.10% | | | | | 0.45% | 100.00% |
| Matara | SO | 42.49% | 42.37% | 13.49% | | | 0.00% | 0.46% | 0.69% | 0.13% | | 0.21% | | | 0.16% | 100.00% |
| Monaragala | UV | 43.00% | 43.67% | 11.74% | | | 0.00% | 0.19% | 0.93% | 0.23% | | | | | 0.25% | 100.00% |
| Nuwara Eliya | CE | 68.28% | 24.67% | 3.52% | | | 0.00% | 0.20% | 0.54% | 0.12% | | 0.40% | 2.09% | 0.12% | 0.06% | 100.00% |
| Polonnaruwa | NC | 47.82% | 40.60% | 10.44% | | | 0.00% | 0.11% | 0.84% | 0.09% | | | | | 0.11% | 100.00% |
| Puttalam | NW | 50.61% | 41.69% | 6.24% | | | 0.00% | 0.53% | 0.64% | 0.05% | | | | | 0.24% | 100.00% |
| Ratnapura | SA | 46.41% | 43.46% | 8.25% | | | 0.00% | 0.30% | 0.94% | 0.16% | | 0.32% | | | 0.17% | 100.00% |
| Trincomalee | NE | 39.05% | 20.48% | 3.78% | 34.83% | | 0.91% | 0.13% | 0.38% | 0.09% | | | | | 0.35% | 100.00% |
| Vanni | NE | 28.12% | 8.29% | 0.72% | 44.39% | | 3.60% | 0.09% | 0.34% | 3.93% | 10.17% | 0.26% | | | 0.09% | 100.00% |
| Total | | 45.62% | 37.19% | 9.10% | 3.89% | 1.18% | 0.81% | 0.57% | 0.51% | 0.47% | 0.19% | 0.11% | 0.08% | 0.07% | 0.22% | 100.00% |

== Seats ==
| Electoral District | Province | UNF | PA | JVP | TNA | SLMC | EPDP | SU | NLF | Ind | DPLF | USP | NDP | DLF | Others | Total |
|---|---|---|---|---|---|---|---|---|---|---|---|---|---|---|---|---|
| Ampara | NE | 1 | 2 | 0 | 1 | 3 | 0 | 0 | 0 | 0 | | | | | 0 | 7 |
| Anuradhapura | NC | 4 | 3 | 1 | | | | 0 | 0 | 0 | | | | | 0 | 8 |
| Badulla | UV | 5 | 3 | 0 | | | | 0 | | 0 | | | 0 | | 0 | 8 |
| Batticaloa | NE | 0 | 1 | 0 | 3 | 1 | 0 | 0 | 0 | 0 | 0 | | | | 0 | 5 |
| Colombo | WE | 12 | 7 | 2 | 0 | | 0 | 0 | 0 | 0 | | 0 | | 0 | 0 | 21 |
| Galle | SO | 5 | 4 | 1 | | | | 0 | 0 | 0 | | 0 | | 0 | 0 | 10 |
| Gampaha | WE | 9 | 7 | 2 | | | | 0 | 0 | 0 | | 0 | | | 0 | 18 |
| Hambantota | SO | 4 | 2 | 1 | | | | 0 | 0 | 0 | | | | | 0 | 7 |
| Jaffna | NE | 1 | | 0 | 6 | 0 | 2 | 0 | 0 | 0 | 0 | 0 | | 0 | 0 | 9 |
| Kalutara | WE | 5 | 4 | 1 | | | | 0 | 0 | 0 | | 0 | | | 0 | 10 |
| Kandy | CE | 7 | 4 | 1 | | | | 0 | 0 | 0 | | | | | 0 | 12 |
| Kegalle | SA | 5 | 3 | 1 | | | | 0 | 0 | 0 | | | | | 0 | 9 |
| Kurunegala | NW | 8 | 6 | 1 | | | | 0 | 0 | 0 | | | | | 0 | 15 |
| Matale | CE | 3 | 2 | 0 | | | | | 0 | 0 | | | | | 0 | 5 |
| Matara | SO | 4 | 3 | 1 | | | | 0 | 0 | 0 | | 0 | | | 0 | 8 |
| Monaragala | UV | 2 | 3 | 0 | | | | 0 | 0 | 0 | | | | | 0 | 5 |
| Nuwara Eliya | CE | 5 | 2 | 0 | | | | 0 | 0 | 0 | | 0 | 0 | 0 | 0 | 7 |
| Polonnaruwa | NC | 3 | 2 | 0 | | | | 0 | 0 | 0 | | | | 0 | 0 | 5 |
| Puttalam | NW | 4 | 3 | 0 | | | | 0 | 0 | 0 | | | | | 0 | 7 |
| Ratnapura | SA | 5 | 4 | 1 | | | | 0 | 0 | 0 | | 0 | | | 0 | 10 |
| Trincomalee | NE | 2 | 1 | 0 | 1 | | 0 | 0 | 0 | 0 | | | | | 0 | 4 |
| Vanni | NE | 2 | 0 | 0 | 3 | | 0 | 0 | 0 | 0 | 1 | 0 | | | 0 | 6 |
| National List | | 13 | 11 | 3 | 1 | 1 | 0 | 0 | 0 | 0 | 0 | 0 | 0 | 0 | 0 | 29 |
| Total | | 109 | 77 | 16 | 15 | 5 | 2 | 0 | 0 | 0 | 1 | 0 | 0 | 0 | 0 | 225 |

== See also ==
Results of the 2001 Sri Lankan general election by province
