= Results of the 2001 Sri Lankan general election by province =

Results of the 2001 Sri Lankan general election by province.

== Number of votes ==
Province	UNF	PA	JVP	TNA	SLMC	EPDP	SU	NLF	Ind	DPLF	USP	NDP	DLF	Others	Valid Votes	Rejected Votes	Total Polled	Registered Electors	Turnout %
Central	639,445	400,369	64,289				4,682	7,416	1,128		1,262	6,600	373	3,201	1,128,765	85,925	1,214,690	1,555,456	78.09%
North Central	251,841	223,072	58,961				824	4,796	448					899	540,841	31,650	572,491	730,190	78.40%
North Eastern	186,856	131,779	16,641	335,468	105,346	72,136	836	3,134	28,565	16,669	652		2,054	1,429	901,565	57,465	959,030	1,707,174	56.18%
North Western	529,641	453,756	81,747				4,387	5,064	798					2,544	1,077,937	53,039	1,130,976	1,471,845	76.84%
Sabaragamuwa	435,306	383,695	77,088				3,494	7,103	1,107		1,556			1,869	911,218	53,152	964,370	1,178,203	81.85%
Southern	523,170	509,247	175,975				4,861	7,329	1,844		1,584		465	2,568	1,227,043	58,759	1,285,802	1,602,333	80.25%
Uva	281,722	220,248	48,807				1,403	1,745	6,002			352		891	561,170	42,264	603,434	738,568	81.70%
Western	1,238,045	1,008,649	291,845	12,696		647	30,178	9,314	1,860		4,401		3,322	6,373	2,607,330	111,690	2,719,020	3,444,439	78.94%
Total	4,086,026	3,330,815	815,353	348,164	105,346	72,783	50,665	45,901	41,752	16,669	9,455	6,952	6,214	19,774	8,955,869	493,944	9,449,813	12,428,208	76.04%

== Percentage of votes ==
Province	UNF	PA	JVP	TNA	SLMC	EPDP	SU	NLF	Ind	DPLF	USP	NDP	DLF	Others	Total
Central	56.65%	35.47%	5.70%				0.41%	0.66%	0.10%		0.11%	0.58%	0.03%	0.28%	100.00%
North Central	46.56%	41.25%	10.90%				0.15%	0.89%	0.08%					0.17%	100.00%
North Eastern	20.73%	14.62%	1.85%	37.21%	11.68%	8.00%	0.09%	0.35%	3.17%	1.85%	0.07%		0.23%	0.16%	100.00%
North Western	49.13%	42.09%	7.58%				0.41%	0.47%	0.07%					0.24%	100.00%
Sabaragamuwa	47.77%	42.11%	8.46%				0.38%	0.78%	0.12%		0.17%			0.21%	100.00%
Southern	42.64%	41.50%	14.34%				0.40%	0.60%	0.15%		0.13%		0.04%	0.21%	100.00%
Uva	50.20%	39.25%	8.70%				0.25%	0.31%	1.07%			0.06%		0.16%	100.00%
Western	47.48%	38.69%	11.19%	0.49%		0.02%	1.16%	0.36%	0.07%		0.17%		0.13%	0.24%	100.00%
Total	45.62%	37.19%	9.10%	3.89%	1.18%	0.81%	0.57%	0.51%	0.47%	0.19%	0.11%	0.08%	0.07%	0.22%	100.00%

== Seats ==
Province	UNF	PA	JVP	TNA	SLMC	EPDP	SU	NLF	Ind	DPLF	USP	NDP	DLF	Others	Total
Central	15	8	1				0	0	0		0	0	0	0	24
North Central	7	5	1				0	0	0					0	13
North Eastern	6	4	0	14	4	2	0	0	0	1	0		0	0	31
North Western	12	9	1				0	0	0					0	22
Sabaragamuwa	10	7	2				0	0	0		0			0	19
Southern	13	9	3				0	0	0		0		0	0	25
Uva	7	6	0				0	0	0			0		0	13
Western	26	18	5	0		0	0	0	0		0		0	0	49
National List	13	11	3	1	1	0	0	0	0	0	0	0	0	0	29
Total	109	77	16	15	5	2	0	0	0	1	0	0	0	0	225

== See also ==
Results of the 2001 Sri Lankan general election by electoral district
