= First Gotabaya Rajapaksa cabinet =

- Cabinet of Sri Lanka

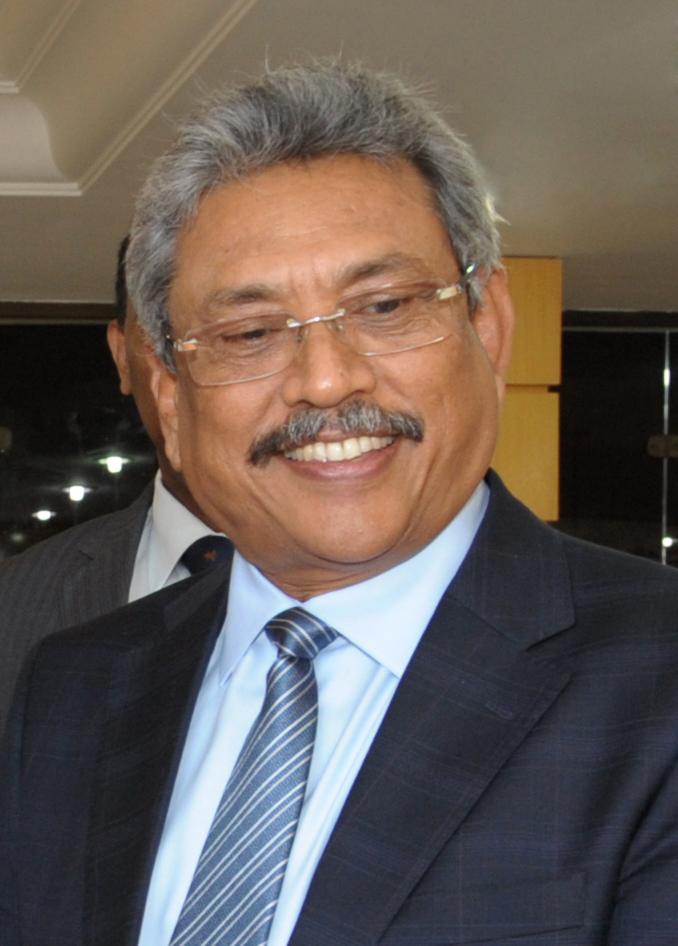
- Date formed: 21 November 2019
- Date dissolved: 12 August 2020

People and organisations
- Head of state: Gotabaya Rajapaksa
- Head of government: Gotabaya Rajapaksa
- Deputy head of government: Mahinda Rajapaksa
- Total no. of members: 56
- Member parties: Sri Lanka People's Freedom Alliance
- Status in legislature: Minority coalition
- Opposition party: United National Party
- Opposition leader: Sajith Premadasa

History
- Election: 2019
- Outgoing election: 2020
- Legislature term: 15th
- Predecessor: Sirisena IV
- Successor: Gotabaya Rajapaksa II

The first Gotabaya Rajapaksa cabinet was a central government of Sri Lanka led by President Gotabaya Rajapaksa. It was formed in November 2019 after the presidential election and ended in August 2020 following the parliamentary election.

== Cabinet members ==
Ministers appointed under article 43(1) of the Constitution of Sri Lanka.

Name	Portrait	Party	Office	Took office	Left office	^{Refs.}
Gotabaya Rajapaksa		Sri Lanka Podujana Peramuna	President	18 November 2019	(Note: Continued to hold same office in next cabinet.)	
Mahinda Rajapaksa		Sri Lanka Podujana Peramuna	Prime Minister	21 November 2019		
Mahinda Rajapaksa		Sri Lanka Podujana Peramuna	Minister of Buddha Sasana, Cultural and Religious Affairs	22 November 2019	12 August 2020	
Mahinda Rajapaksa		Sri Lanka Podujana Peramuna	Minister of Finance, Economy and Policy Development	22 November 2019	12 August 2020	
Mahinda Rajapaksa		Sri Lanka Podujana Peramuna	Minister of Urban Development, Water Supply and Housing Facilities	22 November 2019	12 August 2020	
Mahinda Rajapaksa		Sri Lanka Podujana Peramuna	Minister of Community Empowerment and Estate Infrastructure Development	1 June 2020	12 August 2020	
Dullas Alahapperuma		Sri Lanka Podujana Peramuna	Minister of Education	22 November 2019	12 August 2020	
Dullas Alahapperuma		Sri Lanka Podujana Peramuna	Minister of Sports and Youth Affairs	22 November 2019	12 August 2020	
Mahinda Amaraweera		Sri Lanka Freedom Party	Minister of Passenger Transport Management	22 November 2019	4 December 2019	
Mahinda Amaraweera		Sri Lanka Freedom Party	Minister of Power and Energy	22 November 2019	12 August 2020	
Mahinda Amaraweera		Sri Lanka Freedom Party	Minister of Transport Service Management	4 December 2019	12 August 2020	
S. M. Chandrasena		Sri Lanka Freedom Party	Minister of Environment and Wildlife Resources	22 November 2019	12 August 2020	
S. M. Chandrasena		Sri Lanka Freedom Party	Minister of Lands and Land Development	22 November 2019	12 August 2020	
Nimal Siripala de Silva		Sri Lanka Freedom Party	Minister of Justice, Human Rights and Legal Reforms	22 November 2019	12 August 2020	
Douglas Devananda		Eelam People's Democratic Party	Minister of Fisheries and Aquatic Resources	22 November 2019	12 August 2020	
Johnston Fernando		Sri Lanka Podujana Peramuna	Minister of Ports and Shipping	22 November 2019	12 August 2020	
Johnston Fernando		Sri Lanka Podujana Peramuna	Minister of Roads and Highways	22 November 2019	12 August 2020	
Bandula Gunawardena		Sri Lanka Freedom Party	Minister of Higher Education, Technology and Innovation	22 November 2019	12 August 2020	
Bandula Gunawardena		Sri Lanka Freedom Party	Minister of Information and Communication Technology	22 November 2019	17 January 2020	
Bandula Gunawardena		Sri Lanka Freedom Party	Minister of Information and Mass Media	17 January 2020	12 August 2020	
Dinesh Gunawardena		Mahajana Eksath Peramuna	Minister of Foreign Relations	22 November 2019	12 August 2020	
Dinesh Gunawardena		Mahajana Eksath Peramuna	Minister of Skills Development, Employment and Labour Relations	22 November 2019	12 August 2020	
Ramesh Pathirana		Sri Lanka Freedom Party	Minister of Plantation Industries and Export Agriculture	22 November 2019	12 August 2020	
Chamal Rajapaksa		Sri Lanka Freedom Party	Minister of Internal Trade, Food Security and Consumer Welfare	22 November 2019	12 August 2020	
Chamal Rajapaksa		Sri Lanka Freedom Party	Minister of Mahaweli, Agriculture, Irrigation and Rural Development	22 November 2019	12 August 2020	
Prasanna Ranatunga		Sri Lanka Podujana Peramuna	Minister of Industrial Export and Investment Promotion	22 November 2019	12 August 2020	
Prasanna Ranatunga		Sri Lanka Podujana Peramuna	Minister of Tourism and Civil Aviation	22 November 2019	12 August 2020	
Janaka Bandara Tennakoon		Sri Lanka Podujana Peramuna	Minister of Public Administration, Home Affairs, Provincial Councils and Local Government	22 November 2019	12 August 2020	
Arumugam Thondaman^{✝}		Ceylon Workers' Congress	Minister of Community Empowerment and Estate Infrastructure Development	22 November 2019	26 May 2020	
Pavithra Devi Wanniarachchi		Sri Lanka Freedom Party	Minister of Healthcare and Indigenous Medical Services	22 November 2019	12 August 2020	
Pavithra Devi Wanniarachchi		Sri Lanka Freedom Party	Minister of Women and Child Affairs and Social Security	22 November 2019	12 August 2020	
Wimal Weerawansa		National Freedom Front	Minister of Industries and Supply Chain Management	22 November 2019	12 August 2020	
Wimal Weerawansa		National Freedom Front	Minister of Small and Medium Business and Enterprise Development	22 November 2019	12 August 2020	

✝ _{Died while in office.}

== State ministers ==
Ministers appointed under article 44(1) of the constitution.

Name	Portrait	Party	Office	Took office	Left office	^{Refs.}
Rohitha Abeygunawardena		Sri Lanka Podujana Peramuna	State Minister of Energy	27 November 2019	12 August 2020	
Lakshman Yapa Abeywardena		Sri Lanka Podujana Peramuna	State Minister of Information and Communication Technology	27 November 2019	12 August 2020	
Mahinda Yapa Abeywardena		Sri Lanka Podujana Peramuna	State Minister of Irrigation and Rural Development	27 November 2019	12 August 2020	
Lasantha Alagiyawanna		Sri Lanka Freedom Party	State Minister of Public Management and Accounting	27 November 2019	12 August 2020	
Mahindananda Aluthgamage		Sri Lanka Podujana Peramuna	State Minister of Power	27 November 2019	6 February 2020	
Mahindananda Aluthgamage		Sri Lanka Podujana Peramuna	State Minister of Renewable Energy and Power	6 February 2020	12 August 2020	
Dilum Amunugama		Sri Lanka Podujana Peramuna	State Minister of Transport Services Management	27 November 2019	12 August 2020	
Indika Anuruddha		Sri Lanka Podujana Peramuna	State Minister of Housing	27 November 2019	12 August 2020	
Tharaka Balasuriya		Sri Lanka Podujana Peramuna	State Minister of Social Security	27 November 2019	12 August 2020	
Vijitha Berugoda		Sri Lanka Freedom Party	State Minister of Women and Child Affairs	27 November 2019	12 August 2020	
Mohan de Silva		Sri Lanka Freedom Party	State Minister of Human Rights and Law Reforms	27 November 2019	12 August 2020	
Duminda Dissanayake		Sri Lanka Freedom Party	State Minister of Youth Affairs	27 November 2019	12 August 2020	
S. B. Dissanayake		Sri Lanka Podujana Peramuna	State Minister of Lands and Land Development	27 November 2019	12 August 2020	
Wimalaweera Dissanayake		Sri Lanka Podujana Peramuna	State Minister of Wildlife Resources	27 November 2019	12 August 2020	
Arundika Fernando		Sri Lanka Podujana Peramuna	State Minister of Tourism Promotion Affairs	27 November 2019	12 August 2020	
Kanaka Herath		Sri Lanka Podujana Peramuna	State Minister of Ports Development Affairs	27 November 2019	12 August 2020	
Piyankara Jayaratne		Sri Lanka Podujana Peramuna	State Minister of Indigenous Medicine Services	27 November 2019	12 August 2020	
Dayasiri Jayasekara		Sri Lanka Freedom Party	State Minister of Industries	27 November 2019	12 August 2020	
Nimal Lanza		Sri Lanka Podujana Peramuna	State Minister of Community Development	27 November 2019	12 August 2020	
Gamini Lokuge		Sri Lanka Podujana Peramuna	State Minister of Urban Development	27 November 2019	12 August 2020	
Vasudeva Nanayakkara		Democratic Left Front	State Minister of Water Supply Facilities	27 November 2019	12 August 2020	
Sanath Nishantha		Sri Lanka Podujana Peramuna	State Minister of Fisheries and Inland Fisheries Industry	27 November 2019	12 August 2020	
Susil Premajayantha		Sri Lanka Podujana Peramuna	State Minister of International Co-operation	27 November 2019	12 August 2020	
Susantha Punchinilame		Sri Lanka Podujana Peramuna	State Minister of Small and Medium Enterprise Development	27 November 2019	12 August 2020	
Chamal Rajapaksa		Sri Lanka Freedom Party	State Minister of Defence	27 November 2019	12 August 2020	
Keheliya Rambukwella		Sri Lanka Freedom Party	State Minister of Investment Promotions	27 November 2019	12 August 2020	
Roshan Ranasinghe		Sri Lanka Freedom Party	State Minister of Mahaweli Development	27 November 2019	12 August 2020	
C. B. Ratnayake		Sri Lanka Podujana Peramuna	State Minister of Railway Services	27 November 2019	12 August 2020	
Lohan Ratwatte		Sri Lanka Podujana Peramuna	State Minister of Highways Development	27 November 2019	12 August 2020	
Mahinda Samarasinghe		Sri Lanka Freedom Party	State Minister of Public Administration and Home Affairs	27 November 2019	12 August 2020	
Jayantha Samaraweera		National Freedom Front	State Minister of Environment	27 November 2019	12 August 2020	
Shehan Semasinghe		Sri Lanka Podujana Peramuna	State Minister of Development Banking and Loan Schemes	27 November 2019	12 August 2020	
John Senewiratne		Sri Lanka Podujana Peramuna	State Minister of Economy and Policy Development	27 November 2019	12 August 2020	
Ranjith Siyambalapitiya		Sri Lanka Freedom Party	State Minister of Education Services	27 November 2019	12 August 2020	
Thilanga Sumathipala		Sri Lanka Freedom Party	State Minister of Technology and Innovations	27 November 2019	12 August 2020	
Janaka Wakkumbura		Sri Lanka Podujana Peramuna	State Minister of Export Agriculture	27 November 2019	12 August 2020	
Vidura Wickremanayake		Sri Lanka Freedom Party	State Minister of Agriculture	27 November 2019	12 August 2020	
Kanchana Wijesekera		Sri Lanka Podujana Peramuna	State Minister of Tea Industry Development	27 November 2019	12 August 2020	
Anura Priyadharshana Yapa		Sri Lanka Podujana Peramuna	State Minister of Internal Trade and Consumer Welfare	27 November 2019	12 August 2020	
