= Ministry of Coconut Development and Janatha Estate Development =

Government ministry of Sri Lanka

Agency overview
- Jurisdiction: Government of Sri Lanka
- Employees: 93
- Annual budget: Rs 1.791,700 Billion
- Deputy Minister responsible: Victor Anthony Perera
- Agency executive: Nihal Somaweera, Secretary
- Website: cdjedmin.gov.lk

The Ministry of Coconut Development and Janatha Estate Development is a ministry in the Government of Sri Lanka.

== List of ministers ==
Minister of Coconut Development and Janatha Estate Development of Sri Lanka
- Ministry of Coconut Development and Janatha Estate Development
- Website: Ministry of Coconut Development and Janatha Estate Development

The Minister of Coconut Development and Janatha Estate Development is an appointment in the Cabinet of Sri Lanka.

Parties

Sri Lanka Freedom Party United National Party

| Name | Portrait | Party | Tenure | President |
|---|---|---|---|---|
| A. P. Jagath Pushpakumara | | Sri Lanka Freedom Party | 22 November 2010 – 9 January 2015 | Mahinda Rajapaksa |

== See also ==
- List of ministries of Sri Lanka
