= Kingsley Rasanayagam =

Sri Lankan Tamil politician

Hon. Kingsley Rasanayagam

Member of Parliament for Batticaloa District
- In office 2 April 2004 – 18 May 2004
- Succeeded by: Pakkiyaselvam Ariyanethiran

Personal details
- Born: 1941 Kallaru, Batticaloa
- Died: 19 October 2004 (aged 62–63) Iruthayapuram, Batticaloa
- Party: Tamil National Alliance
- Profession: People's Bank employee

Kingsley Rasanayagam (1941–2004) was a Sri Lankan Tamil politician and former Member of Parliament. In 2004 Rasanayagam was selected by the Liberation Tigers of Tamil Eelam (LTTE) as a Tamil National Alliance (TNA) parliamentary candidate. He represented the Batticaloa multi-member electoral district for the TNA in the Sri Lankan Parliament, for a short period of time between April 2004 and May 2004. In May 2004, he was pressured to resign, by the LTTE because of his close relationship with former LTTE Eastern Province leader Vinayagamoorthy Muralitharan alias Karuna Amman. LTTE chief Velupillai Prabhakaran feared that he would become a patron to the political party registered by Karuna Amman, Tamil Makkal Viduthalai Pulikal (TMVP).

== Early life ==
Kingsley Rasanayagam was born in Kallaru, Batticaloa. He was a Tamil Christian (Methodist). His father was a schoolmaster when he moved to the Batticaloa town at Kingsly's younger age.

== Politics ==
Rasanayagam was involved in Illankai Tamil Arasu Kachchi aka Federal Party since his early days. He started playing a prominent role as a member of the Batticaloa citizens committee after 1983. He was a close associate of senior LTTE leader Kasi Anandan by the Indian Peace Keeping Force period during 1987–90. He resigned from Peoples' Bank and began working with the Tamils Rehabilitation Organisation. After that, he became a trusted confidant of Karuna Amman. With the help of Amman, Rasanayagam contested in 2004 Parliamentary elections and won. Because TNA salewarts like Joseph Pararajasingham and Pakkiyaselvam Ariyanethiran, failed to get selected in the election, LTTE pressurized Rasanayagam to resign though he stated it was for personal reasons. He resigned from his parliamentary seat in May 2004.

== Death ==
Around 6:20 p.m., 19 October 2004, he was shot dead by unidentified gunmen near Kalliyankaadu cemetery in Iruthayapuram within Batticaloa municipal limits. DBS Jeyaraj blames the LTTE for his killing.

== See also ==
- Vinayagamoorthy Muralitharan
