= Kumara Welgama =

Sri Lankan politician (1950–2024)

Hon. Kumara Welgama
- කුමාර වෙල්ගම குமார வெல்கம

Leader of the New Lanka Freedom Party
- In office 6 March 2020 – 28 September 2024

Minister of Transport
- In office 23 April 2010 – 9 January 2015
- President: Mahinda Rajapaksa
- Prime Minister: D. M. Jayaratne
- Preceded by: Dullas Alahapperuma
- Succeeded by: Ranjith Madduma Bandara

Minister of Industrial Development
- In office 28 January 2007 – 23 April 2010
- President: Mahinda Rajapaksa
- Prime Minister: Ratnasiri Wickremanayake

Deputy Minister of Power & Energy
- In office 10 April 2004 – 19 November 2005
- President: Chandrika Kumaratunga
- Prime Minister: Mahinda Rajapaksa

Deputy Minister of Transport
- In office 3 November 2000 – 2001
- President: Chandrika Kumaratunga
- Prime Minister: Ratnasiri Wickremanayake

Member of Parliament for Kalutara District
- In office 25 August 1994 – 24 September 2024

Personal details
- Born: 5 April 1950 Dominion of Ceylon
- Died: 28 September 2024 (aged 74) Colombo, Sri Lanka
- Party: New Lanka Freedom Party (2019–2024); Sri Lanka Freedom Party (before 2019)
- Other political affiliations: Samagi Jana Balawegaya
- Education: St Thomas' College

Kumara Welgama (Sinhala: කුමාර වෙල්ගම; 5 April 1950 – 28 September 2024) was a Sri Lankan politician who served as a Member of Parliament for the Kalutara District between 1994 and 2024. Welgama had been a minister of the Sri Lanka Freedom Party (SLFP) until 2020, and from 2020 to his death in 2024 he was the leader of the New Lanka Freedom Party and contested elections under the banner of the Samagi Jana Balawegaya.

Welgama was the chief organiser for the Sri Lanka Freedom Party in the Agalawatte electorate between 1984 and 2000. Welgama was the Minister of Industrial Development from 2007 to 2010 and the Minister of Transportation from 2010 to early 2015 in governments led by the Sri Lanka Freedom Party.

Welgama had been a member of the Sri Lanka Freedom Party until 2019, when he defected from the party after its endorsement of the presidential campaign of Gotabaya Rajapaksa. Welgama instead supported United National Party (UNP) candidate Sajith Premadasa and split from the SLFP to form a new party, the New Lanka Freedom Party, which joined the Samagi Jana Balawegaya alliance led by Sajith Premadasa during the 2020 parliamentary elections.

Welgama died while receiving treatment at a private hospital in Colombo, on 28 September 2024. He was 74.
