= Janaka Ratnayake =

Sri Lankan entrepreneur (born 1964)

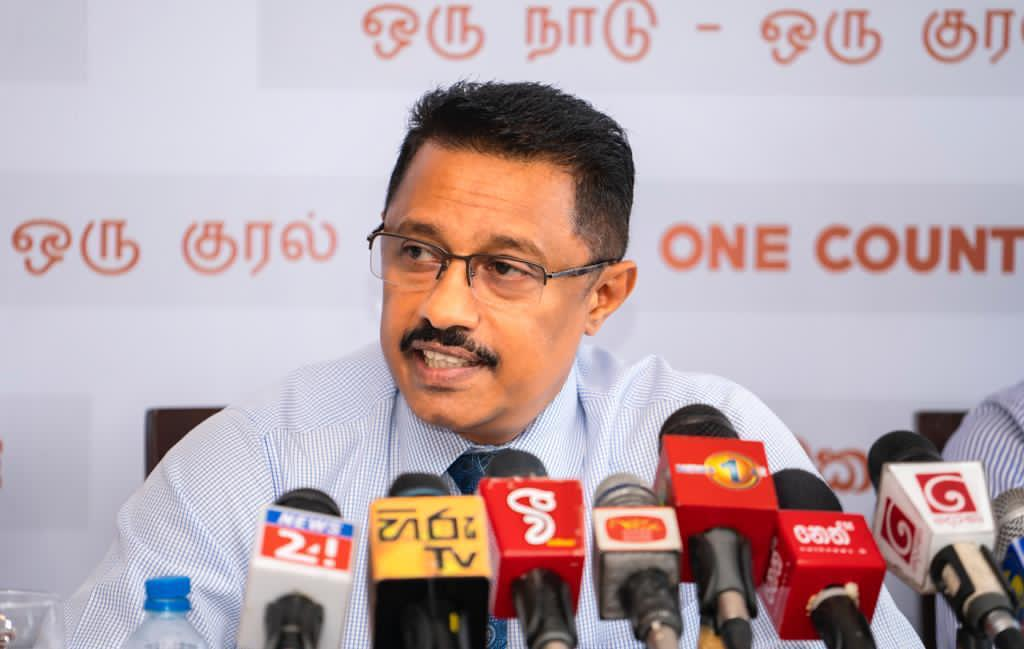
- Ratnayake in 2019
- Born: 7 December 1964 (age 61); Kandy, Dominion of Ceylon
- Occupations: Chairman and CEO Trillium Property Management & Services Limited (since 2014); Chairman of the Public Utilities Commission of Sri Lanka (2021–2023); Chairman, Export Development Board (2010–2013); Chairman, Merchant Bank of Sri Lanka PLC (2007–2009)

Janaka Ratnayake is a Sri Lankan businessman, and the chairman of Trillium Property Management and Services Ltd, City Housing and Real Estate PLC, Trillium Residencies Pvt Ltd, and Rent A Comp Pvt Ltd.

He was chairman of the Public Utilities Commission of Sri Lanka from 2021 until he was ousted in 2023. He is the former chairman and chief executive of Export Development Board of Sri Lanka (EDB), Merchant Bank of Sri Lanka (MBSL), Merchant Credit Sri Lanka (MCSL), MBSL Savings Bank, and MBSL Insurance.

On 24 May 2023, Ratnayake declared his candidacy for the 2024 Sri Lankan presidential election.

== Education and early career ==
Educated at Dharmaraja College, Kandy, Ratnayake graduated from the management faculty of University of Sri Jayewardenepura in 1990. During his time as an undergraduate, he was able to obtain a scholarship to Moscow gaining a Diploma in Russian Language and International Relations from Russia. Janaka's graduation with his undergraduate degree was delayed during the JVP insurgency in the late 80s when he was briefly imprisoned for taking part in student activism activities. He graduated with a BSc Special degree in Public Administration from the University of Sri Jayewardenepura, gained a Master of Business Studies (MBS) from the University of Colombo and during his tenure at Merchant Bank of Sri Lanka (MBSL), Ratnayake was able to attend a University of Harvard Executive Education program "Making Corporate Boards Effective".

He began his career as an audit trainee for Richard Pieris and moved on to working within sales and the information technology sector by joining Computer Link Pvt Ltd. and then later Precision Tech in 1990 after graduating.

== Business ventures ==
=== Information technology ===
In 1993, Ratnayake ventured into the information technology industry as an entrepreneur, with his pilot project, Computer Island Group Pvt Ltd (CIL) which won him the award for Entrepreneur of the Year in the year 2000.

=== Real estate ===
Janaka Ratnayake entered into the real estate industry with Trillium Property Management and Services Limited which was valued by PriceWaterHouseCoopers at Rs. 1.7 Billion in 2016. The company began its operations by entering the luxury residential market with key properties in the most affluent areas of Colombo, and immediately diversified into the Commercial Property sector with very strategic acquisitions of historically significant buildings such as the Dasa Building in Borella. Trillium made its move into the luxury hospitality sector with the Trillium Hotel Colombo. Valued at $4.5 million, the Trillium Hotel Colombo is based in one of the most affluent parts of Colombo and is categorised as boutique city hotel.

== State sector ==
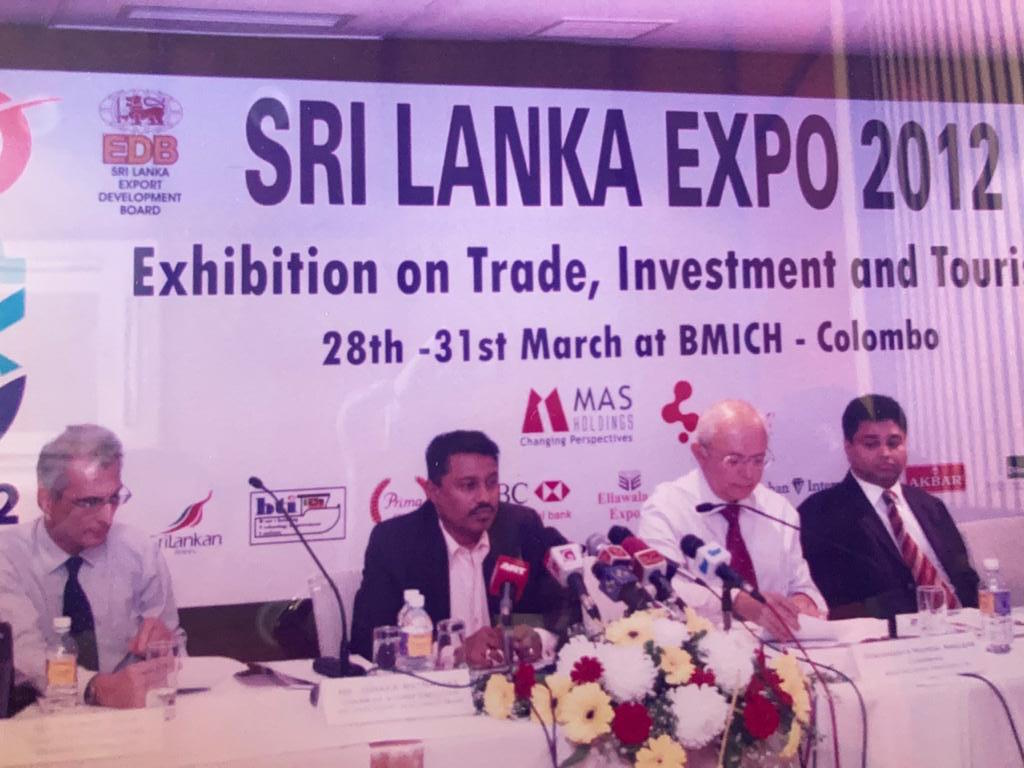
At a press conference at Expo2012 sitting beside Group Chief Executive Officer Ashroff Omar and Chairman of MAS Group Mahesh Amalean

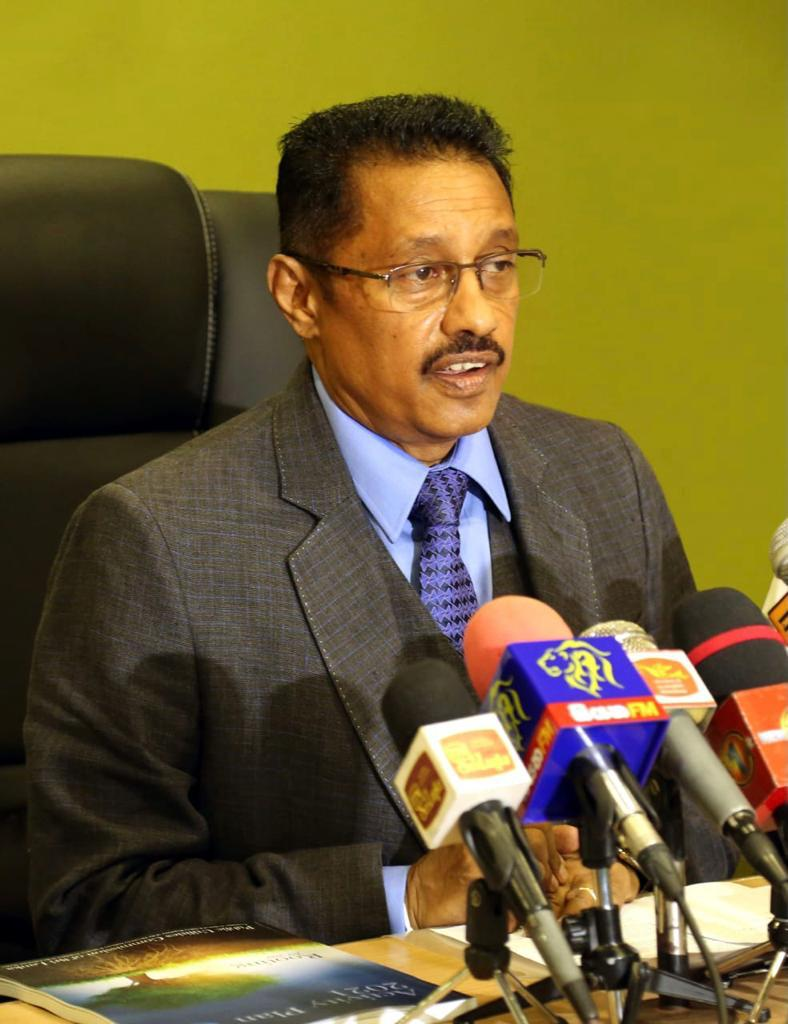
Speech given at the swearing-in ceremony at the Public Utilities Commission of Sri Lanka

=== Chairman of Merchant Bank of Sri Lanka PLC (2009–2011) ===
In 2008, he was appointed the chairman of Merchant Bank of Sri Lanka (MBSL) a financial services provider in Sri Lanka specialising in trade finance and investment banking. He was instrumental in leading an expansion strategy aimed at improving the banks strength within diverse sectors of the banking and finance industry. However, this was done within a time of economic recession (2008/2009) where Sri Lanka saw the collapse of one of the largest conglomerates, the Ceylinco Group collapse causing much damage to the financial stability. Most of the financial institutions under the Ceylinco Group faced a high risk of collapsing due to the withdrawal of money by depositors and investors.

==== Managing the financial crisis ====
During his tenure as the Chairman of Merchant Bank of Sri Lanka, he restructured and rehabilitated many of the financially distressed companies under the Ceylinco Group. MBSL took the responsibility of restructuring and reviving many financial institutions such as The Finance Company PLC (the oldest finance company in Sri Lanka), City Housing and Real Estate PLC (the oldest real estate company in Sri Lanka), Asian Finance PLC, Standard Credit, Ceylinco Savings Bank, Finance & Guarantee, Ceylinco Building Society, Fingara Country Club, Ceylinco Sussex Network of Colleges (the largest private school network in Sri Lanka) and ABC Insurance Ltd. In order to further strengthen the financial stability of the banking sector, MBSL acquired the Ceylinco Savings Bank (now MBSL Savings Bank) and ABC Insurance Company (now MBSL Insurance) with an infusion of capital.

=== Chairman of Export Development Board of Sri Lanka (2011–2013) ===
In the year 2010, Janaka was appointed as the chairman and chief executive officer of the apex body for promoting the Export Sector - the Export Development Board of Sri Lanka (EDB). During his term at EDB he successfully restored many international trade related ties between countries such as Japan, India, Pakistan, and the UK. One of the EDB's notable achievements during his tenure at the EDB, was hosting Sri Lanka's largest Export, Investment, and Tourism symposium, EXPO 2012 that gave Sri Lankan exporters a platform to showcase their products to both potential foreign and local clients. Rallying many exporters together, he successfully managed to attract over 1000 delegates including several trade and commerce ministers from Israel, India, Pakistan and the Maldives to name a few With Sri Lanka still looking for a second branded export after Ceylon Tea, the EDB ensured that Sri Lanka secured a head-start with Ceylon Cinnamon which was registered and patented in all economically strategic locations worldwide as "Pure Ceylon Cinnamon" Along with the EDB, Janaka Ratnayake was tasked with serving on the board the Sri Lanka Gem and Jewellery Authority.

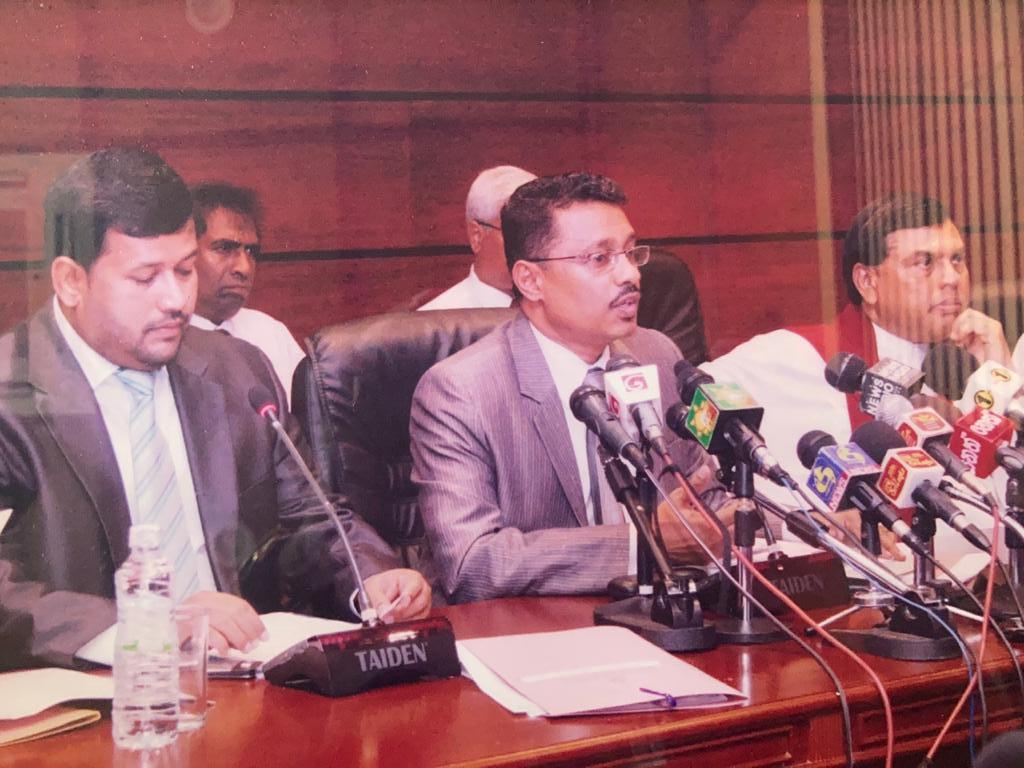
Speaking at opening day press conference of the Expo2012 in Sri Lanka. Seated besides Former Minister Rishard Bathiudeen and the Former Minister for Economic Development.

=== Commonwealth Games 2018 bid ===
He was also appointed as a director on the committee responsible for organising the bid for Sri Lanka to host the Commonwealth Games in 2018.

=== Chairman of Public Utilities Commission of Sri Lanka (2021–2023) ===
In the year 2021, Janaka was appointed as the Chairman of the Public Utilities Commission of Sri Lanka. Amidst rumors of an apparent abolishment of the commission, he was tasked with reinstating the importance of this entity as a power and water regulator. Within the first few months of his appointment, the PUCSL approved Sri Lanka's largest power plant in over a decade, which will contribute 300MW to the national grid. Subsequently, the PUCSL launched the first phase of its program to provide National Vocational Qualification (NVQ 3 Level) free to trained electricians islandwide in March 2021 with the aim of qualifying 45,000 electricians within the next two years.

In 2022, he gained national attention with the Public Utilities Commission making commitments on maintaining the national power supply amidst the Sri Lankan economic crisis.

In 2023, he was removed by parliament.
