= Siritunga Jayasuriya =

Sri Lankan politician

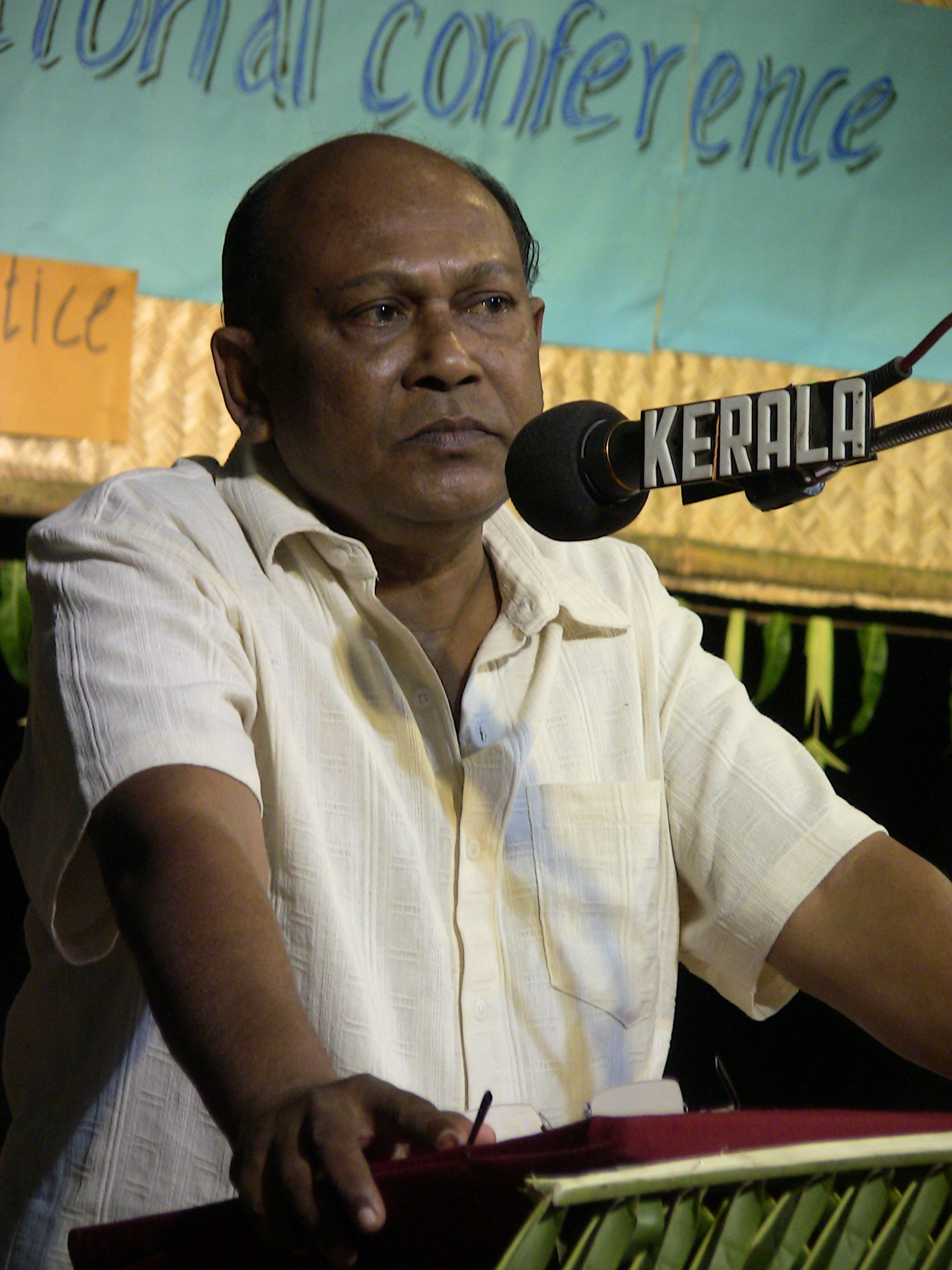
Siritunga Jayasuriya in 2010

Siritunga Jayasuriya is a Sri Lankan politician, trade unionist and current leader of the United Socialist Party. He was formerly a member of the Lanka Sama Samaja Party and later the Nava Sama Samaja Party.

Jayasuriya is a perennial candidate in Sri Lankan presidential elections, running for president in every election from 2005 to 2024. In 2005, he won 35,405 votes, 0.36% of the votes cast and came third. This would be his best performance at a presidential election and has never been able to win more than 10,000 votes in an election since.

In early 2007, Siritunga narrowly escaped a raid by 300 armed thugs at a place where an anti-war rally against the Sri Lankan Civil War was due to take place.
