= P. Ariyanethiran =

Sri Lankan politician

Hon. P. Ariyanethiran
- பா. அரியநேத்திரன்

Member of Parliament for Batticaloa District
- In office 2004–2015
- Preceded by: Kingsley Rasanayagam

Personal details
- Born: 1 February 1955 (age 71)
- Party: Illankai Tamil Arasu Kachchi
- Other political affiliations: Tamil National Alliance

Pakkiyaselvam Ariyanethiran (Tamil: பாக்கியசெல்வம் அரியநேத்திரன்; born 1 February 1955) is a Sri Lankan Tamil politician. He was a Member of Parliament from the Batticaloa District from 2004 to 2015, representing the Tamil National Alliance.

== Political career ==
Ariyanethiran was trustee of Kokkatticholai Sivan Temple and editor of Thamil Alai (Tamil Wave), a Liberation Tigers of Tamil Eelam newspaper. He was selected by the LTTE as one of the Tamil National Alliance's (TNA) candidates in the Batticaloa District at the 2004 parliamentary election but failed to get elected after placing fifth amongst the TNA candidates. However, Ariyanethiran entered Parliament in May 2004 following the resignation of Kingsley Rasanayagam. It has been alleged that the LTTE abducted and forced Rasanayagam to resign to make way for Ariyanethiran.

Ariyanethiran was re-elected at the 2010 parliamentary election. He failed to get re-elected at the 2015 parliamentary election.

In 2024, Ariyanethiran was nominated by a number of Tamil political parties as their common candidate of the 2024 presidential elections. The Ilankai Tamil Arasu Kachchi notably did not endorse Ariyanethiran. Although Ariyanethiran only won 1.7% of the national vote, his performance was considerably stronger in the Tamil-majority districts of the North and East. In the Jaffna district, Ariyanethiran became the 2nd most-voted candidate, beating the likes of president Ranil Wickremesinghe and NPP candidate Anura Kumara Dissanayake. In Vanni, he was the 3rd most-voted.

== Electoral history ==
Electoral history of P. Ariyanethiran
Election	Constituency	Party	Votes	Result
2004 parliamentary	Batticaloa District	TNA	35,377	Not elected
2010 parliamentary	Batticaloa District	TNA	16,504	Elected
2015 parliamentary	Batticaloa District	TNA		Not elected
2024 presidential	Sri Lanka	Ind	226,343	Lost
