= New Lanka Freedom Party =

Political party in Sri Lanka

New Lanka Freedom Party නව ලංකා නිදහස් පක්ෂය Nava Lanka Nidahas Pakshaya
- Chairman: Vacant
- General Secretary: Peshala Jayarathne
- Founder: Kumara Welgama
- Founded: 2020
- Split from: Sri Lanka Freedom Party
- Headquarters: Battaramulla, Colombo
- Ideology: Social democracy Sinhalese nationalism Left-wing nationalism
- Political position: Centre-left
- National affiliation: Samagi Jana Balawegaya (2020–2024); New Democratic Front (since 2024)
- Parliament: 0 / 225
- Local Government: 5 / 8,741

Election symbol
- Hare

The New Lanka Freedom Party (Sinhala: නව ලංකා නිදහස් පක්ෂය, Nava Lanka Nidahas Pakshaya) is a political party in Sri Lanka which was founded by former Sri Lanka Freedom Party (SLFP) politician Kumara Welgama in 2020. The party is known for its close ties with former president of Sri Lanka and former leader of the SLFP Chandrika Kumaratunga, who, like Welgama, has been a vocal critic of former president Gotabaya Rajapaksa.

== History ==
Welgama had been a member of the Sri Lanka Freedom Party until 2019, when he defected from the party due to its support for the presidential candidacy of Sri Lanka Podujana Peramuna (SLPP) candidate Gotabaya Rajapaksa in the upcoming presidential elections, paving the way for the return of the Rajapaksa family to Sri Lankan politics. Welgama instead supported United National Party (UNP) candidate Sajith Premadasa. In 2020, Welgama founded his own political party named the New Lanka Freedom Party, which joined the Samagi Jana Balawegaya (SJB) alliance led by Premadasa to contest in the 2020 parliamentary elections.

On 5 September, 2022, former president Chandrika Kumaratunga declared the headquarters of the New Lanka Freedom Party open, located in Battaramulla, Colombo.
