= A. S. P. Liyanage =

Sri Lankan businessman

A.S.P. Liyanage
- Born: Colombo Sri Lanka
- Other name: P.D.P.S. Anura Liyanage
- Education: Nalanda College Colombo
- Occupations: Businessman, diplomat
- Known for: Sri Lankan ambassador for Qatar; Founder and CEO, ASP Group; Television program A.S.P Paduru Partiya
- Political party: Sri Lanka Labour Party
- Children: Kasuni Liyanage and Githmi Liyanage

Notes
- former Sri Lankan High Commissioner to Nigeria

Panagoda Don Prince Solomon Anura Liyanage (a.k.a. A.S.P. Liyanage) is a Sri Lankan businessman, television and film producer and politician. On 10 March 2017, he was appointed as the Sri Lankan ambassador for Qatar.

Liyanage received his education at Nalanda College Colombo and began teaching, publishing a number of textbooks. In 1989, he established the ASP Group, a private real estate company, and served as its chairman and managing director. Liyanage was a Millennium Development Ambassador to the People's Summit during the 34th G8 summit in Hokkaido, Japan in 2008, and to the United Nations European headquarters in Geneva in 2007. Liyanage ran advertisements congratulating US President Barack Obama before his victory in the 2008 United States presidential election.

Liyanage conducted the popular Sri Lankan celebrity TV program A.S.P Paduru Partiya for 7 years. He also produced television and film adaptations of Suseema.

Liyanage ran as a candidate for President of Sri Lanka in 2010, 2015 and 2019, and 2024. In the 2010 election, he achieved a distant third place in preferential voting in the commercial capital of Colombo. However, like a number of minor candidates, Liyanage was entered as a "dummy candidate" to maximize benefits for a frontrunner, namely incumbent president Mahinda Rajapaksa, under the election laws. Between the elections, Liyanage was appointed Sri Lankan High Commissioner to Nigeria.

Liyanage has two daughters.

== See also ==
- List of Sri Lankan non-career diplomats

== Sources ==
- A.S.P. Liyanage appointed as Sri Lankan Ambassador to Qatar
- A. S. P. Liyanage appointed as Sri Lankan Ambassador to Qatar
- PIM's MBA program in Doha patronised by Sri Lanka's new Ambassador and Central Province Governor
- Chartered Accountants of Sri Lanka hold annual event
