= Akmeemana Dayarathana Thera =

Sri Lankan politician

Hon. Akmeemana Dayarathana

Member of Parliament for Colombo District
- In office 2004–2010
- Preceded by: Kahaluwe Ratnaseeha
- Majority: Colombo District

Personal details
- Born: 24 December 1970 (age 55) Akmeemana Galle
- Party: Jathika Hela Urumaya and Sinhala Rawaya
- Other political affiliations: Sri Lanka Podujana Peramuna
- Relations: Mr. Sisira Udawatta, Mr. Nandalal Udawatta, Mrs. Mallika Udawatta
- Education: University of Peradeniya (Bachelor of Arts )

Akmeemana Dayarathana Thera is a Sri Lankan politician and a former Member of the Parliament of Sri Lanka. Thero was born in Akmeemana, Galle. His mother's name is Siriyawathi and his father was Sumatipala. Thera was in Parliament from 2004 to 2010.
