= Pemasiri Manage =

Sri Lankan politician

Hon. Pemasiri Manage MP

Member of Parliament for Matara District
- In office 2004–2010

Personal details
- Party: Janatha Vimukthi Peramuna

M. M. Pemasiri Manage is a Sri Lankan politician, teacher and former member of the Parliament of Sri Lanka. He graduated from the University of Ruhuna. He has 3 sons: Sapumal, Prabhashana, and Giwesh.
