= Sidney Jayarathna =

Sri Lankan politician

Hon. Sidney Jayarathna MP

Member of Parliament for Polonnaruwa District
- In office 2001–2004
- In office 2015–2020

Personal details
- Born: 1 June 1962 (age 63)
- Party: United National Party

Sidney Jayarathna (born 1 June 1962) is a Sri Lankan politician and a member of the Parliament of Sri Lanka. He was elected from Polonnaruwa District in 2015. He is a member of the United National Party.
