= M. Thilakarajah =

Sri Lankan politician

Hon. M. Thilakarajah MP

Member of Parliament for Nuwara Eliya District
- Incumbent
- Assumed office 17 August 2015

Personal details
- Born: 29 September 1973 (age 53)
- Party: National Union of Workers
- Education: University of Colombo
- Occupation: Trade unionist

Mylvaganam Thilakarajah (born 29 September 1973) is a Sri Lankan trade unionist, politician and Member of Parliament.

== Early life ==
Thilakarajah was born on 29 September 1973. He was educated at Highlands College, Hatton and St. Theresa's Girls College, Kilinochchi. After school he joined the University of Colombo, graduating with a B.Com. degree. He also holds a diploma in journalism from the university and is currently studying for a LL.B. from the Open University of Sri Lanka.

== Career ==
Thilakarajah is general-secretary of the Workers' Nation Front and deputy general-secretary of the National Union of Workers.

Thilakarajah was one of the United National Front for Good Governance's (UNFGG) candidates in Nuwara Eliya District at the 2015 parliamentary election. He was elected and entered Parliament.

== Electoral history ==
Electoral history of M. Thilakarajah
Election	Constituency	Party	Alliance	Votes	Result
2015 parliamentary	Nuwara Eliya District	National Union of Workers	United National Front for Good Governance	67,761	Elected
