= Victor Anthony Perera =

Sri Lankan politician

Victor Anthony Perera is a Sri Lankan politician and former member of the Parliament of Sri Lanka. He belongs to the Sri Lanka Freedom Party.
