= United Socialist Party (Sri Lanka) =

United Socialist Party එක්සත් සමාජවාදි පකෂය ஐக்கிய சோசலிச கட்சி
- General Secretary: Siritunga Jayasuriya
- Founded: 1989
- Split from: Nava Sama Samaja Party
- Headquarters: 53/6, E. D. Dabare Mawatha, Narahenpita, Colombo 05
- Newspaper: Rathutharuwa / Sentharakai (Red Star)
- Ideology: Socialism; Trotskyism
- Political position: Far-left
- International affiliation: Committee for a Workers' International (2019)
- Colours: Red

Election symbol
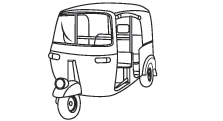
- Trishaw

Website
- www.lankasocialist.net

The United Socialist Party (Sinhala: එක්සත් සමාජවාදි පකෂය, Eksath Samajavadi Pakshaya, Tamil: ஐக்கிய சோசலிச கட்சி, Aikkiy soōcialica Kaṭci) is a Trotskyist political party in Sri Lanka. The party is led by perennial presidential candidate Siritunga Jayasuriya. It is affiliated with the Committee for a Workers' International.

== History ==
The USP traces its origins back to the main leftist opposition faction within the Lanka Sama Samaja Party, the Vama Samasamaja. This group was introduced to what was to become the Committee for a Workers' International (CWI) in the 1970s. The Vama Samasamaja became the Nava Sama Samaja Party when it split from the LSSP in December 1977 following a number of expulsions from the LSSP starting in 1972.

The NSSP was a section of the CWI from its foundation until it left in 1989. Disagreements on areas of theory and policy (such as the analysis of Stalinism) with the CWI eventually led to a second split. One disagreement was over the leaders' support of the controversial Indo-Sri Lanka Accord, signed in 1987, which led to the deployment of the Indian Peace Keeping Force, in a document issued on 12 February 1988. After 1989, the NSSP became a member of the United Secretariat of the Fourth International, while those still supporting the CWI split from the NSSP to form the United Socialist Party.

=== Opposition to the Sri Lankan Civil War ===
The USP criticised the Indian government for providing military support to the Sri Lankan government, whose armed forces were conducting a campaign against Tamil separatist rebels in the north of the country. The party opposed the Rajapaksa government's militarist solution to the country's civil war, holding the position that military victory in the Tamil-dominated areas would not solve the national question, with ill feelings and further violence likely to erupt as a result. USP General Secretary, Siritunga Jayasuriya, is also quoted with saying that the government's military operation was a "war not against LTTE cadre, but against the Tamil people."

== Electoral history ==
=== Presidential ===
Year	Candidate	Votes	%	Result
2005	Siritunga Jayasuriya	35,425	0.36%	Lost
2010	Siritunga Jayasuriya	8,352	0.08%	Lost
2015	Siritunga Jayasuriya	8,840	0.07%	Lost
2019	Siritunga Jayasuriya	3,944	0.03%	Lost
2024	Siritunga Jayasuriya	8,954	0.07%	Lost

In the 2005 presidential elections, USP candidate Siritunga Jayasuriya came third place, winning 35,425 votes (0.36%).

=== Other ===
In the 2006 council elections, the USP won 710 votes (2.37%) in Eheliyagoda Pradeseheeya Sabha (Ratnapura District), winning a seat in the council.
